= Prince associates =

Musical associates of the artist Prince

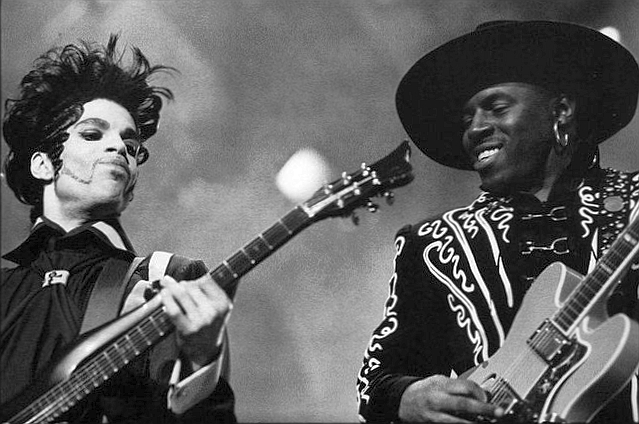
Prince performing with Levi Seacer Jr

Prince had many musical associates (band members, collaborators, and proteges) during his career.

Artist	Occupation	Affiliation	Years affiliated	Other notes
Andy Allo	singer/songwriter	New Power Generation guitarist	2011-2012	Prince collaborated on 3 Superconductor songs.
Apollonia Kotero	vocalist	Protégé	1984	Prince wrote and produced Apollonia 6.
Michael Bland	drummer	New Power Generation drummer	1989-1996	Contributed to 3121 and Planet Earth.
Tommy Barbarella	keyboardist	New Power Generation keyboardist	1990-1996	
Brownmark	bassist	The Revolution bassist	1981-1986	Prince produced songs on his solo albums
André Cymone	bassist	High school bandmate and Prince bassist	1979-1980	Prince wrote and produced "The Dance Electric" for his 1985 album AC
Tevin Campbell	vocalist	Performed "Round and Round" on Graffiti Bridge soundtrack and provided vocals on other tracks	1988	Prince wrote and produced several songs for Campbell's 1993 solo album, I'm Ready
Ingrid Chavez	vocalist	Provided vocals on several of Prince's albums and acted in Graffiti Bridge	199x	Prince produced a 1991 album for her, which included five songs he co-wrote.
Margie Cox	vocalist	A long-time associate, contributing to various projects for Prince and associated artists		
Morris Day	singer	In a high school band with Prince and Andre Cymone	1980s	Later led The Time, which had many Prince-written songs
Dez Dickerson	guitarist	Guitarist for The Revolution	1979–1983	Dickerson was the Vice President of A&R with the CCM label Starsong Communications
Sheena Easton	singer	Prince contributed several songs for her on albums over the years, including the Top 10 hit "Sugar Walls", and "101"	1987-1990	She duetted with Prince on the songs "U Got the Look" and "The Arms of Orion"
Candy Dulfer	saxophonist	Prince wrote the song "Sunday Afternoon" on her album Sax-a-Go-Go		She had been an on/off member in his backing bands from 1989 until his death in 2016
Carmen Electra	singer/dancer	Protégé	1991-1993	Back-up dancer on tours and music videos during the early 1990s, it was then that Prince created her stage name.
Sheila E.	drummer	Band drummer	1987–1989	Sheila had 3 albums produced by Prince in the 1980s.
T.C. Ellis	rapper	Rapped on Graffiti Bridge album and the "New Power Generation" single.	198x	Prince produced several songs for his 1991 solo album, True Confessions
Demetrius Ross	songwriter	Writer and vocalist as Demetrius "Sir Jam" Ross on Graffiti Bridge soundtrack.	1990	Credited as co-writer on the rap version of Bambi on True Confessions
Doctor Fink	Keyboardist	The Revolution keyboardist	1979-90	Credited as co-writer on several Prince tracks
Rosie Gaines	vocalist and organist	New Power Generation member	1990-1992	Prince produced a song for her 1995 solo album
Elisa Fiorillo	singer	Backup vocals for Batman and Graffiti Bridge.	1990	Prince and Levi Seacer, Jr. produced her album I Am in 1990, which spawned the two singles "On the Way Up" and "Oooh This I Need"
Mayte Garcia	vocalist	Ex-wife and former band member, providing backing vocals and stage dancing.	1990-1996	Prince produced 1995's Child of the Sun.
Clare Fischer	musician	Provided string arrangements for Prince's albums since 1985.	1985-2010	
Cat Glover	vocalist	Backing vocalist and tour choreographer	1987–1989	
Jimmy Jam	keyboardist	Former keyboardist for The Time	1981–1983; 1990	Formed a hit producing team with Terry Lewis
Larry Graham	bassist	Occasional New Power Generation bassist and Prince's spiritual guide	19xx?	Bass player for Sly and the Family Stone
Jesse Johnson	guitarist	Former guitarist of The Time	1981–1984; 1990	Covered a 94 East song on his Shockadelica album. Prince later wrote a song based on the album's title.
Morris Hayes	keyboardist	New Power Generation keyboardist	1992–1999	
Chaka Khan	singer	She provided vocals for his Newpower Soul album in 1998 and toured briefly on the Newpower Soul Tour/Festival for the album's promotion	1998	Khan's biggest hit, "I Feel for You", is a cover of a Prince song. Prince produced her 1998 album, Come 2 My House, and wrote several songs for it. Her single "Don't Talk 2 Strangers" was a cover of an unreleased Prince song.
Jill Jones	Vocalist	Unofficial vocalist for The Revolution on 1999 album and related videos.	198x?	Had a self-titled album produced by Prince in 1987.
Patti LaBelle	singer	Has had several songs written and produced by Prince, including her 1989 hit, "Yo Mister", as well as "Love 89" and "I Hear Your Voice"	1989	
Eric Leeds	saxophonist	Saxophonist for Madhouse and The Revolution (and beyond) from 1986 to 1989	1986-1989	Has provided brass and flute for many years since. Had a 1991 album produced by Prince
Terry Lewis	bassist	Former bassist for The Time		
Albert Magnoli	film director	Director of Purple Rain and the "Batdance" video.	1984-1990	
Maceo Parker	saxophonist	New Power Generation saxophonist		1999-2016
Bobby "Z" Rivkin	drummer	Drummer for The Revolution	1979–1986	Contributed a song for The Family
Martika	singer			Prince produced her second album, Martika's Kitchen, and wrote four songs for it, including the singles "Martika's Kitchen" and "Love... Thy Will Be Done", a Billboard Top Ten hit in 1992.
Levi Seacer, Jr.	bassist, guitarist	Collaborated on many projects with Prince	1987–1990, 1991–1993	
Sonny Thompson	bassist	New Power Generation bassist	1990–1996	Provided bass for the title track of 3121 and Planet Earth.
Mavis Staples	singer	Performed "Melody Cool" and provided vocals for several Graffiti Bridge tracks.	1989-92	Had two albums produced by Prince (1989 and 1992).
Wendy Melvoin	guitarist	The Revolution guitarist	1983-1986	Formed Wendy and Lisa with Lisa Coleman
Lisa Coleman	keyboardist	The Revolution keyboardist	1980-1986	Formed Wendy and Lisa with Wendy Melvoin
Jevetta Steele	vocalist	Contributed vocals to many of Prince's tracks, both solo and as a member of The Steeles.	198x	Had several songs produced by Prince.
Támar	vocalist	Protégé, providing backing vocals on 3121	20XX	Prince produced her unreleased album, Milk & Honey
Bria Valente	singer	Protégé and former girlfriend of Prince	2009	Prince produced her solo album Elixer as part of the Lotusflow3r 3-CD set released in 2009.
Vanity	singer/actress	Former girlfriend and lead singer of Vanity 6	1982-3	Prince's girl-group side project from 1982 to 1983

Prince played keyboards in the studio for Stevie Nicks' 1983 song, "Stand Back".

== Associated bands & side projects ==
- 94 East
- The Time
- Vanity 6
- Apollonia 6
- The Revolution
- Wendy & Lisa
- The Family
- Madhouse
- The New Power Generation
- 3rdeyegirl
