= The Earth Tour: 21 Nights in London =

2007 concert residency at the O2 arena by Prince

- Residency by Prince
- Promotional banner for Prince's concert series
- Location: London, England
- Venue: The O2 Arena
- Associated album: Planet Earth
- Start date: August 1, 2007
- End date: September 21, 2007
- Legs: 1
- No. of shows: 21

Prince concert chronology
- Per4ming Live 3121 (2006–07); The Earth Tour: 21 Nights in London (2007); Prince 20Ten (2010)

The Earth Tour: 21 Nights in London was a concert residency at the O2 arena in London by American recording artist Prince that commenced on 1 August 2007 and concluded on 21 September 2007. Tickets for all 21 nights were sold-out.

The residency was announced at a press conference on 8 May 2007. It was nominally in support of his recently released Planet Earth album which had been distributed in the UK for free with copies of The Mail on Sunday newspaper on 15 July 2007, although the performances themselves primarily concentrated on earlier hits. Tickets for the concerts were priced at £31.21, echoing the title of Prince's 2006 album 3121.

The show featured Prince and his band playing "in the round" on a stage in the shape of Prince's iconic Love Symbol #2 in the centre of the arena, surrounded by the audience. The set list changed nightly as Prince used code-words to direct his band to his next song choice (from a list of 200 songs that they had rehearsed in advance) on the fly. The concerts were followed by an after-party held at the neighbouring IndigO2 venue, also housed within the O2 facility, and which often saw Prince continue to perform, although these appearances were not guaranteed.

The Earth Tour remains the longest residency to have been held at the venue. The total audience attendance at the concerts was over 351,000.

== Set list ==
Opening night set list

1. UK Music Hall of Fame video intro
2. "Purple Rain"
3. "Girls & Boys" (includes "D.M.S.R." interpolation)
4. "Satisfied"
5. "Cream"
6. "U Got the Look"
7. "Shhh"
8. "Musicology"
9. "I Feel for You"
10. "Controversy" (includes "Housequake" interpolation)
11. "What a Wonderful World" (Instrumental) (performed by Renato Neto and Mike Phillips)
12. "Somewhere Here on Earth"
13. "Lolita"
14. "Black Sweat"
15. "Kiss"
16. "If I Was Your Girlfriend"
17. "Pink Cashmere" (includes "The One U Wanna C" lyrics)
18. "7"
19. "Come Together"
20. "Take Me with U"
21. "Guitar"
22. "Planet Earth"
23. "Crazy" (includes "One Nation Under a Groove" interpolation, performed by Shelby J.)
24. "Nothing Compares 2 U"
25. "Let's Go Crazy"
26. "Little Red Corvette" (Solo guitar set)
27. "Raspberry Beret" (Solo guitar set)
28. "Sometimes It Snows in April" (Solo guitar set)
29. "Get on the Boat"
30. "A Love Bizarre"
31. "Sexy Dancer"/"Le Freak" (vocals by Shelby J. and Marva King)

== Band lineup ==
Prince	Vox, Guitar, Bass, Keyboard/Piano, Sampler	
Cora Coleman-Dunham	Drums	
Josh Dunham	Bass	
Morris Hayes	Keyboards	
Renato Neto	Keyboards	
Maceo Parker	Saxophone	shows until 1 September 2007 & 21 September 2007
Greg Boyer	Trombone	
Mike Phillips	Saxophone, Vocoder	
Lee Hogans	Trumpet	
Maya McClean	Dance, Backing vox	The McClean sisters are collectively known as "The Twinz"
Nandy McClean	Dance, Backing vox	The McClean sisters are collectively known as "The Twinz"
Shelby J.	Backing vox	
Marva King	Backing vox	

== Shows ==
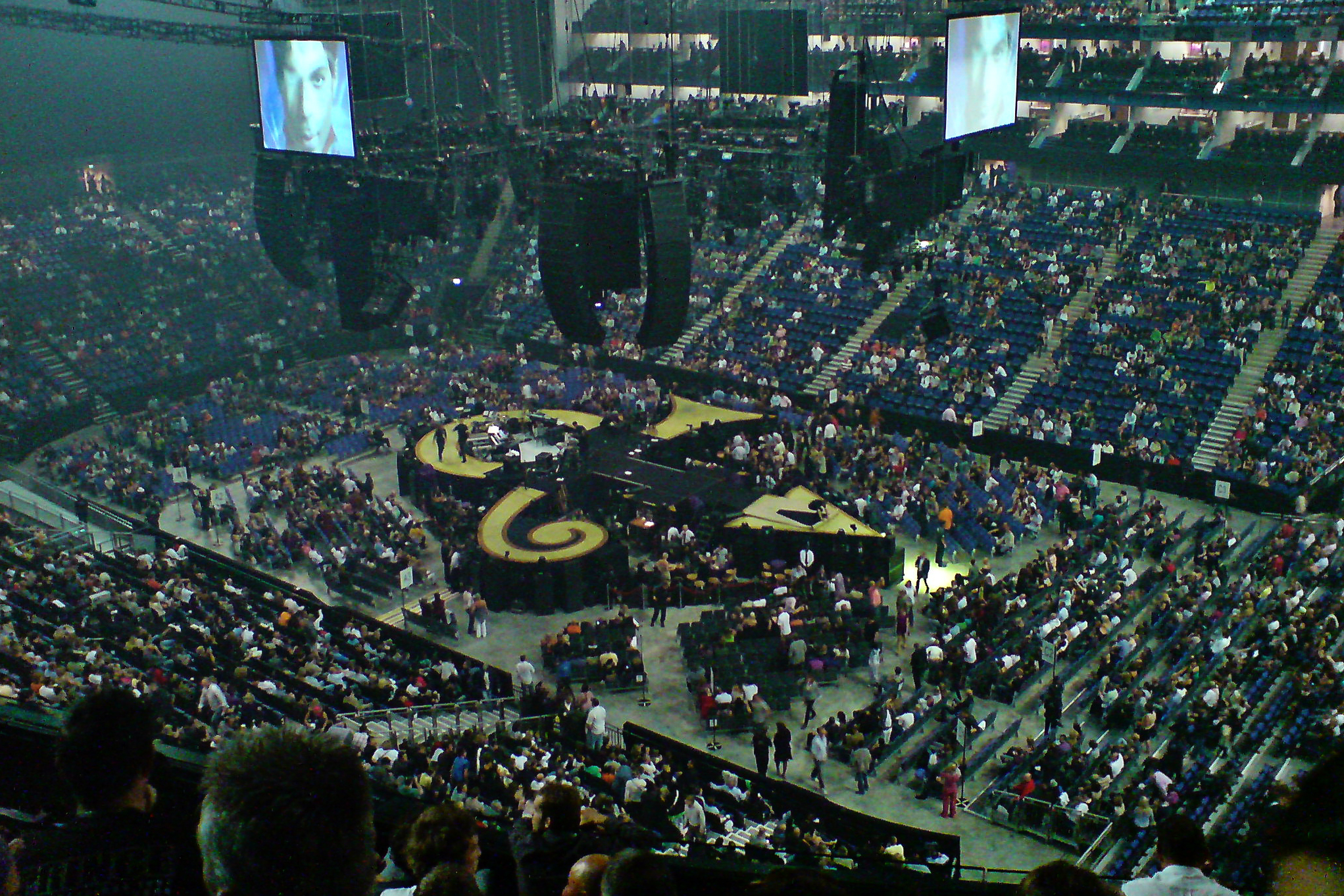
Prince’s stage for the Earth Tour

Date	Attendance	Revenue
August 1, 2007	351,527 / 351,527	$22,052,026
August 3, 2007	351,527 / 351,527	$22,052,026
August 4, 2007	351,527 / 351,527	$22,052,026
August 7, 2007	351,527 / 351,527	$22,052,026
August 10, 2007	351,527 / 351,527	$22,052,026
August 11, 2007	351,527 / 351,527	$22,052,026
August 14, 2007	351,527 / 351,527	$22,052,026
August 17, 2007	351,527 / 351,527	$22,052,026
August 18, 2007	351,527 / 351,527	$22,052,026
August 24, 2007	351,527 / 351,527	$22,052,026
August 25, 2007	351,527 / 351,527	$22,052,026
August 28, 2007	351,527 / 351,527	$22,052,026
August 31, 2007	351,527 / 351,527	$22,052,026
September 1, 2007	351,527 / 351,527	$22,052,026
September 6, 2007	351,527 / 351,527	$22,052,026
September 9, 2007	351,527 / 351,527	$22,052,026
September 12, 2007	351,527 / 351,527	$22,052,026
September 13, 2007	351,527 / 351,527	$22,052,026
September 16, 2007	351,527 / 351,527	$22,052,026
September 20, 2007	351,527 / 351,527	$22,052,026
September 21, 2007	351,527 / 351,527	$22,052,026
Total	351,527 / 351,527 (100%)	$22,052,026
