= Welcome 2 America =

Studio album by Prince
- Released: July 30, 2021
- Recorded: March–April 2010
- Studios: Paisley Park, Chanhassen, Minnesota, US
- Genres: Funk; soul; rock
- Length: 54:21
- Labels: NPG; Legacy
- Producer: Prince

Prince chronology
Originals (2019)	Welcome 2 America (2021)	Timeless (2026)

Welcome 2 America is the fortieth studio album by American musician Prince. It was posthumously released on NPG Records on July 30, 2021. Recorded in March 2010 before the Welcome 2 America Tour, it is the first full previously unreleased studio album of Prince material to be released posthumously. The album would be followed by Prince’s 41st and second posthumous album Timeless, which was released on August 28, 2026.

== Background ==
In 2008, 21-year-old Tal Wilkenfeld received a phone call from Prince. The Australian-born musician was surprised to hear Prince on the other end of the line, who said he had been watching YouTube videos of her on repeat. Prince brought Wilkenfeld to parties at his Los Angeles home where sometimes he and his band played and she was their lone audience member, spent a few days jamming in a local studio and drove around together in a limo listening to music.

In 2009, Prince called Wilkenfeld from Minneapolis and said that he wanted to put together a trio with her, asking Wilkenfeld to find them a drummer. They settled on Chris Coleman, and Prince flew the two musicians to Paisley Park for the first time in late 2009. In March 2010, Wilkenfeld travelled to Paisley Park and began to improvise and play chords on instruction from Prince. "I just made everything up; he gave me no direction about what to play beyond a chord here or there. It was just do your thing," Wilkenfeld explained. "I never heard the lyrics, never knew what the songs were about, never heard the melody. It was like we had to be psychic when we were playing," she added. The result of this work culminated in Welcome 2 America.

Prince started out recording instrumental tracks live in the studio with Wilkenfeld and Coleman. Then Prince recorded New Power Generation singers Liv Warfield, Shelby Johnson and Elisa Fiorillo, sharing leads and harmonies with them. Morris Hayes added keyboards and simulated string and horn arrangements, earning credit as co-producer for six of the album's 12 songs. Prince told Wilkenfeld that he was feeling inspired by the Jimi Hendrix Experience. "Even though it later evolved into having keyboards and background vocals," says Wilkenfeld, "the album was essentially recorded as a trio, so it has that raw vibe."

It is unknown why the album was shelved for 11 years. Even a decade later, those who worked on the album still don't totally understand why. "That was a surprise to me," Morris Hayes says. If he had to guess, Prince might've axed it because not all of the album's collaborators including Wilkenfeld were able to join Prince on the road. "I only surmised that if he couldn't put this album out with the crew he created it with, then I think it was a big mitigating factor in why it hit the shelf," Hayes says. "Prince had this thing where he would shoot first and ask questions later. And if he didn't have commitment from all those people that we could go out and make a big splash – with a new band, a new Prince – then the balloon would just go down. If all those things weren't aligned, that would cause that (music) to go in the vault."

Although the album didn’t release for over a decade, from 2010 to 2012, Prince and The New Power Generation embarked on the Welcome 2 tour, but the tour was reportedly in promotion for Prince’s 35th album 20Ten, which came out the same year, that he and the NPG had previously done the 20Ten Tour for the same year.

On April 8, 2021, the Prince estate announced the release of Welcome 2 America by the Sony Music label Legacy Recordings.

== Songs ==
"Hot Summer" was premiered on Minnesota public radio station 89.3 The Current's website on June 7, 2010, Prince's 52nd birthday, prior to the album's intended release. "Same Page, Different Book" was streamed as audio only over a static video on 3rdeyegirl's YouTube channel in January 2013. "1000 Light Years from Here" was released in an alternative version with new lyrics and arrangements in 2015 on Hit n Run Phase Two as a 3:05 coda to the track "Black Muse". An alternative version of "When She Comes" with different lyrics was also released on Hit n Run Phase Two. "Stand Up and B Strong" is a cover of a song by Soul Asylum, originally released on their 2006 album The Silver Lining.

== Critical reception ==
Professional ratings
Aggregate scores
Source	Rating
AnyDecentMusic?	7.1/10
Metacritic	76/100
Review scores
Source	Rating
AllMusic	3/5 stars
The Daily Telegraph	4/5 stars
The A.V. Club	A−
The Guardian	4/5 stars
The Independent	3/5 stars
PopMatters	7/10
Mojo	4/5 stars
NME	4/5 stars
Pitchfork	6.2/10
Rolling Stone	3.5/5 stars

Welcome 2 America was met with generally positive reviews from music critics. At Metacritic, which assigns a normalized rating out of 100 to reviews from mainstream publications, the album received an average score of 76, based on 16 reviews, indicating "generally favourable reviews".

Noel Murray from The A.V. Club described Welcome 2 America as "fantastic" and as an "incredibly entertaining and vital set of music". Andrew Trendell from NME wrote that it's an album "that speaks to today's problems and demands to be heard". Writing for Rolling Stone, Kory Grow opined that Welcome 2 America contains "stronger songs and sharper messages than much of the music he [Prince] released during his final years". Grow explained that the "grooves are funkier, the sex jams are sexier, and the Curtis Mayfield homages are superflyier".

Jon Pareles, reviewing the album for The New York Times, wrote: "The songs take on racism, exploitation, disinformation, celebrity, faith and capitalism: '21st century, it's still about greed and fame,' Prince sings in 'Running Game (Son of a Slave Master).' Eleven years after the album was recorded—as the 2020s have brought bitter divisiveness, blatant racism, battles over history and a digital hellscape of hyped consumption and algorithmically boosted lies—Prince doesn't sound pessimistic, just matter-of-fact."

== Track listing ==
All tracks are written by Prince, except where noted.

Welcome 2 America track listing
No.	Title	Writer(s)	Length
1.	"Welcome 2 America"		5:23
2.	"Running Game (Son of a Slave Master)"		4:05
3.	"Born 2 Die"		5:03
4.	"1000 Light Years from Here"		5:46
5.	"Hot Summer"		3:32
6.	"Stand Up and B Strong"	Dave Pirner	5:18
7.	"Check the Record"		3:28
8.	"Same Page, Different Book"	Prince; Shelby Johnson	4:41
9.	"When She Comes"		4:46
10.	"1010 (Rin Tin Tin)"		4:42
11.	"Yes"		2:56
12.	"One Day We Will All B Free"		4:41
Total length:			54:21

== Personnel ==
Performers

- Prince – lead vocals, background vocals, guitars, keyboards, percussion, handclaps, drum machine; synth bass (10–12); all instruments (10)
- Tal Wilkenfeld – bass guitar on all tracks except 4, 10
- Chris Coleman – drums
- Morris Hayes – keyboards, percussion (1–3, 5, 7–8)
- Shelby Johnson – background vocals
- Liv Warfield – background vocals
- Elisa Fiorillo – background vocals

== Charts ==
=== Weekly charts ===
Chart performance for Welcome 2 America
Chart (2021)	Peak position
Australian Albums (ARIA)	5
Austrian Albums (Ö3 Austria)	3
Belgian Albums (Ultratop Flanders)	2
Belgian Albums (Ultratop Wallonia)	2
Canadian Albums (Billboard)	26
Czech Albums (ČNS IFPI)	92
Danish Albums (Hitlisten)	12
Dutch Albums (Album Top 100)	2
Finnish Albums (Suomen virallinen lista)	27
French Albums (SNEP)	4
German Albums (Offizielle Top 100)	3
Irish Albums (Official Charts)	25
Italian Albums (FIMI)	26
Japan Hot Albums (Billboard Japan)	12
Japanese Albums (Oricon)	10
Norwegian Albums (VG-lista)	39
Polish Albums (ZPAV)	42
Portuguese Albums (AFP)	2
Scottish Albums (Official Charts)	3
Slovak Albums (ČNS IFPI)	83
Spanish Albums (Promusicae)	7
Swedish Albums (Sverigetopplistan)	53
Swiss Albums (Schweizer Hitparade)	2
UK Albums (Official Charts)	5
UK R&B Albums (Official Charts)	2
US Billboard 200	4
US Top R&B/Hip-Hop Albums (Billboard)	2
US Indie Store Album Sales (Billboard)	3

=== Year-end charts ===
Year-end chart performance for Welcome 2 America
Chart (2021)	Position
Belgian Albums (Ultratop Flanders)	161
Swiss Albums (Schweizer Hitparade)	93
