= Shelby J. =

American singer/songwriter (born 1972)

- Born: Shelby Johnson; September 10, 1972 (age 53); Greensboro, North Carolina
- Genres: Funk, Gospel, R&B
- Occupations: Singer; Songwriter; Musician
- Years active: 1994 - Present

Shelby Johnson (known as Shelby J.) is an American singer/songwriter. She is known for her work with her mentor, Prince, and her debut solo album 10 in 2017.

== Career ==
Shelby J. began performing in 1994 in North Carolina. She reached a worldwide audience with her mix of gospel, R&B, funk, and soul. She performed alongside and collaborated with musical greats, including Carlos Santana, Roy Hargrove, Mary J. Blige, Jonathan Timber, Joel Henry Kiser, Larry Graham, Anthony Hamilton and D’Angelo. She performed on Kmart’s “Right Here, Right Now” marketing campaign, covering the Jesus Jones song.

She joined the New Power Generation in 2006, and contributed to a number of Prince projects, including Planet Earth, 20Ten, and LotusFlow3r. Her largest input was in the posthumous album Welcome 2 America, in which she led vocals and raps on a number of tracks. Prince helped her learn how to lead a band, produce her own music, and succeed as a solo artist, and when they parted ways, told her “don’t come back without that record”.

In December 2012, Shelby J. released a single called "North Carolina", featuring Anthony Hamilton.

In January 2017, single “Good 2 Know” was released to promote her then unnamed album 10.

In April 2017, Shelby J. released 10 with ten songs, along with skits and a spoken word poem recited by her niece.

In December 2018, Shelby J. released "God is Here". While a gospel song, Shelby said she wanted to “paint with all the colors in the box".

In January 2019, Shelby J. was featured on the song "Disco Dislocation", alongside Liv Warfield, from Ida Neilsen’s album Time 2 Stop Worrying.

== Discography ==
=== Studio albums ===
- 10 (2017)

=== Singles ===
- North Carolina (2012)
- Good 2 Know (2017)
- God is Here (2018)
