= Timeless (Prince album) =

2026 posthumous studio album by Prince

Studio album by Prince
- Released: August 28, 2026
- Recorded: 1977–2016, 2026
- Length: 41:46
- Labels: NPG; Legacy
- Producer: Prince

Prince chronology
| Welcome 2 America (2021) | Timeless (2026) |

Singles from Timeless
- 1. "With This Tear" Released: April 20, 2026; 2. "Stone" Released: June 4, 2026

Timeless is the forty-first studio album by American musician Prince, released posthumously on August 28, 2026, via NPG Records.

== Background ==
Timeless compiles ten songs sequenced chronologically by recording date, starting with 1977, a year before his debut with For You, ending with a live recording from 2016, the year of his final tour Piano & a Microphone and his death. The music was mixed and mastered by Chris James, who worked with Prince during the 2010s on projects such as Art Official Age and Hit n Run Phase Two.

Prince wrote the song "Heaven" as a rebuttal of the song "Hello", the B-side of "Raspberry Beret", writing about his view on the world and philosophy on how humans treat each other. It was considered to be a part for his unmade movie The Dawn.

Although the songs on the album were previously unreleased, some of the songs were heard in other renditions. "Tick Tick Bang" was later included on his 1990 soundtrack album Graffiti Bridge for the film of the same name, "With This Tear" was recorded by Canadian singer Celine Dion for her 1992 self-titled album, and "How Come U Don't Call Me Anymore?" was released as the B-side to "1999". "I Wonder" was considered for the abandoned Crystal Ball Volume II.

== Release and reception ==
Professional ratings
Review scores
| Source | Rating |
|---|---|
| Rolling Stone | 2.5/5 stars |
| So It Goes | 2/5 stars |
| Still Listening | 78/100 |
| Tracking Angle | 5/11 |

The first single was "With This Tear", recorded a month after he released Diamonds and Pearls and previously released by Celine Dion as part of her 1992 self titled album. It was chosen to mark the 10th anniversary of Prince's death. The song was released with a music video showing a montage of photographs and footage spanning Prince's career, including images as far back as 1958.

On June 4, 2026, Prince's estate announced the album along with its second single, "Stone". Listening parties were held at Paisley Park in Minneapolis until June 7. The album was released on August 28, 2026, on streaming services, CD, and two options of vinyl, standard black and purple marble. The album was accompanied with a new music video for the song "The Guilty Ones".

The album received mostly negative critical reviews, although praise was given for Chris James' new mixes and masters. Critics noted how the selection of songs that appear on the album were not his best with no flair or massive highlights. Tracking Angle called the album's packaging "awful" and felt that considering its "thoughtless design" that it was made using generative AI.

=== Overdubbing controversy ===
Prince's estate's co-executor Charles F. Spicer Jr. had initially stated that the album would receive no overdubs or rerecordings, but when the album was released, it was noticed that on the song "Calabama" there were credits for horn players Adrian Crutchfield and Lynn Grissett, even though the song was recorded in 2003 and they debuted with Prince in 2012. Third horn player Greg Boyer revealed on Facebook that three of the horn players had recorded the overdubs months prior to the album's release. Spicer later posted online to make a correction.

Following the release of Timeless, the management of the Prince estate faced significant criticism from several music publications. The Second Disc announced that it would suspend coverage of future posthumous Prince releases, citing concerns over the estate's management practices. Additionally, outlets including Tracking Angle published highly critical reviews of the album's production and expressed pessimism regarding the curation of Prince's legacy.

The original recording of the track without overdubs alongside a four-track digital EP of the same name was later released digitally on October 9th.

== Track listing ==
All tracks are written by Prince, except where noted.

| No. | Title | Writer(s) | Year recorded | Length |
|---|---|---|---|---|
| 1. | "I Am You" | | 1977 | 4:44 |
| 2. | "Tick Tick Bang" | | 1981 | 3:13 |
| 3. | "Heaven" | | 1985 | 4:29 |
| 4. | "I Wonder" | | 1989 | 4:11 |
| 5. | "With This Tear" | | 1991 | 3:52 |
| 6. | "Stone" | Prince; Tom Hammer; Sandra St. Victor; Jules van Even | 1995 | 3:07 |
| 7. | "Calabama" | | 2003, 2026 | 3:31 |
| 8. | "The Guilty Ones" | | 2007 | 4:15 |
| 9. | "Bestest Friend" | | 2012 | 4:38 |
| 10. | "How Come U Don't Call Me Anymore?" (live at the Oracle Arena, March 4, 2016) | | 2016 | 5:54 |
| Total length: | | | | 41:46 |

== Personnel ==
Adapted from Tidal and liner notes.

=== Musicians ===
- Prince – vocals, instruments
- Susannah Melvoin – vocals (track 3)
- Michael B. – drums (track 5)
- Kirky J. – percussion (track 5), drums and programming (track 6)
- Sonny T. – bass guitar (track 5)
- John Blackwell – drums (track 7)
- Greg Boyer, Adrian Crutchfield, Lynn Grissett – horns (track 7)
- Cora Coleman Dunham – drums (track 8)
- Josh Dunham – bass guitar (track 8)
- Shelby J., Marva King – backing vocals (track 8)
- Kenni Holmen, Dave Jensen, Kathy Jensen, Michael B. Nelson, Steve Strand – horns (track 9)

=== Production ===
- Prince – producer
- David Ravkin – recording engineer (track 1)
- Ross Pallone – recording engineer (track 2)
- Peggy McCreary – recording engineer (track 3)
- Femi Jiya – recording engineer (track 4)
- Steve Noonan – recording engineer (track 5)
- Steve Durkee, Ray Hahnfeldt – recording engineers (track 6)
- Joe Lepinski – recording engineer (track 7)
- Ian Boxill – recording engineer (track 8)
- Chris James – recording engineer (track 9), mixing and mastering engineer
- Susan Rogers – assistant engineer (track 3)
- David Friedlander – assistant engineer (track 4)
- Brain Poer – assistant engineer (track 5)
- Shane T. Keller – assistant engineer (track 6)

=== Technical ===
- Tora Bliss – art direction

== Charts ==
Chart performance for Timeless
| Chart (2026) | Peak position |
|---|---|
| Australian Albums (ARIA) | 45 |
| Australian Hip Hop/R&B Albums (ARIA) | 7 |
| Austrian Albums (Ö3 Austria) | 5 |
| Belgian Albums (Ultratop Flanders) | 4 |
| Belgian Albums (Ultratop Wallonia) | 3 |
| Danish Vinyl Albums (Hitlisten) | 2 |
| Dutch Albums (Album Top 100) | 6 |
| French Albums (SNEP) | 30 |
| German Albums (Offizielle Top 100) | 14 |
| German Pop Albums (Offizielle Top 100) | 7 |
| Italian Albums (FIMI) | 57 |
| Japanese Albums (Oricon) | 21 |
| Japanese Combined Albums (Oricon) | 37 |
| Japanese Download Albums (Billboard Japan) | 17 |
| Norwegian Physical Albums (IFPI Norge) | 3 |
| Portuguese Albums (AFP) | 157 |
| Scottish Albums (Official Charts) | 18 |
| Spanish Albums (Promusicae) | 95 |
| Swedish Physical Albums (Sverigetopplistan) | 11 |
| Swiss Albums (Schweizer Hitparade) | 1 |
| UK Albums (Official Charts) | 62 |
| US Billboard 200 | 59 |
| US Top R&B/Hip-Hop Albums (Billboard) | 14 |
