= Prince 20Ten =

2010 concert tour by Prince

- Tour by Prince
- Poster to the concert in Werchter, Belgium
- Location: Europe; Asia
- Associated album: 20Ten
- Start date: July 4, 2010
- End date: November 18, 2010
- Legs: 2
- No. of shows: 14 in Europe; 1 in Asia; 15 in total (24 scheduled)

Prince concert chronology
- The Earth Tour: 21 Nights in London (2007); Prince 20Ten (2010); Welcome 2 (2010–12)

Prince 20Ten was a concert tour performed by American recording artist Prince in 2010 to promote his 20Ten album. The tour was divided in two legs, the first set of shows were from July 4 to July 25. The tour kicked off in Denmark and took Prince to Germany, France, Belgium, Austria, and Portugal. Larry Graham and Mint Condition were supporting acts. He rehearsed them in Paisley Park Studios. The second leg was from October 15 to November 18. He played these dates with a slightly different band and no supporting acts. This leg of the tour took him to Norway, Denmark, Italy, Belgium, and the Netherlands. He also took the tour to the United Arab Emirates where he performed at the Abu Dhabi Grand Prix.

== Set list ==
The set list and duration varied heavily during the tour. During a single concert Prince would perform between 25 and 45 songs from the list below.

- "1999"
- "7"
- "A Love Bizarre"
- "A Sós com a Noite" (Ana Moura song, performed with Ana Moura at the Portugal concert)
- "Act of God"
- "Alphabet St."
- "Angel" (performed by the backing vocalists)
- "Cream"
- "Crimson and Clover"
- "Controversy"
- "Dance (Disco Heat)"
- "Everyday People"
- "Forever in My Life"
- "Guitar"
- "How Come U Don't Call Me Anymore?"
- "I Know You Got Soul"
- "I Want to Take You Higher"
- "Jungle Love"
- "Kiss"
- "Lean on Me"
- "Let's Go Crazy"
- "Little Red Corvette"
- "Mountains"
- "Musicology"
- "Nothing Compares 2 U"
- "Ol' Skool Company"
- "Partyman"
- "Peach"
- "Purple Rain"
- "Sexy Dancer"/"Le Freak" (mash-up)
- "Shake Your Body (Down to the Ground)" (vocals by vocals by Elisa Dease)
- "Sometimes It Snows In April"
- "Shhh"
- "Spanish Castle Magic"
- "Stratus"
- "Take Me with U"
- "The Bird"
- "The Love We Make"
- "The Glamorous Life"
- "The Question of U"/"The One" (mash-up)
- "U Got the Look"
- "Venus de Milo"
- "Vou Dar de Beber à Dor" (Ana Moura song, performed with Ana Moura at the Portugal concert)
- "When Will We B Paid?"
- "Why You Wanna Treat Me So Bad?"
- "When You Were Mine"

Set list of July 4, 2010, at the Festivalpladsen, Roskilde, Denmark

1. "Venus de Milo" (performed by Cassandra O'Neal on keyboards and vocals, sans Prince)
2. "Let's Go Crazy"
3. "Delirious" ft Frederic Yonnet (includes "Let's Go Crazy" coda)
4. "1999"
5. "Little Red Corvette"
6. "Controversy" (includes "(I Like) Funky Music" chants)
7. "Sexy Dancer"/"Le Freak" (includes "Controversy" coda and "Housequake" chants) (performed with Shelby J., Liv Warfield and Elisa Dease)
8. "Why You Wanna Treat Me So Bad?"
9. "Take Me with U" (performed with Sheila E.)
10. "Guitar"
11. "Angel" (performed with Shelby J., Liv Warfield and Elisa Dease)
12. "Lean on Me" (performed with Elisa Dease)
13. "Nothing Compares 2 U" (performed with Shelby J., with fake jazz arrangement)
14. "Purple Rain"

Encore

1. "Mountains" (includes "Shake Your Body (Down to the Ground)", performed by Elisa Dease)
2. "Everyday People"
3. "I Want to Take You Higher" (includes "Love Rollercoaster" interpolation)

Encore 2

1. "Kiss"

Encore 3

1. "Dance (Disco Heat)" (performed with Shelby J., Liv Warfield and Elisa Dease)

Set list of July 13, 2010, at the Wiener Stadhalle, Vienna, Austria

1. "Purple Rain" (performed with Sheila E.)
2. "Let's Go Crazy" (performed with Sheila E.)
3. "Delirious" (includes "Let's Go Crazy" coda) (performed with Sheila E.)
4. "1999" (performed with Sheila E.)
5. "Shhh"
6. "Cream" (performed with Sheila E.)
7. "Dreamer"
8. "Stratus"
9. "The Glamorous Life" (performed with Sheila E., sans Prince)
10. "The Question of U" (Instrumental)/"The One" (includes "Fallin'" and "Electric Man" interpolations) (performed with Sheila E.)
11. "Musicology" (includes "Housequake" percussion interpolation, "Tighten Up" vocal interpolation and "Watermelon Man" segue-coda) (performed with Sheila E.)
12. "Take Me with U" (performed with Sheila E.)
13. "Kiss" (performed with Sheila E.)
14. "Nothing Compares 2 U" (performed with Shelby J.)

Encore

1. "The Bird" (performed with Sheila E.)
2. "Jungle Love" (includes "Play That Funky Music" and "(I Like) Funky Music" chants) (performed with Sheila E.)
3. "A Love Bizarre" (includes "(I Like) Funky Music" chants and "I Know You Got Soul" interpolation) (performed with Sheila E.)
4. "Dance (Disco Heat)" (includes "Everybody Loves Me" chants and "Love Rollercoaster" guitar interpolation) (performed with Shelby J., Liv Warfield and Elisa Dease)

Encore 2

1. "How Come U Don't Call Me Anymore?" (includes "Please, Please, Please")

Encore 3

1. "Mountains" (includes "Shake Your Body (Down to the Ground)", performed by Elisa Dease and Sheila E.)
2. "Everyday People" (performed with Sheila E.)
3. "I Want to Take You Higher" (performed with Sheila E.)
4. "Ol' Skool Company" (includes "Purple Rain" tease intro and "Also Sprach Zarathustra" interpolation) (performed with Sheila E.)

Encore 4

1. "Peach" (performed with Sheila E., sans Cora Coleman-Dunham)

== Tour dates ==
List of 2010 concerts
| Date | City | Country | Venue |
|---|---|---|---|
| July 4, 2010 | Roskilde | Denmark | Roskilde Festival |
| July 5, 2010 | Berlin | Germany | Waldbühne |
| July 9, 2010 | Arras | France | La Citadelle |
| July 10, 2010 | Werchter | Belgium | Werchter Festival Park |
| July 13, 2010 | Vienna | Austria | Wiener Stadthalle |
| July 18, 2010 | Lisbon | Portugal | Super Bock Super Rock |
| July 25, 2010 | Nice | France | Stade Charles-Ehrmann |
| October 18, 2010 | Bergen | Norway | Vestlandshallen |
| October 20, 2010 | Copenhagen | Denmark | Forum Copenhagen |
| October 22, 2010 | Herning | Denmark | Jyske Bank Boxen |
| November 2, 2010 | Rome | Italy | PalaLottomatica |
| November 3, 2010 | Milan | Italy | Mediolanum Forum |
| November 8, 2010 | Antwerp | Belgium | Sportpaleis |
| November 14, 2010 | Abu Dhabi | United Arab Emirates | Du Arena |
| November 18, 2010 | Arnhem | Netherlands | GelreDome |

=== Box office score data ===
| Venue | City | Tickets Sold / Available | Gross Revenue |
|---|---|---|---|
| Sportpaleis | Antwerp | 14,391 / 15,719 (92%) | $1,865,020 |

== Band ==
- Prince: Lead Vocals and Guitar
- Cora Coleman Dunham: Drums [First Leg]
- John Blackwell: Drums [Second Leg]
- Joshua Dunham: Bass [First Leg]
- Ida Nielsen: Bass [Second Leg]
- Cassandra O' Neal: Keyboards
- Morris Hayes: Keyboards
- Renato Neto: Keyboards [Second Leg]
- Shelby Johnson: Vocals
- Elisa Dease: Vocals
- Liv Warfield: Vocals
- Frédéric Yonnet: Harmonica [First Leg]
- Sheila E.: Percussion and Vocals [Second Leg]

Due to unknown reasons, Sheila E. did not appear after the October 22 show.

- Madje Malki : FOH Sound
- Tifred Lucas : Monitor Sound
- Andy Doig : Lights
