= Bria Valente =

American singer

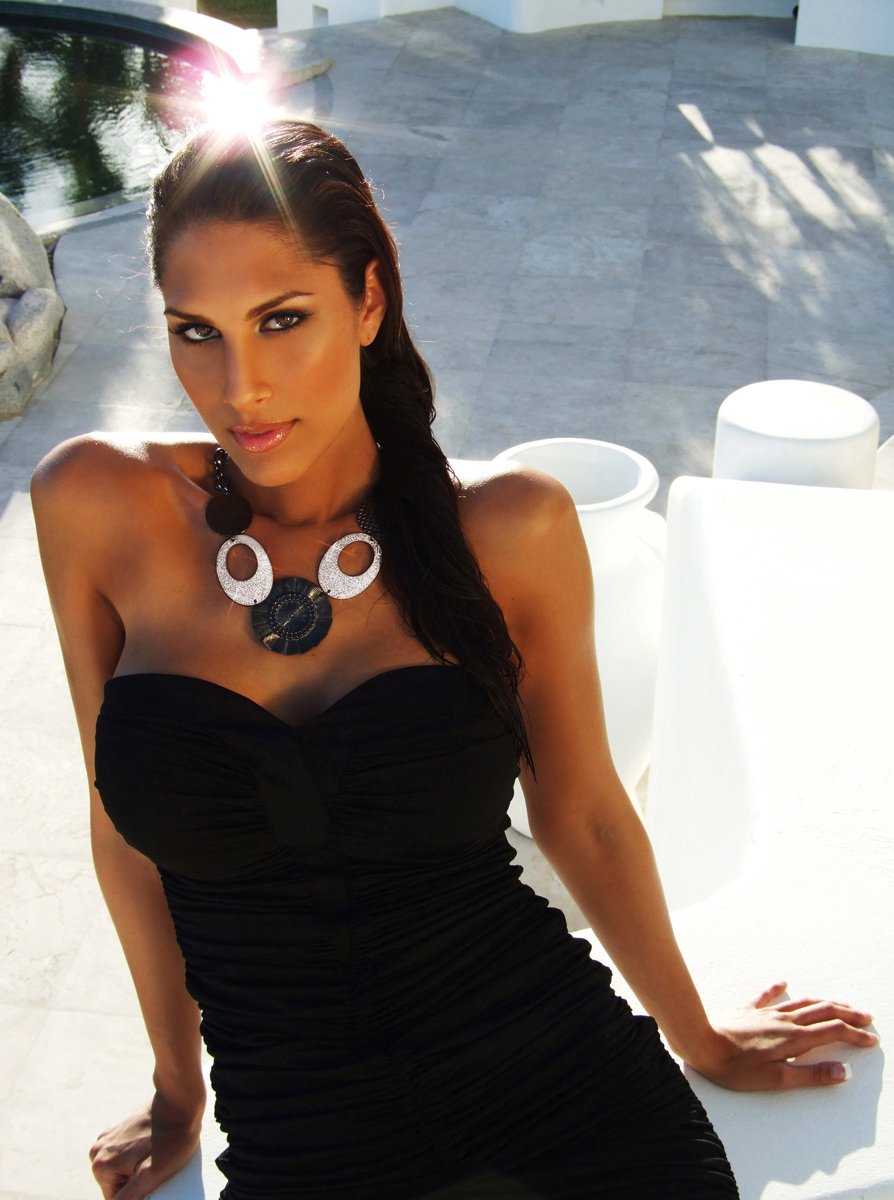
- Bria Valente in December 2006

Background information
- Born: Brenda Fuentes; Minneapolis, Minnesota, U.S.
- Genres: R&B
- Occupations: Singer, model
- Instrument: Vocals
- Years active: 2001–present
- Labels: NPG Records; Purple Music Switzerland

Brenda Fuentes, better known by her stage name Bria Valente, is an American singer and model. A protégée of Prince, Valente released her debut album, Elixer, as part of a three-album set with Prince's Lotusflow3r and MPLSound on March 29, 2009. The collection debuted at number two on the Billboard 200 albums chart.

Valente was born and raised in Minneapolis, Minnesota. She stated in an interview with Tavis Smiley that she first met Prince at the age of 17 at Paisley Park Studios while working with keyboardist Morris Hayes. She later moved to Los Angeles, California, and worked as a model and background dancer for Usher. She is credited with backing vocals on Usher's 2001 album 8701.

Valente returned to Minneapolis, where she began her association with Prince, contributing vocals to his 2007 album, Planet Earth. Valente recorded Elixer in 2009; she sang lead vocals, with Prince on guitar, and Morris Hayes providing beats. Prince described it as a quiet storm-style album. The music review website Metacritic rated the album 49 out of 100, labeling it as having "mixed or average" reception, based on 12 reviews. The album was released through the website lotusflow3r.com, as well as exclusively through American retailer Target.

As of 2010, Valente was Prince's girlfriend. She also became a Jehovah's Witness during this period. Purple Music, a Swiss-based record label released Valente's CD single "2 Nite" on February 23, 2012, as part of a Prince club remixes package including the single "Dance 4 Me" by Prince.

== Discography ==
Albums

- Elixer (2009, NPG Records)

Singles

- "2nite" (2012, Purple Music Switzerland) – remixes by David Alexander and Jamie Lewis, produced by Prince
