= 3121 (disambiguation) =

3121 is a studio album by Prince released in 2006.

It may also refer to:

- 3121 (number)
- 3121 Tamines, a minor planet
- The year 3121 BC
- 4th millennium for the year 3121
