= Fury (song) =

- UK CD single

Single by Prince

from the album 3121
- B-side: "Te Amo Corazón" / "Fury" (Live)
- Released: May 30, 2006
- Recorded: 2005
- Studio: Paisley Park, Chanhassen, Minnesota, US
- Genre: Funk rock, acid rock
- Length: 4:04
- Label: NPG/Universal
- Songwriter: Prince
- Producer: Prince

Prince singles chronology
"Black Sweat" (2006)	"Fury" (2006)	"Guitar" (2007)

"Fury" is a song by Prince, released as the third single from his 2006 album 3121. The single was debuted live on Saturday Night Live on February 4, 2006.

== Track listing ==
=== CD single ===
1. "Fury"
2. "Te Amo Corazón" / "Fury" (Live at BRIT Awards)
3. "Te Amo Corazón" / "Fury" (Live at BRIT Awards) (Video)

=== 12" vinyl (picture disc) ===
1. "Fury"
2. "Te Amo Corazon" / "Fury" (Live at BRIT Awards)

== Charts ==
Chart performance for "Fury"
Chart (2006)	Peak position
Italy (FIMI)	44
Netherlands (Dutch Top 40 Tipparade)	12
Netherlands (Single Top 100)	72
Scottish Singles Sales (Official Charts)	36
Switzerland (Schweizer Hitparade)	92
UK Singles (Official Charts)	60
UK Hip Hop/R&B (Official Charts)	9
