= Super Bowl XLI halftime show =

Halftime show of the 2007 Super Bowl

- Part of: Super Bowl XLI
- Date: February 4, 2007
- Location: Miami Gardens, Florida
- Venue: Dolphin Stadium
- Headliner: Prince
- Special guests: Florida A&M University Marching 100 Band
- Sponsor: Pepsi
- Producer: Don Mischer Productions and White Cherry Entertainment

Super Bowl halftime show chronology
XL (2006)	XLI (2007)	XLII (2008)

The Super Bowl XLI halftime show took place on February 4, 2007, at Dolphin Stadium in Miami Gardens, Florida, as part of Super Bowl XLI. It was headlined by Prince. The performance is widely considered the greatest Super Bowl halftime show of all time. (Note: Attributed to the following sources:)

== Background and development ==
The executive producer of the show was Don Mischer. Mischer's company, Mischer Productions, was the executive producer and director. White Cherry Entertainment, run by Ricky Kirshner and Glenn Weiss, were also executive producers. The production designer was Bruce Rogers. Mischner Productions and White Cherry Entertainment had earlier signed an agreement to produce marquee events, like the entertainment surrounding the NFL Kickoff Game, throughout the 2006 NFL season. For the first time, Pepsi was the sponsor of the halftime show.

After having been uninterested in performing in a Super Bowl halftime show, in 2006, Prince expressed interest. Executives that were in charge of booking an act for the halftime show visited Prince in Los Angeles, and Prince and three members of his backing band New Power Generation performed for the executives. He was announced as the performer on December 10.

In late 2006, representatives for Prince reached out to Julian White, the director of the Florida A&M University Marching 100 Band, and managed to get the band to agree to performing in the show. The involvement of the marching band was largely kept a secret, with New Power Generation keyboardist Morris Hayes sharing later that he did not know of their inclusion until the first rehearsal that included them. Members of the marching band were not told themselves until roughly a month before the show that they would be performing in the halftime show.

One of the ideas Mischer contributed was to have the marching band adorned with illuminated tape, so that would be more visible. One of the centerpiece visual effects utilized involved projecting Prince's silhouette onto a large screen that he stood behind. Air was utilized to make the screen stand erect. This effect was one that Don Mischer had first utilized for the 1996 Summer Olympics opening ceremony.

Much of Prince's rehearsals were in Las Vegas, where Prince had a residency show. They used tape to outline the shape of the stage, as they did not have the actual stage available to them for their Las Vegas rehearsals. In the days before the show, Prince and his band rehearsed in a tent adjacent to the stadium. Prince and his supporting performers only had a single rehearsal on the stadium's field.

During his pre-performance joint press conference with national anthem performer Billy Joel, which halftime and national anthem performers conventionally hold, rather than taking questions, Prince gave the press a mini-concert. Hundreds of volunteers helped to assemble and disassemble the stage. During the stage setup, volunteers accidentally ran over a cable with a rolling part of the stage. A member of the lighting crew responded to the issue by holding the severed ends of the cable in place with his hands for the entire duration of the show.

== Weather ==
The weather during the game had been rainy, and this inclement weather continued into Prince's performance, with a downpour starting during "Purple Rain". This was the first time it rained during a Super Bowl halftime show. There was potential hazard due to the slippery stage, and Prince and his dancers were wearing high-heeled shoes. Further hazard was that electric guitars were used. Prince is said to have reveled in the weather, with some involved in the show later reporting that Prince asked if the show-runners could "make it rain harder".

== Synopsis ==
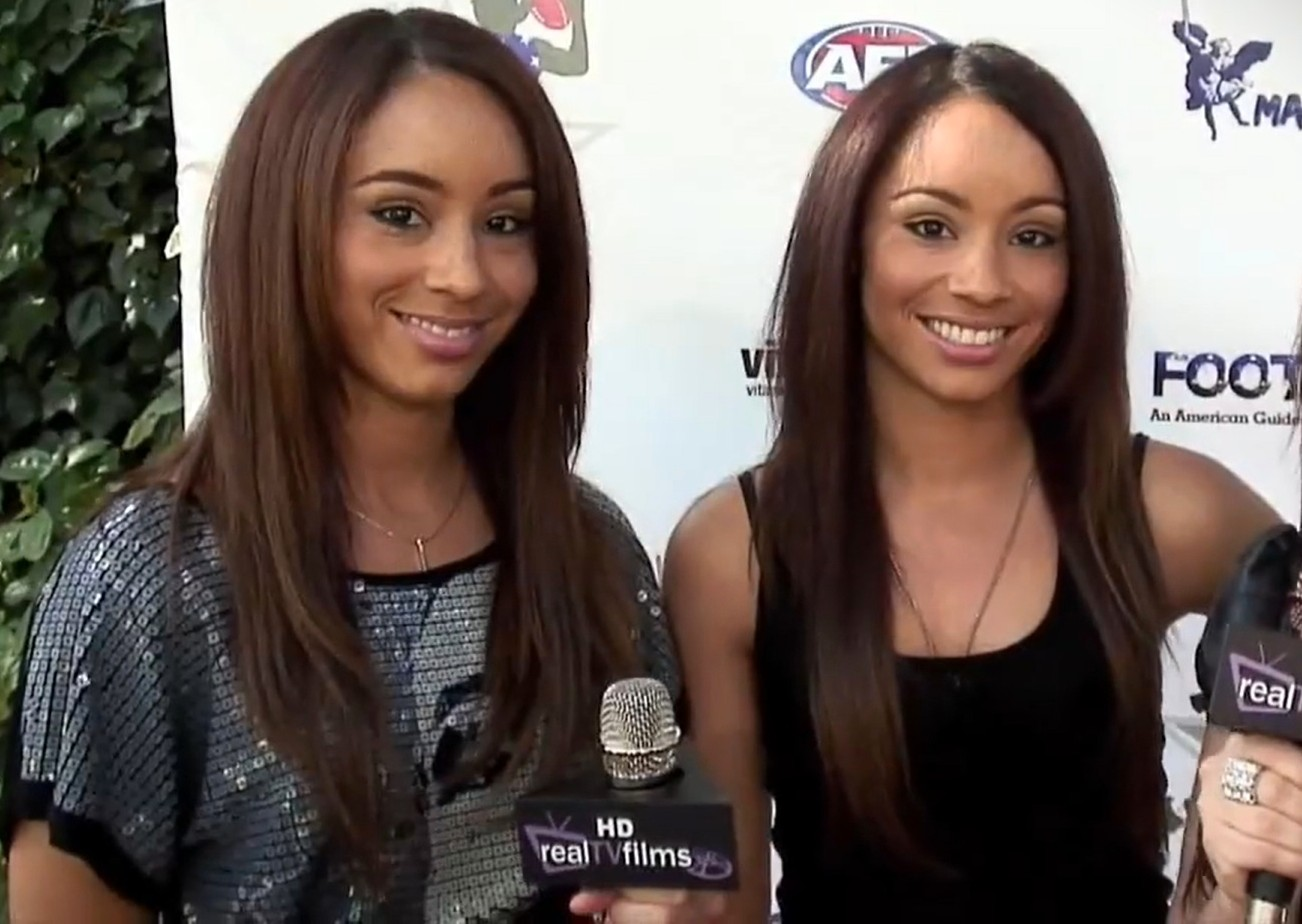
Maya and Nandy McClean in 2010

The show ran for 12 minutes. Prince wore a turquoise suit and had a scarf over his hair. He performed on a large stage shaped like his signature "love symbol". The edges of the stage had neon lighting. During the show, he was accompanied by his backing band New Power Generation. He was also accompanied by the duo "The Twinz", which consisted of identical twins Maya and Nandy McClean, who had previously toured with Prince. Additionally, for some songs, he was accompanied by the Florida A&M University Marching 100 Band. The marching band had their uniforms adorned with illuminated tape.

The performance began with an intro based on the Queen song "We Will Rock You". Fireworks were launched during this intro, and lighting effects simulating lightning were also utilized. Prince then came on stage, rising via a stage elevator, and performed his hit song "Let's Go Crazy". During this song, Prince included an ad-libbed call and response from the crowd.

Joined by the Florida A&M University Marching 100 Band, he performed a medley of songs: "Baby I'm a Star", "1999", and the Creedence Clearwater Revival song "Proud Mary". He then performed a medley of Bob Dylan's song "All Along the Watchtower" and the Foo Fighters song "Best of You". For these songs, the marching band's instruments were not utilized.

As the final song of the performance, he performed the song "Purple Rain". The marching band again accompanied him for the song. During the song's guitar solo, Prince played his guitar positioned behind a screen that had risen from under the stage, having his silhouette projected onto the screen.

== Reception ==
=== Critical ===
The performance was widely acclaimed. Kelefa Sanneh of The New York Times wrote that the performance would "surely go down as one of the most thrilling halftime shows ever; certainly the most unpredictable, and perhaps the best." Mark Caro, of the Chicago Tribune, wrote that Prince's performance, "for once, justified the existence of a mini-concert sandwiched between halves of football." Many have opined that the rainy weather actually added to the performance, especially during Prince's rendition of "Purple Rain".

=== Rankings ===
Numerous outlets have retrospectively ranked the performance as the greatest Super Bowl halftime show of all time.

Rankings for Super Bowl Halftime Show XLI
Publication	Accolade	Rank	Ref.
CBS Sports	Super Bowl 2018 halftime show rankings: Where every performance ranks, from worst to first	1	
Rolling Stone	Every Super Bowl Halftime Show, Ranked From Worst to Best	1	
The Oregonian	26 Super Bowl halftime shows ranked from best to worst, including J-Lo and Shakira	1	
Thrillist	The Greatest Super Bowl Halftime Shows of All Time, Ranked	1	
Vulture	Every Super Bowl Halftime Show Since 1993, Ranked	1	
NBC Sports	Ranking the best Super Bowl halftime shows in history	1	
Billboard	The 15 Best Super Bowl Halftime Shows	1	

== Commercial reception ==
Prince's physical album sales increased to 31,000 in the week after his performance, as compared to 14,000 the week before. According to SoundScan, his digital sales increased to 102,000 in the week after his performance, as compared to the 59,000 the week prior. Additionally, his sales on Amazon increased 700%.

== Legacy ==
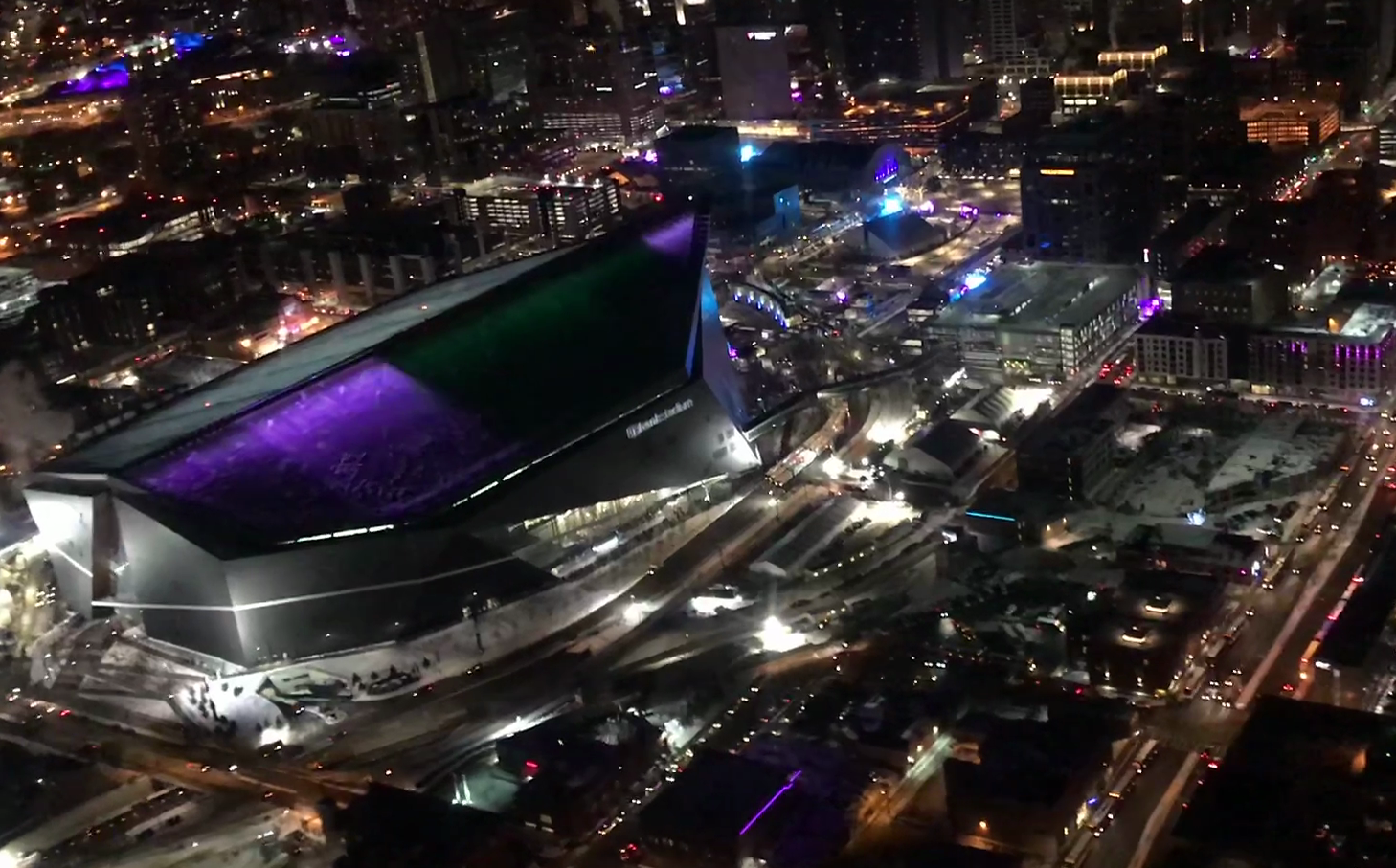
U.S. Bank Stadium and the city of Minneapolis were lit purple during Timberlake's tribute to Prince

Recording artist, Justin Timberlake, made a controversial tribute to Prince during Super Bowl LII halftime show which took place in Prince's hometown.

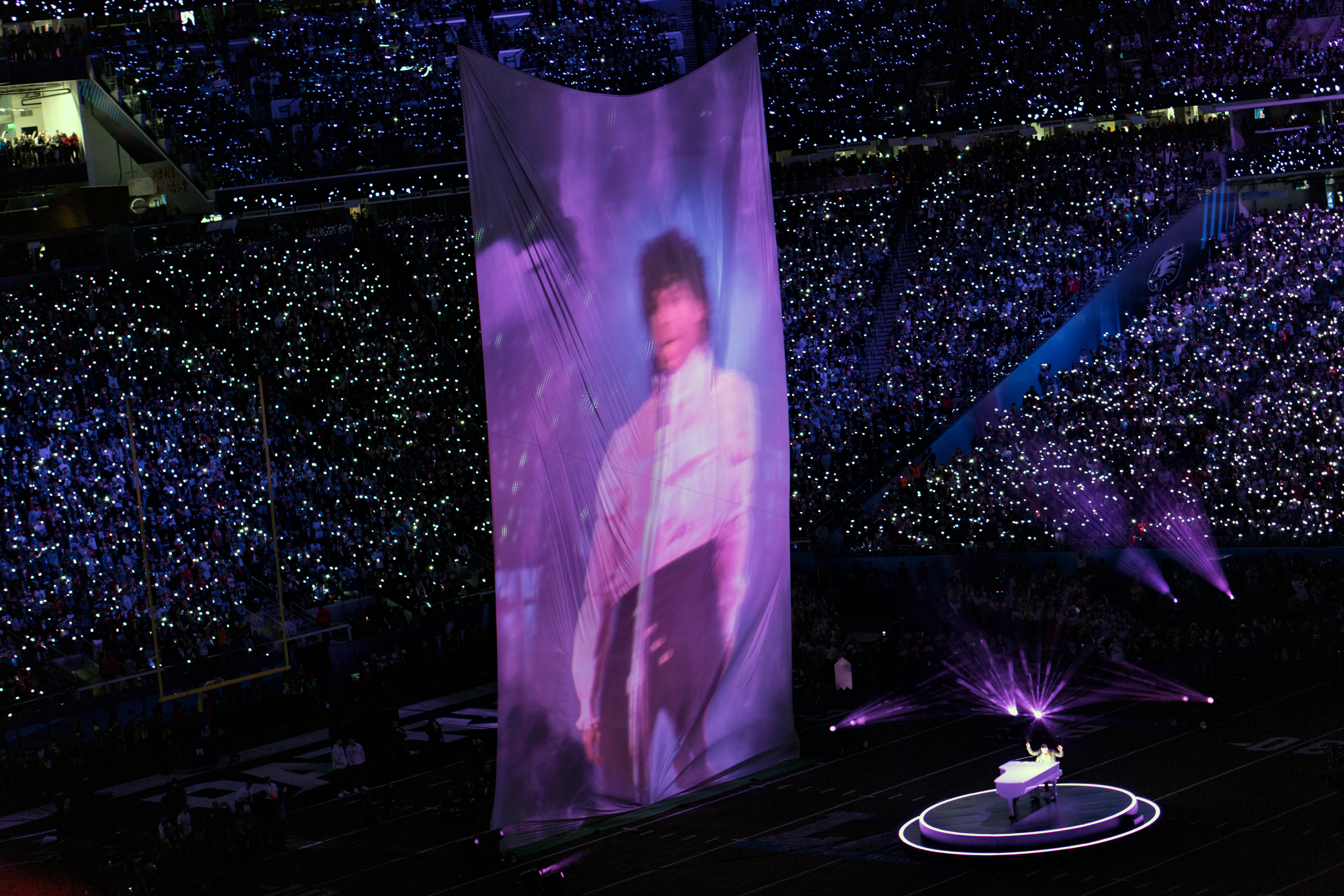
Timberlake performing alongside a video projection of Prince

Timberlake performed a cover of "I Would Die 4 U". A video of Prince performing the song played in the background, projected onto a large multi-story sheet. An aerial shot showed downtown Minneapolis covered in purple lighting that morphed into Prince's trademark Love Symbol (), with the stadium at the center.

On January 6, 2026, Little Golden Books released a children's biography about Prince. The cover, illustrated by Don Tate, was a depiction of Prince's Super Bowl halftime show outfit.

== Setlist ==
- "We Will Rock You" (Intro)
- "Let's Go Crazy"
- "Baby I'm a Star"/"Proud Mary"/"1999"
- "All Along the Watchtower"/"Best of You"
- "Purple Rain"

== Controversy ==
There was some controversy that, during a portion of the show where Prince was silhouetted onto a screen, the placement of his guitar was phallic. The Smoking Gun reported that in excess of 150 people had complained to the FCC about the Super Bowl broadcast, with the majority of complaints being about either this or a Snickers commercial which featured two men kissing.
