= MEÏA =

Spanish singer-songwriter and actress

Meïa Santiago is a Spanish singer-songwriter, composer, and actress based between Barcelona and New York City. Her music blends pop, jazz, and soul influences, and she has collaborated with international musicians including Morris Hayes, longtime keyboardist for Prince and musical director of The New Power Generation, and Malcolm Joseph, bassist for Grace Jones.

== Early life and education ==
Meïa Santiago was born in Barcelona and studied at ESEM Taller de Músics, where she earned a BA in Jazz and Modern Music Performance.

== Career ==
=== Music ===
Meïa Santiago released her debut album Lighthouse in 2017 on the Spanish label Picap.

Her discography includes the EP Mülzien 25 (2018), produced by Dani Vega of Mishima, and Stoop #6 (2021), produced by Kelsey Warren (Black Emoji) and released under Paradise Hill Productions (UK).

She has worked with producer Morris Hayes on singles such as I Can't Stay Away From You (2023), Sex Appeal (2024), and Love Is a Rose (2025), distributed by Suite 484 Music/The Orchard.

Meïa Santiago has performed internationally at venues including Joe's Pub, City Winery, DROM, Nublu, Shapeshifter, Arlene's Grocery, Rockwood Music Hall, Silvana, Shrine, and she´s a NYC Sofar Sounds' Artist. In 2025, she appeared at the Wavy Awards Showcase during the New York City Music's Month.

Meïa was selected through jury audition for the legendary Amateur Night and performed live on the iconic Apollo stage (Apollo Theater, New York City (Nov 2024))

From 2022 to 2024, Meïa served as Master of Ceremonies for the annual New York International Infest Film Festival Gala, held at La Nacional Auditorium in New York City.

Meïa was selected as one of the three winners of the Certamen “Mujeres”, organized by the renowned Spanish pop artist Coque Malla. Following her confirmation, she was invited to perform alongside him at the iconic Luz de Gas venue in Barcelona.

=== Acting ===
Beyond music, Santiago has worked as an actress in film and theatre. She performed in Moll Oest (Quay West) by Bernard-Marie Koltès, directed by Sergi Belbel, at the Teatre Romea during Barcelona's Grec Festival. ( FOCUS production)

She has acted in Catalan television (Jetlag, TV3, 2010) and several independent films, including Si dalt d’un terrat (2003, premiered at the Sitges Film Festival and directed by writer and poet Martí Sales ).

In 2017 she co-created and performed Palau Paints Picasso at the Picasso Museum Auditorium, composing original music inspired by Picasso's paintings Guernica and Les Demoiselles d’Avignon.

Lead Role in Meïa’s Under the Sky of Your Tough Love directed by Albert Negrete - Video received Honorable Mention, Best Music Video at Independent Shorts Awards (2019)

Supporting roles in the American independent films Who’s Afraid of Virginia Shorty anf Roko Moro (2023/2024) directed by Levon Manoukian, which have received recognition at several International independent film festivals.

=== Teaching ===
Meïa Santiago has worked in arts education, teaching music, arts, and Spanish in New York City public schools, as well as with organizations such as Bilingual Birdies and Afterschool Collective.

== Awards ==
Santiago's work has received recognition at music and film festivals, including:

- Pop Song of the Year – LDM Music Awards (2025) for Sex Appeal
- Best Original Song – Parai Musical Awards (2024) for Sex Appeal
- Best Music Video (Jury Award) – MP Film Award (2024) for Sex Appeal
- Best Original Song – Purple Sky International Film Awards (2023) for I Can't Stay Away From You
- Best Piece of Music – Aphrodite Film Awards (2018) for Be Gentle, My Love

== Selected discography ==
- Lighthouse (2017) – Picap
- Mülzien 25 (2018) – Prod. Dani Vega
- Stoop #6 (2021) – Prod. Kelsey Warren, Paradise Hill Productions
- I Can't Stay Away From You (2023) – Single, prod. Morris Hayes
- Sex Appeal (2024) – Single, prod. Morris Hayes
- Love Is a Rose (2025) – Single, prod. Morris Hayes
