= F.U.N.K. =

Single by Prince
- Released: November 8, 2007
- Genre: Funk rock
- Length: 7:36
- Label: NPG Digital
- Songwriter: Prince
- Producer: Prince

Prince singles chronology
"Guitar" (2007)	"F.U.N.K." (2007)	"Dance 4 Me" (2009)

"F.U.N.K." is a digital-only single by Prince.

== Background ==
On September 14, 2007, Prince announced that he was going to sue YouTube and eBay because they "appear to choose not to filter out the unauthorized music and film content which is core to their business success." A representative told Reuters, "The problem is that one can reduce it to zero and then the next day there will be 100 or 500 or whatever. This carries on ad nauseam at Prince's expense."

On November 5, 2007, several Prince fan sites formed "Prince Fans United" to fight back against legal requests they claim Prince made to cease and desist all use of photographs, images, lyrics, album covers and anything linked to Prince's likeness. While Prince's lawyers claimed that the use of such representations constituted copyright infringement, the Prince Fans United claimed that the legal actions were "attempts to stifle all critical commentary about Prince". On November 8, 2007, the site received a song named "PFUnk" providing a kind of "unofficial answer" to their movement. On November 20, the song was released on iTunes, retitled "F.U.N.K."

== Voice ==
Prince's voice in "F.U.N.K." has been noticeably pitched high.
