= Super Bowl XL halftime show =

Halftime show of the 2006 Super Bowl

- Part of: Super Bowl XL
- Date: February 5, 2006
- Location: Detroit, Michigan, United States
- Venue: Ford Field
- Headliner: The Rolling Stones
- Sponsor: Sprint Nextel
- Producer: Don Mischer Productions

Super Bowl halftime show chronology
XXXIX (2005)	XL (2006)	XLI (2007)

The Super Bowl XL halftime show took place on February 5, 2006, at Ford Field in Detroit, Michigan, as part of Super Bowl XL. It was headlined by the Rolling Stones.

== Production ==
The show was produced by Don Mischer Productions and sponsored by Sprint Nextel.

The stage was in the form of the group's iconic tongue and lips logo (John Pasche's design first used in 1971 on their Sticky Fingers album). It was the largest stage ever assembled for a Super Bowl halftime show, with 28 separate pieces assembled in five minutes by a 600-member volunteer stage crew.

== Synopsis ==
The show was approximately 12 minutes in duration. The band began their performance with "Start Me Up" (1981), followed by "Rough Justice" from their latest album A Bigger Bang (2005). Mick Jagger introduced the third song, "(I Can't Get No) Satisfaction" (1965), by saying: "Here's one we could have done at Super Bowl I".

== Setlist ==
- "Start Me Up"
- "Rough Justice"
- "(I Can't Get No) Satisfaction"

== Controversies ==
In the wake of the Super Bowl XXXVIII halftime show controversy with Janet Jackson and Justin Timberlake two years earlier, ABC, the broadcaster of Super Bowl XL, and the NFL were keen to avoid controversy. However, the choice of the Rolling Stones sparked controversy in the Detroit community because the band did not represent the music of Detroit and no other artist from the area was included. The NFL took issue with some of the language used in the lyrics of the songs that were in the Rolling Stones setlist, particularly specific lyrics in "Start Me Up" and "Rough Justice". In addition to the lyrics the NFL took issue with, there was worry that Jagger might ad-lib explicitly as well. Conflict between the NFL and the band over these lyrics continued into the days just before the performance, with NFL Chief Operating Officer Roger Goodell even threatening to cancel the Rolling Stones performance and find a last-minute replacement. Ultimately, ABC and the NFL imposed a five-second delay and censored lyrics considered too sexually explicit in the first two songs by briefly turning off Jagger's microphone, with the group having agreed to the censoring.

During the development of the show, there had been another disagreement between the Rolling Stones and the NFL. The Rolling Stones wanted to perform material from their new album, while the NFL wanted them to play well-known hits from their back catalog. Ultimately, the only new song included was "Rough Justice".

== Reception ==
=== Critical ===
Some outlets have retrospectively ranked the performance among the best Super Bowl halftime shows.

=== Commercial ===
The show was viewed by 89.9 million people, more than the audiences for the Oscars, Grammys and Emmy Awards combined.

In the week ending February 5, The Rolling Stones' latest album A Bigger Bang only saw a tiny 9% increase (moving from just 4,000 to 5,000). A week later, it improved by selling 6,000 (up 34%). The group was in the midst of its record-breaking A Bigger Bang Tour, which launched on August 10, 2005, and concluded on August 26, 2007. At its conclusion, it became the highest-grossing tour ever at the time, as reported to Billboard Boxscore, having taken in $558 million.
