= 94 East =

American funk group associated with Prince

94 East was an American funk group formed in December 1975 by Pepe Willie, the former husband of Prince's cousin. Willie was one of the people responsible for getting Prince's career established, and soon enlisted the talents of a teenage Prince and his childhood best friend, André Cymone. Prince also composed one song for them, "Just Another Sucker". 94 East was fronted by Colonel Abrams, one of dance music's early pioneers, who went on to a short solo career with a cluster of big hits. The band disbanded when Prince became a star in his own right. The 94 East recordings were recorded between December 1975 and February 1979. The band was named after Interstate 94, which runs through Minneapolis–Saint Paul, and which, when it was constructed, destroyed a vibrant African American community in Saint Paul known as the Rondo neighborhood.

The group's recordings first saw commercial release beginning in 1985, under the title Minneapolis Genius. Cash Box magazine reviewed the album, commenting, "These early recordings from the band 94 East feature never before released recordings by Prince and Andre Cymone, some of it quite good. All but one track are instrumentals and Prince does not sing. Still, this is a Prince collector's must."

== Discography ==
=== Albums ===
All albums are variations and comprehensive versions of Minneapolis Genius.

- Minneapolis Genius or Minneapolis Genius - The Historic 1977 Recordings (credited as 94 East featuring Prince) (released in 1985 on vinyl and 1987 on CD).
- Symbolic Beginning (credited as 94 East featuring Prince) (released in 1995, double CD)
- One Man Jam (credited as Prince and 94 East) (released in 2000, double CD)
- Just Another Sucker (credited as 94 East) (released in 2004, double CD)

=== Singles ===
- "Just Another Sucker" (1986) (Billboard Hot Black Singles #80)

== See also ==
- Prince associates
