= Dance 4 Me (Prince song) =

Single by Prince
- Released: September 29, 2009
- Recorded: September 2008 – January 2009
- Length: 4:58 (album version); 7:00 (Icon remix)
- Label: NPG
- Songwriter: Prince
- Producer: Prince

Prince singles chronology
"F.U.N.K." (2007)	"Dance 4 Me" (2009)	"Extraloveable" (2011)

"Dance 4 Me" is a song by American musician Prince, released as the third track on his 34th studio album MPLSound. Five months after the album's March 2009 release (one week before the French release), "Dance 4 Me" was released as the album's first single, available only as a download in France on August 31. A month later, "Dance 4" Me (Icon Remix) was released as the album’s first single in North America, available as a download only. Other dance remixes were created by outside producers for potential release.

In December 2011, close to three years after the album's release, Swiss dance music label Purple Music released a new single of "Dance 4 Me", containing remixes of the track by Jamie Lewis and David Alexander, as well as the remixes recorded for potential release in 2009. On December 31, 2011, the single peaked at number 7 on Billboard's Hot R&B/Hip-Hop Singles Sales chart.

== Background ==
Recording dates and studio are unknown, but it is likely that the track was recorded between September 2008 and January 2009 at either Paisley Park Studios in Chanhassen, Minnesota or 77 Beverly Park Ln. in Beverly Hills, California. Remixes were done in mid-2009 at unknown studios. Jamie Lewis recorded a remix in mid-to-late 2011 at an unknown studio.

"Dance 4 Me" was the first and only single to be released from Prince’s 34th studio album MPLSound. It was released digitally in France a week before the album’s release there, and was not available elsewhere. The digital release contains only the album version of the song. On September 29, 2009, David Alexander’s Icon Remix was released on iTunes in North America. Although other remixes, as well as an edit of the song were recorded for a planned maxi-single release, they remain unreleased.

Swiss record label Purple Music released a new version of the single on December 9, 2011, containing three newly created remixes of the track. The CD release also contained the Icon Remix, distributed on iTunes in 2009, as well as 2 other remixes of 2009, which were never made available. Digital versions of the 2011 mixes were made available on December 12, 2011.

== Critical reception ==
Writer Tora Borealis compares the song to others where Prince lusts after a dancing girl such as "Supercute", "The Dance", "Sexy Dancer", "Hot Thing" and "Sexy MF". "The power dynamic has changed. He's not a relatively unknown youngster in thrall of a force of nature beyond his control, he’s a king looking down at a courtesan cavorting for him. It’s the tension between this situation and his latter-day beliefs that make Dance 4 Me one of his greatest songs of the 2000s. The Camille voice is a sure sign he wants to distance himself from the lyrics and he can throw in as many hallelujahs as he likes but it only serves to highlight the funky nastiness that gushes out when Prince overrides the better angels of his nature."

== Track listing ==
2011 single

1. "Dance 4 Me" (Original mix) – 4:58
2. "Dance 4 Me" (Jamie Lewis Revamped Purple mix) – 7:12
3. "Dance 4 Me" (David Alexander Icon mix) – 6:15
4. "Dance 4 Me" (Brian Matrix Da Big Room mix) – 6:41
5. "Dance 4 Me" (Dominatrix mix) – 4:49
6. "Dance 4 Me" (Tribal Drum mix) – 5:13
