= Don Mischer =

American producer (1940–2025)

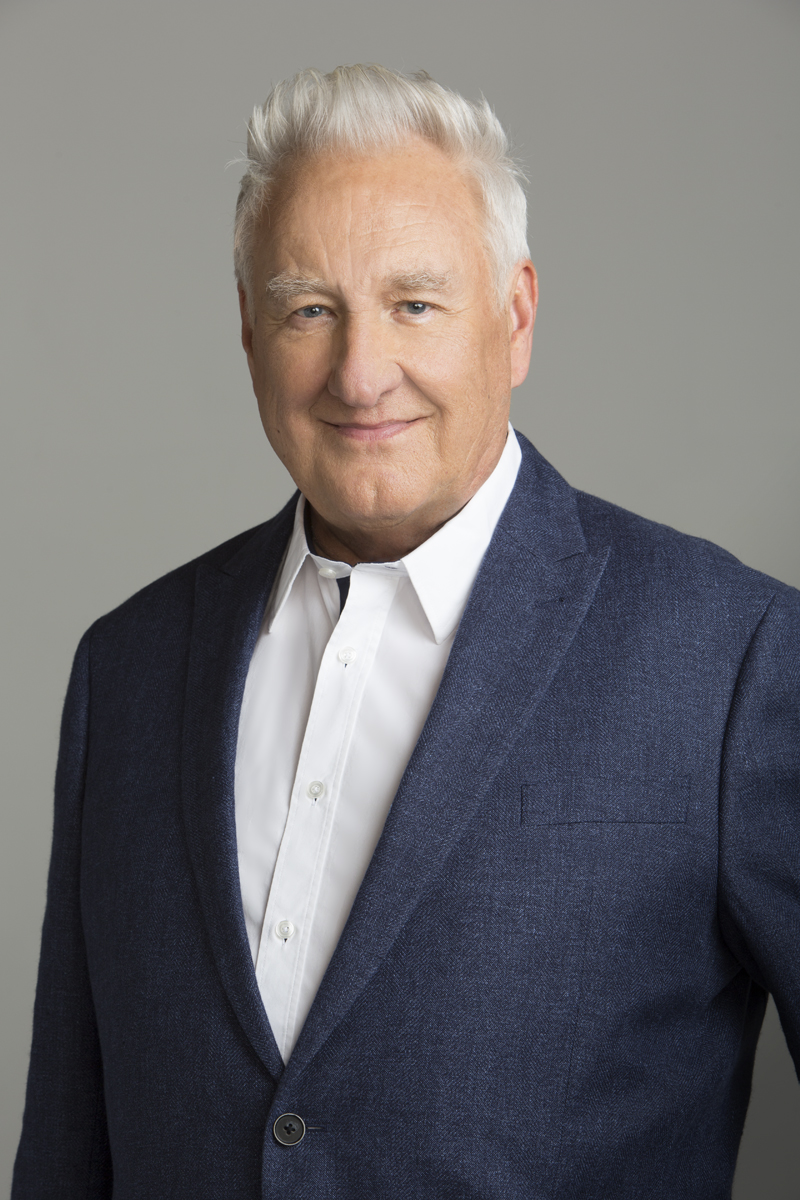
- 2016 portrait
- Born: Donald Leo Mischer; March 5, 1940; San Antonio, Texas, U.S.
- Died: April 11, 2025 (aged 85); Los Angeles, California, U.S.
- Education: University of Texas
- Occupation: Television producer and director
- Years active: 1969–2025
- Spouses: Beverly Meyers (m. 1960; div. 1989) Suzan Reed (m. 1989)
- Children: 4
- Website: Official website

Donald Leo Mischer (March 5, 1940 – April 11, 2025) was an American producer and director of television and live events and president of Don Mischer Productions.

== Career ==
Mischer was honored with fifteen Emmy Awards, a record ten Directors Guild of America Awards for Outstanding Directorial Achievement, two NAACP Image Awards, a Peabody Award for excellence in broadcasting, and the 2012 Norman Lear Achievement Award in Television from the Producers Guild of America and the 2019 Directors Guild of America Lifetime Achievement Award for Television.

As a producer/director, his credits include the Oscars, We Are One: The Obama Inaugural Celebration at the Lincoln Memorial, the Kennedy Center Honors, the 100th anniversary of Carnegie Hall, Motown 25, the Super Bowl Halftime Shows (Michael Jackson, Prince, the Rolling Stones, Paul McCartney, Tom Petty, and Bruce Springsteen), the Democratic National Convention, and the Opening Ceremonies of the 1996 Summer Olympics and 2002 Winter Olympics. Mischer also produced specials with Beyoncé, U2, Prince, Rihanna, Britney Spears, Bruce Springsteen, James Taylor, Taylor Swift, Stevie Wonder, Willie Nelson, Sting, Garth Brooks, Mary J. Blige, Elton John, Justin Timberlake, Barbra Streisand, Cher, Yo Yo Ma, and Dolly Parton among others.

He received the Governors Award from the National Association of Choreographers and was a member of the Event Industry Hall of Fame, the Producers Guild of America, the Directors Guild of America, and the National Academy of Television Arts and Sciences, where he served two terms on the board of governors. As a member of the Directors Guild of America, he served three terms on the National Board, and in 2019 received the DGA's Lifetime Achievement Award for Television, only the fourth such award ever given for television. On December 11, 2014, Mischer received a star on the Hollywood Walk of Fame.

In 2004, he produced the Democratic National Convention at the FleetCenter in Boston. After John Kerry's acceptance speech, balloons were supposed to drop from the ceiling onto the delegates below. However, the balloons got stuck in the ceiling and did not fall. Mischer subsequently lost his temper with his tech crew and his profanities were aired accidentally by CNN's live broadcast.

In November 2023, Mischer published his memoir ":10 Seconds to Air: My Life in the Director's Chair," recounting the entire span of his career. Book review magazine Kirkus Reviews wrote “Mischer's writing style is in formal and charming – he creates an atmosphere of candor and intimacy without going out of his way to ingratiate himself to readers. As a result, his recollection is thoroughly entertaining, but also affecting and thoughtful. A frank, insightful recollection of an accomplished career."

Mischer's last project was the ceremony for the 2025 Breakthrough Prize, which was recorded on April 5, 2025. He had announced his intention to retire beforehand, and ultimately died six days later.

== Personal life and death ==
Mischer was born in San Antonio, Texas, on March 5, 1940, the son of Lillian and Elmer Mischer. After graduating from Douglas MacArthur High School in San Antonio, Mischer completed his education at the University of Texas Austin. He graduated with a BA degree in 1961 and with a master's degree in sociology and political science in 1963. Mischer's work took him to Washington, D.C., where he worked with the US Information Agency and Oscar-winning documentarian Charles Guggenheim.

Mischer and his first wife, Beverly Meyers, had two children before divorcing in 1989.After 10 years in New York, he relocated to Los Angeles, where he had two children with his wife, Suzan Reed Mischer, a former CBS executive and graduate of the Rhode Island School of Design.

Mischer died in Los Angeles on April 11, 2025, at the age of 85.

== Accolades ==
- Mischer had 40 Primetime Emmy nominations, with 15 Emmy wins: 13 wins through The Academy of Television Arts and Sciences, and 2 wins through the National Academy of Television Arts and Sciences
- 10 Directors Guild of America Awards for Outstanding Directorial Achievement
- George Foster Peabody Award for Motown 25: Yesterday, Today, Forever
- Norman Lear Achievement Award in Television, from the Producers Guild of America (2012)
- Directors Guild Lifetime Achievement Award (2019)
- 2 NAACP Image Awards
- Governors Award from the National Association of Choreographers
- Membership in the Event Industry Hall of Fame
- Received Star on the Hollywood Walk of Fame on December 11, 2014
- Lifetime Achievement Award from the International Cinematographers Guild

== Selected television credits ==
| Year | Title | Network | Role | Awards | Notes |
|---|---|---|---|---|---|
| 1970–1971 | Great American Dream Machine | PBS | Director | | |
| 1973–1975 | In Concert | ABC | Director | | |
| 1976 | Twyla Tharp: Making Television Dance | PBS | Director | | |
| 1978–1986; 1992–2005 | The Kennedy Center Honors | CBS | Director | 5 Primetime Emmy Awards, 3 Directors Guild Awards | |
| 1978 | Omnibus: Meryl Streep | ABC | Director | | |
| 1981 | Goldie & Lisa Together | CBS | Producer / director | | |
| 1982 | Shirley McLlain Illusions | NBC | Producer / director | Directors Guild Award | |
| 1982 | Baryshnikov in Hollywood | CBS | Director | 2 Primetime Emmy nominations | |
| 1983 | An Evening with Robin Williams | HBO | Producer / director | | |
| 1983 | Motown 25: Yesterday, Today, Forever | NBC | Producer / director | Primetime Emmy Award, Peabody Award, Director's Guild Award | |
| 1984 | Great Performances | PBS | Producer / director | Primetime Emmy Award, Director's Guild Award (with co Director Twayla Thwarp) | Episode: "Baryshnikov by Tharp" |
| 1985 | Motown Returns to The Apollo | NBC | Producer / director | Primetime Emmy Award, Emmy nomination, Director's Guild Award | |
| 1985 | Carnegie Hall: Grand Reopening | CBS | Producer | | |
| 1987 | 41st Tony Awards | CBS | Executive producer | Primetime Emmy Award | |
| 1988 | 42nd Tony Awards | CBS | Executive producer | Primetime Emmy nomination | |
| 1988 | Irving Berlin's 100th Birthday at Carnegie Hall | CBS | Executive producer | Primetime Emmy Award | |
| 1989 | 43rd Tony Awards | CBS | Executive producer | Primetime Emmy Award | |
| 1989 | Willie Nelson: Texas Style | CBS | Producer, director, writer | | |
| 1991 | Great Performances | PBS | Producer / director | Primetime Emmy Award, Directors Guild Award | Episode: "Gregory Hines: Tap Dance in America" |
| 1991 | Carnegie Hall: Live at 100 | PBS | Executive producer | Emmy nomination | |
| 1992 | Bob Hope: The First 90 Years | NBC | Producer | Emmy Award | |
| 1993 | Super Bowl XXVII halftime show | NBC | Producer / director | | First Super Bowl halftime show produced by Mischer; Headline artist: Michael Jackson; Produced in conjunction with Scott Sanders and Radio City Music Hall |
| 1996 | 1996 Summer Olympics opening ceremony | Various across the world | Producer / director | Emmy Award, Directors Guild Award | |
| 1998 | Muppets Celebrate Jim Henson | CBS | Producer / director | Emmy nomination | |
| 1998 | To Life: Israel's 50th Anniversary Celebration | ABC | Producer | | |
| 1998 | 50th Primetime Emmy Awards | NBC | Producer | | |
| 1999 | Sonny & Cher: Cher Remembers | CBS | Producer / director | | |
| 2000 | Barbra Streisand: Timeless | Fox | Producer / director | Directors Guild Award Nomination (with c/o director Barbra Streisand) | |
| 2002 | 2002 Winter Olympics opening ceremony | Various across the world | Executive producer | Academy of Television Arts and Sciences National Sports Emmy Award | |
| 2004 | 2004 Democratic National Convention | —N/a | Producer | | |
| 2004 | 56th Primetime Emmy Awards | ABC | Producer | | |
| 2005 | Super Bowl XXXIX halftime show | Fox | Producer / director | | Headline artist: Paul McCartney |
| 2006 | Super Bowl XL halftime show | ABC | Producer / director | | Headline artist: The Rolling Stones |
| 2007 | James Taylor: One Man Band | PBS | Producer / director | Emmy nomination | |
| 2007 | Super Bowl XLI halftime show | CBS | Producer / director | Emmy nomination | Headline artist: Prince; Additional appearance: Florida A&M University Marching 100 Band; Produced in conjunction with White Cherry Entertainment |
| 2007 | 2007 Special Olympics World Summer Games | —N/a | Producer | | |
| 2007 | Movies Rock | CBS | Executive producer / director | | |
| 2008 | Super Bowl XLII halftime show | Fox | Executive producer / director | | Headline artist: Tom Petty and the Heartbreakers; Produced in conjunction with White Cherry Entertainment |
| 2008 | Fashion Rocks | —N/a | Producer / Director | | |
| 2009 | We Are One: The Obama Inaugural Celebration at the Lincoln Memorial | HBO | Producer / director | Directors Guild Award | |
| 2009 | Super Bowl XLIII halftime show | NBC | Executive producer / director | Emmy nomination | Headline artist: Bruce Springsteen and the E Street Band; Additional appearance: The Miami Horns; Produced in conjunction with White Cherry Entertainment |
| 2009 | 61st Primetime Emmy Awards | CBS | Producer | | |
| 2010 | 62nd Primetime Emmy Awards | NBC | Producer | | |
| 2011–2013 | Billboard Music Awards | ABC | Executive producer | | |
| 2011 | 83rd Academy Awards | ABC | Producer / director | Emmy nomination | |
| 2012–2019 | The Breakthrough Prize | Fox; National Geographic | Producer / director | | |
| 2012 | 84th Academy Awards | ABC | Producer / director | Emmy nomination | |
| 2012 | One Night Only: Eddie Murphy | Spike | Producer / director | | |
| 2012 | 64th Primetime Emmy Awards | ABC | Producer | | |
| 2013 | 85th Academy Awards | ABC | Director | Emmy nomination | |
| 2014 | One Night Only: Don Rickles | Spike | Producer | | |
| 2014 | National September 11 Memorial & Museum dedication | —N/a | Producer / director | | |
| 2014 | 66th Primetime Emmy Awards | NBC | Producer | | |
| 2015 | 67th Primetime Emmy Awards | Fox | Producer | | |
| 2016 | Jazz at The White House | ABC | Producer / director | | |
| 2016 | Taking The Stage: African American Music and Stories that Changed America | ABC | Executive producer / writer | | |
| 2016 | 68th Primetime Emmy Awards | ABC | Producer | | |
| 2019 | 71st Primetime Emmy Awards | Fox | Executive producer | | |
