= Indigo Nights =

Live album by Prince
- Released: September 30, 2008 (21 Nights supplement)
- Recorded: Summer 2007
- Venue: indigO_{2} arena, London
- Genre: Pop; rock; funk
- Length: 77:00
- Label: NPG
- Producer: Prince

Prince chronology
Planet Earth (2007)	Indigo Nights (2008)	Lotusflow3r (2009)

Indigo Nights is a live album by Prince, mainly comprising songs played live during some of the aftershows at the indigO_{2} music venue in London in 2007. It contains nine live versions of previously released Prince songs, four cover songs, one new song and a monologue. The CD was only sold coupled with the 21 Nights coffee table book which was released on September 30, 2008. The book reached number 9 on The New York Times best selling hardcover nonfiction titles.

In 2018 the album was released digitally on music platforms Tidal, Spotify, iTunes Store and Apple Music by NPG Records.

== Track listing ==
No.	Title	Writer(s)	Length
1.	"3121 (Note: Contains interpolation of Scott Joplin's 1902 composition "The Entertainer" and "D.M.S.R.")"		7:44
2.	"Girls & Boys"		4:05
3.	"The Song of the Heart"		1:39
4.	"Delirious"		2:01
5.	"Just Like U" (monologue)		2:49
6.	"Satisfied"		6:19
7.	"Beggin' Woman Blues"	Prince; Joseph Pleasant	6:43
8.	"Rock Steady" (Aretha Franklin cover) (featuring Beverley Knight)	Aretha Franklin	6:37
9.	"Whole Lotta Love" (Led Zeppelin cover)	John Bonham; Willie Dixon; John Paul Jones; Jimmy Page; Robert Plant	4:42
10.	"Alphabet St."		6:09
11.	"Indigo Nights (Note: Contains an instrumental jam based on "Get on the Boat")"		3:41
12.	"Misty Blue" (Dorothy Moore cover) (featuring Shelby J.)	Bob Montgomery	4:25
13.	"Baby Love" (Mother's Finest cover) (featuring Shelby J.)	Jerry Seay	3:54
14.	"The One (Note: Features guitar solo from "The Question of U")"		9:08
15.	"All the Critics Love U in London (Note: Variation of "All the Critics Love U in New York")"		7:05
Total length:			77:00
