= Lotusflow3r =

2009 studio album by Prince

Box set by Prince
- Released: March 24, 2009
- Recorded: November 2004; Early 2005 – early 2009
- Genres: Pop; soul; rock; R&B; funk
- Length: 139:03
- Label: NPG
- Producer: Prince

Prince chronology
| Indigo Nights (2008) | Lotusflow3r (2009) | 20Ten (2010) |

Lotusflow3r is a triple album set by American recording artist Prince and protégée Bria Valente. It contains the thirty-third and thirty-fourth studio albums by Prince, Lotusflow3r (stylized as LOtUSFLOW3R) and MPLSound (stylized as MPLSoUND, pronounced Minneapolis Sound), as well as Elixer, the debut studio album by Bria Valente. It was released on March 24, 2009, by NPG Records. The three albums were sold exclusively in the United States at Target as a 3-disc set, and in Europe from more online music stores.

The album debuted at No. 2 on the US Billboard 200 chart, selling 168,000 copies in its first week. Along with the set's other albums, Lotusflow3r received generally mixed to positive reviews from music critics.

== Production ==
The album was recorded and mixed by Richard Furch.

== Release and promotion ==
In December 2008, four songs were premiered on Los Angeles radio station Indie 103: a cover of "Crimson and Clover", "4ever", "Colonized Mind" and "Wall of Berlin". A month later in a Los Angeles Times article, further song titles were mentioned, namely "Hey Valentina" (written for Salma Hayek's daughter), "Better with Time" (an ode to Under the Cherry Moon co-star Kristin Scott Thomas), "Love Like Jazz", "$" (about "the most popular girl in the whole wide world"), and "77 Beverly Park".

To generate excitement, Prince launched mplsound.com in December 2008, offering an instrumental of "(There'll Never B) Another Like Me", later replaced by the finished track. A month later, the site was shut down and replaced with an announcement of a new interactive website (lotusflow3r.com), proclaiming it would allow fans to "listen, watch and buy" music and videos featuring Prince and guest artists. The site, possibly acknowledging early reviews that the music hearkens back to his Purple Rain days (and the fact that 2009 marked its 25th anniversary), featured a thrown-down television set on a cliff with a frame from the movie. The site had three songs for listening: "Crimson and Clover", "Here Come", and "(There'll Never B) Another Like Me". A couple of weeks later, it was updated again with more interactive content. The site contained 60-second samples of three songs: "Chocolate Box", "Colonized Mind", and "All This Love". On January 31, more changes were made with a new instrumental available for listening, as well as a "teaser" video. The site also had three full songs for listening: "Colonized Mind", "Discojellyfish" (an instrumental non-album track based on "Chocolate Box"), and "Another Boy", which is sung by Bria Valente.

The album contains a few songs previously known by fans. "Feel Better, Feel Good, Feel Wonderful" was posted on Prince's now-defunct NPG Music Club website as a one-minute demo in 2006; "U're Gonna C Me" is a remake of a track from Prince's 2002 album One Nite Alone...; and "Kept Woman" is a track from Prince's unreleased 2006 project with Támar called Milk and Honey. Originally intended to be released together with Prince's 3121 album, the project was eventually leaked onto the internet by Támar on her website. "Here I Come" had been posted on Prince's now-defunct 3121.com site in 2007. An excerpt of the song "Home" was posted on drfunkenberry.com in 2008 and the track "Another Boy" was debuted on radio and iTunes in 2008.

On March 11, 2009, it was announced on Billboard.com that Prince would perform on The Tonight Show with Jay Leno three nights in a row, March 25–27. He performed "Ol' Skool Company", "Dreamer" and "Feel Better, Feel Good, Feel Wonderful". Prince also performed "Crimson and Clover" on The Ellen DeGeneres Show and along with Valente gave a two-part interview on the Tavis Smiley show in which he revealed he was born epileptic. During a fourth The Tonight Show appearance on May 28, in celebration of the end of Leno's first run as host of the show, Prince also performed "Somewhere Here on Earth" from his 2007 Planet Earth album.

On March 23, a demo of the song "Chocolate Box" (without Q-Tip) was leaked onto the internet. On March 24, at 7:07 pm PST, lotusflow3r.com opened officially. Members who joined early and paid the $77/year fee got to view streaming video (including the cover of Radiohead's "Creep" performed at the 2008 Coachella festival) and music videos for the tracks "Chocolate Box", "Crimson and Clover" and "Everytime", download all three albums (detailed below), were sent a "founding member" T-shirt and were able to buy tickets to future concerts Prince would be doing in the LA area, including The Tonight Show performances. Later in 2009, Prince performed two shows in Montreux during the Montreux Jazz Festival and released a re-recorded version of the 1986 outtake "In a Large Room with No Light" to promote the concerts. Later, Prince also performed three shows in Monaco. On October 14, Prince performed on the French television program Le Grand Journal on Canal + to promote Lotusflow3r after playing three concerts in Paris. He performed the songs "Dance 4 Me", "No More Candy 4 U", "1999" and "Controversy".

The album was released as a physical release a few days later as a Target exclusive for the price of US$11.98. Even though the album was only released in the US, many copies were exported for sale in Europe. Warner Music released the album in France on September 7, as a single CD (MPLSound) and a limited 3-CD set. "Dance 4 Me" was digitally released on August 31 as a single. Three remixes ("Icon Remix", "Tribal Drum Remix" and "Dominatrix Remix") of the song were later released on the independent "Purple Music" label in 2011. The "Icon Remix" was later released as a standalone single for a limited time on iTunes and a "making of" for the remix was posted on YouTube.

The song "Crimson and Clover" was replaced by the 2006 outtake "The Morning After" on the digital version of the album.

== Reception ==
Professional ratings
Aggregate scores
| Source | Rating |
|---|---|
| Metacritic | 68/100 |
Review scores
| Source | Rating |
| AllMusic | 3/5 stars |
| The A.V. Club | C+ |
| Entertainment Weekly | C− |
| The Guardian | 3/5 stars |
| Los Angeles Times | 2.5/4 stars |
| Pitchfork | 4.9/10 |
| PopMatters | 7/10 |
| Rolling Stone | 3/5 stars |
| Slant | 2.5/5 stars |
| USA Today | 3/4 stars |

The album debuted at number two on the US Billboard 200, selling 168,000 copies in its first week and becoming Prince's fourth consecutive top-three album in the United States. The album narrowly missed the number-one spot, selling 3,000 copies less than Keith Urban's Defying Gravity. As of February 1, 2012, the album has sold 543,700 units, according to SoundScan.

Upon their release, Lotusflow3r and MPLSound received generally mixed to positive reviews from most music critics, based on aggregate scores of 61 and 62/100 from Metacritic. Bria Valente's Elixer received generally mixed or average reviews from most music critics, receiving an aggregate score of 49/100 from Metacritic.

== Track listings ==
=== Lotusflow3r ===
Lotusflow3r

Studio album by Prince
- Recorded: November 2004; early 2005 – early 2009
- Genres: Psychedelic rock; psychedelic soul; funk rock; acid rock; pop rock
- Length: 48:40 (physical); 46:54 (digital)

All tracks are written by Prince, except where noted.

| No. | Title | Writer(s) | Length |
|---|---|---|---|
| 1. | "From the Lotus..." | | 2:46 |
| 2. | "Boom" | | 3:19 |
| 3. | "Crimson and Clover" | Tommy James, Peter Lucia, Jr. | 3:52 |
| 4. | "4ever" | | 3:47 |
| 5. | "Colonized Mind" | | 4:47 |
| 6. | "Feel Good, Feel Better, Feel Wonderful" | | 3:52 |
| 7. | "Love Like Jazz" | | 3:49 |
| 8. | "77 Beverly Park" | | 3:04 |
| 9. | "Wall of Berlin" | | 4:16 |
| 10. | "$" | | 3:58 |
| 11. | "Dreamer" | | 5:30 |
| 12. | "...Back 2 the Lotus" | | 5:34 |

"Crimson and Clover" includes an interpolation of Chip Taylor's "Wild Thing".

Digital edition
| No. | Title | Length |
|---|---|---|
| 3. | "The Morning After" | 2:06 |

=== MPLSound ===
MPLSound

Studio album by Prince
- Recorded: Early 2008 – early 2009 Chanhassen, Minnesota
- Genres: Funk; R&B; electronica; new wave; hip hop; experimental pop
- Length: 47:44

Singles from MPLSound
- 1. "Better with Time" Released: August 24, 2009 (radio play); 2. "Dance 4 Me" Released: September 26, 2009; 3. "U're Gonna C Me" Released: October, 2009 (non-US single)

All songs written by Prince.

| No. | Title | Length |
|---|---|---|
| 1. | "(There'll Never B) Another Like Me" | 6:01 |
| 2. | "Chocolate Box" (featuring Q-Tip) | 6:14 |
| 3. | "Dance 4 Me" | 4:58 |
| 4. | "U're Gonna C Me" | 4:36 |
| 5. | "Here" | 5:15 |
| 6. | "Valentina" | 3:59 |
| 7. | "Better with Time" | 4:54 |
| 8. | "Ol' Skool Company" | 7:30 |
| 9. | "No More Candy 4 U" | 4:14 |

=== Elixer ===
Elixer

Studio album by Bria Valente
- Genres: Pop; R&B; electronica; soul; smooth jazz
- Length: 44:25

Singles from Elixer
- 1. "Another Boy" Released: September 30, 2008

Professional ratings
Aggregate scores
| Source | Rating |
|---|---|
| Metacritic | 49/100 |
Review scores
| Source | Rating |
| AllMusic | 3/5 stars |
| The A.V. Club | C+ |
| Entertainment Weekly | C− |
| Los Angeles Times | 2/4 stars |
| The Observer | 3/5 stars |
| Pitchfork | 3.2/10 |
| Rolling Stone | 2/5 stars |
| Vibe | 2/5 stars |

All songs written by Prince and Bria Valente, except "Kept Woman" written solely by Prince. All tracks sung by Bria Valente.

| No. | Title | Length |
|---|---|---|
| 1. | "Here Come" | 4:28 |
| 2. | "All This Love" | 4:39 |
| 3. | "Home" | 4:26 |
| 4. | "Something U Already Know" | 5:44 |
| 5. | "Everytime" | 3:50 |
| 6. | "2nite" | 5:02 |
| 7. | "Another Boy" | 3:56 |
| 8. | "Kept Woman" | 4:15 |
| 9. | "Immersion" | 4:02 |
| 10. | "Elixer" (with Prince) | 4:00 |

== Charts ==
=== Weekly charts ===
Weekly chart performance for Lotusflow3r
| Chart (2009) | Peak position |
|---|---|
| Belgian Albums (Ultratop Flanders) | 44 |
| Belgian Albums (Ultratop Wallonia) | 78 |
| Dutch Albums (Album Top 100) | 23 |
| French Albums (SNEP) | 14 |
| Italian Albums (FIMI) | 65 |
| UK Independent Albums (Official Charts) | 30 |
| US Billboard 200 | 2 |
| US Independent Albums (Billboard) | 1 |
| US Top R&B/Hip-Hop Albums (Billboard) | 1 |

=== Year-end charts ===
Year-end chart performance for Lotusflow3r
| Chart (2009) | Position |
|---|---|
| French Albums (SNEP) | 166 |
| US Billboard 200 | 85 |
| US Independent Albums (Billboard) | 2 |
| US Top R&B/Hip-Hop Albums (Billboard) | 29 |
