= Purple Music Switzerland =

Swiss record label

- Type: Private
- Industry: Record Label
- Genre: House
- Founded: 1997
- Headquarters: Zurich, Switzerland
- Key people: Jamie Lewis
- Website: www.purplemusic.ch

Purple Music Switzerland is a Swiss record label, based in Zürich and owned by DJ, producer and a former record shop owner Cem Berter aka Jamie Lewis. Purple Music is regarded as one of the most influential house music labels of the 00s.

The label was created in 1997 with the intention to fuse Gospel with house music. The label has had a monthly residency party at Kaufleuten club in Zurich since 1997. Jamie Lewis has been nominated twice for the House Music Awards in the UK.

Artists currently signed to the label include Dario D'Attis, Souldynamic, Roberto De Carlo, Kemal, Anthony Romeno and more. Over the past 10 years the label has also featured Kings of Tomorrow, Sandy Rivera, Bob Sinclar and Dimitri From Paris. Most of the releases on Purple Music have a strong vocal presence, with vocalists such as Jocelyn Brown, Michelle Weeks, Lisa Millett, Inaya Day and Michael Watford all having appeared on a number of tracks. In 2000s Purple Music released a series of highly successful remixes of Cerrone, with the most notable being "Hooked On You" and "You Are The One". Affiliated labels include Purple Tracks and Indeependent.

== See also ==
- List of record labels
- List of house music artists
