= Re-recording =

Re-recording may refer to:

- Re-recording (filmmaking), the process with which the audio track of a film or video production is created
- Re-recording (video gaming), the act of using a save state while recording a tool-assisted speedrun
- Re-recording (music), where a music artist or group re-records an already published song
