= I Am (Elisa Fiorillo album) =

Studio album by Elisa Fiorillo
- Released: 21 August 1990
- Studio: Paisley Park, Chanhassen, Minnesota
- Genre: R&B, dance-pop, house
- Length: 44:00
- Label: Chrysalis
- Producer: David Z; Prince; Oliver Leiber

Elisa Fiorillo chronology
| Elisa Fiorillo (1987) | I Am (1990) | Nursery Rhymes (1996) |

Professional ratings
Review scores
| Source | Rating |
|---|---|
| AllMusic | 2/5 stars |
| News & Record | 3/5 stars |
| New Straits Times | 2/5 stars |

I Am is the second album from American singer Elisa Fiorillo, released by Chrysalis in 1990.

It was not a commercial success when released in 1990. Its two singles were more successful, however, particularly the lead single "On the Way Up," which reached number 27 on the U.S. Billboard Hot 100. The second single "Oooh This I Need" was released in 1991, and reached number 90 on that chart.

== Background ==
Elisa Fiorillo recorded I Am at Prince's Paisley Park recording studio, with David Z producing the majority of the album. Fiorillo originally approached David Z and expressed her interest in recording at Paisley Park. She recalled in 1991, "I wanted to take the Philadelphia soul sound and add it to the Minneapolis funk and make myself a really soulful little white girl." Speaking of the result, she stated in another interview, "I went in with a different attitude and I came out with what I wanted. [The record company] didn't want me to sing R&B because they didn't have a department for that kind of music. I said, 'I don't care, that's what I want, that's what I sing. I'm going to make the record anyway—you guys are gonna have to get an R&B department.'"

Prince contributed to I Am by writing three of the songs, co-writing an additional two, and producing one. In an interview at the time, Fiorillo said of her collaboration with Prince on the album, "I was at Paisley Park Studios working on my second album. I had just finished some vocals. I went to the bathroom, came back, and Prince was sitting there in the studio listening to my tape. He looked up and said, 'You're a good singer. Why don't you go in there and sing for me?' I was always taught to be confident. So I went in and started singing. I didn't know it at the time, but [he] had been writing a song called 'I Am' for me. And he was always on my case, urging me to write more. He said, 'Tomorrow I want you to bring in a new set of lyrics and we'll write a song.' I stayed up until 4 a.m. writing. He was extremely nice, and completely respectful."

== Song information ==
"Playgirl" features a rap by Fiorillo.

"Ain't Right" addresses interracial relationships. Fiorillo stated, "I got the idea from a friend of mine who was going out with a black guy. 'Ain't Right' is about the way her parents reacted. If a person loves somebody you shouldn't put any boundaries on it. I mean, I'm Italian; I don't want people saying, 'Don't go out with her, she eats too much pasta.'"

"Purpose in Your Life," which addresses teenage suicide, was inspired by a letter Fiorillo received several years earlier from a despondent 13-year-old fan. Fiorillo stated, "I wrote her a letter back, and I told her, 'You have to have a purpose, and you should realize that you can't live for everyone else—you have to live for yourself.' She wrote me back, and so did her parents, thanking me. It made me think I can really help people and it's nobody's doing but mine." "Love's No Fun" was covered by Mayte on her only album Child of the Sun (1995).

== Track listing ==
| No. | Title | Writer(s) | Length |
|---|---|---|---|
| 1. | "I Am" | David Z., Levi Seacer Jr., Prince | 4:57 |
| 2. | "On the Way Up" | David Z., Elisa Fiorillo, Seacer Jr., Prince | 4:20 |
| 3. | "Out of My Mind" | Bill Kenner, Micheal Smotherman, Tom Flora | 4:34 |
| 4. | "Playgirl" | Prince | 4:21 |
| 5. | "Love's No Fun" | Prince | 3:50 |
| 6. | "Oooh This I Need" | Prince | 4:00 |
| 7. | "Ain't Right" | Fiorillo, Oliver Leiber | 4:39 |
| 8. | "Something So Strong" | Fiorillo, Ian Prince | 5:04 |
| 9. | "Don't Change" | Darryl Duncan, Fiorillo | 4:08 |
| 10. | "Purpose in Your Life" | David Z., Fiorillo, Seacer Jr. | 4:07 |

== Personnel ==
- Elisa Fiorillo - vocals, writer (track 2, 7, 8, 9, 10)
- David Z. - producer (tracks 1–5 and 8–10), drums (track 1, 3), percussion (tracks 1, 2, 3, 5, 10), writer (track 1, 2, 10), recorded by (track 5), all instruments (track 8)
- Levi Seacer Jr. - all instruments (track 1, 2, 8, 10), writer (track 1, 2, 10), co-producer (track 2, 8, 10), drums (track 3), percussion (track 3), other instruments (track 3), bass (track 6), guitar (track 9)
- Prince - writer (track 1, 2, 4, 5, 6), other instruments (track 5), producer (track 6)
- Bill Kenner - writer (track 3)
- Michael Smotherman - writer (track 3)
- Tom Flora - writer (track 3)
- Cynthia Johnson - backing vocals (track 4)
- Ingrid Chavez - backing vocals (track 4)
- Jana Anderson - backing vocals (track 4)
- Rosie Gaines - backing vocals (track 4, 6)
- Michael Koppelman - recorded by (track 4, 5, 6), harpsichord (track 6)
- Junior Vasquez - remix (track 4)
- The Steeles - backing vocals (track 5, 7)
- Sonny Thompson - bass (track 5)
- Michael Bland - drums (track 5)
- Michael Bland - acoustic drums (track 6)
- Kirk Johnson - electric drums (track 6)
- The Wild Pair - backing vocals (track 7)
- St. Paul - electric bass (track 7), organ (track 7)
- Oliver Leiber - drums (track 7), producer (track 7), writer (track 7)
- Keith Cohen - mixer (track 7)
- Ian Prince - co-producer (track 8), all instruments (track 8), writer (track 8)
- Darryl Duncan - co-producer (track 9), all instruments (track 9), writer (track 9)

== Charts ==
=== Singles ===
"On the Way Up"

| Chart (1990) | Peak position |
|---|---|
| Australian Singles Chart | 19 |
| UK Singles Chart | 83 |
| US Billboard Hot 100 | 27 |
| US Billboard Dance/Club Play | 31 |

"Oooh This I Need"

| Chart (1991) | Peak position |
|---|---|
| US Billboard Hot 100 | 90 |
