= Black Sweat =

2006 single by Prince

Single by Prince

from the album 3121
- B-side: "Beautiful, Loved and Blessed"
- Released: February 7, 2006
- Recorded: 2004–2005
- Studio: Paisley Park, Chanhassen, Minnesota, US
- Genre: Funk; minimalist; electro-funk
- Label: NPG; Universal; Unique (UK release)
- Songwriter: Prince
- Producer: Prince

Prince singles chronology
"Te Amo Corazón" (2005)	"Black Sweat" (2006)	"Fury" (2006)

"Black Sweat" is a song by American musician Prince, released as the second single from his 2006 album, 3121. The music video to accompany the single was released on February 2, 2006. At the 49th Annual Grammy Awards, it was nominated for Best R&B Song and Best Male R&B Vocal Performance.

== Music video ==
The video was filmed at Prince's rental home in Los Angeles on January 21, 2006. It is presented in black and white. It features dancer Celestina Aladekoba and was directed by Sanaa Hamri.

== Official versions ==
- Original
- Video version
- TSMV edit by Tommie Sunshine

== Chart performance ==
For the week ending March 11, 2006, "Black Sweat" debuted on the Billboard Hot 100 at number 60 (Prince's highest debut since "The Greatest Romance Ever Sold" in 1999), and at number 83 on the Hot R&B/Hip-Hop Singles and Tracks chart. It also debuted at number one on Billboard's Hot 100 Singles Sales chart, which tabulates physical sales.

The song's initial surge of 11,500 digital singles sales was prompted by a month-long promotion with iTunes, in which four consumers would win a private concert performance by Prince. "Black Sweat" was bundled with a second track from 3121, Beautiful, Loved and Blessed (duet with Támar. This promotional tactic propelled the song's lofty Hot 100 debut. As is typical with songs whose chart position is predominantly attributed to initial sales (with little or no radio airplay), "Black Sweat" dropped off the Hot 100 the following week.

"Black Sweat" debuted at number two on the Canadian Singles Chart for sales. The track was released on March 27, 2006 in the UK, and charted relatively low at number 43 on the UK Singles Chart, marking his last top 40 hit on the chart before his death in 2016, meaning Prince did not have a top 40 hit since the re-release of "1999" in the year 1998 during his lifetime. In Italy the single peaked at number 24.

Overall, "Black Sweat" appeared on the pop charts in a number of countries in 2006, including the US, and went Top 40 on the charts in Greece, Italy, Latvia, Netherlands, and Spain. In addition, the song was a hit on Japanese radio, staying at high rotation for several weeks on stations throughout the country.

== Charts ==
Weekly chart performance for "Black Sweat"
Chart (2006)	Peak position
Belgium (Ultratip Bubbling Under Flanders)	14
Germany (GfK)	80
Italy (FIMI)	24
Netherlands (Dutch Top 40 Tipparade)	2
Netherlands (Single Top 100)	29
Scottish Singles Sales (Official Charts)	40
Spain (Promusicae)	17
Switzerland (Schweizer Hitparade)	52
UK Singles (Official Charts)	43
UK Hip Hop/R&B (Official Charts)	6
US Billboard Hot 100	60
US Adult R&B Songs (Billboard)	25
US Hot R&B/Hip-Hop Songs (Billboard)	82
