= Liv Warfield =

- Born: Olivia Warfield; Peoria, Illinois, U.S.
- Genres: R&B, soul, alternative
- Occupations: Singer, songwriter
- Instrument: Vocals
- Years active: 2006–present
- Labels: Livalittle Music, LLC; Kobalt
- Formerly of: Blackbird; New Power Generation; Roadcase Royale
- Website: livwarfieldofficial.com

Olivia "Liv" Warfield is an American R&B singer-songwriter from Peoria, Illinois. She was part of Prince's New Power Generation and, as of 2016, is with Roadcase Royale, a band formed with Nancy Wilson and members of Heart.

== Personal life and career ==
Warfield grew up the daughter of a Pentecostal deacon listening to gospel music, with a strict background which did not allow her to listen to secular music; she used to sing Whitney Houston songs to herself when her parents were not around. She graduated from Peoria Notre Dame High School in Peoria in 1997. She later moved from Peoria to go to college in Portland, Oregon on a track scholarship at Portland State University. Her interest in public singing started at a karaoke club, but she was so nervous on her first try that she sang with her back facing the audience. Eventually, she became obsessed with performing to the point that she would attend daily and progressed to wearing wigs and costumes. At another establishment, she watched Linda Hornbuckle who brought her onstage to sing, and again, due to nervousness, Warfield sang with her back to the crowd. When she decided to pursue singing as a career, she dropped out of school and slept in her car. Her mother was initially upset to discover Liv was singing and wanted to bring her back home, but eventually changed her mind and became supportive. In 2006, Liv Warfield self-released her first album Embrace Me–a collection of strong ballads. She did performances and sold her CDs at a local market.

=== With Prince ===
Warfield's music career took off in 2009 after being selected as the newest member of Prince's New Power Generation two months after he took interest in a submitted video of her performing The Rolling Stones' "Gimme Shelter", and she subsequently auditioned for him. He mentored her, helping hone her stage presence and studio arrangement of her music. She toured with the band for five years. Warfield is featured on his album Lotusflow3r. Her second solo album, The Unexpected was released early 2014 with Prince as its Executive Producer and the New Power Generation providing horns; Prince also wrote the single under the same name for the album. After Prince died, Warfield performed at Celebration 2017, a multi-day tribute to his life and legacy held a year after his death, at Paisley Park. She said "I, personally, have a hard time dealing with loss. But this time for me, I felt at peace. I felt peaceful. That was my hope. That was my intention—please let us see the light, despite all this other stuff going on."

=== Roadcase Royale ===
In 2015, Warfield was chosen to be the opening act for Heart's Hollywood Bowl concert after Nancy Wilson had seen her on The Tonight Show Starring Jimmy Fallon and was impressed with her performance of "Why Do You Lie?". As a fan of the band's work, Warfield was excited to meet them and after the end of the show, she met up with Nancy Wilson. Wilson expressed an interest in Warfield's sound and later the women bonded over different songs they tried out together.

The duo teamed up to form a new group called Roadcase Royale in 2016. Its style is rock, R&B and ballads reflecting the sounds of both their respective bands. Lead guitarist Ryan Waters (the musical director for Warfield's solo work and Prince protégé), Heart keyboardist Chris Joyner, bassist Dan Rothchild, and drummer Ben Smith complete the band's membership. They released their first single, "Get Loud", in January 2017 and signed with Loud and Proud Records in July 2017. Their debut full-length album, First Things First, was released on September 22, 2017. The band was scheduled to open for Bob Seger on his 2017 Runaway Train tour for a number of appearances, but due to Seger's medical issues the original tour was canceled. The postponed shows will again feature Roadcase Royale as the opening act on select dates.

=== America's Got Talent ===
Liv Warfield auditioned for season 19 of America's Got Talent, receiving the Golden Buzzer from Simon Cowell.

== Awards and recognition ==
VH1 Soul featured Warfield as a Soul You Oughta Know artist in early 2014. Warfield received a Soul Train Music Awards nomination in 2014 for Best New Artist and won for Stay – "Soul Lifted" from The Unexpected in the Best Contemporary Jazz Performance category. Also in 2014, her home town of Peoria held a fundraising dinner reception and meet and greet with Warfield in conjunction with the Living to Serve Foundation, Inc. and The XFactor Agency to promote women's health and the George Washington Carver Center for youth. May 10 was declared "Liv Warfield Day" by Mayor Jim Ardis. On April 14, 2026, Warfield was honored with the dedication of "Liv Warfield Way" at the corner of Missouri Avenue and War Memorial Drive in Peoria.

== Discography ==
- Embrace Me (2006)
1. ABC's Featuring Bernard Pretty Purdie
2. Embrace Me
3. Sophisticated Sista
4. I Decided
5. Groove DJ
6. Waiting
7. Work For Me
8. Get Away
9. Feeling Lonely
10. Time
11. Brotha Man-Live
- The Unexpected (2014)
1. Coat of Arms
2. The Unexpected
3. Why Do You Lie?
4. Blackbird
5. Stay – "Soul Lifted"
6. Catch Me If You Can
7. Don't Say Much
8. Lena Blue
9. Freedom
10. Come Back
11. Your Show
12. Fanfare
13. Fly
