= Te Amo Corazón =

2005 single by Prince

- US CD single

Single by Prince

from the album 3121
- Released: December 13, 2005
- Recorded: 2005
- Studio: Paisley Park, Chanhassen, Minnesota, US
- Genre: Smooth jazz
- Length: 3:37
- Label: NPG
- Songwriter: Prince
- Producer: Prince

Prince singles chronology
| "S.S.T." (2005) | "Te Amo Corazón" (2005) | "Black Sweat" (2006) |

"Te Amo Corazón" is a song by American musician Prince, released as the first single from his 2006 album, 3121. It was officially released by the NPG Music Club on December 13, 2005. The song was a top 25 hit in multiple European countries, peaking as high as number two in Spain and number seven in Italy.

The song, whose title roughly translates as "I love you, sweetheart" in Spanish, was influenced by Brazilian bossa nova, as also shown in the music video. The video, filmed on location in Marrakesh, was directed by Salma Hayek and starred Prince and Mía Maestro . The song charted on three different Billboard music charts in the US in early 2006, first peaking at position 4 on the Hot R&B/Hip-Hop Singles Sales chart that January, then peaking at position 27 on the Smooth Jazz Airplay chart that February, and finally peaking at position 67 on the Hot R&B/Hip-Hop Songs chart that March.

It was later covered by Viktoria Tolstoy on her album Pictures of Me, along with another Prince song, "Strollin'".

== Charts ==
Weekly chart performance for "Te Amo Corazón"
| Chart (2005–06) | Peak position |
|---|---|
| Austria (Ö3 Austria Top 40) | 61 |
| Canada (Nielsen SoundScan) | 7 |
| Denmark (Tracklisten) | 14 |
| Germany (Official German Charts) | 58 |
| Italy (FIMI) | 7 |
| Norway (VG-lista) | 11 |
| Spain (PROMUSICAE) | 2 |
| Sweden (Sverigetopplistan) | 37 |
| Switzerland (Schweizer Hitparade) | 24 |
| US Hot R&B/Hip-Hop Songs (Billboard) | 67 |
