= Oooh This I Need =

Single by Elisa Fiorillo

from the album I Am
- B-side: "Purpose in Your Life"
- Released: 1991
- Genre: Pop, house
- Length: 4:00
- Label: Chrysalis Records
- Songwriter: Prince
- Producer: Prince

Elisa Fiorillo singles chronology
"On the Way Up" (1990)	"Oooh This I Need" (1991)

"Oooh This I Need" is a song recorded by American singer Elisa Fiorillo, released in 1991 as the second single from her second studio album, I Am (1990). It was written and produced by Prince, who wrote four other tracks on the album, as well.

== Background ==
Released as the follow-up single to Fiorillo's 1990 hit "On the Way Up," which had peaked at No. 27 on the U.S. Billboard Hot 100, "Oooh This I Need" failed to replicate the lead single's success. It peaked at No. 90 on the U.S. Billboard Hot 100 around March 1991, remaining on the chart for a total of 4 weeks.

In radio-industry magazine Network Forty, it peaked at No. 33 on their "CD TuneUp" chart, while also receiving a positive review.

In the March 8, 1991, issue of The Chicago Tribune, the song was mentioned in its "Take 2" section, a Friday guide to movies and music. It was included in a section listing "Ten must-play records for an evening on the dance floor nominated by Joe Smooth, deejay at The Warehouse."

== Release ==
The single was released in the U.S. only, on 12" vinyl, CD, and cassette.

The promotional-only one-track CD featured the A-side track only, while the cassette featured the album version, along with the album track "Purpose in Your Life" as the B-side.

The 12" vinyl release was promotional only, and aimed at the dance market. Two remixes were created by New Jersey–based duo Blaze, the A-side "Oooh This I Need (Below the Ground Mix)" and the B-side "Oooh This I Need (Laid Back Mix)", and was pressed in red vinyl.

Both the cassette and CD releases featured similar artwork, using the same photo of Fiorillo, while the cassette cover used a black background, and the CD insert used a white background. The 12" vinyl release featured no artwork but a basic sticker in the top right corner labeling the artist and the single title.

== Promotion ==
Unlike "On the Way Up," no music video was created for the single, however the song was performed on national TV. It was mimed on the half-hour late-night American musical variety show The Party Machine with Nia Peeples. It was also performed along with the album track "Love's No Fun" on the American variety/talk program The Arsenio Hall Show, which aired late weeknights. This performance featured both live instrumentation and vocal, where both songs were shortened and segued into one four-minute performance. It was also performed on the American syndicated music program Showtime at the Apollo, featuring live instrumentation and vocal, and also using the same two backing female dancers/vocalists as on "The Arsenio Hall Show."

In Hits magazine, a full A4-sized promotional poster was released in a February 1991 issue, utilizing the same image of Fiorillo as featured on the single's artwork.

== Track listing ==
Cassette Single

1. "Oooh This I Need" – 4:00
2. "Purpose in Your Life" – 4:07

CD Single (U.S. promo)

1. "Oooh This I Need" – 4:00

12" Vinyl Single (U.S. promo)

1. "Oooh This I Need (Below The Ground Mix)" – 6:09
2. "Oooh This I Need (Laid Back Mix)" – 4:09

== Critical reception ==
In radio-industry magazine Network Forty, a review of the single appeared in their "N40 Music Meeting" section, where it peaked at #33 on their "CD TuneUp" chart. The review stated, "Now 21, Elisa Fiorillo has definitely shed any trace of her younger past. Turning up the steam with producer David Z of the Prince camp in Minneapolis, Fiorillo projects a genuine voice and style well beyond her years. Reminiscent of Sheena Easton's recent comeback via her string of successful Prince duets, the mix of erotic production with this Pop voice is quite intriguing. Keeping the eclectic mix going is a catchy Pop hook, thrown an occasional curve by some very arty guitar work. It sounds like once this package gets going, it will be impossible to stop."

On February 10, 1991, a review of the I Am album by the Pittsburgh Post-Gazette said of the song, "Fiorillo gives a sultry, steamy turn to the dreamy "Oooh, This I Need," and "Love's No Fun.""

In a December 9, 1990, review of I Am by the New Straits Times, the song was described, along with four other album tracks, as "very Prince-ly indeed," and that on an overall album note, "Fiorillo's singing has enough thrust to cut it most of the time."

== Chart performance ==
Chart (1991)	Peak position
U.S. Billboard Hot 100	90

== Personnel ==
=== Oooh This I Need ===
- Elisa Fiorillo – vocals
- Levi Seacer Jr. – bass
- Prince – songwriter, producer
- Michael Koppelman – recorded by, mixer, harpsichord
- Rosie Gaines – backing vocals
- Michael Bland – acoustic drums
- Kirk Johnson – electric drums
- Blaze – 12" Vinyl Remixes

=== Purpose in Your Life ===
- Elisa Fiorillo – vocals, songwriter
- David Z. – producer, percussionist, recorded by, mixer, songwriter
- Levi Seacer Jr. – all instruments, songwriter, co-producer
