= Morris Hayes =

American keyboardist and musical director (born 1962)

- Also known as: Mr. Hayes
- Born: Morris Kevin Hayes; November 28, 1962 (age 63); Jefferson, Arkansas, U.S.
- Genres: Funk; R&B; soul
- Occupation: Musician
- Instruments: Keyboards; piano; organ; synthesizer
- Website: morrishayes.com

Morris Kevin Hayes (born November 28, 1962) is an American keyboardist, songwriter, musical director and producer best known for being one of the longest-tenured collaborators of Prince. He has also worked with musicians including Stevie Wonder, Elton John, Whitney Houston, and Maceo Parker. Hayes is a 2013 inductee of the Arkansas Black Hall of Fame, and performed as the keyboardist and musical director of the Super Bowl XLI halftime show. (Note: Attributed to the following sources:)

== Early career ==
=== Musical start ===
Hayes was born in Jefferson, Arkansas, and began playing music in church. After high school, Hayes attended the University of Arkansas at Pine Bluff, during which he began playing keyboards with local bands. Subsequently, Hayes moved to Chicago, Memphis, Tennessee, and Austin, Texas, playing in bands in each city before eventually being discovered by Brownmark and moving to Minneapolis.

=== Arrival in Minneapolis ===
Upon arriving in arriving in Minneapolis, Hayes initially joined Brownmark's band Mazarati, and began his songwriting and production work by working on tracks for Shanice's then-nascent career. After this, he joined the Time for a tour when the departure of Jimmy Jam and Terry Lewis left the band short of a keyboard player. After the tour, Hayes cofounded a band called G Sharp and The Edge, which became the house band for Prince's nightclub Glam Slam, bringing him to the attention of Prince.

== Work with Prince ==
Prince initially asked Morris Hayes to join the band backing Carmen Electra, who was then the opening act on the Diamonds and Pearls Tour. After the tour, Hayes was formally asked to join the New Power Generation band as keyboard player. During his first years with the band, Hayes was often credited or mentioned onstage as "Mr. Hayes" by Prince.

Hayes would be a core part of the band both on tour as musical director and in the studio on albums including Come (album), The Gold Experience, Chaos and Disorder, Emancipation (Prince album), Crystal Ball (box set), The Vault: Old Friends 4 Sale, Rave Un2 the Joy Fantastic, The Chocolate Invasion, The Slaughterhouse, Planet Earth (Prince album), Indigo Nights and Lotusflow3r. Hayes also appears on the Welcome 2 America album, where he co-produced half of the songs, and which he was responsible for compiling into a posthumous release after Prince's death.

During his time with Prince, Hayes toured almost constantly, acting as musical director for most of the duration, with responsibilities including performing on keyboards and synthesizers, triggering live samples, and handling arrangements as needed. The New Power Generation band also released multiple albums under their own name, as well as performing as the backing band for many songs released by other artists or under Prince's other pseudonyms. Prince's tours of this era also regularly featured guest musicians and singers, including Amy Winehouse, Chaka Khan, Questlove, Carlos Santana, Lenny Kravitz and many more.

After leaving to perform with other artists like Maceo Parker, Hayes returned in later years for additional stints in Prince's subsequent incarnations of the New Power Generation band, most notably in 2007 when Prince played the Super Bowl XLI halftime show to an audience of 140 million viewers.

== Recent career ==
After his first decade with Prince, Hayes left to join Maceo Parker's band, touring with Parker for several years. Hayes produced the memorial tribute concert to Prince after his passing, and continues to perform with members of the New Power Generation band. Through his music production company Ill Street, Hayes has composed for multiple films and television shows, including the Martin Lawrence production You So Crazy, According to Matthew, and Laurel Avenue.

In addition to his musical work, Hayes' philanthropic work has supported No Worries Now, an organization focused on helping children with terminal illnesses.
