= Guitar (song) =

Single by Prince

from the album Planet Earth
- B-side: "Somewhere Here On Earth"
- Released: July 9, 2007
- Recorded: Early 2007
- Studio: Paisley Park, Chanhassen, Minnesota, US
- Genre: Rock; funk rock; glam rock; hard rock; post-punk revival
- Length: 3:45
- Label: NPG; Columbia
- Songwriter: Prince
- Producer: Prince

Prince singles chronology
"Fury" (2006)	"Guitar" (2007)	"F.U.N.K." (2007)

"Guitar" is the first single from Prince's 2007 album Planet Earth. This song was number 39 on Rolling Stone's list of the 100 Best Songs of 2007.

The digital single was released in MP3 format through a partnership with Verizon Wireless, and O2. The music video for the song, featuring his current dancers "The Twinz" premiered on the Verizon website. It was directed by Milos Twilight, and produced by Prince and Milos Twilight, through Umania Digital Studios and Twilight Films.

The song was released to radio stations on June 11, while the CD single format was released worldwide on July 9.

Although not as successful on the charts as many of his other songs, "Guitar" entered the Top 40 of the singles charts in four countries: Greece, Italy, the Netherlands, and Japan, where it peaked at number 10 on the singles chart.

== Track listing ==
- 3121.com download:
1. "Guitar" (demo)
- Verizon download:
1. "Guitar" (album version)
- Worldwide download
1. "Guitar"
- CD single:
1. "Guitar" (album version)
2. "Somewhere Here on Earth" (album version)

== Charts ==
Chart performance for "Guitar"
Chart (2007)	Peak position
Belgium (Ultratip Bubbling Under Flanders)	23
France (SNEP)	200
Italy (FIMI)	17
Netherlands (Dutch Top 40)	21
Netherlands (Single Top 100)	13
Switzerland (Schweizer Hitparade)	63
UK Singles (OCC)	81
