= Elisa Fiorillo =

American singer (born 1969)

- Also known as: Elisa Dease
- Born: Elisa Fiorillo; February 28, 1969 (age 57); Philadelphia, Pennsylvania, U.S.
- Genres: Funk, soul, pop, rock
- Occupation: Singer
- Instrument: Vocals
- Years active: 1987–present
- Labels: Chrysalis Records/Paisley Park/Warner Bros., NPG Records

Elisa Fiorillo (born February 28, 1969, Philadelphia) is an American singer, best known for appearing on the 1987 Jellybean song "Who Found Who", which reached number 10 on the UK Singles Chart.

== Personal life ==
Fiorillo was born into a musical family, one of four children; her father Alexander Fiorillo, a classical pianist, studied with Vladimir Horowitz. She is of German, Italian, Irish, and Cherokee descent. She was married to Michael Dease and has one daughter named Olivia. Her husband died in late May 2019. She remarried in 2021 to Carlos Elorza.

== Career ==
At the age of 15, Fiorillo won the 1985 Star Search talent show. In 1987, she was signed to Chrysalis Records. She first performed the song "Jackie" on the Summer School soundtrack and caught the eye of John "Jellybean" Benitez who asked her to be the lead vocalist on two songs on his 1987 album Just Visiting This Planet. One of the songs, "Who Found Who", was a hit worldwide reaching the top 20 in many countries in addition to being a great club success. At the same time, Fiorillo released her self-titled debut album that she promoted with the help of the pop single "How Can I Forget You"; this did not achieve the same success.

She released her second album I Am in 1990 recorded at Prince's Paisley Park recording studio after she had contributed, as a backing vocalist, to the soundtracks of Graffiti Bridge and Batman. Several songs from the album were produced and written by Prince. The album included the single "On the Way Up", which was a top 30 hit in the U.S. and top 20 in Australia. She also appeared on Prince's album Diamonds and Pearls being the backing vocalist on two songs.

Throughout the 1990s, she mainly worked as a backing singer. She sang back-up for Savage Garden on the Superstars and Cannonballs tour and for Billie Myers among others. As a lead singer, she has appeared on Metal Gear Solid 3: Snake Eater, singing "Don't Be Afraid". She also did a duet with Savage Garden frontman Darren Hayes titled "Right Dead Back On It". Prince performed for three consecutive nights, March 25–27, 2009 on the Tonight Show with Jay Leno, and Fiorillo performed as one of Prince's backing vocalists on two of those shows. She became a member of Prince's band, The New Power Generation (NPG) in 2009, and in 2010 embarked on a world tour with Prince, playing in sold-out shows across Europe. She continued to work with Prince until his death in 2016.

However, she has continued to release her own music, including her 2007 album entitled Labour of Love. She turned to her musical direction towards jazz in the 2000s. Using her married name Dease, Fiorillo partnered with Nashville-based guitarist Tyler Reese in 2013 to form an independent musical duo called The Dease & Reese Project. Their debut album, Life in 20, was produced by Jeff Silverman, who had previously produced and performed with Rick Springfield. The album was released in June, 2014, on the REMU Records label. It is composed of 12 original songs inspired by Fiorillo’s life experiences, addressing subjects including faith, self-awareness, food addiction, domestic violence and motherhood. All Over the World is the first single from the album to be released to radio.

As well as singing, Fiorillo also directed a few TV series, such as the 2001 Mahô shôjo neko Taruto as well as the 2002 TV series Mao Dante. She voiced the (English) parts of Ayamo Nakamura in the 2003 TV series Stratos 4.

Elisa joined the board and faculty of PurplePlayground.org in 2020 - She teaches teen students how to write and record their own original songs at Academy of Prince.

== Discography ==
=== Albums ===
- 1987: Elisa Fiorillo
- 1990: I Am
- 1996: Nursery Rhymes
- 2001: Undecided
- 2002: Teach Me Tonight
- 2006: Labor of Love
- 2007: Light That Shines
- 2010: Songs from the Fiorillo & Esposito Catalog
- 2014: Life in 20 (as the Dease & Reese Project)

=== Singles ===
Year	Song	Peak chart positions				Album
Year	Song	US Hot 100	US Dance	AUS	UK	Album
1987	"Who Found Who" (Jellybean feat. Elisa Fiorillo)	16	3	70	10	Just Visiting This Planet
1987	"Little Too Good to Me" (with Jellybean)	–	–	–	–	Just Visiting This Planet and Elisa Fiorillo
1987	"How Can I Forget You"	60	47	–	50	Elisa Fiorillo
1987	"You Don't Know"	–	50	–	–	Elisa Fiorillo
1988	"Forgive Me for Dreaming"	49	–	–	83	Elisa Fiorillo
1988	"Do Something Foolish"	–	–	–	–	Elisa Fiorillo
1988	"High Bright Night" (Japan only)	–	–	–	–	Non-album single
1990	"On the Way Up"	27	31	19	83	I Am
1991	"Oooh This I Need"	90	–	–	–	I Am
2014	"All Over the World"	–	–	–	–	Life in 20
"–" denotes releases that did not chart or were not released in that territory.
