= Planet Earth (Prince album) =

Studio album by Prince
- Released: July 15, 2007
- Recorded: November 2004 – early 2007
- Genres: R&B; pop; funk; rock
- Length: 45:00
- Labels: NPG, Columbia
- Producer: Prince

Prince chronology
Ultimate Prince (2006)	Planet Earth (2007)	Indigo Nights (2008)

Singles from Planet Earth
- 1. "Guitar" Released: July 9, 2007; 2. "Chelsea Rodgers" Released: August 6, 2007; 3. "Somewhere Here on Earth" Released: September 2007; 4. "The One U Wanna C" Released: 2007

Planet Earth is the thirty-second studio album by American recording artist Prince. It was released on July 15, 2007, by NPG Records and distributed, in the UK, as a free covermount with The Mail on Sunday national newspaper. This was followed by the album's worldwide distribution. It features contributions from his newest protégée Bria Valente and former New Power Generation members Marva King, Sonny T., and Michael Bland, as well as Sheila E. and former Revolution members Wendy & Lisa. The CD package's liner notes credit the album to Prince & The New Power Generation. The album debuted at number 3 on the US Billboard 200 chart, selling 96,000 copies in its first week.

== Release and promotion ==
On June 27, 2007, "Future Baby Mama" was leaked to the Internet via an American online radio station. The first single, "Guitar", was distributed in partnership with Verizon Wireless. During the week of September 3, 2007, Prince flew to Prague, and then Spain to film a music video for "Somewhere Here on Earth". The clip was released but it has only been played on the TV channel BET.

Initially, Prince came to an agreement with Columbia Records to distribute the record worldwide. Prince and Columbia had previously teamed up for the release of his Musicology album in 2004. However, Prince's management struck a deal with The Mail on Sunday to release Planet Earth as a free covermount CD with the July 15, 2007, edition of the paper. This move brought much criticism from UK record stores, which resulted in Columbia refusing to distribute the album in the UK, though its release in the rest of the world remained unaffected.

Giving away albums for free was not new for Prince. In 2004, he gave free copies of Musicology to all concert goers during the tour of the same name. Similarly, the Planet Earth album was given away with tickets to his 2007 concerts in London. As a result of the decision by Sony BMG to not distribute the album in the UK, record store chain HMV announced it would stock the July 15, 2007, edition of The Mail on Sunday in lieu of the CD, admitting that "selling the Mail on Sunday next week will be the only way to make the Prince album available to our customers, which, ultimately, has to be our overriding concern". On July 10, 2007, several days before the official UK release through The Mail on Sunday, a low quality version (recorded from a stream) of Planet Earth was leaked onto the Internet. Prince forwent $4.6 million in licensing fees, but the promotion paid off with his subsequent sold out 21-show concert run at London's O2 Arena, earning him a gross of $23.4 million, and thus an $18.8 million profit.

=== Singles ===
"Guitar" was the first single from Planet Earth. This song was number 39 on Rolling Stone's list of the 100 Best Songs of 2007. The music video for the song, featuring his current dancers "The Twinz" premiered on the Verizon website. It was directed and written by Milos Twilight, and produced by Prince and Milos Twilight, through Umania Digital Studios and Twilight Films.

"Chelsea Rodgers" was the second single released from the album, and was released worldwide on August 6, 2007. The B-side is album track "Mr. Goodnight". A video was made using footage of the band's performance at London Fashion Week. It premièred on October 28, 2007.

"Somewhere Here on Earth" was the third single to be released. On the week of September 3, 2007, Prince flew to Prague, and then Spain to film a music video for the song. The video was produced and written by Milos Twilight, Umania Digital Studios and Twilight Films. The full music video premiered on BET on February 12, 2008.

== Reception ==
Professional ratings
Aggregate scores
Source	Rating
Metacritic	65/100
Review scores
Source	Rating
AllMusic	3.5/5 stars
The A.V. Club	B
Entertainment Weekly	B+
Los Angeles Times	3.5/4 stars
NME	6/10
Pitchfork	4.8/10
Robert Christgau	(3-star Honorable Mention)
Rolling Stone	3.5/5 stars
Slant Magazine	3/5 stars
Spin	4.5/5 stars

The album debuted on the US Billboard 200 at number three with 96,000 units sold in its first week, less than half of both Musicology and 3121. As of April 2015, the album has sold about 278,000 copies in the US, with almost no promotion, with the exception of the Verizon Wireless ad for "Guitar". Although not released as a single, "Future Baby Mama" gathered radio airplay on American R&B radio and charted within the top 40 of Billboard's Hot R&B/Hip-Hop Songs. The song won Prince his last Grammy Award, for Best Male R&B Vocal Performance at the 2008 Grammy Awards.

Planet Earth received generally positive reviews. At Metacritic, it holds an average score of 65 out of 100, based on reviews by professional critics. Veteran critic Robert Christgau gave the album a three-star honorable mention, indicating "an enjoyable effort consumers attuned to its overriding aesthetic or individual vision may well treasure". Writing for MSN Music, he cited "Guitar" and "The One U Wanna C" as highlights and summarized the album with the remark, "Viva Las Vegas and later for Viagra – but not never".

== Track listing ==
All songs written and produced by Prince.

Planet Earth track listing
No.	Title	Length
1.	"Planet Earth"	5:51
2.	"Guitar"	3:45
3.	"Somewhere Here on Earth"	5:45
4.	"The One U Wanna C"	4:29
5.	"Future Baby Mama"	4:47
6.	"Mr. Goodnight"	4:26
7.	"All the Midnights in the World"	2:21
8.	"Chelsea Rodgers"	5:41
9.	"Lion of Judah"	4:10
10.	"Resolution"	3:40

== Charts ==
=== Weekly charts ===
Weekly chart performance for Planet Earth
Chart (2007)	Peak position
Australian Albums (ARIA)	38
Austrian Albums (Ö3 Austria)	11
Belgian Albums (Ultratop Flanders)	5
Belgian Albums (Ultratop Wallonia)	20
Canadian Albums (Nielsen SoundScan)	17
Danish Albums (Hitlisten)	5
Dutch Albums (Album Top 100)	3
Finnish Albums (Suomen virallinen lista)	14
French Albums (SNEP)	16
German Albums (Offizielle Top 100)	7
Italian Albums (FIMI)	16
Norwegian Albums (VG-lista)	9
Spanish Albums (Promusicae)	15
Swedish Albums (Sverigetopplistan)	35
Swiss Albums (Schweizer Hitparade)	1
US Billboard 200	3
US Top R&B/Hip-Hop Albums (Billboard)	1

=== Year-end charts ===
Year-end chart performance for Planet Earth
Chart (2007)	Position
Dutch Albums (Album Top 100)	87
Swiss Albums (Schweizer Hitparade)	67
US Top R&B/Hip-Hop Albums (Billboard)	80

== Certifications ==
Certifications for Planet Earth
Region	Certification	Certified units/sales
Switzerland (IFPI Switzerland)	Gold	15,000^{^}
^{^} Shipments figures based on certification alone.

== Release history ==
Release history for Planet Earth
Country	Date
United Kingdom	July 15, 2007
Germany	July 20, 2007
United States	July 24, 2007
