= 3121 =

Studio album by Prince
- Released: March 21, 2006
- Recorded: November 2004 – early 2006
- Studios: Paisley Park, Chanhassen; 3121
- Genres: R&B; funk; rock; electronica
- Length: 53:42
- Languages: English; Spanish
- Labels: NPG; Universal
- Producer: Prince

Prince chronology
| The Slaughterhouse (2004) | 3121 (2006) | Ultimate Prince (2006) |

Singles from 3121
- 1. "Te Amo Corazón" Released: December 20, 2005; 2. "Beautiful, Loved and Blessed" Released: January 2006; 3. "Black Sweat" Released: February 7, 2006; 4. "Fury" Released: June 27, 2006

Professional ratings
Aggregate scores
| Source | Rating |
|---|---|
| Metacritic | 69/100 |
Review scores
| Source | Rating |
| AllMusic | 4/5 stars |
| Blender | 3/5 stars |
| Entertainment Weekly | C+ |
| Los Angeles Times | 3/4 stars |
| Newsday | A |
| Pitchfork | 6.0/10 |
| Rolling Stone | 4/5 stars |
| Spin | B |
| Stylus Magazine | A− |
| The Village Voice | A− |

3121 (pronounced "thirty-one twenty-one") is the thirty-first studio album by American musician Prince. Released on March 21, 2006 (3/21) by NPG Records and distributed, under a "one-album deal", by Universal Music, the album reinforced Prince's big comeback after the critical success of Musicology (2004). The only Prince album ever to debut atop the Billboard 200 during his lifetime, with over 180,000 copies sold in its first week, it knocked the soundtrack for High School Musical off the top spot and became Prince's first number one album since Batman in 1989, eventually being certified Gold by the Recording Industry Association of America (RIAA). In 2026, it was announced that NPG Records/Legacy will be releasing 3121 (Expanded Edition), which will include 3LPs, 2 CDs and Blu-ray sets. This is to be released on 11 December 2026.

== Album information ==
The album's first single, "Te Amo Corazón", was released in the United States on December 13, 2005; the second single, "Black Sweat", was released on February 2, 2006.

The album title refers to Prince's rental home at 3121 Antelo Rd, Los Angeles. Later homes rented by Prince were colloquially referred to as "3121", including a home owned by professional basketball player Carlos Boozer.

Album sessions started in November 2004 with the recording of the song "3121" at Paisley Park with Michael Bland and Sonny T.

A limited number of albums included "purple tickets", whose finders were flown in from Europe, Asia, Mexico and the US to attend a semi-private performance (along with a long list of celebrities) at Prince's home in Los Angeles.

Tickets for Prince's The Earth Tour in 2007 at London's O2 Arena were priced at £31.21, echoing the title of this album.

== Track listing ==
All tracks are written and produced by Prince.

3121 track listing
| No. | Title | Length |
|---|---|---|
| 1. | "3121" | 4:31 |
| 2. | "Lolita" | 4:06 |
| 3. | "Te Amo Corazón" | 3:35 |
| 4. | "Black Sweat" | 3:12 |
| 5. | "Incense and Candles" | 4:04 |
| 6. | "Love" | 5:45 |
| 7. | "Satisfied" | 2:50 |
| 8. | "Fury" | 4:02 |
| 9. | "The Word" | 4:11 |
| 10. | "Beautiful, Loved and Blessed" (featuring Támar) | 5:43 |
| 11. | "The Dance" | 5:20 |
| 12. | "Get On the Boat" | 6:18 |

== Personnel ==
- Michael Bland (on "3121"), Cora Coleman Dunham (on "Te Amo Corazón," "Get On the Boat") – drums
- Sonny T (on "3121"), Joshua Dunham (on "Te Amo Corazón," "Get On the Boat") – bass
- Maceo Parker, Candy Dulfer, Greg Boyer and Ray – horn section
- Herbert Urena, Ricky Salas (on "Te Amo Corazón"), Sheila E. (on "Get On the Boat") – percussion
- Clare Fischer – string arrangements
- The New Power Generation (shouts), Támar (and co-lead on "Beautiful, Loved and Blessed") – additional and backing vocals
- Prince – all other instruments and voices

Technical

- Produced by Prince
- Photo: Afshin Shahidi
- Designer: Sam Jennings
- Recorded at Paisley Park Studios and 3121
- Engineered by Ian Boxill, L. Stu Young
- Assisted by Lisa Chamblee Hampton
- Mastered at Bernie Grundman Mastering

== Charts ==
=== Weekly charts ===
Weekly chart performance for 3121
| Chart (2006) | Peak position |
|---|---|
| Australian Albums (ARIA) | 18 |
| Austrian Albums (Ö3 Austria) | 15 |
| Belgian Albums (Ultratop Flanders) | 3 |
| Belgian Albums (Ultratop Wallonia) | 15 |
| Canadian Albums (Billboard) | 9 |
| Danish Albums (Hitlisten) | 2 |
| Dutch Albums (Album Top 100) | 3 |
| Finnish Albums (Suomen virallinen lista) | 24 |
| French Albums (SNEP) | 8 |
| German Albums (Offizielle Top 100) | 4 |
| Hungarian Albums (MAHASZ) | 34 |
| Italian Albums (FIMI) | 10 |
| Norwegian Albums (VG-lista) | 5 |
| Polish Albums (ZPAV) | 13 |
| Scottish Albums (Official Charts) | 8 |
| Spanish Albums (Promusicae) | 40 |
| Swedish Albums (Sverigetopplistan) | 18 |
| Swiss Albums (Schweizer Hitparade) | 1 |
| UK Albums (Official Charts) | 9 |
| UK R&B Albums (Official Charts) | 2 |
| US Billboard 200 | 1 |
| US Indie Store Album Sales (Billboard) | 1 |
| US Top R&B/Hip-Hop Albums (Billboard) | 1 |

=== Year-end charts ===
Year-end chart performance for 3121
| Chart (2006) | Position |
|---|---|
| Belgian Albums (Ultratop Flanders) | 75 |
| Dutch Albums (Album Top 100) | 53 |
| French Albums (SNEP) | 193 |
| German Albums (Offizielle Top 100) | 97 |
| Swiss Albums (Schweizer Hitparade) | 60 |
| US Billboard 200 | 134 |
| US Top R&B/Hip-Hop Albums (Billboard) | 46 |

== Certifications ==
Certifications for 3121
| Region | Certification | Certified units/sales |
|---|---|---|
| Switzerland (IFPI Switzerland) | Gold | 15,000^{^} |
| United Kingdom (BPI) | Silver | 60,000^{^} |
| United States (RIAA) | Gold | 500,000^{^} |
^{^} Shipments figures based on certification alone.
