= Prince albums discography =

Recording collections by American musician

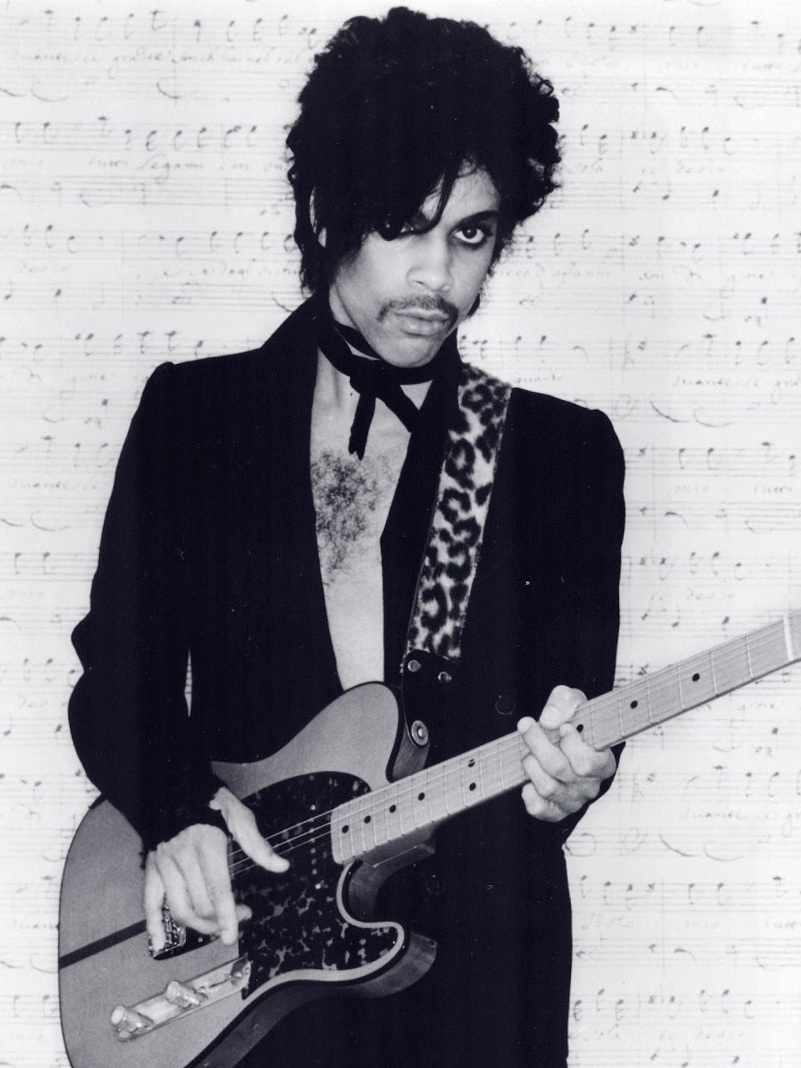
- Prince in 1981
- Studio albums: 39
- Live albums: 6
- Compilation albums: 9
- Special editions: 8
- Posthumous albums: 4
- Internet albums: 13
- Madhouse albums: 2
- New Power Generation albums: 3
- NPG Orchestra albums: 1

Prince's albums discography consists of 39 studio albums (including 4 soundtrack albums) and 6 live albums. An additional 4 studio albums have been released posthumously. Numerous compilations have also been released. Prince maintained a large archive of unreleased recordings known as the Vault, parts of which have since been issued on his posthumous albums and on deluxe box set reissues of his earlier work. Prince also released several albums under various group names. See Prince singles discography for his singles and extended plays, and Prince videography for his music videos and video albums.

Prince has sold over 100 million records worldwide, including 36.5 million certified units in the United States, and over 10 million records in the United Kingdom. Rolling Stone ranked him at No. 27 on its list of the 100 Greatest Artists of All Time.

In the weeks following his death in April 2016, 19 different Prince albums charted on the Billboard 200 all at the same time, and he became the first artist ever to have 5 albums in the Billboard top 10 simultaneously.

== Overview ==
Prince signed a record deal with Warner Bros. Records when he was 19, soon releasing the albums For You (1978) and Prince (1979). He went on to achieve critical success with the influential albums Dirty Mind (1980), Controversy (1981), and 1999 (1982). His sixth album, Purple Rain (1984), was recorded with his new backing band the Revolution, and was also the soundtrack to the film of the same name in which he starred. Purple Rain garnered continued success for Prince and was a major commercial achievement, spending six consecutive months atop the Billboard 200 chart. The soundtrack also won Prince the Academy Award for Best Original Song Score. After disbanding the Revolution, Prince released the album Sign o' the Times (1987), widely hailed by critics as the greatest work of his career.

Prince was a prolific musician who released 39 albums during his life, with a vast array of unreleased material left in a custom-built bank vault underneath his home after his death, including fully completed albums enough that 1 album could be released every year for the next 100 years and over 50 finished music videos. Released posthumously, his demo albums Piano and a Microphone 1983 (2018) and Originals (2019) both received critical acclaim.

== Studio albums ==
Title	Album details	Peak chart positions											Certifications (sales thresholds)
Title	Album details	US	AUS	AUT	CAN	GER	NLD	NOR	NZ	SWE	SWI	UK	Certifications (sales thresholds)
For You	Released: April 7, 1978; Label: Warner Bros.	138	—	—	—	—	—	—	—	—	—	156	
Prince	Released: October 19, 1979; Label: Warner Bros.	22	—	—	—	—	—	—	—	—	92	—	RIAA: Platinum; BPI: Silver
Dirty Mind	Released: October 8, 1980; Label: Warner Bros.	45	—	—	—	—	—	—	—	—	79	61	RIAA: Gold
Controversy	Released: October 14, 1981; Label: Warner Bros.	21	55	—	—	—	50	—	—	—	—	—	RIAA: Platinum; BPI: Gold
1999	Released: October 27, 1982; Label: Warner Bros.	9	35	—	23	37	45	—	6	—	26	28	RIAA: 4× Platinum; BPI: Platinum; MC: Platinum
Purple Rain^{[A]}	Released: June 25, 1984; Label: Warner Bros.	1	1	8	1	5	1	4	2	3	7	4	RIAA: 13× Platinum; ARIA: 3× Platinum; BPI: 2× Platinum; MC: 6× Platinum
Around the World in a Day^{[A]}	Released: April 22, 1985; Label: Paisley Park, Warner Bros.	1	12	7	16	10	1	10	16	1	8	5	RIAA: 2× Platinum; BPI: Gold
Parade^{[A]}	Released: March 31, 1986; Label: Paisley Park, Warner Bros.	3	8	7	11	6	1	10	7	5	2	4	RIAA: Platinum; BPI: Platinum
Sign o' the Times	Released: March 30, 1987; Label: Paisley Park, Warner Bros.	6	20	2	27	3	2	3	6	6	1	4	RIAA: Platinum; ARIA: Gold; BPI: Platinum; MC: 4× Platinum
Lovesexy	Released: May 10, 1988; Label: Paisley Park, Warner Bros.	11	8	3	7	4	1	2	1	1	1	1	RIAA: Gold; BPI: Platinum
Batman	Released: June 20, 1989; Label: Warner Bros.	1	4	3	1	3	1	2	4	2	1	1	RIAA: 2× Platinum; BPI: Platinum
Graffiti Bridge	Released: August 20, 1990; Label: Paisley Park, Warner Bros.	6	10	8	22	4	4	2	3	7	2	1	RIAA: Gold; BPI: Gold; MC: Gold
Diamonds and Pearls^{[B]}	Released: October 1, 1991; Label: Paisley Park, Warner Bros.	3	1	4	8	8	6	5	5	8	3	2	RIAA: 2× Platinum; ARIA: 4× Platinum; BPI: 3× Platinum; MC: 2× Platinum
Love Symbol^{[B]}	Released: October 13, 1992; Label: Paisley Park, Warner Bros.	5	1	1	16	5	6	10	4	10	4	1	RIAA: Platinum; ARIA: Platinum; BPI: Platinum
Come	Released: August 16, 1994; Label: Warner Bros.	15	2	4	34	9	4	7	16	7	4	1	RIAA: Gold; BPI: Gold
The Black Album	Released: November 22, 1994; Label: Warner Bros.	47	15	7	48	49	35	—	—	—	8	36	
The Gold Experience	Released: September 26, 1995; Label: NPG, Warner Bros.	6	13	28	35	24	3	12	—	11	7	4	RIAA: Gold; BPI: Gold
Chaos and Disorder	Released: July 9, 1996; Label: Warner Bros.	26	54	17	43	42	8	15	—	32	21	14	
Emancipation	Released: November 19, 1996; Label: NPG, EMI	11	8	13	24	21	13	27	22	22	1	18	RIAA: 2× Platinum; MC: Platinum
Crystal Ball	Released: January 29, 1998; Label: NPG; Initially released as a limited edition 5-CD box set together with The Truth and Kamasutra by the NPG Orchestra and a 4-CD box set together with The Truth.	62	—	—	—	—	—	—	—	—	—	—	
The Truth	Released: January 29, 1998; Label: NPG; Initially released as a limited edition 5-CD box set together with Crystal Ball and Kamasutra by the NPG Orchestra and a 4-CD box set together with Crystal ball.	64	—	—	—	—	31	—	—	—	—	—	
The Vault: Old Friends 4 Sale	Released: August 24, 1999; Label: Warner Bros.	85	—	40	—	44	15	—	—	—	21	47	
Rave Un2 the Joy Fantastic	Released: November 2, 1999; Label: NPG, Arista	18	82	44	5	39	17	37	—	51	19	145	RIAA: Gold
The Rainbow Children	Released: November 20, 2001; Label: NPG, Redline Entertainment	109	—	60	—	29	28	—	—	—	30	—	
One Nite Alone...	Released: May 14, 2002; Label: NPG	—	—	—	—	—	—	—	—	—	—	—	
Xpectation	Released: January 1, 2003; Label: NPG	—	—	—	—	—	—	—	—	—	—	—	
N·E·W·S	Released: May 26, 2003; Label: NPG, MP Media	—	—	—	—	93	83	—	—	—	—	—	
Musicology	Released: March 27, 2004; Label: NPG, Columbia	3	19	4	11	4	3	2	25	6	2	3	RIAA: 2× Platinum; BPI: Gold; MC: Gold
The Chocolate Invasion	Released: March 29, 2004; Label: NPG	—	—	—	—	—	—	—	—	—	—	—	
The Slaughterhouse	Released: March 29, 2004; Label: NPG	—	—	—	—	—	—	—	—	—	—	—	
3121	Released: March 21, 2006; Label: NPG, Universal	1	18	15	9	4	3	5	—	18	1	9	RIAA: Gold; BPI: Silver
Planet Earth	Released: July 24, 2007; Label: NPG, Columbia	3	38	11	17	7	3	9	—	35	1	—	
Lotusflow3r / MPLSound	Released: March 29, 2009; Label: NPG; Released as a 3-CD set together with Elixer by Bria Valente	2	—	—	—	—	23	—	—	—	—	—	
20Ten	Released: July 10, 2010; Label: NPG	—	—	—	—	—	—	—	—	—	—	—	
Plectrumelectrum^{[C]}	Released: September 26, 2014; Label: NPG, Warner Bros.	8	33	10	—	31	9	8	31	50	8	11	
Art Official Age^{[C]}	Released: September 26, 2014; Label: NPG, Warner Bros.	5	15	8	21	18	4	2	17	9	4	8	
Hit n Run Phase One	Released: September 7, 2015; Label: NPG	48	25	53	—	53	11	—	—	—	27	50	
Hit n Run Phase Two	Released: December 12, 2015; Label: NPG	40	117	20	47	21	38	—	—	50	9	21	

A With The Revolution
B With The New Power Generation
C With 3rdeyegirl

== Posthumous albums ==
Title	Album details	Peak chart positions									
Title	Album details	US	AUS	AUT	CAN	GER	NLD	NOR	SWE	SWI	UK
Piano and a Microphone 1983	Released: September 21, 2018; Label: NPG / Warner Bros.; Note: Compilation album	11	33	10	87	12	5	18	22	6	12
Originals	Released: June 7, 2019; Label: NPG / Warner Bros.; Note: Compilation album	15	18	34	66	26	11	—	54	9	21
Welcome 2 America	Released: July 30, 2021; Label: NPG / Legacy	4	5	3	26	3	2	39	53	2	5
Timeless	Released: August 28, 2026; Label: NPG / Legacy	59	45	5	—	14	6	—	—	1	62

== Live albums ==
Title	Album details	Peak chart positions				
Title	Album details	US	US R&B/ HH	GER	NLD	SWI
One Nite Alone... Live!	Released: December 17, 2002; Label: NPG	—^{[A]}	—	58	—	36
C-Note	Released: March 29, 2004; Label: NPG	—	—	—	—	—
Indigo Nights	Released: September 30, 2008; Label: NPG	—	—	—	—	—
Up All Nite with Prince: The One Nite Alone Collection	Released: May 29, 2020; Label: NPG / Legacy	—^{[B]}	—	30	38	61
Prince and the Revolution: Live	Released: June 4, 2022; Label: Warner Bros.	22	11	8	—	7
Live at Glam Slam	Released: October 11, 2023; Label: NPG / Warner Bros.	—	—	—	—	—

A One Nite Alone... Live! did not enter the US Billboard 200, put peaked at number 95 on the Top Album Sales component chart.
B Up All Nite with Prince: The One Nite Alone Collection did not enter the US Billboard 200, put peaked at number 19 on the Top Album Sales component chart.

== Special editions ==
This section contains remix albums, mixtapes and special (expanded) editions from previously released albums.

Title	Album details	Peak chart positions					
Title	Album details	US	US R&B	AUT	NLD	SWI	UK
The Versace Experience: Prelude 2 Gold	Released: July 8, 1995 (limited edition cassette); Re-released: April 13, 2019 (limited edition cassette); Re-released: September 13, 2019 (all other formats); Label: NPG / Legacy	170	17	50	29	30	83
Rave In2 the Joy Fantastic	Released: April 29, 2001; Label: NPG	—^{[A]}	—	—	—	—	—
Purple Rain: Deluxe / Deluxe Expanded	Released: June 23, 2017; Label: Warner Bros.	4	3	9	3	12	7
Ultimate Rave	Released: April 26, 2019; Label: Legacy	—^{[B]}	—	—	85	—	—
1999: Remastered / Deluxe / Super Deluxe	Released: November 29, 2019; Label: Warner Bros.	45	20	72	15	26	46
Sign o' the Times: Remastered / Deluxe / Super Deluxe	Released: September 25, 2020; Label: Warner Bros.	20	2	—	2	3	7
Diamonds and Pearls Super Deluxe Edition	Released: October 27, 2023; Label: NPG / Legacy / Warner	85	10	9	5	11	50
Around the World in a Day Deluxe Expanded Edition	Released: November 21, 2025; Label: NPG / Legacy / Warner	176	24	—	29	—	87

A Rave In2 the Joy Fantastic did not enter the US Billboard 200, put peaked at number 14 on the Vinyl Albums chart.
B Ultimate Rave did not enter the US Billboard 200, put peaked at number 69 on the Top Album Sales component chart.

== Compilation albums ==
Title	Album details	Peak chart positions											Certifications (sales thresholds)
Title	Album details	US	AUS	AUT	CAN	GER	NLD	NOR	NZ	SWE	SWI	UK	Certifications (sales thresholds)
His Majesty's Pop Life	Released: Late 1985 (Japan only promotional copy); Re-released: April 13, 2019; Label: Paisley Park / Warner Bros.	184	—	—	—	—	—	—	—	—	—	—	
The Hits 1	Released: September 14, 1993; Label: Paisley Park / Warner Bros.	46	19	7	34	20	14	15	12	10	22	5	RIAA: Platinum; ARIA: Platinum; BPI: Platinum
The Hits 2	Released: September 14, 1993; Label: Paisley Park / Warner Bros.	54	20	9	36	19	15	14	8	6	10	5	RIAA: Platinum; ARIA: Gold; BPI: Platinum
The Hits/The B-Sides	Released: September 14, 1993; Label: Paisley Park / Warner Bros.	4	4	—	19	58	10	11	1	19	9	4	RIAA: Platinum; ARIA: 2× Platinum; BPI: Gold; RMNZ: Platinum
Girl 6	Released: March 19, 1996; Label: Warner Bros.	75	—	—	—	—	83	—	—	—	—	—	
The Very Best of Prince	Released: July 31, 2001; Label: Warner Bros.	1	2	5	1	5	3	2	1	4	1	2	RIAA: Platinum; ARIA: 2× Platinum; BPI: 3× Platinum; MC: Gold; RMNZ: Platinum
Ultimate Prince	Released: August 22, 2006; Label: Warner Bros.	6	6	22	12	19	39	10	3	7	9	3	BPI: Platinum; RMNZ: Platinum
4Ever	Released: November 22, 2016; Label: NPG / Warner Bros.	33	36	64	40	87	10	—	—	—	21	21	BPI: Platinum
Anthology: 1995–2010	Released: August 17, 2018; Label: NPG / Legacy	—^{[A]}	—	—	—	—	197	—	—	—	100	—	

A Anthology: 1995–2010 did not enter the US Billboard 200, put peaked at number 85 on the Current Album Sales component chart.

== Internet albums ==
This section lists albums that have only been made available for download on the internet.

Title	Album details
NPG Music Club Volume 1	Released: February 18, 2001; Label: NPG
NPG Music Club Volume 2	Released: March 22, 2001; Label: NPG
NPG Music Club Volume 3	Released: April 22, 2001; Label: NPG
NPG Music Club Volume 4	Released: May 15, 2001; Label: NPG
NPG Music Club Volume 5	Released: June 11, 2001; Label: NPG
NPG Music Club Volume 6	Released: July 7, 2001; Label: NPG
NPG Music Club Volume 7	Released: August 28, 2001; Label: NPG
NPG Music Club Volume 8	Released: September 18, 2001; Label: NPG
NPG Music Club Volume 9	Released: October 16, 2001; Label: NPG
NPG Music Club Volume 10	Released: November 15, 2001; Label: NPG
NPG Music Club Volume 11	Released: December 15, 2001; Label: NPG
NPG Music Club Volume 12	Released: January 17, 2002; Label: NPG
Lotusflow3r (download version including "The Morning After" replacing "Crimson and Clover")	Released: March 24, 2009; Label: NPG

== Albums credited to Madhouse ==
Title	Album details	Peak chart positions
Title	Album details	US
8	Released: January 21, 1987; Label: Paisley Park	107
16	Released: November 18, 1987; Label: Paisley Park	—

== Albums credited to The New Power Generation ==
Title	Album details	Peak chart positions									
Title	Album details	US	US R&B/ HH	AUS	AUT	GER	NLD	NOR	SWE	SWI	UK
Gold Nigga	Released: August 31, 1993; Label: NPG	—	—	—	—	—	—	—	—	—	—
Exodus	Released: March 27, 1995; Label: NPG	—	—	—	—	—	31	—	—	34	11
Newpower Soul	Released: June 30, 1998; Label: NPG; Also released as a 3-CD box together with Chaka Khan's Come 2 My House and Graham Central Station's GCS 2000	22	9	47	24	34	23	40	57	22	38

== Albums credited to The NPG Orchestra ==
Title	Album details
Kamasutra	Released: February 14, 1997 (limited edition cassette); Released: January 29, 1998 (limited edition CD as part of the 5-CD box set Crystal Ball / The Truth / Kamasutra); Label: NPG

== Bibliography ==
- Nilsen, Per; Joozt Mattheij (2004). The Vault – The Definitive Guide to the Musical World of Prince. Uptown. ISBN 91-631-5482-X.
