= Anthology: 1995–2010 =

Compilation album by Prince
- Released: August 17, 2018
- Studio: Various
- Length: 197:29
- Labels: NPG; Legacy
- Producer: Prince

Prince chronology
4Ever (2016)	Anthology: 1995–2010 (2018)	Piano and a Microphone 1983 (2018)

Anthology: 1995–2010 is the second posthumous compilation album by Prince, released digitally by NPG Records, in association with Legacy Recordings, through streaming platforms including Spotify and Apple Music on August 17, 2018.

== Album information ==
The compilation was released at the same time that the Prince estate allowed most of Prince's latter period albums—from 1995's The Gold Experience to 2010's 20Ten—to be made available for the first time on streaming platforms other than Tidal, which was previously the only streaming service to have exclusive rights to the catalog from that era. The album was curated with the help of Prince's estate and comprises 37 songs. The songs are arranged non-chronologically.

One major omission was Prince's only UK number-one single "The Most Beautiful Girl in the World", from 1994. This was due to a long-running copyright dispute that had not been settled by the time of Prince's death in 2016, effectively leaving the song in limbo; not being able to be re-released. This also left The Gold Experience reissue in doubt for years. The copyright dispute was resolved in 2022, and both "The Most Beautiful Girl in the World" and The Gold Experience were reissued.

== Reception ==
Professional ratings
Review scores
Source	Rating
AllMusic	4/5 stars
Rolling Stone	4/5 stars

In a review for AllMusic, Stephen Thomas Erlewine stated that a compilation like Anthology was "badly needed" due to Prince's prolific catalog of music after he left Warner. He lamented the absence of Prince's soul covers on the album, but concluded that Anthology demonstrated "not just [Prince's] versatility, but how his sense of craft never failed him".

Will Hermes in a review for Rolling Stone expressed a similar opinion to Erlewine's. He also noted the absence of Prince's covers, but praised the compilation as "testimony to the quality of [Prince's] output" during his less commercially successful years.

== Track listing ==
Anthology: 1995–2010 track listing
No.	Title	Original album	Length
1.	"Emancipation"	Emancipation (1996)	4:13
2.	"Black Sweat"	3121 (2006)	3:11
3.	"P. Control"	The Gold Experience (1995)	5:59
4.	"Crucial"	Crystal Ball (1998)	5:08
5.	"The Love We Make"	Emancipation	4:39
6.	"I Hate U" (LP Version)	The Gold Experience	6:07
7.	"The Greatest Romance Ever Sold"	Rave Un2 the Joy Fantastic (1999)	5:33
8.	"I Love U, But I Don't Trust U Anymore" (featuring Ani DiFranco)	Rave Un2 the Joy Fantastic	3:36
9.	"Gold"	The Gold Experience	7:22
10.	"Guitar"	Planet Earth (2007)	3:45
11.	"Dream Factory"	Crystal Ball	3:07
12.	"The Work, pt. 1"	The Rainbow Children (2001)	4:28
13.	"Call My Name"	Musicology (2004)	5:15
14.	"Strays of the World"	Crystal Ball	6:06
15.	"Shhh"	The Gold Experience	7:17
16.	"Dreamer"	Lotusflow3r (2009)	5:32
17.	"Chaos and Disorder"	Chaos and Disorder (1996)	4:19
18.	"Endorphinmachine"	The Gold Experience	4:06
19.	"Musicology"	Musicology	4:24
20.	"Northside"	The Slaughterhouse (2004)	6:31
21.	"When I Lay My Hands on U"	The Chocolate Invasion (2004)	3:40
22.	"Beautiful Strange"	Rave In2 the Joy Fantastic (2001)	4:55
23.	"Future Soul Song"	20Ten (2010)	5:08
24.	"Empty Room" (live from One Nite Alone... Tour 2002)	C-Note (2003)	4:00
25.	"3rd Eye"	The Truth (1998)	4:54
26.	"U're Gonna C Me"	One Nite Alone... (2002)	5:16
27.	"Dinner with Delores"	Chaos and Disorder	2:46
28.	"Ol' Skool Company"	MPLSound (2009)	7:30
29.	"4ever"	Lotusflow3r	3:47
30.	"West"	N.E.W.S (2003)	14:00
31.	"Xpedition"	Xpectation (2003)	8:23
32.	"Muse 2 the Pharaoh"	The Rainbow Children	4:21
33.	"Somewhere Here on Earth"	Planet Earth	5:45
34.	"U Make My Sun Shine" (with Angie Stone)	The Chocolate Invasion	7:05
35.	"1+1+1 Is 3"	The Rainbow Children	5:17
36.	"Chelsea Rodgers"	Planet Earth	5:41
37.	"We March"	The Gold Experience	4:49

== Charts ==
Chart performance for Anthology: 1995–2010
Chart (2018)	Peak position
Belgian Albums (Ultratop Flanders)	114
Swiss Albums (Schweizer Hitparade)	100
US Current Album Sales (Billboard)	85
