= List of music released from NPG Music Club =

This is a list of songs released by Prince and the New Power Generation on his then-official website NPG Music Club, released between 2001 and 2005. The list includes early radio transmissions (called "AHDIO SHOWS", usually mixed in sequence and containing a mix of old and new material, along with other artists' material), digital singles, and albums of new material.

== 2001 ==
Tracks marked with an ¤ are premium member bonuses.

=== Free giveaway tracks ===
==== Audio ====
- "When Eye Lay My Hands On U" - Prince
- NPGMC commercial

==== Video ====
- NPGMC Intro Video

=== February ===
==== NPG Ahdio Show (Transmission #1) ====
- Introduction - Tora Tora
- "The Juice" - Carmen Electra
- "Gothic Metal (Instr.)" - Jacob Armen
- Segue - Tora Tora
- "Love Sign (Ted’s Funky Chariot Remix)" - Prince with Nona Gaye
- Segue - Tora Tora
- "When Eye Lay My Hands On U" - Prince
- Segue - Tora Tora
- "High" - Prince
- Segue - Rhonda Smith
- "Calling To Say Goodbye" - Rhonda Smith
- Segue - Rhonda Smith
- "To The Teeth" - Ani DiFranco
- "Mother Earth" - Rhonda Smith
- "Spanish Coloured Romance" - Cindy Blackman
- Segue - Morris Hayes
- "My Medallion" - Prince
- Segue
- "Golden Parachute" - Prince
- "Passing Your Name" - DVS
- "Kamasutra Overture #8 (Remix)" - NPG Orchestra
- Segue - Montalbo's Hair Studio (Commercial)
- "Dance Un2 The Rhythm (Remix)" - Louie Louie
- "I Like It There" - Prince
- Segue - Tora Tora
- "Days of Wild" (Live at Paisley Park, 23 October 1999) - Prince

==== Audio ====
- "When Eye Lay My Hands On U" - Prince
- "Peace" - Prince and the New Power Generation
- "Funky Design" - Prince
- "Mad" - Prince
- "Splash" - Prince and the Revolution

==== Video ====
- "U Make My Sun Shine" - Prince and Angie Stone
- "When Eye Lay My Hands On U" - Prince

=== March ===
==== NPG Ahdio Show (Transmission #2) ====
- Intro - Salome
- "Groove On (Baby Let's Go)" - Larry Graham
- Speech - Salome
- "Silicon" - Prince
- "Circle of Amour" - Prince
- Salome Introduction
- "We March (Live)" - Prince & The NPG
- "Vicki Waiting (Live)" - Prince & The NPG
- "Letitgo (Live)" - Prince & The NPG
- Jazz Segue - Salome
- NPGMC Promo Jingle / Speech
- Segue - Femi Jiya
- "Rowdy Mac" - The Fonky Baldheads
- "Fonky Like a" -The Fonky Baldheads
- "Can You Say Love" - Derek Hughes
- "Soul Sanctuary" - Prince
- "1, 2 ('The Future')" - Prince
- Segue - Femi Jiya Interview
- "My Computer" - Prince
- Segue - NPG Audio
- "Crazy Fingers" - Jacob Armen
- "Dinner with Delores" - Prince
- Instrumental Extro
- Segue - NPG Audio

==== Audio ====
- "We March (Live)" - Prince & The NPG
- "Vicki Waiting (Live)" - Prince & The NPG
- "Letitgo (Live)" - Prince & The NPG
- "Return of The Bump Squad (Live)" - Prince & The NPG

==== Video ====
- "Controversy/Mutiny (Live)" - Prince
- "The Daisy Chain" - Prince & The NPG

=== April ===
==== NPG Ahdio Show (Transmission #3) ====
- "Murph Drag" - The Time
- "The Ballad of Dorothy Parker" - Prince
- "The Work (Part 1)" - Prince
- "Superfunkycalifragisexy (Instr.)" - Prince
- "Intellipop (Instr.)" - Rhonda Smith
- "Dandelion" - Millenia
- "Imagine That" - Ani DiFranco
- "O.K." by Ani DiFranco
- "America (Live '86)" - Prince & The Revolution
- Segue - "Do It Right"
- "Chaos and Disorder" - Prince
- "Sex Me, Sex Me Not" - Prince
- Segue
- "Eye'magettin'" - Larry Graham
- "Northside" - Prince
- Extro

==== Audio ====
- "Northside" - Prince
- "Habibi" - Prince^{1}
- "The Work, Pt. 1" - Prince
- "The Daisy Chain" - Prince & The NPG¤

^{1} - Live cover of "Machine Gun" by Jimi Hendrix

=== May ===
==== NPG Ahdio Show (Transmission #4) ====
- "Props N' Pounds" - Prince
- Segue - "Celebration" announcement: The Rainbow Children + Greatest Hits
- "Christopher Tracy's Parade (Live)" - Prince and the Revolution
- "New Position (Live)" - Prince and the Revolution
- "I Wonder U (Live)" - Prince and the Revolution
- "Raspberry Beret (Live)" - Prince and the Revolution
- "Delirious (Live)" - Prince and the Revolution
- "Controversy (Live)" - Prince and the Revolution
- "A Love Bizarre (Live)" - Prince and the Revolution
- "Hit U in the Socket" - Rosie Gaines
- "Strange Relationship (Live)" - Prince
- "Get Wild (Live)" - Prince & The NPG
- "Damn U (Live)" - Prince & The NPG
- "The Max (Live)" - Prince & The NPG
- Segue - Commercial
- "This Crazy Life of Mine" - Chaka Khan
- Segue - Commercial
- "Johnny (Live)" - Prince & The NPG
- Segue
- Extro

==== Audio ====
- "Props N' Pounds" - Prince
- "Hit U in the Socket" - Rosie Gaines
- "Sex In My Bones" - The Fonky Bald Heads

==== Video ====
- "Get Wild (Per4mance)" - The NPG
- "The Work, Pt. 1 (Live)" - Prince
- "I Could Never Take The Place of Your Man / Summertime (Live)" - Prince¤
- "The Ballad of Dorothy Parker / Four (Live)" - Prince¤

=== June ===
==== NPG Ahdio Show (Transmission #5) ====
- Intro - Salome
- "The Rainbow Children" - Prince
- "Pop My Clutch" - Chaka Khan
- Segue - Salome
- "Family Name" - Prince
- "Race (Alt.)" - Prince
- Segue - Salome
- "Sometimes It Snows in April" - Prince and the Revolution
- Segue - Salome
- "Eye Hate U (Quiet Nite Mix)" - Prince
- "Heaven Must Be Near" - Ingrid Chavez
- Segue
- "The Most Beautiful Girl In The World (Mustang Mix)" - Prince
- Segue - Geneva
- "The Future (William Orbit Remix)" - Prince
- Segue - Geneva
- "The Good Life (Big City Remix)" - The NPG
- "The Digital Garden" - Prince
- "Deep" - N'Dambi
- Segue - Geneva
- "Goldie's Parade" - The NPG
- "Violet The Organ Grinder" - Prince
- Segue
- "Six" - Madhouse
- "Seven" - Madhouse
- "Eight" - Madhouse
- Extro

==== Audio ====
- "Sex Me, Sex Me Not" - Prince
- "Supercute" - Prince
- "Y Should Eye Do That When Eye Can Do This?" - Prince¤

==== Video ====
- "Prettyman (Live)" - Prince and the NPG
- "Baby Knows (Live)" - Prince
- "The Ride (Live)" - Prince¤

=== July ===
==== NPG Ahdio Show (Transmission #6) ====
- Intro: Celebration 2001 thank U's + snippets from performances
  - "We gon' make it funky" - Maceo Parker
  - "The light" - Maceo Parker
  - "Alright with me" - Erykah Badu
  - "Throw your hands up" - Fonky Baldheads
  - "Jerk out" - The Time
  - "How come U don't call me" - Alicia Keys
  - "Give it up or turn it loose / Sex machine" - Common
- "(Get) Her Way" - Kip Blackshire
- "U Can Touch Me" - Autobox
- "Dance with Me" - Kip Blackshire
- SEGUE
- "Baby Knows" - Prince
- Segue - Salsa and peppers Intro (Jacob Armen)
- "Get Wild (Money Maker Funky Jazz Mix)" - The NPG
- "Asswhuppin' in a trunk (Instr.)" - Madhouse
- "Blood is thicker than time" - Mavis Staples
- Segue
- "Rock 'n' Roll is Alive! (and it lives in Minneapolis)" - Prince
- Segue
- "Cream (NPG Mix)" - Prince and the NPG
- "Things Have Gotta Change (Tony M. Rap)" - Prince and the NPG
- "My Name Is Prince (House Mix)" - Prince and the NPG
- Segue
- "2 Whom It May Concern" - Prince and the NPG
- "The Other Side of the Pillow" - Prince
- "The One (Remix)" - The NPG
- Outro

==== Audio ====
- "S&M Groove" - Prince
- "Van Gogh" - Prince
- "Hypno Paradise" - Prince
- "Instrumental" - Prince

==== Video ====
- "Endorphinmachine (Live)" - Prince
- "One Song" - Prince

=== August ===
==== NPG Ahdio Show (Transmission #7) ====
- Intro ("Judas Kiss" - Prince)
- "The good life (Platinum People Mix)" - The NPG
- "Shall we dance" - Brownmark
- "Kain't turn back" - Mavis Staples
- "Higher than high" - Tony LeMans
- "High" - Prince
- "Good Judy girlfriend" - Carmen Electra
- Segue - NPG Ahdio
- "100 M.P.H" - Mazarati
- Segue
- Live Medley - Prince and the Revolution:
  - "Automatic"
  - "DMSR"
  - "The Dance Electric"
- Segue - NPG Ahdio
- "The drama" - Chaka Khan
- "Whispering dandelions" - Ingrid Chavez
- "Standing at the altar" - Margie Cox
- Segue
- "The greatest romance ever sold (Jason Nevin Ext. Remix" - Prince
- Outro ("Judas Kiss" - Prince)

==== Audio ====
- "Judas Kiss" - Prince^{1}
- "Get Wild (Miami Mix)" - The NPG
- "Horny Pony" - Prince and the NPG
- "Golden Parachute (Long Version)" - Prince¤

==== Video ====
- "Bambi (Live)" - Prince and the NPG

^{1} - Retitled "Judas Smile"

=== September ===
==== NPG Ahdio Show (Transmission #8) ====
- Intro:
  - "Love, Thy will be done (Prince Mix)" - Martika
  - "Eye No" - Prince
  - "The Cross" - Prince
  - "The Plan" - The NPG Orchestra
- "The Plan" - The NPG Orchestra
- "Anna Stesia" - Prince
- "Elephants and Flowers" - Prince
- "Eye Wish U Heaven" - Prince
- "Love, Thy will be Done (Prince Mix)" - Martika
- "Pearls B4 the swine" - Prince
- "7 (Acoustic Version)" - Prince and the NPG
- "Space (Universal Love Remix)" - Prince
- "Still would Stand all time" - Prince
- "Into the Light" - Prince
- "I Will" - Prince
- "The Holy River" - Prince
- Outro:
  - "The Plan" - The NPG Orchestra
  - "Positivity" - Prince

==== Audio ====
- "My Medallion" - Prince
- "Thieves In The Temple (Remix) - Prince
- "Rebirth of the Flesh (Rehearsal '88) - Prince
- "Contest Song (Instrumental)" - The NPG¤

==== Video ====
- "If I Was Ur Girlfriend (Live)" - Prince and the NPG

=== October ===
All members got a download of "The Rainbow Children"; premium members could download both a low and high-quality MP3 (the entire album as one file) starting October 17th, while basic members got the low-quality MP3 starting November 1st. See the album article for more details.

=== November ===
==== NPG Ahdio Show (Transmission #9) ====
- "The Rainbow Children/Last December" excerpts with various fan comments about the album
- "(Jukebox with a) Heartbeat" - Prince
- "The Stick (Updated Version)" - The Time
- "Do it all night" - Prince
- Segue - Pay Girl Rap
- Segue - "Release It!" Intro
- "Jungle Jazz" - Jacob Armen
- "Willing and able" - Prince & The NPG
- "Northside Jam (Rehearsal/Live)" - The NPG
- "Real thing" - Tony LeMans
- "Love on a blue train (Live)" - Sheila E.
- Live NY medley - Prince:
  - "Let's Go Crazy"
  - "Kiss
  - "Irresistible Bitch"
  - "She's Always In My Hair"
  - "When You Were Mine"
  - "Insatiable"
  - "Scandalous"
- Outro

==== Audio ====
- "Vavoom" - Prince
- "Underneath the Cream" - Prince
- "Live 4 Love (Live)" - Prince and the NPG
- "The Undertaker (Live)" - Prince
- "We Gon' Make It Funky (Live)" - Maceo Parker and Prince¤

===== NPGMC "Contest Song" Choices =====
- "Where Are Your Dandelions?" - Dana D.
- "How Could I Love You More?" - Miles Rivers
- "No War" - The Muse

==== Video ====
- "Live 4 Love (Live)" - Prince and the NPG
- "The Undertaker (Live)" - Prince and the NPG
- "Love Sign" - Prince and Nona Gaye
- "We Gon' Make It Funky (Live)" - Maceo Parker and Prince¤

=== December ===
==== NPG Ahdio Show (Transmission #10) ====
- Intro
- "New Power Soul" - The NPG
- "Face Down (X-tended Rap Money Mix)" - Prince
- "18 & Over" - Prince
- "My Medallion" - Prince
- "Groove On" - Larry Graham
- "Mad Sex" - The NPG
- "Gett Off" - Prince and the NPG
- "I Rock, There4 I Am"
- "Partyup" - Prince
- "Controversy" - Prince
- "Peace" - The NPG
- Outro

==== Audio ====
- "Gamillah" - Prince
- "Silicon" - Prince
- "High" - Prince
- "Poorgoo (Live)" - Prince
- "Gett Off (Live)" - Prince and the NPG¤

==== Video ====
- "Poor Goo (Live)" - Prince
- "Dolphin" - Prince
- "Gett Off (Live)" - Prince and the NPG¤

== 2002 ==
=== January ===
==== NPG Ahdio Show (Transmission #11) ====
- Intro
- Mega-Mix by DJ Dudley D:
  - "The human body"
  - "Hot with U"
  - "New World"
  - "Partyman"
  - "Raspberry beret" (12" Remix)
  - "High"
  - "Undisputed (The Moneyopolis Mix)"
  - "Prettyman"
  - "The Work, Pt. 1"
- "The Question of U" (live/rehearsal)
- "Face Down/The Undertaker" (live/rehearsal)
- "Courtin' Time" (live/rehearsal)

==== Audio ====
- "A Case of U" - Prince
- "Breathe" - Prince
- "Madrid 2 Chicago" - Prince
- "Anotherloverholenyohead (Live)" - Prince and the Revolution
- "Face Down (Per4mance)" - Prince and the NPG
- "U're Gonna C Me" - Prince¤
- "Here On Earth" - Prince¤
- "One Nite Alone" - Prince¤

==== Video ====
- "Anotherloverholenyohead (Live)" - Prince and the Revolution
- "Face Down (Per4mance)" - Prince and the NPG
- "Prince - Musical Portrait"¤

=== March ===
- "Silicon" - Prince

=== July ===
- "1+1+1=3 (Live)" - Prince and the NPG

== 2003 ==
=== January ===
- Xpectation
- C-Note

=== April (Relaunch) ===
During the relaunch, no downloads were given. Any new music was streamed online.

== 2004 ==
=== March ===
- "Bataclan"
- "Controversy (Live in Hawaii)"
- The Slaughterhouse
- The Chocolate Invasion

=== April ===
- "Magnificent"
- "Reflection (Live)" (Video)

=== July ===
- "The United States of Division"
- "Silver Tongue (Demo)"

=== September ===
- "Musicology (Live, Much Music)" (Video)
- "Kiss (Live, Much Music)" (Video)
- "D.M.S.R. (Live, Much Music)" (Video)

=== October ===
- "San Jose Jam (Live)"
- "Glass Cutter (Demo)"

== 2005 ==
=== March ===
- Live from Paisley Park
- "Strange Relationship (Live)"
- "Satisfied (Live)"

=== April ===
- "Glasscutter"

=== September ===
- S.S.T. single
