= Live at the Aladdin Las Vegas =

- Directed by: Sanaa Hamri
- Written by: Prince
- Produced by: NPG Music Club
- Starring: Prince; Rhonda Smith; John Blackwell; Renato Neto; Greg Boyer; Eric Leeds; Nikka Costa; Maceo Parker; Sheila E.
- Music by: Prince
- Distributed by: Hip-O Records
- Release date: August 19, 2003
- Running time: 80 minutes
- Language: English

Live at the Aladdin Las Vegas is a 2003 direct to video film of Prince in concert at the Aladdin Theatre for the Performing Arts. The concert was recorded December 15, 2002, and features several notable cover versions, an unreleased song and touches on some of his rarely performed back catalog of material. Special guests included former band associates, Eric Leeds and Sheila E., funk legends Maceo Parker and Greg Boyer, as well as Nikka Costa. The soundcheck contains an excerpt of "The Rainbow Children" from the album of the same name and "Nagoya" from C-Note. The audio was recorded directly from the mix console of Prince's long time sound engineer, Scottie Baldwin.

== Track listing ==
1. Intro / Soundcheck
2. "Pop Life"
3. "Money Don't Matter 2 Night" / "The Work"
4. "Push and Pull" (with Nikka Costa)
5. "1+1+1=3" (incl. "Love Rollercoaster" / "Housequake")
6. "Strollin'" / "U Want Me" (previously unreleased)
7. "Gotta Broken Heart Again"
8. "Strange Relationship"
9. "Pass the Peas"
10. "Whole Lotta Love"
11. "Family Name"
12. "Take Me with U"
13. "The Everlasting Now"
14. "Sometimes It Snows in April"

bonus clip: "The Ride"

== Band ==
- Rhonda Smith: Bass and vocals
- Renato Neto: Keys and more keys
- John Blackwell: Drums
- Maceo Parker: Alto saxophone
- Eric Leeds: Tenor saxophone
- Greg Boyer: Trombone
- Scottie Baldwin: Audio Engineer

== Special guests ==
- Sheila E.: Percussion and vocals
- Nikka Costa: Vocals
- DJ Dudley D: Turntables
