= C-Note (album) =

Live album by Prince and the New Power Generation
- Released: March 29, 2004
- Recorded: October–November 2002
- Genres: Jazz; funk; instrumental
- Length: 34:03
- Label: NPG
- Producer: Prince

Prince chronology
N·E·W·S (2003)	C-Note (2004)	Musicology (2004)

C-Note is a live album by Prince and the New Power Generation released in 2004 (though all five tracks had been released as separate MP3 files earlier in 2003). Its genre is jazz, with five tracks taken from soundchecks during the One Nite Alone... Tour.

Four of the five tracks are named after the location they were recorded in. The album's title corresponds to the first letters of the words in the track listing: "Copenhagen", "Nagoya", "Osaka", "Tokyo", and "Empty Room".

The entire album was recorded live from the audio console by Prince's concert sound engineer Scottie Baldwin.

The first four tracks are instrumentals, although the fourth features Prince repeating "Tokyo". The fifth track is a live rendition of "Empty Room" (recorded October 25, 2002, in Copenhagen), though the song was written c. August 4, 1985, when it was first recorded. The song is reported to have been written and recorded for Susannah Melvoin after relationship difficulty.

The album is highly experimental and reminiscent of the Madhouse project. It was sold in digital format only on Prince's NPG Music Club. C-Note is jazz-oriented along with quiet storm, jazz-fusion, jazz-funk, and smooth jazz. It is also atmospheric and new age-themed.

== History ==
Prince's then-fan club, the NPG Music Club charged $100 for a membership that had advertised that paying members would receive four exclusive albums. After Prince released One Nite Alone... and the three-disc One Nite Alone... Live!, members who felt deceived sent complaints of Federal Mail Fraud to the Minnesota Attorney General's office and the Better Business Bureau after Prince failed to honor the agreement. Some fans speculated that the albums Xpectation and C-Note (slang for a $100 bill) were his response to being forced to comply to these demands.

== Track listing ==
Original 2003 downloads (as separate tracks)

1. "Copenhagen" – 13:28
  - contains a portion of Miles Davis' "Jean-Pierre"
2. "Nagoya" – 8:54
3. "Osaka" – 5:28
4. "Tokyo" – 5:04
5. "Empty Room" – 4:02

2004 re-release/2015 TIDAL

1. "Copenhagen" – 10:07
  - excises Davis interpolation

== Personnel ==
- Prince – various instruments, vocals on "Empty Room"
- John Blackwell – drums
- Greg Boyer – trombone
- Candy Dulfer – saxophone
- Eric Leeds – tenor saxophone and keyboards
- Renato Neto – keyboards
- Maceo Parker – alto saxophone
- Rhonda Smith – Bass guitar
- Dudley D. – Scratching
- Scottie Baldwin – FOH recording and mix engineer
