= S.S.T. (song) =

- US CD single cover

Single by Prince
- B-side: "Brand New Orleans"
- Released: September 3, 2005
- Recorded: September 2005
- Studio: Paisley Park, Chanhassen, Minnesota, US
- Genre: Folk; soul
- Length: 3:39
- Label: NPG
- Songwriter(s): Prince
- Producer(s): Prince

Prince singles chronology
"Cinnamon Girl" (2004)	"S.S.T." (2005)	"Te Amo Corazón" (2005)

"S.S.T." is a song by American musician Prince which was recorded and released directly after the impact of 2005's Hurricane Katrina. It was officially released as a digital download by the NPG Music Club on September 3, 2005, and reached number one on the iTunes R&B chart. It was later made available as a CD single through commercial outlets. All proceeds from the recording went to hurricane relief.

The song's title alludes to Sade's 1985 song "The Sweetest Taboo", which is namechecked more than once in the lyrics. "S.S.T." also refers to sea surface temperature, which is used to monitor the threat of hurricanes.

The B-side of the single is the instrumental "Brand New Orleans".

== Charts ==
Chart performance for "S.S.T."
Chart (2005)	Peak position
US Billboard Bubbling Under Hot 100 Singles	11
US Billboard Hot 100 Singles Sales	8
US Billboard Hot R&B/Hip-Hop Singles Sales	22
US Billboard Pop 100	67
US Billboard Hot Digital Songs	56
