= Supercute =

Single by Prince

from the album The Chocolate Invasion
- B-side: "Underneath the Cream"
- Released: April 14, 2001
- Recorded: Spring–August 2000
- Studio: Paisley Park, Chanhassen, Minnesota, U.S.
- Genre: Pop
- Length: 4:18
- Label: NPG
- Songwriter(s): Prince
- Producer(s): Prince

Prince singles chronology
"U Make My Sun Shine" (2001)	"Supercute" (2001)	"The Work, pt. 1" (2001)

"Supercute" is a song by Prince, released as a CD single sold only during his 2001 U.S. tour. The cover art for the single features then backing singer and dancer, Geneva. The song was reportedly one of the tracks from the cancelled High album. The B-side, "Underneath the Cream" was also from the High sessions.
