= N.E.W.S. (Prince album) =

Studio album by Prince
- Released: June 30, 2003
- Recorded: February 6, 2003
- Studio: Paisley Park, Chanhassen
- Genre: New age; jazz-funk
- Length: 56:00
- Label: NPG
- Producer: Prince

Prince chronology
Xpectation (2003)	N.E.W.S. (2003)	C-Note (2004)

Alternative cover
- The foldout "ninja star" opposite side of the artwork.

N.E.W.S. is the twenty-seventh studio album by American recording artist Prince. It was released on June 30, 2003, by NPG Records. The album is the second instrumental album released under Prince's own name, containing four tracks of 14 minutes duration each. Recorded at Prince's Paisley Park Studios over a single day, the album was initially available through Prince's NPG Music Club website on June 30, 2003, before becoming widely commercially available on July 29. The album can be seen as a modern incarnation of Madhouse, but this time as a Prince release. Original Madhouse member Eric Leeds lends his talents, as well as The New Power Generation members John Blackwell, Rhonda Smith and Renato Neto. The album was recorded improvisationally.

The album is the lowest-selling Prince album released to date, with just 30,000 copies sold, but it did become a top-ten hit on the Billboard Internet sales chart, and garnered a Grammy nomination for Best Pop Instrumental Album. The album artwork folded out into a ninja star. Produced by Prince, the album is credited as "Directed By Prince".

The track "West" was included on the 2018 compilation Anthology: 1995–2010.

== Style and composition ==
The album is fully instrumental and has been described as being new age and jazz-funk.

== Reception ==
Professional ratings
Review scores
Source	Rating
AllMusic	2/5 stars
City Pages	0.5/5 stars
The Guardian	2/5 stars
Jazz Times	(favorable)
Wilson & Alroy	1.5/5 stars

The album received mostly negative reviews from critics, with several critics noting the album's lack of cohesion.

In a 2 out of 5 star review, Allmusic reviewer William Ruhlman criticized the album as directionless, stating "The listener, who will have to be a particularly rabid aficionado of all things Prince to be interested, must throw out all expectations and simply revel in the joy of hearing the musician and his cohorts experiment with relaxed musical textures for 56 minutes. Of course, no one else needs to bother." In a positive review for Jazz Times Lucy Tauss summarized "exploratory and evocative, N.E.W.S. is an intriguing departure for this enigmatic and unpredictable artist."

The Guardian ranked the album last out of Prince's 37 studio albums. Stereogum ranked it 20th out of 30 main Prince albums released by 2014, stating "there's no pretending that this isn't for the diehards primarily, or that it's even a coherent collection, but it's great to see a man with so many ideas let some new ones loose."

In a 2014 feature which ranked all Prince albums to date, American magazine Metro Weekly rated it as #36 out of 38 Prince albums, calling it "a 56-minute exercise in tedium", with only Xpectation (2003) and Kamasutra (1998) placed behind.

== Track listing ==
All tracks are written by Prince.

N.E.W.S. track listing
No.	Title	Length
1.	"North"	14:00
2.	"East"	14:00
3.	"West"	14:00
4.	"South"	14:00
Total length:		56:00

== Personnel ==
Band

- Prince – electric guitar, Fender Rhodes, digital keyboards and percussion, production, mixing, art design
- Eric Leeds – tenor and baritone saxophone
- John Blackwell – drums
- Renato Neto – piano and synthesizers
- Rhonda Smith – electric and acoustic bass

Design

- Jeremy Gavin – art design

Production

- Jess Sutcliffe – engineer
- Joseph Lepinski – musical technician
- Takumi – musical technician

== Charts ==
Chart performance for N.E.W.S.
Chart (2003)	Peak position
Dutch Albums (Album Top 100)	83
German Albums (Offizielle Top 100)	93
US Top Internet Albums (Billboard)	8
