= Cbabi Bayoc =

American artist

- Born: Clifford Miskell Jr.
- Education: Grambling State University
- Children: 3
- Website: cbabibayoc.com

Cbabi Bayoc is an American visual artist and illustrator based in St. Louis, Missouri. He is a painter whose work centers on African American history and families.

== Personal life and education ==
Bayoc was born Clifford Miskell Jr. and grew up in O'Fallon, Illinois. He adopted the first name Cbabi in 1997, with Cbabi being an acronym standing for "Creative Black Artist Battling Ignorance". After marrying his wife, Reine, the couple adopted the surname Bayoc, an acronym for "Blessed African Youth of Creativity". The couple have three children and have since divorced. Bayoc and Reis previously co-owned a cafe and bakery.

Bayoc earned a BA in Liberal Arts from Grambling State University in 1995 after transferring from Southwestern Illinois College.

== Career ==
Bayoc learned illustration while working as a caricaturist at Six Flags. Early in his creative career, he studied works by German artist Sebastian Krüger, African-American painters Ernie Barnes and Kadir Nelson, and Mexican muralist Diego Rivera. He later became an illustrator for the magazine Rap Pages.

Bayoc, among other local artists, loaned artwork for Prince's stop in St. Louis during his Love 4 One Another tour. Prince decided to purchase three of Bayoc's works, including a painting that was used as the cover art for his 2001 album, The Rainbow Children. Prince would later purchase two more paintings from Bayoc.

In 2012, Bayoc initiated a project on Black fatherhood resulting in 365 paintings inspired by community contributions. In 2020, Bayoc was commissioned on a portrait of Henry Townsend for the St. Louis Blues Society pandemic relief fund.

Bayoc has also done large murals in the St. Louis metropolitan area, including a 1,000 square foot retaining wall near World Wide Technology Raceway in East St. Louis, a mural in Midtown St. Louis commemorating Mill Creek Valley, and multiple murals on the former Greyhound bus station in north St. Louis. He has also painted murals at schools in Missouri, including Parkview High School in Springfield. In 2022, he designed a stained glass window depicting a Black Jesus and Mary Magdalene for the Episcopal Church of the Holy Communion in University City, Missouri. In 2023, Bayoc and wife Amber Howlett Bayoc painted a mural for Foot Soldiers Park in Selma, Alabama celebrating the Voting Rights Movement.

In 2026, Bayoc, St. Louis Public Radio, The Marshall Project - St. Louis were awarded a National Murrow Award for their collaboration Remember Me, a multimedia project memorializing homicide victims and the lasting impacts on their families.

Bayoc has variously described himself as Cubist and abstract.

=== Illustration work ===
- Kendi, Ibram X. (2022). Goodnight Racism.
