= The Work, pt. 1 =

- NPG CD single

Single by Prince

from the album The Rainbow Children
- B-side: "U Make My Sun Shine"
- Released: 2001
- Recorded: February 2001
- Studio: Paisley Park, Chanhassen, Minnesota, US
- Genre: Funk
- Length: 3:39
- Label: NPG
- Songwriter(s): Prince
- Producer(s): Prince

Prince singles chronology
"Supercute" (2001)	"The Work, pt. 1" (2001)	"Days of Wild" (2002)

"The Work, pt. 1" is a song written by Prince in 2001 and the debut single for his album The Rainbow Children. The song is an homage to James Brown in both the delivery and title (Brown was known to release songs in multiple parts). The track features Prince performing in falsetto and backing vocals by Kip Blackshire and girl group Milenia.

The lyrics of "The Work, pt. 1" speak of inequality and battles racism, which is the overall theme of The Rainbow Children. Some have also theorized the song is about spreading the news of the Jehovah's Witnesses, due to a spoken passage that directly precedes the song on the album. This would also explain the "pt. 1", implying that this is only the first part of the endless "work" to be done.

"The Work, pt. 1" was originally released as a downloadable single via Napster, during the height of its legal troubles. This was one of many innovative distribution methods Prince has used for his music. The song was also released on CD as a single, and later on The Rainbow Children. The downloadable single contains a section with some different lyrics and instrumentation than the later CD single and album versions. There has been no "part 2" released to date, although the title track to the 2004 album Musicology bears a strong resemblance and some fans have dubbed it "The Work, pt 2". The B-side on the CD single was the previously released "U Make My Sun Shine".
