= One Nite Alone... Live! =

Live album by Prince and The New Power Generation
- Released: November 26, 2002
- Recorded: March 11, 2002 – Indianapolis Murat Theatre); March 29–30, 2002 – Washington DC Warner Theatre; April 6 – Lakeland Lakeland Center – Youkey Theatre (credited in booklet as April 4); April 9 – New York Avery Fisher Hall; April 14 – Houston Verizon Theatre; April 19–20 – Los Angeles Kodak Theatre; April 24 – Oakland Paramount Theatre; April 29 – Seattle Paramount Theatre; April 30, 2002 – Portland Arlene Schnitzer Concert Hall
- Genre: Pop; rock; funk; jazz
- Length: 181:21
- Label: NPG
- Producer: Prince

Prince chronology
One Nite Alone... (2002)	One Nite Alone... Live! (2002)	Xpectation (2003)

Professional ratings
Review scores
Source	Rating
The Rolling Stone Album Guide	2.5/5 stars

One Nite Alone... Live! is a live album box set by Prince and The New Power Generation, containing live recordings from the intimate One Nite Alone... Tour performances. The album was released in 2002 but many of the tracks were new arrangements of songs dating from more than 20 years earlier. It was the first album since the Love Symbol Album in 1992 to be credited to Prince and The New Power Generation. Among the album's highlights are "Sometimes It Snows in April" and "Adore" at the piano, an extended "Anna Stesia", and an energetic "When U Were Mine".

== Overview ==
Prince's backing musicians included Sheila E., Maceo Parker, Eric Leeds, Candy Dulfer, Greg Boyer, Renato Neto, John Blackwell and Rhonda Smith. The entire album was recorded live from the audio console by Prince's concert sound engineer Scottie Baldwin. Baldwin's essay on the recording process is included in the liner notes.

One Nite Alone... Live! is the first official live album of Prince's concerts and includes tracks from nine different shows from eight venues on the One Nite Alone... Tour. The track list is fairly representative of a typical night's show on the tour, although it misses the cover versions performed regularly on the tour (such as "A Case of You", "Love Rollercoaster", "La-La Means I Love You" and "Sing a Simple Song"), leaving only Prince compositions. The first two CDs contain the main act, the third CD the aftershow.

The album artwork was the first full work by Sam Jennings for Prince.

On May 29, 2020 the album was reissued as Up All Nite with Prince: The One Nite Alone Collection, a 4CD + DVD box set including the original three CDs, the studio album One Nite Alone... and the DVD Live at the Aladdin Las Vegas.

== Track listing ==
=== Disc 1: Main Act, Part 1 ===
1. "Rainbow Children" (Washington D.C., March 31, 2002) – 11:46
2. "Muse 2 the Pharaoh" (Indianapolis, March 11, 2002) – 4:49
3. "Xenophobia" (Portland, April 30, 2002) – 12:40
4. "Extraordinary" (Portland, April 30, 2002) – 5:02
5. "Mellow" (Indianapolis, March 11, 2002) – 4:30
6. "1+1+1 Is 3" (Lakeland, April 6, 2002) – 6:05
7. "The Other Side of the Pillow" (Indianapolis, March 11, 2002) – 4:46
8. "Strange Relationship" (Indianapolis, March 11, 2002) – 4:13
9. "When U Were Mine" (Los Angeles, April 20, 2002) – 3:47
10. "Avalanche" (Portland, April 30, 2002) – 6:04

=== Disc 2: Main Act, Part 2 ===
1. "Family Name" (Portland, April 30, 2002) – 7:17
2. "Take Me with U" (Oakland, April 24, 2002) – 2:54
3. "Raspberry Beret" (Portland, April 30, 2002) – 3:26
4. "Everlasting Now" (Portland, April 30, 2002) – 7:41
5. "One Nite Alone..." (Seattle, April 29, 2002) – 1:12
6. "Adore" (Houston, April 14, 2002) – 5:33
7. "I Wanna B Ur Lover" (Portland, April 30, 2002) – 1:22
8. "Do Me, Baby" (Houston, April 14, 2002) – 1:56
9. "Condition of the Heart (Interlude)" (Houston, April 14, 2002) – 0:39
10. "Diamonds and Pearls" (Portland, April 30, 2002) – 0:41
11. "The Beautiful Ones" (Portland, April 30, 2002) – 2:10
12. "Nothing Compares 2 U" (Portland, April 30, 2002) – 3:48
13. "Free" (Seattle, April 29, 2002) – 1:06
14. "Starfish and Coffee" (Seattle, April 29, 2002) – 1:07
15. "Sometimes It Snows in April" (Seattle, April 29, 2002) – 2:41
16. "How Come U Don't Call Me Anymore?" (Portland, April 30, 2002) – 5:07
17. "Anna Stesia" (Los Angeles, April 19, 2002) – 13:12

=== Disc 3: The Aftershow: It Ain't Over! ===
1. "Joy in Repetition" – 10:56
2. "We Do This" – 4:42
3. Medley: "Just Friends (Sunny)"/"If You Want Me to Stay" – 4:26
4. "2 Nigs United 4 West Compton" – 6:15
5. "Alphabet Street" – 2:55
6. "Peach [Xtended Jam]" – 11:19
7. "Dorothy Parker" – 6:17
8. "Girls & Boys" – 6:59
9. "Everlasting Now (Vamp)" – 1:49

== Charts ==
Chart performance for One Nite Alone... Live!
Chart (2020)	Peak position
Belgian Albums (Ultratop Wallonia)	144
French Albums (SNEP)	184
German Albums (Offizielle Top 100)	58
Swiss Albums (Schweizer Hitparade)	36
US Top Album Sales (Billboard)	95

Chart performance for Up All Nite with Prince: The One Nite Alone Collection
Chart (2020)	Peak position
Belgian Albums (Ultratop Flanders)	53
Belgian Albums (Ultratop Wallonia)	98
Dutch Albums (Album Top 100)	38
French Albums (SNEP)	114
German Albums (Offizielle Top 100)	30
Scottish Albums (OCC)	19
Swiss Albums (Schweizer Hitparade)	61
US Top Album Sales (Billboard)	19
