= U Make My Sun Shine =

Single by Prince and Angie Stone

from the album The Chocolate Invasion
- B-side: "When Will We B Paid?"
- Released: April 10, 2001
- Recorded: June 2000
- Studio: Paisley Park, Chanhassen, Minnesota, US
- Genre: Southern soul; gospel; R&B
- Length: 5:52 (single/original version); 7:05 (full length version)
- Label: NPG
- Songwriter: Prince
- Producer: Prince

Prince singles chronology
"The Greatest Romance Ever Sold" (1999)	"U Make My Sun Shine" (2001)	"Supercute" (2001)

Angie Stone singles chronology
"Everyday" (2000)	"U Make My Sun Shine" (2001)	"Brotha" (2001)

"U Make My Sun Shine" is a song by Prince, released on April 10, 2001. The ballad is a duet with guest vocalist Angie Stone, and along with the B-side was reportedly one of the tracks from Prince's canceled High album.

"When Will We B Paid?" is a cover version of the 1969 song by the Staple Singers, originally titled "When Will We Be Paid". While the Staple Singers' version is somewhat upbeat musically, Prince's take is a sparse number with lyrics delivered with sadness and anger. The music is almost dirge-like, but features a searing guitar solo to further emphasize the anger. The song concerns the mistreatment and lack of appreciation for black people in the United States. Prince performed the song during his 2001 Hit n Run Tour, segueing it from "Purple Rain".

== Music video ==
Prince and Angie Stone, as well as some other NPG members at the time, can be seen singing against a blue, partly cloudy background.

== Charts ==
Chart performance for "U Make My Sun Shine"
Chart (2001)	Peak position
US Billboard Hot 100 Singles Sales	59
US Billboard Bubbling Under R&B/Hip-Hop Singles	8
