= Piano and a Microphone 1983 =

Demo album by Prince
- Released: September 21, 2018
- Recorded: Late summer or Autumn 1983
- Studio: Kiowa Trail home studio (Chanhassen, Minnesota)
- Length: 34:21
- Label: NPG; Warner Bros.

Prince chronology
Anthology: 1995–2010 (2018)	Piano and a Microphone 1983 (2018)	Originals (2019)

Professional ratings
Aggregate scores
Source	Rating
Metacritic	83/100
Review scores
Source	Rating
AllMusic	4/5 stars
The A.V. Club	B
The Guardian	4/5 stars
Pitchfork	8.5/10
Rolling Stone	4/5 stars

Piano and a Microphone 1983 is a posthumously released demo album by American musician Prince, released on CD, vinyl, and digital formats on September 21, 2018. It is the first album released by the Prince estate consisting solely of material from his archive, the Vault.

== Background ==
The album was discovered as a single cassette tape in Prince's vault at Paisley Park. The music was recorded in one take in 1983 at Prince's Kiowa Trail home studio in Chanhassen, Minnesota. The session is nearly 35 minutes of Prince's vocals while he played piano and segued between songs.

The session includes alternative versions of previously released and yet-to-be released songs, cover versions, and sketches of songs. Four of the album's nine tracks were previously unreleased – "Mary Don't You Weep", "Wednesday" (originally recorded by Jill Jones for a deleted scene in Purple Rain), "Cold Coffee & Cocaine", and "Why the Butterflies".

== Critical reception ==
The New York Times called the album "a glimpse of a notoriously private artist doing his mysterious work" while Adam Mattera in Echoes cited "Mary Don't You Weep" as "a telling choice that points both to his political awareness and gospel heritage – not something people would have expected from a 25 year-old more famous at the time for his flasher mac, high heels and songs about incestuous siblings and used condoms".

== Track listing ==
All tracks are written by Prince, except where noted.

No.	Title	Writer(s)	Length
1.	"17 Days"	Prince; Lisa Coleman; Matthew Fink; Wendy Melvoin	6:23
2.	"Purple Rain"		1:27
3.	"A Case of You"	Joni Mitchell	1:41
4.	"Mary Don't You Weep"	Traditional, arranged by Prince	4:42
5.	"Strange Relationship"		2:39
6.	"International Lover"		3:49
7.	"Wednesday"		2:00
8.	"Cold Coffee & Cocaine"		5:13
9.	"Why the Butterflies"		6:27
Total length:			34:21

Notes

- Track listing adapted from Entertainment Weekly.
- Tracks 1 through 7 (which constitute Side A of the vinyl edition) are presented as a continuous medley, as they were originally recorded.
- "International Lover" contains an uncredited medley performance of "Do Me, Baby".

== Charts ==
=== Weekly charts ===
Weekly chart performance for Piano and a Microphone 1983
Chart (2018)	Peak position
Australian Albums (ARIA)	33
Austrian Albums (Ö3 Austria)	10
Belgian Albums (Ultratop Flanders)	4
Belgian Albums (Ultratop Wallonia)	23
Canadian Albums (Billboard)	87
Danish Albums (Hitlisten)	33
French Albums (SNEP)	20
Dutch Albums (Album Top 100)	5
German Albums (Offizielle Top 100)	12
Hungarian Albums (MAHASZ)	10
Irish Albums (IRMA)	34
Italian Albums (FIMI)	39
Japanese Hot Albums (Billboard Japan)	42
Japanese Albums (Oricon)	24
Norwegian Albums (VG-lista)	18
Portuguese Albums (AFP)	3
Scottish Albums (OCC)	11
Spanish Albums (Promusicae)	8
Swedish Albums (Sverigetopplistan)	12
Swiss Albums (Schweizer Hitparade)	6
UK Albums (OCC)	12
US Billboard 200	11
US Top R&B/Hip-Hop Albums (Billboard)	7

=== Year-end charts ===
Year-end chart performance for Piano and a Microphone 1983
Chart (2018)	Position
Belgian Albums (Ultratop Flanders)	163
