= St. Louis Blues Society =

Organization for blues music in Missouri, US

- Formation: 1984
- Type: Music Society
- Headquarters: St. Louis, Missouri
- Region served: United States
- Affiliations: Blues Foundation
- Website: http://www.stlouisbluessociety.org/home

The St Louis Blues Society is an organization that preserves and fosters blues music in St. Louis, Missouri, the city being one of the historic cradles of the blues. It has been in operation since 1984. The society funds local musicians, concerts, and educational events as well as features articles on such initiatives in their bi-monthly magazine, the Bluesletter. The organization is governed by officers and a board of directors, which includes the son of legendary blues artist, Henry Townsend.

== Initiatives ==
The St. Louis Blues Society has three funds they created. This includes The Mission Fund, The Archive Project, and the Alvin Jett Blues Education Initiative.

=== The Mission Fund ===
The Mission Fund was created to support Blues and R&B musicians in times of need including health issues or unforeseen problems. This fund was especially beneficial during the COVID-19 pandemic, where the St. Louis Blues Society gave over $90,000 to support artists.

=== Archive Project ===
St. Louis is one of the richest cities in the United States in terms of music history, and the Archive Project works with other publication companies to preserve the music and artists from this region. The end goal of this project is to create a central repository that houses both physical and digital content.

=== Alvin Jett Blues Education Initiative ===
The Alvin Jett Blues Education Initiative focuses on educating people about the music and artists of St. Louis. This is meant to highlight the talent that St. Louis has produced, share the legacy of the blues in the city, and inspire new artists to emerge. Its namesake, Alvin Jett, is a St. Louis Blues musician who regularly donated to the St. Louis Blues Society. This initiative is also funded by the Atomic Blues Festivals held by the society.

=== Preliminary International Blues Challenge rounds ===
The Road to Memphis is a regional preliminary International Blues Challenge competition hosted by the St. Louis Blues Society. Road to Memphis crowns a Solo/Duo Act and a Band Act champion, both of which represent St. Louis at the International Blues Challenge in Memphis, Tennessee.

== Albums ==
According to its website, the St. Louis Blues Society has produced six annual compilation CDs and one CD of an archive project featuring two local musicians. Each album can be purchased online and is available to stream on Spotify and Amazon Music.

Albums
Title	Year	Notes
St. Louis Blues Society Presents: 14 in '14	2015	
St. Louis Blues Society Presents: 15 in '15	2016	
St Louis Blues Society Presents: 16 in '16	2017	Most played album on KDHX FM in 2017
St. Louis Blues Society Presents: 17 in '17	2018	Most played album on KDHX FM in 2018
St. Louis Blues Society Presents: 18 in '18	2019	Dedicated to St. Louis native DJ Gabriel
St. Louis Blues Society Presents: 19 in '19	2020	
The St. Louis Blues Society Archive Project Presents: Leroy Pierson and Tom Hall Live at the Schlafly Tap Room Bluesfest 1993	2024	Instead of featuring a wide array of artists, this work features two St. Louis steel guitar players
The St. Louis Kings of Rhythm 1986 European Tour Showcase recorded in the Netherlands	2026 (unreleased)	
