= Rave In2 the Joy Fantastic =

Remix album by Prince
- Released: April 30, 2001
- Studios: Paisley Park, Chanhassen, Minnesota; Electric Lady, New York City, New York; O'Henry Sound, Burbank, California
- Length: 64:09
- Label: NPG
- Producer: Prince

Prince chronology
Rave Un2 the Joy Fantastic (1999)	Rave In2 the Joy Fantastic (2001)	The Very Best of Prince (2001)

Rave In2 the Joy Fantastic is a remix album by American recording artist Prince, under the unpronounceable "Love Symbol", as shown on the album cover. It was released on April 29, 2001 by NPG Records and contains remixes of songs found on Prince's twenty-third studio album, Rave Un2 the Joy Fantastic (1999). It was issued via mail exclusively through the NPG Music Club, an internet subscription service; due to this circumstance, the album was not able to chart.

The album is an alternative version of Rave Un2 the Joy Fantastic, containing 13 of the album's tracks, plus a previously unreleased track entitled "Beautiful Strange". Besides remixes of the mentioned tracks, Rave In2 the Joy Fantastic also contains several extended songs, plus a trimmed version of "Wherever U Go, Whatever U Do". The album also does not contain "Segue" tracks, that were used several times in the previous album.

== Background and release ==
Rave In2 the Joy Fantastic is an alternative version of Prince's 1999 studio album Rave Un2 the Joy Fantastic. Unlike Prince's previous efforts, the album was not released commercially. Instead, an internet subscription service co-founded by Prince, NPG Music Club, issued the album via mail. Due to this, Rave In2 the Joy Fantastic also was not able to chart anywhere. Recording sessions for the parent album took place in Prince's hometown of Chanhassen, Minnesota, at Paisley Park Studios, plus at Electric Lady Studios in California and O'Henry Sound Studios in New York City.

The album was released as a limited edition CD on April 30, 2001, exclusively through the NPG Music Club. Since then, the album was out of print and had been unavailable for purchase until 2019. It was made available through streaming platforms including Spotify and Apple Music on August 17, 2018 alongside most of Prince's albums between 1995 and 2010.

== Ultimate Rave ==
In April 2019, Rave In2 the Joy Fantastic was released posthumously as part of the special edition box set Ultimate Rave which also contains the original album Rave Un2 the Joy Fantastic and the concert DVD Rave Un2 the Year 2000. The box set charted in the Netherlands.

== Composition ==
Almost the entire album consists of songs from Rave Un2 the Joy Fantastic, minus "Beautiful Strange", which was a previously unreleased recording. Unlike the former album, Rave In2 the Joy Fantastic does not include any "Segue" tracks. The album opens with "Rave In2 the Joy Fantastic", similar to the opening song on the parent album. "The Greatest Romance Ever Sold" also includes a verse from Eve, along with an additional three minutes of production; the album's fourth song is the Nasty Girl remix of "Hot Wit' U", however, this version does not include the Eve verse.

An extended version of "Tangerine" is included, followed by "So Far, So Pleased", a duet with Gwen Stefani. The aforementioned track and "The Sun, the Moon and Stars" both appear in their untouched versions on the album. A remix of promotional single "Man'O'War" is the eighth recording, immediately followed by a lengthier version of other promotional single "Baby Knows" featuring Sheryl Crow. "I Love U, but I Don't Trust U Anymore" is also the original version of the track from Rave Un2, and includes a verse from folk rock singer Ani DiFranco, who plays an acoustic guitar.

The album's eleventh song is the previously unreleased "Beautiful Strange", which was later used as the name of a DVD released by Prince in 2010. The following recording is "Silly Game", which is the album's final untouched song. Alternative versions of "Wherever U Go, Whatever U Do" and "Prettyman" close the album, with the latter being a hidden track.

== Track listing ==
All tracks are written by Prince.

Rave In2 the Joy Fantastic track listing
No.	Title	Length
1.	"Rave In2 the Joy Fantastic"	5:13
2.	"Undisputed" (The Moneyapolis Mix; featuring Chuck D)	5:45
3.	"The Greatest Romance Ever Sold" (extended remix; featuring Eve)	8:07
4.	"Hot Wit' U" (Nasty Girl Remix)	4:22
5.	"Tangerine" (extended version)	2:13
6.	"So Far, So Pleased" (featuring Gwen Stefani)	3:23
7.	"The Sun, the Moon and Stars"	5:15
8.	"Man'O'War" (Remix)	5:12
9.	"Baby Knows" (extended version; featuring Sheryl Crow)	3:52
10.	" Love U, but Don't Trust U Anymore" (featuring Ani DiFranco)	3:33
11.	"Beautiful Strange"	4:55
12.	"Silly Game"	3:29
13.	"Wherever U Go, Whatever U Do" (alternative version)	3:15
14.	"Prettyman" (extended version; hidden track)	5:35
Total length:		64:09

== Personnel ==
Credits adapted from the album's liner notes.

- Prince – all other vocals and instruments
- Mike Scott – guitar
- Ani DiFranco – acoustic guitar
- Rhonda Smith – acoustic bass, bass
- Kirk Johnson – drums, percussion
- Michael B. – drums
- Kenni Holmen – saxophone
- Kathy Jensen – saxophone
- Maceo Parker – saxophone
- Steve Strand – trumpet
- Dave Jensen – trumpet
- Michael B. Nelson – trombone
- Gwen Stefani – co-lead vocals
- Sheryl Crow – co-lead vocals and harmonica
- Marva King – backing vocals
- Larry Graham – backing vocals
- DuJuan Blackshire – backing vocals
- Johnnie Blackshire – backing vocals
- Kip Blackshire – vocoder vocals
- Chuck D – vocals
- Eve – vocals
- Bros. Jules – scratches
- Clare Fischer – orchestration

== Charts ==
Chart performance for Rave In2 the Joy Fantastic
Chart (2019)	Peak position
Belgian Albums (Ultratop Flanders)	91

== Release history ==
Release history for Rave In2 the Joy Fantastic
Region	Date	Format	Label	Ref.
United States	April 30, 2001	CD	NPG	
