= The Very Best of Prince =

Greatest hits album by Prince
- Released: July 31, 2001
- Length: 73:18
- Label: Warner Bros.
- Producers: Prince; The Revolution; The New Power Generation

Prince chronology
Rave In2 the Joy Fantastic (2001)	The Very Best of Prince (2001)	The Rainbow Children (2001)

Digital cover

Professional ratings
Review scores
Source	Rating
AllMusic	5/5 stars
Encyclopedia of Popular Music	5/5 stars
Q	4/5 stars
The Rolling Stone Album Guide	4/5 stars

The Very Best of Prince is a greatest hits album by American recording artist Prince. It was released on July 31, 2001, by Warner Bros. Records. The album contains most of his commercially successful singles from 1979 to 1991 including the US number 1s "When Doves Cry", "Let's Go Crazy", "Kiss" and "Cream".

The Very Best of Prince does not include the US number 1 hit "Batdance" most likely due to the licensing of the character Batman. Music critic Stephen Thomas Erlewine believed that the Batman album was unofficially being written out of Prince's discography. All the songs included in this compilation were all previously included in the 3-disc box set The Hits/The B-Sides (1993), with the exception of "Money Don't Matter 2 Night".

== Commercial performance ==
On the chart dated August 18, 2001, The Very Best of Prince debuted at number 66 on the US Billboard 200. As of September 21, 2004, the album was certified platinum by the Recording Industry Association of America (RIAA) for selling 1 million copies in the United States.

The Very Best of Prince sold 179,000 album-equivalent units (100,000 in pure album sales) in the week following Prince's death in April 2016, thus allowing the album to re-enter the Billboard 200 at number one on the chart dating May 7, 2016; this makes the album Prince's fifth number-one on the chart. The following week the album fell to number two on the Billboard 200 chart, selling 391,000 equivalent copies (216,000 in pure album sales) behind Beyoncé's Lemonade. In 2016 alone, the album sold 660,000 recognized copies in the United States in addition to the over 2 million copies sold prior to 2016.

== Track listing ==
All songs are written by and credited to Prince, except where noted.

The Very Best of Prince track listing
No.	Title	Writer(s)	Original album	Length
1.	"I Wanna Be Your Lover" (single edit)		Prince (1979)	2:58
2.	"1999" (single edit; credited to Prince & the Revolution)		1999 (1982)	3:37
3.	"Little Red Corvette" (credited to Prince & The Revolution)		1999	4:56
4.	"When Doves Cry" (single edit; credited to Prince & the Revolution)		Purple Rain (1984)	3:47
5.	"Let's Go Crazy" (credited to Prince & the Revolution)		Purple Rain	4:40
6.	"Purple Rain" (credited to Prince & the Revolution)		Purple Rain	8:40
7.	"I Would Die 4 U" (single version; credited to Prince & the Revolution)		Purple Rain	2:56
8.	"Raspberry Beret" (credited to Prince & the Revolution)		Around the World in a Day (1985)	3:32
9.	"Kiss" (single edit; credited to Prince & the Revolution)	Prince, arr. by David Z	Parade (1986)	3:46
10.	"Sign o' the Times" (single edit)		Sign o' the Times (1987)	3:42
11.	"U Got the Look" (featuring Sheena Easton)		Sign o' the Times	3:47
12.	"Alphabet St."		Lovesexy (1988)	5:38
13.	"Thieves in the Temple"		Graffiti Bridge (1990)	3:21
14.	"Gett Off" (credited to Prince and The New Power Generation)		Diamonds and Pearls (1991)	4:31
15.	"Cream" (credited to Prince and the New Power Generation)		Diamonds and Pearls	4:13
16.	"Diamonds and Pearls" (single edit; credited to Prince and the New Power Generation)		Diamonds and Pearls	4:19
17.	"Money Don't Matter 2 Night" (credited to Prince and the New Power Generation)	Prince; Rosie Gaines	Diamonds and Pearls	4:47

== Personnel ==
- Prince – lead vocals and various instruments

=== The Revolution ===
- Lisa Coleman – keyboards, vocals
- Wendy Melvoin – guitar, vocals
- Bobby Z. – drums, percussion
- Brown Mark – bass guitar, vocals
- Matt (Dr.) Fink – keyboards, vocals

=== The New Power Generation ===
- Levi Seacer Jr. – rhythm guitar, backing vocals
- Tony M. – rapping, backing vocals
- Tommy Barbarella – "PurpleAxxe" sampling, keyboards
- Kirk Johnson – percussion, backing vocals
- Damon Dickson – percussion, backing vocals
- Sonny T. – bass, backing vocals
- Michael B. – drums
- Rosie Gaines – vocals, "PurpleAxxe" sampling, organ

=== Additional musicians ===
- Jill Jones – co-lead vocals (on "1999")
- Dez Dickerson – co-lead vocals (on "1999" & "Little Red Corvette"), lead guitar (on "Little Red Corvette")
- Mazarati – backing vocals (on "Kiss")
- Sheena Easton – vocals (on "U Got the Look")
- Sheila E. – drums, percussion (on "U Got the Look" & "Alphabet St."), vocals (on "Alphabet St.")
- Cat Glover – rap (on "Alphabet St.")
- Eric Leeds – brass, vocals (on "Alphabet St."), flute (on "Gett Off")

== Charts ==
=== Weekly charts ===
Weekly chart performance for The Very Best of Prince
Chart (2001)	Peak position
Australian Albums (ARIA)	40
Austrian Albums (Ö3 Austria)	13
Belgian Albums (Ultratop Flanders)	18
Dutch Albums (Album Top 100)	3
German Albums (Offizielle Top 100)	6
Irish Albums (IRMA)	1
Spanish Albums (AFYVE)	18
Swedish Albums (Sverigetopplistan)	28
Swiss Albums (Schweizer Hitparade)	17
UK Albums (Official Charts)	2
US Billboard 200	66

2011 weekly chart performance for The Very Best of Prince
Chart (2011)	Peak position
Norwegian Albums (VG-lista)	16

2016 weekly chart performance for The Very Best of Prince
Chart (2016)	Peak position
Australian Albums (ARIA)	2
Austrian Albums (Ö3 Austria)	5
Canadian Albums (Billboard)	1
Danish Albums (Hitlisten)	7
Finnish Albums (Suomen virallinen lista)	12
French Albums (SNEP)	8
German Albums (Offizielle Top 100)	5
Hungarian Albums (MAHASZ)	5
Irish Albums (IRMA)	2
Italian Albums (FIMI)	12
New Zealand Albums (RMNZ)	1
Norwegian Albums (VG-lista)	2
Swedish Albums (Sverigetopplistan)	4
Swiss Albums (Schweizer Hitparade)	1
UK Albums (Official Charts)	2
US Billboard 200	1

=== Monthly charts ===
Monthly chart performance for The Very Best of Prince
Chart (2016)	Peak position
Argentine Monthly Albums (CAPIF)	3

=== Year-end charts ===
2001 year-end chart performance for The Very Best of Prince
Chart (2001)	Position
Canadian R&B Albums (Nielsen SoundScan)	47
Dutch Albums (Album Top 100)	32
UK Albums (OCC)	75

2002 year-end chart performance for The Very Best of Prince
Chart (2002)	Position
Canadian R&B Albums (Nielsen SoundScan)	131

2016 year-end chart performance for The Very Best of Prince
Chart (2016)	Position
Australian Albums (ARIA)	19
New Zealand Albums (RMNZ)	30
Swiss Albums (Schweizer Hitparade)	77
UK Albums (OCC)	42
US Billboard 200	14

== Certifications ==
Certifications for The Very Best of Prince
Region	Certification	Certified units/sales
Australia (ARIA)	2× Platinum	140,000^{^}
Belgium (BRMA)	Platinum	50,000^{*}
Canada (Music Canada)	Gold	50,000^{^}
Germany (BVMI)	Gold	150,000^{‡}
Netherlands (NVPI)	Platinum	80,000^{^}
New Zealand (RMNZ)	Platinum	15,000^{^}
United Kingdom (BPI)	3× Platinum	900,000^{‡}
United States (RIAA)	Platinum	2,660,000
^{*} Sales figures based on certification alone.^{^} Shipments figures based on certification alone.^{‡} Sales+streaming figures based on certification alone.
