= 20Ten =

Studio album by Prince
- Released: July 10, 2010
- Recorded: Early–mid 2006; 2009–early 2010
- Studio: Paisley Park, Chanhassen, Minnesota, US
- Genre: Pop; funk; rock; soul
- Length: 39:18
- Label: NPG
- Producer: Prince

Prince chronology
| Lotusflow3r (2009) | 20Ten (2010) | Plectrumelectrum (2014) |

20Ten is the thirty-fifth studio album by American recording artist Prince. It was released on July 10, 2010, by NPG Records as a free covermount with the Daily Mirror and Daily Record in the UK and Ireland, and Het Nieuwsblad and De Gentenaar in Belgium. It was also released on July 22, 2010, with Rolling Stone magazine in Germany, and Courrier International in France.

The album was produced, arranged, composed, and performed by Prince at Paisley Park Studios in Chanhassen, Minnesota. It is his thirty-third studio album released in the UK. 20Ten contains musical elements of funk, pop, rock, and soul music. Some titles of the tracks from the album were revealed as clues in Prince's song "Cause and Effect" which was released to radio earlier in 2010.

== Release ==
Prince revealed the name of the album when receiving a lifetime achievement award at the 2010 BET Awards in June 2010. He stated to the Daily Mirror that he chose the title because, "I just think it's a year that really matters. These are very trying times." He considered the album a personal diary of the year.

Over 2.5 million copies were distributed by Trinity Mirror, the publisher of the Daily Mirror and Daily Record. Prince was featured in the publications, to which he granted his first interview in a British newspaper in over 10 years. The issue of the Mirror cost 65 pence; the album was not available as a digital download or in retail stores. Prince stated to the Mirror that this method of releasing the album was "the best way to go... no charts, no internet piracy and no stress," although the album is easily available for illegal download via peer-to-peer networks. The publisher released that sales of the Daily Mirror increased by 334,000, and sales of The Daily Record increased by 45,000 copies on the day it included the album.

Prince released his album Planet Earth in July 2007 under a similar arrangement with the British newspaper The Mail on Sunday. No plans for a U.S. release have even been announced.

On October 8, 2010, Prince told French radio station Europe 1 that he was reportedly planning on releasing an updated edition of the album called 20Ten Deluxe.

== Reception ==
Professional ratings
Review scores
| Source | Rating |
|---|---|
| AllMusic | 2.5/5 stars |
| MusicOMH | 2/5 stars |
| NME | 4/10 |

20Ten received mixed reviews from most music critics. Columnist Tony Parsons reviewed the album for the Daily Mirror, the newspaper marketing the album. He wrote that it was "as good as [Prince's] all-time classics like Purple Rain and 1999 " and that it was "his best record since Sign o' the Times 23 years ago." Joachim Hentschel, writing for the German edition of Rolling Stone, viewed the album as Prince's best effort since 1992's the Love Symbol Album. Jason Draper of NME gave 20Ten a 4/10 rating, stating that while it "has its moments", the album was "no way" his best in 23 years, but likely his best in four years. MusicOMH writer Luke Winkie gave it 2 out of 5 stars and described it as "one of the slightest albums the man has ever recorded; fluffy, anti-climatic, and utterly boring". Stephen Thomas Erlewine of Allmusic gave the album 2½ out of 5 stars and wrote that its songs feature "enough of a shape to be attractive from a distance, not enough to withstand closer scrutiny... hooks don’t sink in, funk jams are stuck in low gear, sensuality only simmers, the rhythms are somewhat stiff, and Prince’s deliberate mining of the past only highlights how he’s stripped the freakiness out of his entire persona".

== Track listing ==
All tracks are written by Prince

20Ten track listing
| No. | Title | Length |
|---|---|---|
| 1. | "Compassion" | 3:57 |
| 2. | "Beginning Endlessly" | 5:27 |
| 3. | "Future Soul Song" | 5:08 |
| 4. | "Sticky Like Glue" | 4:46 |
| 5. | "Act of God" | 3:13 |
| 6. | "Lavaux" | 3:03 |
| 7. | "Walk in Sand" | 3:29 |
| 8. | "Sea of Everything" | 3:49 |
| 9. | "Everybody Loves Me" | 4:08 |
| 77. | "Laydown" (hidden track) | 3:07 |

Notes:

- Tracks 10 to 76 contain five to six seconds of silence.

== Personnel ==
- Prince – all vocals and musical performances, except as indicated below
- Liv Warfield – background vocals
- Shelby J – background vocals
- Elisa Dease – background vocals
- Maceo Parker – horns
- Greg Boyer – horns
- Ray Monteiro – horns

== Release history ==
List of release dates, record label and format details
| Country | Date | Format | Publication | Label |
|---|---|---|---|---|
| United Kingdom | July 10, 2010 | CD covermount | Daily Mirror | NPG |
| Scotland | July 10, 2010 | CD covermount | Daily Record | NPG |
| Belgium | July 10, 2010 | CD covermount | Het Nieuwsblad | NPG |
| France | July 22, 2010 | CD covermount | Courrier International | NPG |
| Germany | July 22, 2010 | CD covermount | Rolling Stone | NPG |
