= The Chocolate Invasion =

The Chocolate Invasion (Trax from the NPG Music Club Volume One)

Studio album by Prince
- Released: March 29, 2004
- Recorded: 1999–2001
- Genre: Pop; funk; rock; dance; hip hop
- Length: 49:19
- Label: NPG
- Producer: Prince

Prince chronology
Musicology (2004)	The Chocolate Invasion (Trax from the NPG Music Club Volume One) (2004)	The Slaughterhouse (2004)

Professional ratings
Review scores
Source	Rating
The Guardian	3/5 stars

The Chocolate Invasion (Trax from the NPG Music Club Volume One) is the twenty-ninth studio album by American recording artist Prince. It was released on March 29, 2004 by NPG Records. The album was released as a download-only album through his website, NPG Music Club. All the tracks, except "The Dance", were previously available on the same website in 2001, although some may have rearrangements in music and/or lyrics. "U Make My Sun Shine", a duet with Angie Stone, was released as a single in 2001. Three more tracks had a limited release as CD singles during Prince's 2001 Hit'N'Run Tour: "Supercute", "Underneath the Cream", and "Gamillah". The album's title comes from a line in "Judas Smile". "The Dance" was later re-recorded and included on the 2006 album, 3121. All the tracks, except "Judas Smile" and "The Dance", were at one point included on the aborted album project High.

The disc artwork on the download page showed a slightly different configuration of the album, missing "The Dance" but including "My Medallion", suggesting a last-minute change by Prince to replace the latter song by the former. In 2015, the album was released on music streaming service Tidal in this different configuration, which also included the full length version of "U Make My Sun Shine". In 2018, the album was released on other music services like Spotify and the iTunes Store.

Even though the album has never been officially released as a CD, there are bootlegs available.

== Track listing ==
All songs written by Prince.

=== 2004 release ===
1. "When Lay My Hands on U" – 3:45
2. "Judas Smile" – 6:37
3. "Supercute" – 4:17
4. "Underneath the Cream" – 4:04
5. "Sexmesexmenot" – 5:46
6. "Vavoom" – 4:40
7. "High" – 5:09
8. "The Dance" – 4:45
9. "Gamillah" (credited to The New Power Generation) – 3:13
10. "U Make My Sun Shine" – 5:52

=== 2015/2018 release ===
1. "When Lay My Hands on U" – 3:41
2. "Judas Smile" – 6:33
3. "Supercute" – 4:13
4. "Underneath the Cream" – 3:59
5. "My Medallion" – 5:07
6. "Vavoom" – 4:35
7. "High" – 5:05
8. "Sexmesexmenot" – 5:40
9. "Gamillah" – 3:09
10. "U Make My Sun Shine" – 7:05
