= The Slaughterhouse =

Studio album by Prince
- Released: March 29, 2004
- Recorded: 1997; early 1999; late 1999 – mid-2000
- Genre: R&B; funk; pop; hip hop; jazz; dance
- Length: 55:17
- Label: NPG
- Producer: Prince

Prince chronology
The Chocolate Invasion (2004)	The Slaughterhouse (2004)	3121 (2006)

Professional ratings
Review scores
Source	Rating
The Guardian	3/5 stars

The Slaughterhouse (Trax from the NPG Music Club Volume 2) is the thirtieth studio album by American recording artist Prince. It was released on March 29, 2004 by NPG Records. The album was released as MP3s through his website, NPG Music Club. The album's title comes from the first line of the song "Silicon", "Welcome 2 the slaughterhouse." The tracks consist of material previously available on the same website back in 2001, although some may have rearrangements of music and/or lyrics. "2045: Radical Man" was released on the soundtrack of Spike Lee's Bamboozled in 2001. "Peace" and "The Daisy Chain" were released as limited edition CD singles during Prince's 2001 Hit n Run Tour. In 2015, the album was released on the Tidal music service. It was made available on other online music services like Spotify and the iTunes Store in 2018.

Even though the album has never been officially released as a CD, there are bootlegs available.

== Track listing ==
All tracks are written by Prince. All tracks credited to Prince, except where noted.

No.	Title	Length
1.	"Silicon"	4:17
2.	"S&M Groove" (The Artist Formerly Known as Prince)	5:10
3.	"Y Should Do That When Can Do This?"	4:33
4.	"Golden Parachute"	5:38
5.	"Hypnoparadise" (The Artist Formerly Known as Prince)	6:05
6.	"Props 'n' Pounds"	4:38
7.	"Northside" (The New Power Generation)	6:34
8.	"Peace" (The New Power Generation)	5:35
9.	"2045: Radical Man" (The New Power Generation)	6:34
10.	"The Daisy Chain" (The New Power Generation (Note: Features a rap from David "DVS" Schwartz.))	6:13
Total length:		55:17
