= Rhonda Smith =

Canadian bassist, vocalist and songwriter

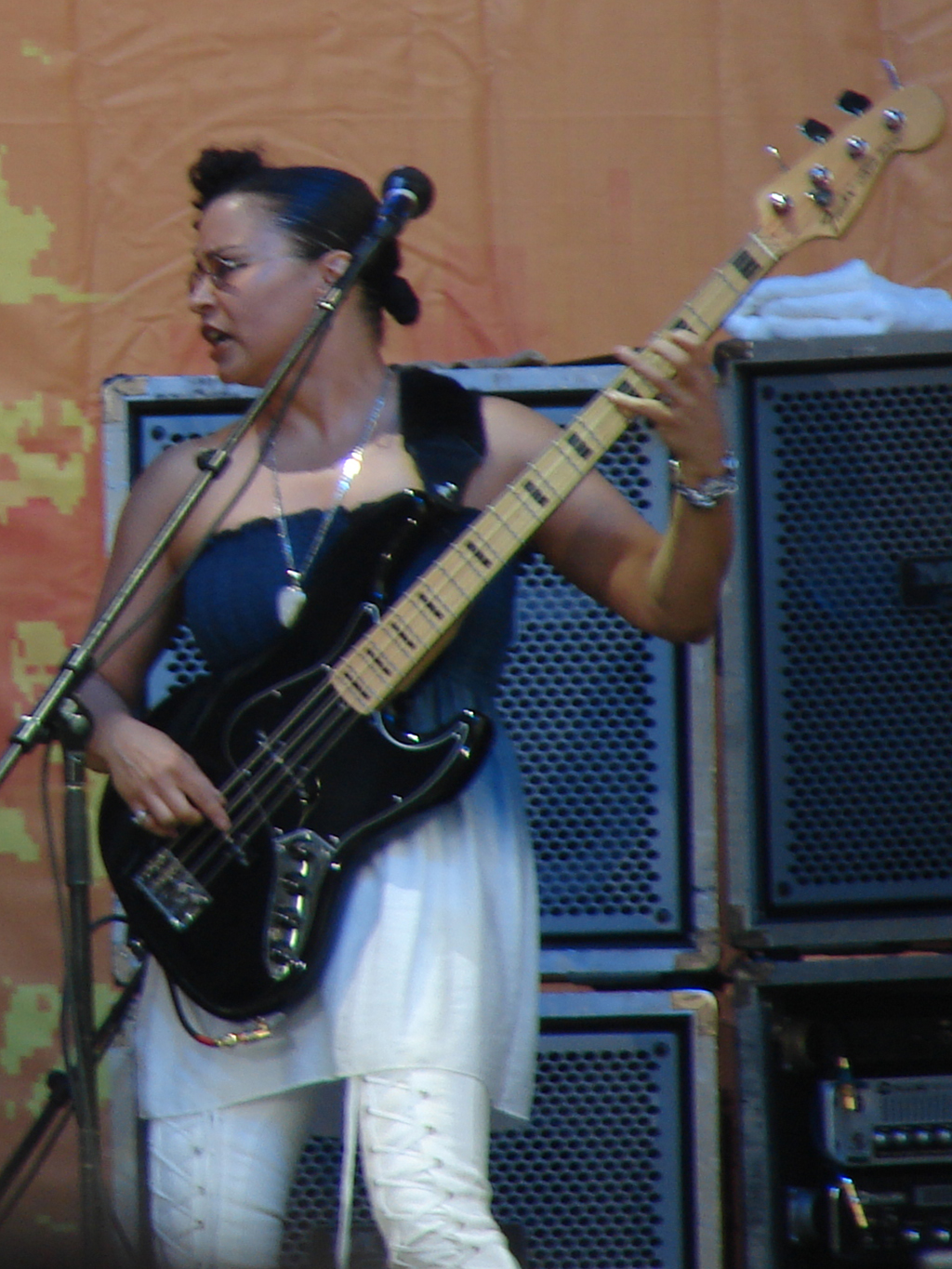
Smith performing in 2010

Rhonda Smith is a Canadian bassist, vocalist, and songwriter, best known for her long-running work with Prince and Jeff Beck. She has also recorded and toured with artists including Chaka Khan, Beyoncé, T.I., Sheila E., Patrice Rushen, and Rachelle Ferrell.

== Biography ==
=== Early life ===
Smith was born in Halifax, Nova Scotia, Canada. Her family moved to Montreal when she was a child. She and her three siblings were encouraged to play music and she began playing baritone horn, keyboards, guitar, and eventually electric bass. Smith took up the bass around age twelve after her older brother brought one home and told her not to touch it. In addition to taking private classical training on double bass, Smith attended McGill University in Montreal, studying jazz performance; among her formative influences were bassists Stanley Clarke, Larry Graham, and Jaco Pastorius.

=== Early career ===
After gaining some experience in the local rock scene, she moved on to work with Canadian artists Claude Dubois, Daniel Lavoie, Robert Charlebois and Joanne Blouin. She won a Juno award for "Best Contemporary Jazz Album", for her work with Jim Hillman and The Merlin Factor.

=== Prince ===
While attending a music convention in Germany, Smith met Sheila E. and gave her a press kit after learning Prince was putting a new band together. Two months later, Prince called and Smith went to Paisley Park to record on the Emancipation album. Smith recorded and toured with Prince for almost 10 years, from the 1996 Emancipation album through the 2004 Musicology album, and continued to perform with him live afterward.

=== Jeff Beck and other collaborations ===
Other musicians she has worked with include Chaka Khan, Beyoncé, T.I., Erykah Badu, Lee Ritenour, Jeff Beck, and Terri Lyne Carrington. as well as Patti Austin, Patrice Rushen, Brenda Russell, Larry Graham, Patti LaBelle, Little Richard, Najee, Candy Dulfer, Kirk Whalum, George Clinton, and Rick Derringer.

Smith was recommended to guitarist Jeff Beck by drummer Narada Michael Walden and joined Beck's touring band in 2010, going on to record and tour with him for over a decade. In 2022, Smith also became a member of Cleto and the Cletones, the house band of Jimmy Kimmel Live!.

=== Solo career ===
In 2000, she released her first solo record, Intellipop, on which she served as an executive producer and songwriter, blending elements of funk and jazz fusion drawn from her experience with Prince.

In 2021, she released a new album, Won't Come Back. her first new solo material in fifteen years since RS2, written during the COVID-19 lockdown; a remix featuring TROY NoKA followed in 2022.

== Discography ==
- Intellipop (2000)
- RS2 (2006)
- Won't come back (2021)
- Won't come back Remix featuring TROY NoKA (2022)

with the New Power Generation

- Newpower Soul - 1998

Prince albums where she appears on

- Emancipation - 1996 (5 tracks)
- Christal Ball - 1998
- The Truth 1998
- Rave Un2 the Joy Fantastic - 2001 (2 tracks)
- One Nite Alone... Live! - 2002 (almost? all tracks)
- Xpectation - 2003 (all tracks)
- N·E·W·S - 2003 (all tracks)
- Musicology - 2004 (2 tracks)

With Jeff Beck

- Live and Exclusive from the Grammy Museum - 2010
- 18 (with Johnny Depp) (2022)

With Chaka Khan

- Come 2 My House - 1998
