= Xpectation =

Studio album by Prince
- Released: January 1, 2003
- Recorded: Early 2001
- Studio: Paisley Park, Chanhassen, Minnesota
- Genre: Jazz fusion; instrumental
- Length: 40:53
- Label: NPG
- Producer: Prince

Prince chronology
One Nite Alone... Live! (2002)	Xpectation (2003)	N·E·W·S (2003)

Professional ratings
Review scores
Source	Rating
The Guardian	3/5 stars

Xpectation (subtitled "New Directions in Music By Prince") is the twenty-sixth studio album by American recording artist Prince. It was released on January 1, 2003, by NPG Records. It is the first instrumental album released under Prince's own name. Previously unannounced, it was released as an MP3 download on New Year's Day, 2003 to members of the NPG Music Club with no formal artwork, only two weeks after the commercial release of his previous album, One Nite Alone... Live!.

In 2004, Xpectation was released through the NPG Music Club's Musicology Download Store. The artwork by Sam Jennings was officially released in September 2015, when a digital lossless version was made available through music streaming service Tidal.

== Track listing ==
All songs written by Prince.

Xpectation track listing
No.	Title	Length
1.	"Xhalation"	2:04
2.	"Xcogitate"	3:33
3.	"Xemplify"	5:53
4.	"Xpectation"	4:01
5.	"Xotica"	3:05
6.	"Xogenous"	4:12
7.	"Xpand"	6:11
8.	"Xosphere"	3:34
9.	"Xpedition"	8:24

== Personnel ==
Musicians

- Prince – keyboards and guitar
- John Blackwell – drums
- Rhonda Smith – bass guitar
- Candy Dulfer – saxophone
- Vanessa Mae – violin

== See also ==
- List of music released from NPG Music Club
