= One Nite Alone... =

Studio album by Prince
- Released: May 14, 2002
- Recorded: 2001
- Studio: Paisley Park, Chanhassen, Minnesota
- Genre: Smooth jazz; acoustic; quiet storm
- Length: 35:01
- Label: NPG
- Producer: Prince

Prince chronology
The Rainbow Children (2001)	One Nite Alone... (2002)	One Nite Alone... Live! (2002)

Professional ratings
Review scores
Source	Rating
The Guardian	3/5 stars

One Nite Alone... is the twenty-fifth studio album by American recording artist Prince. It was released on May 14, 2002, by NPG Records. Released to members of NPG Music Club and never sold in stores, it was the first Prince album not to chart.

Songs on the album largely feature Prince singing and accompanying himself on piano, making only occasional use of other instruments. It includes a cover of the Joni Mitchell classic "A Case of You", retitled "A Case of U", and thanks her in the liner notes.

One song that caused some controversy amongst fans is "Avalanche", which describes Abraham Lincoln as a racist, and includes the line "Mr. John Hammond with his pen in hand... Sayin' 'Sign your kingdom over to me and be known throughout the land!'"

One Nite Alone... was given to members of the NPG Music Club, separately and included in his One Nite Alone...Live box set. Original CD copies are quite rare. For many years, the primary way to hear the album was through bootlegs shared as MP3s. In 2015, the album was released on the Tidal streaming service, and on May 29, 2020, the album was released on vinyl.

== Track listing ==
All songs written by Prince, except "A Case of U" by Joni Mitchell.

One Nite Alone... track listing
No.	Title	Length
1.	"One Nite Alone..."	3:37
2.	"U're Gonna C Me"	5:16
3.	"Here on Earth"	3:23
4.	"A Case of U"	3:39
5.	"Have a Heart"	2:04
6.	"Objects in the Mirror"	3:27
7.	"Avalanche"	4:24
8.	"Pearls B4 the Swine"	3:01
9.	"Young and Beautiful"	2:44
10.	"Arboretum" (instrumental)	3:26

Notes

- "One Nite Alone", "U're Gonna C Me", "Here on Earth", "A Case of U", and "Pearls B4 the Swine" were initially released through the NPG Music Club in 2001.
- "U're Gonna C Me" was re-recorded with new instrumentation for MPLSound.
- "A Case of U" is dedicated to the memory of John L. Nelson, Prince's father.

== Personnel ==
- Prince – all vocals and instruments except where noted
- John Blackwell – drums on tracks 3 and 4
- Ambient singing – Prince's doves, Divinity and Majesty

== Charts ==
Chart performance for One Nite Alone... (Solo Piano and Voice by Prince)
Chart (2020)	Peak position
Belgian Albums (Ultratop Flanders)	192
Belgian Albums (Ultratop Wallonia)	105
French Albums (SNEP)	191
