= Rave Un2 the Joy Fantastic =

1999 studio album by Prince

Studio album by Prince
- Released: November 9, 1999
- Recorded: 1988, June 1998–September 1999
- Studios: Paisley Park, Chanhassen; Electric Lady, New York City; O'Henry Sound, Burbank
- Genres: Funk; pop; R&B
- Length: 64:08
- Labels: NPG; Arista
- Producer: Prince

Prince chronology
The Vault: Old Friends 4 Sale (1999)	Rave Un2 the Joy Fantastic (1999)	Rave In2 the Joy Fantastic (2001)

Singles from Rave Un2 the Joy Fantastic
- 1. "The Greatest Romance Ever Sold" Released: October 5, 1999

Rave Un2 the Joy Fantastic is the twenty-third studio album by American recording artist Prince, going by the unpronounceable "Love Symbol" as shown on the album cover. Released on November 9, 1999, by NPG Records and Arista Records, the album was issued shortly after the release of The Vault: Old Friends 4 Sale (1999). It includes several guest appearances, including by Gwen Stefani, Eve, and Sheryl Crow; Prince also completed a cover of Crow's 1996 single "Everyday Is a Winding Road". A pop and R&B album, it departs from the soul genre found on Prince's previous efforts.

The album received generally mixed reviews from critics, who enjoyed the guest appearances on the album, but were confused by Prince's attempts at harnessing the pop music market. Commercially, the album peaked at number eighteen on the Billboard 200 in the United States and number five in Canada, becoming his most successful album in North America in over three years, with moderate results elsewhere. By the end of 1999, the album was certified Gold by the Recording Industry Association of America. The album's sole single, "The Greatest Romance Ever Sold", peaked at number 63 on the Billboard Hot 100. To further promote the album, Prince hosted a pay-per-view event, entitled Rave Un2 the Year 2000 which would later be released on DVD.

== Background and release ==
Development of the album began in 1988, under the working title Rave Unto the Joy Fantastic. However, when the recording and writing sessions proved fruitless, the entire project was abandoned. A majority of the songs written for the album were originally made for Prince's previous works, such as Lovesexy (1988) and Graffiti Bridge (1990). In June 1998, Prince resumed the project, creating a "reworked" version of the title track, and enlisting help from other musicians, such as Gwen Stefani, Eve and Sheryl Crow. Recording sessions took place in Chanhassen, Minnesota, at Paisley Park Studios, as well as at Electric Lady Studios, New York City and O'Henry Sound Studios, in Burbank, California. The production for the record concluded in September 1999, nearing two months to its scheduled release date. A digital version of the album was released exclusively to both of Prince's official website (1800new-funk.com and love4oneanother.com) and features enhancements that are not included on the physical edition. Prince described his decision to wear a blue jacket made out of faux wool instead of actual fur for the cover artwork:

If this jacket were real wool, it would have taken seven lambs whose lives would have begun like this ... Within weeks of their birth, their ears would have been hole-punched, their tails chopped off and the males would have been castrated while fully conscious. [E]xtremely high rates of mortality [a]r[e] considered normal: 20-40% of lambs die b[efore] the age of 8 weeks: 8 million mature sheep die every year from disease, [e]xposure or neglect.

People for the Ethical Treatment of Animals, a non-profit organization regarding the humane treatment of animals, supported Prince, with member Alisa Mullins claiming that "Prince deserves a lifetime achievement award based on his empathy for animals alone". Rave Un2 the Joy Fantastic was released on November 9, 1999, in the United States, his first major-label release since Emancipation (1996). In select European countries, including Germany and Spain, the record was released on November 11, two days later. Instead of using his name, Prince displayed the unpronounceable "Love Symbol" as the album's artist. The CD's standard edition release included sixteen tracks, plus two hidden tracks, "Segue III" and "Prettyman". The record also includes some of Prince's first radio releases since Chaos and Disorder (1996), to which he commented: "I look forward to hearing my songs on the radio again. It's been a while."

== Composition ==
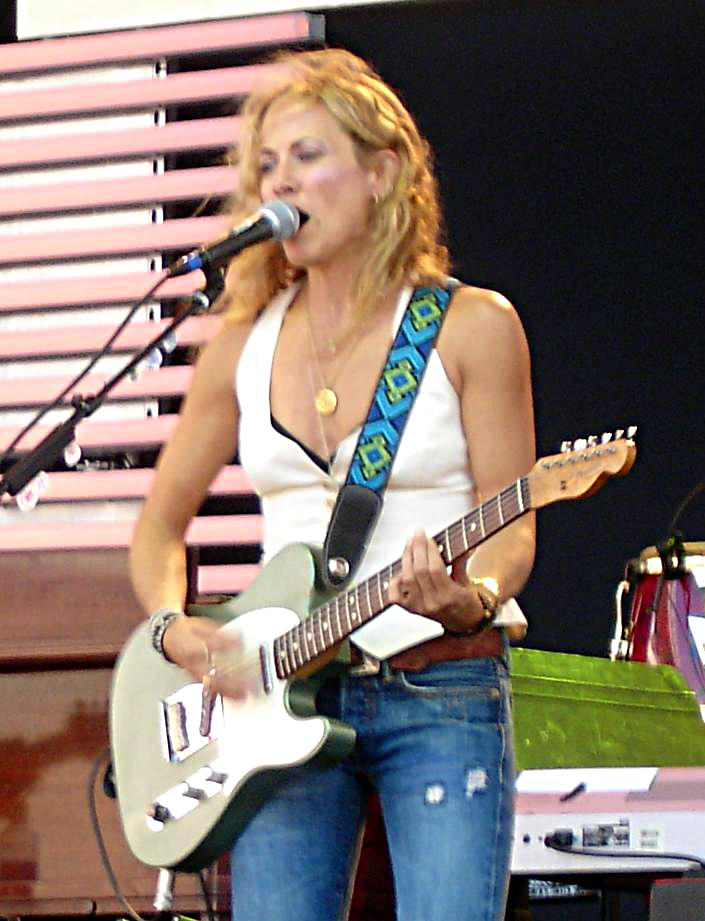
Sheryl Crow contributed to two of the album's songs: promotional single "Baby Knows" and "Everyday Is a Winding Road".

Musically a pop and R&B album, Rave Un2 the Joy Fantastic explores the former two genres after the frequent use of soul on The Vault: Old Friends 4 Sale. The album's opening title track, originally recorded in 1988, is one of Prince's "most pop-oriented" tracks in years. "Undisputed" contains rap verses by Chuck D, a feature uncommon on Prince's works. Intended to serve as a "comeback", "The Greatest Romance Ever Sold" is a "smooth" ballad with Prince's multi-layered vocals featured in the chorus. The album's fourth track, "Segue I", is four seconds of silence followed by "Hot Wit' U", a hip-hop track featuring vocals from Eve. "Tangerine" follows and contains acoustic bass orchestrated by musician Rhonda Smith.

"So Far, So Pleased" is the album's seventh track and features verses from Gwen Stefani. The pair's collaboration was called an "utterly delightful, effervescent duet". "The Sun, the Moon and Stars" is a ballad containing production catered to the same crowd. A cover of Sheryl Crow's 1996 single "Everyday Is a Winding Road" is the album's ninth track, but contains a more "sexualized" structure compared to Crow's rendition. "Segue II" is a short instrumental track, followed by promotional singles "Man'O'War" and "Baby Knows", the former of which is a "sexy ballad" and the latter featuring contributions from Crow, including her vocals and use of a harmonica.

The album's thirteenth track, " Love U, but Don't Trust U Anymore", features a guest appearance from folk rock singer Ani DiFranco, who plays an acoustic guitar. "Silly Game" uses features strings performed by the NPG Orchestra. "Strange but True" uses a "spoken-word soliloquy with a funky foundation", similar to Prince's previous song, "Irresistible Bitch". The album's final mentioned track, "Wherever U Go, Whatever U Do", is another "subtle" ballad, similar to "So Far, So Pleased" and "The Sun, the Moon and Stars". The standard edition of the album contains two hidden tracks, "Segue III" (also appears as "1-800-Newfunk Ad" on select releases), which is like the other two similarly titled tracks, and "Prettyman", which is a jazz song, including a special appearance from saxophonist Maceo Parker.

== Promotion ==
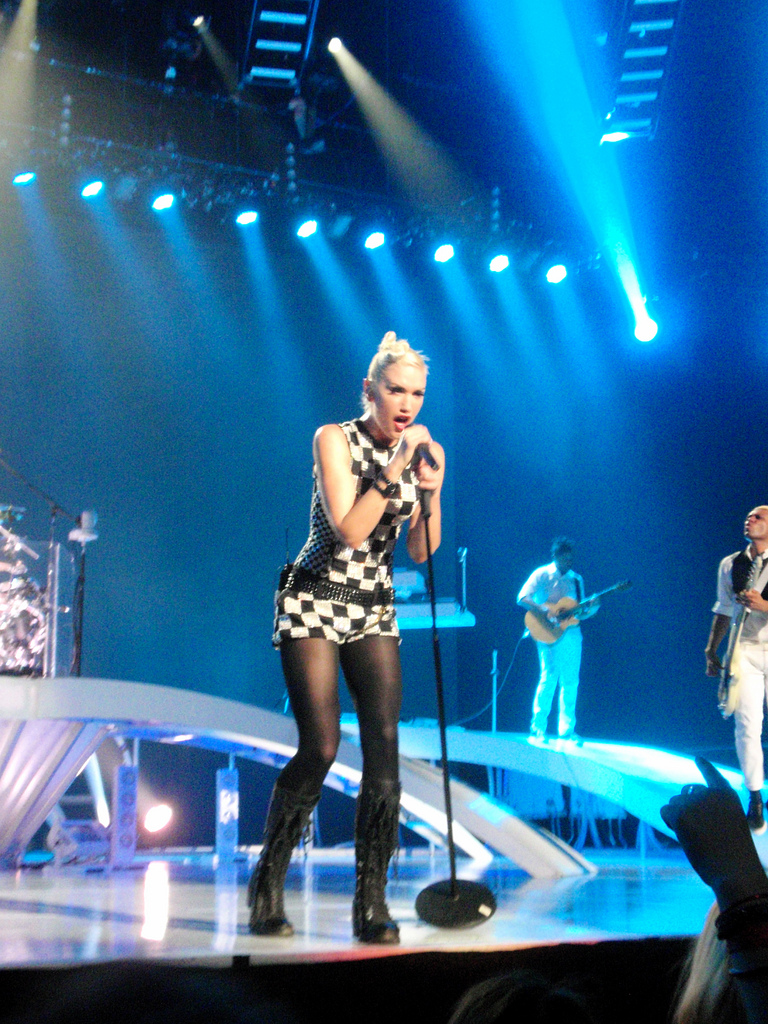
"So Far, So Pleased", a duet with Gwen Stefani, was originally planned to be issued as a single, but the release never occurred.

Unlike Prince's previous albums, the release for Rave Un2 the Joy Fantastic did not coincide with promotional appearances in the United States. Instead, Prince performed several of the album's tracks live on European television programs, in hopes that the performances would strengthen his appeal there. On December 31, 1999, Prince debuted a television special, Rave Un2 the Year 2000, as a pay-per-view program to promote the album. The event included renditions of Prince's songs with guest appearances from Rosie Gaines, Morris Day, Maceo Parker and Lenny Kravitz. On April 29, 2001, Prince released his first remix album, entitled Rave In2 the Joy Fantastic. The album contained 13 of Rave Un2 the Joy Fantastic's tracks, along with additional remixes and an unreleased song called "Beautiful Strange". However, the remix album was not made commercially available and was only purchasable by members of his official fan club. In 2019 a special edition box set was released posthumously containing both the albums Rave Un2 the Joy Fantastic, Rave In2 the Joy Fantastic and the DVD Rave Un2 the Year 2000 called Ultimate Rave. The box set charted in the Netherlands.

=== Singles ===
"The Greatest Romance Ever Sold" was released as the album's lead and only single on October 5, 1999, a month before the album's release; a CD single featuring the track plus three remixes was released in European countries on November 23, 1999. The issue additionally contained remixes with vocals from Eve. "So Far, So Pleased" and "Hot Wit' U", featuring guest vocals from Gwen Stefani and Eve, respectively, were also planned to be released as singles in 2000. The release would have included an extended play titled The Hot X-perience with remixes of both tracks, but the release was subsequently cancelled. However, both single versions were later released on Rave In2 the Joy Fantastic.

Two promotional singles, "Baby Knows" and "Man'O'War", were released in late 1999 and early 2000, respectively. "Baby Knows" features vocals from Sheryl Crow and was released exclusively in the Netherlands. "Man'O'War" was released exclusively in the United States as a CD single; the package included three versions of the song: the album version, a non-guitar version, and a "Call Out Research" 15-second hook.

== Critical reception ==
Professional ratings
Review scores
Source	Rating
AllMusic	2.5/5 stars
Classic Pop	9/10
Christgau's Consumer Guide	(2-star Honorable Mention)
Entertainment Weekly	B−
The Guardian	3/5 stars
NME	2/10
Q	3/5 stars
Rolling Stone	3.5/5 stars
The Sydney Morning Herald	3.5/5 stars

After its release, Rave Un2 the Joy Fantastic received generally mixed reviews from music critics. Stephen Thomas Erlewine at AllMusic commented that the album "is frighteningly similar to Prince's 1998 album, Newpower Soul" and praised the collaborations, but stated that the effort "is one for the dedicated, like every album he's made since he changed his name to a symbol". Village Voice critic Robert Christgau said Prince's "shtick" was less tired than Ray Charles' after 20 years, describing the album as a lofty brand of "generic", "where pro forma cameos failed to produce the hits Clive Davis banks on". Nathan Rabin of The A.V. Club congratulated Prince for "mark[ing] his return not just to major labels, but to commercial ambition and accessibility" while Adam Mattera in Echoes called the album "a savvy attempt to reignite his career through a series of radio-friendly missiles and superstar collaborations similar to Clive Davis' recent triumph with Santana’s "Supernatural"." Chris Willman, writing for Entertainment Weekly, was also impressed by the effort and praised Prince for "trying to recapture the spirit of '99". Wendy Hermanson from Yahoo! Music favored the record, and highlighted the singer's decision to work with other artists, particularly with Chuck D on "Undisputed".

On a mixed note, Touré of Rolling Stone stated that the album's "few sublime moments outweigh[ed] the lackluster album around them," further praising "Prettyman" for being "a roaring up-tempo number", but panning "Undisputed" and "Hot Wit' U" for being "the worst of his nineties work". Eamon Sweeney from Hot Press was also mixed in his review, stating that it "would be hard to name another artist who can produce such a perfect soundtrack", but found at times that the singer "ha[d] lost his magic". Similarly, Robin Rothman of Village Voice enjoyed the collaborations, but opined that they would "be better described as augmentations". In a very negative review, a critic from NME stated "To paraphrase Woody Allen, genius is like a shark; it has to move forward or it dies. And what we have here is a patchily impressive, fleetingly satisfying, but very, very dead shark". In a list compiled by staff members from Stereogum ranking the singer's albums out of thirty positions, they listed Rave Un2 the Joy Fantastic at number 25. The site's consensus stated that among the album's tracks, his cover of "Everyday Is a Winding Road" was the only highlight.

== Commercial performance ==
Commercially, the album was unsuccessful compared to Prince's previous efforts. Despite this, it was able to peak at number eight on Billboard's Top R&B/Hip-Hop Albums component chart, becoming one of Prince's highest charting albums. Although released shortly after his previous studio album, The Vault: Old Friends 4 Sale (1999), Rave Un2 the Joy Fantastic debuted and peaked at number eighteen on the Billboard 200, while the former only peaked at number eighty-five. In Canada, the album was more successful, peaking and debuting at number five. In Europe, the record achieved varied chart positions, reaching the top 20 in the Netherlands (where it lasted 13 weeks on the charts and peaked at number 17) and Switzerland, but peaking within the lower regions of the charts in Germany and the United Kingdom (at numbers 53 and 145, respectively). On December 10, 1999, the album was certified Gold by the Recording Industry Association of America for sales of over 500,000 copies, becoming his seventeenth album to reach this achievement.

== Track listing ==
All songs written and produced by Prince, except "Everyday Is a Winding Road" by Sheryl Crow, Jeff Trott and Brian MacLeod.

Rave Un2 the Joy Fantastic track listing
No.	Title	Length
1.	"Rave Un2 the Joy Fantastic"	4:18
2.	"Undisputed" (featuring Chuck D)	4:19
3.	"The Greatest Romance Ever Sold"	5:29
4.	"Segue"	0:04
5.	"Hot Wit U" (featuring Eve)	5:11
6.	"Tangerine"	1:30
7.	"So Far, So Pleased" (featuring Gwen Stefani)	3:23
8.	"The Sun, the Moon and Stars"	5:15
9.	"Everyday Is a Winding Road"	6:12
10.	"Segue"	0:18
11.	"Man'O'War"	5:14
12.	"Baby Knows" (featuring Sheryl Crow)	3:18
13.	" Love U, but Don't Trust U Anymore" (featuring Ani DiFranco)	3:33
14.	"Silly Game"	3:29
15.	"Strange but True"	4:12
16.	"Wherever U Go, Whatever U Do"	3:17
17.	"Segue" (hidden track)	0:43
18.	"Prettyman" (hidden track)	4:23
Total length:		64:08

Japanese edition bonus tracks
No.	Title	Length
16.	"Wherever U Go, Whatever U Do"	3:16
17.	"The Greatest Romance Ever Sold" (Adam & Eve remix; featuring Eve)	5:32
18.	"Segue" (hidden track)	0:43
19.	"Prettyman" (hidden track)	4:23
Total length:		69:40

=== Notes ===
- Every use of the pronoun "I" throughout the song titles and liner notes is actually represented by a stylized "👁" symbol.
- Track 16 and total length do not include the over five minutes of silence on physical copies after "Wherever U Go, Whatever U Do".

== Credits and personnel ==
Credits adapted from the album's official liner notes and Guitarcloud.

- Prince – lead and backing vocals, electric guitars, Oberheim OB-8, Roland JV-80, Roland VK-7, Clavia Nord Lead 2, Roland A-90, Roland JD-800, Korg TR, Roland JV-2080, bass guitar, drums, Linn LM-1, Roland PAD-80 Octapad II; LinnDrum (1)
- Mike Scott – guitar (3)
- Ani DiFranco – acoustic guitar (13)
- Rhonda Smith – acoustic bass (6), bass guitar (7)
- Kirk Johnson – drums (7), percussion (11)
- Michael B. – drums (12)
- Kenni Holmen – saxophone (5)
- Kathy Jensen – saxophone (5)
- Maceo Parker – saxophone (18)
- Steve Strand – trumpet (5)
- Dave Jensen – trumpet (5)
- Michael B. Nelson – trombone (5)
- Gwen Stefani – co-lead vocals (7)
- Sheryl Crow – co-lead vocals and harmonica (12)
- Marva King – backing vocals (7)
- Larry Graham – backing vocals (9)
- DuJuan Blackshire – backing vocals (9)
- Johnnie Blackshire – backing vocals (9)
- Kip Blackshire – vocoder vocals (2, 9)
- Chuck D – rap (2)
- Eve – rap (5)
- Bros. Jules – scratches (2, 18)
- Clare Fischer – orchestration (8, 10, 14)

== Charts ==
Chart performance for Rave Un2 the Joy Fantastic
Chart (1999)	Peak position
Australian Albums (ARIA)	82
Austrian Albums (Ö3 Austria)	44
Belgian Albums (Ultratop Wallonia)	30
Canada Top Albums/CDs (RPM)	5
Dutch Albums (Album Top 100)	17
French Albums (SNEP)	37
German Albums (Offizielle Top 100)	39
Norwegian Albums (VG-lista)	37
Swedish Albums (Sverigetopplistan)	49
Swiss Albums (Schweizer Hitparade)	19
UK Albums (Official Charts)	145
US Billboard 200	18
US Top R&B/Hip-Hop Albums (Billboard)	8

== Certifications ==
Certifications for Rave Un2 the Joy Fantastic
Region	Certification	Certified units/sales
United States (RIAA)	Gold	500,000^{^}
^{^} Shipments figures based on certification alone.

== Release history ==
Release history and formats for Rave Un2 the Joy Fantastic
Region	Date	Format	Label	Ref.
United States	November 9, 1999	Cassette; CD; LP	NPG; Arista	
Germany	November 11, 1999	Cassette; CD; LP	NPG; Arista	
Spain	November 11, 1999	Cassette; CD; LP	NPG; Arista	
France	November 15, 1999	CD	NPG; Arista	
