= John Blackwell (musician) =

American drummer (1973–2017)

- Born: September 9, 1973; Columbia, South Carolina, U.S.
- Died: July 4, 2017 (aged 43) Land o' Lakes, Florida, U.S.
- Genres: R&B, pop, funk, jazz fusion, jazz
- Occupation: Drummer
- Instrument: Drums
- Years active: 1995–2017

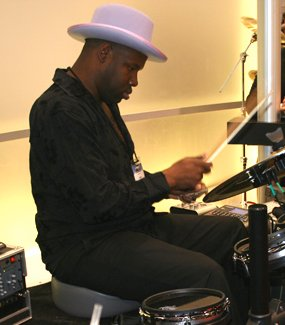
John Blackwell Jr. was an early adopter of electronic drums.

John Blackwell Jr. (September 9, 1973 – July 4, 2017) was an American contemporary R&B, funk, jazz, fusion, and pop drummer, best known for his work with Prince. Later, he was a member of D'Angelo's backing band, The Vanguard.

== Career ==
Blackwell was born and raised in Columbia, South Carolina, and started playing drums at age 3. He learned from his father, John Blackwell Sr., a drummer himself, who played with Mary Wells, King Curtis, Joe Simon, J.J. Jackson, The Drifters, The Spinners, and others. Blackwell stated that he experienced synesthesia since he was a child, seeing colors for musical notes, and was identified as having perfect pitch while in high school.

As a teenager, Blackwell played in both his high-school jazz and marching bands. He began playing in jazz clubs at age 13. At 17, he landed his first professional gig backing jazz singer and bandleader Billy Eckstine. After high school, he attended Berklee College of Music and worked steadily in local Boston jazz clubs. He left Berklee in 1995 to play with the funk band Cameo, a gig which lasted for three years.

Blackwell moved to Los Angeles in 1998 to look for more drumming work, and got a job playing with Patti LaBelle for three years. He appeared on her 1998 album Live! One Night Only, which won the Grammy Award for Best Traditional R&B Vocal Performance. Blackwell met Prince while performing with LaBelle in Minneapolis. Blackwell toured with Japanese-American singer Hikaru Utada, and then joined Prince's band, The New Power Generation, in September 2000.

Blackwell played with Prince on and off for 12 years, appearing on numerous releases, including the 2001 album, The Rainbow Children, the 2003 Live at the Aladdin Las Vegas DVD, the 2003 instrumental album, N.E.W.S, which was nominated for a Grammy Award for Best Pop Instrumental Album, and 2004's Musicology. Blackwell performed with Justin Timberlake on his FutureSex/LoveShow tour. He has also played with Crystal Kay, P Diddy and Charlie Singleton. Blackwell played at the 2008 Buddy Rich Memorial Concert.

Blackwell played with Maze, featuring Frankie Beverly. He released his debut album in December 2009, titled The John Blackwell Project. He has released two educational drumming DVDs: John Blackwell - Technique, Grooving and Showmanship, and John Blackwell. He joined the European leg of singer D'Angelo's The Second Coming Tour in 2015, as a member of his band, The Vanguard. He also toured as a member of bassist William "Bootsy" Collins' Bootsy's Rubber Band that year.

He had endorsements from Dixon Drums, Remo Drumheads, Regal Tip Drumsticks, and Turkish Cymbals. Previously, he endorsed Tama Drums, Yamaha Drums, Evans Drumheads, Sabian Cymbals, Zildjian Cymbals and Drumsticks, and Vater Drumsticks.

Blackwell joined Chinese musician Xu Wei's band for his tour named "At This Moment" in 2013. They performed in cities such as Beijing (May 17), Shanghai (July 13), Harbin (August 10), Hangzhou (August 24) and Shenzhen (September 7).

== Death ==
In July 2016, Blackwell announced that he had lost the use of his left arm and leg due to a brain tumor. On July 4, 2017, his wife announced his death. John Blackwell was 43. He had 1 son.
