= Greg Boyer (musician) =

American trombonist

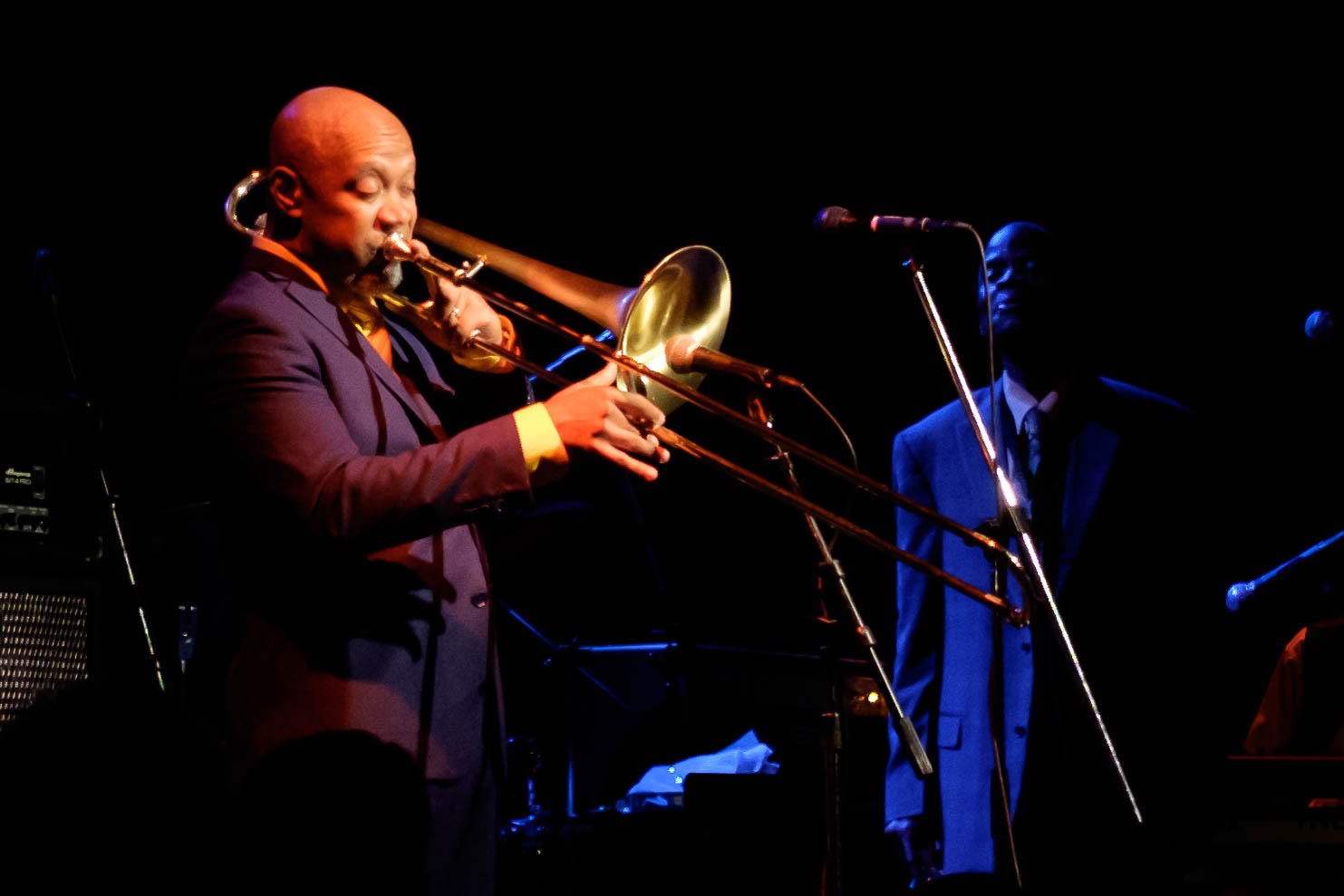
Greg Boyer performs with Maceo Parker at Jazz Alley in Seattle, Washington on August 8, 2015.

Greg Boyer (born September 25, 1958) is an American trombonist known for performing with many successful R&B and funk bands.

== Biography ==
Born in Washington, DC, Boyer grew up in Bryans Road, Maryland. An avid music lover at an early age, his first steps into the world of playing music were on alto saxophone at the age of 10. By the time he graduated from Lackey High School, he could play any and every instrument in the band. Although his primary focus was classical tuba, he was already playing gigs on tenor saxophone with local R&B and funk bands.

Switching to trombone in his freshman year at St. Mary's College (Maryland) for his off-campus engagements, he left school after his third semester and joined Parliament/Funkadelic in 1978. He played with them until his retirement from the group in 1996, along the way also playing with Chuck Brown & the Soul Searchers between tours.

After a couple of years playing and arranging for local Washington, DC groups, he hit the road again with funky sax legend Maceo Parker. In 2002 after being recommended to Prince by Maceo, he got a call from Prince to join his NPG Band, with whom he served for seven years as trombonist/horn arranger. Along with the aforementioned, the list of artists/groups he has recorded and played with includes: Sheila E, Bootsy Collins, Gap Band, Stanley Clarke, George Duke, David Sanborn, Eric Benét, David Murray, Lynyrd Skynyrd, Alex Bugnon, Buddy Guy, Brian Culbertson, Maysa, Mike Phillips, RAD. Richard Smallwood, Lakecia Benjamin , Third World, Israel Vibration, Patra, Crystal Waters, Dog Eat Dog and Naif Herin.

Greg Boyer has 3 children in the DC metropolitan area. Adrian Boyer-Frostburg University alum, Amanda Boyer -University of Maryland alum, and Aja Boyer -University of Maryland. He lives in Columbia, Maryland with his wife Dana Addison, married September 20, 2003.
