= NPG Records =

Record label of the musician Prince

- Founded: 1994; 32 years ago
- Founder: Prince
- Genre: Various
- Country of origin: United States

NPG Records is a record label that was owned by Prince and run by Trevor Guy. "NPG" is short for New Power Generation. It was founded to release his music after Paisley Park Records was shut down by Warner Bros. Records in 1994.

Though the 1994 compilation 1-800-NEW-FUNK featured several artists, NPG Records never developed into a full label like Paisley Park did; instead, it exclusively released Prince's albums or side-projects.

== Discography ==
=== Prince releases ===
Year of release	Album title	Distributed by	Released as
1994	The Beautiful Experience (EP)	Bellmark/Life Records through Bellmark Records	Prince
1995	The Gold Experience	Warner Bros. Records	Prince
1996	Emancipation	EMI	Prince
1997	NYC (EP)	unknown	Prince
1998	Crystal Ball	NPG Records	Prince
1998	The Truth	NPG Records	Prince
1999	1999: The New Master (EP)	NPG Records	Prince and The Revolution
1999	Rave Un2 the Joy Fantastic	Arista Records	Prince
2001	Rave In2 the Joy Fantastic	unknown	Prince
2001	The Rainbow Children	Redline Entertainment	Prince
2002	One Nite Alone...	NPG Music Club	Prince
2002	One Nite Alone... Live!	unknown	Prince and The New Power Generation
2003	Xpectation	NPG Music Club	Prince
2003	C-Note	NPG Music Club	Prince
2003	N.E.W.S	Big Daddy Music Distribution	Prince
2004	Musicology	Columbia Records	Prince
2004	The Chocolate Invasion	NPG Music Club	Prince
2004	The Slaughterhouse	NPG Music Club	Prince
2006	3121	Universal Music Group	Prince
2007	Planet Earth	Columbia Records	Prince
2008	Indigo Nights	unknown	Prince
2009	LOtUSFLOW3R / MPLSoUND	Because Music	Prince
2010	20Ten	unknown	Prince
2014	Plectrumelectrum	Warner Bros. Records	Prince and 3rdeyegirl
2014	Art Official Age	Warner Bros. Records	Prince
2015	Hit n Run Phase One	Universal	Prince
2015	Hit n Run Phase Two	Tidal	Prince
2016	Prince 4Ever	Warner Bros. Records	Prince
2017	Purple Rain Deluxe	Warner Bros. Records	Prince & The Revolution
2018	Piano and a Microphone 1983	Warner Bros. Records	Prince
2019	Originals	Warner Bros. Records	Prince
2019	1999 Deluxe	Warner Bros. Records	Prince
2021	Welcome 2 America	Legacy Recordings	Prince

=== Other artists ===
Year of release	Album title	Distributed by	Recording Artist
1993	Goldnigga	unknown	The New Power Generation
1994	1-800-NEW-FUNK	Bellmark/Life Records through Bellmark Records	Various Artists
1995	Exodus	Edel	The New Power Generation
1995	Drum Fever	Edel	Jacob Armen
1995	Child of the Sun	Edel	Mayte
1998	Kamasutra	unknown	The NPG Orchestra
1998	Newpower Soul	BMG through RCA Records	The New Power Generation
1998	Come 2 My House	BMG	Chaka Khan
1999	GCS 2000	BMG	Graham Central Station
2009	Elixer (released as part of LOtUSFLOW3R / MPLSoUND)	Because Music	Bria Valente
2012	Superconductor	unknown	Andy Allo
2015	Back In Time	Tidal	Judith Hill
2015	Oui Can Luv	Tidal	Andy Allo featuring Prince

== See also ==
- List of record labels
- Paisley Park Records
