= The Rainbow Children =

Studio album by Prince
- Released: November 20, 2001
- Recorded: September 5, 2000–June 19, 2001
- Studios: Paisley Park, Chanhassen, Minnesota
- Genres: Funk; jazz-funk; jazz fusion
- Length: 68:49
- Labels: NPG; Redline Entertainment
- Producer: Prince

Prince chronology
The Very Best of Prince (2001)	The Rainbow Children (2001)	One Nite Alone... (2002)

Singles from The Rainbow Children
- 1. "The Work, pt. 1" Released: 2001

Professional ratings
Aggregate scores
Source	Rating
Metacritic	54/100
Review scores
Source	Rating
AllMusic	2.5/5 stars
Entertainment Weekly	C+
The Guardian	2/5 stars
Mojo	3/5 stars
Q	4/5 stars
Rolling Stone	2.5/5 stars
Slant	2/5 stars
Spin	2/10
Tom Hull – on the Web	B
Uncut	4/10

The Rainbow Children is the twenty-fourth studio album by American recording artist Prince. It was released on November 20, 2001, by NPG Records and Redline Entertainment. It was also released through Prince's website earlier in the year. It is the first album released outside of the NPG Music Club to be released under the name of Prince again, as he had reverted to his previous stage name from his symbolic moniker a year earlier. It was released on double vinyl with a glossy color booklet, and was not available on vinyl again until the Legacy release in 2020.

This concept album illustrates common Prince themes of spirituality and human sexuality, as well as love and racism, through the fictitious story of a social movement toward a Martin Luther King Jr.-inspired utopian society. The album seems to allude to his recent conversion to the Jehovah's Witnesses denomination, but Egyptian monotheism and New Age concepts such as the Akashic records are used as metaphors as well. Jazzier than any of his previous work, it was met with mixed reactions. Some fans saw the album as a musical and spiritual evolution for Prince.

The Rainbow Children was released through the independent distributor Redline Entertainment. At Prince's decision, it received minimal promotion, as he wanted to focus more on the music and avoid commercialism. The album sold 158,000 copies in US stores as of summer 2007, with an estimated 560,000 copies worldwide.

The album also had a dedicated promotional website that offered the tracks "She Loves Me 4 Me" and "Mellow" as free MP3 downloads. The domain is currently for sale.

The album cover features Cbabi Bayoc's "The Reine Keis Quintet". Prince favored the painting of a women's band, as he was backed by an all-female ensemble.

== Track listing ==
All songs written and produced by Prince.

The Rainbow Children track listing
No.	Title	Length
1.	"Rainbow Children"	10:03
2.	"Muse 2 the Pharaoh"	4:21
3.	"Digital Garden"	4:07
4.	"The Work, pt. 1"	4:28
5.	"Everywhere"	2:55
6.	"The Sensual Everafter"	2:58
7.	"Mellow"	4:24
8.	"1+1+1 Is 3"	5:17
9.	"Deconstruction"	2:00
10.	"Wedding Feast"	0:54
11.	"She Loves Me 4 Me"	2:49
12.	"Family Name"	8:17
13.	"The Everlasting Now"	8:18
14.	"Last December"	7:58
15.	"Untitled"	0:04
16.	"Untitled"	0:04
17.	"Untitled"	0:04
18.	"Untitled"	0:04
19.	"Untitled"	0:04
20.	"Untitled"	0:08
21.	"Last December (Reprise)"	0:38
Total length:		68:49

Additional notes:

- Tracks 15–21 are all hidden tracks and are all silent with the exception of track 21, which gradually fades in to the repetition of the word "one" being sung.

== Personnel ==
- Prince – lead and backing vocals, electric guitars, Fender Rhodes piano, Yamaha Motif 6, Korg Trident, bass guitar, drums, electronic percussion
- Najee – Soprano saxophone, flute
- John Blackwell – drums, cowbell and Roland V-Drums (1–9, 11–14)
- Larry Graham – bass guitar (4, 14)

== Charts ==
2001 weekly chart performance for The Rainbow Children
Chart (2001)	Peak position
French Albums (SNEP)	78
Swiss Albums (Schweizer Hitparade)	74
US Billboard 200	109
US Independent Albums (Billboard)	4

2020 weekly chart performance for The Rainbow Children
Chart (2020)	Peak position
Austrian Albums (Ö3 Austria)	60
Dutch Albums (Album Top 100)	28
French Albums (SNEP)	75
German Albums (Offizielle Top 100)	29
Scottish Albums (Official Charts)	35
Swiss Albums (Schweizer Hitparade)	30
