= NPG Music Club =

NPG Music Club was the official website for Prince from 2001 to 2006, and was named after Prince's New Power Generation band. Based on being one of the first mainstream artists to use the internet as an independent music distribution hub, Prince won a Webby Lifetime Achievement Award for the site in 2006.

Membership was either $7.77 for a Basic Monthly Membership or $99 for a Premium Annual Membership. Basic Monthly Membership entitled members to a minimum of three new Prince songs each month, often accompanied by corresponding music videos, and a free one-hour radio show (podcast) hosted by Prince and other NPG members. The podcasts featured music, commentary and original skits. Premium Annual Membership were additionally entitled to more downloads, preferred seating at all Prince concerts, and VIP passes to all after shows and parties. Members also received a free copy of the limited Rave In2 the Joy Fantastic album.

During the second year of the Club, Prince changed the subscription model to mailing out four exclusive CDs throughout the year to members. The CDs for that year were One Nite Alone and the three-disc One Nite Alone... Live! box set. Members also got a free download of Prince's instrumental Xpectation album at the end of the year. Presale concert tickets continued to be offered exclusively to members.

Entering into its third year, Prince lowered the membership price to $25 for a lifetime membership. Instead of CDs or included downloads, Prince switched to selling downloads in the Musicology Download Store that were discounted for members. Presale concert tickets for the best seats on his Musicology Tour were also made available exclusively to members.

The site had around 400,000 members. It opened on February 14, 2001 and closed on July 4, 2006. Prince replaced the site with 3121.com.

== Webby Award ==
Prince won a Webby Lifetime Achievement Award in 2006, largely because of the NPG Music Club. Tiffany Shlain, founder of the awards, described Prince as a "musical genius" and "a visionary, who recognized early on that the Web would completely change how we experience music." Prince accepted his Webby Award personally in New York. Following the tradition of the awards in which each winner must only use five words as an acceptance speech, his speech was, "Everything you think is true." He performed an acoustic version of "Don't Play Me" at the ceremony. The NPG Music Club won its own, separate Webby Award that year for Best Celebrity/Fan site. Sam Jennings, the site's webmaster, accepted the award at the ceremony and gave his five word speech, "Prince says eliminate the middle-man."

== Lawsuit ==
HM Publishing Holdings, a publishing company in England, filed a trademark lawsuit against the site on July 3, 2006, claiming that NPG Music Club infringed on the name of their science book division the Nature Publishing Group (NPG). Prince closed the site 24 hours later. David Schelzel, Prince's attorney, said "Prince's use of the NPG...trademarks is no way in jeopardy", and stated Prince had permission from the U.S. Patent and Trademark Office to use the name. Despite these events occurring on the same day, Prince's attorney has called it pure coincidence and stated that the site did not close due to the trademark dispute.

== See also ==
- List of music released from NPG Music Club
