= Paisley Park =

Home and recording studio of Prince, now a museum

Coordinates: 44.8615°N 93.5606°W

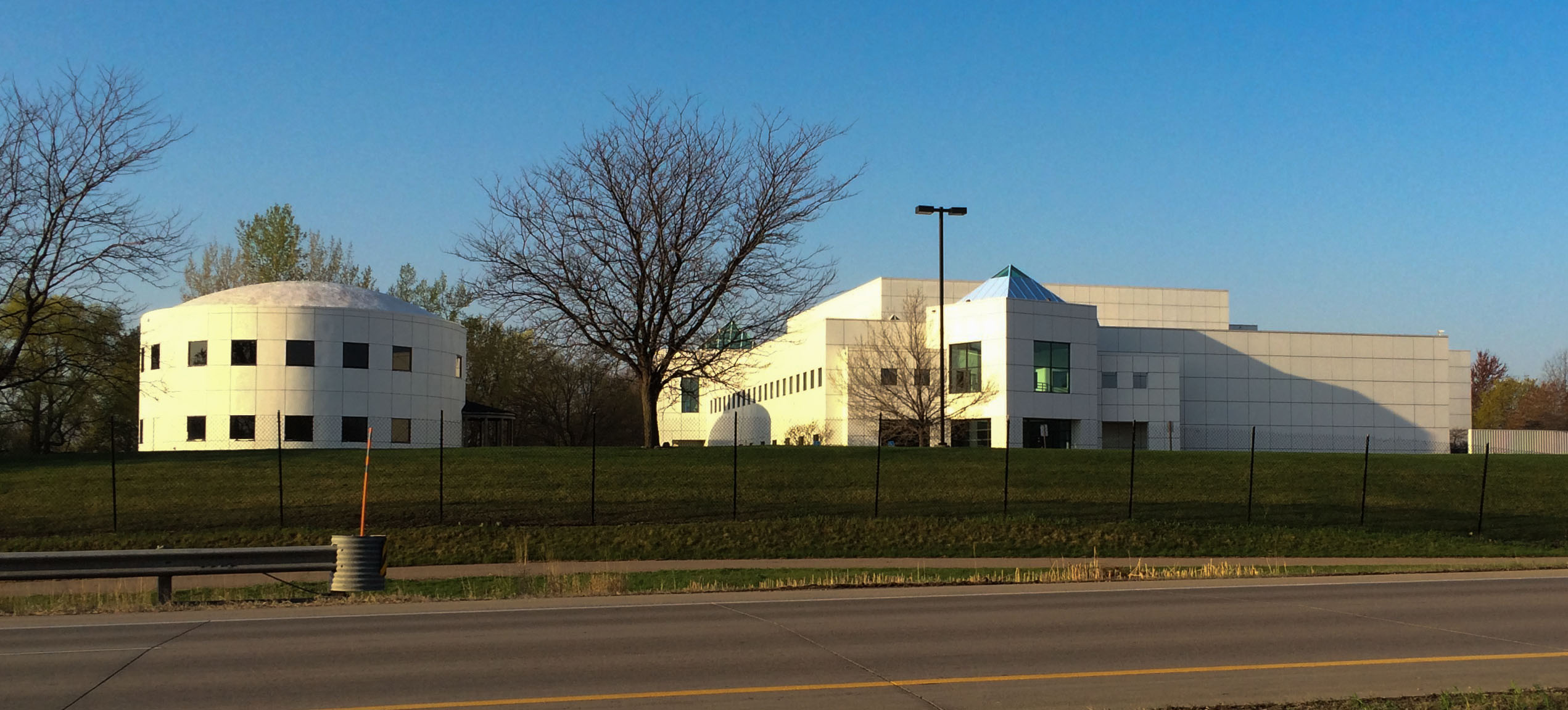
- Paisley Park in 2015
- Established: September 11, 1987; 39 years ago
- Location: 7801 Audubon Rd; Chanhassen, Minnesota, U.S. 55317
- Website: paisleypark.com

Paisley Park is a 65,000-square-foot (6,000 m^{2}) estate in Chanhassen, Minnesota, United States, once owned by American musician Prince. It was opened to the public as a museum in October 2016. Many of Prince’s later albums were recorded at the estate.

== History ==
Construction of the $10 million complex began in January 1986, and officially opened on September 11, 1987. Designed by architecture firm BOTO Design Inc., of Santa Monica, California, the main designers were architect Bret Thoeny and acoustician Marshall Long. The complex shares its name with Prince's 1985 single, "Paisley Park".

The Paisley Park studio complex totalled 65,000 square feet (6,000 m^{2}) by the early 1990s, and includes four recording studios, a 12,500-square-foot (1,160 m^{2}) sound stage, a video editing suite, rehearsal room, offices, tenant space, and an underground parking garage. Other amenities include an outdoor basketball court, and living quarters.

Paisley Park's four recording studios are designated A, B, C, and D. Studio A is a 1,500-square-foot (140 m^{2}) space and originally utilized a 48-channel mixing console, which was later replaced by a 64-channel SSL 6000E. Studio B is a 1,000-square-foot (93 m^{2}) space that was, per Prince's specifications, patterned after Sunset Sound's Studio 3, with a custom-built Automated Processes, Inc. API mixing console. Studio C has a 36-input Soundcraft TS24 console, and Studio D is a small DAW-based room.

Initially a private studio used by Prince and Paisley Park Records artists like The Time, Carmen Electra, Jill Jones, Sheila E. and others, Paisley Park's production facilities were used by numerous artists, including Tevin Campbell, Martika, Fine Young Cannibals, Barry Manilow, Steve Miller, Bee Gees, Chris Mars, BoDeans, Madonna, Bob Mould, George Clinton, George Benson, Stone Temple Pilots, Stevie Wonder, R.E.M., and A-ha.

After the Paisley Park Records label folded in 1994, Prince continued to record at Paisley Park Studios, eventually living there in the final years of his life. He intended to establish Paisley Park as a public venue like Graceland. He was found dead in his estate's elevator on April 21, 2016.

In the basement of Paisley Park, there is a vault that held unreleased material, hundreds of hours of live recordings, music videos, and unheard songs. The contents of the vault have been since removed and relocated to a studio in Los Angeles to be restored, remastered, and stored in climate-controlled conditions to be used for later releases.

An urn in the shape of Paisley Park, which contains Prince's ashes, was on display in Paisley Park's main entrance for a period of time after his death; after being moved into the vault, the urn was temporarily brought back out in 2021 for the fifth anniversary of his death, only to be removed once again.

== Museum ==
After Prince's death, Paisley Park was turned into a museum open to the public, and tours of the Paisley Park Museum started in October 2016. Graceland Holdings, the company that has managed Elvis Presley's Graceland since 1982, organizes the tours. Tours include recording studios, soundstages, and artifacts from Prince's personal archives.

== Albums recorded at Paisley Park ==
Prince

- Lovesexy (1988)
- Batman (1989)
- Graffiti Bridge (1990)
- Diamonds and Pearls (1991)
- Love Symbol (1992)
- Come (1994)
- The Black Album (1994)
- The Gold Experience (1995)
- Chaos and Disorder (1996)
- Emancipation (1996)
- The Truth (1998)
- Rave Un2 the Joy Fantastic (1999)
- The Rainbow Children (2001)
- One Nite Alone... (2002)
- Xpectation (2003)
- N.E.W.S. (2003)
- Musicology (2004)
- 3121 (2006)
- Planet Earth (2007)
- Lotusflow3r (2009)
- MPLSOUND (2009)
- 20Ten (2010)
- Plectrumelectrum (2014)
- Art Official Age (2014)
- Hit n Run Phase One (2015)
- Hit n Run Phase Two (2015)
- Welcome 2 America (2021)

== See also ==
- List of music museums
