= List of awards and nominations received by Prince =

Prince awards and nominations
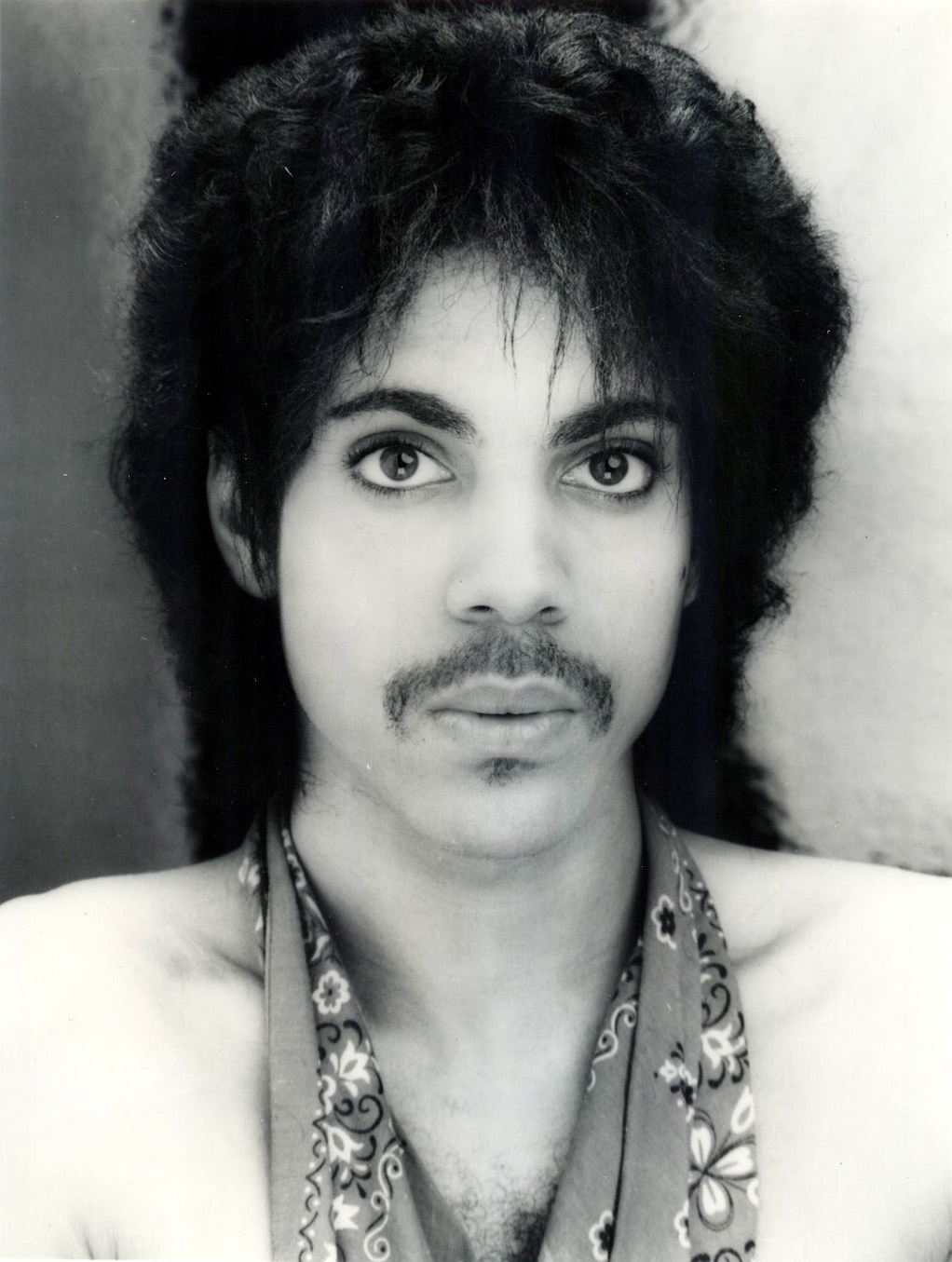
- Prince in 1980
Awards and nominations
Award	Wins	Nominations
Academy Awards	1	1
Golden Globe Awards	1	2
Grammy Awards	7	32
MTV Video Music Awards	4	12

Totals (Note: Certain award groups do not simply award one winner. They acknowledge several different recipients, have runners-up, and have third place. Since this is a specific recognition and is different from losing an award, runner-up mentions are considered wins in this award tally. For simplification and to avoid errors, each award in this list has been presumed to have had a prior nomination.)
- Wins: 63
- Nominations: 170

Prince was an American singer and songwriter. Throughout his career, he received 63 major awards from 170 nominations. Often credited as one of the greatest musicians of his generation, he pioneered the Minneapolis sound and was influential in the evolution of various other genres. He was known for his eclectic work across multiple genres, flamboyant and androgynous persona, and wide vocal range from falsetto to baritone, and rapid, seemingly effortless shifts of register.

Prince won his first awards in 1984 with the release of his double album 1999 two years prior. With the release of Purple Rain—a soundtrack album for the 1984 film of the same name—he won numerous awards, including an Academy Award, multiple American Music Awards, a Grammy Award, and several others. He continued to win awards throughout his career, including seven Grammy Awards, four MTV Video Music Awards, and numerous posthumous awards.

== Awards and nominations ==
List of award nominations, with the year of ceremony, nominee or work, category, and result
Award	Year	Nominee/Work	Category	Result	Ref.
Academy Awards	1985	Purple Rain	Best Original Song Score	Won	
American Music Awards	1984	Prince	Favorite Soul/R&B Male Artist	Nominated	
American Music Awards	1984	1999	Favorite Soul/R&B Album	Nominated	
American Music Awards	1985	Prince	Favorite Pop/Rock Male Artist	Nominated	
American Music Awards	1985	Prince	Favorite Pop/Rock Male Video Artist	Nominated	
American Music Awards	1985	Prince	Favorite Soul/R&B Male Artist	Nominated	
American Music Awards	1985	Prince	Favorite Soul/R&B Male Video Artist	Nominated	
American Music Awards	1985	"When Doves Cry"	Favorite Pop/Rock Single	Nominated	
American Music Awards	1985	"When Doves Cry"	Favorite Pop/Rock Video	Nominated	
American Music Awards	1985	"When Doves Cry"	Favorite Soul/R&B Single	Won	
American Music Awards	1985	"When Doves Cry"	Favorite Soul/R&B Video	Nominated	
American Music Awards	1985	Purple Rain	Favorite Pop/Rock Album	Won	
American Music Awards	1985	Purple Rain	Favorite Soul/R&B Album	Won	
American Music Awards	1986	Prince	Favorite Pop/Rock Male Artist	Nominated	
American Music Awards	1986	Prince	Favorite Soul/R&B Male Artist	Nominated	
American Music Awards	1986	Prince	Favorite Soul/R&B Male Video Artist	Nominated	
American Music Awards	1987	"Kiss"	Favorite Soul/R&B Single	Nominated	
American Music Awards	1990	Prince	Favorite Soul/R&B Male Artist	Nominated	
American Music Awards	1990	Prince	Achievement	Honoree	
American Music Awards	1992	Prince	Favorite Soul/R&B Male Artist	Nominated	
American Music Awards	1995	Prince	Favorite Soul/R&B Male Artist	Nominated	
American Music Awards	1995	Prince	Merit	Honoree	
American Music Awards	2004	Prince	Favorite Soul/R&B Male Artist	Nominated	
American Music Awards	2004	Musicology	Favorite Soul/R&B Album	Nominated	
American Music Awards	2016	Purple Rain	Favorite Soundtrack	Won	
ASCAP Awards	1990	"Partyman" (from Batman)	Most Performed Songs from Motion Pictures	Won	
ASCAP Awards	1991	"Thieves in the Temple" (from Graffiti Bridge)	Most Performed Songs from Motion Pictures	Won	
ASCAP Pop Music Awards	1986	"Raspberry Beret"	Most Performed Songs	Won	
ASCAP Pop Music Awards	1986	"I Feel for You"	Most Performed Songs	Won	
ASCAP Pop Music Awards	1986	"Purple Rain"	Most Performed Songs	Won	
ASCAP Pop Music Awards	1986	"When Doves Cry"	Most Performed Songs	Won	
ASCAP Pop Music Awards	1987	"Kiss"	Most Performed Songs	Won	
ASCAP Pop Music Awards	1989	"U Got the Look"	Most Performed Songs	Won	
ASCAP Pop Music Awards	1991	"Nothing Compares 2 U"	Most Performed Songs	Won	
ASCAP Pop Music Awards	1991	"Kiss"	Most Performed Songs	Won	
ASCAP Pop Music Awards	1992	"Round and Round"	Most Performed Songs	Won	
ASCAP Pop Music Awards	1994	"The Most Beautiful Girl in the World"	Most Performed Songs	Won	
ASCAP Pop Music Awards	2004	"'03 Bonnie & Clyde"	Most Performed Songs	Won	
BET Awards	2005	Prince	Best Male R&B Artist	Nominated	
BET Awards	2006	Prince	Best Male R&B Artist	Won	
BET Awards	2010	Prince	Lifetime Achievement Award	Honoree	
Billboard Music Awards	1994	Prince	Top R&B Singles Artist - Male	Nominated	
Billboard Music Awards	2013	Prince	Icon Award	Honoree	
Billboard Music Awards	2017	Prince	Top Billboard 200 Artist	Nominated	
Billboard Music Awards	2017	Prince	Top Song Sales Artist	Nominated	
Billboard Music Awards	2017	Purple Rain	Top Soundtrack/Cast Album	Nominated	
Brit Awards	1985	Purple Rain	Soundtrack/Cast Recording	Won	
Brit Awards	1985	Prince	International Artist	Won	
Brit Awards	1989	Prince	International Male Solo Artist	Nominated	
Brit Awards	1990	Prince	International Solo Artist	Nominated	
Brit Awards	1990	"Batdance"	British Video of the Year	Nominated	
Brit Awards	1990	Batman	Soundtrack/Cast Recording	Won	
Brit Awards	1991	Prince	International Male Solo Artist	Nominated	
Brit Awards	1992	Prince	International Solo Artist	Won	
Brit Awards	1993	Prince	International Solo Artist	Won	
Brit Awards	1995	Prince	International Male Solo Artist	Won	
Brit Awards	1996	Prince	International Male Solo Artist	Won	
Brit Awards	1997	Prince	International Male Solo Artist	Nominated	
Edison Awards	1987	Parade	Best Pop International	Won	
Edison Awards	1989	Lovesexy	Best Pop International	Won	
GAFFA Awards	1991	"Cream"	Best Foreign Song	Nominated	
GAFFA Awards	2004	Prince	Best Foreign Male Act	Nominated	
Genesis Awards	2000	Rave Un2 the Joy Fantastic (liner notes)	The Dolly Green Special Achievement Award	Honoree	
Golden Globe Awards	1985	"When Doves Cry" (from Purple Rain)	Best Original Song	Nominated	
Golden Globe Awards	2007	"The Song of the Heart" (from Happy Feet)	Best Original Song	Won	
Golden Raspberry Awards	1985	"Sex Shooter"	Worst Original Song	Nominated	
Golden Raspberry Awards	1987	Under the Cherry Moon	Worst Actor	Won	
Golden Raspberry Awards	1987	Under the Cherry Moon	Worst Director	Won	
Golden Raspberry Awards	1987	"Kiss"	Worst Original Song	Won	
Golden Raspberry Awards	1990	Under the Cherry Moon	Worst Actor of the Decade	Nominated	
Golden Raspberry Awards	1990	Under the Cherry Moon	Worst New Star of the Decade	Nominated	
Golden Raspberry Awards	1991	Graffiti Bridge	Worst Actor	Nominated	
Golden Raspberry Awards	1991	Graffiti Bridge	Worst Director	Nominated	
Golden Raspberry Awards	1991	Graffiti Bridge	Worst Screenplay	Nominated	
Golden Raspberry Awards	2000	Prince	Worst Actor of the Century	Nominated	
Grammy Awards	1984	"International Lover"	Best Male R&B Vocal Performance	Nominated	
Grammy Awards	1984	1999	Best Male Pop Vocal Performance	Nominated	
Grammy Awards	1985	Purple Rain	Album of the Year	Nominated	
Grammy Awards	1985	Purple Rain	Best Rock Performance by a Duo or Group with Vocal	Won	
Grammy Awards	1985	Purple Rain	Best Score Soundtrack for Visual Media	Won	
Grammy Awards	1985	"I Feel for You"	Best R&B Song	Won	
Grammy Awards	1985	Prince and the Revolution	Producer of the Year, Non-Classical	Nominated	
Grammy Awards	1986	Prince and the Revolution: Live	Best Music Film	Nominated	
Grammy Awards	1987	"Kiss"	Best R&B Performance by a Duo or Group with Vocals	Won	
Grammy Awards	1987	"Kiss"	Best R&B Song	Nominated	
Grammy Awards	1988	Sign o' the Times	Album of the Year	Nominated	
Grammy Awards	1988	"U Got the Look"	Best R&B Performance by a Duo or Group with Vocals	Nominated	
Grammy Awards	1988	"U Got the Look"	Best R&B Song	Nominated	
Grammy Awards	1990	Batman	Best Male Pop Vocal Performance	Nominated	
Grammy Awards	1990	"Batdance"	Best Male R&B Vocal Performance	Nominated	
Grammy Awards	1990	"Partyman"	Best Song Written for Visual Media	Nominated	
Grammy Awards	1990	Prince	Producer of the Year, Non-Classical	Nominated	
Grammy Awards	1991	"Nothing Compares 2 U"	Song of the Year	Nominated	
Grammy Awards	1992	"Gett Off"	Best R&B Performance by a Duo or Group with Vocals	Nominated	
Grammy Awards	1993	"Diamonds and Pearls"	Best Pop Performance by a Duo or Group with Vocals	Nominated	
Grammy Awards	1995	"The Most Beautiful Girl in the World"	Best Male Pop Vocal Performance	Nominated	
Grammy Awards	1996	"I Hate U"	Best Male R&B Vocal Performance	Nominated	
Grammy Awards	1996	The Gold Experience	Best R&B Album	Nominated	
Grammy Awards	2004	N·E·W·S	Best Pop Instrumental Album	Nominated	
Grammy Awards	2005	"Cinnamon Girl"	Best Male Pop Vocal Performance	Nominated	
Grammy Awards	2005	"Call My Name"	Best Male R&B Vocal Performance	Won	
Grammy Awards	2005	"Call My Name"	Best R&B Song	Nominated	
Grammy Awards	2005	"Musicology"	Best Traditional R&B Performance	Won	
Grammy Awards	2005	Musicology	Best R&B Album	Nominated	
Grammy Awards	2007	"Black Sweat"	Best Male R&B Vocal Performance	Nominated	
Grammy Awards	2007	"Black Sweat"	Best R&B Song	Nominated	
Grammy Awards	2007	"Beautiful, Loved and Blessed"	Best R&B Performance by a Duo or Group with Vocals	Nominated	
Grammy Awards	2007	"3121"	Best Urban/Alternative Performance	Nominated	
Grammy Awards	2007	3121	Best R&B Album	Nominated	
Grammy Awards	2008	"Future Baby Mama"	Best Male R&B Vocal Performance	Won	
Grammy Awards	2008	"The Song of the Heart" (from Happy Feet)	Best Song Written for Visual Media	Nominated	
Grammy Awards	2008	1999	Hall of Fame	Inducted	
Grammy Awards	2010	"Dreamer"	Best Solo Rock Vocal Performance	Nominated	
Grammy Awards	2011	Purple Rain	Hall of Fame	Inducted	
Grammy Awards	2017	Hit n Run Phase Two	Best Engineered Album, Non-Classical	Nominated	
Grammy Awards	2017	Sign o' the Times	Hall of Fame	Inducted	
Grammy Awards	2025	Prince	Lifetime Achievement Award	Honoree	
MTV Europe Music Awards	1994	Prince	Best Male	Nominated	
MTV Video Music Awards	1985	"When Doves Cry"	Best Choreography in a Video	Nominated	
MTV Video Music Awards	1986	"Raspberry Beret"	Best Choreography in a Video	Won	
MTV Video Music Awards	1988	"U Got the Look"	Best Male Video	Won	
MTV Video Music Awards	1988	"U Got the Look"	Best Stage Performance in a Video	Won	
MTV Video Music Awards	1988	"U Got the Look"	Best Choreography in a Video	Nominated	
MTV Video Music Awards	1988	"U Got the Look"	Best Editing in a Video	Nominated	
MTV Video Music Awards	1989	"I Wish U Heaven"	Best Special Effects in a Video	Nominated	
MTV Video Music Awards	1990	"Batdance" (from Batman)	Best Video from a Film	Nominated	
MTV Video Music Awards	1992	"Cream"	Best Dance Video	Won	
MTV Video Music Awards	1993	"7"	Best R&B Video	Nominated	
MTV Video Music Awards	2004	"Musicology"	Best Male Video	Nominated	
MTV Video Music Awards	2006	"Black Sweat"	Best Cinematography in a Video	Nominated	
NAACP Image Awards	1984	Purple Rain	Outstanding Actor in a Motion Picture	Won	
NME Awards	1988	"Sign o' the Times"	Best Single	Won	
NME Awards	2018	Purple Rain	Reissue of the Year	Nominated	
NME Awards	2020	1999	Reissue of the Year	Nominated	
NME Awards	2020	The Beautiful Ones	Best Music Book	Nominated	
Online Music Awards	2000	Prince	Internet Hero	Nominated	
Porin	1994	Diamonds and Pearls Video Collection	Best International Video	Won	
Premios Ondas	2016	Prince	Special Jury Award	Won	
Rock and Roll Hall of Fame	2004	Prince	Performer	Inducted	
Smash Hits Poll Winners Party	1989	Prince	Best Male Solo Singer	Nominated	
Smash Hits Poll Winners Party	1990	Prince	Best Male Solo Singer	Nominated	
Smash Hits Poll Winners Party	1991	Prince	Best Male Solo Singer	Nominated	
Smash Hits Poll Winners Party	1994	Prince	Best Male Solo Singer	Nominated	
Songwriters Hall of Fame	2024	Prince	Songwriters Hall of Fame	Inducted	
Soul Train Music Awards	1987	"Kiss"	Best R&B/Soul Single – Male	Nominated	
Soul Train Music Awards	1988	"U Got the Look"	Best R&B/Soul Single – Male	Nominated	
Soul Train Music Awards	1988	Sign o' the Times	Best R&B/Soul Album – Male	Nominated	
Soul Train Music Awards	1990	"Batdance"	Best Video of the Year	Nominated	
Soul Train Music Awards	1992	Diamonds and Pearls	Best R&B/Soul Album – Group, Band or Duo	Nominated	
Soul Train Music Awards	1992	Prince	Heritage Award – Career Achievement	Honoree	
Soul Train Music Awards	1993	Love Symbol	Best R&B/Soul Album – Group, Band or Duo	Nominated	
Soul Train Music Awards	1994	The Hits/The B-Sides	Best R&B/Soul Album – Male	Nominated	
Soul Train Music Awards	1998	Emancipation	Best R&B/Soul Album – Male	Nominated	
Soul Train Music Awards	2000	Prince	Artist of the Decade for Extraordinary Artistic Achievements – Male	Honoree	
Soul Train Music Awards	2005	"Call My Name"	Best R&B/Soul Single – Male	Nominated	
Soul Train Music Awards	2005	Musicology	Best R&B/Soul Album – Male	Nominated	
UK Music Hall of Fame	2006	Prince	Lifetime Contribution to Music	Inducted	
Webby Awards	2014	3rdeyegirl	Web: Celebrity/Fan	Won	
Webby Awards	2019	Prince Discography	Websites: Music	Nominated	
Webby Awards	2019	"Mary Don't You Weep"	Best Music Video	Won	
World Soundtrack Awards	2004	Purple Rain	Major Contribution to the Art of Film Music and Sound	Honored	
Žebřík Music Awards	1996	Prince	Best International Instrumentalist	Nominated	
Žebřík Music Awards	2004	Prince	Best International Male	Nominated	
Žebřík Music Awards	2004	Prince	Best International Personality	Nominated	
Žebřík Music Awards	2005	Prince	Best International Personality	Nominated	

== Other honors ==
Prince was honorarily awarded the Doctor of Humane Letters on June 9, 2016, by the University of Minnesota.
