= List of people from Tangier =

This is a list of people from Tangier:

== Born ==
- Abdullah al-Ghumari – Muslim cleric
- Ibn Battuta – Berber scholar and traveller
- Ralph Benmergui – Canadian TV and radio host at the Canadian Broadcasting Corporation
- Alexandre Rey Colaço – Portuguese pianist
- Karim Debbagh – Moroccan film producer
- Roger Elliott – first British Governor of Gibraltar
- Bibiana Fernández – Spanish actress and model
- Antonio Fuentes – painter described as the 'Picasso of Tangier'
- Sanaa Hamri – Moroccan music video director
- Emmanuel Hocquard – French poet
- Jean-Luc Mélenchon – French politician, currently MEP
- Zakaria Ramhani – Moroccan visual artist
- Alexander Spotswood – American Lieutenant-Colonel and Lieutenant Governor of Virginia
- Heinz Tietjen – German music composer
- Samuel Toledano – Spanish-Jewish leader
- Abderrahmane Youssoufi – former Prime Minister of Morocco

== Settled or sojourned ==
- Lancelot Addison – English chaplain and the author of West Barbary, or a Short Narrative of the Revolutions of the Kingdoms of Fex and Morocco (1671)
- José Luis Alcaine – Spanish-born cinematographer
- William Bayer – American crime fiction writer, author of the novel Tangier
- Bill Bird – American journalist and the founder of Tangier Gazette
- Jane Bowles – American writer; wife of Paul Bowles
- Paul Bowles – American writer and composer; lived in Tangier for 52 years and died there
- Claudio Bravo – painter
- William S. Burroughs – American novelist, essayist, social critic, painter and spoken word performer; lived in Tangier four years
- Truman Capote – American novelist and writer, who visited Tangier
- João de Castro – Portuguese naval officer and fourth viceroy of the Portuguese Indies
- Ira Cohen – American poet, publisher, photographer and filmmaker; published one issue of a magazine called Gnaoua
- Eugène Delacroix – French Romantic painter
- Jim Ede – English art collector
- Malcolm Forbes – publisher of Forbes magazine
- Sean Gullette – American actor and writer
- Brion Gysin – English writer and painter
- Mohamed Hamri – Moroccan painter, described as the 'Picasso of Morocco'
- Walter Burton Harris – English journalist, writer, traveller and socialite
- Friedrich von Holstein – German statesman
- Barbara Hutton – wealthy American socialite dubbed by the media as the "Poor Little Rich Girl" because of her troubled life, lived in Tangier during the summer months from 1947 to 1975
- Gavin Lambert – American (British-born) biographer, novelist and Hollywood screenwriter(and close friend of Paul Bowles), who lived 15 years in Tangier
- Bernard-Henri Lévy – French journalist and intellectual
- Henri Matisse – French painter
- Joseph McPhillips III – American theater director and the headmaster of The American School of Tangier; died in Tangier
- Mohamed Mrabet – Moroccan storyteller
- Joe Orton – British playwright
- Ion Perdicaris – US-Greek playboy who was the centre of the Perdicaris incident, a kidnapping that aroused international conflict in 1904
- George John Pinwell – English painter
- Edward Reichmann – Austro-Hungarian and Canadian businessman
- Reichmann family (including Edward) – rich immigrant Jewish family from Austro-Hungary and Canada
- David Roberts – Scottish painter
- Yves Saint-Laurent – French fashion designer
- J. Slauerhoff – Dutch poet and novelist
- Josep Tapiró Baró – Spanish painter
- Kenneth Williams – British humourist
- Paula Wolfert – American food writer, author of two Moroccan cookbooks, lived in Tangier for eight years

== Died ==
- Abdullah al-Ghumari – Muslim cleric
- Ibn Battuta – 14th-century traveller and diarist; born in Tangier in 1304 and is said to have been buried there in 1368
- Paul Bowles – expatriate American writer and composer
- Mohamed Choukri – Moroccan novelist; died in Rabat, buried in the Marshan, Tangier
- George Elliott – probably the illegitimate son of Richard Eliot; Chirurgeon to the Earl of Teviot's Regiment at Tangier
- George Fleetwood – one of the regicides of Charles I; brought to trial and sentenced to imprisonment in the Tower of London; may have been transported to Tangier
- Paul Lukas – Hungarian actor
- Joseph McPhillips III – American theater director and headmaster of the American School of Tangier
- John Middleton, 1st Earl of Middleton – commander-in-chief of the troops in Scotland under the reign of Charles II
