= Musicology (disambiguation) =

Musicology is the scholarly study of music. It may also refer to:

- Musicology (album), a 2004 album by Prince
- "Musicology" (song), the title song from the Prince album
- Musicology Tour (also known as Musicology Live2004ever), a 2004 North American tour by Prince
