= Sanaa Hamri =

Moroccan-American film, television and music video director

- سناء حمري
- Born: November 19, 1977 (age 48); Tangier, Morocco
- Education: American School of Tangier
- Occupations: Film director, music video director, television director, television producer
- Years active: 2000–present
- Known for: Music videos, Empire
- Notable work: Something New
- Children: 1
- Parent(s): Mohamed Hamri; Blanca Hamri

Sanaa Hamri (Arabic: سناء حمري; born November 19, 1977) is a Moroccan-American film, television, and music video director. She has directed music videos for musicians including Prince, Mariah Carey, Christina Aguilera, and Sting. She is known for her 2010 film Just Wright and the 2008 movie The Sisterhood of the Traveling Pants 2, as well as for her music video for the Nicki Minaj song "Super Bass". Hamri made her directorial debut in 2006 with the romantic comedy Something New.

Scholar Shelley Cobb has credited Hamri's work as "[offering] alternative representations of black women that productively engage with and even challenge usual stereotypes, even as they use and conform to mainstream cinematic conventions".

== Early life ==
Hamri was born in Tangier, Morocco, to Moroccan Muslim Mohamed Hamri and Jewish Moroccan Blanche "Blanca" Hamri. Her father came from the town of Jajouka and was a painter and author. Hamri's mother was a teacher. Both of Hamri's parents were part of the creative community in Morocco, which was made up of ex-pats such as Paul Bowles, William Burroughs, Brion Gysin, Timothy Leary, Ted Morgan and Tennessee Williams. In fact, Hamri's mother was the long-time secretary to Joseph A. McPhillips III, the headmaster of the American School of Tangier, who was later in charge of Bowles' estate.

Hamri attended the American School of Tangier, where her mother worked. The school was not gender balanced: at one point, Hamri was the only girl on the soccer team and eventually, the sole female student enrolled at her high school. In 1992, Hamri moved to the United States after receiving a scholarship to attend Sarah Lawrence College in Bronxville, New York. In college, she studied theatre arts and pursued acting. Hamri spent her junior year of college in Paris, and in 1996 graduated from Sarah Lawrence College.

== Career ==
=== Early career ===
After college, Hamri moved to New York City in order to pursue an acting career. Hamri struggled through auditions and unemployment before she decided to try working in the production side of the business. She taught herself filmmaking skills firsthand, such as how to use an Avid editing machine. Hamri then moved from seeking an acting career to making videos and was eventually noticed by cinematographer, Malik Hassan Sayeed. During this time she worked as an editor of music videos at a post-production studio.

Sayeed, who also produced videos, was impressed by Hamri's work and showed it to Mariah Carey, who subsequently hired Hamri to direct a music video. Sayeed also gave Hamri her first editing job for a reggae/hip-hop fusion group called Born Jamericans. Hamri then began to take on more work as she became better known.

=== Music videos ===
Hamri's videos include but are not limited to Jadakiss's "U Make Me Wanna", Prince's "Musicology", Kelly Rowland's "Stole" and Mariah Carey's "Crybaby", "Bringin' On the Heartbreak" and "Don't Stop (Funkin' 4 Jamaica)" and Carey's unreleased video for "Last Night a DJ Saved My Life". She has directed videos for Nicki Minaj, Lenny Kravitz, Joss Stone, Sting, Common, Raven-Symoné, Eric Benet, Amel Larrieux, Jay-Z, A*Teens, and Christina Aguilera. She also directed the music video for Greyson Chance's "Waiting Outside The Lines".

In 2011 Hamri shot a music video for Nicki Minaj's single "Super Bass." In the video Minaj is portrayed as a "Black Harajuku Barbie", an element which, according to Nina Cartier, satirizes white beauty standards.

=== Film ===
According to Shelley Cobb, Hamri's films are often overlooked in "both contemporary black cinema and contemporary women's cinema" because they sometimes fall in the "broad chick-flick category". She further opines that Hamri's films challenge the "structural silence imposed on black women.

In March 2005, production began on Hamri's first feature, the Focus Features film, Something New, a romantic comedy starring Sanaa Lathan (Brown Sugar, Alien vs. Predator) and Simon Baker (The Ring Two, L.A. Confidential). The film was released on January 29, 2006, and produced by Stephanie Allain through her company, Homegrown Pictures, along with the mini-major Gramercy. The film grossed $11,483,669 million and received generally positive reviews. Cobb described the movie as a "feature film about a black woman, written, directed, and produced by a black woman" which she considered "rare". Hamri's second film as director was 2008's The Sisterhood of the Traveling Pants 2, with America Ferrera, Amber Tamblyn, Alexis Bledel and Blake Lively, which was released on August 6, 2008. The film grossed $44,352,417 and received generally favorable reviews. She went on to direct Just Wright with Queen Latifah and Common, which was released on May 14, 2010. The film grossed $21,570,263 million and received mixed reviews.

=== Television ===
Along with directing feature film and music videos, Hamri has directed and produced multiple episodes of television shows Nashville, Shameless, Elementary, Desperate Housewives, Grey's Anatomy, along with single episodes of Men in Trees and Glee. She also directed Mariah Carey's live concert documentary, The Adventures of Mimi, and Prince's The Art of Musicology and Live at the Aladdin Las Vegas.

== Personal life ==
Hamri is multi-lingual as she speaks English, French, Spanish, and a Moroccan dialect she learned in her childhood. In 2000, Hamri had a daughter, Laila Hamri Fletcher, whose father is Loyst P. Fletcher, a Los Angeles attorney.

On being a non-white woman working in Hollywood, Hamri states: "I don't feel this huge weight on me by any means," continuing that she is "not an international person" and she wants to be a part of movies "that people from all walks of life can enjoy, or get something out of."

== Filmography ==
=== Films ===
- 2006: Something New
- 2008: The Sisterhood of the Traveling Pants 2
- 2010: Just Wright

=== Television ===
As director unless noted

- 1998: Mariah Carey: Around the World (TV Movie) – Editor
- 2004: Prince: The Art of Musicology (TV Special)
- 2007: Desperate Housewives (1 episode: "No Fits, No Fights, No Feuds")
- 2007: Men in Trees (1 episode: "The Indecent Proposal"
- 2009: Acceptance (TV Movie)
- 2010: Life Unexpected (1 episode: "Honeymoon Interrupted")
- 2012: Bounce (1 episode: "Pilot")
- 2012: 90210 (2 episodes: "Bride and Prejudice," "Hate 2 Love")
- 2013: Nashville (2 episodes: "I'm Sorry for You, My Friend," "My Heart Would Know")
- 2013: Lovestruck: The Musical (TV Movie)
- 2013: Hit the Floor (1 episode: "Pilot")
- 2013: Full Circle (1 episode: "Robbie & Celeste")
- 2014: Glee (1 episode: "New New York")
- 2013–2014: Elementary 4 episodes:
  - episode #16: "Details"
  - episode #29: "Ancient History"
  - episode #31: "The Marchioness"
  - episode #44: "No Lack of Void"
- 2014: Hemlock Grove 1 episode:
  - episode #18: "Hemlock Diego's Policy Player's Dream Book"
- 2014: Rectify (1 episode: "Weird as You")
- 2015–2019: Empire
  - Executive producer & Co-executive producer: 11 episodes:
  - episode #3: "The Devil Quotes Scripture"
  - episode #7: "Our Dancing Days"
  - episode #20: "My Bad Parts"
  - episode #22: "Et Tu, Brute?"
  - episode #27: "More Than Kin"
  - episode #30: "Past Is Prologue"
  - episode #31: "Light in Darkness"
  - episode #36: "Chimes at Midnight"
  - episode #39: "A Furnace for Your Foe"
  - episode #49: "Noble Memory"
  - episode #52: "Bleeding War"
  - episode #54: "Fortune Be Not Crost"
  - episode #57: "Slave to Memory"
  - episode #67: "Steal from the Thief"
  - episode #75: "Had It From My Father"
  - episode #85: "What Is Love"
  - episode #90: "Heart of Stone"
  - episode #94: "Cold Cold Man"
- 2011–2015: Shameless 4 episodes:
  - episode 11: "Daddyz Girl"
  - episode 35: "Order Room Service"
  - episode 39: "Like Father, Like Daughter"
  - episode 50: "I'm the Liver"
- 2015: Studio City (TV Movie)
- 2021: 9-1-1: Lone Star (2 episodes "Friends with Benefits", "Difficult Conversations")
- 2021: American Horror Stories ("BA'AL")
- 2023: The Wheel of Time - Director & Executive producer
- 2024: The Lord of the Rings: The Rings of Power (3 episodes)
  - episode #12: "Eldest" (co-directed with Louise Hooper)
  - episode #13: "Halls of Stone" (co-directed with Louise Hooper)
  - episode #14: "Where Is He?"

=== Music videos ===
- 1999: Mariah Carey – "Thank God I Found You"
- 2000: Mariah Carey feat. Snoop Dogg – "CryBaby"
- 2000: Mariah Carey – "Can't Take That Away (Mariah's Theme)"
- 2001: Mariah Carey feat. Mystikal – "Don't Stop (Funkin' 4 Jamaica)"
- 2001: Mariah Carey – "Last Night a DJ Saved My Life" (Unreleased)
- 2001: Case – "Missing You"
- 2001: Destiny's Child – "8 Days of Christmas"
- 2002: Kelly Rowland – "Stole"
- 2002: Common feat. Mary J. Blige – "Come Close"
- 2002: Jay-Z – "Song Cry"
- 2002: A*Teens – "Floorfiller"
- 2002: Destiny's Child – "Nasty Girl"
- 2002: Solange Knowles feat. N.O.R.E. – "Feelin' You (Part II)"
- 2002: India.Arie – "Little Things"
- 2003: Mariah Carey – "Bringin' On the Heartbreak"
- 2003: Prince – "Prince Live at the Aladdin Las Vegas"
- 2003: Seal – "Love's Divine"
- 2004: Jadakiss feat. Mariah Carey – "U Make Me Wanna"
- 2004: Jadakiss feat. Anthony Hamilton – "Why"
- 2004: Prince – "Musicology"
- 2004: Prince – "Call My Name"
- 2004: Raven-Symoné – "Backflip
- 2004: Amel Larrieux – "For Real"
- 2004: Mary J. Blige – "It's a Wrap"
- 2005: The Notorious B.I.G. feat. P. Diddy, Nelly, Jagged Edge & Avery Storm – "Nasty Girl"
- 2006: Prince – "Black Sweat"
- 2006: Prince – "Fury"
- 2006: Cham feat. Alicia Keys & Akon – "Ghetto Story"
- 2007: Musiq Soulchild – "B.U.D.D.Y."
- 2007: Joss Stone feat. Common – "Tell Me What We're Gonna Do Now"
- 2007: Mariah Carey – "The Adventures of Mimi"
- 2008: Prince – "Guitar"
- 2010: Greyson Chance – "Waiting Outside the Lines"
- 2011: Greyson Chance – "Unfriend You"
- 2011: Nicki Minaj – "Super Bass"
- 2011: Nicki Minaj feat. Rihanna – "Fly"
- 2011: Mariah Carey feat. Justin Bieber – "All I Want For Christmas Is You"
- 2011: Porcelain Black feat. Lil Wayne – "This Is What Rock n' Roll Looks Like"
- 2011: Lupe Fiasco feat. Skylar Grey – "Words I Never Said"
