= Music of The Lord of the Rings: The Rings of Power =

Ongoing television score

The Lord of the Rings: The Rings of Power
- Film score by Bear McCreary
- Genre: Orchestra; choir; world
- Language: English; Constructed languages
- Composed: July 2021 – present
- Recorded: Abbey Road; AIR; Synchron Stage Vienna; Miscellaneous
- Duration: 9 hours (season 1); 8 hours (season 2)

The music of the American fantasy television series The Lord of the Rings: The Rings of Power mostly consists of an original film score by Bear McCreary. The series is based on J. R. R. Tolkien's history of Middle-earth, primarily material from the appendices of the novel The Lord of the Rings (1954–55). It is set thousands of years before the novel and depicts the major events of Middle-earth's Second Age. The series was developed by J. D. Payne and Patrick McKay for the streaming service Amazon Prime Video.

McCreary was approached in 2019, and began writing themes or leitmotifs in July 2021. The series is not a continuation of Peter Jackson's The Lord of the Rings (2001–2003) and The Hobbit (2012–2014) film trilogies and McCreary was contractually prevented from quoting any of the themes that Howard Shore composed for those films. Despite this, he hoped to create musical continuity between his score and Shore's. McCreary eschewed the common industry practice of using other composers to write additional music, ensuring a consistent musical approach for the whole series. He composed nine hours of music for the first season and eight hours for the second. McCreary's score was recorded with orchestras, choirs singing in Tolkien's constructed languages, and specialty solo instruments. The series also features original diegetic music and songs, and a main title theme by Shore.

Soundtrack albums for each season have been released, along with additional albums featuring McCreary's full score for each episode. The score has received positive reviews from critics and several accolades, including a Primetime Creative Arts Emmy Award nomination and multiple wins at the International Film Music Critics Association Awards.

== Background ==
Amazon acquired the global television rights for J. R. R. Tolkien's The Lord of the Rings (1954–55) in November 2017. The company's streaming service, Prime Video, gave a multi-season commitment to a series based on the novel and its appendices, to be produced by Amazon Studios in association with New Line Cinema and in consultation with the Tolkien Estate. J. D. Payne and Patrick McKay were set as showrunners of the series, titled The Lord of the Rings: The Rings of Power, which is set in the Second Age of Middle-earth, thousands of years before Tolkien's The Hobbit (1937) and The Lord of the Rings. It follows a large cast of characters and covers all the major events of the Second Age from Tolkien's writings: the forging of the Rings of Power, the rise of the Dark Lord Sauron, the fall of the island kingdom of Númenor, and the last alliance between Elves and Men.

The series was originally expected to be a continuation of Peter Jackson's The Lord of the Rings (2001–2003) and The Hobbit (2012–2014) film trilogies, but Amazon later clarified that their deal with Tolkien's estate required them to keep the series distinct from the films. Despite this, musicians Plan 9—Janet Roddick, David Donaldson, and Steve Roche—and David Long returned from the films to provide music during filming for the first season, and Howard Shore, who composed the original scores for Jackson's films, also returned. Shore was first reported to be in discussions for the series in September 2020. He was said to be interested in developing musical themes but not necessarily composing the entire score. Shore was confirmed to be in talks a year later, when composer Bear McCreary was reported to be involved as well. A long-time fan of Tolkien's writings and Jackson's films, McCreary was first approached about working on the series by executive producer Lindsey Weber, who he worked with on the films 10 Cloverfield Lane (2016) and The Cloverfield Paradox (2018), in 2019. He was not hired until mid-2021 after the COVID-19 pandemic impacted the first season's production and delayed the producers' decision on who the composer would be. The hiring of Shore to write the main title theme and McCreary to compose the rest of the score was officially announced in July 2022. McCreary later confirmed that he was contractually prohibited from quoting any themes that Shore wrote for the films.

== Production ==
=== Composition ===
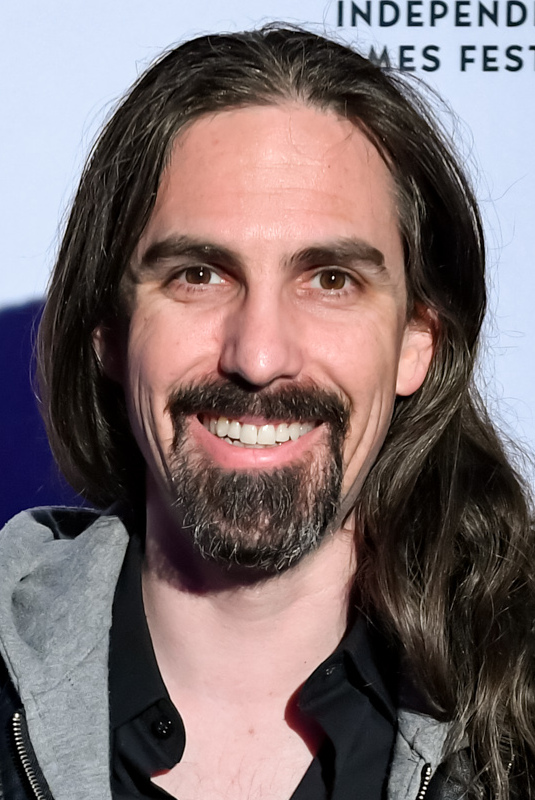
Bear McCreary composed the original score for The Rings of Power

Despite not being able to quote any of Shore's material from the films, McCreary wanted to stay true to Shore's approach by preserving the core sounds and styles of music for each culture that Shore had developed. In this way, he hoped to create a "continuity of concept" between Shore's music and his own, with his new themes being added to the "pantheon of memorable melodies" that Shore had written. When starting work on the series, McCreary met Shore and they discussed their approaches to writing music. McCreary felt there was an expectation, based on Shore's scores, that the music in the series be a "character in and of itself" and he wanted to match that by writing music that was less in the background than other modern scores are.

McCreary preferred to see completed footage from a project before composing music for it, but for The Rings of Power he had to begin work based only on the scripts for the first season, conversations with the showrunners, and seeing a rough version of the first two episodes. He felt this worked for the series because, as a Tolkien fan, he could compose themes based on his personal expectations. This meant he was also able to compose themes that would work across the whole series, rather than just the first season, because he already knew the major character arcs. McCreary typically composes three or four themes or leitmotifs for a project, but needed more than fifteen for the first season. He began working on the music in July 2021, starting with "an absolutely brutal six weeks" just composing the themes. He compared this to writing a symphony. McCreary next applied his themes to several key scenes from the first two episodes. He presented these to the showrunners and other executive producers before they heard the individual themes, because he wanted their first experience of the music to be in context.

Because of the delay in his hiring, McCreary had less time than he would have liked to compose the season's score. After his themes had been approved, he dedicated most of his time for the next eight months to composing the full nine-hour score for the first season. He only took five days off in that time, and eschewed the common industry practice of using other composers to write additional music. This was to ensure a consistent musical approach for the whole series. Also uncommonly, McCreary did not have spotting sessions with the showrunners after the first two episodes because they all felt that they were already on the same page. He would instead compose and mock-up the full score for each episode and send it to the showrunners, who generally had only a few specific notes for each one. McCreary said it was surreal to have that much freedom and trust on such a big series, which he called "the most ambitious thing that I've ever been attached to. It's a once-in-a-lifetime opportunity, to be able to pour myself into something so profoundly, and be given the space and the creative freedom to do the score I want to hear."

While he was focused on composing the score, McCreary's team at his Sparks & Shadows label were tasked with the orchestration, recording, and mixing. Supervising this work remotely while he was still composing all of the music himself took a large toll on McCreary's physical and mental wellbeing, but he chose to continue composing the entire score himself because he wanted to realize the "full extent of [his] vision" and because writing music for The Lord of the Rings was a lifelong dream of his. He finished composing in April 2022, and then spent around six months producing the music, creating albums, promoting the season, and writing blog entries that explain the score. McCreary finished this work in October, when he was given scripts for the second season so he could create music that was needed during filming. He initially expressed hope that he could pace out his work better on the second season, but the 2023 Writers Guild of America strike—which prevented the showrunners from working on the series—led to a change in schedule, with McCreary needing to compose much of the season's score before recording and mixing began near the end of post-production. He composed eight hours of music from September 2023 to April 2024, even less time than he had on the first season. McCreary was proud to again compose all of the music himself while improving his approach from the first season, this time looking after his health, staying connected to his family, and working on other projects at the same time.

=== Orchestration and languages ===
The score is orchestrated by McCreary's long-time collaborators Edward Trybek, Henri Wilkinson, and Jonathan Beard, who are collectively known as the Tutti Music Partners. They first had months of discussions with McCreary to understand his approach, and then followed detailed notes he made while composing. The trio said orchestrating each episode was comparable to working on a feature film.

In addition to orchestra and specialist instruments, McCreary composed for choir and solo singers. The lyrics for these use words from Tolkien's constructed languages: the Elvish languages Quenya and Sindarin, the Dwarvish language Khuzdul, the dark language Black Speech, and the Númenórean language Adûnaic. McCreary said there was potential to invent new words in some of these languages based on the rules that Tolkien established, but he preferred to stick to words that Tolkien created himself. He started by referring to a dictionary of words and phrases for each language while he was composing, and then worked with Sparks & Shadows's Brian Claeys to make sure the text fit the music. Payne reviewed all of the text in the first season's score to ensure each language was being used correctly. McCreary was grateful for this considering Payne's busy schedule as showrunner. Dialect coach Leith McPhearson recorded herself pronouncing every line of text phonetically, syllable by syllable, so the choirs and soloists could learn the correct pronunciation of each word ahead of recording.

The second season features lyrics written in the same fictional languages as the first season and also uses Rhûnic, which was developed for the series by scholars using unpublished notes from Tolkien. Carl F. Hostetter, a Tolkien scholar and the head of the Elvish Linguistic Fellowship, led the team responsible for translating English lyrics into Tolkien's languages. For the season, Payne wrote various poems in English which were translated into the appropriate fictional language. Claeys and Bailey Gordon ensured that the translated lyrics fit the music, and McPherson again recorded herself pronouncing each word for the singers to follow.

=== Recording and mixing ===
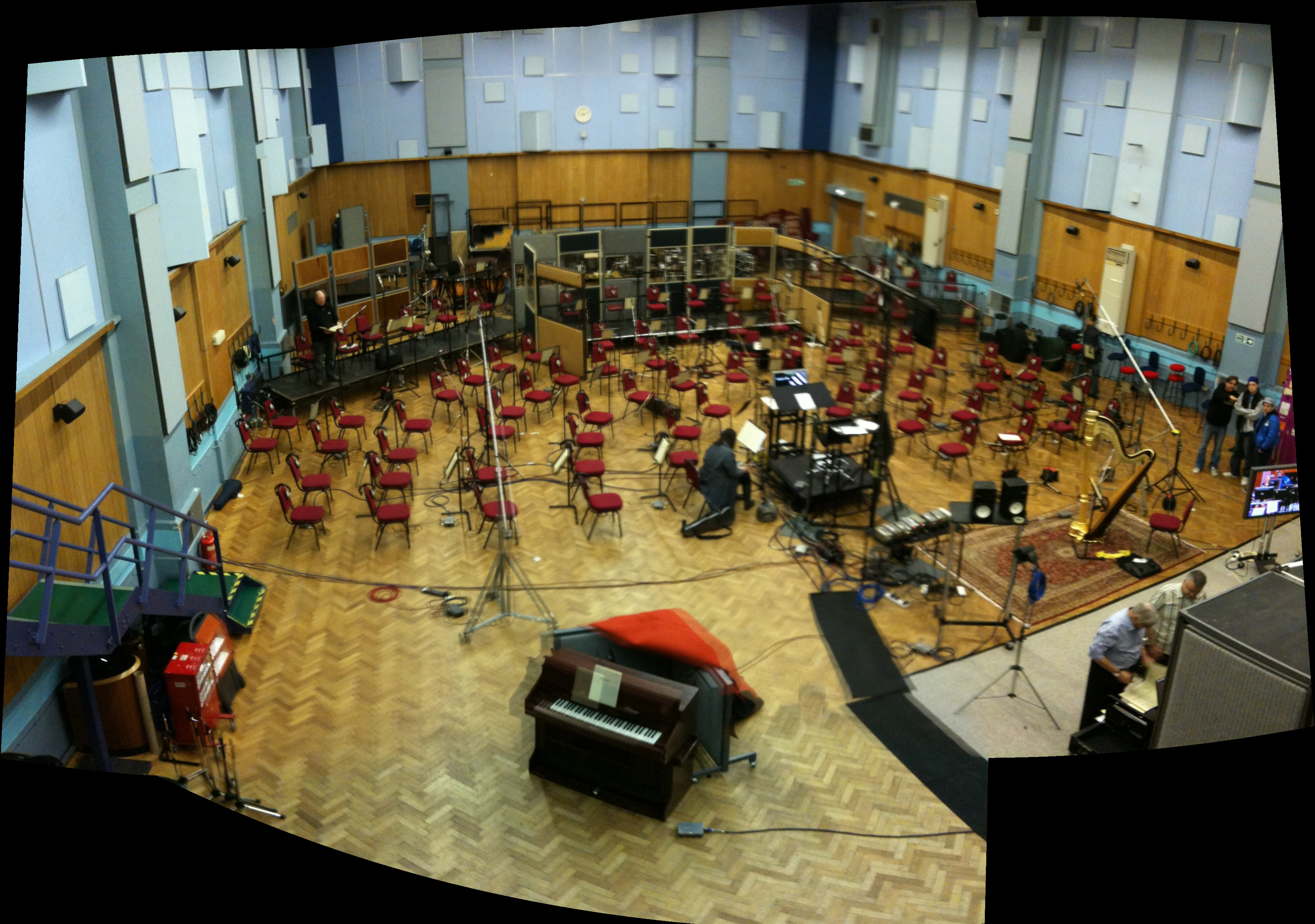
Recording for The Rings of Power took place around the world, including at Abbey Road Studios in London

Because of the series' large budget, McCreary had the resources to record the score how he wanted without having to use common television cost-saving techniques such as alternating between big and small orchestras. Each episode of the first season used a 90-piece orchestra at either Abbey Road Studios or AIR Studios in London over four days, a 40-person choir and children's choir at Synchron Stage in Vienna over three or four days, and soloists on various specialty instruments in Los Angeles, New York City, Norway, and Sweden over seven days. Recording began in November 2021. McCreary supervised remotely while Gavin Greenaway, Cliff Masterson, and Anthony Weeden conducted the orchestra, and Gottfried Rabl and Bernhard Melbye Voss conducted the choirs. McCreary conducted the orchestra for the final episode at AIR Studios in April 2022, after he finished composing.

Because of limits on the number of performers allowed together during the COVID-19 pandemic, the orchestra was split into strings, woodwind and brass, and percussion for separate recording sessions. The different recordings were mixed together by Jason LaRocca to sound like they were all recorded together. By the end of 2021, the music was being added to the final sound mix for each episode. The mixing schedule was comparable to a feature film and gave time for McCreary to work with each episode's editors, sound designer Robby Stambler, and sound mixers Lindsey Alvarez and Beau Borders until they were all happy, before the showrunners' involvement in the mix. McCreary said this was a first for his career.

Soloists that played specialty instruments for the first season include Paul Jacob Cartwright on fiddle, McCreary's longtime collaborator Eric Rigler on bagpipes and Irish whistles, Bruce Carver on bodhrán drums, Olav Luksengård Mjelva on the hardanger fiddle, Erik Rydvall on nyckelharpa, McCreary's close friend Malachai Bandy on the yaylı tambur and viola da gamba, and Zac Zinger on the shakuhachi flute. William Roper created the Orcs' music with horns of war, ceremonial shells, antlers, femur flutes, and Aztec death whistles. Violinist Sandy Cameron performed solos for the track "Scherzo for Violin and Swords" and the song "Where the Shadows Lie" while Eric Byers provided cello solos. Vocal soloists included Sladja Raicevic, child soprano Laura Maier, and McCreary's wife Raya Yarbrough.

Recording for the second season began around March 2024, while McCreary was composing the seventh episode, and took two months. Orchestral recording again took place at Abbey Road Studios and AIR Studios with Masterson and Weeden returning as conductors. McCreary conducted some of the sessions for the fifth and sixth episodes in April 2024, after he finished composing, and supervised the rest of recording remotely. The Synchron Stage Choir was again recorded at Synchron Stage in Vienna, conducted by Josy Svajda and Elizabeth Houser, with several other choirs added for the season: the Trinity Boys Choir was conducted by David Swinson at Trinity School in London; the Mystery of the Bulgarian Voices, a Bulgarian women's choir, was conducted by Dora Hristova at Sofia Session Studio in Sofia; and Mieskuoro Huutajat, a screaming men's choir, was conducted by Petri Sirviö at Wolfbeat Studios in Kempele, Finland. Simon Rhodes, an experienced score mixer for feature films, created orchestral pre-mixes for the season which Sparks & Shadows's Ryan Sanchez used in the final mix. Soloists that played specialty instruments for the second season include Cartwright on fiddle, Mjelva on hardanger fiddle, Rydvall on nyckelharpa, Bandy on viola da gamba and yaylı tambur, Byers on cello, Rigler on bagpipes and whistles, Carver on bodhrán and other percussion, Peyo Peev on the Bulgarian gadulka, Andrew Synowiec on guitars, and M.B. Gordy on percussion. Vocal soloists included Yarbrough, Juno Goode, and Clydene Jackson.

== Elements ==
=== Leitmotifs ===
Writing all of the themes or leitmotifs for the series and ensuring they were distinct and memorable required "every skill [McCreary] had ever learned" in his career. He used a unique set of specialty instruments for each theme on top of the orchestra and choir, and he chose a different starting interval so the themes would all be identifiable by their first two notes. McCreary wrote an "anthem" for each culture that the character themes could either align with or not, depending on the characterization, to "clearly express each theme's narrative intention". He composed multiple sections for each theme including introductions and developments.

==== Themes for Elves ====
- "Valinor":
  McCreary's theme for Valinor, the Elves' "homeland" across the sea, represents Elven culture in the series. He wanted it to be the music that Elves sing as they sail into Valinor, but the scene where that happens in the first episode had already been filmed by the time he was hired. The actors were singing a song by Plan 9 that McCreary felt did not work as a theme for Valinor, and therefore the Valinor theme that he wrote for the series needed to match the mouth movements in the scene. McCreary worked with the editing team for a month to perfect this. He retained Shore's approach to the Elves of focusing on "ethereal light vocals", and tried to create a sense of longing with techniques such as a chord that is "a tritone away from the tonic [meaning it] is as far away as the chord can possibly be... it feels like it's out of reach".
- "Galadriel":
  McCreary said the series was primarily told from Galadriel's perspective and he wanted to give her a memorable, powerful melody that could be used often. Like many of his heroic themes, Galadriel's begins with an upward motion (in this case a minor seventh interval). It then descends and rises several times to create the feeling that she is searching, representing her hunt for Sauron. Her theme has an "aggressive propulsion" related to the hunt that makes it an outlier among the music for the Elves, and McCreary designed her theme to combine easily with Sauron's because she is often thinking about him and her desire for justice.
- "Elrond Half-elven":
  The theme that McCreary had the most difficulty writing for the first season was Elrond's. His initial theme was inspired by the authoritative character from the books and films, but the executive producers did not notice there was an Elrond theme at first and felt he "wasn't sure what to say" with it. After discussing the character with them, McCreary saw an optimistic outsider struggling with the legacy of his family and wrote a woodwind and string melody that captured his "innocence, naïveté, and optimism". The theme moves between a major key and a minor key as if it "doesn't quite know whether it's happy or sad".

For the introductions of the Elven capital Lindon and High King Gil-galad, McCreary chose to use Elrond's theme. He did not do this to suggest that Elrond represented Elves in general, but because he wanted the audience to focus on Elrond's character in those scenes. He had a specific theme for Gil-galad planned but did not use it during the first season.

==== Themes for Dwarves ====
- "Khazad-dûm":
  McCreary retained Shore's approach of deep male vocals singing in the Dwarvish language Khuzdul, but was able to differentiate his theme from Shore's work because the series explores the Dwarves at their peak compared to the "sad, noble, displaced people in diaspora" of the films. McCreary wrote a patriotic anthem with a churning string pattern and anvils being hit with metal hammers. The introduction of Khazad-dûm was one of the first scenes McCreary scored, and the executive producers had no notes on it which led McCreary to say "the Dwarven music is very much in my DNA". This theme is also associated with King Durin III.
- "Durin IV":
  Prince Durin IV's theme shares traits with "Khazad-dûm", but McCreary said it had more "warmth, intimacy, [and] even a little comedy", with "a layer of jovial, almost jaunty personality". He felt there was a nobility to the music that avoided becoming comedic relief, especially when using a French horn for the tree that Elrond gave to Durin. This contrasts with the introduction of Durin's wife Disa, which uses a cello and fiddle.

==== Themes for Low Men ====
- "Halbrand":
  This theme represents the Low Men of the Southlands and their supposed king, Halbrand. Because Halbrand is Sauron in disguise, McCreary wrote this theme so playing it backwards or inverting the musical notes would turn it into Sauron's theme. To make this connection less obvious before the reveal, he adjusted Halbrand's theme to be in a major key; used different instruments from Sauron's theme; and added a second section with larger intervals between notes, similar to the big intervals in McCreary's heroic themes. McCreary said the Low Men of Middle-earth were represented in the films by the people of Rohan, for whom Shore primarily used the hardanger fiddle from Norway, so McCreary used the same instrument for the Low Men of the Southlands. He used it in a lower register and combined it with another Nordic stringed instrument, the nyckelharpa.
- "Bronwyn and Arondir":
  McCreary was unhappy with his initial version of the love theme for the human Bronwyn and Elf Arondir and re-wrote it after finishing the other themes. He wanted it to represent "yearning and attraction, but also sadness". Inspired by Nino Rota's score for Romeo and Juliet (1968) and the music of Dmitri Shostakovich, Samuel Barber, and John Williams, McCreary gave the theme repeated upward leaps to create a sense of longing.

==== Themes for High Men ====
- "Númenor":
  Because the island kingdom of Númenor does not exist during the time of the films, McCreary wanted to represent it with music that is not found in Shore's scores. He compared the culture to past civilizations in the real world that no longer exist, such as Ancient Egypt and Babylon, and decided to use Middle Eastern frame drums, Indian dhol drums, Armenian duduk woodwinds, and a Turkish yaylı tambur string instrument. He also focused on the brass section in the traditional European orchestra as an allusion to Arthurian legends. This theme also represents the character Pharazôn, and begins to be used in darker ways in the first season's second half.
- "Elendil and Isildur":
  This theme is for the Númenorean characters Elendil and Isildur, and is also used for the White Tree of Númenor. McCreary wrote the theme in anticipation of the Númenoreans being divided into the Faithful Númenoreans, who are still friends to Elves and are represented by the "Elendil and Isildur" theme, and the King's Men who continue to be represented by the main "Númenor" theme. Isildur is introduced with the theme played on a rustic fiddle while Elendil is represented by brass instruments. The second half of the theme is not used during the first season, because it was written to be used in later seasons when Elendil and Isildur are part of the last alliance between Elves and Men. McCreary wanted to make sure the "plaintive and wistful" theme would still work at that point in the story, when it would need to be "tragic, operatic, [and] soaring".

==== Themes for halflings ====
- "Harfoot Life":
  Representing the nomadic lifestyle of the secretive Harfoots, "Harfoot Life" is in the "off kilter" 11/8 time signature which McCreary compared to "a cart wheel that has a bump in it, and it's just rolling along". Because the Harfoots are the predecessors of the Hobbits from the films, McCreary wanted his music to be able to evolve into the Celtic-inspired music that Shore wrote for the Hobbits. The Harfoot theme therefore uses Celtic instruments: Scottish bagpipes, and Irish uilleann pipes, bodhrán drums, and penny whistles. McCreary added African balafon percussion that sounds like instruments the Harfoots could make out of logs picked up while traveling. He explained that these sounds would be abandoned in the future when the Harfoots settle down in the Shire, at which point Shore's more orchestral Hobbit music would become more appropriate.
- "Nori Brandyfoot":
  The theme for the hopeful and curious Harfoot Nori is more melodic than "Harfoot Life", puts more focus on the Celtic instruments, and also uses the smoother time signature of 6/8. This means instead of having repeated small intervals like "Harfoot Life", "Nori Brandyfoot" has bigger leaps that suggest she is not satisfied living a regular Harfoot life and is looking outward and upward. McCreary wrote Nori's theme before he settled on the Harfoot approach and had to add elements of "Harfoot Life" into his Nori theme, including an opening ostinato on wooden percussion, to ensure she still had the "Harfoot color".

==== Themes for Orcs ====
- "Nampat":
  This track combines McCreary's themes for the Orcs and their leader, Adar. To represent the Orcs, McCreary created a "screaming, weird, otherworldly texture" using drums and woodwind instruments made from bones such as antlers and femurs. He also used conch shells and Aztec death whistles. He described this as more of a "musical cloud" than a theme, differentiating it from the rest of the series' themes, including Sauron's. In contrast, Adar's theme has a melody. This is heard in "Nampat" on brass instruments but is often played in the series on a combination of Japanese shakuhachi and Chinese dizi flutes. McCreary included several references to Garry Schyman's score for the video game Middle-earth: Shadow of Mordor (2014) in his Orc theme, saying it was his favorite The Lord of the Rings music outside of the film and television adaptations.

==== Themes for other characters ====
- "Sauron":
  Sauron's theme combines an ostinato in 7/8 time with a melody in 4/4 time to indicate the character's twisted and uneven nature. It has a circular, repeating shape. The theme includes a choir chanting in Black Speech, using words from the inscription on the One Ring because Tolkien did not provide many other Black Speech words in his writings. McCreary said the chanting sounded louder than he originally intended, and "so evil", and stated that Tolkien's books "implied that when you speak in Black Speech, an evil cloud fills the room... and that happened!" McCreary created variations on Sauron's circular theme for when the character shapeshifts, including as Halbrand. He also used this theme to represent Sauron's predecessor, the Dark Lord Morgoth, who is only briefly shown in the series.
- "The Stranger":
  The theme for the mysterious stranger who crashes into Middle-earth does not share any music ideas with the series' cultural themes to reflect that his origin is unknown. The theme always starts with the sounds of an Indonesian gamelan percussion ensemble, and a major seventh interval that McCreary said was rare for modern popular music. He stated that the theme is "both major and minor, both heroic and twisted" to add to the mystery of the character. McCreary did not ask who the character was specifically when he began writing the theme, but did ask if he would be a hero or villain. Because he knew the character would be heroic at the end of the first season, McCreary made the theme more ominous at the beginning. This approach was inspired by the scores for E.T. the Extra-Terrestrial (1982) and The Iron Giant (1999).
- "The Mystics":
  The final character theme introduced in the first season is for these three mysterious women. McCreary said it was the simplest theme in the score, featuring whispered vocals and no melody. To represent the three characters he chose three repeating Quenya words and the time signature 3/4. Two production techniques were used to give the choir an "otherworldly quality": they were recorded in different layers that were mixed together in irregular ways, creating an uncomfortable feeling inspired by ASMR videos; and a "reverse reverb" effect was added before the start of each word, so the first syllable reverberates before it is whispered.

==== Other themes ====
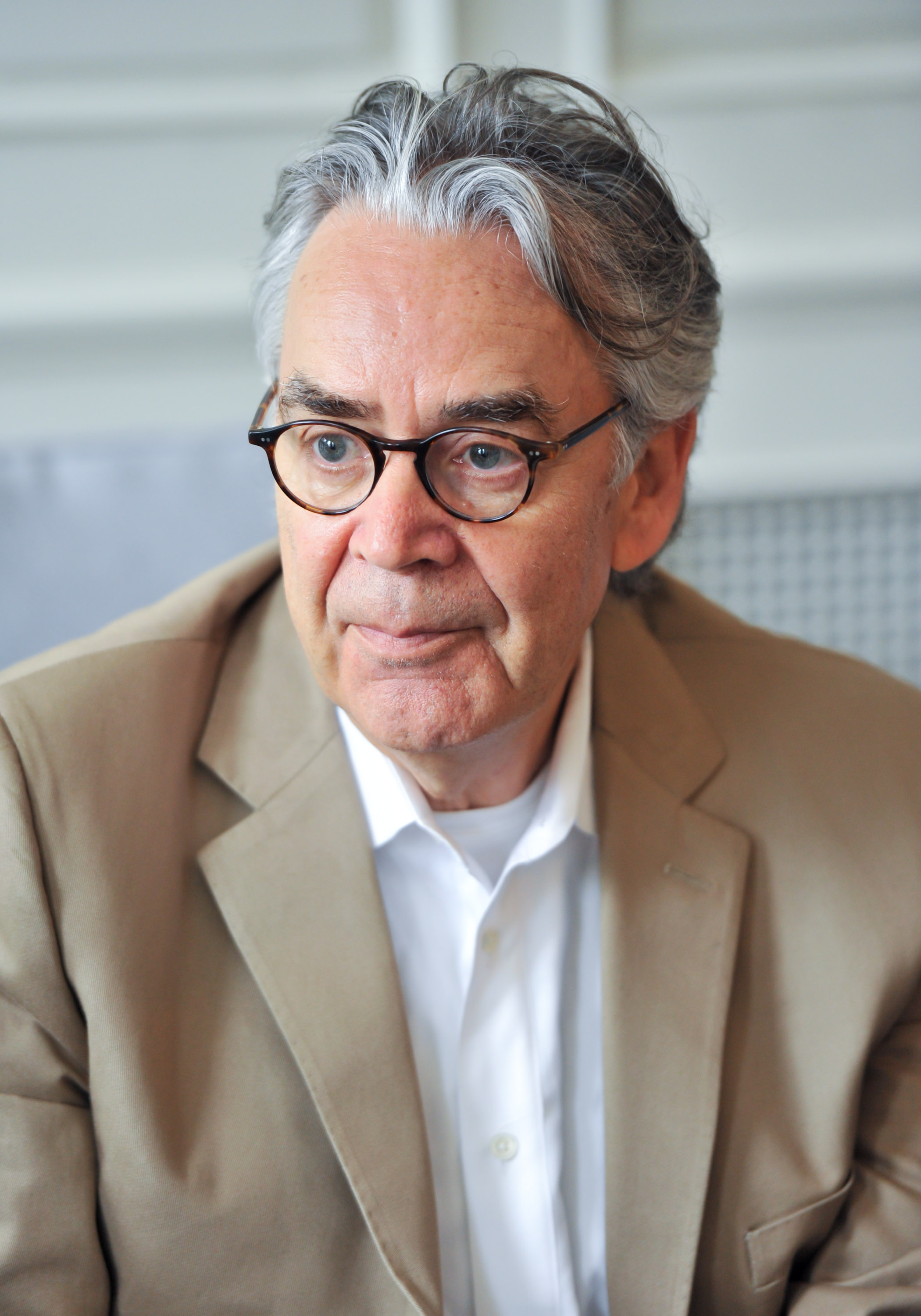
Film composer Howard Shore provided the main title theme for The Rings of Power

- "The Lord of the Rings: The Rings of Power Main Title":
  The series' main title theme, composed by Howard Shore, was created independently of McCreary's score. McCreary first heard it when he was around halfway through composing the music for the first season and he said it was a "wonderful fanfare for our show" that lived up to his expectations. He described it as "beautiful and noble" and said it made him nostalgic for Jackson's films, while also fitting "so beautifully" with his own score for the series.
- "Where the Shadows Lie":
  This song was composed by McCreary using the text of the Ring Verse poem from Tolkien's The Lord of the Rings, and he used it as a theme for the Rings of Power, the magic of mithril, Sauron's machinations, and the dark land of Mordor. McCreary said it combined a "haunting melody" with Tolkien's ominous text. It is first heard over the opening title card of the first episode, "A Shadow of the Past"; it is played in full without lyrics over that episode's end credits; and it is used multiple times in the score for each episode. It is first heard with lyrics during the end credits of the first-season finale, "Alloyed". The lyrics were withheld until then to not spoil the theme's meaning during the earlier episodes, though McCreary revealed that there was a theme for the Rings of Power in his score before the song was released.

Additionally, McCreary used the "overblown woodwind effect" of a Japanese shakuhachi flute as a recurring sound to signify the presence of wolves in the series.

=== Songs and diegetic music ===
Plan 9 and David Long wrote eight pieces of music for use on the first season's set, including diegetic music for the streets of Númenor and on-screen songs. McCreary was happy to see that the series was embracing songs, believing that they are a key part of Tolkien's writings and help show the different cultures of Middle-earth. For the second season, the writers began looking early on for more times where characters could sing, and McCreary was able to contribute to the music needed during filming because he was already involved in the production from the start.

The Lord of the Rings: The Rings of Power original songs
Title	Episode	Performer(s)	Ref.
"A Plea to the Rocks"	"The Great Wave"	Sophia Nomvete	
"This Wandering Day"	"Partings"	Megan Richards (episode) and Janet Roddick (end credits)	
"Where the Shadows Lie"	"Alloyed"	Fiona Apple	

=== Additional music ===
McCreary composed original music for the series' January 2022 title announcement video, using his "The Stranger" theme. Later that year, he performed live at San Diego Comic-Con, combing the tracks "Nolwa Mahtar", "Galadriel", "Sauron", and "The Stranger" into an overture for choir, orchestra, percussion, and solo violinist Sandy Cameron. For the series' London premiere in August, McCreary was again joined by Cameron for a performance that featured a large percussion ensemble and choir. To promote the second season at Comic-Con 2024, McCreary combined the tracks "Nampat" and "Sauron" for male choir and taiko drummers.

== Release ==
=== Singles ===
Two singles from the first season's score were released when McCreary was announced as composer for the series. For the second season, two songs were released as singles ahead of the soundtrack album, while one song was released as a single ahead of the third season's soundtrack album.

The Lord of the Rings: The Rings of Power singles
Title	Format	Length	US release date	Label	Ref.
"Galadriel"	Digital	3:44	July 21, 2022	Amazon Music	
"Sauron"	Digital	2:46	July 21, 2022	Amazon Music	
"The Last Ballad of Damrod" (featuring Jens Kidman)	Digital	3:18	August 8, 2024	Roadrunner Records	
"Old Tom Bombadil" (featuring Rufus Wainwright)	Digital	3:10	August 15, 2024	Amazon Music	
"Morning Shall Come" (featuring Aurora)	Digital	5:04	November 6, 2026	Fontana Records	

=== Albums ===
McCreary produced a first-season album featuring his main themes as well as highlights from each episode. He edited, re-wrote, and re-recorded most of the music to create "an emotional listening experience that captures the season's narrative arc in a symphonic format", and to remove some spoilers because the album was released before the season was. The version of "Where the Shadows Lie" featuring Fiona Apple was added to the album after all the episodes were released. McCreary also released individual albums after each episode debuted, containing "virtually every second of score" from each episode. Music for the second season was released in the same pattern, with an initial album featuring themes and selections from the full season's score followed by individual episode albums. Additional music that McCreary composed for promotional purposes is included in some of the episode albums as bonus tracks. For the third season, an initial album featuring themes and selections from the full season's score is set to be released, with an expanded digital collector's edition of the soundtrack to follow. Each of the series' albums were mastered by Patricia Sullivan at Bernie Grundman Mastering, a longtime collaborator of McCreary's.

The Lord of the Rings: The Rings of Power albums
Title	Format	Length	US release date	Label	Ref.
Season One	Digital	160:54	August 19, 2022	Amazon Music	
Season One	CD	160:54	October 14, 2022	Mondo	
Season One	Vinyl	160:54	January 13, 2023	Mondo	
Season One, Episode One: A Shadow of the Past	Digital	55:49	September 1, 2022	Amazon Music	
Season One, Episode Two: Adrift	Digital	49:17	September 1, 2022	Amazon Music	
Season One, Episode Three: Adar	Digital	51:29	September 8, 2022	Amazon Music	
Season One, Episode Four: The Great Wave	Digital	54:53	September 15, 2022	Amazon Music	
Season One, Episode Five: Partings	Digital	55:08	September 22, 2022	Amazon Music	
Season One, Episode Six: Udûn	Digital	48:56	September 29, 2022	Amazon Music	
Season One, Episode Seven: The Eye	Digital	54:57	October 6, 2022	Amazon Music	
Season One, Episode Eight: Alloyed	Digital	59:46	October 14, 2022	Amazon Music	
Season Two	Digital	100:50	August 23, 2024	Amazon Music	
Season Two	CD	100:50	November 29, 2024	Mutant	
Season Two	Vinyl	82:06	November 29, 2024	Mutant	
Season Two, Episode One: Elven Kings Under the Sky	Digital	45:32	August 29, 2024	Amazon Music	
Season Two, Episode Two: Where the Stars are Strange	Digital	40:08	August 29, 2024	Amazon Music	
Season Two, Episode Three: The Eagle and the Sceptre	Digital	41:24	August 29, 2024	Amazon Music	
Season Two, Episode Four: Eldest	Digital	40:14	September 5, 2024	Amazon Music	
Season Two, Episode Five: Halls of Stone	Digital	40:11	September 12, 2024	Amazon Music	
Season Two, Episode Six: Where Is He?	Digital	39:59	September 19, 2024	Amazon Music	
Season Two, Episode Seven: Doomed to Die	Digital	45:07	September 26, 2024	Amazon Music	
Season Two, Episode Eight: Shadow and Flame	Digital	56:00	October 3, 2024	Amazon Music	
Season Three	Digital	TBA	November 13, 2026	Amazon Music	
Season Three	CD	TBA	TBA	Mutant	
Season Three	Vinyl	TBA	TBA	Mutant	

=== Box sets ===
A limited edition box set for the first season was released on April 26, 2024, from Mondo, Amazon Music, and Sparks & Shadows. The collection includes Mondo's two CD first-season album release and eight CDs featuring the music from each episode. It also comes with a 136-page journal written by McCreary which details his episode-by-episode account and general thoughts on the creation of the season's score. A similar limited edition box set for the second season—collecting the two CD season album, eight episode CDs, and a 130-page journal by McCreary—was announced in October 2025, from Mutant and Sparks & Shadows.

== Reception ==
=== Critical response ===
Jonathan Broxton of Movie Music UK said the time and effort it took to write a review of the first season's score was worth it, praising it as the best of McCreary's career and calling it an astonishing achievement that lived up to the high bar set by Shore with the films. Broxton discussed the various themes and techniques used by McCreary and concluded that "the conceptual design, intellectual creativity, and musical world-building in this score is something that you just don't see in modern film scoring... the fact that so many of the themes are clearly identifiable and memorable, with actual hummable melodies, is something that should be celebrated everywhere". Broxton felt it was the best score for any film or series of 2022, and in his annual Movie Music UK Awards he named it the score of the year as well as the best original score for television.

Reviewing the score for Movie Wave, James Southall said McCreary's hiring was a masterstroke and the composer had managed to write music that fit alongside Shore's without trying to imitate the latter. None of McCreary's themes gave Southall the "instant gratification" of some key Shore themes from the films, but he still found some to be memorable—a rarity for modern television, in his opinion—and particularly praised "Galadriel". Southall felt the score was a career-defining moment for McCreary. Sci-Fi Bulletin's David A. McIntee said McCreary's score was a true pastiche of Shore's style and the best of television composing, rating the first season album a superlative 11 out of 10. Sarah Shachat of IndieWire called the score a "force of nature" and highlighted McCreary's ability to convey story and character information while also "reverse engineering" sounds that would feasibly evolve into Shore's material. Kyle Kruske echoed those thoughts in an "ode to Bear McCreary's excellent score" that he wrote for MovieWeb, in which he said the score was a "worthy successor" to Shore's "musical crown".

Patrick Lyon at Collider said the score had taken him "right back to Middle-earth" and discussed how McCreary had honored Shore's approach to leitmotifs for the films. Lyon highlighted the track "Khazad-dûm" and how it was consistent with Shore's own material for the Dwarves while also representing a different era for those characters. Alice Rose Dodds of Game Rant also discussed how McCreary had honored Shore's work while creating a score that matched the needs of The Rings of Power's setting and characters. She had similar thoughts to Lyon on "Khazad-dûm" and also highlighted the approach taken for "Galadriel" compared to Shore's music for that character. Dodds concluded that "McCreary takes everything that Shore has done, and transforms it into something that works with the new context of the show... it brings hope to those who listen, that Rings of Power will burn with Tolkien's heart at its center". Writing for /Film, Jeremy Mathai said the score was a testament to the power of musical motifs which many modern films and series, such as the Marvel Cinematic Universe, did not take advantage of.

Writing for Screen Rant, Thomas Bacon described McCreary's score as "absolutely stunning" and said it evoked Shore's music while bringing a new feeling for the series. Bacon felt the score did not quite live up to the films, but said it was "remarkably impressive and serves as a testimony to [McCreary]'s real skill and talent". Zanobard Reviews also felt the score did not match Shore's and was disappointed in Shore's own contribution, feeling the main theme was not memorable and was only added so Shore would be associated with the series. However, they said McCreary's work was "pretty damned amazing" and graded the first season album 9 out of 10.

=== Commercial performance ===
Within two weeks of the first season album's release, Shore's main theme was streamed over 117,000 times on Spotify while the tracks "Galadriel" and "Khazad-dûm" were streamed over 100,000 times.

Chart positions for Season One
Chart (2022)	Peak position	Ref.
UK Soundtrack Albums Chart	15	
UK Album Downloads Chart	28	

Chart positions for Season Two
Chart (2024)	Peak position	Ref.
UK Soundtrack Albums Chart	17	
UK Album Downloads Chart	44	

=== Accolades ===
The first season's score was ranked seventh on IndieWire's list of the best television scores of 2022.

Accolades received by The Lord of the Rings: The Rings of Power for its music
Award	Date of ceremony	Category	Recipient(s)	Result	Ref.
ASCAP Composers' Choice Awards	May 16, 2023	Television score of the year	Bear McCreary (for Season One)	Nominated	
Hollywood Music in Media Awards	November 16, 2022	Original Score — TV Show/Limited Series	Bear McCreary (for Season One)	Nominated	
Hollywood Music in Media Awards	November 18, 2026	Original Song — TV Show/Limited Series	Bear McCreary, Aurora, and J. D. Payne (for "Morning Shall Come")	Pending	
Hollywood Music in Media Awards	November 18, 2026	Original Score — TV Show/Limited Series	Bear McCreary (for Season Three)	Pending	
International Film Music Critics Association Awards	February 23, 2023	Score of the Year	Bear McCreary and Howard Shore (for Season One)	Won	
International Film Music Critics Association Awards	February 23, 2023	Composer of the Year	Bear McCreary	Won	
International Film Music Critics Association Awards	February 23, 2023	Composition of the Year	Bear McCreary (for "Galadriel")	Nominated	
International Film Music Critics Association Awards	February 23, 2023	Composition of the Year	Bear McCreary (for "Númenor")	Nominated	
International Film Music Critics Association Awards	February 23, 2023	Composition of the Year	Bear McCreary (for "Sailing Into the Dawn")	Nominated	
International Film Music Critics Association Awards	February 23, 2023	Best Original Score for Television	Bear McCreary and Howard Shore (for Season One)	Won	
International Film Music Critics Association Awards	February 27, 2025	Score of the Year	Bear McCreary (for Season Two)	Won	
International Film Music Critics Association Awards	February 27, 2025	Composer of the Year	Bear McCreary	Won	
International Film Music Critics Association Awards	February 27, 2025	Composition of the Year	Bear McCreary (for "Battle for Eregion")	Nominated	
International Film Music Critics Association Awards	February 27, 2025	Composition of the Year	Bear McCreary (for "The Sun Yet Shines")	Nominated	
International Film Music Critics Association Awards	February 27, 2025	Best Original Score for Television	Bear McCreary (for Season Two)	Won	
Primetime Creative Arts Emmy Awards	January 7, 2024	Original Main Title Theme Music	Howard Shore (for "The Lord of the Rings: The Rings of Power Main Title")	Nominated	
Society of Composers & Lyricists Awards	February 15, 2023	Outstanding Original Score for a Television Production	Bear McCreary (for Season One)	Nominated	
Society of Composers & Lyricists Awards	February 12, 2025	Outstanding Original Score for a Television Production	Bear McCreary (for Season Two)	Nominated	
Society of Composers & Lyricists Awards	February 12, 2025	Outstanding Original Song for a Dramatic or Documentary Visual Media Production	Bear McCreary (for "Old Tom Bombadil")	Nominated	
World Soundtrack Awards	October 21, 2023	Television Composer of the Year	Bear McCreary	Nominated	
World Soundtrack Awards	October 15, 2025	Television Composer of the Year	Bear McCreary	Nominated	

== See also ==
- Music of The Lord of the Rings film series
- Music of The Hobbit film series
