= International Film Music Critics Association =

Professional association

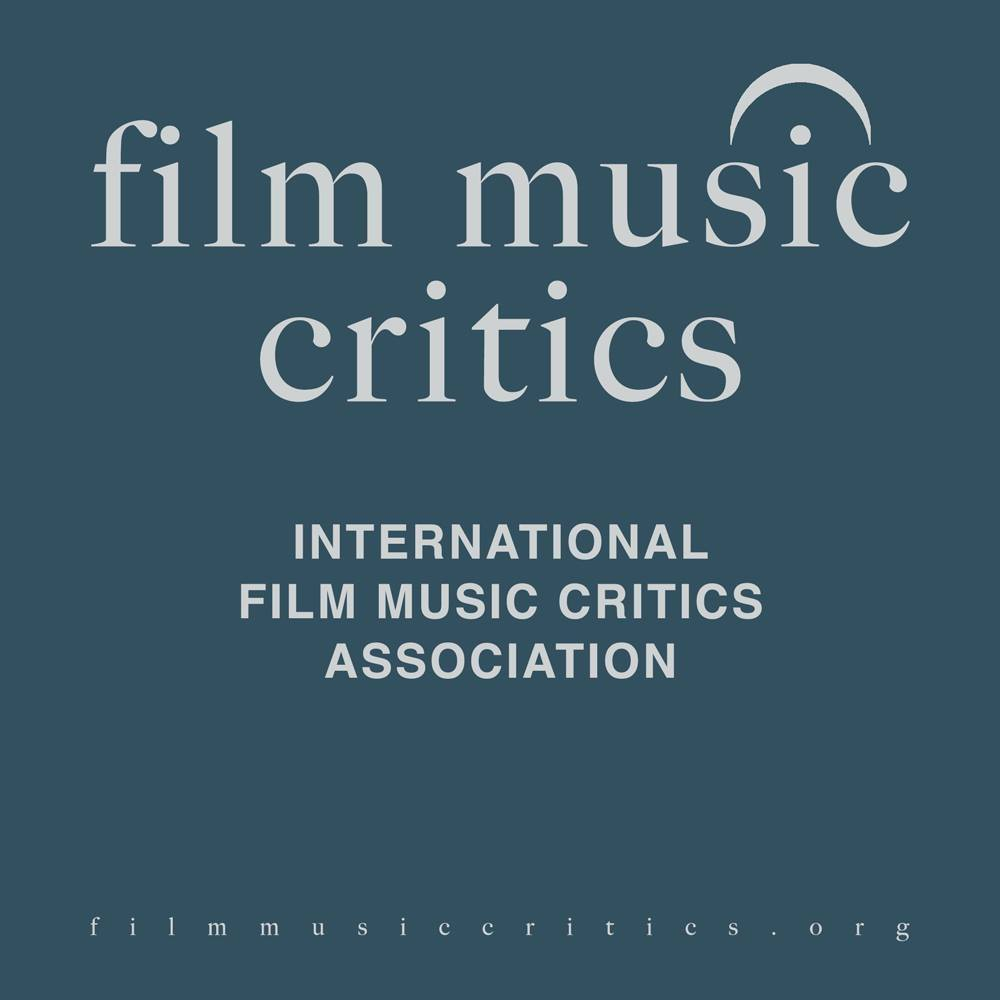

The International Film Music Critics Association (IFMCA) is a professional association for online, print and radio journalists who specialize in writing about original film and television music.

== History and purpose ==
The IFMCA was founded in the late 1990s as the Film Music Critics Jury by film music journalist Mikael Carlsson (now the owner of film music record label MovieScore Media), and after period of inactivity was re-launched in 2003 under its new title.

Its membership includes 65 journalists from 16 different countries who write for such high-profile film and soundtrack-related publications and websites as Film Score Monthly, Filmtracks, SoundtrackNet, Music from the Movies, MundoBSO and UnderScores, as well as more mainstream publications such as Ain't It Cool News, Variety, The Hollywood Reporter and the Irish Times. Members of the IFMCA have also been involved in writing liner notes for major film music record labels such as Film Score Monthly, Varèse Sarabande, Intrada Records, La-La Land Records and Music Box Records.

The group maintains a website documenting its activities; operates a central online review interface which provides links to articles, reviews and interviews written by its members; organizes an annual awards event, the IFMCA Awards, celebrating music for films written during the preceding year; and is involved in organizing major international film music festivals, such as those in Tenerife, Úbeda in Spain, Kraków in Poland, and the World Soundtrack Awards in Ghent, Belgium.

== IFMCA Awards ==
The organization is responsible for the annual International Film Music Critics Association Awards, the only awards given to composers by active film music journalists, and which are seen by many as a valuable precursor to the Academy Awards in the absence of a guild for composers. They have been called the "Oscars of film music", have been featured in major daily newspapers in Spain and Portugal, are recognized by major performing rights organizations such as ASCAP in the United States and SGAE in Europe, and most recently have been seen by the video games industry as an important step forward in legitimizing game music as a mainstream creative art form.

Composers as varied as John Debney, Alexandre Desplat, Randy Edelman, George Fenton, Michael Giacchino, James Newton Howard Mark Isham, Andrew Lockington, Abel Korzeniowski, Brian Tyler, Fernando Velázquez and Debbie Wiseman highlight their IFMCA Award wins and nominations in their official biographies.

Major Award Winners
Year	Score of the Year Award	Composer of the Year Award
1998	Mulan (Jerry Goldsmith)	Jerry Goldsmith
1999	The Mummy (Jerry Goldsmith)	Jerry Goldsmith
2000	Gladiator (Hans Zimmer)	James Newton Howard
2004	The Incredibles (Michael Giacchino)	Michael Giacchino
2005	Memoirs of a Geisha (John Williams)	John Williams
2006	Lady in the Water (James Newton Howard)	Alexandre Desplat
2007	Atonement (Dario Marianelli)	Alexandre Desplat
2008	The Curious Case of Benjamin Button (Alexandre Desplat)	Danny Elfman
2009	Up (Michael Giacchino)	Michael Giacchino
2010	How to Train Your Dragon (John Powell)	Alexandre Desplat
2011	War Horse (John Williams)	John Williams
2012	Life of Pi (Mychael Danna)	Danny Elfman
2013	Romeo and Juliet (Abel Korzeniowski)	Abel Korzeniowski
2014	Interstellar (Hans Zimmer)	Hans Zimmer
2015	Star Wars: The Force Awakens (John Williams)	Michael Giacchino
2016	Arrival (Jóhann Jóhannsson)	Michael Giacchino
2017	Phantom Thread (Jonny Greenwood)	Alexandre Desplat
2018	Solo: A Star Wars Story (John Powell)	James Newton Howard
2019	Star Wars: The Rise of Skywalker (John Williams)	Bear McCreary
2020	The Personal History of David Copperfield (Christopher Willis)	Daniel Pemberton
2021	Coppelia (Maurizio Malagnini)	James Newton Howard
2022	The Lord of the Rings: The Rings of Power (Bear McCreary)	Bear McCreary
2023	Indiana Jones and the Dial of Destiny (John Williams)	Christopher Young
2024	The Lord of the Rings: The Rings of Power (Bear McCreary)	Bear McCreary
2025	Avatar: Fire and Ash (Simon Franglen)	Alexandre Desplat
