= Musicology Live 2004ever =

2004 concert tour by Prince

- Continental tour by Prince
- Poster to the concert in Alabama, USA
- Location: North America
- Associated album: Musicology
- Start date: March 27, 2004
- End date: September 11, 2004
- No. of shows: 88
- Attendance: 1.240 million
- Box office: US$87.4 million

Prince concert chronology
- World Tour 2003 (2003); Musicology Live 2004ever (2004); Per4ming Live 3121 (2006–07)

Musicology Live 2004ever was a concert tour by American recording artist Prince to promote his Musicology album. The tour began on March 27, 2004 in Reno, Nevada and concluded on September 11 in San Jose, California. It was a commercial success earning $87.4 million from 77 shows in 52 cities across the United States and selling more than 1.4 million tickets. Prince said one of the goals of the tour was "to bring back music and live musicianship."

== Background and development ==
In April 2004, Prince released his thirtieth studio album Musicology from Columbia Records after leaving former record labels Warner Bros. and Arista. The album followed the 2003 releases Xpectation and N.E.W.S. When speaking about the album, Prince stated:

"I am really an artist and a musician at heart, that's what I do. Musicology has no boundaries or formats. It is long overdue to return to the art and craft of music, that's what this album is about. School's in session."

The singer gave a small performance at the El Rey Theater in Los Angeles in February to preview some of the new songs from the album where he also announced plans for an upcoming tour. Tour dates were announced later that month in North America. He opened the 2004 Grammy Awards with Beyoncé and was also inducted into the Rock and Roll Hall of Fame the same year. More tour dates were announced shortly afterward.

The Musicology Tour also increased sales of the Musicology album because concertgoers received a copy of Musicology, with the album cost included in the ticket price for the tour. This prompted Billboard magazine and Nielsen SoundScan to change its chart data methodology: For future album releases, Billboard says that customers "must be given an option to either add the CD to the ticket purchase or forgo the CD for a reduced ticket-only price."

== Set list ==
This set list is representative of the first show in Los Angeles on March 29, 2004. It does not represent all concerts during the tour.

1. "Musicology"
2. "Let's Go Crazy"
3. "I Would Die 4 U"
4. "When Doves Cry"
5. "Baby I'm a Star"
6. "Shhh"
7. "D.M.S.R."
8. "I Feel for You"
9. "Controversy"
10. "God" (interlude)
11. "The Beautiful Ones"
12. "Nothing Compares 2 U"
13. "Insatiable"
14. "Sign 'O' the Times"
15. "The Question of U"
16. "Let's Work"
17. "U Got the Look"
18. "Life O' the Party"
19. "Soul Man"
20. "Kiss"
21. "Take Me with U"

Encore

22. Acoustic Medley: "4ever in My Life" / "12:01" / "On the Couch" / "Little Red Corvette" / "Sometimes It Snows in April" / "7"
23. "Purple Rain"

== Tour dates ==
List of 2004 concerts, showing date, city, country, venue, tickets sold, number of available tickets and amount of gross revenue
Date	City	Country	Venue	Attendance	Revenue
March 27	Reno	United States	Lawlor Events Center	11,777 / 11,777	$748,253
March 29	Los Angeles	United States	Staples Center	17,367 / 17,367	$1,249,585
March 30	Bakersfield	United States	Centennial Garden	7,987 / 7,987	$599,025
March 31	Glendale	United States	Glendale Arena	16,094 / 16,094	$1,035,859
April 2	Dallas	United States	American Airlines Center	18,483 / 18,483	$1,161,356
April 6	Oklahoma City	United States	Ford Center	13,651 / 13,651	$845,412
April 7	Omaha	United States	Qwest Center	12,398 / 12,398	$632,148
April 8	Ames	United States	Hilton Coliseum	11,009 / 11,009	$510,195
April 10	Champaign	United States	UI Assembly Hall	11,867 / 11,867	$560,008
April 12	Indianapolis	United States	Conseco Fieldhouse	10,859 / 10,859	$678,557
April 13	Cincinnati	United States	U.S. Bank Arena	12,805 / 12,805	$800,568
April 14	Pittsburgh	United States	Mellon Arena	14,092 / 14,092	$869,272
April 16	Columbus	United States	Schottenstein Center	16,381 / 16,381	$928,386
April 17	Cleveland	United States	Gund Arena	18,558 / 18,558	$1,101,243
April 18	University Park	United States	Bryce Jordan Center	10,913 / 10,913	$548,586
April 21	Columbia	United States	Colonial Center	16,165 / 16,165	$873,620
April 22	Knoxville	United States	Thompson–Boling Arena	11,614 / 11,614	$651,685
April 23	Raleigh	United States	RBC Center	18,494 / 18,494	$1,159,331
April 25	Sunrise	United States	Office Depot Center	18,231 / 18,231	$1,051,164
April 26	Tampa	United States	St. Pete Times Forum	17,079 / 17,079	$1,038,895
April 27	Jacksonville	United States	Jacksonville Veterans Memorial Arena	14,791 / 14,791	$880,132
April 29	Birmingham	United States	Birmingham–Jefferson Convention Complex	16,889 / 16,889	$826,669
April 30	Atlanta	United States	Philips Arena	17,977 / 17,977	$1,168,393
May 1	Biloxi	United States	Mississippi Coast Coliseum	10,365 / 10,365	$606,474
May 4	Kansas City	United States	Kemper Arena	14,941 / 14,941	$752,126
May 5	St. Louis	United States	Savvis Center	17,393 / 17,393	$953,651
May 6	Nashville	United States	Gaylord Entertainment Center	16,680 / 16,680	$983,425
May 24	Anaheim	United States	Arrowhead Pond of Anaheim	15,467 / 15,467	$968,729
May 26	Los Angeles	United States	Staples Center	34,651 / 34,651	$2,527,148
May 28	Los Angeles	United States	Staples Center	34,651 / 34,651	$2,527,148
May 29	Paradise	United States	Mandalay Bay Events Center	22,594 / 22,594	$2,432,651
May 30	Paradise	United States	Mandalay Bay Events Center	22,594 / 22,594	$2,432,651
June 1	San Jose	United States	HP Pavilion	35,269 / 35,269	$2,332,326
June 2	San Jose	United States	HP Pavilion	35,269 / 35,269	$2,332,326
June 3	Los Angeles	United States	Staples Center	34,642 / 34,642	$2,478,030
June 4	Los Angeles	United States	Staples Center	34,642 / 34,642	$2,478,030
June 9	San Antonio	United States	SBC Center	12,607 / 12,607	$774,980
June 11	Dallas	United States	American Airlines Center	18,093 / 18,093	$1,043,408
June 12	Bossier City	United States	CenturyTel Center	12,552 / 12,552	$670,239
June 14	Memphis	United States	The Pyramid	17,202 / 17,202	$942,981
June 16	Saint Paul	United States	Xcel Energy Center	60,044 / 60,044	$3,615,429
June 17	Saint Paul	United States	Xcel Energy Center	60,044 / 60,044	$3,615,429
June 18	Saint Paul	United States	Xcel Energy Center	60,044 / 60,044	$3,615,429
June 20	Auburn Hills	United States	The Palace of Auburn Hills	39,009 / 39,009	$2,274,438
June 21	Auburn Hills	United States	The Palace of Auburn Hills	39,009 / 39,009	$2,274,438
June 24	Milwaukee	United States	Marcus Amphitheater	21,475 / 21,475	$1,167,219
June 25	Rosemont	United States	Allstate Arena	17,642 / 17,642	$1,063,791
July 12	New York City	United States	Madison Square Garden	57,023 / 57,023	$3,973,848
July 13	New York City	United States	Madison Square Garden	57,023 / 57,023	$3,973,848
July 14	New York City	United States	Madison Square Garden	57,023 / 57,023	$3,973,848
July 16	East Rutherford	United States	Continental Airlines Arena	40,502 / 40,502	$2,567,168
July 17	Hartford	United States	Hartford Civic Center	12,698 / 12,698	$674,076
July 18	East Rutherford	United States	Continental Airlines Arena	(Note: The score data is representative of the two shows in East Rutherford, New Jersey at the Continental Airlines Arena on July 16 and July 18 respectively.)	
July 20	Uniondale	United States	Nassau Veterans Memorial Coliseum	16,661 / 16,661	$1,007,320
July 22	Rosemont	United States	Allstate Arena	50,089 / 50,089	$2,770,944
July 23	Rosemont	United States	Allstate Arena	50,089 / 50,089	$2,770,944
July 24	Rosemont	United States	Allstate Arena	50,089 / 50,089	$2,770,944
July 27	Toronto	Canada	Air Canada Centre	39,366 / 39,366	$2,899,618
July 28	Toronto	Canada	Air Canada Centre	39,366 / 39,366	$2,899,618
July 30	Detroit	United States	Joe Louis Arena	18,993 / 18,993	$1,214,610
July 31	Auburn Hills	United States	The Palace of Auburn Hills	19,505 / 19,505	$1,679,045
August 1	Grand Rapids	United States	Van Andel Arena	10,354 / 10,354	$632,130
August 3	Rosemont	United States	Allstate Arena	16,697 / 16,697	$1,081,453
August 6	Houston	United States	Toyota Center	31,504 / 31,504	$1,816,214
August 7	Houston	United States	Toyota Center	31,504 / 31,504	$1,816,214
August 9	Atlanta	United States	Philips Arena	33,214 / 33,214	$2,031,926
August 10	Atlanta	United States	Philips Arena	33,214 / 33,214	$2,031,926
August 12	Washington, D.C.	United States	MCI Center	54,927 / 54,927	$3,549,885
August 13	Washington, D.C.	United States	MCI Center	54,927 / 54,927	$3,549,885
August 14	Washington, D.C.	United States	MCI Center	54,927 / 54,927	$3,549,885
August 17	Boston	United States	FleetCenter	49,085 / 49,085	$2,799,722
August 18	Boston	United States	FleetCenter	49,085 / 49,085	$2,799,722
August 19	Boston	United States	FleetCenter	49,085 / 49,085	$2,799,722
August 22	Philadelphia	United States	Wachovia Center	56,624 / 56,624	$3,450,758
August 23	Philadelphia	United States	Wachovia Center	56,624 / 56,624	$3,450,758
August 24	Philadelphia	United States	Wachovia Center	56,624 / 56,624	$3,450,758
August 27	Denver	United States	Pepsi Center	34,348 / 34,348	$2,207,112
August 28	Denver	United States	Pepsi Center	34,348 / 34,348	$2,207,112
August 30	Seattle	United States	KeyArena	30,282 / 30,282	$1,688,379
August 31	Seattle	United States	KeyArena	30,282 / 30,282	$1,688,379
September 1	Portland	United States	Rose Garden Arena	13,271 / 13,271	$897,300
September 3	Sacramento	United States	ARCO Arena	16,334 / 16,334	$908,656
September 4	Fresno	United States	Save Mart Center	14,940 / 14,940	$770,623
September 5	San Diego	United States	Cox Arena	12,545 / 12,545	$918,333
September 7	West Valley City	United States	USANA Amphitheater		
September 9	Oakland	United States	Oakland Arena	16,492 / 16,492	$949,192
September 10	San Jose	United States	HP Pavilion	33,534 / 33,534	$1,838,670
September 11	San Jose	United States	HP Pavilion	33,534 / 33,534	$1,838,670
Total				1,240,269 / 1,240,269 (100%)	$75,515,157

== Band ==
- Lead vocals & guitar – Prince
- Rhythm guitar – Mike Scott
- Bass – Rhonda Smith
- Drums – John Blackwell
- Keyboards – Renato Neto and Rad
- Saxophones – Maceo Parker and Candy Dulfer
- Trombone – Greg Boyer
- Keys — Chance Howard
