= Cinnamon Girl (Prince song) =

- UK CD single

Single by Prince

from the album Musicology
- B-side: "Dear Mr. Man (Live at Webster Hall)" (UK CD single); "United States of Division" (UK CD single); "Dear Mr. Man (Live at Webster Hall Video)" (UK CD single); "Cinnamon Girl (Video)" (NPG CD single); "Cinnamon Girl: Xposed (Making of the Video)" (NPG CD single)
- Released: September 7, 2004
- Recorded: January 2003
- Studio: Paisley Park, Chanhassen, Minnesota, US
- Genre: Psychedelic pop; pop rock
- Length: 3:56
- Label: NPG
- Songwriter: Prince
- Producer: Prince

Prince singles chronology
"Musicology" (2004)	"Cinnamon Girl" (2004)	"S.S.T." (2005)

Alternative cover
- NPG Enhanced CD cover

"Cinnamon Girl" is a song by American musician Prince. It was released as the second single from his 2004 album Musicology.

The single has been released in several formats. On September 6, 2004, the European CD single was released with four tracks: "Cinnamon Girl" (Album version), "Dear Mr. Man" (live at Webster Hall) "United States of Division" (which had been available only as a download) and an MPEG video of the "Dear Mr. Man" performance. Two weeks later, a similar single was released, but without the video. In November of the same year, Prince's NPG Music Club online retail store sold an Enhanced CD including the audio track, its music video, the lyrics and a five-minute segment of interviews and behind-the-scenes footage.

Despite not charting in the US, the single nearly cracked the Top 40 of the UK, reaching number 43.

== Music video ==
=== Plot ===
The song's music video follows a Muslim schoolgirl. After a terrorist attack involving an airplane, assumed to be the September 11 attacks, she faces racism from her classmates. As she returns home, she sees Arabic store signs being replaced by English-language ones, and her strict Muslim parents scold her. Following the interactions, she is depicted walking into a crowded airport, detonating a bomb that kills herself and others. However, the video then rewinds, showing that the attack was only a dream. At several points in the video, Prince appears, singing and playing guitar.

=== Production ===
The music video was directed by Phil Harder, with Keisha Castle-Hughes starring as the schoolgirl. The video employs stylized, illustrated animation, with a high-contrast background colored black and beige. Harder achieved the look by placing black-and-white images on top of watercolors. The explosion scene, which lasts only a few seconds, took about 60 separate watercolors to animate. Billboard reported that Prince "gave Harder much room for creativity" but closely followed the production process. Harder explained the video as showing "how far can her imagination go when the world comes down on her pretty heavy... None of it’s literal, but you get the picture."

=== Reception ===
Upon its release, the music video received criticism from some outlets, while others praised the clip. The New York Post opined that it "might be the most tasteless video ever", while political commentator John Gibson accused Prince of "causing trouble" during an appearance on Fox. Conservative commentator Michelle Malkin wrote on her blog that the video was "a washed-up pop star's crass exploitation of post-9/11 race-card-playing by Arab-American apologists for terror". The president of the Jewish Community Relations Council of Minnesota praised the video's "anti-harassment message" but took issue with the bombing scene, calling it "misguided and offensive" and concluding that "Her frustration is understandable. The violence is not."

In contrast, Rolling Stone music editor Joe Levy argued that the video's context mattered, as the song acknowledges that Arab Americans faced hate in the aftermath of 9/11. Rana Abbas, the deputy director of the American Arab Anti-Discrimination Committee's Midwest chapter, said that the video was "shocking, but in a good way", praising Prince as "the first major recording artist to address the prejudice and issues" experienced by Arab Americans after 9/11. Prince declined to publicly comment on the video, with his publicist telling CBS News that "he prefers that people make up their own mind". However, Harder defended the video, emphasizing to CBS News that the video ends without violence, and telling Billboard that "Kids are seeing real death and war on television. Kids are smarter than people think and know what’s going on in the world... The main motivation is to get people to talk about it." In August 2005, Jake Coyle, writing for the Associated Press, argued that the video "should win" the award for Best R&B Video at that year's VMAs, calling it "the only genuinely thought-provoking video" of the last year.

The video was first available for streaming on Yahoo! and the website for Prince's NPG Music Club. It was released to cable music networks the week of October 15, 2004. MTV planned to begin airing the video on MTVU in late October, to test viewer response, while VH1 and BET were initially "undecided" about airing the video.

== Legacy ==
In 2019, The Guardian ranked "Cinnamon Girl" Prince's 43rd-best single, calling it "straightforwardly enjoyable" and reminiscent of Around the World in a Day. In 2021, the Los Angeles Times placed "Cinnamon Girl" at number 60 on their ranking of Prince's singles, describing it as "Prince's stab at Beggars Banquet-era Rolling Stones".

== Track listing ==
=== UK/German CD single ===
1. "Cinnamon Girl" – 3:56
2. "Dear Mr. Man" (Live at Webster Hall) – 4:14
3. "United States of Division" – 6:18
4. "Dear Mr. Man" (Live at Webster Hall Video) – 4:14

=== NPG Enhanced CD single ===
1. "Cinnamon Girl" – 3:56
2. "Cinnamon Girl" (Video) – 4:04
3. "Cinnamon Girl: Xposed" (Making of the Video) – 5:15

== Charts ==
Weekly chart performance for "Cinnamon Girl"
Chart (2004)	Peak position
Germany (GfK)	89
Hungary (Dance Top 40)	33
Italy (FIMI)	29
Netherlands (Single Top 100)	34
Scottish Singles Sales (Official Charts)	54
UK Singles (Official Charts)	43
UK Hip Hop/R&B (Official Charts)	14
