= Halls of Stone =

- The Lord of the Rings: The Rings of Power episode
- Cover art for the episode's soundtrack album
- Episode no.: Season 2 Episode 5
- Directed by: Louise Hooper; Sanaa Hamri
- Written by: Nicholas Adams
- Cinematography by: Laurie Rose; Jean-Philippe Gossart
- Editing by: Dan Crinnion
- Original release date: September 12, 2024
- Running time: 61 minutes

Additional cast
- Kevin Eldon as Narvi; Amelia Kenworthy as Mirdania; Leon Wadham as Kemen; Ema Horvath as Eärien; Alex Tarrant as Valandil; Calam Lynch as Camnir; Sam Hazeldine as Adar; Rachel Payne as Brenna; Laura Jane Matthewson as Revna; Jeany Spark as the Commander of the South; Selina Lo as Rían; Charlie Rix as Vorohil; William Chubb as the High Priest of Númenor; Kai Martin as Zhor; Robert Strange as Glûg

Episode chronology
← Previous "Eldest"	Next → "Where Is He?"
- The Lord of the Rings: The Rings of Power season 2

"Halls of Stone" is the fifth episode of the second season of the American fantasy television series The Lord of the Rings: The Rings of Power, which is based on J. R. R. Tolkien's history of Middle-earth. It was written by Nicholas Adams and directed by Louise Hooper and Sanaa Hamri.

The series is set thousands of years before Tolkien's novel The Lord of the Rings (1954–55), during the Second Age of Middle-earth. This episode shows the Dwarves' reactions to their Rings of Power. Filming for the second season took place in the United Kingdom and on location in the Canary Islands from October 2022 to June 2023.

"Halls of Stone" premiered on the streaming service Amazon Prime Video on September 12, 2024. It was estimated to have high viewership, though there was a drop from the previous week. The episode received generally positive reviews, particularly for the performances of Charlie Vickers as Sauron and Charles Edwards as Celebrimbor.

== Background ==
The Lord of the Rings: The Rings of Power is based on J. R. R. Tolkien's history of Middle-earth. It is set thousands of years before his novels The Hobbit (1937) and The Lord of the Rings (1954–55). While it is contractually not a continuation of Peter Jackson's The Lord of the Rings (2001–2003) and The Hobbit (2012–2014) film trilogies, it is intended to be visually consistent with them. J. D. Payne and Patrick McKay were hired to develop the series and serve as its showrunners. Production moved from New Zealand to the United Kingdom starting with the second season, which was directed by Charlotte Brändström, Sanaa Hamri, and Louise Hooper.

The series covers the major events of Middle-earth's Second Age. Amazon did not acquire the rights to Tolkien's main Second Age writings, so the writers identified references to the period in The Hobbit, The Lord of the Rings, and the latter's appendices, and created a story that bridges those passages. The Second Age begins after the defeat of the "Dark Lord" Morgoth, when his army of Orcs are scattered and his lieutenant Sauron is in hiding. The large cast of characters includes Elves, Dwarves, Men, and Harfoots, the last being precursors to the diminutive Hobbits from The Hobbit and The Lord of the Rings. In the first season, Sauron disguises himself as the human "Halbrand" and deceives the Elves into creating three Rings of Power, while the Orcs use the eruption of Mount Doom to create their own realm, the dark land of Mordor.

== Plot ==
Seven Rings of Power are created for the Dwarves, and King Durin III uses one to rebuild their infrastructure and bring sunlight back to Khazad-dûm. The ring also makes the king greedy; he plans to delve deeper for riches, and requires the other Dwarf lords to give him half of their riches in exchange for the other rings. After his wife Disa discovers something evil living beneath the mines, Prince Durin IV warns his father to stop the mining but Durin III dismisses their concerns. He reinstates Durin IV as his heir.

In Eregion, where the rings were forged, Elf-smith Celebrimbor and Dwarven delve-master Narvi celebrate the seeming success of the Dwarven rings by unveiling a new Western gate for Khazad-dûm that they have crafted together: the Doors of Durin. Sauron, posing as Annatar the "Lord of Gifts", insists that they start work on rings for Men but Celebrimbor refuses to be involved, believing the risk of corruption with Men to be too high. While testing new ring designs with Annatar, Elf-smith Mirdania is transported to the unseen world and sees his horrifying true form. He convinces her that she actually saw Celebrimbor.

Ar-Pharazôn, the new king of Númenor, tasks his son Kemen with cracking down on members of the Faithful who remain loyal to former Queen Regent Míriel. Kemen interrupts a memorial service that Elendil and other members of the Faithful are holding in Númenor's oldest shrine. When Kemen destroys a sacred relic, Elendil lashes out which leads to a fight between Valandil and Kemen. Kemen kills Valandil and arrests Elendil.

Durin IV expresses his concerns about the Dwarven rings to Celebrimbor, who asks Annatar whether anything was done differently for them compared to the Elven rings. Annatar notes that Celebrimbor lied to High King Gil-galad about making more rings, suggesting that Celebrimbor's deception caused any negative aspects of the Dwarven rings. Celebrimbor agrees to make rings for Men in hopes of redeeming himself.

The Elf Elrond arrives in Lindon to warn Gil-galad that an Orc army led by Adar are marching to Eregion. Gil-galad deduces that Sauron has been manipulating them and believes the Elves cannot defeat both Sauron and Adar alone. As the Orcs arrive at the city, Adar proposes an alliance between himself and his Elf prisoner Galadriel.

== Production ==
=== Writing ===
"Halls of Stone" was written by Nicholas Adams. The title references a line from Tolkien's Ring Verse poem: "Seven [Rings] for the Dwarf-lords in their halls of stone".

=== Casting ===
The season's cast includes Cynthia Addai-Robinson as Míriel, Robert Aramayo as Elrond, Owain Arthur as Durin IV, Morfydd Clark as Galadriel, Charles Edwards as Celebrimbor, Trystan Gravelle as Ar-Pharazôn, Peter Mullan as Durin III, Sophia Nomvete as Disa, Lloyd Owen as Elendil, Charlie Vickers as Sauron, and Benjamin Walker as Gil-galad. Also starring in the episode are Kevin Eldon as Narvi, Amelia Kenworthy as Mirdania, Leon Wadham as Kemen, Ema Horvath as Eärien, Alex Tarrant as Valandil, Calam Lynch as Camnir, Sam Hazeldine as Adar, Rachel Payne as Brenna, Laura Jane Matthewson as Revna, Jeany Spark as the Commander of the South, Selina Lo as Rían, Charlie Rix as Vorohil, William Chubb as the High Priest of Númenor, Kai Martin as Zhor, and Robert Strange as Glûg.

=== Filming ===
Filming for the season began on October 3, 2022, under the working title LBP. Episodes were shot simultaneously based on the availability of locations and sets. Hooper and Hamri directed "Halls of Stone". Laurie Rose and Jean-Philippe Gossart were their respective cinematographers. The production wrapped in early June 2023.

=== Visual effects ===
Visual effects for the episode were created by The Yard VFX, Industrial Light & Magic (ILM), DNEG, Outpost VFX, Rodeo FX, Midas VFX, Monsters Aliens Robots Zombies, Untold Studios, Atomic Arts, and Cantina Creative. The different vendors were overseen by visual effects supervisor Jason Smith.

=== Music ===
The Lord of the Rings: The Rings of Power (Season Two, Episode Five: Halls of Stone – Amazon Original Series Soundtrack)

Film score by Bear McCreary
- Released: September 12, 2024
- Genres: Orchestra; choir; world
- Length: 40:11
- Languages: English; Constructed languages
- Labels: Amazon; Mutant

Bear McCreary chronology
Eldest (2024)	Halls of Stone (2024)	Where Is He? (2024)

A soundtrack album featuring composer Bear McCreary's score for the episode was released digitally on the streaming service Amazon Music on September 12, 2024. McCreary said the series' episodic albums contained "virtually every second of score" from their respective episodes. It was added to other music streaming services after the full second season was released. A CD featuring the episode's music is included in a limited edition box set collection for the season from Mutant and McCreary's label Sparks & Shadows. The box set was announced in October 2025, and includes a journal written by McCreary which details the creation of the episode's score. All music was composed by Bear McCreary:

Track listing
No.	Title	Length
1.	"Seven for the Dwarf-lords"	4:47
2.	"Unveiling the Doors of Durin"	3:16
3.	"Gazing to Eressëa"	5:35
4.	"Gil-galad's Vision"	2:12
5.	"Disa in the Depths"	4:35
6.	"Mirdania Emerges"	3:33
7.	"Assault on the Faithful" (featuring Clydene Jackson)	4:42
8.	"Deceit in the Craft"	9:05
9.	"Sauron's Design"	2:26
Total length:		40:11

== Release ==
"Halls of Stone" premiered on the streaming service Amazon Prime Video on September 12, 2024. It was released at the same time around the world, in more than 240 countries and territories. Ahead of the third season's release in November 2026, a home media release for the first two seasons was announced. Each release features the eight episodes of the respective season along with behind-the-scenes content. They were released on 4K Ultra HD, Blu-ray, and DVD on November 3, and in limited edition 4K UHD SteelBook—with Amazon exclusive collectable art cards—on December 1.

== Reception ==
=== Viewership ===
Luminate, which gathers viewership data from smart TVs, said the series was watched for 372.7 million minutes in the week ending September 12. This was a drop of more than 50 percent from the previous week and placed it fourth on the company's chart. Selome Hailu of Variety noted that there was less new material to watch during the week, which included several days of viewership for the fourth episode in addition to the fifth episode's debut, but still felt the drop did not "bode well" for the series. Whip Media, which tracks viewership data for the 25 million worldwide users of its TV Time app, again listed the series second—behind Hulu's Only Murders in the Building—on its US streaming chart for the week ending September 15. Nielsen Media Research, which records streaming viewership on US television screens, estimated that The Rings of Power had 747 million minutes viewed in the week ending September 15. This was below the previous two weeks which both had more than 1 billion minutes viewed for the series, but good enough for it to remain the second biggest original streaming series of the week behind Netflix's The Perfect Couple. Samba TV, which also gathers viewership data from smart TVs, listed the series sixth on its chart of top streaming programs for the week ending September 15.

=== Critical response ===
On review aggregator Rotten Tomatoes, 85% of 13 critics gave the episode a positive review and the average of rated reviews was 7.1 out of 10.

Leon Miller of Polygon praised the episode as the best of the season so far and highlighted its focus on Sauron's ability to manipulate others, a key element for the character during the Second Age that is not explored in Tolkien's The Lord of the Rings or Jackson's films. He added that the episode was a "solid platform" for the rest of the season to build on. Reviewing the episode for The A.V. Club, Matt Schimkowitz graded it a "B-" and praised the performances of Vickers and Edwards. He said the episode was "a little heavy on plot and light on spectacle" and felt the main storyline was moving "a little quickly for Tolkien", but found Sauron's deception of Celebrimbor to be more fun than the first season's story due to the audience being aware of Sauron's plans. Schimkowitz also found the Númenor scenes to be effective due to "the shorthand of Kemen being a total prick", despite there being little time in the episode and season dedicated to that storyline. Samantha Nelson at IGN gave the episode 7 out of 10 and also said it was the best of the season so far, attributing this to it not including the season's Southlanders and Rhûn storylines. She praised the episode's main story and the performances of Vickers and Edwards, but thought the strength of their scenes showed how "one dimensional" the Númenor characters are.

Collider's Arezou Amin gave the episode 8 out of 10 and praised the way it brought the stakes of the season's plotlines together and focused on Sauron's manipulations of different characters. Keith Phipps of Vulture gave the episode three stars out of five and said the main storyline was compelling and intense, while the scenes in Númenor were less so and came across as simplistic with the "straight-up sneering villainous turns from Kemen and Eärien". He found the episode to be well-plotted despite inconsistencies in the time it took different characters to travel between locations. Writing for Gizmodo, James Whitbrook said the increase of pace in the episode was "a kick up the rear Rings of Power needed to get this season into high gear", but he felt it came at the expense of rushing key storylines: King Durin III becoming corrupted by his ring, Sauron's manipulations of Celebrimbor leading to his downfall, and the rising civil war in Númenor. Whitbrook partially attributed this to the showrunners' decision to condense the events of the Second Age into a short period of time, meaning events that take place over centuries in Tolkien's history have to play out far quicker in the series. He said the series needed to "find a middle-ground to actually develop its characters [or] the impact of the spectacle to come is going to be blunted".

== Companion media ==
An episode of the aftershow Inside The Rings of Power for "Halls of Stone" was released on September 12, 2024. It features actress Felicia Day, the host of The Official The Lord of the Rings: The Rings of Power Podcast, interviewing the showrunners and cast members Arthur and Owen about the making of the episode, with some behind-the-scenes footage.
