= Where Is He? =

- The Lord of the Rings: The Rings of Power episode
- Cover art for the episode's soundtrack album
- Episode no.: Season 2 Episode 6
- Directed by: Sanaa Hamri
- Written by: Justin Doble
- Cinematography by: Jean-Philippe Gossart
- Editing by: Kate Baird
- Original release date: September 19, 2024
- Running time: 63 minutes

Additional cast
- Sam Hazeldine as Adar; Rory Kinnear as Tom Bombadil; Amelia Kenworthy as Mirdania; Will Keen as Belzagar; Leon Wadham as Kemen; Ema Horvath as Eärien; Tanya Moodie as Gundabale Earthauler; Gavi Singh Chera as Merimac; Kevin Eldon as Narvi; Simon Haines as Malendol; Arkie Reece as Kilta; Peter Landi as Marmadas; William Chubb as the High Priest of Númenor; Robert Strange as Glûg; Kai Martin as Zhor

Episode chronology
← Previous "Halls of Stone"	Next → "Doomed to Die"
- The Lord of the Rings: The Rings of Power season 2

"Where Is He?" is the sixth episode of the second season of the American fantasy television series The Lord of the Rings: The Rings of Power, which is based on J. R. R. Tolkien's history of Middle-earth. It was written by Justin Doble and directed by Sanaa Hamri.

The series is set thousands of years before Tolkien's novel The Lord of the Rings (1954–55), during the Second Age of Middle-earth. Filming for the second season took place in the United Kingdom and on location in the Canary Islands from October 2022 to June 2023.

"Where Is He?" premiered on the streaming service Amazon Prime Video on September 19, 2024. It was estimated to have high viewership and received generally positive reviews.

== Background ==
The Lord of the Rings: The Rings of Power is based on J. R. R. Tolkien's history of Middle-earth. It is set thousands of years before his novels The Hobbit (1937) and The Lord of the Rings (1954–55). While it is contractually not a continuation of Peter Jackson's The Lord of the Rings (2001–2003) and The Hobbit (2012–2014) film trilogies, it is intended to be visually consistent with them. J. D. Payne and Patrick McKay were hired to develop the series and serve as its showrunners. Production moved from New Zealand to the United Kingdom starting with the second season, which was directed by Charlotte Brändström, Sanaa Hamri, and Louise Hooper.

The series covers the major events of Middle-earth's Second Age. Amazon did not acquire the rights to Tolkien's main Second Age writings, so the writers identified references to the period in The Hobbit, The Lord of the Rings, and the latter's appendices, and created a story that bridges those passages. The Second Age begins after the defeat of the "Dark Lord" Morgoth, when his army of Orcs are scattered and his lieutenant Sauron is in hiding. The large cast of characters includes Elves, Dwarves, Men, and Harfoots, the last being precursors to the diminutive Hobbits from The Hobbit and The Lord of the Rings. In the first season, Sauron disguises himself as the human "Halbrand" and deceives the Elves into creating three Rings of Power, while the Orcs use the eruption of Mount Doom to create their own realm, the dark land of Mordor.

== Plot ==
The Elf Arondir comes across several Orcs who are carrying a map. In Eregion, Elf-smith Celebrimbor is increasingly focused on making Rings of Power for Men. Sauron, posing as Annatar the "Lord of Gifts", offers to take care of Eregion's administration. Outside the city, Orc leader Adar tells captive Elf Galadriel that Morgoth's crown destroyed Sauron's previous physical form and he believes it could destroy him for good if combined with Galadriel's Ring of Power.

In Númenor, Elendil is accused of treason for refusing to pledge loyalty to the new king, Ar-Pharazôn, and continuing to follow the ways of the Faithful who believe former Queen Regent Míriel is the true monarch. Ar-Pharazôn plans to decide Elendil's fate with a "sea trial", where he is dropped into an abyss in the sea to face a giant sea monster called the Sea Worm. Because his supposed crimes were committed in her name, Míriel claims the right to be tried in Elendil's stead. The Sea Worm spares her life and the Faithful hail her as the "Queen of the Sea".

The mysterious Tom Bombadil takes the Stranger to a forest of dead trees in the eastern land of Rhûn where he is meant to find a magic staff. The Stranger has a vision of his Harfoot friends Nori Brandyfoot and Poppy Proudfellow being threatened by a Dark Wizard and wishes to help them; Tom says he must decide between helping his friends and fulfilling his destiny.

Sauron goes to Khazad-dûm to ask the Dwarves for more mithril, but he is turned away by King Durin III who plans to exploit the mithril for profit. While there, Sauron senses the presence of a Balrog. Prince Durin IV is concerned about the influence Durin III's Ring of Power has over him and attempts to take it, but is unable to. He and his wife Disa try to prevent more dangerous actions by blocking the entrance to the mithril mine.

Realizing that Sauron lured Adar's army to Eregion because he does not have an army of his own, Galadriel pleads with Adar to not go ahead with his attack but he ignores her and begins besieging Eregion. Celebrimbor hears the siege alarm but Sauron uses an illusion to convince him that all is well. Sauron gives Celebrimbor a container to use in making the rings which he claims to be mithril from Khazad-dûm.

== Production ==
=== Development ===
"Where Is He?" was written by Justin Doble.

=== Casting ===
The season's cast includes Cynthia Addai-Robinson as Míriel, Owain Arthur as Durin IV, Morfydd Clark as Galadriel, Ismael Cruz Córdova as Arondir, Charles Edwards as Celebrimbor, Trystan Gravelle as Ar-Pharazôn, Ciarán Hinds as the Dark Wizard, Markella Kavenagh as Elanor "Nori" Brandyfoot, Peter Mullan as Durin III, Sophia Nomvete as Disa, Lloyd Owen as Elendil, Megan Richards as Poppy Proudfellow, Charlie Vickers as Sauron, and Daniel Weyman as the Stranger. Also starring in the episode are Sam Hazeldine as Adar, Rory Kinnear as Tom Bombadil, Amelia Kenworthy as Mirdania, Will Keen as Belzagar, Leon Wadham as Kemen, Ema Horvath as Eärien, Tanya Moodie as Gundabale Earthauler, Gavi Singh Chera as Merimac, Kevin Eldon as Narvi, Simon Haines as Malendol, Arkie Reece as Kilta, Peter Landi as Marmadas, William Chubb as the High Priest of Númenor, Robert Strange as Glûg, and Kai Martin as Zhor. Josh Dyer, John Macdonald, and Luke Tumber play unnamed Orc defectors in the episode.

=== Filming ===
Filming for the season began on October 3, 2022, under the working title LBP. Episodes were shot simultaneously based on the availability of locations and sets. Hamri directed "Where Is He?". Jean-Philippe Gossart was her cinematographer. The production wrapped in early June 2023.

=== Visual effects ===
Visual effects for the episode were created by Industrial Light & Magic (ILM), Rodeo FX, Outpost VFX, DNEG, The Yard VFX, Midas VFX, Monsters Aliens Robots Zombies, Untold Studios, Atomic Arts, and Cantina Creative. The different vendors were overseen by visual effects supervisor Jason Smith.

=== Music ===
The Lord of the Rings: The Rings of Power (Season Two, Episode Six: Where Is He? – Amazon Original Series Soundtrack)

Film score by Bear McCreary
- Released: September 19, 2024
- Genres: Orchestra; choir; world
- Length: 39:59
- Languages: English; Constructed languages
- Labels: Amazon; Mutant

Bear McCreary chronology
Halls of Stone (2024)	Where Is He? (2024)	Doomed to Die (2024)

A soundtrack album featuring composer Bear McCreary's score for the episode was released digitally on the streaming service Amazon Music on September 19, 2024. McCreary said the series' episodic albums contained "virtually every second of score" from their respective episodes. It was added to other music streaming services after the full second season was released. A CD featuring the episode's music is included in a limited edition box set collection for the season from Mutant and McCreary's label Sparks & Shadows. The box set was announced in October 2025, and includes a journal written by McCreary which details the creation of the episode's score. All music was composed by Bear McCreary:

Track listing
No.	Title	Length
1.	"Celebrimbor's Burden"	4:39
2.	"The Crown of Morgoth"	3:43
3.	"Accused in Númenor"	2:35
4.	"The Secret Fire"	6:25
5.	"Tempest of Bats"	5:29
6.	"Trial by Abyss"	5:48
7.	"The Legions of Adar"	5:19
8.	"Sauron's Illusion"	3:29
9.	"The Siege Begins"	2:32
Total length:		39:59

== Release ==
"Where Is He?" premiered on the streaming service Amazon Prime Video on September 19, 2024. It was released at the same time around the world, in more than 240 countries and territories. Ahead of the third season's release in November 2026, a home media release for the first two seasons was announced. Each release features the eight episodes of the respective season along with behind-the-scenes content. They were released on 4K Ultra HD, Blu-ray, and DVD on November 3, and in limited edition 4K UHD SteelBook—with Amazon exclusive collectable art cards—on December 1.

== Reception ==
=== Viewership ===
Luminate, which gathers viewership data from smart TVs, said the series was watched for 346.4 million minutes in the week ending September 19, which included several days of viewership for the fifth episode in addition to the sixth episode's debut. This was a small drop from the previous week and placed it fifth on the company's chart. Whip Media, which tracks viewership data for the 25 million worldwide users of its TV Time app, listed the series third—behind Hulu's Only Murders in the Building and Disney+'s Agatha All Along—on its US streaming chart for the week ending September 22. Nielsen Media Research, which records streaming viewership on US television screens, estimated that The Rings of Power had 829 million minutes viewed in the week ending September 22. This made it the third biggest original streaming series of the week behind Netflix's Monsters: The Lyle and Erik Menendez Story and The Perfect Couple. Samba TV, which also gathers viewership data from smart TVs, listed the series eighth on its chart of top streaming programs for the week ending September 22.

=== Critical response ===
On review aggregator Rotten Tomatoes, 83% of 12 critics gave the episode a positive review and the average of rated reviews was 6.8 out of 10.

Matt Schimkowitz of The A.V. Club graded the episode a "B". He was frustrated by the use of Tom Bombadil as a "plot cog" and the fact that the Stranger's journey to find a staff was not actually shown in the episode, but was positive about Elendil's role and the performance of Keen as Lord Belzagar. Schimkowitz also praised the discussion between Galadriel and Adar about their respective experiences being deceived by Sauron. Arezou Amin at Collider gave the episode 8 out of 10. She said the scenes in which Sauron deceives Celebrimbor were the scariest of the season so far, praised the way that Sauron's threat was bringing most of the season's plots together, and was also positive about Elendil and Míriel. On the other hand, Amin felt the forward momentum of different storylines was being unevenly distributed. Keith Phipps of Vulture gave the episode three stars out of five and noted that the season was moving even faster in its second half than the first, with this episode feeling particularly fast due to it including most of the season's storylines. He said there was a "trade-off", not liking that the Stranger's storyline "feels truncated" but being happy with the reduced focus on Númenor scenes. He was also happy with some of the episode's slower scenes, such as the dinner conversation between Galadriel and Adar.

Writing for Gizmodo, James Whitbrook was more positive about the episode than the previous one. He highlighted the Eregion and Khazad-dûm storylines and particularly praised Arthur's performance for Durin IV struggling with turning against his father. Whitbrook was less positive about the Númenor storyline, saying: "If last week was about how inauthentically sudden Pharazôn's rise to power felt, this week is mostly about how inauthentically sudden his momentary comeuppance feels". Leon Miller of Polygon found "Where Is He?" to be the least satisfying of the season's last few episodes, though he praised the visuals for helping "even the less well-conceived story beats in [the episode] go down smoothly enough". His review focused mostly on the portrayal of "power plays and political wheelings and dealings" which he felt were more appropriate for fellow fantasy series House of the Dragon than an adaption of Tolkien's works, and which he said the writers of The Rings of Power often rushed or oversimplified. Samantha Nelson at IGN gave the episode 5 out of 10 and called it frustrating, feeling that some characters—particularly Adar—were making out-of-character decisions simply to let the story build to the season's climactic battle. Nelson considered the scenes with Durin IV and Disa to be the highlight of the episode.

== Companion media ==
An episode of the aftershow Inside The Rings of Power for "Where Is He?" was released on September 19, 2024. It features actress Felicia Day, the host of The Official The Lord of the Rings: The Rings of Power Podcast, interviewing Hamri and McCreary about the making of the episode, with some behind-the-scenes footage.
