= Joseph A. McPhillips III =

- Born: 1937; Mobile, Alabama
- Died: June 11, 2007 (aged 70); Tangier, Morocco
- Occupations: Headmaster, Teacher
- Relatives: Caroline Meador (sister), Dr. Frank McPhillips (brother), Frank McPhillips MD

Joseph A. McPhillips III (1937 – June 11, 2007) was an American teacher who moved to Tangier, Morocco, in 1962 to teach at the American School of Tangier, remaining as headmaster for 37 years.

== Biography ==
McPhillips was born in 1937 in Mobile, Alabama, and graduated from Phillips Academy, Andover, and Princeton University (1958). McPhillips came to Tangier in 1962 to teach English literature at the American School, established in 1950, and the oldest American school in Morocco. In 1973, he succeeded Omar Pound as headmaster, beginning a tenure that would span for four decades and define the institution's standards and values.

McPhillips told the Washington Post, in a 2003 interview, that the American School was "the Andover of the Mediterranean. We provide an old-fashioned education. Students rise when adults come into the room. They read Lord Jim and Julius Caesar. There's not a lot of ancillary nonsense in the curriculum." As well as a rigorous and passionate teacher and administrator, McPhillips was a theater director. His annual American School plays became a Tangier tradition, and since 1964 he directed more than 20 of them. McPhillips's direction and production turned the convention of high school play into high-quality dramatic art. The 1992 production of Euripides Hippolytos, in Arabic, featured an original Paul Bowles score and costumes designed by Yves St. Laurent. His staging of Tennessee Williams' Camino Real in Tangier's Petit Socco plaza was the fulfillment of McPhillips's promise to the playwright. In his hands, the school's annual Christmas play was based on the Koranic version of the Bethlehem story.

Among his many friends in Tangier and abroad, McPhillips had a long friendship with Jane and Paul Bowles, and at Bowles' death became executor of the Bowles estate, a responsibility that began with personally transporting the urn carrying Bowles to his family in New York State. McPhillips, who lived in Morocco continuously until his death, told the Washington Post: "I asked Paul once, 'You've lived outside America so long, and you've traveled so extensively. Do you still feel American?' He simply said, 'I am American. I always will be.'"

In 1995, McPhillips established The American School of Marrakesh, a sister institution to the Tangier school, that began with first graders and grew up with its pupils, and 12 years later McPhillips was looking forward to the graduation of that first class. Over his career, McPhillips's forceful and uncompromising personality left an indelible stamp on thousands of young people, and made him a national treasure for his adoptive home country of Morocco. The day before McPhillips' death, he confirmed graduation plans and oversaw a rehearsal of this year's play, Edward Albee's Zoo Story, in the Salle Beckett in Tangier. With his usual enthusiasm, he told his two young actors it was "the best American School play ever." The play was staged as scheduled on June 14. The American School graduation took place, as scheduled, on June 15, with the United States Ambassador to Morocco Thomas T. Riley, American troubadour Jimmy Buffett, and representatives of the Moroccan government and royal family in attendance.

McPhillips died on June 11, 2007, at his home on the Old Mountain Road, in Tangier, aged 70 years old.

A memorial book from McPhillips's international circle of friends is planned, and written contributions are welcome. The American School of Tangier plans to establish a Joseph A. McPhillips III Fund in his memory, and encourages donations to the fund in lieu of flowers. Joseph McPhillips is survived by a sister, Caroline Meador, and a brother, Frank McPhillips Jr., both of Mobile, Alabama, and numerous nieces and nephews.

McPhillips expressed his wish to be buried on the grounds of the American School of Tangier, but he was buried in Boubana Cemetery in Tangier, after a memorial service held at the Spanish Cathedral that was attended by hundreds of friends, admirers and family members.
