= American School of Marrakesh =

The American School of Marrakesh
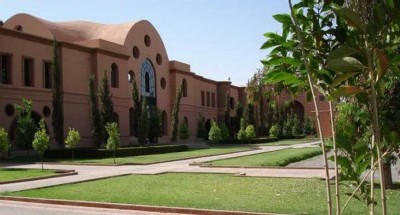

Location
- Marrakesh; Morocco; 31°36′45″N 7°54′18″W

Information
- Type: Non-profit
- Motto: Integrity, Responsibility, Respect and Excellence.
- Established: 1995
- Headmaster: Stephen Morison, Jr.
- Grades: PreK - 12
- Gender: Co-educational
- Enrollment: 420
- Language: English
- Accreditation: MSA
- Website: www.asm.ac.ma

The American School of Marrakesh (ASM) is a not-for-profit, independent school in Marrakesh, Morocco. It offers classes from kindergarten through 12th grade.

== History ==
The American School of Marrakesh was established in 1995 by the leadership of the American School of Tangier. The American School of Marrakesh was intended by its founders to be a model institution that integrates the best practices of an American education with the values and traditions of the Kingdom of Morocco.

Under the early guidance of Joe McPhillips, Headmaster of the American School of Tangier for thirty-five years, and Mrs. Audrey Riffi, the American School of Marrakesh’s first Head of School, the lower school opened its doors in rented facilities in a villa with two teachers. It moved into its present purpose-built facility on eight hectares of land in stages. The lower school wing opened on September 15, 2001, and the upper school wing opened on March 27, 2002. Led by Head of School Mr. Josh Shoemake, ASM added grades each year and quickly developed into a vibrant school community that graduated its first senior class in 2008.

Designed by Charles Boccara and landscaped by Madison Cox, the present school facility is a tribute to the combined efforts of its teachers, parents, staff, administrators, board members, and friends of the school. Its brick-red, Post-Modernist buildings executed with appreciative nods to Hispano-Maghrebi traditional architecture are a wonderful compliment to the school's progressive approach to study and learning.

== Curriculum ==
An independent private institution located on the outskirts of Marrakesh, Morocco, ASM offers English-language, American-system education from kindergarten through 12th grade. The school follows AERO standards (American Education Reaches Out) from grades 1 to 10 and offers the International Baccalaureate Diploma Program (IBDP) during grades 11 and 12. ASM is fully accredited by the Middle States Association (MSA) of Colleges and Schools and the International Baccalaureate Organization (IBO). Lower school students follow the i-Ready curriculum in English and mathematics, and they adhere to the standards of the International Baccalaureate Primary Years Program (IBPYP) which emphasizes student-led and hands-on learning. At the high school level, students must take four years of math, four years of English, four years of history, and four years of science in order to graduate. Arabic is offered in Grades K-12 while French is introduced in Grade 2. Both languages are considered core curriculum classes that all students are required to take. To accommodate students who join the school with little to no French or Arabic, the school offers several levels: Advanced, Standard, and Arabic/French for beginners.
