= American School of Tangier =

Coordinates: 35.775121°N 5.824187°W

- Arabic: المدرسة الأمریکیة بطنجة
- Tangier; Morocco

Information
- Established: 1950
- Grades: Preschool - Grade 12
- Language: English

American School of Tangier (AST; Arabic: المدرسة الأمریکیة بطنجة) is an American international school in Tangier, Morocco, serving preschool through grade 12. In Morocco it is considered a non-profit organization, and AST is incorporated in the U.S. state of Delaware as a 501(c)(3) nonprofit. AST is accredited by the Middle States Association of Colleges and Schools.

The American School of Tangier was founded in 1950 by a group of American, Moroccan and citizens of other nationalities that wanted an American system of education in Tangier. Among its early directors was Dr. Robert Smith Shea who served from 1953-1960., when the city was a part of the Tangier International Zone. Joseph McPhillips III served as the headmaster of AST for 35 years.

== Operations ==
The school uses English as the medium of instruction in most courses, while Arabic and French courses have their respective languages as their mediums of instruction.

Persons residing in the U.S. and persons residing in Morocco are members of the school's board of trustees.

== Campus ==
Athletic facilities include an outdoor pool, a soccer field, and a gymnasium.

The Nancy Eastman Library serves as the school library.

The school offers dormitory facilities for people visiting the school.

== Student body ==
As of 2025 the school had 500 students, served by 64 faculty members.
