= Call My Name (Prince song) =

Promotional single by Prince

from the album Musicology
- Released: May 21, 2004
- Recorded: May 2001
- Studio: Paisley Park, Chanhassen, Minnesota, US
- Genre: Neo soul, R&B
- Length: 5:18
- Label: NPG
- Songwriter: Prince
- Producer: Prince

"Call My Name" is a song by Prince, from his 2004 album Musicology. The song won Grammy Award for Best Male R&B Vocal Performance at the 47th Annual Grammy Awards in 2005.

Although it was not officially released as a single, it peaked at number 75 on the Billboard Hot 100 and 27 on the R&B chart. A music video for the song was filmed as well.

== Charts ==
Chart performance for "Call My Name"
Chart (2004)	Peak position
US Billboard Hot 100	75
US Hot R&B/Hip-Hop Songs (Billboard)	27
