= Musicology (album) =

Studio album by Prince
- Released: March 29, 2004
- Recorded: May 3, 1997 ("A Million Days" basic tracking); February 11, 1999 – early 2004
- Studios: Metalworks, Mississauga; Paisley Park, Chanhassen
- Genres: Funk; psychedelic pop
- Length: 47:26
- Languages: English; Italian
- Labels: NPG; Columbia
- Producer: Prince

Prince chronology
C-Note (2004)	Musicology (2004)	The Chocolate Invasion (2004)

Singles from Musicology
- 1. "Musicology" Released: April 3, 2004; 2. "Cinnamon Girl" Released: September 7, 2004

Musicology is the twenty-eighth studio album by American recording artist Prince. The album was given to concertgoers at his Musicology Tour, from March 27 to September 9, 2004, in North America. A digital release followed two days after his tour started on March 29, 2004. The physical retail version was released on April 19, 2004 (Europe) and April 20, 2004 (US) by NPG Records and distributed by Columbia Records. Musicology was the first album in five years (ten as Prince) that Prince released through a major label (Sony Music) and, being partially recorded in Mississauga, Ontario, Canada, was his first to be recorded outside Minneapolis in many years. Musicology is R&B-themed.

Receiving generally positive reviews from music critics and benefiting from the novel ticket-bundling stratagem, Musicology became Prince's most successful record in years, peaking at number three on the Billboard 200 and reaching top 10 in ten other countries. It was Prince's first album to chart in the US since The Rainbow Children (2001).

Prince won Grammy Awards for Best Traditional R&B Vocal Performance for "Musicology" and Best Male R&B Vocal Performance for "Call My Name". By January 2005, Musicology was certified double platinum by the Recording Industry Association of America (RIAA). At the time of release, Prince was quoted as saying he wished Musicology to provide musical education to listeners.

== Commercial performance ==
Musicology quickly proved to be Prince's most successful album since Diamonds and Pearls, reaching the Top 5 in the United States, United Kingdom and Germany and making an impression on charts around the world. It was also well-received by music critics. The title track was released as a single in Australia and Europe, where it enjoyed moderate chart success and airplay. However it was also a hit on the US R&B charts through airplay. The album was certified platinum by the RIAA in June 2004 and was certified double platinum in late January 2005.

Album sales were boosted by the bundling of a copy of Musicology with each ticket sold for the Musicology Tour. This prompted Billboard magazine and Nielsen SoundScan to change its chart data methodology. For future album releases, Billboard said that customers "must be given an option to either add the CD to the ticket purchase or forgo the CD for a reduced ticket-only price". A purple vinyl edition was released in February 2019.

== Critical reception ==
Professional ratings
Aggregate scores
Source	Rating
Metacritic	72/100
Review scores
Source	Rating
AllMusic	3.5/5 stars
Chicago Sun-Times	3/4 stars
Entertainment Weekly	B−
The Guardian	(2004) (2016)
Mojo	4/5 stars
NME	6/10
Pitchfork	5.8/10
Q	4/5 stars
Rolling Stone	4/5 stars
Slant Magazine	3.5/5 stars

Musicology received generally positive reviews from music critics. In his review for The Village Voice, critic Robert Christgau said that after the album's opening uptempo songs, "pleasant shocks lurk near the surface and go against the flow of the quality material, and almost everything packs payback". In a less enthusiastic review, Mojo magazine found it better produced and performed than it was written.

== Accolades ==
Prince won two Grammy Awards, for Best Traditional R&B Vocal Performance ("Musicology") and Best R&B Vocal Performance—Male ("Call My Name"), and was nominated for Best Pop Vocal Performance—Male ("Cinnamon Girl"), Best R&B Song (awarded to the songwriter) ("Call My Name"), and Best R&B Album (Musicology). Prince was chosen by Rolling Stone magazine's readers as the best male performer and most welcome comeback.

== Tour ==
Prince toured North America from March 27 to September 9, 2004, to promote Musicology. The tour was often billed as the Musicology Live 2004ever, or more commonly, the Musicology Tour. The tour earned $87.4 million and was attended by 1.47 million fans Although the tour promoted Musicology, only half of the tracks from the album were played during the concerts; the title track, "Musicology", "Call My Name" Life "O" the Party, "On the Couch" and "Dear Mr. Man". "A Million Days" was also performed, but only once. The tour featured many of Prince's more famous tracks, such as "Little Red Corvette", "Raspberry Beret", "Kiss", and "Purple Rain". A CD copy of Musicology was included with every concert ticket sold.

== Track listing ==
All tracks written by Prince.

Musicology track listing
No.	Title	Length
1.	"Musicology"	4:26
2.	"Illusion, Coma, Pimp & Circumstance"	4:46
3.	"A Million Days"	3:50
4.	"Life 'o' the Party"	4:29
5.	"Call My Name"	5:15
6.	"Cinnamon Girl"	3:56
7.	"What Do U Want Me 2 Do?"	4:15
8.	"The Marrying Kind"	2:49
9.	"If Eye Was the Man in Ur Life"	3:09
10.	"On the Couch"	3:33
11.	"Dear Mr. Man"	4:14
12.	"Reflection"	3:04

== Personnel ==
- Prince – lead and backing vocals, electric and acoustic guitars, Yamaha Motif 6, Korg Triton, Clavia Nord Lead 2, Fender Rhodes piano, piano, bass guitar, drums, percussion, programming, Linn LM-1
- Candy Dulfer – lead (4) and backing vocals (4, 6), saxophone (4, 8–11), horns (8–10)
- Chance Howard – backing vocals (4–6)
- Stokley – backing vocals (5)
- Kip Blackshire – backing vocals (5)
- Clare Fischer – string arrangement (5)
- Rhonda Smith – backing vocals (6), bass guitar (11)
- John Blackwell – drums (8–11)
- Maceo Parker – saxophone (8–10)
- Greg Boyer – trombone (8–10)
- Ornella Bonaccorsi – Italian speech (7)
- Sheila E. – shaker (11)
- Renato Neto – Fender Rhodes electric piano (11)
- L. Stu Young - Engineer (Metalworks Studios)
- Christopher Crerar - Assistant Engineer (Metalworks Studios)

== Singles ==
- "Musicology" (No. 20 US Bubbling Under, No. 3 US R&B)
- "Cinnamon Girl" (UK)

Promotional singles

- "Call My Name" (No. 75 US)

== Charts ==
=== Weekly charts ===
2004 weekly chart performance for Musicology
Chart (2004)	Peak position
Australian Albums (ARIA)	19
Austrian Albums (Ö3 Austria)	4
Belgian Albums (Ultratop Flanders)	6
Belgian Albums (Ultratop Wallonia)	18
Canadian Albums (Nielsen SoundScan)	11
Canadian R&B Albums (Nielsen SoundScan)	6
Danish Albums (Hitlisten)	2
Dutch Albums (Album Top 100)	3
Finnish Albums (Suomen virallinen lista)	22
French Albums (SNEP)	7
German Albums (Offizielle Top 100)	4
Irish Albums (IRMA)	4
Italian Albums (FIMI)	10
New Zealand Albums (RMNZ)	25
Norwegian Albums (VG-lista)	2
Polish Albums (ZPAV)	18
Scottish Albums (Official Charts)	8
Spanish Albums (AFYVE)	20
Swedish Albums (Sverigetopplistan)	6
Swiss Albums (Schweizer Hitparade)	2
UK Albums (Official Charts)	3
UK R&B Albums (Official Charts)	3
US Billboard 200	3
US Top R&B/Hip-Hop Albums (Billboard)	3

2020 weekly chart performance for Musicology
Chart (2020)	Peak position
Portuguese Albums (AFP)	49

=== Year-end charts ===
2004 year-end chart performance for Musicology
Chart (2004)	Position
Belgian Albums (Ultratop Flanders)	70
Dutch Albums (Album Top 100)	25
Swiss Albums (Schweizer Hitparade)	48
UK Albums (OCC)	192
US Billboard 200	25
US Top R&B/Hip-Hop Albums (Billboard)	28

== Certifications ==
Certifications for Musicology
Region	Certification	Certified units/sales
Canada (Music Canada)	Gold	50,000^{^}
Netherlands (NVPI)	Gold	40,000^{^}
Switzerland (IFPI Switzerland)	Gold	20,000^{^}
United Kingdom (BPI)	Gold	100,000^{^}
United States (RIAA)	2× Platinum	2,000,000^{^}
^{^} Shipments figures based on certification alone.
