= Musicology (song) =

- German CD single

Single by Prince

from the album Musicology
- B-side: "On the Couch" (CD single); "Magnificent" (download)
- Released: April 3, 2004
- Recorded: November 2002
- Studio: Paisley Park, Chanhassen, Minnesota, US
- Genre: Funk
- Length: 4:26 (album version); 4:04 (radio edit)
- Label: NPG
- Songwriter: Prince
- Producer: Prince

Prince singles chronology
| "Controversy (Live in Hawaii)" (2004) | "Musicology" (2004) | "Cinnamon Girl" (2004) |

"Musicology" is a song by Prince, and title track from his 2004 album of the same name. The song is an obvious ode to James Brown's style of funk music popularized in the early 1970s. The song is also reminiscent of Prince's own "The Work, pt. 1", from his 2001 album The Rainbow Children.

The B-side of the single is the Musicology track "On the Couch", a seductive ballad with a gospel flavor. In addition, Prince released a song on his website titled "Magnificent", which was listed as the "virtual B-side" to "Musicology".

In the United States, the song received airplay on Urban Adult Contemporary radio stations. The song had larger success as a video with television airplay, as it was played regularly on MTV, BET, and VH1. Outside the US, the song had considerable success on the pop charts in a number of countries. Specifically, "Musicology" went Top 40 in Argentina, Australia, Italy, Netherlands, New Zealand, Norway, and Switzerland.

The song won the Grammy Award for Best Traditional R&B Performance at the 47th Annual Grammy Awards.

== Charts ==
Chart performance for "Musicology"
| Chart (2004) | Peak position |
|---|---|
| Australia (ARIA) | 29 |
| Australian Urban (ARIA) | 9 |
| Belgium (Ultratip Bubbling Under Flanders) | 4 |
| Belgium (Ultratip Bubbling Under Wallonia) | 16 |
| Greece (IFPI) | 41 |
| Hungary (Dance Top 40) | 39 |
| Italy (FIMI) | 20 |
| Netherlands (Dutch Top 40 Tipparade) | 2 |
| Netherlands (Single Top 100) | 32 |
| New Zealand (Recorded Music NZ) | 32 |
| Norway (VG-lista) | 19 |
| Spain (Promusicae) | 7 |
| Switzerland (Schweizer Hitparade) | 27 |
| US Bubbling Under Hot 100 (Billboard) | 20 |
