= List of Billboard 200 number-one albums of 1990 =

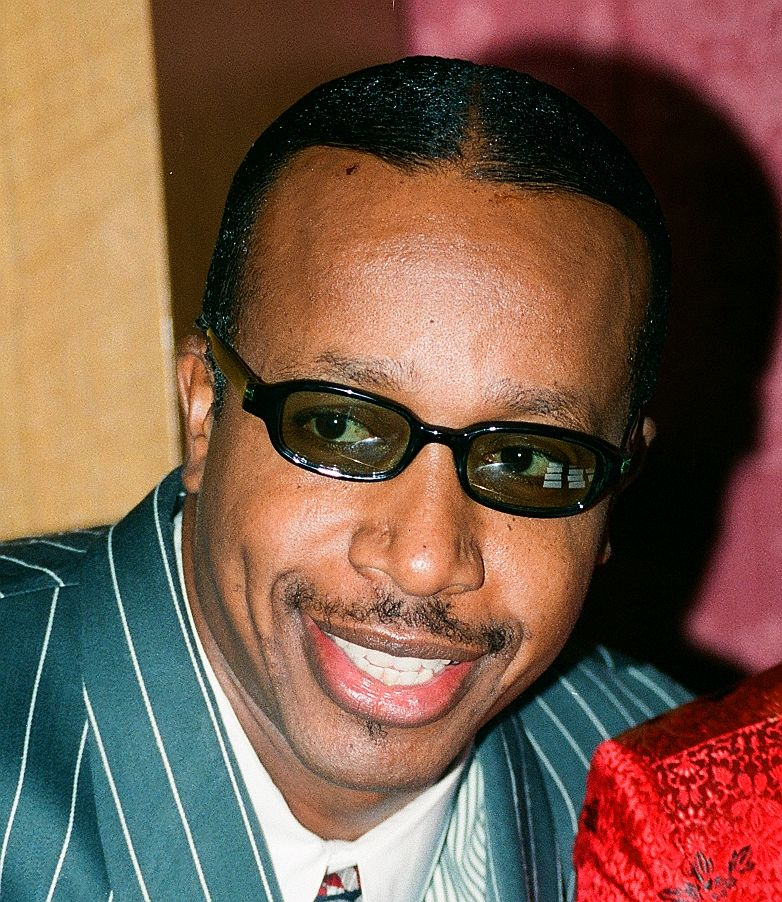
Please Hammer Don't Hurt 'Em by MC Hammer spent 21 weeks at No. 1 in 1990, including 18 consecutive weeks.

The highest-selling albums and EPs in the United States are ranked in the Billboard 200, which is published by Billboard magazine. The data are compiled by Nielsen Soundscan based on each album's weekly physical and digital sales. In 1990, 8 albums occupied the peak position on the chart.

Please Hammer Don't Hurt 'Em, the third and most popular album (and second major-label release) by MC Hammer, had the longest run among the releases that reached peak position in 1990, spending 21 non-consecutive weeks in the top position (18 of these weeks were consecutive). Its popularity was due primarily to the runaway single, "U Can't Touch This". However, it was criticized for its sampling of other artists' songs. "U Can't Touch This" sampled "Super Freak" by Rick James; "Dancin' Machine" sampled the Jackson 5; "Have You Seen Her" is a semi-cover of The Chi-Lites song; "Help the Children" interpolates Marvin Gaye's "Mercy Mercy Me (The Ecology)"; "Pray" and "She's Soft and Wet" sample the Prince hits "When Doves Cry" and "Soft and Wet" respectively.

The album raised rap music to a new level of popularity. It was the first hip-hop album certified diamond by the RIAA for sales of over ten million. It remains one of the genre's all-time best-selling albums. To date, the album has sold over 18 million copies worldwide.

According to Guinness World Records, the album cost just $10,000 to produce.

Janet Jackson's Rhythm Nation 1814 was the best performing and best-selling album of 1990 despite not reaching number-one at any point during the year. The album achieved 4 weeks atop the chart during 1989.

== Chart history ==
Issue date	Album	Artist(s)	Label	Ref.
January 6	...But Seriously	Phil Collins	Atlantic	
January 13	Girl You Know It's True	Milli Vanilli	Arista	
January 20	...But Seriously	Phil Collins	Atlantic	
January 27	...But Seriously	Phil Collins	Atlantic	
February 3	Forever Your Girl	Paula Abdul	Virgin	
February 10	Forever Your Girl	Paula Abdul	Virgin	
February 17	Forever Your Girl	Paula Abdul	Virgin	
February 24	Forever Your Girl	Paula Abdul	Virgin	
March 3	Forever Your Girl	Paula Abdul	Virgin	
March 10	Forever Your Girl	Paula Abdul	Virgin	
March 17	Forever Your Girl	Paula Abdul	Virgin	
March 24	Forever Your Girl	Paula Abdul	Virgin	
March 31	Forever Your Girl	Paula Abdul	Virgin	
April 7	Nick of Time	Bonnie Raitt	Capitol	
April 14	Nick of Time	Bonnie Raitt	Capitol	
April 21	Nick of Time	Bonnie Raitt	Capitol	
April 28	I Do Not Want What I Haven't Got	Sinéad O'Connor	Chrysalis	
May 5	I Do Not Want What I Haven't Got	Sinéad O'Connor	Chrysalis	
May 12	I Do Not Want What I Haven't Got	Sinéad O'Connor	Chrysalis	
May 19	I Do Not Want What I Haven't Got	Sinéad O'Connor	Chrysalis	
May 26	I Do Not Want What I Haven't Got	Sinéad O'Connor	Chrysalis	
June 2	I Do Not Want What I Haven't Got	Sinéad O'Connor	Chrysalis	
June 9	Please Hammer Don't Hurt 'Em	MC Hammer	Capitol	
June 16	Please Hammer Don't Hurt 'Em	MC Hammer	Capitol	
June 23	Please Hammer Don't Hurt 'Em	MC Hammer	Capitol	
June 30	Step by Step	New Kids on the Block	Columbia	
July 7	Please Hammer Don't Hurt 'Em	MC Hammer	Capitol	
July 14	Please Hammer Don't Hurt 'Em	MC Hammer	Capitol	
July 21	Please Hammer Don't Hurt 'Em	MC Hammer	Capitol	
July 28	Please Hammer Don't Hurt 'Em	MC Hammer	Capitol	
August 4	Please Hammer Don't Hurt 'Em	MC Hammer	Capitol	
August 11	Please Hammer Don't Hurt 'Em	MC Hammer	Capitol	
August 18	Please Hammer Don't Hurt 'Em	MC Hammer	Capitol	
August 25	Please Hammer Don't Hurt 'Em	MC Hammer	Capitol	
September 1	Please Hammer Don't Hurt 'Em	MC Hammer	Capitol	
September 8	Please Hammer Don't Hurt 'Em	MC Hammer	Capitol	
September 15	Please Hammer Don't Hurt 'Em	MC Hammer	Capitol	
September 22	Please Hammer Don't Hurt 'Em	MC Hammer	Capitol	
September 29	Please Hammer Don't Hurt 'Em	MC Hammer	Capitol	
October 6	Please Hammer Don't Hurt 'Em	MC Hammer	Capitol	
October 13	Please Hammer Don't Hurt 'Em	MC Hammer	Capitol	
October 20	Please Hammer Don't Hurt 'Em	MC Hammer	Capitol	
October 27	Please Hammer Don't Hurt 'Em	MC Hammer	Capitol	
November 3	Please Hammer Don't Hurt 'Em	MC Hammer	Capitol	
November 10	To the Extreme	Vanilla Ice	SBK	
November 17	To the Extreme	Vanilla Ice	SBK	
November 24	To the Extreme	Vanilla Ice	SBK	
December 1	To the Extreme	Vanilla Ice	SBK	
December 8	To the Extreme	Vanilla Ice	SBK	
December 15	To the Extreme	Vanilla Ice	SBK	
December 22	To the Extreme	Vanilla Ice	SBK	
December 29	To the Extreme	Vanilla Ice	SBK	

== See also ==
- 1990 in music
