= I Wanna Be Your Lover =

- French 7" single

Single by Prince

from the album Prince
- B-side: "My Love Is Forever"/"Sexy Dancer" (US); "Just as Long as We're Together"/"Sexy Dancer" (UK); "Why You Wanna Treat Me So Bad?" (GER)
- Released: August 24, 1979
- Recorded: April–June 1979
- Studio: Alpha Studios, Burbank, California
- Genre: Disco; funk; pop; dance-pop; soul; post-disco
- Length: 2:57 (7" edit); 5:47 (12" / album version)
- Label: Warner Bros.
- Songwriter: Prince
- Producer: Prince

Prince singles chronology
"Just as Long as We're Together" (1978)	"I Wanna Be Your Lover" (1979)	"Why You Wanna Treat Me So Bad?" (1980)

Alternative cover
- US 7-inch vinyl single artwork

Music video
- "I Wanna Be Your Lover" on YouTube

"I Wanna Be Your Lover" is a song by American recording artist Prince. It was released on August 24, 1979, as the lead single from his self-titled second album. The song was Prince's first major hit single in the United States, reaching number 11 on the Billboard Hot 100 on January 26, 1980, holding that position for two weeks, and peaking at number one on the Billboard Hot Soul Singles chart for two weeks.

== Composition ==
"I Wanna Be Your Lover" was written after Warner Bros. requested a follow-up to Prince's debut album For You, which had underperformed commercially. In response, Prince recorded "I Wanna Be Your Lover". Musically, it is a disco, funk, pop, dance-pop, soul, and post-disco. The song is sung exclusively in falsetto, detailing Prince's love for a woman and how he would treat her better than the men she is with, and frustration that she thinks of him as "a child".

The single edit of "I Wanna Be Your Lover" stops after 2:57, but the album version goes off on a jam of keyboards and synthesizers, including a Polymoog, played by Prince. The song is written in the key of A flat minor with Prince's vocal ranges from C3 to D5.

It was later revealed that "I Wanna Be Your Lover" concerned a crush Prince had at the time on pianist and singer Patrice Rushen. Prince also wrote the song "I Feel for You" about Rushen which was the eighth song off the same album and would later famously be covered by Chaka Khan in 1984.

== Promotion ==
Prince promoted "I Wanna Be Your Lover" by lip-syncing it with his band on The Midnight Special and American Bandstand, where he gave host Dick Clark an awkward interview, answering his questions with one-word answers. Prince claimed to be 19 but was 21 at the time. Clark later said, "That was one of the most difficult interviews I've ever conducted, and I've done 10,000 musician interviews."

"I Wanna Be Your Lover" was also Prince's debut single released in the UK; it was not a major hit, reaching No. 41 on the UK Singles Chart and when Prince tried to promote it with shows in London, he was forced to cancel due to poor attendance. Additionally, the song reached No. 2 on the Billboard Hot Dance Club Play chart and No. 2 in New Zealand.

Prince included a sample of the song in the opening of his 1992 hit single "My Name Is Prince".

== Music video ==
There are two versions of the music video of "I Wanna Be Your Lover". The main version has Prince in an unbuttoned leopard shirt and jeans singing alone in a black background with only a mic, notably with straight-wavy hair and a departure from his afro from a year before. Various shots show him playing the instruments by himself.

The other version, which has not aired and was not featured on The Hits Collection compilation shows Prince and his band members performing the song in a painted room. The video was pulled due to skimpy clothing and a sexually suggestive theme (Prince was clad in blue stockings and a tan shirt).

== Track listings ==
7" single

- A. "I Wanna Be Your Lover" (edit) – 2:57
- B. "My Love Is Forever" – 4:08

7" single (UK)

- A. "I Wanna Be Your Lover" (edit) – 2:57
- B. "Just as Long as We're Together" (edit) – 3:25

7" single (DEU)

- A. "I Wanna Be Your Lover" (edit) – 2:57
- B. "Why You Wanna Treat Me So Bad?" – 3:49

12" single (UK)

- A. "I Wanna Be Your Lover" – 5:47
- B. "Just as Long as We're Together" – 6:24

12" promo

- A. "I Wanna Be Your Lover" (edit) – 2:57
- B. "I Wanna Be Your Lover" – 5:57

== Personnel ==
Information taken from Benoît Clerc and Guitarcloud.

- Prince – lead and backing vocals, electric and acoustic guitars, clavinet, Yamaha CP-70 electric grand piano, Oberheim Four Voice, Polymoog, Minimoog, ARP String Ensemble, bass guitar, drums

== Charts ==
=== Weekly charts ===
Weekly chart performance for "I Wanna Be Your Lover"
Chart (1979–1980)	Peak position
New Zealand (Recorded Music NZ)	3
UK Singles (Official Charts)	41
US Billboard Hot 100	11
US Dance Club Songs (Billboard)	2
US Hot Soul Singles (Billboard)	1

Chart (2016)	Peak position
France (SNEP)	25

=== Year-end charts ===
Year-end chart performance for "I Wanna Be Your Lover"
Chart (1980)	Position
US Billboard Hot 100	95

== Certifications ==
Region	Certification	Certified units/sales
New Zealand (RMNZ)	Gold	15,000^{‡}
United Kingdom (BPI)	Silver	200,000^{‡}
United States (RIAA)	Gold	1,000,000^{^}
^{^} Shipments figures based on certification alone.^{‡} Sales+streaming figures based on certification alone.

== See also ==
- List of number-one R&B singles of 1979 (U.S.)
