= Please Hammer Don't Hurt 'Em =

Studio album by MC Hammer
- Released: February 12, 1990
- Recorded: 1988–1989
- Genres: Hip-hop; pop rap
- Length: 59:04
- Labels: Capitol; EMI
- Producers: MC Hammer; Big Louis Burrell; Felton Pilate; James Earley

MC Hammer chronology
Let's Get It Started (1988)	Please Hammer Don't Hurt 'Em (1990)	Too Legit to Quit (1991)

Singles from Please Hammer Don't Hurt 'Em
- 1. "Help the Children" Released: January 10, 1990; 2. "Dancin' Machine" Released: February 1990; 3. "U Can't Touch This" Released: April 1990; 4. "Have You Seen Her" Released: June 1990; 5. "Pray" Released: August 21, 1990; 6. "Here Comes the Hammer" Released: December 1990

Please Hammer Don't Hurt 'Em is the third studio album by American rapper MC Hammer, released on February 12, 1990 by Capitol Records and EMI Records. Produced, recorded and mixed by Felton Pilate and James Earley, the album was made on a small budget of around $10,000 and recorded on a modified tour bus between May 1988 and November 1989.

Please Hammer Don't Hurt 'Em received lukewarm reviews from critics, yet received five nominations at the 1991 Grammy Awards, including Album of the Year, becoming the first hip hop record to be nominated in this category, as well as winning five awards at the 1991 American Music Awards. The album is considered Hammer's mainstream breakthrough and a commercial juggernaut. It peaked at number one for twenty-one weeks on the US Billboard 200, becoming the first rap recording from a solo artist to top the pop chart, and was one of the best-selling albums of 1990. It was the first hip-hop album to be certified diamond in the US, was certified platinum in several countries, and was one of the best-selling hip-hop albums worldwide, selling more than 18 million units to date.

Six official singles were released to promote the album, including the smash hit "U Can't Touch This" which reached the top 10 at the Billboard Hot 100 and peaked at number one in Australia, Netherlands, New Zealand and Sweden, and number 3 on the UK Singles Chart. Following the album's success, Hammer embarked on the Please Hammer Don't Hurt 'Em World Tour, which stretched from 1990 to 1991 with 144 dates, grossing over $32 million.

== Background ==
Hammer's previous album, Let's Get It Started, had sold over 1.5 million units in the United States by the end of 1989. Not satisfied with the platinum success, Hammer chose to deviate from the standard rap format in his next album. Though some purists criticized him for being more of a dancer than a rapper, Hammer defended his style: "People were ready for something different from the traditional rap style. The fact that the record has reached this level indicates the genre is growing."

While on tour in the summer of 1988, Hammer started to record his third studio album on a modified tour bus. After spending part of his advance from Capitol Records on $50,000 worth of equipment for the back of the tour bus, he used his free time on the road to record his next album. It was produced, recorded and mixed by Felton Pilate and James Earley on the bus in 1989. According to Guinness World Records, the album cost just $10,000 to produce, roughly the same budget as Hammer's independent debut. Capitol marketed the album by sending free cassette singles and a personalized letter to 100,000 children, most of whom were Black or Hispanic. The letter, signed by Hammer, asked young people to phone MTV and request his video.

== Album overview and promotion ==
The album was supported by the single "U Can't Touch This"; follow-up singles included "Have You Seen Her" (a cover of the Chi-Lites) and "Pray" (a beat sampled from Prince's "When Doves Cry" and Faith No More's "We Care a Lot"). The album was notable for sampling other high-profile artists: "Dancin' Machine" sampled The Jackson 5, "Help the Children" (also the name of an outreach foundation Hammer started) interpolates Marvin Gaye's "Mercy Mercy Me (The Ecology)", and "She's Soft and Wet" sampled Prince's "Soft and Wet".

Following the album's success, Hammer toured extensively in Europe, including a sold-out concert at the National Exhibition Centre in Birmingham. With the sponsorship of PepsiCo International, Pepsi CEO Christopher A. Sinclair went on tour with him in 1991.

== Critical reception ==
Professional ratings
Review scores
Source	Rating
AllMusic	3/5 stars
Entertainment Weekly	A−
Los Angeles Times	1.5/5 stars
RapReviews	5/10
Rolling Stone	2/5 stars
The Rolling Stone Album Guide	3/5 stars
The Village Voice	C+

Hammer experienced critical backlash over the repetitive nature of his lyrics, his clean-cut image and his perceived over-reliance on hooks from other artists for the basis of his singles. Please Hammer Don't Hurt 'Em was also criticized for its sampling of songs by other musicians. Hammer was dissed in music videos by The D.O.C. and Ice Cube. Oakland hip-hop group Digital Underground mocked him in the CD insert of their Sex Packets album by placing his picture with the other members and referring to him as an unknown derelict. He was also mentioned in the song "The Humpty Dance", with Shock G claiming: "People say 'Ya look like MC Hammer on crack, Humpty!'" On LL Cool J's track "To da Break of Dawn", Hammer is referenced as an "amateur, swinging a Hammer from a body bag [his pants]". Additional lyrics included "my old gym teacher ain't supposed to rap." He later referenced Hammer in "I Shot Ya (remix)", a track on his 1995 album Mr. Smith. However, LL Cool J would later compliment and commend Hammer's talents on VH1's 100 Greatest Songs of Hip Hop, which aired in 2008.

The album received five nominations at the 1991 Grammy Awards, including Album of the Year, becoming the first hip hop record nominated in this category. Please Hammer Don't Hurt 'Em won Best Rap Solo Performance and Best R&B Song for "U Can't Touch This" and Best Music Video, Long Form for the film accompanying the album. The album also won five awards at the 1991 American Music Awards, including Favorite Soul/R&B Album, Favorite Rap/Hip-Hop Album and Favorite Pop/Rock Album.

== Commercial reception ==
Released on February 12, 1990, Please Hammer Don't Hurt 'Em reached the number one position on the US Billboard 200 in the week ending June 9, 1990, becoming the first rap album from a solo artist to reach the top spot on the pop charts. It remained a total of 21 weeks at the top of US Billboard 200, the longest run by a male black artist since Michael Jackson's Thriller. Likewise, the album saw longevity on the Top R&B/Hip-Hop Albums chart, peaking at No. 1 and staying atop the chart for twenty-nine weeks. Most of the singles released from the album proved to be successful on radio and television, with "U Can't Touch This", "Pray", "Have You Seen Her", "Here Comes the Hammer" and UK exclusive "Yo!! Sweetness" all charting. Despite heavy airplay and a No. 27 chart debut, "U Can't Touch This" peaked at No. 8 on the US Billboard Hot 100 chart because it was released only as a twelve-inch vinyl single with no other format available.

By August, the album was selling over 100,000 copies a day. In fewer than six months, it sold more than four million copies, making it the best-selling rap album at the time, beating Beastie Boys' Licensed to Ill. By January 1991, the album reached 8 million units sold, becoming the first album to do so in one calendar year since Prince's Purple Rain in 1984. By May 1991, the album was certified diamond with over ten million sales in the US. It was the top-selling album of 1990 in the United States, and is one of the best-selling hip hop albums of all time.

In Canada, the album was the sixth best-selling album of 1990, and the single "U Can't Touch This" was the sixth best-selling single of that year. Eventually, the album was certified 8× platinum for selling over 800,000 units in the country, and won International Album of the Year at the 1991 Juno Awards. The album was also certified triple platinum in New Zealand. In May 1991, Hammer received an award for sales of more than 1 million units of the album in EMI Music Worldwide's international territories of Japan, SE Asia, Australasia, Africa and Latin America. As of July 1991, it had sold 17 million copies worldwide.

== Lawsuits ==
Rick James sued Hammer for copyright infringement on the song "U Can't Touch This", but the suit was settled out of court when Hammer agreed to credit James as co-composer, allowing him to earn royalties. Hammer was also sued by a former producer, Felton Pilate, and by several of his former backers. Additionally, he faced charges that performance troupe members endured an abusive, militaristic atmosphere.

In 1992, Hammer admitted in depositions and court documents to getting the idea for the song "Here Comes the Hammer" from a Texas-based Christian recording artist named Kevin Abdullah. Abdullah had filed a US$16 million lawsuit against Hammer for copyright infringement for his song entitled "Oh-Oh, You Got the Shing". Hammer settled with Abdullah for $250,000 in 1995.

== Track listing ==
All tracks are written by Stanley Burrell, except where noted.

No.	Title	Writer(s)	Length
1.	"Here Comes the Hammer (Note: Samples James Brown's "Super Bad".)"		4:32
2.	"U Can't Touch This (Note: Samples Rick James' "Super Freak".)"	Burrell; Rick James; Alonzo Miller	4:17
3.	"Have You Seen Her (Note: The Chi-Lites cover.)"	Burrell; Barbara Acklin; Eugene Record	4:42
4.	"Yo!! Sweetness (Note: Samples James Brown's "Give It to Me Baby" and Barry White's "Your Sweetness Is My Weakness". Not included in vinyl release.)"		4:36
5.	"Help the Children (Note: Incorporates Marvin Gaye's "Mercy Mercy Me (The Ecology)". Vinyl release has track swapped ahead of "On Your Face".)"	Burrell; Marvin Gaye	5:17
6.	"On Your Face (Note: Earth, Wind & Fire cover.)"	Charles Stepney; Maurice White; Philip Bailey	4:32
7.	"Dancin' Machine (Note: The Jackson 5 cover.)"	Hal Davis; Don Fletcher; Dean Parks	2:55
8.	"Pray (Note: Samples Prince's "When Doves Cry" and Faith No More's "We Care a Lot")"	Burrell; Prince	5:13
9.	"Crime Story"		5:09
10.	"She's Soft and Wet (Note: Samples Prince's "Soft and Wet".)"	Burrell; Prince; Chris Moon	3:25
11.	"Black Is Black (Note: Samples James Brown'a Say It Loud – I'm Black and I'm Proud.)"		4:31
12.	"Let's Go Deeper (Note: Not included in vinyl release.)"		5:16
13.	"Work This (Note: Samples Prince's "Let's Work". Not included in vinyl release.)"		5:03
Total length:			59:36

== Charts ==
=== Weekly charts ===
Chart (1990)	Peak position
Australian Albums (ARIA)	5
Austrian Albums (Ö3 Austria)	15
Belgian Albums (BEA)	6
Canadian Albums (RPM)	1
Dutch Albums (Album Top 100)	15
Finnish Albums (Suomen virallinen lista)	24
French Albums (SNEP)	23
German Albums (Offizielle Top 100)	14
Greek Album Charts (Music&Media)	10
Hungarian Albums (MAHASZ)	16
Irish Albums (IRMA)	8
Japanese Albums (Oricon)	4
New Zealand Albums (RMNZ)	2
Norwegian Albums (VG-lista)	14
Spanish Albums (AFE)	14
Swedish Albums (Sverigetopplistan)	17
Swiss Albums (Schweizer Hitparade)	11
UK Albums (OCC)	8
US Billboard 200	1
US Top R&B/Hip-Hop Albums (Billboard)	1
Zimbabwean Albums (ZIMA)	1

=== Year-end charts ===
Chart (1990)	Position
Australian Albums (ARIA)	49
Canada Top Albums/CDs (RPM)	3
Dutch Albums (Album Top 100)	71
German Albums (Offizielle Top 100)	93
New Zealand Albums (RMNZ)	6
US Billboard 200	5
US Top R&B/Hip-Hop Albums (Billboard)	3

Chart (1991)	Position
Canada Top Albums/CDs (RPM)	23
German Albums (Offizielle Top 100)	37
New Zealand Albums (RMNZ)	37
US Billboard 200	7
US Top R&B/Hip-Hop Albums (Billboard)	15

=== Decade-end charts ===
Chart (1990–99)	Position
US Billboard 200	9

== Certifications ==
Region	Certification	Certified units/sales
Australia (ARIA)	Platinum	70,000^{^}
Austria (IFPI Austria)	Gold	25,000^{*}
Canada (Music Canada)	8× Platinum	800,000^{^}
France (SNEP)	Gold	100,000^{*}
Germany (BVMI)	Gold	250,000^{^}
Japan (RIAJ)	2× Platinum	400,000^{^}
Netherlands (NVPI)	Gold	50,000^{^}
New Zealand (RMNZ)	Platinum	15,000^{^}
Spain (Promusicae)	Platinum	100,000^{^}
Switzerland (IFPI Switzerland)	Gold	25,000^{^}
United Kingdom (BPI)	2× Platinum	600,000^{^}
United States (RIAA)	Diamond	10,100,000
United States (RIAA) Video longform	2× Platinum	200,000^{^}
^{*} Sales figures based on certification alone.^{^} Shipments figures based on certification alone.

== Film ==
The Please Hammer Don't Hurt 'Em album was accompanied by a direct-to-video film titled Please Hammer Don't Hurt 'Em: The Movie. It stars MC Hammer as a rapper who returns to his old neighborhood and defeats an illegal drug trade dealer who is using kids to traffic his product. Hammer plays the additional role of preacher Reverend Pressure. The film costarred Juice Sneed, Keyon White, Joe Mack and Davina H'Ollier.

The movie won Hammer, director Rupert Wainwright and producer John Oetjen a Grammy for Best Music Video, Long Form at the 33rd Grammy Awards. In addition to Hammer, music talent included Ho Frat Hoo! (1991 MTV Video Music Awards Best Choreography in a Video winner for "Pray" along with Hammer), Torture, Special Generation and One Cause One Effect.

Additional releases included The Making of Please Hammer Don't Hurt 'Em, Hammer Time and Here Comes the Hammer. All projects were Capitol Records Productions.

== See also ==
- List of best-selling albums in the United States
- List of number-one albums of 1990 (U.S.)
- List of number-one R&B albums of 1990 (U.S.)
