= Prince (album) =

1979 studio album by Prince

Studio album by Prince
- Released: October 19, 1979
- Recorded: April–June 1979
- Studios: Alpha, Burbank, California. Mixed at Hollywood Sound Recorders, Hollywood, California.
- Genres: R&B; funk; pop; rock; disco; soul
- Length: 40:52
- Label: Warner Bros.
- Producer: Prince

Prince chronology
For You (1978)	Prince (1979)	Dirty Mind (1980)

Singles from Prince
- 1. "I Wanna Be Your Lover" Released: August 24, 1979; 2. "Why You Wanna Treat Me So Bad?" Released: January 23, 1980; 3. "Still Waiting" Released: March 25, 1980; 4. "Sexy Dancer" Released: April 1980 (non-US single)

Prince is the second studio album by the American musician Prince. It was released on October 19, 1979, by Warner Bros. Records. The album was written, arranged, composed, produced, and performed by Prince. Prince was regarded as more diverse than For You (1978), and performed better critically and commercially. Reviewing in Christgau's Record Guide: Rock Albums of the Seventies (1981), Robert Christgau wrote: "This boy is going to be a big star, and he deserves it".

Prince peaked at 22 on the Billboard 200 and number three on the Billboard R&B Chart. The album contained three Billboard Hot Black Singles hits: "Why You Wanna Treat Me So Bad?", "Sexy Dancer" and "I Wanna Be Your Lover". "I Wanna Be Your Lover" was Prince's first hit single on the Billboard Hot 100, peaking at number eleven while also topping the Billboard Hot Black Singles. Prince was certified Platinum by the Recording Industry Association of America (RIAA) four months after its release.

== Background ==
The album was written, arranged, composed, produced, and performed by Prince. On the album credits, Prince thanks his bassist André Cymone and drummer Bobby Z. as "heaven-sent helpers".

Prince recorded the album in five weeks, after Warner Bros. asked for a follow-up to his 1978 debut, For You. Prince had used twice his initial recording advance on that album, and it had failed to generate a pop hit (although "Soft and Wet" became a No. 12 R&B hit). Displeased at his lack of success, Prince quickly recorded the follow-up.

=== 2019 ===
On October 19, 2019, Prince's estate released an acoustic demo version of "I Feel for You" as a single to celebrate the 40th anniversary of the Prince album release.

== Critical reception ==
Professional ratings
Review scores
Source	Rating
AllMusic	3/5 stars
Blender	3/5 stars
Christgau's Record Guide	B+
Entertainment Weekly	B−
The Guardian	4/5 stars
MusicHound Rock	4/5 stars
Q	3/5 stars
Rolling Stone	(favorable)
The Rolling Stone Album Guide	4/5 stars
Smash Hits	5/10

Overall, the album was much more diverse and well-received than For You, critically and commercially, selling three million copies. It is notable for containing standard R&B ballads performed by Prince, before he would go on to establish himself with sexual romps on later albums. The album was certified platinum and contained three R&B/dance hits: "Why You Wanna Treat Me So Bad?", "Sexy Dancer" and "I Wanna Be Your Lover." "I Wanna Be Your Lover" sold over one million copies and received a gold disc, rushing to No. 11 on the Billboard Hot 100 (becoming Prince's first hit single) and topped the R&B charts. In addition, it peaked at No. 41 in the United Kingdom (his first entry in the country) and reached number 2 on the Billboard Dance/Disco Singles chart. Prince performed both "I Wanna Be Your Lover" and "Why You Wanna Treat Me So Bad?" on American Bandstand on 26 January 1980. Overall, the success of this album geared Prince towards his next album, Dirty Mind, which would be called a complete departure from his earlier sound.

Reviewing in Christgau's Record Guide: Rock Albums of the Seventies (1981), Robert Christgau wrote: "This boy is going to be a big star, and he deserves it—he's got a great line. 'I want to come inside you' is good enough, but (in a different song) the simple 'I'm physically attracted to you' sets new standards of 'naive,' winning candor. The vulnerable teen-macho falsetto idea is pretty good too. But he does leave something to be desired in the depth-of-feeling department—you know, soul."

== Track listing ==
All tracks are written by Prince.

Side one
No.	Title	Length
1.	"I Wanna Be Your Lover"	5:49
2.	"Why You Wanna Treat Me So Bad?"	3:49
3.	"Sexy Dancer"	4:18
4.	"When We're Dancing Close and Slow"	5:23
Total length:		19:19

Side two
No.	Title	Length
5.	"With You"	4:00
6.	"Bambi"	4:22
7.	"Still Waiting"	4:12
8.	"I Feel for You"	3:24
9.	"It's Gonna Be Lonely"	5:27
Total length:		21:25 40:44

== Singles ==
- "I Wanna Be Your Lover" b/w "My Love Is Forever" (US number 11, US R&B number 1, US Dance number 2, UK number 41)
- "Why You Wanna Treat Me So Bad?" b/w "Baby" (US R&B number 13)
- "Still Waiting" b/w "Bambi" (US R&B number 65)
- "Sexy Dancer" b/w "Bambi"/"Why You Wanna Treat Me So Bad?" (UK and Japan Only US Dance number 2)

== Personnel ==
- Prince – lead and backing vocals, electric and acoustic guitars, Oberheim Four Voice, Polymoog, Minimoog, ARP String Ensemble, clavinet, Yamaha CP-70 electric grand piano, piano, Fender Rhodes piano, bass guitar, drums, Pollard Syndrums, percussion, producer, arranger, remixer
- André Cymone – backing vocals (2) (uncredited)

Technical

- Gary Brandt – engineer
- Mark Ettel – assistant engineer
- Bob Mockler – remixer
- Bernie Grundman – mastering (A&M)
- Lynn Barron – album design (RIA Images)
- George Chacon – album design (RIA Images)
- Jurgen Reisch – photography (front cover)
- Chris Callis – photography (back cover)
- Terry Taylor – calligraphy

== Charts ==
=== Weekly charts ===
1979 weekly chart performance for Prince
Chart (1979)	Peak position
US Billboard 200	22
US Top R&B/Hip-Hop Albums (Billboard)	3

2016 weekly chart performance for Prince
Chart (2016)	Peak position
French Albums (SNEP)	190
Swiss Albums (Schweizer Hitparade)	92
US Billboard 200	52

=== Year-end charts ===
Year-end chart performance for Prince
Chart (1980)	Position
US Billboard 200	65
US Top R&B/Hip-Hop Albums (Billboard)	9

== Certifications ==
Certifications for Prince
Region	Certification	Certified units/sales
United Kingdom (BPI)	Silver	60,000^{^}
United States (RIAA)	Platinum	1,000,000^{^}
Summaries
Worldwide	—	2,080,000
^{^} Shipments figures based on certification alone.
