= Pray (MC Hammer song) =

1990 single by MC Hammer

Single by MC Hammer

from the album Please Hammer, Don't Hurt 'Em
- B-side: "U Can't Touch This" (LP version)
- Released: August 21, 1990
- Length: 5:11
- Label: Capitol
- Songwriters: Prince, MC Hammer
- Producer: MC Hammer

MC Hammer singles chronology
"Have You Seen Her" (1990)	"Pray" (1990)	"Here Comes the Hammer" (1990)

"Pray" is a song from American rapper and dancer MC Hammer's third album, Please Hammer Don't Hurt 'Em (1990). Produced by Hammer, the song heavily samples Prince's 1984 song "When Doves Cry", the first of just a few times that Prince allowed samples of his compositions. The track also interpolates Faith No More's "We Care a Lot". The word "pray" is mentioned 147 times during the song, setting the record for the number of times a song title is repeated in an American Top 40 hit.

Capitol Records released "Pray" as the third single from Please Hammer Don't Hurt 'Em in August 1990. It became MC Hammer's biggest hit on the US Billboard Hot 100, where it peaked at number two. The track also became a top-40 hit in multiple countries, and helped make Please Hammer Don't Hurt 'Em the number-one album of the year. The song was certified gold in the US on November 26, 1990 (with sales over 500,000 copies). The song, accompanied with music videos, has appeared on several compilation albums, including Greatest Hits, Back 2 Back Hits, and The Hits. It also appeared in Please Hammer Don't Hurt 'Em: The Movie (1990).

== Track listing ==
US CD single

1. "Pray" (Slam the Hammer mix) – 8:01
2. "Pray" (Slam the Hammer piano dub) – 5:26
3. "Pray" (Jam the Hammer mix) – 5:00
4. "Pray" (Hit 'Em Hard mix) – 5:25
5. "Pray" (Nail 'Em Down chant) – 4:56
6. "U Can't Touch This" (LP version) – 4:15

== Charts ==
=== Weekly charts ===
Chart (1990–1991)	Peak position
Australia (ARIA)	7
Austria (Ö3 Austria Top 40)	13
Belgium (Ultratop 50 Flanders)	4
Canada Top Singles (RPM)	14
Canada Dance/Urban (RPM)	3
Europe (Eurochart Hot 100)	5
Finland (Suomen virallinen lista)	7
Germany (GfK)	4
Ireland (IRMA)	13
Luxembourg (Radio Luxembourg)	9
Netherlands (Dutch Top 40)	3
Netherlands (Single Top 100)	3
New Zealand (Recorded Music NZ)	2
Norway (VG-lista)	5
Sweden (Sverigetopplistan)	18
Switzerland (Schweizer Hitparade)	10
UK Singles (Official Charts)	8
US Billboard Hot 100	2
US 12-inch Singles Sales (Billboard)	27
US Dance Club Play (Billboard)	3
US Hot R&B Singles (Billboard)	4
US Hot Rap Singles (Billboard)	7
US Cash Box Top 100	3

=== Year-end charts ===
Chart (1990)	Position
Canada Dance/Urban (RPM)	27

Chart (1991)	Position
Australia (ARIA)	56
Belgium (Ultratop 50 Flanders)	75
Europe (Eurochart Hot 100)	59
Europe (European Hit Radio)	86
Germany (Media Control)	55
US Dance Club Play (Billboard)	39

== Certifications ==
Region	Certification	Certified units/sales
Australia (ARIA)	Gold	35,000^{^}
France	—	25,000
United States (RIAA)	Gold	500,000^{^}
^{^} Shipments figures based on certification alone.

== Release history ==
Region	Date	Format(s)	Label(s)	Ref.
United States	August 21, 1990	12-inch vinyl; CD; cassette	Capitol	
Australia	November 26, 1990	Cassette	Capitol	
United Kingdom	November 26, 1990	7-inch vinyl; 12-inch vinyl; CD; cassette	Capitol	
Japan	November 28, 1990	Mini-CD	Capitol	
Australia	December 17, 1990	12-inch vinyl	Capitol	
