= Still Waiting (Prince song) =

- US 7" single

Single by Prince

from the album Prince
- B-side: "Bambi"
- Released: March 25, 1980
- Recorded: April 23, 1979 (tracking), May 25, 1979 (overdubbing and mixing)
- Studio: Alpha Studios, Burbank, California (tracking), Hollywood Sound Recorders, Hollywood, California (overdubbing and mixing)
- Genre: R&B
- Length: 3:48 (7" edit); 4:24 (album version)
- Label: Warner Bros.
- Songwriter: Prince
- Producer: Prince

Prince singles chronology
"Why You Wanna Treat Me So Bad?" (1980)	"Still Waiting" (1980)	"Sexy Dancer" (1980)

"Bambi"
- Belgian "Bambi" 7" single

"Still Waiting" was the third US single from Prince's second album, Prince. It was Prince's first ballad to be released as a single and was mildly popular on the R&B chart, reaching number 65. The ballad speaks from the perspective of a young man who has not yet found love but yearns for it. The track is mainly piano, acoustic guitar and synth-based and was often played live with extended instrumental solos and audience teasing. The song is a more traditional R&B ballad, before Prince established himself with trademark sexual romps like "Do Me, Baby" and "International Lover".

The song was remade by Rainy Davis in 1987 and appeared on her album Sweetheart. Her version was also released as a single and charted higher than Prince's version on the R&B chart, reaching number 41.

British female duo Dorothy covered the song in 1988, peaking at number 81 on the UK Singles Chart.

== "Bambi" ==
The B-side of the song was the album track rocker, "Bambi". In Belgium, "Bambi" was released as a single with "Still Waiting" as the B-side.

== Personnel ==
Information taken from Benoît Clerc and Guitarcloud.

- Prince – lead and backing vocals, piano, Minimoog, acoustic guitar, bass guitar, drums
