= Why You Wanna Treat Me So Bad? =

Single by Prince

from the album Prince
- B-side: "Baby" (US); "Bambi" (NZ)
- Released: January 23, 1980
- Recorded: May 9, 1979 (tracking), May 25, 1979 (overdubbing and mixing)
- Studio: Alpha Studios, Burbank, California (tracking), Hollywood Sound Recorders, Hollywood, California (overdubbing and mixing)
- Genre: Funk rock; R&B
- Length: 3:49
- Label: Warner Bros.
- Songwriter: Prince
- Producer: Prince

Prince singles chronology
"I Wanna Be Your Lover" (1979)	"Why You Wanna Treat Me So Bad?" (1980)	"Still Waiting" (1980)

"Why You Wanna Treat Me So Bad?" is the US follow-up single to Prince's first big hit, "I Wanna Be Your Lover". It is also Prince's first rock and roll-inspired single release. It did not make the Billboard Hot 100 charts at all (or the Bubbling Under charts), although it did reach #13 on the R&B Singles charts. The lyrics explore a relationship with a cruel lover. The song prominently features guitar and bass, with the keyboard featured in a less prominent role. A highlight of the song is a soaring guitar solo at the end, played by Prince.

The song was played live on Prince's first three tours, always being the second number. The extended lyrics on the live version continue the main theme, although, later on the Dirty Mind tour, these were replaced by screaming "bitch!" and following this with a blazing guitar solo. The B-side of the song was "Baby" (from For You) in the US and "Bambi" in New Zealand.

In 1987, the song was covered by American actress turned singer Tuesday Knight's self-titled debut album.

In September 2009, Prince released a recording of a live performance of the song at Paisley Park Studios on the Internet.

== Personnel ==
Information taken from Benoît Clerc and Guitarcloud.

- Prince – lead and backing vocals, electric guitars, clavinet, Yamaha CP-70 electric grand piano, Oberheim Four Voice, ARP String Ensemble, bass guitar, drums
- André Cymone – backing vocals

== Charts ==
Chart performance for "Why You Wanna Treat Me So Bad?"
Chart (1980)	Peak position
US Billboard Hot R&B Singles	13
