= Sexy Dancer =

- Japanese 7" single

Single by Prince

from the album Prince
- B-side: "Bambi" (UK); "Why You Wanna Treat Me So Bad?" (Japan)
- Released: April 1980 (UK); May 1980 (Japan)
- Recorded: April 17, 1979 (tracking), May 29, 1979 (mixing and overdubbing)
- Studio: Alpha Studios, Burbank, California (tracking), Hollywood Sound Recorders, Hollywood, California (mixing and overdubbing)
- Genre: Disco
- Length: 4:18 (7" / album); 8:50 (12" version)
- Label: Warner Bros.
- Songwriter: Prince
- Producer: Prince

Prince singles chronology
"Still Waiting" (1980)	"Sexy Dancer" (1980)	"Uptown" (1980)

"Sexy Dancer" is a song by Prince, released in the UK as the second single from his self-titled second album. It was the first Prince single released outside the United States that was not released as a single stateside. The disco number has few lyrics but contains prominent bass guitar, grunts and screams. It also has elements of rock and R&B.

The 12" single was Prince's first non-album extended version to be released and is rare today due to its limited release. It includes extended bass and guitar solos, as well as more repeats of the refrain.

"Sexy Dancer" was a popular number performed live, often giving other band members the opportunity to perform instrumental solos. The song has been modified over the years during live performances, often segueing into or out of other tracks, most recently during Prince's 2007, Earth Tour, where the music to the song is accompanied by completely different lyrics, including parts of the disco classic "Le Freak". The B-side of the track was the album track "Bambi" in the UK and "Why You Wanna Treat Me So Bad?" in Japan.

In the premiere episode of the first season of The Golden Bachelor, contestant Leslie Fhima claims that "Sexy Dancer" was written about her after a fling with Prince.

== Personnel ==
Information taken from Benoît Clerc and Guitarcloud.

- Prince – lead and backing vocals, electric guitars, clavinet, Yamaha CP-70 electric grand piano, Polymoog, ARP String Ensemble, bass guitar, drums, Pollard Syndrums, handclaps
