= St. Louis Arena =

Indoor arena in St. Louis, Missouri (1929–1999)

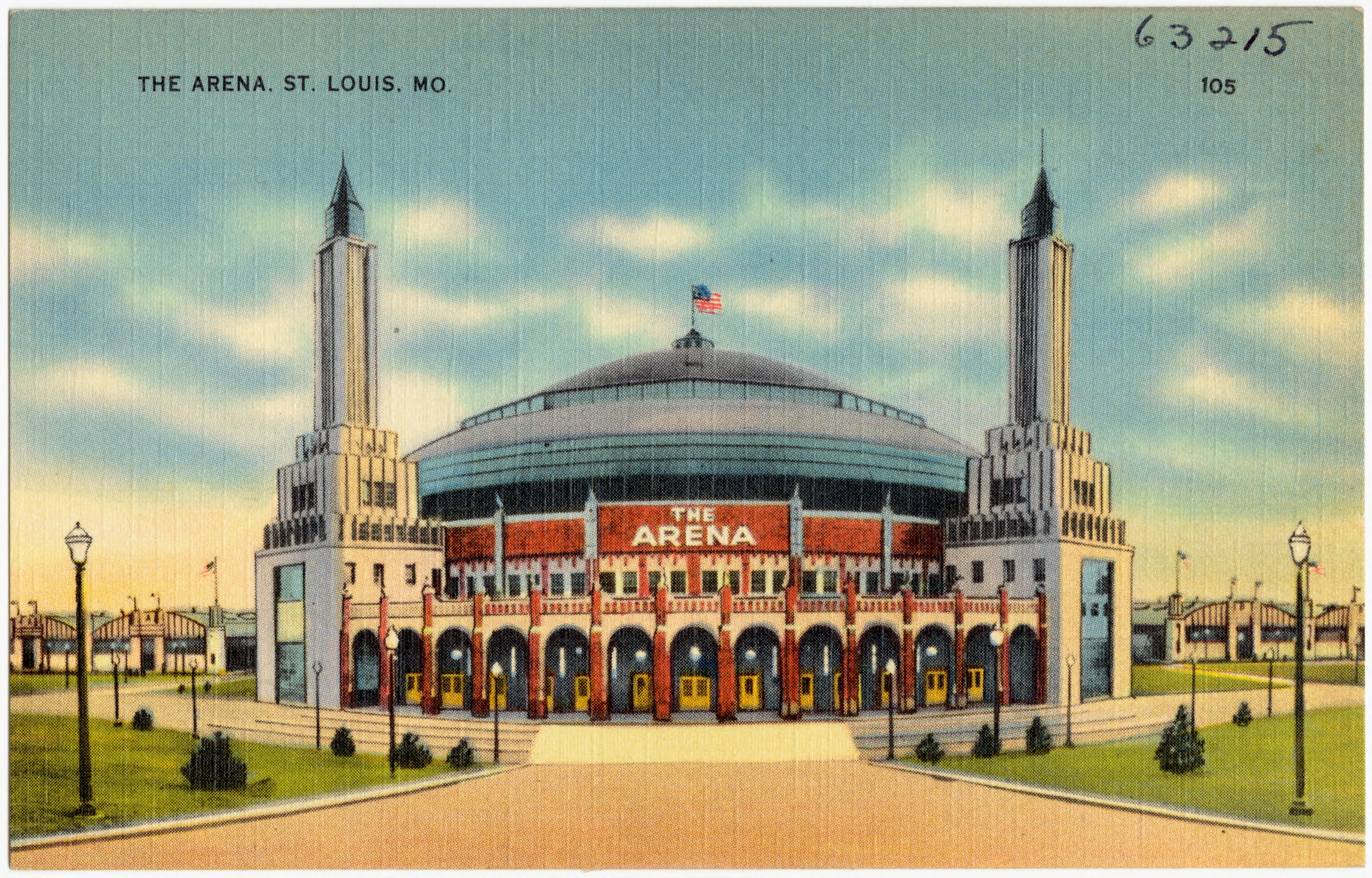
- Interactive map of St. Louis Arena
- Former names: Checkerdome (1977–1983)
- Address: 5700 Oakland Avenue
- Location: St. Louis, Missouri, US
- Coordinates: 38°37′45″N 90°16′58″W
- Owner: City of St. Louis
- Operator: City of St. Louis
- Capacity: Ice hockey: 14,200 (1929–1968); 14,500 (1968–1969); 15,500 (1969–1970); 17,776 (1970–1971); 17,821 (1971–1972); 18,005 (1972–1974); 18,008 (1974–1975); 18,006 (1975–1978); 17,968 (1978–1985); 17,640 (1985–1988); 17,188 (1988–1994)

Construction
- Groundbreaking: 1927
- Opened: September 23, 1929
- Closed: May 23, 1994
- Demolished: February 27, 1999
- Cost: US$1.5 million
- Architects: Gustel R. Kiewitt and Herman M. Sohrmann
- General contractor: Boaz-Kiel Construction Company

Tenants
- St. Louis Flyers (AHA/AHL) (1929–1953); St. Louis Eagles (NHL) (1934–1935); Chicago Black Hawks (NHL) (occasional use; 1951–1959); Toledo-St. Louis Mercurys (IHL) (1959–1960); St. Louis Braves (CHL) (1963–1967); St. Louis Blues (NHL) (1967–1994); St. Louis Hawks (NBA) (occasional use; 1955–1968); St. Louis Bombers (BAA/NBA) (1946–1950); St. Louis Stars (NASL) (1971, 1974); Spirits of St. Louis (ABA) (1974–1976); St. Louis Steamers (MISL) (1979–1988); St. Louis Storm (MISL) (1989–1992); St. Louis Ambush (NPSL) (1992–1994); St. Louis Vipers (RHI) (1993–1994); Saint Louis Billikens men's basketball (NCAA) (1968–1973 and 1991–1994); Saint Louis Billikens men's ice hockey (1970–1979)

St. Louis Arena (known as the Checkerdome from 1977 to 1983) was an indoor arena in St. Louis, Missouri, United States. The country's second-largest indoor entertainment venue when it opened in 1929, it was home to the St. Louis Blues and other sports franchises. The Arena sat across U.S. 40 (now I-64) from Forest Park's Aviation Field. It was demolished in 1999.

The Arena hosted conventions, concerts, political rallies, horse shows, circuses, boxing matches, professional wrestling, Roller Derby competitions, indoor soccer matches, the 1973 and 1978 NCAA men's basketball Final Four, the NCAA Men's Midwest Regional finals in 1982, 1984, and 1993, the 1992–94 Missouri Valley Conference men's basketball tournament, the 1968, 1969, and 1970 Stanley Cup Finals, and the 1975 NCAA men's Frozen Four ice hockey finals.

== History ==
At the conclusion of the 1904 World's Fair, St. Louis ended its long tradition of annually hosting large indoor agriculture and horse shows. The city tore down its huge St. Louis Exposition and Music Hall and built the St. Louis Coliseum which was aimed at individual events such as boxing matches.

In 1928 the National Dairy Show offered the city the opportunity to become the permanent location for its annual two-week meeting of dairymen and their prize animals. With no public funds available, a group of businessmen raised private funding for what was projected as a $2 million building. The National Exposition Company in charge of the project hired Gustel R. Kiewitt as architect and the Boaz-Kiel Construction Company as general contractor.

Kiewit's design called for a lamella roof supported by 20 cantilever steel trusses, eliminating the need for view-obscuring internal support pillars. The lamella design consisted of Douglas fir ribs, 3.75 inches (9.5 cm) thick, 17.5 inches (44 cm) wide and 15 feet (4.6 m) long, fitted together diagonally and giving the appearance of fish scales. The huge structure was completed in 1929, just over a year after construction began. At 476 feet (145 m) long and 276 feet (84 m) wide, it was behind only Madison Square Garden as the largest indoor entertainment space in the country. A 13-story building could have been erected inside of it.

The Arena was not well-maintained after the 1940s, and its roof was damaged by a February 1959 tornado. After repairs, it was re-opened as the home of the Central Hockey League's St. Louis Braves, a Chicago Blackhawks farm team. The renovations included the removal of the fencing that enforced segregation, dating back to the time of the St. Louis Eagles.

On March 19, 1971, the St. Louis Stars hosted the 1971 NASL Professional Hoc-Soc Tournament here, which was the first indoor soccer tournament sanctioned by a Division One professional league in U.S. history.

In the 1973 NCAA Basketball Final, the UCLA Bruins and legendary coach John Wooden defeated Memphis State 87–66, behind 44 points from Bill Walton who went 21 of 22 from the floor. Over 19,000 were in attendance at the Arena.

On February 13, 1974, the St. Louis Stars played host to the Red Army team at the Arena in the final match of Soviet squad's three-city indoor soccer tour of North America. Attendance for the match was 12,241.

In the 1978 NCAA Basketball Final, the Kentucky Wildcats and coach Joe B. Hall defeated Duke 94–88, led by the 41-point effort of Jack Givens.

From 1978 to 1983, the Kansas City Kings occasionally played the Checkerdome, including 3 games in the 1978–79 season, 4 in the 1979–80 season and 3 in the 1982–83 season.

From 1980 to 1993, St. Louis Arena was the site of the Braggin' Rights basketball game played between the University of Missouri and the University of Illinois.

=== Spirits of St. Louis – ABA Era (1974–76) ===
After the 1968 departure of the NBA's Hawks, the Carolina Cougars moved to the city and took the name Spirits of St. Louis. The Spirits played in the Arena for the final two seasons of the American Basketball Association (ABA), 1974–75 and 1975–76. Their announcer on KMOX radio was a young Bob Costas. Young players such as Steve Jones ("Snapper", later a TV analyst), Marvin Barnes ("Bad News), Maurice Lucas and Moses Malone all played for the Spirits during their tenure at the Arena. The team was not included in the ABA–NBA merger in 1976, when the Indiana Pacers, San Antonio Spurs, Denver Nuggets and New York Nets joined the NBA. The Spirits and the Kentucky Colonels were disbanded. Spirits owners Ozzie and Daniel Silna pulled off a coup in their dissolution agreement when the ABA–NBA merger was finalized. The Silnas negotiated to receive a portion of TV monies in perpetuity, a deal that netted them over $250 million before they were bought out by the NBA in 2014 for a reported $500 million.

=== The St. Louis Blues era (1967–1994) ===
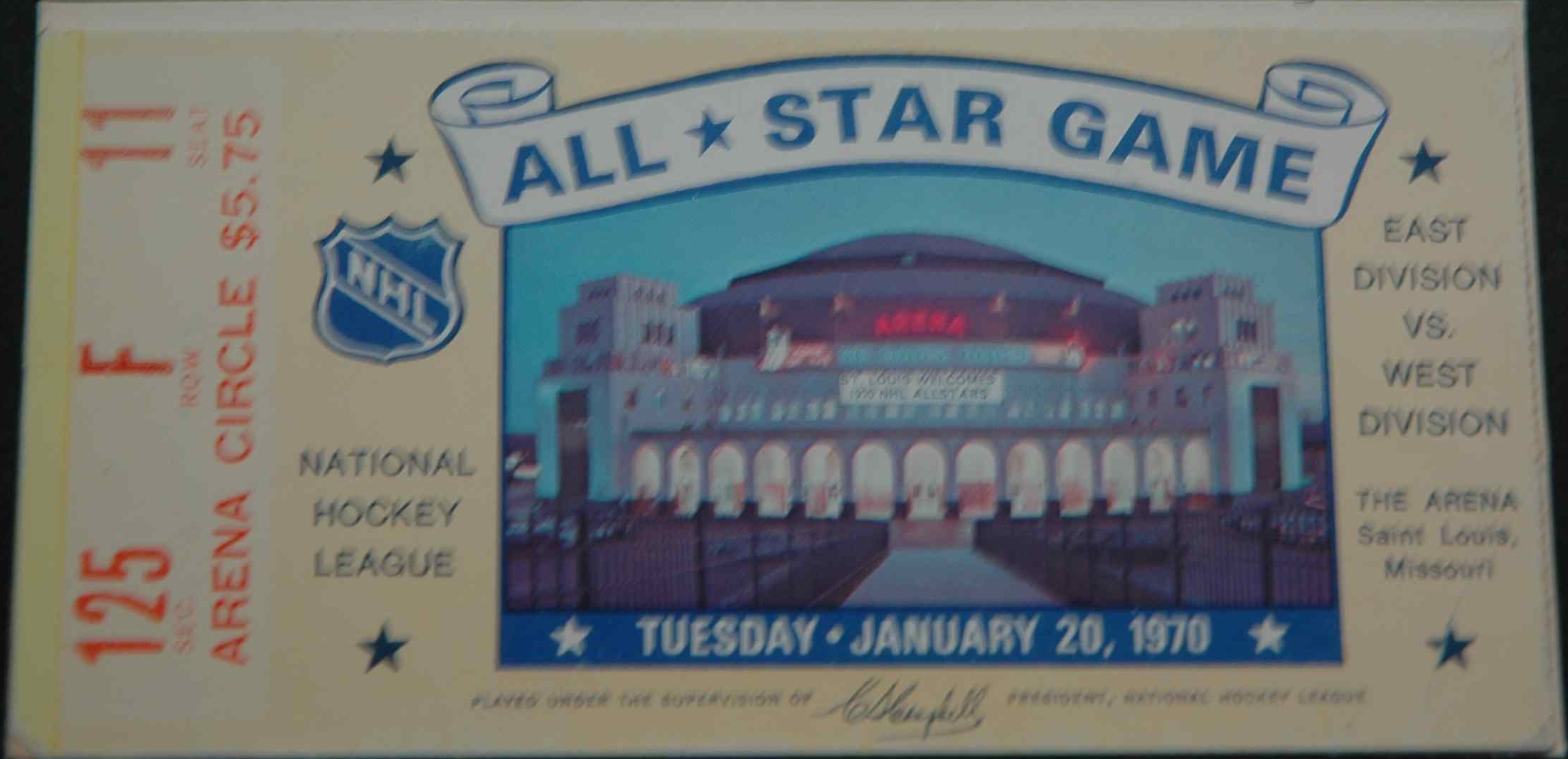
Ticket All Star Game 1970

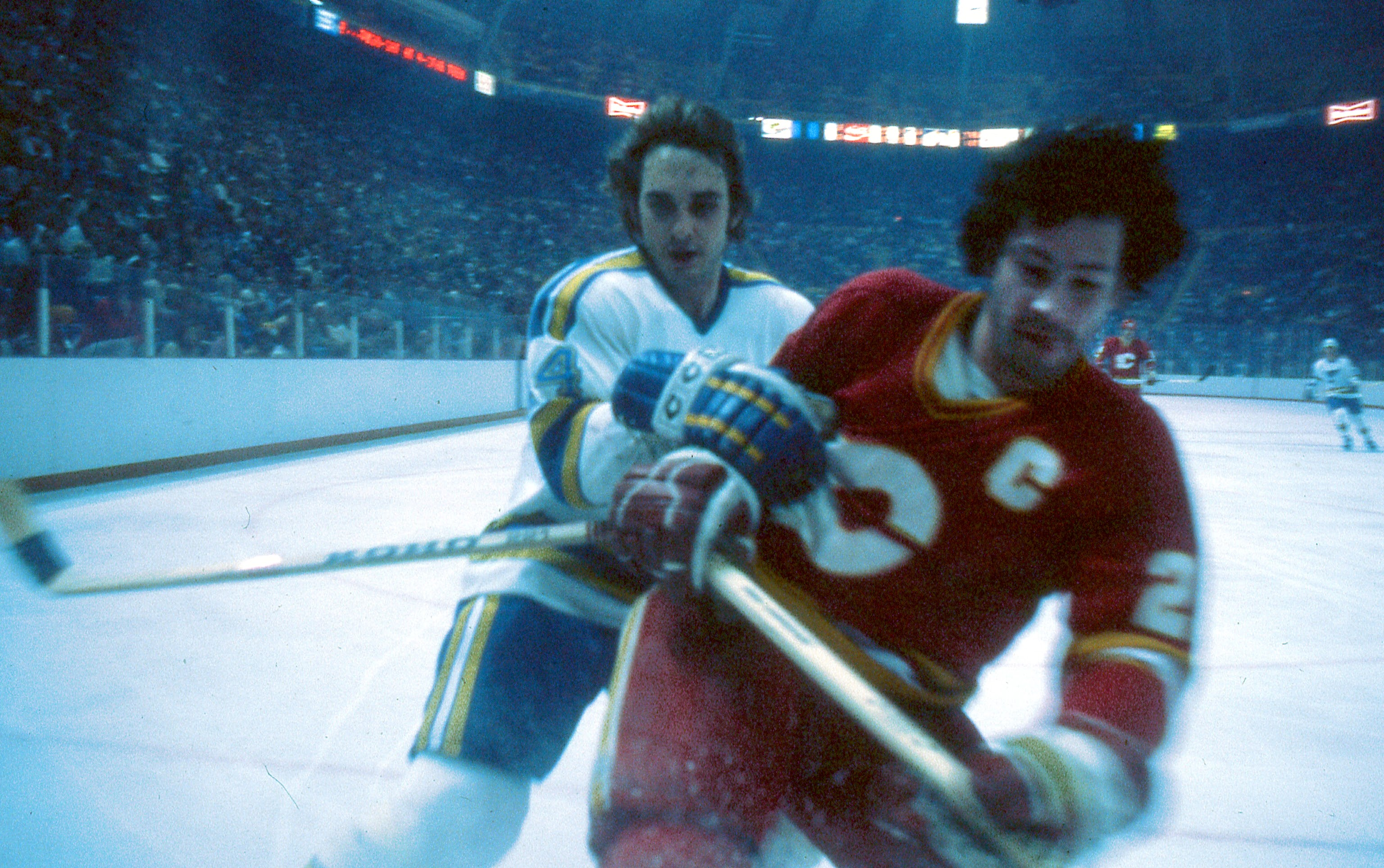
A game between the Blues and the Calgary Flames during the 1980–81 season when the arena was called The Checkerdome

By the time the NHL's St. Louis Blues began playing at the Arena, it had fallen into such poor condition that it had to be heavily renovated for the 1967–68 season. As a condition of getting the expansion franchise, Blues owner Sid Salomon Jr. purchased the Arena from the Chicago Black Hawks and spent several million dollars to renovate the building and add some 3,000 seats, bringing the total to almost 15,000. It never stopped being renovated from that day on, and held almost 20,000 seats by the time the Blues left the Arena in 1994. Many fans considered its sight lines the best of any arena in the league, which is remarkable considering that it was not originally built for hockey. It was also known as one of the loudest arenas in the league.

The Blues played their first game at the Arena on October 11, 1967, against the Minnesota North Stars, which ended in a 2–2 tie. Bill Masterton scored the building's first goal while Larry Keenan scored the first Blues goal. During the summer of 1968, a center-hung Nevco scoreboard was installed, which proved to be the arena's final scoreboard upgrade, although by the late 1980s, the one-line message board on each side was replaced by advertising.

In 1977, the Arena and the Blues were purchased by Ralston Purina, which rechristened the building the Checkerdome after the company's checkerboard logo. By 1983, the cereal and pet food corporation had lost interest in the Blues and the Arena, and forfeited the team to the league. The team was nearly moved to Saskatoon, Saskatchewan, before it was purchased by Harry Ornest, a Los Angeles-based businessman, who promptly returned the Arena to its original name.

The Blues played their final game at the Arena on April 24, 1994, losing game four of the first round to the Dallas Stars 2–1. Phil Housley scored the Blues' final goal in the Arena while Dallas' Mike Modano scored the building's final two goals.

After the Blues moved to their new home, the venue now known as Enterprise Center, during the 1994 offseason, the final event at the St. Louis Arena was a concert by Christian artist Carman Licciardello.

=== Closure and demolition (1994–1999) ===
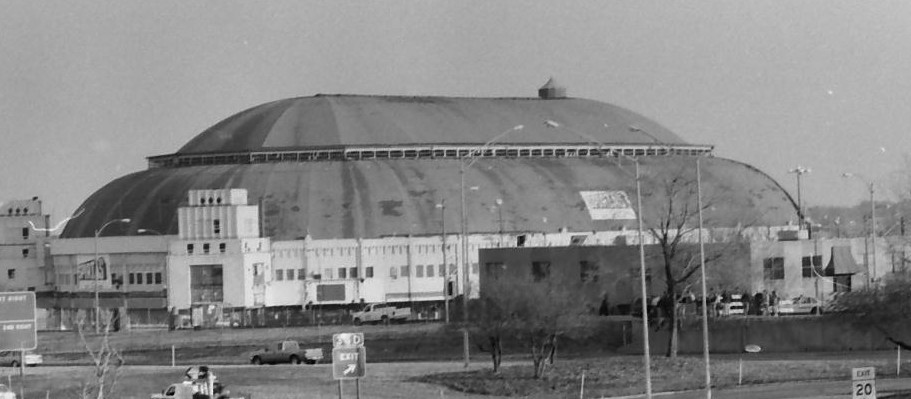
St. Louis Arena on February 27, 1999, the day of its controlled demolition

As a condition for the private financing of the demolition of city-owned Kiel Auditorium and the construction of privately owned Kiel Center (now the Enterprise Center) on the same Downtown site, local business group Civic Progress, Inc. insisted that the Cheltenham-neighborhood would not be allowed to compete with Kiel Center for any events, while the insurance burden for the building was left with the City of St. Louis. With no income allowed for the Arena while insurance expenses continued, the building sat vacant while pressure built on the city government to either make it revenue-producing (essentially impossible under the Civic Progress-imposed non-compete clause) or raze it. The Arena remained vacant for nearly five years before it was demolished in a controlled demolition in 1999.

=== The Arena site today ===
A business/residential development, The Highlands (named after an amusement park that was once adjacent to the site), now occupies the land that the St. Louis Arena called home, and includes the following:

- Four apartment buildings, of which the two northern-most feature loft-style units.
- A Hampton Inn hotel, several restaurants, a coffee shop and bakery, Children's Miracle Network Hospitals of Greater St. Louis, and a yoga studio.
- 1001 Highlands Plaza Drive West, an office building home to—among other businesses—KSDK television's studios and newsroom.
- A grass plaza, with an oval grass section surrounded by concrete sidewalks now sits at 1001 Highlands Plaza Drive West at the location where the original arena stood.
- A medical office building.

== Sports teams ==
Sports teams that called the Arena home include:

- St. Louis Flyers of the AHA and AHL (1929–1953)
- St. Louis Eagles of the NHL (1934–1935)
- Chicago Black Hawks of the NHL (occasional use, 1953–1959)
- St. Louis Braves of the CHL (1963–1967)
- St. Louis Blues of the NHL (1967–1994)
- St. Louis Hawks of the NBA (occasional use, 1955–1968)
- St. Louis Stars of the NASL (1971 and 1974)
- Spirits of St. Louis of the ABA (1974–1976)
- St. Louis Steamers of the MISL (1979–1988)
- St. Louis Storm of the MISL (1989–1992)
- St. Louis Ambush of the NPSL (1992–1994)
- Saint Louis University basketball team (1968–1971, 1975–1976, 1978–1982 and 1991–1994)
- Saint Louis University hockey team (1970–1979)
- St. Louis Vipers of RHI (1993–1994)

== Concerts ==
- Led Zeppelin performed a single sold-out show on February 16, 1975, at the St. Louis Arena as the last show of the first leg of Led Zeppelin North American Tour 1975
- Led Zeppelin performed a single sold-out show on April 15, 1977, at the St. Louis Arena as part of their final North American tour.
- Grateful Dead, May 15, 1977.
- Ted Nugent and Sammy Hagar performed in concert on December 6, 1978. During the show a massive ice storm hit St. Louis and concert goers left the venue to find everything covered in a thick glaze of ice and serious traffic problems.
- The Bee Gees performed here on August 1, 1979, as part of their Spirits Having Flown Tour.
- KISS and John Cougar performed here October 2, 1979.
- Fleetwood Mac performed two sold-out shows here as part of their Tusk Tour on November 5 and 6, 1979.
- The Charlie Daniels Band and Leon Russell performed here on Friday, December 26, 1980.
- The Electric Light Orchestra and Hall & Oates performed here on ELO's Time Tour on October 29, 1981.
- The Police Synchronicity Tour performed here on July 24, 1983, with Joan Jett & the Blackhearts as the opening act.
- Prince performed at the Checkerdome on December 4, 1982. Opening acts were Morris Day and the Time and Vanity 6
- Journey performed at the Arena on September 30, 1986, as part of their Raised on Radio Tour. Their opening acts were Honeymoon Suite, Glass Tiger, The Outfield and Andy Taylor, a member of Duran Duran. August 4, 1979, Journey brought the Evolution Tour to St. Louis
- Pink Floyd performed A Momentary Lapse of Reason Tour at the St. Louis Arena on November 15 and 16, 1987.
- Michael Jackson performed a sold–out show in front of 17,000 people at St. Louis Arena, during his Bad World Tour on March 13, 1988. The scheduled March 12, 1988 was canceled due to sickness and rescheduled for March 14 which was also cancelled.
- Van Halen performed for their OU812 Tour on November 8 and 9, 1988
- ZZ Top performed at St. Louis Arena for their Recycler World Tour on November 7 and 8, 1990.
- Bruce Springsteen performed at the St. Louis Arena January 28, 1981 The River Tour, November 15, 1984 Born In The U.S.A. Tour, April 17, 1988 Tunnel of Love Express Tour and December 3, 1992 1992 World Tour.
- Metallica performed at the St. Louis Arena for their Wherever We May Roam Tour on November 24, 1991
- Neil Diamond performed at the St. Louis Arena December 11, 1977, May 27, 1982, April 26–27, 1983, August 26–27, 1984, December 11–12, 1985, June 13, 1989, and March 10, 1993.
- MC Hammer performed at the arena on July 6, 1990, as part of his Please Hammer Don't Hurt 'Em World Tour, he also performed on June 3, 1993, for his Too Legit to Quit World Tour.

Preceded by Ottawa Auditorium	Home of the St. Louis Eagles; 1934–1935	Succeeded by last arena
Preceded by Milwaukee Arena	Occasional Home of the St. Louis Hawks; 1955–1968	Succeeded by Alexander Memorial Coliseum
Preceded by first arena	Home of the St. Louis Blues; 1967–1994	Succeeded by Kiel Center
Preceded by Montreal Forum, Hartford Civic Center	Host of the NHL All-Star Game; 1970, 1988	Succeeded by Boston Garden, Northlands Coliseum
Preceded by Sports Arena, The Omni	NCAA Men's Division I Basketball Tournament; Finals Venue; 1973, 1978	Succeeded by Greensboro Coliseum, Special Events Center
Preceded by Charlotte Coliseum	Home of the Spirits of St. Louis; 1974–1976	Succeeded by last arena
Preceded by Boston Garden; Boston, Massachusetts	Host of the men's Frozen Four; 1975	Succeeded by University of Denver Arena; Denver, Colorado
Preceded by Kiel Arena	Host of Arch Madness; 1992–1994	Succeeded by Kiel Center
