= Just as Long as We're Together =

Single by Prince

from the album For You
- B-side: "In Love"; "Soft And Wet (Disco Mix)" (12")
- Released: November 21, 1978
- Recorded: October–December 1977
- Genre: Disco; funk
- Length: 3:25 (7" edit); 6:24 (album version)
- Label: Warner Bros.
- Songwriter: Prince
- Producer: Prince

Prince singles chronology
"Soft and Wet" (1978)	"Just as Long as We're Together" (1978)	"I Wanna Be Your Lover" (1979)

"Just as Long as We're Together" is a song by American musician Prince. It was released as the second single released from his 1978 debut album For You. The coda is an instrumental track originally called "Jelly Jam" that was added to the main track, and modified over time to blend into it.

The B-side of the track was the album track, "In Love". The single peaked at number 91 on the R&B chart and did not enter the pop charts.

== Reception ==
While receiving little press upon its release, "Just as Long as We're Together" has retroactively collected acclaim among some critics, who praised the disco influence and blend of musical styles in the song.

== Track listings ==
7-inch single

- A. "Just as Long as We're Together" (edit) – 3:25
- B. "In Love" – 3:38

7-inch promo

- A. "Just as Long as We're Together" (mono edit) – 3:25
- B. "Just as Long as We're Together" (stereo edit) – 3:25

12-inch promo

- A. "Just as Long as We're Together" (disco mix) – 6:29
- B. "Soft and Wet" (disco mix) – 3:02

== Personnel ==
- Prince – lead and backing vocals, electric guitars, clavinet, Fender Rhodes electric piano, Minimoog, ARP String Ensemble, ARP Pro Soloist, bass guitar, fuzz bass, drums, bongos, handclaps, fingersnaps
- Patrice Rushen – synth programming (uncredited)

== Chart performance ==
Chart performance for "Just as Long as We're Together"
Chart (1978)	Peak position
US Billboard Hot Soul Singles	91
