= Too Legit to Quit World Tour =

1992 concert tour by MC Hammer

Too Legit to Quit Tour
- Tour by MC Hammer
- Associated album: Too Legit to Quit
- Start date: March 1992
- End date: November 7, 1992
- Legs: 2
- No. of shows: 116
- Supporting acts: Boyz II Men, Mary J. Blige

MC Hammer concert chronology
- Please Hammer Don't Hurt 'Em World Tour (1990-91); Too Legit To Quit Tour (1992)

Too Legit To Quit World Tour is the second world tour by American recording artist MC Hammer to promote his fourth studio album Too Legit to Quit (1991) performing over 115 shows on two legs visiting North America and Asia. The tour kicked off in Hampton, Virginia on April 1, 1992, and concluded on Quezon City, Philippines on November 7, 1992. The US leg was sponsored by MTV and Pepsi. Boyz II Men were selected as opening act of the shows, while other opening acts included acts included Jodeci, TLC, Oaktown 357 and Mary J. Blige. Following this tour, MC hammer decided to quit touring.

== Background ==
Hammer's previous tour Please Hammer Don't Hurt 'Em World Tour (1990-1991) was a commercial success performing over 144 shows and grossing US$32.1 million of dollars. Also, Hammer's third studio album Please Hammer Don't Hurt 'Em sold over 15 million of copies by the end of 1991. On October 29, 1991, the artist release his fourth studio album Too Legit to Quit (1991). To promote it, Capitol records embarked at the largest marketing campaign of their history. The plans included a 150 dates world tour. However, around 115 shows were played.

For the tour, Hammer traveled with 14 backup singers, more than a dozen musicians, no fewer than 10 dancers and 30 members of entourage. Also, 12 equipment trucks haul (including three trucks for wardrobe alone), around 132 sound cabinets and four onstage video screens, while nine buses are filled with 110 tour persons, including 50 who appear onstage (two drummers, two percussionists, four keyboardists, a bassist, lead guitarist, 14 singers, horns and lots and lots of dancers) – an onstage contingent for whom some 5,000 new outfits (100 per person) were stitched together.

== Reception ==
=== Critical reception ===
Unlike his previous tour, Too Legit To Quit received mixed to lukewarm reception by the critics. Sonya Donaldson from the Los Angeles Sentinel attended to the concert in Inglewood, praising the opening acts Jodeci, TLC and Boyz II Men, however, wrote considered Hammer show "boring". On the same hand, Mick Gzowski gave a lukewarm review to the Vancouver concert at the Pacific Coliseum writing "Vegas-style rapstravaganza pleases fans more than pocketbook".

=== Commercial response ===
Several shows were reported sold out while in some cities such as New York, Oakland and Houston, a second show was added due the high demand. Over 5,675 fans were reported at Allentown Fairs. Ahead of his concert at Omaha, Nebraska, the Omaha World-Herald named Hammer as "one of the most popular rap artists in the 15-year history of that musical genre". However, only 5,000 tickets of 15,000 was reported sold on Vancouver.

== Tour dates ==
Date	City	Country	Venue
North America
April 1, 1992	Hampton	United States	Hampton Coliseum
April 2, 1992	Roanoke	United States	Roanoke Civic Center
April 3, 1992	Charlotte	United States	Charlotte Coliseum
April 4, 1992	Chapel Hill	United States	Dean. E. Smith Student Activities Center
April 5, 1992	Columbia	United States	Carolina Coliseum
April 6, 1992	Evansville	United States	Roberts Municipal Stadium
April 7, 1992	Gainesville	United States	Stephen C. O Conell Center
April 8, 1992	Jacksonville	United States	Jacksonville Memorial Coliseum
April 10, 1992	Miami	United States	Miami Arena
April 11, 1992	St. Petersburg	United States	Florida Suncoast Dome
April 12, 1992	Orlando	United States	Orlando Arena
April 14, 1992	Tallahassee	United States	Leon County Civic Center
April 16, 1992	Chattanooga	United States	UTC Arena
April 17, 1992	Knoxville	United States	Thompson-Boling Arena
April 18, 1992	Atlanta	United States	The Omni
April 21, 1992	Charleston	United States	Charleston Civic Center
April 22, 1992	Philadelphia	United States	Spectrum
April 24, 1992	Landover	United States	Capital Centre
April 25, 1992	Worcester	United States	Centrum
April 26, 1992	Baltimore	United States	Baltimore Arena
April 28, 1992	Ames	United States	Hilton Coliseum
April 29, 1992	Carbondale	United States	SIU Arena
April 30, 1992	Murfreesboro	United States	Charles M. Murphy Athletic Center
May 1, 1992	Louisville	United States	Freedom Hall
May 3, 1992	Champaign	United States	Assembly Hall
May 6, 1992	Evansville	United States	Roberts Municipal Stadium
May 8, 1992	Pittsburgh	United States	Civic Arena
May 9, 1992	Hartford	United States	Hartford Civic Center
May 12, 1992	Portland	United States	Cumberland County Civic Center
May 13, 1992	Providence	United States	Providence Civic Center
May 15, 1992	New York	United States	Madison Square Garden
May 16, 1992	New York	United States	Madison Square Garden
May 20, 1992	Buffalo	United States	Buffalo Memorial Auditorium
May 23, 1992	Rosemont	United States	Rosemont Horizon
May 24, 1992	Rosemont	United States	Rosemont Horizon
May 26, 1992	Minneapolis	United States	Target Center
May 28, 1992	Milwaukee	United States	Bradley Center
May 29, 1992	Detroit	United States	Joe Louis Arena
May 30, 1992	Detroit	United States	Joe Louis Arena
June 3, 1992	St. Louis	United States	St. Louis Arena
June 6, 1992	Dallas	United States	Reunion Arena
June 7, 1992	Austin	United States	Frank Erwin Center
June 10, 1992	San Antonio	United States	HemisFair Arena
June 11, 1992	Baton Rouge	United States	Pete Maravich Assembly Center
June 12, 1992	Houston	United States	The Summit
June 13, 1992	Houston	United States	The Summit
June 14, 1992	Lafayette	United States	Cajundome
June 16, 1992	Beaumont	United States	Montagne Center
June 17, 1992	Shreveport	United States	Hirsch Memorial Coliseum
June 18, 1992	Valley Center	United States	Kansas Coliseum
June 19, 1992	Lubbock	United States	Municipal Coliseum
June 20, 1992	Las Cruces	United States	Pan American Center
June 21, 1992	Albuquerque	United States	Tingley Coliseum
June 23, 1992	Salt Lake City	United States	Delta Center
June 24, 1992	Reno	United States	Lawlor Events Center
June 25, 1992	Reno	United States	Lawlor Events Center
June 26, 1992	Las Vegas	United States	Thomas & Mack Center
June 27, 1992	Phoenix	United States	America West Arena
June 28, 1992	San Diego	United States	San Diego Sports Arena
June 29, 1992	Tucson	United States	Pima County Fairgrounds
June 30, 1992	Palm Springs	United States	Palm Springs Convention Center
July 1, 1992	Sacramento	United States	ARCO Arena
July 2, 1992	Oakland	United States	Alameda County Coliseum
July 3, 1992	Oakland	United States	Alameda County Coliseum
July 4, 1992	Oakland	United States	Alameda County Coliseum
July 5, 1992	Spokane	United States	Spokane Coliseum
July 6, 1992	Oakland	United States	Alameda County Coliseum
July 7, 1992	Fresno	United States	Selland Arena
July 10, 1992	Inglewood	United States	Great Western Forum
July 11, 1992	Inglewood	United States	Great Western Forum
July 12, 1992	Irvine	United States	Meadows Amphitheatre
July 14, 1992	Portland	United States	Memorial Coliseum
July 17, 1992	Seattle	United States	Seattle Center Arena
July 18, 1992	Vancouver	Canada	Pacific Coliseum
July 20, 1992	Greenwood Village	United States	Fiddler's Green Amphitheatre
July 22, 1992	Boise	United States	BSU Pavilion
July 23, 1992	Pocatello	United States	Holt Arena
July 24, 1992	Casper	United States	Events Center
July 25, 1992	Denver	United States	McNichols Sports Arena
July 26, 1992	Cedar Rapids	United States	Five Seasons Center
July 27, 1992	Omaha	United States	Civic Auditorium
July 28, 1992	Des Moines	United States	Veterans Memorial Auditorium
July 29, 1992	Kalamazoo	United States	Wings Stadium
July 30, 1992	Rockford	United States	MetroCentre
July 31, 1992	Terre Haute	United States	Hulman Center
August 1, 1992	Springfield	United States	Prairie Capital Convention Center
August 3, 1992	Fort Wayne	United States	Allen Country War Memorial Coliseum
August 5, 1992	New Haven	United States	New Haven Veterans Memorial Coliseum
August 6, 1992	Wheeling	United States	Wheeling Civic Center
August 8, 1992	Toronto	Canada	SkyDome
August 9, 1992	Rochester	United States	Rochester Community War Memorial
August 13, 1992	East Rutherford	United States	Brendan Byrne Arena
August 14, 1992	Fairfax	United States	Patroit Center
August 16, 1992	Atlanta	United States	Coca-Cola Lakewood Amphitheatre
August 18, 1992	Savannah	United States	Savannah Civic Center
August 19, 1992	Detroit	United States	Joe Louis Arena
August 20, 1992	Springfield	United States	Fairgrounds Grandstand
August 21, 1992	Macon	United States	Macon Coliseum
August 22, 1992	Tinley Park	United States	World Music Theatre
August 23, 1992	Mason	United States	Timberwolf Amphitheater
August 25, 1992	Huntsville	United States	Von Braun Civic Center
August 26, 1992	Birmingham	United States	Birmingham-Jefferson Civic Center Coliseum
August 27, 1992	Little Rock	United States	Barton Coliseum
August 28, 1992	Fort Worth	United States	Tarrant County Convention Center
August 29, 1992	Jackson	United States	Mississippi Coliseum
August 30, 1992	New Orleans	United States	Louisiana Superdome
September 2, 1992	Pensacola	United States	Pensacola Civic Center
September 5, 1992	Cincinnati	United States	Riverfront Coliseum
September 6, 1992	Normal	United States	Redbird Arena
September 7, 1992	Notre Dame	United States	Joyce Center
September 8, 1992	Allentown	United States	Allentown Fairgrounds
September 17, 1992	Mexico City	Mexico	Palacio de los Deportes
Asia
November 3, 1992	Singapore	Singapore	Singapore Indoor Stadium
November 5, 1992	Quezon City	Philippines	Araneta Coliseum
November 6, 1992	Quezon City	Philippines	Araneta Coliseum
November 7, 1992	Quezon City	Philippines	Araneta Coliseum
November 8, 1992	Quezon City	Philippines	Araneta Coliseum
November 16, 1992	Tokyo	Japan	Tokyo Dome
