= Here Comes the Hammer =

Single by MC Hammer

from the album Please Hammer Don't Hurt 'Em
- Released: December 1990
- Genre: Hip hop; dance
- Length: 5:50
- Label: Capitol
- Songwriter: Stanley Burrell
- Producer: MC Hammer

MC Hammer singles chronology
"Pray" (1990)	"Here Comes the Hammer" (1990)	"2 Legit 2 Quit" (1991)

"Here Comes the Hammer" is a song written and performed by American rapper MC Hammer, first released on his third album, Please Hammer Don't Hurt 'Em (1990). It was released as a single on December 12, 1990 by Capitol Records, reaching number 54 on both the US Billboard Hot 100 and Cash Box Top 100 charts. The song also became a top-20 hit on the Billboard Hot R&B/Hip-Hop Songs and Hot Rap Songs charts. It was nominated for a Grammy Award. At the time of its release, the music video accompanying the release of the single was one of the most expensive ever.

== Lyrics and music ==
Hartford Courant critic Dawne Simon described "Here Comes the Hammer" as "upbeat", but the lyrics as "egotistical chants". Billboard described it as a "James Brown-inspired funk rave, replete with rapid-fire rhyming, a rousing chant at the chorus and infectious synth line". The song samples Brown's 1970 hit "Super Bad".

== Reception ==
Billboard magazine considered "Here Comes the Hammer" to be a "winner". However, although the three previous singles from the album were Top 10 hits, "Here Comes the Hammer" stalled at number 54 on the Billboard Hot 100. It performed better on the Billboard Hot R&B/Hip-Hop Songs and Hot Rap Songs charts, peaking at number 15 and number 17, respectively. Stephen Dalton from NME wrote, "Although his recent hits have always leaned heavily on other people's work, Hammer has sampled James Brown so blatantly and completely here that his own fleeting presence is utterly superfluous." The song was nominated for a 1991 Grammy Award for Best Rap Solo Performance at the 34th Annual Grammy Awards.

"Here Comes the Hammer" was later included on Hammer's 1996 compilation album, Greatest Hits. It was also included on the multi-artist compilation album, Original Hits: Rap & Soul, in 2010.

== Authorship controversy ==
Besides utilizing James Brown's "Super Bad," at least two other authors claimed that "Here Comes the Hammer" was based on their work. The band Legend Seven claimed that the refrain chanting "uh oh" was taken from one of their songs. In addition, a musician named Kevin Abdullah sued Hammer, claiming that the hook and refrain were taken from his song "Oh Oh, You Got the Shing", and that "Here Comes the Hammer" "incorporated substantial and significant portions" of "Oh Oh, You Got the Shing". Abdullah claimed that he had once auditioned "Oh Oh, You Got the Shing" for Hammer, and sent Hammer a demo tape containing it, which Hammer rejected. Hammer eventually settled the suit for $250,000.

== Music video ==
The music video accompanying "Here Comes the Hammer" cost more than $1 million, making it one of the most expensive music videos ever made at the time. The MTV version of the video was almost nine minutes long, and a fifteen minute version was also available. The plot of the video involves Hammer and his dancers getting chased through various rooms of a haunted house. New York Daily News critic Michael Saunders criticized the video for emphasizing the lame plot over MC Hammer's dancing. Both Saunders and Entertainment Weekly critic James Farber criticized most of the expensive special effects, but Saunders praised the effects used to create a montage of Hammer dancing with [James] Brown, whose backing band is what Saunders believes is "the engine powering the single".

== Track listing ==
1. "Here Comes The Hammer" (12" Remix)
2. "Here Comes The Hammer" (12" Remix Instrumental)
3. "Here Comes The Hammer (Uh-Oh Here Comes The Hammer '91)"
4. "Here Comes The Hammer" (7" Edit)

== Charts ==
=== Weekly charts ===
Weekly chart performance for "Here Comes the Hammer"
Chart (1991)	Peak position
Australia (ARIA)	37
Belgium (Ultratop 50 Flanders)	27
Germany (GfK)	32
Luxembourg (Radio Luxembourg)	10
Netherlands (Dutch Top 40)	21
Netherlands (Single Top 100)	19
New Zealand (Recorded Music NZ)	6
UK Singles (Official Charts)	15
UK Airplay (Music Week)	21
UK Dance (Music Week)	20
US Billboard Hot 100	54
US Dance Club Songs (Billboard)	29
US Hot R&B/Hip-Hop Songs (Billboard)	15
US Cash Box Top 100	54

=== Year-end charts ===
1991 year-end chart performance for "Here Comes the Hammer"
Chart (1991)	Position
Netherlands (Dutch Top 40)	194

=== Certifications ===
Sale certifications for "Here Comes the Hammer"
Region	Certification	Certified units/sales
United States (RIAA) Video single	2× Platinum	100,000^{^}
^{^} Shipments figures based on certification alone.
