= Please Hammer Don't Hurt 'Em World Tour =

1990–1991 concert tour by MC Hammer

- Tour by MC Hammer
- Poster to the concert in Frankfurt, Germany
- Associated album: Please Hammer Don't Hurt 'Em
- Start date: June 15, 1990
- End date: August 3, 1991
- Legs: 4
- No. of shows: 144
- Supporting acts: En Vogue and Vanilla Ice
- Box office: US$32 million

MC Hammer concert chronology
- Please Hammer Don't Hurt 'Em World Tour; Too Legit To Quit World Tour (1992)

Please Hammer Don't Hurt 'Em World Tour is the first world tour by American recording artist MC Hammer to promote his album Please Hammer Don't Hurt 'Em. It was sponsored by Pepsi-Cola and promoted by MTV. Beginning in Louisville, Kentucky, on June 15, 1990, it visited North America, Europe, Asia and Oceania, concluded in Paso Robles, California, on August 3, 1991. With a total of 144 shows, it grossed over $32 million.

The tour was a box office success. Pollstar ranked Hammer at seventh on the Top 10 highest-grossing act to tour U.S. of 1990. Also, it received generally positive reviews by the critics while some praising Hammer's energetic stage performance. Several acts were selected as opening acts of the tour. The first shows in United States were opened After 7, Michel'le, and Oaktown's 3.5.7 and later by En Vogue and fellow rapper Vanilla Ice. The European leg was supported by Snap! and the last leg by the group B Angie B.

== Background ==
By June 1990, Please Hammer Don't Hurt 'Em become the first rap album to top the pop charts and by August it become the best-selling rap album of all time, surpassing License to Ill by Beastie Boys. Initial plans to tour the tour stated that it would visit North America, Europe, Japan and Australia. However, more shows were added due the high demand of tickets. Hammer led a 30-member troupe that included a live band, 10 backup singers, 15 dancers and some of the flashiest fashions this side of Mardi Gras. On the first concerts, the show consisted on five acts, four opening acts: Troop, After 7, Michel'le and Oaktown's 3.5.7 and the main act MC Hammer. The main artist performance was 80 to 90 minutes, with eight dancers and 10 backup singers. Fellow rapper Vanilla Ice also was selected as opening act until the end of November 1990, when he dropped out to do his own tour as a headliner.

During the tour, Hammer traveled by private Boeing 727 jet, the touring group included fifteen dancers, a dozen background singers, eight security, seven musicians, three valets and two DJs. According to some media outlets, rap fans had never seen anything of the magnitude of the Hammer Don't Hurt ’Em stadium gigs, which recalled Parliament-Funkadelic’s army-size traveling heyday in the 1970s. The first North America leg received several sponsors, including MTV, Pepsi, and Kentucky Fried Chicken. The European and Asia legs were sponsored by Pepsi.

== Reception ==
=== Critical reception ===
The tour received generally positive reviews by the critics praising Hammer's performance and charisma on stage. Rolling Stone claimed that the tour was "the most elaborate live show ever mounted by a rap entertainer". David Surkamp gave a positive review of the St. Louis concert and wrote "M.C. Hammer Delivers Knockout Performance". Reggie Matthews gave a positive review to the concert at the San Diego Sports Arena, stating "Thanks to Hammer, rap is no longer pomp, stroll, strut and attitude. It now features the latest dance crazes and synchronized choreography". Patricia Smith attended the Rosemont Horizon show and wrote "he and his energetic posse had loosened a few ceiling fixtures, interfered with air traffic control at nearby O'Hare Airport and assured every single gasping audience member that they'd gotten more than their money's worth". In Canada, Rod Campbell attended the concert in Edmonton and wrote a positive review titled "M.C. Hammer nails crowd; Rap's first superstar dazzles with dynamic show".

On a less positive note, John Lannert from Sun Sentinel reviewed the concert of June 30, 1990, at Miami Arena stating "Hammer did not rap enough or dance enough, and was weighed down throughout the concert by an overblown stage-side production that condemned the show to a sputtering, momentum-killing pace". Parry Gettleman from the Orlando Sentinel gave a positive review to the opening act After 7 stating "showed a vocal mix and elegant style recalling the Temptations and the Spinners", however criticized the main act performance, stating "It's a shame Hammer sometimes confused performing and cheerleading, because when he stuck to the former, 'Hammer time' was enjoyable." Steve Morse gave a mixed review to the concert at Worcester on a review titled "Hammer Time' Misses a Beat".

=== Commercial reception ===
The tour was a commercial success with several shows reported sold out while other cities added more shows due the high demand. Initially, the summer leg in North America was planned to be around 50 to 60 shows, however, more shows were added. Ticket prices for the North America leg were between $17 and $30. The Miami arena concert was reported "packed" with 15,000 fans. The concert of July 1, 1990, in Tampa, was reported with 10,000 fans. The concert at the Wings Stadium in Kalamazoo had attendance of 8,100 and over 10,000 in Atlanta at The Omni. In Canada, over 6,000 fans were reported at the Montreal concert. On December 20, 1990, around 1,000 fans asked for refunds after learning that the opening acts En Vogue and Vanilla Ice did not show up. Also, media reported that just 3,000 of the 25,000 tickets were sold of the Tacoma Dome concert on July 26, 1991.

By January 1991, Hammer was ranked seventh at Pollstar Top 10 highest-grossing act to tour U.S. for grossing US$26.3 million of 138 shows in 132 cities. In Japan, 55,000 tickets were sold for the first concert at the Tokyo Dome. Due to the high demand another show was added. The concert in Auckland, New Zealand, was reported sold out. Several shows were added at the Wembley Arena in London due the high demand. According to Billboard, by the end of the tour, it grossed over US$32 million in 144 shows around the world.

== Tour dates ==
Date	City	Country	Venue
June 15, 1990	Louisville	United States	Louisville Gardens
June 21, 1990	Knoxville	United States	Thompson-Boling Arena
June 24, 1990	Antioch	United States	Starwood Amphitheatre
June 28, 1990	Tallahassee	United States	Leon County Civic Center
June 30, 1990	Miami	United States	Miami Arena
July 1, 1990	Tampa	United States	USF Sun Dome
July 4, 1990	Grove City	United States	Capital Music Center
July 6, 1990	St. Louis	United States	St. Louis Arena
July 7, 1990	Kansas City	United States	Kemper Arena
July 8, 1990	Kalamazoo	United States	Wings Stadium
July 12, 1990	Greenville	United States	Greenville Memorial Auditorium
July 13, 1990	Augusta	United States	Augusta Civic Center
July 18, 1990	Huntsville	United States	Von Braun Center
July 19, 1990	Chattanooga	United States	UTC Arena
July 21, 1990	Hampton	United States	Hampton Coliseum
July 22, 1990	Baltimore	United States	Baltimore Arena
July 26, 1990	Pittsburgh	United States	Civic Arena
July 27, 1990	Philadelphia	United States	Spectrum
July 29, 1990	Landover	United States	Capital Centre
August 1, 1990	Alburquerque	United States	Tingley Coliseum
August 2, 1990	Phoenix	United States	Arizona Veterans Memorial Coliseum
August 3, 1990	Las Vegas	United States	Thomas & Mack Center
August 4, 1990	San Diego	United States	San Diego Sports Arena
August 5, 1990	Sacramento	United States	ARCO Arena
August 7, 1990	Salt Lake CIty	United States	Salt Palace
August 8, 1990	Denver	United States	McNichols Sports Arena
August 10, 1990	Oklahoma City	United States	Myriad Convention Center
August 11, 1990	Houston	United States	The Summit
August 12, 1990	Baton Rouge	United States	Riverside Centroplex
August 13, 1990	Pensacola	United States	Pensacola Civic Center
August 15, 1990	Cincinnati	United States	Riverfront Coliseum
August 16, 1990	Saginaw	United States	Wendler Arena
August 17, 1990	Rosemont	United States	Rosemont Horizon
August 18, 1990	Detroit	United States	Joe Louis Arena
August 20, 1990	Rockford	United States	MetroCentre
August 24, 1990	Orlando	United States	Orlando Arena
August 31, 1990	Dallas	United States	Reunion Arena
September 2, 1990	Atlanta	United States	The Omni
September 9, 1990	Fresno	United States	Selland Arena
September 13, 1990	Inglewood	United States	Great Western Forum
September 15, 1990	Philadelphia	United States	Veterans Stadium
September 18, 1990	Omaha	United States	Omaha Civic Auditorium
September 19, 1990	Cedar Rapids	United States	Five Seasons Center
September 20, 1990	Peoria	United States	Peoria Civic Center
September 21, 1990	Noblesville	United States	Deer Creek Music Center
September 23, 1990	Bloomington	United States	Met Center
September 26, 1990	Bethlehem	United States	Stabler Arena
September 27, 1990	Worcester	United States	Centrum
September 28, 1990	East Rutherford	United States	Brendan Byrne Arena
September 30, 1990	Norfolk	United States	Scope Arena
October 4, 1990	Roanoke	United States	Roanoke Civic Center
October 5, 1990	Columbia	United States	Carolina Coliseum
October 7, 1990	Fairfax	United States	Patriot Center
October 10, 1990	Syracuse	United States	Onondaga War Memorial Auditorium
October 13, 1990	Buffalo	United States	Buffalo Memorial Auditorium
October 14, 1990	Albany	United States	Knickerbocker Arena
October 16, 1990	Toronto	Canada	SkyDome
October 17, 1990	Montreal	Canada	Forum de Montreal
October 19, 1990	Richfield	United States	Richfield Coliseum
October 20, 1990	Carbondale	United States	SIU Arena
October 21, 1990	Auburn Hills	United States	The Palace of Auburn Hills
October 22, 1990	Madison	United States	Dane County Memorial Coliseum
October 25, 1990	Kansas City	United States	Kemper Arena
October 26, 1990	Champaign	United States	Assembly Hall
October 28, 1990	Milwaukee	United States	Bradley Center
October 30, 1990	Kalamazoo	United States	Wings Stadium
November 2, 1990	Fort Wayne	United States	Allen Country War Memorial Coliseum
November 3, 1990	Columbia	United States	Hearnes Center
November 4, 1990	Chicago	United States	UIC Pavilion
November 6, 1990	Miami	United States	Miami Arena
November 8, 1990	Tampa	United States	USF Sun Dome
November 9, 1990	Macon	United States	Macon Coliseum
November 10, 1990	Murfreesboro	United States	Charles M. Murphy Athletic Center
November 11, 1990	Chapel Hill	United States	Dean E. Smith Student Activities Center
November 13, 1990	Knoxville	United States	Thompson-Boling Arena
November 15, 1990	Memphis	United States	Mid-South Coliseum
November 16, 1990	Biloxi	United States	Mississippi Coast Coliseum
November 20, 1990	Lafayette	United States	Cajundome
November 21, 1990	Houston	United States	The Summit
November 22, 1990	New Orleans	United States	Lakefront Arena
November 24, 1990	Little Rock	United States	Barton Coliseum
November 30, 1990	Denver	United States	McNichols Sports Arena
December 2, 1990	Tucson	United States	Tucson Convention Center
December 3, 1990	Tempe	United States	ASU Activity Center
December 5, 1990	Sacramento	United States	ARCO Arena
December 6, 1990	Fresno	United States	Selland Arena
December 7, 1990	Long Beach	United States	Long Beach Arena
December 9, 1990	Reno	United States	Lawlor Events Center
December 13, 1990	Portland	United States	Portland Memorial Coliseum
December 15, 1990	Vancouver	Canada	Pacific Coliseum
December 17, 1990	Portland	United States	Portland Memorial Coliseum
December 20, 1990	Boise	United States	BSU Pavilion
December 21, 1990	Tacoma	United States	Tacoma Dome
Oceania and Asia
February 26, 1991	Auckland	New Zealand	Mount Smart Stadium
March 19, 1991	Melbourne	Australia	Rod Laver Arena
March 26, 1991	Tokyo	Japan	Tokyo Dome
March 27, 1991	Tokyo	Japan	Tokyo Dome
March 29, 1991	Manila	Philippines	Araneta Coliseum
Europe
April 6, 1991	Rotterdam	Netherlands	Ahoy
April 8, 1991	Munich	Germany	Olympiahalle
April 9, 1991	Zurich	Switzerland	Hallenstadion
April 11, 1991	Madrid	Spain	Palacio de Deportes de la Comunidad de Madrid
April 12, 1991	Barcelona	Spain	Palau Sant Jordi
April 16, 1991	Frankfurt	Germany	Festhalle
April 17, 1991	Düsseldorf	Germany	Philipshalle
April 20, 1991	Paris	France	Le Zenith
April 21, 1991	Brussels	Belgium	Forest National
April 24, 1991	Berlin	Germany	Deutschlandhalle
April 27, 1991	Stockholm	Sweden	Globe Arena
April 28, 1991	Oslo	Norway	Oslo Spektrum
May 2, 1991	Birmingham	England	NEC Arena
May 4, 1991	London	England	Wembley Arena
May 5, 1991	London	England	Wembley Arena
May 6, 1991	London	England	Wembley Arena
May 8, 1991	Manchester	England	G-MEX Centre
May 10, 1991	London	England	Wembley Arena
May 11, 1991	London	England	Wembley Arena
May 12, 1991 (Note: The concert of May 12, 1991, in London was part of All-Star Tribute "The Simple Truth Concert")	London	England	Wembley Arena
May 17, 1991	Whitley Bay	England	Whitley Bay Ice Rink
May 18, 1991	Glasgow	Scotland	SECC Glasgow Hall 4
North America
June 21, 1991	Knoxville	United States	Thompson-Boling Arena
July 5, 1991	Salem	United States	L.B Day Amphitheatre
July 26, 1991	Tacoma	United States	Tacoma Dome
July 27, 1991 (Note: The concert of July 27, 1991, was part of Penticton's Peach Festival)	Penticton	Canada	Kings Park
July 28, 1991	Calgary	Canada	Olympic Saddledome
July 29, 1991	Edmonton	Canada	Northlands Coliseum
August 3, 1991	Paso Robles	United States	California Mid-State Fairgrounds

=== Box office data ===
City	Country	Attendance	Box office
Bloomington	United States	12,390 / 14,478 (86%)	$255,963
Knoxville	United States	9,210 / 12,006 (77%)	$161,153
Tallahassee	United States	9,648 / 10,006 (96%)	$154,275
Atlanta	United States	14,894 / 17,154 (87%)	$292,017
Richfield	United States	17,472 / 19,746 (88%)	$343,286
Philadelphia	United States	24,875 / 66,943 (37%)	$371,775
Worcester	United States	10,800 / 10,800 (100%)	$225,630
Fairfax	United States	8,743 / 10,000 (87%)	$186,997
Toronto	Canada	11,053 / 14,000 (79%)	$260,128
Vancouver	Canada	12,469 / 15,162 (82%)	$301,858
Arbun Hills	United States	17,928 / 17,928 (100%)	$392,881
Madison	United States	10,250 / 10,250 (100%)	$199,246
Columbia	United States	10,366 / 10,366 (100%)	$195,673
Houston	United States	14,081 / 15,000 (94%)	$266,583
Carbondale	United States	8,087 / 10,800 (75%)	$148,325
London	United Kingdom	11,500 / 11,500 (100%)	$295,463
Calgary	Canada	7,062 / 12,197 (58%)	$176,670
Paso Robles	United States	21,489 / 30,446 (71%)	$472,820
Total		226,323 / 308,782 (73%)	$4,700,923
