= Grammy Award for Best Rap Solo Performance =

Award for best rap/hip hop performance

The Grammy Award for Best Rap Solo Performance was awarded from 1991 to 2011, alongside the Best Rap Performance by a Duo or Group. Previously, a single award was presented for Best Rap Performance.

In 2003, this award was split into separate awards for Best Female Rap Solo Performance and Best Male Rap Solo Performance. In 2005, it was again presented as a single award.

As of 2012, the award was permanently discontinued due to a major overhaul of Grammy categories. Since 2012, all solo and duo/group rap performances has been shifted to the revived Best Rap Performance category.

Years reflect the year in which the Grammy Awards were presented, for works released from October a year and a half prior to September the previous year.

== Recipients ==
| Year^{[I]} | Performing artists | Work | Nominees | Ref. |
|---|---|---|---|---|
| 1991 | MC Hammer | "U Can't Touch This" | Queen Latifah – All Hail the Queen; Big Daddy Kane – "I Get The Job Done"; Vanilla Ice – "Ice Ice Baby"; Monie Love – "Monie In The Middle" | |
| 1992 | LL Cool J | "Mama Said Knock You Out" | MC Hammer – "Here Comes the Hammer"; Monie Love – "It's a Shame (My Sister)"; Queen Latifah - "Fly Girl"; Ice-T – "New Jack Hustler (Nino's Theme)" | |
| 1993 | Sir Mix-a-Lot | "Baby Got Back" | MC Hammer – "Addams Groove"; Queen Latifah – "Latifah's Had It Up 2 Here"; LL Cool J – "Strictly Business"; Marky Mark and the Funky Bunch – "You Gotta Believe" | |
| 1994 | Dr. Dre | "Let Me Ride" | Paperboy – "Ditty"; Sir Mix-a-Lot – "Just Da Pimpin' In Me"; MC Lyte – "Ruffneck"; LL Cool J – "Stand by Your Man" | |
| 1995 | Queen Latifah | "U.N.I.T.Y." | Coolio – "Fantastic Voyage"; Craig Mack – "Flava in Ya Ear"; Snoop Doggy Dogg – "Gin and Juice"; Warren G – "This D.J." | |
| 1996 | Coolio | "Gangsta's Paradise" | The Notorious B.I.G. – "Big Poppa"; 2Pac – "Dear Mama"; Skee-Lo – "I Wish"; Dr. Dre – "Keep Their Heads Ringin'" | |
| 1997 | LL Cool J | "Hey Lover" | Coolio – "1, 2, 3, 4 (Sumpin' New)"; Nas – "If I Ruled the World (Imagine That)"; Heavy D – "Rock With You"; Busta Rhymes – "Woo Hah!! Got You All in Check" | |
| 1998 | Will Smith | "Men in Black" | Busta Rhymes – "Put Your Hands Where My Eyes Could See"; LL Cool J – "Ain't Nobody"; Missy Elliott – "The Rain (Supa Dupa Fly)"; The Notorious B.I.G. – "Hypnotize" | |
| 1999 | Will Smith | "Gettin' Jiggy wit It" | Busta Rhymes – "Dangerous"; Wyclef Jean – "Gone till November"; Jay-Z – "Hard Knock Life (Ghetto Anthem)"; Lauryn Hill – "Lost Ones" | |
| 2000 | Eminem | "My Name Is" | Busta Rhymes – "Gimme Some More"; Q-Tip – "Vivrant Thing"; 2Pac – "Changes"; Will Smith – "Wild Wild West" | |
| 2001 | Eminem | "The Real Slim Shady" | Common – "The Light"; DMX – "Party Up (Up in Here)"; Mystikal – "Shake Ya Ass"; Nelly – "Country Grammar (Hot Shit)" | |
| 2002 | Missy Elliott | "Get Ur Freak On" | Afroman – "Because I Got High"; DMX – "Who We Be"; Jay-Z – "Izzo (H.O.V.A.)"; Nelly – "Ride wit Me" | |
| 2003 | Missy Elliott | "Scream a.k.a. Itchin'" | Charli Baltimore – "Diary"; Eve – "Satisfaction"; Foxy Brown – "Na Na Be Like"; Lauryn Hill – "Mystery of Iniquity" | |
| 2003 | Nelly | "Hot in Herre" | Eminem – "Without Me"; Jay-Z – "Song Cry"; Ludacris – "Rollout (My Business)"; Mystikal – "Bouncin' Back (Bumpin' Me Against the Wall)" | |
| 2004 | Missy Elliott | "Work It'" | Da Brat – "Got It Poppin'"; Lil' Kim – "Came Back For You"; MC Lyte – "Ride Wit' Me"; Queen Latifah – "Go Head" | |
| 2004 | Eminem | "Lose Yourself" | 50 Cent – "In da Club"; Joe Budden – "Pump It Up"; Ludacris – "Stand Up"; Sean Paul – "Get Busy" | |
| 2005 | Jay-Z | "99 Problems" | Eminem – "Just Lose It"; Kanye West – "Through the Wire"; Lloyd Banks – "On Fire"; Twista – "Overnight Celebrity" | |
| 2006 | Kanye West | "Gold Digger" | 50 Cent – "Disco Inferno"; Common – "Testify"; Eminem – "Mockingbird"; T.I. – "U Don't Know Me"; Ludacris – "Number One Spot" | |
| 2007 | T.I. | "What You Know" | Busta Rhymes – "Touch It"; Missy Elliott – "We Run This"; Lupe Fiasco – "Kick, Push"; Mos Def – "Undeniable" | |
| 2008 | Kanye West | "Stronger" | Common – "The People"; 50 Cent – "I Get Money"; Jay-Z – "Show Me What You Got"; T.I. – "Big Shit Poppin' (Do It)" | |
| 2009 | Lil Wayne | "A Milli" | Jay-Z – "Roc Boys (And the Winner Is)..."; Lupe Fiasco – "Paris, Tokyo"; Nas – "N.I.G.G.E.R. (The Slave and the Master)"; Snoop Dogg – "Sexual Eruption" | |
| 2010 | Jay-Z | "D.O.A. (Death of Auto-Tune)" | Eminem – "Beautiful"; Drake – "Best I Ever Had"; Kid Cudi – "Day 'n' Nite"; Mos Def – "Casa Bey" | |
| 2011 | Eminem | "Not Afraid" | Drake – "Over"; Ludacris – "How Low"; T.I. – "I'm Back"; Kanye West – "Power" | |

^{^[I]} Each year is linked to the article about the Grammy Awards held that year.

== Multiple wins ==
4 wins

- Eminem

3 wins

- Missy Elliott

2 wins

- LL Cool J
- Kanye West
- Will Smith
- Jay-Z

== Multiple nominations ==
8 nominations

- Eminem

7 nominations

- Jay-Z

5 nominations

- LL Cool J
- Busta Rhymes
- Missy Elliott

4 nominations

- Queen Latifah
- Ludacris
- Kanye West
- T.I.

3 nominations

- MC Hammer
- Coolio
- Will Smith
- Common
- Nelly
- 50 Cent

2 nominations

- Monie Love
- Sir Mix-a-lot
- Dr. Dre
- MC Lyte
- Snoop Dogg
- The Notorious B.I.G.
- 2Pac
- Nas
- Lauryn Hill
- DMX
- Mystikal
- Lupe Fiasco
- Mos Def
- Drake
