= For You (Prince album) =

Studio album by Prince
- Released: April 7, 1978
- Recorded: September 1977 – February 1978
- Studios: Sound 80 (Minneapolis, Minnesota); Record Plant (Sausalito, California); Sound Labs (Hollywood, California)
- Genres: Disco; rock; pop; funk; R&B
- Length: 33:14
- Label: Warner Bros.
- Producer: Prince

Prince chronology
For You (1978)	Prince (1979)

Singles from For You
- 1. "Soft and Wet" Released: June 7, 1978 (US, ZA, & BB); 2. "Just as Long as We're Together" Released: November 21, 1978 (US & CA)

For You is the debut studio album by the American singer-songwriter and musician Prince. It was released by Warner Bros. Records on April 7, 1978. All tracks were produced, arranged, composed, and performed by Prince. Prince started recording in September 1977 at Sound 80 in Minneapolis, Minnesota, where he had previously made a demo. Friend and producer David Rivkin (later known as David Z) provided advice and engineering assistance.

For You reached No. 163 on the Billboard 200 and No. 21 on the Billboard Soul chart. "Soft and Wet", the album's lead single, became a minor hit on the Billboard Hot 100, peaking at No. 92. However, it became a Top 20 hit on the Billboard Hot Soul Singles chart, peaking at No. 12. In 2016, after Prince's death, the album re-charted on the Billboard 200, reaching No. 138.

== Production ==
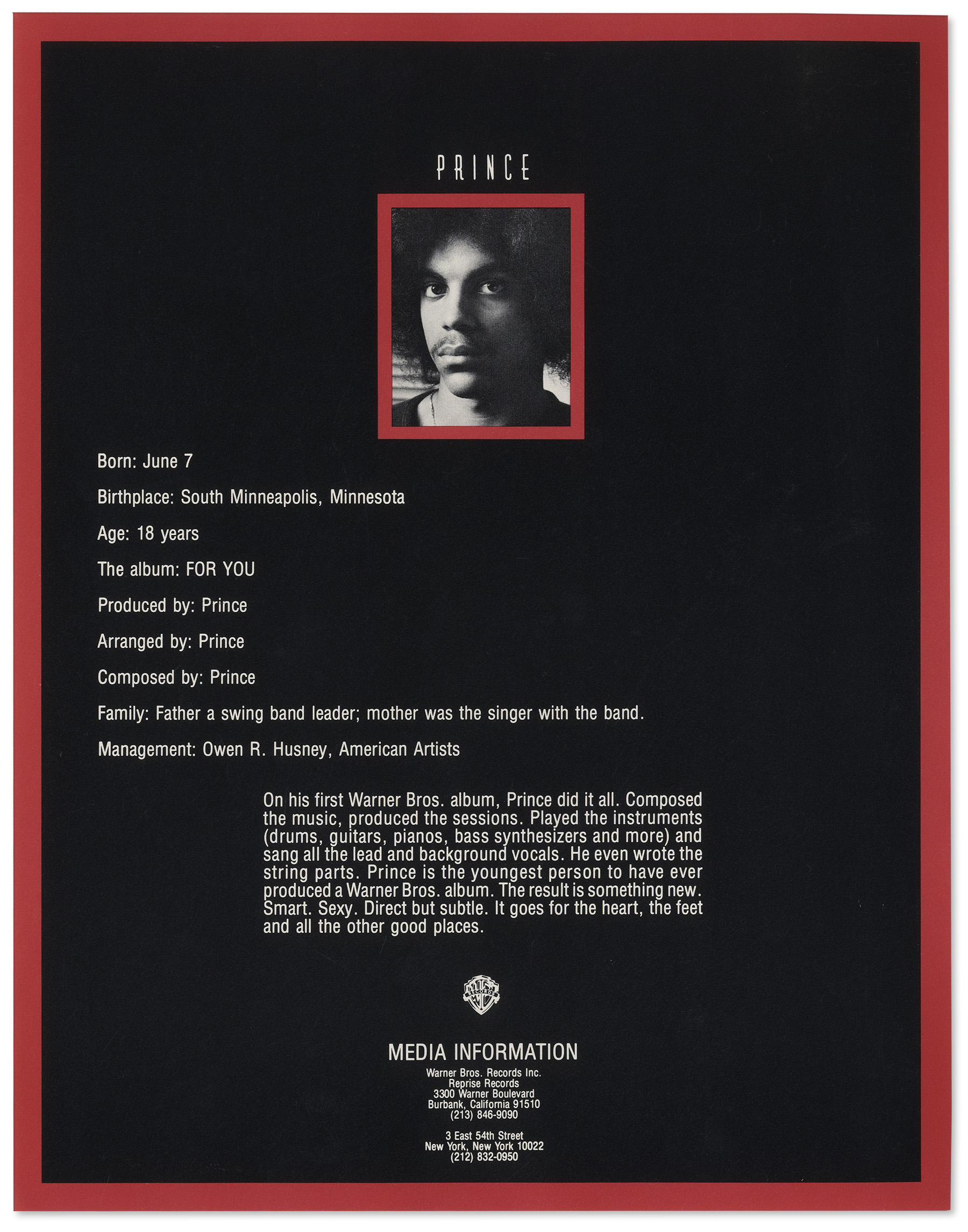
The one sheet published by Warner Bros. to promote For You (Note: Prince was in fact 19 years old when For You was released, not 18 as the sheet states.)

Prince started recording in September 1977 at Sound 80 in Minneapolis, Minnesota, where he had previously made a demo. Friend and producer David Rivkin (later known as David Z) provided advice and engineering assistance. Rivkin was being considered for the role of executive producer, but Warner Bros. instead chose Tommy Vicari, known for his work with Gino Vannelli. Vicari suggested taking the project to a studio in Los Angeles, but Prince's manager Owen Husney chose the Record Plant in Sausalito, California. Shifting the project to California, Prince, Vicari, Husney, and Husney's wife settled into an apartment in Mill Valley, California, with a view looking down at Sausalito and out to the San Francisco Bay.

Starting in October, the basic tracks were recorded over three months at the Record Plant. Vicari tried to exert his influence as producer but Prince shrugged off any advice that was contrary to his wishes. Prince worked obsessively on the project, singing all vocals and playing all instruments, including acoustic, electric, and bass guitar; acoustic and Fender Rhodes piano; synth bass; various keyboard synths by Oberheim, Moog, and ARP; orchestra bells (glockenspiel); drums and percussion. He used the Oberheim to provide the sound of a horn section, but with guitar lines layered into the mix. The basic tracks were finished in late December 1977. Husney later observed that Prince had drained Vicari during the recording process, such that Vicari was "heartbroken" because he had just been "treated like shit".

In January 1978, Prince and Vicari moved the project to engineer Armin Steiner's Sound Labs studio in Hollywood to begin overdubs and final mixing. Prince distanced himself further from Vicari, concentrating on laying down multiple vocal lines to create a polished commercial sound. Warner Bros. selected an art director to design the album cover but Prince booked his own photography session with Joe Gianetti, resulting in a head shot taken in a dark room with Prince's face lit by candlelight. Prince completed the final mixes on February 28. The total project cost $170,500—US$841,626 in 2025 dollars—three times the original budget. With all the work, including 46 vocal lines layered into the first track, Prince was exhausted. He later said that he was a "physical wreck" when he finished.

== Singles ==
"Soft and Wet", the album's lead single, became a minor hit on the US Billboard Hot 100, peaking at number 92. However, it became a top 20 hit on the Hot R&B/Hip-Hop Songs chart, peaking at number 12. The second single released from the album, "Just as Long as We're Together", reached number 91 on the R&B charts.

== Critical reception ==
Professional ratings
Review scores
Source	Rating
AllMusic	2/5 stars
Blender	2/5 stars
Christgau's Record Guide	B−
Entertainment Weekly	B−
The Guardian	4/5 stars
MusicHound	2.5/5
The Rolling Stone Album Guide	2.5/5 stars
Yahoo! Music	(favorable)

Reviewing in Christgau's Record Guide: Rock Albums of the Seventies (1981), Robert Christgau wrote, "Like most in-studio one-man bands, the nineteen-year-old kid who pieced this disco-rock-pop-funk concoction together has a weakness for the programmatic—lots of chops, not much challenge. But I like 'Baby,' about making one, and 'Soft and Wet,' ditto only he doesn't know it yet. And his falsetto beats Stevie Wonder's, not to mention Emitt Rhodes's."

== Commercial performance ==
On release in 1978, For You reached number 163 on the US Billboard 200 chart and number 21 on the Billboard R&B Albums chart. It went on to sell approximately two million copies worldwide. In 2016, after Prince's death, the album re-charted on the Billboard 200, reaching number 138. The album also reached number 200 on the French Albums Chart and number 156 on the UK Albums Chart, although it did not originally chart in those countries.

== Track listing ==
All tracks are written by Prince, except where noted.

Side one
No.	Title	Lyrics	Length
1.	"For You"		1:07
2.	"In Love"		3:37
3.	"Soft and Wet"	Prince; Chris Moon	3:02
4.	"Crazy You"		2:16
5.	"Just as Long as We're Together"		6:23
Total length:			16:25

"The Other Side"
No.	Title	Writer(s)	Length
6.	"Baby"		3:10
7.	"My Love is Forever"	Prince; Moon (uncredited)	4:10
8.	"So Blue"		4:28
9.	"I'm Yours"		5:01
Total length:			16:49 33:14

== Personnel ==
- Prince – lead and backing vocals (all tracks), electric guitars (2–3, 5–9), acoustic guitars (4, 6, 8–9), piano (6), Fender Rhodes piano (5–7), clavinet (3, 5, 9), ARP Pro Soloist (2–3, 5–7), ARP String Ensemble (2, 5), Minimoog (5–6), Polymoog (2–3, 7), Oberheim Four Voice (3, 6–7), bass guitar (2–3, 5–9), drums (3, 5–7, 9), Pollard Syndrums (2, 9), slapstick (3), wind chimes (4), glockenspiel (6), finger cymbals (4), handclaps (5), fingersnaps (5), water drums (4), bongos (5), congas (4–5), brush tap (8), bell tree (8), wood block (7), producer, arranger, engineer, dust cover design
- Patrice Rushen – synth programming (uncredited)
- Charles Veal – string arrangement on "Baby" (uncredited)

Technical

- Tommy Vicari – executive producer, engineer, remixer
- David Rivkin – vocal recording engineer (uncredited)
- Steve Fontano – assistant engineer
- Dave Roeder – assistant engineer
- Bernie Grundman – mastering (A&M)
- Jeff Farmakes – art direction (The Ad Company)
- Joe Giannetti – photography

== Charts ==
1978 weekly chart performance for For You
Chart (1978)	Peak position
US Billboard Top LPs & Tape	163
US Billboard Top Black Albums	21

2016 weekly chart performance for For You
Chart (2016)	Peak position
French Albums (SNEP)	200
UK Albums (Official Charts)	156
US Billboard 200	138
