= U Can't Touch This =

1990 song by MC Hammer

Single by MC Hammer

from the album Please Hammer Don't Hurt 'Em
- B-side: "Dancin' Machine"
- Released: April 1990
- Recorded: 1989
- Genre: Hip hop; pop rap
- Length: 4:16 (album version); 3:40 (radio edit)
- Label: Capitol
- Songwriters: Stanley Burrell; James Johnson; Alonzo Miller
- Producer: MC Hammer

MC Hammer singles chronology
"Dancin' Machine" (1989)	"U Can't Touch This" (1990)	"Have You Seen Her" (1990)

Music video
- "U Can't Touch This" on YouTube

"U Can't Touch This" is a song co-written, produced, and performed by American rapper MC Hammer. It was released in April 1990 by Capitol Records as the third single from his third album, Please Hammer Don't Hurt 'Em (1990), and has been considered his signature song. Rick James and Alonzo Miller also have songwriting credits, as the song samples the prominent opening riff of James's 1981 single "Super Freak". It has been used and referred to in many television shows, films, commercials, and other forms of media. The song has also received multiple awards and recognition. The accompanying music video was directed by Rupert Wainwright, featuring Hammer performing in his iconic Hammer pants.

The song won a Grammy Award for Best R&B Song and a Grammy Award for Best Rap Solo Performance. It is the first rap song to be nominated for a Grammy Award for Record of the Year at the 33rd Annual Grammy Awards in 1991, and the MTV Video Music Award for Best Rap Video and MTV Video Music Award for Best Dance Video at the 1990 MTV Video Music Awards. The song peaked at number one on the US Billboard Hot Black Singles chart and topped the charts of six other countries.

== Production ==
The song samples the prominent opening riff of the Rick James song "Super Freak", which is repeated throughout the recording. The lyrics describe Hammer as having "toured around the world, from London to The Bay" and as being "magic on the mic", which he says coincides with James's "beat that you can't touch". The lyrics "you can't touch this" and "Stop! Hammer time!" became pop culture catchphrases. Hammertime was later used as the title of a reality show starring Hammer on A&E during the summer of 2009.

The sample of "Super Freak", which forms the basis of the song, led James (and other performers on the original record) to file a lawsuit for copyright infringement. It was settled out of court, with Hammer agreeing to credit James as a songwriter, effectively granting him millions of dollars in royalties.

In late 1989, the song was first performed publicly on an episode of The Arsenio Hall Show.

== Critical reception ==
Bill Coleman from Billboard magazine commented, "A Rick James classic paired with Hammer's distinctive rhyme styling has added up to a deserved smash." Whitney Pastorek from Entertainment Weekly wrote, "The good-natured boast, laid over the hook of Rick James's 'Superfreak', proved irresistible. Hammer's hydraulic dance moves and outlandish fashions — harem pants and gold lamé, together at last! — were cartoonish". Ben Thompson from NME said, "Currently more popular than sliced bread in the US of A, MC Hammer updates one of the more favoured moments of the dreadful Rick James in a barrage of twiddly synths. The debt that Swingbeat owes to Landscape's 'Einstein a Go-Go' has yet to be fully investigated." The song secured a Grammy Award for Best R&B Song and a Grammy Award for Best Rap Solo Performance in 1991, a new category at the time, and the first rap song to be nominated for Grammy Award for Record of the Year.

=== Retrospective ===
In 1999, MTV's 100 Greatest Videos Ever Made included the song at number 71. In October 2000, VH1's 100 Greatest Dance Songs included it at number 88. In May 2001, VH1's 100 Greatest Videos included it at number 59. In August 2005, the song was certified gold. In December 2007, VH1's 100 Greatest Songs of the '90s included it at number 16. During 2008, it ranked as number 26 on VH1's 100 Greatest Songs of Hip Hop. In October 2005, Blender ranked the song at number 196 in their list of Greatest Songs Since You Were Born. In 2023, Time Out ranked "U Can't Touch This" number 22 in their The 100 Best Party Songs Ever Made. In March 2024, Forbes magazine ranked it number 35 in their list of The 50 Best Songs of the 1990s.

== Commercial performance ==
"U Can't Touch This" was a success, reaching number one on the US Billboard Hot Black Singles chart and number eight on the Billboard Hot 100. On the Hot 100, it debuted at number 27, which was the highest debut on the listing since 1985, when USA for Africa's "We Are the World" entered the chart at number 21. This was mainly due to the song's copious radio airplay in the weeks leading up to its release. The track also performed successfully in other parts of the world, peaking at number one in Australia, the Netherlands, New Zealand and Sweden. In the United Kingdom, it peaked at number three on the UK Singles Chart. The song was not initially released as a single, so more than 18 million copies of the album Please Hammer Don't Hurt 'Em were sold, gaining multi-platinum certification from the Recording Industry Association of America (RIAA).

== Music video ==
A music video, directed by English film and television director Rupert Wainwright, was produced to promote the single, showing Hammer's signature dances, including the "running man", "the bump", and the "Hammer dance", while wearing his iconic Hammer pants. In September 1990, the music video won a MTV Video Music Award for Best Rap Video and a MTV Video Music Award for Best Dance Video. It was also nominated for MTV Video Music Award for Best Male Video, Best Editing, and Best Choreography.

== Legacy ==
In 1992, a parody entitled "I Can't Watch This" was released by "Weird Al" Yankovic for his album Off the Deep End, with lyrics complaining about bad TV shows overlaid on the song's music track (and featuring samples of various commercials during the breakdowns).

Before the 1990 NFL season started, the Miami Dolphins parodied the song as "U Can't Touch Us".

Childersburg High School Principal Quentin Lee in Childersburg, Alabama created a parody video to "share some joy" and provide advice to students on handling the COVID-19 pandemic.

== Charts ==
=== Weekly charts ===
1990 weekly chart performance for "U Can't Touch This"
Chart (1990)	Peak position
Australia (ARIA)	1
Austria (Ö3 Austria Top 40)	5
Belgium (Ultratop 50 Flanders)	1
Canada Retail Singles (The Record)	1
Canada Top Singles (RPM)	8
Canada Dance/Urban (RPM)	1
Denmark (IFPI)	3
Europe (Eurochart Hot 100)	1
Finland (Suomen virallinen lista)	2
France (SNEP)	17
Ireland (IRMA)	3
Israel (Israeli Singles Chart)	4
Luxembourg (Radio Luxembourg)	5
Netherlands (Dutch Top 40)	1
Netherlands (Single Top 100)	1
New Zealand (Recorded Music NZ)	1
Norway (VG-lista)	6
Spain (AFYVE)	2
Sweden (Sverigetopplistan)	1
Switzerland (Schweizer Hitparade)	2
UK Singles (Official Charts)	3
US Billboard Hot 100	8
US 12-inch Singles Sales (Billboard)	2
US Dance Club Play (Billboard)	6
US Hot Black Singles (Billboard)	1
US Hot Rap Singles (Billboard)	2
US Cash Box Top 100	4
West Germany (GfK)	2

2008 weekly chart performance for "U Can't Touch This"
Chart (2008)	Peak position
Ukraine Airplay (TopHit)	68

2023–2024 weekly chart performance for "U Can't Touch This"
Chart (2023–2024)	Peak position
Kazakhstan Airplay (TopHit)	55
Latvia Airplay (TopHit)	176

=== Year-end charts ===
1990 year-end chart performance for "U Can't Touch This"
Chart (1990)	Position
Australia (ARIA)	2
Austria (Ö3 Austria Top 40)	29
Belgium (Ultratop)	6
Canada Top Singles (RPM)	70
Canada Dance/Urban (RPM)	4
Europe (Eurochart Hot 100)	8
Germany (Media Control)	17
Israel (Israeli Singles Chart)	33
Netherlands (Dutch Top 40)	6
Netherlands (Single Top 100)	4
New Zealand (RIANZ)	1
Sweden (Topplistan)	4
Switzerland (Schweizer Hitparade)	15
UK Singles (OCC)	15
US Billboard Hot 100	55
US 12-inch Singles Sales (Billboard)	11
US Hot R&B Singles (Billboard)	25
US Hot Rap Singles (Billboard)	22
US Cash Box Top 100	39

2024 year-end chart performance for "U Can't Touch This"
Chart (2024)	Position
Kazakhstan Airplay (TopHit)	151

=== Decade-end charts ===
Decade-end chart performance for "U Can't Touch This"
Chart (1990–1999)	Position
Canada (Nielsen SoundScan)	65

== Certifications and sales ==
Certifications for "U Can't Touch This"
Region	Certification	Certified units/sales
Australia (ARIA)	2× Platinum	140,000^{^}
Brazil (Pro-Música Brasil)	Gold	30,000^{‡}
Canada (Music Canada)	Gold	50,000^{^}
Denmark (IFPI Danmark)	Gold	45,000^{‡}
France	—	130,000
Germany (BVMI)	Gold	250,000^{^}
Netherlands (NVPI)	Gold	75,000^{^}
New Zealand (RMNZ)	2× Platinum	60,000^{‡}
Spain (Promusicae)	Gold	30,000^{‡}
Sweden (GLF)	Gold	25,000^{^}
United Kingdom (BPI)	Platinum	600,000^{‡}
United States (RIAA)	4× Platinum	4,000,000^{‡}
^{*} Sales figures based on certification alone.^{^} Shipments figures based on certification alone.^{‡} Sales+streaming figures based on certification alone.

== Release history ==
Release dates and formats for "U Can't Touch This"
Region	Date	Format(s)	Label(s)	Ref.
United States	April 1990	12-inch vinyl	Capitol	
United Kingdom	May 28, 1990	7-inch vinyl; 12-inch vinyl; CD	Capitol	
Germany	June 1, 1990	7-inch vinyl; 12-inch vinyl; CD	Capitol	
Australia	June 11, 1990	7-inch vinyl; 12-inch vinyl; cassette	Capitol	
United Kingdom	June 18, 1990	Cassette	Capitol	
Japan	June 27, 1990	Mini-CD	Capitol	

== See also ==
- "Ice Ice Baby", 1990 hit rap song sampling 1981's "Under Pressure"
- "Jingle Bells" / "U Can't Touch This", Crazy Frog cover
