= Soft and Wet =

- U.S. 7" single

Single by Prince

from the album For You
- B-side: "So Blue"
- Released: June 7, 1978
- Recorded: October–December 1977
- Genre: R&B; synth-funk; funk
- Length: 3:01
- Label: Warner Bros.
- Songwriters: Prince; Chris Moon
- Producer: Prince

Prince singles chronology
"Soft and Wet" (1978)	"Just as Long as We're Together" (1978)

"Soft and Wet" is a song performed by American musician Prince. It was his first solo single, released on June 7, 1978, his 20th birthday, from his debut album, For You. The track contains drums, synthesized and vocalized bass, and synthesizers. The lyrics were co-written by Chris Moon, the producer-songwriter-engineer who discovered Prince in Minneapolis. The song was released in Barbados, South Africa, and the United States by Warner Bros. Records. There also exists a promotional, not-for-sale version of the 7" vinyl single that contains both a mono version and stereo version of the song. The song peaked at 92 on the Billboard Hot 100 on November 25, 1978, after two weeks on the chart.

A disco mix of the song served as the B-side to a 12" single vinyl that also contained a disco mix of the Prince song "Just as Long as We're Together".

== Track listing ==
- A. "Soft and Wet" – 3:01
- B. "So Blue" – 4:26

== Personnel ==
- Prince – lead and backing vocals, "singing bass", electric guitars, clavinet, ARP Pro Soloist, Minimoog, Polymoog, Oberheim Four Voice, drums, slapsticks
- Patrice Rushen – synth programming (uncredited)

== Charts ==
Chart performance for "Soft and Wet"
Chart (1978)	Peak position
US Billboard Hot 100	92
US Billboard Hot Soul Singles	12
