= Parade Tour =

1986 concert tour by Prince

- Tour by Prince and The Revolution
- Poster to the concert in Brussels, Belgium
- Location: Asia; Europe; North America
- Associated album: Parade; Around the World in a Day
- Start date: March 3, 1986
- End date: September 9, 1986
- Legs: 3
- No. of shows: 30

Prince and The Revolution concert chronology
- Purple Rain Tour (1984–85); Parade Tour (1986); Sign o' the Times Tour (1987)

The Parade Tour (also called the Under the Cherry Moon Tour) was a concert tour by American recording artist Prince in support of Prince and The Revolution's eighth studio album Parade and his 1986 film Under the Cherry Moon. The Hit n Run Tour was not a full scale American tour, but a string of concerts that was dubbed "Hit n Run" by Prince's manager. Most of those shows were announced days or hours before the actual concert took place. The Parade Tour marked the first full tour of Europe by Prince. It also saw the expanded Revolution line-up and featured Sheila E. and her band as an opening act for most shows.

== History ==
The American leg of the tour is called the Hit n Run Tour. The Parade Tour marked the only tour of the expanded Revolution as most of the members of the defunct The Family band were absorbed into Prince's band, dubbed by Eric Leeds as "The Counter-Revolution". The band's expansion became a source of tension, as some of the original members were unhappy with the new additions, especially of the non-instrument playing dancers, Wally Safford and Greg Brooks, with Brown Mark remarking "I was [put] behind the piano, next to Bobby Z [standing] behind three guys that used to be bodyguards. I started feeling a little underappreciated." Wendy was bothered that her twin sister Susannah was now in the band, saying "I shared a womb with this person, do I have to share a stage?" Furthermore, Brown Mark, Wendy and Lisa felt that Prince was turning the band into more of an R&B/funk and jazz/soul band, moving away from the pop/rock and orchestral/classical music that Prince had moved toward with his last three albums.

Right before the Parade Tour was scheduled to start overseas, Brown Mark, Wendy, and Lisa threatened to quit. In fact Bobby Z. literally caught Wendy and Lisa at the airport and begged them to stay for the tour. Eventually, all three were convinced to ride it out. But as the tour ended, it became clear that this would be the end of the group, and these were their final performances together. On the final night in Yokohama, Japan, Prince uncharacteristically smashed up all of his guitars after a final encore of "Purple Rain".

During the British tour, Prince was joined on stage by Ronnie Wood on guitar and Sting on bass. They performed a cover version of The Rolling Stones track "Miss You"; after the performance Prince said "I wish I wrote that". Following the tour, a bootleg was released via the official British fan club called Salvador Dalí EP which featured a recording of the performance of "Miss You".

Shortly after the Parade Tour in October 1986, The Revolution was disbanded, with Prince firing Wendy and Lisa, replacing Bobby Z. with Sheila E., and Brown Mark quitting.

== The band ==
- Prince: Lead vocals, guitar, tambourine, and Hammond organ
- Wendy Melvoin: Guitar
- Miko Weaver: Guitar
- Brown Mark: Bass
- Lisa Coleman: Keyboards
- Matt Fink: Keyboards
- Bobby Z: Drums
- Eric Leeds: Tenor Saxophone and concert flute
- Atlanta Bliss: Trumpet
- Susannah Melvoin: Backing vocals
- Jerome Benton, Wally Safford and Greg Brooks (known as The Bodyguards): Dancers and vocals

== Typical set list ==
=== Hit n Run ===
1. "Around the World in a Day"
2. "Christopher Tracy's Parade"
3. "New Position"
4. "I Wonder U"
5. "Raspberry Beret"
6. "Alexa de Paris"
7. "Controversy"
8. "Mutiny"
9. "Dream Factory"
10. "Holly Rock"
11. "(How Much Is) That Doggie in the Window?" / "Lady Cab Driver"
12. "Automatic"
13. "D.M.S.R."
14. "The Dance Electric"
15. "Under the Cherry Moon"
16. "Anotherloverholenyohead"
17. "Soft and Wet"
18. "I Wanna Be Your Lover"
19. "Head"
20. "Pop Life"
21. "Girls & Boys"
22. "Life Can Be So Nice"
23. "Purple Rain"
24. "Whole Lotta Shakin' Goin On"
25. "Mountains"
26. "A Love Bizarre"
27. "America"
28. "Kiss"

=== Parade ===
1. "Around the World in a Day"
2. "Christopher Tracy's Parade"
3. "New Position"
4. "I Wonder U"
5. "Raspberry Beret"
6. "Delirious"
7. "Controversy"
8. "A Love Bizarre"
9. "Do Me, Baby"
10. "(How Much Is) That Doggie in the Window?" / "Lady Cab Driver"
11. "Automatic"
12. "D.M.S.R."
13. "When Doves Cry"
14. "Under the Cherry Moon"
15. "Anotherloverholenyohead"
16. "17 Days"
17. "Head"
18. "Pop Life"
19. "Girls & Boys"
20. "Life Can Be So Nice"
21. "1999"
22. "Mountains"
23. "Kiss"
24. "Purple Rain"

Alterations

- "Mutiny", "It's Gonna Be a Beautiful Night", "Do U Lie?", "Condition of the Heart", "The Ladder", "♥ or $", and "America" would be played on some shows.
- The Paris performance of "It's Gonna Be a Beautiful Night" was recorded and overdubbed before being released on the Sign o' the Times album.

== Tour dates ==
List of 1986 concerts
Date	City	Country	Venue
March 3, 1986	Minneapolis	United States	First Avenue
April 3, 1986	Boston	United States	Metro
May 23, 1986	San Francisco	United States	Warfield Theatre
May 30, 1986	Los Angeles	United States	Wiltern Theatre
June 6, 1986	Detroit	United States	Masonic Temple Auditorium
June 7, 1986	Detroit	United States	Cobo Arena
June 10, 1986	Louisville	United States	Freedom Hall
July 1, 1986	Sheridan	United States	Sheridan Convention Center
July 3, 1986	Denver	United States	McNichols Arena
August 2, 1986	New York City	United States	Madison Square Garden
August 3, 1986	New York City	United States	Madison Square Garden
August 12, 1986	London	England	Wembley Arena
August 13, 1986	London	England	Wembley Arena
August 14, 1986	London	England	Wembley Arena
August 17, 1986	Rotterdam	Netherlands	Rotterdam Ahoy Sportpaleis
August 18, 1986	Rotterdam	Netherlands	Rotterdam Ahoy Sportpaleis
August 19, 1986	Rotterdam	Netherlands	Rotterdam Ahoy Sportpaleis
August 21, 1986	Copenhagen	Denmark	Valby-Hallen
August 22, 1986	Stockholm	Sweden	Isstadion
~~August 24, 1986~~	Amsterdam	Netherlands	Jaap Eden Hall
August 25, 1986	Paris	France	Le Zénith
August 26, 1986	Frankfurt	West Germany	Eissporthalle Frankfurt
August 27, 1986	Brussels	Belgium	Forest National
August 29, 1986	Essen	West Germany	Grugahalle
August 30, 1986	Hamburg	West Germany	Alsterdorfer Sporthalle
August 31, 1986	Hamburg	West Germany	Alsterdorfer Sporthalle
September 5, 1986	Osaka	Japan	Osaka-jō Hall
September 6, 1986	Osaka	Japan	Osaka-jō Hall
September 8, 1986	Yokohama	Japan	Yokohama Stadium
September 9, 1986	Yokohama	Japan	Yokohama Stadium

Notes

- The Detroit show on June 6, at Masonic Temple Auditorium was professionally recorded but never released, with the performance of "Anotherloverholenyohead" used as a promo video for the song, played on MTV.
