= Mountains (Prince song) =

- US 7" single

Single by Prince and The Revolution

from the album Parade
- B-side: "Alexa de Paris"
- Released: May 7, 1986
- Recorded: November 30, 1985
- Studio: Washington Avenue Warehouse (Minneapolis)
- Genre: Synth-pop; neo-psychedelia; funk-pop
- Length: 3:58 (album/7" version); 10:03 (extended version)
- Label: Paisley Park / Warner Bros.
- Songwriters: Prince; Lisa Coleman; Wendy Melvoin
- Producers: Prince and The Revolution

Prince and The Revolution singles chronology
"Kiss" (1986)	"Mountains" (1986)	"Anotherloverholenyohead" (1986)

"Mountains" is a 1986 song by American musician Prince and The Revolution, from his eighth album, Parade (1986), and the soundtrack to the film Under the Cherry Moon. It was written by The Revolution members Wendy & Lisa together with Prince. The extended 12" single version of the song runs nearly ten minutes. It reached number 23 in the US but only 45 in the UK. The B-side was the instrumental "Alexa de Paris", one of the few tracks from this project featuring a guitar solo. Both songs appear in the film Under the Cherry Moon, with the video for "Mountains" playing as the credits roll. The version shown on MTV to promote the single was in color as opposed to the film's black-and-white version.

"Mountains" was often performed in his live concerts. A music video, directed by Prince was released in April 1986.

== Track listings ==
- 7-inch single
1. "Mountains" – 3:58
2. "Alexa de Paris" – 3:20
- 12-inch single
1. "Mountains" (Extended Version) – 10:03
2. "Alexa de Paris" (Extended Version) – 4:54

== Personnel ==
Credits from Duane Tudahl, Benoît Clerc, and Guitarcloud

- Prince – lead and backing vocals, electric guitar
- Lisa Coleman – synthesizers, backing vocals
- Wendy Melvoin – electric guitar, backing vocals
- Dr. Fink – synthesizers
- Brown Mark – bass guitar, backing vocals
- Bobby Z. – Simmons SDSV, Linn LM-1
- Eric Leeds – saxophone
- Atlanta Bliss – trumpet
- Miko Weaver – electric guitar
- Clare Fischer – orchestral arrangements

== Charts ==
Chart performance for "Mountains"
Chart (1986)	Peak position
Australia (Kent Music Report)	45
Belgium (Ultratop 50 Flanders)	34
Finland (Suomen virallinen lista)	21
Luxembourg (Radio Luxembourg)	11
Netherlands (Dutch Top 40)	20
Netherlands (Single Top 100)	16
New Zealand (Recorded Music NZ)	37
UK Singles (OCC)	45
US Billboard Hot 100	23
US Hot Black Singles (Billboard)	15
US Cashbox Top 100	19
West Germany (GfK)	32
