= Sign o' the Times =

Studio album by Prince
- Released: March 31, 1987
- Recorded: July 1984 (Note: Basic tracking for "Slow Love".); March 1986 – January 1987
- Studios: Lake Minnetonka home (Minnetonka); Galpin Boulevard home (Chanhassen); Washington Avenue Warehouse (Edina); Sunset Sound Recorders; Ocean Way Recording (Hollywood); Monterey Sound (Glendale); Dierks Studio Mobile Trucks (Paris)
- Genres: R&B; funk; soul; rock; avant-pop
- Length: 80:06
- Labels: Paisley Park; Warner Bros.
- Producer: Prince

Prince chronology
Parade (1986)	Sign o' the Times (1987)	Lovesexy (1988)

Singles from Sign o' the Times
- 1. "Sign o' the Times" Released: February 18, 1987; 2. "If I Was Your Girlfriend" Released: May 6, 1987; 3. "U Got the Look" Released: July 14, 1987; 4. "I Could Never Take the Place of Your Man" Released: November 3, 1987

Sign o' the Times (stylized as Sign "☮︎" the Times) is the ninth studio album by the American singer and songwriter Prince. It was released on March 31, 1987, as a double album by Paisley Park Records and Warner Bros. Records. The album is the follow-up to Parade and is Prince's first solo album following his disbanding of the Revolution. The album's songs were largely recorded from 1986 to 1987 in sessions for releases Prince ultimately aborted: Dream Factory, the pseudonymous Camille, and finally the triple album Crystal Ball. Prince eventually compromised with label executives and shortened the length of the release to a double album.

Sign o' the Times is a drastic departure from Prince's previous works, taking inspiration from social issues and spirituality. An R&B album, the album takes influence from avant-pop and hip hop, which was emerging in mainstream music. Many of the drum sounds on the album came from the Linn LM-1 drum machine, and Prince used the Fairlight CMI synthesizer to replace other instruments. Four songs contain higher-pitched vocals to represent Prince's alter ego "Camille". The album's music touches on funk, soul, psychedelic pop, electro, and rock.

Despite being Prince's fifth album in five years, Sign o' the Times reached the top 10 of the Billboard 200 and spawned three top 10 hits on the Billboard Hot 100: the title track and lead single "Sign o' the Times", "U Got the Look" and "I Could Never Take the Place of Your Man". Besides these three, "If I Was Your Girlfriend" was also released as a single. A concert film of the same name was released to promote the album. The album was a huge critical success and is certified platinum in the US. Following Prince's death in 2016, it re-entered the Billboard 200 at number 20.

Sign o' the Times is one of the most critically acclaimed albums in popular music, widely being regarded as Prince's best album, ahead of Purple Rain (1984). It was voted the best album of 1987 in the Pazz & Jop critics poll and was nominated for Album of the Year at the 30th Grammy Awards. Often regarded as a masterpiece, some critics have praised Sign o' the Times as the best album of the 1980s. It is a frequent inclusion in lists of the greatest albums of all time and was inducted into the Grammy Hall of Fame in 2017.

== Background ==
Prince's sixth studio album, Purple Rain (1984), dominated American pop culture for nearly the entirety of 1984. Prince and the Revolution followed it with the psychedelic album Around The World In A Day (1985) and Parade the following year; the former topped the Billboard 200 whilst the latter was critically well received. However, Prince's record company and most of his newer fans gained from the success of Purple Rain wanted a second Purple Rain. Further issues were that much of his black audience thought he was becoming "too white" and sections of the public were uncomfortable with his prurience and sexual ambiguity.

Unlike the three previous band albums, Dream Factory included input from the band members and lead vocals by Wendy & Lisa. Prince feared that he was losing control, leading to the project to be abandoned. The Camille project saw Prince create an androgynous persona primarily singing in a higher, female-sounding voice. With the dismissal of the Revolution, Prince consolidated material from both shelved albums, along with some new songs, into a three-LP album to be titled Crystal Ball. Warner Bros. balked at the idea of trying to sell a triple album and forced Prince to trim it down to a double album. Prince cut seven tracks, and also reformulated the album to accommodate the newly added title track.

== Production and composition ==
=== Recording ===
As with many of Prince's 1980s albums, this album features extensive use of the Linn LM-1 drum machine on most songs. In addition, many songs on the album (such as "If I Was Your Girlfriend") feature minimal instrumentation, and use of the Fairlight CMI, a then state-of-the-art synthesizer also containing a digital sampler. Unlike many of his contemporaries, Prince used the stock sounds of the Fairlight to create the title track. Four of the album's standout songs, "Housequake", "Strange Relationship", "U Got the Look" with Sheena Easton, and "If I Was Your Girlfriend" use pitch-shifted vocals to create a higher voice, ostensibly the voice of "Camille", Prince's alter ego of this era.

Prince was known for recording his vocals in the control room area of the studio. Typically, in the recording process, a vocalist records in the recording booth, separated from the control room by a window or soundproof door. To have privacy during the vocal recording process, Prince usually asked his engineer, Susan Rogers, to leave the room. Rogers recalls:

We'd get the track halfway or three-quarters of the way there and then set him up with a microphone in the control room. He'd have certain tracks on the multi-track that he would use and he'd do the vocal completely alone. I think that was the only way he could really get the performance.

On some occasions, Prince recorded vocals with his back to her. Rogers monitored the vocals with a pair of headphones so Prince's recording microphone would not pick up the speakers she would usually have used. Prince typically used a Sennheiser 441 dynamic microphone (recommended to him by Stevie Nicks) for recording vocals at this stage in his career. Susan Rogers also recalled the speed of Prince's creative process, saying "[the] songs came out like a sneeze, one track after the next, after the next." She also noticed a problem with the sound desk—which had been newly installed—during the recording of "The Ballad of Dorothy Parker", which resulted in a sound matching the "underwater dream state" of the song.

Although Sign o' the Times was regarded by some as less polished than his earlier efforts (Spin said the album sounded like outtakes, "except nobody else's outtakes would sound so strong, rock so hard, swing so free") Prince pointed out that he (and his record company) "spent more time and money" on Sign o' the Times than anything he had ever done, adding that "[much] more work went into it."

=== Music and lyrics ===
Described by Rolling Stone as "the most expansive R&B record" of the 1980s, Sign o' the Times encompasses a wide range of styles. Music critic Stephen Thomas Erlewine said Prince utilizes a palette of genres, "from bare-bones electro-funk and smooth soul to pseudo-psychedelic pop and crunching hard rock, touching on gospel, blues, and folk along the way". Similarly, writer and Prince scholar Ben Greenman observes "spooky political R&B, full-throated psychedelic pop, bone-rattling skeletal funk, and pocket soul so gentle and nuanced you could almost call it folk". According to music journalist Touré, the album is Prince's foray into soul more than anything, while writer and composer Paul Grimstad deemed the record an example of avant-pop. Prince's use of the drum machine throughout the album is an example of "authentic rock music [made] with computers", Yuzima Philip wrote in Observer. In the opinion of Star Tribune journalist Jon Bream, the music can be described as an absolute "balance of everything" the artist had explored stylistically up to that point, including "grinding funk, catchy pop, anthemic rock, tender balladry". The album also delves into hip hop, which was emerging into the mainstream. According to Nelson George, Prince was keenly aware that hip-hop was gaining more exposure and influencing contemporary music.

Regarding the themes explored throughout the album, MTV News writer Hanif Abdurraqib said it functions "as a political action" and "that the politics are not those of solutions, but those of survival in the face of that which you might not survive for much longer. The politics of survival say that we may dance in the face of a coming apocalypse. We may, in the face of a coming apocalypse, go to bed with someone we love or someone we didn't know before the night started. We may play in the streets, or fantasize about a new world to run into. On Sign 'O' The Times, after laying out the terrifying landscape, Prince pushes the landscape aside, lays out all of our options for survival on a table, and tells us to take our pick."

George also pointed to carnality and spirituality being a common theme on Sign o' the Times. "Forever in My Life" was noted as an example, where Prince combines both sexuality and piety. "Hot Thing" and "It" were described as aggressively sexual, but through the "oddly-pitched" sounds, the songs resonate with spiritual themes like human connection and transcendence. The title track and lead single, "Sign o' the Times", discusses gang violence and the crack cocaine epidemic. "The Cross" stands out on the album as a Christian rock song described as raw and emotional, as Prince preaches about Jesus. The song was also noted for having a Eastern-influenced sound.

=== Cover ===
The cover of the album was shot by photographer Jeff Katz, who also served as Prince's photographer during the mid-80s, and had shot the covers of Prince's The Family album in 1985, and Parade in 1986. The shoot was held at a warehouse in Eden Prairie, Minnesota close to where Paisley Park Studios was set up later. The cover featured a drum set on top of the front end of a 1971 Pontiac Grand Prix, bouquets, a plasma globe and a guitar, with Prince's face in the foreground in a blur. The props were taken from Prince's home and studio, and the backdrop borrowed from a stage production of the musical Guys and Dolls.

== Release ==
Sign o' the Times was released on March 30, 1987, in the United Kingdom, and one day later in the United States and France. It peaked at number six on the Billboard 200, reached the top 10 in Austria, France, New Zealand, Norway, Sweden, and the UK, and reached number one in Switzerland. The singles "Sign o' the Times", "U Got the Look" and "I Could Never Take the Place of Your Man" reached number three, two and ten on the Billboard Hot 100, respectively. Four months after its release, the album was certified platinum by the Recording Industry Association of America (RIAA). Following Prince's death in 2016, the album re-charted on the Billboard 200 at number 20.

Though Sign o' the Times is regarded as one of Prince's best albums, it did not sell as well as his three preceding releases. According to Mark Lindores, writing for Classic Pop, Prince's commercial stock had declined significantly following the underperformance of Around The World In A Day and Parade, both of which shifted from the "pulsing electro-rock and soaring anthems" of Purple Rain in favor of psychedelic pop and "Eurocentric, jazz-inflected funk", respectively. The underwhelming sales of the album is also likely attributed to it being Prince's fifth album in five years and there not being a supporting tour in the US (he also cancelled the UK dates, meaning the tour only reached mainland Europe).

=== Reissues ===
The album was reissued in Remastered, Deluxe and Super Deluxe editions on September 25, 2020. The Super Deluxe edition contains nine discs with a remaster of the original album, all 13 single, maxi-single and B-side tracks, 45 previously unreleased tracks, and two complete live recordings of the Sign o' the Times Tour: one audio performance recorded at Stadion Galgenwaard in Utrecht, Netherlands, on June 20, 1987, and one video performance shot at Paisley Park on December 31, 1987. In addition, a 7" vinyl singles box set limited to 1,987 units was released, containing remastered audio for all four official 7" singles released in 1987, as well as the two official Warner Records promo singles and a brand new 7" single comprising two versions of the previously unreleased track "Witness 4 the Prosecution".

== Critical reception ==
Sign o' the Times became Prince's most critically acclaimed record. Reviewing for Spin in 1987, Bart Bull said Prince's loosely organized songs are "genius" rather than indulgent and that, although there is no song as groundbreaking as "Girls & Boys", "nobody else's outtakes would sound so strong, rock so hard, swing so free." Don McLeese of the Chicago Sun-Times hailed it as "a one-man show, a tour de force, and a confirmation that pop's former prodigy has come of age." Writing for The Village Voice, Robert Christgau said the album is not a "formal breakthrough" but rather "the most gifted pop musician of his generation proving what a motherfucker he is for two discs start to finish." He particularly praised Prince's "one-man band tricks" and multi-tracked vocals, which he said "make Stevie Wonder sound like a struggling ventriloquist" and express real emotions: "The objects of his desire are also objects of interest, affection, and respect. Some of them he may not even fuck."

Sign o' the Times was nominated for Album of the Year at the 30th Grammy Awards, losing to U2's The Joshua Tree (1987). It was voted as the best album of 1987 in The Village Voice's Pazz & Jop critics' poll. According to Christgau, the poll's creator, the album was "easily the biggest winner" in the poll's history and "established Prince as the greatest rock and roll musician of the era—as singer-guitarist-hooksmith-beatmaster, he has no peer." The title track "Sign o' the Times" was named the best single of 1987 in the poll, while "I Could Never Take the Place of Your Man" and "U Got the Look" were also voted within the top 10. The album also ranked second among "Albums of the Year" for 1987 in the annual NME critics' poll, and the title track ranked number one among songs. In an interview in December 1989, Robert Smith of the Cure cited Sign o' the Times amongst the best things about the 1980s.

== Reappraisal and legacy ==
Professional ratings
Retrospective professional ratings
Aggregate scores
Source	Rating
Metacritic	99/100 (deluxe edition)
Review scores
Source	Rating
AllMusic	5/5 stars
Blender	5/5 stars
Christgau's Record Guide	A+
Encyclopedia of Popular Music	5/5 stars
Entertainment Weekly	A
The Guardian	5/5 stars
Pitchfork	10/10
Q	5/5 stars
Rolling Stone	5/5 stars
Spin Alternative Record Guide	10/10

In the decades that followed, Sign o' the Times has been regarded by critics as Prince's best album and is often hailed as a masterpiece. Some critics have also praised it as the best album of the 1980s. In a retrospective review, John McKie of BBC News cited it as "one of the most acclaimed albums of the second half of the 20th century" and a "masterpiece – encompassing all of [Prince's] musical personas: bedroom balladeer; penitent Christian; one-track-mind loverman; modern-day Basie-style bandleader; whimsical storyteller; meticulous orchestrator, guitar-wielding axeman and pop craftsman." Simon Price deemed it Prince's best album, as did Michaelangelo Matos, who wrote in The Rolling Stone Album Guide (2004) that it was "the most complete example of his artistry's breadth, and arguably the finest album of the 1980s". Matos also believed it was "the last classic R&B album prior to hip hop's takeover of black music and the final four-sided blockbuster of the vinyl era".

According to journalist Kristen Pyszczyk, "critics tend to be pretty evenly divided over Prince's best album: about half will go for Purple Rain, and the rest usually vouch for Sign o' the Times, a double album sometimes regarded as Prince's magnum opus." Kenneth Partridge of Billboard regarded Sign o' the Times as the album that broke the theory of Prince needing the Revolution to "keep him in check" and, like other critics, described the album as a "masterpiece". In a Pitchfork review, Nelson George regarded the artistry in Sign o' the Times as Prince's peak and that, despite the "dated" production, "the scope of the songs, the musicianship, and overall arrangements are just too glorious to nitpick." He concluded that the restless power of the album saves it from being formulaic or complacent: "All these years later, it’s still a vibrant thing, the product of a great artist at the height of his power."

Writing in The Brooklyn Rail, Grimstad said that Sign o' the Times is "to be included with other double sets that actually cohere (the White Album, The Basement Tapes, Something/Anything?). Proves there is no limit to what [Prince] can do." In a BBC Music review, Daryl Easlea also compared the record to the Beatles' best work, saying "Although Sign ‘O’ The Times didn't rival his commercial sales peak of Purple Rain, it is his White Album". He also regarded Prince's Sign o' the Times era as one of the greatest eras in popular music: "This, and the supporting concert film [Sign o' the Times] remain one of the most scintillating documents of an artist at the summit of their powers... when you listen again to Sign 'O' The Times, you realise why Prince was routinely labelled a genius in the late 80s." Keith Harris of Blender called Sign o' the Times a "masterpiece" and commented that "never has [Prince's] curiosity about women strayed into so many unpredictable corners", while Slant Magazine's Eric Henderson deemed it a "double-disc blowout of sweat, funk, and raw, concentrated talent".

Sign o' the Times has appeared on publications' lists and polls of the greatest albums. In 1989, Time Out magazine ranked Sign o' the Times as the greatest album of all time. The album was ranked number 16 on the New Musical Express list of the All Time Top 100 Albums, third in Hot Press magazine's list of the 100 Best Albums of All Time, and number 35 on VH1's 100 Greatest Albums. The album was also placed 8th on Nieuwe Revu's Top 100 Albums of All Time. The Times listed Sign o' the Times as the 29th greatest album of all time. It was voted number 19 in the third edition of Colin Larkin's All Time Top 1000 Albums (2000). In 2003, the album was ranked number 93 on Rolling Stone's list of The 500 Greatest Albums of All Time, maintaining the rank in the 2012 revision and moving up to number 45 in the 2020 reboot of the list. In 2006, Q magazine placed the album at number 12 in its list of "40 Best Albums of the '80s". In 2012, Slant Magazine listed the album at number 11 on its list of "Best Albums of the 1980s", calling it "Prince's most varied album and his most self-consciously auteurish". The album ranked number 51 among the Apple Music 100 Best Albums in 2024. The same year, Paste magazine ranked Sign 'o' the Times number 4 on its list of the greatest albums of all-time. In 2017, Sign o' the Times was inducted into the Grammy Hall of Fame. In 2020, Kirk Johnson asked Prince’s fans via social media which song should be re-recorded by his former band members, and "The Cross" was selected.

== Track listing ==
=== Original album ===
All tracks are written by Prince, except where noted.

Record one: Side one
No.	Title	Length
1.	"Sign o' the Times"	5:02
2.	"Play in the Sunshine"	5:05
3.	"Housequake"	4:38
4.	"The Ballad of Dorothy Parker"	4:04
Total length:		18:49

Record one: Side two
No.	Title	Writer(s)	Length
1.	"It"		5:10
2.	"Starfish and Coffee"	Prince; Susannah Melvoin	2:51
3.	"Slow Love"	Prince; Carole Davis	4:18
4.	"Hot Thing"		5:39
5.	"Forever in My Life"		3:38
Total length:			21:36

Record two: Side three
No.	Title	Length
1.	"U Got the Look" (features uncredited vocals by Sheena Easton)	3:58
2.	"If I Was Your Girlfriend"	4:54
3.	"Strange Relationship"	4:04
4.	"I Could Never Take the Place of Your Man"	6:31
Total length:		19:27

Record two: Side four
No.	Title	Writer(s)	Length
1.	"The Cross"		4:46
2.	"It's Gonna Be a Beautiful Night"	Prince; Doctor Fink; Eric Leeds	8:59
3.	"Adore"		6:29
Total length:			20:14 80:06

=== Remastered, deluxe and super deluxe editions ===
The Remastered edition contains a remaster of the original album (discs one and two). The Deluxe edition contains the remaster and a third disc with all the single and maxi-single mixes as well as the B-sides. The Super Deluxe edition contains six additional discs: Three of them contain 45 previously unissued studio tracks, two discs contain the live audio concert recordings of the Sign o' the Times Tour at stadium Galgenwaard in Utrecht, The Netherlands, and the last disc is a DVD with the live video concert recordings of the New Year's Eve show at Paisley Park, that has been bootlegged prior to this release.

The albums were also issued on vinyl in a 2 LP, 2 LP peach vinyl, 4 LP and 13 LP + DVD set and are available on all digital download and streaming services. The video content is exclusive to the physical DVD and does not appear on digital download or streaming versions of the Super Deluxe Edition set. Released on September 25, 2020, Pitchfork rated the Super Deluxe version a 10 out of 10 and named it Best New Reissue.

All songs written by Prince, except where noted.

CD 1 / LP 1: Remastered
No.	Title	Writer(s)	Length
1.	"Sign o' the Times"		4:57
2.	"Play in the Sunshine"		5:06
3.	"Housequake"		4:40
4.	"The Ballad of Dorothy Parker"		4:03
5.	"It"		5:10
6.	"Starfish and Coffee"	Prince; Melvoin	2:50
7.	"Slow Love"	Prince; Davis	4:22
8.	"Hot Thing"		5:39
9.	"Forever in My Life"		3:32
Total length:			40:19

CD 2 / LP 2: Remastered
No.	Title	Writer(s)	Length
1.	"U Got the Look"		3:46
2.	"If I Was Your Girlfriend"		5:04
3.	"Strange Relationship"		4:01
4.	"I Could Never Take the Place of Your Man"		6:29
5.	"The Cross"		4:49
6.	"It's Gonna Be a Beautiful Night"	Prince; Matt Fink; Eric Leeds	9:02
7.	"Adore"		6:35
Total length:			39:46

CD 3 / LPs 3 & 4: Single Mixes & Edits Remastered
No.	Title	Writer(s)	Length
1.	"Sign o' the Times" (Edit)		3:41
2.	"La, La, La, He, He, Hee" (Edit)	Prince; Easton	3:22
3.	"La, La, La, He, He, Hee" (Highly Explosive)	Prince; Easton	10:47
4.	"If I Was Your Girlfriend" (Edit)		3:47
5.	"Shockadelica"		3:31
6.	"Shockadelica" (12" Long Version)		6:13
7.	"U Got the Look" (Long Look)		6:41
8.	"Housequake" (Edit)		3:22
9.	"Housequake" (7 Minutes MoQuake)		7:12
10.	"I Could Never Take the Place of Your Man" (Fade)		3:39
11.	"Hot Thing" (Edit)		3:41
12.	"Hot Thing" (Extended Remix)		8:32
13.	"Hot Thing" (Dub Version)		6:53
Total length:			71:21

CD 4 / LPs 5 & 6: Vault Tracks I (all tracks previously unreleased)
No.	Title	Writer(s)	Length
1.	"I Could Never Take the Place of Your Man" (1979 version)		3:13
2.	"Teacher, Teacher" (1985 version)		3:08
3.	"All My Dreams"		7:24
4.	"Can I Play with U?" (featuring Miles Davis)		6:40
5.	"Wonderful Day" (Original Version)		3:48
6.	"Strange Relationship" (Original Version)		6:42
7.	"Visions"	Coleman	2:19
8.	"The Ballad of Dorothy Parker" (with Horns)		4:56
9.	"Witness 4 the Prosecution" (Version 1)		4:00
10.	"Power Fantastic" (Live in Studio)	Prince; Melvoin; Coleman	7:18
11.	"And That Says What?"		1:50
12.	"Love and Sex"		4:12
13.	"A Place in Heaven" (Prince Vocal)		2:58
14.	"Colors"	Wendy Melvoin	1:01
15.	"Crystal Ball (Note: Full version officially released on Crystal Ball.)" (7" mix)		3:30
16.	"Big Tall Wall" (Version 1)		5:59
17.	"Nevaeh ni Ecalp A"		2:33
18.	"In a Large Room with No Light"	Prince; Melvoin; Coleman	3:28
Total length:			74:59

CD 5 / LPs 7 & 8: Vault Tracks II (all tracks previously unreleased)
No.	Title	Length
1.	"Train"	4:22
2.	"It Ain't Over 'Til the Fat Lady Sings"	2:22
3.	"Eggplant" (Original Prince Vocal)	5:19
4.	"Everybody Want What They Don't Got"	2:09
5.	"Blanche"	5:37
6.	"Soul Psychodelicide (Note: "Soul Psychodelicide" was referenced in "Joy in Repetition".)" (1986 Master)	12:37
7.	"The Ball (Note: "The Ball" eventually got reworked into "Eye No".)"	4:34
8.	"Adonis and Bathsheba"	5:28
9.	"Forever in My Life" (Early Vocal Run-Through)	6:25
10.	"Crucial" (Alternate Lyrics)	6:15
11.	"The Cocoa Boys"	6:06
12.	"When the Dawn of the Morning Comes"	6:17
13.	"Witness 4 the Prosecution" (Version 2)	5:03
14.	"It Be's Like That Sometimes"	3:19
Total length:		75:53

CD 6 / LPs 9 & 10: Vault Tracks III (all tracks previously unreleased)
No.	Title	Length
1.	"Emotional Pump"	4:59
2.	"Rebirth of the Flesh" (Original Outro)	5:28
3.	"Cosmic Day"	5:39
4.	"Walkin' in Glory"	5:14
5.	"Wally"	4:45
6.	"I Need a Man"	5:33
7.	"Promise to Be True"	3:38
8.	"Jealous Girl" (Version 2)	4:52
9.	"There's Something I Like About Being Your Fool"	3:49
10.	"Big Tall Wall" (Version 2)	5:46
11.	"A Place in Heaven" (Lisa Vocal)	2:46
12.	"Wonderful Day" (12" Mix)	7:34
13.	"Strange Relationship" (1987 Shep Pettibone Club Mix)	7:08
Total length:		67:11

CD 7 / LPs 11-12A: Live in Utrecht 6/20/87 (all tracks previously unreleased)
No.	Title	Writer(s)	Length
1.	"Sign o' the Times"		5:36
2.	"Play in the Sunshine"		4:36
3.	"Little Red Corvette"		1:36
4.	"Housequake"		4:52
5.	"Girls & Boys"		4:17
6.	"Slow Love"	Prince; Davis	5:06
7.	"Take the 'A' Train / Pacemaker / I Could Never Take the Place of Your Man"	Prince; Billy Strayhorn; Leeds	10:17
8.	"Hot Thing"		6:15
9.	"Four" (with Sheila E. Drum Solo)	Prince; Sheila E.	6:12
10.	"If I Was Your Girlfriend"		5:17
Total length:			54:04

CD 8 / LPs 12B-13: Live in Utrecht 6/20/87 (all tracks previously unreleased)
No.	Title	Writer(s)	Length
1.	"Let's Go Crazy"		6:10
2.	"When Doves Cry"		2:46
3.	"Purple Rain"		5:40
4.	"1999"		5:54
5.	"Forever in My Life"		13:12
6.	"Kiss"		3:33
7.	"The Cross"		7:44
8.	"It's Gonna Be a Beautiful Night"	Prince; Fink; Leeds	13:55
Total length:			58:54

DVD: Live at Paisley Park 12/31/87 (live tracks previously unreleased)
No.	Title	Length
1.	"Intro"	0:29
2.	"Sign o' the Times"	5:11
3.	"Play in the Sunshine"	4:22
4.	"Little Red Corvette"	1:38
5.	"Erotic City"	3:06
6.	"Housequake"	4:08
7.	"Slow Love"	0:59
8.	"Do Me, Baby"	2:00
9.	"Adore"	6:46
10.	"I Could Never Take the Place of Your Man"	7:41
11.	"What's Your Name Jam"	5:31
12.	"Let's Pretend We're Married"	0:52
13.	"Delirious"	1:10
14.	"Jack U Off"	1:43
15.	"Drum Solo" (featuring Sheila E.)	4:02
16.	"Twelve"	1:46
17.	"Hot Thing"	4:55
18.	"If I Was Your Girlfriend"	6:56
19.	"Let's Go Crazy"	6:51
20.	"When Doves Cry"	2:44
21.	"Purple Rain"	14:10
22.	"1999"	3:14
23.	"U Got the Look"	8:05
24.	"It's Gonna Be a Beautiful Night Medley (Note: Medley includes "Chain of Fools", "Hon E Man", "Pacemaker", "Take the 'A' Train", "Six", "Movie Star", "Housequake", "Cold Sweat", "Mother Popcorn", "Lines", and "Land of a Thousand Dances".)" (featuring Miles Davis)	34:08
Total length:		132:12

== Personnel ==
Credits adapted from Duane Tudahl, Benoît Clerc and Guitarcloud.

- Prince – lead and backing vocals, guitars, bass guitar, piano, synthesizers (Note: The synthesizers used include the Ensoniq Mirage, Oberheim OB-Xa, Oberheim OB-8, Sequential Prophet VS, and the Yamaha DX7.), Fairlight CMI (tracks 1;1–6, 1;8, 2;1–5, 2;7), Hammond organ (tracks 1;4, 2;7), Linn LM-1, LinnDrum, acoustic drums (tracks 1;2, 1;6–7, 2;5), percussion (Note: The percussion used includes finger cymbals, cowbell, and a tambourine.), Publison IM90 Infernal Machine (tracks 1;3, 2;1–3)
- Wendy Melvoin – backing vocals (tracks 1;7, 2;6), electric guitar (tracks 1;7, 2;3, 2;6), tambourine and Fairlight CMI (track 2;3)
- Lisa Coleman – backing vocals (track 1;7), Fairlight CMI (track 2;3), keyboards and backing vocals (track 2;6)
- Sheila E. – Linn LM-1, cymbals, hi-hat, cowbells and timbales (track 2;1), congas (track 2;3), percussion and transmississippirap (track 2;6)
- Dr. Fink – keyboards (track 2;6)
- Miko Weaver – electric guitar (track 2;6)
- Brown Mark – bass guitar (track 2;6)
- Bobby Z. – Simmons SDSV (track 2;6)
- Eric Leeds – saxophone (tracks 1;3, 1;7–8, 2;6–7)
- Atlanta Bliss – trumpet (tracks 1;3, 1;7, 2;6–7)
- Susannah Melvoin – backing vocals (tracks 1;2, 1;4, 1;6), vocals (track 2;6)
- Jill Jones – vocals (track 2;6)
- Gilbert Davison, Coke Johnson, Todd Herreman, Susan Rogers, Mike Slotts, Brad Marsh – party voices (track 1;3)
- Novi Novog – violin (track 2;7)
- Sheena Easton – lead vocals (track 2;1)
- Clare Fischer – string arrangements

The live audience on "It's Gonna Be a Beautiful Night" is credited for backing vocals under the name of "6,000 wonderful Parisians" and was recorded during a Parade Tour show in Paris on 25 August 1986, while vocals, Sheila E.'s rap and instrumental overdubs were recorded at Sunset Sound on 22 November.

== Charts ==
=== Weekly charts ===
1987 weekly chart performance for Sign o' the Times
Chart (1987)	Peak position
Australian Kent Music Report	20
Austrian Albums Chart	2
Canadian RPM Albums Chart	25
Dutch Albums Chart	2
Finnish Albums (Suomen virallinen lista)	7
French SNEP Albums Chart	4
Japanese Oricon LPs Chart	13
New Zealand Albums Chart	6
Norwegian Albums Chart	3
Swedish Albums Chart	6
Swiss Albums Chart	1
UK Albums Chart	4
US Billboard 200	6
US Billboard R&B Albums	4
West German Media Control Albums Chart	11

2016 weekly chart performance for Sign o' the Times
Chart (2016)	Peak position
Italian Albums Chart	71
US Billboard 200	20
US Soundtrack Albums (Billboard)	2

2020 weekly chart performance for Sign o' the Times
Chart (2020)	Peak position
Belgian Albums (Ultratop Flanders)	2
Belgian Albums (Ultratop Wallonia)	10
Croatian International Albums (HDU)	1
Danish Albums (Hitlisten)	35
Dutch Albums (Album Top 100)	2
Finnish Albums (Suomen virallinen lista)	48
German Albums (Offizielle Top 100)	3
Hungarian Albums (MAHASZ)	4
Irish Albums (Official Charts)	9
Norwegian Albums (VG-lista)	22
Portuguese Albums (AFP)	18
Spanish Albums (PROMUSICAE)	16
Swiss Albums (Schweizer Hitparade)	3
UK Albums (Official Charts)	7
US Billboard 200	20

=== Year-end charts ===
1987 year-end chart performance for Sign o' the Times
Chart (1987)	Position
Australian Albums Chart	98
Dutch Albums Chart	8
French Albums Chart	24
New Zealand Albums (RMNZ)	32
Swiss Albums Chart	6
UK Albums Chart	79
US Billboard Pop Albums	47

== Certifications and sales ==
Certifications and sales for Sign o' the Times
Region	Certification	Certified units/sales
Australia (ARIA)	Gold	35,000^{^}
Brazil	—	25,000
France (SNEP)	2× Gold	200,000^{*}
Germany (BVMI)	Gold	250,000^{^}
Italy	—	70,000
Netherlands (NVPI)	Platinum	100,000^{^}
New Zealand (RMNZ)	Gold	7,500^{^}
Switzerland (IFPI Switzerland)	Gold	25,000^{^}
United Kingdom (BPI)	Platinum	300,000^{^}
United States (RIAA)	Platinum	1,000,000^{^}
^{*} Sales figures based on certification alone.^{^} Shipments figures based on certification alone.
