= The Revolution (band) =

American band

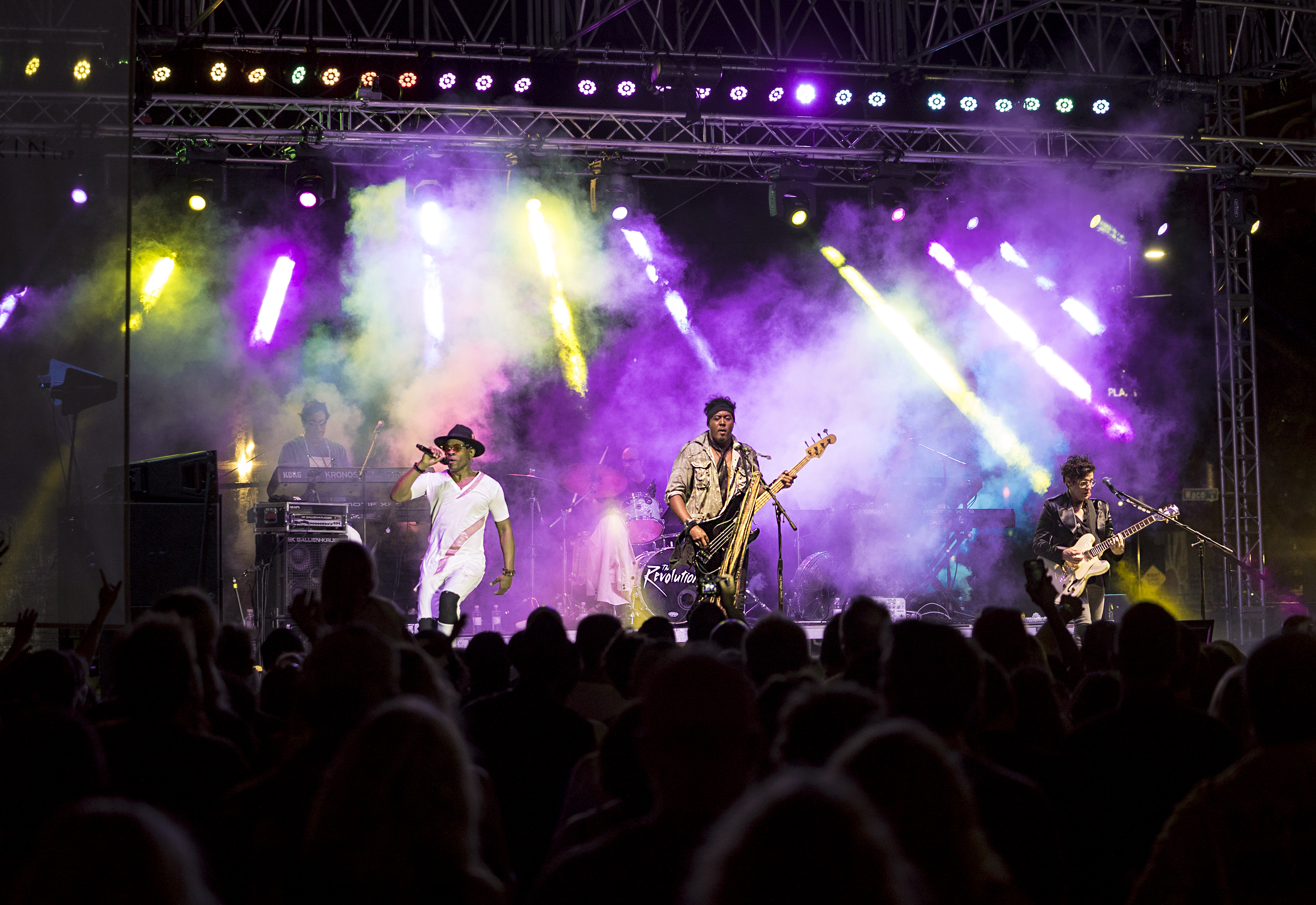
- The Revolution performing at Wichita Riverfest in 2018

Background information
- Also known as: Prince and the Revolution (1979–1986)
- Origin: Minneapolis, Minnesota, U.S.
- Genres: R&B; funk rock; psychedelic pop; Minneapolis sound
- Occupation: Backing band
- Years active: 1979–1986; 2012; 2016–present
- Labels: Warner Bros.; Paisley Park
- Members: Bobby Z. Doctor Fink; Lisa Coleman; Brownmark; Wendy Melvoin
- Past members: Prince; Dez Dickerson; André Cymone (pre-Revolution); Gayle Chapman (pre-Revolution); Miko Weaver; Eric Leeds; Atlanta Bliss; Susannah Melvoin; Jerome Benton; Wally Safford; Greg Brooks
- Website: therevolutionofficial.com

The Revolution is an American funk rock band formed in Minneapolis, Minnesota, in 1979 by Prince, serving as his live band and later as his studio band. The band's sound incorporated rock, funk, R&B, new wave, synthpop and psychedelia elements. Along with Prince's other projects, the Revolution helped create the Minneapolis sound. By the time of their 1986 breakup, the Revolution had backed Prince on two studio albums, two soundtracks and two videos.

After making its studio album debut on 1999 (1982), the Revolution rose to international fame with Purple Rain (1984), which reached number one on the Billboard 200 and became certified 13× Platinum by the Recording Industry Association of America (RIAA). The band achieved its second number-one Billboard 200 album with Around the World in a Day in 1985. They charted six top 10 singles on the Billboard Hot 100 chart, including three number-ones: "Let's Go Crazy", "When Doves Cry" and "Kiss".

The Revolution officially disbanded in 1986 after the Hit n Run – Parade Tour, which supported Parade, the soundtrack for Under the Cherry Moon, but following Prince's death in 2016, the band announced reunion shows. The Revolution has won three Grammy Awards.

== The pre-Revolution ==
When Prince formed his backing band after the release of his first album, influenced by Sly Stone, he created a multi-racial musical ensemble with both male and female performers. The band initially consisted of:

- Prince on lead vocals, backing vocals, guitar, and piano
- Dez Dickerson on guitar and backing vocals
- Andre Cymone on bass guitar
- Bobby Z. on drums and percussion
- Gayle Chapman on keyboards
- Matt Fink on keyboards

Though officially unnamed, Prince experimented with the band acting as a side project known as The Rebels, recording material in 1979 in Colorado to get more music out. The recordings were a group effort with lead vocals by Cymone, Dickerson or Chapman. The project was shelved for unknown reasons, but two of the tracks were later re-recorded and given away by Prince: "You", became "U", and was released on Paula Abdul's 1991 Spellbound album; while "If I Love U 2 Nite" was released by both Mica Paris and Prince's later wife, Mayte Garcia. Paris rerecorded the song from scratch, which was released in 1991. Garcia's version, released in 1995, was rerecorded by Prince.

On the next two tours following the Prince Tour, the band underwent two line-up changes. Gayle Chapman quit the band in 1980. The end came when she told Prince she needed more musical fulfillment and growth for herself, but Prince wanted her to commit to some short-noticed rehearsals instead. After a long conversation, Chapman quit the group to be replaced by Lisa Coleman.

The following year, after the Dirty Mind Tour, bass guitarist André Cymone would leave the band. Cymone, whose family gave Prince a home after he left his father's house, left over a number of grievances with Prince—little input in the studio, he was not getting credit for his contributions to Prince's music, and in general his desire to start his own career—and would have bitter feelings toward Prince as he later claimed that Prince stole many of his ideas that were used for the Time and that he created the bassline for Controversy's "Do Me, Baby". Ultimately, Cymone was replaced by Mark Brown, renamed Brownmark by Prince. Coleman was usually only identified by her first name, while Fink started wearing surgical scrubs on stage and became known as "Doctor" Fink. Fink originally wore a black- and white-striped prison jumpsuit. However, a member of Rick James' band was doing the same thing and not wanting to copy that, Prince asked Fink, "Do you have any other ideas?" Fink said, "What about a doctor's outfit?" Prince loved the idea, and thus was born Doctor Fink.

From 1982 to 1983, when the band was almost identified as the Revolution, it consisted of:

- Prince on lead vocals, backing vocals, guitar, and piano
- Dez Dickerson on guitar
- Brown Mark on bass
- Bobby Z. on drums and percussion
- Lisa Coleman on keyboards and piano
- Matt Fink on keyboards
- JJ on vocals

The words "and the Revolution" can be seen printed backwards on the cover of his fifth album 1999. The band members were curious as to if they were getting a real name, but Prince had held back from fully calling the group the Revolution partly because of Dez Dickerson's wishes to leave the band. When the 1999 Tour ended, Dez Dickerson finally left the band for religious reasons and was replaced by Coleman's childhood friend Wendy Melvoin. Prince told Dickerson that he needed three years from him, and Dickerson was not willing to commit. Prince told Dickerson he'd leave him on payroll and honor his contract, which Prince did. Dickerson went on to eventually work for independent Christian record label Star Song. Wendy and Lisa shortly thereafter formed a special bond with Prince and greatly influenced his output during the rest of their tenure in the band. Prince's former mostly R&B/funk offerings would be more diversified with rock, pop, and classical music elements.

== Prince and The Revolution ==
=== Purple Rain (1984–1985) ===
Prince and The Revolution's best-selling album, Purple Rain, produced by Prince and The Revolution themselves, peaked at number one on the Billboard 200 knocking Bruce Springsteen's Born in the U.S.A. from the number one spot. Released at the end of June 1984, the album featured the singles "When Doves Cry", "Let's Go Crazy", "Purple Rain", "I Would Die 4 U", and "Take Me with U". All the singles had accompanying music videos (all of which included clips from their relative scenes in the movie) and all charted on the Billboard Hot 100, but the first four peaked within the top 10 while "When Doves Cry" and "Let's Go Crazy" topped the chart. "When Doves Cry" would become the most successful single from Purple Rain at the time of its release on the pop charts, reaching number one on the Billboard Hot 100 as well as the Dance and R&B chart.

The song "Purple Rain" won two Grammy Awards for Best Rock Performance by a Duo or Group with Vocal and Best Instrumental Composition Written Specifically for a Motion Picture or for Television. The album spent 24 weeks at number one and would eventually be certified thirteen times platinum in the United States, six times platinum in Canada and two times platinum in the United Kingdom. Purple Rain would become the first official appearance of The Revolution. At the time of the release the band contained:

- Prince on lead vocals, backing vocals, guitar, and piano
- Wendy Melvoin on guitar and vocals
- Brown Mark on bass guitar and vocals
- Lisa Coleman on keyboards, piano, and vocals
- Matt "Doctor" Fink on keyboards and vocals
- Bobby Z. on drums

=== Expansion (1985–1986) ===
They lasted as such through 1986's Hit n Run – Parade Tour. In 1985, members of the then soon-to-be-defunct R&B/pop group The Family (which, in turn, included former members of another disbanded Prince-associated group, The Time) joined The Revolution, along with people from Sheila E.'s band. The "Counter-Revolution" line-up:

- Prince on lead vocals, backing vocals, guitar, and piano
- Wendy Melvoin on guitar and vocals
- Brown Mark on bass guitar and vocals
- Bobby Z. on drums
- Lisa Coleman on keyboards, piano, and vocals
- Matt Fink on keyboards and vocals
- Miko Weaver on guitar (Note: Miko Weaver joined via association with Sheila E. and as session guitarist for The Family)
- Susannah Melvoin on backing vocals (Note: Susannah Melvoin is a former member of The Family; she was Prince's then-lover and is the twin sister of Wendy Melvoin.)
- Eric Leeds on saxophone (Note: Eric Leeds is a former member of The Family; brother Alan served as Prince's then-tour manager.)
- Matt "Atlanta Bliss" Blistan on trumpet (Note: Atlanta Bliss joined via association with friend and former bandmate Leeds. He was never a member of the Family.)
- Jerome Benton, Wally Safford and Greg Brooks as dancers/vocalists/comic foils (known as The Bodyguards) (Note: Jerome Benton is the sole member of The Time to join The Revolution through The Family due to the departures of St. Paul and Jellybean Johnson.)

For the Hit n Run – Parade Tour, the augmented Revolution with its several new members began to perform the jazzy arrangements from the album, including the horn sections.

== Unreleased Revolution album ==
Dream Factory is an unreleased double LP project recorded by Prince and The Revolution in 1986. The album morphed into Sign o' the Times following the dissolution of The Revolution. "It's Gonna Be a Beautiful Night" is the only track with the full Revolution band kept for inclusion as the album developed. The basis for the track was recorded live on August 25, 1986, in Paris during a show on the Parade Tour. Jill Jones recorded her lead vocal on November 26, 1986, and Sheila E. was on tour with Lionel Richie and recorded her "Transmississippirap" over the phone on the night of November 26/27, 1986. Overdubs and mix were done between November 22 and 30, 1986 at Sunset Sound in Hollywood, California.

== Dissolution ==
In a 2017 direct-to-YouTube interview (on Yahoo's account), Wendy Melvoin remembers Prince rehearsing with all his new selections, and ignoring The Revolution by not looking at them. Brownmark, Wendy and Lisa threatened to quit. At one point, Prince dispatched Bobby Z. to the airport and literally caught Melvoin and Coleman before they boarded. Eventually all three were convinced to ride it out. Prince promised Brownmark a lot of money, but Brownmark settled for $3000 a week, a paltry sum based on other touring bands. He turned down a much more lucrative gig as bassist for Stevie Nicks, who was going on tour at that time. Brown has said that Prince never followed through on "all that money". But as the tour ended, on the final night in Yokohama, Japan, Prince smashed up all of his guitars after a final encore of "Purple Rain". Wendy looked around at the other members and whispered (and they agreed), "It's over!"

Shortly after the Parade Tour in October 1986, after all the tension between Prince, Wendy Melvoin, and Coleman due to his relationship with Susannah Melvoin, Prince invited Wendy Melvoin and Coleman to dinner at his rented Beverly Hills home and fired them both. Unhappy with their lack of credit and creativity, Wendy & Lisa went on to perform as a duo. Susannah ended up leaving the Revolution too, following a breakup with Prince, and performed for a time with Wendy & Lisa as a backup singer in their band.

He then called Bobby Z. to tell him that he was being replaced by Sheila E, although he was kept on payroll for quite a few years after the fact, honoring Z's contract. Bobby Z released a solo album in 1989.

Brownmark was asked to stay, but quit. Although he said it was "partly out of loyalty to the others" and also because he was "unhappy with the direction of Prince's music at the time".

Matt Fink remained with Prince until 1991, when similar to the exit of Jimmy Jam and Terry Lewis from The Time, Matt Fink told Prince he was not available for two dates at the Rock in Rio festival, as he was busy producing for another band at the time, and found himself replaced by Tommy Barbarella. Fink also stated in a 2001 interview that he was tired of being in the band. When Prince filmed Graffiti Bridge, Prince wanted Fink to "rehearse the band" and was told that "there wasn't really anywhere in the movie for him". After the ensuing Nude Tour, essentially a greatest hits-type tour, Fink left for a career writing music for video games, and working at K-Tel Records, based out of Minneapolis. Unlike his bandmates, Fink did not immediately release any solo material, an album not being released until 2001.

== Reunions ==
In 2000, Prince had a celebration concert in his hometown of Minneapolis, Minnesota, and asked if any former bandmates wished to perform. Dr. Fink, Bobby Z. and Brown Mark appeared and joined Prince on stage to perform the song "America".

On December 13, 2003, Sheila E. organized a concert for the charity 1st Annual Family Jamm, which featured several of Prince's protégés, including the entire Revolution, without Prince. They played six songs including "Mountains", "Purple Rain", and "Baby I'm a Star". That next year, Wendy Melvoin performed a live rendition of Musicology track "Reflection" with Prince on Tavis Smiley's PBS television program.

At the 2006 BRIT Awards, a reformed Revolution once again backed Prince, as he reunited with Wendy, Lisa and Sheila E., while also featuring former New Power Generation member Morris Hayes and played "Te Amo Corazón" (from Prince's 3121 album), "Fury" (also from 3121), "Purple Rain", and "Let's Go Crazy". Sheila E. played drums only on "Purple Rain", playing percussion for the rest of the songs.

On February 19, 2012, The Revolution (without Prince) performed a reunion/benefit concert in Minneapolis at First Avenue, where the Purple Rain movie was filmed.

Following the death of Prince on April 21, 2016, The Revolution announced that they were getting back together as a band. As of 2024, they continue to perform Prince's songs live.

== Personnel ==
Current members

- Bobby Z. – drums, percussion (1979–1986, 2012, 2016–present)
- Matt Fink – keyboards, synthesizers, vocals (1979–1986, 2012, 2016–present) (continued to work with Prince until Nude Tour)
- Lisa Coleman – keyboards, synthesizers, vocals (1980–1986, 2012, 2016–present)
- Brown Mark – bass guitar, vocals (1981–1986, 2012, 2016–present)
- Wendy Melvoin – guitar, vocals (1983–1986, 2012, 2016–present)

Former members

- Prince – lead and backing vocals, lead and rhythm guitar, keyboards, synthesizers, piano, bass guitar, drums, percussion (1979–1986; died in 2016)
- Dez Dickerson – lead guitar, backing vocals (1979–1983)
- André Cymone – bass guitar, backing vocals (1979–1981)
- Gayle Chapman – keyboards, vocals (1979–1980)
- Miko Weaver – rhythm guitar (1985–1986) (continued to work with Prince until Nude Tour)
- Eric Leeds – saxophone (1985–1986) (continued to work with Prince until Graffiti Bridge album and made a guest appearance on "Gett Off")
- Matt "Atlanta Bliss" Blistan – trumpet (1985–1986) (continued to work with Prince until Graffiti Bridge album)
- Susannah Melvoin – backing vocals (1985–1986)
- Jerome Benton – dancer, vocals (1985–1986)
- Wally Safford – dancer, vocals (1985–1986) (continued to work with Prince during Sign o' the Times era)
- Greg Brooks – dancer, vocals (1985–1986) (continued to work with Prince during Sign o' the Times era)

== Honors and awards ==
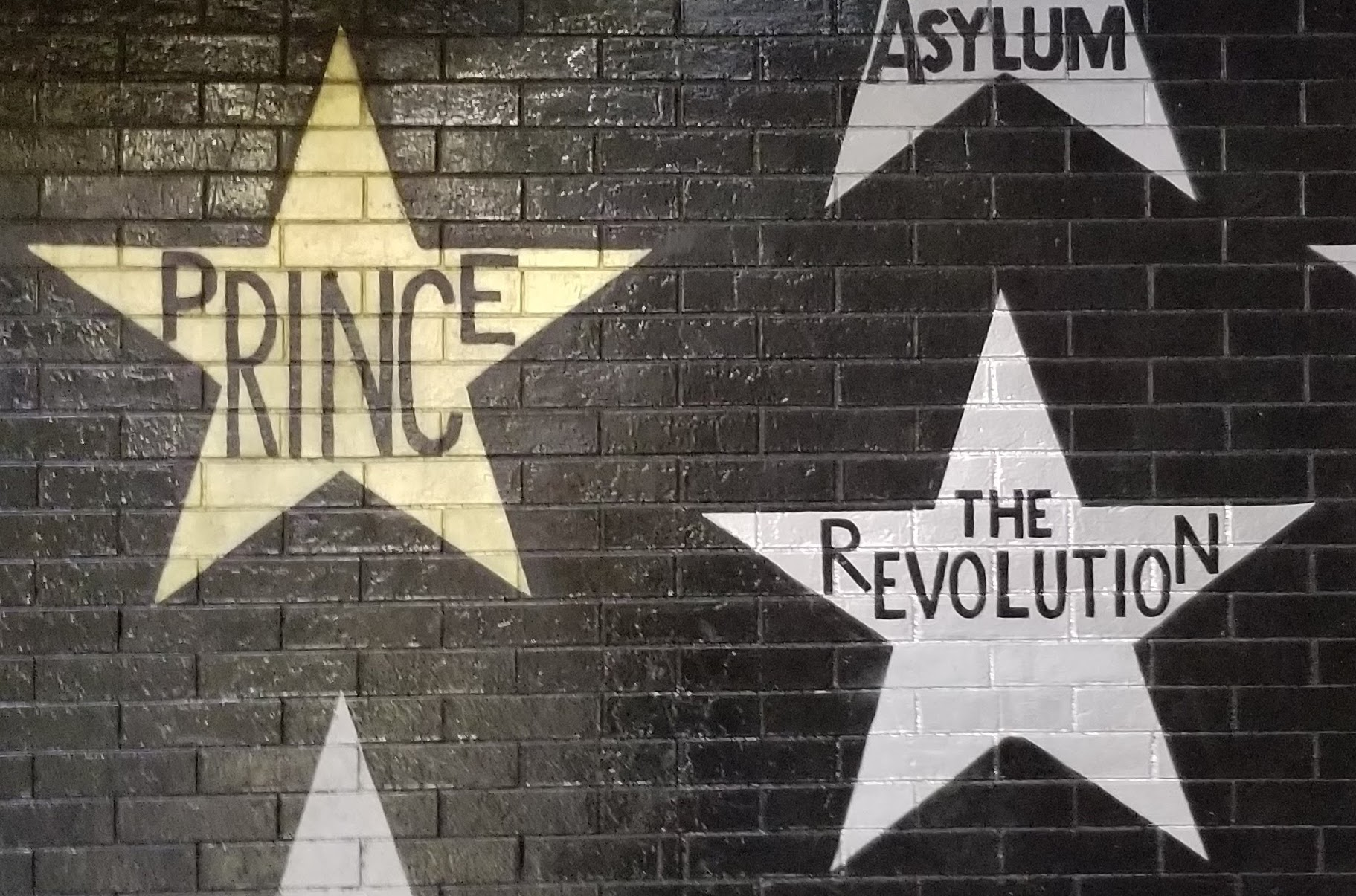
Stars honoring Prince and his band The Revolution on the outside mural of the Minneapolis nightclub First Avenue

The Revolution has been honored with a star on the outside mural of the Minneapolis nightclub First Avenue, recognizing performers that have played sold-out shows or have otherwise demonstrated a major contribution to the culture at the iconic venue. Receiving a star "might be the most prestigious public honor an artist can receive in Minneapolis," according to journalist Steve Marsh. The band's star is located to the immediate right of Prince's own star on the mural.

== Discography ==
The Revolution discography
- Studio albums: 2
- Soundtrack albums: 2
- Singles: 18
- Video albums: 2
- Music videos: 16

=== Studio albums ===
Year	Album details	Peak chart positions										Certifications		
Year	Album details	US	AUS	AUT	CAN	GER	NLD	NOR	SWE	SWI	UK	CAN	UK	US
1982	1999 (not credited): Released: October 27, 1982; Label: Warner Bros.	7	35	—	23	—	45	—	—	51	28	Platinum	Platinum	4× Platinum; WW: 6.5 million
1985	Around the World in a Day: Released: April 22, 1985; Label: Warner Bros.	1	12	7	16	10	1	10	1	8	5		Gold	2× Platinum; WW: 7.0 million

=== Soundtrack albums ===
Year	Album details	Peak chart positions										Certifications		
Year	Album details	US	AUS	AUT	CAN	GER	NLD	NOR	SWE	SWI	UK	CAN	UK	US
1984	Purple Rain: Released: June 25, 1984; Label: Warner Bros.	1	1	8	1	5	1	4	3	7	4	6× Platinum	2× Platinum	13× Platinum; WW: 22.0 – 25.0 million
1986	Parade: Released: March 31, 1986; Label: Warner Bros.	3	8	7	11	6	1	10	5	2	4		Platinum	Platinum; WW: 4.0 million

=== Singles ===
Year	Song	Peak chart positions											Album
Year	Song	US	US R&B	US Dance	AUS	AUT	GER	NLD	NOR	SWE	SWI	UK	Album
1982	"1999"	12	4	1	2	—	—	14	—	—	—	2	1999
1983	"Little Red Corvette"	6	15	61	8	—	—	—	—	—	—	2	1999
1983	"Delirious"	8	18	—	—	—	—	—	—	—	—	—	1999
1983	"Let's Pretend We're Married" (US-only) /	52	55	52	—	—	—	—	—	—	—	—	1999
1983	"Irresistible Bitch"	—	—	52	—	—	—	—	—	—	—	—	Non-album single
1983	"Automatic" (Australia-only)	—	—	—	—	—	—	—	—	—	—	—	1999
1984	"When Doves Cry" /	1	1	1	1	19	16	6	10	18	17	4	Purple Rain
1984	"17 Days"	—	—	1	—	—	—	—	—	—	—	—	Non-album single
1984	"Let's Go Crazy" /	1	1	1	10	—	—	11	—	—	—	7	Purple Rain
1984	"Erotic City"	—	—	1	—	—	—	—	—	—	—	—	Non-album single
1984	"Purple Rain"	2	4	—	41	4	5	1	5	5	4	6	Purple Rain
1984	"I Would Die 4 U" /	8	11	50	96	—	—	7	—	—	—		Purple Rain
1984	"Another Lonely Christmas"	— (Note: "Another Lonely Christmas" charted for 1 week at #5 on Billboard's Christmas Singles chart.)	—	—	—	—	—	—	—	—	—	—	Non-album single
1984	"Take Me with U" (with Apollonia Kotero)	25	40	—	—	—	—	—	—	—	—	7	Purple Rain
1985	"Paisley Park"	—	—	—	38	—	—	—	—	—	—	18	Around the World in a Day
1985	"Raspberry Beret"	2	3	4	13	—	35	—	—	—	—	25	Around the World in a Day
1985	"Pop Life" /	7	8	5	67	—	65	—	—	—	—	60	Around the World in a Day
1985	"Hello"	—	—	5	—	—	—	—	—	—	—	—	Non-album single
1985	"America" /	46	35	31	—	—	—	—	—	—	—	—	Around the World in a Day
1985	"Girl"	—	—	31	—	—	—	—	—	—	—	—	Non-album single
1986	"Kiss" /	1	1	1	2	8	4	—	10	16	3	6	Parade
1986	"♥ or $"	—	—	1	—	—	—	—	—	—	—	—	Non-album single
1986	"Mountains"	23	15	11	45	—	32	—	—	—	—	45	Parade
1986	"Anotherloverholenyohead" /	63	18	21	—	—	—	—	—	—	—	36	Parade
1986	"Girls & Boys"	—	—	21	—	—	27	—	—	—	—	11	Parade

=== Video albums ===
Year	Album details	Peak chart positions										Certifications		
Year	Album details	US	AUS	AUT	CAN	GER	NLD	NOR	SWE	SWI	UK	CAN	UK	US
1984	Purple Rain: Released: December 14, 1984; Label: Warner Bros. Records	1	—	—	—	—	—	—	—	—	—			
1985	Prince and the Revolution: Live: Released: March 6, 1985; Label: Warner Bros. Records	1	—	—	—	—	—	—	—	—	—			2× Platinum

== Tours ==
- Purple Rain Tour (1984–85)
- Hit n Run – Parade Tour (1986)

== See also ==
- List of The Revolution band members
- List of number-one hits (United States)
- List of artists who reached number one on the Hot 100 (U.S.)
- List of number-one dance hits (United States)
- List of artists who reached number one on the U.S. Dance Club Songs chart
