= Bobby Z. =

American drummer (born 1956)

- Born: Robert B. Rivkin; January 9, 1956 (age 70); Minneapolis, Minnesota, U.S.
- Genres: R&B, funk, rock, soul, new wave, Minneapolis sound
- Occupations: Musician, drummer, record producer
- Instruments: Drums, percussion, piano
- Label: Copycats
- Formerly of: Prince and the Revolution

Robert B. Rivkin (born January 9, 1956), also known by the stage name Bobby Z., is an American musician and record producer, best known as being the drummer for Prince's backing band The Revolution from 1978 to 1986.

== Life and career ==
=== Early life ===
Rivkin began his musical career at the age of six, playing several instruments before settling on the drums. In junior high school, he formed a small touring band in the Minneapolis area which included future Chicago Bears football coach Marc Trestman on rhythm guitar.

=== Career with Prince ===
Rivkin met Prince in the late 1970s as Prince was forming his first band for touring. He started running errands for Prince while working for Owen Husney, who is credited with discovering Prince. Rivkin's stage name, Bobby Z., was derived from the nickname his grandmother used to call him, "Butzie".

Prince was adamant about having a white drummer in an effort to have a racially diverse band, so Husney implored Prince to audition Rivkin. Rivkin replaced Dale Alexander during the 94East band sessions, prior to Prince moving into his own "For You" album sessions. Alexander later became the drummer for Prince's protege group Madhouse in 1987. Rivkin was acknowledged in Prince's self-titled album as being a "heaven-sent" helper alongside Andre Cymone. By the time the 1999 album was released, Prince was relying more and more on electronic drums and Rivkin had to adapt his style to operate these in concert as well as the studio, starting with Controversy. He contributed to Purple Rain, Around the World in a Day, Parade and Sign o' the Times. When The Revolution disbanded in 1986 after the Parade Tour, Prince selected Sheila E, the daughter of veteran Bay Area drummer and percussionist Pete Escovedo, for his new band.

=== Career after Prince and The Revolution ===
Bobby Z. produced The Suburbs' 1986 self-titled A&M Records album (credited as Robert Brent). In 1988 he produced tracks for Boy George's album, Tense Nervous Headache. Rivkin helped Wendy & Lisa on their debut album and he released his own self-titled album in 1989 (which included a re-recorded version of his song "River Run Dry", written for The Family). Since then he has focused more on producing for the record label division of Copycats Media.

=== Health, recovery and reunions with Prince ===
Bobby Z. suffered a heart attack in early 2010. After his recovery, he made it his mission to raise public awareness of heart attack warning signs and risk factors. He has lobbied Congress for continued research and he created a fundraising charity, "My Purple Heart", which went about raising both funds and awareness of heart disease.

In 2011, he celebrated the one-year anniversary of surviving his near-fatal heart attack at First Avenue, with a rare reunion performance of The Revolution—Wendy Melvoin, Lisa Coleman, Brown Mark, Dr. Fink, Dez Dickerson, plus Eric Leeds, which raised funds to benefit heart-health awareness. The concert, billed as a 'Benefit 2 Celebrate Life!' and co-presented by Z and the American Heart Association, was the first time The Revolution had played since 2003.

My Purple Heart partnered with the American Heart Association again in 2013 to host a benefit concert and weekend block party at First Avenue on the second anniversary of his heart attack. Again, members of The Revolution appeared, as well as guests Maya Rudolph, Twin Cities musician and a runner-up on The Voice Nicholas David, Alexander O'Neal, André Cymone, Dez Dickerson, Dr. Fink, Wendy Melvoin and Questlove.

In May 2013, Bobby Z joined Prince on stage during the closing two shows of Prince's whirlwind 3rdeyegirl tour. Both shows were the same night with Bobby taking over from Prince's drummer Hannah Welton-Ford for "Purple Rain".

=== Other projects ===
Bobby Z hosted a weekly radio show on 96.3 K-TWIN in Minneapolis.

== Equipment ==
Drum kit with Prince in the 1980s:

- Ludwig kit
- Black Simmons SDSV pads
- Simmons SDSV Module
- Linn LM-1 Drum Machine
- LinnDrum Drum Machine
- Black Pearl Syncussion pads (x2)
- Pearl Syncussion Modules (x2)
- Zildjian 14" HiHat
- Zildjian 18" Crash
- Zildjian 20" Ride
- Zildjian 16" Crash

== Personal life ==
Bobby's brothers are Stephen E. Rivkin, a film editor and music video director, and David Z, a producer. He is married to his wife Vicki.
