= The Ballad of Dorothy Parker =

Song by Prince

from the album Sign o' the Times
- Released: March 31, 1987
- Recorded: March 13–15, 1986
- Studio: Galpin Blvd. Home Studio
- Genre: Lo-fi; psychedelic pop
- Length: 4:04
- Label: Paisley Park; Warner Bros.
- Songwriter: Prince
- Producer: Prince

"The Ballad of Dorothy Parker" is a song written and performed by Prince. It is the fourth track on his 1987 double album Sign o' the Times, and features a reference to one of Prince's favorite artists, Joni Mitchell. The track was planned to be the album's fifth and final single, but this never came to fruition and remains unreleased in that format.

== Background ==
Prior to the release of his album Parade, Prince had already begun recording music for his next project. One of the first things he worked on was this track, which was being recorded on newly installed equipment, according to Prince's engineer Susan Rogers:

We were installing a new custom-made console in his home studio. Paisley Park was being built, but it wasn’t finished yet. The fellow who designed this console, whose name was Frank De Medio, came in from Los Angeles. He was hooking it all up and Prince couldn’t take it anymore. He was just dying to record, and he told me to send Frank home. He says, “Just send him home. I just got to work.”...We put Frank on a plane and we sent him home, and Prince came downstairs and said the magic words: “Fresh tape.” I put up fresh tape, and we started recording the song.

Eventually, Rogers realized a fatal error which meant that the whole recording sounded like it was underwater:

As soon as I heard it, I realized, "Oh my God, there is no high end." It was the opposite of Kate Bush. It sounded like there were low-pass filters on everything. First, I was thinking it was just one track. It wasn’t. It was the whole console. I’m thinking, "Oh, please stop, so I can get out the voltmeter and see what's going on with this console." But he wouldn’t stop, and he just kept going, and going, and going. It was like a baby eating baby food. It’s like, when’s it going to stop?

The issue was resolved after the discovery that only half of the bipolar power supplies on the console was on, but it wasn't fixed for the track, retaining its "underwater" quality. Lyrically, the track mentions a waitress who offers him a bath, which retrospectively fits the recording's underwater sound.

The track makes a reference to one of Prince's favorite artists, Joni Mitchell, by one of her songs. Midway through the song, the lyrics "...and it was Joni singing 'help me, I think I'm falling'..." reference Mitchell's biggest hit single, "Help Me". A few months after the track's recording, the two tried to collaborate on a track, with Prince sending her the track "Emotional Pump" to sing. Mitchell rejected the track, reasoning that the track was too risqué. Despite this, the two continued to praise each other's work, even after Prince's death.

== Personnel ==
Credits from Duane Tudahl, Benoît Clerc and Guitarcloud

- Prince – lead and backing vocals, Yamaha DX7, Fairlight CMI, Hammond organ, bass guitar, Linn LM-1
- Susannah Melvoin – backing vocals

== Charts ==
=== Weekly charts ===
Chart (1987)	Peak position
Italy Airplay (Music & Media)	6
