= Electronic funk =

Electronic funk may refer to:

- Synth-funk
- Electrofunk
- Minneapolis sound
- Funktronica
- Dance punk
