= Purple Rain (song) =

1984 single by Prince and the Revolution

- US 12-inch single artwork

Single by Prince and the Revolution

from the album Purple Rain
- B-side: "God"; "God" (instr, UK 12-inch)
- Released: September 26, 1984
- Recorded: August 3, 1983 (live basic track); August–September 1983 (overdubs)
- Studio: Sunset Sound, Los Angeles (overdubs)
- Venue: First Avenue, Minneapolis, Minnesota (live basic track)
- Genre: Rock; soul; gospel
- Length: 8:41 (album/12-inch version); 4:05 (7-inch edit)
- Label: Warner Bros.
- Songwriter: Prince (Note: The original single release credits the authors of the song as Prince and the Revolution, but the song's authorship is registered with ASCAP as solely by Prince.)
- Producers: Prince and the Revolution

Prince and the Revolution singles chronology
"Let's Go Crazy" (1984)	"Purple Rain" (1984)	"I Would Die 4 U" (1984)

Purple Rain singles chronology
Sex Shooter (1984)	Purple Rain (1984)	Jungle Love (1984)

Purple vinyl issue
- Limited edition release

"Purple Rain" is a song by the American musician Prince and his backing band the Revolution. It is the title track from the 1984 album Purple Rain, which in turn is the soundtrack album for the 1984 film Purple Rain starring Prince, and was released as the third single from the album.

"Purple Rain" reached number two on the US Billboard Hot 100 for two weeks in November 1984. It reached number one on the US Cash Box Top 100, where it stayed for two weeks. It is certified gold by the Recording Industry Association of America (RIAA) and is considered to be one of Prince's signature songs. Following Prince's death in 2016, "Purple Rain" re-entered the Billboard Hot 100, where it reached number four in May 2016. It also re-entered the UK Singles Chart at number six, placing two spaces higher than its original peak. In France, where it originally peaked at number twelve, "Purple Rain" reached number one a week after Prince's death.

"Purple Rain" was ranked number 18 on Rolling Stone's 2021 list of the "500 Greatest Songs of All Time" and is included in the Rock and Roll Hall of Fame's "500 Songs that Shaped Rock and Roll". During Prince's performance at the Super Bowl XLI halftime show in 2007, "Purple Rain" was the last song of his set; the event became especially notable when rain fell during the performance while the stage and stadium were lit up with purple lights. The performance has topped lists of the best Super Bowl halftime shows of all time. Prince performed the song as the opening of a medley of his hits with Beyoncé at the 2004 Grammy Awards. It was also the final song he performed at his last concert, which took place on April 14, 2016, a week before his death.

== Background and recording ==
"With Prince, you never knew. I thought we were recording a concert, but I wasn't sure if it was going to be a record, too. I knew they were working on the movie as well. You just had to go in prepared to record whatever it was going to be as well as you could."

— David Z. on recording "Purple Rain" with Prince.

"Purple Rain" was recorded during a benefit concert for the Minnesota Dance Theatre at the First Avenue nightclub in Minneapolis on August 3, 1983. The performance was guitarist Wendy Melvoin's live debut with the Revolution. Drummer Bobby Z. stated, "it certainly was one of the best concerts we ever did".

The concert was recorded by producer David Z. using a mobile recording unit brought in from the Record Plant in New York City, staffed by engineers Dave Hewitt and Koster McAllister. David's older brother Cliff Rifkin was the regional promotion executive for Warners in Minneapolis, who also expedited Prince's label signing. David Z.'s younger brother, Bobby Z., would then become Prince's drummer in the Revolution. David Z. was requested to set up the live recording on August 3, 1983. A solo and a verse from the original recording were edited out, changing the length from 11 minutes to eight minutes and 41 seconds. The extra verse was about money but was removed because it diluted the emotional impact of the song.

After recording the song, Prince asked Jonathan Cain from Journey to listen to it, as he was worried that it might be too similar to "Faithfully", a Journey single composed by Cain which had recently been in the charts. Cain reassured Prince by telling him that the songs only shared a few chords. Lisa Coleman created the string arrangement that was overdubbed into the song in a studio in Los Angeles.

== Composition and lyrics ==
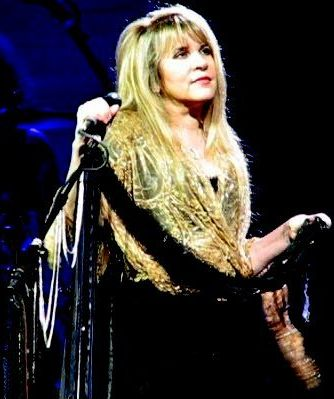
"Purple Rain" was initially conceived as a collaboration with Stevie Nicks.

"Purple Rain" was initially written as a country song and was intended to be a collaboration with fellow American singer-songwriter Stevie Nicks. According to Nicks, she received a ten-minute instrumental version of the song from Prince with a request to write the lyrics, but she felt overwhelmed, and responded, "I can't do it. I wish I could. It's too much for me". At a rehearsal, Prince then asked his backing band to try the song: "I want to try something before we go home. It's mellow". According to the Revolution member Lisa Coleman, Prince then changed the song after fellow band member Wendy Melvoin started playing guitar chords to accompany the song: "He was excited to hear it voiced differently. It took it out of that country feeling. Then we all started playing it a bit harder and taking it more seriously. We played it for six hours straight and by the end of that day we had it mostly written and arranged". The finished song has been described as a gospel, soul and rock ballad. According to sheet music published at Musicnotes.com, "Purple Rain" is written in the key of B-flat major, with a vocal range of F_{4} to A_{5}.

Prince explained the meaning of the song as follows: "When there's blood in the sky... red and blue = purple. Purple rain pertains to the end of the world and being with the one you love and letting your faith/God guide you through the purple rain". According to Lisa Coleman, it symbolizes "a new beginning. Purple, the sky at dawn; rain, the cleansing factor". The title track of Prince's preceding album, 1999, includes similar references to a doomed ending under a purple sky ("...could have sworn it was Judgment Day, the sky was all purple..."). In the context of the film Purple Rain, the song is dedicated to his father, and each verse ties into a different strained relationship of Prince's character The Kid and his desire to reconcile.

== Release and reception ==
"Purple Rain" was released in September 1984 as a single to Purple Rain. The B-side, "God", is a more overtly religious number, recalling the Book of Genesis. The song also features extensive vocal experimentation. "Purple Rain" reached number two on the US Billboard Hot 100 and stayed there for two weeks, being kept off number one by "Wake Me Up Before You Go-Go" by Wham!. It reached number one in Belgium and the Netherlands and is certified gold in the United States. Following Prince's death in 2016, "Purple Rain" re-entered the Billboard Hot 100, where it reached number four in May 2016.

In a contemporary review of the single release, Billboard called the song "pretty majestic", writing: "captured in four minutes, the song and the emotion that make the pivotal moment of a remarkable film [Purple Rain]". Mark Lindores of Classic Pop called the song "the definition of the word 'epic'" and a "soaring, anthemic rock ballad".

"Purple Rain" was ranked number 18 in Rolling Stone's 2021 list of the "500 Greatest Songs of All Time". Pitchfork named it the best song of the 1980s, praising its "sweltering" guitar solo. Paste ranked it as Prince's greatest song, hailing it as the "greatest album closer of all time". The song is also included in the Rock and Roll Hall of Fame's "500 Songs that Shaped Rock and Roll". In May 2026, Rolling Stone placed the song at number one on its list of the "100 Greatest Guitar Solos of All Time". The publication wrote about the "fluidity of [Prince's] phrasing" and the way he "pinched his strings for notes that ascended heavenward". In June 2026, the singer Sara Bareilles selected the song for inclusion on the CBS News list of 250 essential American songs of the past 250 years.

== Live performances and other uses ==
"Purple Rain" was a staple of Prince's live performances. He played it on nearly every tour after 1984, except for a period after his name change when he avoided his older hits. At the Super Bowl XLI halftime show, in which he was the featured performer, "Purple Rain" was featured as the last song of Prince's set and was played during a downpour at the stadium; when combined with the purple stage lighting, this created the song's signature image. The performance has topped lists of the best Super Bowl halftime shows of all time.

Prince performed the song as the opening of a medley of his hits with Beyoncé at the 2004 Grammy Awards, and also at the 2006 Brit Awards. A 20-minute version of the song, featuring a ten-minute guitar solo, was performed at the JMA Wireless Dome in Syracuse, New York in 1985. "Purple Rain" was the final song Prince performed live during his final concert in Atlanta, Georgia, on April 14, 2016, one week before his death from an accidental fentanyl overdose.

Following Prince's death in 2016, Bruce Springsteen and the E Street Band performed "Purple Rain" three times during their The River Tour. Springsteen would again perform the song as an encore during the band's Minneapolis stop of Land of Hope and Dreams American Tour at Target Center. "Purple Rain" was one of several Prince songs used in the one-hundredth episode of the ABC sitcom Black-ish, which was also named after the song, and first aired on November 13, 2018. The episode was a tribute to Prince's musical and cultural legacy, and included performances of his songs by members of the cast.

In 2025, "Purple Rain" was used to soundtrack a climactic sequence in "Chapter Eight: The Rightside Up", the series finale of the Netflix series Stranger Things. Prince's song "When Doves Cry" was also featured earlier in the episode. The original songs had never been used in a film or television show; series co-creator Matt Duffer attributed the Prince estate's willingness to allow the song's use to the success enjoyed by Kate Bush's "Running Up That Hill", following that song's inclusion in the series.

== Personnel ==
Credits adapted from the liner notes of Purple Rain.

- Prince – lead and backing vocals, electric lead guitar, synthesizers, string arrangement
- Wendy Melvoin – electric rhythm guitar, backing vocals, string conductor
- Lisa Coleman – synthesizers, backing vocals, string arrangement, string conductor
- Matt Fink – Yamaha CP-70 electric grand piano, backing vocals
- Brown Mark – bass guitar, backing vocals
- Bobby Z. – Simmons SDSV, Linn LM-1, cymbals
- Novi Novog – violin, viola
- David Coleman – cello
- Suzie Katayama – cello

== Charts ==
=== Weekly charts ===
Weekly chart performance for "Purple Rain"
Chart (1984–2016)	Peak position
Australia (ARIA)	3
Austria (Ö3 Austria Top 40)	4
Belgium (Ultratop 50 Flanders)	1
Belgium (VRT Top 30 Flanders)	1
Canada Top Singles (RPM)	3
Finland (Suomen virallinen lista)	1
France (SNEP)	1
Guatemala (UPI)	3
Ireland (IRMA)	8
Italy (FIMI)	32
Japan Hot 100 (Billboard)	30
Luxembourg (Radio Luxembourg)	5
Netherlands (Dutch Top 40)	1
Netherlands (Single Top 100)	1
New Zealand (Recorded Music NZ)	8
Norway (VG-lista)	5
Scottish Singles Sales (Official Charts)	1
Spain (Promusicae)	2
Sweden (Sverigetopplistan)	5
Switzerland (Schweizer Hitparade)	4
UK Singles (Official Charts)	6
UK Hip Hop/R&B (Official Charts)	3
US Billboard Hot 100	2
US Hot R&B/Hip-Hop Songs (Billboard)	3
US Hot Rock Songs (Billboard)	1
US Cash Box Top 100	1
West Germany (GfK)	5

Weekly chart performance for "Purple Rain"
Chart (2026)	Peak position
France (SNEP) Live version	162
Global 200 (Billboard)	30
Greece International (IFPI)	7
Lithuania (AGATA)	19
UK Singles (Official Charts)	12
UK Hip Hop/R&B (Official Charts)	2

=== Year-end charts ===
1984 year-end chart performance for "Purple Rain"
Chart (1984–1985)	Rank
Belgium (Ultratop 50 Flanders)	6
Canada Top Singles (RPM)	37
Netherlands (Dutch Top 40)	5
Netherlands (Single Top 100)	3
US Cash Box Top 100	17

2016 year-end chart performance for "Purple Rain"
Chart (2016)	Rank
US Hot Rock Songs (Billboard)	22

== Certifications and sales ==
Certifications and sales for "Purple Rain"
Region	Certification	Certified units/sales
Australia (ARIA)	4× Platinum	280,000^{‡}
Denmark (IFPI Danmark)	Platinum	90,000^{‡}
Italy (FIMI) sales since 2009	Platinum	100,000^{‡}
New Zealand (RMNZ)	5× Platinum	150,000^{‡}
Spain (Promusicae)	Gold	30,000^{‡}
United Kingdom (BPI)	3× Platinum	1,800,000^{‡}
United States (RIAA) 1984 physical sales	Gold	1,000,000^{^}
United States digital sales	—	1,720,968
Streaming
Greece (IFPI Greece)	Platinum	2,000,000^{†}
^{^} Shipments figures based on certification alone.^{‡} Sales+streaming figures based on certification alone.^{†} Streaming-only figures based on certification alone.
