= Under the Cherry Moon =

1986 film by Prince

- Theatrical release poster
- Directed by: Prince
- Screenplay by: Becky Johnston
- Produced by: Robert Cavallo; Joseph Ruffalo; Steven Fargnoli
- Starring: Prince; Jerome Benton; Steven Berkoff; Emmanuelle Sallet; Alexandra Stewart; Kristin Scott Thomas; Francesca Annis
- Cinematography: Michael Ballhaus
- Edited by: Éva Gárdos; Rebecca Ross
- Music by: Prince and The Revolution
- Distributed by: Warner Bros.
- Release date: July 2, 1986
- Running time: 100 minutes
- Country: United States
- Language: English
- Budget: $12 million
- Box office: $10.1 million

Under the Cherry Moon is a 1986 American romantic musical comedy-drama film directed by Prince in his directorial debut. The follow-up to his 1984 film debut Purple Rain, it stars himself along with former The Time member Jerome Benton, Steven Berkoff, Kristin Scott Thomas (in her feature film debut) and Francesca Annis. Although the film underperformed both critically and commercially at the time of its release, winning five Golden Raspberry Awards and tying with Howard the Duck for Worst Picture, its associated soundtrack album Parade sold over a million copies and achieved platinum status. Since Prince's death in 2016, several contemporary critics have also revisited the film and now consider it a cult classic.

== Plot ==
Gigolos Christopher Tracy and his friend Tricky, originally from Miami, reside on the French Riviera. Christopher works as a piano player at the Venus de Milo nightclub in Nice and, along with Tricky, spends his days identifying rich women to target in order to gain large amounts of money via marriage. Christopher is in an informal relationship with wealthy divorcee Mrs. Wellington, while Tricky is romantically involved with their landlady, Katy, who is threatening to evict them unless they pay two months of back rent.

One day, while reading the front page of the local newspaper, Tricky notices that heiress Mary Sharon is approaching her 21st birthday and will thus inherit a $50 million trust fund established by her father Isaac, a shipping magnate. Deciding that Mary will make a suitable target, they both gatecrash the party, held at the Sharon Estate. Christopher attracts Mary's attention, but quickly learns that her father has arranged for her to be engaged to Jonathan Donahue, an employee of his, to consolidate the fortunes of two powerful families. Despite his and Tricky's multiple attempts to win her affections, Mary rejects Christopher and summons bouncers to eject both of them. She visits Christopher the following day at the Venus de Milo and delivers a message from Mrs. Wellington to visit her house later that evening. Upon his arrival, he realizes that the arrangement is a setup, as Mrs. Wellington is having an affair with Isaac.

At an exclusive restaurant, both Christopher and Tricky mock Mary's privileged upbringing and lack of street sensibility. Christopher performs "Girls & Boys", but Isaac, alerted to Mary's presence by a maître d', interrupts the song, takes her home and orders his associates, including his bodyguard Lou, to do background checks on the duo. Humiliated at her father's overbearing control over her life, Mary vows to become her own woman. Both Christopher and Tricky start to genuinely fall in love with Mary, but realize that if they continue to pursue her, her father, who has been tracing them, will punish them severely. They attempt to sneak into Mary's bedroom late one night, but accidentally disturb her mother Muriel instead before escaping.

After Christopher courts Mary at a nearby racecourse, Tricky becomes intoxicated at a bar and drunkenly reveals to her the scam that he and Christopher had planned. Upset, she confronts Muriel about the hypocrisy of her upbringing, and they immediately decide to visit Jonathan in New York City. Mrs. Wellington hands Christopher a $100,000 check from Isaac, explaining that the money will be his if he agrees to permanently distance himself from Mary; incensed, Christopher declines, writes a classic obscenity on it, returns it and almost departs when she informs him that Mary and Muriel are departing at midnight on the family's private plane. He reconciles with Mary at the airport after they passionately argue with each other.

At a harbor, Tricky volunteers to be Christopher's best man once Christopher and Mary have arranged their wedding. Sometime later, investigators inform Isaac that they have located Christopher's car which had been parked near the harbor. Meanwhile, Mary awakens at a nearby grotto and notices a heartfelt poem composed by Christopher that she proceeds to read aloud, which notes that nothing, not even death, would ever separate her from him and his undying devotion, while Tricky warns Christopher that Isaac is scouring the premises.

Fully cognizant of their romantic affair, Isaac orders the Chief of Police and the harbor patrol to immediately locate the couple. Mary hurriedly implores Christopher to escape, but he declines, after which a marksman fatally wounds him. As a distraught Tricky falls to his knees, Christopher blissfully passes away in her arms, and when Isaac arrives, she defiantly insists on accompanying Christopher on the patrol boat. Sometime later, Tricky now manages his own luxury apartment complex with Katy in Miami, which Mary, now his investor, has purchased on his behalf. She announces in a letter delivered to him by Katy that she will visit in a few months' time to check on the status of their investment, but is progressing past her experiences with Christopher, vowing never to forget him for as long as she is alive.

== Cast ==
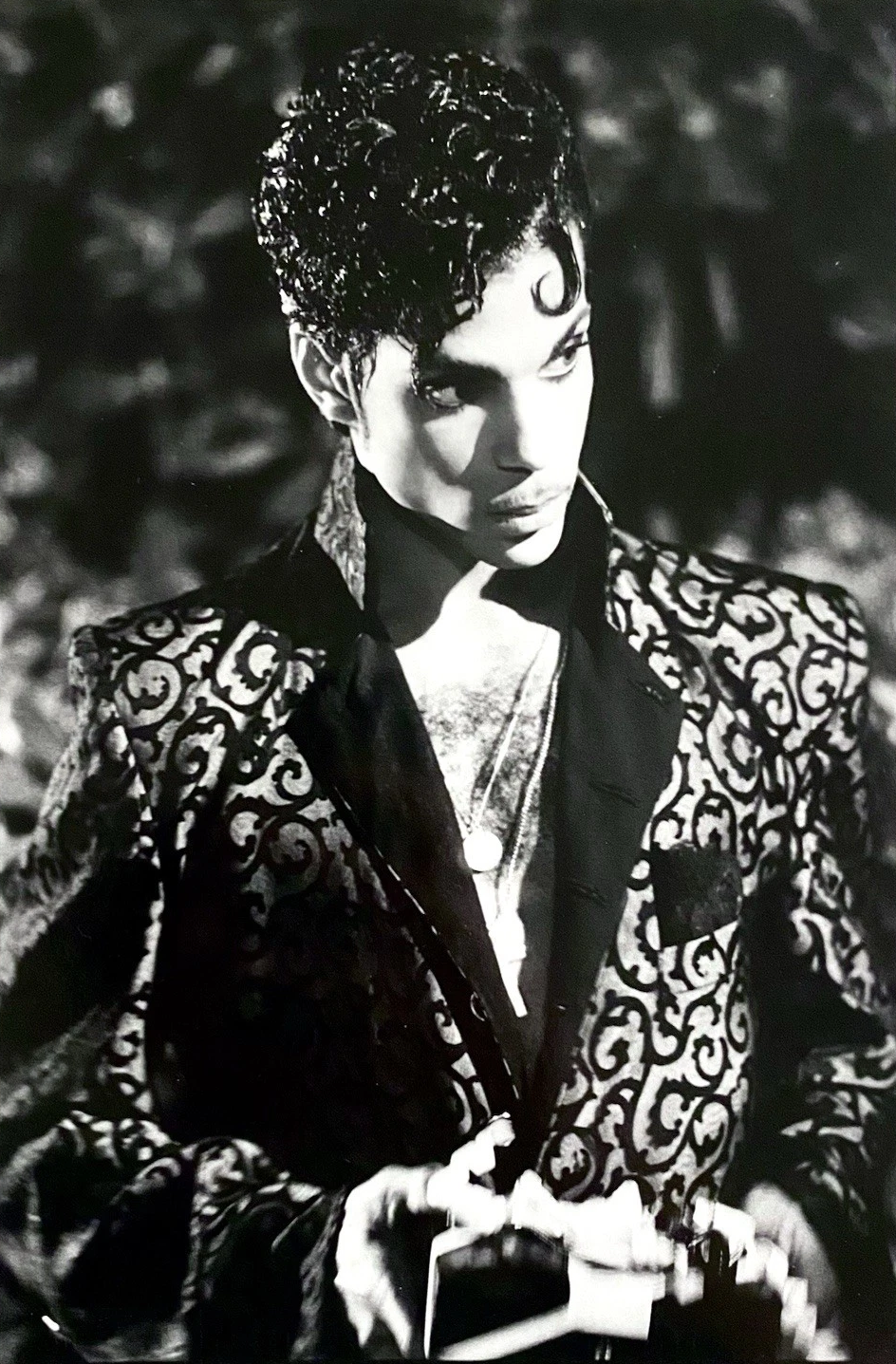
Prince in a promotional photo as Christopher Tracy

- Prince as Christopher Tracy
- Jerome Benton as Tricky
- Kristin Scott Thomas as Mary Sharon
- Steven Berkoff as Isaac Sharon, Mary's father and a billionaire shipping magnate
- Emmanuelle Sallet as Katy
- Alexandra Stewart as Mrs. Muriel Sharon, Mary's mother
- Francesca Annis as Mrs. Wellington
- Pamela Ludwig, Barbara Stall, and Karen Geerlings as Girlfriends
- Victor Spinetti, Myriam Tadesse, and Moune De Vivier as The Jaded Three
- John Rico as Mary's Chauffeur

== Production ==
The success of 1984's film Purple Rain saw Prince becoming one of the biggest stars in the world, leading to a blank cheque situation in which Warner Bros. Pictures quickly greenlit Under the Cherry Moon. Prince initially envisioned the setting to be Palm Beach, Miami or Capri, though he soon settled on the French Riviera. Jean-Baptiste Mondino and Martin Scorsese were approached to direct, but ultimately video director Mary Lambert was recruited. German cinematographer Michael Ballhaus was hired as director of photography, and No Wave filmmaker Becky Johnston wrote the screenplay.

Filming started at the Victorine Studios in Nice, France on September 14, 1985. After disagreements about the film's direction, Lambert left the production on November 4, and Prince took over directing himself. Lambert is listed as a creative consultant in the film's credits. Prince was able to take over the production as it was being filmed in Europe and thus did not fall afoul of the Directors Guild of America, who often veto directors being fired in favor of lead performers taking over their duties.

The cast was also changed during pre-production. Prince originally had planned to have Susannah Melvoin (sister of Revolution member Wendy Melvoin, as well as Prince's girlfriend at the time) play Mary Sharon, but it was clear she couldn't act and Prince replaced her with Kristin Scott Thomas (in her feature debut).

Under the Cherry Moon was shot on color stock, then processed into black and white in post-production. None of the color footage has yet emerged with the exception of the music video for "Mountains". The film's black and white poster was designed by art director John Kosh.

== Soundtrack ==
Under the Cherry Moon, along with its soundtrack album, marked the first of many recorded collaborations between Prince and jazz keyboardist/composer-arranger Clare Fischer, whose orchestral arrangements had by this time become highly demanded by pop and R&B acts, stemming from his initial arrangements for Rufus and Chaka Khan in the early 1970s. Appearing in the credits as "Orchestra Composed and Arranged by...", Fischer's contribution was further acknowledged by Prince in both the film's closing titles and the album's liner notes: "With special thanks 2 Clare Fischer 4 making brighter the colors black and white".

The film also includes several pieces of music that were not on the Parade album. The opening introduction scene features a piano accompaniment (later credited as "An Honest Man" although it is not related to the a cappella track of the same name included on the Crystal Ball compilation). The scene where Mary and Christopher Tracy (Prince) dance on the restaurant balcony was accompanied by "Alexa de Paris", later featured as a B-side on the 1986 release of "Mountains" and Prince's 1994 single "Letitgo". The single release of "Kiss" includes "Love or Money", which is featured later in the film as Tricky (Jerome Benton) and Christopher go on a shopping spree with Mary. Excerpts from the opening of Jill Jones's single "Mia Bocca" are included during the scenes at Mary's birthday party. The song "Old Friends 4 Sale" is featured near the end of the movie and would later lend its name to an outtakes album released in 1999 which also featured it in a more orchestrated version than the original (The Vault: Old Friends 4 Sale)

== Reception ==
=== Box office ===
Under the Cherry Moon did not gain any breakout audience, despite much pre-publicity including a special MTV premiere in Sheridan, Wyoming. It was held there after fan Lisa Barber won a contest to have the film shown in her hometown. The film earned $3,150,924 in its opening weekend from 976 venues, ranking #11 at the domestic box office (according to the Daily Variety chart), and the fourth-highest among the weekend's new releases. At the end of its run, the film's final domestic gross was $10,090,429.

=== Initial critical response ===
At time of release, the film received generally negative reviews from critics.

Siskel & Ebert gave the film "Two Thumbs Down" on their review show, later including it on their "Worst of 1986" list, with Roger Ebert commenting that "the film achieves a nice glossy black and white look and then never figures out what to do with it," adding that, perhaps, Prince was "attempting to combine an old Fred Astaire film with a perfume commercial." Walter Goodman in the Daily Times-Advocate called the screenplay "an adolescent's notion of sophisticated badinage." Trevor Dann in The Sunday Telegraph said Prince was "out of his depth as an actor, though too arrogant, one suspects, to understand why." Kevin Lally in the Courier-News called the film one of the worst of the year, "the kind of embarrassment that makes your mouth gape", adding that viewing Nice in black and white was akin to watching Lawrence of Arabia on a Sony Watchman. Richard Freedman in The Jersey Journal said the film was only for the audience who wanted to see "98 minutes of Prince pouting and primping."

Tom Sabulis in the Evening Express conceded the film had "(successfully) evoked an aura of nostalgia for the Hollywood movies of the 1940s... in glorious black and white", but concluded it was an "illogical, confusing and formless mish-mash" and "an annoying exercise in narcissism." Kelly Scott reviewed the film negatively but said it had some positive "disarmingly amateurish" elements, comparing the overall aesthetic to Marx Brothers films about the "mindless rich", and romances starring Ginger Rogers and Fred Astaire.

One dissenting perspective came from Joe Baltake, who considered Under the Cherry Moon "the boldest, most unique film of the summer" with a "timelessness, a feeling of being out-of-place with itself, that is hugely affecting." He also compared Prince and Benton's dynamic to that of Marilyn Monroe and Jane Russell in Gentlemen Prefer Blondes. Baltake went on:

It's several movies - part Antonioni, part Howard Hawks, part Andy Warhol, part whatzit - all jumbled together and based on the mental landscape of its kinetic, eccentric, self-consciously lascivious star. I've seen Under the Cherry Moon. I enjoyed it enormously, but I haven't quite figured out what it's supposed to be.

=== Twenty-first century views and re-evaluation ===
On Rotten Tomatoes, the film holds an approval rating of 40% based on 40 reviews, with an average rating of 4.1/10. The site's consensus states: "Under the Cherry Moon may satisfy the most rabid Prince fans, but everyone else will be better served with this vanity project's far superior soundtrack." Metacritic, which uses a weighted average, assigned the film a score of 36 out of 100, based on 16 critics, indicating "generally unfavorable" reviews.

Prince reflected on the film somewhat negatively in a 1990 interview with Rolling Stone discussing his upcoming movie Graffiti Bridge, stating: "I don’t regret anything about Under the Cherry Moon. I learned that I can’t direct what I didn’t write."

However, following Prince's death in 2016, several critics reappraised Under the Cherry Moon in a more positive light.

Peter Sobczynski, writing for Roger Ebert's website, declared it "an offbeat gem" and compared it to Marcel L'Herbier's 1924 film L'Inhumaine. Blake Goble, writing for Consequence, deemed the film a "cult classic... that unexpectedly endures" and compared it to Casablanca and The Third Man. Mark Asch in Brooklyn Magazine declared the film "an inspired, delightful piece of cinema, cloudcuckooland escapism, a luxuriant, swishy appropriation of Golden Age dreaminess with a dollop of wide-eyed 80s consumerist wonderment and mystical messianic streak, and very much of a piece with Prince's genius."

Alexandra Heller-Nicholas, writing for SBS On Demand, called the film "a cinematic manifestation of Prince's impish smile come to life, played out on screen in 100 glorious (but not always coherent) minutes", comparing it to Frederico Fellini's 8½. Nancy Jo Sales, writing for Air Mail, compared the film to It Happened One Night and My Man Godfrey, declaring it "a riff on the sort of frothy screwball comedies directed by Ernst Lubitsch and Preston Sturges (turning) the screwball-comedy paradigm on its head—starting by casting a gender-bending, self-styled sexy motherfucker who happens to be Black as its romantic lead."

Sobczynski, Goble, Asch and Sales all suggested that the film's initial negative critical reception may have been due to audiences expecting something more similar to Purple Rain. In another positive review from 2016, Jason Bailey in Flavorwire opined that film critics in 1986 "(did not seem) to understand that it's a silly film, purposefully so, and tried to use their prose to laugh at the film, as if Prince weren't laughing way ahead of them. He was telling the joke."

=== Home media ===
Under the Cherry Moon was first released on DVD on February 8, 2005. The film was released on Blu-ray for the first time on October 4, 2016, separately in a purple case and as part of the Prince Movie Collection.

=== Accolades ===
Accolades for Under the Cherry Moon
| Award | Category | Nominee(s) | Result | Ref. |
|---|---|---|---|---|
| Golden Raspberry Awards | Worst Picture | Robert Cavallo, Joseph Ruffalo and Steven Fargnoli | Won (Note: Tied with Howard the Duck.) | |
| Golden Raspberry Awards | Worst Director | Prince | Won | |
| Golden Raspberry Awards | Worst Actor | Prince | Won | |
| Golden Raspberry Awards | Worst Supporting Actor | Jerome Benton | Won | |
| Golden Raspberry Awards | Worst Supporting Actress | Kristin Scott Thomas | Nominated | |
| Golden Raspberry Awards | Worst New Star | Kristin Scott Thomas | Nominated | |
| Golden Raspberry Awards | Worst Screenplay | Becky Johnston | Nominated | |
| Golden Raspberry Awards | Worst Original Song | "Love or Money"; Music and Lyrics by Prince and the Revolution | Won | |
| Stinkers Bad Movie Awards | Worst Picture | Robert Cavallo, Joseph Ruffalo and Steven Fargnoli | Nominated | |
