= Kiss (Prince song) =

1986 single by Prince and the Revolution

- US 7-inch single

Single by Prince and the Revolution

from the album Parade
- B-side: "♥ or $"
- Released: February 5, 1986
- Recorded: April 27–28, 1985
- Studio: Sunset Sound, Hollywood
- Genre: Funk; pop; minimalist
- Length: 3:38 (album version); 3:46 (single/video version); 7:16 (extended version)
- Label: Paisley Park; Warner Bros.
- Songwriter: Prince
- Producer: Prince

Prince and the Revolution singles chronology
"America" (1985)	"Kiss" (1986)	"Mountains" (1986)

Music video
- "Kiss" on YouTube

"Kiss" is a song by American musician Prince. Released by the Paisley Park label as the lead single from Prince and the Revolution's eighth studio album, Parade, on February 5, 1986. It was a No. 1 hit, holding the top spot of the US Billboard Hot 100 chart for two weeks. The single was certified gold in 1986 for shipments of 1,000,000 copies by RIAA.

The song is ranked No. 85 on the Rolling Stone list of the 500 Greatest Songs of All Time in 2021, No. 464 in 2010, and No. 461 in 2004. NME ranked the song at No. 4 in their list of The 150 Greatest Singles of All Time, and voted "Kiss" the best single of 1986.

Following Prince's death in April 2016, the song re-charted on the Billboard Hot 100 at No. 28, and jumped to No. 23 a week later. The song also reached No. 2 on the French Singles Chart. As of April 30, 2016, it had sold 1.33 million digital copies in the U.S.

Age of Chance and Art of Noise also released versions of the song that were critical and chart successes.

== Development, production and release ==
"Kiss" started as a rough acoustic demo, with a verse and chorus written by Prince. He gave his demo to the funk band Mazarati who asked Prince to write a song for their debut album. The band worked on it with producer David Z at Sunset Sound Studio 2, while Prince was busy working in the studio next to them, Studio 3. Z recalls having one of the band members play a piano part inspired by Bo Diddley's song "Say Man". In the Sound On Sound article for "Kiss", he recalled programming the song's beat on a LinnDrum drum machine, but in the Mixonline article he refers to a Linn 9000. However, it's unlikely either of them were used as the drums sound more like the LM-1, Prince's usual drum machine.

In the end, Prince decided to finish the song. He retained David Z's unique, funky rhythm and used background vocal arrangements by Mazarati's Bruce DeShazer and Marvin Gunn. David Z recounts how the band had expected a songwriting credit, and were "pissed" when it did not materialise. Prince removed the bass line, and added the signature guitar and falsetto vocal. For the distinctive "ah-wah-ah" backing vocals, David Z adapted vocals by Brenda Lee - one of the biggest US chart toppers in the Sixties - from her 1959/1960 hit "Sweet Nothin's", a single from her eponymous album. To make up for the absence of a traditional bass guitar or synth bass line, the bass drum was emphasized by processing through AMS RMX-16 reverb unit. The underlying "keyboard chop" in the background is an acoustic guitar (played by David Z.) run through a Kepex noise gate triggered by the hi-hat track on the multitrack tape - this effect, however, was rather difficult to recreate live on keyboards. Warner Bros. were skepitical about the final version of the minimalist song, but upon Prince's insistence, the song was released and added to Parade.

Despite Warner Bros. not wanting to release it as a single, "Kiss" became Prince's third number-one US hit, following "When Doves Cry" and "Let's Go Crazy" both from 1984. "Kiss" was an intenational hit, reaching number 6 on the UK Singles Chart. The song won Prince another Grammy Award for Best R&B Performance by a Duo or Group with Vocals, and was nominated for a Grammy Award for Best R&B Song. The song became a staple at Prince's concerts and was usually sung partially by the audience.

The 12-inch single of the song is an extension of the album track. The extended section is based on the funky guitar line and contains much fuller instrumentation than the main track, including bass guitar, organ and horns. New lyrics are present from Prince, along with Jill Jones, that end with a humorous dialogue between a wife and her husband watching Prince on television. The B-side of "Kiss" was "♥ or $" ("Love or Money"), sung in a processed, higher-pitched vocal, which Prince would later use for his Camille material. The song relates to the theme in Under the Cherry Moon, and a bit of the song was heard in the film, as was a bit of the extended version of "Kiss". The extended "Kiss" was included on 2006's Ultimate; "♥ or $" was re-released as a digital B-side on iTunes.

Revolution bassist Brownmark claims to have co-written the song with Prince: he most likely wrote the second verse as the first verse was on the demo Prince provided himself and Mazarati with to work from. Brownmark claims he was promised a songwriting credit by Prince, but never got credit or royalties.

=== Composition ===
The song is written in the key of A minor (utilizing the Dorian mode) and has a tempo of 112 beats per minute in common time.

== Critical reception ==
Robert Hilburn from Los Angeles Times wrote, "The single combines an ever-so-cool update of a classic James Brown guitar-accented funk riff with witty lyrics that suggest a bit more humility in Prince's sexually aggressive posture. You don't have to be rich to be my girl, he advises. You don't have to be cool to rule my world. Even the put-downs are tinged with humor: Act your age, not your shoe size, he tells one prospective lover."

== Music video ==
The accompanying music video for "Kiss" was filmed on February 13, 1986, at Laird International Studios in Culver City, California, and directed by Rebecca Blake. Prince appears in a half shirt and leather jacket and then shirtless and performs dance choreography in a hall. The trousers he wears are strip-off pants. He is accompanied by the veiled dancer Monique Mannen wearing black lingerie and sunglasses while Revolution member Wendy Melvoin sits playing guitar.

== Legacy ==
"Kiss" is widely considered one of Prince's finest songs. In 2016, Paste ranked the song number two on their list of the 50 greatest Prince songs, and in 2022, American Songwriter ranked the song number three on their list of the 10 greatest Prince songs.

In 2022, it was included in the list "The story of NME in 70 (mostly) seminal songs", at number 28: Mark Beaumont wrote that with this song, "Prince took his crown while the Hip-Hop Wars raged".

The "Kiss" video was parodied by Australian band The Go-Betweens in their video for the song "Head Full of Steam", with Robert Forster dressing in a Prince-like midriff-exposing top and Grant McLennan playing guitar in drag ala Melvoin.

== Track listings ==
- 7-inch single
1. "Kiss" – 3:46
2. "♥ or $" – 3:57
- 12-inch single
1. "Kiss" (extended version) – 7:16
2. "♥ or $" (extended version) – 6:50
- CD single
1. "Kiss" (extended version) – 7:16
2. "Girls & Boys" – 5:30
3. "Under the Cherry Moon" – 2:57

== Personnel ==
Credits from Duane Tudahl, Benoît Clerc, Guitarcloud and Prince Vault

- Prince – lead and backing vocals, electric guitar
- Bruce DeShazer (a.k.a. Tony Christian) – backing vocals
- Marr Star – backing vocals, keyboards (uncredited)
- Craig "Screamer" Powell - backing vocals
- Aaron Paul "Ace" Keith - backing vocals, keyboards (uncredited)
- Eric Leeds - horns on extended version
- Jill Jones - spoken word on extended version
- Kevin "Blondie" Patricks - drums (uncredited)
- David Z. – acoustic guitar, Yamaha DX7, Linn LM-1, Linn 9000

== Charts ==
=== Weekly charts ===
Weekly chart performance for "Kiss"
Chart (1986–1987)	Peak position
Australia (Kent Music Report)	2
Austria (Ö3 Austria Top 40)	8
Belgium (Ultratop 50 Flanders)	3
Belgium (VRT Top 30 Flanders)	4
Canada (CHUM)	4
Canada Top Singles (RPM)	6
Europe (European Hot 100 Singles)	6
Finland (Suomen virallinen lista)	8
France (SNEP)	29
Ireland (IRMA)	11
Italy (Musica e dischi)	11
Luxembourg (Radio Luxembourg)	3
Netherlands (Dutch Top 40)	2
Netherlands (Single Top 100)	3
New Zealand (Recorded Music NZ)	2
Norway (VG-lista)	10
South Africa (Springbok Radio)	10
Sweden (Sverigetopplistan)	16
Switzerland (Schweizer Hitparade)	3
UK Singles (Official Charts)	6
US Billboard Hot 100	1
US Dance Club Songs (Billboard) Remix with "Love or Money"	1
US Dance Singles Sales (Billboard) Remix with "Love or Money"	1
US Hot R&B/Hip-Hop Songs (Billboard)	1
US Cash Box Top 100	1
West Germany (GfK)	4

1988 weekly chart performance for "Kiss"
Chart (1988)	Peak position
UK Singles (Official Charts)	76

2013 weekly chart performance for "Kiss"
Chart (2013)	Peak position
France (SNEP)	89

2016 weekly chart performance for "Kiss"
Chart (2016)	Peak position
Australia (ARIA)	27
Austria (Ö3 Austria Top 40)	21
Canada Hot 100 (Billboard)	43
France (SNEP)	2
Germany (GfK)	29
Ireland (IRMA)	98
Scottish Singles Sales (Official Charts)	9
Spain (Promusicae)	9
Switzerland (Schweizer Hitparade)	11
UK Singles (Official Charts)	38
US Billboard Hot 100	23
US Hot R&B/Hip-Hop Songs (Billboard)	12

=== Year-end charts ===
Year-end chart performance for "Kiss"
Chart (1986)	Position
Australia (Kent Music Report)	25
Belgium (Ultratop)	30
Canada Top Singles (RPM)	57
Europe (European Hot 100 Singles)	23
Netherlands (Dutch Top 40)	23
Netherlands (Single Top 100)	20
New Zealand (RIANZ)	14
Switzerland (Schweizer Hitparade)	22
US Billboard Hot 100	19
US 12-inch Singles Sales (Billboard)	7
US Dance/Disco Club Play (Billboard)	20
US Hot Black Singles (Billboard)	6
West Germany (Media Control)	28

== Certifications ==
Certifications for "Kiss"
Region	Certification	Certified units/sales
Denmark (IFPI Danmark)	Gold	45,000^{‡}
Germany (BVMI)	Gold	300,000^{‡}
Italy (FIMI) sales since 2009	Gold	25,000^{‡}
New Zealand (RMNZ)	2× Platinum	60,000^{‡}
Spain (Promusicae)	Gold	30,000^{‡}
United Kingdom (BPI)	Platinum	600,000^{‡}
United States (RIAA) 1986 physical sales	Gold	1,000,000^{^}
United States digital sales	—	1,330,336
^{^} Shipments figures based on certification alone.^{‡} Sales+streaming figures based on certification alone.

== Age of Chance version ==
"Kiss"
- Fon 12-inch sleeve by the Designers Republic, orange printing

Single by Age of Chance

from the album Beneath the Pavements the Dancefloor
- B-side: "Crash Conscious"
- Released: November 1986
- Studio: Fon, Sheffield
- Length: 3:04
- Label: Fon; Virgin (outside UK)
- Songwriter: Prince

Age of Chance singles chronology
"Bible of the Beats" (1986)	"Kiss" (1986)	"Who's Afraid of the Big Bad Noise" (1987)

Music video
- "Kiss" on YouTube

An industrial cover of the song was released in November 1986 by Age of Chance. Bass player Geoff Taylor described it as: "We basically removed the sex and replaced it with lump hammers."

The band worked out the music from hearing it in clubs and consulted Smash Hits for the lyrics, although they changed them substantially.

The band first recorded the track for a Peel session in June 1986, when the Prince version was still in the UK charts. They were inspired by the Fire Engines having covered Heaven 17's "(We Don't Need This) Fascist Groove Thang" for their first Peel session while that song was still in the charts. John Peel got many listener requests to play Age of Chance's version of "Kiss" again, and it made No. 2 in Peel's Festive Fifty for 1986.

The single version was recorded at Chakk's Fon Studios in Sheffield and released on the Fon label in the UK in November 1986. Its success led to a contract with Virgin Records, who released the single in the rest of the world.

The single was accompanied by a video which received some airplay on MTV in the United States.

The sleeve was one of the first major productions by The Designers Republic, helping make their reputation. It was available in white, pink, orange or green.

The band recorded a remix called "Kisspower" with Alan Smyth of Fon Studios in November 1986, using Fon's Akai S900 sampler. It included samples from the Prince original, Bruce Springsteen, Run–D.M.C. and other artists. Virgin wanted to release it but it was vetoed by Simon Draper of Virgin America over copyright concerns. It was eventually released as a run of 500 white label promotional copies. If released, it would have been one of the first mainstream sample-based singles, six months before "Pump Up the Volume" and "Say Kids What Time Is It?". "Kisspower" was acclaimed as a "landmark" and a "cut'n'paste trailblazer" by musician's magazine Electronic Sound.

=== Critical response ===
On release, the single achieved Single Of The Week in Sounds November 15, 1986, which described it as "The first white band on an independent label to deliver a record that successfully crosses the alertness of hip hop and electro" and emphasised the quality of the artwork.

Greil Marcus in The Village Voice March 10, 1987, called it a "trash masterpiece ... Instant party, with an edge of menace."

Simon Reynolds described the single in Blissed Out: The Raptures of Rock as "anti-anti-pop, a gesture against indie stasis."

=== Track listings ===
- 7-inch (Fon AGE-5) (Virgin VS-951)

A. "Kiss" – 3:04
B. "Crash Conscious" (Elvidge/Howson/Perry/Taylor) – 2:54

- 12-inch (Fon AGE-T-5) (Virgin VS-951-12)

A. "Kiss" – 3:06
B1. "Kiss" (Collision Cut) remixed by Crush Commander – 4:11
B2. "Crash Conscious" – 2:55

- 12-inch Jack-Knife Remixes (Fon AGE-L-5)

A. "Kiss" (Sonic Crush Symphony) remixed by D.J. Chakk
B1. "Kiss" (Your Move America) remixed by D.J. Chakk
B2. "Kiss" (Leeds V The Bronx) remixed by D.J. Chakk
B3. "Crash Conscious"

- 12-inch "Kisspower" (Fon AGE-X-5) (promo)

A. "Kisspower" – 6:55
B. "Kisspower" – 6:55

=== Chart performance ===
The single reached No. 1 on the UK Indie Chart in late 1986. It spent 11 weeks on the mainstream pop charts in the United Kingdom, starting on December 6, 1986, and peaking at No. 50 in early 1987.

In New Zealand it charted for four weeks, peaking at No. 21.

In the United States, it spent six weeks on the Billboard Dance Club Play chart, peaking at No. 35 on May 23, 1987.

== The Art of Noise featuring Tom Jones version ==
"Kiss"
- UK 7-inch sleeve

Single by Art of Noise featuring Tom Jones

from the album The Best of The Art of Noise
- B-side: "E.F.L."
- Released: October 10, 1988
- Recorded: 1987
- Genre: Electronic
- Length: 3:30
- Label: Polydor
- Songwriter: Prince
- Producers: Anne Dudley; J. J. Jeczalik

Art of Noise singles chronology
"Dragnet (The '88 Mix)" (1988)	"Kiss" (1988)	"Paranoimia '89" (1989)

Tom Jones singles chronology
"I Was Born to Be Me" (1987)	"Kiss" (1988)	"Move Closer" (1989)

Music video
- "Kiss" on YouTube

In 1988, British synth-pop group the Art of Noise released a cover of the song, featuring Welsh singer Tom Jones on vocals. Jones had added the song to his Vegas live show and the Art of Noise contacted him after seeing him perform it on TV.

The song became the band's biggest hit to that point, reaching No. 5 on the UK Singles Chart (higher than the original in that country), the top 10 in several other countries and No. 18 on the US Dance chart. It was also No. 1 in New Zealand and Spain.

The song alternates between two distinct rhythms: a fast-paced 4/4 rock beat, panned entirely to the left channel; and a half-speed quiet storm-inspired percussion section. The guitar and horns break in the middle of the track musically references the themes to Dragnet and Peter Gunn (two songs the Art of Noise covered with much commercial success) as well as their own breakthrough hit, "Close (to the Edit)" and "Paranoimia", their 1986 collaboration with Max Headroom. Jones changes the lyric line of "Women, Not Girls rule my world" to "Women and Girls, rule my world."

This version was later included as part of an episode of the series Listed on MuchMoreMusic, which was on the top 20 cover songs. It can also be heard during the main title sequence of the film My Stepmother Is an Alien as well as a scene in Kids in the Hall: Brain Candy.

=== Track listings ===
- 7-inch single
1. "Kiss" – 3:30
2. "E.F.L." (the Art of Noise) – 5:15
- 12-inch single
1. "Kiss" (the battery mix) – 8:17
2. "Kiss" (7-inch version) – 3:30
3. "E.F.L." – 5:15
- CD single
1. "Kiss" (7-inch version) – 3:30
2. "E.F.L." (the Art of Noise) – 5:15
3. "Kiss" (the battery mix) – 8:17

=== Charts ===
==== Weekly charts ====
Weekly chart performance for "Kiss" by Art of Noise
Chart (1988–1989)	Peak position
Australia (ARIA)	8
Austria (Ö3 Austria Top 40)	4
Belgium (Ultratop 50 Flanders)	5
Finland (Suomen virallinen lista)	14
Ireland (IRMA)	8
Italy Airplay (Music & Media)	3
Luxembourg (Radio Luxembourg)	2
Netherlands (Dutch Top 40)	5
Netherlands (Single Top 100)	6
New Zealand (Recorded Music NZ)	1
Norway (VG-lista)	8
Spain (AFYVE)	1
Sweden (Sverigetopplistan)	5
Switzerland (Schweizer Hitparade)	11
UK Singles (Official Charts)	5
US Billboard Hot 100	31
US Alternative Airplay (Billboard)	14
US Dance Club Songs (Billboard)	18
US Dance Singles Sales (Billboard)	13
West Germany (GfK)	16

==== Year-end charts ====
1988 year-end chart performance for "Kiss" by Art of Noise
Chart (1988)	Position
Belgium (Ultratop)	57
Netherlands (Dutch Top 40)	49
Netherlands (Single Top 100)	73

1989 year-end chart performance for "Kiss" by Art of Noise
Chart (1989)	Position
Australia (ARIA)	41
West Germany (Media Control)	69

== Other versions ==
The song has been covered by more than 60 artists ranging from pop (Anna Kidd, Mikayla Ayres) to soul (Jeff Michel) and jazz (Aleksandra Crossan).
