= Parade (Prince album) =

1986 soundtrack album

Studio album / soundtrack album by Prince and the Revolution
- Released: March 31, 1986
- Recorded: April 17, 1985 – early 1986
- Studios: Washington Avenue Warehouse, Edina, Minnesota; Sunset Sound, Hollywood, California
- Genres: Psychedelic pop; funk; R&B; soul; jazz; baroque pop
- Length: 40:57
- Labels: Paisley Park; Warner Bros.
- Producer: Prince

Prince chronology
Around the World in a Day (1985)	Parade (1986)	Sign o' the Times (1987)

The Revolution chronology
Around the World in a Day (1985)	Parade (1986)

Singles from Parade
- 1. "Kiss" Released: February 5, 1986; 2. "Mountains" Released: May 7, 1986; 3. "Anotherloverholenyohead" Released: July 2, 1986; 4. "Girls & Boys" Released: August 4, 1986 (EU)

Parade is the eighth studio album by American recording artist Prince, and the third and final album where the Revolution is billed. It also was the soundtrack album to the 1986 film Under the Cherry Moon, directed by and starring Prince. It was released on March 31, 1986, by Paisley Park Records and Warner Bros. Records. Parade eschews the guitar and rock elements of Prince's 1984 album Purple Rain in favor of the psychedelic pop style he explored on Around the World in a Day (1985), austerely produced funk, and soundtrack compositions.

After the critical disappointment of Prince's 1985 album Around the World in a Day, Parade was released to acclaim from music critics. It charted at number 3 on the US Billboard 200 and reached the top 5 in five other countries. "Kiss" reached number one on the Billboard Hot 100. Parade was certified platinum by the Recording Industry Association of America (RIAA) less than three months after its release. It went on to be named one of the best albums of 1986 by The Village Voice, whilst NME named it their Album of the Year.

== Music and lyrics ==
Parade eschews the guitar and rock elements of Prince's 1984 album Purple Rain in favor of the neo-psychedelic style he explored on Around the World in a Day (1985), austerely produced funk, and soundtrack compositions. According to Blender magazine's Keith Harris, Parade "makes a pop cavalcade out of the same psychedelic affectations" of Around the World in a Day. Robert Christgau of The Village Voice viewed it as a modern "fusion of Fresh's foundation and Sgt. Pepper's filigrees", with songs he described as baroque pop creations. According to PopMatters editor Quentin B. Huff, "Parade doesn't sound like anything else in the Prince canon. The album is a blend of jazz, soul, and a certain French undercurrent, probably absorbed from the film being set in France."

Parade is bookended by two songs—"Christopher Tracy's Parade" and "Sometimes It Snows in April"—that reference Christopher Tracy, the protagonist from Under the Cherry Moon. The latter song is an acoustic ballad with chromatic choruses and sentimental lyrics bidding farewell to Tracy. Christgau wrote that the album's lyrics suggest that Prince sings as Tracy, although he cannot be certain. Parade also features some French lyrics and chanson arrangements, which refer to the film's French setting.

== Release and reception ==
Professional ratings
Review scores
Source	Rating
AllMusic	4.5/5 stars
Blender	4/5 stars
Chicago Sun-Times	3/4 stars
Entertainment Weekly	C−
The Guardian	5/5 stars
Hi-Fi News & Record Review	A
Pitchfork	9.1/10
The Rolling Stone Album Guide	4.5/5 stars
Spin Alternative Record Guide	7/10
The Village Voice	A−

Parade was released on March 31, 1986, to acclaim from music critics, who viewed it as a creative comeback after the critical disappointment of Around the World in a Day. In a contemporary review for The New York Times, John Rockwell said that the album succeeds in part because of the more aggressive songs, "in which Prince chooses to play up the black side of his multifaceted musical sensibility." The Sunday Times found its musical scope "stunning", and the Detroit Free Press called the album "a confirmation of Prince's place as a superior melodist, arranger, and player, as well as a celebration of his creativity." Hi-Fi News & Record Review called songs such as "New Position" and "Girls and Boys" well-crafted funk and said that "when Prince opts to go completely daft, as he does on 'Do U Lie'... even then the result is somehow endearing and instantly likeable."

Commercially, Parade charted at number 3 on the pop chart and at number 2 on the R&B chart, while selling 1 million copies in the United States. It also garnered him a new commercial audience in Europe and sold 2 million copies internationally. The album finished 25th in the voting for The Village Voice's annual Pazz & Jop critics poll. Christgau, the poll's creator, ranked it as the 33rd best album of the year on his own list. NME magazine named it their album of the year for 1986.

In a retrospective review for AllMusic, Stephen Thomas Erlewine viewed Parade as a musically diverse near-masterpiece that is given depth by Prince's "weird religious and sexual metaphors". Simon Price later wrote in The Guardian that it was "the sound of Prince at his most effortless and assured. Cohesive and ice cream-cool, nobody would guess it was a soundtrack for a (sub-par) film. And it has 'Kiss' on it." In a less enthusiastic review for Entertainment Weekly, David Browne said the record's ornate ballads and inconsistent material made it more self-indulgent than Around the World in a Day. According to Mosi Reeves of Rhapsody, Prince's die-hard fans viewed the album as a charming mix of funk, jazz, and pop rock styles, but some detractors felt that its music was overblown. Reeves himself said that "this stylistic departure is an anomaly". In rapper Chuck D's opinion, Prince "turned off a lot of the black followers [with the album]. I couldn't understand that. People don't want artists to endlessly repeat themselves, yet they can't tolerate change either. Prince changes all the time, always working on the public's imagination, always trying to keep ahead of them."

== Track listing ==
All tracks are written by Prince, except where noted.

Side one: Intro
No.	Title	Writer(s)	Length
1.	"Christopher Tracy's Parade"	Prince; John L. Nelson	2:11
2.	"New Position"		2:20
3.	"I Wonder U"		1:39
4.	"Under the Cherry Moon"	Prince; J. Nelson	2:57
5.	"Girls & Boys"		5:29
6.	"Life Can Be So Nice"		3:13
7.	"Venus de Milo"		1:55
Total length:			19:44

Side two: End
No.	Title	Writer(s)	Length
8.	"Mountains"	Prince; Lisa Coleman; Wendy Melvoin	3:57
9.	"Do U Lie?"		2:44
10.	"Kiss"		3:37
11.	"Anotherloverholenyohead"		4:00
12.	"Sometimes It Snows in April"	Prince; Coleman; Melvoin	6:48
Total length:			21:06 40:57

== Personnel ==
Adapted from Benoît Clerc, Ronin Ro, and Guitarcloud

=== Musicians ===
- Prince – lead vocals (tracks 1–2, 4–6, 8–12), backing vocals (tracks 1–2, 5–6, 8–11), electric guitar (tracks 1, 3, 5, 8–11), Roland G-707 (tracks 5, 11), acoustic guitar (tracks 1, 10), bass (tracks 1–4, 9, 11), drums (tracks 1–4, 6), electric drums (track 6), programming (tracks 1–4, 6, 11), finger snapping (track 1), steel drums (track 2), zills (tracks 4–5), claps (track 11), synthesizers (tracks 1, 3–4, 6, 9), piano (tracks 4, 7, 11)
- Lisa Coleman – backing vocals (tracks 1–3, 5–6, 8–9, 12), synthesizers (tracks 5, 8), piano (track 12)
- Susannah Melvoin – backing vocals (tracks 1, 5, 11)
- Wendy Melvoin – lead vocals (track 3), backing vocals (tracks 1–2, 5–6, 8–9, 12), electric guitar (tracks 5, 8), acoustic guitar (track 12)
- Brownmark – backing vocals (tracks 5, 8), bass (tracks 5, 8)
- Sheila E. – backing vocals (track 5), bells (track 6), drums (track 7)
- Doctor Fink – synthesizers (tracks 5, 8)
- Marie France Drouin – spoken vocals (credited as "The French Seduction") (track 5)
- Eric Leeds – saxophone (tracks 5, 8), baritone saxophone (track 5)
- Bobby Z. – drums (tracks 5, 8), electric drums (tracks 5, 8)
- Atlanta Bliss – trumpet (track 8)
- Miko Weaver – electric guitar (track 8)
- Sandra Francisco (credited as "Little Gipsy Girl") – spoken vocals (track 9)
- Jonathan Melvoin – drums (track 9)
- Tony Christian, Marr Starr (of Mazarati) – backing vocals (track 10)
- David Z. – Linn 9000 (track 10), piano (track 10)
- Orchestra (tracks 1, 3–4, 7, 9, 11)
  - Mari Botnick, Oscar Chausow, Ron Clark, Isabelle Daskoff, Assa Drori, Henry Ferber, Pam Gates, Janice Gower, Endre Granat, Ed Green, Reginald Hill, Bill Hybel, William Hymanson, Pat Johnson, Karen Jones, Betty Moor, Irma Neumann, Donald Palmer, Sheldon Sanov, Joseph Schoenbrun, Terry Schoenbrun, Francine Walsh, Harold Wolf – violin
  - Myer Bello, Alan DeVeritch, Norman Forrest, Pamela Goldsmith, Allan Harshman, Margot MacLaine, Jorge Moraga, Carole Mukogawa, David Stock – alto violin
  - James Arkatov, Ray Kelley, Raphael Kramer, Frederick Seykora – cello
  - Chuck Domanico, Árni Egilsson – upright bass
  - Don Ashworth, Gene Cipriano, Jon Clarke, Dave Edwards, Gary Foster, Jim Kanter, Jack Nimitz, Dick Mitchell – clarinet
  - John Lowe, Joe Soldo, Bob Tricarico – transverse flute
  - Ray Brown, Rich Cooper, Bob Findley, Larry Ford, Bob O'Donnell, Allen Vizzutti – trumpet
  - Garnett Brown, Charles Loper, Morris Repass, Bill Watrous – trombone
  - David Duke, Marni Johnson, Joe Myer, Brian O'Connor, Calvin Smith, James Thatcher – French horn
  - Tommy Johnson – tuba
  - Brent Fischer – timpani, percussion

=== Technical ===
- Prince – producer
- Lisa Coleman, Wendy Melvoin – producers (tracks 2, 7)
- David Z. – producer (track 10), recording engineer (track 10)
- Peggy McCreary – recording engineer (tracks 1–4, 6–7, 10, 12)
- Susan Rogers – recording engineer (tracks 1–6, 8–12)
- David Tickle – recording engineer (tracks 4–5, 7, 9)
- Coke Johnson – recording engineer (tracks 10–11), assistant recording engineer (track 12)
- Mike Kloster – assistant recording engineer (tracks 1, 4)
- Clare Fischer – orchestra arranger (tracks 1, 3–4, 7, 9, 11)

== Charts ==
=== Weekly charts ===
Weekly chart performance for Parade
Chart (1986)	Peak position
Australian Albums Chart	8
Austrian Albums Chart	7
Canadian Albums Chart	11
Dutch Albums Chart	1
Finnish Albums (Suomen virallinen lista)	3
German Albums Chart	6
New Zealand Albums Chart	7
Norwegian Albums Chart	10
Swedish Albums Chart	5
Swiss Albums Chart	2
UK Albums Chart	4
US Billboard 200	3
US Top R&B/Hip-Hop Albums (Billboard)	2
Chart (2016)	Peak position
US Billboard 200	50
US Soundtrack Albums (Billboard)	3

=== Year-end charts ===
Year-end chart performance for Parade
Chart (1986)	Position
US Billboard 200	44
US Top R&B/Hip-Hop Albums	24

== Certifications ==
Certifications for Parade
Region	Certification	Certified units/sales
Austria (IFPI Austria)	Gold	25,000^{*}
Denmark (IFPI Danmark)	Gold	10,000^{‡}
France (SNEP)	Platinum	300,000^{*}
Germany (BVMI)	Gold	250,000^{^}
Netherlands (NVPI)	Platinum	100,000^{^}
Spain (Promusicae)	Gold	50,000^{^}
Switzerland (IFPI Switzerland)	Gold	25,000^{^}
United Kingdom (BPI)	Platinum	300,000^{^}
United States (RIAA)	Platinum	1,000,000^{^}
Summaries
Worldwide	—	4,560,000
^{*} Sales figures based on certification alone.^{^} Shipments figures based on certification alone.^{‡} Sales+streaming figures based on certification alone.
