= Jerome Benton =

American musical performer, dancer, and actor

- Born: September 19, 1962 (age 63)
- Genres: Rock; pop; R&B; soul; funk; funk rock; funk metal; dance
- Occupations: Musician; actor
- Instruments: Vocals; percussion
- Years active: 1981–present
- Labels: Warner Bros.; Paisley Park
- Website: Official Website For Jerome Benton

Jerome Benton (born September 19, 1962) is an American musician and actor, best known for being the dancer, percussionist, and backing vocalist for The Time.

== Career ==
Benton is the brother of The Time bassist Terry Lewis and worked closely with the band behind the scenes in their initial career. During a performance, lead singer Morris Day asked for a mirror. Benton responded by ripping a mirror out of the club's restroom and bringing it on stage for Day to comb his hair. Following the performance, Benton joined the band as a comedic foil to Day, and provided additional backing vocals and percussion.

Benton appeared in the 1984 film Purple Rain with the rest of The Time and assumed the role of Morris Day's bodyguard and valet. He also appeared in Prince's second film Under the Cherry Moon, and in Prince's fourth film Graffiti Bridge. The chemistry between Day and Benton was well received. Although The Time soon dissolved after Day started pursuing a solo career, Prince retained Benton, as well as Jellybean Johnson and Paul Peterson for the short-lived project The Family. In 1986, Benton appeared in the music video for Janet Jackson's "Control" along with Terry Lewis and Jimmy Jam. Benton reunited with The Family on December 13, 2003 for a single charity performance along with other acts formerly associated with Prince.

Benton joined Prince alumnus Jill Jones, Greg Brooks & Wally Safford in Detroit June 2017 for "The Purple Block Party: Prince" sponsored by UrbanOne Station KISS 105.9 in honor of the late performer's birthday.

In January 2018, Benton joined his brother Terry Lewis in support of Super Bowl Live in Minneapolis. Jerome was featured in several performances including fDeluxe The Family, The Time, Morris Day & The Time and Sheila E.

Benton returned to Minneapolis in support of the PRN Alumni Foundation in April 2019. The event featured a performance from Ingrid Chavez with an Author's panel featuring Chris Riemenschneider, Jim Walsh, Allen Beaulieu, Tamar Davis & Duane Tudahl.
