= Miko Weaver =

American guitarist (born 1957)

- Born: Michael Andre Weaver; March 11, 1957; Berkeley, California, U.S.
- Genres: Funk
- Occupation: Musician
- Instrument: Guitar
- Formerly of: Sheila E. Prince; The Revolution

Miko Weaver (born March 11, 1957 in Berkeley, California) is an American guitarist best known for his work with Prince.

Weaver came to Prince's attention when he was a member of Sheila E.'s band. He and some other members of the band joined The Revolution in the studio to record a jam of "I Would Die 4 U" that would later become the song's 12" single. Prince later picked Weaver to provide guitar for his short-lived R&B band, The Family. When The Family dissolved, several members including Weaver were absorbed into The Revolution and participated in the recording of the Parade album, and the accompanying tour (which would be The Revolution's last). When The Revolution disbanded at the end of the tour, many of the newer members, including Weaver, stayed with Prince to become his touring band for the acclaimed Sign o' the Times and Lovesexy tours. Weaver also participated in many studio sessions with Prince during this time.

The band changed lineups in 1989 at the conclusion of the Lovesexy World Tour, however Weaver was retained for the Nude Tour of 1990 and made an appearance in the Graffiti Bridge film. After these ventures, Weaver departed Prince's band. Longtime member Doctor Fink also left at this time and once both were replaced, the band was officially dubbed The New Power Generation.

Weaver later teamed up with actor Eddie Murphy, and gave Murphy guitar lessons. The two formed a band that would play a concert at Montreux Jazz Festival.

Around 1994, Weaver resided in Rotterdam, the Netherlands for a couple of years. During this period he played jams in small local clubs. In 1994 he also recorded some songs in a recording studio in Leiden, the Netherlands with some local musicians and sound engineer Armand Wouters. One track was called "Crazy with sex". The song was a mix of styles, The Time meets Parade with Weaver rapping the lyrics. The same studio also recorded a live concert he gave at Rotown in Rotterdam. A small venue, about 200 people attended. The recorded songs and the concert were never released.

Starting in the 2000s, Weaver resided in Ibiza, Spain, playing small concerts and gigs and also performing occasionally as DJ at some of the islands' hotspots. He switched over to the bass guitar in the last ten years. Miko's guitar and bass skills are on display on fellow Berkeley native Dorian Moor's 2009 single release “Hooked On You”. As of 2026, he lives in the Netherlands.
