= Minneapolis sound =

Subgenre of funk rock

- Stylistic origins: Funk rock; new wave; synth-pop; R&B
- Cultural origins: Late 1970s, Minneapolis, Minnesota, U.S.
- Derivative forms: Dance-pop

Other topics
- Prince

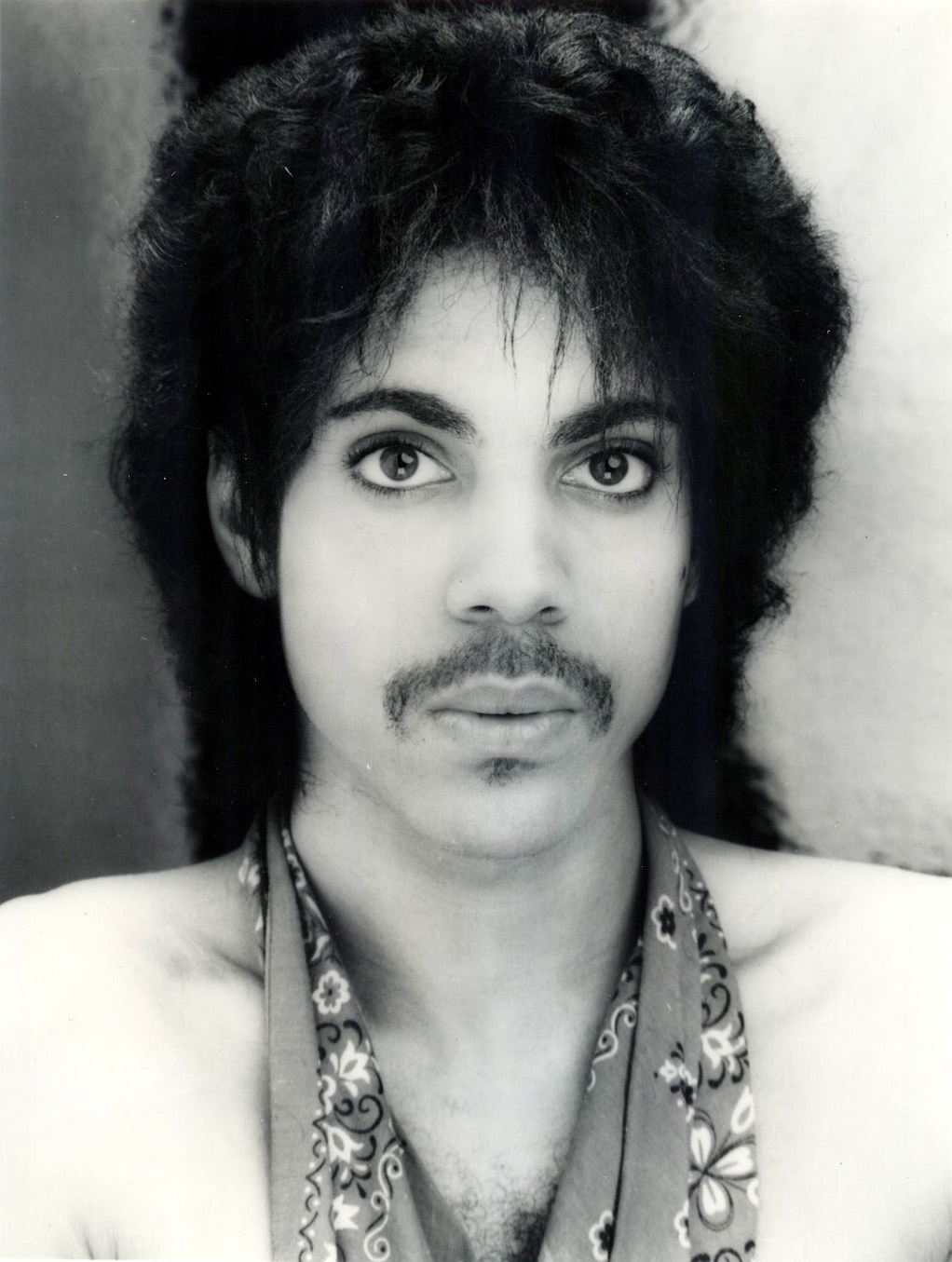
Prince (pictured in 1980) was a pioneer (and arguably the central exponent) of the Minneapolis sound

The Minneapolis sound is a subgenre of popular music which blends elements of funk, new wave, rock, R&B, and synth-pop. The style was chiefly pioneered by the Minneapolis-based musician Prince in the late 1970s. Prince associate and André Cymone and former Lipps Inc. member David Z are also considered central contributors of this music. The musical style's heyday extended through the late 1980s.

With roots in Sound 80 studios and tracks like "Funkytown" by Lipps Inc., the style was often heard at city clubs like First Avenue and was exemplified by Prince-affiliated acts, including the Time, Vanity 6, Apollonia 6, Sheila E., the Family, Wendy & Lisa, Brownmark, Jimmy Jam & Terry Lewis, Morris Day, Jellybean Johnson and Jesse Johnson, and by acts neither affiliated with Prince nor native to Minneapolis, such as Flint, Michigan's Ready for the World.

According to the Rolling Stone Album Guide, "the Minneapolis sound... loomed over mid-'80s R&B and pop, not to mention the next two decades' worth of electro, house, and techno."

== Identifying characteristics ==
While the Minneapolis sound incorporates many of funk's quintessential elements, it bears several distinguishing characteristics:

- Synthesizers generally replace horn sections of trumpets and saxophones, and are used more as accent than as fill or background.
- The rhythm is often faster and generally less syncopated than traditional funk, owing much to new wave music. At the same time, dominant rhythm lines are often accented with repeating percussive fills at fixed intervals, often courtesy a Linn or other drum machine.
- Lead guitar is frequently much louder and more aggressively processed during solos than in most traditional funk, while a wah-wah effect is heavily relied upon for rhythm guitar accompaniments.
- Compositions often incorporate orchestral string arrangements, adding a symphonic pathos.
- The "bottom" of the sound is less bass-heavy than traditional funk; drums and keyboards fill more of the "bottom".

== See also ==
- Twin Cities hip-hop
- Music of Minnesota

== Sources ==
- Henderson, Alex. "The Minneapolis Sound". Allmusic. Archived from the original on November 3, 2011.
- Ohmes, Jeremy (June 4, 2009). "The Minneapolis Sound". PopMatters.
