= Brownmark =

Brown Mark
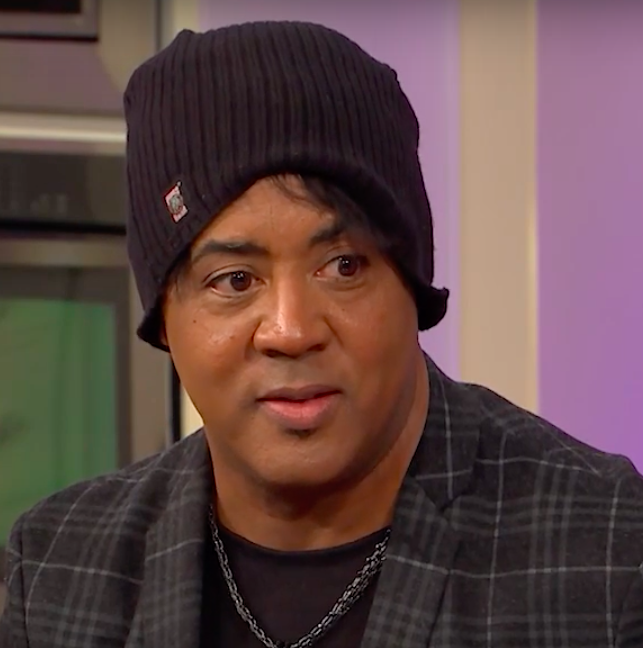
- Brown Mark in 2020

Background information
- Also known as: Brown Mark, BrownMark
- Born: Mark Brown; March 8, 1962 (age 63)
- Origin: Minneapolis, Minnesota, U.S.
- Genres: R&B, funk, rock, soul, new wave, Minneapolis sound
- Occupations: Musician, record producer
- Instruments: Bass guitar, vocals
- Years active: 1981–present
- Labels: Motown

Mark Brown (born March 8, 1962), better known by the stage name Brown Mark, also styled Brownmark and BrownMark, is an American musician, bassist and record producer.

== Life and career ==
Born in The Bronx, New York, he moved to Minneapolis, Minnesota at a young age. Brown's early fame came when he was the bass guitarist of The Revolution, Prince's original touring (and later also his recording) band. BrownMark started working for Prince in 1981, one year out of high school. Noted for his unique, funk-based style of musicianship, he became a record producer and recording artist himself after parting company with Prince in 1986.

His early influences on bass are Larry Graham, Stanley Clarke, Louis Johnson, Mark Adams from SLAVE, Jaco Pastorius, Verdine White, Nate Phillips (Dazz Band) and Bootsy Collins.

Brown joined Prince's band in 1981 for the Controversy album recordings. One of his earliest shows with Prince was opening for the Rolling Stones. He remained with Prince and was a member of The Revolution band for the Purple Rain, Around the World in a Day, and Parade albums, contributing bass and backing vocals. Additionally, Brown contributed to the music for the aborted Dream Factory album that later became a significant part of Sign o' the Times.

Brown created the funk-rock outfit Mazarati that were signed to the Paisley Park label in 1986. One infamous story was when Prince gave Brown a demo with melody and lyrics of a song that became "Kiss." Brown, along with frequent Prince collaborator David Z, worked on a version, intended for the Mazarati album. Prince liked the unique, funky rhythm and background vocals but felt he needed to keep this funky creation for himself. Removing the bass line, and adding signature guitar and falsetto vocal elements; Mazarati's background vocals were retained. The finished, minimalist song was a hard sell to Warner Bros., but Prince insisted and the song was released. Mazarati went on to release their self-titled debut album on Paisley Park, and although the album was not a major seller, it subsequently became a cult classic and has grown in reputation as a hallmark of the Minneapolis sound.

Brown achieved minor success after leaving The Revolution. BrownMark later produced musicians including Stacy Lattislaw, Chico DeBarge, and Lakeside.

After a lengthy absence from the music business, he returned with a new project entitled Cryptic. After the release of the Cryptic CD entitled It's Been Awhile the group disbanded in 2002. Brown moved on to a new project out of Tampa Florida with his newly formed group Syx Mil Breach. The CD was released late 2010 and was titled Syx mil Breach, but was immediately pulled off the market by Brown because of contract dispute with his distributors.

The Revolution was reformed in 2016 following Prince's death and went on a world healing tour to help fans mourn the loss of their mentor. BrownMark along with Wendy & Lisa and Stokley Williams from the group Mint Condition share in the singing. These days, BrownMark is making music in his own studio; jamming, recording, and performing with inspiring musicians; and encouraging younger artists who have been influenced by his career. BrownMark's memoir was due from University of Minnesota Press in late 2020.

== Discography ==
=== Albums ===
- Mazarati (1986), Paisley Park
- Kiss Serious Chico DeBarge (1987), Motown
- Personal Attention Stacy Lattisaw (1988), Motown
- Just Like That (1988), Motown
- Good Feeling (1989), Motown
- It's Been A While Cryptic Album (2002)
- Syx Mil Breach (2010)

=== Singles ===
- "Players Ball" Mazarati Paisley Park
- "Toy" Teen Dream (1987), Motown
- "Puppy Love" Teen Dream, Motown
- "Happy Relationship" Troop (1987), Atlantic
- "Watching You" Chico DeBarge (1987), Motown
- "Relationship" LakeSide (1987), Solar
- "Personal Attention" Stacy Lattisaw (1988), Motown
- "Next Time" (1988)
- "Bang Bang" (1989), Motown
- "Loverboy" Sheila E. Sex Cymbal Album
- "It's Been A While" Cryptic Album (2002)
- "Truth Not Lies" (2010) Syx Mill Breach Album
- "So Happy Together" Golden Gram Cereal commercial (General Mills)
- "Big On Taste" Pepsi Cola commercial
- "Skeletons In My Closet" (2019)
