= Purple Rain Tour =

1984–85 concert tour by Prince and the Revolution

- Continental tour by Prince and the Revolution
- Poster to the concerts in Cincinnati
- Location: North America
- Associated album: Purple Rain
- Start date: November 4, 1984
- End date: April 7, 1985
- Legs: 2
- No. of shows: 98 (99 scheduled)

Prince and the Revolution concert chronology
- 1999 Tour (1982–83); Purple Rain Tour (1984–85); Parade Tour (1986)

The Purple Rain Tour was a concert tour by American recording artist Prince and the Revolution following up on the success of his sixth studio album Purple Rain and his 1984 film Purple Rain. According to Spin, the tour sold over 1.7 million tickets.

== History ==
The tour marked the live debut of the band now named the Revolution as Wendy Melvoin made her appearance as the new guitarist in Prince's band, taking over for the departed Dez Dickerson, completing the iconic line-up of the band.

In addition to Prince and the Revolution, they were joined on tour by Apollonia 6, and Sheila E. and her band. Despite gaining fame from their appearance in the film and releasing a third album, The Time were not invited to tour, as by 1985 the group had been depleted, with many of its remaining key members quitting to embark on personal careers.

== Opening acts ==
- Sheila E.

== Set list ==
The Purple Rain Tour was the first Prince tour to open with brand new material. In this case, it was with the album opener, "Let's Go Crazy". A triple dose from the 1999 album followed: "Delirious", "1999" and "Little Red Corvette". An instrumental interlude of "Yankee Doodle" usually introduced another 1999 song, "Free". The B-side "God" was often played, followed by a usual sequence of "Computer Blue", "Darling Nikki", "The Beautiful Ones" and "When Doves Cry" (featuring a mirror setup onstage to mimic the video of the song). As encores, the remaining Purple Rain songs closed the concert, "I Would Die 4 U", "Baby I'm a Star" and "Purple Rain". The three songs were extended, often taking 30 minutes to perform. "Take Me with U" was often worked in, completing all the album tracks. Other songs sometimes included were "Father's Song", "How Come U Don't Call Me Anymore?", the new "Temptation", "Let's Pretend We're Married", "Irresistible Bitch" and "Do Me, Baby". On rare occasions, "International Lover", and some tracks from Dirty Mind (1980) and Prince (1979) would pop up. Later in the tour, an instrumental of "Under the Cherry Moon" was sometimes played. The B-side "Irresistible Bitch" was segued into the unreleased "Possessed" at the show in Syracuse.

Setlist of November 11, 1984, at the Joe Louis Arena, Detroit, Michigan, United States

1. "Let's Go Crazy"
2. "Delirious"
3. "1999" (includes Reveille interpolation)
4. "Little Red Corvette"
- Yankee Doodle (Instrumental Interlude)
5. "Free"
6. "Father's Song"
7. "God"
8. "Computer Blue"
9. "Darling Nikki"
10. "The Beautiful Ones" (includes 'backwards' "The Dance Electric"/wind chime intro)
11. "When Doves Cry"

Encore 1

12. "I Would Die 4 U"
13. "Baby I'm a Star"

Encore 2

14. "Purple Rain"

Setlist of November 22, 1984, at The Spectrum, Philadelphia, Pennsylvania, United States

1. "Let's Go Crazy"
2. "Delirious"
3. "1999" (includes Reveille interpolation)
4. "Little Red Corvette"
- Yankee Doodle (Instrumental Interlude)
5. "Free"
6. "Take Me with U"
7. "How Come U Don't Call Me Anymore?"
8. "Temptation"
9. "Let's Pretend We're Married"/"International Lover"
10. "God"
11. "Computer Blue"
12. "Darling Nikki"
13. "The Beautiful Ones" (includes 'backwards' "The Dance Electric"/wind chime intro)
14. "When Doves Cry"

Encore 1

15. "I Would Die 4 U"
16. "Baby I'm a Star"

Encore 2

17. "Purple Rain"

Setlist of December 2, 1984, at the Maple Leaf Gardens, Toronto, Ontario, Canada

1. "Let's Go Crazy"
2. "Delirious"
3. "1999" (includes Reveille interpolation)
4. "Little Red Corvette"
- Yankee Doodle (Instrumental Interlude)
5. "Under the Cherry Moon" (Instrumental)
6. "Free"
7. "Take Me with U"
8. "Dirty Mind"
9. "Do Me, Baby"
10. "I Wanna Be Your Lover"
11. "How Come U Don't Call Me Anymore?"
12. "Temptation"
13. "Let's Pretend We're Married"/"International Lover"
14. "Father's Song"
15. "God"
16. "Computer Blue"
17. "Darling Nikki"
18. "The Beautiful Ones" (includes 'backwards' "The Dance Electric"/wind chime intro)
19. "When Doves Cry"

Encore 1

20. "I Would Die 4 U"
21. "Baby I'm a Star"

Encore 2

22. "Purple Rain"

Setlist of February 23, 1985, at The Forum, Inglewood, California, United States

1. "Controversy"
2. "Let's Go Crazy"
3. "Delirious"
4. "1999" (Includes Reveille interpolation)
5. "Little Red Corvette"
6. "Take Me with U" (Includes "Controversy" and "In a Spanish Villa (Instrumental)" interpolations)
7. "When You Were Mine"
8. "4 the Tears in Your Eyes"
- Yankee Doodle (Instrumental Interlude)
9. "A Case of You"
10. "Free"
11. "Raspberry Beret"
12. "Do Me, Baby" (Includes 'purple house' spoken intro)
13. "Irresistible Bitch"
14. "Temptation"
15. "Let's Pretend We're Married" / "International Lover"
16. "God"
17. "Computer Blue"
18. "Darling Nikki"
19. "The Beautiful Ones" (Includes 'backwards' "The Dance Electric" / wind chime intro)
20. "When Doves Cry"

Encore 1

21. "I Would Die 4 U"
22. "Baby I'm a Star" (Includes "We are Young" chant & "Bodyheat" and "Partyup" interpolations)
23. "America"

Encore 2

24. "Purple Rain"

Notes

- During performances of "I Would Die 4 U"/"Baby I'm a Star", Prince would often invite Apollonia 6 and Sheila E. to jam with him for a 20-to-30-minute rendition of the songs.
- At the Landover, Maryland concert, the performance of "I Would Die 4 U"/"Baby I'm a Star" were recorded and used as a promo video for the song played on MTV.
- The Syracuse, New York concert on March 30, 1985 was recorded and released on VHS later in 1985, later receiving a remastered audio and video release in 2022.
- Singers Bruce Springsteen and Madonna joined Prince on stage during "Baby I'm a Star" at the February 23, 1985 concert at The Forum in Inglewood, California.
- A little-known fact is that Prince performed his Purple Rain Concert a month before its first scheduled date in Detroit in a concert hall called "Bogarts" on Sept. 23, 1984 in Cincinnati, Ohio. It was hinted on the local Urban Contemporary station, WBLZ, but only a few individuals knew that he would actually show up. He played a full set for a crowd of 2,500 as a trial run, and even Morris Day and Sheila E. were present.

== Tour dates ==
List of 1984 concerts, showing date, city, country, attendance, and gross revenue
Date	City	Country	Venue	Attendance	Revenue
November 4, 1984	Detroit	United States	Joe Louis Arena	129,730 / 129,730	$1,967,572
November 5, 1984	Detroit	United States	Joe Louis Arena	129,730 / 129,730	$1,967,572
November 7, 1984	Detroit	United States	Joe Louis Arena	129,730 / 129,730	$1,967,572
November 8, 1984	Detroit	United States	Joe Louis Arena	129,730 / 129,730	$1,967,572
November 9, 1984	Detroit	United States	Joe Louis Arena	129,730 / 129,730	$1,967,572
November 11, 1984	Detroit	United States	Joe Louis Arena	129,730 / 129,730	$1,967,572
November 12, 1984	Detroit	United States	Joe Louis Arena	129,730 / 129,730	$1,967,572
November 14, 1984	Greensboro	United States	Greensboro Coliseum	44,029 / 52,629	$667,773
November 15, 1984	Greensboro	United States	Greensboro Coliseum	44,029 / 52,629	$667,773
November 16, 1984	Greensboro	United States	Greensboro Coliseum	44,029 / 52,629	$667,773
November 18, 1984	Landover	United States	Capital Centre	133,182 / 133,182 (Note: This box office score data is representative of all 7 shows at the Capital Centre on November 18, 19 & 20 and 26, 28, 29 & 30 respectively.)	$2,019,927
November 19, 1984	Landover	United States	Capital Centre	133,182 / 133,182	$2,019,927
November 20, 1984	Landover	United States	Capital Centre	133,182 / 133,182	$2,019,927
November 22, 1984	Philadelphia	United States	The Spectrum	55,917 / 55,917	$848,075
November 23, 1984	Philadelphia	United States	The Spectrum	55,917 / 55,917	$848,075
November 24, 1984	Philadelphia	United States	The Spectrum	55,917 / 55,917	$848,075
November 26, 1984	Landover	United States	Capital Centre		
November 28, 1984	Landover	United States	Capital Centre		
November 29, 1984	Landover	United States	Capital Centre		
November 30, 1984	Landover	United States	Capital Centre		
December 2, 1984	Toronto	Canada	Maple Leaf Gardens	35,000 / 35,000	$628,950
December 3, 1984	Toronto	Canada	Maple Leaf Gardens	35,000 / 35,000	$628,950
December 5, 1984	Richfield	United States	Richfield Coliseum	36,400 / 36,400	$546,000
December 6, 1984	Richfield	United States	Richfield Coliseum	36,400 / 36,400	$546,000
December 9, 1984	Rosemont	United States	Rosemont Horizon	90,687 / 90,687	$1,375,419
December 10, 1984	Rosemont	United States	Rosemont Horizon	90,687 / 90,687	$1,375,419
December 11, 1984	Rosemont	United States	Rosemont Horizon	90,687 / 90,687	$1,375,419
December 13, 1984	Rosemont	United States	Rosemont Horizon	90,687 / 90,687	$1,375,419
December 14, 1984	Rosemont	United States	Rosemont Horizon	90,687 / 90,687	$1,375,419
December 15, 1984	Lexington	United States	Rupp Arena	22,347 / 22,347	$368,725
December 17, 1984	Buffalo	United States	Buffalo Memorial Auditorium	30,021 / 32,328	$525,368
December 18, 1984	Buffalo	United States	Buffalo Memorial Auditorium	30,021 / 32,328	$525,368
December 20, 1984	St. Louis	United States	St. Louis Arena	40,000 / 40,000	$700,000
December 21, 1984	St. Louis	United States	St. Louis Arena	40,000 / 40,000	$700,000
December 23, 1984	Saint Paul	United States	St. Paul Civic Center	87,580 / 87,580	$1,532,650
December 24, 1984	Saint Paul	United States	St. Paul Civic Center	87,580 / 87,580	$1,532,650
December 26, 1984	Saint Paul	United States	St. Paul Civic Center	87,580 / 87,580	$1,532,650
December 27, 1984	Saint Paul	United States	St. Paul Civic Center	87,580 / 87,580	$1,532,650
December 28, 1984	Saint Paul	United States	St. Paul Civic Center	87,580 / 87,580	$1,532,650
December 30, 1984	Dallas	United States	Reunion Arena	53,274 / 54,828 (Note: This box office score data is representative of all three shows at the Reunion Arena on December 30, 31, 1984 and January 1, 1985 respectively.)	$879,021
December 31, 1984	Dallas	United States	Reunion Arena	53,274 / 54,828	$879,021

List of 1985 concerts, showing date, city, country, attendance, and gross revenue
Date	City	Country	Venue	Attendance	Revenue
January 1, 1985	Dallas	United States	Reunion Arena		
January 3, 1985	Atlanta	United States	The Omni	87,500 / 90,000	$1,531,250
January 4, 1985	Atlanta	United States	The Omni	87,500 / 90,000	$1,531,250
January 6, 1985	Atlanta	United States	The Omni	87,500 / 90,000	$1,531,250
January 7, 1985	Atlanta	United States	The Omni	87,500 / 90,000	$1,531,250
January 8, 1985	Atlanta	United States	The Omni	87,500 / 90,000	$1,531,250
January 11, 1985	Houston	United States	The Summit	102,564 / 102,564	$1,708,690
January 12, 1985	Houston	United States	The Summit	102,564 / 102,564	$1,708,690
January 13, 1985	Houston	United States	The Summit	102,564 / 102,564	$1,708,690
January 14, 1985	Houston	United States	The Summit	102,564 / 102,564	$1,708,690
January 16, 1985	Houston	United States	The Summit	102,564 / 102,564	$1,708,690
January 17, 1985	Houston	United States	The Summit	102,564 / 102,564	$1,708,690
January 19, 1985	Birmingham	United States	BJCC Coliseum	35,400 / 35,400 (Note: This box office score data is representative of both shows at the Birmingham-Jefferson Civic Center on January 19 and February 3 respectively.)	$619,500
January 21, 1985	Cincinnati	United States	Riverfront Coliseum	44,100 / 44,100	$771,750
January 22, 1985	Cincinnati	United States	Riverfront Coliseum	44,100 / 44,100	$771,750
January 23, 1985	Cincinnati	United States	Riverfront Coliseum	44,100 / 44,100	$771,750
January 25, 1985	Memphis	United States	Mid-South Coliseum	33,600 / 33,600 (Note: This box office score data is representative of both shows at the Mid-South Coliseum on January 25 and February 4 respectively.)	$588,000
January 26, 1985	Memphis	United States	Mid-South Coliseum	33,600 / 33,600	$588,000
January 29, 1985	Austin	United States	Frank Erwin Center	32,224 / 32,224	$531,696
January 30, 1985	Austin	United States	Frank Erwin Center	32,224 / 32,224	$531,696
February 1, 1985	New Orleans	United States	Louisiana Superdome	60,000 / 60,000	$1,050,000
February 3, 1985	Birmingham	United States	BJCC Coliseum		
February 4, 1985	Memphis	United States	Mid-South Coliseum		
February 14, 1985	Tacoma	United States	Tacoma Dome	48,900 / 48,900	$806,850
February 15, 1985	Tacoma	United States	Tacoma Dome	48,900 / 48,900	$806,850
February 18, 1985	Inglewood	United States	The Forum	96,000 / 96,000	$1,680,000
February 19, 1985	Inglewood	United States	The Forum	96,000 / 96,000	$1,680,000
February 20, 1985	Inglewood	United States	The Forum	96,000 / 96,000	$1,680,000
February 22, 1985	Inglewood	United States	The Forum	96,000 / 96,000	$1,680,000
February 23, 1985	Inglewood	United States	The Forum	96,000 / 96,000	$1,680,000
February 24, 1985	Inglewood	United States	The Forum	96,000 / 96,000	$1,680,000
February 27, 1985	Daly City	United States	Cow Palace	78,498 / 78,498	$1,373,715
February 28, 1985	Daly City	United States	Cow Palace	78,498 / 78,498	$1,373,715
March 1, 1985	Daly City	United States	Cow Palace	78,498 / 78,498	$1,373,715
March 3, 1985	Daly City	United States	Cow Palace	78,498 / 78,498	$1,373,715
March 4, 1985	Daly City	United States	Cow Palace	78,498 / 78,498	$1,373,715
March 5, 1985	Daly City	United States	Cow Palace	78,498 / 78,498	$1,373,715
March 7, 1985	Las Cruces	United States	Pan American Center	26,100 / 26,100	$456,750
March 8, 1985	Las Cruces	United States	Pan American Center	26,100 / 26,100	$456,750
March 10, 1985	Long Beach	United States	Long Beach Arena	40,722 / 40,722	$712,635
March 11, 1985	Long Beach	United States	Long Beach Arena	40,722 / 40,722	$712,635
March 12, 1985	Long Beach	United States	Long Beach Arena	40,722 / 40,722	$712,635
March 17, 1985	Uniondale	United States	Nassau Coliseum	100,200 / 100,200	$1,753,500
March 18, 1985	Uniondale	United States	Nassau Coliseum	100,200 / 100,200	$1,753,500
March 20, 1985	Uniondale	United States	Nassau Coliseum	100,200 / 100,200	$1,753,500
March 22, 1985	Uniondale	United States	Nassau Coliseum	100,200 / 100,200	$1,753,500
March 23, 1985	Uniondale	United States	Nassau Coliseum	100,200 / 100,200	$1,753,500
March 24, 1985	Uniondale	United States	Nassau Coliseum	100,200 / 100,200	$1,753,500
March 26, 1985	Hartford	United States	Hartford Civic Center	—	—
March 27, 1985	Worcester	United States	Worcester Centrum	24,146 / 24,146	$422,555
March 28, 1985	Worcester	United States	Worcester Centrum	24,146 / 24,146	$422,555
March 30, 1985	Syracuse	United States	Carrier Dome	39,875 / 39,875	$697,812
April 1, 1985	Indianapolis	United States	Market Square Arena	16,089 / 16,089	$281,558
April 3, 1985	Tallahassee	United States	Tallahassee–Leon County Civic Center	12,541 / 12,541	$232,009
April 4, 1985	Lakeland	United States	Lakeland Civic Center	18,752 / 18,752	$356,288
April 5, 1985	Lakeland	United States	Lakeland Civic Center	18,752 / 18,752	$356,288
April 7, 1985	Miami	United States	Purple Bowl Stadium	53,085 / 61,500	$982,073

== Personnel ==
- Prince: Lead vocals, guitar, tambourine, and keyboards
- Wendy Melvoin: Guitar
- Brown Mark: Bass
- Matt Fink: Keyboards
- Lisa Coleman: Keyboards
- Bobby Z.: Drums

During this tour, Prince added saxophonists Eric Leeds and Eddie Minnifield to certain parts of the show and often they would join the Revolution on stage for the extended jams of "I Would Die 4 U" and "Baby I'm a Star". A minor conflict arose within the band, as Prince began giving Leeds lengthy solos during other songs, in particular Wendy was upset that her opening guitar solo on the show closing "Purple Rain" was given to Leeds.

Tour photographer was Nancy Bundt.
