= Prince and the Revolution: Live =

Video by Prince and The Revolution
- Released: July 29, 1985
- Recorded: March 30, 1985
- Venues: Carrier Dome; Syracuse, New York, United States
- Genres: R&B, pop, rock, New wave
- Length: 116:00
- Labels: Warner Music Video, Paisley Park
- Director: Paul Becher

Prince chronology
| Prince and the Revolution: Live (1985) | Lovesexy Live 1 (1989) |

Professional ratings
Review scores
| Source | Rating |
|---|---|
| Pitchfork | 8.7/10 |

Prince and the Revolution: Live is a live concert video by Prince and the Revolution. Released after the Purple Rain Tour was complete, the video is a recording of the March 30, 1985 concert at the Carrier Dome in Syracuse, New York. The concert was also broadcast live throughout Europe as the final act of the 15th "Rock Night", an all-night show of four concerts staged by West German public broadcaster Westdeutscher Rundfunk as part of its Rockpalast series that was simulcast by the Eurovision network of European TV stations.

First released on VHS on July 29, 1985, a DVD version was later released with the 2017 deluxe edition of Purple Rain. An audio companion of the concert was released digitally on May 15, 2020. On June 3, 2022, Legacy Recordings, in association with NPG Records, reissued the project for the first time in physical audio format (CD and vinyl) and Blu-ray video with remastered video and the audio being remixed by Chris James for both 5.1 surround sound and Dolby Atmos (with the Atmos mix also being issued digitally through select streaming platforms on the same day).

== Background ==
In 1984–85, to capitalise on his growing success with the Purple Rain album, Prince toured the United States extensively to promote the album and sales increased accordingly. Though not on the video, the tour was opened by Sheila E.

== Music ==
Unlike Prince's past tours, which usually opened with older material, Prince now had some #1 hits and chose to open the tour with Purple Rain album opener, "Let's Go Crazy". This segued into a triple-dose from the 1999 album. "Delirious" contained a bit of the extended version of "Let's Go Crazy". "1999" followed. Next came "Little Red Corvette" and audience participation with "Take Me with U".

The pace was slowed down with "Do Me, Baby", introduced by a bit of "Purple House", Prince's take on Jimi Hendrix's "Red House". The ballad was jolted into the funk of B-side, "Irresistible Bitch". The shortened version segued into "Possessed" (which was dedicated to James Brown in the credits). Another audience tease came with "How Come U Don't Call Me Anymore?" before a mostly-spoken "Let's Pretend We're Married". A brief "International Lover" was followed by the lengthy ode to the Divine, "God".

The remainder of the concert was dedicated to Purple Rain material. "Computer Blue" (which was heavily based on the original uncut version found on the special deluxe edition of Purple Rain) was followed by "Darling Nikki." On the album, "Darling Nikki" is suffixed by a backward message over rain and storm sounds effects. In the concert, the backward message is played forward. In a twist, a bit of backwards "The Dance Electric" (a Prince-written song for former bandmate André Cymone) introduced "The Beautiful Ones". The song flowed immediately to "When Doves Cry". In post-production, a mirrored camera effect was added to the song to mimic the mirroring in the video for the song. The last three songs followed the album's track listing for side two. Serving as the first of two encores, "I Would Die 4 U" and "Baby I'm a Star" were drawn out into an extended jam session. Sheila E. and her band, Apollonia 6 and Eric Leeds) were also in this section of the show. The last encore was "Purple Rain." Prince played this over 18 minutes which included a longer intro, Wendy encouraging the audience to sing the song's post-chorus "ohh ohh" vocals, and lengthy guitar solos on two of Prince's guitars (both seen in the movie and in videos), including the white Cloud guitar.

== Track listing ==
VHS/DVD/Blu-ray
| No. | Title | Album release(s) | Length |
|---|---|---|---|
| 1. | "Let's Go Crazy" | Purple Rain | 5:30 |
| 2. | "Delirious" | 1999 | 2:46 |
| 3. | "1999" | 1999 | 4:15 |
| 4. | "Little Red Corvette" | 1999 | 5:10 |
| 5. | "Take Me with U" | Purple Rain | 4:15 |
| 6. | "Yankee Doodle" (Interlude) | N/A | 6:10 |
| 7. | "Do Me, Baby" (includes "Purple House" spoken intro) | Controversy | 4:40 |
| 8. | "Irresistible Bitch" | B-side of "Let's Pretend We're Married"; The Hits/The B-Sides | 2:00 |
| 9. | "Possessed" | 1999 Deluxe Edition (1982 version); Purple Rain Deluxe Edition (1984 version) | 4:24 |
| 10. | "How Come U Don't Call Me Anymore?" | B-side of "1999"; The Hits/The B-Sides | 5:05 |
| 11. | "Let's Pretend We're Married" | 1999 | 4:15 |
| 12. | "International Lover" | 1999 | 1:00 |
| 13. | "God" | B-side of "Purple Rain"; The Hits/The B-Sides | 8:30 |
| 14. | "Computer Blue" | Purple Rain | 4:30 |
| 15. | "Darling Nikki" | Purple Rain | 4:00 |
| 16. | "The Beautiful Ones" (includes backwards "The Dance Electric" and wind chime intro) | Purple Rain | 7:30 |
| 17. | "When Doves Cry" | Purple Rain | 8:15 |
| 18. | "I Would Die 4 U" | Purple Rain | 3:50 |
| 19. | "Baby I'm a Star" | Purple Rain | 10:00 |
| 20. | "Purple Rain" | Purple Rain | 18:24 |

CD Disc 1
| No. | Title | Album release(s) | Length |
|---|---|---|---|
| 1. | "Let's Go Crazy" | Purple Rain | 5:30 |
| 2. | "Delirious" | 1999 | 2:46 |
| 3. | "1999" | 1999 | 4:15 |
| 4. | "Little Red Corvette" | 1999 | 5:10 |
| 5. | "Take Me with U" | Purple Rain | 4:15 |
| 6. | "Yankee Doodle" (Interlude) | N/A | 6:10 |
| 7. | "Do Me, Baby" (includes "Purple House" spoken intro) | Controversy | 4:40 |
| 8. | "Irresistible Bitch" | B-side of "Let's Pretend We're Married"; The Hits/The B-Sides | 2:00 |
| 9. | "Possessed" | 1999 Deluxe Edition (1982 version); Purple Rain Deluxe Edition (1984 version) | 4:24 |
| 10. | "How Come U Don't Call Me Anymore?" | B-side of "1999"; The Hits/The B-Sides | 5:05 |
| 11. | "Let's Pretend We're Married" | 1999 | 4:15 |
| 12. | "International Lover" | 1999 | 1:00 |
| 13. | "God" | B-side of "Purple Rain"; The Hits/The B-Sides | 8:30 |
| 14. | "Computer Blue" | Purple Rain | 4:30 |

CD Disc 2
| No. | Title | Album release(s) | Length |
|---|---|---|---|
| 1. | "Darling Nikki" | Purple Rain | 4:00 |
| 2. | "The Beautiful Ones" (includes backwards "The Dance Electric" and wind chime intro) | Purple Rain | 7:30 |
| 3. | "When Doves Cry" | Purple Rain | 8:15 |
| 4. | "I Would Die 4 U" | Purple Rain | 3:50 |
| 5. | "Baby I'm a Star" | Purple Rain | 10:00 |
| 6. | "Purple Rain" | Purple Rain | 18:24 |

== Personnel ==
Prince and the Revolution

- Prince – lead vocals, guitar, tambourine and keyboards
- Bobby Z. – drums
- Brown Mark – bass guitar
- Wendy Melvoin – guitar
- Lisa Coleman – keyboards
- Dr. Fink – keyboards
- Eric Leeds – saxophone

Guests

- Jerome Benton – dancer
- Greg Brooks – dancer
- Wally Safford – dancer
- Sheila E. – percussion
- Miko Weaver – guitar
- Eddie M. – saxophone
- Juan Escovedo – percussion
- Susie Davis – tambourine
- Apollonia Kotero – vocals, dancer and tambourine
- Susan Moonsie – vocals, dancer and tambourine
- Brenda Bennett – vocals, dancer and tambourine

== Charts ==
Chart performance for Prince and the Revolution: Live
| Chart (2022) | Peak position |
|---|---|
| Australian Albums (ARIA) | 96 |
| Austrian Albums (Ö3 Austria) | 15 |
| Belgian Albums (Ultratop Flanders) | 5 |
| Belgian Albums (Ultratop Wallonia) | 4 |
| Dutch Albums (Album Top 100) | 4 |
| German Albums (Offizielle Top 100) | 8 |
| Japanese Albums (Oricon) | 20 |
| Japanese Hot Albums (Billboard Japan) | 26 |
| Portuguese Albums (AFP) | 16 |
| Scottish Albums (Official Charts) | 6 |
| Spanish Albums (Promusicae) | 27 |
| Swiss Albums (Schweizer Hitparade) | 7 |
| UK Albums (Official Charts) | 21 |
| UK R&B Albums (Official Charts) | 1 |
| US Billboard 200 | 22 |
| US Top R&B/Hip-Hop Albums (Billboard) | 11 |
