= Welcome 2 =

2010–12 concert tour by Prince

- Tour by Prince
- Banner advertisement for the North American leg of the tour
- Location: North America; Europe; Oceania
- Associated album: 20Ten
- Start date: December 15, 2010
- End date: September 26, 2012
- Legs: 7
- No. of shows: 83

Prince concert chronology
- Prince 20Ten (2010); Welcome 2 (2010–12); Live Out Loud Tour (2013)

Welcome 2 was a concert tour by American musician Prince. Playing over 80 shows, the tour reached North America, Europe, and Australia. Each leg of the tour was branded with the "Welcome 2" title followed by the continent in which the leg was located. The tour marked the singer's first performances in North America in over six years. The show was composed of the singer performing his hits with his band The New Power Generation. Alongside Prince, various musicians performed including Janelle Monáe, Esperanza Spalding, and Cassandra Wilson. The tour placed 39th on Pollstar's "Top 50 Worldwide Tour", earning nearly $20 million.^{1}

== Background ==
Prince announced the tour on October 14, 2010 at the famed Apollo Theater in New York City. He stated the tour would begin in Greater New York. He further explained to the audience each show would be different. "Come early, come often. I have a lot of hits... no two shows will be the same". For the tour, Prince played a custom gold Fender Stratocaster (made by the Fender Custom Shop), which was auctioned off at the end of the tour. The proceed benefited the Harlem Children's Zone.

The concerts were staged in the round, with the stage shaped like the singer's iconic love symbol. During shows, Prince invited several celebrities to come onstage and "jam out" with him, including Naomi Campbell, Whoopi Goldberg, Jamie Foxx, Alicia Keys, Leighton Meester, Questlove, Sherri Shepherd, Whitney Houston, and Cornel West. He also performed duets with specials guests throughout the shows in North America. For "The Beautiful Ones", Prince was joined onstage by ballet dancer Misty Copeland. During the concert at Madison Square Garden on December 29, 2010, Janelle Monáe performed "If I Was Your Girlfriend" with the singer. During the same show, Cyndi Lauper and Egypt Sherrod performed "Jungle Love".

Following his shows in Greater New York, Prince expanded the tour to include the San Francisco Bay Area and The Carolinas. In April, he announced he would perform a twenty-one night residency show at The Forum in Inglewood, California, during an appearance on Lopez Tonight. Dubbed "Welcome 2 America: 21-Night Stands", the singer performed throughout the months of April and May, including stops in Fresno, San Jose, and Sacramento. As the tour continued, Prince performed at several music festivals in Europe. In the fall of 2011, he announced he would bring his tour to Canada, his first performances in the territory in nearly ten years. In 2012, a tour of Australia received a warm response from spectators.

== Opening acts ==
- Lalah Hathaway (East Rutherford—December 15, Greenville, North Charleston)
- Esperanza Spalding (East Rutherford—December 15)
- Maceo Parker (East Rutherford—December 17)
- Cassandra Wilson (East Rutherford—December 17)
- Graham Central Station (New York City—December 18, Oakland, Fresno, San Jose, Sacramento)
- Sinbad (New York City—December 18)
- Janelle Monáe (New York City—December 29)
- Mint Condition (New York City—December 29, Columbia)
- Sharon Jones & The Dap-Kings (New York City—January 18)
- Cee Lo Green (New York City—February 7)
- Sheila E. (Oakland, Fresno, San Jose, Sacramento)
- Anthony Hamilton (Charlotte)
- Chaka Khan (Raleigh, Greensboro)

== Setlist ==
Greater New York

December 15, 2010

1. "Laydown"
2. "Black Muse"
3. "The Beautiful Ones"
4. Medley: "Uptown" / "Raspberry Beret" / "Cream"
5. "Cool" (contains excerpts from "Let's Work")
6. "U Got the Look"
7. "Shhh"
8. "Angel" (performed by Shelby J.)
9. "Nothing Compares 2 U" (performed with Shelby J.)
10. "She's Always in My Hair"
11. "If I Was Your Girlfriend" (performed with Esperanza Spalding)
12. "Insatiable"
13. "Scandalous!"
14. "Adore"
15. "Purple Rain"

Encore

16. "Kiss"
17. "Sometimes It Snows in April" (performed with Lalah Hathaway)
18. "Diamonds and Pearls" (performed with Lalah Hathaway)
19. Medley: "All the Critics Love U in New York" / "Controversy" (contains excerpts from "Housequake") / "Sexy Dancer" / "Le Freak"

December 18, 2010

1. "Welcome 2 America"
2. "Dance (Disco Heat)"
3. "Baby I'm a Star"
4. "The Beautiful Ones"
5. "Let's Go Crazy"
6. "Delirious"
7. "1999"
8. "Shhh"
9. Medley: "Uptown" / "Raspberry Beret" / "Cream"
10. "Cool" (contains excerpts from "Let's Work")
11. "U Got the Look" (performed with Sheila E.)
12. "The Glamorous Life" (contains elements of "Soul Sacrifice") (performed with Sheila E.)
13. "Nothing Compares 2 U" (performed with Shelby J.)
14. "Purple Rain"

Encore

15. "Kiss" (performed with ?uestlove)
16. "A Love Bizarre"

December 29, 2010

1. "The Beautiful Ones"
2. "Let's Go Crazy"
3. "Delirious"
4. "1999"
5. "Little Red Corvette"
6. Medley: "Uptown" / "Raspberry Beret" / "Cream"
7. "Cool" (contains excerpts from "Let's Work")
8. "U Got the Look" (performed with Sheila E.)
9. "The Question of U"
10. "Purple Rain"

Encore

11. Medley: "Kiss" / "She's Always in My Hair" / "If I Was Your Girlfriend" (performed with Janelle Monáe)
12. Medley: "Condition of the Heart" / "Do Me, Baby" / "I Wanna Be Your Lover" / "How Come U Don't Call Me Anymore?" / "Sometimes It Snows in April"
13. "Controversy" (contains excerpts from "Housequake")
14. "Jungle Love" (performed with Cyndi Lauper and Egypt Sherrod)
California

February 23, 2011

1. "Let's Go Crazy"
2. "Delirious"
3. "1999"
4. "Little Red Corvette"
5. "The Glamorous Life" (contains elements of "Soul Sacrifice") (performed with Sheila E.)
6. "Somewhere Here on Earth"
7. "I Love U, but I Don't Trust U Anymore"
8. "Controversy" (contains elements of "Batdance")
9. "Play That Funky Music"
10. "A Love Bizarre" (performed with Sheila E.)
11. Medley: "Sexy Dancer" / "Le Freak" / "Love Rollercoaster"
12. "Controversy" (Reprise) (contains excerpts from "Housequake")
13. "If I Was Your Girlfriend"
14. "Kiss"
15. "Purple Rain"

Encore

16. "Dance (Disco Heat)" (Instrumental Interlude)
17. "Baby I'm a Star"
18. Medley: "When Doves Cry" / "Nasty Girl" / "Sign '☮' the Times" / "Alphabet St."
19. "My Love Is Forever"
20. "Darling Nikki" (Instrumental Interlude)
21. "Pop Life" (contains excerpts from "Single Ladies (Put a Ring on It)")
22. "Black Sweat"
23. "Jungle Love"

April 14, 2011

1. "D.M.S.R."
2. "Pop Life"
3. "Extraordinary"
4. Medley: "Uptown" / "Raspberry Beret" / "Cream"
5. "Cool" (contains elements of "Don't Stop 'Til You Get Enough")
6. "Let's Work"
7. "U Got the Look"
8. "Purple Rain"
9. "Let's Go Crazy"
10. "Delirious"
11. "1999"
12. "The Beautiful Ones"
13. "Little Red Corvette"
14. "Kiss"
15. Medley: "When Doves Cry" / "Nasty Girl" / "Sign '☮' the Times" / "Darling Nikki" (Instrumental Interlude) / "777-9311"
16. "Single Ladies (Put a Ring on It)" (Instrumental Interlude)
17. "If I Was Your Girlfriend"
18. "Insatiable"
19. "Scandalous!"
20. "Adore"
21. "A Love Bizarre" (performed with Sheila E.)

Encore

22. "Play That Funky Music"
23. "Controversy" (contains excerpts from "Housequake")
24. "The Glamorous Life" (contains elements of "Soul Sacrifice") (performed with Sheila E.)
25. "Peach" (performed with Sheila E.)
26. "Dance (Disco Heat)"
27. "Baby I'm a Star"
28. "Stratus" (Instrumental Interlude)
29. Medley: "Sometimes It Snows in April" / "Laydown" / "Endorphinmachine" / "She's Always in My Hair" / "Dreamer"
30. "Welcome 2 America"
The Carolinas

March 24, 2011

1. Medley: "When Doves Cry" / "Nasty Girl" / "Darling Nikki" (Instrumental Interlude) / "Sign '☮' the Times" / "777-9311" / "The Most Beautiful Girl in the World"
2. "Uptown"
3. "Raspberry Beret"
4. "Cream"
5. "Cool" (contains elements of "Don't Stop 'Til You Get Enough")
6. "Let's Work"
7. "U Got the Look"
8. "Nothing Compares 2 U"
9. "Take Me with U"
10. "Anotherloverholenyohead"
11. "Controversy" (contains elements of "Batdance")
12. "Play That Funky Music"
13. "Which Way Is Up?"
14. "Controversy" (Reprise) (contains excerpts from "Housequake")
15. "I Want to Be Free"
16. "Shhh"
17. "The Beautiful Ones"
18. "Diamonds and Pearls"
19. "Something in the Water (Does Not Compute)"
20. "How Come U Don't Call Me Anymore?"
21. "If I Was Your Girlfriend"
22. "Kiss"
23. "Purple Rain"

Encore

24. "Dance (Disco Heat)"
25. "Baby I'm a Star"
Australia

Sydney—May 11, 2012

1. "Gold"
2. "Jam of the Year
3. "The Song of the Heart"
4. "Let's Go Crazy"
5. "Delirious"
6. "1999"
7. "Little Red Corvette"
8. "Nothing Compares 2 U" (performed with Shelby J.)
9. "Take Me with U"
10. "Raspberry Beret"
11. "Cream"
12. "Cool" (contains elements of "Don't Stop 'Til You Get Enough")
13. "Sometimes It Snows in April"
14. "Love... Thy Will Be Done"
15. "Mountains" (contains excerpts from "The Dance Electric")
16. Medley: "When Doves Cry" / "Hot Thing" / "Sign '☮' the Times" (contains excerpts from "Jungle Love") / "The Most Beautiful Girl in the World"
17. "Forever in My Life"
18. "I Would Die 4 U
19. "Kiss"

Encore

20. "Purple Rain"
21. "Controversy"
22. "Peach"

Melbourne—May 14, 2012

1. "Gold"
2. "Jam of the Year"
3. "Let's Go Crazy"
4. "Delirious"
5. "1999"
6. "Little Red Corvette"
7. "Nothing Compares 2 U" (performed with Shelby J.)
8. "I Could Never Take the Place of Your Man"
9. "Take Me with U"
10. "Raspberry Beret"
11. "Cream"
12. "Cool" (contains elements of "Don't Stop 'Til You Get Enough")
13. "Sometimes It Snows in April"
14. "Love... Thy Will Be Done"
15. "Mountains" (contains excerpts from "The Dance Electric")
16. Medley: "When Doves Cry" / "Nasty Girl" / "Darling Nikki" / "Pop Life" / "Sign '☮' the Times" / "The Most Beautiful Girl in the World" / "Single Ladies (Put a Ring on It)"
17. "Hot Thing"
18. "I Would Die 4 U"
19. "Kiss"

Encore

20. "Purple Rain"
21. "If I Was Your Girlfriend"
22. "She's Always in My Hair"
23. "Dreamer"
24. "Peach"

== Tour dates ==
List of 2010 concerts
| Date | City | Country | Venue |
|---|---|---|---|
| December 15, 2010 | East Rutherford | United States | Izod Center |
| December 17, 2010 | East Rutherford | United States | Izod Center |
| December 18, 2010 | New York City | United States | Madison Square Garden |
| December 29, 2010 | New York City | United States | Madison Square Garden |

List of 2011 concerts
| Date | City | Country | Venue |
|---|---|---|---|
| January 18, 2011 | New York City | United States | Madison Square Garden |
| February 7, 2011 | New York City | United States | Madison Square Garden |
| February 21, 2011 | Oakland | United States | Oracle Arena |
| February 23, 2011 | Oakland | United States | Oracle Arena |
| February 24, 2011 | Oakland | United States | Oracle Arena |
| March 21, 2011 | Columbia | United States | Colonial Life Arena |
| March 23, 2011 | Raleigh | United States | RBC Center |
| March 24, 2011 | Charlotte | United States | Time Warner Cable Arena |
| March 26, 2011 | Greensboro | United States | Greensboro Coliseum |
| March 28, 2011 | Greenville | United States | BI-LO Center |
| March 30, 2011 | North Charleston | United States | North Charleston Coliseum |
| April 14, 2011^{[A]} | Inglewood | United States | The Forum |
| April 21, 2011^{[A]} | Inglewood | United States | The Forum |
| April 22, 2011^{[A]} | Inglewood | United States | The Forum |
| April 23, 2011^{[A]} | Inglewood | United States | The Forum |
| April 28, 2011^{[A]} | Inglewood | United States | The Forum |
| April 29, 2011^{[A]} | Inglewood | United States | The Forum |
| April 30, 2011^{[A]} | Inglewood | United States | The Forum |
| May 5, 2011^{[A]} | Inglewood | United States | The Forum |
| May 6, 2011^{[A]} | Inglewood | United States | The Forum |
| May 7, 2011^{[A]} | Inglewood | United States | The Forum |
| May 13, 2011^{[A]} | Inglewood | United States | The Forum |
| May 14, 2011^{[A]} | Inglewood | United States | The Forum |
| May 18, 2011 | Fresno | United States | Save Mart Center |
| May 19, 2011 | San Jose | United States | HP Pavilion |
| May 21, 2011 | San Jose | United States | HP Pavilion |
| May 22, 2011 | Sacramento | United States | Power Balance Pavilion |
| May 27, 2011^{[A]} | Inglewood | United States | The Forum |
| May 28, 2011^{[A]} | Inglewood | United States | The Forum |
| May 29, 2011^{[A]} | Inglewood | United States | The Forum |
| June 24, 2011^{[B]} | Montreal | Canada | Métropolis |
| June 25, 2011^{[B]} | Montreal | Canada | Métropolis |
| June 30, 2011 | Saint-Denis | France | Stade de France |
| July 2, 2011^{[C]} | Gdynia | Poland | Babie Doły Airfield |
| July 3, 2011^{[D]} | Beltring | England | Hop Farm Country Park |
| July 5, 2011 | Ghent | Belgium | Sint-Pietersplein |
| July 6, 2011 | Ghent | Belgium | Sint-Pietersplein |
| July 8, 2011^{[E]} | Rotterdam | Netherlands | Rotterdam Ahoy |
| July 9, 2011^{[E]} | Rotterdam | Netherlands | Rotterdam Ahoy |
| July 10, 2011^{[E]} | Rotterdam | Netherlands | Rotterdam Ahoy |
| July 13, 2011 | Esch-sur-Alzette | Luxembourg | Rockhal |
| July 15, 2011^{[F]} | Perugia | Italy | Arena Santa Giuliana |
| July 16, 2011^{[G]} | Lucca | Italy | Piazza Napoleone |
| July 21, 2011 | Helsinki | Finland | Hartwall Arena |
| July 24, 2011 | Amsterdam | Netherlands | Melkweg |
| July 25, 2011 | Amsterdam | Netherlands | Melkweg |
| July 26, 2011 | Rotterdam | Netherlands | Rotterdam Ahoy |
| July 28, 2011 | Cologne | Germany | Lanxess Arena |
| July 30, 2011 | Malahide | Ireland | Malahide Castle |
| August 2, 2011 | Oslo | Norway | Oslo Spektrum |
| August 3, 2011 | Oslo | Norway | Oslo Spektrum |
| August 6, 2011^{[H]} | Copenhagen | Denmark | 10 Øren |
| August 7, 2011^{[H]} | Copenhagen | Denmark | 10 Øren |
| August 9, 2011^{[J]} | Budapest | Hungary | Óbuda Island |
| August 12, 2011^{[K]} | Gothenburg | Sweden | Slottsskogen |
| August 17, 2011 | Zürich | Switzerland | Hallenstadion |
| November 25, 2011 | Toronto | Canada | Air Canada Centre |
| November 26, 2011 | Toronto | Canada | Air Canada Centre |
| November 30, 2011 | Halifax | Canada | Scotiabank Centre |
| December 2, 2011 | Montreal | Canada | Bell Centre |
| December 3, 2011 | Ottawa | Canada | Canadian Tire Centre |
| December 5, 2011 | London | Canada | Budweiser Gardens |
| December 8, 2011 | Winnipeg | Canada | MTS Centre |
| December 13, 2011 | Edmonton | Canada | Northlands Coliseum |
| December 14, 2011 | Calgary | Canada | Scotiabank Saddledome |
| December 16, 2011 | Vancouver | Canada | Rogers Arena |
| December 17, 2011 | Victoria | Canada | Save-On-Foods Memorial Centre |
| December 19, 2011 | Tacoma | United States | Tacoma Dome |

List of 2012 concerts
| Date | City | Country | Venue |
|---|---|---|---|
| May 11, 2012 | Sydney | Australia | Qudos Bank Arena |
| May 12, 2012 | Sydney | Australia | Qudos Bank Arena |
| May 14, 2012 | Melbourne | Australia | Rod Laver Arena |
| May 15, 2012 | Melbourne | Australia | Rod Laver Arena |
| May 18, 2012 | Brisbane | Australia | Brisbane Entertainment Centre |
| May 22, 2012 | Sydney | Australia | Qudos Bank Arena |
| May 26, 2012 | Brisbane | Australia | Brisbane Entertainment Centre |
| May 30, 2012 | Melbourne | Australia | Rod Laver Arena |
| September 24, 2012 | Chicago | United States | United Center |
| September 25, 2012 | Chicago | United States | United Center |
| September 26, 2012 | Chicago | United States | United Center |

Festivals and other miscellaneous performances

^{A} These concerts were a part of "21-Night Stands"
^{B} These concerts were a part of the "Montreal International Jazz Festival"
^{C} This concert was a part of the "Heineken Open'er Festival"
^{D} This concert was a part of the "Hop Farm Festival"
^{E} These concerts were a part of the "North Sea Jazz Festival"

^{F} This concert was a part of the "Umbria Jazz Festival"
^{G} This concert was a part of the "Lucca Summer Festival"
^{H} These concerts were a part of the "NPG Music and Arts Festival"
^{J} This concert was a part of the "Sziget Festival"
^{K} This concert was a part of the "Way Out West Festival"

Cancellations and rescheduled shows

| December 14, 2010 | East Rutherford, New Jersey | Izod Center | Cancelled |
| February 4, 2011 | Dallas | theEvent Tent Complex | Cancelled. The concert was to benefit the Goss-Michael Foundation |
| July 23, 2011 | Oslo, Norway | Oslo Spektrum | Rescheduled to August 2, 2011 due to the 2011 Norway attacks |
| July 24, 2011 | Oslo, Norway | Oslo Spektrum | Rescheduled to August 3, 2011 due to the 2011 Norway attacks |
| August 4, 2011 | Berlin, Germany | O_{2} World | Cancelled |
| December 11, 2011 | Saskatoon, Saskatchewan | SaskTel Centre | Cancelled |

=== Box office score data ===
| Venue | City | Tickets sold / available | Gross revenue |
|---|---|---|---|
| Madison Square Garden^{[A]} | New York City | 70,855 / 72,911 (97%) | $7,592,092 |
| Oracle Arena | Oakland | 42,475 / 42,475 (100%) | $4,418,308 |
| Save Mart Center | Fresno | 11,918 / 13,028 (91%) | $837,960 |
| Bell Centre | Montreal | 8,753 / 10,900 (80%) | $1,113,260 |
| John Labatt Centre | London | 8,790 / 9,053 (97%) | $958,695 |
| Halifax Metro Centre | Halifax | 10,039 / 10,039 (100%) | $1,000,320 |
| Rexall Place | Edmonton | 10,775 / 16,258 (66%) | $1,119,660 |
| Allphones Arena | Sydney | 39,827 / 44,118 (90%) | $7,182,190 |
| Rod Laver Arena | Melbourne | 42,086 / 42,900 (98%) | $7,540,270 |
| Brisbane Entertainment Centre | Boondall | 17,798 / 20,036 (84%) | $3,212,670 |
| TOTAL | | 263,316 / 281,718 (93%) | $34,975,425 |

Notes
^{A} The gross for the January 18th concert at Madison Square Garden placed second on Billboard's "Hot Tours", for the month of January 2011.

== Notes ==
1.The annual Pollstar ranking of the concert industry's top performing artists is tabulated for all worldwide shows, worked between January 1 and June 30, 2011. All ticket sales figures are calculated in U.S. dollars and are based on reported information and extensive research by Pollstar.
