= World Soundtrack Award for Major Contribution to the Art of Film Music and Sound =

Belgian music award

The award for Major Contribution to the Art of Film Music and Sound is a very special award that has been handed out only once since the Awards' 2001 debut. It is still considered an official category by the World Soundtrack Academy, so more awards could be handed out in the future. The award is to commemorate work that has helped shape current film music.

== Winners ==
- 2004 Purple Rain - To Prince & The Revolution (Prince, Wendy Melvoin, Lisa Coleman, Bobby Z., Matt Fink & Brownmark) in honor of the twentieth anniversary of their movie Purple Rain.
