= List of Billboard 200 number-one albums of 1984 =

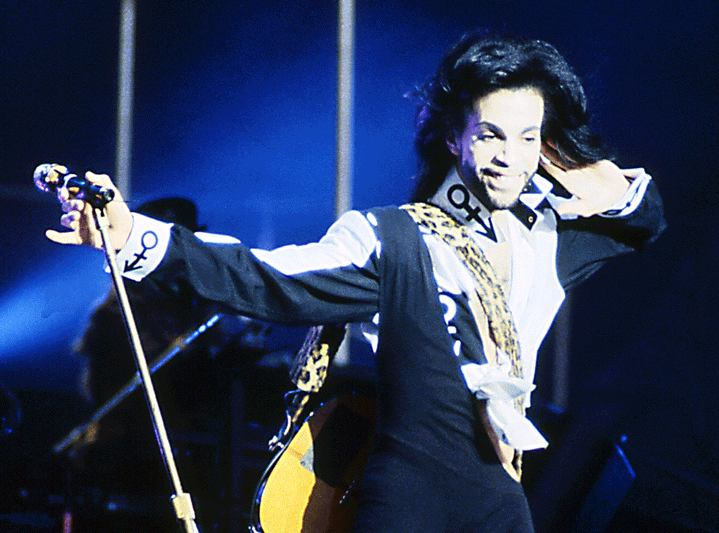
Purple Rain by Prince and The Revolution stayed twenty-two weeks at number one and sold more than nine million copies.

The Billboard 200, published in Billboard magazine, is a weekly chart that ranks the highest-selling music albums and EPs in the United States. Before Nielsen SoundScan began tracking sales in 1991, Billboard estimated sales from a representative sampling of record stores nationwide, using telephone, fax or messenger service. Data were based on rankings made by the record stores of the best-selling records, not on actual sales figures.

There were only five number-one albums in 1984, the fewest in history. Michael Jackson's Thriller, which spent twenty-two weeks in 1983 at number one, stayed an additional fifteen weeks at the top in 1984 and was the best-selling album of the year. Thriller was the only album to be the best-seller of two years (1983–1984) in the United States until 21 by Adele in 2011 and 2012. Footloose, the original soundtrack of the Paramount motion picture, Footloose, which included the two number one hits, "Footloose" by Kenny Loggins and "Let's Hear It for the Boy" by Deniece Williams, spent ten weeks at number one, sold over seven million copies and received a nomination for Best Score Soundtrack Album for a Motion Picture at the 27th Grammy Awards. Rock band Huey Lewis and the News released their third album Sports in 1983. Despite the limited expectations of their record company and the blockbuster competition from other albums like Thriller and Born in the U.S.A, Sports managed to top the chart for one week and sold six million copies, reaching the second position of the year-end chart of 1984.

In 1984, singer-songwriter Bruce Springsteen released his seventh studio album Born in the U.S.A. Springsteen ignored the musical movements of the Second British Invasion, instead he embraced the legacy of Phil Spector's and the garage bands releases with more radio-friendly arrangements, the use of synthesizers and incorporating new electronic textures while keeping the American rock & roll from the early 1960s. The album stayed four weeks at number one, yielded seven top ten singles and sold more than seven and a half million copies. Purple Rain, the soundtrack from the film of the same name, was the first Prince album to be recorded with and credited to his backing group The Revolution. The album was loaded with life, invention, pure rock & roll, with synthesizer touches that pushed heavily into psychedelic music, and have constant reminders of Sly Stone in the bass lines, which make it the most pop-oriented album Prince has ever made. The album topped the chart for the last twenty-two weeks of the year, sold more than nine million copies, won the Grammy Award for Best Score Soundtrack Album for a Motion Picture and received a nomination for Album of the Year.

== Chart history ==
Key
†	Indicates best performing album of 1984

Issue date	Album	Artist(s)	Label	Ref.
January 7	Thriller †	Michael Jackson	Epic	
January 14	Thriller †	Michael Jackson	Epic	
January 21	Thriller †	Michael Jackson	Epic	
January 28	Thriller †	Michael Jackson	Epic	
February 4	Thriller †	Michael Jackson	Epic	
February 11	Thriller †	Michael Jackson	Epic	
February 18	Thriller †	Michael Jackson	Epic	
February 25	Thriller †	Michael Jackson	Epic	
March 3	Thriller †	Michael Jackson	Epic	
March 10	Thriller †	Michael Jackson	Epic	
March 17	Thriller †	Michael Jackson	Epic	
March 24	Thriller †	Michael Jackson	Epic	
March 31	Thriller †	Michael Jackson	Epic	
April 7	Thriller †	Michael Jackson	Epic	
April 14	Thriller †	Michael Jackson	Epic	
April 21	Footloose	Soundtrack	Columbia	
April 28	Footloose	Soundtrack	Columbia	
May 5	Footloose	Soundtrack	Columbia	
May 12	Footloose	Soundtrack	Columbia	
May 19	Footloose	Soundtrack	Columbia	
May 26	Footloose	Soundtrack	Columbia	
June 2	Footloose	Soundtrack	Columbia	
June 9	Footloose	Soundtrack	Columbia	
June 16	Footloose	Soundtrack	Columbia	
June 23	Footloose	Soundtrack	Columbia	
June 30	Sports	Huey Lewis and the News	Chrysalis	
July 7	Born in the U.S.A.	Bruce Springsteen	Columbia	
July 14	Born in the U.S.A.	Bruce Springsteen	Columbia	
July 21	Born in the U.S.A.	Bruce Springsteen	Columbia	
July 28	Born in the U.S.A.	Bruce Springsteen	Columbia	
August 4	Purple Rain	Prince and the Revolution / Soundtrack	Warner Bros.	
August 11	Purple Rain	Prince and the Revolution / Soundtrack	Warner Bros.	
August 18	Purple Rain	Prince and the Revolution / Soundtrack	Warner Bros.	
August 25	Purple Rain	Prince and the Revolution / Soundtrack	Warner Bros.	
September 1	Purple Rain	Prince and the Revolution / Soundtrack	Warner Bros.	
September 8	Purple Rain	Prince and the Revolution / Soundtrack	Warner Bros.	
September 15	Purple Rain	Prince and the Revolution / Soundtrack	Warner Bros.	
September 22	Purple Rain	Prince and the Revolution / Soundtrack	Warner Bros.	
September 29	Purple Rain	Prince and the Revolution / Soundtrack	Warner Bros.	
October 6	Purple Rain	Prince and the Revolution / Soundtrack	Warner Bros.	
October 13	Purple Rain	Prince and the Revolution / Soundtrack	Warner Bros.	
October 20	Purple Rain	Prince and the Revolution / Soundtrack	Warner Bros.	
October 27	Purple Rain	Prince and the Revolution / Soundtrack	Warner Bros.	
November 3	Purple Rain	Prince and the Revolution / Soundtrack	Warner Bros.	
November 10	Purple Rain	Prince and the Revolution / Soundtrack	Warner Bros.	
November 17	Purple Rain	Prince and the Revolution / Soundtrack	Warner Bros.	
November 24	Purple Rain	Prince and the Revolution / Soundtrack	Warner Bros.	
December 1	Purple Rain	Prince and the Revolution / Soundtrack	Warner Bros.	
December 8	Purple Rain	Prince and the Revolution / Soundtrack	Warner Bros.	
December 15	Purple Rain	Prince and the Revolution / Soundtrack	Warner Bros.	
December 22	Purple Rain	Prince and the Revolution / Soundtrack	Warner Bros.	
December 29	Purple Rain	Prince and the Revolution / Soundtrack	Warner Bros.	

== See also ==
- 1984 in music
- List of Billboard 200 number-one albums
