= World Soundtrack Awards 2004 =

Belgian music awards ceremony

The 4th World Soundtrack Awards were awarded on 9 October 2004 at the 31st Flanders International Film Festival in Ghent, Belgium.

== Winners ==
- Soundtrack Composer of the Year:
  - Gabriel Yared - Cold Mountain
- Best Original Soundtrack of the Year:
  - Cold Mountain - Gabriel Yared
- Best Original Song Written for a Film:
  - "You Will Be My Ain True Love" - Cold Mountain
    - Composed by Sting
    - Performed by: Alison Krauss
    - Lyrics by Sting
- Discovery of the Year:
  - Gustavo Santaolalla - 21 Grams
- Public Choice Award:
  - Harry Potter and the Prisoner of Azkaban - John Williams
- Lifetime Achievement Award:
  - Alan and Marilyn Bergman
- Major Contribution to the Art of Film Music and Sound
  - Prince & The Revolution - Purple Rain
- Best Young Belgian Composer
  - Steven Prengels for Wekker Tam-Tam
