= Computer Blue =

Song by Prince and the Revolution

from the album Purple Rain
- Released: June 25, 1984
- Recorded: August 8, 1983
- Studio: The Warehouse (Minneapolis, Minnesota); Sunset Sound (Los Angeles, California)
- Genre: Synth-funk
- Length: 3:59; 12:18 ("Hallway Speech" version)
- Label: Warner Bros.
- Songwriters: Prince; John L. Nelson; Wendy Melvoin; Lisa Coleman; Matthew Robert Fink
- Producers: Prince and the Revolution

"Computer Blue" is a song by Prince and the Revolution. Released on June 25, 1984, it is the fourth track on Prince's sixth album, Purple Rain, which also served as the soundtrack to the film of the same name. In the film, the song represents Prince's character's angst at the budding relationship between the characters played by Morris Day and Apollonia, the latter of whom he desires, and he performs it in front of the two during the Revolution's set at a nightclub with the aim of upsetting them. The song was composed by Prince with credit to his father, John L. Nelson, for the guitar solo based on a piano instrumental written by Nelson and Prince. He titled the instrumental piece "Father's Song" and recorded it on piano for the film, though onscreen it was portrayed as being played by Prince's character's father, played by Clarence Williams III. On the box-set Purple Rain Deluxe (2017), a different and longer recording of "Father's Song" was included.

"Computer Blue" was originally recorded at The Warehouse studio in Minneapolis with the Revolution a day after "Let's Go Crazy", and was later overdubbed at Sunset Sound Recorders in Los Angeles in August 1983. Prince, along with Wendy & Lisa and sound engineer Susan Rogers, set about doing further work on what would later end up being placed on the album Purple Rain, albeit in a very heavily edited form. The song begins with spoken lyrics by Wendy & Lisa which suggest a dominatrix-type relationship. The song then explodes into an experimental rock number with screaming, heavy synths, distorted guitars, and lyrics about the relationship between humans and computers. The released version has only one verse; the version that debuted at the First Avenue nightclub had a second verse, as did the song when it was originally recorded, and this original recording (later released as the "Hallway Speech" version) lasts for over 12 minutes.

== Outtake ==
Originally conceived as a 14-minute opus, "Computer Blue" would later be edited down several times for inclusion on Purple Rain. The song was edited from a fully-mastered 7:30 down to its current length when "Take Me with U" was added to the album at the last minute. The full-length version of the song contains extended instrumental solos and additional lyrics. Also present is a repeated synthesizer segment with a sing-a-long chant, which was often played in live versions of the song. The synth part, without the vocals, made it into the film Purple Rain during a scene in which the Revolution rehearses while waiting for Prince to arrive. The track ends with three full minutes of screeching feedback. A shorter version, 12 minutes in length, was the one edited down to the album's version, and the feedback from this version forms the segue into "Darling Nikki" on Purple Rain itself. Widely regarded by hardcore Prince fans as a masterpiece, the original unedited recording features the infamous "Hallway Speech" (as termed by fans) about emotions likened to different rooms. During the Purple Rain performance, at the end of the song before "Darling Nikki" begins, the "Righteous 1" speech spoken by Wendy & Lisa cut from the final version of the track is played. A 12:18 edit of the "Hallway Speech" version was officially released on the 2017 deluxe re-release of Purple Rain.

=== "Father's Song" ===
The track's middle section stems from a piano piece written by Prince's father, John L. Nelson. The piece, named "Father's Song", was later recorded by Prince after "Computer Blue" in October 1983. This first version was filled with piano and synthesizers with drums, but after overdubs were completed, it was dropped and replaced by a solo piano version in February 1984 for use in the movie. The synthesizer version of "Father's Song" would later appear on the 2017 deluxe re-release of Purple Rain, while the solo piano version has seen no release outside of the film.

== Personnel ==
Credits are adapted from Duane Tudahl, Benoît Clerc, Guitarcloud, the Prince Vault and the album's liner notes.

- Prince – lead and backing vocals, electric lead guitar, Yamaha CP-80 electric grand piano, synthesizers, Linn LM-1
- Wendy Melvoin – electric rhythm guitar, spoken intro, backing vocals
- Lisa Coleman – Oberheim OB-SX, spoken intro, backing vocals
- Dr. Matt Fink – Oberheim OB-Xa, backing vocals
- Brown Mark – bass guitar, backing vocals
- Bobby Z. – Simmons SDSV, Linn LM-1, Pearl SY-1 Syncussion, cymbals

== References in other media ==
In a "Charlie Murphy's True Hollywood Stories" sketch on Chappelle's Show, "Computer Blue" is referenced as the name of a play drawn up by Prince (Dave Chappelle) while playing Murphy in basketball.
