= Purple Rain (film) =

1984 film by Albert Magnoli

- Theatrical release poster
- Directed by: Albert Magnoli
- Written by: Albert Magnoli; William Blinn
- Produced by: Robert Cavallo; Joseph Ruffalo; Steven Fargnoli
- Starring: Prince; Apollonia Kotero; Morris Day; Olga Karlatos; Clarence Williams III
- Cinematography: Donald E. Thorin
- Edited by: Albert Magnoli
- Music by: Prince and the Revolution; Michel Colombier
- Production company: Purple Films
- Distributed by: Warner Bros.
- Release date: July 27, 1984
- Running time: 111 minutes
- Country: United States
- Language: English
- Budget: $7.2 million
- Box office: $70.3 million

Purple Rain is a 1984 American romantic rock musical drama film directed by Albert Magnoli from a screenplay co-written by Magnoli and William Blinn. It stars Prince (in his feature film debut), Apollonia Kotero, Morris Day, Olga Karlatos, and Clarence Williams III. In the film, the Kid (Prince), a rising musician, grapples with his turbulent personal life as he competes with rival local musician Morris (Day).

Development on Purple Rain began in 1982, stemming from Prince's desire to star in a film: his manager, Robert Cavallo, commissioned Blinn to adapt plot points written by Prince into a screenplay. Magnoli was hired as director and changed several elements of Blinn's initial screenplay. Casting for Purple Rain was extensive, with studio executives attempting to replace Prince as the film's lead. Principal photography began in October 1983 and lasted until that December, with filming primarily taking place across Minneapolis. Production faced delays or schedule alterations due to a feud between Day and Prince.

Purple Rain was theatrically released in the United States on July 27, 1984, by Warner Bros. Pictures. It grossed $70.3 million worldwide and received mixed reviews from critics, with praise for Prince's score and its soundtrack but criticism for its depiction of its female characters. The film won for Best Original Score at the 57th Academy Awards and its songs "When Doves Cry", "Let's Go Crazy", and "Purple Rain" went platinum in the United States. In 2019, the film was selected for preservation in the U.S. National Film Registry by the Library of Congress for being "culturally, historically, or aesthetically significant".

== Plot ==
The Kid is the talented but troubled frontman of his Minneapolis-based band The Revolution. To escape his abusive home life, The Kid spends his days rehearsing and nights performing at the First Avenue nightclub.

The Revolution, the flashy Morris Day and his group the Time, and Dez Dickerson and his group the Modernaires hold the nightclub's three house band slots. Morris, aware that the Revolution's guitarist Wendy and keyboardist Lisa are frustrated that The Kid is unwilling to play their compositions, lobbies Billy Sparks, the club's owner, to replace The Revolution with a girl group which Morris is already forming. Morris targets The Kid's girlfriend Apollonia, an aspiring singer and new arrival to Minneapolis, to lead his group, and tries to persuade her that The Kid is too self-centered to help her. She eventually joins Morris's group, which Morris names Apollonia 6. When Apollonia reveals her newfound partnership to The Kid, he becomes furious and slaps her.

At the club, The Kid responds to the band's internal strife, the pressure to draw larger crowds, and his strained private life with the uncomfortably personal "Darling Nikki". His performance publicly humiliates Apollonia, who runs off in tears, and angers both Morris and Billy, worsening his situation. Billy confronts The Kid, castigating him for bringing his emotional baggage onto the stage, before warning him that he is wasting his musical talent as his father did. Apollonia 6 successfully debuts, and Billy warns The Kid that his First Avenue slot is at risk.

The Kid seizes Apollonia from a drunken Morris, leading them to argue and fight; Apollonia then abandons him. Returning home, The Kid finds the house in tatters, with his mother nowhere to be found. His abusive father, who had been lurking in the basement with a loaded handgun, attempts suicide with a gunshot to his head. Frenzied after a night of torment, The Kid tears apart the basement to release his frustration, only to find a large box of his father's musical compositions. The next morning, The Kid picks up a cassette tape of one of Wendy and Lisa's compositions, a rhythm track named "Slow Groove", and begins to compose.

That night at First Avenue, all is quiet in the Revolution's dressing room until the Time stops by to taunt The Kid. Once on stage, The Kid announces that he will be playing "a song the girls in the band wrote", dedicated to his father, revealed to be "Purple Rain". As the song ends, The Kid rushes from the stage and out the back door of the club, intending to ride away on his motorcycle; before he can, however, The Kid realizes that "Purple Rain" has thrilled the crowd.

The Kid returns to the club, with his fellow musicians greeting him with approval and a teary-eyed Apollonia embracing him. The Kid returns to the stage for two encores with the Revolution ("I Would Die 4 U" and "Baby I'm a Star") to the wild approval of the crowd and even Morris. Overlaid scenes show The Kid visiting his parents in the hospital and sorting his father's compositions in the basement, accompanied by Apollonia. A montage of all the songs plays as the credits roll.

== Cast ==
Prince in a promotional photo as The Kid

- Prince as The Kid
- Apollonia Kotero as Apollonia
- Morris Day as Morris
- Olga Karlatos as Mother
- Clarence Williams III as Father / "Francis L"
- Jerome Benton as Jerome
- Billy Sparks as Billy
- Jill Jones as Jill
- Dez Dickerson as Dez
- Wendy Melvoin as Wendy
- Lisa Coleman as Lisa
- The Revolution as themselves
- The Time as themselves
- Apollonia 6 as themselves

== Production ==
=== Development ===
After the success of his album 1999, Prince confronted his then-manager Robert Cavallo and told him he would not renew his contract with him unless he got to star in a studio film. Every studio they had met with rejected the premise of a musician-led film, leading Cavallo to produce the film himself. David Geffen and Richard Pryor were among those who passed on the film. Prince spent months writing down the basic plot points of the film. Impressed with his work on Fame, Cavallo commissioned William Blinn to write the script. Blinn's original script, titled Dreams, was much darker.

Reckless director James Foley was offered to direct the film, but was not interested and instead passed it on to his editor Albert Magnoli, who disliked Blinn's script for lacking "truth", and was then hired to direct and edit after delivering a pitch on the spot to Cavallo. Allegedly during the first meeting with Warner Bros., the studio executives asked Cavallo if John Travolta could replace Prince as the film's lead.

Prince intended to cast Vanity, leader of the girl group Vanity 6, but she left the group before filming began. Her role was initially offered to Jennifer Beals (who turned it down because she wanted to concentrate on college) before going to Apollonia Kotero, who was then virtually unknown. Prince had seen her appearance on the February 1983 episode of Tales of the Gold Monkey. Lorraine Bracco at one point was considered for the role but the producers found out that she couldn’t sing so they rejected her. Excluding Prince and his onscreen parents, almost every character in the movie is named after the actor who plays them. Despite what was depicted in the film, both of Prince's real parents were Black. Reportedly, Prince's mother was upset that a white woman was cast to play his mother. Kotero was the last to audition and caught the eye of Magnoli. Kotero had no background in singing and was doubled by Lisa Coleman in her vocals on "Take Me With U".

After the character change from Vanity to Apollonia, the script was drastically revised, and many dark scenes were cut. Some of these scenes include Prince and Apollonia having sex in a barn (a concept which was the story behind the 1985 song "Raspberry Beret"); Prince going to Apollonia 6's rehearsal and physically fighting with the members of The Time; and a scene which featured Prince's mother talking to him about her shaky relationship with his father. In addition, many scenes such as the "Lake Minnetonka" scene, Apollonia first meeting Morris, and the railyard scene were cut down because of time constraints. Many clips from these scenes were featured, however, in the trailer for the movie as well as the "When Doves Cry" and "Let's Go Crazy" montage. Prince required the other musicians in the film to take acting classes prior to filming. Morris Day was supposedly kicked out of the classes for "clowning around".

=== Filming ===
Principal photography began on October 31, 1983, in Minneapolis, Minnesota, and spanned 42 days. The film features many local landmarks, including the Crystal Court of the IDS Center (also shown in segments of the opening credits to The Mary Tyler Moore Show) and the First Avenue nightclub, which was paid $100,000 for usage during filming and was closed for 25 days. According to Alan Leeds, several days of shooting were altered due to Day refusing to show up to set due to a rivalry with Prince.

The Huntington Hotel, where Apollonia stayed, is located on Main Street in downtown Los Angeles. In the film, it is supposed to be across the street from First Avenue. In the film, Prince rides a customized Hondamatic Honda CM400A motorcycle. The road north from Henderson Station, Minnesota, along the Minnesota River was the setting for the motorcycle ride scenes. Some of the First Avenue scenes were shot at The Wiltern.

During production, Magnoli asked Prince to write one more song that touched on the themes of the film. The following day, Prince already had the song, "When Doves Cry", fully produced.

Although Warner Bros. considered the film "outrageous" at the time, it was accepted for distribution after an internal debate. Music industry publicist Howard Bloom had advocated for the film to be released and said that "killing Purple Rain would be a sin against art!".

== Music ==
The film is tied into the album of the same name, which spawned two chart-topping singles, "When Doves Cry" and the opening number "Let's Go Crazy", as well as "Purple Rain", which reached number two. The film won an Academy Award for Best Original Song Score. The soundtrack sold over 15 million copies in the United States alone, and 25 million worldwide. The film also coincided with spin-off albums by The Time (Ice Cream Castle) and Apollonia 6 (their self-titled album).

Purple Rain became Prince's first album to reach number one on the Billboard 200. The album spent 24 consecutive weeks atop on the Billboard 200 and was present on the chart for a total of 167 weeks. "When Doves Cry" and "Let's Go Crazy" reached number one on the Billboard Hot 100, while "Purple Rain" peaked at number two and "I Would Die 4 U" peaked at number eight. In May 1996, the album was certified 13× Platinum by the Recording Industry Association of America (RIAA). It is Prince's commercial peak, with total sales standing at 25 million copies worldwide, making it one of the best-selling albums of all time. Prince and the Revolution won Grammy Awards for Best Rock Performance by a Duo or Group with Vocal and Best Score Soundtrack for Visual Media, while Prince also won the Academy Award for Best Original Song Score for the film Purple Rain.

Music critics noted the innovative and experimental aspects of the soundtrack's music, most famously on the spare, bass-less "When Doves Cry". Other aspects of the music, especially its synthesis of electronic elements with organic instrumentation and full-band performances along with its consolidation of rock and R&B, were identified by critics as distinguishing, even experimental factors. Purple Rain is regularly ranked among the greatest albums of all time. Rolling Stone ranked the album number eight on its list of the 500 Greatest Albums of All Time. It was inducted into the Grammy Hall of Fame and added to the Library of Congress' National Recording Registry list of sound recordings that are "culturally, historically, or aesthetically significant".

- "Let's Go Crazy" – Prince and the Revolution
- "Jungle Love" – The Time
- "Take Me with U" – Prince and the Revolution featuring Apollonia
- "Modernaire" – Dez Dickerson and the Modernaires
- "Possessed" – Prince and the Revolution
- "The Beautiful Ones" – Prince and the Revolution
- "God (Love Theme from Purple Rain)" – Prince
- "When Doves Cry" – Prince
- “Father’s Song” – Prince
- "Computer Blue" – Prince and the Revolution
- "Darling Nikki" – Prince and the Revolution
- "Sex Shooter" – Apollonia 6
- "The Bird" – The Time
- "Purple Rain" – Prince and the Revolution
- "I Would Die 4 U" – Prince and the Revolution
- "Baby I'm a Star" – Prince and the Revolution

== Release ==
Purple Rain was released on July 27, 1984, by Warner Bros. Pictures.

=== Home media ===
Warner Home Video released Purple Rain on VHS, Betamax and LaserDisc in 1984 while the film was still in theaters. At the time, it was one of the first major releases to be sold at the lower listed price of $29.95 in the United States. It shipped 435,000 units. It was released on DVD in 1999. The film was released on Blu-ray and HD DVD on July 24, 2007. On October 4, 2016, a remastered Blu-ray with higher-quality AVC encoded video in the film's original 1.85:1 aspect ratio (compared to the 2007 Blu-ray's VC-1 encode and 16:9 aspect ratio) was released as part of the Prince Movie Collection in a purple keep case (as opposed to the normal blue). To celebrate the 40th anniversary of its theatrical release, Purple Rain was released on 4K Blu-ray on June 25, 2024.

== Reception ==
=== Box office ===
The film was commercially successful, grossing $68,392,977 in the United States. It grossed $70.3 million worldwide against its $7.2 million budget.

=== Critical response ===
On Rotten Tomatoes, the film has a 73% rating based on 59 reviews and an average rating of 6.50/10. The website's critical consensus reads: "Purple Rain makes for undeniably uneven cinema, but it's held together by its star's singular charisma – not to mention a slew of classic songs." On Metacritic, it has a score of 55 out of 100 based on 14 reviews, indicating "mixed or average reviews". Prince famously said after the movie opened that he had a nightmare that Roger Ebert and Gene Siskel hated the movie and tore it apart on their TV show; in fact, both critics loved Purple Rain and put it on their Top 10 lists of the best films in 1984. Roger Ebert would go on to call it "one of the greatest rock movies of all time".

In recent years, some have criticised the film as misogynistic, especially the scene in which Jerome throws a woman into a dumpster at Morris's behest. David Alm in Forbes wrote that the female characters are treated "quite literally like garbage." Tom Leatham of Far Out wrote that the film "(explores) eroticism and sexuality with a complete disregard for the respect of women (and) shocking misogyny" with "little redemption", going so far as to call for the film to be removed from the United States National Film Registry.

Others have perceived the film's treatment of women as a criticism of misogyny, rather than an endorsement of it. "Prince saw fit to hide in plain sight behind celluloid and glamour", wrote Ben Philpott of Drowned in Sound. "The conflict between commercialism, integrity, sex, misogyny and morality is clear and nobody has done it better since." Elwin Cotman of Bright Wall/Dark Room also wrote that the film paved the way for later films by Spike Lee, as a then-revolutionary depiction of flawed, complicated Black men:

Purple Rain is a story about misogynists, and about misogyny itself; hatred of women undergirds the film’s motif wherein Black men treat white women like trash, sometimes literally. There is deep-seated racial resentment to all the beatings, pranks, gaslighting, and insults. And unlike most Hollywood films, where actors ranging from Leonardo DiCaprio to Woody Allen portray misogyny as heroic, Purple Rain dares to make it a sign of weakness and disintegration, rooted in trauma... Magnoli presents The Kid’s treatment of women as a denial of his feminine side. Such in-depth psychology for a Black male character was uncommon at the time.

=== Accolades ===
Award	Category	Nominee(s)	Result	Ref.
Academy Awards	Best Original Song Score	Prince	Won	
Brit Awards	Best Soundtrack/Cast Recording	Purple Rain	Won	
Golden Globe Awards	Best Original Song	"When Doves Cry"; Music and Lyrics by Prince	Nominated	
Golden Raspberry Awards	Worst New Star	Apollonia Kotero	Nominated	
Golden Raspberry Awards	Worst Original Song	"Sex Shooter"; Music and Lyrics by Prince	Nominated	
Grammy Awards	Album of the Year	Purple Rain – Prince and the Revolution (Mark Brown, Lisa Coleman, Matt Fink, Wendy Melvoin, Prince, and Robert B. Rivkin)	Nominated	
Grammy Awards	Best Rock Performance by a Duo or Group with Vocal	Purple Rain – Prince and the Revolution	Won	
Grammy Awards	Best Album of Original Score Written for a Motion Picture or Television Special	Purple Rain – Lisa Coleman, Wendy Melvoin, John L. Nelson, and Prince	Won	
Grammy Awards	Producer of the Year (Non-Classical)	Prince and the Revolution (Mark Brown, Lisa Coleman, Matt Fink, Wendy Melvoin, Prince, and Robert B. Rivkin)	Nominated	
NAACP Image Awards	Outstanding Actor in a Motion Picture	Prince	Won	
National Film Preservation Board	National Film Registry		Inducted	
Online Film & Television Association Awards	Film Hall of Fame: Songs	"When Doves Cry"	Inducted	
Saturn Awards	Best Music	Michel Colombier	Nominated	
World Soundtrack Awards	Major Contribution to the Art of Film Music and Sound	Purple Rain – Prince and the Revolution	Won	

The film is recognized by American Film Institute in these lists:

- 2004: AFI's 100 Years...100 Songs:
  - "Let's Go Crazy" – Nominated
- 2006: AFI's Greatest Movie Musicals – Nominated

== Legacy ==
In 1986, Prince followed up Purple Rain with Under the Cherry Moon, a black and white screwball comedy shot on location in the south of France in an Old Hollywood style. Prince starred as the lead character and also directed the film himself, while Benton returned as his sidekick. While the Parade soundtrack album was a hit, initial critical reception of the film was largely negative with many thrown off by the completely different tone from Purple Rain. Later years saw critical re-evaluation of Under the Cherry Moon in a more positive light, and the development of a cult following.

In 1987, Prince directed Sign o' the Times, a concert film based on the Sign o' the Times Tour. He returned to narrative filmmaking with 1990's Graffiti Bridge, a direct sequel to Purple Rain which follows up on the rivalry between Morris Day and The Kid. It was largely negatively received, but again the soundtrack album was a success.

Eminem's loosely autobiographical 2002 feature film 8 Mile is often compared to Purple Rain and has been even called "identical" in plot: "Young musician character in a grungy upper Midwest city first fails and then succeeds in musical battle against a hated rival musician."

In 2015, a Tuareg-language-remake of Purple Rain starring the Nigerien guitarist Mdou Moctar entitled Akounak Tedalat Taha Tazoughai ("Rain the Color of Blue with a Little Red In It") was released. That same year, Prince purchased the house on Snelling Avenue in the Longfellow community that was used for exterior scenes of The Kid's family home in the original. It remains the property of his estate and is now a popular tourist destination.

After Prince's death on April 21, 2016, Purple Rain was screened in cinemas throughout the world, including widely in Australia, New Zealand, Canada and on hundreds of screens across the United States. Several TV stations also aired it, including MTV and VH1.

== Musical adaptation ==
In January 2024, it was announced that producer Orin Wolf would be adapting the film into a Broadway stage musical, with its book written by Brandon Jacobs-Jenkins, and directed by Lileana Blain-Cruz. On February 6, it was announced that the production would make its world premiere in Spring 2025, playing at Hennepin Theatre Trust's State Theatre in Prince's hometown of Minneapolis, Minnesota. In October 2024, it was announced that the musical will premiere on October 16, 2025. In August 2025, it was announced that Kris Kollins and Rachel Webb were part of the lead cast as The Kid and Apollonia respectfully. Nine days later, the rest of the cast were announced. The musical is planned to show previews on March 12, 2027, with the show officially premiering on Broadway at the Majestic Theatre on April 12.

== Sources ==
- Hahn, Alex (2004). Possessed: The Rise And Fall Of Prince. Billboard Books. ISBN 0-8230-7749-7.
