= Purple Rain (album) =

1984 soundtrack and studio album by Prince and the Revolution

Studio album / soundtrack album by Prince and the Revolution
- Released: June 25, 1984
- Recorded: May 1983 – March 1984
- Venues: First Avenue (Minneapolis, Minnesota)
- Studios: Kiowa Trail Home Studio (Chanhassen, Minnesota); The Warehouse (St. Louis Park, Minnesota); Record Plant (New York City, New York); Sunset Sound (Hollywood, California)
- Genres: Pop; rock; R&B; funk-pop; psychedelia
- Length: 43:55
- Label: Warner Bros.
- Producers: Prince and the Revolution

Prince and the Revolution chronology
| 1999 (1982) | Purple Rain (1984) | Around the World in a Day (1985) |

Singles from Purple Rain
- 1. "When Doves Cry" Released: May 16, 1984; 2. "Let's Go Crazy" Released: July 18, 1984; 3. "Purple Rain" Released: September 26, 1984; 4. "I Would Die 4 U" Released: November 28, 1984; 5. "Take Me with U" Released: January 25, 1985 (US, CA, JP & NZ)

Purple Rain is the sixth studio album by the American musician Prince, featuring his backing band the Revolution. It was released on June 25, 1984, through Warner Bros. Records as the soundtrack album to the 1984 film of the same name. Purple Rain was musically denser than Prince's previous albums, emphasizing full band performances, and multiple layers of guitars, keyboards, electronic synthesizer effects, drum machines, and other instruments. Much of the album has a grandiose, synthesized, and psychedelic substance to the production and performances.

The music on Purple Rain is generally regarded as the most pop-oriented of Prince's career, though a number of elements point towards the more experimental records Prince would release after Purple Rain. The album drew some controversy. Network executives thought the sexual nature in the music video for the album's lead single "When Doves Cry" was too explicit for television. The risqué lyrics of "Darling Nikki" also raised complaints from Tipper Gore and the Parents Music Resource Center and contributed to the implementation of Parental Advisory stickers and imprints on album covers.

Purple Rain was an enormous success, spending 24 consecutive weeks atop the Billboard 200 and being present on the chart for a total of 167 weeks. "When Doves Cry" and "Let's Go Crazy" reached number one on the Billboard Hot 100, while "Purple Rain" and "I Would Die 4 U" were top ten hits. A widespread critical success, critics noted the innovation and experimentation on the album, such as the synthesis of electronic elements with organic instrumentation, as well as the consolidation of rock and R&B. By 1996, the album was certified 13× platinum by the RIAA.

Purple Rain is Prince's commercial peak, with total sales standing at 25 million copies worldwide, making it one of the best-selling albums of all time. Prince and the Revolution received a Grammy Award nomination for Album of the Year and won the Best Rock Performance by a Duo or Group with Vocal and Best Score Soundtrack for Visual Media awards. Frequently recognized as one of the greatest albums of all time, Purple Rain was inducted into the Grammy Hall of Fame and added to the Library of Congress's National Recording Registry list of sound recordings that are "culturally, historically, or aesthetically significant".

== Background ==
Following the commercial breakthrough of 1999 (1982), Prince secured a position for renewing his contract with Warner Bros. He told the label they must finance a major motion picture starring himself, with accompanying new songs as its soundtrack, or he would leave the label. Though executives were reluctant, they eventually accepted the offer, approving a $7 million budget for the film. Purple Rain was initially conceived as a double album, but during post-production, Prince decided to make it a single album instead.

Initial production for Purple Rain began in 1983. Prince wrote over 100 songs for the album, selecting nine after deciding which worked best in the context of the film. His backing band, the Revolution, was formally named and expanded in 1983 to include guitarist Wendy Melvoin and keyboardist Lisa Coleman. Rehearsals took place in a warehouse in St. Louis Park, Minneapolis, which served as the project's headquarters.

== Recording and production ==
The Revolution member Doctor Fink told PopMatters in 2009 the recording of the album was "a very creative time ... There was a lot of influence and input from band members towards what [Prince] was doing. He was always open to anybody trying to contribute creatively to the process of writing ... But Prince was the main lyricist and melody maker for all the songs ... and never took any lyrical content from people." Melvoin told Mojo in 1997 the band members were "absolute musical equals in the sense that Prince respected us, and allowed us to contribute to the music without any interference ... I think the secret to our working relationship was that we were very non-possessive about our ideas, as opposed to some other people that have worked with him."

The album was mostly written and recorded between May 1983 and March 1984, with "Baby I'm a Star" dating to 1981. The last three songs on the album—"I Would Die 4 U", "Baby I'm A Star" and the title track "Purple Rain"—were recorded live at the 3 August 1983 First Avenue show in Minneapolis, although overdubs and edits took place on all three in September 1983; this marked Prince's first album to include live recordings.

== Music and lyrics ==
Purple Rain was musically denser than Prince's previous albums, emphasizing full band performances, and multiple layers of guitars, keyboards, electronic synthesizer effects, drum machines, and other instruments. As a soundtrack record, much of the music had a grandiose, synthesized, and even – by some evaluations – a psychedelic sheen to the production and performances. The music on Purple Rain is generally regarded as the most pop-oriented of Prince's career, though a number of elements point towards the more experimental records Prince would release after Purple Rain. Apollonia 6 member Apollonia recalled that after watching the Purple Rain cinematographic takes, she told Prince, "You know you're going to get an Oscar for this movie – not for the acting, but for the music." The Revolution appears on six tracks: "Let's Go Crazy", "Take Me With U", "Computer Blue", "I Would Die 4 U", "Baby I'm A Star" and "Purple Rain" while the remaining three tracks are essentially solo performances by Prince. Apollonia sings co-lead on "Take Me With U".

Like Prince's previous albums, nearly all tracks on Purple Rain were written by him. Revolution members Fink, Coleman, and Melvoin helped write the album's fourth track "Computer Blue". Doctor Fink, who wrote a keyboard bass line for the track, said he "started playing that main bass groove which later became 'Computer Blue'. So the band [the Revolution] started grooving on it, and Prince started coming up with some stuff, then we recorded a rough version and he took it into the studio and just incorporated it all and made it fly that way. Wendy [Melvoin] and Lisa [Coleman] did some of the stuff on it. Prince borrowed the bridge/portal section from the then-unreleased Father's Song, by his father jazz musician John L. Nelson, who had given him some music over the years to play around with. So the song was a real mixture of different people and influences."

"Take Me with U" was written for the Apollonia 6 album Apollonia 6 (1984), but later enlisted for Purple Rain. Prince wrote and composed the album's lead single "When Doves Cry" after all the other tracks were complete on Purple Rain. In addition to providing vocals, he played all instruments on the track. With there being no bass line, the song's production is noted for being unconventionally bare in comparison to 1980s pop hits. Prince said there originally was a bass line but, after a conversation with singer Jill Jones, he decided the song was too conventional with it included. The risqué lyrics of "Darling Nikki" contributed to the use of Parental Advisory stickers and imprints on album covers that were the record label's answer to complaints from Tipper Gore and the Parents Music Resource Center (PMRC).

"Purple Rain" was originally written as a country song and intended to be a collaboration with Stevie Nicks. According to Nicks, she received a ten-minute instrumental version of the song from Prince with a request to write the lyrics, but felt overwhelmed. She said: "I listened to it and I just got scared. I called him back and said, 'I can't do it. I wish I could. It's too much for me.'" At a rehearsal, Prince then asked his backing band to try the song: "I want to try something before we go home. It's mellow." According to the Revolution member Lisa Coleman, Prince then changed the song after the Revolution's Wendy Melvoin started playing guitar chords to accompany the song: "He was excited to hear it voiced differently. It took it out of that country feeling. Then we all started playing it a bit harder and taking it more seriously. We played it for six hours straight and by the end of that day we had it mostly written and arranged."

== Artwork and title ==
The album cover for Purple Rain was photographed at the Warner Bros. Studio Backlot in California. The area known as Hennesy St, designed to look like a New York tenement area, was the location of the balcony where the album photo was taken. The cover features Prince on a customized 1981 Honda CM400A motorcycle, in an ornate purple suit.

Regarding the meaning of "Purple Rain", both Mikel Toombs of The San Diego Union and Bob Kostanczuk of the Post-Tribune have written that Prince took the title "Purple Rain" from lyrics in the America song "Ventura Highway". Asked to explain the phrase "purple rain" in "Ventura Highway", Gerry Beckley responded: "You got me." However, Prince explained the meaning of "Purple Rain" as follows: "When there's blood in the sky – red and blue = purple ... purple rain pertains to the end of the world and being with the one you love and letting your faith/god guide you through the purple rain." According to Lisa Coleman, it symbolizes "a new beginning. Purple, the sky at dawn; rain, the cleansing factor."

== Promotion ==
=== Tour ===
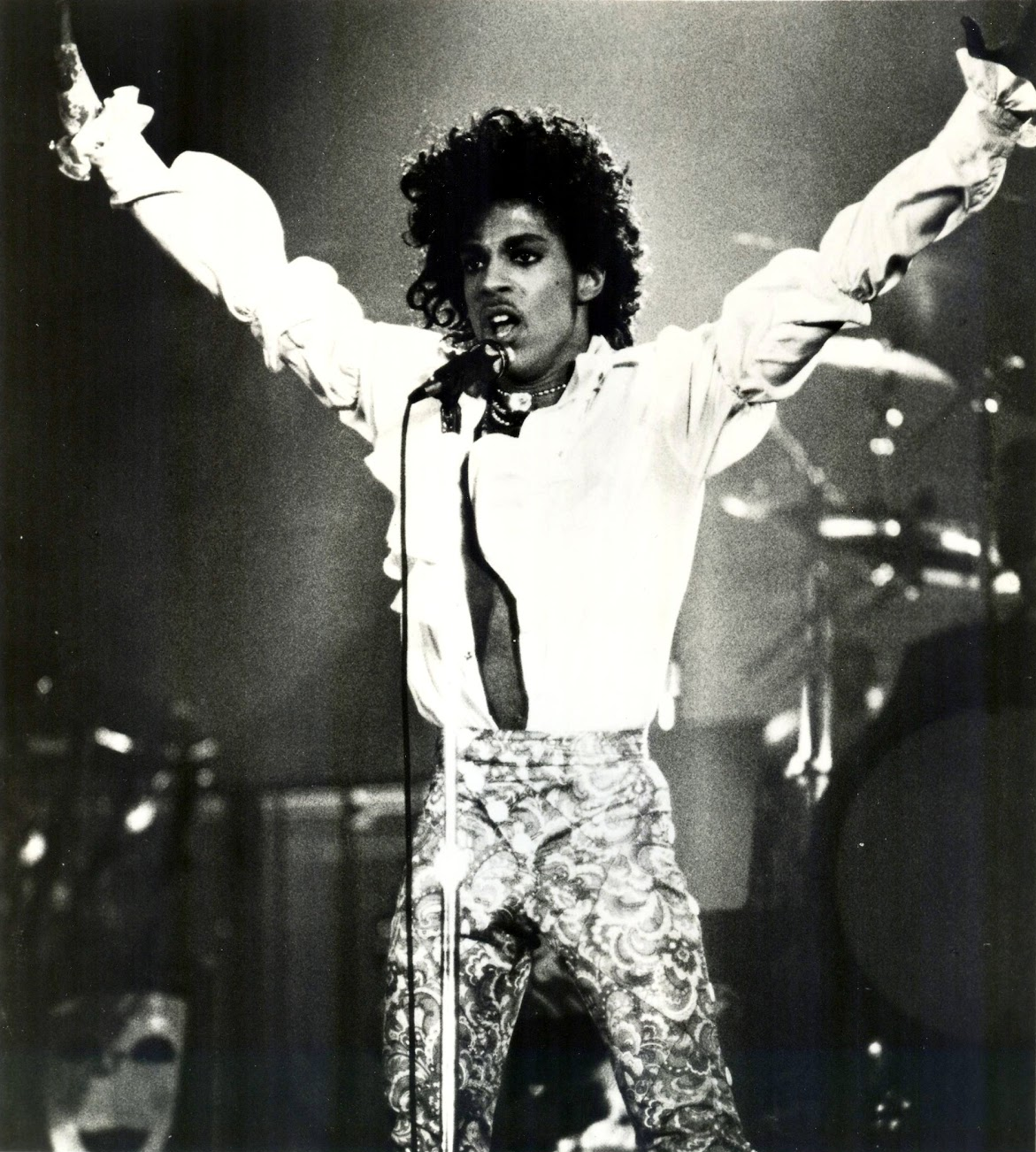
Prince performing during the Purple Rain Tour in 1984

The Purple Rain Tour began at the Joe Louis Arena in Detroit in November 1984. In addition to Prince and the Revolution, the Purple Rain Tour featured Apollonia 6, and Sheila E. and her band. The tour opened with the album's opener, "Let's Go Crazy". Three singles from 1999 (1982) followed: "Delirious", "1999" and "Little Red Corvette". An instrumental interlude of "Yankee Doodle" usually introduced another song from 1999, "Free". The B-side "God" was often played, followed by a usual sequence of "Computer Blue", "Darling Nikki", "The Beautiful Ones" and "When Doves Cry". As encores, the remaining Purple Rain songs closed the concert, "I Would Die 4 U", "Baby I'm a Star" and "Purple Rain".

The tour spanned 98 shows, ending in April 1985, and sold 1.7 million tickets. Prince and the Revolution played the final date of the tour on April 7 to an audience of 55,000 in Miami's Orange Bowl. Prince ended the show saying, "I have to go now. I don't know when I'll be back. I want you to know that God loves you. He loves us all." Two weeks after the end of the tour, Around the World in a Day (1985) was released, which officially brought an end to Prince's Purple Rain era. The tour was considered by Rolling Stone as "groundbreaking in many ways" because it introduced Prince's most "elaborate" sets and featured occasional cameos from Bruce Springsteen and Madonna, which confirmed Prince's place as "pop's most commanding star" during the Purple Rain era.

=== Singles ===
Purple Rain's lead single, "When Doves Cry", was Prince's first Billboard Hot 100 number-one single, staying there for five weeks, and was also a worldwide hit. It was ranked number one on the Billboard Year-End Hot 100 singles of 1984. The music video, directed by Prince himself, premiered on MTV in June 1984. The video sparked controversy among network executives, who thought its sexual nature was too explicit for television.

The second single, "Let's Go Crazy", became Prince's second number-one hit on the Billboard Hot 100. Common to much of Prince's writing, the song is thought to be exhortation to follow Christian ethics, with the "De-elevator" in the lyrics being a metaphor for the Devil.

A power ballad and a combination of rock, R&B, gospel, and orchestral music, "Purple Rain" reached number 2 on the Billboard Hot 100 and stayed there for two weeks. "I Would Die 4 U", the fourth and final Billboard Hot 100 top 10 hit from Purple Rain, reached number eight on the chart. The album's final single, "Take Me with U", was released on January 25, 1985.

== Critical reception ==
Retrospective professional ratings
Aggregate scores
| Source | Rating |
|---|---|
| Metacritic | 100/100 (2015 edition) |
Review scores
| Source | Rating |
| AllMusic | 5/5 stars |
| Blender | 4/5 stars |
| Chicago Sun-Times | 4/4 stars |
| Christgau's Record Guide | A− |
| Entertainment Weekly | B |
| The Guardian | 5/5 stars |
| Mojo | 5/5 stars |
| Pitchfork | 10/10 |
| The Rolling Stone Album Guide | 5/5 stars |
| Spin Alternative Record Guide | 9/10 |

Purple Rain was well received by contemporary critics. Kurt Loder, writing for Rolling Stone in 1984, compared Prince to Jimi Hendrix and praised him for merging "black and white styles": "The spirit of Jimi Hendrix must surely smile down on Prince Rogers Nelson. Like Hendrix, Prince seems to have tapped into some extraterrestrial musical dimension where black and white styles are merely different aspects of the same funky thing. Prince's rock & roll is as authentic and compelling as his soul and his extremism is endearing in a era of play-it-safe record production and formulaic hit mongering."

At the end of 1984, Purple Rain was voted the second best album of the year in the Pazz & Jop, an annual poll of American critics nationwide, published by The Village Voice. However, the newspaper's chief critic and poll creator Robert Christgau was less impressed by the album, saying that while it is "quirky, dangerous, [and] unabashedly pop", it is also plagued by "despair" and, "for Prince ... ingratiatingly unsolipsistic", although he would later call it "seriously gorgeous".

Prince and the Revolution won a 1984 Grammy Award for Purple Rain, for Best Rock Vocal Performance by a Duo or Group, the four composers (Nelson, Coleman, Prince, and Melvoin) won Best Score Soundtrack for Visual Media, and the album was nominated for Album of the Year. Purple Rain also won an Oscar for Best Original Song Score in 1985. It posthumously won Top Soundtrack at the American Music Awards in 2016.

Retrospective appraisals have also been positive. Music critics noted the innovative and experimental aspects of the soundtrack's music, most famously on the spare, bass-less "When Doves Cry". Other aspects of the music, especially its synthesis of electronic elements with organic instrumentation and full-band performances (some, as noted above, recorded live) along with its landmark consolidation of rock and R&B, were identified by critics as distinguishing, even experimental factors.

Stephen Erlewine of AllMusic wrote that Purple Rain finds Prince "consolidating his funk and R&B roots while moving boldly into pop, rock, and heavy metal", as well as "push[ing] heavily into psychedelia" under the influence of the Revolution. Erlewine identified the record's nine songs as "uncompromising ... forays into pop" and "stylistic experiments", echoing general sentiment that Purple Rain's music represented Prince at his most popular without forsaking his experimental bent. In a retrospective review, Kenneth Partridge of Billboard described the album's opening track, "Let's Go Crazy", as "arguably the best intro in pop history".

== Commercial performance ==
In the United States, Purple Rain debuted at number 11 on the Billboard 200 the week of July 14, 1984. After four weeks on the chart, it reached number one on August 4, 1984. The album spent 24 consecutive weeks at number one on the Billboard 200 from August 4, 1984, to January 18, 1985, and more than 32 weeks in the top 10, becoming one of the most successful soundtracks ever. Prince also joined Elvis Presley and the Beatles in being the only artists to have the number-one album, single and film in the U.S. all at the same time.

It traded the number-one position on the chart with Bruce Springsteen's Born in the U.S.A. twice, during 1984 and 1985. Purple Rain was present on the Billboard 200 for one hundred twenty two weeks. After the advent of the Nielsen SoundScan era in 1991, the album sold a further three million copies. By 1996, the album had sold 13 million copies in the United States, making it certified 13× Platinum by the Recording Industry Association of America (RIAA).

In the United Kingdom, Purple Rain entered the UK Albums Chart at number 21 on July 21, 1984, after thirty five weeks on the chart it reached and peaked at number seven during the week of March 16, 1985 and stayed there for a week, it fell off to number twelve the next week. The album remained on the chart for 86 weeks. It was certified 2× Platinum by the BPI on May 1, 1990, denoting shipments of 600,000 units. By 1988, Purple Rain had sold 17 million copies worldwide making it one of the most successful albums of the 1980s. Its sales as of 2008 stood at over 25 million copies worldwide. The album is also multi-platinum in Australia, Canada, New Zealand and the United Kingdom.

== Legacy ==
In 1984, there was only one man in America more popular than President Ronald Reagan. His name was Prince, and he was funky. Had Prince run for president that year, he would have certainly carried his native Minnesota – the only state Ronnie lost – and he probably would've cleaned up most other places. The reason: Purple Rain, his groundbreaking, genre-blurring, utterly genius sixth album. It was a massive seller wherever there were radios and people with pulses.

— Kenneth Partridge of Billboard on Prince's popularity during the Purple Rain era

Purple Rain further established Prince as a figurehead for pop music of the 1980s and is regarded as one of the greatest albums of all time. In 2010, Purple Rain was inducted into the Grammy Hall of Fame. In 2012, the album was added to the Library of Congress's National Recording Registry list of sound recordings that "are culturally, historically, or aesthetically important". Writing for Pitchfork, Carvell Wallace appraised the album's influence and Prince's musicianship, "With Purple Rain, Prince bursts forth from the ghetto created by mainstream radio and launches himself directly onto the Mt. Rushmore of American music. He plays rock better than rock musicians, composes better than jazz guys, and performs better than everyone, all without ever abandoning his roots as a funk man, a party leader, a true MC ... for the 24 weeks Purple Rain spent atop the charts in 1984, the black kid from the midwest had managed to become the most accurate expression we had of young America's overabundance of angst, love, horniness, recklessness, idealism, and hope."

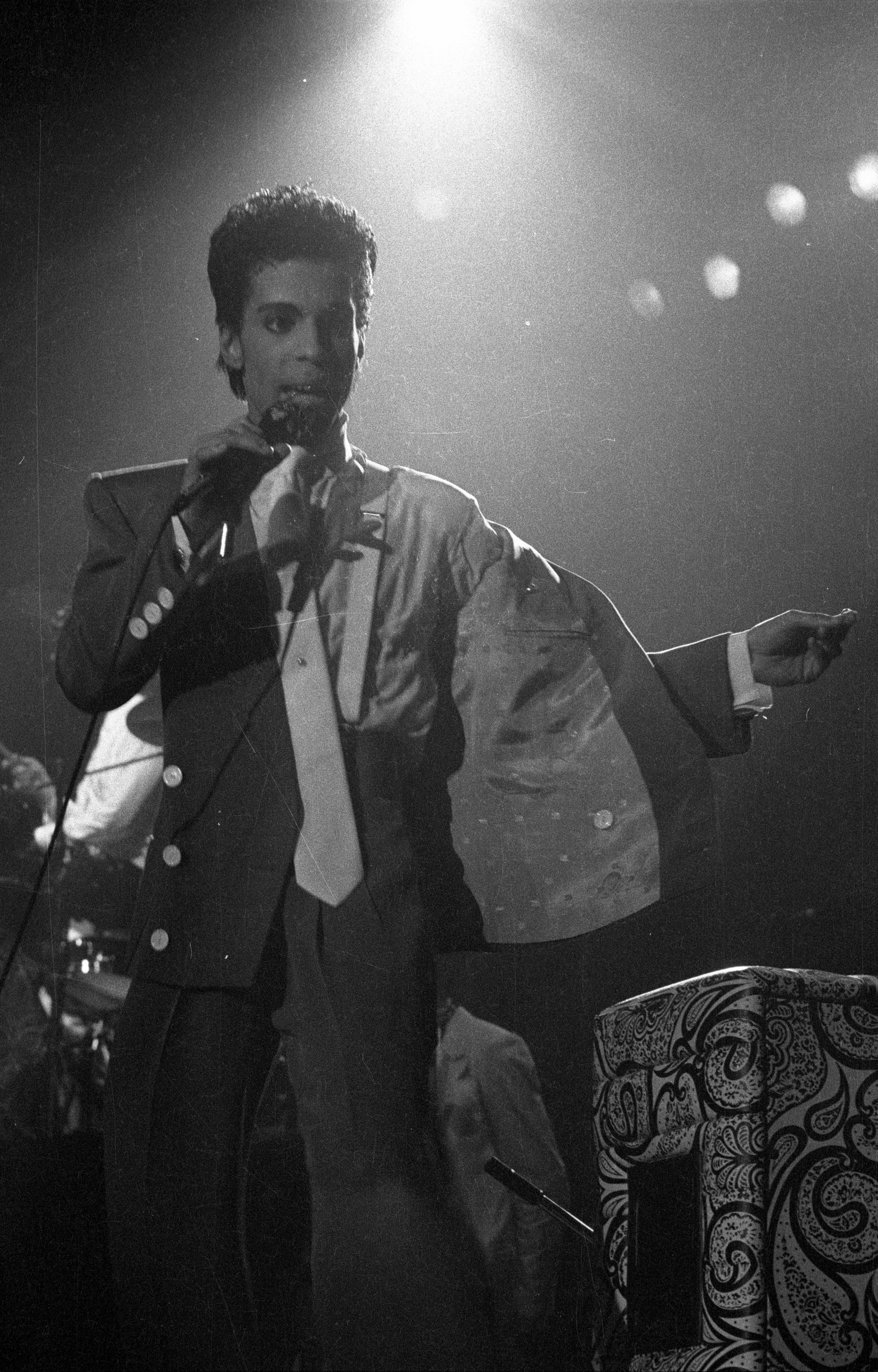
Purple Rain cemented Prince's position as one of the figureheads of pop music.

Described as a "masterpiece" by the Grammy Awards, Ana Yglesias wrote, "Even after his heartbreaking passing, Prince will live on forever in our hearts, through his music, and even on the charts. Purple Rain was inducted into Grammy Hall of Fame in 2011, celebrating it as a 'recording of lasting qualitative or historical significance'. ... It is safe to say there will never be another star quite like Prince." For The New Yorker, Ben Greenmane wrote, "Purple Rain may or may not be Prince's best record, but it came at the best time, propelling him from ordinary stardom (his previous album 1999 put three singles into the Billboard top 20) to supernova status. It created his iconic look (ruffled shirt, purple jacket, motorcycle), formally introduced his most famous backing band (the Revolution), and included the lion's share of the songs most likely to appear in a capsule bio ('When Doves Cry', 'Let's Go Crazy', and the title track)." In Rolling Stone's list of The 25 Greatest Soundtracks of All Time, Purple Rain was described as "an epic celebration of everything rock & roll, which means sex and religion and eyeliner and motorcycles and guitars and Lake Minnetonka".

Chris Gerard wrote for PopMatters that "Purple Rain is one of the cornerstone albums not just of the 80s, but in all of pop/rock history ... at the core of [Prince's] legacy Purple Rain will always stand as his signature triumph, a monument to his boundless talent and ambition." Gerard also praised "When Doves Cry" for being the "gateway" to the "Purple Rain universe: an album, a major motion picture, and a tour that dominated the pop culture landscape of 1984". Andrew Unterberger of Billboard gave the album a high appraisal, regarding it as one of the greatest albums in popular music: "Purple Rain is certainly in contention for the most perfect album in rock or pop history, expertly flowing from track to track while delighting, surprising and astounding at each bend. Personal and universal, familiar and challenging, romantic and narcissistic, religious and orgasmic, accessible to all and profoundly weird, Purple Rain rightly remains the cornerstone of Prince's recorded legacy, almost too obvious in its brilliance to even be worth discussing at length."

=== Rankings ===
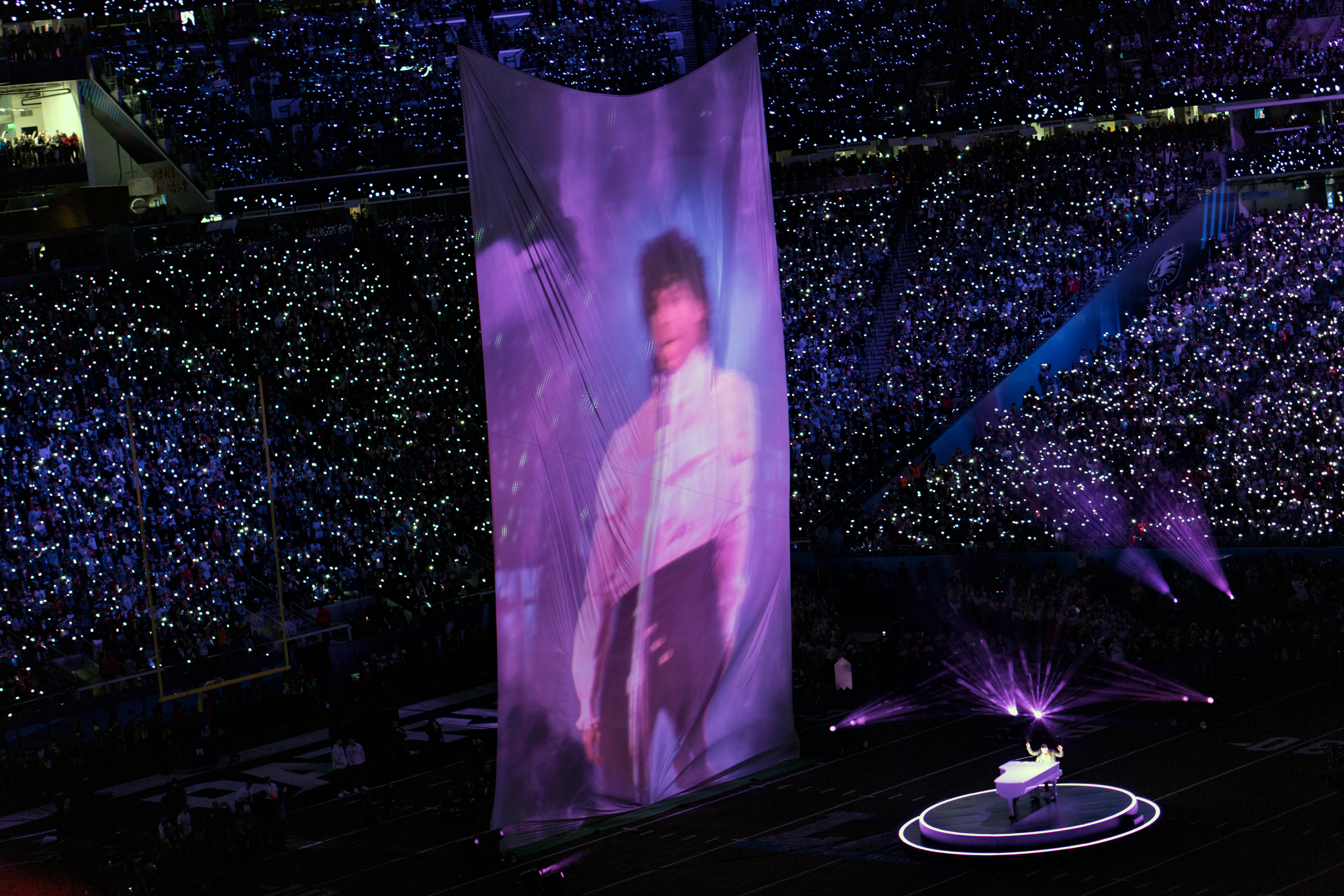
A purple themed tribute to Prince at Justin Timberlake's Super Bowl LII halftime show on February 4, 2018

Purple Rain is regarded as one of the greatest albums of all time by numerous publications. Rolling Stone ranked Purple Rain number two on its list of the 100 Best Albums of the 1980s and number eight on its list of the 500 Greatest Albums of All Time. In their list of The 25 Greatest Soundtracks of All Time, Purple Rain was ranked second, behind the Beatles' Help!. Time included it in its list of the All-Time 100 Albums. The album was ranked 18th on VH1's Greatest Rock and Roll Albums of All Time countdown. The Times ranked Purple Rain at number 15 on its list of the 100 Best Albums of All Time.

In 2007, the editors of Vanity Fair labeled it the best soundtrack of all time, and Tempo magazine named it the greatest album of the 1980s. In 2008, Entertainment Weekly ranked Purple Rain at number one on their New Classics list, the top 50 best albums of the previous 25 years. The album was also included in the 2008 edition of 1001 Albums You Must Hear Before You Die. In 2012, Slant Magazine ranked the album at number two on its list of Best Albums of the 1980s. In 2012, Entertainment Weekly also ranked the album at number two on their list of the 100 Greatest Albums Ever.

In 2018, Pitchfork regarded it as the best album of the 1980s, ranking it at number one on its list of the 200 Best Albums of the 1980s. In 2002, the album was ranked at number 12 on Pitchfork's Top 100 Albums of the decade list. In Billboard's list of All 92 Diamond-Certified Albums Ranked From Worst to Best: Critic's Take, Purple Rain was ranked first. Consequence of Sound, in its ranking of the greatest albums of all time, placed Purple Rain at number one. The 2024 Apple Music 100 Best Albums poll ranked Purple Rain as number four. In its ranking of the 101 Greatest Film Soundtracks of All Time, Rolling Stone ranked Purple Rain as the number one album.

== Reissues ==
Purple Rain was re-issued on June 23, 2017. It is the first Prince album to be remastered and reissued, and was released in a variety of formats, including a 20-track Deluxe edition with unreleased bonus tracks and a 35-track Deluxe Expanded edition with additional B-sides, rarities and a live DVD of the Purple Rain Tour from 1985. The album debuted at number four on the Billboard 200 at with 52,000 album-equivalent units earned in its first week. It debuted at number three on the Top R&B/Hip-Hop Albums chart, its highest peak in 32 years having previously spent 19 weeks atop the chart in 1984. The album debuted at number one on the Top R&B Albums chart and the Vinyl Albums chart.

On June 21, 2024, a Dolby Atmos version of the original album was released to Apple Music and other streaming services. The new mix of the album was created from the original multi-track master tapes by Chris James. On April 25, 2025, this mix would be released on an audiophile Blu-ray, which also included the original 1984 stereo mix in high-definition 24bit / 96 kHz audio.

== Track listing ==
=== Original album ===
All tracks are written by Prince, except "Computer Blue", written by Prince, John L. Nelson, Wendy & Lisa, and Dr. Fink.

Side one
| No. | Title | Length |
|---|---|---|
| 1. | "Let's Go Crazy" | 4:39 |
| 2. | "Take Me with U" | 3:54 |
| 3. | "The Beautiful Ones" | 5:14 |
| 4. | "Computer Blue" | 3:59 |
| 5. | "Darling Nikki" | 4:14 |
| Total length: | | 22:00 |

Side two
| No. | Title | Length |
|---|---|---|
| 6. | "When Doves Cry" | 5:52 |
| 7. | "I Would Die 4 U" | 2:59 |
| 8. | "Baby I'm a Star" | 4:24 |
| 9. | "Purple Rain" | 8:40 |
| Total length: | | 21:55 43:55 |

=== Deluxe and expanded editions ===
The 2017 Deluxe edition consists of two discs, the first being a remaster of the original album made in 2015 overseen by Prince himself and a bonus disc of previously unreleased songs called "From the Vault & Previously Unreleased". The Deluxe Expanded edition consists of two more discs, a disc with all the single edits, maxi-single edits and B-sides from the Purple Rain era and a DVD with a concert from the Purple Rain Tour filmed in Syracuse, New York on March 30, 1985, previously released on home video in 1985.

Disc 1: 2015 remaster
| No. | Title | Length |
|---|---|---|
| 1. | "Let's Go Crazy" (Prince and the Revolution) | 4:39 |
| 2. | "Take Me with U" (Prince and the Revolution) | 3:54 |
| 3. | "The Beautiful Ones" (Prince) | 5:13 |
| 4. | "Computer Blue" (Prince and the Revolution) | 3:59 |
| 5. | "Darling Nikki" (Prince) | 4:14 |
| 6. | "When Doves Cry" (Prince) | 5:54 |
| 7. | "I Would Die 4 U" (Prince and the Revolution) | 2:49 |
| 8. | "Baby I'm a Star" (Prince and the Revolution) | 4:24 |
| 9. | "Purple Rain" (Prince and the Revolution) | 8:41 |

Disc 2: From the Vault & Previously Unreleased
| No. | Title | Length |
|---|---|---|
| 1. | "The Dance Electric" | 11:29 |
| 2. | "Love and Sex" | 5:00 |
| 3. | "Computer Blue" ("Hallway Speech" Version) | 12:18 |
| 4. | "Electric Intercourse" (Studio Version) | 4:57 |
| 5. | "Our Destiny/Roadhouse Garden" | 6:25 |
| 6. | "Possessed" (1984 Version) | 7:56 |
| 7. | "Wonderful Ass" | 6:24 |
| 8. | "Velvet Kitty Cat" | 2:42 |
| 9. | "Katrina's Paper Dolls" | 3:30 |
| 10. | "We Can Fuck" | 10:17 |
| 11. | "Father's Song" | 5:30 |

Disc 3: Single Edits & B-Sides
| No. | Title | Length |
|---|---|---|
| 1. | "When Doves Cry" (7" Single Edit) | 3:48 |
| 2. | "17 Days" (B-Side Edit) | 3:55 |
| 3. | "Let's Go Crazy" (7" Single Edit) | 3:50 |
| 4. | "Let's Go Crazy" (Special Dance Mix) | 7:35 |
| 5. | "Erotic City" (7" B-side Edit) | 3:55 |
| 6. | "Erotic City ("Make Love Not War Erotic City Come Alive")" | 7:24 |
| 7. | "Purple Rain" (7" Single Edit) | 4:05 |
| 8. | "God" (7" B-Side Edit) | 4:03 |
| 9. | "God (Love Theme from Purple Rain)" (Instrumental) | 7:54 |
| 10. | "Another Lonely Christmas" (7" B-Side Edit) | 4:54 |
| 11. | "Another Lonely Christmas" (Extended Version) | 6:47 |
| 12. | "I Would Die 4 U" (7" Single Edit) | 2:58 |
| 13. | "I Would Die 4 U" (Extended Version) | 10:15 |
| 14. | "Baby I'm a Star" (7" B-Side Edit) | 2:55 |
| 15. | "Take Me with U" (7" Single Edit) | 3:44 |

Disc 4: DVD – Live at the Carrier Dome, Syracuse, NY, March 30, 1985
| No. | Title | Length |
|---|---|---|
| 1. | "Let's Go Crazy" | 5:30 |
| 2. | "Delirious" | 2:45 |
| 3. | "1999" | 4:15 |
| 4. | "Little Red Corvette" | 5:10 |
| 5. | "Take Me with U" | 4:15 |
| 6. | "Do Me, Baby" | 4:40 |
| 7. | "Irresistible Bitch" | 2:00 |
| 8. | "Possessed" | 4:24 |
| 9. | "How Come U Don't Call Me Anymore?" | 5:05 |
| 10. | "Let's Pretend We're Married" | 4:15 |
| 11. | "International Lover" | 1:00 |
| 12. | "God" | 8:30 |
| 13. | "Computer Blue" | 4:30 |
| 14. | "Darling Nikki" | 4:00 |
| 15. | "The Beautiful Ones" | 7:30 |
| 16. | "When Doves Cry" | 8:15 |
| 17. | "I Would Die 4 U" | 3:50 |
| 18. | "Baby I'm a Star" | 10:00 |
| 19. | "Purple Rain" | 18:24 |

== Personnel ==
Credits adapted from Michael Aubrecht, Benoît Clerc, Joe Regen, Duane Tudahl, and the album's liner notes.

=== Musicians ===
==== Prince and the Revolution ====
- Prince – lead vocals (all tracks), spoken vocals (track 3), backing vocals (tracks 1–2, 4, 6–9), electric guitar (tracks 1, 3–9), acoustic guitar (track 2), bass (tracks 2–3, 5), Yamaha CP-80 (track 3), synthesizers (tracks 2, 4–9), Oberheim OB-SX (track 3), Yamaha DX7 (track 6), programming (tracks 1, 4, 8), Linn LM-1 (tracks 5–6), LinnDrum (track 2), Simmons SDSV (track 2), drums (tracks 2–3, 5), electronic drums (tracks 3, 5–6), tambourine (track 2), percussion (track 2), claps (track 8)
- Brownmark – backing vocals (tracks 1, 7, 9), bass (tracks 1, 4, 7–9)
- Lisa Coleman – co-lead vocals (track 2), spoken vocals (track 4), backing vocals (tracks 1–2, 4, 7–9), synthesizers (tracks 1, 4, 7–9), claps (track 8)
- Doctor Fink – backing vocals (tracks 1, 7, 9), Yamaha CP-70 (track 9), synthesizers (tracks 1, 4, 8), Memorymoog (track 7), Linn LM-1 (track 7), Oberheim OB-X (track 1)
- Wendy Melvoin – spoken vocals (track 4), backing vocals (tracks 1, 4, 7–9), electric guitar (tracks 1, 4, 7–9)
- Bobby Z. – backing vocals (tracks 7, 9), Linn LM-1 (tracks 1, 4, 7, 9), Simmons SDSV (tracks 1, 4, 7, 9), drums (tracks 1, 4, 7, 9), percussion (tracks 1, 4, 7)

==== Additional musicians ====
- Apollonia – co-lead and backing vocals (track 2)
- Jill Jones – co-lead vocals (track 2), backing vocals (tracks 2, 8)
- David Coleman – cello (tracks 2, 8–9), finger cymbals (track 2)
- Novi Novog – violin (tracks 2, 9), electric violin (track 8)
- Suzie Katayama – cello (tracks 8–9)

=== Production ===
- Prince – producer, strings arrangement (tracks 2, 8–9)
- David Leonard – recording engineer (tracks 1–4, 6–9)
- Susan Rogers – recording engineer (tracks 1–2, 4–5)
- Peggy McCreary – recording engineer (tracks 3–9)
- Don Batts – recording engineer (track 5)
- David Hewitt, Kooster McAllister, David Rivkin – recording engineers (tracks 7–9)
- Lisa Coleman – strings arrangement (tracks 2, 8–9)
- Bernie Grundman – mastering

=== Technical ===
- Prince – clothing (credited for "rags"), art direction
- Laura LiPuma – design
- Ed Thrasher and Associates – front cover photograph
- Ron Slenzak – front cover photograph
- Larry Williams – additional photography
- Doug Henders – painting
- Earl Jones – hair
- Jayson Jeffreys – makeup
- Louis & Vaughn – clothing (credited for "rags")
- Marie France – clothing (credited for "rags")

== Charts ==
=== Weekly charts ===
1984–1985 weekly chart performance for Purple Rain
| Chart (1984–1985) | Peak position |
|---|---|
| Australian Albums (Kent Music Report) | 1 |
| Austrian Albums (Ö3 Austria) | 8 |
| Canada Top Albums/CDs (RPM) | 1 |
| Dutch Albums (Album Top 100) | 1 |
| Finnish Albums (Suomen virallinen lista) | 15 |
| French Albums (SNEP) | 8 |
| German Albums (Offizielle Top 100) | 5 |
| Japanese Oricon LPs Chart | 12 |
| New Zealand Albums (RMNZ) | 2 |
| Norwegian Albums (VG-lista) | 4 |
| Swedish Albums (Sverigetopplistan) | 3 |
| Swiss Albums (Schweizer Hitparade) | 7 |
| UK Albums (Official Charts) | 7 |
| US Billboard 200 | 1 |
| US Top R&B/Hip-Hop Albums (Billboard) | 1 |
| Zimbabwean Albums (ZIMA) | 1 |

2016 weekly chart performance for Purple Rain
| Chart (2016) | Peak position |
|---|---|
| Australian Albums (ARIA) | 5 |
| Canadian Albums (Billboard) | 7 |
| Finnish Albums (Suomen virallinen lista) | 36 |
| Italian Albums (FIMI) | 42 |
| UK Albums (Official Charts) | 4 |
| US Billboard 200 | 2 |
| US Soundtrack Albums (Billboard) | 1 |

2017 weekly chart performance for Purple Rain
| Chart (2017) | Peak position |
|---|---|
| Austrian Albums (Ö3 Austria) | 9 |
| Belgian Albums (Ultratop Flanders) | 4 |
| Belgian Albums (Ultratop Wallonia) | 13 |
| Dutch Albums Chart | 3 |
| French Albums (SNEP) | 32 |
| Italian Albums (FIMI) | 13 |
| Portuguese Albums (AFP) | 22 |
| Spanish Albums (Promusicae) | 13 |
| UK Albums (Official Charts) | 7 |
| US Billboard 200 | 4 |

=== Year-end charts ===
1984 year-end chart performance for Purple Rain
| Chart (1984) | Position |
|---|---|
| Australian Albums (Kent Music Report) | 13 |
| Canadian Albums (RPM) | 2 |
| Dutch Albums (Album Top 100) | 5 |
| French Albums (SNEP) | 53 |
| German Albums (Offizielle Top 100) | 56 |
| New Zealand Albums (RMNZ) | 20 |
| UK Albums (OCC) | 43 |
| US Billboard 200 | 24 |
| US Top R&B/Hip-Hop Albums (Billboard) | 9 |

1985 year-end chart performance for Purple Rain
| Chart (1985) | Position |
|---|---|
| Canadian Albums (RPM) | 41 |
| Dutch Albums (Album Top 100) | 48 |
| German Albums (Offizielle Top 100) | 38 |
| UK Albums (OCC) | 60 |
| US Billboard 200 | 9 |
| US Top R&B/Hip-Hop Albums (Billboard) | 21 |

2013 year-end chart performance for Purple Rain
| Chart (2013) | Position |
|---|---|
| US Soundtrack Albums (Billboard) | 10 |

2015 year-end chart performance for Purple Rain
| Chart (2015) | Position |
|---|---|
| US Soundtrack Albums (Billboard) | 14 |

2016 year-end chart performance for Purple Rain
| Chart (2016) | Position |
|---|---|
| US Billboard 200 | 55 |
| US Soundtrack Albums (Billboard) | 1 |

2017 year-end chart performance for Purple Rain
| Chart (2017) | Position |
|---|---|
| Belgian Albums (Ultratop Flanders) | 105 |
| US Soundtrack Albums (Billboard) | 12 |

2018 year-end chart performance for Purple Rain
| Chart (2018) | Position |
|---|---|
| US Soundtrack Albums (Billboard) | 16 |

2019 year-end chart performance for Purple Rain
| Chart (2019) | Position |
|---|---|
| US Soundtrack Albums (Billboard) | 13 |

2020 year-end chart performance for Purple Rain
| Chart (2020) | Position |
|---|---|
| US Soundtrack Albums (Billboard) | 9 |

2021 year-end chart performance for Purple Rain
| Chart (2021) | Position |
|---|---|
| US Soundtrack Albums (Billboard) | 4 |

2022 year-end chart performance for Purple Rain
| Chart (2022) | Position |
|---|---|
| US Soundtrack Albums (Billboard) | 5 |

2023 year-end chart performance for Purple Rain
| Chart (2023) | Position |
|---|---|
| US Soundtrack Albums (Billboard) | 8 |

2024 year-end chart performance for Purple Rain
| Chart (2024) | Position |
|---|---|
| US Soundtrack Albums (Billboard) | 10 |

2025 year-end chart performance for Purple Rain
| Chart (2025) | Position |
|---|---|
| US Soundtrack Albums (Billboard) | 12 |

== Certifications and sales ==
Certifications for Purple Rain
| Region | Certification | Certified units/sales |
|---|---|---|
| Australia (ARIA) | 3× Platinum | 210,000^{^} |
| Austria (IFPI Austria) | Gold | 25,000^{*} |
| Canada (Music Canada) | 6× Platinum | 600,000^{^} |
| Denmark (IFPI Danmark) | Gold | 10,000^{‡} |
| France (SNEP) | Platinum | 300,000^{*} |
| Germany (BVMI) | 3× Gold | 750,000^{^} |
| Italy | — | 60,000 |
| Italy (FIMI) sales + streams since 2009 | Gold | 25,000^{‡} |
| Japan | — | 197,000 |
| Netherlands (NVPI) | Platinum | 100,000^{^} |
| New Zealand (RMNZ) | 5× Platinum | 75,000^{^} |
| Spain (Promusicae) | Gold | 50,000^{^} |
| Switzerland (IFPI Switzerland) | Platinum | 50,000^{^} |
| United Kingdom (BPI) | 2× Platinum | 600,000^{^} |
| United States (RIAA) | 13× Platinum | 13,000,000^{^} |
Summaries
| Worldwide sales in 2016 | — | 700,000 |
| Worldwide | — | 25,000,000 |
^{*} Sales figures based on certification alone.^{^} Shipments figures based on certification alone.^{‡} Sales+streaming figures based on certification alone.

== See also ==
- List of 1980s albums considered the best
- List of Billboard 200 number-one albums of 1984
- List of Billboard 200 number-one albums of 1985
- List of best-selling albums
- List of best-selling albums in the United States
- List of fastest-selling albums
