= I Would Die 4 U =

1984 single by Prince

- US 7" single

Single by Prince and the Revolution

from the album Purple Rain
- B-side: "Another Lonely Christmas"; "Free" (UK 12")
- Released: November 28, 1984
- Recorded: First Avenue, Minneapolis, August 3, 1983 (live recording); Sunset Sound, Los Angeles, late August–early September, 1983 (overdubs)
- Genre: Synth-rock; synth-pop
- Length: 2:51 (album version); 2:57 (single version); 10:15 (12-inch version)
- Label: Warner Bros.
- Songwriter: Prince
- Producer: Prince

Prince singles chronology
"Purple Rain" (1984)	"I Would Die 4 U" (1984)	"Take Me with U" (1985)

Purple Rain singles chronology
Jungle Love (1984)	I Would Die 4 U (1984)	The Bird (1984)

"I Would Die 4 U" is a song by Prince and the Revolution, the fourth single in the US from his 1984 album, Purple Rain. The up-tempo dance song was a top 10 hit—the final one from the album—in the US, reaching number 8 on the Billboard Hot 100.

== Reception ==
Cash Box called the song "a practice in restrained ecstasy" in which "Prince delivers one of his finest and most passionate...vocal performances." Billboard called it "electrifying", saying that "the nervous excitement zaps like a high-tension wire."

"I Would Die 4 U" is often played in sequence with "Baby I'm a Star", the track following it, on Purple Rain. As of April 30, 2016, it had sold 561,772 copies in the United States.

== "Another Lonely Christmas" ==
The B-side, "Another Lonely Christmas", is a melancholy account of a man mourning his lover, who had died from pneumonia on a previous Christmas Day. Prince recorded "Another Lonely Christmas" in February 1984. Despite the fact that, during that period of his life, Prince was very solitary, he insisted that "Another Lonely Christmas" was a fictional story. The song has been compared to "Sometimes It Snows in April", from the 1986 album Parade. He performed "Another Lonely Christmas" live only one time, on the day after Christmas, December 26, 1984, at the St. Paul Civic Center in Minnesota.

== Alternate versions ==
The extended version of "I Would Die 4 U" is actually a rehearsal jam on the song with the Revolution and musicians from Sheila E.'s band, Eddie M (on sax) and Miko Weaver (guitar), along with Sheila E. herself recorded some time before the Purple Rain Tour. The jam features some overdubbing and fades at the end; a longer version, nearly 31 minutes long, was never released officially, but has been bootlegged. The extended mix was also used as the B-side of the 1989 "Erotic City" single (the artwork of which features the same image of Prince that was used for this single's cover).

The B-side of the UK 12" single release includes "Another Lonely Christmas" as well as the 1999 track "Free".

== Track listings ==
7": Paisley Park / 7-29121 (US)

1. "I Would Die 4 U" (single version) – 2:57
2. "Another Lonely Christmas" – 4:51

12": Paisley Park / 9 20291-0 (US)

1. "I Would Die 4 U" (extended version) – 10:15
2. "Another Lonely Christmas" (extended version) – 6:47

12": Warner Bros. / W9121T (UK)

1. "I Would Die 4 U" (single version) – 2:57
2. "Another Lonely Christmas" – 4:51
3. "Free" – 5:00

== Personnel ==
Credits adapted from Duane Tudahl, Benoît Clerc, and Guitarcloud.

- Prince – lead and backing vocals, electric guitar, piano, synthesizers
- Wendy Melvoin – electric guitar, backing vocals
- Lisa Coleman – synthesizers, backing vocals
- Matt Fink – synthesizers, Memorymoog, Linn LM-1
- Brown Mark – bass guitar
- Bobby Z. – Linn LM-1, Pearl SY-1 Syncussion, cymbals

== Charts ==
=== Weekly charts ===
Weekly chart performance for "I Would Die 4 U"
Chart (1984–1985)	Peak position
Belgium (Ultratop 50 Flanders)	11
Canadian Singles Chart	12
Netherlands (Dutch Top 40)	3
Netherlands (Single Top 100)	7
UK Singles (Official Charts)	58
US Billboard Hot 100	8
US Hot R&B/Hip-Hop Songs (Billboard)	11
US Dance Club Songs (Billboard)	50

2016 weekly chart performance for "I Would Die 4 U"
Chart (2016)	Peak position
France (SNEP)	123

=== Year-end charts ===
Year-end chart performance for "I Would Die 4 U"
Chart (1985)	Position
Netherlands (Dutch Top 40)	55
Netherlands (Single Top 100)	85

== Cover versions ==
- French-British musician Space Cowboy released his version in 2002; it peaked at number 55 on the UK Singles Chart. It was his first official single released under the name Space Cowboy.
- English singer-songwriter Holly Humberstone covered the song in 2022.
