= The Beautiful Ones =

Song by Prince

from the album Purple Rain
- Released: June 25, 1984
- Recorded: September 20, 1983
- Studio: Sunset Sound (Los Angeles, California)
- Genre: Soul; new age
- Length: 5:13
- Label: Warner Bros.
- Songwriter: Prince
- Producer: Prince

Audio
- "The Beautiful Ones" (2015 remaster) by Prince on YouTube

"The Beautiful Ones" is the third track on Prince and the Revolution's soundtrack album Purple Rain. It was one of three songs produced, arranged, composed, and performed by Prince, the other two being "When Doves Cry" and "Darling Nikki". The song was recorded at Sunset Sound Recorders in Los Angeles by Peggy Mac and David Leonard on September 20, 1983. The song replaced "Electric Intercourse" on the Purple Rain album.

The version on the Purple Rain album is slightly cut; a longer version of the song exists. Mariah Carey covered the song, as a duet with R&B group Dru Hill, for her sixth studio album Butterfly. In 2011, American singer Beyoncé performed a cover of the song during her historic headlining 2011 Glastonbury Festival Performance.

== Content ==
In the film, The Kid (Prince) sings the song directly from the stage to Apollonia, who is sitting with his rival Morris Day. The song is a direct and urgent appeal to Apollonia to choose Prince as her lover—and it is a direct challenge to Day. Ultimately, as the song ends and Prince lies, apparently spent, on the floor of the stage, Apollonia leaves in tears. (Later, she returns to the Kid when he is unlocking his motorcycle to leave the club.)

== Origin ==
"The Beautiful Ones" was originally said to be written for Susannah Melvoin (Revolution band member Wendy's twin sister) to woo her away from her then-boyfriend. The timeline fits, as Susannah was seeing someone else when she met Prince in May 1983. The notion that the song was written for her was also confirmed by engineer Susan Rogers. Melvoin has admitted that she isn't completely sure about the genesis of the song: "I can't say that the song was exactly our story, but he wrote it during that time," Melvoin says in Let's Go Crazy: Prince and the Making of Purple Rain. "He wasn't always specifically writing about what he was going through, because he also had to be consistent with the Purple Rain storyline, but he was drawing from things that had happened in his life."

Only much later, during a 2015 interview with Ebony magazine, did Prince finally identify who the beautiful one really was: Denise Matthews aka Vanity, his one-time protégé and girlfriend. Both elements, the actual and the imagined, are at play in this layered triumph. "I was talking to somebody about 'The Beautiful Ones.' They were speculating as to who I was singing about – but they were completely wrong," Prince said. "If they look at it, it’s very obvious. 'Do you want him or do you want me,' that was written for that scene in Purple Rain specifically, where Morris would be sitting with [Apollonia] and there’d be this back and forth. And also, 'The beautiful ones you always seem to lose,' Vanity had just quit the movie." The pair had met in 1980, with Prince bestowing the stage name Vanity, as he felt looking at her was like looking at the female version of himself. She would go on to inspire some of his biggest early hits. He also created a band around her, Vanity 6, for which he wrote songs and produced.

== Personnel ==
Credits sourced from Duane Tudahl, Benoît Clerc and Guitarcloud

- Prince – lead and backing vocals, Oberheim OB-SX, Oberheim OB-8, Yamaha CP-80 electric grand piano, electric guitar, bass guitar, Linn LM-1, cymbals
