= Take Me with U =

- Japan 7" single

Single by Prince and the Revolution

from the album Purple Rain
- A-side: "Let's Go Crazy" (double A-side in UK)
- B-side: "Baby I'm a Star"
- Released: January 25, 1985
- Recorded: January 27, 1984
- Studio: Sunset Sound, Los Angeles
- Genre: Psychedelic rock; psychedelic pop; psychedelic soul
- Length: 3:52 (album/12" version); 3:39 (7" edit)
- Label: Warner Bros.
- Songwriter: Prince
- Producer: Prince

Prince singles chronology
"I Would Die 4 U" (1984)	"Take Me with U" (1985)	"Raspberry Beret" (1985)

Purple Rain singles chronology
The Bird (1984)	Take Me With U (1985)	Modernaire (2008)

"Take Me with U" is a song by Prince and the Revolution, and the final US single released from their album, Purple Rain (1984).

== Background ==
The song is sung as a duet with Apollonia Kotero. It was originally intended to be performed by Vanity. Shortly before filming began on the movie Purple Rain, Vanity famously chose to quit participation in the film altogether when she was offered what appeared to be a lucrative contract with Motown Records exec Berry Gordy and began filming The Last Dragon. (An early demo of the song exists with her vocals and has circulated on bootleg recordings by collectors.) She ceased her romantic relationship with Prince. The song was then intended for the Apollonia 6 album to coincide with the film, but was pulled for the Purple Rain soundtrack. As a result of this addition, Prince made cuts to the suite-like original "Computer Blue", which circulates among collectors in an extended version (a portion of this second section of "Computer Blue" can be heard in the film Purple Rain as Prince walks in on the men of The Revolution rehearsing). The original version of the song was about a minute longer.

== Reception ==
Cash Box said that the song has "some beautiful melodies and some well-placed string sections which are proof of Prince’s varied talents." (The string arrangement itself was by both Prince and band member Lisa Coleman.)

== Chart performance ==
The single was released with an edit of album track "Baby I'm a Star" as its B-side. In the US, it peaked at number 40 on the Hot Black Singles chart and number 25 on the Billboard Hot 100 the weeks of March 23 and 30, 1985. In the UK, the song was issued as a double A-side single, coupled with "Let's Go Crazy", reaching number 7 in March 1985.

== Track listing ==
=== 7": Warner Bros. / 7-29079 (US) ===
1. "Take Me with U" (edit) – 3:42
2. "Baby I'm a Star" (edit) – 2:55

== Personnel ==
Credits adapted from Duane Tudahl, Benoît Clerc, Guitarcloud, Michael Aubrecht, and the album's liner notes.

- Prince – lead and backing vocals, Oberheim OB-8 and Oberheim OB-Xa synthesizers, acoustic guitar, bass guitar, Simmons SDSV, LinnDrum, string arrangement
- Apollonia – co-lead and backing vocals
- Jill Jones – co-lead and backing vocals
- Lisa Coleman – co-lead and backing vocals, string arrangement, string conductor
- Wendy Melvoin – string conductor
- David Coleman – cello, finger cymbals
- Novi Novog – violin

== Charts ==
Chart performance for "Take Me with U"
Chart (1985)	Peak position
Luxembourg (Radio Luxembourg) with "Let's Go Crazy"	5
UK Singles (Official Charts) with "Let's Go Crazy"	7
US Billboard Hot 100	25
US Hot R&B/Hip-Hop Songs (Billboard)	40
