= International Lover =

Song by Prince

from the album 1999
- Language: English
- Published: October 27, 1982
- Recorded: January 14, 1982
- Studio: Sunset Sound Recorders
- Genre: R&B; soul
- Length: 6:37
- Label: Warner Bros.
- Songwriter: Prince
- Producer: Prince

"International Lover" is a song by American musician Prince from the album 1999. It was the song for which he received his first Grammy Award nomination.

== Details ==
"International Lover" was the final song on the 1999 double album. "International Lover" is associated with Prince as a descriptor of his personage.

"International Lover" is one of the earliest examples of Prince performing a song for a lover who is the subject of the song. The song's lyrics are seductive and considered to be metaphorical with sex being compared to air travel and Prince serving as the captain. Don Kaplan of the Daily News describes the song as "a sexy number where he invites a woman to board a plane dubbed the Seduction 747, which is 'fully-equipped with anything your body desires.'"

It is considered to be one of the songs that vaulted him to stardom and a good example of his vocal range from bass to falsetto. The song is also considered to be one of the best examples of Prince's screaming vocal machinations. Prince received his first Grammy Award nomination (at the 26th Annual Grammy Awards in the Best R&B Vocal Performance, Male category) for "International Lover".

== Personnel ==
Credits sourced from Benoît Clerc, Guitarcloud, and Prince Vault. (Note: Prince is generally credited for playing drums, but International Lover's final take was recorded the same day as the song's first take and The Walk by The Time, which both feature Morris Day behind the kit.)

- Prince – lead and backing vocals, piano, Oberheim OB-X, electric guitar, bass guitar, fingersnaps; possible drums
- Morris Day – drums
