= Darling Nikki =

1984 song by Prince

Song by Prince

from the album Purple Rain
- Released: June 25, 1984
- Recorded: May 27, 1983
- Studio: Kiowa Trail Home Studio (Chanhassen, Minnesota)
- Genre: Hard rock
- Length: 4:14
- Label: Warner Bros.
- Songwriter: Prince
- Producer: Prince

"Darling Nikki" is a song produced, arranged, composed, and performed by American musician Prince, originally released on his sixth studio album Purple Rain (1984). Though the song was not released as a single, it gained wide notoriety in 1985 after Tipper Gore pointed out its sexual lyrics—in particular an explicit reference to female masturbation—and was partly responsible for the creation of the Parental Advisory sticker. The song tells the story of a "sex fiend" named Nikki who seduces the singer.

In the film Purple Rain, for which the album serves as the soundtrack, the song is directed toward Apollonia Kotero's character when she decides to work with Prince's character's rival (played by Morris Day). Compared with the slick production of the other songs on the album, "Darling Nikki" was deliberately engineered to have a raw and live feel. Near the end of the song, the music stops into the sound of rain and wind. There is singing, but it is played in reverse. Played forward, the vocals are Prince singing:

Hello, how are you?
I'm fine, 'cause I know that the Lord is coming soon
Coming, coming soon.

During the Purple Rain Tour performances of "Darling Nikki", the recording at the end was played forward. This can be heard in the 1985 live video Prince and the Revolution: Live.

== Parental Advisory sticker ==
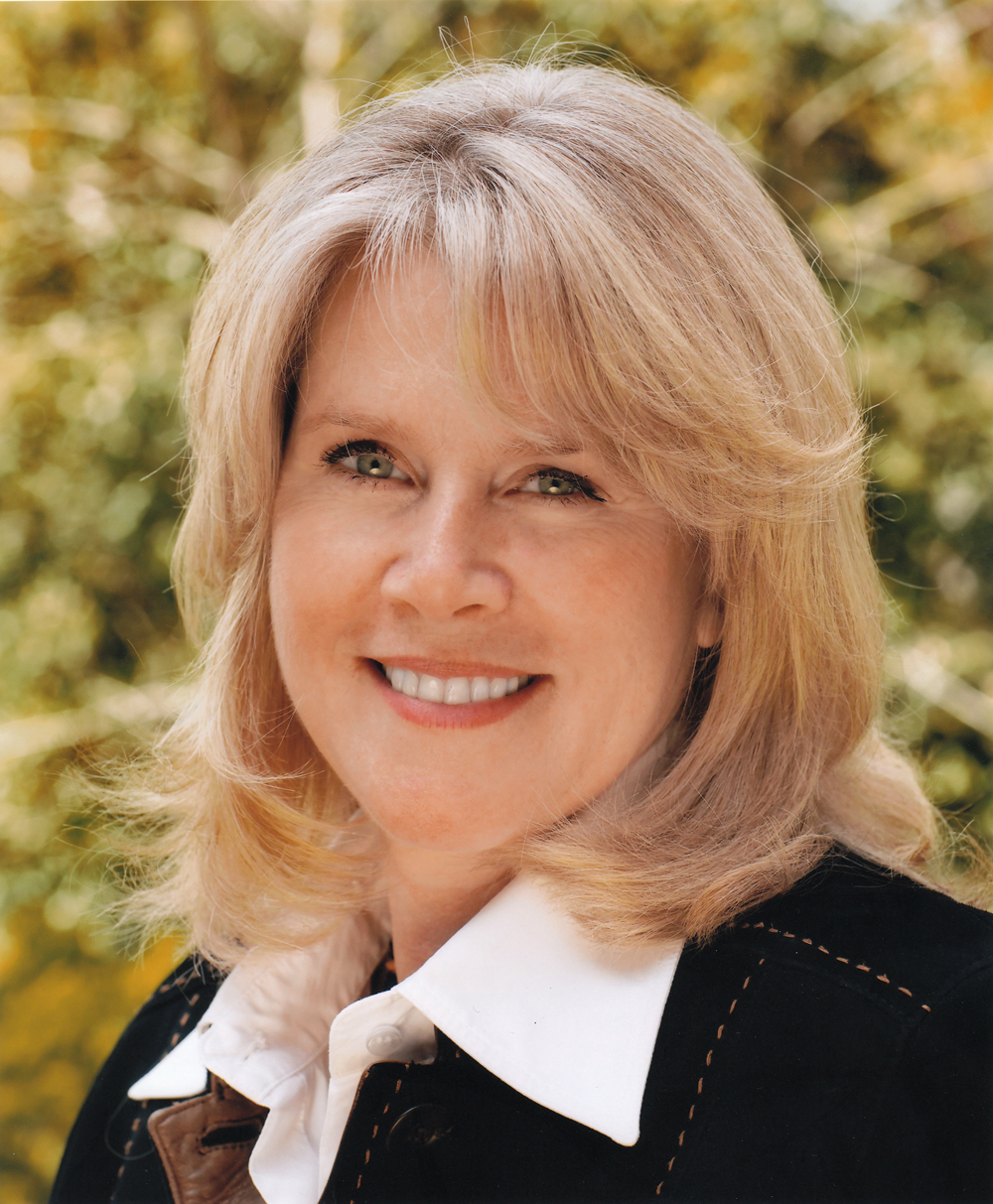
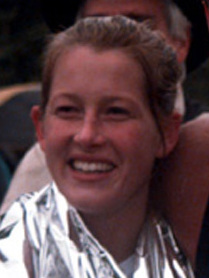
Tipper Gore (left) founded the PMRC after catching her then-eleven-year-old daughter Karenna (right) listening to "Darling Nikki".

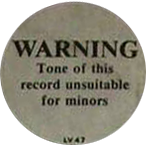
An earlier version of the Parental Advisory sticker that was later used in re-issues of Purple Rain.

American social issues advocate Tipper Gore reportedly co-founded the Parents Music Resource Center (PMRC) in 1985 because she witnessed her daughter Karenna, who was 11 years old at the time, listening to "Darling Nikki". As examples of what they meant, PMRC published a list of 15 popular "filthy" songs, with "Darling Nikki" first. The PMRC would later become known for leading to the use of the well-known Parental Advisory sticker on album covers.

== Personnel ==
Credits sourced from Duane Tudahl, Benoît Clerc, and Guitarcloud

- Prince – lead and backing vocals, Oberheim OB-8, Oberheim OB-Xa, electric guitars, bass guitar, drums, Linn LM-1, Simmons SDSV

== Charts ==
Chart performance for "Darling Nikki"
Chart (2016)	Peak position
US Digital Song Sales (Billboard)	26
US Hot Rock & Alternative Songs (Billboard)	9
