= Let's Go Crazy =

1984 single by Prince and The Revolution

- US 7" single

Single by Prince and the Revolution

from the album Purple Rain
- B-side: "Erotic City"; "Take Me with U" (UK)
- Released: July 18, 1984
- Recorded: August 7, 1983
- Studio: The Warehouse, St. Louis Park
- Genre: Hard rock; funk rock; glam rock; garage rock
- Length: 3:50 (7"/video version); 4:39 (album version); 7:35 (12"/movie version)
- Label: Warner Bros.
- Songwriter: Prince
- Producers: Prince and the Revolution

Prince singles chronology
"When Doves Cry" (1984)	"Let's Go Crazy" (1984)	"Purple Rain" (1984)

Purple Rain singles chronology
When Doves Cry (1984)	Let's Go Crazy (1984)	Sex Shooter (1984)

Music video
- "Let's Go Crazy" on YouTube

"Let's Go Crazy" is a 1984 song by Prince and The Revolution, from the album Purple Rain. It is the opening track on both the album and the film Purple Rain. "Let's Go Crazy" was one of Prince's most popular songs, and was a staple for concert performances, often segueing into other hits. When released as a single, the song became Prince's second number-one hit on the Billboard Hot 100, and also topped the two component charts, the Hot R&B/Hip-Hop Songs and Hot Dance Club Play charts, as well as becoming a UK Top 10 hit. The B-side was the lyrically controversial "Erotic City". In the UK, the song was released as a double A-side with "Take Me with U".

Common to much of Prince's writing, the song is thought to be exhortation to follow Christian ethics, with the "De-elevator" of the lyrics being a metaphor for the Devil. The extended "Special Dance Mix" of the song was performed in a slightly edited version in the film Purple Rain. It contains a longer instrumental section in the middle that includes a chugging guitar riff, an atonal piano solo and some muddled samples of the spoken word intro. This version was originally going to be used on the album but when "Take Me With U" was added to the track list, it was edited down to its current length.

Cash Box called the song "one of the finest fusions of jump rock and synth pump."

Following Prince's death, the song re-charted on the Billboard Hot 100 singles chart at number 39 and rose to number 25 by the week of May 14, 2016. As of April 30, 2016, it has sold 964,403 digital copies in the United States.

In 2013, British rock band The Darkness performed the song at the 44th Annual Rock Music Awards.

== Musical style ==
The song was also notable for opening with a funeral-like organ solo with Prince giving the "eulogy" for "this thing called life." The introduction's words are overlapped with each other on the single version. The song climaxes with a distinctive drum machine pattern and then features a heavy guitar lead, electronic drums, bass and whirring synthesizers and a climatic drum outro. The song's percussion was programmed with a Linn LM-1 drum machine, an instrument frequently used in many of Prince's songs. The song is also known for its two guitar solos both performed by Prince.

== Track listing ==
7" Warner Bros. / 7-29216 (US)

1. "Let's Go Crazy" (edit) – 3:46
2. "Erotic City" (edit) – 3:53

7" Warner Bros. / W2000 (UK)

1. "Let's Go Crazy" (edit) – 3:46
2. "Take Me with U" – 3:51

12" Warner Bros. / 0-20246 (US)

1. "Let's Go Crazy" (Special Dance Mix) – 7:35
2. "Erotic City ("make love not war Erotic City come alive")" – 7:24

12" Warner Bros. / W2000T (UK)

1. "Let's Go Crazy" (Special Dance Mix) – 7:35
2. "Take Me with U" – 3:51
3. "Erotic City ("make love not war Erotic City come alive")" – 7:24

== Personnel ==
Credits are sourced from Duane Tudahl, Benoît Clerc, Guitarcloud and Mix.

- Prince – lead and backing vocals, lead guitar, piano (Special Dance Mix), tambourine, drum programming
- Wendy Melvoin – rhythm guitar, backing vocals
- Lisa Coleman – Oberheim OB-SX, backing vocals
- Doctor Fink – Oberheim OB-SX, backing vocals
- Brown Mark – bass, backing vocals
- Bobby Z. – Linn LM-1, Simmons SDSV, Pearl SY-1 Syncussion, cymbals

== Charts ==
=== Weekly charts ===
1984–1985 weekly chart performance for "Let's Go Crazy"
Chart (1984–1985)	Peak position
Australia (Kent Music Report)	10
Belgium (Ultratop 50 Flanders)	11
Canada Top Singles (RPM)	2
Canada Retail Singles (The Record)	4
France (SNEP)	50
Luxembourg (Radio Luxembourg) with "Take Me with U"	5
Netherlands (Dutch Top 40)	18
Netherlands (Single Top 100)	11
New Zealand (Recorded Music NZ)	13
UK Singles (Official Charts) with "Take Me with U"	7
US Billboard Hot 100	1
US Dance Club Songs (Billboard)	1
US Hot Black Singles (Billboard)	1
US Mainstream Rock Airplay (Billboard)	19

2016 weekly chart performance for "Let's Go Crazy"
Chart (2016)	Peak position
US Hot Rock & Alternative Songs (Billboard)	5

=== Year-end charts ===
1984 year-end chart performance for "Let's Go Crazy"
Chart (1984)	Position
Canada Top Singles (RPM)	26
US Top Pop Singles (Billboard)	21

2016 year-end chart performance for "Let's Go Crazy"
Chart (2016)	Position
US Hot Rock Songs (Billboard)	37

== Certifications and sales ==
Certifications and sales for "Let's Go Crazy"
Region	Certification	Certified units/sales
United Kingdom (BPI)	Silver	200,000^{‡}
United States (RIAA) 1984 sales	Gold	1,000,000^{^}
United States digital sales	—	964,403
^{^} Shipments figures based on certification alone.^{‡} Sales+streaming figures based on certification alone.

== Lenz v. Universal ==
In 2007, Stephanie Lenz, a writer and editor from Gallitzin, Pennsylvania made a home video of her 13-month-old son dancing to "Let's Go Crazy" and posted a 29-second video on the video-sharing site YouTube. Four months after the video was originally uploaded, Universal Music Group, which owned the copyrights to the song, ordered YouTube to remove the video enforcing the Digital Millennium Copyright Act. Lenz notified YouTube immediately that her video was within the scope of fair use, and demanded that it be restored. YouTube complied after six weeks—not two weeks, as required by the Digital Millennium Copyright Act—to see whether Universal planned to sue Lenz for infringement. Lenz then sued Universal Music in California for her legal costs, claiming the music company had acted in bad faith by ordering removal of a video that represented fair use of the song.

Later in August 2008, U.S. District Judge Jeremy Fogel, of San Jose, California, ruled that copyright holders cannot order a deletion of an online file without determining whether that posting reflected "fair use" of the copyrighted material. In 2015 the court affirmed the holding that Universal was required to consider fair use before sending its initial takedown request.

== See also ==
- List of Billboard Hot 100 number-one singles of 1984
