= Girls & Boys (Prince song) =

- UK 12-inch single

Single by Prince and the Revolution

from the album Parade
- B-side: "Under the Cherry Moon"; "Erotic City" (UK 12-inch); "She's Always in My Hair" (UK double 7-inch single); "17 Days" (UK double 7-inch single)
- Released: August 4, 1986
- Recorded: July 8, 1985
- Studio: Washington Avenue Warehouse (Minneapolis)
- Genre: Funk
- Length: 3:27 (7-inch edit); 5:30 (album/12-inch version)
- Label: Paisley Park; Warner Bros.
- Songwriter: Prince
- Producer: Prince

Prince singles chronology
"Anotherloverholenyohead" (1986)	"Girls & Boys" (1986)	"Sign o' the Times" (1987)

"Girls & Boys" is a 1986 song by American musician Prince and the Revolution, from his eighth studio album, Parade (1986), the soundtrack to the film Under the Cherry Moon. The song was released as a single in the UK, and as the B-side to "Anotherloverholenyohead" in the US.

Following the smash success of its predecessor "Kiss", "Girls & Boys" peaked at number 11 in the UK, but was not released as a single in the United States. Prince's former drummer, Bobby Z. later commented that the song may have helped the entire album and film achieve bigger success, saying "second singles sometimes weren't right... 'Kiss' was a complete smash and set the album up huge. In my opinion it should then have been 'Girls & Boys', not 'Mountains'". The music video for the single consisted of clips from the film and separately shot footage of the Revolution, including Prince's then-fiancee Susannah Melvoin.

"Girls & Boys" is a funk offering featuring both live drumming (on an electronic drum) as well as the drum machine Linn LM-1. The guitar hook is a peculiar duck-like sound. This is the first official Prince single to include the saxophone contributions of Eric Leeds. The lyrics speak of characters similar to Christopher and Mary from Under the Cherry Moon, although their actions are not seen in the film. The song includes a seduction spoken by Marie France in French, as well as an early attempt by Prince to deliver a short rap. Background vocals are Wendy & Lisa, Susannah Melvoin and Sheila E.

The B-side was the LP version of "Under the Cherry Moon". The 12-inch single also included the 1984 track "Erotic City", which originally backed "Let's Go Crazy". In addition, a special double 7-inch single was released containing "Girls & Boys", "She's Always in My Hair" (which originally backed "Paisley Park"), "Under the Cherry Moon", and "17 Days", which originally backed "When Doves Cry".

In March 2006, British actress Kristin Scott Thomas, one of the stars of Under the Cherry Moon, nominated "Girls and Boys" as one of her eight favourite Desert Island Discs.

"Girls and Boys" was covered by jazz/funk bassist Marcus Miller on his 2005 album Silver Rain, featuring singer Macy Gray.

== Track listing ==
- 7-inch vinyl / 7-inch vinyl picture disc
1. "Girls & Boys" (edit) – 3:27
2. "Under the Cherry Moon" – 2:57
- 2× 7-inch vinyl
1. "Girls & Boys" (edit) – 3:27
2. "Under the Cherry Moon" – 2:57
3. "She's Always in My Hair" – 3:27
4. "17 Days" – 3:52
- 12-inch vinyl
1. "Girls & Boys" (LP version) – 5:30
2. "Under the Cherry Moon" – 2:57
3. "Erotic City (Make Love Not War Erotic City Come Alive)" – 7:24

== Personnel ==
Credits from Duane Tudahl, Benoît Clerc, and Guitarcloud

- Prince – lead and backing vocals, Roland G-707 electric guitar, Roland GR-700 guitar synthesizer, synthesizers, finger cymbals
- Lisa Coleman – synthesizers, backing vocals
- Wendy Melvoin – electric guitar, backing vocals
- Dr. Fink – synthesizers
- Brown Mark – bass guitar
- Bobby Z. – Simmons SDSV, Linn LM-1
- Sheila E. – backing vocals
- Eric Leeds – baritone saxophone
- Atlanta Bliss – trumpet
- Susannah Melvoin – backing vocals
- Marie-France Drouin – vocals in French
- Clare Fischer – orchestral arrangements

== Charts ==
Weekly chart performance for "Girls & Boys"
Chart (1986)	Peak position
Belgium (Ultratop 50 Flanders)	10
Finland (Suomen virallinen lista)	10
France (SNEP)	38
Luxembourg (Radio Luxembourg)	5
Netherlands (Dutch Top 40)	29
Netherlands (Single Top 100)	12
UK Singles (OCC)	11
West Germany (GfK)	27
