= Wendy and Lisa (album) =

Studio album by Wendy & Lisa
- Released: August 24, 1987
- Recorded: 1987
- Studio: Ocean Way Recording, Los Angeles, California
- Genre: Psychedelic rock; psychedelic soul; neo-psychedelia
- Length: 50:36
- Label: Columbia (US); Virgin (UK)
- Producer: Wendy & Lisa; Bobby Z.

Wendy & Lisa chronology
Wendy and Lisa (1987)	Fruit at the Bottom (1989)

Alternative cover
- European cover

Professional ratings
Review scores
Source	Rating
AllMusic	4/5 stars

Wendy and Lisa is the 1987 debut album by American pop duo Wendy & Lisa, formerly of Prince's band, the Revolution.

== Background ==
Five of the eleven tracks on the album were co-written by Bobby Z., Wendy and Lisa's former colleague from the Revolution, who also co-produced the album with the duo. Wendy's twin sister, Susannah Melvoin (an extended Revolution member herself) co-wrote the track "Honeymoon Express".

The album, released in the United States on August 24, 1987, peaked at No. 88 in the US and at No. 84 in the UK. The UK and European release features different cover artwork to the US release.

The album contains several singles, including "Honeymoon Express" and "Waterfall" (which was re-released two years later as "Waterfall '89"). In the US, the only single to hit the Billboard Hot 100 was "Waterfall" which peaked at No. 56 in 1987. "Sideshow" was also released as a single in the UK and Europe. The track "The Life" was re-recorded in the 1990s when it was retitled as "This Is the Life" and produced by Trevor Horn. This version was included on the number-one hit soundtrack album of the film Dangerous Minds (1995) and released as a single in Europe.

The album was reissued in the US in 2006 by Wounded Bird Records, featuring four bonus tracks including "To Trip Is to Fall", which was originally a 12" B-side track. The album was reissued in the UK in 2013 by Cherry Pop Records also featuring four bonus tracks, though two of the tracks differ from the US reissue.

== Critical reception ==
Upon release columnist of pan-European magazine Music & Media highlighted "Sideshow", "Stay" and instrumental "White" and concluded that although the album's compositions "remain heavily influenced by Prince," the album "proves that not only can they stand on their own two feet, but also how important they are to Prince's Revolution."

== Track listing ==
All tracks are written by Wendy Melvoin and Lisa Coleman; except where indicated

Side one
No.	Title	Writer(s)	Length
1.	"Honeymoon Express"	W. Melvoin; Coleman; Susannah Melvoin; Bobby Z.	3:46
2.	"Sideshow"	W. Melvoin; Coleman; Z.	4:41
3.	"Waterfall"	W. Melvoin; Coleman; Z.	5:03
4.	"Stay"		4:27
5.	"White"		5:37

Side two
No.	Title	Writer(s)	Length
6.	"Blues Away"	W. Melvoin; Coleman; Z.	4:58
7.	"Song About"		4:29
8.	"Chance to Grow"	W. Melvoin; Coleman; Z.	3:31
9.	"The Life"		4:07
10.	"Everything But You"		5:03
11.	"Light"		4:54
Total length:			50:36

2006 Wounded Bird reissue bonus tracks
No.	Title	Writer(s)	Length
12.	"Waterfall" (single version)	W. Melvoin; Coleman; Z.	4:16
13.	"Honeymoon Express" (12" version)	W. Melvoin; Coleman; S. Melvoin; Z.	4:56
14.	"Sideshow" (Dance Mix)	W. Melvoin; Coleman; Z.	8:56
15.	"To Trip Is to Fall" (full-length version)	W. Melvoin; Coleman; Kris Bell	6:54

2013 Cherry Pop reissue bonus tracks
No.	Title	Writer(s)	Length
12.	"Honeymoon Express" (12" version)	W. Melvoin; Coleman; S. Melvoin; Z.	4:56
13.	"Sideshow" (extended version)	W. Melvoin; Coleman; Z.	6:31
14.	"Waterfall '89" (Alice & Sundial Seven)	W. Melvoin; Coleman; Z.	4:17
15.	"Waterfall" (Psychedelic Teepee Twelve)	W. Melvoin; Coleman, Z.	7:16

== Personnel ==
Credits are adapted from the Wendy and Lisa liner notes.

Wendy & Lisa

- Wendy Melvoin – lead and background vocals, guitar, bass, drums and percussion, organ
- Lisa Coleman – lead and background vocals, keyboards, piano, synth

Additional musicians

- Jonathan Melvoin – drums and percussion
- Tom Scott – soprano saxophone, lyricon
- Cole Ynda – vocals
- Carla Azar – drums and percussion
- Susannah Melvoin – vocals
- David Coleman – percussion
- Gary Coleman – congas

== Charts ==
Chart performance for Wendy and Lisa
Chart (1987)	Peak position
Dutch Albums (Album Top 100)	54
UK Albums (OCC)	84
US Billboard 200	88
