= Around the World in a Day (song) =

Song by Prince and The Revolution

from the album Around the World in a Day
- Released: April 22, 1985
- Recorded: August 16, 1984
- Studio: Flying Cloud Drive Warehouse
- Genre: Psychedelic soul; synth-pop; psychedelia
- Length: 3:25
- Label: Paisley Park; Warner Bros.
- Songwriters: Prince; John L. Nelson; David Coleman
- Producer: Prince

"Around the World in a Day" is a song performed by Prince and the Revolution and is the opening track of the album of the same name. The track represents a completely different direction that Prince wanted to go after the massively successful Purple Rain album and film of the same name.

== Background ==
In 1984, roughly before the release of Purple Rain, Prince was looking to go in a different direction, and was already starting to record new material for another album as he was preparing the Revolution to go on the Purple Rain Tour. In June of 1984, Prince decided to give David Coleman, brother of Revolution keyboardist Lisa Coleman, roughly two days of studio time at Sunset Sound Recorders as a birthday present. David and his friend Jonathan Melvoin, brother of Revolution guitarist Wendy Melvoin, would then record a demo for the track, which was in a skeletal form that only consisted of the song's chorus and tag. David Coleman would later remark on the inspiration behind the track:

I wrote the song based on a close friend of mine, but to me she was a high school sweetheart, a young girl from Beirut, Lebanon, named Christine Maalouf.

Once Prince had heard this demo, he got very excited and decided he had to include it on his next album. After rewriting the lyrics and creating the verses, Prince would record the track in August of 1984 with David, Jonathan, and select members of the Revolution, compiling together a psychedelic message about love being spread all around the world. Originally, the track was slightly funky, but cuts were made to guitar and bass guitar parts for a more minimalist approach. After the track had finished recording, Prince felt inspired to create his entire album in a different way than he had done so before, determining the direction he wanted to go after Purple Rain. Susan Rogers, one of Prince's engineers on the album, explained the song's significance in an interview with the Red Bull Music Academy:

That was an anchor song, it was a seed that was an important song. When I heard that song and heard how he was talking and how he was writing, I knew this is the approach, this is the world view.

== Personnel ==
Information taken from Duane Tudahl, Benoît Clerc, Guitarcloud, and the Prince Vault website.

- Prince – lead and backing vocals, Yamaha DX7, electric guitar, Linn LM-1
- David Coleman – oud, finger cymbals, darbuka, cello, backing vocals
- Wendy Melvoin – acoustic guitar, backing vocals
- Bobby Z. – Linn LM-1, backing vocals
- Jonathan Melvoin – tambourine, backing vocals
- Lisa Coleman – backing vocals
- Dr. Fink – backing vocals
- Susannah Melvoin – backing vocals
