= Raspberry Beret =

1985 single by Prince and the Revolution

Single by Prince and the Revolution

from the album Around the World in a Day
- B-side: "She's Always in My Hair"
- Released: May 15, 1985
- Studio: Sunset Sound (Hollywood, California) (1982 version); Flying Cloud Drive Warehouse (Eden Prairie, Minnesota) (album version)
- Genre: Neo-psychedelia; psychedelic pop
- Length: 3:31 (7-inch and album version); 6:36 (new mix)
- Label: Paisley Park; Warner Bros.
- Songwriter: Prince
- Producer: Prince

Prince and the Revolution singles chronology
| "Take Me with U" (1985) | "Raspberry Beret" (1985) | "Paisley Park" (1985) |

Music video
- "Raspberry Beret" on YouTube

"Raspberry Beret" is a song written by American musician Prince and the lead single from Prince & the Revolution's 1985 album Around the World in a Day.

== Background ==
The sound of the song expanded upon previous Prince arrangements, incorporating stringed instruments, Middle Eastern finger cymbals, and a harmonica in the extended version. The song was also more in the pop vein than before, though the 12-inch single and video of the song feature a funky intro.

The lyrics concern a sexual experience with a girl who wears a raspberry-colored beret. The extended version was included on the compilation album Ultimate in 2006. While the song hit number one in Cash Box and reached number two on the Billboard Hot 100 in the US (behind "A View to a Kill" by Duran Duran), it only reached number 25 on the UK Singles Chart.

== Releases ==
The US B-side, "She's Always in My Hair", is a rock and roll number, with guitar and organs and emotional lyrics screamed toward the end. The UK B-side was "Hello", which was included on the U.S. release of "Pop Life".

== Reception ==
Cash Box described the single as "an immediately accessible track, melodic and teasingly sexual." Greg Tate of Spin said it was, "a typical Prince sex fantasy set to an arrangement reminiscent of the softer side of Abbey Road."

Following Prince's death, "Raspberry Beret" re-charted on the Billboard Hot 100 at number 33 on the chart dated the week of May 14, 2016. As of April 30, 2016, it has sold 691,421 copies in the United States.

== Music video ==
The video for the song was filmed on June 5, 1985, at S.I.R. in Los Angeles. It was directed primarily by Prince, with animation created by Colossal Pictures co-founder Drew Takahashi. It combines footage of Prince & The Revolution performing the song surrounded by dancers and overlaid with various animations. The video uses an extended version of the song with a longer intro. Guitarist Pat Smear of Germs and Foo Fighters fame, appears as one of the background dancers in the video but, according to bandmate Dave Grohl, he was nearly fired. In the 2010 book I Want My MTV, Grohl elaborates further: "everyone has to do a synchronized dance. Pat [couldn’t] dance so they sent him home[...] Prince whispers in the bodyguard's ear. The bodyguard says, "You can stay. He likes your hair." It also features the debut of actress Jackie Swanson who hands Prince his guitar.

In the same book, producer Simon Fields also recalled production on the video: "For 'Raspberry Beret', we filmed a whole video, then Prince got a Japanese animator to do a completely different video and we mashed the two up."

Prince's hair stylist Earl Jones stated in an interview that Prince damaged his hair so badly prior to the video that "the hairstyle [in the video] was literally all I could do with it."

== Live performances ==
"Raspberry Beret" remained a perennial live favourite in Prince's concerts for many years. It was initially performed in a full version for his 1986 Hit N Run World Tour whilst later performances including those on his Lovesexy Tour feature it as a stripped-down piece performed solely by Prince on piano, often as part of a medley with other songs from around the same period.

Warren Zevon performed the song on Late Night with David Letterman. Zevon had previously recorded a version as part of the Hindu Love Gods, which was released in 1990.

== Legacy ==
In 2016, Paste ranked the song number eight on their list of the 50 greatest Prince songs, and in 2022, American Songwriter ranked the song number four on their list of the 10 greatest Prince songs.

== Track listings ==
- US 7-inch single

A. "Raspberry Beret" – 3:31
B. "She's Always in My Hair" – 3:27

- US 12-inch single

A. "Raspberry Beret" (New Mix) – 6:34
B. "She's Always in My Hair" (New Mix) – 6:32

- UK 7-inch single

A. "Raspberry Beret" – 3:31
B. "Hello" – 3:23

- UK 12-inch single

A. "Raspberry Beret" (New Mix) – 6:34
B. "Hello" (Extended Remix) – 6:23

== Personnel ==
Information taken from Duane Tudahl, Benoît Clerc, Guitarcloud, and the Prince Vault website.

=== 1982 version ===
- Prince – all vocals and instruments (assumed)

=== 1984 version ===
- Prince – lead vocals, 12-string acoustic guitars, Yamaha DX7, Yamaha CP-80 electric grand piano, bass guitar, Linn LM-1, percussion
- Wendy Melvoin – background vocals
- Lisa Coleman – background vocals
- Susannah Melvoin – background vocals
- Novi Novog – violin
- David Coleman – cello
- Suzie Katayama – cello

== Charts ==
=== Weekly charts ===
1985 weekly chart performance for "Raspberry Beret"
| Chart (1985) | Peak position |
|---|---|
| Australia (Kent Music Report) | 13 |
| Belgium (Ultratop 50 Flanders) | 25 |
| Canada Retail Singles (The Record) | 8 |
| Canada Top Singles (RPM) | 10 |
| Finland (Suomen virallinen lista) | 13 |
| Ireland (IRMA) | 24 |
| Luxembourg (Radio Luxembourg) | 17 |
| Netherlands (Dutch Top 40) | 19 |
| Netherlands (Single Top 100) | 23 |
| New Zealand (Recorded Music NZ) | 2 |
| UK Singles (Official Charts) | 25 |
| US Billboard Hot 100 | 2 |
| US Dance Club Songs (Billboard) | 4 |
| US Dance Singles Sales (Billboard) | 1 |
| US Hot Black Singles (Billboard) | 3 |
| US Mainstream Rock Airplay (Billboard) | 40 |
| West Germany (GfK) | 35 |

2016 weekly chart performance for "Raspberry Beret"
| Chart (2016) | Peak position |
|---|---|
| France (SNEP) | 36 |

=== Year-end charts ===
Year-end chart performance for "Raspberry Beret"
| Chart (1985) | Rank |
|---|---|
| New Zealand (RIANZ) | 23 |
| US Billboard Hot 100 | 51 |
| US 12-inch Singles Sales (Billboard) | 38 |
| US Hot Black Singles (Billboard) | 44 |

== Certifications ==
Certifications for "Raspberry Beret"
| Region | Certification | Certified units/sales |
|---|---|---|
| New Zealand (RMNZ) | 2× Platinum | 60,000^{‡} |
| United Kingdom (BPI) | Platinum | 600,000^{‡} |
^{‡} Sales+streaming figures based on certification alone.
