= Melvoin =

Melvoin is a surname. Notable people with the surname include:

- Jeff Melvoin, American television writer, producer, and educator
- Jonathan Melvoin (1961–1996), American musician
- Mike Melvoin (1937–2012), American jazz pianist, composer, and arranger
- Susannah Melvoin (born 1964), American singer-songwriter
- Wendy Melvoin (born 1964), American guitarist and singer-songwriter
