= Paisley Park (song) =

- UK 7" single

Single by Prince and the Revolution

from the album Around the World in a Day
- B-side: "She's Always in My Hair"
- Released: May 24, 1985 (UK, Europe & Australia only)
- Recorded: September 10, 1984
- Studio: Flying Cloud Drive Warehouse, Eden Prairie, Minnesota
- Genre: Psychedelic rock; psychedelia
- Length: 4:41 (7" / album version); 6:53 (12" remix)
- Label: Paisley Park; Warner Bros.
- Songwriter: Prince
- Producer: Prince

Prince and the Revolution singles chronology
"Raspberry Beret" (1985)	"Paisley Park" (1985)	"Pop Life" (1985)

Music video
- "Paisley Park" on YouTube

"Paisley Park" is a 1985 song by Prince and the Revolution. It was the first single released in some international markets from their 1985 album, Around the World in a Day and so is also the album's last single internationally. "Paisley Park" was recorded three months after the Purple Rain album was released. Violin on the song was played by Novi Novog, and Wendy & Lisa provide backing vocals. The rest of the song was performed by Prince. The song reached the Top 40 in all of the countries it was released in. It peaked within the Top 20 in both Ireland (No. 11) and the UK (No. 18).

== "She's Always in My Hair" ==
The B-side of the single was "She's Always in My Hair", which was also on the U.S. release of "Raspberry Beret". Many copies of the 12" single were mis-pressed, featuring four tracks instead of the three mentioned on the sleeve ("She's Always In My Hair" being present twice). Basic tracking took place on December 29, 1983 in Studio 3 at Sunset Sound, with Prince playing all instruments on the track.

== Reception ==
Greg Tate of Spin said the song, "recycles the Beatles' Magical Mystery Tour for the '80s with Middle-Eastern instrumentation and escapist lyrics straight out of the Lennon–McCartney dreambook."

== Track listings ==
7" single

- A. "Paisley Park" – 4:41
- B. "She's Always in My Hair" – 3:27

12" single

- A1. "Paisley Park" – 4:41
- A2. "She's Always in My Hair" – 3:27
- B. "Paisley Park" (Remix) – 6:53

== Personnel ==
Credits sourced from Duane Tudahl, Benoît Clerc and Guitarcloud

- Prince – lead and backing vocals, electric guitars, Yamaha DX7, Linn LM-1, finger cymbals
- Wendy Melvoin – backing vocals
- Lisa Coleman – backing vocals
- Novi Novog – violin

== Charts ==
Chart performance for "Paisley Park"
Chart (1985)	Peak position
Australia (Kent Music Report)	38
Belgium (Ultratop 50 Flanders)	40
Luxembourg (Radio Luxembourg)	10
Netherlands (Single Top 100)	40
New Zealand (Recorded Music NZ)	26
UK Singles (Official Charts)	18
