= Doyle Bramhall II (album) =

Studio album by Doyle Bramhall II
- Released: September 9, 1996
- Studio: A&M Studios, Driveby Studios, Punker Prod. West, Royaltone Studios
- Genre: Blues, Blues rock, Electric blues, Pop/Rock
- Length: 53:53
- Label: Geffen
- Producer: Wendy & Lisa

Doyle Bramhall II chronology
Doyle Bramhall II (1996)	Jellycream (1999)

Professional ratings
Review scores
Source	Rating
allmusic	3/5 stars

Doyle Bramhall II is the first solo studio album by the artist of the same name. It was released September 9, 1996 to mixed reviews.

== Track listing ==
1. "Song from the Grave" (Malford Milligan, Stu Blank)
2. "Ain't Goin' Down Slow"
3. "What You Gonna Do"
4. "Close to Me"
5. "True Emotion" (Will Sexton)
6. "Bleeding from a Scratch" (Will Sexton)
7. "Time" - instrumental (Wendy Melvoin)
8. "Part II" (Craig Ross)
9. "He Stole Our Love Away"
10. "The Reason I Live" (Lisa Coleman, Will Sexton)
11. "They Get Together" (Susannah Melvoin, Wendy Melvoin)
12. "Jealous Sky" (Will Sexton)
13. "Stay Awhile" (Susannah Melvoin, Lisa Coleman, Wendy Melvoin)

== Personnel ==
- Doyle Bramhall II - Bass, Composer, Drums, Guitars (acoustic/electric), Harmonium, Piano, Producer, Tiple, Vocals
- Rev. Brady Blade - Drums
- Doyle Bramhall - Drums, Guitars, Vocals
- Lisa Coleman - Clavinet, Harmonium, Keyboards, Mellotron, Percussion, Piano, Piano, Shaker, Synthesizer, Background Vocals
- Suzie Katayama - Cello
- Abe Laboriel Jr. - Drums
- Susannah Melvoin - Background Vocals
- Wendy Melvoin - Bass, Upright Bass, Guitars (acoustic/electric), Percussion, Background Vocals
- Andrew Scheps - Drum Programming, Programming
- Sheila E. - Congas, Percussion

Technical

- Chris Bellman - Mastering
- Greg Cathcart & John Srebualus - Assistant Engineer
- Jeff Chonis - Technician
- Cappy Japngie, Husky & Rich Veltrop - Mixing Assistant
- Dave Mcnair & Carmen Rizzo - Mixing
- Mark Proct- Associate Producer
- Jeff Sheehan & Roger Sommers - Engineer
