= Fruit at the Bottom =

Studio album by Wendy & Lisa
- Released: 1989
- Recorded: 1988–1989
- Genre: Pop
- Length: 44:43
- Label: Columbia (US); Virgin (UK)
- Producer: Wendy & Lisa

Wendy & Lisa chronology
Wendy and Lisa (1987)	Fruit at the Bottom (1989)	Eroica (1990)

Singles from Fruit at the Bottom
- 1. "Are You My Baby?" Released: 1989; 2. "Lolly Lolly" Released: 1989; 3. "Satisfaction" Released: 1989

Professional ratings
Review scores
Source	Rating
AllMusic	2.5/5 stars
Record Mirror	3.5/5 stars

Fruit at the Bottom is the second studio album by American pop duo Wendy & Lisa, released in 1989 by Columbia Records. The album peaked at No. 119 on the US Billboard 200, No. 71 on the US R&B Albums chart and No. 45 on the UK Albums Chart.

== Album history ==
Wendy Melvoin's twin sister Susannah and Cole Ynda, Lisa's sister, contributed background vocal work to the record as well as touring extensively with their sisters.

Singles released from the album included "Are You My Baby" (UK No. 70) and "Lolly Lolly" (UK No. 64), the latter of which was remixed by Wendy and Lisa's former boss Prince. "Satisfaction" was also released as a single and became a Top 30 hit in the UK (No. 27).

Although the original UK album contained 10 tracks like the US release, Virgin Records in the UK reissued it later in 1989 with four bonus tracks. The album was reissued in the US in 2006 by Wounded Bird Records containing five bonus tracks, and was reissued in the UK in 2011 by Cherry Red Records containing six bonus tracks.

== Track listing ==
All songs written by Wendy Melvoin and Lisa Coleman, except where indicated

Side one

1. "Lolly Lolly" – 4:41
2. "Are You My Baby?" – 4:48
3. "Satisfaction" (Coleman, Melvoin, Jesse Johnson) – 5:12
4. "Always in My Dreams" – 4:17
5. "Everyday" – 4:06

Side two

6. "From Now On (We're One)" – 4:31
7. "Tears of Joy" – 4:39
8. "Someday I" – 3:06
9. "I Think It Was December" – 4:50
10. "Fruit at the Bottom" – 4:33

=== Bonus track editions ===
Limited edition double package (UK, 1989)

11. "Waterfall '89" (Alice & Sundial Seven) – 4:20
12. "Satisfaction" (12" Dance Mix) – 7:14
13. "Are You My Baby" (7" remix) – 4:18
14. "Lolly Lolly" (Random Dance Mix) – 7:26

Wounded Birds Records (US, 2006)

11. "Are You My Baby" (7" Remix) – 4:03
12. "Happy Birthday" – 4:01
13. "Are You My Baby" (My Man's 12") - 7:37
14. "Satisfaction" (12" Dance Mix) - 7:19
15. "Lolly Lolly" (Random Dance Mix) - 7:26

Cherry Pop/Virgin special edition (UK, 2011)

11. "Are You My Baby" (7" Remix) – 4:18
12. "Happy Birthday" – 3:58
13. "Lolly Lolly" (According to Prince) – 4:17
14. "Hip Hop Love" – 5:02
15. "Are You My Baby" (My Man's 12") – 7:36
16. "Satisfaction" (12" Dance Mix) – 7:14

== Personnel ==
Credits are adapted from the Fruit at the Bottom liner notes.

Wendy & Lisa

- Wendy Melvoin – lead and background vocals, guitars, bass, drums, programming
- Lisa Coleman – lead and background vocals, all piano and keyboards, programming

Additional musicians

- Susannah Melvoin – background vocals
- Cole Ynda – background vocals
- Carla Azar – drums
- Jesse Johnson – guitar on "Satisfaction"

== Charts ==
Chart performance for Fruit at the Bottom
Chart (1989)	Peak position
Dutch Albums (Album Top 100)	11
Swedish Albums (Sverigetopplistan)	25
Swiss Albums (Schweizer Hitparade)	27
UK Albums (OCC)	45
US Billboard 200	119
US Top R&B/Hip-Hop Albums (Billboard)	71
