= Jellycream =

Studio album by Doyle Bramhall II
- Released: September 14, 1999
- Genre: Blues, Rock
- Length: 53:34
- Label: RCA Records
- Producer: Tchad Blake

Doyle Bramhall II chronology
Doyle Bramhall II (1996)	Jellycream (1999)	Welcome (2001)

Professional ratings
Review scores
Source	Rating
allmusic	3/5 stars

Jellycream is the second studio album by the blues/rock guitarist Doyle Bramhall II. It was originally released in the US on September 14, 1999. The album is produced under the label RCA Records.

"I Wanna Be" and "Marry You" were re-recorded by Eric Clapton for Riding With The King, his first collaborative effort with B.B. King, which won the 2000 Grammy Award for Best Traditional Blues Album and was certified double platinum in the United States.

== Track listing ==
1. "I Wanna Be" (Bramhall, Charlie Sexton) - (3:50)
2. "Day Come Down" (Bramhall, Chris Bruce, Susannah Melvoin) - (3:57)
3. "Marry You"(Bramhall, Craig Ross, Susannah Melvoin) - (4:21)
4. "Snakecharmer" (Bramhall, Susannah Melvoin) - (4:28)
5. "Who I Am" (Bramhall, Bruce) - (3:46)
6. "Away We Go Away" (Bramhall, Lisa Coleman, Wendy Melvoin) - (4:18)
7. "Close To Heaven" (Bramhall, Bruce) - (4:24)
8. "I'm The One" (Bramhall, Coleman, Wendy Melvoin, Susannah Melvoin) - (3:30)
9. "Baby's Gone" (Bramhall, Bruce) - (4:02)
10. "I'm Leavin'" (Bramhall, Bruce, Susannah Melvoin) - (4:54)
11. "Chasin' The Sun" (Bramhall, Ross) - (4:15)
12. "I Will Remember" (Bramhall, Sexton, Susannah Melvoin) - (4:25)
13. "Chariot" (Bramhall, Susannah Melvoin) - (3:24)

== Personnel ==
- Susannah Melvoin - Percussion
- Wendy Melvoin - Bass, Guitar, Percussion
- Jamie Muhoberac - Keyboards
- Charley Drayton - Percussion, Drums
- Christopher McCants - Photography
- Jeri Heiden - Artwork, Design, Art Direction
- Doyle Bramhall II - Guitar, Percussion, Vocals, Drums
- John Heiden - Artwork, Art Direction, Design
- Chris Bruce - Bass Guitar, Background Vocals, Keyboards
- Lisa Coleman - Organ, Piano, Wurlitzer, Keyboards, Percussion
- C. Ross - Guitar, Pump Organ
- Tchad Blake - Percussion, Photography, Mixing, Producer, Engineer
- Mitchell Froom - Keyboards, Clavinet
- Lou Perez - Still Pictures
- Charlie Sexton - Bass, Guitar, Tack Piano

== Album review ==
Doyle Bramhall has really stepped up vocally on his second solo album, Jellycream. Lyrically this disc was considered improved over his debut solo disc, and he’s demonstrated a continued commitment to modern-day soul-blues vibe. This rocker from Texas has combined several different styles of music into one album with help from keyboardist Mitchell Froom, and ex-bandmates Chris Layton and Charlie Sexton. “Overall, the album is worth a listen. Bramhall is tight and driving, but can at times be subtly forceful, with underlying parts that really drive the song, while the stuff that jumps out at you can be less than fiery. All of this adds up to a strong album on the whole” (Brad Engler). It is definitely an improvement from his last album and has made him visible in the music scene.
