= Welcome (Doyle Bramhall II album) =

Studio album by Doyle Bramhall II
- Released: 2001, 2008 (Re-Released)
- Genre: Blues, Rock
- Length: 68:22
- Label: RCA Records
- Producer: Benmont Tench

Doyle Bramhall II chronology
Jellycream (1999)	Welcome (2001)	Rich Man (2016)

Professional ratings
Review scores
Source	Rating
allmusic	2.5/5 stars

Welcome is the third solo studio album by the blues rock guitarist Doyle Bramhall II, the first to feature his band Smokestack. It was first released in the US in 2001, then re-released in 2008. When it was re-released it was credited solely to Bramhall. The album is produced by Benmont Tench of Tom Petty and the Heartbreakers under the RCA Records label. An expanded 2CD edition was released on December 15, 2017.

== Track listing ==
1. "Green Light Girl"
2. "Problem Child"
3. "So You Want It to Rain"
4. "Life"
5. "Helpless Man"
6. "Soul Shaker"
7. "Send Some Love"
8. "Smokestack"
9. "Last Night"
10. "Blame"
11. "Thin Dream"
12. "Cry"

== Personnel ==
- Doyle Bramhall II - Guitar, Vocals
- Smokestack - Primary artist, Band
- Craig Ross - Guitars
- Susannah Melvoin - Percussion, Vocals
- Brian Gardner - Mastering
- Mike Scotella - Assistant Engineer
- Chris Bruce - Composer
- Jim Scott - Engineer, Mixing, Producer
- Shari Sutcliffe - Production Coordination
- Benmont Tench - Organ, Piano
