= Eroica (album) =

Studio album by Wendy & Lisa
- Released: July 16, 1990
- Recorded: 1990
- Genre: Rock
- Length: 49:15
- Label: Virgin
- Producer: Wendy & Lisa; Tony Berg

Wendy & Lisa chronology
Fruit at the Bottom (1989)	Eroica (1990)	Girl Bros. (1998)

Professional ratings
Review scores
Source	Rating
AllMusic	4/5 stars
Entertainment Weekly	B
Select	2/5 medals

Eroica is the third album by Wendy & Lisa, released through Virgin Records on July 16, 1990. It reached the top 40 of the UK Albums Chart.

== Album history ==
Wendy Melvoin's twin sister Susannah and Cole Ynda, Lisa's sister, contributed background vocal work to the record (as well as touring extensively with their sisters at the time) with k. d. lang adding background vocals to "Mother of Pearl".

Singles released from the album included "Strung Out" (UK No. 44), "Rainbow Lake" (UK No. 70) and "Don't Try to Tell Me" (UK No. 83).

Although the original UK album contained 11 tracks like the US release, Virgin Records in Europe also issued a limited-edition version with a bonus 3-inch CD titled Piano Improvisations with four tracks performed by Lisa Coleman. The album was reissued in the UK in 2017 by Cherry Red Records containing eleven bonus tracks.

== Track listing ==
All tracks written by Wendy Melvoin and Lisa Coleman except where noted.

1. "Rainbow Lake" – 4:42
2. "Strung Out" – 4:13
3. "Mother of Pearl" (Coleman, Melvoin, Tony Berg, Michael Penn) – 5:11
4. "Don't Try to Tell Me" (orchestrated by Michael Melvoin) – 4:43
5. "Crack in the Pavement" – 3:25
6. "Porch Swing" (music by Coleman, Melvoin, Chris Bruce, Carla Azar) – 5:25
7. "Why Wait for Heaven" (music by Coleman, Melvoin, Susannah Melvoin, Cole Ynda, Bruce, Azar) – 4:48
8. "Turn Me Inside Out" (Coleman, Melvoin, Susannah Melvoin) – 4:32
9. "Skeleton Key" (music by Coleman, Melvoin, Bruce, Susannah Melvoin, Azar, Ynda) – 4:12
10. "Valley Vista" – 3:44
11. "Staring at the Sun" – 4:20

Piano Improvisations – special limited-edition bonus disc

1. "Minneapolis #1"
2. "Minneapolis #2"
3. "Eric's Ghost"
4. "C-Ya"

Cherry Pop/Virgin special edition bonus disc (UK, 2017)

1. "Strung Out" (G-Strung 7")
2. "Stones and Birth"
3. "Rainbow Lake" (12 into 7 Remix)
4. "Balance"
5. "Don't Try to Tell Me" (alternative version)
6. "Strung Out" (G-Strung Mix)
7. "Rainbow Lake" (12" mix)
8. "Minneapolis #1"
9. "Minneapolis #2"
10. "Eric's Ghost"
11. "C-Ya"

== Personnel ==
- Wendy Melvoin – lead and background vocals, guitars, bass, drums, programming, other instruments
- Lisa Coleman – lead and background vocals, all piano and keyboards, programming, other instruments
- Susannah Melvoin – background vocals
- Cole Ynda – background vocals
- Carla Azar – drums
- Chris Bruce – guitar
- Allen Kamai – bass
- k.d. lang – featured vocals
- David Coleman – electric cello
- Tony Berg – hurdy-gurdy
- Eric Leeds – horns

== Charts ==
Chart performance for Eroica
Chart (1990)	Peak position
Dutch Albums (Album Top 100)	22
German Albums (Offizielle Top 100)	68
Swedish Albums (Sverigetopplistan)	21
UK Albums (OCC)	33
