= Dangerous Minds (soundtrack) =

Dangerous Minds: Music from the Motion Picture

Soundtrack album by various artists
- Released: July 11, 1995
- Recorded: 1994–1995
- Genres: Hip-hop; R&B; hip-hop soul; funk
- Length: 53:53
- Label: MCA Soundtracks
- Producers: Bass Mechanics; Chris Stokes; Claudio Cueni; Cyrus Esteban; DeVante Swing; DJ Evil Dee; Doug Rasheed; Franky J; Michael J. Powell; Mr. Dalvin; Pimp C; Tre Black; Trevor Horn; Timbaland (add.)

Singles from Dangerous Minds: Music from the Motion Picture
- 1. "Gangsta's Paradise" Released: August 1, 1995; 2. "Feel the Funk" Released: September 22, 1995; 3. "Curiosity" Released: October 31, 1995; 4. "Gin & Juice" Released: January 23, 1996

Professional ratings
Review scores
Source	Rating
AllMusic	4.5/5 stars
Entertainment Weekly	B+

Dangerous Minds: Music from the Motion Picture is the official soundtrack to John N. Smith's 1995 film Dangerous Minds, composed primarily of hip hop and R&B music. It was released on July 11, 1995 through MCA Soundtracks.

Production was handled by Cyrus Esteban, Franky J, Mr. Dalvin, Chris Stokes, Claudio Cueni, Doug Rasheed, Evil Dee, Michael J. Powell, Pimp C, The Bass Mechanics, Tre Black, Trevor Horn, and DeVante Swing, who also served as executive producer together with Don Simpson and Jerry Bruckheimer.

It features contributions from Rappin' 4-Tay, Static Major, 24-K, Aaron Hall, Big Mike, Craig Mack, Coolio, DeVante Swing, IMx, L.V., Mr. Dalvin, Sista, Tre Black, Wendy & Lisa.

In the United States, the soundtrack peaked atop the Billboard 200 albums and number two on the Top R&B/Hip-Hop Albums charts. On December 22, 1995, it was certified triple platinum by the Recording Industry Association of America, for shipments exceeding 3,000,000 copies in the US alone.

== Track listing ==
No.	Title	Writer(s)	Producer(s)	Length
1.	"Gangsta's Paradise" (performed by Coolio & L.V.)	Artis Ivey, Jr.; Larry Sanders; Doug Rasheed	Doug Rasheed	4:00
2.	"Curiosity" (performed by Aaron Hall)	Aaron Hall; Dalvin DeGrate; Melissa Elliott	Mr. Dalvin	4:02
3.	"Havin Thangs" (performed by Big Mike)	Michael Barnett; Will Barnett	Pimp C	4:45
4.	"Problems" (performed by Rappin' 4-Tay)	Anthony Forté; Frank Hudson, Jr.	Franky J; Cyrus Esteban	3:30
5.	"True O.G." (performed by Mr. Dalvin & Static Major)	DeGrate; Stephen Garrett; Tim Mosley	Mr. Dalvin; Timbaland (add.)	3:40
6.	"Put Ya Back into It" (performed by Tre Black)	Tre' Black; Michael Jerome Powell	Michael J. Powell; Tre Black	5:42
7.	"Don't Go There" (performed by 24-K)	Da S.W.A.T. Team	The Bass Mechanics	3:31
8.	"Feel the Funk" (performed by Immature)	Chris Stokes; Clarence Alexander Scarborough	Chris Stokes; Claudio Cueni	4:44
9.	"It's Alright" (performed by Sista & Craig Mack)	Elliott; Craig Mack; Ewart Dewgarde	DJ Evil Dee	5:12
10.	"A Message for Your Mind" (performed by Rappin' 4-Tay)	Forté; Freddie Perren; Alphonso Mizell; Berry Gordy; Dennis Lussier	Franky J; Cyrus Esteban	5:00
11.	"Gin & Juice" (performed by DeVante Swing & Static Major)	Donald Earle DeGrate, Jr.	DeVante Swing	5:08
12.	"This Is the Life" (performed by Wendy & Lisa)	Wendy Melvoin; Lisa Coleman; Kris Bell	Trevor Horn	4:39
Total length:				53:53

Sample credits

- Track 1 contains a sample from "Pastime Paradise" written and performed by Stevie Wonder.
- Track 7 contains elements from "Respect" written by Otis Redding.
- Track 8 contains elements from "Love Changes" performed by Mother's Finest.
- Track 10 contains elements from "I Want You Back" written by Freddie Perren, Alphonso Mizell, Berry Gordy and Dennis Lussier and performed by The Jackson 5.

== Personnel ==
- Artis "Coolio" Ivey, Jr. – performer (track 1)
- Larry "L.V." Sanders – performer (track 1)
- Aaron Hall – performer (track 2)
- Michael "Big Mike" Barnett – performer (track 3)
- Anthony "Rappin' 4-Tay" Forté – performer (tracks: 4, 10)
- Dalvin "Mr. Dalvin" DeGrate – performer (track 5), producer (tracks: 2, 5)
- Stephen "Static Major" Garrett – performer (tracks: 5, 11)
- Tre Black – performer & producer (track 6)
- 24-K – performer (track 7)
- Immature – performer (track 8)
- Sista – performer (track 9)
- Craig Mack – performer (track 9)
- Donald "DeVante Swing" DeGrate, Jr. – performer & producer (track 11), executive producer
- Wendy Melvoin – performer (track 12)
- Lisa Coleman – performer (track 12)
- Doug Rasheed – producer (track 1)
- Chad "Pimp C" Butler – producer (track 3)
- Frank "Franky J" Hudson, Jr. – producer (tracks: 4, 10)
- Cyrus Esteban – producer (tracks: 4, 10)
- Michael J. Powell – producer (track 6)
- Johnny "Jay Ski" McGowan – producer (track 7)
- Van "Thrill Da Playa" Bryant – producer (track 7)
- Chris Stokes – producer (track 8)
- Claudio Cueni – producer (track 8)
- Ewart C. "DJ Evil Dee" Dewgarde – producer (track 9)
- Timothy "Timbaland" Mosley – additional producer (track 5)
- Brian Kinkead – engineering (track 2)
- Gerhard P. Joost II – engineering (track 11)
- Ross Donaldson – engineering (track 11)
- Trevor Horn – producer (track 12)
- Herb Powers Jr. – mastering
- Don Simpson – executive producer
- Jerry Bruckheimer – executive producer
- Vartan Kurjian – art direction
- Wilson Design Group – design
- Linda R. Chen – photography
- Robert Reives – A&R
- Bill Green – coordinator
- Kevin Breen – coordinator
- Lesley Allery – coordinator
- Sylvia Krask – coordinator
- Todd Homme – coordinator
- Christine Edwards – coordinator
- Sheryl Konigsberg – coordinator
- Karyl "Kap" Laws – coordinator
- Kathy Nelson – supervisor

== Charts ==
=== Weekly charts ===
Chart (1995–1996)	Peak position
Australian Albums (ARIA)	1
Austrian Albums (Ö3 Austria)	1
Belgian Albums (Ultratop Flanders)	23
Belgian Albums (Ultratop Wallonia)	40
Canada Top Albums/CDs (RPM)	1
Dutch Albums (Album Top 100)	56
German Albums (Offizielle Top 100)	12
New Zealand Albums (RMNZ)	3
Swedish Albums (Sverigetopplistan)	38
Swiss Albums (Schweizer Hitparade)	3
UK Compilation Albums (Official Charts)	13
US Billboard 200	1
US Top R&B/Hip-Hop Albums (Billboard)	2

=== Year-end charts ===
Chart (1995)	Position
Australian Albums (ARIA)	30
Canada Top Albums/CDs (RPM)	15
US Billboard 200	17
US Top R&B/Hip-Hop Albums (Billboard)	22

Chart (1996)	Position
Austrian Albums (Ö3 Austria)	33

== Certifications and sales ==
Region	Certification	Certified units/sales
Australia (ARIA)	Platinum	70,000^{^}
Austria (IFPI Austria)	Gold	25,000^{*}
Canada (Music Canada)	4× Platinum	400,000^{^}
France	—	210,000
New Zealand (RMNZ)	Platinum	15,000^{^}
Poland (ZPAV)	Gold	50,000^{*}
Spain (Promusicae)	Gold	50,000^{^}
United States (RIAA)	3× Platinum	3,000,000^{^}
^{*} Sales figures based on certification alone.^{^} Shipments figures based on certification alone.

== See also ==
- List of top 25 albums for 1995 in Australia
- List of Billboard 200 number-one albums of 1995
