= White Flags of Winter Chimneys =

Studio album by Wendy & Lisa
- Released: December 9, 2008
- Recorded: Early 2008
- Studios: Henson, Hollywood, California
- Genres: Alternative, pop
- Label: Girl Bros.
- Producers: Wendy Melvoin, Lisa Coleman

Wendy & Lisa chronology
Girl Bros (1998)	White Flags of Winter Chimneys (2008)	Heroes: Original Score from the Television Series (2009)

White Flags of Winter Chimneys is a 2008 album by Wendy & Lisa. It is their fifth studio album (and to date, their last) and was released on December 9, 2008. The album was written, played, and produced all by Wendy Melvoin and Lisa Coleman.

It was the band's first album in a decade. Melvoin and Coleman were focused on creating musical scores for the television show Heroes, and wrote the album while the show was briefly on hiatus due to a writer's strike.

The title is taken from a lyric in the Joni Mitchell song, "Hejira".

== Track listing ==
All songs written by Wendy Melvoin and Lisa Coleman.

1. "Balloon" – 4:20
2. "Invisible" – 4:57
3. "Ever After" – 3:54
4. "Salt & Cherries (MC5)" – 4:04
5. "Niagara Falls" – 4:07
6. "Red Bike" – 4:49
7. "You and I" – 2:55
8. "White Flags of Winter Chimneys" – 4:10
9. "Sweet Suite (Beginning at the End)" – 8:41

=== Digital-only bonus tracks ===
10. "Niagara Falls" (Lisa Demo 4_1_1997) – 5:17
11. "The Dream" (1992 home demo) – 4:58
12. "Viste" (1993 Happy Birthday Maxine home recording) – 4:30
13. "Waiting for Coffee" (1995 home demo) – 4:03
