= Living in a Dream (album) =

Live album by Arc Angels
- Released: November 1, 2009
- Genre: Blues, Rock
- Label: Mark One Records

Arc Angels chronology
Arc Angels (1992)	Living in a Dream (2009)

Living in a Dream is a live album by the Texas blues rock band Arc Angels. The first disk of the album contains the majority of a show recorded on March 26, 2005, at Stubb's Bar-B-Q in Austin, Texas. The show which proved to be historic for the band. They played the entirety of their debut album, a then unreleased song "Crave and Wonder" and a cover of Muddy Waters' "She's Alright." This show also proved to be the Arc Angels' final with original bass guitarist Tommy Shannon. The second disk contains 3 studio tracks recorded specifically for this album as well as the remainder of the 2005 show—along with the song "Spanish Moon." The DVD contains the Stubb's show and interview footage directed by Kyle Ellison and produced by Mark Proct and Charlie Boswell.

== History ==
Members of Arc Angels, minus Shannon, announced that they would be reuniting—releasing a live album and DVD of Shannon's final show at Stubb's in 2005. The album/DVD Living in a Dream was released in 2009 and contained live renditions of previously released Arc Angels songs, new songs performed live and three newly recorded studio tracks. Arc Angels launched The Living in a Dream tour at Austin's annual South by Southwest Festival. Following the tour the band never officially broke up again but the band members pursued solo projects with Sexton rejoining Bob Dylan's band and Bramhall resuming his solo career and work with Eric Clapton. There have been no talks about future Arc Angels releases or concerts to this date. While on stage in concert in 2014 Bramhall referred to the Arc Angels as "this band I was in" further confirming their demise.

== Contents ==
The first disk contains all of the March 26 show minus "Spanish Moon." The second disk contains a studio recording of the Sexton's penned "Crave And Wonder," the Bramhall penned R&B influenced "What I’m Looking For," and a bluesy rendition of Paul McCartney's 1971 Lennon putdown song "Too Many People."

The DVD presents the video footage for all the songs on the main CD. Because the concert was performed at an outdoor amphitheater and there was some intermittent rain on the night of the recording the footage is somewhat incomplete—but the gaps were filled with some road scenes, shots from other Arc Angels concerts from around the same time, and a few random shots. The DVD also contains a documentary and a tribute to Clifford Antone—the late, great blues club owner who nurtured the Austin Blues Music Scene into the mammoth it is today. The documentary is essentially the band speaking directly to the camera about their views on the debut album and its subsequent tour. The Antone Tribute continues in the same vein—with the group members offering their thoughts on the importance of Antone to their careers and Blues as a whole.

== Track listing ==
=== Disk one ===
1. "Paradise Cafe"
2. "Carry Me On"
3. "The Famous Jane"
4. "Good Time"
5. "She's Alright"
6. "Always Believed in You"
7. "Sent by Angels"
8. "Crave and Wonder"
9. "Sweet Nadine"
10. "See What Tomorrow Brings"
11. "Shape I'm In"
12. "Living in a Dream"
13. "Too Many Ways to Fall"

=== Disk two ===
1. "Crave and Wonder"
2. "What I'm Looking For"
3. "Too Many People"
4. "Spanish Moon"

== Personnel ==
- Doyle Bramhall II - guitar, vocals
- Charlie Sexton - guitar, vocals
- Chris Layton - drums
- Tommy Shannon - bass (live tracks)
- Dave Mansey - bass (studio tracks)
