= Pop Life (song) =

- US 7" single

Single by Prince and the Revolution

from the album Around the World in a Day
- B-side: "Hello" (US); "Girl" (UK)
- Released: July 15, 1985
- Recorded: February 19, 1984
- Studio: Sunset Sound, Hollywood
- Genre: Psychedelic pop; funk
- Length: 3:42 (7"/album version); 6:16 (Fresh Dance Mix); 9:07 (UK extended version)
- Label: Paisley Park, Warner Bros.
- Songwriter: Prince
- Producer: Prince

Prince and the Revolution singles chronology
"Raspberry Beret" (1985)	"Pop Life" (1985)	"America" (1985)

Music video
- "Pop Life" on YouTube

"Pop Life" is a song by Prince and the Revolution. It was the second US (and final UK) single from their 1985 album, Around the World in a Day, reaching number 7 in the US charts, becoming Prince's eighth top-ten hit in a two-year span.

== Production ==
The song starts with a faded-in synth line and quickly starts the main tune. The easy groove is achieved with a smooth bass guitar and piano embellishments. A drum machine provides handclaps to make the song danceable. "Pop Life" was recorded before Purple Rain was completed, indicating the new direction Prince wanted to take after the success of that album and film. Lyrically, the song describes the tiresome and stressful side of the celebrity life, including the pressure that can lead to drug use ("What you putting in your nose?/Is that where all your money goes?").

=== "Throw the bum out!" ===
The song includes a portion that features the sound of bell ringing for a boxing match, followed by the sound of a restless crowd with someone yelling "throw the bum out!" This was rumored to be taken from an actual concert in 1981 when Prince opened for the Rolling Stones in Los Angeles. Relatively unknown at the time, Prince was booed off stage by the crowd. He returned for the second show, getting a better reception, but with still some booing; Prince quit the tour shortly after. In reality, the bits are from a sound effects library; the same riot crowd sound effect can be heard in the 1982 horror film Alone in the Dark in the scene where a store is being looted (even the line "throw the bum out" can be heard at 35 minutes and 50 seconds into the movie). The reason for the sample's inclusion is unknown even to Prince himself; when asked about it on his online forum, Prince responded "Good ? - Me 2 :)" ("good question, me too :)").

== Releases ==
The song was released in two extended versions. The UK 12" single version is a 9-minute extension of the tune, and ends with a similar synth sound as the beginning. The US received a "Fresh Dance Mix", which is a remix (by Sheila E.) that included some portions of the longer UK version. It clocks in at 6:16, and was included on the 2006 compilation album, Ultimate.

The US B-side of the track was "Hello", written quickly as a response to those who criticized Prince's lack of participation in the "We Are the World" event. The angry lyrics lambaste the prying media and false friendships, and is driven by a pulsing beat. The extended version of the song ends with a spoken word by Prince, which contain some self-humor about his high-heeled shoes. The UK B-side was "Girl", which the US had as the B-side of "America".

== Reception ==
Cashbox called it a "much more of a substantial offering — lyrically and musically — than [Prince's previous single] 'Raspberry Beret,'" saying that it "takes a look at the myths of the pop world and aspirations to that world."

== Music Video ==
The first-ever official music video for the song was released to Prince's official YouTube November 8, 2025. It was directed by Kii Arens with animation done by Eben Zboch.

== Personnel ==
Information taken from Duane Tudahl, Benoît Clerc, Guitarcloud, and the Prince Vault website.

- Prince – lead vocals, piano, Oberheim OB-8, bass guitar
- Sheila E. – drums, Linn LM-1 (and uncredited additional vocals on the Fresh Dance Mix)
- Lisa Coleman – background vocals
- Wendy Melvoin – background vocals

Orchestral players (Segue to The Ladder)

- Violins – Sid Page and Marcy Dicterow-Vaj
- Violas – Denyse Buffum and Laury Woods
- Stand-up bass – Tim Barr and Annette Atkinson

== Charts ==
Weekly chart performance for "Pop Life"
Chart (1985–1986)	Peak position
Australia (Kent Music Report)	67
Belgium (Ultratop 50 Flanders)	34
Germany (GfK)	65
New Zealand (Recorded Music NZ)	44
UK Singles (OCC)	60
US Billboard Hot 100	7
US Cashbox	7

2016 weekly chart performance for "Pop Life"
Chart (2016)	Peak position
France (SNEP)	116
