= America (Prince song) =

- US 7" single

Single by Prince and The Revolution

from the album Around the World in a Day
- B-side: "Girl"
- Released: October 2, 1985
- Recorded: July 23, 1984
- Studio: Flying Cloud Drive Warehouse, Eden Prairie, Minnesota
- Genre: Funk
- Length: 3:40 (7" / album version); 21:46 (12" version)
- Label: Paisley Park; Warner Bros.
- Songwriters: Prince and The Revolution
- Producers: Prince and The Revolution

Prince and The Revolution singles chronology
"Pop Life" (1985)	"America" (1985)	"Kiss" (1986)

"America" is a song by Prince and The Revolution. It was the final US single from the group's 1985 album, Around the World in a Day.

== Background ==
"America" is a sardonic attack on the mid-1980s United States, referencing Communism, and worrying about nuclear war, a common theme in Prince's lyrics in the 1980s. The song begins with the sound of a record starting and stopping, as if being cued by a DJ. This leads into a guitar solo and a rising synthesized flute line. The main tune is standard rock and roll and fades out at 3:40. The 12-inch single extended version is notable for being over 21 minutes long and including various instrumental solos. The song fades just before the audio tape ran out, as Prince and the Revolution had jammed the song out until there was no more room on the tape. The video for this song, a 10-minute live version, was shot on October 27, 1985 during a "One Off" performance in Nice, France at Théâtre de Verdure and shown on MTV during an entire segment dedicated to the single. This would be the first televised interview that Prince gave since 1980 on American Bandstand. The segment included a live rendition of "America" and a one-on-one interview with fans surrounding Prince.

The B-side of the track is "Girl", a light pop number that speaks of Prince's lust for a woman. Featuring a minimal drum loop and sparse synthesizer lines, Prince's lust is in such force that he declares, "All I have to do is think about you, and I can have an orgasm," as he invites her to both feel how sweaty his hands have gotten from their meeting, and let him be "the water in your bath". The full-length version from the 12-inch single features backmasking of Vanity reciting the lyrics with the word "boy" replacing the word "girl".

== Reception ==
Cash Box said that the song is an "out and out jam" that "starts out with a deceptive and funny turntable-fooling intro and works into a sly comment on the American way using a traditional American melody." Billboard called it "jagged socio-funk that tips its hat to Hendrix."

Greg Tate of Spin wrote, "It makes you wonder what happened to the juice this boy used to kick out the jams with. Its political perspective also leaves me in a lurch and worried for his soul, particularly the lines where we're told how little sister is living in a monkey cage, barely making it on minimum wage, but glad she ain't living in the USSR."

== Personnel ==
Information taken from Duane Tudahl, Benoît Clerc, and Guitarcloud.

- Prince – lead and backing vocals, electric guitar, synthesizers, bass guitar, Linn LM-1
- Wendy Melvoin – electric guitar
- Lisa Coleman – synthesizers
- Dr. Fink – synthesizers
- Brownmark – bass guitar
- Bobby Z. – Simmons SDSV
- Brad Marsh – tambourine

== Charts ==
Chart performance for "America"
Chart (1985–1986)	Peak position
Belgium (Ultratop 50 Flanders)	35
US Billboard Hot 100	46
US Billboard Hot Black Singles	35
US Cashbox Top 100	46
