= Dream Factory (album) =

Studio album by Prince and the Revolution
- Released: 20 July 1996
- Recorded: July 1984 ("Slow Love"); April 1985 ("All My Dreams"); June 1985 (Wendy and Lisa's overdubbed version of "Strange Relationship" and a reworked version of "Teacher, Teacher")–July 1986 ("Train", "I Could Never Take the Place of Your Man", "Sign o' the Times" and "The Cross")
- Label: Paisley Park; Warner Bros.
- Producer: Prince and the Revolution

Dream Factory is an unreleased double LP project by Prince and the Revolution.

== History ==
Prince's band, the Revolution, was invited to the studio in 1986 to contribute to a majority of the material for the planned album, with the notable exceptions of "The Ballad of Dorothy Parker" and "Starfish & Coffee" (co-written by Susannah Melvoin). Some tracks included a few band members, most tracks none, some were full band recordings or included other musicians such as Sheila E. But in September 1986 at the end of the Parade Tour, Prince was too frustrated with the Revolution. The band was dissolved in October 1986, after which many of the album's tracks were incorporated into what was now a planned solo three LP project titled Crystal Ball. However, Prince's record distributor at the time, Warner Bros., balked at a three-LP release, so the project was reduced to a two-LP set and retitled Sign o' the Times. Mavis Staples would later cover "Train" on her 1989 album Time Waits for No One; Prince's version would not be released until 2020.

In March 2009, Vibe magazine featured the album on its "51 Albums That Never Were", calling it a "coulda-been classic", and even streaming "All My Dreams" for a limited time. Vibe also interviewed former Revolution members Wendy and Lisa on the project.

Even though the album was never officially released, there is a bootleg CD available of the July 1986 track configuration, which comes with a colored pencil sketch made by Susannah Melvoin as cover, which was a concept for the prospective sleeve. This album cover is attributed to The Flesh rather than Prince and the Revolution.

A Super Deluxe Edition of Sign o' the Times was released on September 25, 2020, which included outtakes from the Dream Factory/Camille/Crystal Ball sessions as bonus tracks.

== Track listings ==
April 22, 1986 configuration
No.	Title	Release(s)	Length
1.	"Visions"	Eroica (Special Edition) (Renamed "Minneapolis #1"); Sign o' the Times – Super Deluxe Edition
2.	"Dream Factory"	Crystal Ball
3.	"It's a Wonderful Day"	Sign o' the Times – Super Deluxe Edition (Renamed "Wonderful Day")
4.	"The Ballad of Dorothy Parker"	Sign o' the Times
5.	"Big Tall Wall"	Sign o' the Times – Super Deluxe Edition
6.	"And That Says What?"	Sign o' the Times – Super Deluxe Edition
7.	"Strange Relationship"	Sign o' the Times (heavily remixed); Sign o' the Times – Super Deluxe Edition (original version)
8.	"Teacher, Teacher"	1999 – Super Deluxe Expanded Edition (1982 version); Sign o' the Times – Super Deluxe Edition (1985 version)
9.	"Starfish and Coffee" (omits alarm clock intro)	Sign o' the Times
10.	"A Place in Heaven"	Sign o' the Times – Super Deluxe Edition
11.	"Sexual Suicide"	Crystal Ball

June 3, 1986 configuration
No.	Title	Release(s)	Length
1.	"Visions"	Eroica; Sign o' the Times – Super Deluxe Edition
2.	"Dream Factory"	Crystal Ball
3.	"It's a Wonderful Day"	Sign o' the Times – Super Deluxe Edition (Renamed "Wonderful Day")
4.	"The Ballad of Dorothy Parker"	Sign o' the Times
5.	"It"	Sign o' the Times
6.	"Strange Relationship"	Sign o' the Times (heavily remixed); Sign o' the Times – Super Deluxe Edition (original version)
7.	"Teacher, Teacher"	1999 – Super Deluxe Expanded Edition (1982 version); Sign o' the Times – Super Deluxe Edition (1985 version)
8.	"Starfish and Coffee" (omits alarm clock intro)	Sign o' the Times
9.	"Interlude ("Wendy")"	Sign o' the Times – Super Deluxe Edition (Renamed "Colors")
10.	"Nevaeh Ni Ecalp A"	Sign o' the Times – Super Deluxe Edition
11.	"In a Large Room with No Light"	Re-recorded in 2009 for the Montreux Jazz Festival; Sign o' the Times – Super Deluxe Edition (1986 studio version)
12.	"A Place in Heaven"	Sign o' the Times – Super Deluxe Edition
13.	"Sexual Suicide"	Crystal Ball
14.	"Crystal Ball"	Crystal Ball
15.	"Power Fantastic"	The Hits/The B-Sides (without introduction)
16.	"Last Heart"	Crystal Ball
17.	"Witness 4 the Prosecution"	Sign o' the Times – Super Deluxe Edition
18.	"Movie Star"	Crystal Ball
19.	"A Place in Heaven"	Sign o' the Times – Super Deluxe Edition
20.	"All My Dreams"	Sign o' the Times – Super Deluxe Edition

July 18, 1986 configuration
No.	Title	Release(s)	Length
1.	"Visions"	Eroica; Sign o' the Times – Super Deluxe Edition
2.	"Nevaeh Ni Ecalp A"	Sign o' the Times – Super Deluxe Edition
3.	"Dream Factory"	Crystal Ball
4.	"Train"	Sign o' the Times – Super Deluxe Edition
5.	"The Ballad of Dorothy Parker"	Sign o' the Times
6.	"It"	Sign o' the Times
7.	"Strange Relationship"	Sign o' the Times (heavily remixed); Sign o' the Times – Super Deluxe Edition (original version)
8.	"Starfish & Coffee" (omits alarm clock intro)	Sign o' the Times
9.	"Slow Love"	Sign o' the Times
10.	"Interlude"	Sign o' the Times – Super Deluxe Edition (Renamed "Colors")
11.	"I Could Never Take the Place of Your Man"	Sign o' the Times
12.	"Sign o' the Times" (single version)	Sign o' the Times
13.	"Crystal Ball"	Crystal Ball
14.	"A Place in Heaven"	Sign o' the Times – Super Deluxe Edition
15.	"The Cross"	Sign o' the Times
16.	"Last Heart"	Crystal Ball
17.	"Witness 4 the Prosecution"	Sign o' the Times – Super Deluxe Edition
18.	"Movie Star"	Crystal Ball
19.	"All My Dreams"	Sign o' the Times – Super Deluxe Edition

July 20, 1986 configuration
No.	Title	Release(s)	Length
1.	"Visions"	Eroica; Sign o' the Times – Super Deluxe Edition
2.	"Nevaeh Ni Ecalp A"	Sign o' the Times – Super Deluxe Edition
3.	"Dream Factory"	Crystal Ball
4.	"Train"	Sign o' the Times – Super Deluxe Edition
5.	"The Ballad of Dorothy Parker"	Sign o' the Times
6.	"It"	Sign o' the Times
7.	"Strange Relationship"	Sign o' the Times (heavily remixed); Sign o' the Times – Super Deluxe Edition (original version)
8.	"Slow Love"	Sign o' the Times
9.	"Starfish & Coffee" (omits alarm clock intro)	Sign o' the Times
10.	"Interlude"	Sign o' the Times – Super Deluxe Edition (Renamed "Colors")
11.	"I Could Never Take the Place of Your Man"	Sign o' the Times
12.	"Sign o' the Times" (single version)	Sign o' the Times
13.	"Crystal Ball"	Crystal Ball
14.	"A Place in Heaven"	Sign o' the Times – Super Deluxe Edition
15.	"Last Heart"	Crystal Ball
16.	"Witness 4 the Prosecution"	Sign o' the Times – Super Deluxe Edition
17.	"Movie Star"	Crystal Ball
18.	"The Cross"	Sign o' the Times
19.	"All My Dreams"	Sign o' the Times – Super Deluxe Edition
