= Music of Heroes =

The music of the Heroes television series was composed by Wendy Melvoin and Lisa Coleman of the duo, Wendy & Lisa. Some of the scores feature the voice of L. Shankar (credited as Shenkar). The score album and the soundtrack album were released via La-La Land Records. The soundtrack of the series contains some songs, including old ones.

== Heroes: Original Soundtrack ==
Heroes: Original Soundtrack

Soundtrack album by Various artists
- Released: March 18, 2008
- Recorded: Various dates
- Genres: Pop, alternative rock
- Label: Adrenaline Music
- Producers: Errol Kolosine; Tim Kring; Arkush

Professional ratings
Review scores
Source	Rating
AllMusic	3/5 stars

Heroes: Original Soundtrack is the official Heroes soundtrack. It was released on March 18, 2008 by The NBC Universal Television, DVD, Music & Consumer Products Group. It contains recordings from the series' score by Wendy Melvoin and Lisa Coleman, including the show's theme music. The record also includes contributions from Panic! at the Disco, Wilco, Imogen Heap, Bob Dylan, Nada Surf and David Bowie, among other artists and bands. One of the contributions is "All Things Must Pass", the first new song in 10 years from The Jesus and Mary Chain. They released a re-recorded version of the song, under the title "All Things Pass", on their 2017 album Damage and Joy.

On February 29, 2008, NBC Universal Television, DVD, Music & Consumer Products Group released five music videos created by Heroes producer/director Allan Arkush, each combining show footage with songs from the soundtrack. The music videos were released on Zune and MSN.

=== Track listing ===
Track	Title	Contributing artist
1.	Heroes Title	Wendy & Lisa
2.	Fire and Regeneration	Wendy & Lisa feat. Shankar
3.	He's Frank	Brighton Port Authority feat. Iggy Pop
4.	All for Swinging You Around	The New Pornographers
5.	Glad It's Over	Wilco
6.	Nine in the Afternoon	Panic! at the Disco
7.	Weightless	Nada Surf
8.	Natural Selection	Wendy & Lisa
9.	ABoneCroneDrone 3 (Excerpt)	Sheila Chandra
10.	Chills (Master Mix)	My Morning Jacket
11.	Jealousy Rides with Me	Death Cab for Cutie
12.	Not Now, But Soon	Imogen Heap
13.	Homecoming	Wendy & Lisa
14.	All Things Must Pass	The Jesus and Mary Chain
15.	Man in the Long Black Coat	Bob Dylan
16.	Maya's Theme	Cucu Diamantes & Yerba Buena
17.	Keeping My Composure	The Chemical Brothers feat. Spank Rock
18.	"Heroes"	David Bowie

=== Absent from official soundtrack ===
The following tracks and pieces featured in the show are absent from the official soundtrack. Note that Season 3 and later were broadcast after the release of the official soundtrack.

==== Season 1 ====
- "Eyes" by Rogue Wave, which was featured in the first and fourth episode.
- "Ooh La La" by Goldfrapp, which was featured in episode 20, "Five Years Gone".

==== Season 2 ====
- "Peter Piper" by Run DMC, featured in episode 1 of season 2, playing on West's car radio
- "Boyz" by M.I.A., which was featured in episode 5 of season 2.
- "We Interrupt This Programme" by Coburn, which was featured in the 8th episode of season 2.

==== Season 3 ====
- "Born to be Wild" by Steppenwolf, which was featured in episode 16 of season 3.
- "Psycho Killer" by Talking Heads, also featured in episode 16 of season 3.
- "The Chain" by Fleetwood Mac, which was featured in episode 18 of season 3.
- "We Gotta Get out of This Place" by "The Animals", which was featured in episode 21 of season 3.
- "Runaway" by Del Shannon, also featured in episode 21 of season 3.

==== Season 4 ====
- "Superstition" by Stevie Wonder, featured in episode 1 of season 4.
- "An Honest Mistake" by The Bravery, also in episode 1.
- "Grapevine Fires" by Death Cab for Cutie, featured in episode 2.
- "Bad Body Double" by Imogen Heap, in episode 3.

== Heroes: Original Score ==
Heroes: Original Score from the Television Series

Soundtrack album by Wendy & Lisa
- Released: April 14, 2009
- Recorded: Various dates
- Genres: Soundtrack, ambient
- Label: La-La Land

Wendy & Lisa chronology
White Flags of Winter Chimneys (2008)	''Heroes: Original Score from the Television Series'' (2009)	Nurse Jackie: Season One Soundtrack (2010)

Heroes: Original Score from the Television Series is a soundtrack album from the NBC TV series Heroes. It was released on April 14, 2009, via La-La Land Records, and contains the score written by Wendy Melvoin and Lisa Coleman (primarily music written for the first season), and features the voice of Shenkar. Heroes executive producer Allan Arkush contributes to the liner notes. The score album includes the four cues featured on the song album, "Heroes Title", "Fire and Regeneration", "Natural Selection" and "Homecoming"—the latter two are included in the suites for Mohinder and Claire, respectively.

=== Track listing ===
Track	Title	Time
1.	Heroes Title*	0:14
2.	Peter*	6:12
3.	Claire	6:43
4.	Hiro	7:30
5.	HRG*	6:24
6.	Mohinder	7:59
7.	Sylar*	5:30
8.	Jessica / Niki / Gina	5:55
9.	Kirby Plaza*	5:41
10.	Fire and Regeneration*	2:21
Total playing time		54:49

(*) Featuring the voice of Shenkar
