= Rich Man (album) =

Studio album by Doyle Bramhall II
- Released: September 30, 2016
- Genre: Blues, rock
- Label: Concord Records

Doyle Bramhall II chronology
Welcome (2001)	Rich Man (2016)

Rich Man is the fourth solo studio album by guitarist Doyle Bramhall II, his first since 2001 and his first since the breakup of his backing band Smokestack It was released worldwide on September 30, 2016, on Concord Records. Bramhall wrote many of the album's songs as a tribute to his late father who died in 2011.

== Track listing ==
1. "Mama Can't Help You (Believe It)"
2. "November"
3. "The Veil"
4. "My People"
5. "New Faith" (featuring Norah Jones)
6. "Keep You Dreamin'"
7. "Hands Up"
8. "Rich Man"
9. "Harmony"
10. "Cries of Ages"
11. "Saharan Crossing"
12. "The Samanas"
13. "Hear My Train A Comin'"

== Personnel ==
- Doyle Bramhall II - acoustic guitar (1, 5, 8, 9, 11), electric guitar (1–4, 6, 7, 10, 12), 12 string guitar (4, 13), steel drum (6), drums (8), hi-hat (6), percussion (11), handclaps (5), bass guitar (3), baritone guitar (2, 4), vocals
- Cian Riordan - organ (1), percussion (7, 11)
- Woody Jackson - electric guitar (1), upright bass (7), L'outer (8), bass guitar (12)
- Chris Bruce - electric guitar (1, 3, 6), bass guitar (6, 12)
- Tim Lefebvre - bass guitar (1)
- James Gadson - drums (1)
- Davey Chegwidden - percussion (1), timpani (12)
- Christina Courtin - violin (1–3, 8, 9), viola (1)
- Glenn Patscha - Hammond B3 (2, 3, 9), chord organ (2)
- Sebastian Steinberg - bass guitar (2, 8)
- Carla Azar - drums (2, 8, 12), percussion (2)
- Adam Minkoff - vibraphone (2, 9, 10), Moog bass (3), electric guitar (9, 10, 13), 12 string guitar (4), Hammond B3 (10), upright bass (5), clavinet (6), waterphone (13), handclaps (5), vocals (4–6, 9, 10)
- Michael Eaton - tenor saxophone (2), flute (2)
- David Luther - alto saxophone (2)
- Dan Brantigan - trumpet (2)
- Miranda Sielaff - viola (2, 3, 8, 9)
- Caitlin Sullivan - cello (2, 3, 8, 9)
- Alecia Chakour - vocals (2, 8)
- Abby Ahmad - vocals (2)
- Elizabeth Ziman - vocals (2)
- Abe Rounds - drums (3, 6, 7, 12), percussion, timpani (12)
- Jay Bellerose - drums (3), percussion (3)
- Paul Stacey - 12 string guitar
- Ted Pecchio - bass guitar (4, 9, 10, 13)
- Anthony Cole - drums (4, 9, 10, 13), vocals (4, 6, 10)
- Devdutt Joshi - harmonium (4)
- Ustad Surjeet Singh - sarangi (4)
- KZ Jones - vocals (4)
- Brittany Anjou - vocals (4)
- Ryan Scott - vocals (4)
- Norah Jones - vocals (5), handclaps (5)
- Jon Cowherd - pump organ (5)
- Sean Dixon - drums (5), percussion (5)
- Keefus Ciancia - keyboards (6)
- Kofi Burbridge - Hammond B3 (7)
- Binky Griptite - guitar (8), vocals (8)
- Joe Crispiano - guitar (8)
- Mila Stribling - vocals (8)
- Yuval Ron - oud (11), percussion (11)
- Michael Harris - tape echo (12)

Produced by Doyle Bramhall II
Co-produced by Woody Jackson, Andy Taub, Adam Minkoff, and Michael Harris
Engineered by Michael Harris at Vox Recording Studios, Los Angeles, CA
and Andy Taub at Brooklyn Recording Studios, Brooklyn, NY

Mixed by Cian Riordan at Barefoot Recording, Hollywood, CA

"Saharan Crossing" engineered by Cian Riordan

Additional co-production on "My People" by Paul Stacey at Paul Stacey Studios, London, UK
Additional engineering: Woody Jackson, Cian Riordan, Paul Stacey, Justin Stanley, Alex Killpartrick, Adam Tilzer, Ted Pecchio, Aurélien Jubault, and Dan Brantigan

All string and horn arrangements by Adam Minkoff except "Mama Can't Help You" string arrangement by Paul Stacey

Mastered by Brian Lucey at Magic Garden Mastering, Los Angeles, CA

== Charts ==
Chart (2016)	Peak position
Belgian Albums (Ultratop Flanders)	183
US Billboard 200	187
