= Anotherloverholenyohead =

1986 single by Prince and The Revolution

- US 12-inch single

Single by Prince and The Revolution

from the album Parade
- B-side: "Girls & Boys"
- Released: July 2, 1986
- Studio: Sunset Sound (Hollywood, California)
- Length: 3:58 (album version); 3:23 (7-inch edit)
- Label: Paisley Park; Warner Bros.
- Songwriter: Prince
- Producer: Prince

Prince and The Revolution singles chronology
"Mountains" (1986)	"Anotherloverholenyohead" (1986)	"Girls & Boys" (1986)

"Anotherloverholenyohead" is a song by Prince and The Revolution from the album Parade, the soundtrack to the film Under the Cherry Moon. The US B-side is the LP version of "Girls & Boys", but since that was already released as a single on its own in the UK, the B-side there was "I Wanna Be Your Lover", from 1979's Prince. Despite a large amount of publicity provided by its predecessors and the film Under the Cherry Moon, the single stalled at number 63 on the US Billboard Hot 100 and number 36 on the UK Singles Chart.

== Composition ==
The song is essentially a solo performance by Prince, with backing vocals from Susannah Melvoin and the horn section of Eric Leeds and Atlanta Bliss on the extended version. The song also features a string arrangement by Clare Fischer. The song is set in a minor key and written around a piano chord sequence, although the arrangement emphasizes an upfront guitar synth and a drum machine. The lyrics are about a man trying to reclaim a lover who is intent on leaving him for another. The song's title is a combination of the main idea of the song, and the line "U need another lover like u need a hole in yo head" from the chorus. The single received a 12-inch extended release with intricate piano work, a horn overdub, and some dance commands from Prince.

== Music video ==
Filmed on June 7, 1986 (Prince's birthday), the music video features a live performance of the song, taken from the one-off set performed in Detroit, Michigan, at the Cobo Arena.

== Track listings ==
- 7-inch vinyl (North America)
1. "Anotherloverholenyohead" – 3:58
2. "Girls & Boys" (edit) – 3:30
- 7-inch vinyl (Europe)
1. "Anotherloverholenyohead" – 3:23
2. "I Wanna Be Your Lover" (edit) – 2:57
- 2×7-inch vinyl (Europe)
1. "Anotherloverholenyohead" – 3:23
2. "I Wanna Be Your Lover" (edit) – 2:57
3. "Mountains" – 3:58
4. "Alexa de Paris" – 3:20
- 12-inch vinyl (North America)
1. "Anotherloverholenyohead" (extended version) – 7:24
2. "Girls & Boys" (LP version) – 5:30
- 12-inch vinyl (Europe)
1. "Anotherloverholenyohead" (extended version) – 7:24
2. "I Wanna Be Your Lover" (LP version) – 5:47

== Personnel ==
Personnel are taken from Duane Tudahl, Benoît Clerc, and Guitarcloud.

- Prince – lead and backing vocals, Roland G-707 electric guitar, Roland GR-700 guitar synthesizer, piano, bass guitar, Linn LM-1, handclaps
- Susannah Melvoin – backing vocals
- Clare Fischer – orchestral arrangements

== Charts ==
Weekly chart performance for "Anotherloverholenyohead"
Chart (1986)	Peak position
Luxembourg (Radio Luxembourg)	25
New Zealand (Recorded Music NZ)	36
UK Singles (OCC)	36
US Billboard Hot 100	63
