= Starfish and Coffee (song) =

Song by Prince

from the album Sign o' the Times
- Released: March 31, 1987
- Recorded: April 19–20, 1986, Galpin Blvd. Home Studio
- Genre: Psychedelia; pop
- Length: 2:51
- Label: Warner Bros.; Paisley Park
- Songwriters: Prince; Susannah Melvoin
- Producer: Prince

"Starfish and Coffee" is a song performed by Prince, and written by him and Susannah Melvoin. It is the sixth track on his 1987 double album Sign o' the Times, and was based on a true story about a girl named Cynthia Rose that went to the same school as Susannah and Wendy Melvoin. Susannah, Prince's girlfriend at the time, would receive a writing credit for the lyrics on the track due to the story that she told of Cynthia.

== Background ==
During the early sessions for what would eventually become Sign o' the Times, Prince and Susannah Melvoin would often tell each other stories of their childhood memories. At one point, Susannah brought forward a story of Cynthia Rose, a girl that she and her twin sister Wendy used to know at their school. Cynthia was often ignored by classmates, but Susannah took a special interest in learning more and more about Cynthia. Whenever Cynthia was asked what she had for breakfast, her response was often "starfish and pee pee". Susannah would further explain this odd answer:

I never understood the combo meal. Furthermore, as a consequence nobody else could. Here it seemed like the deal breaker for most kids. Above all the kids in our class had no interest in how Cynthia came to get her morning breakfast. I considered it tender and funny, and listened to her tell me anything she wanted to say whether it was firmly planted on earth, or from her planet of tender hearted people who love numbers and draw smiley faces.

Prince would become so fascinated with the story that he felt he had to make it into a song, on one condition: the phrase "pee pee" had to be replaced with a different word, which would become "coffee". Susannah agreed, and after writing down what she had told him on a piece of paper, he went to his home studio and began recording the song. To give the song its magical and unusual feel as depicted in the lyrics, harp sounds were created on synthesizers, while Prince's initial drum kit was doubled with a reversed LM-1 drum loop. After spending ten hours recording with engineer Susan Rogers, the latter woke Susannah up to listen to the track, and Prince, with a smile, simply stated "here it is!". The couple both found to have loved it when they listened to it, and it would remain a part of album configurations for Prince's next album until it was eventually released in March of 1987.

== Personnel ==
Credits from Duane Tudahl, Benoît Clerc and Guitarcloud

- Prince – lead and backing vocals, piano, Ensoniq Mirage, Fairlight CMI, electric guitar, bass guitar, drums, Linn LM-1, tambourine
- Susannah Melvoin – backing vocals
