= Around the World in a Day =

Studio album by Prince and the Revolution
- Released: April 22, 1985
- Recorded: February–December 1984
- Studios: Flying Cloud Drive Warehouse (Eden Prairie, Minnesota); Sunset Sound (Hollywood, California); Mobile Audio Studio (outside St. Paul Civic Center Arena, St. Paul, Minnesota, and Flying Cloud Drive Warehouse, Eden Prairie, Minnesota, for "The Ladder"); Capitol (Los Angeles, California); Paisley Park (Minneapolis)
- Genres: Psychedelic pop; pop rock; psychedelic soul; psychedelic funk; psychedelia
- Length: 42:33
- Labels: Paisley Park; Warner Bros.
- Producer: Prince

Prince and the Revolution chronology
Purple Rain (1984)	Around the World in a Day (1985)	Parade (1986)

Singles from Around the World in a Day
- 1. "Raspberry Beret" Released: May 15, 1985; 2. "Paisley Park" Released: May 24, 1985 (EU); 3. "Pop Life" Released: July 15, 1985; 4. "America" Released: October 2, 1985

Around the World in a Day is the seventh studio album by American recording artist Prince, and the third release on which his backing band the Revolution is billed. It was released on April 22, 1985, by Paisley Park Records and Warner Bros. Records. Departing somewhat from the commercial sound of his previous release, the massively successful Purple Rain (1984), the album instead saw Prince experimenting with psychedelic styles and more opulent textures. In compliance with Prince's wishes to "let the project be taken in its entirety before zeroing in on anything", the record company released the album with minimal publicity, withholding accompanying singles until almost a month after the album's release.

Around the World in a Day was released to mixed reception among crossover audiences after the success of Purple Rain, though it nonetheless sold relatively well and became Prince and the Revolution's second number-one album on the Billboard 200. Two of its four singles reached the top 10 of the Billboard Hot 100: "Raspberry Beret" and "Pop Life". Following Prince's death, "Raspberry Beret" re-charted on the Billboard Hot 100 as a top 40 hit, reaching number 33. Around the World in a Day was certified double platinum by the Recording Industry Association of America (RIAA) on July 2, 1985. A remastered reissue was released on November 21, 2025.

== Background ==
Recording for Around the World in a Day began in sessions dating back before that of Purple Rain. Following six months of touring behind that bestselling album, Prince returned to recording. An initial inspiration for the album's sound came in the form of a demo, recorded by David Coleman, the brother of Revolution band member Lisa Coleman, which would ultimately become the title track.

The album pursued a dense, psychedelic style that made use of unconventional instruments and cryptic lyrics. Its sound and album cover painting by Doug Henders (artist) drew numerous comparisons to the Beatles' Sgt. Pepper's Lonely Hearts Club Band album. Prince spoke in an interview about the album's sound and cover, denying inspiration from the Beatles:

"The influence wasn't the Beatles. They were great for what they did, but I don't know how that would hang today. The cover art came about because I thought people were tired of looking at me. Who wants another picture of him? I would only want so many pictures of my woman, then I would want the real thing. What would be a little more happening than just another picture would be if there was some way I could materialize in people's cribs when they play the record. I don't mind [the album being called psychedelic], because that was the only period in recent history that delivered songs and colors. Led Zeppelin, for example, would make you feel differently on each song."

== Reception ==
Professional ratings
Review scores
Source	Rating
AllMusic	3.5/5 stars
Blender	2/5 stars
Chicago Sun-Times	4/4 stars
Entertainment Weekly	C
The Guardian	5/5 stars
Mojo	4/5 stars
Pitchfork	8.8/10
The Rolling Stone Album Guide	2.5/5 stars
Spin Alternative Record Guide	4/10
The Village Voice	B−

Despite the muted promotion and its less commercial sound, the album still had two American top 10 hits, and went double platinum. Initial critical reception was mixed, but retrospective reviews are positive.

According to Prince, George Clinton was a fan of the album.

Greg Tate of Spin wrote, "Perhaps it's inevitable, given a career built as much on calculated mindfucking as mindblowing music, that Prince would choose to follow the best album of his career with the most bewildering, if not the worst."

In a positive retrospective review for Pitchfork, Alan Light described the album as "a brave and deeply personal project, exploring sounds and ideas that were almost shocking coming from a pop icon at his peak." Simon Price wrote for The Guardian that the album "always sounds better than you think it will, when you revisit."

== Track listing ==
=== Original album ===
All tracks are written by Prince, except where noted.

Side one
No.	Title	Writer(s)	Length
1.	"Around the World in a Day"	Prince; John L. Nelson; David Coleman	3:28
2.	"Paisley Park"		4:42
3.	"Condition of the Heart"		6:48
4.	"Raspberry Beret"		3:33
5.	"Tamborine"		2:47
Total length:			21:18

Side two
No.	Title	Writer(s)	Length
6.	"America"		3:42
7.	"Pop Life"		3:43
8.	"The Ladder"	Prince; J. Nelson	5:29
9.	"Temptation"		8:18
Total length:			21:12

== Personnel ==
Adapted from Benoît Clerc, Duane Tudahl, Guitarcloud, Lydia Moran, and RR Auction

=== Musicians ===
==== Prince and the Revolution ====
- Prince – lead and backing vocals (all tracks), spoken vocals (track 9), electric guitar (tracks 2, 6, 9), acoustic guitar (tracks 3–4), bass (tracks 4–7, 9), programming (tracks 1–2, 4, 6, 9), finger cymbals (tracks 2–3, 5), kettledrums (track 3), percussion (track 3), tambourine (track 5), claps (track 5), synthesizers (all tracks), piano (tracks 3, 7–9), whistles (track 5)
- Lisa Coleman – backing vocals (tracks 1–2, 4, 7–8), synthesizers (tracks 6, 8)
- Doctor Fink – backing vocals (track 1), synthesizers (track 6, 8)
- Wendy Melvoin – backing vocals (tracks 2, 4, 7–8), electric guitar (track 6), acoustic guitar (track 1)
- Bobby Z. – backing vocals (track 1), drums (tracks 6, 8), programming (track 1), percussion (track 8)
- Brownmark – backing vocals (track 8), bass (tracks 6, 8)

==== Additional musicians ====
- David Coleman – backing vocals (track 1), cello (tracks 1, 4, 8), oud (track 1), finger cymbals (track 1), darbuka (track 1)
- Jonathan Melvoin – backing vocals (track 1), tambourine (track 1)
- Susannah Melvoin – backing vocals (tracks 1–2, 4, 8)
- Novi Novog – violin (tracks 2, 4)
- Suzie Katayama – cello (tracks 4, 8)
- Brad Marsh – tambourine (track 6)
- Sheila E. – drums (track 7)
- Annette Atkinson, Tim Barr – double bass (track 8)
- Denyse Buffum, Laury Woods – viola (track 8)
- Marcy Dicterow-Vaj, Sid Page – violin (track 8)
- Eddie Mininfield – saxophone (tracks 8–9)
- Taja Sevelle – backing vocals (track 8)

=== Technical ===
- Prince – producer
- Susan Rogers – recording engineer (tracks 1–2, 4–6, 8–9)
- David Leonard – recording engineer (tracks 1, 3, 9)
- Peggy McCreary – recording engineer (tracks 3, 7)
- Robert "Cubby" Colby, David Tickle – recording engineer (tracks 8–9)
- Lisa Coleman, Wendy Melvoin – strings arrangement (tracks 4, 7)
- Bernie Grundman – mastering
- Laura LiPuma – design and assembly
- Doug Henders – cover painting

== Charts ==
=== Weekly charts ===
Weekly chart performance for Around the World in a Day
Chart (1985)	Peak position
Australian Albums (Kent Music Report)	12
Austrian Albums Chart	7
Canadian Albums Chart	16
Dutch Albums Chart	1
Finnish Albums (Suomen virallinen lista)	19
German Albums Chart	10
New Zealand Albums Chart	16
Norwegian Albums Chart	10
Swedish Albums Chart	1
Swiss Albums Chart	8
UK Albums Chart	5
US Billboard 200	1
US Top R&B/Hip-Hop Albums (Billboard)	4

2016 weekly chart performance for Around the World in a Day
Chart (2016)	Peak position
French Albums (SNEP)	134

2025 weekly chart performance for Around the World in a Day
Chart (2025)	Peak position
Belgian Albums (Ultratop Flanders)	18
Belgian Albums (Ultratop Wallonia)	83
Croatian International Albums (HDU)	1
Dutch Albums (Album Top 100)	29
Hungarian Albums (MAHASZ)	28
Japanese Albums (Oricon)	26
Japanese Rock Albums (Oricon)	5
Japanese Top Albums Sales (Billboard Japan)	27
Norwegian Physical Albums (IFPI Norge) 40th Anniversary edition	9

=== Year-end charts ===
Year-end chart performance for Around the World in a Day
Chart (1985)	Position
New Zealand Albums (RMNZ)	40
US Billboard 200	26
US Top R&B/Hip-Hop Albums	18

=== Singles ===
- "Raspberry Beret" (#2 US, #4 US R&B, #25 UK)
1. "Raspberry Beret"
2. "She's Always in My Hair" (US)
3. "Hello" (UK)
- "Paisley Park" (#18 UK) No US release
1. "Paisley Park"
2. "She's Always in My Hair"
- "Pop Life" (#7 US, #8 US R&B, #60 UK)
1. "Pop Life"
2. "Hello" (US)
3. "Girl" (UK)
- "America" (#46 US, #35 US R&B) No UK release
1. "America"
2. "Girl"

== Certifications ==
Certifications for Around the World in a Day
Region	Certification	Certified units/sales
New Zealand (RMNZ)	Gold	7,500^{^}
United Kingdom (BPI)	Gold	100,000^{^}
United States (RIAA)	2× Platinum	2,000,000^{^}
Summaries
Worldwide	—	4,300,000
^{^} Shipments figures based on certification alone.
