= Wendy & Lisa =

American musical duo

- Also known as: Girl Bros.
- Origin: Los Angeles, California, United States
- Genres: Funk; pop; rock
- Years active: 1986–present
- Labels: Columbia; SME; Virgin; EMI; World Domination
- Spinoff of: The Revolution
- Members: Wendy Melvoin; Lisa Coleman
- Website: wendyandlisa.com

Wendy & Lisa (briefly known as Girl Bros.) is a music duo consisting of Wendy Melvoin and Lisa Coleman. They began working with Prince in the early 1980s and were part of his band the Revolution, before branching out on their own and releasing their eponymous debut studio album in 1987. In recent years they have turned their attention to writing music for film and television and have won an Emmy Award.

They have released five studio albums, with their most recent album being 2008's White Flags of Winter Chimneys.

== History ==
=== With the Revolution ===
In 1980, Lisa Coleman replaced Gayle Chapman in Prince's touring band on keyboards and piano. Coleman was asked to contribute vocals to several tracks over his next few albums. In 1983, guitarist Dez Dickerson left the band over religious conflicts. Prince invited Wendy Melvoin (Lisa's girlfriend at the time) into the band as they began to record Purple Rain (1984). The film and album turned Prince and the newly named Revolution into superstars. Prince's personal life also became intertwined with Melvoin's when he began dating her twin sister Susannah.

After Purple Rain (1984), Prince and the Revolution recorded Around the World in a Day (1985) and then Parade (1986), the soundtrack to Prince's film Under the Cherry Moon (1986). In interviews, the two reported they felt they were not getting the recognition and credit they deserved despite their growing contributions to his work. During 1986, Melvoin and Coleman became increasingly disillusioned with Prince's decision to expand the Revolution with non-musicians, such as Wally Safford and Greg Brooks, and Prince's increasing machismo that these new members brought with them. Unhappy and vocal about their feelings, they were eventually convinced to remain with the band through the end of the Hit N Run - Parade Tour. However, Prince felt spurned and as a result he had already decided he would dissolve the Revolution once the tour was complete. Hence, by October 1986, Melvoin and Coleman (along with Bobby Z.) were dismissed by Prince, disrupting the Dream Factory album that was already completed and effectively dissolving The Revolution.

=== As Wendy & Lisa ===
In 1987 the duo released an album simply titled Wendy and Lisa on Columbia Records in the US and on Virgin Records in the UK. The singles released were "Honeymoon Express", "Waterfall" and "Sideshow" but none hit the top 40 on either side of the Atlantic. The follow-up album, Fruit at the Bottom, was released in 1989. The singles released were "Are You My Baby?", "Lolly Lolly" (remixed by Prince) and "Satisfaction", which gave them a top 40 single in the UK. "Waterfall '89" failed to capitalize on the success of "Satisfaction" and reached another minor placing.

In 1990, the duo signed with Virgin Records in the US (which was already their label in Europe) and released Eroica. However, this too met only minor chart success. In 1991, Virgin UK released the remix album Re-mix-In-a-Carnation, a selection of club mixes from the first three albums as remixed by producers like the Orb, William Orbit, and Nellee Hooper.

In the mid-1990s, Wendy & Lisa worked on several movie projects with record producer Trevor Horn. They recorded an album with him as producer, but had a falling out (according to them, due to Horn and his wife Jill Sinclair's alleged homophobia) and the project was shelved, leaving the master tapes in Horn's hands and acrimony between the parties involved.

Their next solo effort – the 1998 album Girl Bros. – was the first to be independently released, with all subsequent releases also self-released.

In 2004, the duo reached a rapprochement with Prince and contributed to several tracks on his Planet Earth (2007) album.

In December 2008, White Flags of Winter Chimneys was released. The title is taken from a line in the Joni Mitchell song "Hejira". 2011 saw the release of the Snapshots EP, the CD version of which came as limited edition of 425 copies accompanied by an A5 sized photo book which was signed (with individual doodles) by both artists. It is a 6-track collection of songs that were recorded over the preceding 20 years of their careers but had previously never been released.

=== Session and scoring work ===
Melvoin and Coleman have done session work and/or written songs with Seal, k.d. lang, Joni Mitchell, Meshell Ndegeocello, Pearl Jam, Terence Trent D'Arby, Lisa Germano, Lisa Marie Presley, Liz Phair, Michael Penn, Grace Jones, Tricky, the Three O'Clock, Uh Huh Her, Sheryl Crow, Victoria Williams, Rob Thomas, Gwen Stefani, Skye Edwards, Scritti Politti, Nerina Pallot, OK Go, Madonna, The Like, Nina Gordon, fDeluxe, the Family, Doyle Bramhall II, Nikka Costa, André Cymone, Kate Earl, Eric Clapton, Bettye LaVette, Ilse DeLange, Mac Miller, and Walk the Moon. Their vocals were featured on the soundtrack for Toys (1992).

Their first scoring project was for Dangerous Minds (1995). The team has scored numerous TV shows and films, including popular TV shows like Crossing Jordan, Heroes, Nurse Jackie and Firefly Lane.

== Awards ==
Wendy & Lisa technically share the honor of winners of a Grammy and Oscar for being part of the Revolution, as Purple Rain (1984) won two Grammys, and the Oscar for Best Original Score. In 2010, they received the Emmy Award for Outstanding Original Main Title Theme Music for their work on Nurse Jackie. They received the ASCAP award for Composers of the Year for their work on Dangerous Minds (1995), the theme to HBO's Carnivàle, Crossing Jordan and Heroes. They were nominated for an Emmy in 2012 for the main title theme for the Fox show Touch.

== Other projects ==
Melvoin and Coleman have made numerous contributions to television themes. They wrote theme music and background scores for TV shows such as Shades of Blue, Crossing Jordan, Bionic Woman, Carnivàle, Heroes, Mercy and Showtime's Nurse Jackie.

In 2001 they worked with Neil Finn on his second solo album, One Nil.

They have also been featured on several film scores and soundtracks, including Dangerous Minds (1995), Hav Plenty (1997), Something New (2006), and Wine Country (2019). The film Toys (1992) featured their song "The Closing of the Year" as its main theme, and they also produced the full-length Heroes: Original Score, released in April 2009, composed entirely of their full-length compositions for each of the show's characters. They scored the TV series Touch created by Crossing Jordan and Heroes creator, Tim Kring.

Melvoin and Coleman collaborated with Grace Jones for her 2008 album Hurricane.

== Discography ==
=== Studio albums ===
- Wendy and Lisa (1987), Columbia Records (UK No. 84)
- Fruit at the Bottom (1989), Columbia Records (UK No. 45)
- Eroica (1990), Virgin Records (UK No. 33)
- Girl Bros. (1998), World Domination – Re-released as Wendy & Lisa "Girl Brothers Inc." (1999) (self-released)
- White Flags of Winter Chimneys (2008), W. Melvoin/L. Coleman (self-released)

=== Compilation albums ===
- Re-Mix-in-a-Carnation (1991)
- Are You My Baby (1996)
- Always in My Dreams (2000)

=== Extended plays ===
- Snapshots (2011) (self-released)

=== Soundtracks ===
- Toys (1992), Geffen Records
- Heroes: Original Score (2009), La-La Land Records
- Nurse Jackie: Season One Soundtrack (2010), Lionsgate Music
- Dirty Girl Original Motion Picture Soundtrack (2010), Lakeshore Music
- Outer Range: Season Two Original Series Soundtrack (2024), Milan Records

=== Singles ===
List of singles, with selected chart positions
Year	Title	Peak positions					Album
Year	Title	US	BEL (FL)	ITA	NLD	UK	Album
1987	"Waterfall"	56	15	13	17	66	Wendy and Lisa
1988	"Sideshow"	—	40	25	34	49	Wendy and Lisa
1988	"Honeymoon Express"	—	—	—	—	—	Wendy and Lisa
1989	"Are You My Baby?"	—	13	25	12	70	Fruit at the Bottom
1989	"Lolly Lolly"	—	16	—	8	64	Fruit at the Bottom
1989	"Satisfaction"	—	—	—	—	27	Fruit at the Bottom
1989	"Waterfall '89"	—	—	—	—	69	single only
1990	"Strung Out"	—	42	—	31	44	Eroica
1990	"Rainbow Lake"	—	—	—	—	70	Eroica
1991	"Don't Try to Tell Me"	—	—	—	—	83	Eroica
1995	"This Is the Life"	—	—	—	—	—	Dangerous Minds Soundtrack
"—" denotes releases that did not chart or were not released.

== Contributions to Prince discography ==
The following songs, which appear on releases by Prince or associates, are registered with ASCAP as partial Wendy & Lisa compositions:

- "17 Days", written by Prince, Wendy, Lisa, Dr. Fink
- "America", written by Prince, Wendy, Lisa, Brown Mark, Dr. Fink, Bobby Z.
- "A Million Miles (I Love You)", written by Prince, Lisa
- "Computer Blue", written by Prince, Wendy, Lisa, Dr. Fink, John L. Nelson
- "Mountains", written by Prince, Wendy, Lisa (US #23/UK #45)
- "Power Fantastic", written by Prince, Wendy, Lisa
- "Sometimes It Snows in April", written by Prince, Wendy, Lisa
