= Arc Angels =

American band

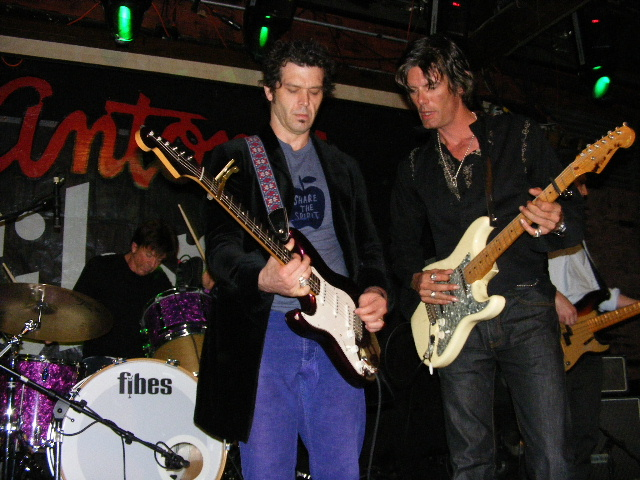
- ARC Angels at Antone's in Austin, TX - South by Southwest (2009). Chris Layton, Doyle Bramhall II, Charlie Sexton (L - R).

Background information
- Origin: Austin, Texas, United States
- Genres: Blues-rock, Texas blues, Southern rock
- Years active: 1990–1993, 2009–2010, 2022-Present (occasional appearances: 2002-2009)
- Label: Geffen
- Members: Doyle Bramhall II; Charlie Sexton; Chris Layton
- Past members: Tommy Shannon
- Website: arcangelsmusic.net

Arc Angels is a blues rock supergroup formed in Austin, Texas in the early 1990s. The band featured drummer Chris Layton and bassist Tommy Shannon (both of Stevie Ray Vaughan’s band Double Trouble), along with singer-guitarists Doyle Bramhall II and Charlie Sexton (both friends of Vaughan). The group formed shortly after Vaughan's death. The "Arc" in the band's name comes from the Austin Rehearsal Complex where the band first started jamming. They were initially active 1990 to 1993, and have reformed several times subsequently but Shannon has not participated since 2009.

== History ==
Arc Angels, their 1992 debut album, met with critical approval and reached No.127 on the Billboard chart. The band made its network television debut on Late Night with David Letterman on June 9, 1992, performing "Living In A Dream." Arc Angels played Letterman again on January 6, 1993, with "Too Many Ways to Fall."

Bramhall's heroin addiction as well as internal friction caused the breakup of the band in 1993. The Arc Angels broke up in October of that year after concluding with a series of farewell concerts at Austin's Backyard Outdoor Venue. The band reunited for occasional live performances beginning in 2002.

In recent years, Bramhall played guitar and toured with Eric Clapton's band as well as Roger Waters. Charlie Sexton toured with Bob Dylan. Layton and Shannon have recorded three albums with the Texas soul quintet Storyville. The duo has also backed such artists as Buddy Guy, Kenny Wayne Shepherd and John Mayer.

The members of Arc Angels (minus Shannon) announced that they would be reuniting in March 2009, releasing a live album and DVD of a concert from 2005, touring extensively and beginning work on their second album. The album/DVD Living in a Dream was released in 2009. It contained live renditions of previously released Arc Angels songs, new songs performed live, and three new studio tracks. The launch of the Angels tour took place at Austin's annual South by Southwest Festival. Although the band never officially broke up again, members pursued solo projects and no talks about future Arc Angels releases or concerts have taken place to date. While on stage in 2014, Bramhall referred to the Arc Angels as "this band I was in" further confirming their demise.

As of 2022, the band is performing once again with shows throughout the year.

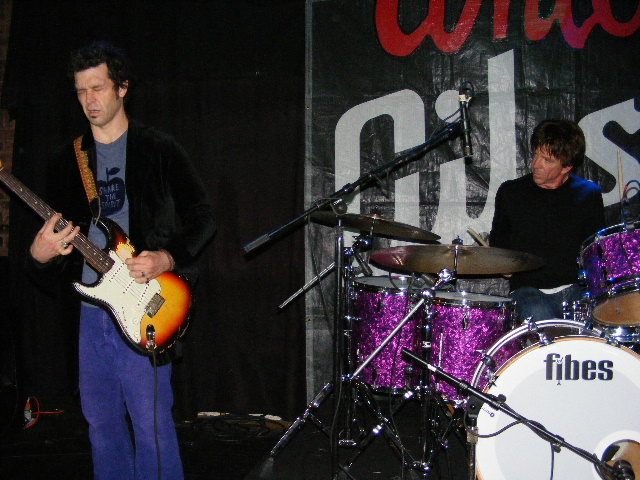
ARC Angels (2009)

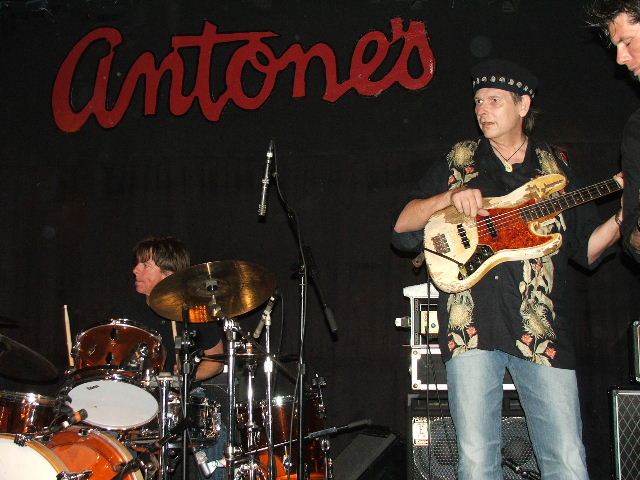
ARC Angels (2006)

== Members ==
=== Current members ===
- Doyle Bramhall II - guitar, vocals (1990-1993, 2005-2010, 2022-Present)
- Charlie Sexton - guitar, vocals (1990-1993, 2005-2010, 2022-Present)
- Chris Layton - drums (1990-1993, 2005-2010, 2022-Present)

=== Former Members ===
- Tommy Shannon - bass (1990-1993, 2005-2009)

=== Touring Members ===
- Dave Monsey, aka "Mark Newmark" - bass (2009-2010). Dave reportedly used an alias during the tour to avoid a contract violation
- Eric Holden - bass (2022–Present)

== Discography ==
- Arc Angels (Geffen Records, 1992) US No. 127
- Living in a Dream CD/DVD (2009)
