= Arc Angels (album) =

- Original album artwork by Mark Ryden

Studio album by Arc Angels
- Released: 1992
- Recorded: 1992
- Genre: Rock; pop; blues
- Length: 60:44
- Label: Geffen
- Producer: Little Steven

Professional ratings
Review scores
Source	Rating
AllMusic	4/5 stars
Rolling Stone	3/5 stars

Arc Angels is the debut album by the American band Arc Angels, released in 1992.

== Track listing ==
1. "Living in a Dream" (Doyle Bramhall II, Charlie Sexton) – 4:54
2. "Paradise Cafe" (Charlie Sexton, Tonio K) - 5:14
3. "Sent by Angels" (Doyle Bramhall II) – 5:44
4. "Sweet Nadine" (Charlie Sexton, Tonio K) – 4:31
5. "Good Time" (Doyle Bramhall II, Sammy Piazza) – 4:47
6. "See What Tomorrow Brings" (Doyle Bramhall II) – 6:27
7. "Always Believed in You" (Charlie Sexton, Tonio K) – 4:55
8. "The Famous Jane" (Charlie Sexton, Tonio K) – 4:31
9. "Spanish Moon" (Doyle Bramhall II, Charlie Sexton, Chris Layton) – 5:48
10. "Carry Me On" (Doyle Bramhall II) – 4:09
11. "Shape I'm In" (Doyle Bramhall II, Charlie Sexton, Marc Benno) – 4:07
12. "Too Many Ways to Fall" (Chris Layton, Tommy Shannon, Charlie Sexton, Tonio K) – 5:52

== Personnel ==
- Doyle Bramhall II - guitar, vocals
- Charlie Sexton - guitar, vocals
- Chris Layton - drums
- Tommy Shannon - bass
- Ian McLagan - keyboards

== Production ==
- Produced by Little Steven
- Engineered by Dave McNair
