= One Nil =

Studio album by Neil Finn
- Released: March 9, 2001
- Genre: Rock, alternative rock
- Length: One Nil: 48:46; One All: 49:00
- Label: Parlophone
- Producer: Tchad Blake; Neil Finn; Mitchell Froom

Neil Finn chronology
Sessions at West 54th (2000)	One Nil (2001)	7 Worlds Collide (2001)

Alternate release
- Released in United States as One All.

Professional ratings
Review scores
Source	Rating
Allmusic	4/5 stars
Rolling Stone	(favorable)
Tiny Mix Tapes	4/5 stars

One Nil, released in 2001, is the second solo album by New Zealand singer-songwriter, Neil Finn. When released in the United States the following year, the album had a slightly different track listing and was issued under the name One All.

== Overview ==
Following the release of his debut solo effort Try Whistling This in 1998, singer-songwriter Neil Finn followed up by releasing the less adventurous album One Nil in 2001. The album features guest musicians Sheryl Crow, Lisa Germano and Crowded House's album producer Mitchell Froom. The album was released in the United States fourteen months after its initial New Zealand, United Kingdom and Australian release with the altered title One All and also contained an altered track listing, featuring four remixed songs and added the songs "Lullaby Requiem" and "Human Kindness", replacing "Elastic Heart" and "Don't Ask Why".

== Track listings ==
All songs were written by Neil Finn, except where noted.

=== One Nil ===
1. "The Climber" – 4:13
2. "Rest of the Day Off" (Finn, Wendy Melvoin, Tchad Blake) – 3:49
3. "Hole in the Ice" (Finn, Lisa Coleman) – 4:11
4. "Wherever You Are" – 4:46
5. "Last to Know" (Finn, Melvoin) – 3:02
6. "Don't Ask Why" (Finn, Melvoin) – 3:54
7. "Secret God" (Finn, Melvoin) – 5:27
8. "Turn and Run" – 3:46
9. "Elastic Heart" – 4:00
10. "Anytime" – 3:24
11. "Driving Me Mad" – 3:58
12. "Into the Sunset" – 4:12

=== One All ===
Tracks 1 and 9 ("The Climber" and "Turn and Run") contained an alternative mix to the One Nil version. Tracks 2 and 3 ("Driving Me Mad" and "Hole in the Ice") were remixed by Bob Clearmountain.

1. "The Climber" (New mix) – 4:15
2. "Driving Me Mad" (Bob Clearmountain mix) – 3:56
3. "Hole in the Ice" (Bob Clearmountain mix) – 4:06
4. "Last to Know" – 2:59
5. "Wherever You Are" – 4:42
6. "Secret God" – 5:24
7. "Lullaby Requiem" – 3:44
8. "Human Kindness" – 4:41
9. "Turn and Run" (New mix) – 3:41
10. "Anytime" – 3:23
11. "Rest of the Day Off" – 3:57
12. "Into the Sunset" – 4:12

== Personnel ==
- Neil Finn – guitar, vocals, high bass, piano, guitar synthesiser, orchestra bells, Wurlitzer electric piano, vibes, harmonium, bass, Chamberlin strings
- Wendy Melvoin – E-Bow fuzz guitar, chorus on "The Climber", drums, low bass, guitar, bass, percussion, backing vocals, shaker
- Jim Moginie – ukulele, guitar, fuzz guitar
- Lisa Germano – chorus on "The Climber", violin
- Suzanna Melvoin – chorus on "The Climber"
- Doyle – chorus on "The Climber"
- Tchad Blake – Groove box
- Mitchell Froom – Penny owsley, keyboards, Hammond organ, Chamberlin, Wurlitzer electric piano, piano, celeste
- Lisa Coleman – keyboards, backing vocals
- JJ Johnson – drums
- Liam Finn – backing vocals
- Sharon Finn – backing vocals
- Jim Keltner – drums
- Edmund McWilliams – backing vocals
- Sheryl Crow – vocals, accordion
- Sam Gibson – drum programming, programming

== Charts ==
Chart (2001)	Peak position
Australian Albums (ARIA)	9
New Zealand Albums (RMNZ)	29

== Certifications ==
Region	Certification	Certified units/sales
Australia (ARIA)	Gold	35,000^{^}
^{^} Shipments figures based on certification alone.
