= Doyle Bramhall II =

American guitarist

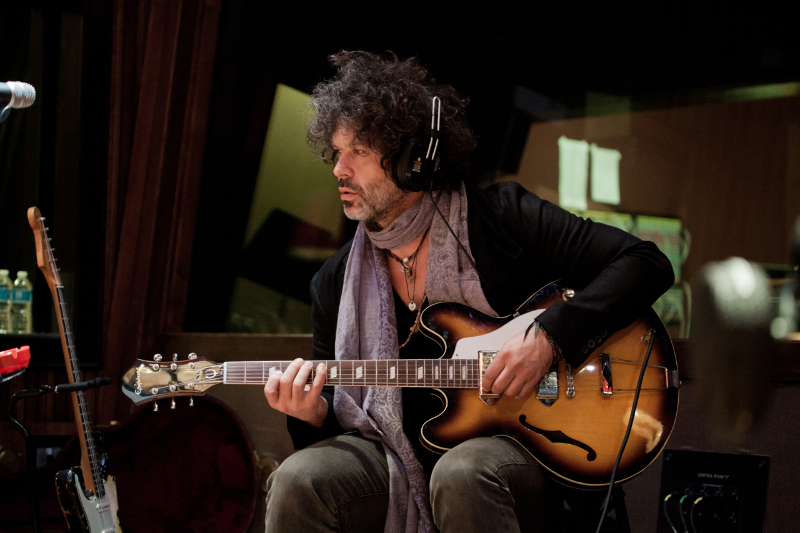

Background information
- Born: December 24, 1968 (age 57); Dallas, Texas
- Genres: Blues; rock and roll; soul
- Occupations: Musician; songwriter; producer
- Instruments: Guitar; vocals; drums
- Years active: 1984–present
- Website: db2music.com

Doyle Bramhall II (born December 24, 1968) is an American guitarist, producer and songwriter best known for his work with Eric Clapton and Roger Waters. He is the son of the songwriter and drummer Doyle Bramhall.

== Early life ==
Bramhall was born in Texas and lived half of his life in Northern California. His father, Doyle Bramhall Sr., played drums for the legendary bluesmen Lightnin' Hopkins and Freddie King and was a lifelong collaborator with his childhood friends Stevie Ray Vaughan and Jimmie Vaughan.

== Career ==
When Bramhall was 18, he toured with Jimmie Vaughan's band the Fabulous Thunderbirds.

He co-founded the blues rock band Arc Angels with Charlie Sexton and members from Stevie Ray Vaughan's rhythm section, Chris Layton and Tommy Shannon.

He released his first solo album Doyle Bramhall II in 1996.

Bramhall received phone calls from both Roger Waters and Eric Clapton following the 1999 release of Jellycream. Bramhall joined Waters on his In the Flesh tour, playing guitar and providing background and lead vocals. His performances were recorded on the subsequent live album and DVD In the Flesh – Live. Bramhall also played guitar on Clapton's Riding With the King, a collaboration with B.B. King. This album included Clapton's and King's songs and covers of blues songs (including two Bramhall-penned tracks originally from Jellycream.)

Bramhall released Welcome with his new band Smokestack in 2001. The album's lead single "Green Light Girl" was somewhat of a hit in the blues world. Bramhall and Smokestack released a live DVD entitled Live at the Great Wall of China in 2006. Two audio tracks from the DVD were released on iTunes as Doyle Bramhall II (Live at the Great Wall of China).

Bramhall has collaborated with artists such as T Bone Burnett, Elton John, Derek Trucks, Susan Tedeschi, Gary Clark Jr., Gregg Allman, Dr. John, Allen Toussaint, Billy Preston, Erykah Badu, Questlove and Meshell Ndegeocello.

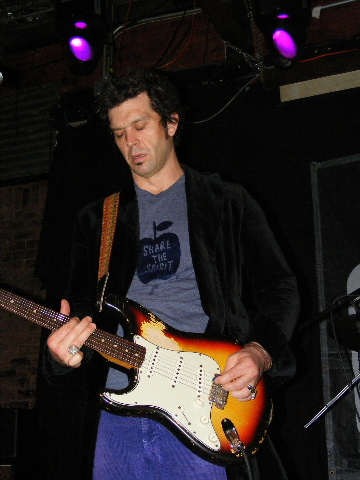
Bramhall II in 2009

Bramhall has produced several records including Sheryl Crow's 100 Miles from Memphis. He also joined her on a tour in 2011.

He was featured in the 2006 music industry documentary Before the Music Dies.

Bramhall co-produced Eric Clapton's 2013 release Old Sock and played guitars on his 2014 release The Breeze: An Appreciation of JJ Cale. He joined Clapton on his 50th anniversary tour as an opening act and backing musician. He appeared at Clapton's Crossroads Guitar Festival and was recorded for the subsequent live album and DVD. Bramhall played lead guitars on Elton John's 2013 album The Diving Board.

He played with the Tedeschi Trucks Band and Sharon Jones & the Dap Kings on the "Wheels of Soul" tour across the United States in 2015. He performed both as an opening act and as a rhythm guitarist in the Tedeschi Trucks Band, performing songs ranging from his days with the Arc Angels to unreleased songs.

He performed a tribute concert to honor Joe Cocker along with the Tedeschi Trucks Band and alumni from the 1970 Joe Cocker Mad Dogs and Englishmen Tour including Leon Russell, Rita Coolidge, Bobby Torres, Claudia Lennear, Chuck Blackwell, Pamela Polland, Daniel Moore, Matthew Moore, Chris Stainton, and photographer Linda Wolf in 2015. He also performed at the Mahindra Blues Festival in India alongside Buddy Guy and Quinn Sullivan in 2015.

Bramhall released his fourth studio album, titled Rich Man on September 30, 2016. This album consists of 12 originals and a cover of Jimi Hendrix's "Hear My Train A Comin'".

Bramhall signed with the Mascot Label Group in 2018 with expectations for a new album in the fall. Entitled Shades, the album was planned to be released on October 5, 2018, following the lead single "Everything You Need", a duet with Eric Clapton. In addition to Clapton the album was to feature collaborations with Norah Jones, Greyhounds, and Tedeschi Trucks Band.

In 2022, the Arc Angels reformed for a small tour of the southern United States.

In 2023, Bramhall took part in a tribute concert to Jeff Beck over two nights (May 22 and 23) at the Royal Albert Hall alongside Eric Clapton, Rod Stewart, Ronnie Wood, Gary Clark Jnr, Joss Stone and many others.

== Style ==
Bramhall is one of the many lefthand guitarists who plays with his instrument strung upside-down. He plays left-handed but the instrument is strung upside-down with the high E on the top. This unusual arrangement of the strings gives his playing a unique sound because he bends the strings by pulling them downwards rather than upwards, the customary approach. Others who have bent strings in this direction include Elizabeth Cotten, Albert King, Eric Gales, Otis Rush, Barbara Lynn, Coco Montoya, Edgard Scandurra, Dick Dale, and the late blues guitarist Jeff Healey (who played with his instrument flat on his lap for stability and increased string flexibility).

== Personal life ==
Bramhall was married to American singer/songwriter Susannah Melvoin, with whom he had two children. The couple separated in 2010. Their subsequent divorce proceedings were characterized in the tabloids as being "messy," due in part to Bramhall's relationship with American actress and fellow Texan Renée Zellweger, which started in 2012 before the divorce was settled.

== Discography ==
=== Studio albums ===
- 1996 – Doyle Bramhall II
- 1999 – Jellycream
- 2001 – Welcome
- 2016 – Rich Man
- 2018 – Shades
- 2023 – Doyle Bramhall II/DJ Harrison/Daru Jones - When The Music's Over (J.M.I. Recordings)

=== Featured on/as credited ===
- 1988 – Stu Blank – Under the Big Top
- 1990 – Marc Benno – Take It Back To Texas
- 1992 – Arc Angels – Arc Angels
- 1993 – Toni Price – Swim Away
- 1994 – Marc Benno – Snake Charmer
- 1998 – N'Dea Davenport – N'Dea Davenport
- 1999 – Richie Kotzen – Break It All Down
- 1999 – Marty Grebb – Smooth Sailin'
- 1999 – Meshell Ndegéocello – Bitter
- 2000 – B.B. King & Eric Clapton – Riding with the King
- 2000 – Roger Waters – In the Flesh – Live
- 2000 – Indigenous – Circle
- 2001 – Eric Clapton – Reptile
- 2001 – Double Trouble – Been a Long Time
- 2001 – Neil Finn – One Nil
- 2001 – Jennifer Warnes – The Well
- 2002 – Roger Waters – Flickering Flame: The Solo Years Vol. 1
- 2002 – Sheryl Crow – C'mon, C'mon
- 2002 – Lisa Marie Presley – To Whom It May Concern
- 2003 – Boyd Tinsley – True Reflections
- 2003 – Meshell Ndegéocello
- 2003 – Comfort Woman
- 2003 – Jack Casady – Dream Factor
- 2003 – B.B. King – Reflections
- 2003 – Chris Botti – A Thousand Kisses Deep
- 2004 – Eric Clapton – Me and Mr. Johnson
- 2004 – Eric Clapton – Sessions for Robert J
- 2004 – C.C. Adcock – Lafayette Marquis
- 2005 – Eric Clapton – Back Home
- 2005 – Bettye LaVette – I've Got My Own Hell to Raise
- 2005 – Susan Tedeschi – Hope and Desire
- 2005 – Various Artists – Our New Orleans: A Benefit Album for the Gulf Coast
- 2005 – Nerina Pallot – Fires
- 2005 – JJ Cale & Eric Clapton – The Road to Escondido
- 2006 – John Legend – Once Again
- 2007 – Miles Davis – Evolution of the Groove
- 2007 – Soundtrack – I'm Not There
- 2007 – Meshell Ndegéocello – The World Has Made Me the Man of My Dreams
- 2008 – Michael McDonald – Soul Speak
- 2008 – Amos Lee – Last Days at the Lodge
- 2008 – Susan Tedeschi – Back to the River
- 2008 – Rodney Crowell – Sex and Gasoline
- 2008 – Baby Animals – Il Grande Silenzio
- 2009 – Taylor Hicks – The Distance
- 2009 – The Derek Trucks Band – Already Free
- 2009 – Arc Angels – Living in a Dream
- 2010 – Robert Randolph and the Family Band – We Walk This Road
- 2010 – Eric Clapton – Clapton
- 2010 – Elton John/Leon Russell – The Union
- 2010 – Sheryl Crow – 100 Miles from Memphis
- 2011 – Gregg Allman – Low Country Blues
- 2011 – fDeluxe – Gaslight
- 2012 – Soundtrack – The Music of Nashville: Season 1
- 2012 – Willie Nelson – Heroes
- 2013 – Tedeschi Trucks Band – Made Up Mind
- 2013 – Paul Allen & The Underthinkers – Everywhere at Once
- 2013 – Elton John – The Diving Board
- 2013 – Eric Clapton – Old Sock
- 2014 – Johnny Hallyday – Le Cœur D'Un Homme
- 2014 – Eric Clapton – The Breeze: An Appreciation of JJ Cale
- 2014 – Meshell Ndegéocello – Comet, Come to Me
- 2014 – Jerry Lee Lewis – Rock & Roll Time
- 2014 – Ruthie Foster – Promise of a Brand New Day
- 2015 – James McMurtry – Complicated Game
- 2015 – Bettye LaVette – Worthy
- 2015 – David Ryan Harris – Lightyears
- 2015 – Paul Young – Tomb of Memories (The CBS Years 1982–1994)
- 2015 – Buddy Guy – Born to Play Guitar
- 2016 – Tedeschi Trucks Band – Let Me Get By
- 2016 – Eric Clapton – Live in San Diego
- 2016 – Eric Clapton – Crossroads Revisited: Selections from the Crossroads Guitar Festivals
- 2017 – Sheryl Crow – Be Myself
- 2017 – Grainne Duffy – Where I Belong
- 2018 – Meshell Ndegéocello – Ventriloquism
- 2018 – Boz Scaggs – Out of the Blues
- 2018 – Ann Wilson – Immortal
- 2019 – Gary Clark Jr. – This Land
- 2019 – Tedeschi Trucks Band – Signs
- 2019 – Reese Wynans – Sweet Release
- 2019 – Robbie Robertson – Sinematic
- 2021 – Tedeschi Trucks Band - Layla Revisited (Live at LOCKN')
- 2022 – Edgar Winter – Brother Johnny
