= Jonathan Melvoin =

American musician (1961–1996)

- Melvoin in the music video for the Smashing Pumpkins song "Zero"

Background information
- Born: Jonathan David Melvoin; December 6, 1961; Los Angeles, California, U.S.
- Died: July 12, 1996 (aged 34) New York City, U.S.
- Genres: Alternative rock; pop
- Occupation: Musician
- Instruments: Keyboards; piano; drums; percussion; vocals
- Years active: 1980s–1996

Jonathan David Melvoin (December 6, 1961 – July 12, 1996) was an American musician, active in the 1980s and 1990s.

== Early life ==
He was the son of Constance (née Ives) and Mike Melvoin, keyboardist for the Wrecking Crew, and brother of twins Susannah and Wendy Melvoin of Prince and the Revolution. He first learned to play drums at the age of five.

== Career ==
Melvoin performed with many punk bands in the 1990s, such as the Dickies. He was also a member of the Family, a Prince side project band that produced the original recording of "Nothing Compares 2 U", "Screams of Passion" and "Mutiny", and made musical contributions to many Wendy & Lisa projects, as well as to Prince and the Revolution's 1985 album Around the World in a Day. He also played drums on "Do U Lie?" from the 1986 Prince and the Revolution album Parade. At the time of his death he was the touring keyboardist for the Smashing Pumpkins during their worldwide tour for the album Mellon Collie and the Infinite Sadness.

== Death ==
Melvoin died at age 34 as the result of a heroin overdose. Melvoin injected high purity heroin that was intended for snorting. He had previously consumed alcohol, which can lower the body's drug tolerance. The Smashing Pumpkins were not invited to Melvoin's funeral. Pumpkins drummer Jimmy Chamberlin injected the same heroin that night, but survived to be arrested for possession. Several songs were inspired by Melvoin's death, including the Sarah McLachlan song "Angel", the Wendy & Lisa song "Jonathan" (as Girl Bros.), and Prince's "The Love We Make" from the album Emancipation.
