= Lisa Coleman (musician) =

American keyboardist and composer (born 1960)

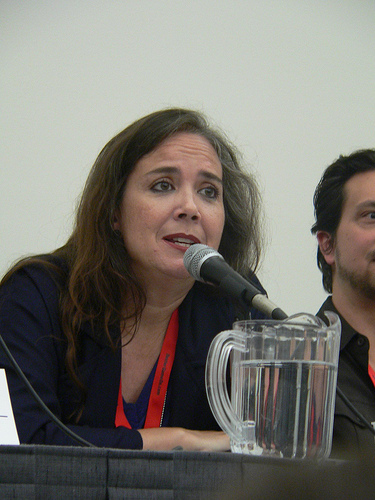
- Coleman in 2010

Background information
- Born: August 17, 1960 (age 66)
- Origin: Los Angeles, California, U.S.
- Genres: Rock; funk; pop; new wave; Minneapolis sound; R&B
- Occupations: Musician; composer; songwriter
- Instruments: Keyboards; piano; vocals
- Years active: 1972–present
- Labels: Columbia, SME, Virgin, EMI, World Domination
- Member of: The Revolution, Wendy & Lisa
- Spouse: Renata Kanclerz (m. 2004)
- Partner: Wendy Melvoin (1981–2002)
- Website: thelisacoleman.com

Lisa Coleman (born August 17, 1960) is an American keyboardist, composer, musician and singer-songwriter. Coleman is known for her tenure as a member of Prince's backing band The Revolution from 1980 to 1986, as well as Wendy & Lisa, her musical partnership with fellow Revolution alum Wendy Melvoin.

== Early life ==
Coleman, the middle child of three, was born in Los Angeles, California. Her mother was Mexican-American visual artist Marylou Ynda-Ciletti (April 4, 1936 – November 17, 2013). Coleman's father, Gary Coleman (born 1936), is an Anglo-American session musician. In the 1960s and 1970s, he was part of the collective The Wrecking Crew and Gary befriended fellow musician Mike Melvoin. Their families became close with each other and often played and recorded music together. Lisa Coleman formed a close relationship with Melvoin's daughter Wendy, saying once "We've been familiar with one another since we were in diapers".

== Career ==
Coleman got her professional start at age 12, playing keyboards in the bubblegum pop band Waldorf Salad. The band, which also featured her siblings and Jonathan Melvoin, was signed to A&M Records in 1973.

In 1975, Coleman played a small role as a high school pianist in the Linda Blair made-for-TV film Sarah T. – Portrait of a Teenage Alcoholic.

Coleman was a recent high school graduate, working as a shipping clerk and teaching piano, when friend Niki Yoergler, who was working as a secretary for Prince's personal manager, Steve Fargnoli, brought Coleman to the attention of Prince. After some convincing on both ends, Yoergler got Coleman an audition and she was hired as part of Prince's backing group in 1980 for his Dirty Mind album and tour. She replaced keyboardist Gayle Chapman, and Wendy Melvoin would soon replace Dez Dickerson.

Coleman played keyboards for Prince on his Controversy and 1999 albums, providing vocals on the latter, as well as the three albums she played as an official member of The Revolution: Purple Rain, Around the World in a Day and Parade. She was also featured as a session player on recordings by The Time and Vanity 6, two side projects of Prince.

Shortly after the completion of Prince and The Revolution's Parade project, Prince started a new band, and Coleman and Melvoin started working together as a duo. As Wendy & Lisa (and for one album, Girl Bros.), they released five full-length albums for various labels, including Columbia/Sony and Virgin, as well as their own independent imprint. Coleman and Melvoin also worked as a collaborative team as film and television composers; their credits include Crossing Jordan and Heroes, both created and produced by Tim Kring under his Tailwind Productions banner; Nurse Jackie, which won them an Emmy for Outstanding Main Title Theme; Prime Suspect; No Tomorrow; Witches of East End; and Touch for which they received an Emmy nomination. They also composed the music for NBC's Shades of Blue.

In 2009, Coleman played vibraphone on the Alice in Chains' song "Black Gives Way to Blue", from the album of the same name.

In 2019, Coleman self-released her first solo instrumental album titled Collage.

== Personal life ==
In April 2009, Coleman gave an interview with Out magazine, where she spoke openly about her past romantic relationship with Wendy Melvoin. Coleman and Melvoin were in a long-term relationship, and continued their collaboration after their romantic relationship ended.

== Awards and recognition ==
Coleman and Melvoin were awarded with an Emmy for Outstanding Original Main Title in 2010 for their theme to Nurse Jackie. Coleman (and Melvoin) also share the honor of winners of a Grammy and Oscar for being part of The Revolution, as Purple Rain won two Grammys, and the Oscar for Best Original Score.

Coleman (along with Melvoin) received the inaugural ASCAP Shirley Walker Award in 2014. The Shirley Walker Award honors those whose achievements have contributed to the diversity of film and television music.

== Discography ==
With Prince

- Dirty Mind (1980)
- Controversy (1981)
- 1999 (1982)
- Sign o' the Times (1987)
- Planet Earth (2007)
- Piano and a Microphone 1983 (as composer) (2018)

With Prince & the Revolution

- Purple Rain (1984)
- Around the World in a Day (1985)
- Parade (1986)

Prince associates

- The Time, The Time (1981)
- Apollonia 6, Apollonia 6 (1984)
- André Cymone, A.C. (1985)
- Jill Jones, Jill Jones (1987)

With Wendy & Lisa

- Wendy and Lisa (1987)
- Fruit at the Bottom (1989)
- Eroica (1990)
- Girl Bros. (as Girl Bros.) (1998)
- White Flags of Winter Chimneys (2008)
- Snapshots EP (2011)

Soundtracks

- Toys (1992)
- Dangerous Minds (1995)
- Crossing Jordan (2003)
- Carnivàle (2004)
- Heroes: Original Score (2008)

Solo work

- Collage (2019)

Session work

- Joni Mitchell, Chalk Mark in a Rain Storm (1989)
- Michael Penn, March (1989)
- Seal, Seal II (1994)
- Nona Gaye, Inner City Blues: The Music of Marvin Gaye (1995)
- Doyle Bramhall II, Doyle Bramhall II (1996)
- Me'Shell NdegéOcello, Peace Beyond Passion (1996)
- k.d. lang, Drag (1997)
- Victoria Williams, Musings of a Creek Dipper (1997)
- Tricky, "Broken Homes" / "Money Greedy" (1998)
- Seal, Human Being (1998)
- Latin Playboys, Dose (1999)
- Doyle Bramhall II, Jellycream (1999)
- Me'Shell NdegéOcello, Bitter (1999)
- Los Lobos, El Cancionero: Mas y Mas (2000)
- Neil Finn, Hole in the Ice (2001)
- Neil Finn, One Nil (2001)
- Neil Finn, One All (2002)
- Hugh Harris, Flowers (2002)
- Gwen Stefani, Love. Angel. Music. Baby. (2004)
- Bettye LaVette, I've Got My Own Hell to Raise (2005)
- Shenkar, Open the Door (2007)
- Alice in Chains, Black Gives Way to Blue (2009)
- Carrie Underwood, Play On (2009)
- Carmen Rizzo, Looking Through Leaves (2010)
- fDeluxe, Gaslight (2011)
- Grace Jones, Hurricane (2011)
- Joe Satriani, Shapeshifting (2020)
