= Susannah Melvoin =

American musician (born 1964)

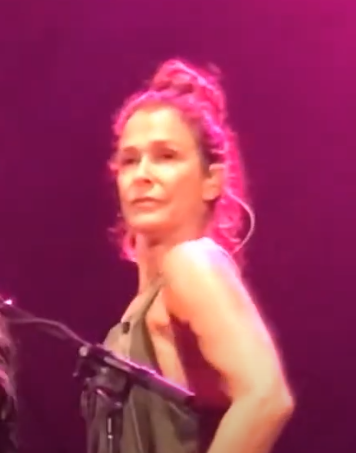

Background information
- Born: January 26, 1964 (age 61)
- Origin: Los Angeles, California, U.S.
- Genres: Rock; funk; pop; new wave; Minneapolis sound; R&B
- Occupations: Vocalist; songwriter
- Instrument: Vocals
- Years active: 1984–present

Susannah Melvoin (born January 26, 1964) is an American vocalist and songwriter. Melvoin is best known for her association with Prince in the mid-1980s. Melvoin comes from a musical family and is the twin sister of musician Wendy Melvoin, sister of Jonathan Melvoin (former touring keyboardist with the Smashing Pumpkins), and daughter of jazz pianist (and former NARAS president) Michael Melvoin.

== Work with Prince ==
Melvoin got her start working with Prince in the mid-1980s during sister Wendy's stint with the Revolution. During this period, Melvoin was tapped to be a joint lead vocalist of one of Prince's side projects, the Family. Prince wrote the Family's 1985 song "Nothing Compares 2 U" about Melvoin. The song charted after Sinéad O'Connor released a hit cover version in 1990.

Melvoin later joined the expanded line-up of the Revolution – adding backing vocals to Parade including the 1986 single "Anotherloverholenyohead". She designed the Dream Factory jacket and received a credit on Sign o' the Times co-writing the song "Starfish and Coffee", and backing vocals on "The Ballad of Dorothy Parker".

Melvoin was engaged to Prince who wrote several songs about her.

== Later work ==
Melvoin has subsequently worked as a backing vocalist for such artists as Roger Waters, Eric Clapton, and Mike Oldfield and has performed vocals on Wendy & Lisa albums.

She co-wrote songs for Eric Clapton and then-husband Doyle Bramhall II's band, Arc Angels.

She also co-wrote songs performed by Madonna, such as Ray of Light's fourth track "Candy Perfume Girl", which was written with William Orbit. It was to have been featured on "what she thought would either become her solo debut or an album by Orbit's Strange Cargo project, which she – and, it turns out, Madonna – both loved." Orbit offered Madonna the songs he had written with Melvoin, who received no credit or compensation. She stated that she "has no beef with Madonna," but added that "had I gotten proper publishing on Ray of Light, I wouldn't be worried about my financial life." She is actually credited in the song's credits via physical format and Apple Music.

Outside of music, she has performed in small or cameo roles in three small-budget films, including Skin & Bone and Luster.

== Personal life ==
Melvoin was married to Doyle Bramhall II, with whom she had two children. The couple separated in 2010. Their subsequent divorce proceedings were characterized in the tabloids as being "messy," due in part to Bramhall's relationship with actress Renée Zellweger, which started in 2012 before the divorce was settled.
