= Wendy Melvoin =

American guitarist and singer-songwriter (born 1964)

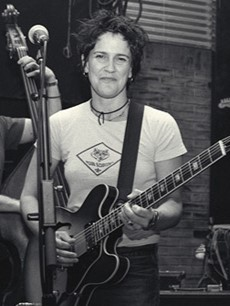
- Melvoin in 2006

Background information
- Born: Wendy Ann Melvoin; January 26, 1964 (age 62)
- Origin: Los Angeles, California, United States
- Genres: Alternative rock; funk; R&B; rock; pop; new wave; Minneapolis sound
- Occupations: Musician; arranger; composer; songwriter; record producer
- Instruments: Guitar; bass guitar; mandolin; drums; vocals
- Years active: 1980–present
- Labels: Columbia, SME, Virgin, EMI, World Domination
- Member of: The Revolution, Wendy & Lisa
- Partner: Lisa Coleman (1981–2002)

Wendy Ann Melvoin (born January 26, 1964) is an American guitarist and singer-songwriter, best known for her work with Prince as part of his backing band the Revolution, and for her collaboration with Lisa Coleman as one half of the duo Wendy & Lisa.

== Music career ==
Wendy Melvoin met Prince in 1980 when her girlfriend Lisa Coleman joined Prince's band for the Dirty Mind period. Prince would stay at their house when he came to the Los Angeles area and she was regularly at the Dirty Mind, Controversy, and 1999 tour shows. She was watching from backstage when Prince and the band opened for the Rolling Stones in 1981. One night when she was practicing guitar in Coleman's room, Prince overheard and asked Coleman who was playing guitar. A few days later, when guitarist Dez Dickerson did not show up at soundcheck, Prince asked Melvoin to play his guitar; that same night after asking Coleman first, Prince invited Melvoin to join the band. Melvoin sang backup on the 1999 album song "Free", as well as the B-side single "Irresistible Bitch". Melvoin's debut show with the Revolution was a benefit concert for the Minnesota Dance Theatre at the First Avenue nightclub in Minneapolis on August 3, 1983. This concert was recorded and some of the songs ("Let's Go Crazy", "Computer Blue", "Purple Rain", "Baby I'm a Star", and "I Would Die 4 U") were released on Purple Rain, Prince's next record. Melvoin was 19 at the time.

Melvoin then worked extensively with Prince in the studio on songs released and unreleased, as well as contributing to protégé projects such as 1984's Apollonia 6, 1985's the Family, and the 1985 Prince & the Revolution album Around the World in a Day.

Shortly after the completion of Prince and the Revolution's album tour in October 1986 Parade, Coleman and Melvoin left the Revolution and started their own duo, Wendy & Lisa, also known as Girl Brothers.

Melvoin performed with Prince at a Bangles show later in 1986 and appears on Prince's 1987 album Sign o' the Times on the tracks "Slow Love", "Strange Relationship", and "It's Gonna Be a Beautiful Night".

Melvoin and Coleman also composed music for the first season of the TV series Heroes. In September 2008, they announced that they would release an album consisting entirely of the score from Heroes, titled Heroes: Original Score. Melvoin and Coleman composed the main title song for Nurse Jackie, for which they were awarded an Emmy in 2010. As of mid-November 2015, the duo was working on the American TV series Touch.

Melvoin and Coleman performed with Prince on and off during the 2004–2007 period: notably, the 2004 Tavis Smiley show performing "Reflections" with Prince; a June 5, 2004, Musicology tour aftershow; the 2006 Brit Award Show; and the 2007 Triple Hit shows in Minneapolis (the Macey's Show, the Target show, and the First Avenue show.) They also worked on a few songs on Prince's Planet Earth album.

Melvoin also contributed guitars to Madonna's 2008 album Hard Candy on the song "She's Not Me". She is mentioned by name during the song.

Melvoin contributed heavily to Neil Finn's second solo album One Nil, co-writing many tracks and playing drums and bass on several. She is credited for guitar work on most of the tracks on Rob Thomas's first solo album, ...Something to Be.

Melvoin also contributed to Glen Campbell's final studio album, Ghost on the Canvas (2011).

== Personal life ==
Wendy Melvoin was born in Los Angeles, California. Her father Mike Melvoin was a pianist and member of studio musicians known as the Wrecking Crew, and also a former president of the National Academy of Recording Arts and Sciences. Her brother Jonathan Melvoin was a touring keyboardist with the Smashing Pumpkins, and her twin sister is singer and composer Susannah Melvoin. Melvoin is half-Jewish; she claimed that when she and Coleman tried to reunite with Prince for a Revolution tour in 2000, he refused to do so unless Melvoin converted to Jehovah's Witnesses, a statement which Prince confirmed to his friend Neal Karlen as factual.

In April 2009, Melvoin gave an interview with Out that, for the first time, publicly revealed she is a lesbian and discussed her past romantic relationship with Coleman, who is still her musical partner.

== Awards and recognition ==
In 2007, the ASCAP Film and Television Music Awards gave Melvoin and Coleman the "Top Television Series" award for their work on Heroes.

Melvoin and Coleman were awarded with an Emmy for Outstanding Original Main Title in 2010 for their theme to Nurse Jackie. They also technically share the honor of winners of a Grammy and Oscar for being part of the Revolution, as Purple Rain won two Grammys, and the Oscar for Best Original Score.

In 2014, Melvoin and Coleman received the inaugural Shirley Walker Award from The American Society of Composers, Authors and Publishers (ASCAP), an award which honors those whose achievements have contributed to the diversity of film and television music.

== Collaborations ==
With Meshell Ndegeocello

- Peace Beyond Passion (Maverick Records, 1996)
- Bitter (Maverick Records, 1999)

With Glen Campbell

- Meet Glen Campbell (Capitol Records, 2008)
- Ghost on the Canvas (Surfdog Records, 2011)

With k.d. lang

- Drag (Warner Bros. Records, 1997)
- Invincible Summer (Warner Bros. Records, 2000)

With Doyle Bramhall II

- Doyle Bramhall II (Geffen, 1996)
- Jellycream (RCA Records, 1999)

With Lisa Marie Presley

- To Whom It May Concern (Capitol Records, 2003)

With Michael Penn

- March (RCA Records, 1989)
- Free-for-All (RCA Records, 1992)

With Ilse DeLange

- The Great Escape (Universal Music, 2006)

With Rob Thomas

- ...Something to Be (Atlantic Records, 2005)
- ...Something More (Atlantic Records, 2005)

With Nerina Pallot

- Fires (Idaho Records, 2006)

With Neil Finn

- One Nil (Parlophone Records, 2001)

With Sheryl Crow

- The Globe Sessions (A&M Records, 1998)
- C'mon, C'mon (A&M Records, 2002)

With Seal

- Human Being (Warner Bros. Records, 1998)

With Nikka Costa

- Can'tneverdidnothin' (Virgin Records, 2005)

With Skye Edwards

- Mind How You Go (Atlantic Records, 2006)
