= Manic Monday =

1985 single by the Bangles

- Picture sleeve of US 7-inch single; also used for continental European and Australasian releases.

Single by the Bangles

from the album Different Light
- B-side: "In a Different Light"
- Released: December 23, 1985
- Recorded: 1984 (original Apollonia 6 version, duet with Prince); 1985 (Bangles version)
- Studio: Sunset Sound Factory (Bangles version)
- Genre: Pop rock
- Length: 3:03
- Label: Discos CBS; Columbia
- Songwriter: Prince (as Christopher)
- Producer: David Kahne

The Bangles singles chronology
"Going Down to Liverpool" (1984)	"Manic Monday" (1985)	"If She Knew What She Wants" (1986)

Music video
- "Manic Monday" on YouTube

"Manic Monday" is a song recorded by the American pop rock band the Bangles, which was released as the first single from their second studio album, Different Light (1986). The song was written by Prince, under the pseudonym "Christopher". It was originally intended for the group Apollonia 6 in 1984. Lyrically, it describes a woman who is waking up to go to work on Monday, wishing it was still Sunday so that she could continue relaxing.

The single, released by Columbia Records in late December 1985, received generally positive reviews from music critics, highlighting Prince's craftsmanship and the Bangles' vocal performance. It was compared with the Mamas & the Papas' song "Monday, Monday", although critics described "Manic Monday" as deceptively simple and without lyrical depth.

It became the Bangles' breakthrough hit, reaching number two in the United States, where it was kept from the top position by Prince and the Revolution's "Kiss". It also peaked at number two in several other countries, including the United Kingdom, Canada, Germany, and Ireland, and reached the top five in Australia, New Zealand, Norway, and Switzerland. "Manic Monday" was later certified gold in the UK and Canada.

Following Prince's death in 2016, his original version of the song was officially released with him as the primary vocalist on the 2019 demo compilation Originals. In 2020, Billie Joe Armstrong, the vocalist of Green Day, covered the song.

== Background and writing ==
Prince wrote "Manic Monday" in 1984, and recorded it as a duet for Apollonia 6's self-titled album, but he eventually pulled the song. Two years later, he offered the single to the Bangles under the pseudonym "Christopher", a character he played in the 1986 film Under the Cherry Moon. It was rumored by various writers that after Prince listened to the band's 1984 debut album All Over the Place, he gave the song to the Bangles rhythm guitarist Susanna Hoffs, in hopes of having sex. Hoffs rejected the claims, describing it as an "uncomfortable situation" that caused issues with her partner, while other Bangles members disregarded it as the "Prince stuff".

In an interview with MTV UK in 1989, Debbi Peterson explained why Prince gave them the song: "[Prince] really liked our first album. He liked the song 'Hero Takes a Fall', which is a great compliment, because we liked his music. He contacted us, and said, 'I've got a couple of songs for you. I'd like to know if you're interested,' and of course we were. One of the songs Prince brought to the group was 'Manic Monday', written under the pseudonym of Christopher." Peterson talked about the evolution of what Prince brought them: "It was a Banglefication of a Prince arrangement. He had a demo that was very specifically him. It was a good song, but we didn't record it like 'This is our first hit single! Oh my God! I can feel it in my veins!' We just did the song, and the album, and then sat back and thought about it".

=== Composition ===
Susanna Hoffs on "Manic Monday"
"When I first heard that 'oh whoa' melody I thought of the Velvet Underground. Then when I heard the title I thought of Jimi Hendrix [who sang 'Manic Depression']. But then with the Monday part [and] the harmonies I thought of the Mamas & the Papas. It has a lot of the elements of emotion [and] style that [the Bangles] connect to. And [young people] really pick-up on the nursery rhyme appeal[;] like 'Sally Go 'Round the Roses', [there's] a nice simplicity to it."

The Bangles reworked "Manic Monday" and added their own style to it. Although Prince was known for being overly controlling over his work, he approved the final version. The song is performed at a tempo of 116 beats per minute and is set in common time. It is a pop rock song written in D major. The song has a sequence of D–A_{7}–G–D–A_{7}–G as its chord progression. Lyrically, the protagonist sings about waking up from a romantic dream about Rudolph Valentino at six o'clock on Monday morning, and facing a hectic journey to work when she would prefer to still be enjoying relaxing on Sunday—her "I-don't-have-to-run day".

=== Release and performances ===
"Manic Monday" was released in the Netherlands on December 23, 1985. The Bangles and Prince performed the song live together on October 20, 1986, at Avalon Hollywood, with Prince singing and playing the tambourine. Following Prince's death in 2016, an official version of "Manic Monday" was posthumously released with him as the primary vocalist. That recording appears on the 2019 demo compilation album, Originals.

== Reception ==
"Manic Monday"
A 21-second sample of "Manic Monday". It includes the rhyme "I wish it were Sunday ... My 'I-don't-have-to-run day'", which music critic Dorian Lynskey considered "painful".

=== Critical response ===
Some critics compared the song with the single "Monday, Monday" by the band the Mamas & the Papas. In a retrospective review for AllMusic, Mark Deming wrote that the single was a departure from anything the Bangles had previously recorded; while Matthew Greenwald, also from the website, described it as a "deceptively simple" and "infectious pop" narrative with a well-crafted bridge that demonstrated Prince's songwriting skills, which was performed with style by the Bangles.

Robert Hilburn of the Los Angeles Times described the song as a strong contender for best single of the year. The Guardian music critic Dorian Lynskey pointed out the rhyme of "Sunday" with "I-don't-have-to-run day" as "painful". Mark Moses of The Phoenix criticized the song's lack of lyrical depth, arguing that even Prince's weaker material seemed comparatively substantial.

Greg Baker of The Miami News wrote in his album review that the track had the potential to establish the Bangles in mainstream pop. A writer in The Blade described "Manic Monday" as "infectious" and, along with "If She Knew What She Wants", "refreshingly melodic". Chris Willman from the Los Angeles Times commented that the single reflected Prince's attempt to craft a Mamas & the Papas–style hit, largely successfully despite an incongruous dance-oriented interlude. Jeff Mezydlo from Yardbarker drew comparisons to the Monkees' songs.

=== Chart performance ===
"Manic Monday" debuted at number 86 on the Billboard Hot 100, on the chart dated January 25, 1986, and reached a peak of number two, on the issue dated April 19, 1986, behind Prince and the Revolution's single "Kiss". In the United Kingdom, "Manic Monday" debuted at number 85 on February 8, 1986, and entered the top 40 at number 24, on February 22, 1986. The song eventually reached its peak position, at number two, the next month. In Germany, the single debuted at number 29 on March 17, 1986, reaching the top 10 in the next three weeks and its peak, also at number two, on April 14, 1986, where it stayed two weeks. It remained in the top 10 for four more weeks, leaving the charts on July 20, 1986.

In Switzerland, "Manic Monday" debuted at number 12 on March 30, 1986, becoming the highest debut of the week. It reached its peak two weeks later at number four, where it remained for another week. In the Netherlands, the single debuted at number 43 on February 22, 1986, and later reached number 24. It stayed on the chart for seven weeks. In Norway, "Manic Monday" debuted at number nine in the tenth week of 1986, becoming the second-highest debut of the week. It also reached number four two weeks later, where it stayed for another two weeks. The song also peaked within the top five on the Austrian, Irish, and New Zealand charts.

"Manic Monday" has received certifications, including a gold certification from Music Canada for 50,000 units and a gold certification from the British Phonographic Industry for 500,000 units.

== Track listing and formats ==
7-inch single

1. A. "Manic Monday" – 3:03
2. B. "In a Different Light" – 2:50

12-inch maxi (1985)

1. A. "Manic Monday" – 3:03
2. A. "In a Different Light" – 2:50
3. B. "Going Down to Liverpool" – 3:19
4. B. "Dover Beach" – 3:42

12-inch maxi (1986)

1. A. "Manic Monday" – 3:03
2. B. "Manic Monday" (Extended version) – 4:38
3. B. "In a Different Light" – 2:50

Digital single

1. "Manic Monday" – 3:06

Starbox

1. "Manic Monday" (Extended "California" Version) – 4:59

== Credits and personnel ==
The Bangles version

- Susanna Hoffs – guitar, lead vocals
- Vicki Peterson – lead guitar, backing vocals
- Michael Steele – bass, backing vocals
- Debbi Peterson – drums, backing vocals
- David Kahne – keyboards, producer
- Prince as "Christopher" – writer, composer

Prince version

Credits sourced from Duane Tudahl, Benoît Clerc and Guitarcloud

- Prince – lead and backing vocals, piano, Yamaha DX7, Oberheim OB-X, acoustic guitar, bass guitar, drums
- Brenda Bennett – backing vocals
- Jill Jones – backing vocals

== Cover versions ==
Producers Party Ben and Team9, under the shared alias "Dean Gray", released the mashup album American Edit (2005), based on remixes of Green Day's album American Idiot (2004) with songs by various artist. The thirteenth song, "Whatsername", was retitled "Whatsername (Susanna Hoffs)" and blended with "Manic Monday". Evan Sawdey praised it as seamless and remarkably well integrated.

In 2020, Billie Joe Armstrong, the vocalist of Green Day, covered the song for his No Fun Mondays series. Susanna Hoffs plays guitar and provides backing vocals that, according to Andrew Trendell of NME, "match Armstrong's silky sentimental side". Ryan Reed wrote for Rolling Stone that the version replaces the "twinkling synths and clean strums with palm-muted crunch". In the same year, Kate Rusby covered "Manic Monday" for her album Hand Me Down, which was performed at a slower tempo. Accordingly, Derek Walker described it as more appropriate for a Sunday, although not in a negative way.

== Charts ==
=== Weekly charts ===
Weekly chart performance
Chart (1986–1987)	Peak position
Australia (Kent Music Report)	3
Austria (Ö3 Austria Top 40)	2
Belgium (Ultratop 50 Flanders)	19
Canada Top Singles (RPM)	2
Europe (European Hot 100 Singles)	6
Ireland (IRMA)	2
Japan (Oricon)	56
Luxembourg (Radio Luxembourg)	2
Netherlands (Dutch Top 40)	24
Netherlands (Single Top 100)	22
New Zealand (Recorded Music NZ)	5
Norway (VG-lista)	4
Quebec (ADISQ)	10
South Africa (Springbok Radio)	1
Switzerland (Schweizer Hitparade)	4
UK Singles (Official Charts)	2
US Billboard Hot 100	2
US Adult Contemporary (Billboard)	10
US Cash Box Top 100	3
West Germany (GfK)	2

=== Year-end charts ===
Year-end chart performance
Chart (1986)	Position
Australia (Kent Music Report)	16
Canada Top Singles (RPM)	38
Europe (European Hot 100 Singles)	53
New Zealand (RIANZ)	46
South Africa (Springbok Radio)	6
Switzerland (Schweizer Hitparade)	24
UK Singles (OCC)	37
US Billboard Hot 100	48
US Cash Box Top 100	37
West Germany (Media Control)	22

== Certifications ==
Certifications
Region	Certification	Certified units/sales
Canada (Music Canada)	Gold	50,000^{^}
United Kingdom (BPI)	Gold	500,000^{‡}
^{^} Shipments figures based on certification alone.^{‡} Sales+streaming figures based on certification alone.
