= Originals (Prince album) =

Demo album by Prince
- Released: June 7, 2019
- Recorded: 1981–1985; 1991
- Length: 63:49
- Labels: NPG; Warner
- Producer: Prince

Prince chronology
Piano and a Microphone 1983 (2018)	Originals (2019)	Welcome 2 America (2021)

Originals is a posthumous demo album by American musician Prince, released by Warner Records on June 7, 2019 (on what would have been Prince's 61st birthday), exclusively through Tidal, with a wide release following on June 21, 2019. It compiles the original demo versions of songs Prince wrote and gave to other artists. All except for Prince's recording of "Nothing Compares 2 U", which was first officially released in 2018, were previously unreleased. The demo album was met with widespread critical acclaim, and debuted at number 15 on the Billboard 200, as well as the top 10 in Belgium, Hungary, Portugal, and Switzerland.

== Background ==
The songs were written and the demos recorded from the early 1980s to the early 1990s, but a specific emphasis was placed on those recorded between 1981 and 1985 due to the size of Prince's unreleased archive. Troy Carter, a music manager and entertainment adviser to Prince's estate, selected the tracks, with some input from Jay-Z, who "pushed" for Prince's demo for Martika's 1991 single "Love... Thy Will Be Done" to be included.

== Critical reception ==
Professional ratings
Aggregate scores
Source	Rating
Metacritic	88/100
Review scores
Source	Rating
AllMusic	3.5/5 stars
Classic Pop	3.5/5 stars
Paste	8.6/10
Pitchfork	9.5/10
The Guardian	4/5 stars
NME	5/5 stars
Entertainment Weekly	A−
Rolling Stone	4/5 stars

Originals was met with widespread critical acclaim. At Metacritic, the album received an average score of 88, based on 17 reviews.

Rebecca Bengal of Pitchfork awarded the album a "Best New Reissue" tag and said that "Hearing Prince sing these songs that he gave to other performers brings you close to the pulse of his artistry: transgressive, funky, sexy, a testament to his genius even in the form of demos." Wyndham Wallace of Classic Pop wrote that "the slow unveiling of Prince's private recordings remains suitably seductive, if – true to form – wilfully unpredictable," noting that the record's "greatest revelation is how few artists strayed far from the Prince template of these Originals." Adam Mattera in Echoes wrote "fans can debate amongst themselves whether Morris Day’s pimp loverboy croon tops Prince’s coquettish Valentino vocal approach to the creamy slow jam "Gigolos Get Lonely Too", but what’s in no doubt is the virtuosity of the talent that tossed out these funk diamonds and pop pearls with abandon through the 80s into the mid 90s."

== Track listing ==
All tracks are written by Prince, except where noted.

Originals track listing
No.	Title	Writer(s)	Original artist	Length
1.	"Sex Shooter"		Apollonia 6	3:06
2.	"Jungle Love"	Prince; Morris Day; Jesse Johnson	The Time	3:04
3.	"Manic Monday"		The Bangles	2:51
4.	"Noon Rendezvous"	Prince; Sheila E.	Sheila E.	3:00
5.	"Make-Up"		Vanity 6	2:27
6.	"100 MPH"		Mazarati	3:30
7.	"You're My Love"		Kenny Rogers	4:24
8.	"Holly Rock"	Prince; Sheila E.	Sheila E.	6:38
9.	"Baby, You're a Trip"		Jill Jones	5:51
10.	"The Glamorous Life"		Sheila E.	4:12
11.	"Gigolos Get Lonely Too"		The Time	4:41
12.	"Love... Thy Will Be Done"	Prince; Martika	Martika	4:07
13.	"Dear Michaelangelo"	Prince; Sheila E.	Sheila E.	5:22
14.	"Wouldn't You Love to Love Me?"		Taja Sevelle	5:56
15.	"Nothing Compares 2 U"		The Family	4:40
Total length:				63:49

Japanese and Target editions bonus track
No.	Title	Length
16.	"Nothing Compares 2 U" (Cinematic Mix)	4:24

== Charts ==
=== Weekly charts ===
Weekly chart performance for Originals
Chart (2019)	Peak position
Australian Albums (ARIA)	18
Austrian Albums (Ö3 Austria)	34
Belgian Albums (Ultratop Flanders)	7
Belgian Albums (Ultratop Wallonia)	31
Canadian Albums (Billboard)	66
Dutch Albums (Album Top 100)	11
French Albums (SNEP)	32
German Albums (Offizielle Top 100)	26
Hungarian Albums (MAHASZ)	8
Irish Albums (IRMA)	53
Italian Albums (FIMI)	59
Japan Hot Albums (Billboard Japan)	25
Japanese Albums (Oricon)	15
Portuguese Albums (AFP)	7
Scottish Albums (Official Charts)	11
Spanish Albums (Promusicae)	13
Swedish Albums (Sverigetopplistan)	54
Swiss Albums (Schweizer Hitparade)	9
UK Albums (Official Charts)	21
US Billboard 200	15
US Top R&B/Hip-Hop Albums (Billboard)	9

=== Year-end charts ===
Year-end chart performance for Originals
Chart (2019)	Position
Belgian Albums (Ultratop Flanders)	159

== Release history ==
Release history and formats for Originals
Region	Release date	Version	Format
Various	June 7, 2019	Standard (Tidal only)	Streaming
Various	June 21, 2019	Standard (other retailers)	CD; digital download; streaming
Various	July 19, 2019	Standard; limited deluxe	LP; 2LP+CD
