= 17 Days (song) =

Song by Prince and the Revolution
- A-side: "When Doves Cry"
- Released: May 16, 1984
- Recorded: January 8 – March 18, 1984
- Studio: Sunset Sound (Los Angeles, California)
- Length: 3:59
- Label: Warner Bros.
- Songwriters: Prince; Wendy Melvoin; Lisa Coleman; Dr. Fink
- Producer: Prince

"17 Days (the rain will come down, then U will have 2 choose. If U believe look 2 the dawn and U shall never lose.)" is a song by Prince and the Revolution, and was released as the B-side of Prince's single "When Doves Cry" from Purple Rain. Intended for the side project Apollonia 6, it was originally recorded with the intention of making it a solo track for Apollonia 6 member Brenda Bennett. Ultimately, Prince would record it himself and release it as a B-side. Despite this, it remained a fan favorite, and it would often appear in Prince's live setlist until the year of his death.

== Background ==
Prince originally began work on "17 Days" with the Revolution in August 1983, during the same sessions held for "Let's Go Crazy" and "Computer Blue". The track was created as a result of a jam, similar to the composition of the latter track. According to Revolution guitarist Wendy Melvoin, the genesis of a track started with the riff: "Me and Lisa started playing a riff, and Prince started singing that melody". Lisa would later specify that it was specifically the organ riff during the bridge section, "...and we just started jamming on that". At this point in time, Vanity had left the group Vanity 6 and the Purple Rain project altogether, and so member Brenda Bennett came in to record vocals on this first version of the track. Once Apollonia Kotero joined the project, the group became known as Apollonia 6, and the track was one of the first intended for their album.

However, after a few months and the recording of a jam based on the song, Prince decided to completely redo the track on his own in January 1984, with Wendy, Lisa, and Jill Jones contributing backing vocals. Despite this change, Bennett was still involved, having recorded a vocal to be used on the track, which would ultimately be buried in the mix.

Lisa Coleman would later remark on how Prince would channel the song in an interview with The Guardian:

He sang the part of the lonely person a lot, like "When You Were Mine" or "The Beautiful Ones". Even though he’s got the prowess of a [laughs] love god, an incredible kind of fantasy person, at the same time he was like a deer in headlights, a very vulnerable person. Those big brown eyes would kill you. But he struggled with his success. One of the reasons he stayed in Minnesota all his life is that it allowed him a little bit of freedom. It was hard after Purple Rain, because it was limos and planes and thousands of people, all the time. I think it was hard for him to decide when he could just be Prince, the guy, and when he had to become Prince the superstar. He gave himself so thoroughly to it.

== Legacy ==
The song has since been claimed to be a forgotten masterpiece, with multiple positive reviews and acclaim given for its lyrics and themes. When it was released, it was the first song to be officially credited to Prince and the Revolution rather than just Prince. Additionally, it proved to be a live favorite, with Prince frequently pulling the song out for his setlist until just a few months before his death. The song was also covered by Living Colour in 1993, and included on the Japanese release Dread.

== Personnel ==
Credits sourced from Duane Tudahl, Benoît Clerc, Prince Vault and Guitarcloud.

- Prince – lead and backing vocals, electric guitar, Oberheim synthesizers, bass guitar, Linn LM-1, percussion
- Brenda Bennett – co-lead vocals
- Wendy Melvoin – backing vocals, electric guitar
- Lisa Coleman – backing vocals, Oberheim synthesizers
- Jill Jones – backing vocals
- Sheila E. – percussion
