= When Doves Cry =

1984 single by Prince

- Picture sleeve for 7-inch single release (Note: Some non-US 7-inch and 12-inch single releases using this artwork contain Prince's name and the song title.)

Single by Prince

from the album Purple Rain
- B-side: "17 Days"
- Released: May 16, 1984
- Studio: Sunset Sound (Los Angeles, California)
- Genre: Funk; synth-pop; soul; experimental pop; avant-pop; neo-psychedelia
- Length: 5:52 (album and 12-inch version); 3:47 (7-inch single edit)
- Label: Warner Bros.
- Songwriter: Prince
- Producer: Prince

Prince US singles chronology
"Automatic" (1983)	"When Doves Cry" (1984)	"Let's Go Crazy" (1984)

Music video
- "When Doves Cry" on YouTube

"When Doves Cry"
Prince's "When Doves Cry" from Purple Rain

"When Doves Cry" is a song by American musician Prince, and the lead single from his sixth studio album Purple Rain. According to the DVD commentary of the film Purple Rain (1984), Prince was asked by director Albert Magnoli to write a song to match the theme of a particular segment of the film that involved Prince's character The Kid's intermingled parental difficulties with his father Francis L. (Clarence Williams III) and mother (Olga Karlatos) and a love affair with Apollonia (Apollonia Kotero). The next morning, Prince had composed two songs, one of which was "When Doves Cry". According to Prince's biographer Per Nilsen, the song was inspired by his relationship with Vanity 6 member Susan Moonsie.

"When Doves Cry" was Prince's first Billboard Hot 100 No. 1 single, staying there for five weeks, and was also a worldwide hit. According to Billboard, it was the top-selling single of 1984. It is certified Platinum by the Recording Industry Association of America (RIAA). It was the last single released by a solo artist to receive a Platinum certification before the certification requirements were lowered in 1989. "When Doves Cry" was ranked number one on the Billboard Year-End Hot 100 singles of 1984. Following Prince's death in 2016, the song re-charted on the Billboard Hot 100 chart at number eight, its first appearance in the top 10 since the week ending September 1, 1984.

The music video, directed by Prince, premiered on MTV in June 1984. It opens with white doves emerging from double doors to reveal Prince in a bathtub, then shows him performing the song in various scenes. The video sparked controversy among network executives, who thought that its sexual nature was too explicit for television. "When Doves Cry" is ranked number 37 on Rolling Stone's list of the 500 Greatest Songs of All Time and is included in The Rock and Roll Hall of Fame's 500 Songs that Shaped Rock and Roll.

== Background and composition ==
Prince wrote and composed "When Doves Cry" after all the other tracks were complete on Purple Rain. In addition to providing vocals, he played all instruments on the track. The song's texture is remarkably stark. There is no bass line, which is very unusual for an '80s dance song; Prince said that there originally was a bass line but, after a conversation with singer Jill Jones, he decided that the song was too conventional with it included. The song features a guitar solo intro and a Linn LM-1 drum machine, followed by a looped guttural vocal. After the lyrics, there is another, much longer, guitar and synthesizer solo. The song ends on a classical music-inspired keyboard piece backed by another synthesizer solo. Keyboardist Matt Fink revealed in 2014 that the baroque synthesizer solo was recorded by Prince at half speed and an octave lower against a half-speed backing track, then sped up to create the final version. Fink was then tasked to learn and perform the solo at the album's speed.

On versions edited for radio, either the song fades out as the long guitar and synthesizer solo begins, or the solo is eliminated altogether and the song skips to the ending with Prince's harmonizing and classical finish.

During live performances of the song on the Purple Rain Tour, Prince's bass player Brown Mark added bass lines to the song as well as to other songs without bass lines.

The song is in the key of A minor.

== Reception ==
In its contemporary review of the song, Cash Box said that "featuring ethereal lyrics, a pounding backbeat and a sometimes ominous musical atmosphere, this single again proves Prince to be one of the most provocative and sophisticated artists in the business."

"When Doves Cry" was No. 1 in the US for five weeks, from July 7, 1984, to August 4, 1984, keeping Bruce Springsteen's "Dancing in the Dark" from reaching the top spot. Because of tabulation differences, the song was announced as the year's No. 2 single on the American Top 40 year-end countdown (with Paul McCartney featuring Michael Jackson's "Say Say Say" at No. 1). The song was voted as the best single of the year in The Village Voice Pazz & Jop critics' poll. Billboard ranked it as the No. 1 year-end single of 1984. In 2016, after Prince's death, "When Doves Cry" re-entered the Billboard Hot 100 at No. 20, peaking at No. 8. It also ranked No. 1 on the Billboard Hot Black Singles chart for eight weeks (from June 30, to August 18, 1984), preventing Tina Turner's "What's Love Got to Do With It" from reaching the top spot for five of those weeks.

The B-side was the cult fan favorite "17 Days", which was originally intended for Apollonia 6's self-titled album. A 12-inch single issued in the UK included "17 Days" and two tracks from Prince's previous album, 1999: its title track and "D.M.S.R.". The entire title of "17 Days (the rain will come down, then U will have 2 choose, if U believe, look 2 the dawn and U shall never lose)" is now the longest-titled flip side of a Hot 100 No. 1, with 85 letters and/or numbers.

"When Doves Cry" became one of Prince's signature songs. Spin magazine ranked "When Doves Cry" the No. 6 song of all time. In 2021, Rolling Stone ranked "When Doves Cry" No. 37 on its list of "The 500 Greatest Songs of All Time". In 2006, VH1's "The 100 Greatest Songs of the '80s" ranked the song at No. 5. On October 13, 2008, the song was voted No. 2 on Australian VH1's Top 10 Number One Pop Songs countdown. The "80 of the 80s" podcast ranks it as the No. 59 song of the decade. In 2016, Paste ranked the song number three on their list of the 50 greatest Prince songs, and in 2022, American Songwriter ranked the song number two on their list of the 10 greatest Prince songs.

"When Doves Cry" was sampled for use in MC Hammer's 1990 hit song, "Pray" from his album Please Hammer Don't Hurt 'Em, one of the few samples of his songs legally sanctioned by Prince.

"When Doves Cry" was licensed for use in film or television for the first time in 2025, being employed in the series finale of the Netflix streaming series Stranger Things.

In June 2026, CBS News included the song in its list of the 250 essential American songs of the past 250 years.

== Music video ==
The music video (directed by Prince himself) was released on MTV in June 1984. It opens with white doves emerging from double doors to reveal Prince in a bathtub. It also includes scenes from the Purple Rain film interspersed with shots of The Revolution performing and dancing in a white room. The final portion of the video incorporates a mirrored frame of the left half of the picture, creating a doubling effect. The video was nominated for Best Choreography at the 1985 MTV Video Music Awards. The video sparked controversy among network executives, who thought that its sexual nature was too explicit for television.

It was directed by Larry Williams, but producer Simon Fields has said that Williams' actual involvement was limited because Prince wanted greater creative control over the project — an idea that keyboardist Lisa Coleman has corroborated.

== Awards and nominations ==
- American Music Awards – 1985 – Favorite Black Single (won)
- Pazz & Jop critics' poll: best single of the year, 1984 (won)

== Track listings ==
- 7-inch single: Paisley Park / 0-20170 (US)
1. "When Doves Cry" – 3:47
2. "17 Days (The rain will come down, then U will have 2 choose. If U believe, look 2 the dawn and U shall never lose.)" – 3:54
- 12-inch single: Warner Bros. / W9286T (UK)
1. "When Doves Cry" – 5:52
2. "17 Days (The rain will come down, then U will have 2 choose. If U believe, look 2 the dawn and U shall never lose.)" – 3:54
1. "1999" – 6:22
2. "D.M.S.R." – 8:05
- 2×12-inch pack
- CD single 1989
1. "When Doves Cry"
2. "Purple Rain" (album version)

== Personnel ==
Credits are adapted from Duane Tudahl, Benoît Clerc and Guitarcloud.

- Prince – lead and backing vocals, electric guitar, Yamaha DX7, Oberheim OB-Xa, Linn LM-1

== Charts ==
=== Weekly charts ===
1984 weekly chart performance for "When Doves Cry"
Chart (1984)	Peak position
Australia (Kent Music Report)	1
Austria (Ö3 Austria Top 40)	19
Belgium (Ultratop 50 Flanders)	6
Belgium (VRT Top 30 Flanders)	7
Canada (CHUM)	1
Canada Top Singles (RPM)	1
Canada (The Record)	1
Finland (Suomen virallinen lista)	4
France (SNEP)	32
Ireland (IRMA)	2
Luxembourg (Radio Luxembourg)	2
Netherlands (Dutch Top 40)	5
Netherlands (Single Top 100)	6
New Zealand (Recorded Music NZ)	2
Norway (VG-lista)	10
South Africa (Springbok Radio)	6
Sweden (Sverigetopplistan)	18
Switzerland (Schweizer Hitparade)	17
UK Singles (Official Charts)	4
US Billboard Hot 100	1
US Hot Black Singles (Billboard)	1
US Dance Club Songs (Billboard)	1
US Cash Box	1
West Germany (GfK)	16

2016 weekly chart performance for "When Doves Cry"
Chart (2016)	Peak position
Australia (ARIA)	11
Austria (Ö3 Austria Top 40)	59
Belgium (Back Catalogue Singles Flanders)	2
Canada Hot 100 (Billboard)	29
France (SNEP)	11
Germany (GfK)	49
Ireland (IRMA)	69
New Zealand (Recorded Music NZ)	35
Scottish Singles Sales (Official Charts)	10
Spain (Promusicae)	35
Switzerland (Schweizer Hitparade)	34
UK Singles (Official Charts)	26
UK Hip Hop/R&B (Official Charts)	9
US Billboard Hot 100	8
US Hot R&B/Hip-Hop Songs (Billboard)	5
US Hot Rock & Alternative Songs (Billboard)	2

=== Year-end charts ===
1984 year-end chart performance for "When Doves Cry"
Chart (1984)	Position
Australia (Kent Music Report)	14
Belgium (Ultratop 50 Flanders)	39
Canada Top Singles (RPM)	10
Netherlands (Dutch Top 40)	27
Netherlands (Single Top 100)	35
New Zealand (RIANZ)	15
US Billboard Hot 100	1
US Hot Black Singles (Billboard)	1

2016 year-end chart performance for "When Doves Cry"
Chart (2016)	Position
US Hot Rock Songs (Billboard)	24

=== All-time charts ===
All-time chart performance for "When Doves Cry"
Chart (2018)	Position
US Billboard Hot 100	123

== Certifications ==
Certifications for "When Doves Cry"
Region	Certification	Certified units/sales
New Zealand (RMNZ)	2× Platinum	60,000^{‡}
United Kingdom (BPI)	Platinum	600,000^{‡}
United States (RIAA) 1984 sales	Platinum	2,000,000^{^}
United States digital sales	—	1,752,251
^{^} Shipments figures based on certification alone.^{‡} Sales+streaming figures based on certification alone.

== Quindon Tarver version ==
"When Dove's Cry"

Single by Quindon Tarver

from the album William Shakespeare's Romeo + Juliet: Music from the Motion Picture, Volume 2
- Released: June 29, 1997
- Length: 4:09
- Label: Capitol
- Songwriter: Prince
- Producer: Nellee Hooper

Quindon Tarver singles chronology
"Everybody's Free" (1997)	"When Dove's Cry" (1997)	"Everybody's Free (To Wear Sunscreen)" (1998)

Audio
- "When Dove's Cry" on YouTube

American singer Quindon Tarver recorded a version of "When Doves Cry" (formatted as "When Dove's Cry") for the second volume of the Romeo + Juliet soundtrack. Released as a single in June 1997, Tarver's version became a top-three hit in Australia, reaching number three on the ARIA Singles Chart that July. It also charted in New Zealand, where it peaked at number 34 on the RIANZ Singles Chart the following month.

=== Charts ===
==== Weekly charts ====
Weekly chart performance for "When Dove's Cry" by Quindon Tarver
Chart (1997)	Peak position
Australia (ARIA)	3
New Zealand (Recorded Music NZ)	34

==== Year-end charts ====
Year-end chart performance for "When Dove's Cry" by Quindon Tarver
Chart (1997)	Position
Australia (ARIA)	38

=== Certifications ===
Certifications for "When Dove's Cry" by Quindon Tarver
Region	Certification	Certified units/sales
Australia (ARIA)	Gold	35,000^{^}
^{‡} Sales+streaming figures based on certification alone.

== Ginuwine version ==
"When Doves Cry"

Single by Ginuwine

from the album Ginuwine... the Bachelor
- Released: July 25, 1997
- Genre: R&B
- Length: 5:09
- Label: Epic
- Songwriter: Prince
- Producer: Timbaland

Ginuwine singles chronology
"Tell Me Do U Wanna" (1997)	"When Doves Cry" (1997)	"I'll Do Anything/I'm Sorry" (1997)

A cover version by American singer Ginuwine was produced by Timbaland and released a month after Tarver's version, on July 25, 1997, for Ginuwine's album The Bachelor; Ginuwine's cover uses actual dove sound effects as texture for the song. The official music video for this version was directed by Michael Lucero.

=== Charts ===
==== Weekly charts ====
Weekly chart performance for "When Doves Cry" by Ginuwine
Chart (1997)	Peak position
Belgium (Ultratip Bubbling Under Flanders)	16
Germany (GfK)	15
Netherlands (Dutch Top 40)	15
Netherlands (Single Top 100)	13
New Zealand (Recorded Music NZ)	7
Scottish Singles Sales (Official Charts)	33
Switzerland (Schweizer Hitparade)	24
Sweden (Sverigetopplistan)	42
UK Singles (Official Charts)	10
UK Hip Hop/R&B (Official Charts)	3
US Rhythmic Airplay (Billboard)	16

==== Year-end charts ====
Year-end chart performance for "When Doves Cry" by Ginuwine
Chart (1997)	Position
Germany (Media Control)	80
Netherlands (Dutch Top 40)	64
Netherlands (Single Top 100)	48

== See also ==
- List of Billboard Hot 100 number-one singles of 1984
