= Boulevard of Broken Songs =

Song by Dean Gray (Party Ben)

from the album American Edit
- Released: Late 2004
- Genre: Mashup; alternative rock; Britpop; hard rock; rap rock
- Length: 4:34
- Songwriters: Billie Joe Armstrong; Mike Dirnt; Tré Cool; Noel Gallagher; Fran Healy; Eminem; Jeff Bass; Luis Resto; Steven Tyler
- Producer: Party Ben

"Boulevard of Broken Songs" (also known as "Wonderwall of Broken Songs" or "Wonderwall of Broken Dreams") is a popular mash-up mixed by American DJ and producer Party Ben in late 2004. The mix consists of elements from American rock band Green Day's "Boulevard of Broken Dreams", English rock band Oasis's "Wonderwall", Scottish soft rock band Travis's "Writing to Reach You", and American rapper Eminem's "Sing for the Moment", which itself samples American hard rock band Aerosmith's "Dream On". "Sing for the Moment" was used solely because Party Ben did not have "Dream On" on hand and was on deadline for his Sixx Mixx radio show. Later versions (see below) used Aerosmith's original.

== Appearances in other media ==
The mash-up first appeared as the finale of Party Ben's Sixx Mixx radio show on LIVE 105 on Friday, October 1, 2004. It was posted as a standalone mp3 on his website a few days later. The track began receiving radio airplay and was eventually aired on hundreds of radio stations worldwide despite having no official release. It eventually landed on many stations' lists of the most-played tracks of 2004 and 2005.

A new version of the mash-up was later created with "Dream On" instead of "Sing for the Moment" and was included on the compilation album The Best Mashups in the World Ever Are from San Francisco. A third version that samples the Aerosmith song and vocals by American rapper Missy Elliott from a remix of American pop singer Madonna's "American Life" was included on American Edit, a full-length mash-up album of American Idiot, produced by Party Ben and Team9 under the name "Dean Gray", which is a spoonerism of "Green Day".

== Reception ==
Vice said that the song's "beauty (...) lies in its universality", and noted it as an early example of material becoming viral.

Party Ben reported having reached an agreement with "record label executives" such that all radio plays of the mashup would count as plays of the original Green Day song, and that this led to the original charting a second time.

== Personnel ==
- Green Day (all versions)
  - Billie Joe Armstrong – lead vocals, guitar
  - Mike Dirnt – bass guitar
  - Tré Cool – drums
- Oasis (all versions)
  - Liam Gallagher – lead vocals
  - Noel Gallagher – acoustic bass and electric guitars, piano
  - Paul Arthurs – acoustic guitar, mellotron
  - Alan White – drums
- Travis (all versions)
  - Fran Healy – backing vocals, guitar
  - Andy Dunlop – guitar
  - Dougie Payne – bass guitar
  - Neil Primrose – drums
- Aerosmith (all versions except the original)
  - Steven Tyler – backing vocals
  - Joe Perry – guitar
  - Brad Whitford – rhythm guitar
  - Tom Hamilton – bass guitar
  - Joey Kramer – drums
- Eminem – backing vocals, rapping (original version only)
- Missy Elliott – vocals (American Edit version only)
