= 17 Days =

17 Days may refer to:

- Seventeen Days, a 2005 album by rock band 3 Doors Down
- "17 Days" (song), a 1984 song by Prince
