= Vanity 6 (album) =

Studio album by Vanity 6
- Released: August 11, 1982
- Recorded: March–April 1982
- Studios: Kiowa Trail Home Studio, Chanhassen, Minnesota; Sunset Sound, Hollywood
- Genres: R&B; funk rock
- Length: 31:12
- Label: Warner Bros.
- Producer: Prince (as The Starr ★ Company)

Singles from Vanity 6
- 1. "He's So Dull" Released: July 9, 1982; 2. "Nasty Girl" Released: September 24, 1982; 3. "Bite the Beat" Released: January 1983; 4. "Drive Me Wild" Released: March 9, 1983

Professional ratings
Review scores
Source	Rating
AllMusic	4/5 stars
Robert Christgau	B+

Vanity 6 is the only studio album by American vocal girl group Vanity 6 released on Warner Bros. Records. All three women in the group (Vanity, Brenda Bennett, Susan Moonsie) shared lead and background vocals. As was typical for Prince's side projects, he obscured his virtually complete responsibility for the production, songwriting, and instrumental performances by arbitrarily attributing the credits to other members of his musical stable or the fictional "The Starr Company". "If a Girl Answers (Don't Hang Up)" was co-written with The Time member Terry Lewis and "Bite the Beat" was co-written with Jesse Johnson.

"Nasty Girl" was featured in the 1984 blockbuster film Beverly Hills Cop.

"He's So Dull" was written by Dez Dickerson and can be heard briefly in the 1983 film National Lampoon's Vacation. The "other woman" rhyme on the song "If a Girl Answers (Don't Hang Up)" is performed by Prince in an affected voice whose resemblance to that of The Time's lead singer Morris Day has sometimes led to Day being misidentified as the performer.

The album was originally released on August 11, 1982, by Warner Bros. Records on LP and cassette. A compact disc was issued in September 1988. All three formats are now out of print. Vinyl copies of the album were pressed with "Side 1" and "Side 6" on the label. Reviewing the album in The Village Voice, Robert Christgau wrote, "All eight of these dumb, dancy little synth tunes get me off when I let my guard down, and most of them are funny, hooky, and raunchy at the same time." The album was certified gold by the RIAA in 1985.

== Track listing ==
All tracks are written by Prince, except where noted.

Side 1
No.	Title	Writer(s)	Length
1.	"Nasty Girl"		5:10
2.	"Wet Dream"		4:12
3.	"Drive Me Wild"		2:31
4.	"He's So Dull"	Dez Dickerson	2:32

Side 6
No.	Title	Writer(s)	Length
5.	"If a Girl Answers (Don't Hang Up)"	Prince; Terry Lewis	5:34
6.	"Make-Up"		2:40
7.	"Bite the Beat"	Prince; Jesse Johnson	3:12
8.	"3 × 2 = 6"		5:24

== Personnel ==
- Vanity – lead (1, 2, 4, 5, 8) and backing vocals
- Brenda Bennett – lead (5, 7), co-lead (4) and backing vocals
- Susan Moonsie – lead (3, 6) and backing vocals
- Prince – lead vocals (5), Oberheim OB-Xa, Oberheim OB-SX, Oberheim OB-X, Yamaha CP-70 electric grand piano, electric guitars, bass guitar, Linn LM-1, drums, percussion, handclaps, Pearl SY-1 Syncussion
- Dez Dickerson – electric guitar (4), drums (4, 8)
- Terry Lewis – bass guitar (5)
- Jesse Johnson – electric guitar (7), Oberheim OB-SX (7), bass guitar (7)

== Charts ==
Chart (1982)	Peak position
US Billboard 200	45
US Top R&B/Hip-Hop Albums (Billboard)	6

== Certifications ==
Region	Certification	Certified units/sales
United States (RIAA)	Gold	500,000^{^}
^{^} Shipments figures based on certification alone.
