= Nasty Girl (Vanity 6 song) =

1982 single by Vanity 6

- Artwork for German and Dutch releases

Single by Vanity 6

from the album Vanity 6
- B-side: "Drive Me Wild"
- Released: September 24, 1982
- Recorded: Late March 1982
- Genre: Synth-funk; disco
- Length: 5:12 (LP version); 2:55 (single version)
- Label: Warner Bros.
- Songwriter: Prince
- Producer: Prince (as the Starr Company)

Vanity 6 singles chronology
"He's So Dull" (1982)	"Nasty Girl" (1982)	"Drive Me Wild" (1982)

Alternative release
- Side A of US 7-inch single

"Nasty Girl" is a song written and composed by American musician Prince. The song was first recorded by his protégée girl group Vanity 6 in 1982, who charted at number one on the US Billboard Dance/Disco Top 80 chart with their version. Prince gave the songwriting credit to lead singer Vanity, although he was the writer and composer. Inaya Day released a hit cover version of the song in 2005 that reached number nine on the UK Singles Chart. There have also been several other versions of this song.

== Release ==
"Nasty Girl" was originally recorded by Vanity 6 on the Warner Bros. Records label for their self-titled debut studio album Vanity 6. The song was produced by Prince and issued as the album's second single on September 24, 1982. Due to its explicit lyrics, "Nasty Girl" met with resistance on mainstream American radio and failed to appear on the US Billboard Hot 100 chart, peaking at number one on the Billboard Bubbling Under Hot 100 Singles chart. The song became a sizable hit on US R&B radio and reached number one on the Billboard Dance/Disco Top 80 chart for four weeks in November 1982. The song was knocked off the number-one position by Prince's own "1999."

"Nasty Girl" reached number five on the Dutch Top 40 and number 11 on the Belgian Ultratop chart in late 1982. Billboard named the song number 37 on their list of 100 Greatest Girl Group Songs of All Time. Lead singer Vanity, who later became a Christian preacher, subsequently denounced the song and told members of her congregation who listened to the song to "keep praying for the Holy Spirit".

== Track listing ==
US 7-inch

1. "Nasty Girl" (2:55)
2. "Drive Me Wild" (2:31)

== Personnel ==
Personnel is sourced from Prince Vault.

- Vanity – lead vocals
- Brenda Bennett & Susan Moonsie – backing vocals
- Prince – Yamaha CP-70 electric grand piano, Oberheim OB-X, electric guitar, bass guitar, Linn LM-1

== Charts ==
=== Weekly charts ===
Chart (1982)	Peak position
Belgium (Ultratop 50 Flanders)	11
Netherlands (Dutch Top 40)	5
Netherlands (Single Top 100)	7
US Bubbling Under Hot 100 (Billboard)	1
US Dance Club Songs (Billboard)	1
US Hot R&B/Hip-Hop Songs (Billboard)	7

=== Year-end charts ===
Chart (1982)	Position
Netherlands (Dutch Top 40)	73
Netherlands (Single Top 100)	61

== Inaya Day version ==
"Nasty Girl"

Single by Inaya Day
- Released: January 31, 2005
- Length: 4:57
- Label: Star 69
- Songwriter: Prince
- Producer: Mousse T.

Inaya Day singles chronology
"Stand by Me" (2004)	"Nasty Girl" (2005)	"The Glamorous Life" (2005)

=== Background and release ===
American singer Inaya Day recorded a cover version of "Nasty Girl". It first experienced success in Australian dance clubs the same year, peaking at number one on the ARIA Club Chart that December. The following month, a commercial single was released in Australia and peaked at number 18 on the ARIA Singles Chart in February 2005, remaining on the chart for 11 weeks. "Nasty Girl" was released in the United States, the United Kingdom, and Ireland later the same year, reaching number five on the US Billboard Dance Singles Sales chart, number nine on the UK Singles Chart, and number 42 on the Irish Singles Chart.

=== Track listings ===
1. "Nasty Girl" (Ivan Gough radio edit)
2. "Nasty Girl" (Mousse T & So Phat club mix)
3. "Nasty Girl" (John Course & Mr Timothy ReRub)
4. "Nasty Girl" (Luke Bowditch mix)
5. "Nasty Girl" (Phuture Grooves: Ajax & Damon Boyd mix)
6. "Nasty Girl" (Wei-Shen & Marcos mix)

=== Charts ===
==== Weekly charts ====
Chart (2004–2005)	Peak position
Australia (ARIA)	18
Australian Club Chart (ARIA)	1
Australian Dance (ARIA)	1
Belgium (Ultratop 50 Flanders)	12
Belgium (Ultratip Bubbling Under Wallonia)	10
Belgium Dance (Ultratop Flanders)	15
Ireland (IRMA)	42
Netherlands (Dutch Top 40)	32
Netherlands (Single Top 100)	44
Scottish Singles Sales (Official Charts)	9
UK Singles (Official Charts)	9
US Dance Club Songs (Billboard)	5
US Dance Singles Sales (Billboard)	5

==== Year-end charts ====
Chart (2004)	Position
Australian Club Chart (ARIA)	30

Chart (2005)	Position
Australian Club Chart (ARIA)	25
Australian Dance (ARIA)	13
UK Singles (OCC)	143

=== Release history ===
Region	Date	Format(s)	Label(s)	Ref(s).
Australia	January 31, 2005	CD	Vinyl Pusher	
United States	February 22, 2005	12-inch vinyl; CD	Star 69	
United Kingdom	July 11, 2005	CD	Peppermint Jam; Adhesive; All Around the World	

== In other media ==
=== In film ===
- The song appears the film Beverly Hills Cop.

== See also ==
- List of number-one dance hits (United States)
