= Sex Shooter =

Single by Apollonia 6

from the album Apollonia 6
- B-side: "In a Spanish Villa"
- Released: August 31, 1984
- Recorded: 1983
- Genre: Pop; dance; synth-funk
- Length: 3:39
- Label: Warner Bros.
- Songwriter: Prince (uncredited)
- Producer: Prince (as The Starr ★ Company)

Apollonia 6 singles chronology
"Sex Shooter" (1984)	"Blue Limousine" (1984)

Purple Rain singles chronology
Let's Go Crazy (1984)	Sex Shooter (1984)	Purple Rain (1984)

Music video
- "Sex Shooter" (TopPop, 1984) on YouTube

"Sex Shooter" is the debut single by Apollonia 6, released as a single in 1984. It appears on the group's only album. The song reached the top 20 of the US R&B Chart and was written and produced by Prince. A version performed by Prince appears on the 2019 posthumous demo album Originals.

The song was performed by Apollonia 6 in the 1984 film Purple Rain. It reached No. 19 on the US R&B Chart and No. 32 on the US Dance Chart and has since become a favorite of Prince protégé fans, while also being received more positively by a wider audience in retrospect. Billboard magazine ranked the song at No. 93 on their list of the 100 Greatest Girl Group Songs of All Time.

To promote the song, a music video was made which features the girls rehearsing the song in a dance studio and group members Apollonia and Brenda Bennett liking the same guy who joined them at rehearsal. The group also performed the song on music programs like TopPop. The full music video is available on the 20th anniversary DVD and Blu-ray editions of Purple Rain.

== Personnel ==
Credits sourced from Duane Tudahl.

- Apollonia – lead vocals
- Brenda Bennett – backing vocals
- Susan Moonsie – backing vocals (credited, but unsure of actual participation)
- Prince – Oberheim OB-8, Linn LM-1, cymbal

== Charts ==
Chart performance for "Sex Shooter"
Chart (1984)	Peak position
Belgium (Ultratop 50 Flanders)	15
Netherlands (Single Top 100)	16
US Billboard Hot 100	85
US Hot Dance Music/Club Play	32
US Hot R&B/Hip-Hop Songs	19

== Other versions ==
- Firefox released a more electropop version in 2007 which was signed to Ministry of Sound UK via 3Beat Records UK.
- T.H.E.M. Thee Human Ego Maniacs released an electroclash version as a single in 2003 off their album Bang. It was a club hit.
- Cahill featuring Nikki Belle released an electro house version of "Sex Shooter" in January 2009 via 3Beat REcords UK featuring sounds and production elements copied from the Firefox version they had signed 2 years earlier.
- Shannon also released a version of the song in 198?.
- American dance-pop singer Erika Jayne has also recorded a version of the song for her debut album Pretty Mess.
- Indie band Of Montreal has performed a cover of the song during multiple live performances. One of which frontman Kevin Barnes performed the song as a duet with Kid Sister.
- In 2019, the demo version by Prince was released on his posthumous album Originals.
