= The Mystic Warrior =

- Genre: Drama
- Based on: Hanta Yo by Ruth Beebe Hill
- Written by: Jeb Rosebrook
- Directed by: Richard T. Heffron
- Starring: Robert Beltran; Devon Ericson; Rion Hunter; James Remar; Apollonia Kotero; Branscombe Richmond; David Yanez
- Theme music composer: Gerald Fried
- Country of origin: United States
- Original language: English

Production
- Executive producers: Stan Margulie; David L. Wolper
- Producer: Paul Freeman
- Production locations: Lang Ranch, Thousand Oaks, California
- Cinematography: Stevan Larner
- Editor: Michael Eliot
- Running time: 300 min (including commercials)
- Production company: Warner Bros. Television

Original release
- Network: ABC
- Release: May 20 – May 21, 1984

The Mystic Warrior is a 1984 American TV movie about a band of Sioux and the efforts of one man to save his people from destruction through the use of mysterious powers handed down by ancestors. The movie was originally a nine-hour miniseries entitled Hanta Yo to be aired in 1980, instead aired in 1984 as a five-hour mini-series with the new name. The mini-series has been released on DVD in Germany, but no international release as yet.

== Plot ==
Set in the years 1802 to 1808, the finished film focused on a young brave named Ahbleza, the son of Olepi, chief of a fictional lakota-speaking tribe, the Mahto ('Bear'). Blessed with supernatural visionary powers by the ancient Mahto seer Wanagi, Ahbleza sets about to save his people from the devastations of the future, among them the invasion of the white man. After a lengthy, truth-seeking odyssey fraught with tragedy and sacrifice, Ahbleza assumes his rightful place as spiritual leader of his tribe.

== Cast ==
- Robert Beltran as Ahbleza
- Devon Ericson as Heyatawin
- David Yanez as Rion Hunter - Tonweya
- Brigitte Gault as Kippana
- Victoria Racimo as Napewaste
- Nick Ramus as Chief Olepi
- James Remar as Pesla
- Ned Romero as Wisa
- Apollonia Kotero as Wicahpi
- Branscombe Richmond as Miyaca
- Will Sampson as Wambli
- Doug Toby as Young Ahbleza
- Roger Campo as Young Pesla
- George Aguilar as Kungi Yuha Leader
- Ivan Naranjo as Ogle
- Frank Salsedo as Sinte (credited as Frank Sotonoma Salsedo)

== Production ==
The five-hour miniseries The Mystic Warrior began life in 1979 when producer David L. Wolper announced plans for a ten-hour adaptation of Hanta Yo, an epic historical novel by Ruth Beebe Hill. Using as her main source a full-blooded Sioux named Chunksa Yuha, Hill fashioned what amounted to a Native American version of Roots, chronicling the history of the fictional Matho (lakota: 'Bear') tribe of the Oglala Lakota Sioux. Although Hill's book was a bestseller and received rave reviews in the first year of its publication, it was attacked and discredited by numerous Indian historians, teachers, and activists, who accused Hill of distorting and falsifying truths in order to promote her and Yuha's own sociopolitical agendas (Hill was particularly influenced by the works of Ayn Rand, to which critics such as author and Native American activist Vine Deloria, Jr. and anthropologist of Northern Plains peoples Raymond J. DeMallie compared Hanta Yo, and critics also called Yuha's background into question). Suddenly, all of the Native American support that had been promised to the miniseries version of Hanta Yo evaporated. When the project finally aired on May 20 through 21, 1984, its running time (and budget) had been cut in half, and the producer was obliged to qualify the credits by noting that the teleplay was based partially on Hill's book, but mostly on "other sources". The filming location had to be changed from New Mexico to Thousand Oaks, California, so as not to offend the Indian tribes in the former state.
