= Apollonia Kotero =

American singer and actress (born 1959)

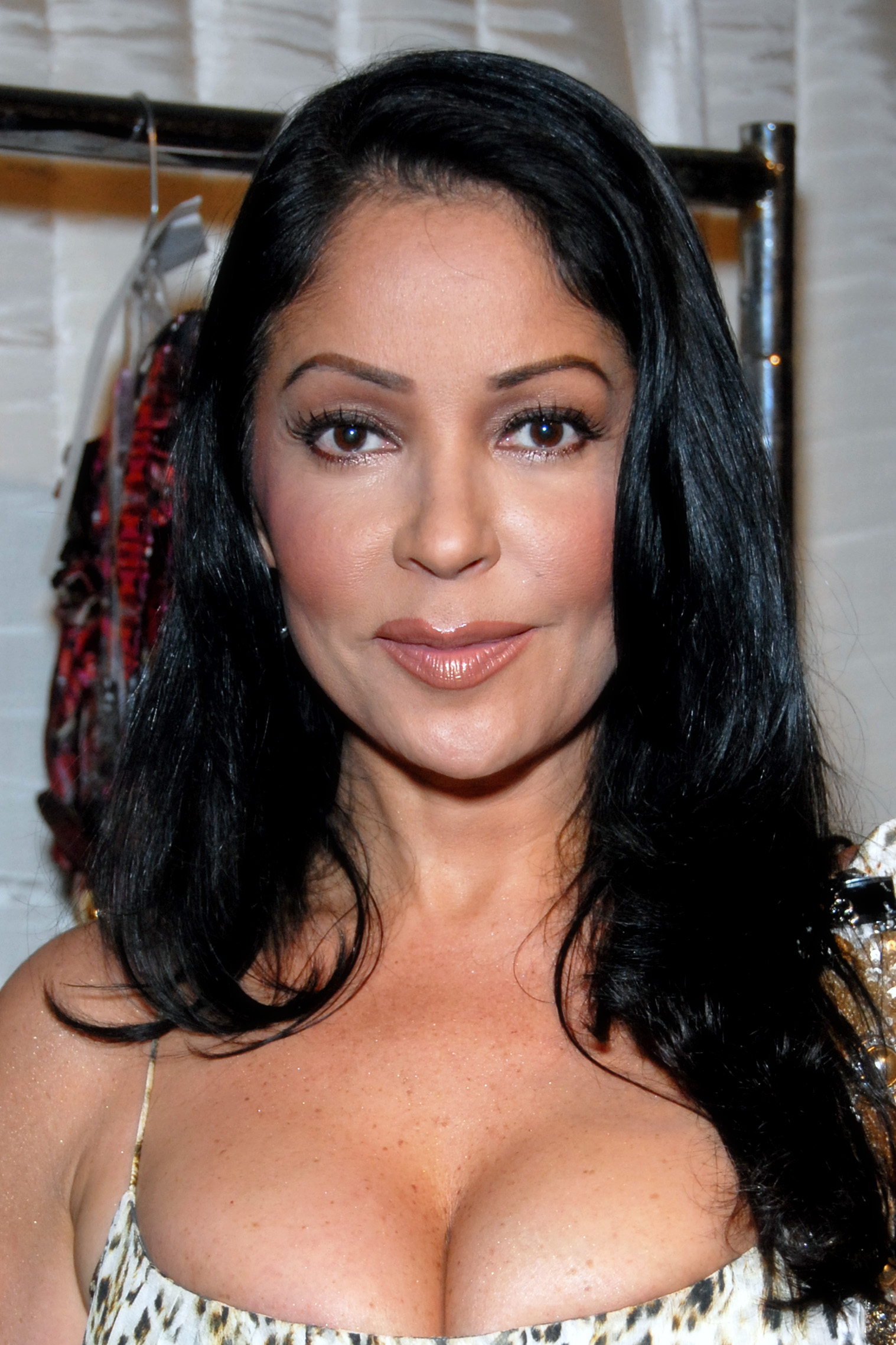
- Kotero at the Los Angeles Fashion Week in 2008
- Born: Patricia Kotero; August 2, 1959 (age 67); Los Angeles, California, U.S.
- Other name: Apollonia
- Occupations: Actress; singer; model
- Known for: Purple Rain; Falcon Crest
- Spouse: Kevin Bernhardt (m. 1987–1997)
- Musical career
- Genres: Pop; dance; funk; R&B
- Instrument: Vocals
- Years active: 1979–present
- Formerly of: Apollonia 6

Patricia Apollonia Kotero (born August 2, 1959) is an American actress, singer, and former model. She is known for co-starring in Prince's 1984 film Purple Rain and for having been the lead singer of the girl group Apollonia 6.

== Early life ==
Kotero was born in San Pedro, California, the daughter of immigrants from Mexico, and the eldest of four children. Her father, Victor, was a restaurant manager, and her mother, Socorro, was a caregiver for the elderly. She dropped out of high school at 16 to pursue a career as a model.

== Career ==
=== Early career ===
Kotero worked as an actress, singer, and model. After winning the Miss San Pedro beauty competition, and following her stint as a cheerleader for the Los Angeles Rams in the early 1980s, Kotero began acting in film and television series such as CHiPs, Tales of the Gold Monkey, Fantasy Island, Matt Houston, and Knight Rider. In September 1982, she appeared in the music video "Shakin'" by Eddie Money. In May 1984, she appeared in the ABC television film The Mystic Warrior as the Native American woman Wicahpi. While dating Van Halen singer David Lee Roth on and off when they were both in Los Angeles, she auditioned for Purple Rain. Roth had followed her modeling career and hired her for a Star of the Cars magazine cover.

=== Prince and Purple Rain ===
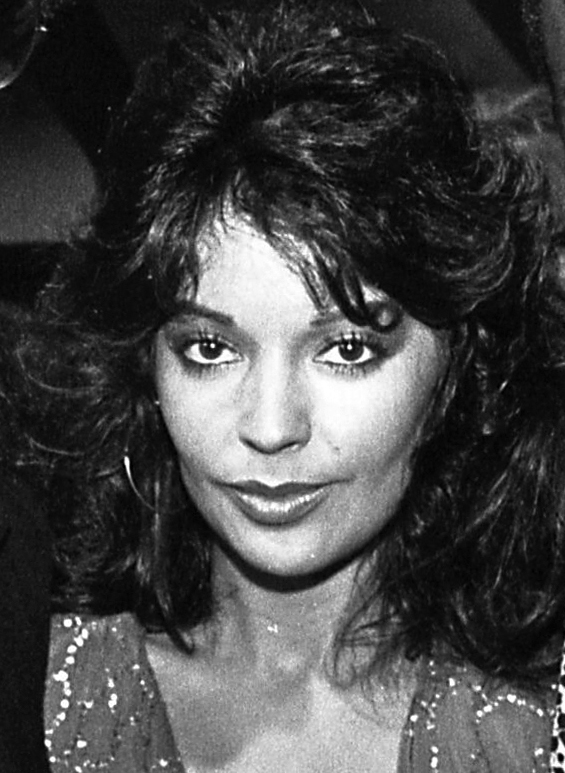
Kotero in 1984

When then-leader of Vanity 6, Denise "Vanity" Matthews, resigned from its membership before Prince's 1984 film Purple Rain was filmed, Kotero landed the film's female lead role. Vanity 6, which was renamed Apollonia 6 for the film, also featured supporting singers Brenda Bennett and Prince's then-girlfriend Susan Moonsie. Apollonia 6 embarked on a worldwide tour to promote their hit single "Sex Shooter".

Prince's song "Take Me with U" featured vocals by Kotero, with help from Lisa Coleman and Jill Jones, and it reached number 25 on the Billboard Top 40 chart in the United States.

In 1985, Kotero left Prince's camp to appear on the series Falcon Crest, playing Apollonia, the girlfriend of the character played by Lorenzo Lamas. She performed several solo songs, including "Red Light Romeo", written and composed by Jon Lind.

=== Later career ===
In 1988, Warner Bros. Records released Kotero's eponymously titled first solo album, Apollonia. Three singles were taken from the album: "Since I Fell for You", "The Same Dream" and "Mismatch".

She went on to appear in such films as Ministry of Vengeance (1989), Back to Back (1990), Black Magic Woman (1991), and two Italian productions: La Donna di una Sera (A Lady for a Night) (1991) and Cattive Ragazze (1992). She returned to television on such shows as Sliders and Air America (which co-starred Lorenzo Lamas, her former co-star in Falcon Crest), and also hosted The Jazz Channel's Latin Beat program. During this period an exercise video entitled Go for It was also released. Kotero could also be seen on E!'s Celebrity Homes, The Test, Rendezview, and MTV Cribs, with her friend Carmen Electra.

In 2005, Kotero formed a multimedia entertainment company, Kotero Entertainment, which enlisted a number of producers to produce a children's animated television series as well as feature films. Kotero Entertainment also began managing young talent such as television and film star Sascha Andres and young pop singer Nikki Barreras, also known as Nikki B.

In 2009, Kotero's vocals appeared on The Twilight Singers cover of Prince's "When Doves Cry" for Spin magazine's 25th anniversary tribute to the Purple Rain album, Purplish Rain.

Kotero sued Prince's estate, Paisley Park Enterprises, in August 2025 over the trademark rights of her stage name Apollonia after the estate filed for the trademark and requested that the trademark Kotero obtained in 2016 be cancelled. Prince's estate said the name originated for a character Prince created for the film Purple Rain, and Kotero's trademark blocked them from selling merchandise using the Apollonia 6 name, and they had no intent to block her from performing under the name. Kotero stated that Prince encouraged her to use the name and only she had been actively using it for previous four decades.

=== Apollonia Studio 6 ===
In January 2022, Apollonia and her business partner Seth Neblett launched their YouTube podcast Apollonia Studio 6. Over their last two seasons, they hosted guests such as Jill Jones, Gabriel "Fluffy" Iglesias, JoKoy, Apollonia 6, Tia Carrere, André Cymone, Joe Isgro, Diana-Maria Riva, Susannah Melvoin, DJ Vlad, Amanda Wyss, Anna Fantastic, LeRoy "Roy" Bennett, Autumn Rowe, and Duane Tudahl. The podcast received a Telly Award in 2023.

As of January 2024, the podcast has amassed 500,000 views and 10,000 subscribers.

== Personal life ==
Apollonia dated rock singer David Lee Roth during the filming of Purple Rain. She was married to actor, screenwriter, and director Kevin Bernhardt from 1987 to 1997.

== Discography ==
=== Studio albums ===
- Apollonia (1988)

=== with Apollonia 6 ===
- Apollonia 6 (1984)

=== Singles ===
Title	Release	Peak chart positions			Album
Title	Release	US	US Dance	US R&B	Album
"Take Me with U" (with Prince)	1985	25	—	40	Purple Rain
"Since I Fell for You"	1988	—	6	—	Apollonia
"Mismatch"	1989	—	22	—	Apollonia
"The Same Dream"	1989	—	31	—	Apollonia

- The "Take Me with U" duet reached No. 7 in the United Kingdom, becoming Kotero's only chart entry in the country.

== Filmography ==
=== Film ===
Year	Title	Role	Notes
1979	La mafia de la frontera	Girl in Bikini	
1980	Tricks of the Trade	Frank	(as Patty Kotero)
1980	Amor ciego	Patty (as Patty Kotero)	
1983	Heartbreaker	Rose	(as Patty Kotero)
1984	The Mystic Warrior	Wicahpi	TV movie (as Patty Kotero)
1984	Purple Rain	Apollonia	
1989	Ministry of Vengeance	Zarah	
1989	Back to Back	Jesse Duro	
1991	Black Magic Woman	Cassandra Perry	
1992	A Woman's Secret	Barbara	(as Apollonia)
1992	Cattive ragazze	Esmerelda	
1998	Anarchy TV	Hot Tub Woman (as Apollonia)	
2006	The Divorce Ceremony	Sophia	

=== Television ===
Year	Title	Role	Notes
1982	CHiPs	Barbara	Episode: "Alarmed" (as Patti Kotero)
1983	Tales of the Gold Monkey	Native Girl	Episode: "Force of Habit" (as Patty Kotero)
1983	Fantasy Island	Iya	Episode: "Love Island/The Sisters" (as Patty Kotero)
1983	Matt Houston	Gilda Rivera	Episode: "The Centerfold Murders"
1984	Knight Rider	Tiara D'Arcy	Episode: "Mouth of the Snake" (as Patty Kotero)
1984	Late Night with David Letterman	Herself	Episode dated December 3, 1984
1985–86	Falcon Crest	Apollonia	Recurring cast: season 5
1987	Fantastico 8	Herself	4 episodes
1988	Showtime at the Apollo	Herself - Host	Episode S2.E9
1989	American Bandstand	Herself	Episode S32.E5
1989	Soul Train	Herself	Episode S18.E22
1997	Sliders	Dr. Deera Mubaric	Episode: "Slide Like an Egyptian" (as Apollonia)
1998	Air America	Lucy Ortega	Episode: "Crosshairs" (as Apollonia)
2001	The Goods	Herself	Episode: "Fashion Crimes"
2002	VH-1 Where Are They Now?	Herself	Episode: "Girls, Girls, Girls"
2002	I Love the '80s	Herself	7 episodes
2003	The Wayne Brady Show	Herself	Episode dated December 12, 2003
2014	Life with La Toya	Herself	2 episodes
2015	Oprah: Where Are They Now?	Herself (as Apollonia)	Episode: "Oprah Talks to Andrea Yates' Husband; Actress Angie Harmon & Apollonia"
