= Jill Jones (album) =

Studio album by Jill Jones
- Released: May 19, 1987
- Recorded: July 1982–October 1986
- Studio: Paisley Park, Chanhassen, Minnesota, US; Sunset Sound, Hollywood, California; Electric Lady, New York City, New York
- Genre: R&B, pop
- Length: 39:06
- Label: Paisley Park/Warner Bros. Records; 25575
- Producer: Prince, David Z, Jill Jones

Jill Jones chronology
Jill Jones (1987)	'Two' (2001)

Singles from Jill Jones
- 1. "Mia Bocca" Released: 1987; 2. "G-Spot" Released: 1987; 3. "For Love" Released: 1987

Jill Jones is the self-titled debut solo album from the artist of the same name. The album was released in 1987 on Paisley Park/Warner Bros. Records. It was produced by Jones and Prince.

Her debut was warmly received in Europe, but failed to chart in the U.S. on the Billboard Top 100 Pop, Black, or Dance charts. None of the three released singles managed to enter any of the Top 100 charts. Warner Bros. Records never pushed the album.

== Background ==
In 1983, Jones moved to Minneapolis to begin work on her solo album. Prince spent three years working with his protégé. Prince wrote and performed much of the music on the album, while Jones sang all of the vocals. David Z. did a large portion of the audio engineering and music production (without Prince) at Electric Lady Studios in New York City.

In the book Prince and the Parade & Sign O' The Times Era Sessions, Jones was quoted as saying she and David Z had a lot of latitude when it came to their sound. "I think Prince also trusted me to go my way, because once Miles Davis actually gave it the stamp of approval. We played it for him, and it was kind of finished once Miles heard it technically. Prince told me, 'Miles loves you, he just loves you.'"

Lead single "Mia Bocca" became a top 10 hit in Italy in July 1987, peaking at #6. Further single releases "G-Spot" and "For Love" failed to chart.

Two other songs written by Prince, "77 Bleeker St." and "Baby Cries (Ay Yah)", were issued as B-sides. Billy Idol guitarist Steve Stevens, who was a close friend of Jones, contributed to the album.

The album is out of print.

== Track listing ==
All songs composed by Prince. (Note: On the original album release, Jill Jones is either credited as a sole writer or co-writer for most of the tracks. However, most of the tracks were recorded without any prior input from Jones)

=== Side 1 ===
No.	Title	Length
1.	"Intro (Baby You're a Trip)"	1:25
2.	"Mia Bocca"	5:56
3.	"G-Spot"	4:30
4.	"Violet Blue" (with Darlene Koldenhoven)	4:24
5.	"With You" (with Steve Stevens)	4:00

- The music for "Mia Bocca" was heard in Prince's 1986 movie Under the Cherry Moon
- "G-Spot" was originally recorded by Prince & the Revolution in 1983, and was intended for a scene in Purple Rain along with "Electric Intercourse," but was replaced by "The Beautiful Ones"
- "With You" was recorded by Prince on his 1979 album Prince

=== Side 2 ===
No.	Title	Length
6.	"All Day, All Night" (with The Revolution)	5:41
7.	"For Love" (with The Family)	4:27
8.	"My Man"	3:15
9.	"Baby, You're a Trip"	5:23

- the Family: a Prince protégé band that recorded one album in 1985. St Paul Peterson (bass guitar), Jellybean Johnson (drums-also drummer for the Time band), and Eric Leeds (saxophone) feature on the track
- the Revolution: Prince (guitar), Bobby Z (drums), Dr Fink (keyboards), Lisa Coleman (keyboards), Brown Mark (bass guitar), Wendy Melvoin (guitar). The song was originally recorded live at First Avenue in June 1984 with Prince on lead vocals.

=== Album 12" Singles ===
Mia Bocca

No.	Title	Length
1.	"Mia Bocca" (Extended Version)	6:04
2.	"Mia Bocca" (Dub Version)	5:48
3.	"77 Bleeker St."	4:34

G-Spot

No.	Title	Length
1.	"G-Spot" (Extended Version, Prince Mix)	6:22
2.	"Baby Cries (Ay Yah)" (Extended Version)	6:44

For Love

No.	Title	Length
1.	"For Love" (4-Play Remix)	7:29
2.	"For Love" (Bonus Beats)	4:55

== Personnel ==
- Jill Jones – lead and backing vocals
- Prince – backing vocals (7), electric and acoustic guitars, Fairlight CMI, Yamaha DX7, Oberheim OB-8, synthesizers, piano, bass guitar, Linn LM-1, drums, percussion
- Jellybean Johnson – drums (7)
- St. Paul Peterson – bass guitar (7)
- Eric Leeds – saxophone (4, 7)
- Atlanta Bliss – trumpet (4)
- Wendy Melvoin – electric guitar (6)
- Lisa Coleman – synthesizers (6)
- Dr. Fink – synthesizers (6)
- Brownmark – bass guitar (6)
- Bobby Z. – Simmons SDSV, Linn LM-1 and Pearl SY-1 Syncussion (6)
- Steve Stevens – electric guitar (5)
- Hugh McCracken – electric guitar (5)
- Rob Mounsey – piano (5)
- Mike Chase – keyboards (5)
- Steve Gadd – drums (5)
- Bob Minzer – saxophone (3)
- Chris Hunter – saxophone (3)
- Roger Rosenberg – saxophone (3)
- Jim Pugh – trombone (3)
- Jon Faddis – trumpet (3)
- Randy Brecker – trumpet (3)
- Clare Fischer – orchestral arrangements (1, 2, 4, 9)

== Charts ==
=== Singles ===
Year	Single	Chart	Position
1987	"Mia Bocca"	Italy Airplay (Music & Media)	4
1987	"Violet Blue"	Italy Airplay (Music & Media)	1
