= Vanity 6 =

American musical group

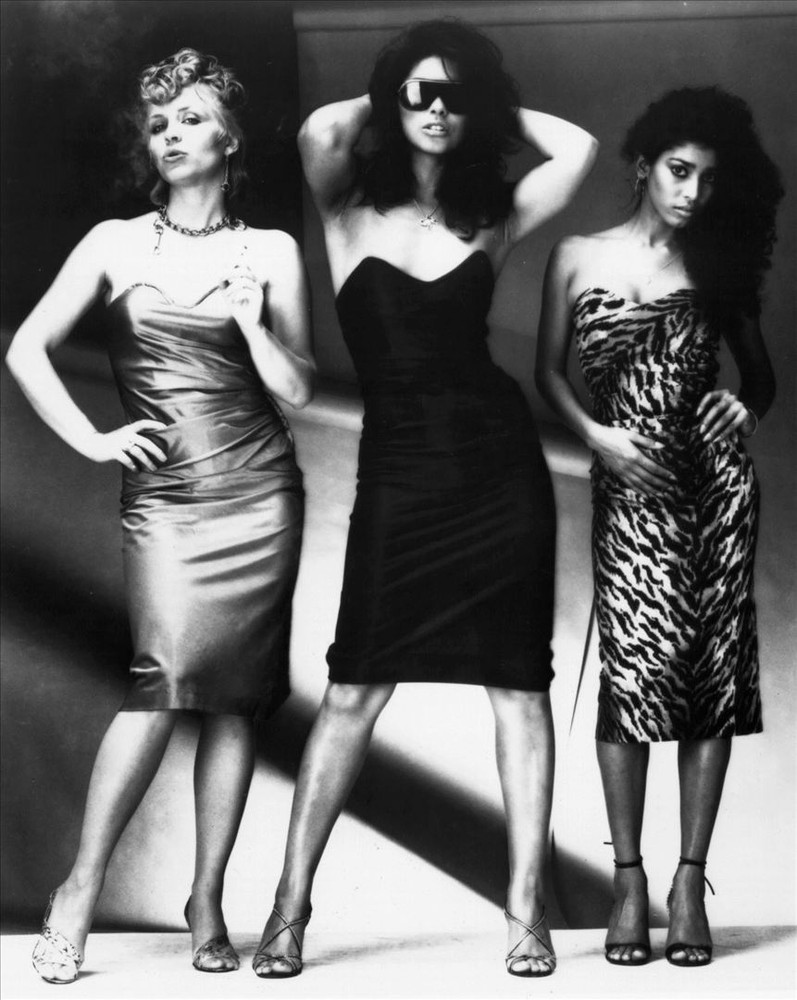
- Left to right: Brenda Bennett, Vanity, and Susan Moonsie (1982).

Background information
- Origin: Minneapolis, Minnesota, U.S.
- Genres: R&B; pop; funk; rock; synth-pop
- Years active: 1982–1983
- Label: Warner Bros.
- Past members: Vanity; Brenda Bennett; Susan Moonsie

Vanity 6 was an American female vocal trio that gained popularity in the early 1980s. They were protégées of musician Prince. Led by singer Vanity, they are known for their song "Nasty Girl". Vanity left in 1983 and the band was reformed as Apollonia 6.

== History ==
=== Formation ===
In 1981, Prince, himself a rising musical star, suggested that Susan Moonsie and her sister Loreen, along with Cavallo, Ruffalo & Fargnoli employee Jamie Shoop form a girl group that would be called the Hookers. Prince's vision was that the three women would perform in lingerie and sing sensual songs with lyrics about sex, romance, and fantasy. Later, musician Rick James claimed that Prince had stolen the idea for creating a sexy trio in negligees who sang about love, pain, money, and power from him while Prince was the opening act on James's tour in 1980. Set designer Roy Bennett's wife Brenda Bennett, who later joined the group stated that Prince was looking to create a somewhat "1980s version of The Supremes."

The original trio recorded a few demos before Prince knew that Canadian model and B movie actress Denise Matthews could sing. He met her at the American Music Awards in 1982. Prince was so taken by her charisma that he decided she would be the perfect lead vocalist for his group the Hookers. He also suggested that Matthews use the stage name Vagina. She agreed to be part of the act, but insisted that the name of the group be changed from the Hookers, and that she would not use the stage name Vagina. They settled on her stage name as Vanity and the group's name became Vanity 6. Prince chose the name because he said that looking at her was like looking in a mirror at the female version of himself. Around this time, Prince and Vanity began a romantic relationship. Loreen and Jamie were not in the group, and with Vanity's arrival, that left Vanity 6 with Vanity on lead vocals, Brenda Bennett and Susan Moonsie on backing vocals. Prince provided the group, now dressed in lingerie and high heels, with provocative songs (although within the album credits, group members were sometimes given writing credits).

=== Career ===
Their first single, "He's So Dull", failed to chart on the main US Hot 100 chart but was a minor hit in Australia and the Netherlands; it appeared in the film National Lampoon's Vacation.

The second single, "Nasty Girl", was also not a hit on the US Hot 100, but did become a hit on the U.S. R&B chart, hitting number 7, and the U.S. Dance chart, hitting number one. The song was a top 10 hit in the Netherlands, and a top 20 hit in the Flanders region of Belgium. "Nasty Girl" was featured in the film Beverly Hills Cop, although it was not included on the soundtrack. It was also featured in the 1983 sex comedy film Private School and the 1996 black comedy film Girl 6.

The third single, "Drive Me Wild", was another minor hit. Music videos were shot for all three singles. Their first and only album, Vanity 6, was eventually certified gold. Members of the group sometimes provided backing vocals on Prince's albums. The group was the opening act of Prince's 1999 tour for his album with the same name in 1982 and 1983, which also featured The Time.

The hierarchy in the group caused friction between Vanity and Bennett. Prince often put Bennett in charge of rehearsals and checking Vanity's vocals when Vanity saw herself as the one in charge of the group. Vanity appeared in a Richard Avedon photoshoot with Prince with one of the photos being used on the cover of the April 28, 1983 issue of Rolling Stone magazine. The issue also contained a two-page Avedon photo of Vanity 6. In 1983, Vanity recorded demos for a number of new songs, including "Sex Shooter", intended for the ill-fated second Vanity 6 album. During pre-production of the movie Purple Rain in August 1983, Vanity decided to leave the group and relinquish her role in the film. Many possible reasons were given for her departure, such as disbursement of royalties, Prince being too controlling, and the end of their romantic relationship.

=== Post-Vanity 6 ===
Vanity was replaced by Apollonia in the group, which was renamed Apollonia 6. She also took over Vanity's role in the film Purple Rain. The new trio recorded their only album, Apollonia 6, in 1984.

Former front woman Vanity went on to have a solo music and acting career. In 1994, Vanity overdosed on crack cocaine and suffered from near-fatal kidney failure. Upon recovering, she became a born again Christian and renounced her stage name and her career in show business. She died from kidney disease on February 15, 2016. Moonsie went on to work as a realtor and later became a restaurateur.

== Discography ==
=== Studio albums ===
- Vanity 6 (1982)

=== Singles ===
List of singles, with selected chart positions
Title (A-side/B-side)	Year	Peak chart positions						Album
Title (A-side/B-side)	Year	US	US R&B	US Dance	AUS	BEL (FL)	NLD	Album
"He's So Dull" "Make-Up"	1982	—	—	—	92	—	44	Vanity 6
"Nasty Girl" "Drive Me Wild"	1982	101	7	1	—	11	7	Vanity 6
"Bite the Beat" "3 × 2 = 6"	1983	—	—	—	—	—	—	Vanity 6
"Drive Me Wild" "3 × 2 = 6"	1983	—	—	—	—	—	—	Vanity 6
"—" denotes a recording that did not chart or was not released in that territory.

=== Unreleased second Vanity 6 album ===
A number of songs were intended for the Vanity 6 follow up album, but due to Vanity's departure, these songs ended up performed by others.

- "Sex Shooter", which was released by Apollonia 6. Vanity 6 did record at least one version of this song which has been leaked on the internet.
- "17 Days", the B-side to Prince's "When Doves Cry", ended up being released by Prince, with Bennett's background vocals still on the recording.
- "G-Spot", which ended up on Jill Jones' debut album. The Vanity 6/Prince with Jill Jones background vocals demo has been leaked on the internet as well.
- "Vibrator", which has been leaked online. The song features Prince in a comedic sketch as well as Jill Jones. It is about Vanity feeling ignored by her lover only to find solace with her "body massager" which midway through the song loses power prompting Vanity to go purchase batteries at two different stores. The song is set in three distinct parts: The verse and chorus portions, then the comedic sketch, and finally, Vanity achieving an orgasm with her vibrator. Vanity's vocal track from this song would later be reused by Prince in 1994 for the Come (Prince album) on the outro track "Orgasm", the final part of a full track "Poem" which is heard throughout the duration of the album. She is credited in the liner notes as "She knows..." by Prince.
- "Moral Majority"

== See also ==
- List of artists who reached number one on the US Dance chart
