= One Inch Punch =

American alternative rock duo

- Origin: Los Angeles, California, U.S.
- Genres: Alternative rock
- Years active: 1995–1997
- Labels: Hut Records; EMI UK
- Past members: Justin Warfield; Gianni Garofalo

One Inch Punch (a.k.a. One-Inch-Punch) was an American alternative rock duo from Los Angeles, California, United States, consisting of former Justin Warfield Supernaut members Justin Warfield and Gianni Garofalo, with Warfield now being part of the post-punk revival music duo She Wants Revenge.

== Biography ==
The band, often erroneously assumed to be named after the one inch punch technique made famous by Bruce Lee, was actually named after an office supply frontsman Justin Warfield saw while looking for inspiration at the office supply store Staples. The band was officially formed in 1995 and found some success in the UK. Its only album, Tao of the One Inch Punch, was released in September 1996 on Hut Records.

The group's song "Pretty Piece of Flesh" was featured on the Romeo + Juliet soundtrack, and the track "Gemini" was featured on The Edukators soundtrack.

== Discography ==
Tao of the One Inch Punch

Studio album by One Inch Punch
- Released: 1996
- Length: 34:52
- Label: Hut Records
- Producers: Gianni Garofalo, Justin Warfield

One Inch Punch chronology
Secrets of the One Inch Punch (1995)	''Tao of the One Inch Punch'' (1996)

Singles from Tao of the One Inch Punch
- 1. "If" Released: 1997; 2. "Angela Davis" Released: 1997

Tao of the One Inch Punch is the first and only album released by the band in 1996.

== Track listing ==
1. "Just Enough" – 3:29
2. "Gemini" – 3:58
3. "Latitudes" – 1:35
4. "Represent" – 2:55
5. "The Bu" – 3:30
6. "Take It in Stride" – 3:44
7. "Metaphysics" – 3:12
8. "Wallflower" – 4:20
9. "Orson Welles' Martians" – 4:41
10. "If" – 3:31

== Appearances in media ==
- "Pretty Piece of Flesh" was featured on the Romeo + Juliet soundtrack
- "Gemini" was featured on The Edukators soundtrack (2004).
