= American Edit =

Remix album by Dean Gray
- Released: November 18, 2005
- Genre: Plunderphonics
- Length: 48:35
- Label: Self-released

Singles from American Edit
- 1. "Boulevard of Broken Songs" Released: Late 2004

Professional ratings
Review scores
Source	Rating
PopMatters	7/10 stars
Punknews.org	4/5 stars

American Edit is a mashup album released by Party Ben and Team9 under the shared alias Dean Gray. Its primary basis is the Green Day album American Idiot—the name "Dean Gray" is a spoonerism of "Green Day".

== Release and aftermath ==
The album was an internet-only release with no intent of commercial gain; Dean Gray asked fans who enjoyed the album to donate to charities Green Day had been known to support. Nevertheless, only 10 days after its November 18, 2005, release, the American Edit website was shut down, reportedly after receiving a cease and desist order from Green Day's label, Warner Records, despite Green Day singer Billie Joe Armstrong having called the project "really cool". The website returned online soon after but without inclusion of the music.

Despite the cease and desist, the album endured through word of mouth and fan protests staged in support of the album. Following the shutdown, 91X, a radio station in San Diego, aired the entire album. Soon after, on December 13, 2005, a fan-organized event referred to as "Dean Gray Tuesday" (a reference to 2004's Grey Tuesday) was staged as a protest against the shutdown, in which the album was uploaded to a number of participating websites as torrents, direct MP3 downloads or ZIP archives. Video clips of "Dr. Who on Holiday", "American Jesus", and "Boulevard of Broken Songs" were also made available. The shutdown and protest contributed to international press coverage beyond the music industry.

An edited, four-song version of American Edit was performed as a "mashup rock opera" at the Bootie 3-Year Anniversary Party at DNA Lounge in San Francisco on August 11, 2006. Entitled Dean Gray – American Edit: The Theatrical Experience, the show – presented by the band Smash-Up Derby and starring performance artist Foxy Cotton – was a combination of live music, theatre, and visuals.

In 2008 an unofficial extended version of the album was released online at The Pirate Bay. Subtitled "Deluxe Edition 2008", this version of the album featured the same original 11 tracks plus and additional 4 new songs, "Can't Get a Life", "Country Basket", "I Like American Idiots", and "Greenday Triple Tracker", from DJ Pegasus, who had no part in the original album. All songs in the 2008 Deluxe edition also had their volume level raised in order to be more in-line with the original album's volume level This version also included a slightly altered version of "Ashanti's Letterbomb" in the place of the version from the original American Edit.

The track "The Bad Homecoming" would precipitate an actual collaboration between U2 and Green Day in 2006: a cover of "The Saints Are Coming". On August 10, 2009, the song was played by DJ Adam-12 of Boston's WBCN during the station's four-day farewell to analog broadcasting.

== Track listing ==
1. "American Jesus" – 8:40
  1. "American Idiot"
  2. "Jesus' Tears"
  3. "Summer of the Damned"
  4. "Suburban Ring"
  5. "It's Like That"
  - Samples – Green Day, "American Idiot", "Jesus of Suburbia"
  - Samples – Ray Charles, "I Got a Woman"
  - Samples – Kanye West, "Gold Digger"
  - Samples – Smokey Robinson, "The Tears of a Clown"
  - Samples – Bryan Adams, "Summer of '69"
  - Samples – Johnny Cash, "Ring of Fire"
  - Samples – John F. Kennedy's inaugural address ("ask not what your country can do for you")
  - Samples – "George Bush Doesn't Care About Black People" by The Legendary KO, a mash-up of Kanye West's "Gold Digger" and West's comments about George W. Bush.
  - Samples – Mariah Carey, "It's Like That"
2. "Dr. Who on Holiday" – 4:57
  - Samples – Speech by George W. Bush, (January 3, 2003, Fort Hood, Texas)
  - Samples – Speech by the Daleks, (from episode 6 of Genesis of the Daleks)
  - Samples – Green Day, "Holiday"
  - Samples – The Timelords, "Doctorin' the Tardis"
  - Samples – Gary Glitter, "Rock and Roll Part 2"
  - Samples – Ron Grainer (arranged by Delia Derbyshire), Doctor Who theme music (sample from within "Doctorin' the Tardis")
3. "Boulevard of Broken Songs" – 4:42
  - Samples – Green Day, "Boulevard of Broken Dreams"
  - Samples – Green Day, "American Idiot"
  - Samples – Additional vocals by Missy Elliott (from Madonna's "American Life (Missy Elliott Remix)")
  - Samples – Oasis, "Wonderwall"
  - Samples – Travis, "Writing to Reach You"
  - Samples – Aerosmith, "Dream On"
4. "The Bad Homecoming (Waiting)" – 3:25
  - Samples – Green Day, "Homecoming"
  - Samples – Green Day, "Are We the Waiting"
  - Samples – U2, "Bad"
  - Samples – U2, "Sometimes You Can't Make It on Your Own"
5. "St. Jimmy the Prankster" – 2:22
  - Samples – Green Day, "St. Jimmy"
  - Samples – The Offspring, "Original Prankster"
  - Samples – Adam Freeland, "We Want Your Soul"
  - Samples – Bill Hicks, Monologue, (Dominion Theater, London, November, 1992)
  - Samples – Bryan Ferry, "Let's Stick Together"
6. "Novocaine Rhapsody" – 4:18
  - Samples – U2, "Bullet the Blue Sky"
  - Samples – Green Day, "Give Me Novacaine"
  - Samples – Queen, "Bohemian Rhapsody"
7. "Impossible Rebel" – 2:05
  - Samples – Green Day, "She’s a Rebel"
  - Samples – Theme song to Mission: Impossible
  - Samples – Sex Pistols, "God Save the Queen"
  - Samples – Speech by George W. Bush
  - Samples – Dire Straits, "Money for Nothing"
  - Samples – Deep Purple, "Smoke on the Water" (riff)
8. "Ashanti's Letterbomb" – 4:32
  - Samples – Green Day, "Letterbomb"
  - Samples – Ashanti, "Only U"
  - Samples – Buffalo Springfield, "For What It's Worth"
  - Samples – The Who, "Who Are You"
9. "Greenday Massacre" – 3:43
  - Samples – Green Day, "Wake Me Up When September Ends"
  - Samples – The Eagles, "Lyin' Eyes"
  - Samples – Depeche Mode, "Just Can't Get Enough"
  - Samples – The Beatles, "A Day in the Life"
  - Samples – The Beatles, "Blackbird"
  - Samples – Talking Heads, "Road to Nowhere"
  - Samples – Additional vocals by Tim McGraw (from "Over and Over" by Nelly f/ Tim McGraw)
10. "Whatsername (Susanna Hoffs)" – 3:28
  - Samples – Green Day, "Whatsername"
  - Samples – The Bangles, "Manic Monday"

=== Original bonus track ===
1. "Boulevard of Broken Songs (Dance Mix)" – 6:19

=== Bonus tracks from American Edit Deluxe 2008 ===
1. "Boulevard of Broken Songs (Dance Mix)" – 6:19
2. "Can't Get a Life" – 2:05
  - Samples – Green Day, "Good Riddance (Time of Your Life)"
  - Samples – Depeche Mode, "Just Can't Get Enough"
3. "Country Basket" – 2:55
  - Samples – Green Day, "Basket Case"
  - Samples – Nelly, "Country Grammar (Hot Shit)"
4. "I Like American Idiots" – 5:18
  - Samples – Green Day, "American Idiot"
  - Samples – BodyRockers, "I Like the Way"
5. "Greenday Triple Tracker" – 7:39
  - Samples – Green Day, "Boulevard of Broken Dreams"
  - Samples – Green Day, "Holiday"
  - Samples – Green Day, "American Idiot"
