= Black Magic Woman (film) =

- VHS Jacket for the 1991 home release featuring the tagline "Evil has never been more erotic".
- Directed by: Deryn Warren
- Written by: Jerry Daly; Marc Springer; Deryn Warren
- Starring: Apollonia Kotero; Mark Hamill; Amanda Wyss
- Cinematography: Levie Isaacks
- Edited by: Tony Miller
- Music by: Randy Miller
- Production company: Vidmark
- Distributed by: Trimark Pictures
- Release date: April 17, 1991
- Running time: 1 hour, 31 minutes
- Country: United States
- Language: English

Black Magic Woman is a 1991 erotic thriller film that was directed by Deryn Warren, based on a script co-written with Jerry Daly and Marc Springer. Starring Mark Hamill, Apollonia Kotero, and Amanda Wyss, the film centers upon a womanizer who believes himself to be the victim of black magic.

== Synopsis ==
The film follows Brad, the successful owner of an art gallery he co-owns with his girlfriend Diane. He is also a serial womanizer who treats his one night stands as nothing more than conquests to be won and discarded the next day. This frustrates Diane, who wants him to propose.

One night Brad meets Cassandra, a beautiful and mysterious woman who he quickly seduces and takes home for a night of passion. The following day Brad treats her as he has the other women, which angers Cassandra. Brad begins to experience a run of bad luck and strange phenomena. He also finds himself still drawn to Cassandra despite wanting her out of his life. As his life begins to fall apart Brad becomes convinced that Cassandra has been using black magic on him to hold his attention and punish him when he does not do what she wants, particularly after he is diagnosed with leukemia. He eventually has a confrontation with Cassandra that ends in her death.

It is ultimately revealed to the viewer that Diane and her mother were the ones who had been cursing him. They had grown impatient with his unwillingness to propose, particularly after Brad had shown more than a passing interest in Cassandra. Brad reconciles with Diane and proposes, unaware of her role in his misfortune.

== Cast ==
- Mark Hamill as Brad Travis
- Apollonia Kotero as Cassandra Perry
- Amanda Wyss as Diane Abbott
- Stella Pacific as Ida Coagan
- Phyllis Flax as Muriel Ashton
- Gwen Willson as Frances Reed
- Marilyn Pitzer as Mora Tori
- Elizabeth Robinson as Elizabeth Yepes
- Jaqueline Coon as Alice Trey
- Abidah Viera as Carlita
- Larry Hankin as Hank Watfield

== Production ==
Filming took place during the summer of 1990. Carlos Santana's version of the song of the same name was licensed for use in the film's soundtrack and was used several times during the movie's length.

== Release ==
Black Magic Woman was released direct to video on April 17, 1991, through Trimark Pictures. According to Variety, the film had received a limited theatrical release in the months prior.

== Reception ==
Variety reviewed the film upon its release onto VHS, praising its twist ending. Kim Newman, writing for Empire, gave the film 3 out of 5 stars, stating that "while the last half-hour is effective, the film is still rather bland overall, and takes an inordinate amount of time to get going". Joe Bob Briggs rated the film 3 1/2 stars, writing that it's "the story of what would happen if Luke Skywalker got into a Fatal Attraction affair with a voodoo witch and she started hanging dead bloody roosters over his bed and really freaking out his dates."

Alexandra Heller-Nicholas reviewed the movie for Fangoria in 2022, noting "Black Magic Woman is a masterclass in a seemingly fluffy, disposable genre film, the spoonful of sugar that helps the ideological medicine go down. Because at the heart of this film lies some extraordinary twists and turns that pivot on assumptions about ethnicity, gender and sexuality".
