= Quindon Tarver =

American singer (1982–2021)

- Born: August 4, 1982; Plano, Texas, U.S.
- Died: April 1, 2021 (aged 38) Dallas, Texas, U.S.
- Genres: R&B, pop
- Occupations: Singer, songwriter, actor
- Instrument: Vocals
- Years active: 1990–2021

Quindon Dan Tarver (August 4, 1982 – April 1, 2021) was an American singer. He was best known for his covers of Prince's "When Doves Cry" and Rozalla's "Everybody's Free" for the 1996 film William Shakespeare's Romeo + Juliet.

== Life and career ==
Tarver was born in Plano, Texas on August 4, 1982. He started out singing in a church choir. In 1996, he appeared as a choir boy in the Baz Luhrmann movie Romeo + Juliet, singing at the titular couple Romeo Montague (Leonardo DiCaprio) and Juliet Capulet (Claire Danes)'s secret wedding. Tarver's covers of "Everybody's Free (To Feel Good)" and Prince's "When Doves Cry" were included on Romeo + Juliet's soundtrack, which sold two million copies, earning double-platinum status.

His album, Quindon, was released in 1996 by Virgin Records and included the single "It's You That's on My Mind", which charted in Australia and New Zealand. Under the same management as then teen sensations Immature (later known as IMx), Smooth, Gyrl, and B2K, Tarver began to appeal to a large market of teens and subsequently toured the world with the likes of Immature, Brandy, and Monica.

Tarver contributed to the soundtracks of feature films Kazaam (A&M Records) and Down in the Delta (Virgin Records). He made appearances on Good Morning America, Soul Train and American Idol (during seasons two and seven, in which he finished in the show's top fifty). He worked with artists, including Faith Evans, Playa, Tiny (of Xscape and VH1's The Family Hustle) and Nokio (of R&B group Dru Hill). He worked with record producers Johntá Austin and Troy Taylor.

In 2016, Tarver was invited to perform "When Doves Cry" as part of a Los Angeles tribute to the late musician Prince. In a later interview, Tarver stated that the performance and the audience response to it was a turning point in his life, motivating him to enter rehab and resume a singing career.

In 2017, Tarver released a new version of "Everybody's Free". He recorded the new version as a statement of innate freedom, regardless of past or present circumstances. He also started a Kickstarter campaign for an EP titled Everybody's Free (The Movement), which ended up not getting funded.

He released a single titled "Stand Our Ground" in October 2020.

== Personal life ==
In 2008, Tarver and De'Mario Thornton, a former member of B2K, spoke publicly in an interview with Vibe magazine about abuse they suffered as children at the hands of their manager and producer Chris Stokes. In 2010, Thornton covertly recorded a conversation with Tarver, where both men discussed details of their abuse, of which Tarver had disclosed details of sexual encounters with famous R&B singer Marques Houston from the '90s R&B group Immature, also known as IMx. The tape's online release prompted Tarver to make a statement that he had not consented to the conversation being made public.

In a 2017 interview, Tarver said that he had not been able to enjoy the initial success of his career due to his abuse as a child in the music industry.

In 2019, Tarver publicly came out as gay.

Tarver was killed in an auto accident in Dallas, Texas, on April 1, 2021, at the age of 38. The crash occurred on the President George Bush Turnpike.

According to the Texas Department of Public Safety, a 2003 Lexus struck the center barrier and struck another guardrail. Tarver later died at a nearby hospital.

== Discography ==
=== Albums ===
- Quindon (1996)

=== Singles ===
List of singles, with selected chart positions and certifications
Title	Year	Peak chart positions			Certifications	Album
Title	Year	US R&B	AUS	NZ	Certifications	Album
"It's You That's on My Mind"	1996	35	64	41		Quindon
"Dream About You"	1996	69	—	—		Quindon
"Everybody's Free"	1997	—	—	—		Romeo + Juliet
"When Doves Cry"	1997	—	3	34	ARIA: Gold	Romeo + Juliet
"Everybody's Free (To Wear Sunscreen)" (with Baz Luhrmann)	1998	—	65	—		Something for Everybody
"It's My Turn"	2014	—	—	—		Non-album singles
"Everybody's Free"	2017	—	—	—		Non-album singles
"Stand Our Ground"	2020	—	—	—		Non-album singles
"—" denotes a single that did not chart or was not released.
