= Romeo + Juliet (soundtrack) =

Soundtrack to the 1996 film

William Shakespeare's Romeo + Juliet: Music from the Motion Picture

Soundtrack album by various artists
- Released: October 29, 1996
- Genre: Soundtrack
- Label: Capitol

Singles from William Shakespeare's Romeo + Juliet: Music from the Motion Picture
- 1. "Lovefool" Released: September 9, 1996; 2. "Young Hearts Run Free" Released: January 1997; 3. "Kissing You (Love Theme from Romeo + Juliet)" Released: February 24, 1997; 4. "#1 Crush" Released: March 14, 1997

Professional ratings
Review scores
Source	Rating
AllMusic	3/5 stars
Entertainment Weekly	C+
Music Week	4/5 stars
Slant Magazine	4/5 stars
SoundtrackNet	3/5 stars

William Shakespeare's Romeo + Juliet: Music from the Motion Picture is the soundtrack to the 1996 film of the same name. The soundtrack contained two separate releases: the first containing popular music from the film and the second containing the score to the film composed by Nellee Hooper, Craig Armstrong and Marius de Vries.

== Volume 1 ==
The first soundtrack album to accompany the film was released on the Capitol Records label. It features songs by a number of artists including Garbage, Butthole Surfers and Radiohead (their song "Talk Show Host", a B-side that originally appeared on the "Street Spirit" single).

The soundtrack was a popular and solid seller, reaching No. 2 on the Billboard 200 albums chart and went triple-platinum in the U.S. It was especially successful in Australia, where it was the second-highest selling album in 1997, going five times Platinum in sales. A number of hit singles also resulted from the soundtrack, including "Lovefool" by The Cardigans, the love theme "Kissing You" by Des'ree, and a cover of "Young Hearts Run Free" by Kym Mazelle. Quindon Tarver's choral rendition of Rozalla's "Everybody's Free (To Feel Good)" was later used in Luhrmann's "Everybody's Free (To Wear Sunscreen)" single.

The album featured bonus tracks in the 10th Anniversary re-release in 2007.

=== Track listing ===
No.	Title	Artist	Length
1.	"#1 Crush"	Garbage	4:47
2.	"Local God"	Everclear	3:56
3.	"Angel"	Gavin Friday	4:19
4.	"Pretty Piece of Flesh"	One Inch Punch	4:53
5.	"Kissing You" (Love Theme from Romeo + Juliet)	Des'ree	4:58
6.	"Whatever (I Had a Dream)"	Butthole Surfers	4:09
7.	"Lovefool"	The Cardigans	3:19
8.	"Young Hearts Run Free"	Kym Mazelle	4:16
9.	"Everybody's Free (To Feel Good)"	Quindon Tarver	1:43
10.	"To You I Bestow"	Mundy	3:59
11.	"Talk Show Host"	Radiohead	4:37
12.	"Little Star"	Stina Nordenstam	3:40
13.	"You and Me Song"	The Wannadies	2:45

10th Anniversary re-release bonus tracks
No.	Title	Artist	Length
14.	"Introduction to Romeo" (^{a})	Craig Armstrong	2:07
15.	"Kissing You" (Instrumental ^{a})	Craig Armstrong	3:33
16.	"Young Hearts Run Free" (Ballroom Version ^{a})	Kym Mazelle featuring Harold Perrineau & Paul Sorvino	3:27
17.	"When Doves Cry" (^{a})	Quindon Tarver	4:07
18.	"Everybody's Free (To Wear Sunscreen)" ('07 Mix ^{a})	Baz Luhrmann featuring Quindon Tarver	7:10

- ^1 "Introduction to Romeo", "Kissing You (Love Theme from Romeo + Juliet) Instrumental", "When Doves Cry" and "Young Hearts Run Free (Ballroom Version)" originally appeared on the Volume 2 album.

== Volume 2 ==
William Shakespeare's Romeo + Juliet: Music from the Motion Picture, Volume 2

Soundtrack album by Nellee Hooper et al.
- Released: April 8, 1997
- Genre: Soundtrack
- Label: Capitol

The soundtrack was later followed by a sequel, William Shakespeare's Romeo + Juliet: Music from the Motion Picture, Volume 2, which featured the film's orchestral score, dialog from the film, and songs not featured on the previous album.

The score to Romeo + Juliet was composed by English music producer Nellee Hooper, Scottish composer Craig Armstrong, and English music composer and producer Marius de Vries. It was arranged, orchestrated, and conducted by Craig Armstrong using the London Session Orchestra and The Metro Voices.

The score fuses bombastic choral sequences produced by The Metro Voices as well as flamboyant orchestral pieces by the London Session Orchestra. It also contains Hooper's favorite trip hop sequences, especially seen in the track "Introduction to Romeo". Some high-beat techno tunes were fused with the chorus and orchestra in the track "Escape from Mantua".

Dialogue from the film was also inserted into several of the tracks. Justin Warfield of One Inch Punch as well the Butthole Surfers and Mundy also contribute vocals to the score. A cover of Prince's "When Doves Cry" by Quindon Tarver features on the album; it became a hit for him in Australia in 1997.

Craig Armstrong's Film Works 1995–2005 solo disc work contained several of these tracks. The score won BAFTA Award for Best Film Music for best film score in 1997. Composer Nellee Hooper was also awarded BAFTA's Anthony Asquith Award for Music for his composition of the score in 1998.

=== Track listing ===
All music is composed by Nellee Hooper, Craig Armstrong, and Marius de Vries (except where noted).

No.	Title	Writer(s)	Artist	Length
1.	"Prologue"
2.	"O Verona"
3.	"The Montague Boys"		featuring Justin Warfield of One Inch Punch
4.	"Gas Station Scene"
5.	"O Verona (Reprise)"
6.	"Introduction to Romeo"
7.	"Queen Mab Interlude"
8.	"Young Hearts Run Free (Ballroom Version)"		featuring Kym Mazelle, Harold Perrineau, & Paul Sorvino
9.	"Kissing You" (Instrumental)
10.	"Balcony Scene"
11.	"When Doves Cry"	Prince	Quindon Tarver
12.	"A Challenge"
13.	"Tybalt Arrives"		featuring Butthole Surfers & The Dust Brothers
14.	"Fight Scene"
15.	"Mercutio's Death"
16.	"Drive of Death"
17.	"Slow Movement""	Craig Armstrong
18.	"Morning Breaks"
19.	"Juliet's Requiem"
20.	"Mantua"
21.	"Escape from Mantua"		featuring Mundy
22.	"Death Scene"
23.	"Liebestod" (from Tristan und Isolde)	Richard Wagner	Leontyne Price
24.	"Epilogue"

== Chart positions ==
=== Volume 1 ===
Chart (1997)	Peak position
Australian Albums (ARIA)	1
Austrian Albums (Ö3 Austria)	2
Belgian Albums (Ultratop Flanders)	4
Belgian Albums (Ultratop Wallonia)	5
Finnish Albums (Suomen virallinen lista)	24
French Albums (SNEP)	11
German Albums (Offizielle Top 100)	8
Hungarian Albums (MAHASZ)	3
New Zealand Albums (RMNZ)	1
Dutch Albums (Album Top 100)	80
Norwegian Albums (VG-lista)	4
Swedish Albums (Sverigetopplistan)	38
Swiss Albums (Schweizer Hitparade)	7
UK Albums (Official Charts)	3

=== Year-end charts ===
Chart (1997)	Position
German Albums Chart	51

=== Volume 2 ===
Chart (1997)	Peak position
Australian Albums (ARIA)	2
Austrian Albums (Ö3 Austria)	31
Belgian Albums (Ultratop Flanders)	34
German Albums (Offizielle Top 100)	77
Hungarian Albums (MAHASZ)	7
New Zealand Albums (RMNZ)	6

== Uses in other media ==
- Evanescence sampled "Death Scene" and "O Verona" from Volume II in the 2nd and 3rd demo versions of their song "Whisper".
- The X-Files: Fight the Future used "Escape from Mantua" from Volume II in its theatrical trailer.
- British TV talent show The X Factor used "O Verona" regularly in the pre-title sequences and as the judges' entrance tune.
- Wrestler Triple H used "O Verona" as part of his entrance for Wrestlemania 30 when he went up in a losing effort against Daniel Bryan for the chance to be in the Triple Threat Match for the WWE World Heavyweight Championship against Batista and Randy Orton.
- "O Verona" is used in the trailer for Quills starring Geoffrey Rush and Kate Winslet.
- "O Verona" is sampled to accompany the film title in Michael Gracey's Robbie Williams biopic Better Man. In which the song was used to open his Knebworth Concert.

== Certifications ==
Region	Certification	Certified units/sales
Australia (ARIA)	5× Platinum	350,000^{^}
Austria (IFPI Austria)	Gold	25,000^{*}
Canada (Music Canada)	3× Platinum	300,000^{^}
France (SNEP)	2× Gold	200,000^{*}
Hong Kong (IFPI Hong Kong)	Gold	10,000^{*}
Japan (RIAJ)	Gold	100,000^{^}
New Zealand (RMNZ)	Platinum	15,000^{^}
Norway (IFPI Norway)	Gold	25,000^{*}
Poland (ZPAV)	Gold	50,000^{*}
Spain (Promusicae)	Platinum	100,000^{^}
Switzerland (IFPI Switzerland)	Gold	25,000^{^}
United Kingdom (BPI)	Platinum	300,000^{^}
United States (RIAA)	4× Platinum	3,300,000
Summaries
Europe (IFPI)	Platinum	1,000,000^{*}
Volume 2
United Kingdom (BPI)	Gold	100,000^{*}
United States (RIAA)	Gold	500,000^{^}
^{*} Sales figures based on certification alone.^{^} Shipments figures based on certification alone.
