= Apollonia 6 (album) =

Studio album by Apollonia 6
- Released: October 1, 1984
- Recorded: December 1983 – March 1984
- Studios: Sunset Sound, Hollywood
- Genres: Minneapolis sound; pop; R&B
- Length: 34:05
- Label: Warner Bros.
- Producer: Prince (as The Starr ★ Company)

Singles from Apollonia 6
- 1. "Sex Shooter" Released: August 31, 1984; 2. "Blue Limousine" Released: 1984

Professional ratings
Review scores
Source	Rating
AllMusic	3/5 stars
Christgau's Record Guide	B−
The Encyclopedia of Popular Music	2/5 stars
The Rolling Stone Album Guide	1.5/5 stars

Apollonia 6 is the only studio album by R&B vocal trio and Prince protégées Apollonia 6.

The album was initially to be the second release by the Prince-formed group Vanity 6, but when lead singer Vanity departed Prince's camp, the musician hired Apollonia Kotero and changed the group's name.

Apollonia 6 primarily features the vocals of Kotero and Brenda Bennett with backing vocals by Wendy & Lisa and Jill Jones. (Susan Moonsie only recorded one song for this album.) The album spawned one hit, "Sex Shooter", which was performed by the group in the film Purple Rain.

Although the album was released primarily on vinyl and audio cassette (Warner Bros. 25108), a CD version was released in Japan in 1990 (WPCP-3701). When Warner Bros. initially opted not to issue the album on CD, it became a highly sought-after collectible and was later pirated. It was later released in the US, but it was not made available via streaming and digital platforms.

Apollonia 6 had a fair chart run, and is considered by some to be a viable part of the Minneapolis sound.

== Track listing ==
All tracks are written by Prince, except where noted.

Side 1
No.	Title	Length
1.	"Happy Birthday, Mr. Christian"	7:06
2.	"Sex Shooter"	3:39
3.	"Blue Limousine"	6:19

Side 2
No.	Title	Writer(s)	Length
4.	"A Million Miles (I Love You)"	Prince; Lisa Coleman	5:51
5.	"Ooo She She Wa Wa"		4:10
6.	"Some Kind Of Lover"	Prince; Brenda Bennett	4:48
7.	"In A Spanish Villa"		2:12

== Personnel ==
- Apollonia Kotero – lead (1, 2, 7) and backing vocals
- Brenda Bennett – lead (3, 4, 6) and backing vocals
- Susan Moonsie – lead (5) and backing vocals
- Prince – Oberheim OB-8, Yamaha DX7, synthesizers, piano, electric guitars, bass guitar, Linn LM-1, drums, percussion
- Susannah Melvoin – backing vocals (1, 3)
- Brownmark – backing vocals (1)
- Sheila E. – drums (4), percussion (4)
- Lisa Coleman – piano (4), synthesizer (4), backing vocals (6)
- Wendy Melvoin – electric guitar (4), acoustic guitar (7)
- Jill Jones – backing vocals (4–6)

Production

- Produced by Prince (as The Starr ★ Company)
- Recorded, engineered and mixed by Peggy McCreary & The Starr ★ Company
- Mastered by Bernie Grundman
