= Team9 =

- Origin: Perth, Western Australia
- Genres: Electronic, pop
- Years active: 1997–present
- Website: http://www.team9.net/

Team9 is the name of English-Australian producer Neil Mason. Most of his work is unauthorized mashups.

Team9 formed in 1997 as a five-piece band and released two albums, Gas and Air in 1999 and My Tape Machine in 2002. Originally playing guitar-based pop, by 2002 Team9 were incorporating samples, loops and synths into their production. Having slowly evolved over three years into a one-man outfit, Team9 played in the web based bootleg scene for a number of years before getting more involved in late 2004.

Throughout 2005, Team9 featured on Live 105 and Indie 103 in the US, Qui FM and NRJ in France, BBC Radio 1 and the Remix and Rinse shows on XFM in the UK. They have also had tracks featured in magazines such as Blender, Spin, NME, Zoo and GQ.

2005 finished with Team9 collaborating on a highly popular and well-received Green Day mashup album titled American Edit under the alias Dean Gray, a collaboration with San Francisco's Party Ben. Within ten days, Warner Music sent Party Ben and Team9 a cease and desist order, whereupon the album was removed from the American Edit site. The resulting media coverage from MTV, NME, NBC and the blogosphere spawned a protest day dubbed Dean Gray Tuesday, a play on 2004's Grey Tuesday.

In 2006, Team9 collaborated with the Stereogum blog to create an album of mashups. Dubbed Mysplice 06, the album used selected high-profile tracks from the year hand-picked by Stereogum. Team9 and Stereogum have made it an annual tradition, and have so far released three more albums: Mysplice 2.0, Mysplice III and Mysplice 4. In 2007, under the name 'the Found Sound Orchestra', Team9 collaborated with comedian David Cross on a cover version of "Fitter Happier" by Radiohead. The track was featured on Stereogum's OKX tribute album. Team9 followed this up by making a Found Sound Orchestra EP available to download from their site.

In November 2007, Team9 were selected as one of the acts to feature on Triple J's Next Crop. The feature track "As We Travel" was also included on a compilation album called Beach Suite, available in Australia on the Suite Musique label. At the same time, Team9 also made a 7-track EP available on the Team9 site for free download.

From 2008 onwards, Team9 focused on creating music for television and had tracks featured on shows such as Underbelly, Offspring and Bondi Beach Rescue.
