= Brenda Bennett =

American singer (born 1962)

- Born: Brenda Mosher; January 24, 1962 (age 64); Warwick, Rhode Island, US
- Origin: Boston, Massachusetts, US
- Genres: Soul, funk, new wave, pop, rock
- Occupations: Singer, actress
- Years active: 1980–present
- Label: Warner Bros.

Brenda Bennett (born January 24, 1962) is a recording artist from Warwick, Rhode Island and is best known as a member of the American musical groups Vanity 6 and Apollonia 6. Bennett was married to Prince's lighting and set-designer/director Roy Bennett, and she had worked as Prince's "wardrobe mistress." Bennett started off as a member of a Columbia Records band called Ken Lyon and Tombstone, which toured with Mott the Hoople and Queen.

== Career ==
Vanity 6 was formed by recording artist Prince in 1982. Lead vocalist Vanity left Vanity 6 in 1983 after continuous disagreements with Prince. Group members Bennett and Susan Moonsie were joined by Vanity's replacement, vocalist Apollonia, and Prince renamed the group Apollonia 6. In both groups, Prince wanted to give Bennett the image of a bad girl—she smoked and had an attitude. Bennett and group member Susan Moonsie had small parts in the 1984 film Purple Rain, which starred Prince. Apollonia co-starred in the film.

Bennett can be heard on lead vocals on the songs "Bite the Beat" on the Vanity 6 album, and on "Some Kind of Lover", "A Million Miles (I Love You)," and "Blue Limousine" on the Apollonia 6 album. She can also be heard on the background vocals of the song "17 Days" that Prince withdrew from their album. The song became a B-side of his single "When Doves Cry".

In April 2007, YouTube displayed the Apollonia film Happy B.Day Mr. Christian. In this film, Brenda features her solo song "Blue Limousine" from the Apollonia 6 LP. She runs through cars and sings outside a gas station about her missed lover who treats her unkindly, and features Susan and Apollonia in black leather working on cars. Brenda released several music videos on YouTube in 2011. It took her a long time to recover from the death of her brother and mother before she was able to make any music again. In 2013, Bennett released "Guiltier" (written by Charlie Mason, Rob Curti, and Måns Ek) and Jemmima, "Guiltier" is a song about how it feels like to know your loved one is doing the wrong things behind your back.

Bennett appeared on Ken Reid's TV Guidance Counselor podcast on February 24, 2016.

Bennett lives in Jamestown, Rhode Island and is an inductee of the Rhode Island Music Hall of Fame.
