= Susan Moonsie =

American singer (born 1964)

- Also known as: Susan Moonsie-Mohan; Susie; Little Susie
- Born: Susan Vashtie Moonsie; January 21, 1964 (age 62); Trinidad and Tobago
- Genres: Soul; R&B; disco; funk; new wave; pop; rock
- Occupation: Singer
- Years active: 1980–1988
- Label: Warner Bros.

Susan Moonsie-Mohan (born January 21, 1964) is a Trinidadian-born American singer. She is best known as a member of the 1980s musical groups Vanity 6 and Apollonia 6 that were associated with recording artist Prince.

== Life and career ==
Susan Vashtie Moonsie was born in Trinidad and Tobago on January 21, 1964, the daughter of a conservative school teacher. She grew up in Minneapolis, where she met Prince at a local discotheque when she was sixteen in 1980. In 1981, he formed a girl group that would be called "The Hookers" with Moonsie and her sister Loreen along with Cavallo, Ruffalo & Fargnoli employee Jamie Shoop.

Then in 1982, Moonsie became a member of Vanity 6 along with set designer Roy Bennett's wife Brenda Bennett and lead singer Vanity. Moonsie was given a "teenage Lolita" image by Prince for shock value—Susan claimed she was only 16 years old at the time, although she was 18 years old when the group was formed. The group had a hit on the US R&B Chart with their single "Nasty Girl."

After lead singer Vanity's departure in 1983, Moonsie and Bennett were joined by Patricia "Apollonia" Kotero, who replaced Vanity in the group. Prince changed the group's name to Apollonia 6 and they appeared in the 1984 film Purple Rain, which co-starred Apollonia, and had a minor hit with the song "Sex Shooter" that same year. In the 1980s, Moonsie provided vocals on some of Prince's tracks.

Moonsie has lived between the United States (in Florida) and Trinidad and Tobago since 2000. Married with two children, Moonsie purchased Hardy Park Bistro in Fort Lauderdale, Florida with her son, Aaron Mohan, in 2020. She has also worked as a real estate broker.

== Relationship with Prince ==
Prince is believed to have written the song "When Doves Cry" about his relationship with Moonsie. His song "Private Joy" was also reportedly written about her.

Moonsie kept in touch with Prince through the years, up until his death in 2016.

== In pop culture ==
Moonsie is mentioned in the lyrics of the Timex Social Club hit song "Rumors". "Did you hear that one about Susan, some say she's just a tease. In a camisole, she's six feet tall. She'll knock you to your knees". This fact was confirmed by Timex Social Club founding member and lyricist Marcus A. Thompson.
