= Apollonia 6 =

1980s American female singing trio

- Left to right: Brenda Bennett, Apollonia, and Susan Moonsie (1984).

Background information
- Origin: Minneapolis, Minnesota, U.S.
- Genres: R&B; pop; Minneapolis sound; freestyle
- Years active: 1983–1985
- Label: Warner Bros.
- Past members: Apollonia Kotero; Brenda Bennett; Susan Moonsie

Apollonia 6 was an American female singing trio founded in 1983 by Prince, as a successor to his previous group Vanity 6 following the departure of lead singer Vanity. Singers Brenda Bennett and Susan Moonsie continued from the earlier group, while actress and model Apollonia Kotero joined as frontwoman. The group released one album and dissolved in 1985.

== Origin ==
Recording artist Prince created the group Vanity 6 in 1981, with singers Vanity (Denise Matthews), Brenda Bennett and Susan Moonsie. After a number of disputes with Prince, Vanity left the group in 1983 to pursue solo endeavors. She also left behind a co-starring role in Prince's 1984 film Purple Rain.

Searching for a replacement, the film's director, Albert Magnoli, met aspiring actress and model Patricia Apollonia Kotero. Prince asked her to use her middle name, and as Apollonia she both stepped into the film Purple Rain, and became lead vocalist in the group, which was renamed Apollonia 6.

The group released one self-titled album, which featured Prince associates Jill Jones and Wendy & Lisa on backing vocals.

A four-track video was filmed, based on the Apollonia 6 album, directed by Brian Thomson (Australian production designer of the original stage versions of The Rocky Horror Show and Jesus Christ Superstar), scripted by Keith Williams (concept writer for music videos by Phil Collins, Ray Parker Jr., and Donna Summer), with a cast consisting of Ricky Nelson, Edy Williams and Buck Henry. Shot in a Los Angeles film studio in 1985, and produced by British video firm Limelight, the video never went beyond rough cut. Footage from the project has appeared on many social networking sites, such as YouTube.

== Dissolution ==
After the group's demise, Kotero continued working on TV shows such as Falcon Crest and in films for the next decade. She released a solo album in 1988 titled Apollonia on Warner Bros. Records.

== Discography ==
=== Studio albums ===
- Apollonia 6 (1984)

=== Singles ===
List of singles, with selected chart positions
Title	Year	Peak chart positions					Album
Title	Year	US	US Dance	US R&B	NLD	BEL (FL)	Album
"Sex Shooter"	1984	85	32	19	16	15	Apollonia 6
"Blue Limousine"	1984	—	—	19	—	—	Apollonia 6
