= Jill Jones =

American singer and songwriter (born 1962)

- Born: July 11, 1962 (age 64); Lebanon, Ohio, US
- Genres: R&B, soul
- Occupations: Musician, actress
- Instrument: Vocals
- Years active: 1980–present
- Labels: Paisley Park/Warner Bros. Records, Peace Bisquit

Jill Jones (born July 11, 1962) is an American singer, songwriter, and actress, who performed as a backing vocalist for Teena Marie and Prince in the 1980s. She is best known for her various collaborative works with Prince in the 1980s and 1990s, including her self-titled debut album in 1987. Since 2001, she has released three acoustic and dance albums, with her most recent being 2016's I Am.

== Overview ==
Jones was born in Lebanon, Ohio on July 11, 1962. Her mother, a fashion model, is of African American heritage, and her father, a jazz drummer, is Italian. Jones was raised mostly by her grandparents, until relocating to Los Angeles when her mother remarried. She began a singing career at age 15 as a backup vocalist for Teena Marie, whom her mother managed.

== Early music career ==
Jones performed as backing vocalist on a number of Teena Marie's Motown albums in the early 80s and also co-wrote the songs "Young Girl In Love" from Lady T (1980) and "The Ballad of Cradle Rob and Me" from It Must Be Magic (1981). She met Prince in 1980 at age 18, when Teena Marie was the opening act during his Dirty Mind tour. Prince loved her voice, encouraged her to sing, and stayed in touch with Jones.

She became a backup vocalist for Prince when he invited her to the Sunset Sound recording studios in 1982, to sing backing vocals for several tracks on the album 1999. She was credited under just her initials J.J. She also was featured in music videos for the songs "1999" and "Little Red Corvette", as well as extended rarely aired music video for "Automatic", and then joined the tour for 1999 to sing backing vocals with the Prince side-project Vanity 6. After the tour, she moved to Minneapolis and became Prince's on-and-off again girlfriend. She had a bit part as a waitress in the film Purple Rain (1984), and had an appearance in the sequel Graffiti Bridge (1990), where she takes off an undergarment to end a conflicting scene with Prince.

Her debut album was the self-titled Jill Jones (1987), released on Prince's Paisley Park Records. Prince was credited as a co-writer with Jones, but wrote all of the songs himself. Lead single "Mia Bocca" became a top 10 hit in Italy in July 1987, peaking at #6. Upon its release, the album received positive reviews from critics, but was not a commercial success. As of 2007, the album has been out of print for many years.

Jones recorded numerous demo tracks in London in the late 1980s, including the tracks "Deep Kiss", "Unattainable Love", "Long Time", "Red", "White Dogs" & "Tango", among others. In 1989, she contributed a song ("The Ground You Walk On") to the soundtrack for the film Earth Girls Are Easy.

Several demos were recorded for a second album on Paisley Park, and a video was filmed for the track "Boom Boom", but an album never surfaced. In 1993, she released the dance single "Bald" on Flying Records.

Jones also did backing vocals for Apollonia 6 and recorded the Prince-written single "G-Spot", which was remixed for a 12" release by Blondie's Jimmy Destri. She also sang lead vocals on Japanese artist Ryuichi Sakamoto's single "You Do Me" from his 1990 album Beauty. In addition, Jones wrote and co-produced the song "The Great Pretender" for Lisa Lisa. She was also lead vocalist for the band Baby Mother, who recorded an album in 1995 for London Records, which remains unreleased. In 1996, she toured performing co-lead vocals as part of Chic with Nile Rodgers and Bernard Edwards before Edwards' death, and can be heard on the 1999 Chic release Live at the Budokan.

The Prince song "She's Always in My Hair", a B-side to the single "Raspberry Beret" (1985), was written about Jones.

Though Prince aided in the production of her first album, there was no input from Prince on the sessions for Jones' intended second album, which was more pop-rock oriented. From 2001 to the present, Jones has been performing acoustic rock as well as producing edgy and modern dance tracks.

She is also featured in the unreleased Vanity 6 song "Vibrator". In this song, she does a skit in a department store where Vanity goes to get batteries for her vibrator. Prince is also in the skit.

== Solo career ==
Jill provided vocals on a cover version of Carly Simon's "Why" on Ronny Jordan's album A Brighter Day in 2000 as well as contributing a cover version of Blondie's "Call Me" to a Giorgio Moroder tribute album. This was subsequently issued as a single with various remixes, including ones by Todd Terry and Mantronix.

With the help of former Paisley Park photographer and close friend David Honl, Jones released a second album entitled Two in 2001, with instrumentalist Chris Bruce. Jones performed lead vocals on the 2004 album Wasted, which was credited to The Grand Royals featuring Jill Jones. A collaboration with dance outfit Funky Junction resulted in the single "Someone to Jump Up", which has appeared on various Hedkandi compilation releases.

In 2008, Jones joined a performance in New York by Jeremy Gloff, coming up on stage to sing with Gloff's cover of her song "So Much in Love" On April 28, 2009, Jones released "Living for the Weekend" on the Peace Bisquit label. Although Wasted and Two are out of print, both albums can be found on the iTunes Store, along with "Living for the Weekend".

2014 saw the release of the single "This Is How It Feels" with Italian techno act Get Far. In August 2015, Jones made the track "Forbidden Love" available via SoundCloud. This track is from her dance album, I Am released in February 2016 via Peace Bisquit. Currently, she maintains her own fan pages on Twitter and Facebook.

In April 2024, Jill, with the help of Scottish musician Neil Billinness resurrected demos from the late 1980’s and bundled them into her fourth album “The London Sessions”.

== Discography ==
=== Albums ===
- Jill Jones (1987), Paisley Park
- Two (2001), Dav Music
- Wasted (2004), Peace Bisquit
- I Am (2016), Peace Bisquit
- The London Sessions (2024), NERO

=== Singles ===
- "Mia Bocca" b/w "77 Bleeker St." (1987), Paisley Park (No.6, Italy)
- "G-Spot" b/w "Baby Cries (Ay Yah)" (1987), Paisley Park
- "For Love" (1987), Paisley Park
- "Bald" (1993), Flying Records
- "Call Me" (2000), Cause-N-ff-ct Records
- "Station" (2001), Dav
- "Someone to Jump Up" (2008)
- "Living for the Weekend" (2009)
- "This Is How It Feels" (2014), with Get Far
- "Forbidden Love" (2015)
