= List of the Cramps members =

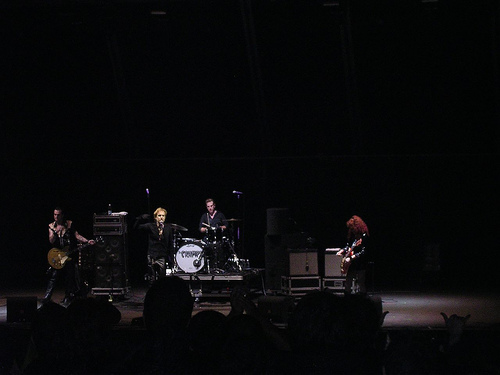
The Cramps performing in 2006.

The Cramps was an American punk rock band from New York City. Formed in April 1976, the group originally consisted of vocalist Lux Interior (Erick Purkhiser), guitarists Poison Ivy (Kristy Wallace) and Bryan Gregory (Gregory Beckerleg), and drummer Pam Balam (Pam Beckerleg). The band remained active until Purkhiser's death on February 4, 2009, when its lineup featured Wallace and drummer Harry Drumdini (Harry Meisenheimer).

== History ==
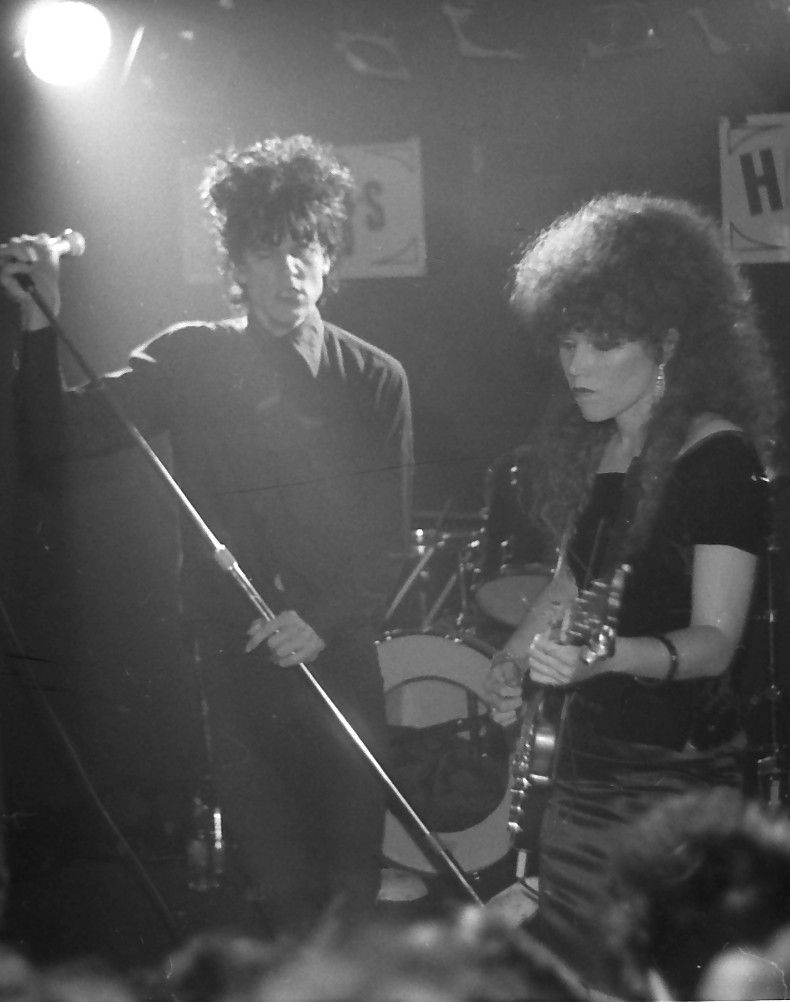
Lux Interior (left) and Poison Ivy led the Cramps throughout its 33-year tenure.

=== 1976–1986 ===
Lux Interior, Poison Ivy, Bryan Gregory and Pam Balam (Gregory's sister) formed the Cramps in April 1976. After just a few months, Balam was replaced by Miriam Linna. She remained in the group until shortly after its first headlining show in July 1977, when Nick Knox (Nick Stephanoff) took her place. After releasing three singles and a debut album, Songs the Lord Taught Us, Gregory left the Cramps at the end of May 1980 following a show in Berkeley, California. He was briefly replaced during the summer of 1980 by Julien Griensnatch (Julien Hechtlinger), before Kid Congo Powers (Brian Tristan) took over before the end of the year.

Powers contributed to 1981's Psychedelic Jungle and the 1983 live album Smell of Female, before rejoining the Gun Club that September. He was replaced for shows over the next year by Ike Knox (Mike Metoff) and Click Mort (Christopher Doran). Starting in 1985, the Cramps began adding bass to its recordings, starting with "Surfin' Dead" on the soundtrack for the film The Return of the Living Dead – initially, the role was performed by Poison Ivy, including on the band's 1986 return A Date with Elvis. For the subsequent promotional tour, Jennifer "Fur" Dixon briefly joined the band, followed by Candy del Mar starting in the summer.

=== 1986–2009 ===
With the lineup of Lux Interior, Poison Ivy, Candy del Mar and Nick Knox, the Cramps released RockinnReelininAucklandNewZealandXXX in 1987 and Stay Sick! in 1990, before both del Mar and Knox left in early 1991. In the summer, the group recorded Look Mom No Head! with new bassist Slim Chance and drummer Jim Sclavunos (formerly of Sonic Youth), although by the time the album was released, the latter had been replaced by former Weirdos and L.A. Guns drummer Nickey Alexander (Jeffrey Ivisovich). By early 1993, Alexander had also left the band, replaced by False Confession's Harry Drumdini (Harry Meisenheimer).

After two more albums – 1994's Flamejob and 1997's Big Beat from Badsville – and an extensive touring cycle, Slim Chance left the Cramps towards the end of 1998. For tour dates at the end of the year, and occasional performances during 1999 and 2000, bass was performed by Doran Shelley and later Sugarpie Jones (Tim Ferris). The group remained inactive for much of 2001 and 2002, before announcing in August 2002 that it had started recording a new album with new permanent bassist Scott "Chopper" Franklin. The album, Fiends of Dope Island, was released in April 2003. Drumdini was fired in the summer due to problems with alcohol abuse, with "Jungle" Jim Chandler stepping in for dates later in the year.

Following the release of How to Make a Monster, a compilation of old demo recordings, the Cramps toured with new drummer Bill "Buster" Bateman starting in the summer of 2004. After another hiatus, the group toured in August 2006 with Harry Drumdini returning on drums, before Franklin was replaced in October and November by Sean Yseult (Shauna Reynolds). During 2007 and 2008, the Cramps remained inactive again, before it was announced that frontman Lux Interior had died on February 4, 2009, of aortic dissection, thus signalling the end of the band.

== Members ==
Image	Stage name (real name)	Years active	Instruments	Release contributions
	Lux Interior (Erick Purkhiser)	1976–2009 (until his death)	vocals; occasional harmonica; percussion	all Cramps releases
	Poison Ivy (Kristy Wallace)	1976–2009	lead and rhythm guitars; theremin; occasional bass	all Cramps releases
	Bryan Gregory (Gregory Beckerleg)	1976–1980 (died 2001)	rhythm guitar	"Surfin' Bird" (1978); "Human Fly" (1978); Songs the Lord Taught Us (1980); "Drug Train" (1980); Live at Napa State Mental Hospital (1986); How to Make a Monster (2004)
	Pam Balam (Pam Beckerleg)	1976	drums	How to Make a Monster (2004)
	Miriam Linna	1976–1977	drums	How to Make a Monster (2004)
	Nick Knox (Nick Stephanoff)	1977–1991 (died 2018)	drums; bongos	all Cramps releases from "Surfin' Bird" (1978) to Stay Sick! (1990); How to Make a Monster (2004); At the Haçienda (2015)
	Julien Griensnatch (Julien Hechtlinger)	1980	rhythm guitar	Urgh! A Music War and its soundtrack
	Kid Congo Powers (Brian Tristan)	1980–1983	rhythm guitar	Psychedelic Jungle (1981); Smell of Female (1983); How to Make a Monster (2004)
	Ike Knox (Mike Metoff)	1983; 1984	rhythm guitar	At the Haçienda (2015)
	Click Mort (Christopher Doran)	1984 (died 2017)	rhythm guitar	none
	Touch Hazard (Tim Maag)	1985–1986	bass	none
	Jennifer "Fur" Dixon	1986	bass	A Date with Elvis (1986) – guest backing vocals on one track
	Candy Del Mar (Connie Pedesko)	1986–1991	bass	RockinnReelininAucklandNewZealandXXX (1987); Stay Sick! (1990); How to Make a Monster (2004)
	Slim Chance	1991–1998	bass	Look Mom No Head! (1991); Blues Fix (1992); Flamejob (1994); Big Beat from Badsville (1997)
	Jim Sclavunos	1991	drums	Look Mom No Head! (1991); Blues Fix (1992)
	Nickey Alexander (Jeffrey Ivisovich)	1991–1993	drums	none
	Harry Drumdini (Harry Meisenheimer)	1993–2003; 2006–2009	drums	Flamejob (1994); Big Beat from Badsville (1997); Fiends of Dope Island (2003)
	Doran Shelley	1998–1999	bass	none
	Sugarpie Jones (Tim Ferris)	1999–2000	bass	none
	Jen Hanrahan	2000	percussion	none
	Scott "Chopper" Franklin	2002–2006	bass; occasional rhythm guitar	Fiends of Dope Island (2003); Live at the Lokerse Festival, Belgium (2010)
	"Jungle" Jim Chandler	2003	drums	none
	Bill "Buster" Bateman	2004–2006	drums	Live at the Lokerse Festival, Belgium (2010)
	Sean Yseult (Shauna Reynolds)	2006	bass	none

== Lineups ==
Period	Members	Releases
March – September 1976	Lux Interior – vocals; Poison Ivy – lead guitar; Bryan Gregory – rhythm guitar; Pam Balam – drums	How to Make a Monster (2004) – 8 tracks
September 1976 – July 1977	Lux Interior – vocals; Poison Ivy – lead guitar; Bryan Gregory – rhythm guitar; Miriam Linna – drums	How to Make a Monster (2004) – 3 tracks
July 1977 – May 1980	Lux Interior – vocals; Poison Ivy – lead guitar; Bryan Gregory – rhythm guitar; Nick Knox – drums	"Surfin' Bird" (1978); "Human Fly" (1978); Songs the Lord Taught Us (1980); "Drug Train" (1980); Live at Napa State Mental Hospital (1986); How to Make a Monster (2004) – 32 tracks
Summer – late 1980	Lux Interior – vocals; Poison Ivy – lead guitar; Julien Griensnatch – rhythm guitar; Nick Knox – drums	none
November 1980 – September 1983	Lux Interior – vocals; Poison Ivy – lead guitar; Kid Congo Powers – rhythm guitar; Nick Knox – drums	Psychedelic Jungle (1981); Smell of Female (1983); How to Make a Monster (2004) – 9 tracks
October – November 1983	Lux Interior – vocals; Poison Ivy – lead guitar; Ike Knox – rhythm guitar; Nick Knox – drums	none
January - April 1984	Lux Interior – vocals; Poison Ivy – lead guitar; Click Mort – rhythm guitar; Nick Knox – drums	none
May – July 1984	Lux Interior – vocals; Poison Ivy – lead guitar; Ike Knox – rhythm guitar; Nick Knox – drums	At the Haçienda (2015)
July 1984 – March 1986	Lux Interior – vocals; Poison Ivy – guitar, bass; Nick Knox – drums	A Date with Elvis (1986)
March – May 1986	Lux Interior – vocals; Poison Ivy – guitar; Fur Dixon – bass; Nick Knox – drums	none
June 1986 – early 1991	Lux Interior – vocals; Poison Ivy – guitar; Candy del Mar – bass; Nick Knox – drums	RockinnReelininAucklandNewZealand XXX (1987); Stay Sick! (1990); How to Make a Monster (2004) – 3 tracks
Early – summer 1991	Lux Interior – vocals; Poison Ivy – guitar; Slim Chance – bass; Jim Sclavunos – drums	Look Mom No Head! (1991); Blues Fix (1992)
Summer 1991 – early 1993	Lux Interior – vocals; Poison Ivy – guitar; Slim Chance – bass; Nickey Alexander – drums	none
Early 1993 – late 1998	Lux Interior – vocals; Poison Ivy – guitar; Slim Chance – bass; Harry Drumdini – drums	Flamejob (1994); Big Beat from Badsville (1997)
1998–1999	Lux Interior – vocals; Poison Ivy – guitar; Doran Shelley – bass; Harry Drumdini – drums	none
1999–2000	Lux Interior – vocals; Poison Ivy – guitar; Sugarpie Jones – bass; Harry Drumdini – drums	none
August 2002 – July 2003	Lux Interior – vocals; Poison Ivy – guitar; Chopper Franklin – bass; Harry Drumdini – drums	Fiends of Dope Island (2003)
August – November 2003	Lux Interior – vocals; Poison Ivy – guitar; Chopper Franklin – bass; Jim Chandler – drums	none
June 2004 – July 2006	Lux Interior – vocals; Poison Ivy – guitar; Chopper Franklin – bass; Buster Bateman – drums	Live at the Lokerse Festival, Belgium (2010)
July – October 2006	Lux Interior – vocals; Poison Ivy – guitar; Chopper Franklin – bass; Harry Drumdini – drums	none
October – November 2006	Lux Interior – vocals; Poison Ivy – guitar; Sean Yseult – bass; Harry Drumdini – drums	none
November 2006 – February 2009 (band remained inactive)	Lux Interior – vocals; Poison Ivy – guitar; Harry Drumdini – drums	none
