= The Cramps discography =

Catalog of published recordings by the Cramps

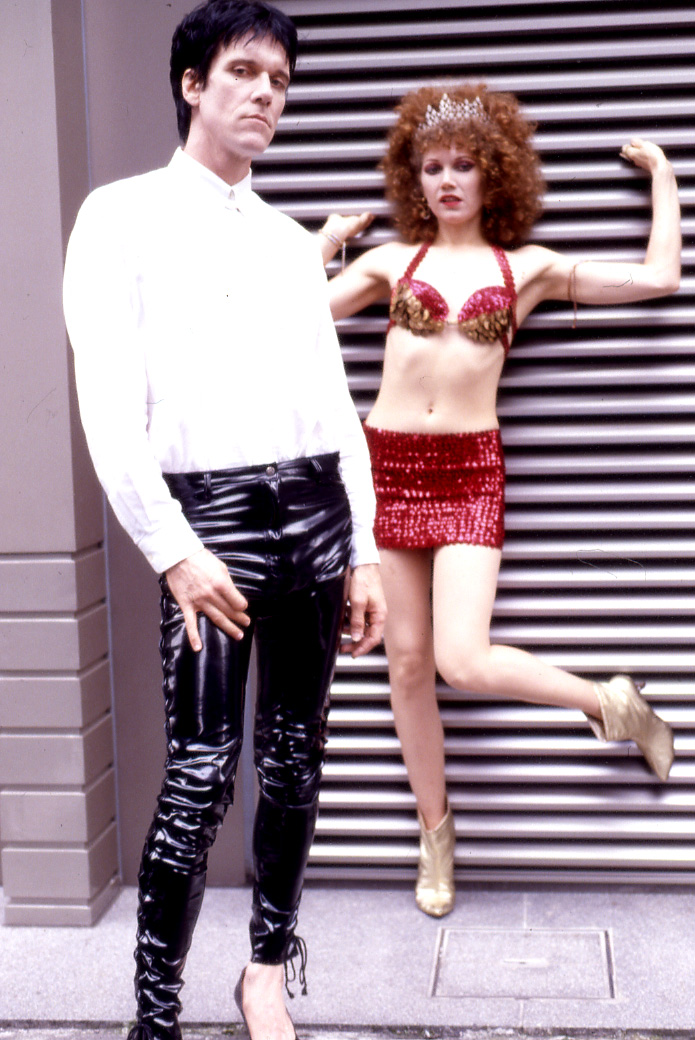
- The Cramps in Tokyo in 1990; original members Lux Interior and Poison Ivy pictured.
- Studio albums: 9
- Extended plays: 2
- Live albums: 2
- Compilation albums: 4
- Singles: 23
- Music videos: 8

American garage punk band the Cramps were active from 1976 until 2009. Its discography consists of nine studio albums, two live albums, four compilations, two EPs, and 23 singles. The band also produced eight music videos.

== Albums ==
=== Studio albums ===
Title	Album details	Peak chart positions				
Title	Album details	AUS	NZ	SWE	UK	UK Ind.
Songs the Lord Taught Us	Released: March 1980; Label: Illegal (ILP 005)	—	—	—	—	1
Psychedelic Jungle	Released: April 1981; Label: Illegal (ILP 009)	—	44	—	—	—
A Date with Elvis	Released: February 1986; Label: Big Beat (WIKA 46)	98	23	41	34	1
Stay Sick!	Released: February 1990; Label: Enigma (ENVLP 1001)	—	—	26	62	—
Look Mom No Head!	Released: 1991; Label: Big Beat (PDWIKD 101)	—	—	—	—	—
Flamejob	Released 1994; Label: The Medicine Label (24592)	—	—	—	—	—
Big Beat from Badsville	Released: 1997; Label: Epitaph (86516-2)	—	—	—	—	—
Fiends of Dope Island	Released: 2003; Label: Vengeance (675)	—	—	—	—	—
Gravest Gravy	Released: 2026; Label: Vengeance (678)	—	—	—	—	6

=== Live albums ===
Title	Album details	Peak chart positions		
Title	Album details	UK	UK Ind.	SWE
Smell of Female	Released: November 1983; Label: Big Beat (NED 6)	74	1	44
RockinnReelininAucklandNewZealandXXX	Released: September 1987; Label: Vengeance (669)	—	4	—

=== Compilation albums ===
Title	Album details	Peak chart positions	
Title	Album details	UK	UK Ind.
...Off the Bone	Released: May 1983; Label: Illegal (ILP 012)	44	1
Bad Music for Bad People	Released: 1984; Label: I.R.S. (IRS SP 70042)	—	—
Greatest Hits	Released: 1998; Label: BMG (44840-2)	—	—
How to Make a Monster	Released: 2004; Label: Vengeance (677)	—	—

== Extended plays ==
Title	EP details	Peak chart positions
Title	EP details	UK Ind.
Gravest Hits	Released: June 1979; Label: Illegal/I.R.S. (ILS 12013)	41
Blues Fix	Released: 1992; Label: Big Beat (DNST 136)	
Ultra Twist	Released: 1994; Label: Creation Records (CRESCD 180)	-

== Singles ==
Title	Year	Peak chart positions			Album
Title	Year	UK	UK Ind.	US Alt.	Album
"Surfin' Bird" / "The Way I Walk" (Vengeance 666)	1978	—	—	—	Gravest Hits
"Human Fly" / "Domino" (Vengeance 668)	1978	—	—	—	Gravest Hits
"Fever" / "Garbageman" (ILS 0017)	1980	—	12	—	Songs the Lord Taught Us
"Garbageman" / "TV Set" (CBS 8401)	1980	—	—	—	Songs the Lord Taught Us
"Garbageman" / "Drug Train" (IR 9014)	1980	—	—	—	Songs the Lord Taught Us / ...Off the Bone
"Drug Train" / "Love Me" "I Can't Hardly Stand It" (ILS 021)	1980	—	5	—	...Off the Bone
"Goo Goo Muck" / "She Said" (IR 9021)	1981	—	—	—	Psychedelic Jungle
"The Crusher" / "Save It" "New Kind of Kick" (PFSX 1008)	1981	—	—	—	Psychedelic Jungle
"Faster Pussycat" / "You Got Good Taste" (New28)	1984	—	7	—	Smell of Female
"I Ain't Nuthin' But a Gorehound" / "Weekend on Mars" (NEW33)	1984	—	2	—	Smell of Female
"Can Your Pussy Do the Dog?" / "Blue Moon Baby" (NS 110)	1985	68	1	—	A Date With Elvis
"What's Inside a Girl?" / "Give Me a Woman" (NS 115)	1986	78	2	—	A Date With Elvis
"Kizmiaz" / "Give Me a Woman" (NEW 71)	1986	—	15	—	A Date With Elvis
"Get Off the Road"	1986	—	—	—	A Date With Elvis (reissue)
"Bikini Girls with Machine Guns" / "Jackyard Backoff" (ENV 17)	1990	35	—	10	Stay Sick
"All Women Are Bad" / "Teenage Rage" (ENV 19)	1990	76	—	—	Stay Sick
"The Creature from the Black Leather Lagoon" / "Jailhouse Rock" (ENV 22)	1990	88	—	—	Stay Sick
"Eyeball in My Martini" / "Wilder Wilder Faster Faster" (NS 135)	1991	—	—	—	Look Mom, No Head!
"Lets Get Fucked Up" / "How Come You Do Me" (Medicine Label 7-18045)	1994	—	—	—	Flame Job
"Ultra Twist" / "No Club Lone Wolf" (Medicine Label 7-17976)	1994	94	—	45	Flame Job
"Naked Girl Falling Down the Stairs" / "Confessions of a Psycho Cat" (Medicine Label 7-17932)	1995	—	—	—	Flame Job
"Like a Bad Girl Should" / "I Walked All Night" (LC 256)	1997	—	—	—	Big Beat From Badsville
"Big Black Witchcraft Rock" / "Butcher Pete" (Vengeance 676)	2003	—	—	—	Fiends of Dope Island

== Music videos ==
- 1978 – "Human Fly"
- 1979 – "Garbageman"
- 1980 – "Tear It Up" (live) – from the movie Urgh! A Music War
- 1990 – "Bikini Girls with Machine Guns" (two versions: regular and explicit)
- 1990 – "Creature from the Black Leather Lagoon"
- 1994 – "Ultra Twist" (two versions: regular and X-rated)
- 1994 – "Naked Girl Falling Down the Stairs"
- 1997 – "Like a Bad Girl Should"
- 2026 – "TV Set" ("Gravest Gravy" Version)

== Bootleg albums ==
This is an incomplete list of bootlegs, which can or may never satisfy any subjective standard for completeness. Revisions and additions are welcome.

Album	Notes
After Dark	live at Hammersmith Odeon, London on 14 March 1986
Rock & Roll Monster Bash	Live at 'The Edge' Toronto, Canada - July 18th 1980
All Tore Up	demos recorded in Akron, Ohio in 1979
Beyond the Valley of the Cramps	live at the Ritz, NYC in 1983 and the Lyceum, London in 1980
Booze Party	live at the Ritz, NYC in 1989
Bikini Girls with Machine Guns Are Searching the Creature from the Black Lagoon	live at Docks, Hamburg, Germany on 13 March 1990
Black Leather	live in San Francisco, CA on 13 March 1980
CBGB's	live at CBGB, NYC on 10 June 1977
Creatures from the Black Leather Lagoon	Recorded in Offenbach am Main, Germany, in 1990
A Date with the Cramps	live at the Free Wheels Festival, Cunlhat, France on 19 August 1995
Demon Seeds & Dastardly Deeds	live at Toad's Place, New Haven, CT on 20 February 1992
Demons of the Swamp Vol. 1	
Demons of the Swamp Vol. 2	live at Max's Kansas City, NYC in 1978
Don't Pummel & You Won't Pogo. They Ooze & You'll Throb	live in Hamburg, Germany in 1986
Electric Cheese	Tracks 1 -8 – live at Brixton Academy, London on 25 February 1990 Tracks 3–5 – live on MTV Europe on 2 February 1995; Track 6 – live in Montreal, QC on 6 May 16, 1984
Exorcism Night	live at Club 57, NYC on 18 August 1979
Faster Pussycat	live at the Hammersmith Palais, London on 28 May 1984
Fetischism Vol 2	live in France in 1980
Frank Further and the Hot Dogs	live at CBGB, NYC on 13 January 1978
Haunt of the Cramps	Tracks 1–8 – radio broadcasts from KFAT, Palo Alto, CA in February 1979 Tracks 9–13 – studio outtakes from 1979
Hot Club	live at the Hot Club, Philadelphia in 1977
Human Fly	live at the Gigant, Apeldoorn, Netherlands on 12 June 1981
Kizmiaz	live in Frankfurt, Germany, on 17 April 1986
Last Time for Nick in Paris	live at Elysee Montmartre, Paris, France, on 6 March 1990
Live at Harry's	live at Harry's Hideaway, Toronto, Ontario, on 14 June 1982
Live Venus	live at The Venue, London, on 19 April 1980
Most Exaltet Potentates of Trash	mini-LP
N*zibilly Werewolfen, N'ont Pas De Bausparvertrag	live in Palo Alto, California, in 1979
No More Cramped for Space	live in New Orleans, Louisiana, on 4 December 1979
OFF AIR	Semi-official four-disc compilation with demos recorded through entire career of the band (including NYC home demos' 1976; Richard Robinson's demos; Memphis demos' 1977; Chris Spedding' demos' 1978; Akron, Ohio' 1979; Hollywood demos' 1981/1982; Smell of Female rehearsals, 1983; Janice Long' session, 1986; Cahuenga Blvd Shack' 1988; suite For Cry Baby movie, 1989; and many other rarities).
Persecuted Prophets With B Movie Soul	Track 1–4 – Smell of Female rehearsals Track 5–8 – demos recorded with Terry Graham on drums
Psychedelic Safari	live in Seattle, Washington, on 20 May 1982
Rock'N'Roll Monster Bash	Recorded at The Edge, Toronto, Ontario, on 18 July 1980
The Secret Life of the Cramps	B-sides collection
Sex & Cramps & Rock'N'Roll!	live at Markthalle Hamburg, Germany, on 18 April 1986
Songs the Cramps Taught Us 2!	live in Offenbach am Main, Germany in 1990
These Pussies Can Do the Dog	live in Amsterdam, Netherlands, on 3 April 1986
Totally Destroy Seattle!!	live in Seattle, Washington, on 20 May 1982
Transylvanian Tapes	Side A produced by Chris Spedding in December 1978; Side B live at Max's Kansas City, NYC in 1978
Voodoo Idols	live in Indianapolis, Indiana, in 1981
Voodoo Rhythm	Tracks 1–4 – studio outtakes Tracks 5–8 – soundchecks Tracks 9–12 – live at CBGB, NYC in 1982
Wild Psychotic Teen Sounds	demos recorded in Akron, Ohio in 1979
