= ...Off the Bone =

Compilation album by The Cramps
- Released: 1983
- Recorded: 1977–1979
- Genres: Gothabilly; gothic rock; rockabilly
- Length: 45:20
- Label: Illegal
- Producers: Alex Chilton, the Cramps

The Cramps chronology
Smell of Female (1983)	...Off the Bone (1983)	Bad Music for Bad People (1984)

...Off the Bone is the first compilation album of previously released material by the American rock band the Cramps. It was released in 1983 in the United Kingdom on Illegal Records. The original release had an anaglyph on the cover and a pair of paper red and blue "3D glasses" inside the sleeve for viewing it.

== Reception ==
Professional ratings
Review scores
Source	Rating
AllMusic	4/5 stars

The British weekly Sounds gave the album a 5-star review, calling it "...a hell-fire cocktail of gutter riffing and chattering Rockabilly voodoo strum into which is dropped an electric sugar cube of psychedelic power".

== Track listing ==
All tracks are written by Lux Interior and Poison Ivy Rorschach, except where noted.

Side One
No.	Title	Writer(s)	Original release	Length
1.	"Human Fly"		Human Fly 7"
2.	"The Way I Walk"	Jack Scott	Surfin' Bird 7"
3.	"Domino"	Sam Phillips	Human Fly 7"
4.	"Surfin' Bird"	Steve Wahrer	Surfin' Bird 7"
5.	"Lonesome Town"	Baker Knight	Gravest Hits
6.	"Garbage Man"		Fever 7"
7.	"Fever"	John Davenport, Eddie Cooley	Fever 7"

Side Two
No.	Title	Writer(s)	Original release	Length
1.	"Drug Train"		Drug Train 7"
2.	"Love Me"	Marty Lott	Drug Train 7"
3.	"I Can't Hardly Stand It"	Charlie Feathers, Jerry Huffman, Jody Chastain	Drug Train 7"
4.	"Goo Goo Muck (Single Mix)"	Ronnie Cook	Goo Goo Muck 7"
5.	"She Said"	Hasil Adkins	Goo Goo Muck 7"
6.	"The Crusher"	Bobby Nolan	The Crusher 7"
7.	"Save It"	Hargus Robbins, Mary Biggs	The Crusher 7"
8.	"New Kind of Kick"		The Crusher 7"

== Personnel ==
- Lux Interior – vocals
- Bryan Gregory – guitar
- Kid Congo Powers – guitar
- Poison Ivy Rorschach – guitar
- Nick Knox – drums

== Charts ==
Weekly chart performance for ...Off the Bone
Chart (1983–2022)	Peak position
UK Albums (Official Charts)	44
UK Album Downloads (Official Charts)	95

Chart (2025)	Peak position
Greek Albums (IFPI)	92
