= Bad Music for Bad People =

- Album art by Stephen Blickenstaff (artist)

Compilation album by the Cramps
- Released: 1984
- Recorded: 1977–1979
- Genre: Punk rock
- Length: 31:17
- Label: I.R.S.
- Producer: Poison Ivy

The Cramps chronology
...Off the Bone (1983)	Bad Music for Bad People (1984)	A Date with Elvis (1986)

Professional ratings
Review scores
Source	Rating
AllMusic	4/5 stars
Tom Hull – on the Web	B+

Bad Music for Bad People is the second compilation album of previously released material by the American rock band the Cramps. It was released in 1984 on I.R.S. Records and was seen by most fans as a cynical cash-in by the record label, following the departure of the band. Sounds, the now defunct UK music paper, gave the album a five-star review but said, "Miles Copeland's IRS label pick the carrion of their former label mates even cleaner by releasing a watered down version of the ...Off the Bone singles collection that was released in the UK... The music's still great even if the scheming behind Bad Music for Bad People stinks of decay and corruption".

== Cover art ==
The cover art is a caricature of Lux Interior by Frederick, Maryland-based artist Stephen Blickenstaff who created it on Halloween night 1983. He attended The Cramps concerts in Baltimore and Washington, D.C. and was able to meet and befriend band members with his artwork at the 9:30 Club. I.R.S. Records eventually asked for and was granted permission to use those drawings by Blickenstaff who at the time had no expectations that it would be used as album art.

The Lux Interior caricature appeared on a black t-shirt worn by Lorde when she was on the cover of the 30 January 2014 issue of Rolling Stone. It was altered with the face of William Shatner on the front cover of a 12-inch (30.48-centimeter) neon yellow vinyl that featured both the original version and the actor's remake of "Garbageman" which was part of Record Store Day's Black Friday special releases in 2019.

== Track listing ==
All tracks are written by Lux Interior and Poison Ivy Rorschach; except where indicated.

No.	Title	Writer(s)	Length
1.	"Garbageman"		3:33
2.	"New Kind of Kick"		3:27
3.	"Love Me"	Marty Lott	1:59
4.	"I Can't Hardly Stand It"	Jody Chastain, Charlie Feathers, Jerry Huffman	2:40
5.	"She Said"	Hasil Adkins	3:13
6.	"Goo Goo Muck (Single Mix)"	Ronnie Cook	3:01
7.	"Save It"	Mary Biggs, Hargus Robbins	2:55
8.	"Human Fly"		2:13
9.	"Drug Train"		2:35
10.	"TV Set"		3:12
11.	"Uranium Rock"	Warren Smith	2:26

== Personnel ==
- Lux Interior - vocals
- Bryan Gregory - guitar
- Kid Congo Powers - guitar
- Poison Ivy Rorschach - guitar
- Nick Knox - drums
