= How to Make a Monster (album) =

Compilation album by the Cramps
- Released: 2004
- Length: 142:59
- Label: Vengeance

The Cramps chronology
Fiends of Dope Island (2003)	How to Make a Monster (2004)	The Secret Life of the Cramps (2006)

Professional ratings
Review scores
Source	Rating
AllMusic	4/5 stars

How To Make A Monster is the third compilation album by the American rock band the Cramps. Comprising rare, previously unreleased tracks, the release is a 2-CD set that includes a 28-page book with extensive liner notes by members Lux Interior and Poison Ivy, as well as rare and previously unseen photos and flyers from their personal collection.

== Content included ==
Disc 1 contains 1976 rehearsal material, some 1982 studio demos with Terry Graham of the Gun Club on drums, and several other previously unreleased studio recordings. Disc 2 contains two historic live performances of relatively poor recording quality, both from very early in the band's career (one at Max's Kansas City and the other at CBGB).

== Track listing ==
All songs by Lux Interior and Poison Ivy Rorschach, except where otherwise noted

=== Disc 1 ===
Summer 1976

1. "Quick Joey Small" (Joey Levine, Arthur Resnick) — 2:08
2. "Lux's Blues" — 1:14
3. "Love Me" (Marty Lott) — 2:56
4. "TV Set" — 3:12
5. "Love Me" (Marty Lott) — 2:29
6. "Domino" (Sam Phillips) — 2:34
7. "Sunglasses After Dark" (Dwight Pullen) — 1:16
8. "Subwire Desire" (Sam Phillips) — 2:50

October 1976

9. "I Was a Teenage Werewolf" — 3:08
10. "Can't Hardly Stand It" (Jody Chastain, Charlie Feathers, Jerry Huffman) — 3:21

1981 Rehearsal

11. "Sweet Woman Blues" (Edwin Bruce) — 4:54
12. "Rumble Blues" (Milt Grant, Link Wray) — 1:49
13. "Rumble Blues" (False Start) (Milt Grant, Link Wray) — 0:49
14. "Rumble Blues" (Milt Grant, Link Wray) — 3:28
15. "Rumble Blues" (Milt Grant, Link Wray) — 2:32
16. "Lonesome Town" (Baker Knight) — 4:13

1982 A&M Studio

17. "Five Years Ahead of My Time" (Rusty Evans, Vicky Pike) — 2:10
18. "Call of the Wighat" — 4:35
19. "Hanky Panky" (Jeff Barry, Ellie Greenwich) — 2:55

1988 Rehearsal

20. "Journey to the Center of a Girl" — 3:35
21. "Jackyard Backoff" — 3:04
22. "Everything Goes" — 1:53

1988 Home Demo

23. "All Women are Bad" — 3:47

=== Disc 2 ===
Live at Max's Kansas City, 1/14/77

1. "Don't Eat Stuff Off the Sidewalk" — 2:06
2. "I Was a Teenage Werewolf" — 3:10
3. "Sunglasses After Dark" — 5:03
4. "Jungle Hop" — 2:20
5. "Domino" — 3:18
6. "Love Me" — 3:21
7. "Strychnine" (Gerry Roslie) — 4:19
8. "TV Set" — 3:25
9. "I'm Cramped" — 2:33

Live at CBGB, 1/13/78

10. "The Way I Walk" — 3:27
11. "Love Me" — 3:01
12. "Domino" — 3:39
13. "Human Fly" — 3:04
14. "I Was a Teenage Werewolf" — 3:25
15. "Sunglasses After Dark" — 4:43
16. "Can't Hardly Stand It" — 3:34
17. "Uranium Rock" — 3:02
18. "What's Behind the Mask" — 3:00
19. "Baby Blue Rock" — 3:01
20. "Subwire Desire" — 2:53
21. "I'm Cramped" — 2:51
22. "TV Set" — 3:38

== Personnel ==
- Lux Interior - vocals; guitar on "Lux's Blues"
- Poison Ivy, Bryan Gregory (tracks 1-1 to 1-10, 2-1 to 2-22), Kid Congo Powers (tracks 1-11 to 1-19) - guitar
- Candy Del Mar - bass (tracks 1-20 to 1-22)
- Miriam Linna (tracks 1-9, 1-10, 2-1 to 2-9), Nick Knox (tracks 1-11 to 1-16, 1-20 to 1-22, 2-10 to 2-22), Pam Balam (tracks 1-1 to 1-8), Terry Graham (tracks 1-17 to 1-19) - drums

Technical

- Earle Mankey - assembly and mastering
