= A Date with Elvis (The Cramps album) =

Studio album by the Cramps
- Released: 1986
- Recorded: Early 1985
- Studio: Ocean Way, Hollywood, California
- Genre: Rockabilly; garage rock; punk rock; surf
- Length: 43:51
- Label: Big Beat
- Producer: The Cramps

The Cramps chronology
Bad Music for Bad People (1984)	A Date with Elvis (1986)	RockinnReelininAucklandNewZealandXXX (1987)

Singles from A Date with Elvis
- 1. "Can Your Pussy Do the Dog?" Released: October 1985 (UK only); 2. "What's Inside a Girl?" Released: April 1986 (UK only)

Professional ratings
Review scores
Source	Rating
AllMusic	3.5/5 stars
The New Rolling Stone Album Guide	3/5 stars

A Date with Elvis is the third full-length studio album by the American rock band the Cramps, released in the UK on Big Beat Records in 1986. The title was appropriated from A Date with Elvis (1959), the eighth album by Elvis Presley. The album was recorded in fall 1985 and engineered by Steve McMillan and Mark Ettel at Ocean Way Studios in Hollywood, California. The album was first released in the US in 1990 by Enigma Records, with the bonus tracks "Blue Moon Baby", "Georgia Lee Brown", "Give Me a Woman", and "Get Off the Road". The Cramps reissued the album (with bonus tracks) on their own Vengeance Records in 2001. The original album was reissued in the UK by Big Beat in 2013 on orange vinyl, and subsequently reissued again by Vengeance Records in the US, UK and Canada in 2014. It was the Cramps' most commercially successful album release, charting internationally and reaching the top 40 of the UK Albums Chart.

The album was dedicated to Ricky Nelson, whose version of the song "Lonesome Town" (covered by the Cramps on their first EP Gravest Hits and later included on compilation album ...Off the Bone) was a US hit single in 1958. It is also significant in that it is the only Cramps album to feature vocals by guitarist Poison Ivy, on "Kizmiaz" (as well as on the B-side "Get Off the Road" included on the 1990 reissue).

== Critical reception ==
Robert Palmer, in The New York Times, praised the album and called it the band's best. He wrote: "After a decade together, the Cramps have learned to focus and intensify their inventive revisions of rock-and-roll tradition and their playfully anarchic spirit." The A to X of Alternative Music called it the band's "most effective distillation of psychedelia, punk and rock'n'roll." Spin said, "The new Cramps have less edge. They've betrayed their retropurism by recording in stereo and adding bass lines to some of the tracks. The departure of hallucinatory axman Brian Gregory leaves the Cramps somewhat less nasty, but they have gotten better at what they do best—humorously exploiting their obsession with Trash."

== Track listing ==
All tracks are written by Lux Interior and Poison Ivy Rorschach, except where noted.

A Date with Elvis track listing
No.	Title	Writer(s)	Length
1.	"How Far Can Too Far Go?"		4:10
2.	"The Hot Pearl Snatch"		3:17
3.	"People Ain't No Good"		3:46
4.	"What's Inside a Girl?"		3:22
5.	"Can Your Pussy Do the Dog?"		3:22
6.	"Kizmiaz"		3:01
7.	"Cornfed Dames"		5:26
8.	"Chicken"	Traditional; arranged by Interior and Rorschach	1:40
9.	"(Hot Pool Of) Womanneed"		3:09
10.	"Aloha from Hell"		2:35
11.	"It's Just That Song"	Charlie Feathers, Ramon Maupin	2:35

Reissue bonus tracks
No.	Title	Writer(s)	Length
12.	"Blue Moon Baby"	Meridan, Rowe, Satalsk	2:38
13.	"Georgia Lee Brown"	Hafner, Zinn	3:24
14.	"Give Me a Woman"	Willie Jacobs	2:25
15.	"Get Off the Road"	H.G. Lewis	3:12

== Personnel ==
=== The Cramps ===
- Lux Interior – vocals
- Poison Ivy Rorschach – guitars, bass guitar, vocals on "Kizmiaz" and "Get Off the Road"
- Nick Knox – drums, bongos

with:

- McMartin Preschool Choir (includes Fur Dixon) – vocals on "People Ain't No Good"

=== Technical ===
- Mark Ettel, Steve Macmillan – engineer
- Joe Schiff, Tony Chiappa – assistant engineers
- Eddy Schreyer – mastering
- The Cramps – cover layout, photography
- Phil Smee – cover illustration (lettering)

== Charts ==
Chart performance for A Date with Elvis
Chart (1986)	Peak position
Australian Albums (Kent Music Report)	98
New Zealand Albums (RMNZ)	23
Swedish Albums (Sverigetopplistan)	41
UK Albums (OCC)	34
