= Donna Santisi =

American photographer

- Born: New Jersey
- Known for: Photography
- Website: donnasantisiphotography.com

Donna Santisi is an American photographer. Her work has appeared in Slash, New York Rocker and Creem.

== Career ==
Santisi first became interested in photography in college. She saw Janis Joplin multiple times and the desire grew to document the experience. Santisi received a BS in Business Administration from Rider University but after experiencing the punk scene of Los Angeles Santisi devoted herself to photography.

The first bands Santisi photographed were The Shangri-Las and The Young Rascals.

Her seminal punk photography collection documenting the LA new wave and punk rock scene, Ask The Angels, was published in 1978. An expanded edition was published in 2010.

Santisi shot the cover for The Cramps's album Psychedelic Jungle, provided photography for the inner sleeves of The Name of This Band Is Talking Heads by Talking Heads and Learning to Crawl by The Pretenders, among other album covers and sleeve inserts. Her photography was used for the cover of Kelly Johnson's biography Surviving My Friends: The Official Kelly Johnson Story.

Santisi is predominately a nature photographer now.
