= Psychedelic Jungle =

Studio album by The Cramps
- Released: March 27, 1981
- Recorded: January 1981
- Studios: A&M, Hollywood, California
- Genre: Punk rock
- Length: 40:22
- Labels: I.R.S. (original US/UK release); Illegal (original Australian/New Zealand release); Zonophone (1998 European CD reissue); ViNiLiSSSiMO (2011 Spanish vinyl reissue)
- Producer: The Cramps

The Cramps chronology
Songs the Lord Taught Us (1980)	Psychedelic Jungle (1981)	Smell of Female (1983)

Singles from Psychedelic Jungle
- 1. "Goo Goo Muck" Released: 1981; 2. "The Crusher" Released: 1981

Professional ratings
Review scores
Source	Rating
AllMusic	4/5 stars
The Rolling Stone Album Guide	2.5/5 stars
Smash Hits	8/10
Sounds	5/5 stars
Spin Alternative Record Guide	7/10
The Village Voice	B

Psychedelic Jungle is the second album by the American rock band The Cramps. It was released on March 27, 1981 on I.R.S. Records. It was engineered by Paul McKenna and recorded in January 1981 at A&M Studios. It was self-produced by the Cramps. The photo on the back cover of the album was taken by the noted photographer and director Anton Corbijn.

Only half of the album's 14 tracks are original compositions, written by guitarist Poison Ivy Rorschach and singer Lux Interior. The rest are cover versions of rock and roll, rockabilly, and garage rock singles from the 1950s and 1960s; these include "Green Door" by Jim Lowe (1956), "Jungle Hop" by Kip Tyler and the Flips (1958), "Rockin' Bones" by Ronnie Dawson (1959), "Goo Goo Muck" by Ronnie Cook and the Gaylads (1962), "The Crusher" by the Novas (1964), "Primitive" by the Groupies (1966), and "Green Fuz" by Green Fuz (1969).

== Track listing ==
Writing credits adapted from the album's liner notes.

Side one
No.	Title	Writer(s)	Length
1.	"Green Fuz" (originally performed by Green Fuz)	Les Dale, Randy Alvey	2:09
2.	"Goo Goo Muck" (originally performed by Ronnie Cook and the Gaylads)	Ronnie Cook, Ed James	3:06
3.	"Rockin' Bones" (originally performed by Ronnie Dawson)	Jack Rhodes, Don Carter, Dub Nalls	2:48
4.	"Voodoo Idol"	Poison Ivy Rorschach, Lux Interior	3:39
5.	"Primitive" (originally performed by the Groupies)	Ronnie Peters, Peter Hindlemen, Norman DesRosier, Gordon McLaren, Bobby Cortez, Steve Venet	3:32
6.	"Caveman"	Rorschach, Interior	3:51
7.	"The Crusher" (originally performed by the Novas)	Bobby Nolan	1:47

Side two
No.	Title	Writer(s)	Length
1.	"Don't Eat Stuff Off the Sidewalk"	Rorschach, Interior	2:04
2.	"Can't Find My Mind"	Rorschach, Interior	3:01
3.	"Jungle Hop" (originally performed by Kip Tyler and the Flips)	Kip Tyler	2:07
4.	"The Natives Are Restless"	Rorschach, Interior	3:00
5.	"Under the Wires"	Rorschach, Interior	2:44
6.	"Beautiful Gardens"	Rorschach, Interior	3:59
7.	"Green Door" (originally performed by Jim Lowe)	Hutch Davie, Marvin Moore	2:35

== Personnel ==
=== The Cramps ===
- Lux Interior – vocals
- Poison Ivy Rorschach – guitar
- Kid Congo Powers – guitar
- Nick Knox – drums

=== Technical ===
- Paul McKenna – engineer
- Donna Santisi – front cover photography
- Anton Corbijn – back cover photography

== In popular culture ==
The song "Goo Goo Muck" plays during the original dance scene in the television series Wednesday, which led to a resurgence of the song. According to Billboard, on-demand streams of the song in the United States increased from 2,500 to over 134,000, and Spotify streams increased by 9,500 percent since the series was released. Janelle Zara of The Guardian stated that the viral dance trend "may have single-handedly revived Gothic subculture for Gen Z."

The song was first used in the 1986 motion picture The Texas Chainsaw Massacre Part 2.
