= How to Make a Monster =

How to Make a Monster may refer to:

- How to Make a Monster (1958 film), a horror/science fiction film made by American International Pictures
- How to Make a Monster (2001 film), a TV movie of the same name
- How to Make a Monster (album) (2004), by psychobilly band The Cramps
- "How to Make a Monster", a track from the Rob Zombie album Hellbilly Deluxe
