= Kip Tyler =

American musician

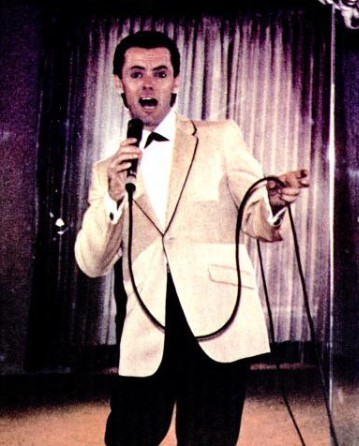
- Tyler in 1964

Background information
- Also known as: Jimmy Daley
- Born: Elwood Westerton Smith; May 31, 1929; Chicago, Illinois, U.S.
- Died: September 23, 1996 (aged 67) Los Angeles, California, U.S.
- Genres: Rockabilly, rock and roll
- Occupations: Singer, musician, bandleader
- Instruments: Vocals, bongos
- Years active: 1957–1965
- Labels: Challenge, Ebb Records, Decca, Imperial, Starla, Gyro Disc

Kip Tyler (May 31, 1929 – September 23, 1996) was an American rock and roll singer and bongo player. He led Kip Tyler and the Flips, a Los Angeles-based group in the late 1950s whose rotating lineup included several musicians who later achieved prominence as session players.

In 1957, he joined Kip Tyler and the Flips, one of L.A.'s most important rock 'n' roll bands, a group that has included Steve Douglas, Sandy Nelson, Bruce Johnston and Jim Horn, though not all at the same time. Nelson had joined his first group, Kip Tyler and the Flips, before his solo success.

== Early career ==
Born in Chicago on May 31, 1929, Elwood Westerton Smith (sometimes rendered as Elwood Westertson Smith) became lead singer of a high school group called The Sleepwalkers. Bruce Johnston's first band was the Sleepwalkers, which did not record professionally. In 1958 Nelson and Johnston joined Kip Tyler and the Flips.

The group that became the Flips formed from musicians from Union High School and Fairfax High School in Los Angeles. Contemporary discographies list the lineup as Jim Horn, Larry Knechtel, Mike Bermani, Mike Deasy, Sandy Nelson and Steve Kreisman.

== Career ==
=== Jimmy Daley recordings: 1957 ===
In 1957 Tyler was hired to record under the name Jimmy Daley in connection with the Universal Pictures film Rock, Pretty Baby (1956) and its promotional campaign. He recorded for Decca Records as Jimmy Daley and the Ding-A-Lings. The project ended after the sequel Summer Love (1958) underperformed.

=== Kip Tyler and the Flips: 1957–1959 ===
Tyler formed Kip Tyler and the Flips in 1957. The group were added to Earl McDaniel's Rock and Roll show at the United Artists Theatre in Los Angeles in September 1957. Their debut single "Let's Monkey Around" b/w "Vagabond Mama" on Starla received a rockabilly treatment that drew excellent reaction out of Philly.

The band signed to Challenge Records. Challenge released "Jungle Hop" b/w "Ooh Yeah Baby" as catalogue number 59008 in April 1958. Following the Challenge sessions, Bermani, Knechtel and Steve Douglas left to join Duane Eddy's backing band The Rebels. The reconstituted lineup recorded for Leona Rupe's Ebb Records, including "She's My Witch" b/w "Rumble Rock" (1958) and "Oh Linda" b/w "Hali-Lou" (1959).

=== Later recordings: 1960–1965 ===
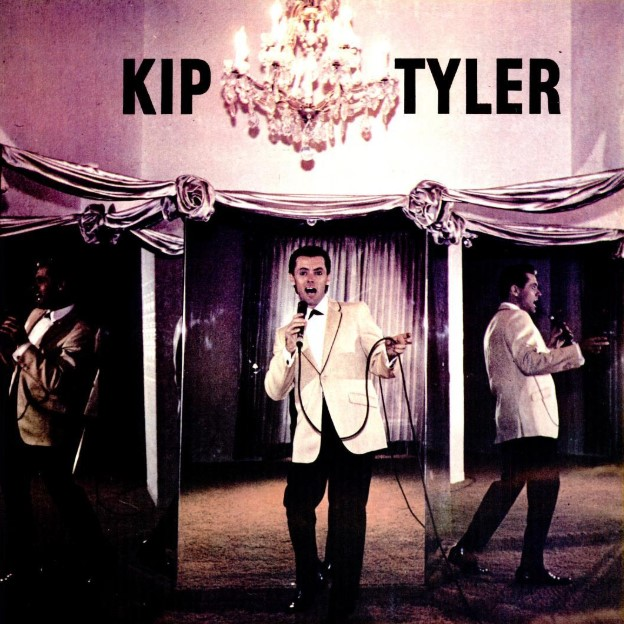
Kip Tyler promotional image from 1964

After the Flips disbanded, Tyler recorded for Imperial Records in 1960, with two sides issued. Between 1957 and 1964, Tyler released seven singles, all on obscure and independent record labels like Ebb, Challenge, and Gyro Disc. He later recorded for Gyro Disc in Hollywood from 1964 to 1965, including "On the Flipside" and "The King of Love" b/w "Snowlight".

== Death ==
Tyler died in Los Angeles on September 23, 1996, from natural causes, aged 67.

== Legacy ==
Tyler did not achieve mainstream chart success in his lifetime, although in retrospect his recordings have been anthologized as early horror-themed rock and roll. Bear Family's catalogue lists KIP TYLER : She's My Witch among 20 tracks of rare 50s and 60s blood curdling Rock and Roll. Ace Records describes She's My Witch as an L.A. hipster masterpiece with a mean and evil descending guitar line.

"Jungle Hop" found some success decades later, in 1981, when it was given a psychobilly makeover by punk heroes The Cramps for their record Psychedelic Jungle. L.A. rockers Kip Tyler and the Flips' rockerbride-anthem "She's My Witch" was later given an eerie remake by Tav Falco's Panther Burns. Compilation Ooh Yeah Baby...!! (Hydra Records) collects his Challenge Records, Ebb, Imperial Records and Gyro Disc sides.
