= Stay Sick! =

Studio album by the Cramps
- Released: February 12, 1990
- Recorded: 1989
- Studio: Music Grinder Studios, Hollywood, California
- Genre: Psychobilly; rockabilly
- Length: 47:51
- Label: Enigma
- Producer: Poison Ivy

The Cramps chronology
Rockin n Reelin in Auckland New Zealand (1987)	Stay Sick! (1990)	Look Mom No Head! (1991)

Singles from Stay Sick!
- 1. "Bikini Girls with Machine Guns / Jackyard Backoff" Released: 1990; 2. "All Women Are Bad / Teenage Rage" Released: 1990; 3. "The Creature from the Black Leather Lagoon / Jailhouse Rock" Released: 1990

Professional ratings
Review scores
Source	Rating
AllMusic	3.5/5 stars
Rolling Stone	4/5 stars

Stay Sick! is the fourth studio album (and ninth overall) by the American rock band the Cramps. It was released on February 12, 1990, by Enigma Records, recorded at Music Grinder in Hollywood, self-produced by guitarist Poison Ivy and engineered by Steve McMillan. It was the last made in studio with long-time drummer Nick Knox.

"Bikini Girls with Machine Guns" was the band's only UK Top 40 single, reaching No. 35 in 1990.

The album name pays homage to a saying from Ghoulardi.

The Cramps reissued the album on their own Vengeance Records in 2001. This edition contained four bonus tracks: "Bikini Girls with Machine Guns (Live)", "Beat Out My Love," "Jailhouse Rock" and "Jackyard Backoff". It also featured a slightly different cover.

== Track listing ==
All tracks are written by Lux Interior and Ivy Rorschach; except where indicated.

Side one
No.	Title	Writer(s)	Length
1.	"Bop Pills"	Macy Skipper; Arthur Melton McNatt	2:24
2.	"God Damn Rock & Roll"		2:38
3.	"Bikini Girls with Machine Guns"		3:17
4.	"All Women Are Bad"		3:09
5.	"The Creature from the Black Leather Lagoon"		3:06
6.	"Shortnin' Bread"	Traditional; arranged by Ivy Rorschach	2:50

Side two
No.	Title	Writer(s)	Length
1.	"Daisys Up Your Butterfly"		2:38
2.	"Everything Goes"		3:46
3.	"Journey to the Center of a Girl"		4:49
4.	"Mama Oo Pow Pow"		2:33
5.	"Saddle Up a Buzz Buzz"		2:43
6.	"Muleskinner Blues"	Jimmie Rodgers; George Vaughan	2:51

1990 CD bonus track
No.	Title	Writer(s)	Length
13.	"Her Love Rubbed Off"	Carl Perkins	2:58

1993 CD reissue bonus tracks
No.	Title	Writer(s)	Length
13.	"Her Love Rubbed Off"	Carl Perkins	2:58
14.	"Her Love Rubbed Off" (Live)	Carl Perkins	5:05
15.	"Bikini Girls with Machine Guns" (Live)		3:19

2001 CD reissue bonus tracks
No.	Title	Writer(s)	Length
13.	"Her Love Rubbed Off"	Carl Perkins	2:58
14.	"Her Love Rubbed Off" (Live)	Carl Perkins	5:05
15.	"Bikini Girls with Machine Guns" (Live)		3:19
16.	"Beat Out My Love"	Lee Dresser	2:15
17.	"Jailhouse Rock"	Jerry Leiber; Mike Stoller	2:28
18.	"Jackyard Backoff"		3:17

== Personnel ==
The Cramps

- Lux Interior – vocals
- Poison Ivy Rorschach – guitar
- Candy Del Mar – bass guitar
- Nick Knox – drums

Technical

- Steve Macmillan – engineer
- Lux Interior – front cover photography

== Charts ==
Chart performance for Stay Sick!
Chart (1990)	Peak position
Swedish Albums (Sverigetopplistan)	26
UK Albums (OCC)	62
