= Songs the Lord Taught Us =

Studio album by the Cramps
- Released: 1980
- Recorded: 1979–1980
- Studios: Phillips Recording, Memphis, Tennessee
- Genres: Punk rock; garage rock; garage punk; psychobilly; neo-rockabilly
- Length: 37:53
- Labels: I.R.S. (original US release); Illegal (original UK release); Zonophone (1998 European CD reissue); ViNiLiSSSiMO (2011 Spanish vinyl reissue)
- Producer: Alex Chilton

The Cramps chronology
Gravest Hits (1979)	Songs the Lord Taught Us (1980)	Psychedelic Jungle (1981)

Singles from Songs the Lord Taught Us
- 1. "Garbageman" Released: 1980

Professional ratings
Review scores
Source	Rating
AllMusic	4/5 stars
Christgau's Record Guide	B−
Pitchfork	8.7/10
Record Mirror	4/5 stars
The Rolling Stone Album Guide	3.5/5 stars
Smash Hits	7½/10
Spin Alternative Record Guide	8/10
Tom Hull – on the Web	B+

Songs the Lord Taught Us is the debut album by the American rock band the Cramps. It was released in 1980 on I.R.S. Records in America and Illegal Records in the UK. In 2020, Rolling Stone included Songs the Lord Taught Us in their "80 Greatest albums of 1980" list, praising the band for its "psychobilly sound that went way beyond the kitschiest moments of the Ramones or Blondie and into a whole new realm of garage-trash novelty".

== Music ==
Eric R. Danton of Paste called the album a "weird, funny and loud ... gleefully raw, thoroughly campy collection." He said the album contains "blaring guitars and Lux Interior's unhinged vocals on songs steeped in the twin influences of rockabilly and garish B-movie horror imagery."

== Track listing ==
Writing credits adapted from the album's liner notes.

Side one
No.	Title	Writer(s)	Length
1.	"TV Set"	Poison Ivy Rorschach, Lux Interior	3:12
2.	"Rock on the Moon" (originally performed by Jimmy Stewart)	Jimmy Stewart	1:53
3.	"Garbageman"	Rorschach, Interior	3:37
4.	"I Was a Teenage Werewolf"	Rorschach, Interior	3:03
5.	"Sunglasses After Dark" (originally performed by Dwight "Whitey" Pullen; contains an interpretation of "Ace of Spades", originally performed by Link Wray)	Rorschach, Interior, Dwight Pullen, Link Wray	3:47
6.	"The Mad Daddy"	Rorschach, Interior	3:48

Side two
No.	Title	Writer(s)	Length
7.	"Mystery Plane"	Rorschach, Interior	2:43
8.	"Zombie Dance"	Rorschach, Interior	1:55
9.	"What's Behind the Mask"	Rorschach, Interior	2:05
10.	"Strychnine" (originally performed by the Sonics)	Gerry Roslie	2:24
11.	"I'm Cramped"	Rorschach, Interior, Bryan Gregory, Nick Knox	2:37
12.	"Tear It Up" (originally performed by Johnny Burnette and the Rock and Roll Trio)	Johnny Burnette, Dorsey Burnette, Paul Burlison	2:32
13.	"Fever" (originally performed by Little Willie John)	John Davenport (Otis Blackwell), Eddie Cooley	4:17

Bonus tracks on 1989 compact disc reissue
No.	Title	Writer(s)	Length
14.	"I Was a Teenage Werewolf" (With False Start) (Original Mix)	Rorschach, Interior	4:48
15.	"Mystery Plane" (Original Mix)	Rorschach, Interior	2:39
16.	"Twist and Shout"	Rorschach, Interior	2:32
17.	"I'm Cramped" (Original Mix)	Rorschach, Interior, Gregory, Knox	2:37
18.	"The Mad Daddy" (Original Mix)	Rorschach, Interior	3:15

== Personnel ==
The Cramps

- Lux Interior – vocals
- Poison Ivy Rorschach – guitar
- Bryan Gregory – guitar
- Nick Knox – drums

Additional musicians

- Booker C (Alex Chilton) – organ on "Fever"

Technical

- Alex Chilton – producer
- John Hampton – engineer
- Carl Grasso – art direction
- The Cramps – sleeve concept, mixing
- David Arnoff – photography
