= RockinnReelininAucklandNewZealandXXX =

Live album by The Cramps
- Released: 1987
- Recorded: August 27, 1986
- Venue: The Galaxy, Auckland, New Zealand
- Label: Vengeance
- Producer: Poison Ivy

The Cramps chronology
A Date with Elvis (1986)	RockinnReelininAucklandNewZealandXXX (1987)	Stay Sick! (1990)

Professional ratings
Review scores
Source	Rating
AllMusic	2.5/5 stars

RockinnReelininAucklandNewZealandXXX is the eighth album overall and the second live album by the American rock band the Cramps. It was released on the band's own Vengeance Records. It was mixed by Greg Heiter and recorded live on August 27, 1986, at the Galaxy in Auckland, New Zealand. The track list was heavily drawn from the album A Date with Elvis (1986, Big Beat), released earlier that year. It was reissued in 1994 with the bonus tracks "Blue Moon Baby", "Georgia Lee Brown" and "Lonesome Town".

== Track listing ==
All tracks composed by Lux Interior and Poison Ivy; except where indicated

1. "The Hot Pearl Snatch" – 3:21
2. "People Ain't No Good" – 3:18
3. "What's Inside a Girl?" – 3:06
4. "Cornfed Dames" – 4:49
5. "Sunglasses After Dark" (Rosalind Michelle Pullens, Link Wray) – 4:10
6. "Heartbreak Hotel" (Mae Boren Axton, Thomas Durden, Elvis Presley) – 3:35
7. "Chicken" – 1:37
8. "Do the Clam" (Sid Wayne, Ben Weisman, Dolores Fuller) – 2:43
9. "Aloha from Hell" – 2:41
10. "Can Your Pussy Do the Dog?" – 3:38
11. "Birdfeed" (Al Frazier, Harris, Carl White, Turner Wilson) – 4:09

=== Reissue bonus tracks ===
1. "Blue Moon Baby" (Meridan, Rowe, Satalsk) – 2:43
2. "Georgia Lee Brown" (Robert Hafner, Phil Zinn) – 3:21
3. "Lonesome Town" (Baker Knight) – 3:37

== Personnel ==
The Cramps

- Lux Interior – vocals
- Poison Ivy Rorschach – guitar
- Candy Del Mar – bass guitar
- Nick Knox – drums

Technical

- Greg Heiter – sound mix
- David Cheppa – remastering
- Kent J. Smythe – front cover photography
