= Smell of Female =

Live album by The Cramps
- Released: 1983
- Recorded: February 25–26, 1983
- Venue: Peppermint Lounge, New York City
- Length: 20:16
- Label: Big Beat, Enigma, New Rose Records
- Producer: The Cramps

The Cramps chronology
Psychedelic Jungle (1981)	Smell of Female (1983)	...Off the Bone (1983)

Professional ratings
Review scores
Source	Rating
AllMusic	3.5/5 stars

Smell of Female is the first live album by the American rock band the Cramps. The mini-album was recorded at The Peppermint Lounge in New York City on February 25–26, 1983, and issued the same year on Big Beat Records in the UK, Enigma Records in the US and New Rose Records in France. It was also released by New Rose as a quadruple-7" box set, with an additional track, "Weekend on Mars". It was later expanded to album length with three bonus tracks.

== Track listing ==
All tracks are written by Lux Interior and Poison Ivy Rorschach except where indicated.

No.	Title	Writer(s)	Length
1.	"Thee Most Exalted Potentate of Love"		3:03
2.	"You Got Good Taste"		3:26
3.	"Call of the Wighat"		3:47
4.	"Faster Pussycat"	Bert Shefter	2:47
5.	"I Ain't Nuthin' But a Gorehound"		3:16
6.	"Psychotic Reaction"	Kenn Ellner, Roy Chaney, Craig Atkinson, Sean Byrne, John Michalski	3:54

Bonus tracks
No.	Title	Writer(s)	Length
7.	"Beautiful Gardens"		3:07
8.	"She Said"	Hasil Adkins	5:18
9.	"Surfin' Dead"		4:12
Total length:			32:54

== Personnel ==
=== The Cramps ===
- Lux Interior – vocals, harmonica, percussion
- Poison Ivy Rorschach – lead guitar, bass
- Kid Congo Powers – guitar
- Nick Knox – drums

=== Technical ===
- Paul McKenna – engineer
- Eddy Schreyer – mastering
- Da Lux – cover
