= Gravest Hits =

EP by The Cramps
- Released: July 1979
- Recorded: Ardent Studios, Memphis; October 1977
- Genre: Punk rock
- Length: 16:29
- Label: Illegal/I.R.S.
- Producer: Alex Chilton

The Cramps chronology
Gravest Hits (1979)	Songs the Lord Taught Us (1980)

Professional ratings
Review scores
Source	Rating
AllMusic	3/5 stars

Gravest Hits is the first 12" EP by the American rock band the Cramps, compiling both sides of their first two 1978 Vengeance singles, "Surfin' Bird" and "Human Fly", with an added fifth track, a cover version of "Lonesome Town". It was released in July 1979 on Illegal Records and I.R.S. Records. The tracks were all produced by Alex Chilton and recorded at Ardent Studios in Memphis in 1977. The EP's liner notes were credited to "Dr. J.H. Sasfy, Professor of Rockology, American Rock'n'Roll Institute, Washington D.C., U.S.A.". Gravest Hits is one of the first records of both the rockabilly revival and the psychobilly genres. The photograph on the back of the original sleeve, of the band in performance, was taken at the CBGB's 2nd Avenue Theatre (formerly The Anderson Theatre) in New York City.

"Human Fly" appeared in episode 4 of the UK ITV comedy drama series Married Single Other as Clint scaled four floors of a block of flats in Leeds to try to recover his relationship with Abbie. A cover version of the song by Hanni El Khatib also appeared in a Nissan television advertisement. Another cover version was recorded by the Serbian alternative rock band Supernaut on their 2006 album Eli.

== Track listing ==
Writing credits adapted from the EP's liner notes.

Side one
No.	Title	Writer(s)	Length
1.	"Human Fly" (1978 single)	Poison Ivy Rorschach, Lux Interior	2:15
2.	"The Way I Walk" (originally performed by Jack Scott; B-side of "Surfin' Bird" single, 1978)	Jack Scott	2:43
3.	"Domino" (originally performed by Roy Orbison; B-side of "Human Fly" single, 1978)	Sam Phillips	3:08

Side two
No.	Title	Writer(s)	Length
4.	"Surfin' Bird" (originally performed by the Trashmen; 1978 single)	Al Frazier, Sonny Harris, Carl White, Turner Wilson (credited to Steve Wahrer)	5:08
5.	"Lonesome Town" (originally performed by Ricky Nelson)	Baker Knight	3:15

== Personnel ==
- Lux Interior - vocals
- Poison Ivy Rorschach - guitar
- Bryan Gregory - guitar
- Nick Knox - drums
