= Big Beat from Badsville =

Studio album by The Cramps
- Released: 1997
- Recorded: May 1997
- Studio: Earle's Psychedelic Shack, Thousand Oaks, California
- Label: Epitaph
- Producer: Poison Ivy, Lux Interior

The Cramps chronology
Flamejob (1994)	Big Beat from Badsville (1997)	Fiends of Dope Island (2003)

Professional ratings
Review scores
Source	Rating
AllMusic	3/5 stars
NME	3/10
(The New) Rolling Stone Album Guide	2/5 stars

Big Beat from Badsville is the seventh studio album by the American rock band the Cramps. It was released in 1997 on Epitaph Records.

The album was recorded and mixed at engineer Earle Mankey's house in Thousand Oaks, California, in May 1997. It was produced by Poison Ivy and Lux Interior. It is the only Cramps album to consist solely of original songs.

The Cramps reissued the album on their own record label, Vengeance Records, in 2001 with four bonus tracks: "Confessions of a Psycho Cat", "No Club Lone Wolf", "I Walked All Night" and "Peter Gunn".

== Track listing ==
All tracks are written by Lux Interior and Poison Ivy Rorschach.

Side 1
No.	Title	Length
1.	"Cramp Stomp"	3:25
2.	"God Monster"	4:06
3.	"It Thing Hard-On"	2:48
4.	"Like a Bad Girl Should"	3:05
5.	"Sheena's in a Goth Gang"	2:44
6.	"Queen of Pain"	3:50
7.	"Monkey With Your Tail"	3:37

Side 2
No.	Title	Length
1.	"Devil Behind That Bush"	3:33
2.	"Super Goo"	2:27
3.	"Hypno Sex Ray"	2:26
4.	"Burn She-Devil, Burn"	2:23
5.	"Wet Nightmare"	3:36
6.	"Badass Bug"	2:25
7.	"Haulass Hyena"	2:48

2001 CD reissue bonus tracks
No.	Title	Writer(s)	Length
15.	"Confessions of a Psycho Cat"	Interior, Rorschach	3:32
16.	"No Club Lone Wolf"	Interior, Rorschach	2:28
17.	"I Walked All Night"	Hargus "Pig" Robbins	2:49
18.	"Peter Gunn"	Henry Mancini	3:10

== Personnel ==
The Cramps

- Lux Interior - vocals
- Poison Ivy Rorschach - guitars, theremin
- Slim Chance - bass guitar
- Harry Drumdini - drums

Technical

- Earle Mankey - engineer
- Nick Rubenstein, The Cramps - art direction
- Lux Interior - front cover photography
