= Vernal Presbyterian Church =

Historic church in Mississippi, United States

- U.S. National Register of Historic Places
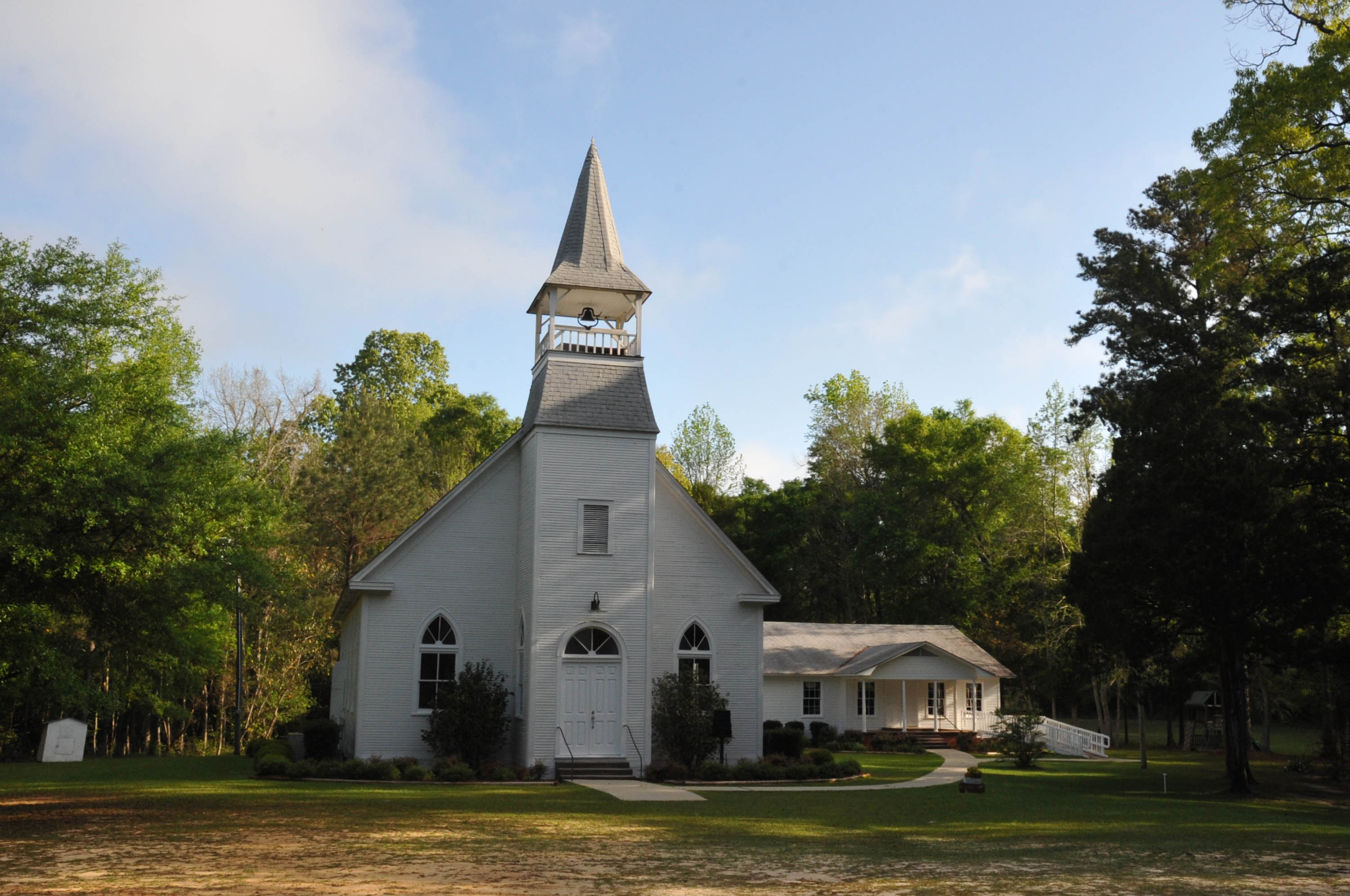
- Front of church in 2008

- Location within Mississippi Location within the United States
- Location: 455 McInnis-Vernal Rd.
- Nearest city: Lucedale, Mississippi
- Coordinates: 31°2′4″N 88°36′42″W
- Area: 3 acres (1.2 ha)
- Built: 1906-1908
- Architectural style: Gothic Revival
- NRHP reference No.: 02001389
- Added to NRHP: 18 November 2002

Vernal Presbyterian Church is a historic church near Lucedale, Mississippi in the unincorporated community of Vernal.

== Description and history ==
The church is a one-story, gable fronted rectangular example of Gothic Revival style architecture. The building faces south fronting a road that runs from Vernal River Road to Winborn Chapel Road. An approximately 55-foot (17 m) tall tower rises from a foyer in front of the sanctuary. The sanctuary has a steep gable roof covered with shingles. The tower has a belfry with open handrails and a very steeply angled steeple roof. There are two windows with Gothic art glass transoms flanking the entry. The character of the building is further enhanced by the five windows on the east and west elevation with similar transoms. The rear elevation (north) contains an addition for a Sunday school from 1954 and a wing added to that addition of a fellowship hall from 1974. Inside the sanctuary ceiling is 20 feet (6.1 m) high and original fittings and details remain. These include choir seating and a lectern as well as a communion table and pulpit chairs from the congregation's previous church.

The items from the old church were donated by Captain Murdoch who is said to have brought them from Mobile, Alabama via ox-drawn cart. The congregation first organized in 1880 mostly from Scottish and Irish Americans. They built the old church in 1882. Plans to build the current Vernal Presbyterian Church were made in 1905 and it was built in from 1906 to 1908 entirely by volunteers from the congregation. The address of the church is 455 McInnis-Vernal Road. The property was added to the United States National Register of Historic Places on November 18, 2002.

As of December 2022, the congregation is a member of the Evangelical Presbyterian Church.

== See also ==
- National Register of Historic Place listings in Greene County, Mississippi
- Presbyterianism
