= Flamejob =

Studio album by The Cramps
- Released: October 11, 1994
- Recorded: 1994
- Studios: Earle's Psychedelic Shack (Thousand Oaks, California)
- Genre: Psychobilly
- Length: 44.51
- Label: Creation
- Producers: Poison Ivy, Lux Interior

The Cramps chronology
Look Mom No Head! (1991)	Flamejob (1994)	Big Beat from Badsville (1997)

Singles from Flamejob
- 1. "Lets Get Fucked Up / How Come You Do Me" Released: 1994; 2. "Ultra Twist / No Club Lone Wolf" Released: 1994; 3. "Naked Girl Falling Down the Stairs / Confessions of a Psycho Cat" Released: 1995

Professional ratings
Review scores
Source	Rating
AllMusic	3/5 stars

Flamejob is the sixth studio album (and 11th album overall) by the American rock band The Cramps. It was released on October 11, 1994, by Creation Records. It was recorded and mixed at the engineer Earle Mankey's Psychedelic Shack in Thousand Oaks, California. It was self-produced by Poison Ivy and Lux Interior (the latter also provided the cover photography). A UK-only reissue in 2003 contained two versions of "Ultra Twist!"

== Track listing ==
All tracks are written by Lux Interior and Poison Ivy Rorschach; except where indicated.

Side one
No.	Title	Length
1.	"Mean Machine"	3:57
2.	"Ultra Twist!"	3:48
3.	"Let's Get Fucked Up"	3:55
4.	"Nest of the Cuckoo Bird"	3:26
5.	"I'm Customized"	3:04
6.	"Sado County Auto Show"	2:59
7.	"Naked Girl Falling Down the Stairs"	2:44

Side two
No.	Title	Writer(s)	Length
1.	"How Come You Do Me?"	Joiner	2:17
2.	"Inside Out and Upside Down (With You)"		2:27
3.	"Trapped Love"	Jimmy Testo	2:00
4.	"Swing the Big Eyed Rabbit"		3:39
5.	"Strange Love"	Jerry West	2:49
6.	"Blues, Blues, Blues"	Hayden Thompson	2:23
7.	"Sinners"	Freddie Alridge	2:06
8.	"Route 66 (Get Your Kicks On)"	Bobby Troup	3:17

2003 UK CD reissue bonus tracks
No.	Title	Notes	Length
16.	"Confessions of a Psycho Cat"
17.	"No Club Lone Wolf"
18.	"Ultra Twist"	CD-ROM Video (Clean Version)
19.	"Ultra Twist"	CD-ROM Video (X-Rated Version)

== Personnel ==
The Cramps

- Lux Interior - vocals
- Poison Ivy Rorschach - guitars, theremin
- Slim Chance - bass guitar
- Harry Drumdini - drums

Technical

- Earle Mankey - engineer
- Pat Dillon - design
- Lux Interior - front cover photography
