= Green Fuz =

American garage rock band

- Origin: Bridgeport, Texas, US
- Genres: Garage rock, psychedelic rock
- Years active: 1967–1969, 2008
- Label: Big Tex Records
- Past members: Randy Alvey (died 2014); Mike Pearce; Jimmy Mercer; Les Dale; R.E. "Buck" Houchins

Green Fuz were an American garage rock band in the late 1960s, best known for their sole single, "Green Fuz", which became a classic of the genre and was covered by The Cramps.

== History ==
The group was formed in Bridgeport, Texas. The members were Randy Alvey (vocals), Mike Pearce (drums), Jimmy Mercer (rhythm guitar), Les Dale (lead guitar), and R.E. "Buck" Houchins (bass). Alvey and Pearce formed their first group, the Psychedelic Reactions, in 1967; after some personnel changes, they became the Green Fuz, named for Dale's green fuzz box. Alvey, Pearce and Houchins were later involved in another group, Natchez.

The Green Fuz played at dances and clubs, gaining enough local popularity to persuade the co-owner of Wash-Tex Records, Shorty Hendrix, to record their self-written theme song. The recording took place at The Cross Roads Cafe, a deserted roadside cafe chosen for its acoustics, which was owned by Dale's mother. The single was issued locally in 1969 on the Big Tex Records label. It was not a success, largely because the primitive recording techniques led to a muffled sound, which subsequently contributed to its cult appeal. On the single, the band was identified as Randy Alvey and the Green Fuz; while the B-side, "There Is a Land", was attributed to R. E. Houchins and the Green Fuz. Dale and Alvey both stated that these were errors by the record company and that both should have been simply listed as the Green Fuz.

The record resurfaced in the late 1970s on a prominent garage rock compilation album, Pebbles, Volume 2, and subsequently appeared on many similar compilation albums. One of those albums, Acid Dreams Epitaph, was subtitled 75 Minutes of Green Fuz. The band gained additional fans when "Green Fuz" was covered by the Cramps on their 1981 album Psychedelic Jungle.

The 2008 edition of New Orleans roots music festival Ponderosa Stomp featured a reunion by the Green Fuz, after the festival's founder, Dr. Ira Padnos, located Green Fuz lead guitarist Dale in Virginia Beach, Virginia, where he had retired after two decades in the U. S. Navy.

In 2009, the song "Green Fuz" was included by Evan Dando's the Lemonheads on their well-received covers album, Varshons. This version has a much slower tempo than either the original version or the Cramps version.

Alvey died on March 16, 2014.

== Discography ==
=== Singles ===
- "Green Fuz" (1969, Big Tex Records)

=== Compilation appearances ===
- "Green Fuz" on Pebbles, Volume 2 (1979, BFD Records)
