= Charlie Feathers (album) =

Studio album by Charlie Feathers
- Released: 1991
- Studio: Recording Service
- Genre: Rockabilly
- Label: Elektra/Nonesuch
- Producer: Ben Vaughn

Charlie Feathers chronology
Gone Gone Gone (1991)	Charlie Feathers (1991)	I Ain't Done Yet (1993)

Charlie Feathers is an album by the American rockabilly musician Charlie Feathers, released in 1991. His final studio album, it was part of the Elektra/Nonesuch "American Explorer" series. It was Feathers's only album to be put out by a major label.

== Production ==
Produced by Ben Vaughn, the album was recorded at Sam Phillips's Recording Service. Seven of the album's songs were written by Feathers. Feathers was joined by his son, Bubba, on guitar, along with bassist Stan Kesler, drummer James Van Eaton, and guitarist Roland Janes. The album contains a version of "I Forgot to Remember to Forget", cowritten by Feathers and Kesler in 1955.

Feathers was not entirely happy with the way the album turned out, partly because he had wanted total control over its production. He penned the liner notes, where he claims to have mentored Elvis Presley, and then argues that Presley abandoned "real" music when he signed with RCA Records.

== Critical reception ==
Professional ratings
Review scores
Source	Rating
AllMusic	4.5/5 stars
Austin American-Statesman	3.5/4 stars
Calgary Herald	C
Robert Christgau	A−
The Encyclopedia of Popular Music	3/5 stars
Houston Chronicle	5/5 stars
MusicHound Rock: The Essential Album Guide	3/5 stars
The Rolling Stone Album Guide	3/5 stars

Robert Christgau concluded that "Feathers refuses to insult anyone's intelligence pretending he's horny as a teenager, putting his past behind him in the forlorn collection of old song titles 'We Can't Seem To Remember To Forget' ... His resonant bullfrog undertone and hiccuping upper register evoking a less cocky George Jones, he explores rockabilly as a musical form—the white man's blues he's always saying it is." Greil Marcus, in Artforum, called Feathers "a quirky, sometimes doggedly weird rockabilly survival, now lapsing into birdcalls and animal noises, now pumping his legend, and then (as, here, on 'A Long Time Ago') shifting without warning into a reverie—loose, spooky, wailing, and more than anything emotionally unclear—of the way things never were, of the man he never was." The Fort Worth Star-Telegram thought that Feathers's "craggy countrybilly sound is wholly his own, a mixture of country truck-driver ballads and spare rockabilly that—with Feathers' voice constantly jumping from a low, sly growl to a hiccup to a moan and back again—sounds like what Buddy Holly might have sounded like in 1991." The St. Louis Post-Dispatch sniffed: "Feathers' singing ability—or lack of same—disproves those old claims that you can cover up bad vocals through echo."

The Austin American-Statesman deemed Feathers "one of the original rockabilly renegades," writing that he "offers testament to the music as a primal lifeforce rather than a nostalgic fashion statement." The Calgary Herald called the album "the only weak link" in the "American Explorer" series. The Philadelphia Inquirer opined that "Feathers writes songs that alternate convoluted wisdom with lucid directness, and these extremes are reinforced by his delivery, which ranges from eerie deadpan to enthusiastic shouts." The Houston Chronicle labeled Charlie Feathers "a treasure of rockabilly so pure that its genesis even precedes typical rockabilly as we've come to know it."

AllMusic thought that "all the playing here is expert, authentic, and full of raw immediacy," writing that Feathers "is a man haunted by the past eternally, trying to make it a renewable present, and offering the truth in how forgotten it all is in his delivery." The Rolling Stone Album Guide stated that, "like so many of the original rockabilly artists, Feathers comes on with body and soul intact, hiccuping and growling his way through more country and rockabilly, as unpredictable as ever."

== Track listing ==
No.	Title	Length
1.	"A Man in Love"
2.	"When You Come Around"
3.	"Pardon Me Mister"
4.	"Fraulein"
5.	"Defrost Your Heart"
6.	"Mean Woman Blues"
7.	"(I Don't Care) If Tomorrow Never Comes"
8.	"Cootzie Coo"
9.	"We Can't Seem to Remember to Forget"
10.	"A Long Time Ago"
11.	"Seasons of My Heart"
12.	"Uh Huh Honey"
13.	"You're Right, I'm Left, She's Gone"
14.	"Oklahoma Hills"
