= Fiends of Dope Island =

Studio album by The Cramps
- Released: 2003
- Recorded: August 2002
- Genres: Psychobilly; garage punk
- Length: 45:10
- Label: Vengeance Records
- Producers: Poison Ivy, Lux Interior

The Cramps chronology
Big Beat from Badsville (1997)	Fiends of Dope Island (2003)	How to Make a Monster (2004)

Professional ratings
Review scores
Source	Rating
AllMusic	3/5 stars

Fiends of Dope Island is the eighth and final studio album (and 13th album overall) by the American rock band the Cramps. The Cramps resurrected their own record label Vengeance Records to release the album in 2003. It was recorded in Hollywood in August 2002. It was self-produced by Poison Ivy and Lux Interior. The album takes its title from the 1959 film, Fiend of Dope Island. "Fissure of Rolando" was dedicated to John Agar (1921-2002).

== Track listing ==
All tracks are written by Lux Interior and Poison Ivy Rorschach; except where indicated.

Side 1
No.	Title	Writer(s)	Length
1.	"Big Black Witchcraft Rock"		3:28
2.	"Papa Satan Sang Louie"		2:48
3.	"Hang Up"	Ron Gardner	2:44
4.	"Fissure of Rolando"		3:53
5.	"Dr. Fucker M.D. (Musical Deviant)"		3:17
6.	"Dopefiend Boogie"		4:21
7.	"Taboo"	Bob Russell, Margarita Lecuona	3:48

Side 2
No.	Title	Writer(s)	Length
1.	"Elvis Fucking Christ!"		3:18
2.	"She's Got Balls"		2:59
3.	"Oowee Baby"	Jerry Reed	3:08
4.	"Mojo Man from Mars"		2:59
5.	"Color Me Black"		4:02
6.	"Wrong Way Ticket"		4:25

== Personnel ==
The Cramps

- Lux Interior - vocals, harmonica, maracas
- Poison Ivy Rorschach - guitars, echo-theremin
- Chopper Franklin - bass guitar, rhythm guitar on "Taboo"
- Harry Drumdini - drums

Technical

- Rocky Schenck - photography
- Jimmy Hole - "lurid" layout
- Lux Interior - typography "fiends lettering"

Mixed and mastered at Earle Mankey's Psychedelic Shack, Thousand Oaks, California
