= Look Mom No Head! =

Studio album by The Cramps
- Released: November 1991
- Recorded: June 21 – July 14, 1991
- Studio: Ocean Way, Hollywood, California
- Length: 48:31
- Label: Restless, Enigma
- Producer: Poison Ivy

The Cramps chronology
Stay Sick! (1990)	Look Mom No Head! (1991)	Flamejob (1994)

Professional ratings
Review scores
Source	Rating
AllMusic	2/5 stars
The Rolling Stone Album Guide	3.5/5 stars

Look Mom No Head! is the fifth studio album and the 10th album overall by the American rock band the Cramps. It was released in November 1991 by Restless/Enigma, and licensed to Ace Records under Big Beat in the UK. It was recorded and mixed by Steve McMillan at Ocean Way Studios in Hollywood between June 21 and July 14, 1991. It was self-produced by Cramps guitarist Poison Ivy. Iggy Pop guested on the track "Miniskirt Blues", which was originally recorded by the Flower Children in 1967.

The Cramps reissued the album on their own Vengeance Records in 2001. The reissue contained two bonus tracks: "Wilder Wilder Faster Faster" and "Jelly Roll Rock".

== Track listing ==
All tracks are written by Lux Interior and Poison Ivy Rorschach; except where indicated.

Side 1
No.	Title	Writer(s)	Length
1.	"Dames, Booze, Chains and Boots"		4:35
2.	"Two Headed Sex Change"		2:52
3.	"Blow up Your Mind"		4:29
4.	"Hard Workin' Man"	Ry Cooder, Jack Nitzsche, Paul Schrader	4:02
5.	"Miniskirt Blues"	L. Bedlen, L. Starr, Simon Stokes	2:39
6.	"Alligator Stomp"		4:04

Side 2
No.	Title	Writer(s)	Length
1.	"I Wanna Get in Your Pants"		4:19
2.	"Bend Over, I'll Drive"		4:05
3.	"Don't Get Funny with Me"		3:23
4.	"Eyeball in My Martini"		3:20
5.	"Hipsville 29 B.C."	Don Turnbow	2:32
6.	"The Strangeness in Me"	Ellis Mize	3:17

CD bonus track
No.	Title	Length
13.	"Wilder Wilder Faster Faster"	4:55

2001 CD reissue bonus tracks
No.	Title	Writer(s)	Length
13.	"Wilder Wilder Faster Faster"		4:55
14.	"Jelly Roll Rock"	Wilks	2:27

== Personnel ==
The Cramps

- Lux Interior - vocals
- Poison Ivy Rorschach - guitar
- Slim Chance - bass guitar
- Jim Sclavunos - drums

with:

- Iggy Pop - vocals on "Miniskirt Blues"

Technical

- Steve Macmillan - recording, mixing
- Lux Interior - cover design, photography
