= Mack McInnis =

American politician (1934–2013)

Mack McInnis (March 16, 1934 – March 31, 2013) was an American politician.

Born in Vernal, Mississippi, McInnis served in the United States Army during the Korean War. McInnis was a high school teacher and football coach in Leakesville, Mississippi. McInnis served in the Mississippi House of Representatives 1976-1980 and 1992-2000 as a Democrat. He died in Ocean Springs, Mississippi.
