= Jerry Lott =

American rockabilly musician (1938–1983)

Jerry "Marty" Lott
- Also known as: Marty Lott, The Phantom
- Born: Jerry Lott; January 30, 1938; Prichard, Alabama, U.S.
- Died: September 4, 1983 (aged 45) Vernal, Mississippi, U.S.
- Genres: Rockabilly, country music
- Instruments: Lead vocals, guitar
- Years active: 1958–1966
- Label: Dot Records

Jerry "Marty" Lott (January 30, 1938 – September 4, 1983), marketed as The Phantom, was an American singer-songwriter best known for the rockabilly composition "Love Me" recorded in 1958 and released on Dot Records in 1960. Though commercially unsuccessful upon release, Love Me has since been recognized as one of the most distinctive recordings of its era.

Dregni et al (2011) have referred to Lott retroactively as "The Lone Rane Ranger of Rockabilly" and "The Kiss of Hillbilly Bop" His identity uncertain until the 1970s, contemporaries simply referred to the enigmatic "man behind the mask" as The Phantom, inspired by comic strip character, a persona and marketing epithet reportedly conceived in collaboration with Pat Boone, who facilitated the release of Lott's single.

== Early life ==
Jerry Lott was born on January 30, 1938 in Prichard, Alabama, son of Bill Washington and Bertha McLeod Lott. Raised in Leakesville, Mississippi, he began learning guitar and performing country music in 1952, playing at public school talent shows and community events at local venues (source: White Label Records, 2005) Lott served in the United States Navy from April 19, 1956 until December 3, 1957.

== Musical career ==
=== Early influences and recording ===
Following his discharge from the Navy in December 1957, Lott was significantly influenced by the emergence of Elvis Presley, later recalling in a 1980 interview that Presley "turned his head around" and redirected him from country music toward a wilder rock and roll style.

In June 1958, Lott rented studio time entered Gulf Coast Studios in Mobile, Alabama, on rented studio time, and produced two original compositions: "Love Me" and "Whisper Your Love." The musicians on the session were Frank Holmes on electric guitar, Pete McCord on electric bass, Bill Yates on piano, and H.H. Brooks on drums. Lott later recalled the chaotic session: "It was wild. The drummer lost one of his sticks, the piano player screamed and knocked his stool over, the guitar player's glasses were hanging sideways over his eyes." According to Lott's own account, "Love Me" was written in approximately ten minutes.

=== Pat Boone and Dot Records ===
Following the recording session, Lott traveled to Los Angeles seeking a record deal. There, known at this time by the nickname "The Gulf Coast Fireball," he located Pat Boone at a church and persuaded him to listen to the master tape. Boone subsequently facilitated the release of the recordings through Dot Records. The stage name The Phantom and the distinctive Lee Falk comic-strip-character mask Lott wore at all times on stage was reportedly Boone's idea. In Boone's own recollection: "I had this idea that if an artist came along like Elvis, but with an air of mystery, where nobody knew who he was and he wore a mask and called himself the Phantom (which was my favorite comic book character), that he could be a smash! The kids would love him!" Boone initially intended to release the single on his own record label, Cooga Mooga, but ultimately arranged for Lott to sign with road manager Johnny Blackburn, and sign with Dot Records. The single was released by Dot in January 1960, packaged in a picture sleeve. Lott signed a contract with Boone's management and, according to his own account, never met anyone at Dot Records directly. Despite its extraordinary sonic character, the single failed to chart commercially. Dot Records dropped Lott shortly thereafter. Lott is reported to have made a television appearance on American Bandstand to promote the single, during which his mask slipped and he missed the lip-sync of "Love Me."

== Post-release activity ==
Following the single's commercial failure, Lott continued performing regionally, spanning the Mobile, Nashville, and Piedmont. An incident involving a steep fall resulted in Lott sustaining a severe neck injury around July 22, 1966, while he was residing in Glendale, South Carolina. He was treated at Greenville General Hospital, Greenville, South Carolina, where he was reported in poor condition with a neck injury from July 23 through at least July 25, 1966. The accident left him paralyzed from the neck down, ending his performing career. Following the accident, Lott returned to Greene County, Mississippi, where he lived in the Vernal community until his death. He continued to write songs but never recorded again, and his identity remained unknown.

In 1977, the Milwaukee, Wisconsin music publication Mean Mountain, featured an expose authored by local researchers, Skip Rose and Jim Barkey. This article identified Lott by name and was subsequently appended by Derek Glenister based upon telephone correspondence with Lott, published in New Kommotion No. 24. Neither of these two articles have been digitized, but Norm Katuna has transcribed segments of Glenister's writing, which can be found These two articles — neither of which has been digitized — remain the closest available sources to Lott's own account and are the origin point for the majority of biographical details that appear in subsequent secondary literature.

=== Personal life ===
Lott and Billie Faye Starling married on November 8, 1958 in George County, Mississippi, but separated following the release and promotion of Lott's single. Starling remarried and had fraternal twins, all of whom died on February 11, 1973, in a two-car accident on U.S. Highway 45, two miles west of Tupelo, Mississippi.

Lott died on September 4, 1983, in Vernal, Mississippi, at the age of 45. He is buried at Scotland Cemetery, Leakesville, Greene County, Mississippi, under the name Marty Lott, with the epitaph "He's free – as the wind blows."

== Legacy ==
Although "Love Me" failed commercially upon its 1960 release, it attracted significant attention during the rockabilly revival of the early 1980s. The British rockabilly band, The Blue Cats, recorded one of the earliest cover versions of "Love Me" on their 1981 album Fight Back. According to Pat Boone, Lott contacted him during this period to discuss publishing royalties arising from a contemporary cover of "Love Me" by a British rockabilly act; Boone identified this act as The Stray Cats, though no recording of "Love Me" by The Stray Cats has been documented in their released discography, and The Blue Cats' 1981 version remains the only confirmed British cover from that period.

Miriam Linna, co-founder of Norton Records, wrote enthusiastically about the recording in Kicks Magazine No. 3 (1984). The Cramps covered "Love Me" on their 1984 compilation Bad Music for Bad People, introducing Lott's recording to the post-punk and psychobilly underground. The Bananamen, a side project of British rockabilly band The Sting-rays, also recorded a version. "Love Me" was used in a Southern Comfort television advertisement in 2014.
