= Vernal, Mississippi =

- Unincorporated community
- Location within Mississippi Location within the United States
- Coordinates: 31°02′19″N 88°36′39″W
- Country: United States
- State: Mississippi
- County: Greene
- Elevation: 85 ft (26 m)
- Time zone: UTC-6 (Central (CST))
  - Summer (DST): UTC-5 (CDT)
- Area codes: 601 & 769
- GNIS feature ID: 692293

Vernal is an unincorporated community in Greene County, Mississippi, United States.

Vernal was one of the earliest settled areas of Greene County and was named for an early settler from Scotland. It was once home to Vernal Male and Female Academy, the Vernal School, and the Vernal Consolidated Rural School.

A post office operated under the name Vernal from 1843 to 1956.

The Vernal Presbyterian Church is listed on the National Register of Historic Places.

== Notable people ==
- Mack McInnis, Mississippi legislator
