= Fur Dixon =

American singer-songwriter

- Born: Jennifer Dixon c. 1960 (age 65–66); White Plains, New York, United States
- Genres: Punk rock, psychobilly, rock
- Instrument(s): Bass guitar, guitar
- Website: www.furdixon.com

Fur Dixon is an American singer, songwriter, bassist, guitarist and rock 'n' roll musician. She co-founded the Hollywood Hillbillys with guitarist and then-husband Gary Dickson in the mid-1980s and was the first bass player in any lineup of The Cramps to appear live in concert with the band. She joined the band for their 1986 UK "A Date With Elvis Tour." She appears on The Cramps studio album A Date With Elvis, credited as a member of The McMartin Preschool Choir, singing backing vocals on the track "People Ain't No Good."

== Background ==
Prior to the Hollywood Hillbillys, who were known for having live roosters and chickens onstage during their concerts, she was in The Whirlybirds.

After leaving The Cramps, she fronted the bands Blow Up and The Dixons and went on to release 3 full-length studio albums with folk/American singer guitarist Steve Werner. The duo also released a live album. She put together a new band called WTFUKUSHIMA! in 2016 and is releasing a new album in 2018.
