= Bryan Gregory =

- Born: Gregory Beckerleg; February 20, 1951; Detroit, Michigan, U.S.
- Died: January 10, 2001 (aged 49) Anaheim, California, U.S.
- Genres: Psychobilly, garage punk, punk rock
- Occupations: Guitarist, songwriter
- Instrument: Guitar
- Years active: 1976–2001
- Formerly of: The Cramps, Beast, The Dials

Bryan Gregory (né Gregory Beckerleg; February 20, 1951 – January 10, 2001) was an American rock musician, and founding member of and guitarist for The Cramps.

== Biography ==
Gregory met Cramps member Lux Interior when they worked together at a record store in NYC. He shared a birthday with fellow member Poison Ivy. In April 1976, Bryan took up second guitar and was a distinctive sight in the early incarnation of The Cramps, along with his sister Pam Balaam (Pam Beckerleg) on drums. He was known for his oozing guitar sound, wild stage antics, and long black and white striped hair. He appeared on The Cramps' first two albums Gravest Hits and Songs the Lord Taught Us. He abruptly left the band in 1980 and was later replaced by Kid Congo Powers from the Gun Club. Due to his spooky on-stage persona, fans circulated rumors that he had left the band to practice Satanism.

After the Cramps, Gregory went on to play in Beast from 1980–1983. Bryan collaborated with producer Robyn Hunt, an Australian whom he married in Cleveland, Ohio on March 6, 1984. Robyn and Bryan went onto create a horror TV show host called "Freezer" with writer Char Rao, a former Cramps associate who played in the video. Bryan played a zombie in George A. Romero's Day of the Dead with fellow zombie fans Mike Metoff (Pagans guitarist and, at the time, temporary guitarist with The Cramps), and Char Rao in Pittsburgh.

Bryan, Robyn and child moved to Sarasota, Florida, where Bryan and Robyn later divorced amicably. His startling appearance was too much for some and finding a job proved near impossible. Eventually he landed a job managing an adult bookstore in Sarasota, Florida, where he settled for several years, joining his sister Pam Beckerleg in Osprey, Florida. At the time of his death, Gregory had been losing interest in his music goals. He reportedly was feeling "exhausted and run down", according to his ex-wife Robyn (with whom he remained close friends), having put it down to working nights and taking care of a sick friend full-time. According to a former bandmate from The Dials, Gregory was suffering from AIDS. Prior to his death, he drove himself to the emergency room for a check-up at 4 a.m. on January 10, 2001. Once there, he was transferred to Anaheim Memorial Medical Center, where he died of heart failure. Gregory's ashes are buried at Rose Hills Memorial Park in Whittier, California.
