= Charlie Feathers =

American singer-songwriter (1932–1998)

- Born: Charles Arthur Feathers; June 12, 1932; Holly Springs, Mississippi, U.S.
- Died: August 29, 1998 (aged 66) Memphis, Tennessee, U.S.
- Genres: Rockabilly; country
- Occupations: Singer-songwriter, musician

Charles Arthur Feathers (June 12, 1932 – August 29, 1998) was an American musician most associated with the rockabilly scene of the 1950s. Although not initially recognized for his contributions to rockabilly, over time his presence would become greatly elevated and he has been cited as an influence by a number of musicians.

== Biography ==
Feathers was born in Holly Springs, Mississippi, United States.

He started out as a session musician at Sun Studios, playing any side instrument he could in the hopes of someday making his own music there. He eventually played on a small label started by Sam Phillips called Flip records which got him enough attention to record a couple of singles for Sun Records and Holiday Inn Records. By all accounts the singer was not held in much regard by Phillips, but Feathers often made the audacious claim that he had arranged "That's All Right" and "Blue Moon of Kentucky" for Elvis Presley. He also claimed that his "We're Getting Closer (To Being Apart)" had been intended to be Presley's sixth single for Sun. He did, however, get his name on one of Presley's Sun records, "I Forgot to Remember to Forget" when the writer Stan Kesler asked him to record a demo of the song.

He then moved on to Meteor Records and then King Records where he recorded his best-known work. His 1950s singles included "Peepin' Eyes", "Defrost Your Heart", "Tongue-Tied Jill" and "Bottle to the Baby". When his King contract ran out he still continued to perform, although Feathers thought there was a conspiracy to keep his music from gaining the popularity it deserved.

In the mid-1980s, he performed at times at new music nightclubs like the Antenna Club in Memphis, Tennessee, sharing the bill with rock-and-roll bands like Tav Falco's Panther Burns, who, as devoted fans of Feathers, had introduced him to their label's president.

He released his New Jungle Fever album in 1987 and Honkey Tonk Man in 1988, featuring the lead guitar work of his son, Bubba Feathers. These later albums of original songs penned by Feathers were released on the French label New Rose Records, whose other 1980s releases included albums by Johnny Thunders, Alex Chilton, Moe Tucker, Roky Erickson, The Saints (Australian band), The Sonics, Dr. Feelgood, The Cramps, The Gun Club, and others.

He died on August 29, 1998, of complications from a stroke-induced coma. He was buried at Forest Hill Cemetery South in Memphis.

== Style and influences ==
Charlie Feathers studied and recorded several songs with Junior Kimbrough, whom he called "the beginning and end of all music". His childhood influences were reflected in his later music of the 1970s and 1980s, which had an easy-paced, sometimes sinister, country-blues tempo, as opposed to the frenetic fast-paced style favored by some of his rockabilly colleagues of the 1950s. Feathers was known for being a master of shifting emotional and sonic dynamics in his songs. His theatrical, hiccup-styled, energetic, rockabilly vocal style inspired a later generation of rock vocalists, including Lux Interior of The Cramps.

Feathers' song, "That Certain Female" was featured on the soundtrack to Quentin Tarantino's 2003 film, Kill Bill: Volume 1. His "Can't Hardly Stand It" was featured on the follow-up Kill Bill: Volume 2 soundtrack, as well as the highly successful video game Grand Theft Auto V on the game's radio station, Rebel Radio. A brief bit of "Can't Hardly Stand It" was also featured in the 2013 film Only Lovers Left Alive.

Charlie Feathers' pioneering contribution to the genre has been recognized by the Rockabilly Hall of Fame. Bob Dylan has featured Charlie Feathers on the second season of his XM satellite radio show Theme Time Radio Hour, playing Feathers' records "One Hand Loose" (on the "Countdown" show, Dec. 12, 2007) and "Defrost Your Heart" (on the "Cold" show, April 2, 2008).

Feathers is an inductee in the Mississippi Musicians Hall of Fame.

== Discography ==
=== Albums ===
- Good Rockin' Tonight (recorded in 1973, released in 1974)
- Live In Memphis, Tennessee (recorded in 1973, released in 1976)
- That Rock-A-Billy Cat! (recorded 1968, released 1979)
- Charlie Feathers, Vol. 1: Rockabilly (1979)
- Charlie Feathers, Vol. 2 (1979)
- Rockabilly Rhythm! (recorded 1973, released 1981)
- Original T.V. Sound Track N.B.C. 1979 – (Rock-A-Billy) We're Getting Closer (1981)
- New Jungle Fever (1987)
- Honky Tonk Man (1988)
- Charlie Feathers (American Explorer Series) (Elektra Nonesuch, 1991)
- I Ain't Done Yet (1993)
- Tip Top Daddy (demos recorded 1958–1973, released 1995)
- The King of Rockabilly: This Little Show (1999) reissue of Original T.V. Sound Track N.B.C.
- Live in London (recorded 1990, released 2000)
- Live in Paris '87 (recorded 1987, released 2002)

=== Compilations ===
- Get With It: Essential Recordings (1954–1969) (early singles and unreleased tracks, 1998) 2-CD
- Wild Side of Life (rare and unreleased tracks, 2008)
- Honky Tonk Kind (rare and unreleased tracks, 2008)
- Long Time Ago (rare and unreleased tracks, 2008)
- Jungle Fever (1955–1962 Recordings) (2016)
- Charlie Feathers: Rocks (2023)

=== Singles ===
- Flip 503 - "Peepin' Eyes" / "I've Been Deceived" (April 1955)
- Sun 231 - "Defrost Your Heart" / "A Wedding Gown of White" (December 1955)
- Meteor 5032 - "Tongue-Tied Jill" / "Get With It" (June 1956) with Jody Chastain (bass) and Jerry Huffman (lead guitar)
- King 4971 - "Can't Hardly Stand It" / "Everybody's Lovin' My Baby" (October 1956) with Jody Chastain and Jerry Huffman
- King 4997 - "One Hand Loose" / "Bottle to the Baby" (December 1956) with Jody Chastain and Jerry Huffman
- King 5022 - "When You Decide" / "Nobody's Woman" (March 1957) with Jody Chastain and Jerry Huffman
- King 5043 - "Too Much Alike" / "When You Come Around" (April 1957) with Jody Chastain and Jerry Huffman
- Kay 1001 - "Jungle Fever" / "Why Don't You" (June 1958)
- Wal-May 101 - "Dinky John" / "South of Chicago" (as "Charlie Morgan") (July 1960)
- Memphis 103 - "Today and Tomorrow" / "Wild Wild Party" (October 1961)
- Holiday Inn 114 - "Deep Elm Blues" / "Nobody's Darling" (April 1963)
- Philwood P-223 - "Tear It Up" / "Stutterin' Cindy" (1968) with Marcus Van Story (slappin' bass)
- Pompadour 231 - "Uh Huh Honey" / "A Wedding Gown of White" [re-recording] (1973)
- Rollin' Rock 45-025 - "That Certain Female" / "She Set Me Free" (1974)
- Vetco 921 - "Will You Be Satisfied That Way" / "It's Just That Song" (1976)
- Vetco 922 - "We're Getting Closer to Being Apart" / "You Make It Look So Easy" (1976)
- Feathers 1 (791104) - "Blue Suede Shoes" / "We're Getting Closer to Being Apart" [re-recording] (1979)
- Feathers 2 (791105) - "Ooby Dooby" / "If You Were Mine to Lose" (1979)
- Feathers 3 (800851) - "Cold Dark Night" / "Blame It on Time" (1980)
- Feathers 4 (800850) - "Today I Started Loving You Again" / "Folsom Prison Blues" (1980)
- Feathers 5 - "Jungle Fever" [re-recording] / "Jewel Here on Earth" (1981)
- Feathers 6 - "He'll Have to Go" / "Will the Circle Be Unbroken" (1981)
- Feathers 7 - "Honky Tonk Man" / "That's Alright (Mama)" (1981)
- Feathers 8 - "Roll Over Beethoven" / "Swinging Doors" (1981)
- Feathers 9 - "In the Pines" / "I Must Move On" (1981)
- Feathers 10 - "One Black Rat" / "Dig Myself a Hole" (1982)
- Feathers 11 - "Lonesome Whistle" / "Cockroach" (1982)
- Feathers 12 - "What Da Say" / "Roll Over Beethoven No. 2" (1982)
- Feathers 13 - "Working on a Building" / "You Believe Everyone but Me" (1983)

Note: the Feathers 45s were private releases, sold at Charlie Feathers concerts.
