= Gothabilly =

Music genre

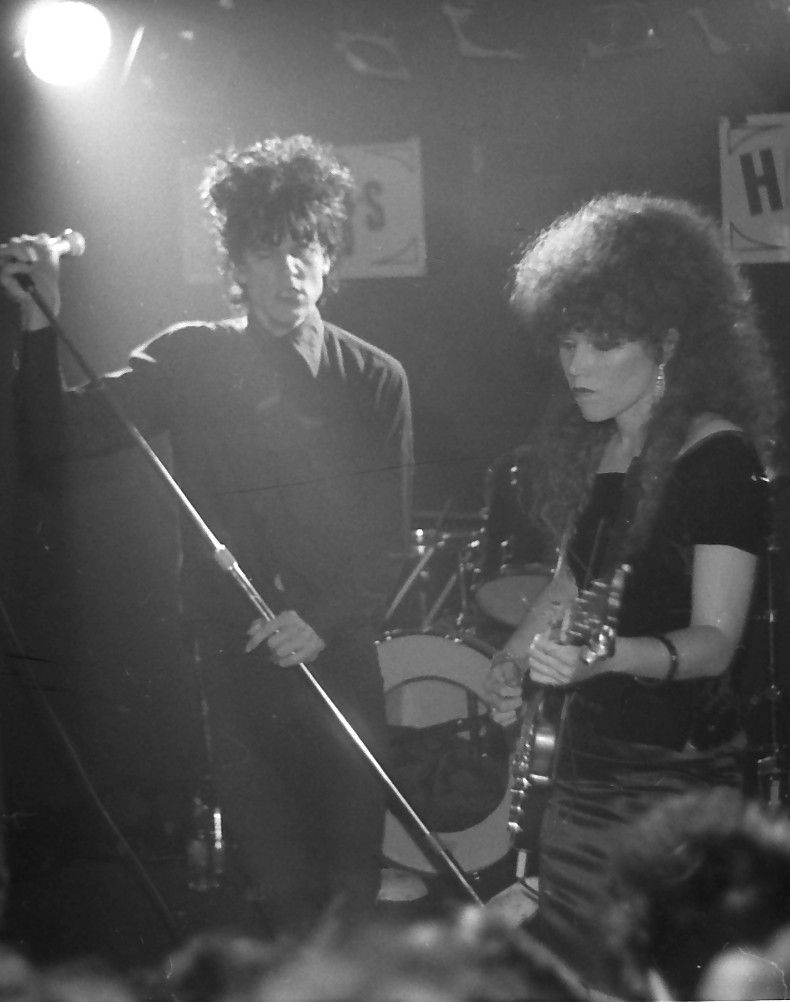
- The Cramps in 1982
- Other names: Hellbilly
- Stylistic origins: Rockabilly; gothic rock
- Cultural origins: Late 1970s, United States

Regional scenes
- Mainly the United States and England but growing in popularity in many Scandinavian countries.

Other topics
- Gothic country; psychobilly

Gothabilly (sometimes hellbilly) is music genre influenced by rockabilly and the goth subculture. The name is a portmanteau word that combines gothic and rockabilly, first used by the Cramps in the late 1970s to describe their somber blend of rockabilly and punk rock. Since then, the term has come to describe a fashion style influenced by gothic fashion, as seen in its use of black silks, satins, lace and velvet, corsets, top hats, antique jewellery, PVC and leather.

== Characteristics ==
Gothabilly is distinctly different in sound from psychobilly. While psychobilly fuses 1950s rockabilly with 1970s punk rock in a faster, more aggressive sound, gothabilly fuses bluesy rockabilly with gothic piano and guitar, and is defined by having slower tempos and emphasizing mood over aggression.

== History ==
The Cramps have been credited with coining the term "gothabilly". The term was not popularized until the release of a series of international gothabilly compilation albums released by Skully Records in the mid-1990s.

Gothabilly is particularly active in the western portion of the United States, with many of today's bands originating in California.
