= The Cramps =

American rock band (1976–2009)

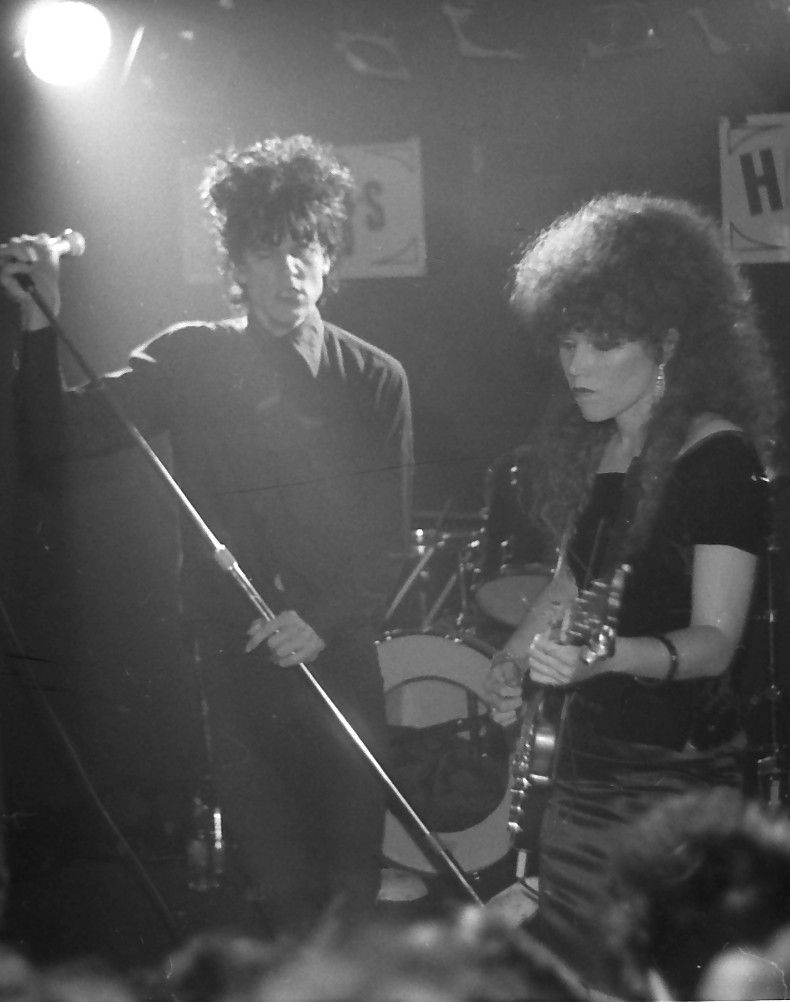
- The Cramps in 1982. From left: Lux Interior and Poison Ivy

Background information
- Origin: New York City, U.S.
- Genres: Psychobilly; punk rock; gothabilly; surf
- Years active: 1976–2009
- Labels: Illegal; I.R.S.; Big Beat; Enigma; The Medicine Label; Epitaph; Vengeance
- Past members: Lux Interior; Poison Ivy; Nick Knox; Bryan Gregory; Kid Congo Powers; Candy del Mar; Slim Chance; Harry Drumdini; See members section for others

The Cramps were an American rock band formed in 1976 and active until 2009. Their lineup rotated frequently during their existence, with the duo of singer Lux Interior and guitarist Poison Ivy the only ever-present members. The band is credited as progenitors of the psychobilly subgenre, fusing elements of punk rock with rockabilly. The addition of guitarist Bryan Gregory and drummer Pam Balam resulted in the first complete lineup in April 1976. They released their debut album Songs the Lord Taught Us in 1980. The band split after the death of lead singer Interior in 2009.

== History ==
=== 1970s ===
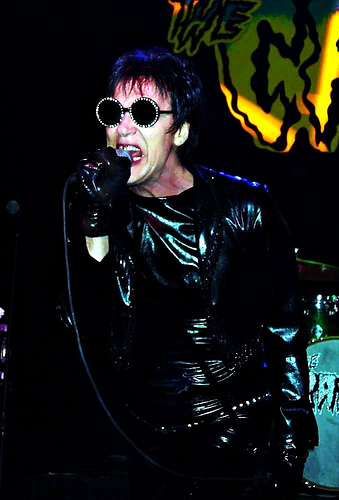
Lux Interior in 2004

Lux Interior (born Erick Lee Purkhiser) and Poison Ivy (born Kristy Marlana Wallace) met in Sacramento, California, in 1972. In light of their common artistic interests and shared devotion to record collecting, they decided to form the Cramps. Lux took his stage name from a car ad, and Ivy claimed to have received hers in a dream (she was first Poison Ivy Rorschach, taking her last name from that of the inventor of the Rorschach test). In 1973, they moved to Akron, Ohio, and then to New York in 1975, soon entering into CBGB's early punk scene with other emerging acts like Suicide, the Ramones, Patti Smith, Television, Blondie, Talking Heads, Mink DeVille, and fellow Ohio transplants Dead Boys. The lineup in 1976 was Poison Ivy Rorschach, Lux Interior, Bryan Gregory (guitar), and his sister Pam "Balam" (drums).

In a short period, the Cramps changed drummers twice; Miriam Linna (later of Nervus Rex, the Zantees, and the A-Bones and co-owner of Norton Records) replaced Pam Balam, and Nick Knox (formerly with the Electric Eels) replaced Linna in September 1977. In the late 1970s, the Cramps briefly shared a rehearsal space with the Fleshtones, and performed regularly in New York at clubs such as CBGB and Max's Kansas City, releasing two independent singles produced by Alex Chilton at Ardent Studios in Memphis in 1977 before being signed by Miles Copeland III to the young I.R.S. Records label. Their first tour of Great Britain was as supporting act to the Police on that band's first UK tour promoting Outlandos d'Amour.

In June 1978, they gave a landmark free concert for patients at the California State Mental Hospital in Napa, recorded on a Sony Portapak video camera by the San Francisco collective Target Video and later released as Live at Napa State Mental Hospital. Once back to the east coast, they played the revamped 1940s swing club "The Meadowbrook" in New Jersey, which had a huge stage and dance floor. Next they recorded two singles in New York City, which were later re-released on their 1979 Gravest Hits EP, before Chilton brought them back that year to Memphis to record their first album, Songs the Lord Taught Us, at Phillips Recording, operated by former Sun Records label owner Sam Phillips.

=== 1980s ===
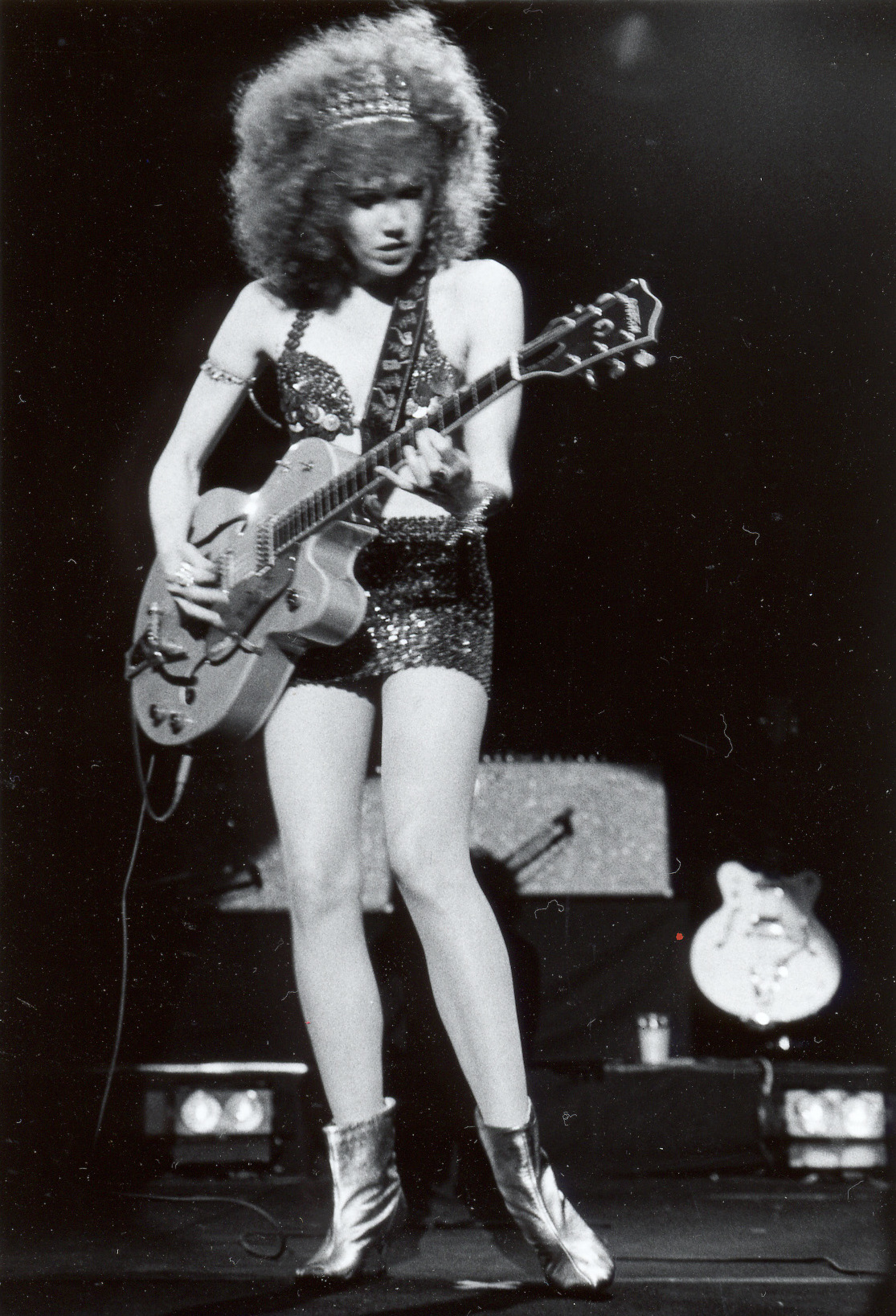
Poison Ivy performing with the Cramps in Tokyo, 1990

The Cramps relocated to Los Angeles in 1980 and hired guitarist Kid Congo Powers of the Gun Club. While recording their second LP, Psychedelic Jungle, the band and Miles Copeland began to dispute royalties and creative rights. The ensuing court case prevented them from releasing anything until 1983, when they recorded Smell of Female live at New York's Peppermint Lounge; Kid Congo Powers subsequently departed. Mike Metoff of the Pagans (cousin of Nick Knox) was the final second guitarist – albeit only live – of the Cramps' pre-bass era. He accompanied them on an extensive European tour in 1984 (that had been canceled twice because they could not find a suitable guitarist) which included four sold out nights at the Hammersmith Palais. They also recorded performances of "Thee Most Exalted Potentate of Love" and "You Got Good Taste" which were broadcast on A Midsummer Night's Tube (1984). Smell of Female peaked at No. 74 in the UK Albums Chart.

The band appears in the 1982 film Urgh! A Music War.

In 1985 the Cramps recorded a one-off track for the horror movie The Return of the Living Dead called "Surfin' Dead", on which Ivy played bass as well as guitar. With the release of 1986's A Date With Elvis, the Cramps permanently added a bass guitar to the mix, but had trouble finding a suitable player, so Ivy temporarily filled in as the band's bassist. Jennifer "Fur" Dixon joined them on the world tour to promote the album. Their popularity in the UK was at its peak as evidenced by the six nights at Hammersmith in London, three at the Odeon (as well as many other sell out dates throughout the UK) and then three at the Palais when they returned from the continent. Each night of the tour opened with the band coming on one at a time each: Knox, Fur, Ivy and then Lux before launching into their take on Elvis Presley's "Heartbreak Hotel". The album featured what was to become a predominating theme of their work from here on: a move away from the B-movie horror focus to an increased emphasis on sexual double entendre. The album met with differing fates on either side of the Atlantic: in Europe, it sold over 250,000 copies, while in the U.S. the band had difficulty finding a record company prepared to release it until 1990. It also included their first UK Singles Chart hit: "Can Your Pussy Do the Dog?"

It was not until 1986 that the Cramps found a suitable permanent bass player: Candy del Mar (of Satan's Cheerleaders), who made her recorded debut on the raw live album RockinnReelininAucklandNewZealandxxx. This was followed by the studio album Stay Sick! in 1990, which spent one week at No. 62 in the UK Albums Chart in February of that year.

=== 1990s ===
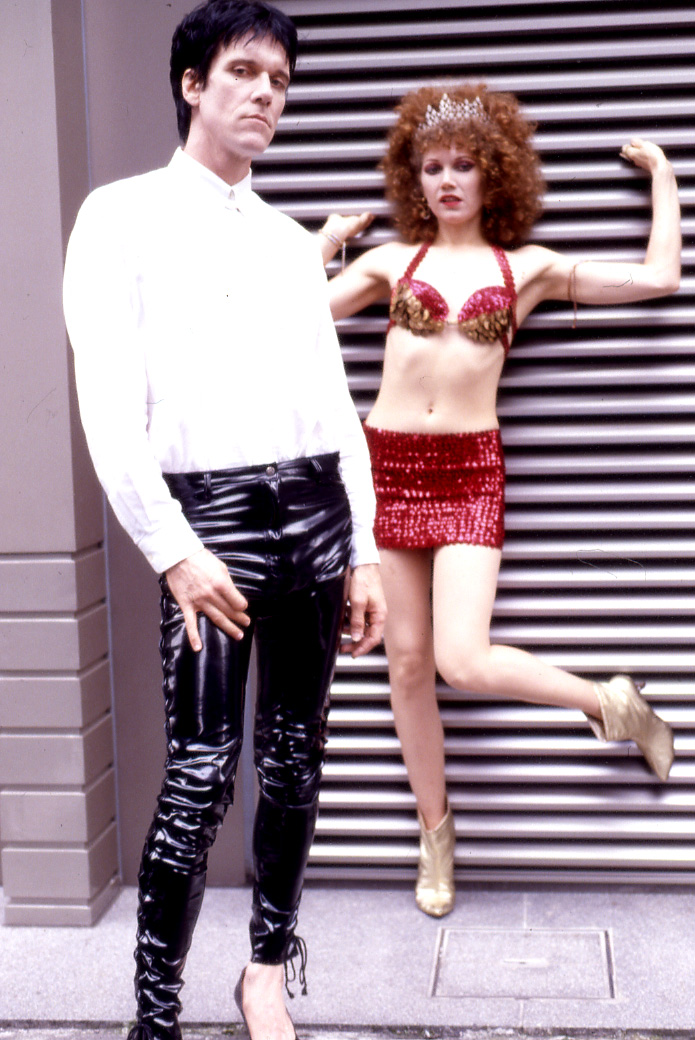
Lux Interior and Poison Ivy in Tokyo, 1990

Candy del Mar and Knox left the band in 1991. The Cramps hit the Top 40 in the UK for the first and only time with "Bikini Girls with Machine Guns"; Ivy posed as such both on the cover of the single and in the promotional video for the song. The Cramps went on to record more albums and singles through the 1990s and 2000s, for various labels. When the band signed to The Medicine Label, a Warner Brothers imprint, in 1994 – the label made the announcement via a limited edition (500 copies) 12" live album of the Cramps' first two Max's Kansas City shows, given away to all ticket holders as they exited a secret CBGB show in early January of that year.

In 1994, the Cramps made their national US television debut on Late Night with Conan O'Brien performing "Ultra Twist".

In 1995 the Cramps appeared on the TV-series Beverly Hills, 90210 in the Halloween episode "Gypsies, Cramps and Fleas". They played two songs in the episode: "Mean Machine" and "Strange Love". Lux Interior started the song by saying "Hey boys and ghouls, are you ready to raise the dead?".

In honor of the success of the Cramps, the Rock and Roll Hall of Fame has on display a shattered bass drum head that Lux's head went through during a live show.

=== 2000s ===
On January 10, 2001, Bryan Gregory died at Anaheim Memorial Medical Center of complications following a heart attack. He was 49.

In 2002, the Cramps released their final album, Fiends of Dope Island, on their own label, Vengeance Records. That same year, Lux Interior did a voiceover for the lead singer character of the band The Bird Brains on the animated TV show SpongeBob SquarePants singing 'Underwater Sun.' The song was written and composed by Stephen Hillenburg and Peter Strauss.

The Cramps played their final shows in Europe in the summer of 2006 and their last live show was on November 4, 2006, at the Marquee Theater in Tempe, Arizona.

On February 4, 2009, Lux Interior died at the Glendale Memorial Hospital after suffering an aortic dissection which, contrary to initial reports about a pre-existing condition, was "sudden, shocking and unexpected".

=== 2020s ===
In August 2026, after resurrecting Vengeance Records label, Poison Ivy, along with Henry Rollins and Ian MacKaye, released Gravest Gravy, a collection of songs recorded by the band with Alex Chilton in 1977.

== Style and influences ==
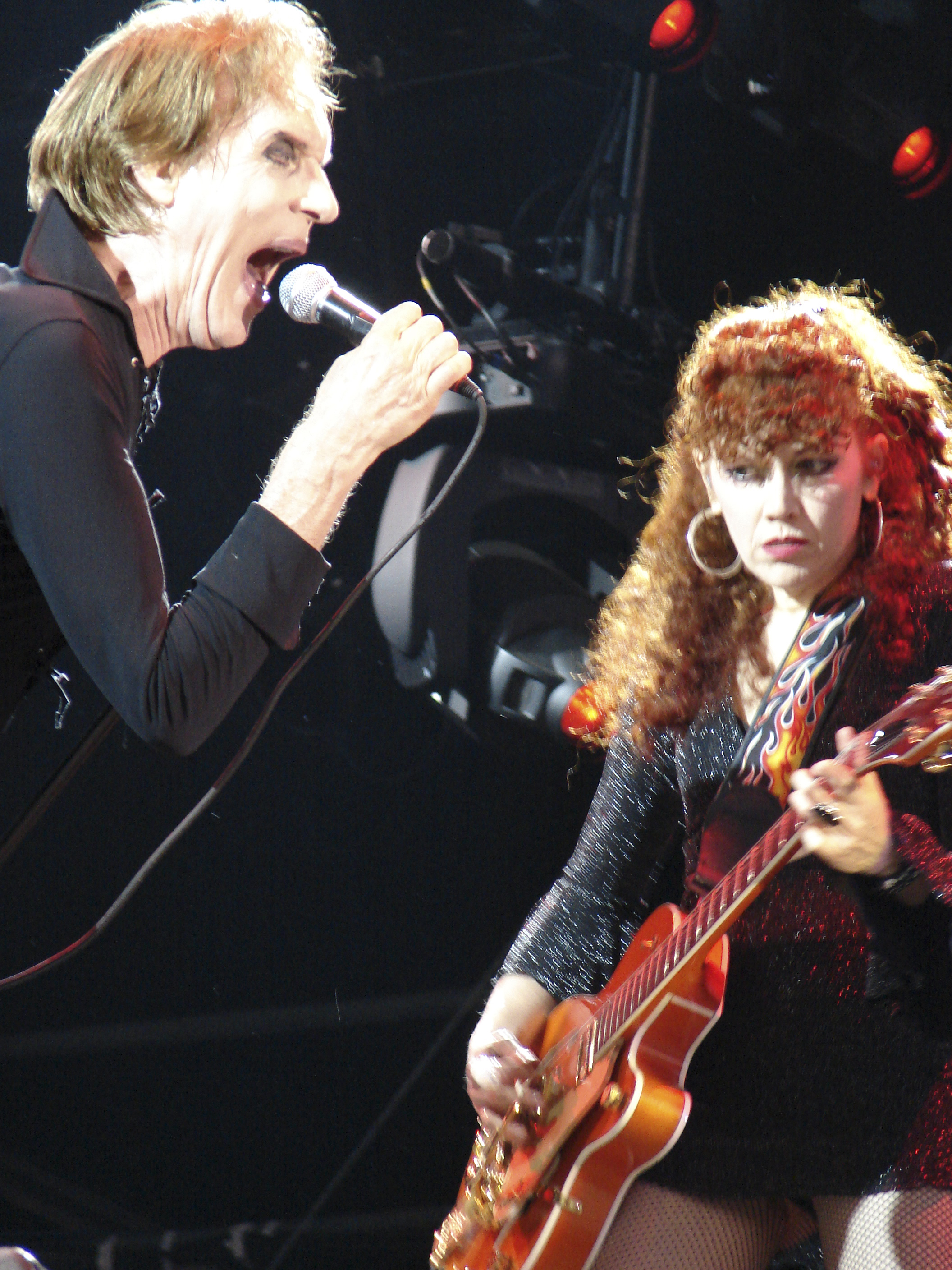
The Cramps in 2006.

The Cramps weren't thinking of this weird subgenre when we coined the term "psychobilly" in 1976 to describe what we were doing. To us all the '50s rockabillies were psycho to begin with; it just came with the turf as a given, like a crazed, sped-up hillbilly boogie version of country.

We hadn't meant playing everything superloud at superheavy hardcore punk tempos with a whole style and look, which is what "psychobilly" came to mean later in the '80s. We also used the term "rockabilly voodoo" on our early flyers.

— Poison Ivy Rorschach

The Cramps' music is played at varying tempos, with a minimal drumkit. An integral part of the early Cramps sound was dual guitars, without a bassist. The focus of their songs' lyrical content and their image was camp humor, sexual double-entendre, and retro horror/sci-fi b-movie iconography. Their sound was heavily influenced by early rockabilly, such as Jerry Lott AKA The Phantom, whose 1958 single 'Love Me' they covered, rhythm and blues, and rock and roll like Link Wray and Hasil Adkins, 1960s surf music acts such as the Ventures and Dick Dale, 1960s garage rock artists like the Standells, the Trashmen, the Green Fuz and the Sonics, as well as the post-glam/early punk scene from which they emerged, as well as citing Ricky Nelson as being an influence during numerous interviews. They also were influenced by the Ramones and Screamin' Jay Hawkins. Poison Ivy stated, "The failure of outsiders to acknowledge the influence of blues and R&B on The Cramps is an omission bordering on racism. Rockabilly is rooted in the blues and we consider ourselves a blues band."

The band used the phrases gothabilly, psychobilly and "rockabilly voodoo" to market their music. The term "psychobilly" was first used in the lyrics to the country song "One Piece at a Time", written by Wayne Kemp for Johnny Cash, which was a Top 10 hit in the United States in 1976. The lyrics describe the construction of a "psychobilly Cadillac using stolen auto parts." The Cramps have since rejected the idea of being a part of a psychobilly subculture, noting that "We weren't even describing the music when we put 'psychobilly' on our old fliers; we were just using carny terms to drum up business. It wasn't meant as a style of music." Nevertheless, The Cramps, along with artists such as Screamin' Jay Hawkins, are considered important precursors to psychobilly. Critics and journalists classified the Cramps' sound as psychobilly, gothabilly, garage punk, rockabilly, horror punk, garage rock, punk rock and surf.

The Cramps have been cited as an influence by musicians including 45 Grave, the Nomads, Zombina and the Skeletones, Inca Babies, Creeper, the Black Keys, the White Stripes, the Sisters of Mercy, My Bloody Valentine, Faith No More and Southern Culture on the Skids.

== Members ==
Final lineup

- Lux Interior (Erick Purkhiser) – vocals, harmonica, percussion (1976–2009; until his death)
- Poison Ivy (Kristy Wallace) – guitar, theremin, bass (1976–2009)
- Harry Drumdini (Harry Meisenheimer) – drums (1993–2003, 2006–2009)

== Discography ==
=== Studio albums ===
- Songs the Lord Taught Us (1980, Illegal)
- Psychedelic Jungle (1981, I.R.S.)
- A Date with Elvis (1986, Big Beat)
- Stay Sick! (1990, Enigma)
- Look Mom No Head! (1991, Enigma)
- Flamejob (1994, The Medicine Label)
- Big Beat from Badsville (1997, Epitaph)
- Fiends of Dope Island (2003, Vengeance)
- Gravest Gravy (2026, Vengeance)
