= Nick Knox =

American drummer

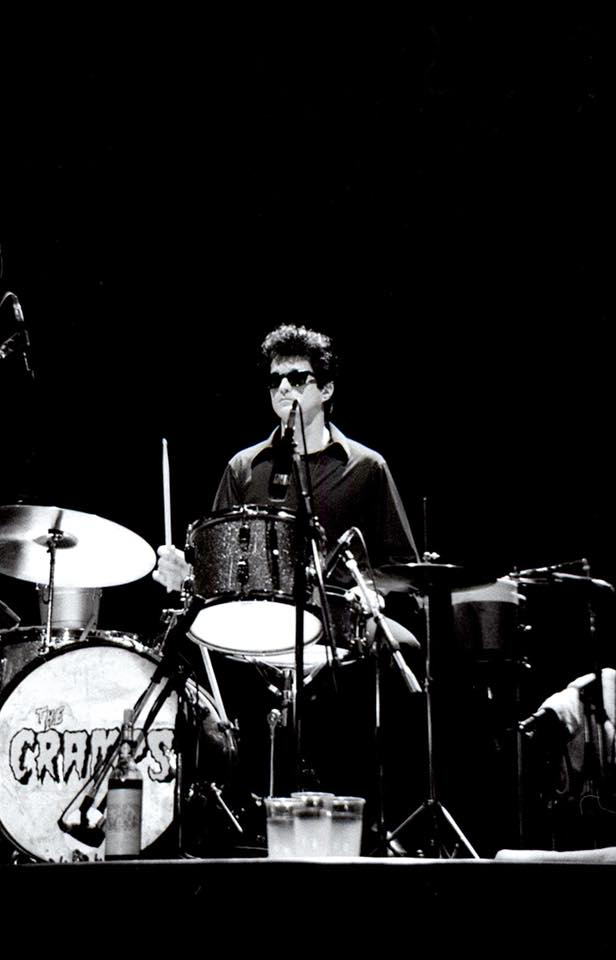
Knox in 1990.

Nick Knox (born Nicholas George Stephanoff; March 26, 1953 – June 14, 2018) was an American drummer for the psychobilly band The Cramps. He replaced Miriam Linna in 1977 and left in 1991. Knox was with The Cramps during the peak of their worldwide popularity when they toured Europe extensively in 1986 with the A Date with Elvis tour. He drafted in his cousin, Mike Metoff (aka Ike Knox, ex The Pagans) during the preceding European tour in 1984. Knox was recognised as the drummer who brought a tightness to the Cramps sound, and stayed longer than any other drummer in the band. Before joining the Cramps, he was a member of protopunk band The Electric Eels.

Later Knox was the "senior advisor" to the Cleveland-based punk band Archie and the Bunkers, and worked closely with the band on their 2017 single on Norton Records.

Knox died of cardiogenic shock on June 15, 2018.
