= Poison Ivy (musician) =

American guitarist

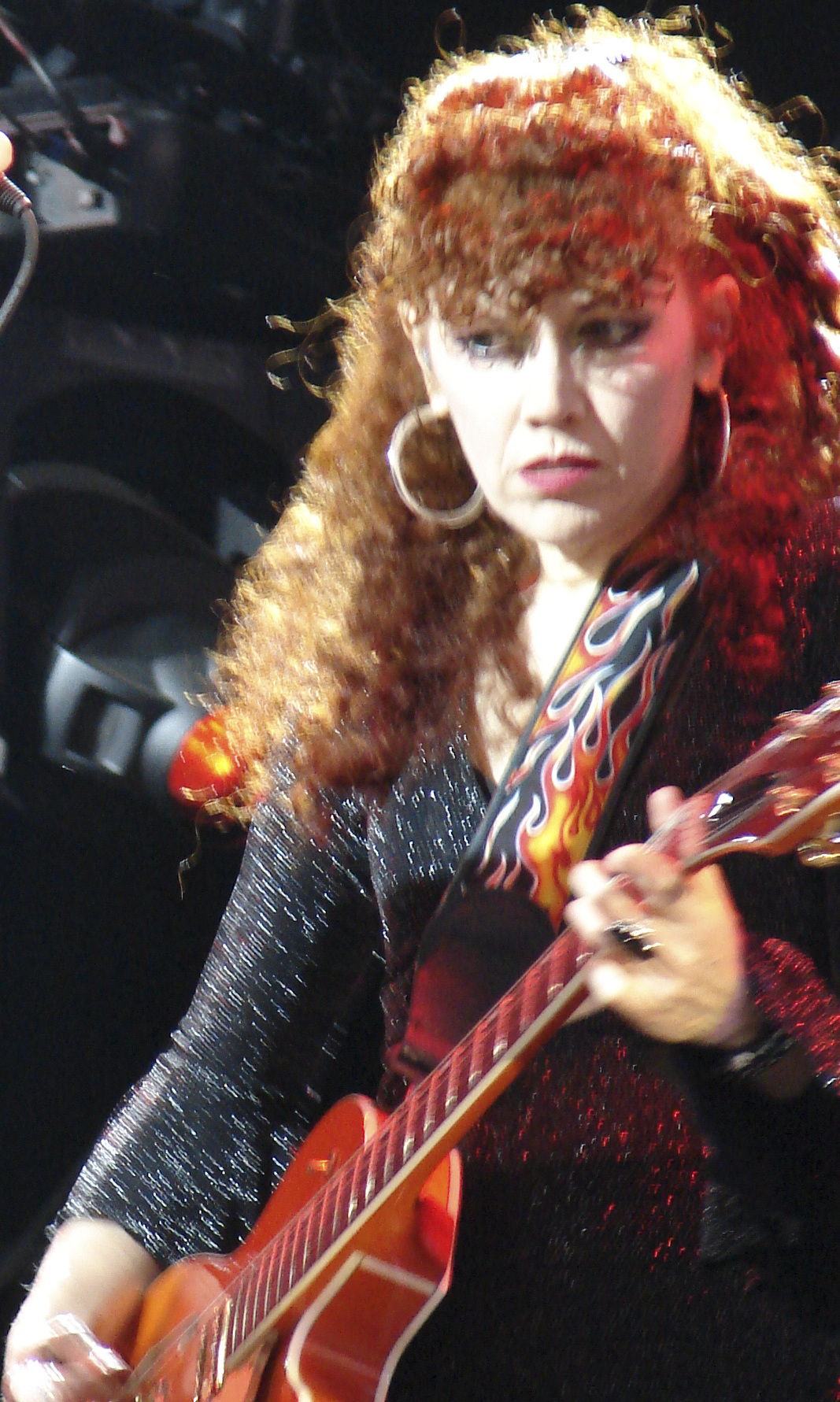
- Poison Ivy performing in 2006

Background information
- Also known as: Poison Ivy, Poison Ivy Rorschach
- Born: Kristy Marlana Wallace; February 20, 1953 (age 73); San Bernardino, California, U.S.
- Genres: Psychobilly; gothabilly; punk rock
- Instruments: Guitar; bass; theremin; vocals
- Years active: 1976–2009

Kristy Marlana Wallace (born February 20, 1953), known as Poison Ivy or Poison Ivy Rorschach, is an American guitarist, songwriter, arranger, producer, and occasional vocalist who co-founded the rock band the Cramps.

== Early life ==
Ivy was born as Kristy Wallace in San Bernardino, California, and raised near Sacramento. In 1972, while attending Sacramento State College, Wallace met future Cramps singer Lux Interior.

== Career ==
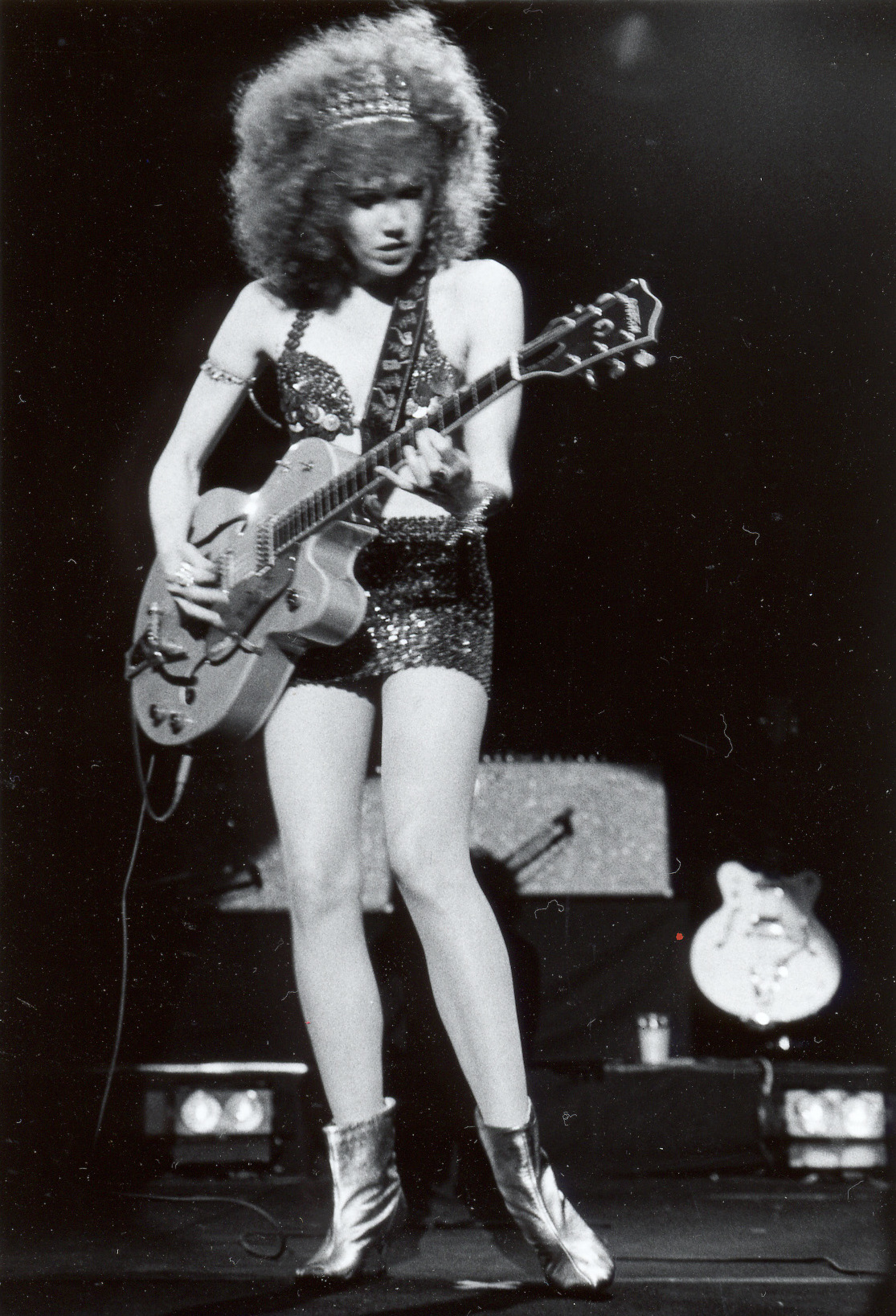
Poison Ivy performing in 1990 in Tokyo.

In 1974, they moved first to Interior's hometown of Akron, Ohio, and then to New York City. In 1976, as part of the emerging punk rock scene, they began performing as the Cramps. They quickly gained a reputation for their unusual, rockabilly-inspired music and wild live performances. The Cramps, with Ivy, Lux, and various other guitarists, drummers, and bassists, continued to release records and perform live until the fall of 2006, enjoying some commercial success (mainly in Europe) and acquiring a strong cult following worldwide.

Throughout the Cramps' career Ivy co-wrote all of the group's original songs with Lux Interior, and provided the arrangements for songs they covered. She produced or co-produced several of their albums and singles, sang on the songs "Kizmiaz" and "Get Off the Road," and played theremin on later records.

Songs written by Ivy and Interior and performed by other artists include:

- "Human Fly" (based on "Do the Fly" by Ray Gentry/Rovin' Gamblers [1961], modified by the Cramps in 1978, without credit to the original) recorded by Sinful Lilly, Crestfallen, the Dead Brothers, Nouvelle Vague, Supernaut, Hanni El Khatib, and Los Esquizitos
- "New Kind of Kick" (The Jesus and Mary Chain, the Drones, Muse, Tinfed)
- "Thee Most Exalted Potentate of Love" (Queens of the Stone Age).

== Guitars ==
Early on, Ivy used a clear plexiglass Dan Armstrong guitar, then the unusual Canadian-made Bill Lewis guitar heard on the first few Cramps recordings. From 1985 forward, she mostly used a 1958 Gretsch 6120 hollow-body. She used Fender Pro Reverb amplifiers onstage, and smaller Valco and Allen amps in the studio.. Poison Ivy uses few effects pedals. She mainly uses a Univox U-1095 Super-Fuzz pedal, a Fulltone Supa-Trem ST-1, a Boss TR-2 and a Maxon AD80.

== Personal life ==
Ivy and Lux were married for 37 years, until his death on February 4, 2009. She lives in Glendale, California.
