= Lux Interior =

American singer

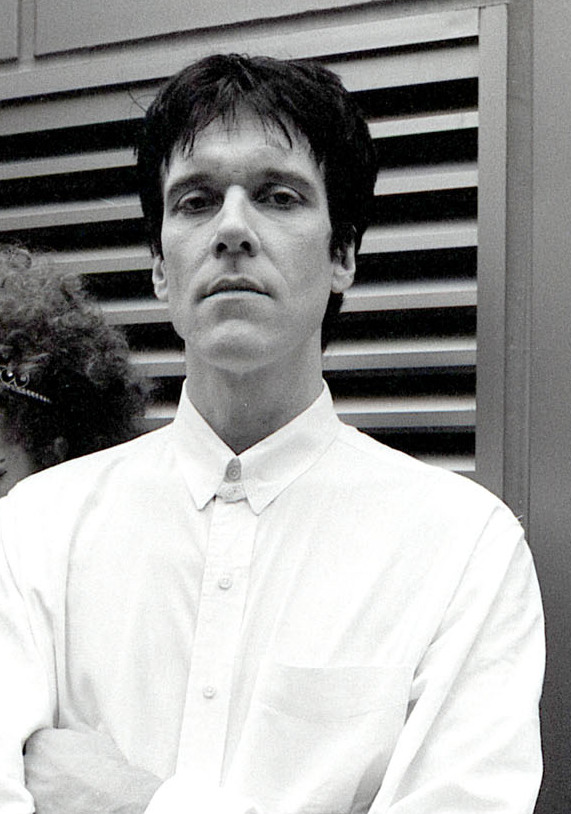
- Lux Interior in 1990

Background information
- Also known as: Lux Interior, Raven Beauty, Vip Vop
- Born: Erick Lee Purkhiser; October 21, 1946; Akron, Ohio, U.S.
- Died: February 4, 2009 (aged 62) Glendale, California, U.S.
- Genres: Psychobilly; gothabilly
- Instruments: Vocals; harmonica; percussion
- Years active: 1972–2009
- Label: Vengeance
- Formerly of: The Cramps
- Website: www.thecramps.com

Signature
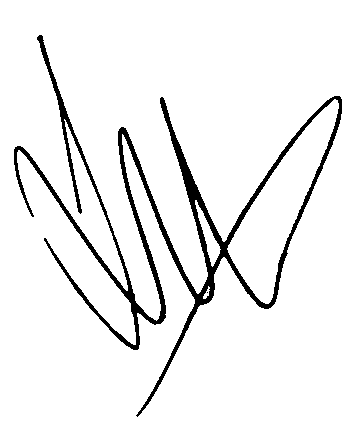

Erick Lee Purkhiser (October 21, 1946 – February 4, 2009), better known by the stage name Lux Interior, was an American singer-songwriter and a founding member of the American rock band the Cramps from 1976 until his death in 2009 at age 62.

== Early life ==
Born in Akron, Ohio, he grew up in its nearby suburb of Stow and graduated from Stow High School.

== Career ==
He met his partner Kristy Wallace, better known as Poison Ivy, in Sacramento in 1972, when he and a friend picked her up while she was hitchhiking. The couple founded the band after they moved from California to Ohio in 1973, and then to New York in 1975, where they soon became part of the flourishing punk scene.

== Style ==
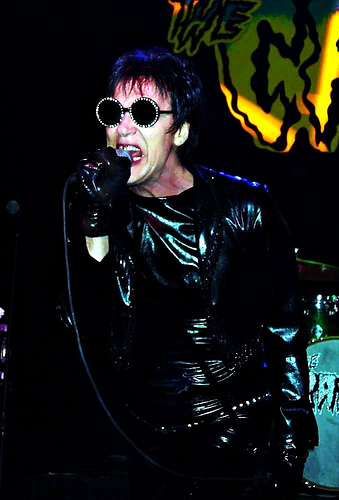
Lux Interior performing in 2004.

Lux Interior's name came "from an old car commercial", after he previously flirted with the names Vip Vop and Raven Beauty, while his wife's name change was inspired by "a vision she received in a dream". The couple called their musical style psychobilly, a word that appears in the lyrics of Johnny Cash's song, "One Piece at a Time", and gothabilly. The band later said that they were just using the phrases as "carny terms to drum up business."

Interior was known for a frenetic and provocative stage show that included high heels, near-nudity and sexually suggestive movements. His speciality was the microphone blow job, where he could get the entire head of an SM-58 microphone into his mouth. The Cramps gave their last show in November 2006.

When asked why he continued to play live well into middle age, he told the LA Times:

It's a little bit like asking a junkie how he's been able to keep on dope all these years--it's just so much fun. You pull into one town and people scream, 'I love you, I love you, I love you.' And you go to a bar and have a great rock 'n' roll show and go to the next town and people scream, 'I love you, I love you, I love you, I love you.' It's hard to walk away from all that.

In 2002, Lux Interior voiced a character on the SpongeBob SquarePants episode "Party Pooper Pants" – the lead singer of an all-bird rock band called the Bird Brains, performing "Underwater Sun", written and composed by Stephen Hillenburg and Peter Strauss. Tom Kenny, who voices SpongeBob, attended his memorial ceremony in 2009.

Interior was also a painter (mainly in his college years) and visual artist. In particular he was a 3D camera collector and enthusiast who used his collection to create artworks and collages.

== Death ==
Lux Interior died at 4:30 a.m. on February 4, 2009, at Glendale Memorial Hospital in California. The cause of death was aortic dissection. He was survived by his wife Ivy and two brothers, Michael Purkhiser and Ronald "Skip" Purkhiser, as well as a son from a previous marriage. The memorial service for Lux was held on February 21 at the Windmill Chapel of the Self-Realization Fellowship Lake Shrine. Lux's brother Michael also provided insight into his relationship with Lux in a newspaper article.
