= Sinéad O'Connor discography =

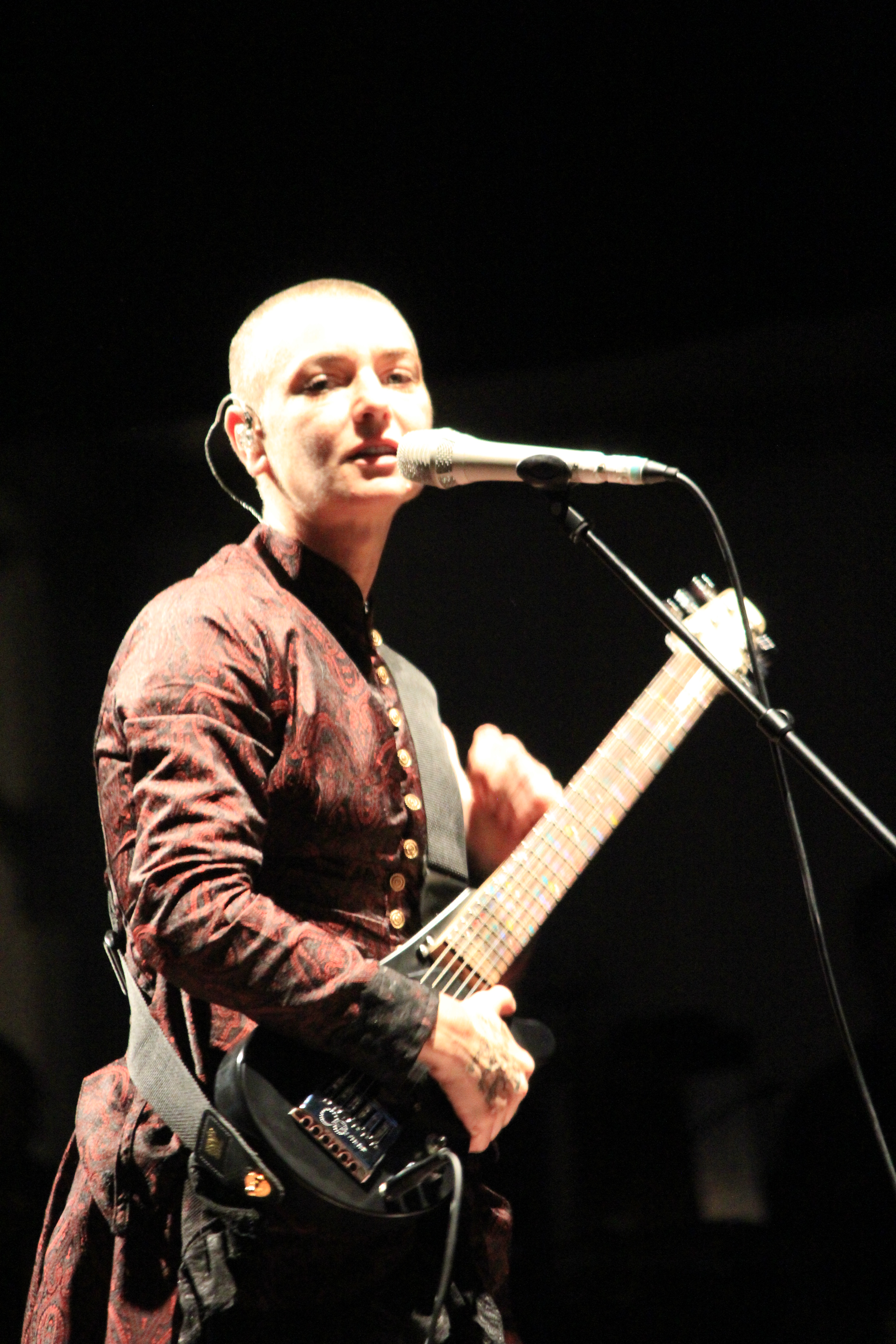
- Sinéad O'Connor performing in 2013
- Studio albums: 10
- Extended plays: 1
- Live albums: 1
- Compilation albums: 5
- Singles: 54
- Video albums: 4
- Music videos: 32
- Other appearances: 97

Irish singer Sinéad O'Connor released 10 studio albums: The Lion and the Cobra (1987), I Do Not Want What I Haven't Got (1990), Am I Not Your Girl? (1992), Universal Mother (1994), Faith and Courage (2000), Sean-Nós Nua (2002), Throw Down Your Arms (2005), Theology (2007), How About I Be Me (and You Be You)? (2012), and I'm Not Bossy, I'm the Boss (2014).

The extended play Gospel Oak (1997) and live album Live at the Sugar Club (2008) were also issued, and O'Connor's compilations consist of five sets—So Far... The Best Of (1997), Sinéad O'Connor: Best Of (2000), She Who Dwells in the Secret Place of the Most High Shall Abide Under the Shadow of the Almighty (2003), Collaborations (2005) and Essential (2005). In addition, O'Connor also released four video albums, and 33 singles as lead artist.

== Albums ==
=== Studio albums ===
Title	Album details	Peak chart positions											Certifications
Title	Album details	AUS	AUT	CAN	FRA	GER	IRL	NZL	SWE	SWI	UK	US	Certifications
The Lion and the Cobra	Released: 5 October 1987; Label: Ensign/Chrysalis; Formats: LP, CD, CS	37	—	17	—	52	3	4	37	12	27	36	BPI: Gold; MC: Platinum; RIAA: Gold
I Do Not Want What I Haven't Got	Released: 12 March 1990; Re-released: 21 April 2009; Label: Ensign/Chrysalis; Formats: LP, CD, CS	1	1	1	4	1	1	1	1	1	1	1	BPI: 2× Platinum; ARIA: Platinum; BVMI: Platinum; IFPI SWI: Gold; MC: 5× Platinum; RIAA: 2× Platinum; SNEP: Platinum
Am I Not Your Girl?	Released: 14 September 1992; Label: Ensign/Chrysalis; Formats: LP, CD, CS	17	9	11	26	24	8	5	16	11	6	27	BPI: Gold; IFPI SWI: Gold
Universal Mother	Released: 12 September 1994; Label: Ensign, Chrysalis; Formats: LP, CD, CS	31	7	16	21	38	5	38	11	11	19	36	BPI: Gold; IFPI AUT: Gold; MC: Gold
Faith and Courage	Released: 13 June 2000; Label: Atlantic; Formats: CD, CS	18	21	18	27	38	8	33	59	19	61	55	ARIA: Gold
Sean-Nós Nua	Released: 8 October 2002; Re-released: 8 April 2013; Label: Vanguard; Formats: CD CS	61	29	—	69	75	3	—	—	67	52	139	
Throw Down Your Arms	Released: 4 October 2005; Label: Chocolate and Vanilla; Formats: LP, CD, download	200	—	—	26	—	17	—	—	—	189	—	IRMA: Gold
Theology	Released: 18 June 2007; Label: Koch/Rubyworks; Formats: CD, download	124	—	—	81	86	18	—	—	—	157	168	
How About I Be Me (and You Be You)?	Released: 21 February 2012; Label: One Little Indian/RED; Formats: LP, CD, download	198	42	71	105	78	5	—	56	69	33	115	
I'm Not Bossy, I'm the Boss	Released: 11 August 2014; Label: Nettwerk; Formats: LP, CD, download	191	44	—	132	39	1	21	—	48	22	83	
"—" denotes a recording that did not chart or was not released in that territory.

=== Compilation albums ===
Title	Album details	Peak chart positions								Certifications
Title	Album details	AUS	AUT	FRA	GER	IRL	NZL	SWI	UK	Certifications
So Far... The Best Of	Released: 10 November 1997; Label: Ensign/Chrysalis; Formats: CD, CS	—	27	—	94	3	27	—	28	BPI: Gold
Sinéad O'Connor (Best Of)	Release date: 12 December 2000; Label: Disky; Formats: CD	—	—	—	—	—	—	—	—	
She Who Dwells in the Secret Place of the Most High Shall Abide Under the Shadow of the Almighty	Released: 9 September 2003; Label: Vanguard; Formats: CD, download	101	—	90	—	17	—	—	—	
Collaborations	Released: 21 June 2005; Label: Capitol; Formats: CD	—	61	—	80	22	—	85	183	
Essential	Released: 29 September 2005; Re-released: 2011; Label: EMI; Formats: CD	—	—	—	—	—	—	—	—	
"—" denotes a recording that did not chart or was not released in that territory.

=== Live albums ===
Title	Album details
Live at the Sugar Club	Released: 8 December 2008; Label: Rubyworks; Formats: CD, DVD

== Extended plays ==
Title	EP details	Peak chart positions					
Title	EP details	AUS	AUT	CAN	IRL	UK	US
Gospel Oak	Released: 3 June 1997; Label: Ensign/Chrysalis; Formats: CD	118	49	94	4	28	128
Live in Rotterdam '90	Released: 17 July 2021; Label: Warner; Formats: LP	—	—	—	—	—	—

== Singles ==
=== As lead artist ===
Title	Year	Peak chart positions											Album
Title	Year	AUS	AUT	CAN	GER	IRL	ITA	NLD	NZL	SWI	UK	US	Album
"Troy"	1987	—	—	—	—	—	—	8	—	—	—	—	The Lion and the Cobra
"Mandinka"	1987	39	—	33	—	6	—	24	18	—	17	—	The Lion and the Cobra
"I Want Your (Hands on Me)" (with MC Lyte)	1988	—	—	—	—	—	—	—	40	—	77	—	The Lion and the Cobra
"Jump in the River" (with Karen Finley on the 12")	1988	134	—	—	—	29	—	—	—	—	81	—	(OST) Married to the Mob
"Nothing Compares 2 U"	1990	1	1	1	1	1	1	1	1	1	1	1	I Do Not Want What I Haven't Got
"The Emperor's New Clothes"	1990	20	24	3	28	5	10	22	23	17	31	60	I Do Not Want What I Haven't Got
"Three Babies"	1990	108	—	—	—	19	12	29	—	22	42	—	I Do Not Want What I Haven't Got
"My Special Child"	1991	97	—	96	—	6	—	55	43	18	42	—	Non-album singles
"Silent Night"	1991	—	—	—	—	12	—	71	—	—	60	—	Non-album singles
"Success Has Made a Failure of Our Home"	1992	37	—	62	—	11	13	21	32	28	18	—	Am I Not Your Girl?
"Don't Cry for Me Argentina"	1992	138	—	—	—	—	—	44	—	—	53	—	Am I Not Your Girl?
"You Made Me the Thief of Your Heart" (with Gavin Friday)	1994	43	—	—	—	4	—	—	24	—	42	—	(OST) In the Name of the Father
"Thank You for Hearing Me"	1994	114	—	—	—	—	—	—	—	—	13	—	Universal Mother
"Fire on Babylon"	1994	57	—	61	—	—	—	36	29	—	—	—	Universal Mother
"Famine"/"All Apologies"	1995	134	—	—	—	—	—	—	—	—	51	—	Universal Mother
"This Is to Mother You"	1997	—	—	—	—	—	14	—	—	—	—	—	(EP) Gospel Oak
"This Is a Rebel Song"	1997	—	—	—	—	17	—	—	—	—	60	—	So Far... The Best Of
"No Man's Woman"	2000	87	—	—	—	39	—	80	42	—	—	—	Faith and Courage
"Jealous"	2000	58	—	—	—	—	—	94	—	—	86	—	Faith and Courage
"Troy (The Phoenix from the Flame)"	2002	—	—	—	—	37	—	—	—	—	48	—	Non-album single
"Óró, Sé Do Bheatha 'Bhaile"	2002	—	—	—	—	—	—	—	—	—	—	—	Sean-Nós Nua
"My Lagan Love"	2002	—	—	—	—	—	—	—	—	—	—	—	She Who Dwells in the Secret Place of the Most High; Shall Abide Under the Shadow of the Almighty
"A Hundred Thousand Angels"	2003	—	—	—	—	—	—	—	—	—	—	—	She Who Dwells in the Secret Place of the Most High; Shall Abide Under the Shadow of the Almighty
"Marcus Garvey"	2005	—	—	—	—	48	—	—	—	—	—	—	Throw Down Your Arms
"Throw Down Your Arms"	2005	—	—	—	—	—	—	—	—	—	—	—	Throw Down Your Arms
"I Don't Know How to Love Him"	2007	—	—	—	—	—	—	—	—	—	—	—	Theology
"We People Who Are Darker Than Blue"	2007	—	—	—	—	—	—	—	—	—	—	—	Theology
"The Wolf Is Getting Married"	2012	—	—	—	—	40	—	—	—	—	—	—	How About I Be Me (and You Be You)?
"4th and Vine"	2013	—	—	—	—	84	—	—	—	—	—	—	How About I Be Me (and You Be You)?
"Old Lady"	2013	—	—	—	—	—	—	—	—	—	—	—	How About I Be Me (and You Be You)?
"Take Me to Church"	2014	—	—	—	—	55	—	—	—	—	—	—	I'm Not Bossy, I'm the Boss
"8 Good Reasons"	2014	—	—	—	—	—	—	—	—	—	—	—	I'm Not Bossy, I'm the Boss
"Trouble of the World"	2020	—	—	—	—	—	—	—	—	—	—	—	Non-album single
"—" denotes a recording that did not chart or was not released in that territory.

=== As featured artist ===
Title	Year	Peak chart positions										Album
Title	Year	AUS	AUT	GER	IRL	ITA	NLD	NZL	SWI	UK	US	Album
"Heroine (Theme from Captive)" (with The Edge)	1986	—	—	—	12	—	—	—	—	89	—	Captive (OST)
"Visions of You" (with Jah Wobble)	1991	94	—	—	—	—	—	—	—	35	—	Rising Above Bedlam
"Ship Ahoy" (with Marxman)	1992	—	—	—	—	—	—	—	—	—	—	33 Revolutions per Minute
"Blood of Eden" (with Peter Gabriel)	1992	—	—	—	—	—	—	—	—	43	—	Us
"Don't Give Up" (with Willie Nelson)	1993	121	—	—	—	—	—	—	—	—	—	Across the Borderline
"Be Still" (with Feargal Sharkey, Nanci Griffith and Peter Gabriel)	1993	—	—	—	—	—	—	—	—	—	—	(VA) Peace Together
"Biko" (with Manu Dibango)	1994	—	—	—	—	—	—	—	—	—	—	Wakafrika
"Haunted" (with Shane MacGowan)	1995	—	—	—	6	—	—	—	—	30	—	The Snake
"Empire" (US promo) (with Bomb the Bass and Benjamin Zephaniah)	1996	—	—	—	—	—	—	—	—	—	—	Clear
"Va, Pensiero" (with Zucchero)	1997	—	17	52	—	6	—	—	19	—	—	The Best of Zucchero... Greatest Hits
"Release" (with Afro Celt Sound System)	2000	—	—	—	—	—	—	—	—	71	—	Volume 2: Release
"Guide Me God" (with Ghostland featuring Natacha Atlas)	2002	—	—	—	—	—	—	—	—	—	—	Ghostland
"Tears from the Moon" (with Conjure One)	2002	—	—	—	—	—	91	—	—	—	—	Conjure One
"1000 Mirrors" (with Asian Dub Foundation)	2003	—	—	—	—	—	—	—	—	—	—	Enemy of the Enemy
"Special Cases" (with Massive Attack)	2003	—	—	—	—	25	—	—	—	15	—	100th Window
"Illegal Attacks" (with Ian Brown)	2007	—	—	—	32	—	—	—	—	16	—	The World Is Yours
"Jackie, Is It My Birthday?" (with The Wolfmen)	2009	—	—	—	—	—	—	—	—	—	—	Married to the Eiffel Tower
"It's Only Life" (with Elaine Paige)	2010	—	—	—	—	—	—	—	—	—	—	Elaine Paige and Friends
"When a Child Is Born" (with Danny O'Reilly)	2012	—	—	—	26	—	—	—	—	—	—	A Murray Christmas
"Do They Know It's Christmas?" (with Band Aid 30)	2014	3	5	3	1	11	4	2	5	1	63	Non-album singles
"Tears from the Moon" (with Conjure One)(anamé Remix)	2022	—	—	—	—	—	—	—	—	—	—	Non-album singles
"—" denotes a recording that did not chart or was not released in that territory.

== Other appearances ==
=== As primary artist ===
Year	Song	Album	Album type	Notes
1988	"Some Day My Prince Will Come"	Stay Awake	tribute	Disney cover
1990	"You Do Something to Me"	Red Hot + Blue	charity	Bing Crosby cover
1991	"Sacrifice"	Two Rooms	tribute	Elton John cover
1992	"I Believe in You"	A Very Special Christmas 2	various artists	Bob Dylan cover
1993	"Religious Persuasion"	Peace Together	various artists	with Billy Bragg and Andy White
1994	"My Man's Gone Now"	The Glory of Gershwin	tribute	George & Ira Gershwin cover
1994	"You Make Me Feel So Free"	No Prima Donna	tribute	Van Morrison cover
1995	"Ode to Billie Joe"	The Help Album	charity	Bobbie Gentry cover
1995	"Mná na h-Éireann"	Ain't Nuthin' But a She Thing	various artists	Irish folk song
1997	"Make Me a Channel of Your Peace"	Diana, Princess of Wales: Tribute	tribute	traditional song
1998	"Skibbereen"	The Long Way Home	charity	traditional song
1998	"The Butcher Boy"	The Butcher Boy	soundtrack	traditional song
1998	"Someone to Watch Over Me"	Red Hot + Rhapsody	charity	Gershwin cover
1998	"I Guess the Lord Must Be in New York City"	You've Got Mail	soundtrack	Harry Nilsson cover
2000	"When You Love"	Rugrats in Paris	soundtrack	original song
2001	"Wake Up and Make Love with Me"	Brand New Boots & Panties	tribute	Ian Dury cover
2003	"Dagger Through the Heart"	Just Because I'm a Woman: Songs of Dolly Parton	tribute	Dolly Parton cover
2007	"Back Where You Belong"	The Water Horse: Legend of the Deep	soundtrack	original song
2008	"Angel"	Bones	soundtrack	
2008	"Baby, Let Me Buy You a Drink"	Wells for Zoë: Water for Life	charity	featuring Liam Ó Maonlaí
2010	"Song to the Siren"	Music of Ireland: Welcome Home	various artists	Tim Buckley cover
2012	"Property of Jesus"	Chimes of Freedom	charity	Bob Dylan cover
2012	"When a Child Is Born"	A Murray Christmas	charity	recorded for with RTÉ Danny O'Reilly and RTÉ CO
2012	"Once in Royal David's City"	A Murray Christmas	charity	recorded for RTÉ
2016	"Trouble Will Soon Be Over"	God Don't Never Change: The Songs of Blind Willie Johnson	tribute	Blind Willie Johnson cover
2020	"I'll Be Singing"	Wild Mountain Thyme	soundtrack	original song
2021	"No Need to Argue"	Salvation (Inspired By the Cranberries for Pieta)	tribute	The Cranberries cover

=== Other songs ===
Year	Title	Release	Notes
2008	"The Ballad of Ronnie Drew"	digital charity single	U2, The Dubliners, Kíla and A Band of Bowsies (featuring O'Connor)
2009	"I'm Every Woman"	digital charity single	ActionAid, featuring O'Connor and others
2010	"Thank You For Hearing Me" (a cappella)	digital charity single	re-recording of song from Universal Mother
2011	"From a Distance"	digital charity single	Magdalene Survivors Together, featuring O'Connor and others

=== Guest appearances ===
Year	Song	Album	Artist(s)
1985	"Take My Hand"	Original demo	In Tua Nua featuring O'Connor
1989	"Middle of the Island"	Voyage (by Christy Moore)	Christy Moore featuring O'Connor
1989	"The Mad Lady & Me"	Voyage (by Christy Moore)	Christy Moore featuring O'Connor
1989	"Kingdom of Rain"	Mind Bomb	The The
1990	"Mother"	The Wall – Live in Berlin	Roger Waters, featuring The Band and O'Connor
1991	"Sweet Divinity"	Rising Above Bedlam	Jah Wobble featuring O'Connor
1992	"Josey Walsh"	The Ungodly Kingdom EP	Jah Wobble featuring O'Connor
1992	"Come Talk to Me"	Us	Peter Gabriel featuring O'Connor
1994	"Emma"	Wakafrika	Manu Dibango featuring O'Connor
1994	"Homeless"	Wakafrika	Manu Dibango featuring O'Connor
1994	"Lady	Wakafrika	Manu Dibango featuring O'Connor
1995	"He Moved Through the Fair"	The Long Black Veil	The Chieftains featuring O'Connor
1995	"The Foggy Dew"	The Long Black Veil	The Chieftains featuring O'Connor
1995	"Mraya"	Mraya	Abdel Ali Slimani featuring O'Connor
1996	"On Raglan Road" (traditional)	Common Ground	Dónal Lunny featuring O'Connor
1996	"Civil War", "Easter Rebellion", "She Moved Through the Fair"	Michael Collins	Elliot Goldenthal featuring O'Connor
1996	"Reaching for the Rail"	Broken China	Richard Wright featuring O'Connor
1996	"Breakthrough"	Broken China	Richard Wright featuring O'Connor
1998	"Summer's End"	(OST) The Avengers	Ashtar Command featuring O'Connor
1998	"Danny Boy"/"The Derry Air"	The Sea of Dreams	Davy Spillane featuring O'Connor
1998	"The Dreaming of the Bones"	The Sea of Dreams	Davy Spillane featuring O'Connor
1998	"Blue"	Ghostland	Ghostland featuring O'Connor
1998	"Your Time Will Come"	Ghostland	Ghostland featuring O'Connor
1999	"Factory Girl" (traditional)	Tears of Stone	The Chieftains featuring O'Connor
1999	"Vervaceous"	Millionaires	James featuring O'Connor
1999	"I Defeat" (B-side of "Just Like Fred Astaire")	Millionaires	James featuring O'Connor
1999	"Lullaby for Cain"	The Talented Mr. Ripley	Gabriel Yared featuring O'Connor
2000	"Roísín Dubh"	I Could Read the Sky	Iarla Ó Lionáird featuring O'Connor
2000	"Singing Bird" (traditional)	I Could Read the Sky	Iarla Ó Lionáird featuring O'Connor
2001	"Angels Eyes"	Interview with the Angel	Ghostland featuring O'Connor
2001	"She's So Beautiful"	Waiting for This Madness to End...	Aslan featuring O'Connor
2001	"Up In Arms"	Waiting for This Madness to End...	Aslan featuring O'Connor
2001	"The Shores of the Swilly"	Lake of Shadows	Phil Coulter featuring O'Connor
2001	"Love Is a Place I Dream of"	Between the Mountain and the Moon	Luka Bloom featuring O'Connor
2001	"Moonslide"	Between the Mountain and the Moon	Luka Bloom featuring O'Connor
2001	"Soshin"	Between the Mountain and the Moon	Luka Bloom featuring O'Connor
2002	"Harbour"	18	Moby featuring O'Connor
2003	"One More Day", "Funeral Song"	Veronica Guerin	Harry Gregson-Williams featuring O'Connor
2003	"What Your Soul Sings"	100th Window	Massive Attack featuring O'Connor
2003	"Special Cases"	100th Window	Massive Attack featuring O'Connor
2003	"A Prayer for England"	100th Window	Massive Attack featuring O'Connor
2003	"Simple Heart"	Something Dangerous	Natacha Atlas featuring O'Connor
2003	"1000 Mirrors"	Enemy of the enemy	Asian Dub Foundation featuring O'Connor
2003	"I Dreamt I Dwelt in Marble Halls"	On Song	Brian Kennedy featuring O'Connor
2003	"Anarchie Gordon"	Libertango	Sharon Shannon featuring O'Connor
2003	"The Seven Rejoices of Mary" (traditional)	Libertango	Sharon Shannon featuring O'Connor
2004	"Celtic Tiger"	Seize the Day	Damien Dempsey featuring O'Connor
2004	"Negative Vibes"	Seize the Day	Damien Dempsey featuring O'Connor
2004	"Regina Coeli"	Biscantorat	Nóirín Ní Riain featuring O'Connor
2004	"O come, O come, Emmanuel"	Biscantorat	Nóirín Ní Riain featuring O'Connor
2004	"The Darkest Midnight"	Biscantorat	Nóirín Ní Riain featuring O'Connor
2004	"The Seven Rejoices of Mary" (traditional)	Biscantorat	Nóirín Ní Riain featuring O'Connor
2007	"A New Born Child"	(OST) La Premier Ci (French film)	Armand Amar featuring O'Connor
2008	"Everything Comes from You"	Big Blue Ball	Peter Gabriel featuring O'Connor
2008	"The Telephone"	Johnny Pyro and the Dance of Evil	Republic of Loose featuring O'Connor
2010	"Seabirds"	2010 Recordings	Monahans featuring O'Connor
2011	"Fallout"	Prayer Cycle 2: Path to Zero	Jonathan Elias featuring O'Connor
2011	"Tinseltown in the Rain"	Lifelines	Andrea Corr featuring O'Connor
2011	"Lay Your Head Down"	OST Albert Nobbs	Brian Byrne featuring O'Connor
2012	"Don't Take All Night"	Pour une Âme Souveraine	Meshell Ndegeocello featuring O'Connor
2012	"Almighty Love"	Almighty Love	Damien Dempsey featuring O'Connor
2012	"Fire in the Glen"	Almighty Love	Damien Dempsey featuring O'Connor
2012	"Chris and Stevie"	Almighty Love	Damien Dempsey featuring O'Connor
2012	"Bustin' Outta Here"	Almighty Love	Damien Dempsey featuring O'Connor
2013	"GMF"	Pale Green Ghosts	John Grant featuring O'Connor
2013	"Why Don't You Love Me Anymore"	Pale Green Ghosts	John Grant featuring O'Connor
2013	"It Doesn't Matter to Him"	Pale Green Ghosts	John Grant featuring O'Connor
2013	"Black Is the Colour" (traditional)	The Irish Connection	Brian McFadden featuring O'Connor
2013	"Who Knows Where the Time Goes?"	My Dearest Dear	Lumiere featuring O'Connor
2013	"Glacier"	Gets Schooled (EP)	John Grant featuring O'Connor
2013	"Cinderella"	My Songs, My Friends	Don Baker featuring O'Connor
2013	"Woe to the Holy Vow"	My Songs, My Friends	Don Baker featuring O'Connor and Damien Dempsey
2014	"I Would Die 4 U"	Purple Reggae	Radio Riddler featuring O'Connor
2015	"Death of Samantha"	This Is What I Dub	Boy George featuring O'Connor
2018	"One More Yard"	One More Yard EP	Evamore featuring O'Connor

== Videos ==
=== Video albums ===
Year	Title	Format	Notes
1989	The Value of Ignorance	VHS	These titles were re-released in 2004 as Live: The Year of the Horse/The Value of Ignorance
1991	The Year of the Horse	VHS	These titles were re-released in 2004 as Live: The Year of the Horse/The Value of Ignorance
2003	Goodnight, Thank You, You've Been a Lovely Audience	DVD	Live record featuring bonus videos and extra material
2008	Live at the Sugar Club	DVD	Sold exclusively on her official website.

=== Music videos ===
Year	Video	Director(s)
1987	"Troy"	John Maybury
1988	"Mandinka"	John Maybury
1988	"I Want Your (Hands on Me)"	John Maybury
1988	"Jerusalem"	John Maybury
1988	"Jump in the River"	John Maybury
1990	"Nothing Compares 2 U"	John Maybury
1990	"The Emperor's New Clothes" (Version 1)	John Maybury
1990	"The Emperor's New Clothes" (Version 2)	Sophie Muller
1990	"You Do Something to Me"	John Maybury
1991	"My Special Child"	John Maybury
1992	"Visions of You"	?
1992	"Success Has Made a Failure of Our Home"	?
1992	"Blood of Eden"	Michael Coulson • Nichola Bruce
1994	"You Made Me the Thief of Your Heart"	Jim Sheridan
1994	"Thank You for Hearing Me"	Richard Heslop
1994	"Fire on Babylon"	Michel Gondry
1995	"Famine"	Andy Delaney • Monty Whitebloom
1995	"All Apologies"	?
1995	"Haunted" (with Shane MacGowan)	Wayne Holloway
1997	"This Is to Mother You"	John Maybury
1997	"This Is a Rebel Song"	?
1999	"Chiquitita"	Sophie Muller
2000	"No Man's Woman"	Mike Lipscombe
2000	"Jealous"	Mike Lipscombe
2000	"When You Love"	?
2003	"1000 Mirrors"	Henri-Jean Debon
2007	"Back Where You Belong"	?
2008	"We People (Who Are Darker Than Blue)"	?
2012	"The Wolf Is Getting Married"	Roman Rappak
2013	"4th and Vine"	Kathryn Ferguson
2014	"Woe to the Holy Vow"	Bernie Masterson • Gerry Hendrick
2014	"Take Me to Church"	James Lees
2014	"8 Good Reasons"	Hugh O'Conor
2020	"Trouble of the World"	Don Letts
