= She Who Dwells in the Secret Place of the Most High Shall Abide Under the Shadow of the Almighty =

Compilation album by Sinéad O'Connor
- Released: 2003
- Recorded: 1986–2002
- Genre: Rock
- Length: Disc 1: 75:13 Disc 2: 65:38 Total: 140:51
- Label: Roadrunner
- Producer: Various

Sinéad O'Connor chronology
Sean-Nós Nua (2002)	She Who Dwells in the Secret Place of the Most High Shall Abide Under the Shadow of the Almighty (2003)	Collaborations (2005)

Professional ratings
Review scores
Source	Rating
AllMusic	4.5/5 stars

She Who Dwells in the Secret Place of the Most High Shall Abide Under the Shadow of the Almighty is a 2003 double album by Sinéad O'Connor.

It is a two-CD set. The first CD collects several rare tracks O'Connor recorded as B-sides, for soundtrack albums or in collaboration with other artists, and the second disc contains a live concert.

The album's title is a modification of Psalm 91, verse 1. This is the same psalm that gave O'Connor's first album, The Lion and the Cobra, its name.

== Track listing ==
=== Disc one ===
Disc one collects a variety of rare tracks. It includes collaborations with Massive Attack, Asian Dub Foundation, Adrian Sherwood and Roger Eno, covers of songs by ABBA, The B-52's, and Aretha Franklin, and readings of traditional Latin liturgical hymns

1. "Regina Caeli" (Traditional) – 1:03
2. "O Filii et Filiæ" (Traditional) – 3:14
3. "My Love I Bring" (Pablo Moses) – 3:55
4. "Do Right Woman, Do Right Man" (Chips Moman, Dan Penn) – 3:55
5. "Love Hurts" (Boudleaux Bryant) – 4:03
6. "Ain't It a Shame" (Keith Strickland, Cindy Wilson, Ricky Wilson) – 4:31
7. "Chiquitita" (Benny Andersson, Björn Ulvaeus) – 3:50
8. "Brigidine Diana" (O'Connor) – 4:14
9. "It's All Good" (Damien Dempsey) – 5:09
10. "Love Is Ours" (O'Connor, Neil Davidge, Robert Del Naja) – 4:45
11. "A Hundred Thousand Angels" (Andrew Blissett, Lucinda Mary Drayton) – 3:20
12. "You Put Your Arms Around Me" (O'Connor, Rick Nowels) – 4:59
13. "Emma's Song" (MacDonald, O'Connor, Adrian Sherwood) – 4:22
14. "No Matter How Hard I Try" (O'Connor, David A. Stewart, Eno) – 4:24
15. "Dense Water, Deeper Down" (O'Connor) – 3:34
16. "This IS a Rebel Song" (O'Connor) – 3:49
17. "1000 Mirrors" (Aniruddha Das, John Pandit, Steve Chandra Savale, Delbert Tailor) – 4:53
18. "Big Bunch of Junkie Lies" (O'Connor) – 4:03
19. "Song of Jerusalem" (Traditional) – 5:52

=== Disc two ===
Disc two is a live performance recorded at Dublin's Vicar Street Theatre in 2002. Six tracks are taken from O'Connor's 2002 album Sean-Nós Nua, and three each come from Universal Mother and O'Connor's most famous album, I Do Not Want What I Haven't Got. One song, "You Made Me the Thief of Your Heart", was recorded by O'Connor for the soundtrack to the 1993 film In the Name of the Father, and does not appear on any of O'Connor's studio albums.

1. "Molly Malone" (Traditional) – 3:56
2. "Óro, Sé do Bheatha 'Bhaile" (Traditional) – 3:07
3. "The Singing Bird" (Traditional) – 4:25
4. "My Lagan Love" (Traditional) – 5:12
5. "I Am Stretched on Your Grave" (Philip King) – 4:43
6. "Nothing Compares 2 U" (Prince) – 5:40
7. "John, I Love You" (O'Connor) – 5:30
8. "The Moorlough Shore" (Traditional) – 5:41
9. "You Made Me the Thief of Your Heart" (Paul Hewson, Gavin Friday, Morris Roycroft) – 4:38
10. "Paddy's Lament" (Traditional) – 5:36
11. "Thank You for Hearing Me" (O'Connor, John Reynolds) – 5:12
12. "Fire on Babylon" (O'Connor, John Reynolds) – 7:32
13. "The Last Day of Our Acquaintance" (O'Connor) – 5:58

== Chart performance ==
Chart (2003)	Peak position
Australian Albums (ARIA)	101
U.S Top Independent Albums	39
French Albums Chart	90
Belgian Albums Chart (Flanders)	46
UK Independent Albums (Official Charts)	30
