= So Far... The Best Of =

Greatest hits album by Sinéad O'Connor
- Released: 10 November 1997
- Recorded: 1987–1997
- Genres: Rock; pop
- Label: Chrysalis
- Producer: Various

Sinéad O'Connor chronology
Gospel Oak (1997)	So Far... The Best Of (1997)	Faith and Courage (2000)

Professional ratings
Review scores
Source	Rating
AllMusic	3/5 stars
Robert Christgau	A
Entertainment Weekly	A−
Music Week	4/5 stars
NME	5/10 stars
The Rolling Stone Album Guide	4/5 stars
Uncut	4/5 stars

So Far... The Best Of is a greatest hits album released by Irish singer Sinéad O'Connor in 1997. The collection features songs appearing on O'Connor's first four studio albums, along with several non-album collaborations. "Heroine" and "Empire" are also included on O'Connor's 2005 compilation album Collaborations. The album was her last album with Chrysalis Records, as she later moved to Atlantic Records in 1998.

== Track listings ==
=== International ===
1. "Nothing Compares 2 U" (Prince)
2. "Mandinka" (O'Connor)
3. "The Emperor's New Clothes" (O'Connor)
4. "Thank You for Hearing Me" (O'Connor, John Reynolds)
5. "The Last Day of Our Acquaintance" (O'Connor)
6. "Fire on Babylon" (O'Connor, Reynolds)
7. "Troy" (O'Connor)
8. "I Am Stretched on Your Grave" (Traditional, arranged by O'Connor)
9. "Jackie" (O'Connor)
10. "Success Has Made a Failure of Our Home" (Mullins, O'Connor)
11. "John I Love You" (O'Connor)
12. "Empire" (Bomb the Bass featuring Benjamin Zephaniah and Sinéad O'Connor) (Tim Simenon, O'Connor, Zephaniah)
13. "Don't Cry for Me, Argentina" (Tim Rice, Andrew Lloyd Webber)
14. "You Made Me the Thief of Your Heart" (Bono, Friday, Seezer)
15. "This Is a Rebel Song" (O'Connor)

=== North American ===
1. "Nothing Compares 2 U" (Prince)
2. "Mandinka" (O'Connor)
3. "The Emperor's New Clothes" (O'Connor)
4. "The Last Day of Our Acquaintance" (O'Connor)
5. "Fire on Babylon" (O'Connor, Reynolds)
6. "Troy" (O'Connor)
7. "I Am Stretched on Your Grave" (Traditional, arranged by O'Connor)
8. "Success Has Made a Failure of Our Home" (Mullins, O'Connor)
9. "John, I Love You" (O'Connor)
10. "Empire" (Bomb the Bass featuring Benjamin Zephaniah and Sinéad O'Connor) (Simenon, O'Connor, Zephaniah)
11. "I Want Your (Hands on Me)" (O'Connor, Reynolds, Dean, Clowes, Holifield)
12. "Heroine" (The Edge featuring Sinéad O'Connor and Larry Mullen Jr.) (The Edge, Brook, O'Connor)
13. "Don't Cry for Me, Argentina" (Tim Rice, Andrew Lloyd Webber)
14. "You Made Me the Thief of Your Heart" (Bono, Gavin Friday, Maurice Seezer)
15. "Just Like U Said It Would B" (O'Connor)

== Charts ==
Chart performance for So Far... The Best Of
Chart (1997–2000)	Peak position
Austrian Albums (Ö3 Austria)	27
Belgian Albums (Ultratop Flanders)	20
Dutch Albums (Album Top 100)	42
German Albums (Offizielle Top 100)	97
Irish Albums (IRMA)	3
New Zealand Albums (RMNZ)	27
Scottish Albums (Official Charts)	47
UK Albums (Official Charts)	28

Chart performance for So Far... The Best Of
Chart (2023)	Peak position
German Albums (Offizielle Top 100)	94
Scottish Albums (Official Charts)	38
UK Albums (Official Charts)	70

== Certifications and sales ==
Certifications and sales for So Far... The Best Of
Region	Certification	Certified units/sales
Netherlands (NVPI)	Gold	50,000^{^}
United Kingdom (BPI)	Gold	203,525
United States	—	74,000
^{^} Shipments figures based on certification alone.
