= No Man's Woman =

No Man's Woman may refer to:

- No Man's Woman (album), 2007 tribute album to female musicians
- "No Man's Woman" (song), 2000 song by Sinéad O'Connor
- No Man's Woman (1953 film), Swedish film
- No Man's Woman (1955 film), American film
