= Goodnight, Thank You, You've Been a Lovely Audience =

2003 DVD featuring Sinéad O'Connor

- Starring: Sinéad O'Connor
- Distributed by: Eagle Rock Entertainment
- Release date: 2003
- Running time: 150 minutes
- Language: English

Goodnight, Thank You, You've Been a Lovely Audience is a DVD featuring Sinéad O'Connor. It was released on 26 August 2003 and contains footage from her goodbye concert in her hometown Dublin in 2002. In addition to the concert performance, the DVD contains extra material consisting of a documentary about the making of the album Sean-Nós Nua and various interviews and behind the scenes footage as well as six bonus videos.

== Track listing ==
No.	Title	Length
1.	"Molly Mallone" (traditional)
2.	"Óro, Sé do Bheatha 'Bhaile" (traditional)
3.	"The Singing Bird" (traditional)
4.	"My Lagan Love" (traditional)
5.	"I Am Stretched on Your Grave" (Philip King/F.O'Connor)
6.	"Nothing Compares 2 U" (Prince)
7.	"John, I Love You" (Coulter/O'Connor)
8.	"The Moorlough Shore" (traditional)
9.	"You Made Me the Thief of Your Heart" (Hewson/Friday/Roycroft)
10.	"Paddy's Lament" (traditional)
11.	"Thank You for Hearing Me" (O'Connor/Reynolds)
12.	"Fire on Babylon" (O'Connor/Reynolds)
13.	"The Last Day of Our Acquaintance" (O'Connor)

Bonus videos:

- Peggy Gordon
- Molly Malone
- The Moorlough Shore
- The Singing Bird
- My Lagan Love
- Óró, Sé Do Bheatha 'Bhaile

== Extra material ==
- Making of Sean-Nós Nua
- Backstage footage
- Interviews
