= Jealous (Sinéad O'Connor song) =

2000 song by Sinéad O'Connor

Single by Sinéad O'Connor

from the album Faith and Courage
- B-side: "Summer's End"; "Full Circle"
- Released: 31 October 2000
- Length: 4:18
- Label: Atlantic
- Songwriters: Sinéad O'Connor; David A. Stewart
- Producer: David A. Stewart

Sinéad O'Connor singles chronology
"No Man's Woman" (2000)	"Jealous" (2000)	"Troy (The Phoenix from the Flame)" (2002)

Music video
- "Sinead O'Connor - Jealous" on YouTube

"Jealous" is a song recorded by Irish singer Sinéad O'Connor for her fifth studio album Faith and Courage (2000). It was released as the album's second single on 31 October 2000, by Atlantic Records.

== Background ==
In 1998, Sinéad O'Connor left label Ensign Records and signed with Atlantic Records, but her album was delayed due to the birth of her daughter as well as several personal struggles, including an alleged suicide attempt, a bitter custody battle and becoming a priestess in a religious order. O'Connor described Faith and Courage, her first album with Atlantic, as a record about "survival" which depicted her own troubled "journey" as she bared her soul on a series of autobiographical and often cathartic songs. "It's exciting and a little scary to be back. I wanted to make a record which was strong and positive. It's about getting my spirit back on its feet and standing up", she said.

== Composition ==
Wall of Sound commented that the song "ruminate on loves lost, found, and, in most cases, fondly remembered".

== Critical reception ==
Davíð Logi Sigurðsson, while reviewing Faith and Courage for Icelandic newspaper Morgunblaðið, thought that "Jealous" was probably the best song on the album. AllMusic's MacKenzie Wilson noted that she sounded "lonely" on the song.

== Music video ==
The music video was directed by Mike Lipscombe and was released in 2000.

== Track listing ==
European CD single

1. "Jealous (Album Version)" – 4:19
2. "Summer's End" – 5:40
3. "Full Circle" – 3:44

== Personnel ==
- Sinéad O'Connor – vocals, songwriter, producer
- David A. Stewart – songwriter, producer, guitar
- Jah Wobble – bass
- John Reynolds – drums
- Nick Addison – engineer
- Graham Dominy – engineer assistant
- Kieran Kiely – keyboards
- Ed Rockett – low whistle
- Caroline Dale – strings
- Andy Wright – programming
- Mark Price – programming
- Ash Howes – mixing
- Emily Lazar – mastering

== Charts ==
Chart (2000)	Peak position
Australia (ARIA Charts)	58
Belgium (Ultratip Bubbling Under Flanders)	6
Belgium (Ultratip Bubbling Under Wallonia)	11
Netherlands (Single Top 100)	94
Scotland Singles (OCC)	95
UK Singles (OCC)	81
