= Never Get Old =

Never Get Old may refer to:

- "Never Get Old", a song by Sinéad O'Connor from her 1987 album The Lion and the Cobra
- "Never Get Old", a song by David Bowie from his 2003 album Reality
