= The Value of Ignorance =

- Starring: Sinéad O'Connor
- Distributed by: Ensign Records
- Release date: 1989
- Running time: 35 minutes
- Language: English

The Value of Ignorance is a VHS released by singer/songwriter Sinéad O'Connor in 1989. The concert was recorded live at the Dominion Theatre in London, on June 3, 1988. The concert was re-released in 2004 in DVD format as Live: The Year of the Horse/The Value of Ignorance.

== Track listing ==
No.	Title	Length
1.	"Jackie" (O'Connor)
2.	"Just Like U Said It Would B" (O'Connor/Wickham)
3.	"Mandinka" (O'Connor)
4.	"Just Call Me Joe" (O'Connor/Mooney/Winer)
5.	"Never Get Old" (O'Connor)
6.	"Jerusalem" (O'Connor/McMordie/Clowes/Reynolds)
7.	"Troy" (O'Connor)
8.	"I Am Stretched on Your Grave" (Philip King/F.O'Connor)

== Credits ==
- Sinéad O'Connor – Vocals, Guitar
- Frankie Hepburn, John Mills – Guitars
- Andy Rourke – Bass Guitar
- Mike Joyce – Drums
- Phil Thornton – Keyboards
- Directed by John Maybury.
