= Collaborations (Sinéad O'Connor album) =

Compilation album by Sinéad O'Connor
- Released: 21 June 2005
- Recorded: 1986 – 2004
- Genre: Rock
- Label: Capitol
- Producer: Various

Sinéad O'Connor chronology
She Who Dwells in the Secret Place of the Most High Shall Abide Under the Shadow of the Almighty (2003)	Collaborations (2005)	Throw Down Your Arms (2005)

Professional ratings
Aggregate scores
Source	Rating
Metacritic	(68/100)
Review scores
Source	Rating
AllMusic	3.5/5 stars
Robert Christgau	(choice cut)
Mojo	3/5 stars
PopMatters	6/10 stars
Splendid Magazine	(mixed)

Collaborations is a compilation album released by Irish singer Sinéad O'Connor in 2005. The album contains songs recorded throughout O'Connor's career on which she collaborated with a variety of artists, spanning several different genres of music. Many of these tracks appeared on the albums of the artists with whom O'Connor performs. The tracks "Empire" and "Heroine" also appear on So Far... The Best of Sinéad O'Connor, released in 1997. One track - "Monkey in Winter" - had never been released on CD before, and was previously released as B-side on a 12" only.

== Track listing ==
1. "Special Cases" (radio edit) (with Massive Attack, 2004) – 3:48
2. "1000 Mirrors" (with Asian Dub Foundation, 2003) – 4:54
3. "Empire" (with Bomb the Bass, 1996) – 5:50
4. "Guide Me God" (with Ghostland, 1998) – 3:31
5. "Visions of You" (with Jah Wobble's Invaders of the Heart, 1991) – 4:21
6. "Release" (album edit) (with Afro Celt Sound System, 1999) – 4:14
7. "Wake Up and Make Love with Me" (with Blockheads, 2001) – 4:58
8. "Kingdom of Rain" (album version) (with The The, 1989) – 5:51
9. "I'm Not Your Baby" (with U2, 1997) – 5:50
10. "Tears from the Moon" (album version) (with Conjure One, 2001) – 4:18
11. "Blood of Eden" (radio edit) (with Peter Gabriel, 1993) – 5:05
12. "Harbour" (with Moby, 2002) – 6:25
13. "Up in Arms" (with Aslan, 2001) – 3:40
14. "It's All Good" (with Damien Dempsey, 2003) – 4:23
15. "Heroine (Theme from Captive)" (with The Edge, 1986) – 4:25
16. "Monkey in Winter" (with The Colourfield, 1987) – 5:01
17. "All Kinds of Everything" (with Terry Hall, 1998) – 2:44

== Personnel ==
- Asian Dub Foundation – Producer, Engineer
- Howie B – Producer, Mixing
- Louis Beckett – Organ, Producer, Engineer
- Paul Bergen – Photography
- Bono – Vocals
- Mark Borthwick – Photography
- David Bottrill – Producer, Engineer, Mixing
- Alan Branch – Producer, Mixing
- Michael Brook – Producer
- George Chin – Photography
- Adam Clayton – Bass
- Nick Coplowe – Producer, Engineer
- Neil Davidge – Producer
- Robert "3D" Del Naja – Vocals, Keyboards, Producer
- Pearse Dunne – Engineer
- The Edge – Guitar, Keyboards, Vocals
- Simon Emmerson – Producer
- Brian Eno – Producer
- Paul Falcone – Assistant
- Flood – Producer
- Greg French – Assistant
- Rhys Fulber – Producer
- Peter Gabriel – Vocals, Producer
- Chris Garcia – Engineer
- Reece Gilmore – Programming
- Richard Gottehrer – Producer
- Ian Grimble – Producer, Mixing
- Rachel Gutek – Artwork
- Terry Hall – Vocals, Producer
- Steve Howe – Guitar, Vocals
- Don Hozz – Programming
- Mick Hutson – Photography
- Invaders of The Heart – Producer
- Matt Johnson – Vocals, Guitar, Keyboards
- Felix Kendall – Producer, Engineer, Mixing
- Kieran Kiely – Keyboards
- Rob Kirwan – Assistant
- Clive Langer – Producer
- Daniel Lanois – Producer
- Claire Lewis – Assistant Engineer
- Steve Lillywhite – Producer, Remixing
- Warne Livesey – Producer
- James McNally – Producer
- Sonia Mehta – Vocals
- Marco Migliari – Assistant Engineer
- Moby – Vocals, Producer, Mixing
- Kevin Moloney – Engineer
- Larry Mullen Jr. – Drums
- Gil Norton – Producer, Remixing
- Rick Nowels – Producer
- Adam Nunn – Mastering
- Linda Nylind – Photography
- Ed O'Brien – Guitar, Vocals
- Sinéad O'Connor – Vocals, Guitar
- Rob OGeigheannaigh – Tin Whistle
- Steve Osborne – Vocal Producer
- Q – Engineer
- Nigel Reeve – A&R
- Brian Reeves – Producer, Mixing
- John Reynolds – Drums, Producer, Vocal Engineer
- Carmen Rizzo – Programming
- Jake Rousham – Engineer
- Martin Russell – Producer, Engineer
- Al Scott – Engineer
- Adrian Sherwood – Producer, Mixing
- Tim Simenon – Producer, Mixing
- Dave Slevin – Engineer
- Mark "Spike" Stent – Producer, Engineer, Mixing
- Adrian Thrills – Liner Notes
- Randy Wine – Engineer
- Alan Winstanley – Producer
- Nick Wollage – Engineer
