= Michael Clayton (soundtrack) =

Film score by James Newton Howard
- Released: September 25, 2007
- Recorded: 2007; Fox Scoring Stage, Capitol Studios & JNH Studios
- Length: 38:35
- Label: Varèse Sarabande
- Producer: James Newton Howard & Stuart Michael Thomas

James Newton Howard chronology
| The Lookout (2007) | Michael Clayton (2007) | The Water Horse: Legend of the Deep (2007) |

Professional ratings
Review scores
| Source | Rating |
|---|---|
| Filmtracks | 1/5 stars |
| Music From The Movies | 2/5 stars |
| Movie Music UK | 1.5/5 stars |
| Movie Wave | 1/5 stars |
| SoundtrackNet | 3.5/5 stars |

Michael Clayton: Original Motion Picture Soundtrack is the original soundtrack of the 2007 drama film, Michael Clayton, starring George Clooney, Tom Wilkinson, and Tilda Swinton. The original score was composed by James Newton Howard. The album was released on September 25, 2007 on the Varèse Sarabande label.

== Awards ==
Howard was nominated for an Academy Award for Best Original Score.

== Track listing ==
All tracks composed by James Newton Howard.

1. "Main Titles" – 2:12
2. "Chinatown" – 2:27
3. "Drive to the Field" – 1:35
4. "Just Another Day" – 2:20
5. "Meeting Karen" – 2:46
6. "Looking for Arthur" – 1:41
7. "U North" – 1:49
8. "Arthur & Henry" – 2:11
9. "Times Square" – 3:38
10. "Mr. Verne" – 2:28
11. "I'm Not the Guy You Kill" – 6:57
12. "Horses" – 2:13
13. "25 Dollars Worth" – 6:27

Performed by The Hollywood Studio Symphony. Conducted by Blake Neely.
