= Three Babies =

1990 song by Sinéad O'Connor

Single by Sinéad O'Connor

from the album I Do Not Want What I Haven't Got
- B-side: "Damn Your Eyes"; "Troy"; "The Value of Ignorance"
- Released: 8 October 1990
- Studio: S.T.S. (Dublin, Ireland)
- Length: 4:46
- Label: Ensign; Chrysalis
- Songwriter: Sinéad O'Connor
- Producer: Sinéad O'Connor

Sinéad O'Connor singles chronology
"The Emperor's New Clothes" (1990)	"Three Babies" (1990)	"Success Has Made a Failure of Our Home" (1992)

Music video
- "Three Babies" on YouTube

"Three Babies" is a song by Irish singer-songwriter Sinéad O'Connor, released as the third single from her second studio album, I Do Not Want What I Haven't Got (1990), in October 1990. Written and produced by O'Connor, the single was issued by Ensign and Chrysalis Records. It received favorable reviews from many music critics, who also named it a highlight from the album. A moderate success in Europe, the song peaked at number 13 in Italy, number 19 in Ireland, and number 22 in Switzerland. In the UK, it reached number 42. A music video was also produced to promote the single.

The song appears on the soundtrack for the Northern Irish film Hush-a-Bye-Baby, in which O'Connor co-starred.

== Critical reception ==
In a 2007 review, The Daily Vault's Michael R. Smith described the song as a "somewhat dull, slow and creaky number". Upon the release, Scottish Dundee Courier named it a "highlight" from the album. Dave Jennings from Melody Maker named it Single of the Week, writing, "Admittedly, "The Emperor's New Clothes" was a little shapeless, but this solemn beauty demands respect. Sinead treats us to one of her most flesh-tearing vocal performances, and the immaculate string arrangement adds further compelling gravity. Exquisite." Duncan Holland from Music Week commented, "A ballad, with strings attached, gives no doubt about the sincerity involved, but fails to make that vital step from being a good LP track to a valid single." Pan-European magazine Music & Media called it a "compelling" and "haunting" tune. Another editor viewed it as a "soft and quiet, fragile song from this great singer."

James Brown from New Musical Express said it's "sweet, soothing, delicate", adding that it "has a rare beauty. Forgive her the sleeping horse and shoeless waif look in the video, after all, her voice has such immaculate power." Parry Gettelman from Orlando Sentinel felt her voice is "tantalizingly opaque", saying that "the strange words to "Three Babies" give a sense of love and devotion, but it's hard to say what the three babies represent." In a 2015 retrospective review, Pop Rescue wrote that it gives O'Connor "another place to show off her wonderfully soft vocals and harmonies." The reviewer added, "At times her vocals remind me a bit of Enya, and this aided by the wash of strings that swell throughout". Irish Sunday Independent noted that "emotions tumble" from songs such as "Three Babies". Sunday Tribune said it's "compelling", remarking its "softness".

== Track listing ==
- CD single, UK and Europe
1. "Three Babies" (Sinead O'Connor)
2. "Damn Your Eyes" (Barbara Wyrick, Steve Bogard)
3. "Troy" (Sinead O'Connor)
4. "The Value of Ignorance" (Andy Rourke , Sinead O'Connor)

== Charts ==
Chart (1990)	Peak position
Australia (ARIA)	108
Belgium (Ultratop 50 Flanders)	35
Europe (Eurochart Hot 100)	93
Ireland (IRMA)	19
Italy (Musica e dischi)	13
Netherlands (Dutch Top 40 Tipparade)	2
Netherlands (Single Top 100)	29
Switzerland (Schweizer Hitparade)	22
UK Singles (OCC)	42
