= No Man's Woman (album) =

Studio album by Various
- Released: 20 October 2007
- Recorded: 2007
- Genre: Pop/Rock, electronic
- Length: 88:38
- Label: Dew Process; Universal

No Man's Woman or No Man's Woman: Tribute to Women in Voice is a tribute album to female musicians by various Australian male musicians performing cover versions to recognise the contributions that female artists have made to the international music industry. It was released in Australia on 20 October 2007 via Dew Process, and was introduced to radio on 17 September of the same year. No Man's Woman peaked in the top 50 of the ARIA Albums Chart.

== History ==
No Man's Woman was developed out of a desire by fans to hear Australian rock group You Am I perform a cover of a Patti Smith song. While that group did not contribute to the tribute album, the wish from music fans was the basis for its formulation, which was released on Australia's Dew Process record label. It was named for Sinéad O'Connor's track of that name from her June 2000 album, Faith and Courage; however that track is not covered for this tribute.

No Man's Woman was released in Australia on 20 October 2007 via Dew Process, and was introduced to radio on 17 September of the same year. It comprises two discs, with the second one having nine tracks as performed by the female artists who popularised each one. It peaked at No. 42 on the ARIA Albums Chart in its first week. According to The ARIA Report's writer it "is chock-full of male Aussie artists doing covers of songs made famous by female artists."

The United States version, No Man's Woman: Tribute to Women in Voice, appeared on 22 October 2007. The A&R and concept is credited to Graham Ashton.

== Track listing ==
=== Disc one ===
1. Angus Stone – "River" (Joni Mitchell)
2. Powderfinger – "Glory Box" (Portishead)
3. The Vines – "4ever" (The Veronicas)
4. Expatriate – "Missing" (Everything but the Girl)
5. Lior – "Landslide" (Fleetwood Mac)
6. Bob Evans – "Car Wheels on a Gravel Road" (Lucinda Williams)
7. End Of Fashion – "Hanging on the Telephone" (Blondie)
8. Dan Kelly – "Nothing Compares 2 U" (Sinéad O'Connor)
9. Whitley – "Hyperballad" – (Björk)
10. Josh Pyke – "Wuthering Heights" (Kate Bush)
11. Paul Kelly – "To Bring You My Love" (PJ Harvey)
12. Gyroscope – "Cannonball" (The Breeders)
13. Grinspoon – "Boys in Town" (Divinyls)
14. Tex Perkins and His Ladyboyz – "I Am Woman" (Helen Reddy)

=== Disc two ===
1. Portishead – "Glory Box"
2. The Veronicas – "4ever"
3. Everything but the Girl – "Missing"
4. Lucinda Williams – "Car Wheels on a Gravel Road"
5. Björk – "Hyperballad"
6. Sinéad O'Connor – "Nothing Compares 2 U"
7. Blondie – "Hanging On The Telephone"
8. Divinyls – "Boys in Town"
9. Helen Reddy – "I Am Woman"
