= Live at the Sugar Club =

- Starring: Sinéad O'Connor
- Distributed by: Rubyworks
- Release date: 2008
- Running time: 40 minutes
- Language: English

Live at the Sugar Club is the name of a DVD and CD set released by singer/songwriter Sinéad O'Connor in 2008. The set features a live concert performance by O'Connor from November 8, 2006 at The Sugar Club in Dublin, Ireland. It was sold exclusively on her website in a limited number of two thousand copies.

== Track listing ==
CD/DVD track list
| No. | Title | Writer(s) | Length |
|---|---|---|---|
| 1. | "Something Beautiful" | O'Connor | 6:47 |
| 2. | "Out of the Depths" | O'Connor | 5:03 |
| 3. | "If You Had a Vineyard" | O'Connor | 6:39 |
| 4. | "The Glory of Jah" | O'Connor, Tomlinson | 3:50 |
| 5. | "Whomsoever Dwells" | O'Connor, Tomlinson | 4:08 |
| 6. | "I Don't Know How to Love Him" | Andrew Lloyd Webber, Tim Rice | 4:19 |
| 7. | "We People Who Are Darker Than Blue" | Curtis Mayfield | 3:58 |
| 8. | "33" | O'Connor | 3:10 |
| 9. | "Rivers of Babylon" | Traditional | 3:28 |

== Personnel ==
- Sinéad O'Connor – vocals, guitar
- Steve Cooney – guitar
- Vinnie Kilduff – mandolin, low whistle
- Laoise Kelly – harp
- Odhrán O'Casaide – violin
- Produced by O'Connor.

== Extra material ==
- An Introduction to Theology – Interview with Sinéad O'Connor
