= I Want Your (Hands on Me) =

Single by Sinéad O'Connor featuring MC Lyte

from the album The Lion and the Cobra
- Released: 18 April 1988
- Recorded: 1986–87
- Studio: Oasis Studios (Camden, London)
- Length: 4:39
- Label: Chrysalis
- Songwriter(s): Sinéad O'Connor, Mike Clowes, John Reynolds, Rob Dean, Spike Holifield
- Producer(s): Sinéad O'Connor; Kevin Mooney

Sinéad O'Connor singles chronology
"Mandinka" (1987)	"I Want Your (Hands on Me)" (1988)	"Jump in the River" (1988)

MC Lyte singles chronology
"I Cram to Understand U (Sam)" (1987)	"I Want Your (Hands on Me)" (1987)	"10% Dis" (1988)

Music video
- "I Want Your (Hands on Me)" on YouTube

Professional ratings
Review scores
Source	Rating
AllMusic	4.5/5 stars

"I Want Your (Hands on Me)" is a song performed by Irish singer-songwriter Sinéad O'Connor. The song was released in April 1988 by Chrysalis as the fourth single from her debut album, The Lion and the Cobra (1987) and was later remixed to include rapper MC Lyte. O'Connor co-wrote it with Mike Clowes, John Reynolds, Rob Dean and Spike Holifield. And she also co-produced it with Kevin Mooney.

== Remix ==
In 1988, O'Connor released two remixed versions of "I Want Your (Hands on Me)" featuring rapper MC Lyte, "a grittier 'Street' mix and a 'Dance' mix both mixed by Audio Two".

Curious why O'Connor had requested she be featured on the song, MC Lyte asked, "Why do you want me?” MC Lyte indicated O'Connor was intrigued by one of MC Lyte's lyrics ("Shut the fuck up"), especially that a "young person [was] using this language to get her point across and she wanted [MC Lyte] to say the words exactly like that on the remix."

Okayplayer noted, "At face value, MC Lyte and Sinéad O’Connor are a pretty unorthodox pairing, though really they were kindred spirits. [...] Individually, their music is diametrically opposed in sound. [...] However, when the two joined forces [...], it was like night and day met in an eclipse. A moment that changed the course for women in hip-hop simply by giving them another avenue to explore."

== Critical reception ==
Upon the release, Ben Thompson from NME wrote, "'Rocking It Live Non-stop', or something like that, it's Sinead O'Connor and MC Lyte. The thinking woman's Kate Bush is in danger of becoming the thinking man's Kate Bush if she doesn't watch it. The follow-up to the devilishly catchy 'Mandinka' is a strange throbbing sort of a song which dares to rhyme 'Please Me' with 'Tease Me'. You gave a little wink I guess you knew, apparently. This one will take a bit of getting used to." In 2021, Pitchfork said "I Want Your (Hands on Me)" is O'Connor's "rare song that feels modeled after hits of the era, an early attempt at blending her blunt-force, hip-hop influence with gentler melodic gifts."

Following O'Connor's death in July 2023, multiple news sources recognized "I Want Your (Hands on Me)" among other songs in her repertoire. The Guardian, Los Angeles Times, Spin, and Billboard included it on their lists of O'Connor's best songs.

The Guardian's Annie Zaleski said the song "was revolutionary in its own way. Musically, it was a sensual funk seduction with a liquid bass groove and percolating hip-hop beats; the aural equivalent of O’Connor’s forthright lyrics, which are frank on sexual desire, and her unapologetic come-hither vocals."

Stephen Thomas Erlewine, writing for Los Angeles Times, wrote, "O’Connor’s music burns so brightly in its intensity that the playfulness of 'I Want Your (Hands on Me)' remains startling. Setting the song to a bright, bustling drum loop, O’Connor sings over a hip-hop beat, her longing serving as a tantalizing contrast to the colorful rhythms." They continued, noting, "O’Connor never attempted this kind of hybrid again, which is part of the reason that "I Want Your (Hands on Me)” remains compelling on its own terms: It hints at roads she may have taken."

Billboard referred to the song as "funky" and "seductive," saying "O'Connor makes her point unmistakable".

Variety included the song on their list of O'Connor's "12 [...] Finest Musical Moments." They called the song "commandingly sexual and breathy," noting that O'Connor "pinned her cooing vocal and icy, sensual lyrics to a clunky programmed pulse".

== Media appearances ==
"I Want Your (Hands on Me)" was featured in Miami Vice and A Nightmare on Elm Street 4: The Dream Master.

== Charts ==
Chart performance for " I Want Your (Hands on Me)"
Chart (1988)	Peak position
New Zealand (Recorded Music NZ)	40
UK Singles (OCC)	77
