= I Do Not Want What I Haven't Got =

Studio album by Sinéad O'Connor
- Released: 12 March 1990
- Recorded: 1988–1989
- Studios: S.T.S (Dublin, Ireland); Britannia Row (London, UK); Lansdowne (London, UK); Eden (London, UK)
- Genres: Rock; folk
- Length: 51:09
- Labels: Ensign; Chrysalis
- Producers: Nellee Hooper; Sinéad O'Connor

Sinéad O'Connor chronology
The Lion and the Cobra (1987)	I Do Not Want What I Haven't Got (1990)	Am I Not Your Girl? (1992)

Singles from I Do Not Want What I Haven't Got
- 1. "Nothing Compares 2 U" Released: 8 January 1990; 2. "The Emperor's New Clothes" Released: 5 June 1990; 3. "Three Babies" Released: 8 October 1990

I Do Not Want What I Haven't Got is the second studio album by the Irish singer Sinéad O'Connor, released on 12 March 1990 by Ensign/Chrysalis Records. It contains O'Connor's version of the Prince song "Nothing Compares 2 U", which was released as a single and reached number one in multiple countries. The album was nominated for four Grammy Awards in 1991, including Record of the Year, Best Female Pop Vocal Performance, and Best Music Video, Short Form for "Nothing Compares 2 U", winning the award for Best Alternative Music Performance. However, O'Connor refused to accept the nominations and award. The album has sold over seven million copies worldwide.

== Content ==
The critically-acclaimed album contains O'Connor's most famous single, "Nothing Compares 2 U", which was one of the best-selling singles in the world in 1990, topping the charts in many countries including the United States, Australia, the United Kingdom and Canada. This rendition of the Prince song reflected on O'Connor's mother, who had died in an auto accident five years earlier. The single "Emperor's New Clothes" found moderate success, although it did top the Modern Rock Tracks chart in the US.

The first song on the album, "Feel So Different", starts with the Serenity Prayer by Reinhold Niebuhr. The album also includes O'Connor's rendition of "I Am Stretched on Your Grave", an anonymous 17th-century poem that was written in Irish, translated into English by Frank O'Connor, and composed by musician Philip King in 1979. O'Connor's version uses a loop of "Funky Drummer" by James Brown.

== Critical reception ==
Professional ratings
Review scores
Source	Rating
AllMusic	4.5/5 stars
Christgau's Consumer Guide	B+
Entertainment Weekly	A
Los Angeles Times	4/5 stars
NME	8/10
Pitchfork	7.8/10
Q	4/5 stars
Record Collector	4/5 stars
Rolling Stone	4.5/5 stars
Slant Magazine	4.5/5 stars

I Do Not Want What I Haven't Got received critical acclaim. Entertainment Weekly ranked it as the best album of 1990, calling the record "a spiritual victory, full of wisdom wrested from audible pain." In 2012, it was ranked number 408 on Rolling Stone magazine's list of the 500 greatest albums of all time. The album was ranked number 457 on the 2020 edition of the list. Slant Magazine included it on their 2003 list of 50 Essential Pop Albums.

== Track listing ==
=== Original release ===
All tracks are written by Sinéad O'Connor, except where noted

Original release track listing
No.	Title	Writer(s)	Length
1.	"Feel So Different"		6:47
2.	"I Am Stretched on Your Grave"	Anonymous; vocal melody: Philip King; arranged by Chris Birkett, John Reynolds and Sinéad O'Connor	5:33
3.	"Three Babies"		4:47
4.	"The Emperor's New Clothes"		5:16
5.	"Black Boys on Mopeds"	arranged by Karl Wallinger and Sinéad O'Connor	3:53
6.	"Nothing Compares 2 U"	Prince	5:10
7.	"Jump in the River"	O'Connor; Marco Pirroni	4:12
8.	"You Cause as Much Sorrow"		5:04
9.	"The Last Day of Our Acquaintance"		4:40
10.	"I Do Not Want What I Haven't Got"		5:47
Total length:			51:09

=== Bonus disc (2009) ===
All tracks are written by Sinéad O'Connor, except where noted

Bonus disc track listing
No.	Title	Writer(s)	Length
1.	"Night Nurse"	Gregory Isaacs; Sylvester Weise	4:54
2.	"My Special Child"		4:48
3.	"Damn Your Eyes"	Barbara Wyrick; Steve Bogard	4:46
4.	"Silent Night" (long version)	Traditional	4:45
5.	"You Do Something to Me"	Cole Porter	2:36
6.	"Mind Games"	John Lennon	5:26
7.	"What Do You Want"		2:58
8.	"I Am Stretched on Your Grave" (Apple Brightness Mix)		5:38
9.	"Troy" (recorded live in London)		6:41
10.	"I Want Your (Hands on Me)" (live at Hammersmith Odeon)	O'Connor; Clowes; Reynolds; Rob Dean; Spike Hollifield	3:53
11.	"The Value of Ignorance"		3:20
Total length:			49:45

== Personnel ==
Credits adapted from the album's liner notes.

- Sinéad O'Connor – vocals, acoustic guitar, electric guitar, keyboards, programming, arranger, producer, string arrangements
- Marco Pirroni – guitar on "The Emperor's New Clothes"
- David Munday – acoustic guitar and piano on "You Cause As Much Sorrow"
- Andy Rourke – bass guitar on "The Emperor's New Clothes", "Jump in the River" and "You Cause As Much Sorrow", acoustic guitar on "Jump in the River"
- Jah Wobble – bass guitar on "The Last Day of Our Acquaintance"
- John Reynolds – drums and percussion on "The Emperor's New Clothes", "You Cause As Much Sorrow" and "The Last Day of Our Acquaintance"
- Kieran Kiely – keyboards, accordion, piano
- Steve Wickham – fiddle on "I Am Stretched on Your Grave"
- The Muses – backing vocals
- Philip King – vocals, melody arrangement
- Nick Ingman – conductor, orchestra director, string arrangement on "Feel So Different"
- Karl Wallinger – arranger
- Nellee Hooper – co-producer on "Nothing Compares 2 U"
- Chris Birkett – engineering
- Sean Devitt – engineering
- Dave Hoffman – photography
- Dominique Le Rigoleur – photography
- John Maybury – cover design

== Charts ==
=== Weekly charts ===
Weekly chart performance for I Do Not Want What I Haven't Got
Chart (1990)	Peak position
Australian Albums (ARIA)	1
Austrian Albums (Ö3 Austria)	1
Belgian Albums (IFPI)	1
Canada Top Albums/CDs (RPM)	1
Danish Albums (Hitlisten)	2
Dutch Albums (Album Top 100)	1
European Albums (Music & Media)	1
Finnish Albums (The Official Finnish Charts)	1
French Albums (SNEP)	4
German Albums (Offizielle Top 100)	1
Greek Albums (IFPI Greece)	1
Icelandic Albums (Tónlist)	1
Irish Albums (IRMA)	1
Italian Albums (FIMI)	1
New Zealand Albums (RMNZ)	1
Norwegian Albums (VG-lista)	1
Portuguese Albums (AFP)	3
Spanish Albums (AFYVE)	2
Swedish Albums (Sverigetopplistan)	1
Swiss Albums (Schweizer Hitparade)	1
UK Albums (Official Charts)	1
US Billboard 200	1

Weekly chart performance for I Do Not Want What I Haven't Got
Chart (2023)	Peak position
UK Album Downloads	6
UK Independent Albums (Official Charts)	13

=== Year-end charts ===
Year-end chart performance for I Do Not Want What I Haven't Got
Chart (1990)	Position
Australian Albums (ARIA)	30
Austrian Albums (Ö3 Austria)	3
Canada Top Albums/CDs (RPM)	1
Dutch Albums (MegaCharts)	8
European Albums (Music & Media)	2
French Albums (SNEP)	17
German Albums Chart	2
New Zealand Albums (RMNZ)	11
Swiss Albums (Schweizer Hitparade)	6
UK Albums (OCC)	16
US Billboard 200	19

== Certifications and sales ==
Certifications and sales for I Do Not Want What I Haven't Got
Region	Certification	Certified units/sales
Australia (ARIA)	Platinum	70,000^{^}
Austria (IFPI Austria)	Gold	25,000^{*}
Canada (Music Canada)	5× Platinum	500,000^{^}
France (SNEP)	Platinum	300,000^{*}
Germany (BVMI)	Platinum	500,000^{^}
Ireland	—	60,000
Italy	—	250,000
Netherlands (NVPI)	Platinum	100,000^{^}
New Zealand (RMNZ)	Platinum	15,000^{^}
Spain (Promusicae)	Platinum	100,000^{^}
Sweden (GLF)	Platinum	100,000^{^}
Switzerland (IFPI Switzerland)	Gold	25,000^{^}
United Kingdom (BPI)	2× Platinum	711,832
United States (RIAA)	2× Platinum	2,000,000^{^}
Summaries
Worldwide	—N/a	7,000,000
^{*} Sales figures based on certification alone.^{^} Shipments figures based on certification alone.

== See also ==
- List of 1990s albums considered the best
- List of Billboard 200 number-one albums of 1990
- List of Canadian number-one albums of 1990
- List of UK Albums Chart number ones of the 1990s
