= The Water Horse: Legend of the Deep (soundtrack) =

The Water Horse: Legend of the Deep – Original Motion Picture Soundtrack

Soundtrack album by James Newton Howard
- Released: December 7, 2007
- Genre: Film score
- Length: 58:45
- Label: Sony Classical
- Producer: James Newton Howard

James Newton Howard chronology
Michael Clayton (2007)	The Water Horse: Legend of the Deep – Original Motion Picture Soundtrack (2007)	I Am Legend (2007)

Professional ratings
Review scores
Source	Rating
Allmusic	4/5 stars
ScoreNotes	8.5/10 stars
Filmtracks	4/5 stars

The Water Horse: Legend of the Deep – Original Motion Picture Soundtrack is a soundtrack album which contains James Newton Howard's original score to Jay Russell's 2007 film of the same name. Sinéad O'Connor and The Chieftains each contribute a song to the soundtrack as well.

== Track listing ==
All music is composed by James Newton Howard, except where otherwise noted.

No.	Title	Writer(s)	Length
1.	"Back Where You Belong" (performed by Sinéad O'Connor)	Sinead O'Connor	4:26
2.	"The Water Horse Main Title"		1:08
3.	"Angus Feeds Crusoe"		1:59
4.	"You Didn't Even Get Wet"		2:56
5.	"The Workshop"		2:34
6.	"Naming Crusoe"		3:46
7.	"Churchill"		1:21
8.	"Ann"		1:27
9.	"Bathtub"		2:22
10.	"Driving to the Loch"		1:59
11.	"Run Angus"		1:19
12.	"Lewis Discovers Crusoe"		4:24
13.	"The Fishermen"		1:37
14.	"Angus in Training"		2:52
15.	"Swimming"		6:33
16.	"The Children Laugh"		2:58
17.	"The Dinner Party"		3:01
18.	"Angus Sent to His Room"		2:25
19.	"There's No Monster"		2:00
20.	"Saving Crusoe"		2:04
21.	"The Net"		4:22
22.	"The Jump"		1:40
23.	"End of the Story"		3:03
24.	"The Water Horse Suite" (performed by The Chieftains)	James Newton Howard; The Chieftains	8:08
