= Sean-Nós Nua =

Studio album by Sinéad O'Connor
- Released: 8 October 2002
- Recorded: 2001–2002
- Studios: Ashford, Co. Wicklow; On-U-Sound Studio (London, England)
- Genres: Folk; Celtic; sean-nós
- Length: 66:06
- Languages: English; Irish
- Label: Vanguard
- Producers: Dónal Lunny; Alan Branch; Adrian Sherwood; Sinéad O'Connor

Sinéad O'Connor chronology
Faith and Courage (2000)	Sean-Nós Nua (2002)	She Who Dwells in the Secret Place of the Most High Shall Abide Under the Shadow of the Almighty (2003)

Professional ratings
Aggregate scores
Source	Rating
Metacritic	65/100
Review scores
Source	Rating
AllMusic	4/5 stars
Blender	3/5 stars
Entertainment Weekly	B+
The Guardian	3/5 stars
Los Angeles Times	3/4 stars
Mojo	3.5/5 stars
Pitchfork	6.3/10
Q	2/5 stars
Record Collector	4/5 stars
Rolling Stone	3/5 stars

Sean-Nós Nua is the sixth studio album by Irish singer Sinéad O'Connor, released on 8 October 2002, by Vanguard Records. It consists of covers of traditional Irish folk songs. The title means "new old-style" in Irish Gaelic, and also referring to the popular style of traditional Irish vocal music sean-nós.

== Track listing ==
Sean-Nós Nua track listing
No.	Title	Writer(s)	Length
1.	"Peggy Gordon"	Traditional; arranged by Sinéad O'Connor, Dónal Lunny, Cora Venus Lunny, Rob O'Geigheannaigh, Steve Wickham, Sharon Shannon	5:38
2.	"Her Mantle So Green"	Traditional; arranged by O'Connor, Lunny, O Geibheannaigh, Shannon, Alan Branch, Kieran Kiely	5:35
3.	"Lord Franklin"	Traditional; arranged by O'Connor, Lunny, Adrian Maxwell, C.V. Lunny, Branch, Wickham, Pete Lockett	4:59
4.	"The Singing Bird"	Traditional; arranged by O'Connor, Lunny, Shannon, Wickham, Branch, O Geibheannaigh	4:27
5.	"Óró Sé do Bheatha 'Bhaile"	Traditional; arranged by O'Connor, Lunny, Branch, A. Maxwell, Carlton Ogilvie	3:19
6.	"Molly Malone"	Traditional; arranged by O'Connor, Lunny, C.V. Lunny, A. Maxwell, Bernard Alexander	3:32
7.	"Paddy's Lament"	Traditional; arranged by O'Connor, Lunny, Branch, Shannon, A. Maxwell, B. Alexander, Professor Stretch	5:26
8.	"The Moorlough Shore"	Traditional; arranged by O'Connor, Lunny, B. Alexander, Branch, Kiely, Bernard O'Neill, A. Maxwell	5:25
9.	"The Parting Glass"	Traditional; arranged by O'Connor, Lunny, Branch, C.V. Lunny, Kiely	4:31
10.	"Báidín Fheilimí"	Traditional; arranged by O'Connor, Lunny, Ogilvie, Branch, A. Maxwell	3:20
11.	"My Lagan Love"	Traditional; arranged by O'Connor, Lunny, Branch, A. Maxwell, Wickham, Professor Scretch, Lockett	4:42
12.	"Lord Baker" (with Christy Moore)	Traditional; arranged by Moore, Lunny, O'Connor	11:38
13.	"I'll Tell Me Ma"	Traditional; arranged by O'Connor, Lunny, Kiely, Wickham, Branch	2:21

Japanese bonus tracks
No.	Title	Length
14.	"Spanish Lady"
15.	"Marble Halls"

== Personnel ==
- Sinéad O'Connor – vocals
- Dónal Lunny – acoustic guitar, bouzouki, keyboards, bodhran, backing vocals
- Steve Wickham – fiddle (except tracks 7, 12 and 13), mandolin, banjo
- Sharon Shannon – accordion on track 9
- Alan Branch – percussion on track 12
- Abdullah Chhadeh – quanun
- Nick Coplowe – Hammond organ
- Pete Lockett – percussion (except tracks 1, 9, 12 and 13)
- Cora Venus Lunny – violin on tracks 1, 3, 5, 6 and 7, Viola tracks 1 & 9
- Kieran Kiely – keyboards, accordion
- Skip McDonald – electric guitar, backing vocals
- Christy Moore – vocals and guitar on track 12
- Carlton "Bubblers" Ogilvie – drums, bass guitar, piano
- Bernard O'Neill – bass
- Adrian Shortman / "Professor Stretch" – drums, programming

== Charts ==
Chart performance for Sean-Nós Nua
Chart (2002)	Peak position
Australian Albums (ARIA)	61
Austrian Albums (Ö3 Austria)	29
Belgian Albums (Ultratop Flanders)	34
Dutch Albums (Album Top 100)	93
European Albums (Music & Media)	57
French Albums (SNEP)	69
Irish Albums (IRMA)	3
Scottish Albums (Official Charts)	57
Swiss Albums (Schweizer Hitparade)	67
UK Albums (Official Charts)	52
US Billboard 200	139
US Top Internet Albums (Billboard)	21
US Top World Albums (Billboard)	1
UK Independent Albums (Official Charts)	7

== See also ==
- Goodnight, Thank You, You've Been a Lovely Audience – a 2003 live video album by O'Connor which features a documentary on the making of this album
