= Gospel Oak (EP) =

1997 EP by Sinéad O'Connor

EP by Sinéad O'Connor
- Released: 3 June 1997
- Recorded: 1997
- Genre: Folk rock
- Length: 35:02
- Label: Chrysalis
- Producers: Sinéad O'Connor; John Reynolds; Dónal Lunny

Sinéad O'Connor chronology
Universal Mother (1994)	Gospel Oak (1997)	So Far... The Best Of (1997)

Professional ratings
Review scores
Source	Rating
AllMusic	link
The A.V. Club	favorable link
Robert Christgau	(neither)
Entertainment Weekly	B Gospel Oak
Music Week	4/5 stars
Rolling Stone	link

Gospel Oak is an EP by Irish singer Sinéad O'Connor. The album sold 70,000 copies in the United States.

The album is named after the London neighbourhood of Gospel Oak where O’Connor was living at the time. The cover photograph shows the two brick skew arch bridges adjacent to Gospel Oak railway station in north London. It was dedicated to "the people of Israel, Rwanda and Northern Ireland".

== Critical reception ==
British magazine Music Week rated the EP four out of five, writing, "Motherhood is treating O'Connor well, judging by this angst-free, truly beautiful EP on which the acoustic, traditional instrumentation is the perfect foil for her stunning voice. Another Chrysalis number one?" David Sinclair from The Times commented, "The Gaelic avenger in a gentle, devotional mood."

== Track listing ==
No.	Title	Writer(s)	Length
1.	"This Is to Mother You"	O'Connor	3:13
2.	"I Am Enough for Myself"	O'Connor	4:07
3.	"Petit Poulet"	O'Connor	3:44
4.	"4 My Love"	O'Connor	4:06
5.	"This Is a Rebel Song"	O'Connor	3:03
6.	"He Moved Through the Fair"	Traditional; arranged by O'Connor, Dónal Lunny and Graham Henderson	4:22
7.	"Fire on Babylon" (Eternal Recurrence Mix)	O'Connor; Reynolds	13:26

The UK release contains only the first four tracks. The Japanese release contains tracks 1–4 and 7, and a US release contains track 1–6 on one CD and track 7 on a bonus CD.

== Personnel ==
- Sinéad O'Connor – vocals, electric guitar on track 5
- John Reynolds – drums, bass guitar, programming
- Clare Kenny – bass guitar
- Justin Adams – guitar
- Caroline Dale – cello
- Carol Issacs – piano, accordion
- Ian Stanley, Graham Henderson – keyboards
- Davy Spillane – Uilleann pipes
- Ed Rockett – low and high whistle
- The Muses – backing vocals
- Jah Wobble – bass guitar on track 3
- Andy Wright – programming on track 3
- Dónal Lunny – bouzouki

== Charts ==
Chart (1997)	Peak position
Australia (ARIA)	118
Austrian Albums (Ö3 Austria)	49
Canada Top Albums/CDs (RPM)	94
UK Singles (Official Charts)	28
US Billboard 200	128
