= Universal Mother =

Studio album by Sinéad O'Connor
- Released: 12 September 1994
- Recorded: 1993–1994
- Studios: Westland Studios (Dublin, Ireland)
- Genre: Chamber folk
- Length: 52:50
- Labels: Ensign; Chrysalis
- Producers: Sinéad O'Connor; John Reynolds; Tim Simenon; Phil Coulter

Sinéad O'Connor chronology
Am I Not Your Girl? (1992)	Universal Mother (1994)	Gospel Oak (1997)

Singles from Universal Mother
- 1. "Fire on Babylon" Released: August 1994; 2. "Thank You for Hearing Me" Released: November 1994; 3. "Famine" Released: August 1995

Professional ratings
Initial reviews (in 1994)
Review scores
Source	Rating
Billboard	(favorable)
Cash Box	(favorable)
Robert Christgau	B−
Entertainment Weekly	B+
Knoxville News Sentinel	4/5 stars
Los Angeles Times	2.5/4 stars
Melody Maker	(favorable)
Music & Media	(favorable)
Music Week	4/5 stars
NME	8/10
Q	4/5 stars
Rolling Stone	4/5 stars

Professional ratings
Retrospective reviews (after 1994)
Review scores
Source	Rating
AllMusic	3/5 stars

Universal Mother is the fourth studio album by Irish singer Sinéad O'Connor, released on 12 September 1994.

"That album was the first attempt to try to expose what was really underneath a lot of the anger of the other records," she explained, adding, "George Michael told me he loved that record, but could only listen to it once because it was so painful. He had to hide it."

== Background ==
In 1993, O'Connor started taking singing lessons in the style of bel canto. This inspired her to "talk about the things that [she] really wanted to talk about".

== Music and lyrics ==
The first track, "Germaine", is a recording of feminist Germaine Greer speaking about cooperation as an alternative to patriarchy.

"Am I a Human?" is by O'Connor's son Jake, recorded when he was a child. "'Famine'" (the quotes are hers) is a hip-hop track about the Great Famine and how it impacted Ireland.

The last song, "Thank You for Hearing Me", was written about O'Connor's breakup with musician Peter Gabriel and features a trance-like backing track. The majority of the songs on the album use "delicate piano-based arrangements".

== Artwork ==
O'Connor painted the cover art, which was inspired by a rebirthing session she experienced as well as the song "All Babies".

== Critical reception ==
Billboard magazine wrote that O'Connor made "a broad thematic statement about pain, grief, love, and redemption, and has swaddled that statement in a musical soundscape, at once delicate and lush, that evokes the dreamy landscape of a lilting Irish lullaby. There's a wolf in these twilight woods, of course, as O'Connor wraps her mesmerizing voice around tales of abuse (the simmering 'Red Football') and seemingly unbearable pain ('Tiny Grief Song'). The most topical number is the rap rant 'Famine'-which borrows from everything from 'Fiddler on the Roof' to 'Eleanor Rigby'. But there also are daubs of pure, timeless beauty present, as in the unabashedly gentle 'John I Love You' and 'My Darling Child'. It is on the shoulders of these haunting numbers that O'Connor's message—and ultimately her album—rests."

In Hot Press, Bill Graham said that it is "definitely the record of an artist determined to restart, with a totally new set of basic principles". Noting the album had divided critical opinion, he suggested that its art-as-therapy approach resembled early solo work by John Lennon. O'Connor explores "the uncharted depths" of "the real loveless family traumas" that mainstream, predominantly male, rock music tends to avoid, and Graham believes her journey is made more intense by her identity "as both a mother and a daughter". Listening to the album can be "unnerving", as O'Connor "can still sing like an angel but she also sometimes writes lyrics like an emotional dyslexic". Its predominant style is "a bare chamber-folk".

Melody Maker named it "her best album to date" and "one of the albums of the year". Alan Jones from Music Week wrote, "Once more into the confessional for this resilient talent and, it has to be said, once more she comes up with the goods." For Rolling Stone, Stephanie Zacharek characterized Universal Mother as "record making as therapy" and described it as tenderhearted and protective.

== Track listing ==
Universal Mother track listing
No.	Title	Writer(s)	Producer(s)	Length
1.	"Germaine"	Germaine Greer		0:38
2.	"Fire on Babylon"	O'Connor, John Reynolds	O'Connor, John Reynolds, Tim Simenon	5:11
3.	"John I Love You"	O'Connor	O'Connor, John Reynolds, Phil Coulter	5:31
4.	"My Darling Child"	O'Connor	O'Connor, John Reynolds, Coulter	3:09
5.	"Am I a Human?"	Jake Reynolds	Jake Reynolds	0:24
6.	"Red Football"	O'Connor	O'Connor, John Reynolds, Coulter	2:48
7.	"All Apologies"	Kurt Cobain	O'Connor	2:37
8.	"A Perfect Indian"	O'Connor	O'Connor, John Reynolds, Coulter	4:22
9.	"Scorn Not His Simplicity"	Coulter	O'Connor, Coulter	4:26
10.	"All Babies"	O'Connor	O'Connor, John Reynolds	4:29
11.	"In This Heart"	O'Connor	O'Connor, John Reynolds, Coulter	3:11
12.	"Tiny Grief Song"	O'Connor	O'Connor, John Reynolds, Coulter	1:56
13.	""Famine""	O'Connor, Clayton, Simenon, John Reynolds, Lennon, McCartney	O'Connor, John Reynolds, Simenon	4:56
14.	"Thank You for Hearing Me"	O'Connor, John Reynolds	O'Connor, John Reynolds, Simenon	6:25

Note: "Famine" quotes the song "Eleanor Rigby" by the Beatles.

== Personnel ==
Credits adapted from the album's liner notes.

- Sinéad O'Connor – vocals, piano
- John Reynolds – drums, programming
- Dave Clayton – keyboards, programming
- Marco Pirroni, Ivan Gilliland – guitar
- Tim Simenon – programming
- Nicky Scott, Matthew Seligman, Clare Kenny – bass
- Phil Coulter – piano, keyboards, backing vocals
- John O'Cane – cello
- Voice Squad – backing vocals
- Irish Chamber Orchestra – strings

== Charts ==
1994 weekly chart performance for Universal Mother
Chart (1994)	Peak position
Australian Albums (ARIA)	31
Austrian Albums (Ö3 Austria)	7
Canada Top Albums/CDs (RPM)	16
Dutch Albums (Album Top 100)	8
European Albums (Eurotipsheet)	13
Finnish Albums (Official Finnish Charts)	18
German Albums (Offizielle Top 100)	38
Irish Albums (IFPI)	5
New Zealand Albums (RMNZ)	38
Scottish Albums (Official Charts)	49
Swedish Albums (Sverigetopplistan)	11
Swiss Albums (Schweizer Hitparade)	11
UK Albums (Official Charts)	19
US Billboard 200	36

2023 weekly chart performance for Universal Mother
Chart (2023)	Peak position
Belgian Albums (Ultratop Flanders)	109

== Certifications and sales ==
Certifications and sales for Universal Mother
Region	Certification	Certified units/sales
Austria (IFPI Austria)	Gold	25,000^{*}
Canada (Music Canada)	Gold	50,000^{^}
United Kingdom (BPI)	Gold	100,000^{^}
United States	—	217,000
^{*} Sales figures based on certification alone.^{^} Shipments figures based on certification alone.
