= Óró sé do bheatha abhaile =

Traditional Irish song

Óró, sé do bheatha abhaile
- Folk song
- English: Oh, 'tis you are welcome home
- Genre: Traditional Irish music
- Form: Ballad
- Language: Irish

"Óró, sé do bheatha abhaile" or "Óró, sé do bheatha 'bhaile" ([ˈoːɾˠoː ʃeː d̪ˠə ˈvʲahə ˈwalʲə]) is a traditional Irish song, which also came to be known as a rebel song in the early twentieth century. Óró is a cheer, whilst sé do bheatha 'bhaile means "you are welcome home".

== History ==
Similarly to many folk songs, the origins of this song are obscure. In 1884, Francis Hogan of Brenormore, near Carrick-on-Suir, then "well over seventy years of age", reported that "this song used to be played at the 'Hauling Home', or the bringing home of a wife". The "hauling home" was a ceremony that took place a month after a wedding when a bride was brought to live in her new husband's home. This version consists only of the chorus.

Énrí Ó Muirgheasa also records a similar refrain in 1915 from the Barony of Farney, "but the song to which it belonged was lost before my time". There is no mention of "hauling home" and the line that P. W. Joyce gives as thá tu maith le rátha (Irish for ''tis you are happy with prosperity [in store for you]') is instead Tá tú amuiġ le ráiṫċe (Irish for 'You've been gone three months').

This song has also been associated with the Jacobite cause as the traditional version mentions Séarlas Óg (Irish for 'Young Charles'), referring to Bonnie Prince Charlie and dating the song to the third Jacobite rising of 1745–1746.

The tune appears as number 1425 in George Petrie's The Complete Collection of Irish Music (1855) under the title "Ó ro! 'sé do ḃeaṫa a ḃaile" (modern script: Ó ro! 'sé do bheatha a bhaile) and is marked "Ancient clan march". It can also be found at number 983 (also marked "Ancient Clan March") and as a fragment at number 1056, titled "Welcome home Prince Charley".

In the early twentieth century, it received new verses by the nationalist poet Patrick Pearse and was often sung by members of the Irish Volunteers during the Easter Rising. It was also sung as a fast march during the Irish War of Independence.

Since 1916, it has also been known under various other titles, notably "Dord na bhFiann" (Irish for 'Call of the Fighters') or "An Dord Féinne". The latter title is associated with Pearse in particular as the Irish Volunteers chanted the song during the Easter Rising. This version features the pirate or "Great Sea Warrior" Grace O'Malley, a formidable power on the west coast of Ireland in the late sixteenth century. Pearse shows his knowledge of the Jacobite version in the way he adapts it to the new independence cause. He emphasises the Irishness of the fighters by substituting native Grace for foreign Prince Charlie and changing Béidh siad leis-sean Franncaigh is Spáinnigh (Irish for 'They’ll be with him, French and Spanish') to Gaeil féin 's ní Francaigh ná Spáinnigh (Irish for 'Gaels they, and neither French nor Spaniard').

== Recordings ==
The song was recorded by The Clancy Brothers and Tommy Makem on their 1963 record album In Person at Carnegie Hall, by The Dubliners on their 1987 album 25 Years Celebration, by Cruachan on their 1995 album Tuatha na Gael, by Sinéad O'Connor on her 2002 album Sean-Nós Nua as well as her 2003 album She Who Dwells in the Secret Place of the Most High Shall Abide Under the Shadow of the Almighty, and by the Irish band Seo Linn in 2017.

A rendition of the song appeared in the final sketch of the first episode of Saturday Night Live UK, sung by cast member George Fouracres and actor Nicola Coughlan.

== Lyrics ==
=== Original version ===
Óró, sé do bheatha a bhaile, is fearr liom tú ná céad bó bainne:
Óró, sé do bheatha a bhaile, tha tu maith le ratha.

Translation:

Oro, welcome home, I would rather have you than a hundred milk cows:
Oro, welcome home, 'tis you are happy with prosperity [in store for you]).

=== Jacobite version ===
Chorus:
Óró, sé do bheatha 'bhaile,
Óró, sé do bheatha 'bhaile,
Óró, sé do bheatha 'bhaile
Anois ar theacht an tsamhraidh.

A Shéarlais Óig, a mhic Rí Shéamais
'Sé mo mhór-chreach do thriall as Éirinn
Gan tuinnte bróig' ort, stoca nó leinidh
Ach do chascairt leis na Gallaibh

Chorus

'Sé mo léan géar nach bhfeicim
Mur mbéinn beo 'na dhiaidh ach seachtain
Séarlas Óg is míle gaiscidheach
Ag fógairt fáin ar Ghallaibh

Chorus

Tá Séarlas Óg ag triall thar sáile
Béidh siad leisean, Franncaigh is Spáinnigh
Óglaigh armtha leis mar gharda
'S bainfidh siad rinnce as éiricigh!

Chorus

Translation:

Chorus:
Oh-ro, You're welcome home,
Oh-ro, You're welcome home,
Oh-ro, You're welcome home,
Now that summer's coming!

Young Charles, son of King James
It's a great distress – your exile from Ireland
Without thread of shoe on you, socks or shirt
Overthrown by the foreigners

Chorus

Alas that I do not see
If I were alive afterwards only for a week
Young Charles and one thousand warriors
Banishing all the foreigners

Chorus

Young Charles is coming over the sea
They will be with him, French and Spanish
Armed Volunteers with him as a guard
And they'll make the heretics dance!

Chorus

=== Pádraig Pearse version ===
Chorus
Óró, sé do bheatha 'bhaile,
Óró, sé do bheatha 'bhaile,
Óró, sé do bheatha 'bhaile
Anois ar theacht an tsamhraidh.

'Sé do bheatha, a bhean ba léanmhar,
Do b' é ár gcreach tú bheith i ngéibheann,
Do dhúiche bhreá i seilbh meirleach,
Is tú díolta leis na Gallaibh.

Chorus

Tá Gráinne Mhaol ag teacht thar sáile,
Óglaigh armtha léi mar gharda,
Gaeil iad féin is ní Gaill ná Spáinnigh,
Is cuirfidh siad ruaig ar Ghallaibh.

Chorus

A bhuí le Rí na bhFeart go bhfeiceam,
Mura mbeam beo ina dhiaidh ach seachtain,
Gráinne Mhaol agus míle gaiscíoch,
Ag fógairt fáin ar Ghallaibh.

Chorus

Translation:

Chorus:
Oh-ro You're welcome home,
Oh-ro You're welcome home,
Oh-ro You're welcome home...
Now that summer's coming!

Welcome oh woman who was so afflicted,
It was our ruin that you were in bondage,
Our fine land in the possession of thieves...
And you sold to the foreigners!

Chorus

Gráinne O'Malley is coming over the sea,
Armed warriors along with her as her guard,
They are Gaels, not invaders [British] nor Spanish...
And they will rout the foreigners!

Chorus

May it please the King of Miracles that we might see,
Although we may live for a week once after,
Gráinne O'Malley and a thousand warriors...
Dispersing the foreigners!

Chorus

== See also ==
- List of Irish ballads
