= Faith and Courage =

Studio album by Sinéad O'Connor
- Released: 13 June 2000
- Recorded: 1999–2000
- Genre: Pop rock
- Length: 53:59
- Label: Atlantic
- Producers: Kevin "She'kspere" Briggs; Scott Cutler; Jerry 'Wonder' Duplessis; Brian Eno; Skip McDonald; Anne Preven; John Reynolds; Adrian Sherwood; David A. Stewart; Wyclef Jean

Sinéad O'Connor chronology
So Far... The Best Of (1997)	Faith and Courage (2000)	Sean-Nós Nua (2002)

Singles from Faith and Courage
- 1. "No Man's Woman" Released: 21 April 2000; 2. "Jealous" Released: 31 October 2000

Faith and Courage is the fifth studio album by Irish singer Sinéad O'Connor, released on 13 June 2000, by Atlantic Records. It was O'Connor's first release in three years, her previous album being the greatest hits compilation So Far... The Best of Sinéad O'Connor in 1997, and her first studio album in six years.

O'Connor composed a majority of the tracks on Faith and Courage and production duties were shared by a variety of artists including Wyclef Jean, David A. Stewart, Brian Eno, Kevin "She'kspere" Briggs, Anne Preven and Scott Cutler among others.

== Background ==
In 1998, Sinéad O'Connor left label Ensign Records and signed with Atlantic Records, but her album was delayed due to her personal struggles, including the birth of her daughter, an alleged suicide attempt, a bitter custody battle and becoming a priestess in a religious order. O'Connor described Faith and Courage, her first album with Atlantic, as a record about "survival" which depicted her own troubled "journey" as she bared her soul on a series of autobiographical and often cathartic songs. "It's exciting and a little scary to be back. I wanted to make a record which was strong and positive. It's about getting my spirit back on its feet and standing up", she said.

Andy Murray, marketing director of Warner Music Europe, commented: "It's the right time for her to break her silence. [...] and everybody seems to think it's her best album since her first record. The marketing campaign is about reminding people who she is. But actually, despite the long gap, nobody seems to need reminding. There's a real excitement around the record, which has surprised a lot of people".

== Critical reception ==
Professional ratings
Aggregate scores
Source	Rating
Metacritic	64/100
Review scores
Source	Rating
AllMusic	3/5 stars
Robert Christgau	(dud)
Entertainment Weekly	B+
LA Weekly	(mixed)
NME	2.5/5 stars
Pitchfork	3.8/10
Rolling Stone	3.5/4 stars
Slant Magazine	4.5/5 stars
Spin	3/10
Wall of Sound	84/100

Faith and Courage received positive reviews from music critics, including the best ones she had received in years. Irish Hot Press magazine suggested that the album was O'Connor's equivalent of Bob Dylan's Blood on the Tracks (1975).

It was placed on Slant Magazine's list of best albums of the 2000s at number 99.

== Chart performance ==
The album was certified gold (35,000 Copies) in Australia in 2000. As of 2014, sales in the United States have exceeded 219,000 copies, according to Nielsen SoundScan.

== Track listing ==
Faith and Courage track listing
No.	Title	Writer(s)	Producer(s)	Length
1.	"The Healing Room"	O'Connor	Adrian Sherwood, Skip McDonald	5:35
2.	"No Man's Woman"	O'Connor, Scott Cutler, Anne Preven	Cutler, Preven	3:00
3.	"Jealous"	O'Connor, David A. Stewart	Stewart	4:18
4.	"Dancing Lessons"	O'Connor, Wyclef Jean, Jerry Duplessis, Blandinna Melky Jean, Jimmy Cozier	Jean, Duplessis	4:17
5.	"Daddy I'm Fine"	O'Connor, Stewart	Stewart	2:58
6.	"'Til I Whisper U Something"	O'Connor, Stewart	Stewart	6:08
7.	"Hold Back the Night"	Robert Hodgens	Stewart	4:11
8.	"What Doesn't Belong to Me"	O'Connor	Sherwood, McDonald	5:37
9.	"The State I'm In"	Cutler, Preven	Cutler, Preven	4:10
10.	"The Lamb's Book of Life"	O'Connor, Kevin "She'kspere" Briggs	Briggs	4:56
11.	"If U Ever"	O'Connor	Sherwood, McDonald	4:24
12.	"Emma's Song"	O'Connor	Brian Eno, Reynolds	3:20
13.	"Kyrié Eléison"	Traditional, arranged by O'Connor, Sherwood, McDonald, Alan Branch	Sherwood, McDonald	2:45

== Personnel ==
- Sinéad O'Connor – vocals
- Skip McDonald – guitar, backing vocals
- Carlton "Bubblers" Ogilvie – bass guitar, piano
- Professor Stretch – programming, keyboards
- Rusty Anderson, Scott Cutler, Derek Scott, David A. Stewart – guitar
- Paul Bushnell, Jah Wobble – bass guitar
- Scot Coogan, Lil John, John Reynolds, Chris Sharrock – drums
- Jeff Turzo, Simon Mundey, Mark Price, Andy Wright – programming
- David Campbell – strings arrangement, viola
- Joel Derouin – violin
- Larry Corbett – cello
- Ed Rockett – low and high whistle
- Caroline Dale – strings
- Blandinna Melky Jean – additional vocals on track 4
- Chucho Merchan – additional bass guitar on track 6
- Little Roy – backing vocals on track 6
- Zac Rae, Kieran Kiely, David Levita – keyboards
- Anne Preven – backing vocals on track 9
- Karren Berz – orchestral arrangement
- Bonjo I Abinghi Noah – percussion

== Charts ==
Chart performance for Faith and Courage
Chart (2000)	Peak position
Australian Albums (ARIA)	18
Austrian Albums (Ö3 Austria)	21
Belgian Albums (Ultratop Flanders)	20
Canada Top Albums/CDs (RPM)	18
European Albums (Music & Media)	24
Dutch Albums (Album Top 100)	46
French Albums (SNEP)	27
German Albums (Offizielle Top 100)	38
Irish Albums (IRMA)	8
Italian Albums (FIMI)	25
New Zealand Albums (RMNZ)	33
Norwegian Albums (VG-lista)	38
Swedish Albums (Sverigetopplistan)	59
Swiss Albums (Schweizer Hitparade)	19
UK Albums (Official Charts)	61
US Billboard 200	55
US Top Internet Albums (Billboard)	8
