= No Man's Woman (song) =

2000 single by Sinéad O'Connor

Single by Sinéad O'Connor

from the album Faith and Courage
- B-side: "This Is a Rebel Song" (remix); "Her Mantle So Green"
- Released: 9 May 2000
- Length: 3:00
- Label: Atlantic
- Songwriters: Sinéad O'Connor; Scott Cutler; Anne Preven
- Producers: Scott Cutler; Anne Preven

Sinéad O'Connor singles chronology
"Fire on Babylon" (1994)	"No Man's Woman" (2000)	"Jealous" (2000)

Music video
- "No Man's Woman" on YouTube

"No Man's Woman" is a song by Irish singer Sinéad O'Connor from her fifth studio album, Faith and Courage (2000). It was released as the album's lead single on 9 May 2000 by Atlantic Records.

== Background and composition ==
"No Man's Woman", the lead single from the album Faith and Courage, was sent to pop and rock stations on 21 April 2000. Andy Murray, marketing director of Warner Music Europe, commented: "It's the right time for her to break her silence. The single is very commercial and everybody seems to think it's her best album since her first record. The marketing campaign is about reminding people who she is. But actually, despite the long gap, nobody seems to need reminding. There's a real excitement around the record, which has surprised a lot of people".

According to Nigel Williamson of Music & Media, O'Connor set out "her stall as strong and forceful young woman" on the song.

O'Connor commented on the lyrics of the song:

"It talks about a soul, a female soul who does not want to be a girlfriend or a wife, but wants to be single, really, but who is very much in love with the spirit of men and wants to conduct a relationship with the spirit of men. The song also honors the woman's soul, [which] feels that her teachers will be men, her guides will be men, and her rescuers have been men. Not romantically, though, but spiritually".

== Critical reception ==
MTV News called the song "autobiographical" and "anthemic".

== Music video ==
The music video was directed by Mike Lipscombe. According to O'Connor, "The video shows kind of a symbolic death and rebirth which takes place, and which helps this woman's soul to become more of herself by following the guidance of particular male religious instructors. It's very much a song that honors man. It's interesting how people think if you reject men sexually, that this means you're somehow rejecting them entirely. But in fact, sometimes it's easier to be intimate with men when there isn't that threat of sexuality or whatever". The video was nominated at the 2000 Billboard Music Awards in the category of Best Jazz/AC Video. The video starts with O'Connor as a bride about to get married who runs off and drives the car into the ocean. She crawls onto the beach from the car, taking off the blonde wig she was wearing showing her shaved head, and runs off, over the grassy dunes back to town and nearly gets run down by a train. She collapses on a city sidewalk where a guardian angel revives her soul.

== Track listing ==
US and European CD single

1. "No Man's Woman" (album version) – 3:02
2. "This Is a Rebel Song" (remix) – 3:54
3. "Her Mantle So Green" – 2:04

== Charts ==
Chart (2000)	Peak position
Australia (ARIA)	87
Europe Airplay (European Hit Radio)	38
Netherlands (Single Top 100)	80
New Zealand (Recorded Music NZ)	42
Quebec (ADISQ)	21
US Adult Alternative Airplay (Billboard)	15

== Usage in media ==
"No Man's Woman" was used on the pilot of TV series Alias in 2001, Sydney Bristow (played by Jennifer Garner) escapes with a prototype, and delivers it to Arvin Sloane (played by Ron Rifkin).
