= Thank You for Hearing Me =

Single by Sinéad O'Connor

from the album Universal Mother
- B-side: "Fire on Babylon" (remix)
- Released: 7 November 1994
- Studio: Westland (Dublin, Ireland)
- Genre: Trip hop
- Length: 6:30
- Label: Chrysalis; Ensign
- Songwriters: Sinéad O'Connor; John Reynolds
- Producers: Sinéad O'Connor; John Reynolds; Tim Simenon

Sinéad O'Connor singles chronology
| "You Made Me the Thief of Your Heart" (1994) | "Thank You for Hearing Me" (1994) | "Fire on Babylon" (1994) |

Music video
- "Thank You For Hearing Me" on YouTube

"Thank You for Hearing Me" is a song by Irish singer-songwriter Sinéad O'Connor, released in 1994 by Chrysalis and Ensign Records as the first single from her fourth album, Universal Mother (1994). Co-written with her first husband John Reynolds and based on her recent breakup with English singer-songwriter Peter Gabriel, they also co-produced the song with English musician, composer and record producer Tim Simenon. It received positive reviews from music critics and peaked at number five in Iceland, while peaking at number 13 on the UK Singles Chart. The accompanyng music video was directed by Richard Heslop.

== Critical reception ==
J.D. Considine from The Baltimore Sun complimented 'Thank You for Hearing Me' as the "crowning glory" of Universal Mother, which with its "bone-simple melody and deep, hypnotic pulse, expresses a gratitude so heartfelt and self-effacing it seems more like a prayer than a song." Larry Flick from Billboard magazine described it as an "ethereal hip-hop track", adding that "it should intrigue those who prefer their pop with vigilant melodies and a smart passion." Steve Baltin from Cash Box named it one of "her best moments" of the album, and a "stunning conclusion". In a separate single review, he described it as "passionate, emotive, firey, beautiful. This single is a wonderful reminder of why audiences fell in love with O'Connor before all the controversy. It conveys emotion with the sincerity only she can give, using a rising crescendo before slipping into a hushed whisper near the end." Michael R. Smith from The Daily Vault wrote that the singer herself "is left with a surprising feeling of appreciation, especially for those who had stood by her through it all, and she shows her gratitude with the inspiring closer".

In his weekly UK chart commentary, James Masterton found that it "achieves almost hymn-like proportions with Sinead singing like the angel you always suspected she was. Exactly how commercial it will be remains to be seen, she has made spine-tingling records that have flopped in the past, but for the moment it is good to welcome her back to the heights." Dave Jennings from Melody Maker said, "It goes without saying that the voice is wonderful, and the track also boasts a rather excellent bassline." Pan-European magazine Music & Media commented, "Gloria in excelsis deo, Sinead is singing a prayer on a dance rhythm." Alan Jones from Music Week gave it a score of four out of five, writing, "This is an odd track; it's very simple, extremely repetitive and almost hymnal in it quiet gentleness, apart from a sinewy bassline." He concluded that "its success as a single is assured". Dele Fadele from NME praised it as "the glorious finale" of the album, saying the song is "even more groovy, music-wise as she lists a lot of good things to thank an un-named suitor for, before slipping in thank you for breaking my heart whilst a celestial backing track rolls into the horizon." Joy Press from Spin deemed it "a post-suicide-attempt song that hums with lush gratitude for life's little favors." David Yonke from Toledo Blade remarked that the singer "offers an olive branch to those who have given her a chance."

== Chart performance ==
The song charted in Europe, Australia and Israel. In Iceland, it was a top-5 hit, peaking at number five in February 1995. In Poland, it peaked at number ten. In the UK, it reached number 13 in November 1994. It entered the UK Singles Chart at number 18, and the last entry was at number 72 on 1 January 1995. In Scotland, the single peaked at number 14 in its first week on the Scottish Top 100. The last position was at number 92 on 22 January. On the Eurochart Hot 100, "Thank You for Hearing Me" reached its highest position as number 51 in December 1994, after debuting on the chart as number 70 the week before. In Australia, it charted on the ARIA singles chart, peaking at number 114. In Israel, it reached number six.

== Music video ==
The music video for "Thank You for Hearing Me" was directed by British film director Richard Heslop. It was later made available on YouTube in 2012 and had generated more than 2.2 million views as of early 2025.

== Track listing ==
- Europe, CD maxi (1994)
1. "Thank You for Hearing Me" – 6:30
2. "Fire on Babylon" (remix) – 13:27

== Charts ==
=== Weekly charts ===
| Chart (1994–1995) | Peak position |
|---|---|
| Australia (ARIA) | 114 |
| Europe (Eurochart Hot 100) | 51 |
| Iceland (Íslenski Listinn Topp 40) | 5 |
| Israel (Israeli Singles Chart) | 6 |
| Scotland (OCC) | 14 |
| UK Singles (OCC) | 13 |

=== Year-end charts ===
| Chart (1994) | Position |
|---|---|
| UK Singles (OCC) | 163 |
