= Fire on Babylon =

Single by Sinéad O'Connor

from the album Universal Mother
- Released: August 1994 (EU)
- Studio: Westland Studios (Dublin, Ireland)
- Genre: Funk-rock; neo-reggae; trip-hop
- Length: 5:12
- Label: Chrysalis; Ensign
- Songwriters: Sinéad O'Connor; John Reynolds
- Producers: Sinéad O'Connor; John Reynolds; Tim Simenon

Sinéad O'Connor singles chronology
| "Thank You for Hearing Me" (1994) | "Fire on Babylon" (1994) | "No Man's Woman" (2000) |

Music video
- "Fire on Babylon" on YouTube

"Fire on Babylon" is a song by Irish singer-songwriter Sinéad O'Connor, released in August 1994 by Chrysalis and Ensign Records as the second single from the singer's fourth album, Universal Mother (1994). Co-written and produced by O'Connor with John Reynolds and English musician, composer, and record producer Tim Simenon, the song also features a sample from "Dr. Jekyll" by Miles Davis. It was a top-30 hit in New Zealand and a top-40 hit in the Netherlands, but it did not chart in the UK. Reynolds told that the energy possessed by O'Connor's vocals on the track was almost impossible to contain, but they managed to trap it on tape somehow. He was nominated for Qs Producer of the Year award for the Universal Mother album. O'Connor performed the song in several TV shows, like Late Show with David Letterman and Later... with Jools Holland. Its accompanying music video was directed by French director Michel Gondry and received a nomination for a Grammy Award for Best Short Form Music Video in 1995.

== Chart performance ==
The song charted in Europe, Australia and New Zealand. In the Netherlands, its first entry on the Single Top 100 was at number 45 in September 1994. It peaked at number 36 and spent four weeks at the chart with number 46 as the last position in October. The song didn't reach the Dutch Top 40, but peaked at number two on the Tipparade. In Belgium, "Fire on Babylon" only charted in Flanders, peaking at number 43 in its first week on the Ultratop chart. The following week, it dropped down to number 49 before leaving the chart, with a total of two weeks on it.

In New Zealand, the song entered the top 30, peaking at number 29 in October 1994. It first time entered that chart at number 45, and the last entry was at number 36. In Australia, the song was a top-60 hit on the ARIA Charts, peaking at number 57 in November 1994.

== Critical reception ==
Peter Galvin from The Advocate wrote that on the song, O'Connor "launches into a hip hop-inflected antimother diatribe". Larry Flick from Billboard magazine said the singer "will continue to mend political fences with this genius, if not emotionally harrowing, slice of funk-rock". He stated that her voice "has never been more captivating, swerving around a jagged drum and restrained but spikey guitars. A wafting Hugel horn gives the track a surprisingly haunting context. Alternative programmers should get on this immediately." Kelly Collins from Columbia Daily Spectator felt it "displays O'Connor's fiery side, and the slick programming adds a powerful element to the number." Evelyn McDonnell from Entertainment Weekly found that she "cleverly probes the contradiction between mother-worshiping and mother-blaming", adding that "Fire on Babylon" has "flashes of passion". Michael R. Smith from The Daily Vault described it as an "angry statement song". Chuck Campbell from Knoxville News Sentinel said "the intensity of her arching vocals underscores the ominous bass loop". A reviewer from Lennox Herald complimented it as "very excellent".

Melody Maker called it "a dub-driven bulldozer of a tune", with O'Connor "sounding at once forlorn and furious." Dele Fadele from NME praised "Fire on Babylon" as "a startling tale of child-abuse that singes the nerve-endings." Neil Spencer from The Observer remarked its "vengeful neo-reggae". Orla Swift from Record-Journal named it a "fierce rocker". Siân Pattenden from Select commented, "She took my father from my life/Took my sister and brothers on. Welcome to Sinéad O'Connor's therapy. Sit back on the couch and listen, for she will tell you her woes." Joy Press from Spin wrote that it's "a harrowing, almost apocalyptic opener, O'Connor's voice stretched shrilly over a menacing bass as she bears witness to her own nightmares. Yet in the midst of this scorched war zone, the song momentarily ebbs into a dizzy, melodic oasis." Larry Nager from The Telegraph named it the "loudest" song on Universal Mother, adding that it "roars and O'Connor sings ambiguously about the biblical whore of Babylon, seemingly meaning the British Empire." LaTasha Natasha Diggs for Vibe said that here, the singer's "trademark wails and whines flow."

== Music video ==
The music video for "Fire on Babylon" was directed by French director Michel Gondry, who had previously directed the video for "Human Behaviour" for Björk and has also directed "Protection" for Massive Attack. "Fire on Babylon" was produced by Ingo Lezzi for Partizan and was made as a sombre and unsettling vision of O'Connor's childhood and was released on August 15. The video was nominated for a Grammy Award for Best Short Form Music Video in 1995.

In 2018, Matt Melis from Consequence wrote, "The trapdoor flipping of her home and spinning of her bedroom wall brilliantly use motion to demonstrate how much of that scared, little girl remains inside the adult O’Connor, but nothing screams Gondry more than the projected familial apparitions and memories that appear and fade throughout the video in the house’s backyard. As light and dark outside the window mark the passage of time and neighboring homes shift about all around the house in question, O’Connor’s existence remains stunted and haunted until she finally confronts her abusive past. Few videos compare 2 it."

== Legacy ==
Diffuser ranked "Fire on Babylon" number five in their list of "10 Best Sinead O'Connor Songs" in 2013, calling it a "reggae-inspired groove". They added further that "the vocal is haunting, and coupled with the subject matter, it's chill inducing." Following O'Connor's death in 2023, Slant Magazine ranked the song number eight in their list of "Sinéad O'Connor's 20 Greatest Songs", writing, "With her newly honed bel canto vocal, O’Connor attacks the operatic scales of "Fire on Babylon", mustering a religious-like conviction, while producer and ex-husband John Reynolds whips up a heady mix of reggae, trip-hop, squelching funk, and—why not?—a Miles Davis sample. It's one of the most galvanizing songs in O'Connor’s catalog, one of the few that marries her appetite for outspoken protest music with something that sounds like a proper radio single. The lyrics are as much an indictment of O'Connor's treatment by her mother as they are a radical cry to torch the systems of oppression she faced off against her whole life."

== Track listing ==
- Europe, CD single (1994)
1. "Fire on Babylon" — 5:12
2. "I Believe in You" — 5:41
3. "House of the Rising Sun" — 5:09
4. "Streets of London" — 4:10

== Charts ==
| Chart (1994) | Peak position |
|---|---|
| Australia (ARIA) | 57 |
| Belgium (Ultratop 50 Flanders) | 43 |
| Canada Top Singles (RPM) | 61 |
| Israel (Israeli Singles Chart) | 18 |
| Netherlands (Dutch Top 40 Tipparade) | 2 |
| Netherlands (Single Top 100) | 36 |
| New Zealand (Recorded Music NZ) | 29 |
