= The Lion and the Cobra =

1987 studio album by Sinéad O'Connor

Studio album by Sinéad O'Connor
- Released: 5 October 1987
- Recorded: 1986–1987
- Studios: Oasis Studios (Camden, London)
- Genres: Pop rock; art rock
- Length: 42:21
- Labels: Ensign; Chrysalis
- Producers: Sinéad O'Connor; Kevin Moloney

Sinéad O'Connor chronology
The Lion and the Cobra (1987)	I Do Not Want What I Haven't Got (1990)

Alternative cover
- North American cover art

Singles from The Lion and the Cobra
- 1. "Troy" Released: 19 October 1987; 2. "Mandinka" Released: 28 December 1987; 3. "I Want Your (Hands on Me)" Released: 18 April 1988

The Lion and the Cobra is the debut album by the Irish singer Sinéad O'Connor, released on 5 October 1987 by Ensign and Chrysalis Records. O'Connor recorded the album while in the later stages of pregnancy with her first child. The title of the album is from Psalm 91:13 "you will tread upon the lion and cobra", and the track "Never Get Old" opens with an Irish language recital of Psalm 91 by the singer Enya.

"I'm really proud of them," O'Connor remarked of the album's songs, and her reluctance to perform them, in 2005. "For a little girl to have written some of those songs… I wrote my songs as therapy, if you like. I don't go back to it. I don't want to go there emotionally. I haven't paid all this money for therapy for fucking nothing."

== Singles ==
The first single, "Troy", peaked at number 5 in the Netherlands and number 12 in Belgium. It was not a hit in Britain when it was released there in 1987.

The second single, "Mandinka," was a mainstream pop hit in the UK, peaking at number 17 in the singles chart in February 1988, and at number 6 in her native Ireland.

"I Want Your (Hands on Me)" was featured in the 1988 horror film A Nightmare on Elm Street 4: The Dream Master. It was used in a prominent character's death sequence, as well as the film's end credits. As the third single from the album in the UK (after "Troy" and "Mandinka"), it peaked at number 77 in May 1988. Two single remixes include rapping by MC Lyte not on the album version.

== Album artwork ==
The photograph of O'Connor on the original album cover was taken by former Haysi Fantayzee member Kate Garner. As O'Connor was heavily pregnant at the time of the photoshoot, Garner photographed her from the shoulders up, as per her record company's request.

In the 2022 documentary Nothing Compares, O'Connor recalled how the photograph was taken: "I was frozen like a rabbit in the headlights getting my picture taken. [They] put on the album and got me to scream along with the album, so that's why there's the picture of me [that] looks like I'm screaming."

The artwork for the United States and Canadian releases differed from that of the European edition, which O'Connor claimed was deemed "too aggressive" for that market.

== Critical reception ==
Professional ratings
Review scores
Source	Rating
AllMusic	4.5/5 stars
Christgau's Record Guide	A−
Encyclopedia of Popular Music	3/5 stars
Los Angeles Times	3/4 stars
Pitchfork	9.1/10
Rolling Stone	4/5 stars
The Rolling Stone Album Guide	4/5 stars
Slant Magazine	4/5 stars
Spin Alternative Record Guide	8/10
Sputnikmusic	5/5

The Lion and the Cobra received acclaim from music critics. In the UK, Neil Perry of Sounds awarded the album five stars out of five and stated, "I can think of no finer debut this year", and continued, "I challenge you to hear the voice and remain unmoved". Eleanor Levy of Record Mirror gave the album four and a half stars out of five and called it "a staggeringly strange and enticing LP", saying "From pain to pure joy, this is a truly remarkable album." In the NME, Michele Kirsch described the record as "a weird but pleasant surprise" and wrote how O'Connor "busies herself with the usual domestic hell atrocities" but "salvation comes in the form of unpredictable phrasing and strange little yelps of despair". Melody Maker's Ian Gittins commented that "the dynamics and randoms here aren't fully striking, can't cut loose, because the whole is essentially linear, straight ahead". He said the album was "a fine debut" which "rattles its cage but never quite escapes".

=== Accolades ===
In a write-up for Slant Magazine's list of the best albums of the 1980s, where it placed at number 46, Sal Cinquemani called The Lion and the Cobra "regal, majestic, and allegorical" and "one of the most electrifying debuts in rock history." It was ranked at number 44 on Pitchfork's 2018 list of the best 1980s albums, with Cameron Cook saying that its "themes of patriotism, sexuality, Catholicism, and social oppression set the stage for a career marked by a resolute sense of independence."

== Legacy ==
Since the death of Sinéad O'Connor in July 2023, The Lion and the Cobra has continued to be praised and appreciated by listeners old and new.

The first trailer of the 2024 film The Watchers features a clip of O'Connor's vocals from "Never Get Old".

The Irish singer Enya also quoted the words of her spoken part in "Never Get Old" in a tribute message.

== Accolades ==
O'Connor was nominated for Grammy Award for Best Female Rock Vocal Performance at the 31st Annual Grammy Awards.

== Commercial performance ==
The album charted worldwide, reaching number 27 in the United Kingdom and number 36 on the US Billboard 200.

== Track listing ==
All tracks are written by Sinéad O'Connor, except where noted.

The Lion and the Cobra track listing
No.	Title	Writer(s)	Length
1.	"Jackie"		2:28
2.	"Mandinka"		3:46
3.	"Jerusalem"	O'Connor, Ali McMordie, Mike Clowes, John Reynolds	4:20
4.	"Just Like U Said It Would B"	O'Connor, Steve Wickham	4:32
5.	"Never Get Old" (spoken-word intro by Enya)		4:39
6.	"Troy"		6:34
7.	"I Want Your (Hands on Me)"	O'Connor, Clowes, Reynolds, Rob Dean, Spike Holifield	4:42
8.	"Drink Before the War"		5:25
9.	"Just Call Me Joe"	O'Connor, Kevin Mooney, Leslie Winer	5:51

== Personnel ==
Credits adapted from the album's liner notes.

- Sinéad O'Connor – vocals, electric guitar, producer, audio mixing, arranger
- Marco Pirroni – electric guitar, acoustic guitar
- Richard "Spike" Holifield – bass guitar
- Rob Dean – electric guitar, acoustic guitar
- John Reynolds – drums, programming
- Mike Clowes – synthesizer, keyboards, string arrangement
- Kevin Mooney – guitar, bass guitar
- Gavyn Wright – orchestra director
- Enya – speaking part
- Leslie Winer – spoken words

Technical

- Kevin Moloney – producer, engineer, audio mixing
- Fachtna Ó Ceallaigh – audio mixing
- Terence Morris – mixing
- Lloyd Phillips – mixing
- Chris Birkett – mixing
- Jack Adams – mastering
- Kate Garner – photography
- Kim Bowen – photography
- John Maybury – art direction, cover art
- Steve Horse – art direction, cover art

== Charts ==
=== Weekly charts ===
1987–1988 weekly chart performance for The Lion and the Cobra
Chart (1987–1988)	Peak position
Australian Albums (ARIA)	37
Canada Top Albums/CDs (RPM)	17
Dutch Albums (Album Top 100)	4
Finnish Albums (The Official Finnish Charts)	27
German Albums (Offizielle Top 100)	52
New Zealand Albums (RMNZ)	4
Swedish Albums (Sverigetopplistan)	37
Swiss Albums (Schweizer Hitparade)	12
UK Albums (Official Charts)	27
US Billboard 200	36

2023 weekly chart performance for The Lion and the Cobra
Chart (2023)	Peak position
Belgian Albums (Ultratop Flanders)	21
Irish Albums (Official Charts)	23
UK Independent Albums (Official Charts)	31

=== Year-end charts ===
Year-end chart performance for The Lion and the Cobra
Chart (1988)	Position
Dutch Albums (Album Top 100)	40
US Billboard 200	95

== Certifications and sales ==
Certifications and sales for The Lion and the Cobra
Region	Certification	Certified units/sales
Canada (Music Canada)	Platinum	100,000^{^}
Netherlands (NVPI)	Gold	50,000^{^}
United Kingdom (BPI)	Gold	100,000^{^}
United States (RIAA)	Gold	500,000^{^}
Summaries
Worldwide	—N/a	2,500,000
^{^} Shipments figures based on certification alone.

== See also ==
- List of 1980s albums considered the best
