= You Made Me the Thief of Your Heart =

1994 single by Sinéad O'Connor

Single by Sinéad O'Connor

from the album In the Name of the Father: Original Soundtrack Album
- B-side: "The Father and His Wife the Spirit"
- Released: 7 February 1994
- Studio: STS (Dublin, Ireland)
- Length: 4:45
- Label: Island
- Songwriters: Bono; Gavin Friday; Maurice Seezer
- Producer: Tim Simenon

Sinéad O'Connor singles chronology
"Don't Give Up" (1993)	"You Made Me the Thief of Your Heart" (1994)	"Thank You for Hearing Me" (1994)

Audio
- "You Made Me the Thief of Your Heart" on YouTube

"You Made Me the Thief of Your Heart" is a song by Irish singer-songwriter Sinéad O'Connor, written by Bono, Gavin Friday and Maurice Seezer for the soundtrack to Jim Sheridan's film In the Name of the Father (1993). The song is produced by English musician Tim Simenon and does not appear on any of O'Connor's studio albums, but in 1997, it was included on her first compilation album, So Far... The Best Of. It was critically acclaimed and a top 5 hit in both Ireland and Poland, while peaking at number 19 in Finland and number 42 in the UK. On the Eurochart Hot 100, it reached number 43. The accompanying music video, featuring O'Connor in a prison, was directed by Sheridan and nominated for an award at the 1994 MTV Music Awards.

== Background and lyrics ==
Bono told NME in a 1994 interview, "We had this idea for a murder ballad, they go back to the 14th Century in Ireland. It's the story of a woman killing her lover in order to keep him, and yet it seemed right for the story. I've always felt that when you're writing for movies, to be literal is a mistake. You're better off trying to make a tangent." Gavin Martin of the magazine wrote, "O'Connor sings the song [...] reflecting on the pained story that has preceded, sealing the movie's mood of vigorous resolve and a hard-won emancipation. It's a full-blooded collaboration, O'Connor embracing the song and soothing old wounds." Another editor, Stephen Dalton, complimented Bono's "cold-but-clever words".

== Chart performance ==
The song charted throughout Europe, in Australia, New Zealand, and the US. In Finland and Ireland, it was a top-10 hit, peaking at number four in Ireland. In the UK, it both entered and peaked at number 42 in its first week, on 13 February 1994. It stayed for two weeks on that position, before dropping to 55 the third week. The last entry on the UK Singles Chart was at number 80 on 6 March. In Scotland, the song peaked at number 52 in its first week, before dropping to 84 and 88.

In Belgium, it charted in Flanders, peaking at number 34 in its first entry, with the last position at number 42 on 26 March, with a total of three weeks on the Ultratop chart. In the Netherlands, the song peaked at number nine on the Dutch Single Tip only. On the Eurochart Hot 100, it reached its best position as number 43 on 5 March. In New Zealand, it peaked within the top 30, at number 24 in April with a total of two weeks on the chart, while in Australia, it reached number 43, with three weeks within the ARIA Charts. In the US, "You Made Me the Thief of Your Heart" climbed to number 24 on the Billboard Alternative Songs chart.

== Critical reception ==
Larry Flick from Billboard magazine felt "You Made Me the Thief of Your Heart" is "her most powerful performance" since "Nothing Compares 2 U", noting that it "overflows with primal emotion", "complemented by icy-cool keyboards and a snakey drum pattern that would normally flood alternative, dance, and adventurous top 40 stations." Troy J. Augusto from Cashbox named it Pick of the Week, describing it as a "riveting performance" from O’Connor. He wrote that on this "raw, spine-tingling" track, "Sinead opens all of the emotional floodgates for this one, hitting vocal peaks not heard since she covered Prince's 'Nothing Compares 2 U'. Brittle keyboard flourishes, spacy rhythmic patterns and dramatic production (from Friday and Tim Simenon) make for a single that should, in a fair world, make serious noise at all rock, pop and college outlets. Of course, who said we live in a fair world?"

Kent Zimmerman from the Gavin Report constated, "As Bruce Springsteen did on the Philadelphia Soundtrack, O'Connor steals the show". Caroline Sullivan from The Guardian said it "is the troubled Irish singer at her most stunning. Her well-publicised antics have distracted attention from the fact that she can sing, and beautifully. Here, she puts her angst to good use on a tense, Celtic-fiddle-accented piece of pop. It's her best track since 'Nothing Compares 2 U'." Eric R. Danton for The Hartford Courant remarked its "moody melody". HMV named it Single of the Week. Chris Willman from L.A. Times felt it finds the singer "in her prettily tense mode", singing "a third insinuating big-beat ballad by the pair." A reviewer from Liverpool Echo noted that it "has plenty of Irish influence", stating that with Jah Wobble and Simenon both involved, "it also has a sharply contemporary feel which provides a good match for the traditional elements."

Alan Jones from Music Week said the singer "adds an engaging vocal" on the "folk-tinged" song. He also added, "In with a whisper and out with a scream, this atmospheric track [...] features a fine vocal and some sterling support from assorted fiddles, spoons, accordions and other instruments that emphasise its Celtic influences. Bono's writing credit should add weight." John Kilgo from The Network Forty wrote that O'Connor "again pulls at the heartstrings" with "this intense song". Another editor, Wendi Cermak, described it as a "dreamy ambient affair". NME considered it "another moody mover" along the lines of Björk's 'Play Dead', adding, "Distorted accordion and spoons, topped off with raw beats and Sinéad's voice give us an Irish take on 'Unfinished Sympathy'." Allan Detrich from Toledo Blade named it the "best cut" of the soundtrack album. He added that "her voice combined with rolling violins make the listener visualize green, rolling hills and rebels running through the streets of Dublin."

== Music video ==
The music video for "You Made Me the Thief of Your Heart" was directed by Irish director Jim Sheridan, who also directed In the Name of the Father. It was produced by Liam Cabot for Dreamchaser and released on 7 February 1994. At the 1994 MTV Music Awards, the video was nominated in the category for Best Video from a Film.

In the video, O'Connor is imprisoned. She is brought into a cell with a grid. A light bulb hangs from the ceiling. As she sits and sings, an elderly man looks to her through the window, but disappears into the open air shortly afterwards. A black raven comes and visits her outside the window. Occasionally small clips from the movie In the Name of the Father appear throughout the video. In other scenes, O'Connor is interrogated at a table surrounded by serious men pushing her to sign a paper. They then put a dead raven in front of her and she signs the paper. Back in the cell, sitting alone, the doors suddenly opens up and O'Connor walks out to freedom. It is the invisible man who has opened up to her. Walking through a forest, she sets a couple of white pigeons free. At the end, she watches them as they fly off into the sky.

== Track listing ==
- UK, CD single (1994)
1. "You Made Me the Thief of Your Heart" (7-inch edit) – 4:45
2. "You Made Me the Thief of Your Heart" (12-inch Stained mix) – 6:26
3. "You Made Me the Thief of Your Heart" (album instrumental version) – 5:49
4. "The Father and His Wife the Spirit" – 2:27

== Charts ==
Chart (1994)	Peak position
Australia (ARIA)	43
Belgium (Ultratop 50 Flanders)	34
Europe (Eurochart Hot 100)	43
Finland (Suomen virallinen lista)	19
Ireland (IRMA)	4
Israel (Israeli Singles Chart)	10
Netherlands (Single Top 100 Tipparade)	9
New Zealand (Recorded Music NZ)	24
Scotland (OCC)	52
UK Singles (Official Charts)	42
US Alternative Airplay (Billboard)	24

== Release history ==
Region	Date	Format(s)	Label(s)	Ref.
United Kingdom	7 February 1994	7-inch vinyl; 12-inch vinyl; CD; cassette	Island	
Australia	28 February 1994	CD; cassette	Island	
