= Westland Studios =

Recording studio in Dublin, Ireland

Coordinates: 53°20.662′N 6°14.905′W

- Trade name: Westland Studios
- Native name: Westland
- Traded as: Westland Studios Ltd, Westland Studios, Alwyn Walker T/A Westland Studios
- Industry: Audio
- Predecessor: Lombard Sound Studios
- Founded: 1985; 41 years ago in Dublin, Ireland
- Founders: Tom Costello, Brian Molloy
- Defunct: 2018
- Fate: closed 2018
- Key people: Tom Costello, Deirdre Costello, Brian Molloy, Alwyn Walker
- Services: Recording, Mixing, Film Set

Westland Studios was a recording studio located in Dublin, Ireland. Originally established in 1976 as Lombard Sound, the studio was refurbished and renamed Westland Studio in 1985. It closed in 2018.

== History ==
The studio opened in 1976 under the name Lombard Sound and was the first 2-inch 24-track studio in Ireland. Briefly it was named Miracle Studios (as seen on the credits of Horslips' 1977 album Aliens).

In 1984 the studios' board of directors disbanded the company and liquidated its equipment. Former Lombard Sound directors Tom Costello and Brian Molloy took over the studios' lease, rebuilding and expanding the studio, which they reopened the following year as Westland Studio. The first session in the new studio was with Bill Whelan, and the house engineer at the time was Daire Winston. Between 1985 and 2010 it was under the management of Tom Costello and his daughter Deirdre Costello.

Beginning in 2010 Westland Studios was leased out to producer and engineer Alwyn Walker. In 2018 the studio closed its doors due to rising rental costs in Dublin City. The rooms are currently used for podcast recordings by HeadStuff Podcast Network and for branded podcasts under the name "The Podcast Studios". Westland's former manager Alwyn Walker currently works as an online mix engineer.
