= Mandinka (song) =

1987 single by Sinéad O'Connor

Single by Sinéad O'Connor

from the album The Lion and the Cobra
- Released: 28 December 1987
- Studio: Oasis (Camden, London)
- Genre: Rock; post-punk; new wave
- Length: 3:46
- Label: Chrysalis
- Songwriter: Sinéad O'Connor
- Producers: Sinéad O'Connor; Kevin Moloney

Sinéad O'Connor singles chronology
"Troy" (1987)	"Mandinka" (1987)	"I Want Your (Hands on Me)" (1988)

Music video
- "Mandinka" on YouTube

Professional ratings
Review scores
Source	Rating
AllMusic	4/5 stars
Number One	4/5 stars

"Mandinka" is a song by Irish singer-songwriter Sinéad O'Connor, released as the second single from her debut album, The Lion and the Cobra (1987). The song peaked at number 17 on the UK singles chart and number six in Ireland. O'Connor performed it on Late Night with David Letterman, which was her first TV appearance in the US.

== Background ==
In an April 1988 interview with The Tech, O'Connor said: "Mandinkas are an African tribe. They're mentioned in a book called Roots by Alex Haley, which is what the song is about. In order to understand it you must read the book."

== Chart performance ==
The single "Mandinka" topped the dance chart, but the single was also a mainstream pop hit in the UK, peaking at number 17 on the UK singles chart, number six in O'Connor's native Ireland, number 24 in the Netherlands, number 26 in Belgium, number 18 in New Zealand, number 39 in Australia, and number 33 in Canada.

After O'Connor's death in July 2023, "Mandinka" appeared on the UK Singles Downloads Chart Top 100 at number 32.

== Critical reception ==
At the time of its release, Jerry Smith from Music Week wrote, "The striking talents of the rather formidable Sinead O'Connor are well showcased in this dynamic number from her The Lion and the Cobra LP, and its infectuous [sic], if unorthodox, nature deserved wide exposure." Steven Wells from NME stated that it's a "stark reminder that O'Connor is blessed with an amazing and unique voice". Max Bell from Number One wrote that her voice "is as striking as her looks while her scruff of the neck grabbing confidence makes you forget completely that you've no idea what a mandinka is." Another editor, Kate Davies, said, "Phewee. What a single. A veritable pot pourri of sounds and ideas. Sinead serenades, screams and strains all in the course of a few minutes." Roger Morton from Record Mirror felt the song "starts off with disturbingly 'Summertime Blues' style guitars and then weighs in with a worringly girlie vocal. It's not until the chorus, when Sinead gets out her impressive vocal claws, that you can hear what all the fuss is about." Sal Cinquemani from Slant noted its "indie-rock splendor". Sue Dando from Smash Hits opined that "this rasping, raw rock/punkesque thing is destined to be possibly the most absolutely brilliant single to never be a hit."

In a retrospective review for the AllMusic website, editor Stephen Thomas Erlewine described the song as "hard-rocking".

== Music video ==
The accompanying music video for "Mandinka" was in heavy rotation after debuting 24 January 1988 in 120 Minutes on MTV.

== Live performances ==
In 1988, O'Connor sang "Mandinka" on Late Night with David Letterman, which was her first US network television appearance. She also sang the song live at the 1989 Grammy Awards.

== Cover versions ==
In July 2023, shortly after O'Connor's death, Alanis Morissette and Foo Fighters paid tribute to her and covered the song at Fuji Rock Festival in Japan.

In November 2023, The Last Dinner Party covered the song when they appeared on Apple Music's London Sessions.

== Charts ==
1988 weekly chart performance for "Mandinka"
Chart (1988)	Peak position
Australia (Australian Music Report)	39
Belgium (Ultratop 50 Flanders)	26
Canada Top Singles (RPM)	33
Europe (European Hot 100 Singles)	65
Ireland (IRMA)	6
Netherlands (Dutch Top 40)	30
Netherlands (Single Top 100)	24
New Zealand (Recorded Music NZ)	18
UK Singles (Official Charts)	17
US Dance Club Songs (Billboard) Remix	14

2023 weekly chart performance for "Mandinka"
Chart (2023)	Peak position
UK Singles Downloads (Official Charts)	15
