= Troy (song) =

Song by Sinéad O'Connor (1987)

Single by Sinéad O'Connor

from the album The Lion and the Cobra
- B-side: "Still Listening"
- Released: 19 October 1987
- Recorded: 1986
- Studio: Oasis Studios (London, England)
- Length: 6:34
- Label: Chrysalis
- Songwriter: Sinéad O'Connor
- Producers: Sinéad O'Connor; Kevin Moloney

Sinéad O'Connor singles chronology
"Troy" (1987)	"Mandinka" (1987)

Music video
- "Troy" on YouTube

"Troy" is the debut single by Irish singer-songwriter Sinéad O'Connor, released in 1987 from her debut studio album The Lion and the Cobra.

Written by O'Connor, the title is a reference to the poem No Second Troy by William Butler Yeats. It was not a hit in Ireland or the United Kingdom upon its release, but it was popular in the Netherlands, reaching No. 5 on the Dutch Top 40 in 1988.

In 2002, a dance version of the song was released as "Troy (The Phoenix from the Flame)", becoming a top-ten hit on several international dance charts, including the US Dance Club Songs chart.

== Critical reception ==
AllMusic editor Stephen Thomas Erlewine noted in his review that songs like "Troy", "Jackie" and "Jerusalem" "are compelling because of their hushed, quiet intensity". Mark Richardson from Pitchfork described the song as an "epic and visceral psychodrama", adding it is "lushly orchestrated, painting the story of desire and betrayal on a wall-sized canvas". Sal Cinquemani from Slant wrote: "...the fierce melodrama of young love and betrayal is imbued with the surrounding violence in 'Troy,' the song's crumbling romance equated with the burning of the famous Greek city." He added the song "is, perhaps, the album's defining moment, exhibiting all of the traits—vulnerability, fury, conviction, theatricality—the infamously outspoken singer-songwriter would become known for in the years that followed". In the documentary Sinead O'Connor - Nothing Compares (2022), she explained that the song is about a traumatic experience during her childhood involving her mother.

== Music video ==
The video featured O'Connor, completely bald and covered with gold and silver body paint, singing to a background of moving images including flames. The building featured in several shots is on Montpelier Hill, just south of Dublin, known as the Hell Fire Club.

== Live performances ==
O'Connor sang "Troy" live only during the year after it was released until 2008, when she performed at the Night of the Proms in Belgium and the Netherlands. "In Dublin I was doing this show one night," she recalled, "and somebody yelled out, 'Troy, Troy.' And I went, I'm fucking troying."

== Charts ==
=== Weekly charts ===
Weekly chart performance for "Troy" (original version)
Chart (1987–1988)	Peak position
Belgium (Ultratop 50 Flanders)	12
Netherlands (Dutch Top 40)	5
Netherlands (Single Top 100)	8

Weekly chart performance for "Troy" (remix version)
Chart (2002)	Peak position
Belgium (Ultratop 50 Flanders)	35
UK Singles (Official Charts)	48
US Dance Club Songs (Billboard)	3

=== Year-end charts ===
Year-end chart performance for "Troy" (original version)
Chart (1988)	Position
Netherlands (Dutch Top 40)	79
