= John Reynolds (musician) =

Irish record producer

- Occupation: Musician
- Spouse: Sinéad O'Connor (m. 1989; div. 1991)
- Website: johnreynoldsproducer.com

John Reynolds is a record producer and musician.

== Biography and work ==
He was the first husband of singer Sinéad O'Connor; they had one child, Jake (b. 1987). Reynolds was formerly a drummer for the solo musician Jah Wobble. Reynolds met O'Connor and produced her first album, The Lion and the Cobra, in 1987, and has since collaborated on her albums I Do Not Want What I Haven't Got (1990); Universal Mother (1994), for which he was nominated as Q Producer of the Year; the Gospel Oak EP (1997); How About I Be Me (And You Be You)? (2012); and I'm Not Bossy, I'm the Boss (2014). He was also the drummer for O'Connor's band on her 2013 tour.

Reynolds produced the charity song "The Ballad of Ronnie Drew", featuring U2, The Dubliners, Kíla, and "A Band of Bowsies", which reached number one on the Irish singles chart. He has recently recorded Herbie Hancock, Indigo Girls, and Brian Eno.

In 2011, Reynolds produced the seventh Belinda Carlisle album, Voila, the album Lifelines by Andrea Corr, and, with Brian Eno, co-produced From Africa With Fury: Rise with Seun Kuti, son of Fela Kuti.

== Discography ==
Production credits include:

- Sinéad O'Connor – "Song to the Siren"
- The Chieftains and Moya Brennan – "Lullaby for the Dead"
- Damien Rice – "Under the Tongue"
- Liam Clancy featuring John Sheahan – "The Parting Glass"
- Orla Fallon and Moya Brennan – "Forgotten"
- Glen Hansard – "High Hope"
- Damien Dempsey – "Maasai Returns"
- Andrea Corr – "Oh Brother"
- Andy Irvine and Dónal Lunny – "Blacksmith"
- Paul Brady – "Dreams Will Come"
- Shane MacGowan and Moya Brennan – "You're the One"
- Anúna and Moya Brennan featuring Iarla Ó Lionáird – "Is Mise 'n Ghaoth/The Lass of Aughrim"
- Belinda Carlisle – "Voila"
- Screaming Orphans – "Life in a Carnival"
- Hattie Whitehead – "Bloom"
