= Surfin' Bird (album) =

- Cover of the 1964 LP by Garrett Records.

Studio album by The Trashmen
- Released: January 14, 1964
- Recorded: Kay Bank (Minneapolis, Minnesota)
- Genres: Surf rock, garage rock
- Label: Garrett
- Producer: George Garrett

Surfin' Bird is the debut studio album by the Trashmen, released on January 14, 1964. It was named after their novelty hit of the same name. The album peaked at No. 48 at the Billboard 200 chart.

The album was recorded at Kay Bank Studios and rushed to the stores to capitalize on the success of the "Surfin' Bird" single, released two months earlier. According to Rick Shefchik's book Everybody's Heard about the Bird, which chronicles the band's rise and fall, both the Surfin' Bird album and the single each went on to sell over a million copies. Richie Unterberger of AllMusic, who gave the album 4.5 stars out of 5, wrote that it "actually outstrips most of the Southern California-based competition, due to the ferocious grit of the playing and a vaguely demented, go-for-broke recklessness."

== 1964 LP release ==
Two editions are known to have an incorrect track list on the back of the sleeve – the track listing printed on the vinyl is correct, though. Interestingly, the erroneous track list was later used for the 1995 CD reissue (see below).

Side one
No.	Title	Writer(s)	Original artist	Length
1.	"Surfin' Bird"	Al Frazier, Carl White, Turner Wilson Jr., Sonny Harris	The Rivingtons	2:20
2.	"Misirlou"	Fred Wise, Milton Leeds, Nick Roubanis, Bob Russell	This version: Dick Dale	2:03
3.	"Money"	Berry Gordy, Janie Bradford	Barrett Strong	3:05
4.	"Tube City"	Steve Wahrer	original song	3:11
5.	"Kuk"	Bob Demmon, Dennis Linsey, Jim Gallagher, Rich Fifield, Jon Patterson	The Astronauts	2:03
6.	"It's So Easy"	Buddy Holly, Norman Petty	The Crickets	2:01

Side two
No.	Title	Writer(s)	Original artist	Length
7.	"King Of The Surf"	Larry LaPole	original song	2:25
8.	"Henrietta"	James "Jimmy" Dee Fore, Larry Hitzfeld	Jimmy Dee and The Offbeats	2:29
9.	"Malaguena"	Ernesto Lecuona	Ernesto Lecuona	2:31
10.	"My Woodie"	Larry LaPole	original song	1:47
11.	"Bird Bath"	Dal Winslow	original song	2:32
12.	"The Sleeper"	Larry LaPole	original song	2:29

The LP incorrectly credits the title track to Steve Wahrer, the band's drummer and vocalist. "Surfin' Bird" is actually a fusion of two songs by the Rivingtons: "The Bird's the Word" and "Papa-Oom-Mow-Mow". Following legal threats by the group, the song was re-attributed to all four members of the Rivingtons.

"Kuk" is a song originally by the Astronauts. For reasons unknown, some copies of the album credit Rich Fifield, but not Jon Patterson, while others credit Patterson, but not Fifield. The 1995 reissue has Fifield listed in the credits, not Patterson.

== 1995 CD reissue ==
In 1995, the album received an official CD reissue by Sundazed Music. This release uses a different track order, and also adds two demos, a B-side, and a single.

No.	Title	Writer(s)	Original artist	Length
1.	"Surfin' Bird"	Al Frazier, Carl White, Turner Wilson Jr., Sonny Harris	The Rivingtons	2:22
2.	"King Of The Surf"	Larry LaPole	original song	2:28
3.	"Henrietta"	James "Jimmy" Dee Fore, Larry Hitzfeld	Jimmy Dee and The Offbeats	2:33
4.	"Misirlou"	Fred Wise, Milton Leeds, Nick Roubanis, Bob Russell	This version: Dick Dale	2:07
5.	"Malaguena"	Ernesto Lecuona	Ernesto Lecuona	2:35
6.	"It's So Easy"	Buddy Holly, Norman Petty	The Crickets	2:04
7.	"Tube City"	Steve Wahrer	original song	3:20
8.	"My Woodie"	Larry LaPole	original song	1:54
9.	"Bird Bath"	Dal Winslow	original song	2:36
10.	"Kuk"	Bob Demmon, Dennis Linsey, Jim Gallagher, Rich Fifield	The Astronauts	2:04
11.	"Money"	Berry Gordy, Janie Bradford	Barrett Strong	3:10
12.	"Sleeper"	Larry LaPole	original song	2:32
13.	"Surfin' Bird (Demo Version)"	Al Frazier, Carl White, Sonny Harris, Turner Wilson Jr.	The Rivingtons	2:19
14.	"Bird Dance Beat (Demo Version)"	George Garrett	original song	2:06
15.	"Walkin' My Baby"	Dean Mathis, Marc Mathis	Allen Wayne	2:27
16.	"Dancin' With Santa"	Larry LaPole	original song	2:31

== 1990 CD compilation ==
A label called Request Record released a CD compilation also entitled Surfin' Bird in 1990. The first 12 tracks of the album comprise the original Surfin' Bird LP, in the same track order. The next 12 tracks are singles by the Trashmen. The last 2 tracks are "Cyclon"/"Sally-Jo", the A-side of a 1961 single by and the sole release of Jim Thaxter and the Travelers, a band which The Trashmen grew out of. The last 14 tracks were previously released on the 1965 compilation album Bird Dance Beat, so this 1990 release is essentially a bundling of the Surfin' Bird and Bird Dance Beat albums. It is technically the earliest known CD reissue of Surfin Bird, although it is likely unofficial.

== Personnel ==
The Trashmen:

- Tony Andreason – lead guitar
- Dal Winslow – rhythm guitar
- Robert Reed – bass guitar
- Steve Wahrer – drums, vocals

Production:

- George Garrett – producer
- Tom Jung – engineer
- Bill Diehl – liner notes
