= Tony Andreason =

American musician (born 1943)

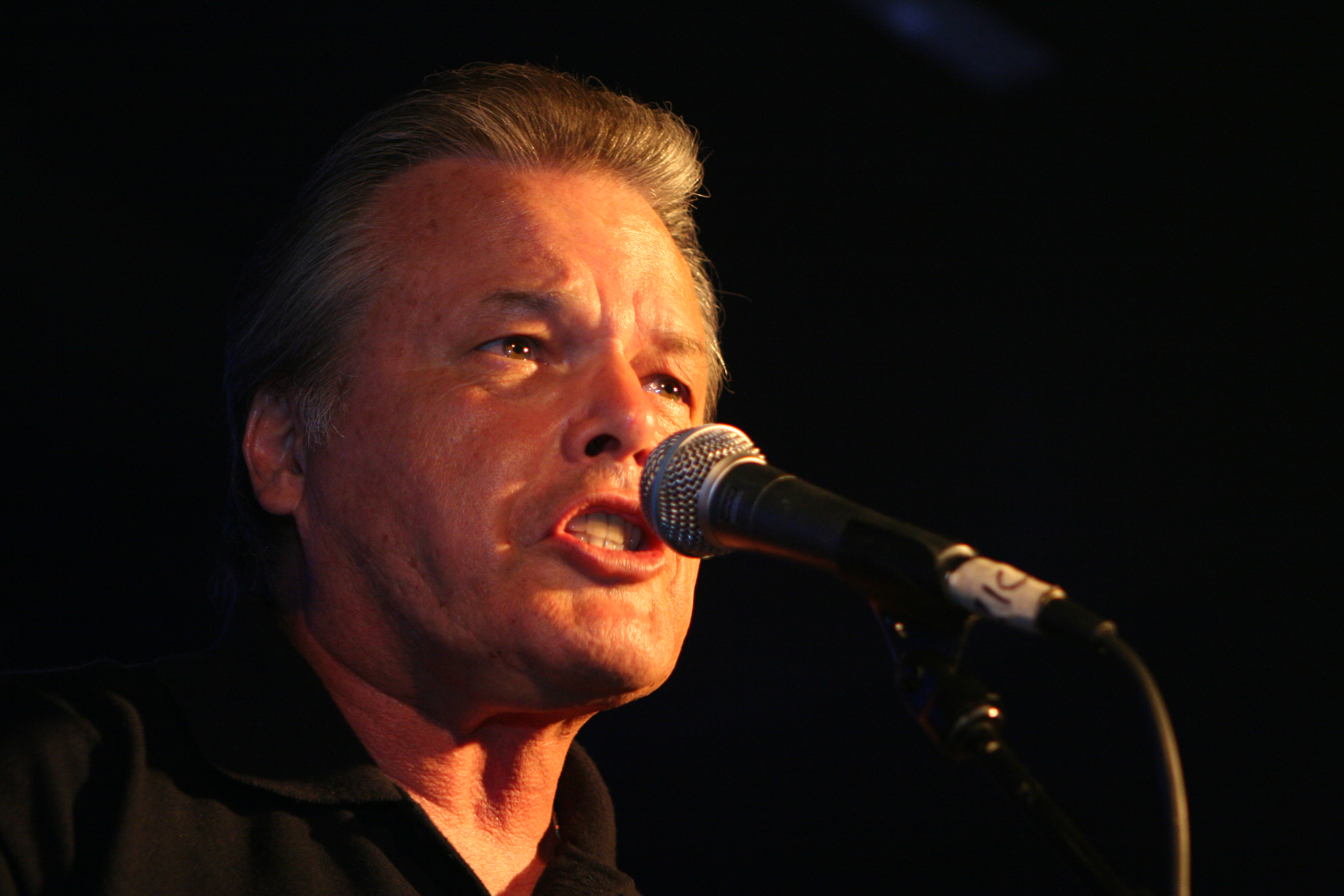
- Andreason performing live in 2008 with the Trashmen
- Born: Anthony Joseph Andreason; 1943 (age 82–83); Minneapolis, Minnesota
- Occupation: Musician
- Years active: 1962–present
- Works: The Trashmen, The Platte Valley Boys, The Surf Dawgs
- Musical career
- Genres: Rock; surf rock; bluegrass
- Instruments: Vocals; guitar
- Label: Soma

Anthony Joseph "Tony" Andreason (born 1943) is an American guitarist and vocalist, best known as the co-founder, lead guitarist, and co-lead vocalist of The Trashmen, who achieved popularity with the 1963 song "Surfin' Bird". He is also known as the guitarist for the Minneapolis bluegrass band the Platte Valley Boys and has performed regularly with the surf instrumental group the Surf Dawgs.

== Biography ==
Born in 1943 in Minneapolis, Andreason went to Patrick Henry High School, where he played in the school orchestra, and later studied at the McPhail School of Music. Around 1955, he met Mike Jann, and in 1957 the two won a Knights of Columbus talent contest in downtown Minneapolis, earning a session at Kay Bank Recording Studio where they recorded two country songs on acetate.

By 1959, Andreason had moved to rock and roll, playing lead guitar at teen dances with Jim Thaxter and the Travelers before serving in the military with Thaxter in 1961. After returning in early 1962, Andreason started the Trashmen with Dal Winslow, Steve Wahrer, and Bob Reed. In 1963, they recorded "Surfin' Bird" (combining The Rivingtons' "The Bird's the Word" and "Papa-Oom-Mow-Mow") at Kay Bank Studio, reaching No. 4 on the Billboard Hot 100 in early 1964. The song later appeared in Full Metal Jacket and Family Guy.

In 1966–1967, Andreason co-founded several independent Minneapolis labels, West Wind Records, Country Beat Records, and Peak Records with Mike Jann and songwriter Larry LaPole (who wrote the B-side "King of the Surf"), producing local country and rock acts such as Marilyn Sellars. He also produced records for local artists including South 40, Jokers Wild, and blues harmonica player Mojo Buford.

The Trashmen broke up in 1967 and got back together in the 1980s. In 1988, drummer Steve Wahrer, who shared lead vocals with Andreason, left the band due to health problems and died of throat cancer in January 1989. Andreason took over full lead vocals while his brother Mark Andreason joined on drums. The band later toured Europe before retiring from regular shows in 2016. On October 8, 2017, Andreason received the second annual Bill Diehl Lifetime Achievement Award in Minnesota.

Since 1997, Andreason has played guitar with the Minneapolis bluegrass group the Platte Valley Boys, formed in 1975 by Ron Colby, Jerry Lee, and Howard Pine. They were the first bluegrass band inducted into the Minnesota Music Hall of Fame and were inducted into the Minnesota Rock and Country Hall of Fame in 2007. Later lineups included founding banjo player Ron Colby, Scott Stebbins, Catie Jo Pidel, and Andreason.

Andreason has also played live with the Minneapolis surf band the Surf Dawgs and recorded with Deke Dickerson, including a guitar solo for Dickerson's band The Untamed Youth at the former Kay Bank Studio in October 2024.
