= Steve Wahrer =

American drummer (1941–1989)

Background information
- Born: Stephen Gary Wahrer; November 22, 1941; Keokuk, Iowa, U.S.
- Died: January 21, 1989 (aged 47) Robbinsdale, Minnesota, U.S.
- Genres: Surf rock; Garage rock; Rock and roll
- Occupation: Musician
- Instruments: Vocals; drums
- Years active: 1957–1988
- Labels: Soma, Garrett
- Formerly of: The Trashmen; The Citations; The String Kings; The Rave-Ons; The Trespassers; Jim Thaxter and the Travelers

Stephen Gary "Steve" Wahrer (November 22, 1941 – January 21, 1989) was an American drummer and singer who co-founded the rock band The Trashmen. He sang lead vocals on their 1963 hit "Surfin' Bird" and shared vocal duties with guitarist Tony Andreason.

== Early life ==
Stephen Gary Wahrer was born in Keokuk, Iowa, the son of Stephen Walter Wahrer (1922–1993) and Mariana Mae Wahrer (née Strube, 1923–1969). His immediate family also included his two sisters, Vicky Ann (née Wahrer) Zander and Susan "Sue" (née Wahrer) Schumacher (later McCasland).

Growing up in Keokuk, he went by his middle name Gary and attended Keokuk Junior High School. In 1955, at age 13, he was a bat boy for the champion minor league baseball team, the Keokuk Kernels, where he was nicknamed "Whitey" due to his very light blonde hair. Prior to his freshman year of high school, his family relocated to Robbinsdale, Minnesota, where he attended Robbinsdale High School and began using the name Steve.

== Career ==
In 1957, Wahrer met rhythm guitarist Dal Winslow and lead guitarist Tony Andreason at the Crystal Coliseum in Minneapolis, and the three played briefly alongside a saxophonist as The String Kings. Soon after, they formed Jim Thaxter and the Travelers with singer-guitarist Jim Thaxter and pianist Tom Diehl, performing at venues such as the Crystal Coliseum, Bill's Roller Rink in Anoka, and private parties at Theodore Wirth Golf Course. In 1960, the group recorded two songs—"Sally Jo" and "Cyclone"—in Thaxter's living room, with Wahrer providing backing vocals on "Sally Jo". After Thaxter and Andreason entered military service in spring 1961, Wahrer played drums and sang lead vocals with the Anoka-based band The Trespassers until early 1962, when he rejoined Thaxter's group.

In early 1962, Wahrer, Andreason, and Winslow left Thaxter following musical disagreements and formed a new band with bassist Don Woody (soon replaced by Bob Reed). After hearing local musician Kai Ray's 1961 single "Trashman's Blues", Wahrer established the band's name by arriving at a school dance at Brooklyn Center High School with "The Trashmen" painted on his bass drum head. While the band initially performed mostly instrumentals, Wahrer took over lead vocals on covers such as Del Shannon's "Runaway".

In 1963, after seeing the Sorenson Brothers perform "The Bird's the Word" in Amery, Wisconsin, Wahrer began experimenting in the back room of Chubb's Ballroom in Maple Grove, combining "The Bird's the Word" and "Papa-Oom-Mow-Mow" by The Rivingtons. To catch his breath while singing the intense track several times a night, he invented the song's gibberish middle vocal section, and cued live chord changes by nodding his head from behind the drum kit. After local DJ Bill Diehl urged them to record the song—and deemed an initial basement take at George Garrett's Nic'o'Lake Records too long—the band recorded a shorter version at Kay Bank Studio in Minneapolis, where Wahrer sang facing Andreason and recorded the vocals in two halves spliced together.

Released in November 1963, "Surfin' Bird" reached No. 4 on the Billboard Hot 100 on January 25, 1964. Early pressings credited Wahrer as the writer, though songwriting credits were reassigned to the four members of The Rivingtons (Al Frazier, Carl White, Sonny Harris, and Turner Wilson Jr.) after the group threatened legal action. Despite the reassignment, Wahrer continued to appear in composer credits on later reissues and covers by bands such as The Cramps and Sodom. On the Surfin' Bird album, the instrumental "Tube City" was also credited to Wahrer despite having been written by Andreason, while Wahrer wrote "Real Live Doll", the B-side to the band's 1965 single "Dancin' with Santa".

On January 4, 1964, Wahrer appeared alone on American Bandstand to lip-synch "Surfin' Bird" because the program declined to pay travel costs for the entire band. Given no advance preparation and unaccustomed to performing out front without his drums, he improvised the "Bird" dance on the spot before an out-of-breath interview with host Dick Clark; Andreason later remarked that the appearance did not reflect Wahrer's actual abilities as a singer and drummer. Wahrer was also a close friend of Miriam Linna, founder of The Cramps.

== Personal life and death ==
Wahrer married Lucille Margaret Aanonson on December 21, 1963; they later divorced. He married LaVonne Barbara Boehnen on December 21, 1971, and they divorced in February 1980. Wahrer had no children.

After the Trashmen disbanded in 1967, Wahrer remained in the Twin Cities, playing with various local acts and backing regional country singer Betty Rydell. He participated in Trashmen reunions beginning in the 1980s, performing with the group until roughly a year before his death. Wahrer died of throat cancer on January 21, 1989, at North Memorial Hospital in Robbinsdale, Minnesota, at the age of 47. Following his death, Tony Andreason's brother Mark joined on drums, and Tony Andreason learned to imitate Wahrer's vocal delivery so the band could continue performing "Surfin' Bird" live.
