= Paul Peterson =

American musician

- Also known as: St. Paul Peterson
- Born: Paul Joseph Peterson; October 18, 1964 (age 61); Minneapolis, Minnesota, U.S.
- Genres: Rock; soul; funk; pop; alternative dance
- Occupations: Singer; musician
- Instruments: Keyboards; vocals; guitar; bass; drums
- Years active: 1983–present
- Labels: Paisley Park; Warner Bros.; MCA; Atlantic; Ropeadope; Sony RED
- Website: paulpeterson.com

Paul Joseph Peterson (born October 18, 1964), also known as St. Paul Peterson, is an American singer and musician best known for his memberships in the bands the Family and the Time.

== Life and career ==
Born in Minneapolis, Minnesota, Peterson was the youngest son in a musical family. He was discovered by Prince in 1983 and groomed to replace Monte Moir as keyboardist of R&B band the Time. Peterson gained exposure when the band appeared in the hit film Purple Rain.

When the Time broke up in 1984, Prince gathered the remnants to form the Family, with Peterson as lead singer. The group's tenure was brief, releasing a self-titled album (with the original version of "Nothing Compares 2 U") and performing live only once (at First Avenue, where Purple Rain was filmed). Peterson left to pursue a solo career, releasing his eponymous debut album in 1987. Peterson released two singles, "Intimacy" and "Rich Man" from the album, as well as a video for the latter one. Prince wrote a song about Peterson's early departure from the Family called "Dream Factory", which was later released on 1998's Crystal Ball compilation. Peterson released two solo albums in the 1990s on Atlantic Records and a live recording with the group the Minneapolis All-Stars. His last solo album, Everything, was released in 2003.

Peterson is also a session musician and has backed up many bands and singers in their tours. In the late 1980s to early 1990s, Peterson toured as a member of the Steve Miller Band. He has also toured with Kenny Loggins, Oleta Adams and most recently Peter Frampton. In 1990, he released a song, "Every Heart Needs a Home", on the Teenage Mutant Ninja Turtles soundtrack. From 1998 to 2000, he was the bassist in the house band on the Donny & Marie TV program. He was the Program Chair for the Audio and Recording arts at Minneapolis Media Institute until leaving in June 2016 to tour with Peter Frampton as a bass player.

Peterson produced two songs and co-produced two more songs on Oleta Adams' 2009 album, Let's Stay Here. He also played on the album, which was released on April 21, 2009.

In June 2011, Peterson and three other members of the Family reunited as fDeluxe and released a record called Gaslight in September 2011. Since then, fDeluxe has released RELIT, and most recently AM Static, a collection of covers done in the classic fDeluxe style.

In 2017, St. Paul rekindled his band St. Paul and the Minneapolis Funk All Stars, toured in Australia in 2018 playing two shows at the Sydney Opera House with the show titled "Nothing Compares 2 Prince". He also played concerts for the Minnesota Timberwolves, the Minnesota Vikings and in 2019 played the Thunder Bay Blues Festival.

In 2018, St. Paul started releasing new music under his own name again, beginning with "You Got 2 Love".

In 2024, Peterson was a part of a sold-out concert in Minnesota, celebrating what would have been Prince's 66th birthday, with whom he had collaborated.

== Personal life ==
Peterson is married and has two children, and resides in the Minneapolis area. Peterson's daughter Taylor (under the name Jeanne Taylor), released her debut EP Jeanne on November 12, 2016.

== Discography ==
=== Albums ===
==== Solo ====
- St. Paul (1987)
- Down to the Wire (1990)
- Blue Cadillac (1996)
- Everything (2003)
- Break on Free (2022)

==== Collaborations ====
- Ice Cream Castle — with the Time (1984)
- The Family — with the Family (1985)
- A Child Is Born — with the Petersons (1997)
- Live at the Quest — with the Minneapolis Allstars (1998)
- My Calendar — with Jeanne Arland Peterson (2000)
- A Compilation — with the Peterson Family (2003)
- Let's Stay Here — with Oleta Adams (2009) (session musician, producer and co-producer, US touring band)
- Gaslight — with fDeluxe (2011)
- Relit — with fDeluxe (2012)
- AM Static — with fDeluxe (2014)
- Soul Renegade — with Ken Valdez (2017)

=== Singles ===
Year	Single	Peak chart positions		
Year	Single	US R&B	US Pop	UK
1987	"Rich Man"	32	—	―
1988	"Intimacy"	—	―	84
1990	"Every Heart Needs a Home"	—	―	—
1990	"Stranger to Love"	―	52	―
2011	"Drummers and Healers" (with fDeluxe)	—	—	―
2011	"Gaslight" (with fDeluxe)	—	—	―
2012	"Over the Canyon" (with fDeluxe)	—	—	―
2012	"You Got What You Wanted" (with fDeluxe)	―	—	―
2018	"You Got 2 Love"	—	—	―
"—" denotes releases that did not chart or were not released in that territory.
