= James Leary =

James Leary may refer to:

- James Leary (musician) (1946–2021), American double bass player and arranger/composer
- James C. Leary (born 1973), American actor
- James P. Leary, American folklorist
- James Leary, character in Vanishing on 7th Street
