= Soma Records =

Soma Records may refer to:

- Soma Records (UK label), a Scottish record label specialising in techno and house music
- Soma Records (U.S. label), an American record company
