= Married to the Mob (soundtrack) =

Soundtrack album
- Released: 1988
- Length: 37:22
- Label: Reprise

Singles from Married to the Mob
- 1. "Liar, Liar" Released: 1988; 2. "Jump in the River" Released: October 1988

Professional ratings
Review scores
Source	Rating
AllMusic	4/5 stars

Married to the Mob is the soundtrack album to the 1988 film Married to the Mob. It features early songs by Sinéad O'Connor and Chris Isaak as well as a Brian Eno cover of William Bell's soul classic "You Don't Miss Your Water".

== Track listing ==
Music from the Film Married to the Mob
No.	Title	Writer(s)	Producer(s)	Length
1.	"Jump in the River" (Sinéad O'Connor)	Sinéad O'Connor	Sinéad O'Connor; Marco Pirroni	4:03
2.	"Bizarre Love Triangle" (New Order)	Gillian Gilbert; Peter Hook; Stephen Morris; Bernard Sumner	Gillian Gilbert; Peter Hook; Stephen Morris; Bernard Sumner; Stephen Hague	3:56
3.	"Suspicion of Love" (Chris Isaak)	Chris Isaak	Erik Jacobsen	3:59
4.	"Liar, Liar" (Debbie Harry)	James Donna; Denny Craswell	Mike Chapman	4:01
5.	"Time Bums" (Ziggy Marley and the Melody Makers)	Ziggy Marley	Chris Frantz; Tina Weymouth	4:37
6.	"Devil Does Your Dog Bite?" (Tom Tom Club)	Chris Frantz	Chris Frantz; Tina Weymouth	3:40
7.	"Goodbye Horses" (Q Lazzarus)	William Garvey	Q Lazzarus; William Garvey	3:08
8.	"Queen of Voudou" (Voodooist Corporation)	Steve Breck; Stuart Argabright; William Barg	Steve Breck; Stuart Argabright; William Barg	3:39
9.	"Too Far Gone" (The Feelies)	Glenn Mercer; Bill Million	Glenn Mercer; Bill Million; Steve Rinkoff	3:32
10.	"You Don't Miss Your Water" (Brian Eno)	William Bell	Brian Eno	3:47

== Charts ==
Chart (1988)	Peak position
U.S. Billboard 200	197
