= Cuca Records =

American independent record label

Cuca Records was an American independent record label, of Sauk City, Wisconsin, United States, founded by James Kirchstein in 1959 and actively producing LP and 45 rpm recordings until the early 1970s. During this period, Cuca recorded and released primarily polka and ethnic music on LP, but also issued other musical styles, including pop, rhythm and blues, folk, and traditional jazz. Most musicians recorded by Cuca were from Wisconsin or adjacent states. Consequently, Cuca's recorded documents represent a focused view of Wisconsin musical performance during these years.

The Cuca studios recorded performers for commercial release on other popular record labels, as well. Its recording of "Mule Skinner Blues" by The Fendermen (Cuca 1003, rereleased as a 45 rpm on the Soma label) rose to number five on the Billboard charts in 1960 and sold over a million copies, and its recording of Birdlegs and Pauline's tune, "Spring" (Cuca 1125, re-released on the Vee-Jay label) rose to number 18 on the rhythm and blues chart. Other musicians recorded by Cuca include bluesman Earl Hooker, the pop group Corporation, country musician Pee Wee King, and jazz musician Doc DeHaven. Cuca, which adopted the slogan "World's Largest Line of Old Time Music," was known for the host of polka and ethnic musicians, including Alvin Styczynski, Verne Meisner, Syl Liebl, the Goose Island Ramblers, John Check, Jerry Goetsch, Roger Bright, and the Edelweiss Stars.

Citation Records was founded as a division of Cuca. It signed Paul Stefen and the Royal Lancers, who achieved local success with many of their singles, including their cover of The Crickets' "I Fought the Law".

The Cuca Records Collection forms part of the Wisconsin Music Archives, a non-circulating special collection in the Mills Music Library at the University of Wisconsin–Madison.

== See also ==
- List of record labels
