= The Family (band) =

American pop band formed by Prince

- Also known as: fDeluxe
- Origin: Minneapolis, Minnesota, U.S.
- Genres: Minneapolis sound
- Years active: 1984–1985; 2003 (one-off reunion); 2011–present
- Label: Paisley Park/Warner Bros.
- Spinoff of: The Time
- Members: Eric Leeds; Susannah Melvoin; St. Paul
- Past members: Jerome Benton; Jellybean Johnson
- Website: fdeluxe.com

The Family is a band formed by Prince, and one of the first on Prince's record label, Paisley Park Records. The band reformed as fDeluxe in 2009. This band is not to be confused with a 1970s Minneapolis R&B band of the same name.

== History ==
The band's origins started with the disintegration of The Time in 1984. Lead singer Morris Day had left the band to pursue a solo career and guitarist Jesse Johnson became the de facto band leader. Prince suggested restructuring the band with new member Paul Peterson to head the group, but Johnson opposed. A few of the Time's newer members followed Johnson to join his backing band (called Jesse Johnson's Revue).

As The Time had served as an outlet for Prince to release more music, he wanted to continue this avenue, presenting the remaining members of the Time, Jellybean Johnson, Jerome Benton, and Paul Peterson, with his new project. They agreed to become a new band called the Family, with Peterson renamed "St. Paul" as the frontman and bassist. Johnson and Benton reprised their familiar roles from the Time. Prince added Susannah Melvoin, the twin sister of Revolution guitarist Wendy Melvoin, as a backing singer and keyboardist. The fifth member was Eric Leeds, the brother of Prince's tour manager Alan Leeds, who provided saxophone and flute. Also joining was bassist Allen Flowers. Guitarist Miko Weaver, from Sheila E.'s band, is credited in the album credits because he was to be a session and tour player, but was never officially a member of the band.

Much like the Time, the band's material was composed entirely by Prince, with the exception of "River Run Dry", which was written by Revolution drummer Bobby Z. Prince wrote and performed all the other tracks and simply overdubbed Peterson's and Melvoin's vocals and added Leeds' saxophone and flute. On several tracks, Prince's vocals can be clearly heard. Some of the original demos have surfaced as bootlegs and circulate among fans with Prince's original lead vocals, as well as two outtakes: the instrumental "Feline" and the pop "Miss Understood". As on other associates' albums, Prince falsely gave writing credit to the various band members, though he kept his name on "Nothing Compares 2 U". The tracks were all recorded in a span of a few weeks at the end of 1984 after Prince had finished sessions for Around the World in a Day and just before he started recording for Sheila E.'s album Romance 1600 and his own Parade album.

=== Album ===
The album itself is a mix of uptempo funk songs ("High Fashion", "Mutiny"), unconventional soul ballads ("Nothing Compares 2 U", "Desire"), jazz-funk instrumental tracks ("Yes", "Susannah's Pajamas") and New Wave songs ("The Screams of Passion", "River Run Dry"). "The Screams of Passion" was released as the first single from the album. MTV placed the video for the song in light rotation. "High Fashion" was the second single, but no video was made.

The album sold poorly upon its release and has been out of print in any form since the late 1980s in the United States. A compact disc version was released in Germany during the early 1990s following the success of Sinéad O'Connor's cover version of "Nothing Compares 2 U" which was released that same year and is highly valued among Prince fans and collectors.

Prince often incorporated the track "Mutiny" into the set list of his Parade Tour in 1986, which occasionally was extended to contain the chorus of his song "Dream Factory" and the snarky chant "St. Paul – punk of the month!" (due to his annoynance of Peterson's decision to depart) as well as on subsequent tours. From 1990 onward, Prince occasionally added "Nothing Compares 2 U" to his tour setlist.

=== Breakup ===
After the band performed a single concert, released its self-titled album and only two singles, Peterson felt constricted by Prince's control and opted to pursue his own career. Without a lead singer, Prince lost interest and absorbed most of the remaining members into the expanded Revolution, with the exception of Johnson, who went on to join the Flyte Tyme music production team of Jimmy Jam and Terry Lewis.

=== Reformation and fDeluxe ===
According to St. Paul's website, he fondly remembers his time with the Family and often plays songs from the album in concert. The Family reunited on December 13, 2003, for a single performance for charity along with other acts formerly associated with Prince. On January 26, 2007, the Family announced that it was returning to the music scene with a tour and a recording of new music. Now called fDeluxe, the band reformed in 2009 and released an album titled Gaslight (2011) with four of the five original members performing.

== Band members ==
=== Current members ===
- Eric Leeds – saxophone, flute (1984–1985, 2003, 2011–present)
- Susannah Melvoin – vocals (1984–1985, 2003, 2011–present)
- St. Paul – vocals, keyboards (1984–1985, 2003, 2011–present)

=== Past members ===
- Jerome Benton – background vocals (1984–1985, 2003)
- Jellybean Johnson – drums (1984–1985, 2003, 2011–2025)

=== Additional members ===
- Greg Brooks – backing vocals (1985)
- Bill Carrothers – keyboards (1985)
- Allen Flowers – bass (1985)
- Jonathan Melvoin – keyboards (1985)
- Wally Safford – backing vocals (1985)
- Miko Weaver – backing vocals, guitar (1985)

== Discography ==
=== Studio albums ===
Year	Album	Peak chart positions		
Year	Album	US	US R&B	US Gospel
1985	The Family	62	17	23
2011	Gaslight (as fDeluxe)	—	—	—
2014	AM Static (as fDeluxe)	—	—	—
"—" denotes releases that did not chart.

=== Live albums ===
- Live & Tight (As a Funk Fiends Fix) (2013) (as fDeluxe)

=== Remix albums ===
- Relit (2012) (as fDeluxe)

=== Singles ===
Year	Single	Peak chart positions			
Year	Single	US Pop	US R&B	US Dance	AUS
1985	"The Screams of Passion"	63	9	10	73
1985	"High Fashion"	—	34	—	—
2011	"Drummers and Healers" (as fDeluxe)	—	—	—	—
2011	"Gaslight" (as fDeluxe)	—	—	—	—
2012	"Over the Canyon" (as fDeluxe)	—	—	—	—
2012	"You Got What You Wanted" (as fDeluxe)	—	—	—	—
"—" denotes releases that did not chart or were not released in that territory.
