= Liar, Liar (The Castaways song) =

1965 single by The Castaways

Single by the Castaways
- B-side: "Sam"
- Released: 1965
- Recorded: March 2, 1965
- Studio: Kay Bank (Minneapolis, Minnesota)
- Genre: Garage rock; proto-punk
- Length: 1:55
- Label: Soma
- Songwriters: Jim Donna; Dennis Craswell
- Producer: Timothy D. Kehr

The Castaways singles chronology
"Liar, Liar" (1965)	"Goodbye Babe" (1965)

Music video
- The Castaways – "Liar Liar" on YouTube

"Liar, Liar" is a song written by Jim Donna and Dennis Craswell. It was originally recorded by American garage rock band the Castaways in 1965. It reached number 12 on the Billboard Hot 100.

== History ==
"Liar, Liar" was written by Jim Donna on a napkin in his parents' house. Drummer Dennis Craswell and Donna's sister Joanne helped Donna write it. It was completed in 2 hours. Donna and Craswell took it to the other members of The Castaways and they liked it. The song was recorded on March 2, 1965. It was presented to Soma Records founder and President Amos Heilicher, who also liked it and signed The Castaways to a contract.

"Liar, Liar" was the first and only hit single by the Castaways. The record peaked at number 12 on Billboard's Hot 100 in 1965 during a then-lengthy 14-week chart run. It reached the Top Ten in markets in every month between June and December 1965, including number 1 positions in Minneapolis/St. Paul, San Diego, Los Angeles, Seattle, Oklahoma City, Pittsburgh and St. Louis. The producer for the track was Timothy D. Kehr. Guitarist Robert Folschow contributed the distinctive falsetto vocal on "Liar, Liar," while Dick Roby did the scream on the song.

The Castaways performed "Liar, Liar" in the 1967 beach party film It's a Bikini World. The song also appears on the 1972 compilation album Nuggets: Original Artyfacts from the First Psychedelic Era, 1965–1968. It also appeared in the movies Lock, Stock and Two Smoking Barrels and Good Morning, Vietnam.

== Debbie Harry version ==
"Liar, Liar"

Single by Debbie Harry

from the album Married to the Mob
- Released: 1988
- Recorded: 1988
- Genre: Rock and roll
- Length: 3:01
- Label: Reprise
- Songwriters: James Donna; Denny Craswell
- Producer: Michael Chapman

Debbie Harry singles chronology
"In Love with Love" (1987)	"Liar, Liar" (1988)	"I Want That Man" (1989)

"Liar, Liar" was recorded by American singer Debbie Harry for the soundtrack to the 1988 film Married to the Mob and produced by Mike Chapman. It was their first collaboration since the 1982 Blondie album The Hunter. The following year, the two would team up again for Harry's album Def, Dumb and Blonde. A music video, co-directed by Adam Bernstein, was produced to promote the single. The song debuted and peaked at number 14 on Billboard's Modern Rock Tracks chart for the week ending September 10, 1988.

=== Track listings ===
- 7-inch single

A. "Liar, Liar" – 3:01
B. "Queen of Voudou" (performed by the Voodooist Corporation) – 3:39

- 12-inch single

A. "Liar, Liar" (extended version) – 5:45
B1. "Liar, Liar" (7″ version) – 3:01
B2. "Liar, Liar" (instrumental) – 4:50

== Charts ==
Chart performance for "Liar, Liar" (the Castaways version)
Chart (1965)	Peak position
US Billboard Hot 100	12

Chart performance for "Liar, Liar" (Debbie Harry version)
Chart (1988)	Peak position
US Alternative Airplay (Billboard)	14
