= The Trashmen =

American rock band

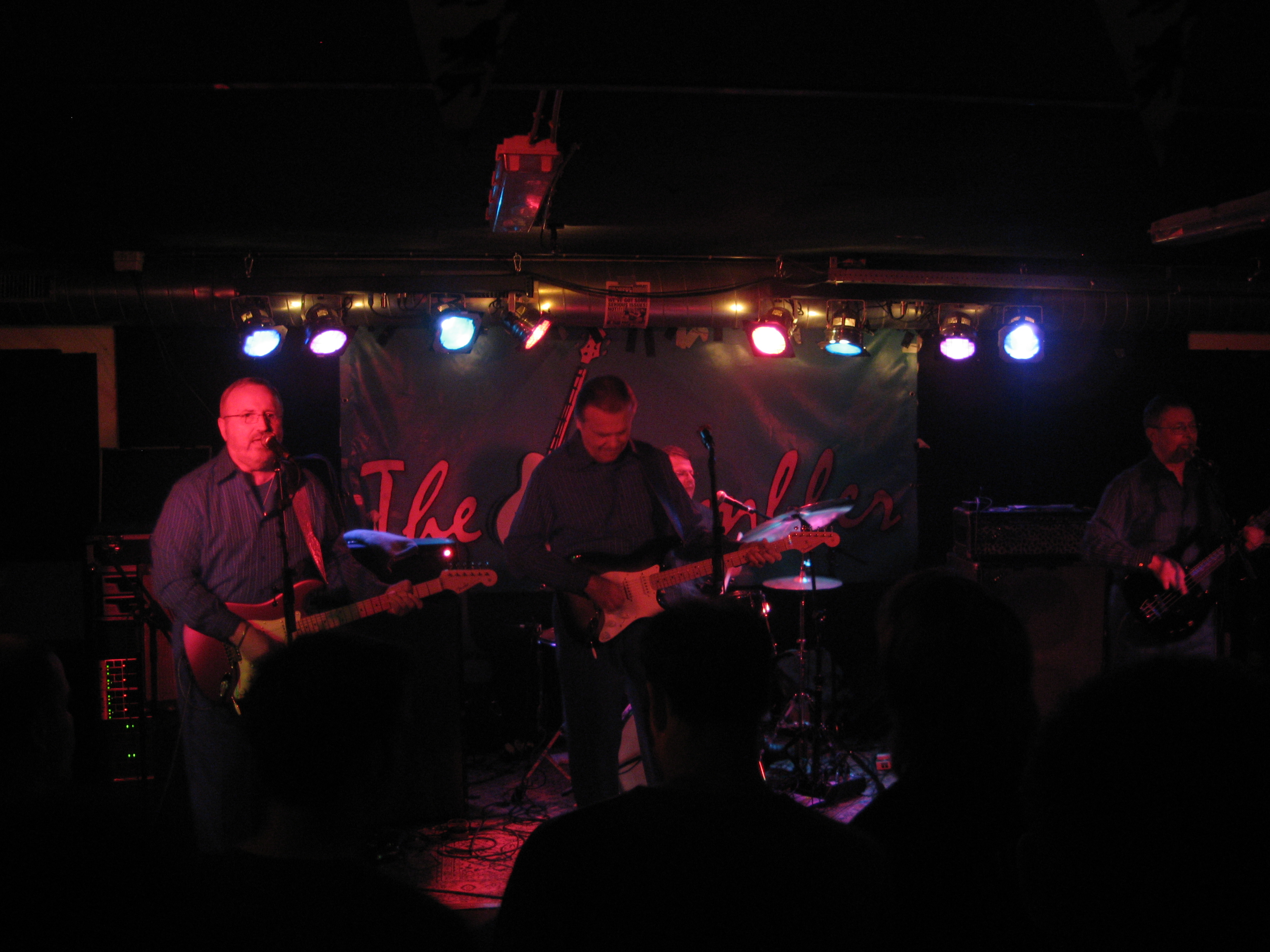
- The Trashmen live in 2008

Background information
- Origin: Minneapolis, Minnesota
- Genres: Surf rock; garage rock; proto-punk; Rock and roll
- Years active: 1962–1967, 1982–2016
- Labels: Garrett, Soma, Sundazed, Major Label
- Past members: Steve Wahrer; Mark Andreason; Tony Andreason; Dal Winslow; Bob Reed; Robin Reed

The Trashmen were an American surf rock band formed in Minneapolis in 1962 and are best known for their biggest hit, 1963's "Surfin' Bird", which reached No. 4 on the Billboard Hot 100. The original line-up of the group featured guitarists Tony Andreason and Dal Winslow, bassist Bob Reed, and drummer Steve Wahrer.

Along with Colorado-based contemporaries the Astronauts, the Trashmen have been described as "the premier landlocked Midwestern surf group of the '60s." The band took their name from "Trashman's Blues", a song written and recorded in 1961 by Minneapolis musician Kai Ray (Richard Caire, 1935–2017), who later wrote songs for the band.

== History ==
=== Pre-Trashmen ===
Tony Andreason and Mike Jann were friends who learned and played guitar together, starting in 1955. They primarily played country music. In 1957, at the Crystal Coliseum, Tony and Mike met drummer Steve Wahrer (who was born in Keokuk, Iowa, and lived there until his family relocated to Minnesota prior to his freshman year of high school; while in Iowa, he worked as a bat boy for the 1955 champion minor league baseball team Keokuk Kernels), Dallas "Dal" Winslow, a guitar player, and a saxophone player. Tony, Steve, Dal, and the saxophone player played as The String Kings for a brief time period. Mike Jann was not part of the group, due to his primary interest in country music.

Tony met Jim Thaxter through Steve and Dal. Jim was a singer who was looking to front a band. "Jim Thaxter and the Travelers" was then formed with the following line-up: Jim Thaxter on lead vocals and guitar (tuned to a bass register); Tony Andreason on lead guitar; Dal Winslow on rhythm guitar; Tom Diehl on piano; and Steve Wahrer on drums. In Spring 1961, the group took a hiatus as Tony and Jim had to enter military service, during which time Wahrer briefly played with Anoka-based band The Trespassers. In early 1962, Tony and Jim returned from their duties, but disagreements on musical direction caused Tony to leave the band, with Steve and Dal following him.

=== Early Trashmen ===
Don (Woody) Wood, a bass player, joined the group. Steve made the decision to call the band "The Trashmen" when they discovered the 1961 single "Trashman's Blues" by Minneapolis guitarist Kai Ray. The group was primarily an instrumental act, with Steve gradually taking over more lead vocals. Don Wood soon departed to join his brother's band, The Startones, and was replaced by Bob Reed after an audition. Before adopting "The Trashmen" full-time, the band performed at the Prom Ballroom in September 1962 under the name "Dal Winslow, New Sensation".

The group gained an interest in surf rock after listening to Dick Dale and taking a road trip to Southern California to study the surf music scene in Newport Beach. During this era, lead guitarist Tony Andreason conceived and wrote the instrumental track "On the Move", released as the B-side to "Bad News"; in some K-tel and Virgin Music digital distribution metadata, Wahrer has been credited under the typographical error "Steve Ward".

=== "Surfin' Bird" as first success ===
Cover of the 1995 reissue of the album featuring the hit single

The Trashmen's biggest hit was 1963's "Surfin' Bird", which entered the Billboard charts on December 7, 1963, and reached No. 4 on the Billboard Hot 100 on January 25, 1964. The song was a combination of two R&B hits by the Rivingtons, "The Bird's the Word" and "Papa-Oom-Mow-Mow". It was recorded at Kay Bank Studios in Minneapolis. Early pressings of the single credited the Trashmen's drummer and vocalist Steve Wahrer as the composer, but following legal complaints from The Rivingtons, songwriting credit was transferred to the four members of The Rivingtons (Al Frazier, Carl White, Sonny Harris, and Turner Wilson Jr.). According to bassist Bob Reed and guitarist Dal Winslow, each band member received $1.88 in their first royalty payment, with Winslow framing his check rather than cashing it.

The song was later covered by the Ramones, the Cramps, Silverchair, Pee-wee Herman, Equipe 84, and the thrash metal band Sodom (on their 2001 album M-16). It has also been featured in films including Full Metal Jacket, Pink Flamingos, Back to the Beach, Fred Claus, and The Big Year.

"Surfin' Bird" was the subject of the episode "I Dream of Jesus" of the television series Family Guy, sending the song to No. 8 on the iTunes Top 10 Rock songs chart and No. 50 on the UK Singles Chart in 2009. It has since become a running gag on the show.

In 2010, a Facebook campaign drawing over 400,000 supporters was launched to send the song to No. 1 in the UK over the Christmas season as a protest against the dominance of The X Factor winner's single (following a similar campaign for Rage Against the Machine's "Killing in the Name" in 2009). Selling 68,000 copies in the week before Christmas, the track debuted in the UK Top Ten on December 19, 2010, at No. 3.

It was also featured in the video game Battlefield Vietnam.

=== Disbanding ===
Beyond "Surfin' Bird", The Trashmen experienced limited national success. In 1964, "Bird Dance Beat" reached No. 30 on the Billboard Hot 100 in the United States and was a top 10 hit in Canada. Following a tour of South America in late 1964, their domestic appearances tapered off and the group disbanded in 1967. A four-CD box set of their work, Bird Call!: The Twin City Stomp of the Trashmen, was later released by Sundazed Music.

At the height of their success in 1964, Minneapolis entertainment columnist Will Jones reported a tongue-in-cheek rumor in his newspaper column that The Beatles and The Trashmen were planning to merge into a new group named "The Litterbugs".

=== Reunion ===
The group made sporadic reunions in the 1970s and 1980s, performing together until Steve Wahrer died of throat cancer in 1989. Later, Tony Andreason's brother Mark replaced Wahrer as drummer. Reed's son Robin joined as a touring member in 2009 on drums, filling in for Mark Andreason.

In 1999, the Trashmen played at the Las Vegas Grind. They also performed in Illinois, Ohio, Wisconsin, and Spain in 2007 and 2008, and toured Europe in 2008 and 2010 (including finally making their postponed 1965 UK visit).

The band recorded four tracks at Custom Recording Studios in Golden Valley, Minnesota, with longtime fan and guitarist Deke Dickerson for the record label Major Label, releasing the 7-inch EP I'm a Trashman in early 2013. A full-length follow-up LP, Bringing Back the Trash—their first studio album in 25 years—was released in 2014. After several 2015 shows in Minneapolis, the band re-entered retirement.

== Members ==
=== Classic line-up ===
- Tony Andreason – lead guitar, lead vocals (1962–1967, 1970s, 1982–2016)
- Dal Winslow – rhythm guitar, vocals (1962–1967, 1970s, 1982–2016)
- Bob Reed – bass guitar, vocals (1962–1967, 1970s, 1982–2016)
- Steve Wahrer – drums, lead vocals (1962–1967, 1970s, 1982–1988)

=== Other members ===
- Don Woody – bass guitar (1962); replaced by Bob Reed
- Mark Andreason – drums, backing vocals (1989–2009)
- Robin Reed – drums, backing vocals (2009–2016)
- Deke Dickerson – guitar (2013–2014)

== Discography ==
=== Albums ===
Year	Album	Label	Reissue	US 200
1964	Surfin' Bird	Garrett	Sundazed (1995)	48
1965	Bird Dance Beat	Garrett	Soma (c. 1996)	
1989	Comic Book Collector	NPR		
1994	The Great Lost Trashmen Album!	Sundazed		
2014	Deke Dickerson and the Trashmen: Bringing Back the Trash	Major Label Records		

=== Compilations, live albums, and EPs ===
Year	Album	Label
1990	Live Bird '65–'67	Sundazed
1992	Tube City!: The Best of the Trashmen	Sundazed
1998	Bird Call!: The Twin City Stomp of the Trashmen	Sundazed
2012	Teen Trot: Live at Ellsworth, WI, August 22, 1965	Sundazed
2013	I'm a Trashman (4-song EP, with Deke Dickerson)	Major Label
2022	The Best of the Trashmen	Sundazed

=== Singles ===
Year	Single	B-side	Peak positions					Album
Year	Single	B-side	US	AUS	CAN	NZ	UK	Album
1963	Surfin' Bird	"King of the Surf"	4	7	2	5	3	Surfin' Bird
1964	"Bird Dance Beat"	"A-Bone"	30	66	12	—	—	Non-album singles
1964	"Bad News"	"On the Move"	124	—	—	—	—	Non-album singles
1964	"Peppermint Man"	"New Generation"	—	—	—	—	—	Non-album singles
1964	"Whoa Dad"	"Walkin' My Baby"	—	—	—	—	—	Non-album singles
1964	"Dancing with Santa"	"Real Live Doll"	—	—	—	—	—	Non-album singles
1965	"Keep Your Hands Off My Baby"	"Lost Angel"	—	—	—	—	—	Non-album singles
1965	"Ubangi Stomp"	"Bird '65"	—	—	—	—	—	Non-album singles
1966	"Hanging on Me"	"Same Lines"	—	—	—	—	—	Non-album singles
1967	"Green, Green Backs Back Home"	"Address Enclosed"	—	—	—	—	—	Non-album singles
