= Kay Bank Studios =

Former recording studio in Minneapolis, Minnesota

Kay Bank Studios, also known as Kay Bank Recording Corporation, was a recording studio and phonograph manufacturer based in Minneapolis.

== History ==
Kay Bank Studios was established in 1946 by Vernon Charles Bank and his wife Kay Bank. Vernon and Kay first got into the recording business in 1946 when he bought a wire recorder for $400. They had intended to record weddings, but found no market for such recordings. They did find a demand for choir recordings, so they purchased disk-cutting equipment.

In 1948 they expanded again with tape recording equipment, and moved their equipment out of their kitchen at 3718 Glendale Terrace and into the living room of their new home at 4049 Garfield Ave. There they would cram bands for recording on the side while he was still working full time at the Minneapolis Star and Tribune.

In 1951 the Banks decided to dedicate themselves to the recording business full time, and incorporate, using Vernon Bank’s name. Cedric Adams told the story of the problems associated with incorporating a business by a man named Bank:

"Strange was the situation of a gent who found he couldn’t use his own name in business. He’s Vern Bank, one of our Star copydesk men. For some time, Bank and his wife, Kay, have been operating a recording business on the side. Now they’re expanding and re-locating downtown. To do this they incorporated. And to incorporate they had to have a firm name. They found the name Bank was out, though; state law provides that the word “bank” can’t be used in a business name unless the business is really a bank. To get a title they contracted Mrs. Bank’s moniker, and the new firm is Kaybank, Inc. There’s a bit of solace, however; on the firm’s letterhead the name can be Kay Bank, Inc."

In 1958, Vernon and Kay sold stock to friends and those associated with the recording industry.

They eventually set up their first studio at 111 N. 11th Street in Downtown Minneapolis in 1951.

In 1952, Cedric Adams described a new music-announcements system at the airport (then called Wold-Chamberlain Field), where soft music plays through 38 speakers, except when flight announcements were made. The announcements were made by 104 pre-recorded records listing flight data, recorded by Frank Butler at Kay Bank studio. Some complicated bit of business was explained in the event that more records were needed. The system took two years to plan and $13,000 to implement. It was the second behind Seattle to be put in use. (Minneapolis Star, December 18, 1952)

In 1953, Vern and Kay were featured in a Man-On-The-Street interview for Minneapolis Star

The Boutrous Plating Co., formerly of Owosso, Michigan, moved to Minneapolis in 1956 to join forces with Kay Bank. The firm specialized in plating acetate master records with copper, nickel, and chrome to form master disks for the manufacture of records in quantity. Using this process made it possible to produce records within 72 hours of the time of taping, shortening the time from two weeks.

The Banks had to send recordings to the West Coast to be cut, so in 1956 they decided to set up their own pressing plant. Kay Bank’s pressing plant at 2129 Washington Ave. N opened in January 1957.

On August 12, 1957, Kay Bank moved from its previous location on Eleventh Street to the former Swedien Recording Co. at 2541 Nicollet Ave. The move doubled the studio’s capacity.

Also in August, two more record presses were being installed at the Kay Bank pressing plant at 2129 Washington Ave. N., bringing the number to five.

Amos Heilicher was a record distributor who served as a major patron of Kay Bank via his ownership of Soma Records; many artists signed with Soma recorded at Kay Bank Studios. By 1964, the success of Dave Dudley’s “Six Days on the Road” and the Trashmen’s “Surfin’ Bird” had put the studio on the map, and bands were coming in from all over. Randy Bachman brought an early version of The Guess Who down from Winnipeg to get the “Kay Bank sound” (three-track recording and echo!). The Heilicher’s SOMA label began sometime between November 1953 and November 1954 and Doc Evans was the first record. (SOMA was Amos spelled backwards.)

Kay Bank offered an attractive package to local bands: For $395 you’d get three hours in the studio, a thousand 45s, and 50 promo packages delivered to radio stations in the Midwest. For $1,000 an artist could get an entire album recorded. Several Kay Bank clients, such as “Liar, Liar” by the Castaways, wound up on the Heilicher brothers’ record label, Soma.

The studio booked daytime sessions for commercial jingles and film scores; from 4 pm to 3 am, rock bands recorded demos or albums on local labels.

Kay Bank had something called an “Ear-Picture Room” that contained a file of five-minute tape records of performers listed in the Twin Cities talent directory. People looking to hire a particular kind of voice could go listen to the sample tapes at the audition room.

Kay Bank claimed that it had the most complete recording facilities of any plant between Pennsylvania and California. It had two studios, each its own echo chamber (important in 1958!) Recordings included radio commercials, flight announcements, radio shows, news broadcasts, singers, and choirs. By 1958 they were pressing 60,000 records a week, using six presses. The company had 18 employees.

In June 1959, Bobby Vee and the Shadows recorded “Suzie Baby” (written by Bobby) at Kay Bank. The record was distributed nationally on the Liberty label.

That Minnesota hotdish of culture, “Surfin’ Bird,” by the Trashmen, had been recorded sometime in 1963, and by January 1964 it was the top of the heap nationally, soon to be knocked off by The Beatles first Billboard Top 10 hit "I want to hold your hand.". But on January 13, 1964, it was time to celebrate the success of the song that ultimately made the Trashmen no money, and to launch two new works: the single, “Bird Dance Beat,” and the Brilliant LP “The Trashmen.” A party was held at Kay Bank, hosted by officials from SOMA, the distributor; Garrett Records, the producer; and Kay Bank. The party was attended by disk jockeys, “record peddlers,” and “a few young persons whose function was to dance "The Bird.”

Larry LaPole was also there, and he thanked Will Jones for inspiring several of the songs he wrote. On July 28, 1963, Jones had filled his column with a glossary of surf terms. When the Trashmen needed a flip side to “Surfin’ Bird” in a hurry, they turned to Larry, who in turn turned to the column for his vocabulary. That particular song was “King of the Surf,” "The best Surf Song ever written, in my opinion!" Larry also wrote several other songs, including “A Bone,” which was the flip side of “Bird Dance Beat.” Larry’s songs on the new LP included “My Woodie” and “Sleeper.”

An ad for Kay Bank Recording Corp. in the 1964 AFTRA Catalog cites John Michaelson as studio manager and Vern Bank, President. Equipment included:

Ampex Recorders (1, 2 & 3-track) Echo Chambers Three Studios, Air Conditioned Telefunken, RCA, Electrovoice, Sony Mikes Hammond Organ, Celeste, 2 Grand Pianos DuKane Tone Generator Line Equalization Scully Mastering Lathe Completely Automated Record Pressing Plant

In 1966, columnist George Grim stated that the Banks ran the “Largest independent recording and record-producing operation in the country.” Kay Bank had just opened a manufacturing plant in Charlotte, North Carolina in February 1966. Vern was proud of his capacity to produce as many as 25,000 records in a triple shift day. He had a dozen presses, and “new made-in-Sweden automatic electroplating automations.”

In early 1967 Vernon Bank sold his 50 Percent interest in Kay Bank to Jan Jansen, who had 40 Percent. He became a consultant in September 1967.

In April 1968, stockholders of Kay Bank, Inc. voted to change the name of the company to Sentinel Record Corp. The address of the company was given as 2129 Washington Ave. N, which was the pressing plant that had opened in January 1957.

Vernon officially “Quit” Kay Bank a/k/a Sentinel Record Corp. on January 1, 1968.

Sometime in 1967, Bank also sold his 1/3 interest in Universal Audio to Jan Jansen, Herb Pilhofer, and Don (John) Michaelson. The company had 60 employees.
