= Jump in the River =

1988 song by Sinéad O'Connor

Single by Sinéad O'Connor

from the album Married to the Mob
- B-side: "Never Get Old"
- Released: 17 October 1988
- Studio: S.T.S. (Dublin, Ireland)
- Length: 4:12
- Label: Ensign, Chrysalis
- Songwriter: Sinéad O'Connor
- Producer: Sinéad O'Connor

Sinéad O'Connor singles chronology
"I Want Your (Hands on Me)" (1988)	"Jump in the River" (1988)	"Nothing Compares 2 U" (1990)

Music video
- "Jump in the River" on YouTube

"Jump in the River" is a song recorded by Irish singer Sinéad O'Connor. It originally appeared on the Married to the Mob soundtrack in 1988 and was released as a single the same year. It was also released as a 12" maxi-single that included a remixed version featuring the American performance artist Karen Finley.

A remix of the song was later included on O'Connor's second studio album I Do Not Want What I Haven't Got (1990), as well as on the B-side of the 7" single for "Nothing Compares 2 U."

== Composition ==
A year after O'Connor released her first album, The Lion and the Cobra, she contributed "Jump in the River" to the soundtrack of Jonathan Demme's film Married to the Mob in 1988. Later that year, O'Connor took part in a concert organized by the human rights activist group Refuse & Resist! at the Palladium in New York City. It was there that she met the performance artist Karen Finley, who she invited to participate in the 12" remix of "Jump in the River." Finley contributed a sexually explicit spoken-word section of the song. Village Voice rock critic Robert Christgau wrote that Finley "surfaced as the voice of mad lust on a dance remix of the ravishingly sexual 'Jump in the River.'"

== Charts ==
Chart	Peak position
Australian Singles Chart	134
Irish Singles Chart	29
UK Singles Chart	81
US Modern Rock Tracks	17

== Track listings ==
7" single

1. Jump in the River
2. Never Get Old

12" maxi-single

1. Jump in the River
2. Jerusalem
3. Jump in the River (remix featuring Karen Finley)

== Credits and personnel ==
- Sinéad O'Connor – music and lyrics, lead vocals, producer, mixing
- Andy Rourke - Bass Guitar
- Marco Pirroni – music and lyrics
- Mike Joyce - Drums on 'Never Get Old'
- Chris Birkett – engineering, mixing
- Fachtna O' Ceallaigh – mixing
