= The Family (The Family album) =

1985 studio album by the Family

Studio album by The Family
- Released: August 19, 1985
- Recorded: 1984–1985
- Genres: Pop, R&B, funk, jazz
- Length: 36:00
- Label: Paisley Park/Warner Bros.
- Producers: David Z; Prince; Eric Leeds

The Family is the sole studio album by the American band the Family, released on August 19, 1985, by Prince's Paisley Park Records. The album features the first appearance of the ballad "Nothing Compares 2 U", which would become more widely known five years later when a cover by Sinéad O'Connor was released as a single.

== Background ==
The album consists of eight Minneapolis sound tracks but with a funk-jazz slant. Two of the tracks are instrumentals, and three are ballads; many feature string arrangements by Clare Fischer, marking the beginning of Prince's longstanding association with the Michigan-born composer-arranger. A single was released for "The Screams of Passion", a modest hit that was re-released in 1996 on the Girl 6 soundtrack. A promo version of "High Fashion" was distributed. "Nothing Compares 2 U", an emotional ballad, became more widely known five years later when a cover by Sinéad O'Connor was released as a single to worldwide success.

The album was released on vinyl; following the success of O'Connor's version of "Nothing Compares 2 U" a CD version of the album was released in Japan and Germany/Europe.

Alternate recordings of several of the songs from the project featuring Prince on vocals were recorded, but most remain in the vault at Paisley Park Studios. Prince's original 1984 studio recording of "Nothing Compares 2 U" was not officially released until 2018, when it was issued as a single by Warner Bros. Records in conjunction with his estate.

== Reception ==
Professional ratings
Review scores
Source	Rating
AllMusic	3/5 stars

In Smash Hits, Tom Hibbert said besides "Nothing Compares 2 U", which had "a billion 'weeping' violins" then, "The choice is between very weak songs that sound like Jermaine Jackson and Pia Zadora imitating Prince and totally pointless instrumentals with horrible sax honking."

== Track listing ==
All tracks are written by Prince (but officially credited to others), except where noted.

Side one
No.	Title	Writer(s)	Original Writing Credit	Length
1.	"High Fashion"		Jerome Benton; Paul "St. Paul" Peterson	5:06
2.	"Mutiny"		Benton	3:57
3.	"The Screams of Passion"		Susannah Kay Melvoin Bramhall; Peterson	5:26
4.	"Yes"	Prince; Eric Leeds	Benton; Jellybean Johnson	4:27

Side two
No.	Title	Writer(s)	Original Writing Credit	Length
5.	"River Run Dry"	Bobby Z.		3:31
6.	"Nothing Compares 2 U"	Prince		4:31
7.	"Susannah's Pajamas"	Prince; Leeds	Leeds	3:58
8.	"Desire"		Peterson	4:58

== Personnel ==
- St. Paul Peterson – lead vocals
- Susannah Melvoin – lead and backing vocals (tracks 1, 3, 5, 6, 8)
- Prince – all instruments, except where noted
- Eric Leeds – saxophone (tracks 1–2, 4, 6, 8)
- Clare Fischer – string orchestration
- Wendy Melvoin – rhythm guitar (track 4)

== Charts ==
Chart performance for The Family
Chart (1985)	Peak position
US Billboard Top Pop Albums	62
US Billboard Top Black Albums	17
