= Lock, Stock and Two Smoking Barrels =

1998 film by Guy Ritchie

- UK theatrical release poster
- Directed by: Guy Ritchie
- Written by: Guy Ritchie
- Produced by: Matthew Vaughn
- Starring: Jason Flemyng; Dexter Fletcher; Nick Moran; Jason Statham; Steven Mackintosh; Vinnie Jones; Sting
- Cinematography: Tim Maurice-Jones
- Edited by: Niven Howie
- Music by: David A. Hughes; John Murphy
- Production companies: Summit Entertainment; SKA Films; The Steve Tisch Company; HandMade Films
- Distributed by: PolyGram Filmed Entertainment (United Kingdom and Ireland); Gramercy Pictures (United States); Summit Entertainment (International)
- Release dates: 23 August 1998 (Edinburgh International Film Festival); 28 August 1998 (United Kingdom); 5 March 1999 (United States)
- Running time: 106 minutes
- Countries: United Kingdom; United States
- Language: English
- Budget: £800,000; ($1.4 million)
- Box office: $28.1 million

Lock, Stock and Two Smoking Barrels is a 1998 British crime comedy film written and directed by Guy Ritchie. It follows a heist involving a confident young card sharp who loses £500,000 to a powerful crime lord in a rigged game of three-card brag, prompting him to pay off his debts by enlisting his friends to help him rob a small-time gang operating out of the apartment next door. It stars an ensemble cast featuring Jason Flemyng, Dexter Fletcher, Nick Moran, Jason Statham (in his film debut), Steven Mackintosh, Vinnie Jones, and Sting.

The film brought Ritchie international acclaim and introduced Statham (a former diver) and Jones (a former footballer) to worldwide audiences in their feature film debuts. It was also a commercial success, grossing over $28 million at the box office against a $1.35 million budget. A television spin-off called Lock, Stock... followed in 2000, running for seven episodes.

== Plot ==
Long-time friends and small-time London criminals Eddie, Tom, Soap, and Bacon put together £100,000 so that Eddie, a card sharp, can participate in one of "Hatchet" Harry Lonsdale's high-stakes three-card brag games. The game, however, is rigged; and not only does Eddie lose his money, he winds up owing £500,000 to Harry, with only a week's grace before payment is due. Harry sends his debt collector Big Chris (and his son Little Chris) to Eddie's father JD, since Harry's true intention is to acquire JD's bar in payment of the debt.

Also interested in two expensive antique Holland & Holland shotguns up for auction, Harry gets his enforcer Barry "the Baptist" to hire two Scouser thieves, Gary and Dean, to steal them from an insolvent lord. Unfortunately, they end up selling the guns to Nick "the Greek", a local fence, instead of bringing them to Harry; Barry threatens them into retrieving the guns.

Meanwhile, Eddie, desperate to find a way to get the money needed to pay back Harry, overhears his neighbours- a gang of robbers led by the brutal 'Dog'- planning a heist on a nearby cannabis patch run by an eloquent student named Winston and his friends, aiming to steal their cannabis crop and money. Informing Tom, Soap and Bacon of this, the four decide to surprise Dog and his crew after they rob the cannabis growers and make off with the goods themselves. Tom goes to Nick the Greek to purchase firearms in preparation for the job, and- with neither man aware of their true value- buys the pair of shotguns Harry is after.

Dog's gang begin their heist with the help of Plank, one of the growers' customers, and despite two setbacks (one gang member is killed by his own Bren gun, while another is forced to incapacitate and kidnap an unfortunate traffic warden that tries to ticket their van) they succeed in stealing a duffel bag full of money and a van loaded with bags of cannabis. Their victory is short lived, however, as Eddie and friends subsequently ambush Dog and his remaining crew, taking the van, drugs and traffic warden. Transferring the loot to their own van and beating the traffic warden before dumping him on the side of the road, they take the drugs to Nick to fence.

Nick barters with Rory Breaker, a psychotic gang boss, who agrees to buy the cannabis at half price. However, it is soon revealed that Rory owns Winston's grow operation when two of his men investigate- Nick has inadvertently tried to sell Rory his own drugs. Incensed, Rory threatens Nick into giving him Eddie's address, while he tasks Winston with identifying the men that robbed the operation.

While Eddie and friends celebrate at JD's Bar, Dog's gang- having discovered that their neighbours are the ones that took the loot- set up an ambush in Eddie's flat. Instead of Eddie, however, Rory and his gang are the next ones to enter, seeking retribution from Eddie themselves. A shootout ensues, and the only people to survive are Dog and Winston; Winston leaves quietly with the drugs, while Dog attempts to escape with the shotguns and cash. Before he can leave, however, Big Chris- sent by Harry to put pressure on Eddie- incapacitates him and takes the loot; Dean and Chris, chasing the shotguns for Barry, follow him unaware that he is going back to report to Harry.

After delivering the money and guns to Harry, Big Chris returns to his car to find that Dog has followed him; holding Little Chris at knifepoint, Dog demands that the cash be returned to him, which Chris agrees to. Meanwhile, Dean and Gary have found their way to Harry's office, still unaware that Harry was in fact the one employing them through Barry; Dean bursts into Harry's office and is shot dead by Harry using one of the shotguns. Gary avenges Dean by killing Harry and Barry the Baptist, but is himself killed by Barry's thrown hatchet.

Eddie and friends return to Eddie's flat, only to discover that the place is wrecked and their loot is missing. They head to Harry's office for answers only to discover a second set of corpses and the cash from the heist. Big Chris, meanwhile, deliberately crashes his car in order to disable Dog, before bludgeoning him to death with the car door; he then investigates Harry's office and discovers Eddie and friends. After a brief standoff, Big Chris takes the cash from the heist, but allows Tom to leave with the shotguns.

Eddie and friends are arrested, but the traffic warden- the only witness to the crimes committed- is only able to positively identify Dog and his crew, and they are subsequently released. Returning to the bar, Tom tells them that he still has the shotguns; since they are the only evidence of their involvement in the film's events, Eddie, Bacon and Soap tell him to discard them. While he does so, Big Chris enters the bar in search of Eddie and friends, in order to return the empty bag that formerly contained the heist cash; he also informs them that he intends to leave them alone as long as they don't try to seek him out in the future.

Much to the friends' chagrin, the bag is empty save for an auction catalogue of antique weapons. As they leaf through the catalogue, they discover the true value of the shotguns they have just told Tom to dispose of; the film ends with the three frantically trying to contact Tom, while he leans over the rail of Battersea Bridge, holding his mobile phone ringing in his mouth as he prepares to drop the guns into the River Thames.

== Cast ==
- Nick Moran as Eddie
- Jason Flemyng as Tom
- Dexter Fletcher as Soap
- Jason Statham as Bacon
- Steven Mackintosh as Winston
- Vinnie Jones as Big Chris
- Peter McNicholl as Little Chris
- Nicholas Rowe as J
- Lenny McLean as Barry "the Baptist"
- P. H. Moriarty as "Hatchet" Harry Lonsdale
- Frank Harper as Dog
- Sting as JD
- Huggy Leaver as Paul
- Stephen Marcus as Nick "the Greek"
- Vas Blackwood as Rory Breaker
- Vera Day as Tanya
- Alan Ford as Alan
- Danny John-Jules as Barfly Jack
- Victor McGuire as Gary
- Jake Abraham as Dean
- Rob Brydon as the traffic warden
- Steve Collins as boxing gym bouncer
- Steve Sweeney as Plank

== Soundtrack ==
Soundtrack from the Motion Picture Lock, Stock and Two Smoking Barrels

Soundtrack album by various artists
- Released: 1998 (UK); 23 February 1999 (US)
- Genres: Rock pop Britpop reggae
- Length: 62:54 (UK); 43:32 (US)
- Labels: Island (UK); Maverick (US)

Soundtrack reviews
Review scores
Source	Rating
AllMusic	Link

The soundtrack to the film was released in 1998 in the United Kingdom by Island Records. Madonna's Maverick Records label released the soundtrack in the United States in 1999 but omitted nine tracks from the UK release. The film score was composed by David A. Hughes (formerly of OMD) and John Murphy, who also wrote multiple songs on the soundtrack album.

1. "Hundred Mile High City" by Ocean Colour Scene
2. "It's a Deal, It's a Steal" by Tom, Nick & Ed*
3. "The Boss" by James Brown
4. "Truly, Madly, Deeply" by Skanga*
5. "Hortifuckinculturist" – Winston
6. "Police and Thieves" by Junior Murvin
7. "18 With a Bullet" by Lewis Taylor & Carleen Anderson*
8. "Spooky" by Dusty Springfield
9. "The Game" by John Murphy & David A. Hughes*
10. "Muppets" by Harry, Barry & Gary
11. "Man Machine" by Robbie Williams*
12. "Walk This Land" by E-Z Rollers
13. "Blaspheming Barry" by Barry
14. "I Wanna Be Your Dog" by The Stooges
15. "It's Kosher" by Tom & Nick
16. "Liar, Liar" by The Castaways*
17. "I've Been Shot" by Plank & Dog
18. "Why Did You Do It" by Stretch
19. "Guns 4 show, knives for a pro" by Ed & Soap
20. "Oh Girl" by Evil Superstars
21. "If the Milk Turns Sour" by John Murphy & David A. Hughes (with Rory)*
22. "Zorba the Greek" by John Murphy & David A. Hughes
23. "I'll Kill Ya" by John Murphy & David A. Hughes (with Rory)*
24. "The Payback" by James Brown
25. "Fool's Gold" by The Stone Roses*
26. "It's Been Emotional" by Big Chris
27. "18 With a Bullet" by Pete Wingfield

* Track omitted from 1999 US release.

Release history

Region	Date
United Kingdom	28 August 1998
United States	23 February 1999

== Production ==
The production of the film followed Guy Ritchie's single short film which preceded Lock, Stock. As stated in filmscouts.com:

Although it was Ritchie's first feature, his previous short film The Hard Case was sufficiently impressive to secure interest not only from financial backers but also persuaded Sting to take the role of JD. "I'd seen Guy's short film and was excited by the pace and energy in it. The way in which he handles violence and action appealed to me. I don't like gratuitous violence. I think it's much more chilling when it's suggested rather than graphic." For Ritchie, getting exactly the right actor for each role was essential. "The casting took forever and we auditioned hundreds of people, but I was determined to hold out until we got the real McCoy." This led to employing several genuine ex-cons, who certainly invest the film with its menacing undertones. Ritchie also looked to the celebrity arena to secure the right cast such as Vinnie Jones. "I didn't hesitate in casting Vinnie as I have the most incredible respect for his acting capabilities."

A one-hour documentary of the production of the film was released featuring much of the cast along with Ritchie.

Locations include Shoreditch for the gang hideout and Clerkenwell for JD's bar.

The film was Lenny McLean's final film appearance, as he died in July 1998, shortly before the film's release.

== Release ==
Summit Entertainment acquired worldwide distribution rights to the film excluding the UK upon its premiere at the 1998 Cannes Film Festival. PolyGram Filmed Entertainment, which already held UK rights, acquired distribution rights for the film in North America (with U.S. distribution being handled by its subsidiary Gramercy Pictures), later extended to include Australia, New Zealand, Germany, Austria, the Benelux, France, Spain and Switzerland.

== Reception ==
=== Box office ===
The film was released on 28 August 1998 in the United Kingdom and was the second-highest grossing local production for the year behind Sliding Doors with a gross of $18.9 million. It was released on 5 March 1999 in the United States, where its total gross was $3,753,929 (equivalent to $7,255,146 in 2025).

=== Critical reception ===
On Rotten Tomatoes, the film has an approval rating of 75% based on 67 reviews, with an average rating of 6.70/10. The site's critical consensus reads, "Lock, Stock, and Two Smoking Barrels is a grimy, twisted, and funny twist on the Tarantino hip gangster formula". On Metacritic, the film has a weighted average score of 66 out of 100 based on 30 reviews, indicating "generally favorable" reviews.

John Ferguson in Radio Times called the film "the best British crime film since The Long Good Friday". Roger Ebert in Chicago Sun-Times wrote: "Lock, Stock is fun, in a slapdash way; it has an exuberance, and in a time when movies follow formulas like zombies, it's alive".

=== Accolades ===
The film was nominated for a British Academy Film Award in 1998 for the outstanding British Film of the Year. In 1999, it was nominated for a Brit Award for Soundtrack/Cast Recording. In 2000, Ritchie won an Edgar Award from the Mystery Writers of America for Best Motion Picture Screenplay. In 2004, Total Film named it the 38th greatest British film of all time. In 2016, Empire magazine ranked Lock, Stock 75th on their list of the 100 best British films.

== Television ==
A spin-off television series, co-written by Ritchie was developed for Channel 4. The show featured a new cast of characters: Moon, Jamie, Bacon, and Lee (portrayed by Daniel Caltagirone, Scott Maslen, Shaun Parkes, and Del Synnott, respectively); who comedically fail at various criminal business ventures, similar to the cast of the feature film. Lock, Stock... aired from May 29 through July 11, 2000.

== See also ==
- Hyperlink cinema – the film style of using multiple interconnected story lines
- Heist film
- Phir Hera Pheri - An unofficial remake of the movie, with a similar plot but a slightly different storyline.
- Tarantinoesque film
