= The Fendermen =

American musical duo

- Genres: Rockabilly
- Years active: 1959-1963
- Labels: Cuca, Soma, Dab
- Past members: Jim Sundquist; Phil Humphrey

The Fendermen were an American rockabilly duo, composed of Jim Sundquist and Phil Humphrey, active in the early 1960s. They are best known for the 1960 hit single "Mule Skinner Blues", a cover of a song written by Jimmie Rodgers.

Jim Sundquist, lead guitarist, was born James D. Sundquist, in Niagara, Wisconsin; he later settled in Minnesota. Phil Humphrey, rhythm guitarist, was from Milwaukee, Wisconsin. At the time of trcording, Humphrey lived in Stoughton, Wisconsin, with his wife and daughter.

Sundquist and Humphrey, both born on November 26, 1937, met as students at the University of Wisconsin–Madison in the late 1950s under the direction of William Dreger, a music-store owner in Middleton, Wisconsin. The duo had one hit single, "Mule Skinner Blues", released in 1960 on the Cuca Records label, which was picked up for national distribution by Soma Records. The song was originally recorded in the basement of Middleton Music on an aluminum disc. The song hit number five on the Billboard Hot 100, number 32 in the UK Singles Chart in September 1960, and number two in Canada.

The duo called themselves "the Fendermen" because they played Fender guitars (a Telecaster and a Stratocaster), and they connected them both to the same amplifier. These guitars were the only instruments used in the recording of "Mule Skinner Blues". The Fendermen toured with Johnny Cash and many others on the road across the US. William Herbert Dreger was the original producer for the Fendermen and was later replaced due to a dispute among the group. He was responsible for helping the two-man group get off the ground and onto charts, where they were praised for their musical prowess. William Dreger was also responsible for the ending of the song "Mule Skinner Blues" in which the group could not come up with a viable way to end the song. Thus, the ending was made one day when William said "Cha Cha Cha", thus creating the ending to a wonderful folk song. William tried to keep in touch with the rest of the group, but was never answered back, though he kept track of them and watched them rise to stardom. He was never paid for work as producer for the group, he and died on August 3, 2019. He kept the legacy of the Fendermen alive by telling people of the group and how they were formed. He kept the original copy of the album along with a copy of the Soma Records 45 and an LP 33 with the Fendermen and many others who hit the top 10 in 1960.

The Fendermen sat at the number-three spot at Johnny Rockets in Greenville, South Carolina, for many years before being removed and the restaurant being shut down.

Sundquist was a guest on Minneapolis rockabilly group the Vibro Champs' 1999 album Ultra Modern, playing guitar on the song "Beach Party". The Vibro Champs were longtime fans of the duo and had covered their version of "Mule Skinner Blues" on the 1996 album Stranger Than You Think.

In 2005, the Fendermen reunited for a two-show performance, with the Vibro Champs as the backing band.

Sundquist died on June 4, 2013, of cancer at his home in Fairfax, Minnesota, at age 75. Humphrey died on March 29, 2016, at a Minnesota hospital, at age 78, due to heart failure.

== Discography ==
=== Albums ===
Year	Album	Label
1960	Mule Skinner Blues	Soma

=== Singles ===
Year	Title	Peak chart positions			Record Label	B-side	Album
Year	Title	US Pop	US Country	UK	Record Label	B-side	Album
1960	"Mule Skinner Blues"	5	16	32	Soma	"Torture"	Mule Skinner Blues
1960	"Don't You Just Know It"	110	—	—	Soma	"Beach Party"	Mule Skinner Blues
1961	"Heartbreakin' Special"	—	—	—	Soma	"Can't You Wait"	Mule Skinner Blues
