= The Goose Island Ramblers =

Folk music group from Wisconsin

- Origin: Madison, Wisconsin
- Genres: Folk; Polka; Old-Time; "Ethnic music"
- Years active: 1960-1975, 1989-1999
- Past members: K. Wendell “Uncle Windy” Whitford; “Smokey George” Gilbertsen; Bruce Bollerud

The Goose Island Ramblers were a folk music trio from Madison, Wisconsin. They were one of the most prominent groups playing "polkabilly" music (a term coined by musicologist James P. Leary to mean the ethnic-influenced popular music of the Upper Midwest) in the second half of the 20th century. Their unique musical style blended polka and traditional music from continental Europe, American country and old-time tunes, and humorous novelty songs grounded in the culture of Wisconsin.

== History ==
All three members of the group were born to musical families in south-central Wisconsin. K. Wendell Whitford was born in Albion, Wisconsin, of English descent but embedded in the Norwegian-American musical community of his hometown. George Gilbertson was born on the outskirts of Madison to Norwegian immigrants, and grew up playing all sorts of music, from "Norsky" fiddle tunes to country and western songs. Bruce Bollerud was born on a dairy farm in Hollandale, Wisconsin to Norwegian-American parents, and grew up playing German and Norwegian dance tunes, country music, and rockabilly.

Windy Whitford played in several string bands as a young adult, one of which was named 'The Goose Island Ramblers.' The phrase 'goose island' was used by Norwegian-Americans to describe the fertile land in southeastern Dane County, a corruption of the Norwegian phrase godt land ('good land'). That original band dissolved in 1944, but Whitford kept the name when he started playing music with Gilbertson and Bollerud.

The trio Goose Island Ramblers started out in 1960 as the house band for Glen and Ann's Tavern in Madison, a bar famous for its music. They played regularly there for twelve years, drawing both Madison's ethnic working class and the students at University of Wisconsin-Madison (a rare feat in an age of stark polarization between those groups). Their career highlight during this period was playing for the Masters Concert Series at Wolftrap Farm Park near Washington, D.C., recorded by Radio Smithsonian and broadcast over National Public Radio. They were also made frequent appearances on Down Home Dairyland, a Wisconsin Public Radio show that played "the traditional and ethnic music of Wisconsin and the Upper Midwest."

The band dissolved in 1975, but all three members remained active musicians in the Madison area. They reunited in 1989 for sporadic shows over the next decade, including a 1999 farewell show which sold out Madison's Barrymore Theatre.

== Musical style and legacy ==
The Goose Island Rambler's sound has been described as "Norwegian- and Anglo-American fiddle tunes and ballads, Scandihoovian and Dutchman dialect comedy, German and Slavic couple dances, Hawaiian guitars, rural novelty numbers, cowboy and hillbilly songs, bluegrass, rockabilly, and more.” The band's shows were involved, usually involving some combination of props, costumes, comedy skits, and audience participation.

Musicologist James P. Leary coined the term 'polkabilly' to describe the style of the Goose Island Ramblers in his 2010 book Polkabilly: How the Goose Island Ramblers Redefined American Folk Music. He said that the Goose Island Ramblers challenged existing genre labels at the time, due to the popular definitions of 'folk music' or 'country music' being almost exlusively focused on the music of Anglo-Celtic White Americans and African-Americans. The creolization that took place in the Upper Midwest between many different European and Indigenous groups defied that catagorization, with sounds blending and mixing while never fully losing their distinct ethnic backgrounds. The Goose Island Ramblers brought continental European music into conversation with the pre-existing notions of what 'folk music' or 'country music' was, emblematic of the wider Upper Midwest region.

== Members ==
- K. Wendell "Uncle Windy" Whitford - guitar, fiddle, mandolin, vocals
- "Smokey George" Gilbertsen - accordion, fiddle, guitar, mandolin, dobro, vocals
- Bruce Bollard - accordion, fiddle, guitar, mandolin, vocals

== Discography ==
All albums except Midwest Ramblin' were released by Cuca Records and are available at UW-Madison's Mills Music Library.

- Doin' the Hurley Hop (1964)
- From Bluegrass to Gypsy (1964)
- A Session with the Goose Island Ramblers (1966)
- Midwest Ramblin' (1994 by the Wisconsin Folk Museum, reissued in 2004)

They were also featured on Smithsonian Folkways' 2002 album Deeper Polka: More Dance Music from the Midwest.
