= Nothing Compares 2 U =

1985 song by Prince and covered by Sinéad O'Connor

Song by The Family

from the album The Family
- Recorded: August 19, 1985
- Genre: Contemporary R&B
- Length: 4:33
- Label: Paisley Park
- Songwriter: Prince

"Nothing Compares 2 U"

Single by Prince

from the album Originals
- Released: April 19, 2018
- Genre: Pop rock
- Length: 4:41
- Label: NPG; Warner
- Songwriter: Prince

Prince singles chronology
"Free Urself" (2015)	"Nothing Compares 2 U" (2018)	"Mary Don't You Weep" (2018)

"Nothing Compares 2 U" is a 1985 song written by American musician Prince for his project, The Family, featured on its 1985 debut album. It was popularized when Irish singer and songwriter Sinéad O'Connor covered it for her 1990 studio album, I Do Not Want What I Haven't Got, the song having lyrics which express an abandoned lover's feelings of longing.

"Nothing Compares 2 U" became O'Connor's signature song, and though it sparked some controversy between O'Connor and Prince, they came to amicable terms in the years before his death in 2016. Prince went on to perform the song regularly during his live performances, with live performances being included on The Hits/The B-Sides, Rave Un2 the Year 2000, and One Nite Alone... Live!. A solo version by Prince was later released in 2018.

== History ==
"Nothing Compares 2 U" was written by the American musician Prince, who recorded a demo in 1984. In 1985, Prince's funk band the Family released its sole studio album, The Family, including "Nothing Compares 2 U". It was not released as a single and received little recognition. Prince's demo was released in 2018.

In 1993, Prince released a live version of "Nothing Compares 2 U", with Rosie Gaines on guest vocals, on his compilation album The Hits/The B-Sides. His 1984 demo was released as a single in 2018 and included on the 2019 compilation Originals.

Prince's 1984 demo, remixed by Tony Maserati, was released as a single in 2018, and later on the posthumous compilation Originals, by Warner Bros. Records in conjunction with his estate. It was accompanied by a music video, consisting of edited rehearsal footage shot in mid-1984. The single reached number 21 on the US Hot R&B Songs chart and number eight on the US R&B Digital Song Sales chart in 2018. This version also reached number seven on the US Bubbling Under Hot 100 chart in 1993. Following Prince's death in 2016, this version reached number 43 on the US Digital Songs Sales chart and number 31 on the US R&B/Hip-Hop Digital Song Sales chart.

== Personnel ==
=== The Family version ===
Adapted from Duane Tudahl.

==== Musicians ====
- Prince – Yamaha DX7
- Eric Leeds – saxophone
- Susannah Melvoin – backing vocals
- St. Paul Peterson – lead vocals

==== Production ====
- Susan Rogers – recording engineer

=== The Hits/The B-Sides version ===
Adapted from Benoît Clerc.

==== Musicians ====
- Prince – lead vocals, electric guitar, piano
- Tommy Barbarella – synthesizers
- Michael B. – drums
- Rosie Gaines – lead vocals, synthesizers
- Kathy Jensen – baritone saxophone
- Levi Seacer Jr. – electric guitar
- Sonny T. – bass guitar

==== Production ====
- Prince – producer

=== Originals version ===
Adapted from Benoît Clerc.

==== Musicians ====
- Prince – lead and backing vocals, electric guitar, bass guitar, synthesizers, drums
- Eric Leeds – saxophone
- Susannah Melvoin – backing vocals
- Orchestra

==== Production ====
- Prince – producer
- Susan Rogers – recording engineer
- Clare Fischer – strings arrangement

== Charts ==
=== Weekly charts ===
Weekly chart performance for "Nothing Compares 2 U"
Chart (2018)	Peak position
France (SNEP)	66
UK Singles Downloads (Official Charts)	61
UK Physical Singles (Official Charts)	2

== Sinéad O'Connor version ==
"Nothing Compares 2 U"

Single by Sinéad O'Connor

from the album I Do Not Want What I Haven't Got
- B-side: "Jump in the River"
- Released: January 8, 1990
- Studio: S.T.S (Dublin, Ireland); Britannia Row (London, UK); Westside (London)
- Genre: Pop
- Length: 5:10
- Label: Chrysalis
- Songwriter: Prince
- Producers: Sinéad O'Connor; Nellee Hooper; Chris Birkett

Sinéad O'Connor singles chronology
"Jump in the River" (1988)	"Nothing Compares 2 U" (1990)	"The Emperor's New Clothes" (1990)

Music video
- "Nothing Compares 2 U" on YouTube

Audio sample
- file; help

Sinéad O'Connor covered "Nothing Compares 2 U" for her 1990 studio album, I Do Not Want What I Haven't Got, and was produced by O'Connor and Nellee Hooper.

O'Connor's rendition was released as a single in early 1990 by Chrysalis Records and became a worldwide hit. Its accompanying music video, directed by John Maybury, received heavy rotation on MTV. In December 1990, Billboard magazine named "Nothing Compares 2 U" the "#1 World Single" of 1990 at its first Billboard Music Awards. It was the second-best-selling single of 1990 in the UK and the third-best-selling song for 1990 in the US.

=== Recording ===
Sinéad O'Connor recorded "Nothing Compares 2 U" with a new arrangement by her and the producer Nellee Hooper. O'Connor's version is in the key of F major.

Pre-production for the song was done at Hooper's house. Hooper enlisted Gota Yashiki, with whom he'd previously worked on Soul II Soul's debut studio album, to do arranging and programming of instrument and drum tracks for the song. Yashiki utilized an Atari ST computer running C-Lab Notator sequencing software and an Akai S1100 sampler. After recording sessions moved to Britannia Row Studios, live drum parts were overdubbed and the cello part, provided by the Akai sampler, was finalized.

O'Connor's vocals were recorded in a single take, then double-tracked with another subsequent take, using an AKG C414B-ULS large-diaphragm condenser microphone. Per the singer's demands, absolutely no compression was to be used on her vocals.

=== Critical reception ===
"A few times each year a song comes along that deserves extra-special recognition. Here's the first such entry of 1990. Since I've been shouting the praises of Sinéad's remarkable interpretation of this Prince-penned tune to many of you for over a month, it was safe to assume it would eventually end up on this page. Absolutely brilliant—and if you haven't caught the video, do yourself a favor and check it out NOW!"

— Dave Sholin from the Gavin Report talking about the song.

O'Connor's version received mostly positive reviews. Jodi Cleesattle from American Eagle felt that "there is pain in Sinéad O'Connor's voice, and there probably always will be". She remarked that "loneliness and longing" are highlighted on the song, adding that O'Connor's voice "fits the song perfectly. Her vocals soar and leap unexpectedly but gracefully, making, the ballad, the loveliest of love songs." Bill Coleman from Billboard magazine named it a "brilliant interpretation of the melancholic lament." Ernest Hardy from Cashbox called it a "genuine tear-jerker".

Greg Sandow for Entertainment Weekly felt it is a song "about how to carry on after losing love". Tom Moon from Knight Ridder said she "adapts the breathy approach of a torch singer." A reviewer from Los Angeles Times noted that the singer "match raw emotion with spare sounds" on "the quiet, desperate, lovelorn beauty". Melody Maker wrote, "It should go without saying that her voice is brilliant, but this is a pointless and embarrassing over-sentimental paw. The zillions of strings don't help, they don't add poignancy, they merely serve to drag the momentum backwards. [...] A waste of talent."

Pan-European magazine Music & Media stated that out of all the recent covers of Prince songs – Chaka Khan's "I Feel for You", Tom Jones' "Kiss" and Simple Minds' "Sign o' the Times" – "this is definitely the most convincing." The reviewer noted further that originally recorded by Minneapolis band the Family for their 1985 debut album, "O'Connor's emotionally charged version has immediate appeal", and is "destined to be her biggest hit to date." David Giles from Music Week found that the song "is not one of Prince's finest moments, and O'Connor does little to disguise this fact bar a few token vocal somersaults. The string synths also have a dirge-like effect, dragging the rest of the arrangement along with them."

The Network Forty's reviewer wrote that "when Sinéad sang 'Nothing Compares 2 U', seas calmed, angels wept and Top 40 radio stood still to listen to this powerful expression of unrequited love." James Brown from NME said, "Pining for a recently departed love, Sinéad hits the lyrics with an immense range of vocal ability and passion. From a gossamer thin whisper to a searing plea she shows just how much catching up Kate Bush has to do." Tom Doyle from Smash Hits felt that "it doesn't sound at all like any of her other stuff."

=== Commercial performance ===
O'Connor's version was a worldwide hit, topping charts in O'Connor's native Ireland, Australia, Austria, Canada, Denmark, Germany, Mexico, Netherlands, New Zealand, Norway, Sweden, Switzerland, the United Kingdom and the United States (plus top five in France). It was certified platinum in Austria and in the United Kingdom, and gold in Germany and in Sweden.

In the United States it spent four weeks at the top of the Billboard Hot 100; in addition, it was number one on the Billboard Alternative Songs chart and reached number two on the Billboard Adult Contemporary chart (held off the top position by Rod Stewart's "This Old Heart of Mine" for three weeks). In terms of its chart performance on the Hot 100 it ranked number three for 1990. In April 1990, it was certified platinum by the Recording Industry Association of America. On the second of its four weeks at number one, the record's parent album I Do Not Want What I Haven't Got started a six-week run at number one on the Billboard 200. In 2019, the single ranked 97 in a Hot 100 60th-anniversary Top 600 covering the period from 1958 to 2018.

In the United Kingdom the single ranked number two for the year, behind a re-release of the Righteous Brothers' "Unchained Melody". In July 2023, days after O'Connor's death, "Nothing Compares 2 U" reappeared on the UK Top 100 at number 45, and charted at number 1 on the UK Singles Downloads Chart.

=== Music video ===
The lone face of O'Connor made the video one of the most recognizable of the 1990s.

Directed by John Maybury, the music video consists mostly of a close-up of O'Connor's face as she goes through stages of sadness and anger while singing the lyrics; the rest consists of her walking through the Parc de Saint-Cloud in Paris. Toward the end of the video, two tears roll down her face, one on each cheek. O'Connor has said that her tears were real. She did not intend to cry but then thought, "I should let this happen." She explained that the tears were triggered by thoughts of her mother, who died in a car accident in 1985. She said she learned to channel her emotions with the "bel canto" singing style, which she compared to extreme acting methods. In the middle and at the very end of the video, there is a shot from O'Connor's photo session for the I Do Not Want What I Haven't Got album cover.

The video received its world premiere on MTV's late-night alternative rock program 120 Minutes on January 28, 1990. It won three "Moonmen" at the 1990 MTV Video Music Awards: Video of the Year (O'Connor was the first female artist to be awarded it), Best Female Video and Best Post-Modern Video. It was nominated for Breakthrough Video, Viewer's Choice and International Viewer's Choice during the ceremony. The video was also the subject of many parodies and spoofs, such as Gina Riley's parody "Nothing Is There" on Fast Forward, referring to the fact that O'Connor tended to shave her head bald.

=== Track listings ===
- 7-inch single
1. "Nothing Compares 2 U" – 5:09
2. "Jump in the River" – 4:13
- CD maxi
1. "Nothing Compares 2 U" – 5:09
2. "Jump in the River" – 4:13
3. "Jump in the River" (instrumental) – 4:04

=== Personnel ===
- Sinéad O'Connor – lead vocals, background vocals, producer, mixing
- Nellee Hooper – producing
- Chris Birkett – engineering, mixing
- Dave Burnham assistant mix engineer

=== Legacy ===
==== Impact ====
In 2019, Bill Lamb from About.com wrote that O'Connor's "emotional, gutsy performance made it a classic. Painful loss meets stunning vocal beauty with a perfectly understated instrumental arrangement." In their 2020 retrospective review, Matthew Hocter from Albumism described it as a song "deeply rooted in emotion and despair which would go on to certify O'Connor and that song as one of music history's most unforgettable moments." AllMusic editor Steve Huey called the song "stunning" and noted its "remarkable intimacy".

In 2010, Tom Ewing of Freaky Trigger noted it as a "very moving track", and added that it "captures the stasis, anger and devastation of a bad break-up with awful accuracy." He also complimented the music "whose stately, sympathetic pulse gives O'Connor the canvas she needs to be so devastating." In a 2000 review, Steven Wells from NME said "it remains one of the best 'boo-hoo, my bloke's left me' pop songs ever recorded", and a "stark reminder that O'Connor is blessed with an amazing and unique voice". He concluded with that it "remains the outstanding highlight of her career to date. She's more than capable of surpassing it in the future. Less Sade and more Aretha, please."

In 2009, Mark Richardson from Pitchfork stated that "you have to look pretty hard to find a better expression in pop music of the void that exists when a relationship ends." In a 2015 retrospective review, Pop Rescue wrote that O'Connor "makes light work" of the track, and she's "having plenty of power to belt out the lyrics at the right points." The reviewer added that it is a "fantastic exhibit of 90s music". In 2004, Sal Cinquemani from Slant Magazine felt that it perhaps is O'Connor's "greatest vocal achievement" and described it as a "classic torch song she quite simply owns."

==== Accolades ====
- In 2003, Q magazine ranked "Nothing Compares 2 U" at number 242 in their list of the "1001 Best Songs Ever".
- In 2004, It was included at number 165 by Rolling Stone in its list of the "500 Greatest Songs of All Time"; in 2021, it was moved to number 184.
- In 2007, VH1 ranked it number 10 on "100 Greatest Songs of the 90s".
- In 2008, the song was listed at number 77 on Billboard's "Greatest Songs of All Time".
- In 2010, Pitchfork included the song at number 37 on their Top 200 Tracks of the 90s.
- In 2011, Time magazine included "Nothing Compares 2 U" in its (unranked) list of "All-TIME 100 Songs".
- In 2012, Porcys listed the song at number 60 in their ranking of "100 Singles 1990-1999", noting that "it's probably one of the noblest, most dignified slow songs of the decade".
- In 2019, Stacker placed the song at number 20 in their list of "Best 90s pop songs".
- In 2020, The Guardian ranked the song at number 12 in its list of the "100 Greatest UK No 1s"
- In 2020, Cleveland.com ranked "Nothing Compares 2 U" the best Billboard Hot 100 number-one song of the 1990s in 2020, calling it "one of the greatest love songs ever written".

=== Weekly charts ===
Weekly chart performance for "Nothing Compares 2 U"
Chart (1990)	Peak position
Australia (ARIA)	1
Austria (Ö3 Austria Top 40)	1
Belgium (Ultratop 50 Flanders)	1
Canada Top Singles (RPM)	1
Canada Adult Contemporary (RPM)	1
Denmark (IFPI)	1
Europe (Eurochart Hot 100)	1
Finland (Suomen virallinen lista)	1
France (SNEP)	5
Iceland (Íslenski Listinn)	1
Ireland (IRMA)	1
Italy (Musica e dischi)	1
Italy Airplay (Music & Media)	1
Luxembourg (Radio Luxembourg)	1
Netherlands (Dutch Top 40)	1
Netherlands (Single Top 100)	1
New Zealand (Recorded Music NZ)	1
Norway (VG-lista)	1
Portugal (AFP)	1
Quebec (ADISQ)	1
Spain (AFYVE)	4
Sweden (Sverigetopplistan)	1
Switzerland (Schweizer Hitparade)	1
UK Singles (Official Charts)	1
US Billboard Hot 100	1
US Adult Contemporary (Billboard)	2
US Alternative Airplay (Billboard)	1
US Cash Box Top 100	1
West Germany (GfK)	1

2010 weekly chart performance for "Nothing Compares 2 U"
Chart (2010)	Peak position
Poland Airplay (ZPAV)	1

2011 weekly chart performance for "Nothing Compares 2 U"
Chart (2011)	Peak position
Denmark (Tracklisten)	19

2023 weekly chart performance for "Nothing Compares 2 U"
Chart (2023)	Peak position
Global 200 (Billboard)	118
Ireland (IRMA)	7
Israel (Media Forest)	3
New Zealand Hot Singles (RMNZ)	20
Switzerland (Schweizer Hitparade)	47
UK Singles (Official Charts)	30
UK Indie (Official Charts)	5
US Hot Rock & Alternative Songs (Billboard)	10

=== Year-end charts ===
Year-end chart performance for "Nothing Compares 2 U"
Chart (1990)	Position
Australia (ARIA)	1
Austria (Ö3 Austria Top 40)	2
Belgium (Ultratop)	3
Canada Top Singles (RPM)	3
Canada Adult Contemporary (RPM)	1
Europe (Eurochart Hot 100)	1
Germany (Media Control)	2
Netherlands (Dutch Top 40)	1
Netherlands (Single Top 100)	1
New Zealand (RIANZ)	11
Sweden (Topplistan)	3
Switzerland (Schweizer Hitparade)	6
UK Singles (OCC)	2
US Billboard Hot 100	3
US Adult Contemporary (Billboard)	26
US Modern Rock Tracks (Billboard)	6
US Cash Box Top 100	4

=== Decade-end charts ===
Decade-end chart performance for "Nothing Compares 2 U"
Chart (1990–1999)	Position
Austria (Ö3 Austria Top 40)	65
Belgium (Ultratop 50 Flanders)	40
Netherlands (Dutch Top 40)	60
US Billboard Hot 100	82

=== All-time charts ===
All-time chart performance for "Nothing Compares 2 U"
Chart (1958–2018)	Position
US Billboard Hot 100	97

=== Certifications and sales ===
Certifications and sales for "Nothing Compares 2 U"
Region	Certification	Certified units/sales
Australia (ARIA)	2× Platinum	140,000^{^}
Austria (IFPI Austria)	Platinum	50,000^{*}
Denmark (IFPI Danmark)	Platinum	90,000^{‡}
Germany (BVMI)	Gold	250,000^{^}
Italy (FIMI) sales since 2009	Gold	35,000^{‡}
Netherlands	—	175,000
New Zealand (RMNZ)	Platinum	30,000^{‡}
Spain (Promusicae)	Platinum	60,000^{‡}
Sweden (GLF)	Platinum	50,000^{^}
United Kingdom (BPI) 1990 sales + post 1994 sales	Platinum	1,457,384
United States (RIAA) 1990 sales	Platinum	1,000,000^{^}
United States digital sales	—	1,015,608
Summaries
Worldwide 1990 sales	—	3,500,000
^{*} Sales figures based on certification alone.^{^} Shipments figures based on certification alone.^{‡} Sales+streaming figures based on certification alone.

== Other versions ==
- An orchestral version of the song was featured on Dune's 1997 album Forever.
- In 2006, Scottish singer-songwriter King Creosote released a cover version of the song.
- In 2014, Aretha Franklin released her 38th and final studio album Aretha Franklin Sings the Great Diva Classics in which she covered several songs by other female recording artists, including an upbeat, jazz version of "Nothing Compares 2 U".
- On May 4, 2016, the song was simulcast on radio stations throughout the United States to commemorate Prince 15 days after his death. The simulcast was timed to reflect the song's opening lyric: "It's been 7 hours and 15 days since you took your love away."
- Chris Cornell posted a link to his version the day after Prince's death. In an accompanying message, he wrote: "Prince's music is the soundtrack to the soulful and beautiful universe he created, and we have all been privileged to be part of that amazing world. I performed his song 'Nothing Compares 2 U' for the first time a couple months ago. It has a timeless relevance for me and practically everyone I know. Sadly, now his own lyrics in this song could not be more relevant than at this moment, and I sing them now in reverence as I pay tribute to this unequaled artist who has given all of our lives so much inspiration and made the world so much more interesting. We will miss you Prince!!!" On Father's Day 2018, Cornell's daughter Toni released a version of the song she recorded with her father before his death in 2017. In 2020, the song was covered on Chris Cornell's No One Sings Like You Anymore, Vol. 1.
- In 2016, Madonna performed a rendition of this song alongside "Purple Rain" with Stevie Wonder at that year's Billboard Music Awards.
- Country artist Jon Pardi covered the song on his album Rancho Fiesta Sessions in 2020.
- In 2024, Annie Lennox, accompanied by Wendy & Lisa sang this song at the 2024 Grammy Awards during the "In Memoriam" segment as a tribute to O'Connor. During the performance she had a tear painted on her cheek in homage to a similar scene in the song's music video. She ended the performance by saying "Artists for ceasefire! Peace in the world!" as a response to the 2023 Gaza war ceasefire and the Gaza war. The statement was also seen as a tribute to O'Connor's political outspokenness.
- In 2025 at the Saturday Night Live 50th Anniversary Special the song was performed by Miley Cyrus and Brittany Howard with backing by The Roots.

== See also ==
- List of European number-one airplay songs of the 1990s
