= James P. Leary =

Scandinavian studies professor (born 1950)

James P. Leary is a folklorist and scholar of Scandinavian studies, and a professor at the University of Wisconsin–Madison.

== Personal life ==
Leary was born in Rice Lake, Wisconsin, in August 1950. He is married to Janet C. Gilmore, an associate professor of landscape architecture at the University of Wisconsin–Madison.

== Early life and family ==
Leary graduated in 1968 from Rice Lake High School, where he played tackle for the 1966 Heart o' North championship football team and competed in the state wrestling tournament.

While in high school, he spent a year at Scotch College in Melbourne, Australia. He played loose forward on the rugby team, which won the premiership of Victoria.

His parents and paternal grandparents were journalists, all graduates of the Columbia University School of Journalism, as was his brother Mike, the first third-generation graduate of the school. His father, Warren D Leary Jr., was editor and publisher of the weekly Rice Lake Chronotype, succeeding his grandfather, Warren D Leary, who also served a term in the Wisconsin legislature.

His brother, Mike Leary, was the editor of the San Antonio Express-News, and while at the Philadelphia Inquirer, directed and edited a series on school violence that won the 2012 Pulitzer Prize for public service.

== Career ==
Leary received his B.A. in literature from the University of Notre Dame in 1972. In 1973, he earned his M.A. in folklore from the University of North Carolina. Leary earned his PhD in folklore and American studies from Indiana University Bloomington in 1977. His research focuses on the folklore of the Upper Midwest, especially Scandinavian Americans, indigenous and immigrant people, and rural and working-class peoples. Leary teaches at the University of Wisconsin–Madison in the Scandinavian Studies Department and the Department of Comparative Literature and Folklore Studies. In 2012, he was a Fulbright Scholar in Iceland.

From 1999 to 2009, Leary served as the Director of the Folklore Program (now the Department of Comparative Literature and Folklore Studies) at the University of Wisconsin–Madison. He also co-founded, with Joseph C. Salmons, the Center for the Study of Upper Midwestern Cultures.

Leary has published articles in journals such as Journal of American Folklore, Scandinavian Studies, Journal of the Folklore Institute, and Western Folklore. He has also researched and helped produce several folk life festivals, museum exhibitions, documentary sound recordings, and films, such as The Art of Ironworking. Leary co-produced Down Home Dairyland with Richard March for Wisconsin Public Radio from 1988 to 1995.

In his book, Polkabilly: How the Goose Island Ramblers Redefined American Folk Music, Leary uses the Goose Island Ramblers as a case study to expand what 'traditional American folk music' means and proposes a new genre label called "Polkabilly".

Leary is a Fellow of the American Folklore Society. The Fellows of the American Folklore Society honor folklorists who have made outstanding contributions to the field of folklore.

Together with Thomas A. DuBois, he served as co-editor of the Journal of American Folklore.

Dealing with the era at Notre Dame before coeducation, Leary has contrasted two self-images of the Notre Dame student. They coexist uneasily, the first appearing in official documents the second in popular culture.

Two opposing cultural systems have long coexisted at the University of Notre Dame. The former is normative, overt, official while the latter is deviant, largely covert, and unofficial. Catholicism, academic excellence, and athletics are prominently featured in university publications, in the rhetoric of administrator and alumni, and in serious histories of the campus. Meanwhile, the drunken rowdiness of sex-starved, animalistic dirtballs is confined to dormitory rooms, the talk of students, occasional periods of license, and playful ephemeral publications. Both systems have been integral to the experience of Notre Damers.

== Awards and honors ==
- In 1995, Leary was awarded the Governor's Award for Excellence in Public Humanities Scholarship.
- In 2005, he was awarded the Benjamin A. Botkin Prize for outstanding lifetime achievement in public folklore from the American Folklore Society.
- In 2006, Leary won the Chancellor's Award for Excellence in Teaching.
- In 2007, he was co-winner of the American Folklore Society’s Chicago Folklore Prize for the best book in the field of folklore scholarship for Polkabilly: How the Goose Island Ramblers Redefined American Folk Music.
- In 2011, Leary, along with labor historian Bucky Halker, was awarded an Archie Green Fellowship from the American Folklife Center.
- In 2014, Leary was inducted as a Fellow of the Wisconsin Academy of Sciences, Arts and Letters.
- In 2015, Leary's Folksongs of Another America: Field Recordings from the Upper Midwest, 1937–1946 was nominated for a Grammy in Best Album Notes by the National Academy of Recording Arts & Sciences.
- In 2016, Leary's Folksongs of Another America: Field Recordings from the Upper Midwest, 1937–1946 was awarded the Best Historical Research in Recorded Folk or World Music from the Association for Recorded Sound Collections.
- In 2019, Leary received his second Grammy Award nomination in Best Album Notes for his 60-page booklet accompanying Archeophone Records’ double CD ‘’Alpine Dreaming: The Helvetia Records Story, 1920-1924.’’ The music is from a short-lived Swiss folk record label based in Monroe, Wis.

== Works ==
- Leary, James (1987). From Hardanger to Harleys: A Survey of Wisconsin Folk Art. John Michael Kohler Arts Center. ISBN 978-0932718204. (with Robert T. Teske and Janet C. Gilmore)
- Leary, James (1991). Yodeling in Dairyland: A History of Swiss Music in Wisconsin. University of Wisconsin Press. ISBN 978-0962436925.
- Leary, James (1998). Wisconsin Folklore. University of Wisconsin Press. ISBN 978-0299160340. (ed.)
- Leary, James (2001). So Ole Says to Lena: Folk Humor of the Upper Midwest. University of Wisconsin Press. ISBN 978-0299173746.
- Leary, James (2006). Polkabilly: How the Goose Island Ramblers Redefined American Folk Music. Oxford University Press. ISBN 0199756961.
- Dorson, Richard M. (2008). Bloodstoppers and Bearwalkers: Folk Traditions of Michigan's Upper Peninsula. University of Wisconsin Press. ISBN 978-0299227142. (ed.)
- Leary, James (2015). Folksongs of Another America: Field Recordings from the Upper Midwest, 1937–1946. University of Wisconsin Press. ISBN 978-0299301507.
