= Jeanne Arland Peterson =

American singer

Jeanne Arland Peterson (c. 1922 – June 23, 2013) was an American singer and pianist who was considered by some the "first lady of jazz" in Minneapolis–Saint Paul. She was inducted into two Minnesota halls of fame.

== Early years ==
The daughter of a father and mother who were both pianists, Peterson was born in Minneapolis, She began playing piano by ear at age 3 and later took lessons "to learn the names of the chords she had been playing." When she was 15, she had two part-time jobs—playing sheet music at Dayton's department store and singing in bars with a group that included her brother.

Peterson was a graduate of North Highschool in Minneapolis.

== Career ==
Peterson's early professional experience came as a singer on radio station WCCO, where she performed for 20 years, and on television stations WCCO and KSTP, all in Minneapolis-St. Paul. In the early 1940s, she was the featured female vocalist with Sev Olsen's orchestra.

Although pianist Marian McPartland and others encouraged Peterson to move to New York City to advance her career, she chose to stay in the Twin Cities and raise her children, even turning down a job offer from the leader of a big band.

After Peterson's husband died on the opening day of the Minnesota Twins' 1969 season, she took his place playing the organ for the team's home games. She also took over the booking agency that he had run and began singing for pay at parties and other social events.

In the early 1990s, Peterson and daughter Patty performed as a jazz duet, primarily at the Dakota Bar & Grill in St. Paul. They recorded an album in 1992.

== Personal life ==
Peterson was married to Willie Peterson, who was a bandleader, booking agent, and pianist. They had six children, five of whom.became professional musicians. He died in 1969.

== Death ==
On June 23, 2013, Peterson died at a nursing home in Eden Prairie, Minnesota, at age 91.

== Recognition ==
In 1992, Peterson was inducted into the Minnesota Music Hall of Fame. That was followed by her 2005 induction into the Minnesota Broadcasting Hall of Fame.
