= Surfin' Bird =

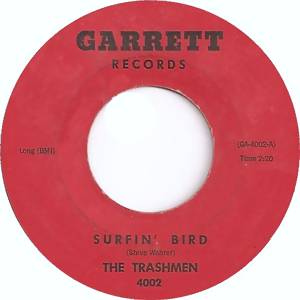
- Label art for the 7-inch single "Surfin' Bird", with the original songwriting credit.

Single by the Trashmen

from the album Surfin' Bird
- B-side: "King of the Surf"
- Released: November 13, 1963
- Recorded: September 1963
- Studio: Kay Bank Studios, Minneapolis, Minnesota
- Genre: Surf rock; garage rock; proto-punk
- Length: 2:20
- Label: Garrett
- Songwriters: Al Frazier; Carl White; Sonny Harris; Turner Wilson Jr.
- Producer: Jack Bates

The Trashmen singles chronology
"Surfin' Bird" (1963)	"Bird Dance Beat" (1964)

"Surfin' Bird" is a song performed by American surf rock band the Trashmen, containing the repetitive lyric "the bird is the word". It has been covered many times. The song is a combination of two R&B hits by the Rivingtons: "Papa-Oom-Mow-Mow" and "The Bird's the Word".

The song was released as a single in 1963 and reached Number 4 on the Billboard Hot 100. The Trashmen also recorded an album named after the track, released two months later.

== History ==
The Rivingtons followed up their 1962 Billboard Hot 100 hit "Papa-Oom-Mow-Mow" with the similar "The Bird's the Word" in 1963. The Trashmen had not heard this version, but saw a band called the Sorensen Brothers playing it and decided to play the song that night at their own gig. During this first performance, drummer and vocalist Steve Wahrer stopped playing and ad-libbed the "Surfin' Bird" middle section. Despite the Trashmen's not knowing "The Bird's the Word" was a Rivingtons song, the similarity to "Papa-Oom-Mow-Mow" was obvious, and the band added the chorus to the end of their new track.

A local disc jockey, Bill Diehl, was at the gig and convinced the band to record the track. It was recorded at Kay Bank Studios in Minneapolis. Diehl entered it into a local battle of the bands competition, and it won. It was then sent to a battle of the bands competition in Chicago, which it also won. This led to the group being signed to Garrett Records, with the single being quickly released. It reportedly sold 30,000 copies in its first weekend before going on to national success, reaching No. 4 on the Billboard Hot 100. Wahrer was originally credited as the song's writer, but that was changed to the Rivingtons (Al Frazier, Carl White, Sonny Harris, and Turner Wilson Jr.) after the group threatened to sue the Trashmen for plagiarism.

== Chart performance ==
=== Weekly charts ===
Chart (1963–1964)	Peak position
CAN CHUM Chart	2
US Billboard Hot 100	4
US Cash Box Top 100	4
Chart (2009)	Peak position
UK Singles Chart	50
Chart (2010)	Peak position
UK Singles (Official Charts)	3
UK Indie (Official Charts)	1

=== Year-end charts ===
Chart (1964)	Position
US Billboard Hot 100	75
US Cash Box Top 100	62

== Certifications ==
Region	Certification	Certified units/sales
United Kingdom (BPI)	Silver	200,000^{‡}
^{‡} Sales+streaming figures based on certification alone.

== Covers ==
- "Surfin' Bird" was covered by the Cramps as their 1978 debut single on Vengeance Records; it also appeared on their 1979 album Gravest Hits and on their 1983 compilation album Off the Bone. The Cramps often ended their concerts with the song.
- The Bird was sampled and released in a happy hardcore version by Charly Lownoise and Mental Theo as single in 1993.
- "Surfin' Bird" was covered by the Ramones on their album Rocket to Russia, released on November 4, 1977.
- "Surfin' Bird" was covered by Teutonic thrash metal band Sodom in 2001 on their tenth studio album, M-16.
- "Surfin' Bird" was covered by Silverchair for the compilation album Music for Our Mother Ocean Volume 1, released on July 2, 1996.
- "Surfin' Bird" was covered by the Speakers on their first album, The Speakers, released in 1966.
- "Surfin' Bird" was covered by Cal Dodd as the theme song for Birdz.

== In popular culture ==
The song has been used in various films, including Pink Flamingos (1972), Back to the Beach (1987), Full Metal Jacket (1987), Home for the Holidays (1995), Fred Claus (2007), The Villain (2009), The Big Year (2011) and Woody Woodpecker (2017).

"Surfin' Bird" was frequently played on Detroit radio and TV stations over the summer of 1976 during segments featuring the Tigers' 21-year old rookie sensation Mark Fidrych. Fidrych was nicknamed "The Bird" because of his supposed resemblance to Sesame Street's Big Bird character, and because of his cartoonish antics on the mound, which included talking to the ball between pitches. Fidrych was named American League Rookie of the Year in 1976, and finished second in the voting for the American League Cy Young Award.

A cover of "Surfin' Bird" was used in the first episode of the 1989 series The Super Mario Bros. Super Show!, "The Bird! The Bird!" As with all cover songs from the show, later releases of the episode replaced the song with generic music. A separate cover of the song was also the theme song of the 1998 animated series Birdz.

The song is prominently featured in the 2008 Family Guy season 7 episode "I Dream of Jesus", in which Peter Griffin (Seth MacFarlane) overhears the song at a diner and remembers it as his favorite childhood song. He proceeds to annoy his family by taking the record from the diner and playing the song virtually nonstop for the rest of the episode. "Surfin' Bird" has since become a recurring gag on the show.
