= The Castaways (band) =

American rock band

- Origin: Minneapolis/St. Paul, Minnesota, United States
- Genre: Garage rock
- Years active: 1963–1968, 1970s–2025
- Label: Soma
- Past members: Jim Donna; Dennis Craswell; Robert Folschow; Dick Roby; Roy Hensley; Tom Husting; Dennis Libby; Dave Maetzold; Bob Donna; Rick Snider; Ralph Hintz
- Website: thecastawaysrock.com the-castaway.com

The Castaways were an American rock band from the Twin Cities in Minnesota, United States. They were formed in 1963.

The band's only hit single was "Liar, Liar". Written by keyboardist and band leader Jim Donna and drummer (and band co-founder) Dennis Craswell, the song was produced by Timothy D. Kehr and released by Soma Records, reaching number 12 on the Billboard Hot 100 chart in 1965. "Liar, Liar" was later featured in the films Good Morning, Vietnam and Lock, Stock and Two Smoking Barrels and was covered by Debbie Harry in Married to the Mob. The Castaways performed "Liar, Liar" in the 1967 beach movie, It's a Bikini World. Their follow up, "Goodbye Babe", was another local hit, but did not break nationally.

Although the group released several more singles throughout the 1960s, they never released an album, until the appearance of their 1999 greatest hits compilation.

The last version of the band ceased performing in late 2025.

== History ==
The original members were Jim Donna on keyboards, Robert Folschow and Roy Hensley on guitars, Dick Roby on bass guitar and vocals, and Dennis Craswell on drums. Folschow sang the distinctive falsetto vocal on "Liar, Liar", and Dick Roby contributed the scream.

In 1966 Jim Donna left the band. Bob Folschow ended up being drafted into the army; the band ended up breaking up two years after this in 1968. Jim Donna restarted The Castaways in the 1970s with new members.

Following the dissolution of the band, original drummer Dennis Craswell (co-author of the song "Liar Liar"), went on to join Crow, a Minneapolis-based rock band of the late 1960s and early 1970s. and now plays under the name: The Original Castaways (summers) and plays under the name: The Castaway in the Rio Grande Valley playing dances in the 55+ parks, and on South Padre Island (winters).

In the early 1980s, Folschow and Craswell led a West Coast version of the band under the name The Castaways in Pismo Beach, California. Folschow, who was using the stage name of Bob LaRoy, played guitar and a keytar on many songs, including "Liar, Liar". At some point, this lineup also included fellow original members Roby and Hensley, leaving Donna as the only original member not participating.

Rhythm guitarist Roy Hensley (born on 31 December 1947) died on 8 June 2005, at the age of 57, and was buried in Lewisville, Minnesota.

In 2006, all five members of the classic Castaways lineup were inducted into the Iowa Rock and Roll Hall of Fame, with the group's former producer, Timothy B. Kehr accepting the award on behalf of posthumous inductee Hensley.

The Castaways, with original band leader Jim Donna, continued to perform for fairs, festivals, and private events in the upper Midwest. The line up consisted of Bob Donna on Guitar and vocals, Rick Snider on the drums and vocals, Ralph Hintz on bass guitar and vocals and Jim Donna on the keyboards.

In 2022 Jim Donna wrote a book about The Castaways called, Liar, Liar From Garage Band to Rockstars, the Story of Minnesota's Castaways in the 1960's.

On April 25th, 2025, the modern version of The Castaways were inducted into the Minnesota Music Hall of Fame. The inductees were Jim Donna, Bob Donna, Ralph Hintz, Rick Snider, along with prior member Dave Maetzold. Legacy members Dennis Craswell, Roy Hensley, Greg Maland, Dennis Libby, Logan Stewart, and Tom Husting, were also inducted.

In 2025, after more than 50 years of performances, The Castaways officially retired from performing shows, with their final show occurring on October 11, 2025.

== Discography ==
Singles

- "Liar, Liar" / "Sam" (1965)
- "Goodbye Babe" / "A Man's Gotta Be a Man" (1965)
- "She's a Girl in Love" / "Why This Should Happen to Me" (1967)
- "I Feel So Fine" / "Hit the Road Jack" (1967)
- "Walking in Different Circles" / "Just on High" (1968)
- "Bad Hair Day" Dennis Craswell and Roy Hensley
- "Lavender Popcorn" / "What Kind of Face" (1968)
