= Papa-Oom-Mow-Mow =

Single by The Rivingtons

from the album Doin' the Bird
- B-side: "Deep Water"
- Released: March 16, 1962
- Recorded: February 1962
- Studio: Radio Recorders, Hollywood, California
- Genre: Novelty; doo-wop
- Length: 2:17
- Label: Liberty
- Songwriters: Carl White; Al Frazier; Sonny Harris; Turner Wilson Jr.
- Producer: Adam Ross

The Rivingtons singles chronology
"Papa-Oom-Mow-Mow" (1962)	"Kickapoo Joy Juice" (1963)

Official audio
- "Papa-Oom-Mow-Mow" on YouTube

"Papa-Oom-Mow-Mow" is a novelty nonsensical doo-wop song released by the Rivingtons in 1962. It peaked at number 48 on the Billboard Hot 100, and number 35 on the Cashbox charts. The band released two similar follow-up songs over the next several months, "Mama-Oom-Mow-Mow (The Bird)" and "The Bird's the Word".

== "Surfin' Bird" ==
Together with the Rivingtons' 1963 novelty song "The Bird's the Word", "Papa-Oom-Mow-Mow" was the basis for the song "Surfin' Bird", a number four hit in 1963 by The Trashmen. The combination of the songs, played at a much livelier pace than the original doo-wop songs, was ad-libbed at an early live performance by the band and later released as a single. Initially, the single did not credit the original songwriters, but after the Rivingtons asked for their copyright to be respected, the songwriting credits were amended.

The Trashmen's follow-up single "Bird Dance Beat" referenced "Surfin' Bird" in the lyrics and featured several sections of the "Papa-Oom-Mow-Mow" syllables.

== Cover versions ==
- In 1963 the song was covered in French by Les Célibataires EP on BARCLAY - 70554
- The song was later covered by the Beach Boys for their first live album, Beach Boys Concert, in 1964—this track entering the Philippines top 10 in February 1966 according to Billboard—and, again sung by Brian Wilson, on their album Beach Boys' Party! in 1965. The track was also included on the Music for Pleasure compilation album The Beach Boys Good Vibrations released in the UK in the 1970s.
- In 1965 it was covered by the Filipino rock band The Hi-Jacks as "Pa Pa Ou Mau Mau", with the single reaching No. 7 in Hong Kong's national record chart.
- In 1967 the Freshmen scored a Top 10 hit with the song in Ireland.
- The composition was also covered in 1966 by the Thunderbirds, a Hong-Kong band headed by Robert Lee, the brother of martial-arts star Bruce Lee.
- The Deviants covered the song on their 1968 album Disposable. It was renamed as Pappa Oo Mao Mao.
- Gary Glitter's 1975 version of "Papa-Oom-Mow-Mow" made the UK Top 40, but was his first non-Top 10 single after 11 consecutive Top 10 hits.
- The Sharonettes released a cover version also in 1975, which reached no.26 in the UK charts.
- The song was performed by The California Raisins in the 1988 television special Meet the Raisins!.
- The song was featured in the 1989 television movie pilot episode Nick Knight starring Rick Springfield as a centuries-old vampire working as a police detective in modern-day Los Angeles.
- Clifford, Kermit the Frog, and the Giant Clams (voiced by Rockapella) later covered the song on the 1993 album Muppet Beach Party.
- An arrangement of "Papa-Oom-Mow-Mow" by the Persuasions was released on their 1977 album Chirpin' and was played in the film E.T. the Extra-Terrestrial for 35 seconds. In 2011, a version performed by a choir was used in the film Happy Feet Two.
- New wave band João Penca e Seus Miquinhos Amestrados recorded a version in the 1990s.
- Super Ratones, a Rock and roll band from Argentina, recorded their version on their 1990 debut album "Rock de la playa".
- The Delltones released a contemporary version of ("Papa-Oom-Mow-Mow") on their 1984 Album ("Tickled Pink")

== Other appearances of the song's lyrics ==
The title of the song is quoted in background lyrics of the song "Summer Nights" from the musical Grease: in fact, the appearance of the lyrics, which were written in 1962, in a song set in fall 1958 creates one of several anachronisms present in the musical.

In 1964, surf rockers Jan and Dean reworked the song into "The New Girl in School", with new lyrics and the refrain "Doo-ron-de-ron-de" substituted for "Papa-Oom-Mow-Mow". "New Girl in School" garnered significant U.S. airplay as the B-side of the Top 40 hit "Dead Man's Curve". In 1969, the song's distinctive titular nonsense lyrics appeared as a similarly sung chorus in Giorgio Moroder's first single "Looky Looky". Al Frazier was a member of The Rivingtons and is listed as a co-author of "Papa Oom Now Now"; it has been erroneously reported over the years that he and Dallas Frazier were the same person.

The "Papa oom mow mow" lyric appears in the final repeating refrain of Neil Sedaka's 1975 single "The Queen Of 1964". The Oak Ridge Boys' 1981 hit "Elvira" has an "Oom-papa-mow-mow" chorus, an element that existed in songwriter Dallas Frazier's 1967 original version of the song. Garage rock band Nobunny added the song's lyrics at the end of their hit "I Am a Girlfriend", released in 2008. Heavy metal artist Rob Zombie repeatedly uses the song's title in the chorus of his song "Burn", which is the 8th track off of his solo 2010 album Hellbilly Deluxe 2. It also appears during the entirety of the song "La Rubia Tarada" from the Argentine rock band Sumo.

The song is also featured in Steven Spielberg's E.T. the Extra-Terrestrial (1982), in the scene where Elliot sits with his brother's friends while ordering a pizza; they are trying to request the song on a phone call to a radio station, and the echo refrain of the song playing can be heard before Elliot first encounters ET in his family's backyard.

The song was referenced in the name of Pizza Oom Mow Mow, a former quick-service restaurant at Disney California Adventure which opened with the park in 2001 that served a variety of pizzas and was themed to the surfer culture of California. This restaurant closed in 2010 and was replaced with Boardwalk Pizza & Pasta in 2011 as part of a retheming of the land Pizza Oom Mow Mow sat on.

Gary Glitter's cover version of Papa Oom Mow Mow was featured in the series Gotham in season 3 episode 13 titled Smile Like You Mean It.
