= The Rivingtons =

American band

- Also known as: The Atlantics
- Origin: Los Angeles, California, U.S.A.
- Genres: Pop; doo-wop
- Labels: Liberty Records; Warner Bros. Records; BVM Records
- Past members: Carl White; Al Frazier; Sonny Harris; Turner "Rocky" Wilson Jr.; Madero White; Clay Hammond

The Rivingtons were a 1960s doo-wop band, known for their 1962 novelty hit "Papa-Oom-Mow-Mow". The members were lead vocalist Carl White (June 21, 1932 – January 7, 1980), tenor Al Frazier (died November 13, 2005), baritone Sonny Harris and bass Turner "Rocky" Wilson Jr. Frazier was replaced by Madero White for a period in the late 1970s.

== History ==
The Rivingtons had originally been known as The Sharps and had success in the charts with Thurston Harris's "Little Bitty Pretty One" in 1957. They then appeared on Duane Eddy's 1958 hit "Rebel-'Rouser", providing handclaps and rebel yells. They also recorded on Warner Brothers Records as The Crenshaws in 1961.

Their first hit as the Rivingtons was "Papa-Oom-Mow-Mow" (Liberty #55427, 1962). Like many such songs, it began with the bass chanting nonsense syllables (in this case the title), followed by the tenor singing over repetitions of it. "Mama-Oom-Mow-Mow", an even more baroque rewrite of the theme, failed to sell, but they returned to the charts the following year with "The Bird's the Word". The B-side of "Mama-Oom-Mow-Mow" was "Waiting" (Liberty #55528).

After their two hit singles, the Rivingtons struggled to hit the charts. However, "Papa-Oom-Mow-Mow" and "The Bird's the Word" were revived in 1963, thanks to a Minnesota-based group called The Trashmen recording "Surfin' Bird", made up from the Rivingtons' songs' nonsense syllables. The Trashmen made it in a record shop and failed to properly credit the Rivingtons. "Surfin' Bird" was a medley of the Rivingtons' choruses minus the verses. The Rivingtons' manager reported it to their lawyers, and the Trashmen were ordered to add the surnames of the Rivingtons to the credits. Because of the publicity in Billboard, the Trashmen had to share the writing credits on the recording and on a later version as a sign of good faith. "Surfin' Bird" itself was revived in the late 1970s by The Ramones and The Cramps.

The Rivingtons recorded several more songs in the 1960s, but their recording career ended after the Columbia single "A Rose Growing in the Ruins" failed to sell. They began performing live again in the 1970s, with Madero White replacing Al Frazier.

Carl White died of acute tonsillitis at age 47 in his Los Angeles home. Al Frazier, Sonny Harris and Rocky Wilson played the oldies circuit extensively throughout the 1980s, replacing White with Clay Hammond until 1987, then Andrew Butler into the 1990s. In 1989, the Rivingtons appeared in an episode of L.A. Law as a doo-wop group, "The Sensations". They were later featured in a 1990 episode of Night Court, "Razing Bull", as Mac's former group-mates "The Starlites".

== Discography ==
The Rivingtons released a number of records on the Liberty label, including:

=== Singles ===
- "Papa-Oom-Mow-Mow" b/w "Deep Water" (#48 US)
- "Kickapoo Joy Juice" b/w "My Reward"
- "Mama-Oom-Mow-Mow (The Bird)" b/w "Waiting" (#106 US)
- "The Bird's the Word" b/w "I'm Losing My Grip" (#52 US, #27 R&B)
- "The Shaky Bird (Part 1)" b/w "The Shaky Bird (Part 2)"
- "Cherry" b/w "Little Sally Walker"
- "The Weejee Walk" b/w "Fairy Tales"

=== Albums ===
- Doin' the Bird (1962)

=== Compilation albums ===
These songs are all collected on The Liberty Years, released on EMI America.
