= Soma Records (U.S. label) =

Defunct American record label

Soma Records was an American record label based in Minneapolis, Minnesota. Founded by Amos Heilicher in 1954, the business name is an ananym of Amoswards. Heilicher, along with his brother Danny, was also in the jukebox and wholesale record distribution businesses, and owned the Musicland chain of retail music stores.

== History ==
Soma Records was founded in Minnesota in 1954 by Amos Heilicher, a record distributor from Musicland retail chain and the namesake (in the form of an ananym (his name spelt backwards)). "Soma" initially recorded polka, jazz, country and western, and old time music. The first hit single was Bobby Vee's "Suzie Baby" in 1959, which was sold to Liberty Records distributed nationally. Other hits included "Mule Skinner Blues" by The Fendermen (purchased from Wisconsin's Cuca label), "Liar, Liar" by The Castaways, and "Run, Run, Run" by The Gestures. "Surfin' Bird" by The Trashmen was recorded by Garrett Records, whose operator George Garrett was an audio engineer behind the mixing console at Kay Bank Studios, which was partially owned by Amos Heilicher; Soma recorded many local and regional rock groups during the 1960s at Kay Bank Studios, including The Accents, Gregory Dee and The Avanties, The Underbeats, and The Del Counts, as well as distributing other smaller labels (such as Garrett, Bangar, Golden Ring and Studio City). Country singer Dave Dudley's first album, containing his biggest hit "Six Days on the Road", was released on Golden Ring Records in 1963, and distributed by Soma until Mercury Records bought the rights. Soma distributed Dick Allison and Ron Thompson and his Rowdy Guitar, both of whom were members of the Nebraska doo-wop and vocal group known for a rockabilly instrumental, Switchblade.

Soma continued releasing recordings until 1967, when the co-owned record distributing company was merged into Pickwick Records. The Heilicher brothers exited the recorded music business in 1977.
