= Sinéad O'Connor on Saturday Night Live =

1992 TV protest by Irish singer-songwriter

O'Connor tearing up a photograph of Pope John Paul II on live television in 1992

On October 3, 1992, the Irish singer-songwriter Sinéad O'Connor appeared as the musical guest on the American live television sketch comedy show Saturday Night Live (SNL). While performing a rendition of Bob Marley's 1976 song "War", she staged a protest against the Catholic Church. O'Connor held a photograph of Pope John Paul II in front of the camera, ripped it up, said "fight the real enemy", and threw the pieces of the photograph onto the floor.

In an interview a few weeks after the performance, O'Connor said she held the Catholic Church responsible for physical, sexual and emotional abuse she had suffered as a child. She also said that the Church had destroyed "entire races of people", and that Catholic priests had been beating and sexually abusing children for years. O'Connor's performance took place nine years before John Paul II publicly acknowledged child sexual abuse in the Catholic Church.

The protest triggered thousands of complaints from viewers. It attracted criticism from the Catholic Church, the Anti-Defamation League, and celebrities, including Catholics Joe Pesci and Madonna, who both mocked the performance on SNL later that season. Two weeks after her SNL appearance, O'Connor was booed at the 30th-anniversary tribute concert for Bob Dylan at Madison Square Garden in New York City.

O'Connor said she did not regret her act, as she felt miscast in the role of a pop star: she saw herself instead as a protest singer. After the Catholic Church's cover-up of abuse became public, opinion shifted in support toward O'Connor, especially after her death in 2023.

== Background ==
In her 2021 memoir, Rememberings, O'Connor wrote that she was regularly beaten by her mother, who also taught her to steal from the collection plate at Mass and from charity tins. In 1979, at age 13, O'Connor went to live with her father. At the age of 15, following acts of shoplifting and truancy, she was placed for 18 months in the Grianán Training Centre, run by the Order of Our Lady of Charity. She later attended Maryfield College in Drumcondra, and Newtown School in Waterford for fifth and sixth year as a boarder, but did not sit the Leaving Certificate in 1985.

In 1985, O’Connor moved from Dublin to London. She lived near Portobello Road Market and befriended members of the local Rastafarian community. The "oppositional inclinations of Rasta chants and rebel songs" influenced her philosophy and artistic output, including the song "Black Boys on Mopeds", a commentary on Thatcher-era England released on her second album, I Do Not Want What I Haven't Got (1990).

In May 1990, O'Connor canceled an appearance on the American television show Saturday Night Live (SNL) when she learnt it was to be hosted by Andrew Dice Clay, who she felt was disrespectful to women. She had been previously criticized for refusing to allow "The Star-Spangled Banner" to be played before one of her shows in New Jersey. Later that year, when she won three 1990 MTV Video Music Awards, O'Connor made a speech "connect[ing] her experience [of radio censorship] with the industry's censorship of black artists".

On September 29, 1990, O'Connor was the musical guest for the SNL season 16 premiere, with the host Kyle MacLachlan. She performed "Three Babies" and "The Last Day of Our Acquaintance". She boycotted the 33rd Annual Grammy Awards, which were held in February 1991, and refused to accept the Grammy Award she won a few months later, after writing a letter to the Recording Academy criticizing the music industry as materialistic. O'Connor, who was raised Catholic, also criticized the Catholic Church for its positions on birth control and divorce, and in 1992 forced her way into the Dáil Éireann (Irish parliament) to speak to Taoiseach (prime minister) Albert Reynolds regarding the X Case, in which a 14-year-old rape victim sought an abortion. Daniel Glass, an executive at O'Connor's record label, said that by 1992 she was "not getting a lot of love [...] She was controversial, she hadn't had a hit in a while."

== Performance ==
On October 3, 1992, O'Connor appeared on the second episode of the 18th season of SNL to promote her new album, Am I Not Your Girl?. She performed two songs, the first of which was her single "Success Has Made a Failure of Our Home". This inspired two influential alternative rock radio figures in the studio to tell Glass that they would be adding it to their playlists.

For the second song, O'Connor performed an a cappella version of Bob Marley's 1976 song "War", wearing a necklace with the Rastafari star and a scarf with the Rastafari and Ethiopian colours. The original lyrics are based on a speech given by Haile Selassie in 1968; O'Connor replaced Selassie's references to the political situation in Angola, Mozambique and South Africa with lyrics related to child abuse. Throughout the performance, she stared intently into the camera. As she sang the final line, "we have confidence in the victory of good over evil", O'Connor held a photograph of Pope John Paul II in front of the camera, ripped it up, said "fight the real enemy", and threw the pieces of the photograph onto the floor.

O'Connor said that the photograph, taken during John Paul II's 1979 visit to Ireland, had hung in her mother's bedroom until her death when O'Connor was 18. Since then, she had been waiting for the right moment to destroy it. She said she took the idea of ripping it up on-camera from the Boomtown Rats, whose lead singer, Bob Geldof, had shredded a photo of John Travolta and Olivia Newton-John on the British television program Top of the Pops in 1978 after their single reached number one on the UK charts, beating the song "Summer Nights" from the Grease soundtrack which was a number one for seven weeks. It was the first UK number one for an Irish rock group and the first number one for any punk or new wave act.

The SNL producers were not aware of O'Connor's plan; during the dress rehearsal, she had held up a picture of a refugee child. Glass said that everyone at SNL "froze" after the live performance, unsure how to react, and that the music producer Liz Welch "went from jubilation to tears". The NBC vice president of late-night television, Rick Ludwin, recalled that when he saw what O'Connor had done, he jumped out of the chair he was sitting in. The executive producer, Lorne Michaels, said "the air went out the studio" and that he ordered that the applause sign should not be used. The audience remained silent, and O'Connor returned to her dressing room, where Glass found her "talking to herself [...] doing something between poetry and chanting".

A piece of the ripped photo was picked up by SNL cast member David Spade. The day after, the producer Ken Aymong asked Spade to hand his piece back. The other parts were collected by a crew member, who sold them to Inside Edition for $10,000.

== Reactions ==
A nationwide audience saw O'Connor's live performance, which the New York Daily News's front page dubbed a "Holy Terror". NBC received more than 500 calls on Sunday followed by 400 more on Monday, with all but seven criticizing O'Connor. It received 4,400 calls in total. Contrary to rumor, NBC was not fined by the Federal Communications Commission, which has no regulatory power over such behavior. NBC did not edit the performance out of the West Coast tape-delayed broadcast that night, nor did they ever invite O'Connor to perform on the show again.

External videos
- Footage of Joe Pesci's monologue featuring the taped-up photo and the comments about O'Connor.

On stage during the goodnights, O'Connor was ignored by host Tim Robbins (a devout Catholic), who refused to acknowledge her, and the show's cast. The following week's episode was hosted by the actor Joe Pesci, who was raised Catholic. Holding up the photo O'Connor had torn up, he explained that he had taped it back together, to applause. He added that if she had appeared on an episode he was hosting, he would have "grabbed her by the eyebrows" and "would have gave [sic] her such a smack".

Criticism continued in the following days. The Catholic cardinal Bernard Francis Law called on NBC to apologize for "a gesture of hate acted out before millions" while also stating that O'Connor deserved love, pity, and forgiveness. The Anti-Defamation League condemned O'Connor, and misconstrued her Rasta emblem as a Jewish symbol. Joseph Swilling of the New York Post described the protest as "an act of hatred and intolerance" that promoted violence. A steamroller, operated by what O'Connor described as "intensely angry old people", crushed her records in front of the headquarters of her record label. She received support from some members of the Rastafari community and the Chicago Sun-Times columnist Richard Roeper, among others.

O'Connor initially planned to hold a press conference in London, but feared this would become a media circus. Instead, she sent a letter to several major news organisations. Tying in her experiences to victims of Catholic colonialism and persecution, she wrote that she had suffered childhood abuse due to the "history of my people, whose identity and culture were taken away from them by the British with full permission from the "Holy" Roman Empire. Which they gave for money and in the name of Jesus Christ", and added "the story of my people is the story of the African people, the Jewish people, the Amer-Indian people, the South American people [...] the story of countless millions of children whose families and nations were torn apart for money in the name of Jesus Christ".

=== Madonna ===
The American singer Madonna, who like Robbins and Pesci, was raised Catholic, appeared on SNL later that season. After performing her single "Bad Girl", she held up a picture of the sex offender Joey Buttafuoco, said "fight the real enemy", and tore it up. Madonna criticized O'Connor in The Irish Times, saying that dialogue was better than performance art to express any problems she had with the Church.

In an interview with Bob Guccione Jr. a year earlier, O'Connor had mentioned that despite Madonna being admired as a campaigner for women's rights, she had "slagged [me] off", saying "I look like I had a run-in with a lawn mower and that I was about as sexy as a venetian blind". In a 1993 editorial, Guccione called Madonna's newly refound faith "convenient" and ascribed her criticism of O'Connor to opportunism, as she sought to stay in the news while promoting her album Erotica and her book Sex, both of which he panned. The New York Times journalist Jon Pareles wrote that Madonna's response "may have been professional jealousy" after O'Connor "stole the spotlight" from her.

=== Bob Dylan tribute concert ===
Two weeks after her appearance on Saturday Night Live, O'Connor performed at the 30th-anniversary tribute concert for Bob Dylan at Madison Square Garden in New York City. On stage, the actor and country singer Kris Kristofferson introduced her as an "artist whose name has become synonymous with courage and integrity". The audience booed as O'Connor stood with her head bowed. Kristofferson was supposed to lead her off the stage, but instead whispered to her: "Don't let the bastards get you down", to which she replied: "I'm not down".

The band began the song O'Connor was scheduled to perform, Dylan's 1979 song "I Believe in You", but O'Connor waved them off and began singing "War" a cappella instead, as she had done on SNL, in response to the crowd. She left the stage in tears and was comforted by Kristofferson. Her performance was not included on the live album of the event.

== Legacy ==
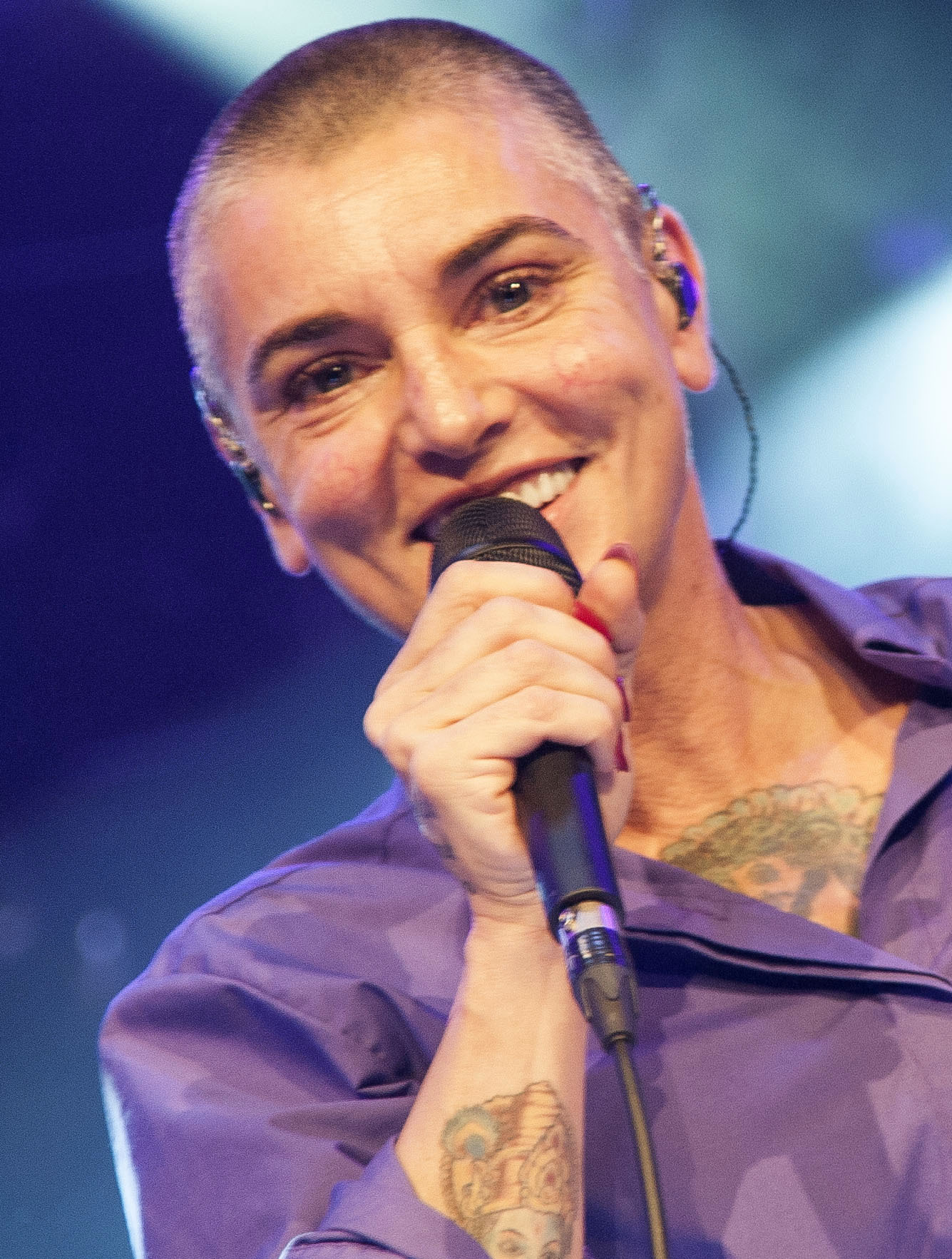
O'Connor performing in 2014

The Saturday Night Live incident damaged O'Connor's television opportunities, career, and public reputation. In 2010, O'Connor said she had wanted to "force a conversation where there was a need for one", which she felt was "part of being an artist". In her 2021 memoir, Rememberings, O'Connor wrote that she was "a protest singer" and that she was "not a pop star", but "a troubled soul who needs to scream into mikes now and then".

O'Connor repeatedly asserted that she did not regret her act. In her memoir, she wrote that it had put her "back on the right track" following a personal crisis stemming from the success of her 1990 single "Nothing Compares 2 U".

After the abuses hidden by the Catholic Church became public, opinion towards O'Connor changed. The New York Times journalist Amanda Hess wrote in 2021 that "few cultural castaways have been more vindicated by the passage of time", and that the backlash was also "about the kinds of provocations we accept from women in music". After O'Connor died in 2023, Glass wrote that she had been unfairly treated and had never recovered professionally from having been "totally cancelled".

Kris Kristofferson released a song in tribute to O'Connor, "Sister Sinéad", on his 2009 album Closer to the Bone. In 2020, Time published a list of the most influential women of the 20th century and named O'Connor the most influential woman of 1992. The filmmaker Olivia Wilde wrote that "she remains an example of the power of provoking necessary, if unpopular, conversations—and the courage it takes to do so".

In the first episode of SNL aired after O'Connor's death, a Weekend Update segment briefly referenced the incident as an example of a great musical performance. Kenan Thompson, in character as American football player Deion Sanders, called O'Connor a "brave lady". NBC did not rebroadcast the live performance unedited until 2025, when it was featured in the documentary Ladies & Gentlemen... 50 Years of SNL Music. In the documentary, Michaels said he had "admired the bravery of what she'd done, and also the absolute sincerity of it". That year, a reproduction of the ripped photo featured in the Rock and Roll Hall of Fame exhibition and at the Michaels exhibition at Harry Ransom Center.
