= Queen of Denmark (disambiguation) =

A Queen of Denmark is a female Danish monarch.

Queen of Denmark may also refer to:

- Queen consort of Denmark, the wife of a reigning King of Denmark
- Queen of Denmark (album), a 2010 album by John Grant
- "Queen of Denmark", song from the above album, covered by Sinéad O'Connor on her 2012 album How About I Be Me (and You Be You)?
