= Sinéad O'Connor =

Irish singer and songwriter (1966–2023)

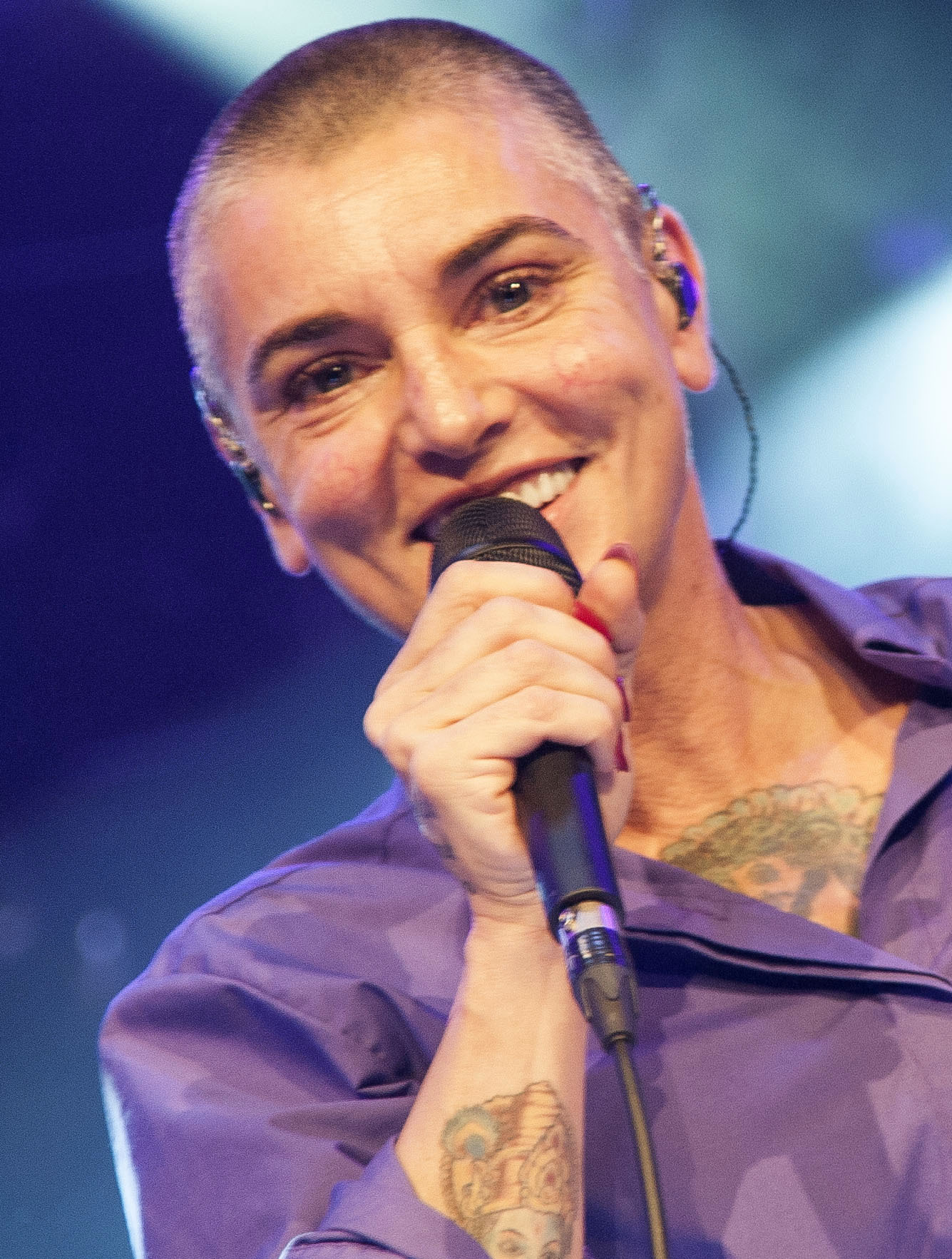
- O'Connor performing in 2014
- Born: Sinéad Marie Bernadette O'Connor; 8 December 1966; Dublin, Ireland
- Died: 26 July 2023 (aged 56); London, England
- Burial place: Dean's Grange Cemetery
- Other names: Mother Bernadette Mary; Magda Davitt; Shuhada' Sadaqat
- Occupations: Singer; songwriter; activist
- Years active: 1984–2023
- Works: Discography
- Spouses: John Reynolds (m. 1989; div. 1991) Nick Sommerlad (m. 2001; div. 2003) Steve Cooney (m. 2010; div. 2011) Barry Herridge (m. 2011)
- Children: 4
- Relatives: Joseph O'Connor (brother)
- Musical career
- Genres: Alternative rock; pop rock; folk rock
- Instruments: Vocals; guitar
- Labels: Ensign; Chrysalis; Vanguard; Chocolate and Vanilla; One Little Indian; Nettwerk

Sinéad Marie Bernadette O'Connor (/ʃɪ.ˈneɪd/, shin-AYD; 8 December 1966 – 26 July 2023), also known as Shuhada' Sadaqat, (Note: Arabic: شهداء صدقات, romanized: Shuhadāʾ Ṣadaqāt, lit. 'Martyrs Charities'.) was an Irish singer, songwriter, and activist. During her musical career, which encompassed several hit records and artist collaborations, O'Connor drew attention to issues such as child abuse, human rights, racism, and women's rights. She was also known for her outspoken public image, openly discussing her spiritual journey, activism, socio-political viewpoints, and struggles with mental health.

O'Connor's debut studio album, The Lion and the Cobra, was released in 1987 and achieved international chart success. Her 1990 album, I Do Not Want What I Haven't Got, was her biggest commercial success, selling over seven million copies worldwide. Its lead single, "Nothing Compares 2 U", became her signature song and was named the top world single of the year at the Billboard Music Awards. During a performance on Saturday Night Live in 1992, O'Connor sparked criticism for tearing up a photograph of Pope John Paul II.

O'Connor's next albums Am I Not Your Girl? (1992) and Universal Mother (1994) were both certified gold in the UK, while Faith and Courage (2000) was certified gold in Australia and Throw Down Your Arms (2005) was certified gold in Ireland. Having converted to Islam in 2018, she adopted the name Shuhada' Sadaqat while continuing to perform and record under her birth name. Her memoir, Rememberings, was published in 2021 and became a bestseller. In 2024, O'Connor was posthumously nominated for induction into the Rock and Roll Hall of Fame.

== Early life and education ==
Sinéad Marie Bernadette O'Connor was born on 8 December 1966 at the Cascia House Nursing Home on Baggot Street in Dublin. She was named Sinéad after Irish author Sinéad de Valera, the mother of the doctor who presided over her delivery, Éamon de Valera jnr, and Bernadette in honour of Saint Bernadette of Lourdes. She was the third of five children; an older brother is the novelist Joseph O'Connor. Her parents were John Oliver "Seán" O'Connor, a structural engineer who later became a barrister and chairperson of the Divorce Action Group, and Johanna Marie O'Grady (1939–1985), who married in 1960 at the Church of Our Lady of Good Counsel, Drimnagh, Dublin. She attended Dominican College Sion Hill school in Blackrock, Dublin.

In her 2021 memoir, Rememberings, O'Connor wrote that she was regularly beaten by her mother, who also taught her to steal from the collection plate at Mass and from charity tins. In 1979, at age 13, O'Connor went to live with her father, who had recently returned to Ireland after marrying Viola Margaret Suiter (née Cook) in Alexandria, Virginia, United States, in 1976. She shared a room with her sister; on her own side, O'Connor papered the walls with posters of Siouxsie Sioux to mark her difference. She listened to music with noisy electric guitars; she stated, "in real life you aren't allowed to say you're angry but in music you can say anything".

At the age of 15, following her acts of shoplifting and truancy, O'Connor was placed for 18 months in the Grianán Training Centre in Drumcondra, which was run by the Order of Our Lady of Charity. She thrived in certain aspects, particularly in the development of her writing and music, but she chafed under the imposed conformity of the asylum, despite being given freedoms not granted to the other girls, such as attending an outside school and being allowed to listen to music, write songs, etc. For punishment, O'Connor described how "if you were bad, they sent you upstairs to sleep in the old folks' home. You're in there in the pitch black, you can smell the shit and the puke and everything, and these old women are moaning in their sleep ... I have never—and probably will never—experience such panic and terror and agony over anything." She later attended Maryfield College in Drumcondra, and Newtown School in Waterford for fifth and sixth year as a boarder, but did not sit the Leaving Certificate in 1985.

On 10 February 1985, when O'Connor was 18, her mother died in a car accident, aged 45, after losing control of her car on an icy road in Ballybrack and crashing into a bus. In June 1993, O'Connor wrote a public letter in The Irish Times in which she asked people to "stop hurting" her: "If only I can fight off the voices of my parents / and gather a sense of self-esteem / Then I'll be able to REALLY sing..." The letter repeated accusations of child abuse by her parents as a child which O'Connor had made in interviews. Her brother Joseph defended their father to the newspaper, but agreed regarding their mother's "extreme and violent abuse, both emotional and physical". That month, Sinéad said: "Our family is very messed up. We can't communicate with each other. We are all in agony. I, for one, am in agony."

== Music career ==
=== 1980s: Beginnings and The Lion and the Cobra ===
One of the volunteers at the Grianán centre was the sister of Paul Byrne, the drummer for the band In Tua Nua, who heard O'Connor singing "Evergreen" by Barbra Streisand. She recorded a song with them called "Take My Hand" but they felt that at 15, she was too young to join the band. Through an ad she placed in Hot Press in mid-1984, she met Colm Farrelly. Together they recruited a few other members and formed a band, Ton Ton Macoute. The band moved to Waterford briefly while O'Connor attended Newtown School, but she soon dropped out of school and followed them to Dublin, where their performances received positive reviews. Their sound was inspired by Farrelly's interest in world music, though most observers thought O'Connor's singing and stage presence were the band's strongest features.

O'Connor's time with Ton Ton Macoute brought her to the attention of the music industry, and she was eventually signed by Ensign Records. She also acquired an experienced manager, Fachtna Ó Ceallaigh, former head of U2's Mother Records. Soon after she was signed, she embarked on her first major assignment, providing the vocals for the song "Heroine", which she co-wrote with the U2 guitarist the Edge for the soundtrack to the film Captive. Ó Ceallaigh, who had been fired by U2 for complaining about them in an interview, was outspoken with his views on music and politics, and O'Connor adopted the same habits; she defended the actions of the Provisional IRA and said U2's music was "bombastic". She later retracted her IRA comments saying they were based on nonsense, and that she was "too young to understand the tense situation in Northern Ireland properly".

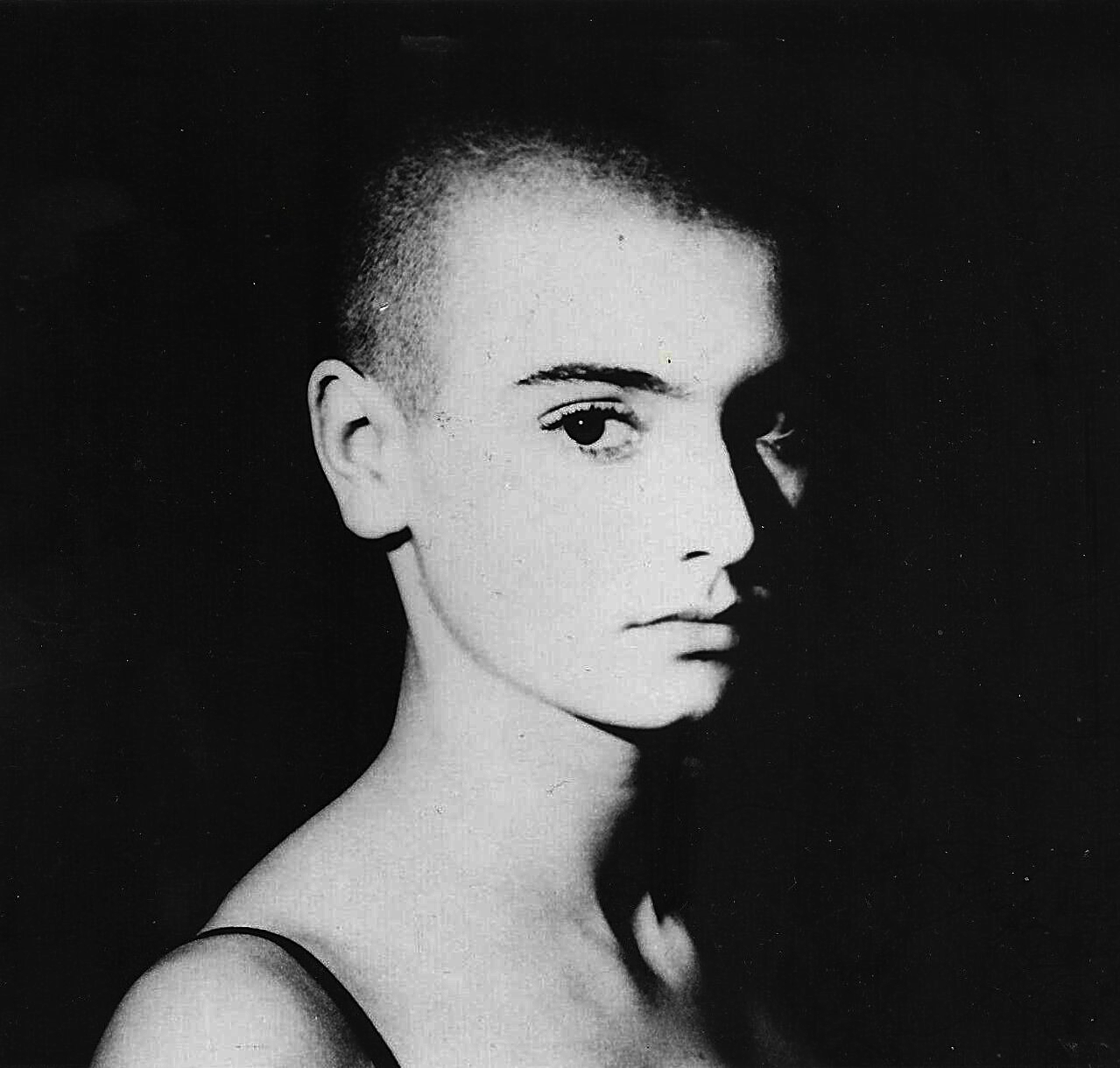
O'Connor in 1987

O'Connor's first album, The Lion and the Cobra, was "a sensation" when it was released in 1987 on Chrysalis Records. O'Connor named Bob Dylan, David Bowie, Bob Marley, Siouxsie and the Banshees, and the Pretenders as the artists who influenced her on her debut album. The Lion and the Cobra was the first of a series of albums that she co-produced. The single "Mandinka" was a college radio hit in the United States, and "I Want Your (Hands on Me)" received both college and urban play in a remixed form that featured rapper MC Lyte. The song "Troy" was also released as a single in the UK, Ireland, and the Netherlands, where it reached number five on the Dutch Top 40 chart. Enya appeared on the track "Never Get Old" reciting psalm 91 in the Irish language.

In her first US network television appearance, O'Connor sang "Mandinka" on Late Night with David Letterman in 1988. She was nominated for a Grammy Award for Best Female Rock Vocal Performance, and performed "Mandinka" at the 31st Annual Grammy Awards. She painted the logo of the hip-hop group Public Enemy on her head to protest the first-ever Best Rap Performance award being conferred off-screen.

In 1989, O'Connor provided guest vocals on the The's album Mind Bomb, on the duet "Kingdom of Rain". That same year, she made another foray into cinema, starring in and writing the music for the Northern Irish film Hush-a-Bye-Baby.

=== 1990s: I Do Not Want What I Haven't Got and Saturday Night Live protest ===
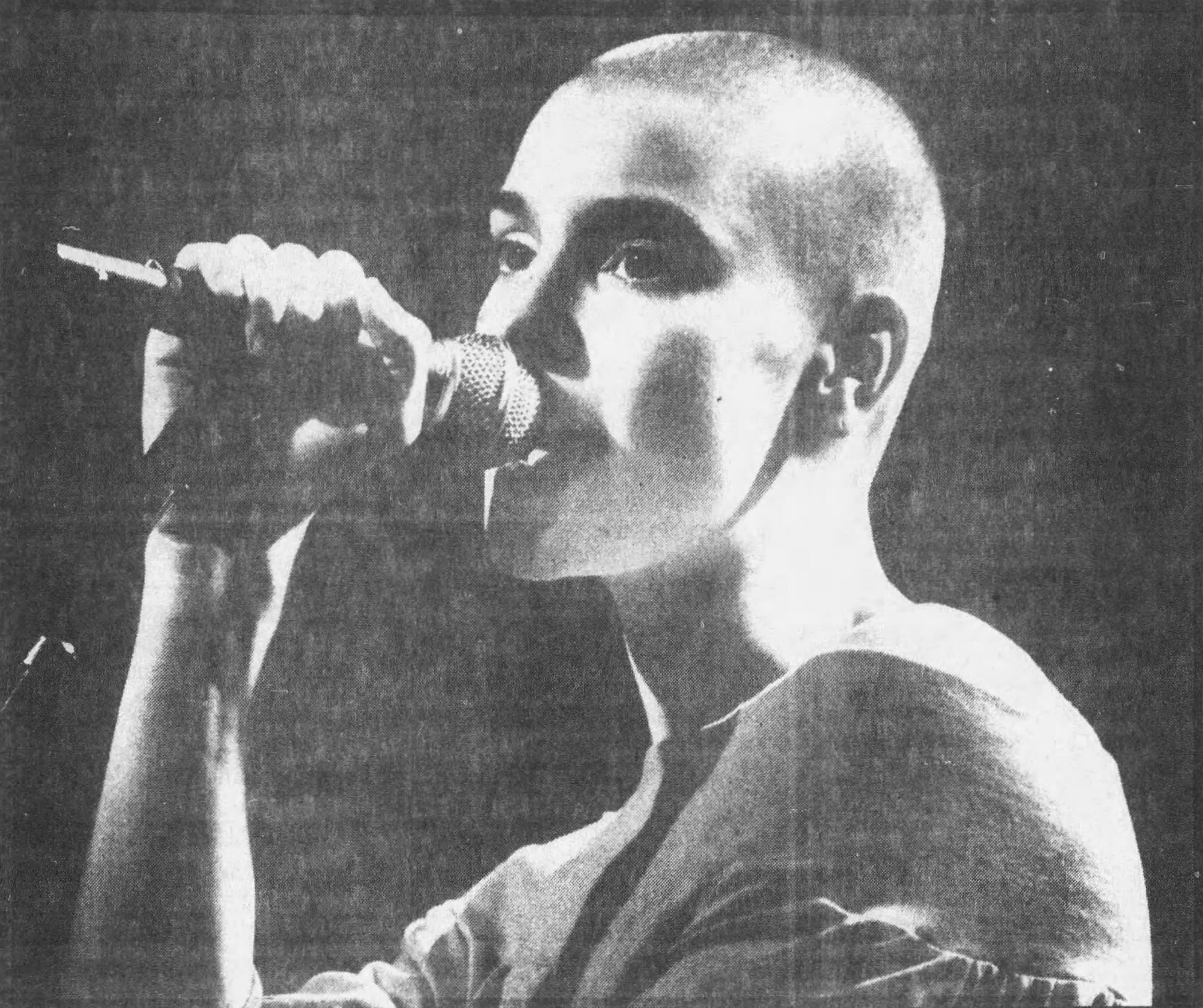
O'Connor performing in 1988

O'Connor's second album, I Do Not Want What I Haven't Got, was released in 1990. It gained considerable attention and mostly positive reviews. NME named it the year's second-best album. She was praised for her voice and original songs, while being noted for her appearance: trademark shaved head, often angry expression, and sometimes shapeless or unusual clothing. Her shaved head has been seen as a statement against traditional views of femininity.

The album featured Marco Pirroni (formerly of Adam and the Ants), Andy Rourke (from the Smiths) and John Reynolds, her first husband. It contained her international breakthrough hit "Nothing Compares 2 U", a song written by Prince and originally recorded and released by a side project of his, the Family. Hank Shocklee, producer for Public Enemy, remixed the album's next single, "The Emperor's New Clothes", for a 12-inch that was coupled with another song from the LP, "I Am Stretched on Your Grave". Pre-dating but included on I Do Not Want What I Haven't Got, was "Jump in the River", which originally appeared on the Married to the Mob soundtrack; the 12-inch version of the single had included a remix featuring performance artist Karen Finley.

O'Connor withdrew from a scheduled appearance on the American programme Saturday Night Live (SNL) when she learnt that it was to be hosted by Andrew Dice Clay, who she said was disrespectful to women. In July 1990, O'Connor joined other guests for the former Pink Floyd member Roger Waters' performance of The Wall in Berlin. She contributed a cover of "You Do Something to Me" to the Cole Porter tribute/AIDS fundraising album Red Hot + Blue produced by the Red Hot Organization. Her take on Elton John's "Sacrifice", recorded for the tribute album Two Rooms: Celebrating the Songs of Elton John & Bernie Taupin, was described by AllMusic as finding "the tortured soul" of the song "in a way that the original recording never did".

I don't do anything in order to cause trouble. It just so happens that what I do naturally causes trouble. I'm proud to be a troublemaker.

— O'Connor in NME, March 1991

O'Connor said she would not perform if the United States national anthem was played before one of her concerts in 1990, saying she felt the American music industry was racist. She was attacked as ungrateful and anti-American, and drew criticism from celebrities including the singer Frank Sinatra, who threatened to "kick her in the ass". When people steamrolled her albums outside the offices of her record company in New York City, O'Connor attended in a wig and sunglasses and gave a television interview pretending to be from Saratoga.

O'Connor was nominated for four awards at the 33rd Annual Grammy Awards and won for Best Alternative Music Performance. She refused to attend the ceremony or accept her award, and wrote an open letter to the Recording Academy criticising the industry for promoting materialistic values over artistic merit. At the Brit Awards 1991, she won the Brit Award for International Female Solo Artist, but did not attend the ceremony. She accepted the Irish IRMA in February 1991.

O'Connor spent the following months studying bel canto singing with teacher Frank Merriman at the Parnell School of Music. In an interview with The Guardian, published in May 1993, she reported that the lessons were the only therapy she was receiving, describing Merriman as "the most amazing teacher in the universe". In 1992, O'Connor contributed vocals on the songs "Come Talk to Me" and "Blood of Eden" from the album Us by Peter Gabriel.

O'Connor tearing up a picture of Pope John Paul II on live television in 1992

In 1992, O'Connor released her third album, Am I Not Your Girl?, comprising covers of jazz standards and torch songs she had listened to while growing up; the album received mixed-to-poor reviews, and was a commercial disappointment in light of the success of her previous work. On 3 October 1992, O'Connor appeared on SNL and staged a protest against the Roman Catholic Church. After performing an a cappella rendition of Bob Marley's 1976 song "War" with new lyrics related to child abuse, she tore up a photograph of Pope John Paul II taken from her mother's bedroom wall eight years earlier, said "fight the real enemy", and threw the pieces to the floor. A month later, O'Connor said she felt the Catholic Church bore some responsibility for the physical, sexual and emotional abuse she had suffered as a child. In describing her actions, she said the church had destroyed "entire races of people", and that Catholic priests had been abusing children for years. Her protest took place nine years before John Paul II publicly acknowledged child sexual abuse in the Catholic Church.

The protest triggered hundreds of complaints from viewers. It attracted criticism from institutions including the Anti-Defamation League and the National Ethnic Coalition of Organizations, and celebrities including Catholic Italian Americans Joe Pesci, Frank Sinatra and Madonna, who mocked the performance on SNL later that season. Two weeks after her SNL appearance, O'Connor was booed at the 30th-anniversary tribute concert for Bob Dylan at Madison Square Garden in New York City before Kris Kristofferson came on stage, put his arm around her and offered words of encouragement. In her 2021 memoir, Rememberings, O'Connor wrote that she did not regret the protest and that it was more important for her to be a protest singer than a successful pop star. Time later named O'Connor the most influential woman of 1992 for her protest.

The 1993 soundtrack to the film In the Name of the Father featured O'Connor's "You Made Me the Thief of Your Heart". Her more conventional Universal Mother album (1994) spawned two music videos for the first and second singles, "Fire on Babylon" and "Famine", that were nominated for a Grammy Award for Best Short Form Music Video. She toured with Lollapalooza in 1995, but dropped out when she became pregnant with her second child. In 1997, she released the Gospel Oak EP.

In 1994, she appeared in A Celebration: The Music of Pete Townshend and The Who, also known as Daltrey Sings Townshend. This was a two-night concert at Carnegie Hall produced by Roger Daltrey of the Who in celebration of his 50th birthday. A CD and a VHS video of the concert were issued in 1994, followed by a DVD in 1998.

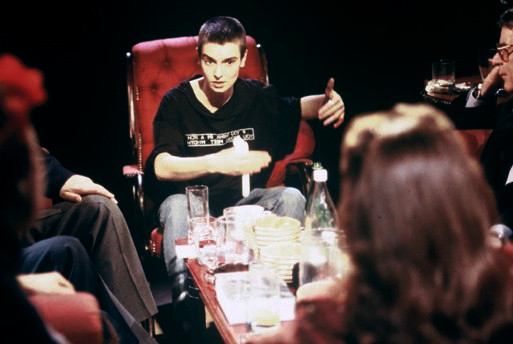
O'Connor on After Dark in 1995

In January 1995, O'Connor appeared on the British late-night television programme After Dark on an episode titled "Ireland: Sex & Celibacy, Church & State". She linked abuse in families to the Catholic Church. The discussion included a Dominican friar and another representative of the Roman Catholic Church, along with former taoiseach Garret FitzGerald. Host Helena Kennedy described the event: "Sinéad came on and argued that abuse in families was coded in by the church because it refused to accept the accounts of women and children."

In 1996, O'Connor provided guest vocals on Broken China, a solo album by Richard Wright of Pink Floyd. She made her final feature film appearance in Neil Jordan's The Butcher Boy in 1997, playing the Virgin Mary. Also in 1997, she performed in the Nobel Peace Prize concert in Oslo, Norway, singing "This is a Rebel Song" and "He Moved Through the Fair". In 1998, she worked again with the Red Hot Organization to co-produce and perform on Red Hot + Rhapsody.

=== 2000s: Features and sporadic activity ===
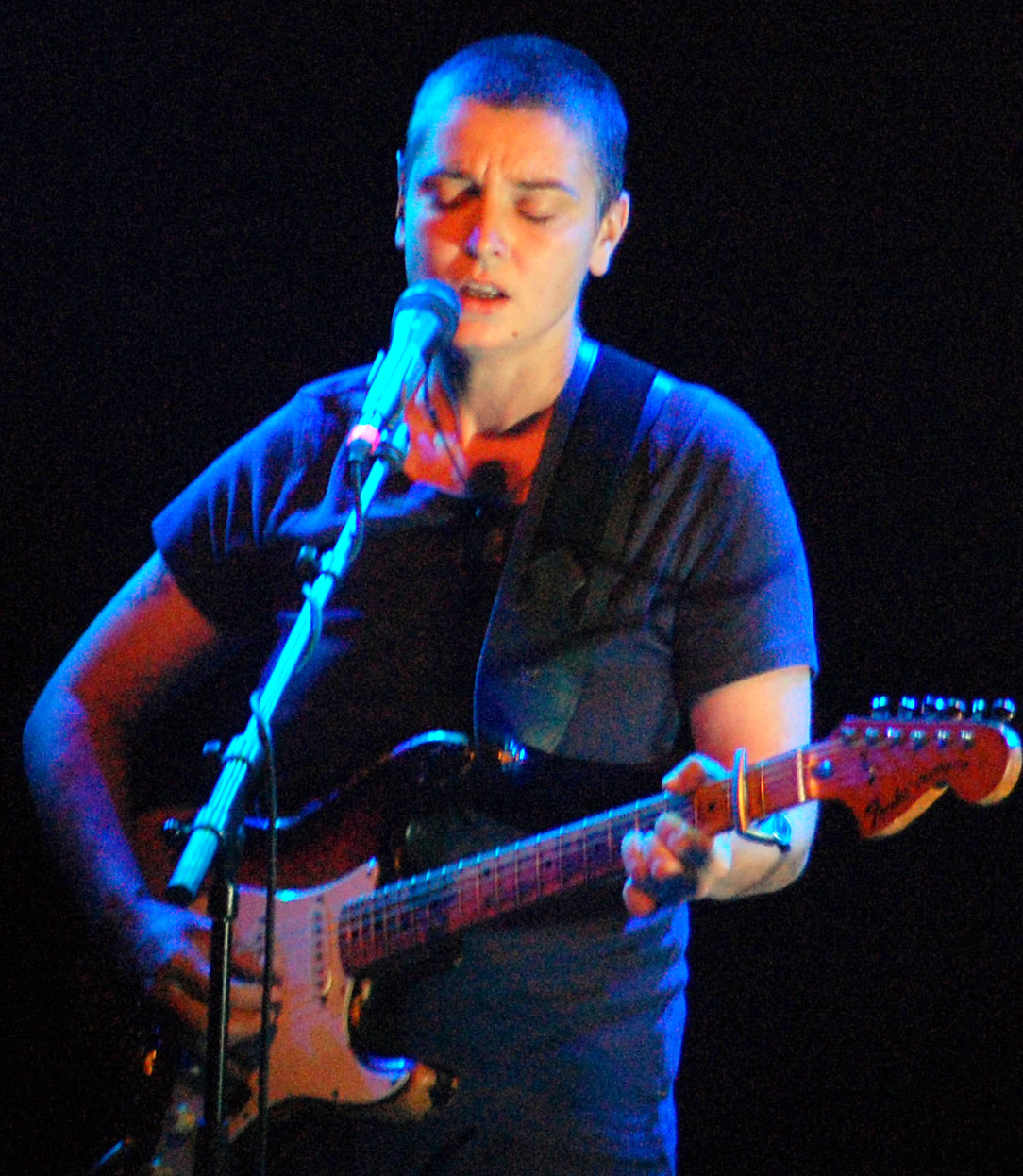
O'Connor at the "Music in My Head" festival in The Hague, 2008

Faith and Courage was released in 2000, including the single "No Man's Woman", and featured contributions from Wyclef Jean of the Fugees and Dave Stewart of Eurythmics.

In 2001, she was featured as the vocalist for the song "Guide Me God" by Ghostland, which had been subsequently remixed into a club hit by producer and DJ Paul Van Dyk.

Her 2002 album, Sean-Nós Nua, marked a departure in that O'Connor interpreted or, in her own words, "sexed up" traditional Irish folk songs, including several in the Irish language. In Sean-Nós Nua, she covered a well-known Canadian folk song, "Peggy Gordon". She was also featured as the vocalist for Conjure One's Tears from the Moon, a defining trance track of its time released in 2002, which was remixed by Tiësto and released in his album Nyana in 2003.

In 2003, she contributed a track to the Dolly Parton tribute album Just Because I'm a Woman, a cover of Parton's "Dagger Through the Heart". That same year, she also featured on three songs of Massive Attack's album 100th Window before releasing her double album, She Who Dwells in the Secret Place of the Most High Shall Abide Under the Shadow of the Almighty. This compilation contained one disc of demos and previously unreleased tracks and one disc of a live concert recording. Directly after the album's release, O'Connor announced that she was retiring from music. Collaborations, a compilation album of guest appearances, was released in 2005—featuring tracks recorded with Peter Gabriel, Massive Attack, Jah Wobble, Terry Hall, Moby, Bomb the Bass, the Edge, U2, and The The.

Ultimately, after a brief period of inactivity and a bout with fibromyalgia, her retirement proved to be short-lived. O'Connor stated in an interview with Harp magazine that she had only intended to retire from making mainstream pop/rock music, and after dealing with her fibromyalgia she chose to move into other musical styles. The reggae album Throw Down Your Arms appeared in late 2005.

On 8 November 2006, O'Connor performed seven songs from her upcoming album Theology at The Sugar Club in Dublin. Thirty fans were given the opportunity to win pairs of tickets to attend along with music industry critics. The performance was released in 2008 as Live at the Sugar Club deluxe CD/DVD package sold exclusively on her website.

O'Connor released two songs from her album Theology to download for free from her official website: "If You Had a Vineyard" and "Jeremiah (Something Beautiful)". The album, a collection of covered and original Rastafari spiritual songs, was released in June 2007. The first single from the album, the Tim Rice and Andrew Lloyd Webber classic "I Don't Know How to Love Him", was released on 30 April 2007. To promote the album, O'Connor toured extensively in Europe and North America. She also appeared on two tracks of the Ian Brown album The World Is Yours, including the anti-war single "Illegal Attacks".

=== 2010s: Return to live performance ===
In January 2010, O'Connor performed a duet with the R&B singer Mary J. Blige, produced by former A Tribe Called Quest member Ali Shaheed Muhammad, of O'Connor's song "This Is To Mother You" (first recorded by O'Connor on her 1997 Gospel Oak EP). The proceeds of the song's sales were donated to the organisation GEMS (Girls Educational and Mentoring Services). In 2012 the song "Lay Your Head Down", written by Brian Byrne and Glenn Close for the soundtrack of the film Albert Nobbs, and performed by O'Connor, was nominated for a Golden Globe Award for Best Original Song.

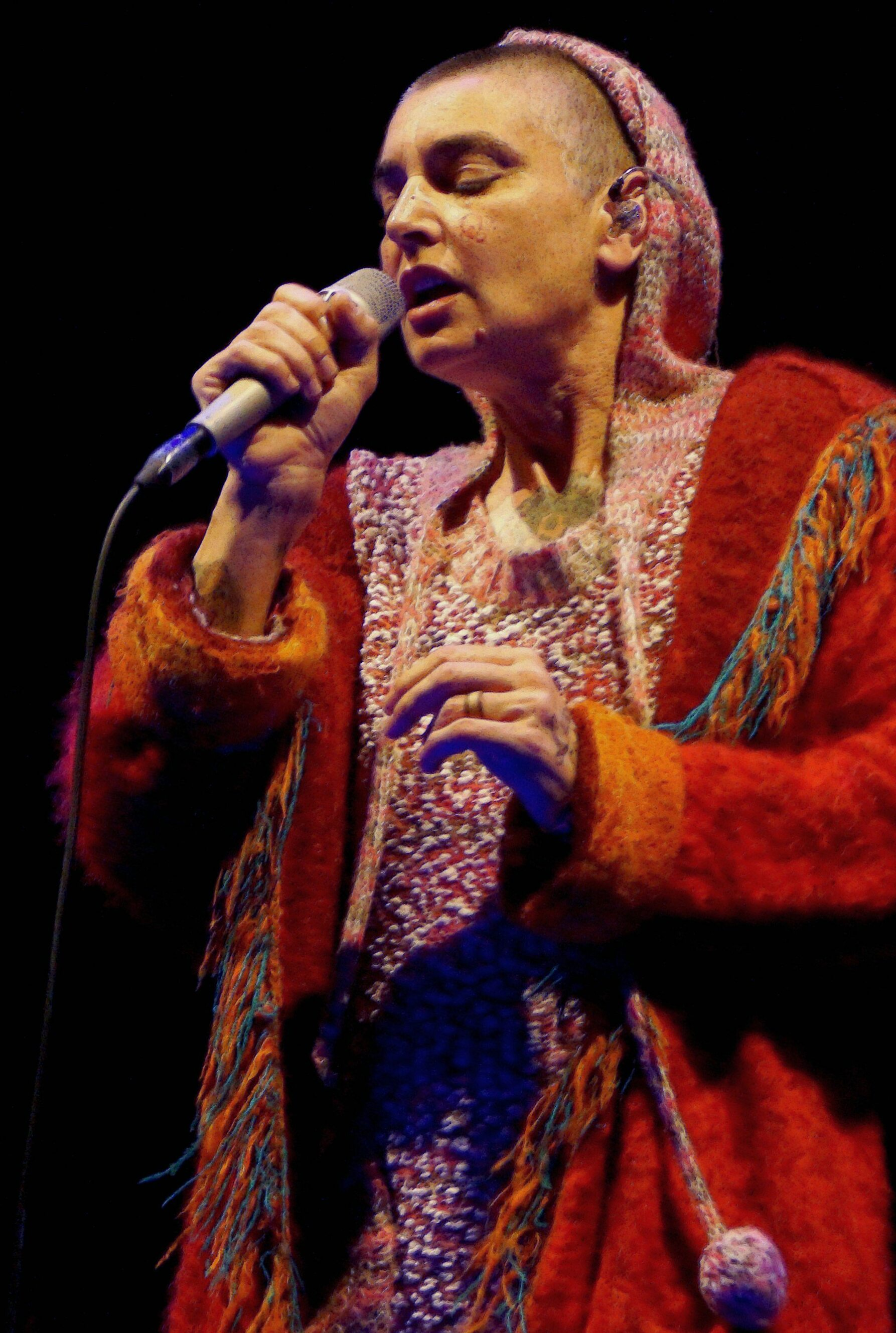
O'Connor performing in 2013

In 2011, O'Connor worked on recording a new album, titled Home, to be released in the beginning of 2012, titled How About I Be Me (and You Be You)?, with the first single being "The Wolf is Getting Married". She planned an extensive tour in support of the album but suffered a serious breakdown between December 2011 and March 2012, resulting in the tour and all her other musical activities for the rest of 2012 being cancelled. O'Connor resumed touring in 2013 with The Crazy Baldhead Tour. The second single "4th and Vine" was released on 18 February 2013.

In February 2014, it was revealed that O'Connor had been recording a new album of original material, titled The Vishnu Room, consisting of romantic love songs. In early June 2014, the new album was retitled I'm Not Bossy, I'm the Boss, with an 11 August release date. The title derives from the Ban Bossy campaign that took place earlier the same year. The album's first single is entitled "Take Me to Church".

In November 2014, O'Connor's management was taken over by Simon Napier-Bell and Björn de Water. On 15 November, O'Connor joined the charity supergroup Band Aid 30 along with other British and Irish pop acts, recording a new version of the track "Do They Know It's Christmas?" at Sarm West Studios in Notting Hill, London, to raise money for the West African Ebola virus epidemic.

In 2017, O'Connor changed her legal name to Magda Davitt, saying she wished to be free of "patriarchal slave names" and "parental curses". In September 2019, she performed live for the first time in five years, singing "Nothing Compares 2 U" with the Irish Chamber Orchestra on RTÉ's The Late Late Show.

=== 2020s: Memoir and death of son ===
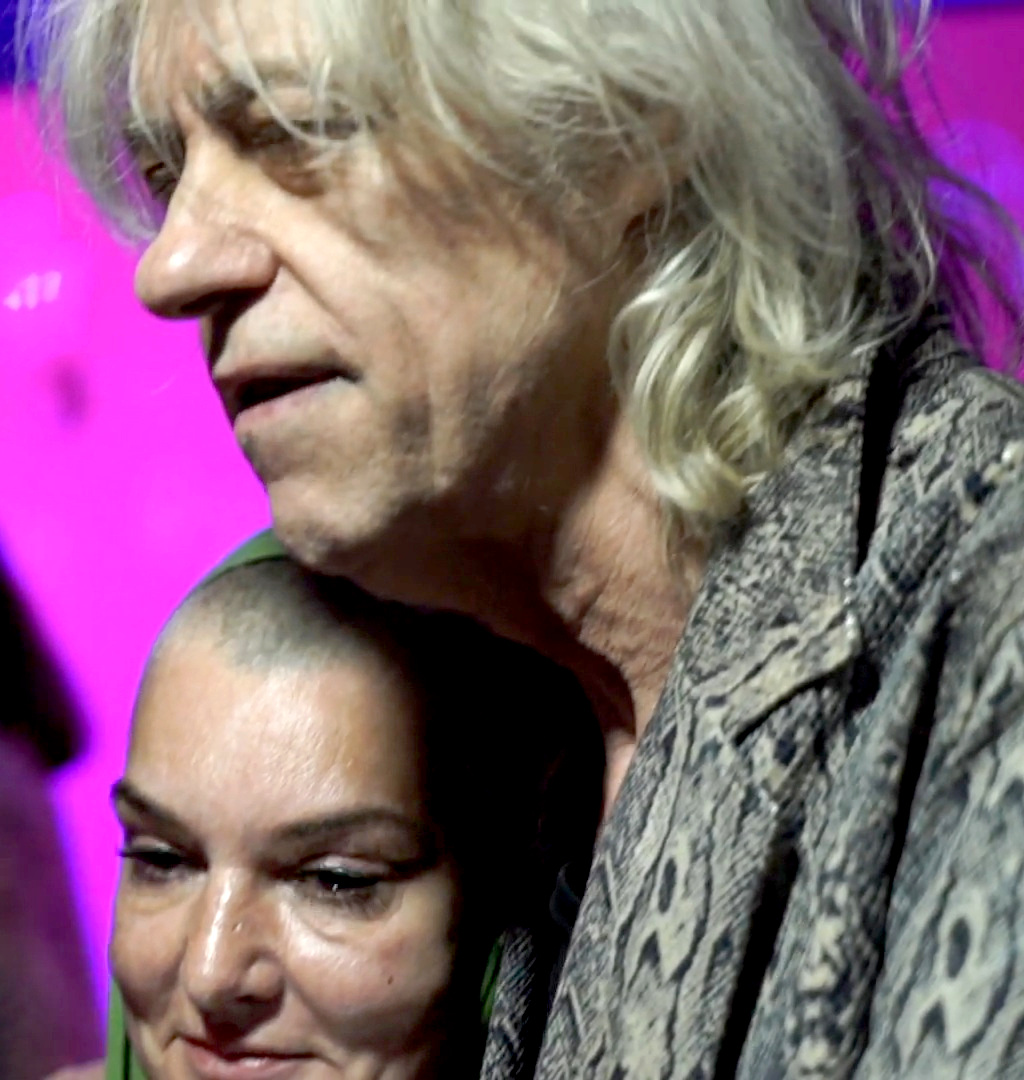
O'Connor and Bob Geldof at 2020 Dublin International Film Festival

O'Connor released a cover of Mahalia Jackson's "Trouble of the World" in October 2020, with proceeds from the single to benefit Black Lives Matter charities. O'Connor released the memoir Rememberings on 1 June 2021 to positive reviews, listed among the best books of the year on BBC Culture. The Irish postal service An Post released a postage stamp on July 15, 2021 bearing an image of O'Connor singing.

O'Connor announced in June 2021 that the album No Veteran Dies Alone would be her last, and that she was retiring from music. She retracted the statement days later, describing it as "a knee-jerk reaction" to an insensitive interview, and announced that her scheduled 2022 tour would go ahead. O'Connor's son Shane died by suicide at the age of 17 on 7 January 2022. O'Connor cancelled her tour and No Veteran Dies Alone was postponed indefinitely. According to the producer David Holmes, by the time of O'Connor's death in 2023, the album was "emotional and really personal" and was complete but for one song.

In February 2023, O'Connor shared a version of "The Skye Boat Song", a 19th-century Scottish adaptation of a 1782 Gaelic song, which is also the theme for the fantasy drama series Outlander. The following month she was awarded the inaugural Choice Music Prize Classic Irish Album by the Irish broadcaster RTÉ for her 1990 album I Do Not Want What I Haven't Got. In September 2023, BBC Television drama series The Woman in the Wall, whose subject was the Irish Magdalene Laundries, played an unreleased O'Connor song, "The Magdalene Song". The song had been given to the series' producers by O'Connor shortly before her death.

=== Death ===
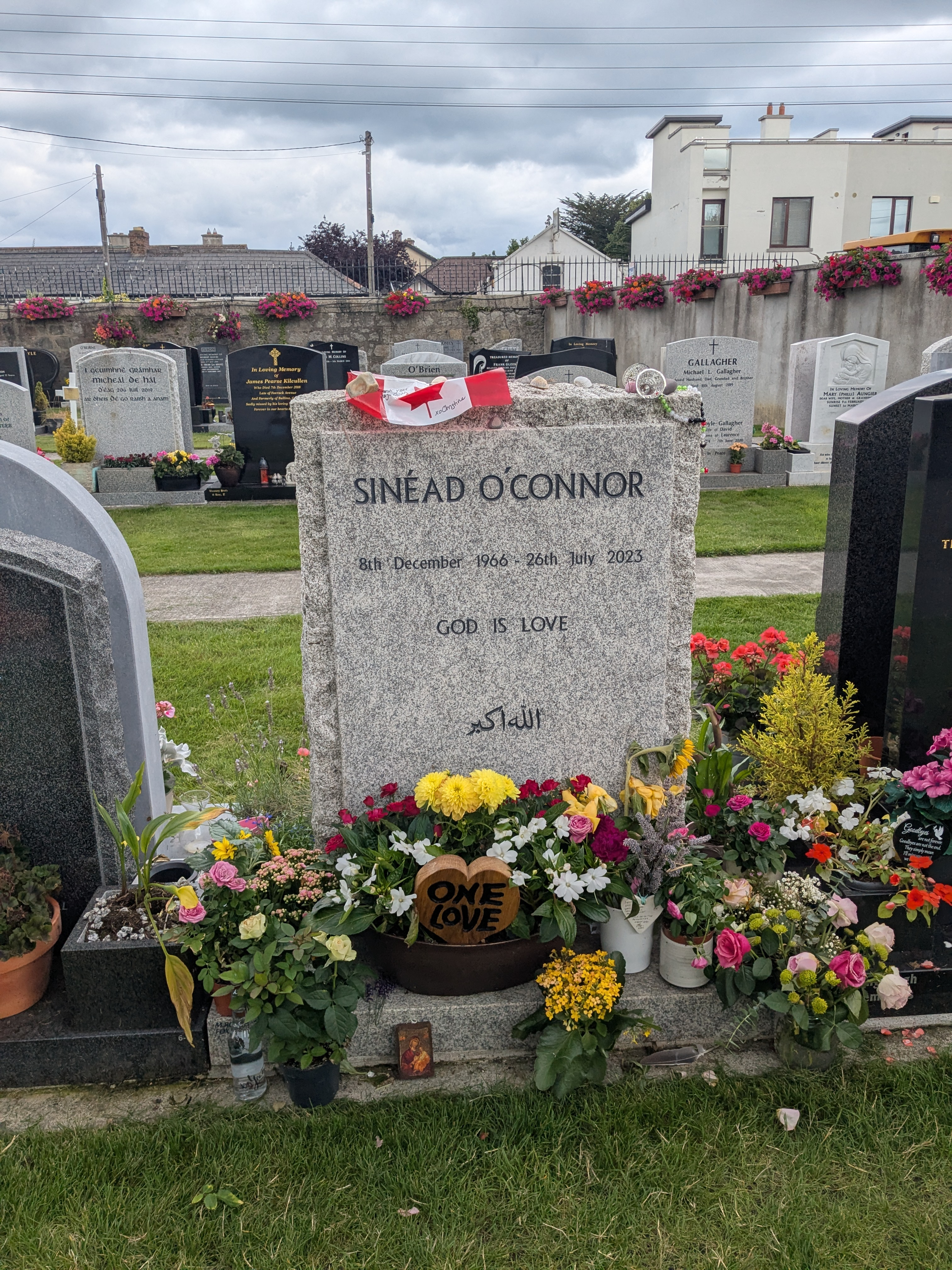
O'Connor's grave in Deansgrange Cemetery, pictured in 2025. The Arabic phrase is the takbir (الله اكبر, Allāhu Akbar), which translates to "God is the greatest" or "God is greater".

O'Connor died on 26 July 2023 in her flat in Herne Hill, South London, at the age of 56. The death certificate stated her cause of death as "exacerbation of chronic obstructive pulmonary disease and bronchial asthma together with low grade lower respiratory tract infection", and the coroner said that she died of natural causes.

A private funeral was held on 8 August in Bray, County Wicklow. It was attended by the president of Ireland, Michael D. Higgins, and O'Connor's family invited the public to pay their respects at the seafront where the funeral cortège passed. Thousands attended bearing signs and tributes; her burial was held privately at Dean's Grange Cemetery.

O'Connor left a sum of £1.7 million (€2 million) to her children Jake Reynolds, Brigidine Roisin Waters, and Yeshua Bonadio. After settling debts, funeral expenses, and legal fees, records from Irish probate reduced the estate's value to £1.4 million (€1.6 million).

== Personal life ==
=== Marriages and children ===
O'Connor's first son was born on 16 June 1987. His father was the music producer John Reynolds, who co-produced several of O'Connor's albums, including Universal Mother. O'Connor married Reynolds at Westminster Register Office in March 1989. She had an abortion the same year, and later wrote the song "My Special Child" about the experience. The couple announced their plan to divorce in November 1991 after having been separated for some time.

In September 1995, O'Connor announced that she was pregnant by her friend, the Irish columnist John Waters. Their daughter was born on 6 March 1996. Soon after the birth, the pair began a long custody battle that ended in 1999 with O'Connor agreeing to let the child live with Waters in Dublin.

In August 2001, O'Connor married the British journalist Nick Sommerlad in Wales. Their marriage ended after 11 months, in July 2002, when they mutually agreed to part. By February 2003, the marriage was reportedly over and Sommerlad had moved back home to the United Kingdom. O'Connor gave birth to her third child, son Shane, on 10 March 2004; his father was the Irish musician Dónal Lunny. Her fourth child, another son, was born on 19 December 2006, fathered by Frank Bonadio. The pair remained on good terms after separating in early 2007.

O'Connor was married a third time on 22 July 2010, to her long-time friend and collaborator Steve Cooney. They separated in March 2011. She was married a fourth time on 9 December 2011, to the Irish therapist Barry Herridge; they married in Las Vegas and the marriage ended after they had "lived together for 7 days only". On 3 January 2012, O'Connor said that she and Herridge had reunited. In February 2014, she stated that they had not divorced and were planning to renew their wedding vows, but two weeks later they decided not to do so. O'Connor's first grandson was born on 18 July 2015.

O'Connor's 17-year-old son Shane was found dead from suicide in January 2022. O'Connor, who had lost custody of Shane in 2013, said he had recently been on suicide watch at Tallaght Hospital. She criticised the Health Service Executive (HSE) for their handling of her son's case. A week after her son's death, O'Connor admitted herself to a hospital to receive help for her own mental-health struggles.

=== Other relationships ===
O'Connor stated that she had a relationship with her manager Fachtna Ó Ceallaigh immediately after her marriage to John Reynolds and during the tour of The Lion and the Cobra. The relationship ended in 1989 when O'Connor discovered that Ceallaigh was secretly having an affair with another woman. This experience is reflected in O'Connor's song "The Last Day of Our Acquaintance".

Anthony Kiedis of the Red Hot Chili Peppers said he had a relationship with O'Connor in 1990 and wrote the song "I Could Have Lied" about the experience. O'Connor denied this, saying "I never had a relationship with him, ever. I hung out with him a few times and the row we had was because he suggested we might become involved. I don't give a shit about the song he wrote."

Between 1992 and 1993, O'Connor had a relationship with the English singer Peter Gabriel, whom she accompanied on his Secret World Tour in May 1993 and at the 1993 MTV Video Music Awards in September. In October 1993, O'Connor said she had attempted suicide by overdosing on sleeping pills as a reaction to Gabriel's refusal to make their relationship permanent. This experience inspired her to write "Thank You for Hearing Me".

In 2014, O'Connor said she "didn't get on at all" with Prince, the writer of "Nothing Compares 2 U". According to O'Connor, Prince demanded she visit him at his home and then chastised her for swearing in interviews, so she told him to "fuck off", at which point Prince became violent and she fled. In her memoir, O'Connor gave some details of Prince's behaviour, which ranged from having his butler serve up soup despite her repeatedly refusing it, to suggesting a pillow fight and then hitting her with a hard object placed in a pillowcase, and stalking her with his car after she had left the mansion.

=== Homes ===
In 2007, O'Connor bought a large Victorian seafront house in Bray, County Wicklow, near Dublin. She sold the property in 2021, after moving temporarily to her holiday home. She later lived at a house in the Kilglass/Scramogue area, between Strokestown and Roosky, County Roscommon, and on the main street of Knockananna, County Wicklow, which she sold in 2022. She later also had a home in Dalkey, a south-east suburb of Dublin. In early 2023, she moved to a flat in London to feel "less lonely", and said she would soon finish her new album.

=== Sexuality ===
In a 2000 interview in Curve, O'Connor said that she was a lesbian. She later retracted the statement, and in 2005 told Entertainment Weekly: "I'm three-quarters heterosexual, a quarter gay".

In 2013, O'Connor published an open letter on her own website to American singer and actress Miley Cyrus in which she warned Cyrus of the treatment of women in the music industry and stated that sexuality is a factor in this, which was in response to Cyrus's music video for her song "Wrecking Ball". Cyrus responded by mocking O'Connor and alluding to her mental health problems. After O'Connor's death, Cyrus publicly apologised for her behaviour.

=== Politics ===
O'Connor was a vocal supporter of a united Ireland, and called on the left-wing republican Sinn Féin party to be "braver". O'Connor called for the "demolition" of the Republic of Ireland and its replacement with a new, united country. She also called for key Sinn Féin politicians like Gerry Adams to step down because "they remind people of violence", referring to the Troubles.

In 2014, she refused to play in Israel as an act of protest against unjust treatment of Palestinians, stating that "Let's just say that, on a human level, nobody with any sanity, including myself, would have anything but sympathy for the Palestinian plight".

In a 2015 interview with the BBC, O'Connor said she wished that Ireland had remained under British rule (which ended after the Irish War of Independence, except for Northern Ireland), saying "the church took over and it was disastrous". Following the Brexit referendum in 2016, O'Connor wrote on Facebook "Ireland is officially no longer owned by Britain".

=== Religion ===
In contradiction with Catholic Church doctrine on the ordination of women, O'Connor was ordained in 1999 by Michael Cox, bishop of an Independent Catholic church. The bishop offered her ordination following her appearance on RTÉ's The Late Late Show, during which she told presenter Gay Byrne that had she not been a singer she would have wished to have been a Catholic priest. O'Connor adopted the religious name Mother Bernadette Mary.

In a July 2007 interview with Christianity Today, O'Connor stated that she considered herself a Christian and that she believed in core Christian concepts about the Trinity and Jesus Christ. She said, "I think God saves everybody whether they want to be saved or not. So when we die, we're all going home [...] I don't think God judges anybody. He loves everybody equally." In an October 2002 interview, she credited her Christian faith in giving her the strength to live through and overcome the effects of her childhood abuse.

On 26 March 2010, O'Connor appeared on CNN's Anderson Cooper 360° to speak out about the Catholic sexual abuse scandal in Ireland. On 28 March 2010, she had an opinion piece published in the Sunday edition of The Washington Post in which she wrote about the scandal and her time in a Magdalene laundry as a teenager. Writing for the Sunday Independent she labelled the Vatican as "a nest of devils" and called for the establishment of an "alternative church", opining that "Christ is being murdered by liars" in the Vatican. Shortly after the election of Pope Francis, she said:

Well, you know, I guess I wish everyone the best, and I don't know anything about the man, so I'm not going to rush to judge him on one thing or another, but I would say he has a scientifically impossible task, because all religions, but certainly the Catholic Church, is really a house built on sand, and it's drowning in a sea of conditional love, and therefore it can't survive, and actually the office of Pope itself is an anti-Christian office, the idea that Christ needs a representative is laughable and blasphemous at the same time, therefore it is a house built on sand, and we need to rescue God from religion, all religions, they've become a smokescreen that distracts people from the fact that there is a holy spirit, and when you study the Gospels you see the Christ character came to tell us that we only need to talk directly to God, we never needed Religion ...

Asked whether from her point of view, it is therefore irrelevant who is elected to be pope, O'Connor replied:

Genuinely I don't mean disrespect to Catholic people because I believe in Jesus Christ, I believe in the Holy Spirit, all of those, but I also believe in all of them, I don't think it cares if you call it Fred or Daisy, you know? Religion is a smokescreen, it has everybody talking to the wall. There is a Holy Spirit who can't intervene on our behalf unless we ask it. Religion has us talking to the wall. The Christ character tells us himself: you must only talk directly to the Father; you don't need intermediaries. We all thought we did, and that's ok, we're not bad people, but let's wake up [...] God was there before religion; it's there [today] despite religion; it'll be there when religion is gone.

Tatiana Kavelka wrote about O'Connor's later Christian work, describing it as "theologically charged yet unorthodox, oriented toward interfaith dialogue and those on the margins". In August 2018, via an open letter, she asked Pope Francis to issue a certificate of excommunication to her, as she had also asked Pope Benedict XVI and Pope John Paul II.

In October 2018, O'Connor converted to Islam, calling it "the natural conclusion of any intelligent theologian's journey". The ceremony was conducted in Ireland by Sunni Islamic theologian Shaykh Umar Al-Qadri. She also changed her name to Shuhada' Davitt. In a message on Twitter, she thanked fellow Muslims for their support and uploaded a video of herself reciting the adhan, the Islamic call to prayer. She also posted photos of herself wearing a hijab. She later changed her surname from Davitt to Sadaqat.

After her conversion to Islam, Sadaqat called those who were not Muslims "disgusting" and criticised Christian and Jewish theologians on Twitter in November 2018. She wrote: "What I'm about to say is something so racist I never thought my soul could ever feel it. But truly I never wanna spend time with white people again (if that's what non-muslims are called). Not for one moment, for any reason. They are disgusting." Two days later, she tweeted that anyone who is not Muslim is "mentally ill". Later that month, Sadaqat stated that her remarks were made in an attempt to force Twitter to close down her account. In September 2019, she apologised for the remarks, saying "They were not true at the time and they are not true now. I was triggered as a result of Islamophobia dumped on me. I apologize for hurt caused. That was one of many crazy tweets lord knows."

=== Health ===
In the early 2000s, O'Connor revealed that she suffered from fibromyalgia. The pain and fatigue she experienced caused her to take a break from music from 2003 to 2005.

On an episode of The Oprah Winfrey Show broadcast on 4 October 2007, O'Connor disclosed that she had attempted suicide on her 33rd birthday, 8 December 1999, and that she had since been diagnosed with bipolar disorder.

In August 2015, she announced that she was to undergo a hysterectomy after suffering gynaecological problems for over three years. She later blamed the hospital's refusal to administer hormone replacement therapy after the operation as the main reason for her mental health issues in subsequent years, stating "I was flung into surgical menopause. Hormones were everywhere. I became very suicidal. I was a basket case."

A cannabis smoker for 30 years, O'Connor went to a rehabilitation centre in 2016, to end her addiction. She stated in February 2020 that she was agoraphobic. She had also previously been diagnosed with complex post-traumatic stress disorder and borderline personality disorder.

In August 2017, O'Connor posted a 12-minute video on her Facebook page in which she stated that she had felt alone since losing custody of her 13-year-old son, Shane, and that for the previous two years she had wanted to kill herself, with only her doctor and psychiatrist "keeping her alive". The month after her Facebook post, O'Connor appeared on the 16th-season debut episode of American television talk show Dr. Phil. According to the show's host, Phil McGraw, O'Connor wanted to do the interview because she wished to "destigmatise mental illness", noting the prevalence of mental health problems among musicians. In 2021, O'Connor commented that she had spent much of the last six years in St Patrick's University Hospital in Dublin, and that she was grateful to them for helping her stay alive.

== Legacy ==
In November 2026, 3 years after her death, Sinead's family announced that they had taken control of her Social Media and that new projects, including her final recordings, are to be released.

=== Tributes ===
Following O'Connor's death, celebrities including BP Fallon, Imelda May, MC Lyte, Janelle Monáe, Enya, Patton Oswalt, Jamie Lee Curtis, Tori Amos, Bear McCreary, Massive Attack, Public Enemy, Amanda Palmer, and Toni Collette posted tributes on social media. Morrissey wrote a tribute criticising the reaction from executives and celebrities: "You praise her now only because it is too late. You hadn't the guts to support her when she was alive and she was looking for you."

Phoebe Bridgers wrote a tribute to O'Connor in Rolling Stone, praising her integrity. In November 2023, the American indie rock supergroup Boygenius and the Irish folk music duo Ye Vagabonds released a cover of the Scottish traditional song "The Parting Glass" as a charity Christmas song and tribute to O'Connor.

On 9 January 2024, it was announced that a tribute concert for O'Connor and Shane MacGowan from the Pogues, who also died in 2023, would take place on 20 March in Carnegie Hall in New York City.

On 4 February 2024, Annie Lennox paid tribute to O'Connor by performing "Nothing Compares 2 U" during the In Memoriam segment at the 66th Annual Grammy Awards. During the performance she had a tear painted on her cheek in homage to a similar scene in the song's music video. She was accompanied by Wendy & Lisa. Lennox ended the performance by calling for a ceasefire in the Gaza war and "peace in the world" which was also seen as a tribute to O'Connor's political outspokenness. In March 2024, a Bratz doll in O'Connor's likeness, to commemorate Women's History Month, was announced.

=== In popular culture ===
On 15 July 2021, the Irish postal service, An Post, released a postage stamp celebrating O'Connor.

She was parodied as Niamh Connolly, a feminist singer played by Scottish singer Clare Grogan, in "Rock a Hula Ted", an episode of the television series Father Ted.

Producers of the Outlander television series dedicated Series 7, Episode 8 to her, adding a card before the end credits reading, "In loving memory of Sinead O'Connor."

== Discography ==
- The Lion and the Cobra (1987)
- I Do Not Want What I Haven't Got (1990)
- Am I Not Your Girl? (1992)
- Universal Mother (1994)
- Faith and Courage (2000)
- Sean-Nós Nua (2002)
- Throw Down Your Arms (2005)
- Theology (2007)
- How About I Be Me (and You Be You)? (2012)
- I'm Not Bossy, I'm the Boss (2014)
- No Veteran Dies Alone (tbc)

== Filmography ==
Film and television appearances of Sinéad O'Connor
Year	Film	Role	Notes
1990	Hush-a-Bye Baby	Sinéad	also wrote the soundtrack.
1991	The Ghosts of Oxford Street	Ann of Oxford Street	TV movie
1992	Emily Brontë's Wuthering Heights	Emily Brontë	uncredited
1997	The Butcher Boy	Virgin Mary	
2007	100 Greatest Songs of the 90s	Herself	miniseries
2022	Nothing Compares	Herself (voice)	documentary

== Accolades ==
List of awards and nominations of Sinéad O'Connor
Year	Work	Association	Category	Result	Ref.
1989	The Lion and the Cobra	Grammy Awards	Best Female Rock Vocal Performance	Nominated	
1990	Herself	Rockbjörnen	Best Foreign Artist	Won	
1990	Herself	Billboard Music Awards	Rock Female Artist	Won	
1990	"Nothing Compares 2 U"	Billboard Music Awards	No. 1 World Single	Won	
1990	"Nothing Compares 2 U"	MTV Video Music Awards	Video of the Year	Won	
1990	"Nothing Compares 2 U"	MTV Video Music Awards	Best Female Video	Won	
1990	"Nothing Compares 2 U"	MTV Video Music Awards	Best Post-Modern Video	Won	
1990	"Nothing Compares 2 U"	MTV Video Music Awards	Breakthrough Video	Nominated	
1990	"Nothing Compares 2 U"	MTV Video Music Awards	Viewer's Choice	Nominated	
1990	"Nothing Compares 2 U"	MTV Video Music Awards	International Viewer's Choice (MTV Europe)	Nominated	
1991	"Nothing Compares 2 U"	Grammy Awards	Record of the Year	Nominated	
1991	"Nothing Compares 2 U"	Grammy Awards	Best Female Pop Vocal Performance	Nominated	
1991	"Nothing Compares 2 U"	Grammy Awards	Best Music Video, Short Form	Nominated	
1991	I Do Not Want What I Haven't Got	Grammy Awards	Best Alternative Music Performance	Won	
1991	I Do Not Want What I Haven't Got	Juno Awards	International Album of the Year	Nominated	
1991	Herself	Juno Awards	International Entertainer of the Year	Nominated	
1991	Herself	American Music Awards	Favorite Pop/Rock Female Artist	Nominated	
1991	Herself	Brit Awards	International Female Solo Artist	Won	
1991	Herself	Danish Music Awards	Foreign Female Artist of the Year	Won	
1991	"Nothing Compares 2 U"	Danish Music Awards	Foreign Hit of the Year	Won	
1992	Year of the Horse	Grammy Awards	Best Music Video, Long Form	Nominated	
1994	"You Made Me the Thief of Your Heart"	MTV Video Music Awards	Best Video from a Film	Nominated	
1994	Herself	Goldene Europa Awards	Best International Singer	Won	
1994	Herself	Žebřík Music Award	Best International Female	Nominated	
1995	Herself	Brit Awards	International Female Solo Artist	Nominated	
1995	"Fire on Babylon"	Grammy Awards	Best Music Video, Short Form	Nominated	
1996	"Famine"	Grammy Awards	Best Music Video, Short Form	Nominated	
1996	"Famine"	D&AD Awards	Pop Promo Video (Individual)	Wood Pencil	
2000	"No Man's Woman"	Billboard Music Awards	Best Jazz/AC Clip of the Year	Nominated	
2000	Herself	Žebřík Music Award	Best International Female	Nominated	
2003	"Troy"	International Dance Music Awards	Best Progressive House/Trance Track	Nominated	
2004	Herself	Meteor Music Awards	Best Irish Female	Nominated	
2005	Herself	Meteor Music Awards	Best Irish Female	Nominated	
2006	Herself	Meteor Music Awards	Best Irish Female	Nominated	
2007	Herself	Meteor Music Awards	Best Irish Female	Nominated	
2008	Herself	Meteor Music Awards	Best Irish Female	Nominated	
2012	"Lay Your Head Down"	World Soundtrack Awards	Best Original Song Written Directly for a Film	Won	
2012	"Queen of Denmark"	Rober Awards Music Poll	Best Cover Version	Nominated	
2013	"GMF" (with John Grant)	Rober Awards Music Poll	Song of the Year	Nominated	
2015	I'm Not Bossy, I'm the Boss	Meteor Choice Music Prize	Best Album	Nominated	
2015	"Take Me To Church"	Meteor Choice Music Prize	Song of the Year	Nominated	
2023	I Do Not Want What I Haven't Got	Meteor Choice Music Prize	Irish Classic Album	Won	
2024	Herself	Rock and Roll Hall of Fame	Performer	Nominated	

- "You Made Me the Thief of Your Heart", from the film In the Name of the Father (1993), was nominated for the Golden Globe Award for Best Original Song in 1994. This nomination is credited to songwriters Bono, Gavin Friday, and Maurice Seezer.
- "Lay Your Head Down", from the film Albert Nobbs (2011), was nominated for the Golden Globe Award for Best Original Song in 2012. This nomination is credited to composer Brian Byrne and songwriter Glenn Close.
- In 2019, Time created 89 new covers to celebrate women of the year starting from 1920; it chose O'Connor for 1992.

== See also ==
- List of Irish people
- List of Irish musicians
- List of Irish Grammy Award winners and nominees
- List of people from Dublin
- List of solved missing person cases (2020s)
