= I'm Not Bossy, I'm the Boss =

Studio album by Sinéad O'Connor
- Released: 11 August 2014
- Recorded: 2013–2014
- Studio: New Air Studios (Kilburn, London)
- Genre: Alternative rock
- Length: 40:59
- Label: Nettwerk
- Producer: John Reynolds

Sinéad O'Connor chronology
How About I Be Me (and You Be You)? (2012)	I'm Not Bossy, I'm the Boss (2014)

Singles from I'm Not Bossy, I'm the Boss
- 1. "Take Me to Church" Released: 11 August 2014; 2. "8 Good Reasons" Released: 17 November 2014; 3. "How About I Be Me" Released: 30 October 2015

I'm Not Bossy, I'm the Boss is the tenth and final studio album by Irish singer-songwriter Sinéad O'Connor, released on 11 August 2014 on Nettwerk Music Group. The album was originally to be called The Vishnu Room after the song of the same name, but was changed, along with its original cover design, shortly before release in support of the Ban Bossy campaign.

The album was nominated for the Irish Meteor Choice Music Prize for Best Album. It was O'Connor's final completed album before her death in 2023.

== Critical reception ==
Professional ratings
Aggregate scores
Source	Rating
Metacritic	66/100
Review scores
Source	Rating
AllMusic	3.5/5 stars
American Songwriter	4/5 stars
The Boston Globe	4/5 stars
The Guardian	3/5 stars
Los Angeles Times	3/4 stars
Mojo	4/5 stars
Now	3/5 stars
Pitchfork	7.3/10
Record Collector	4/5 stars
Slant Magazine	3/5 stars

Upon release the album received positive reviews from such publications as American Songwriter, The Guardian, Now and Slant Magazine. The Metacritic aggregate score on August 12, 2014, was 66 out of a 100. Fred Thomas, writing for AllMusic, gave the album 3.5 stars out of 5, with a favorable review, opening with the summary: "A decade of inconsistent, spotty, or simply confusing output from iconic Irish singer/songwriter Sinéad O'Connor was redeemed with 2012's refreshingly focused and honest effort How About I Be Me (And You Be You)? That album saw O'Connor effortlessly creating the same type of emotionally charged yet easily melodic fare that constituted her earliest, most popular work, and positioned her for a graceful return to form. Two years later, I'm Not Bossy, I'm the Boss follows the impassioned pop framework of its immediate predecessor, branching out into even more vivid stylistic dimensions and retaining all the energy, controversy, and fire that have come to define O'Connor as both a musician and a political figure. Taken at face value, the songs here are vibrant and multifaceted."

== Track listing ==
I'm Not Bossy, I'm the Boss track listing
No.	Title	Writer(s)	Length
1.	"How About I Be Me"	O'Connor, Kemar McGregor	3:25
2.	"Dense Water Deeper Down"	O'Connor	3:32
3.	"Kisses Like Mine"	O'Connor	2:28
4.	"Your Green Jacket"	O'Connor, John Reynolds, Graham Kearns	3:23
5.	"The Vishnu Room"	O'Connor, Reynolds, Kearns	2:47
6.	"The Voice of My Doctor"	O'Connor, Don Baker	3:36
7.	"Harbour"	O'Connor, Reynolds, Kearns	4:40
8.	"James Brown" (with Seun Kuti)	O'Connor, Reynolds, Justin Adams	3:04
9.	"8 Good Reasons"	O'Connor, Reynolds, Kearns	3:26
10.	"Take Me to Church"	O'Connor, Reynolds, Kearns	3:01
11.	"Where Have You Been?"	O'Connor, Reynolds	3:02
12.	"Streetcars"	O'Connor, Graham Henderson	4:28

Deluxe edition
No.	Title	Writer(s)	Length
13.	"How Nice a Woman Can Be"	O'Connor	3:02
14.	"Make a Fool of Me All Night"	O'Connor	3:35
15.	"Little Story"	O'Connor, Reynolds, Adams	3:06

== Personnel ==
- Sinéad O'Connor – vocals; guitar on tracks 2, 3 and 5; bass guitar on track 13
- Rubert Cobb, Fred Gibson – trumpet
- John Reynolds – drums, keyboards, programming, mixing, production
- Clare Kenny – bass guitar
- Graham Kearns, Justin Adams – guitar
- Graham Henderson, Tim Oliver – keyboards
- Brook Supple – acoustic guitar
- Brian Eno – keyboards
- Tim Oliver – keyboards, mixing
- Caroline Dale – cello
- Seun Kuti – saxophone
- Ruby Reynolds – piano
- John Rummen – design
- Graham Bolger – additional engineering
- Kevin Metcalfe – mastering
- Donal Moloney – photography

== Charts ==
Chart performance for I'm Not Bossy, I'm the Boss
Chart (2014–2015)	Peak position
Australian Albums (ARIA)	191
Austrian Albums (Ö3 Austria)	44
Belgian Albums (Ultratop Flanders)	20
Belgian Albums (Ultratop Wallonia)	64
Danish Albums (Hitlisten)	28
Dutch Albums (Album Top 100)	18
French Albums (SNEP)	132
German Albums (Offizielle Top 100)	39
Irish Albums (IRMA)	1
Italian Albums (FIMI)	39
New Zealand Albums (RMNZ)	21
Polish Albums (ZPAV)	40
Scottish Albums (OCC)	24
Spanish Albums (Promusicae)	88
Swiss Albums (Schweizer Hitparade)	48
UK Albums (OCC)	22
UK Independent Albums (OCC)	3
US Billboard 200	83
US Top Alternative Albums (Billboard)	18
US Top Rock Albums (Billboard)	23

== See also ==
- List of 2014 albums
- List of number-one albums of 2014 (Ireland)
