= Theology (album) =

Studio album by Sinéad O'Connor
- Released: 18 June 2007
- Recorded: 2006–2007
- Studios: Dublin, Ireland; Mayfair Recording Studios (London, England); Olympic Studios (London, England); Presidential Suite, Jury's Hotel (Dublin, Ireland); RonTom Residential Studios (London, England); WindMill Lane Studios (Dublin, Ireland)
- Genre: Rock
- Length: 89:53
- Labels: Rubyworks; Koch
- Producers: Steve Cooney; Graham Bolger; Ron Tom; Sinéad O'Connor

Sinéad O'Connor chronology
Throw Down Your Arms (2005)	Theology (2007)	How About I Be Me (and You Be You)? (2012)

Professional ratings
Aggregate scores
Source	Rating
Metacritic	50/100
Review scores
Source	Rating
AllMusic	3.5/5 stars
The Austin Chronicle	2/5 stars
Hot Press	favorable
The Observer	3/5 stars
PopMatters	6/10
Rolling Stone	1/5 stars
The Skinny	2/5 stars
Slant Magazine	3/5 stars
Spin	4/10
Uncut	3/5 stars

Theology is the eighth full-length album by Irish singer Sinéad O'Connor. It was released in 2007 on Rubyworks (and Koch Records in the US). The album consists of two discs, the acoustic "Dublin Sessions" and the full-band "London Sessions".

The first single from Theology is "I Don't Know How to Love Him" (an Andrew Lloyd Webber and Tim Rice song from Jesus Christ Superstar). In the issue dated 14 July 2007, the album entered the US Billboard 200 chart at number 168. The album also debuted in the top 20 of Billboard's Independent Albums list at number 15. First-week sales of the album in the US amounted to 4,700 units, while the record also charted in Ireland, France and Italy.

== Track listing ==
=== Disc one – Dublin Sessions ===
1. "Something Beautiful" (O'Connor) – 5:29
2. "We People Who Are Darker Than Blue" (Curtis Mayfield) – 3:56
3. "Out of the Depths" (O'Connor) – 5:06
4. "Dark I Am yet Lovely" (O'Connor) – 4:11
5. "If You Had a Vineyard" (O'Connor) – 6:18
6. "Watcher of Men" (O'Connor, Ron Tomlinson) – 2:34
7. "33" (O'Connor, Tomlinson) – 2:33
8. "The Glory of Jah" (O'Connor, Tomlinson) – 3:32
9. "Whomsoever Dwells" (O'Connor, Tomlinson) – 2:53
10. "Rivers of Babylon" (Dowe, McNaughton; additional lyrics by O'Connor) – 2:37
11. "Hosanna Filio David" (Traditional) – 0:44

=== Disc two – London Sessions ===
1. "Something Beautiful" (O'Connor) – 5:15
2. "We People Who Are Darker Than Blue" (Curtis Mayfield) – 4:25
3. "Out of the Depths" (O'Connor) – 5:03
4. "33" (O'Connor, Tomlinson) – 2:43
5. "Dark I Am yet Lovely" (O'Connor) – 3:31
6. "I Don't Know How to Love Him" (Andrew Lloyd Webber, Tim Rice) – 4:13
7. "If You Had a Vineyard" (O'Connor) – 6:34
8. "The Glory of Jah" (O'Connor, Tomlinson) – 4:56
9. "Watcher of Men" (O'Connor, Tomlinson) – 3:18
10. "Whomsoever Dwells" (O'Connor, Tomlinson) – 5:34
11. "Rivers of Babylon" (Dowe, McNaughton) – 4:28

The exclusive edition sold at Best Buy stores in the United States includes five additional live tracks, recorded at Dublin's Sugar Club on 8 November 2006. Two of these, "Something Beautiful" and "If You Had a Vineyard," were made available for download on O'Connor's MySpace page in early 2007.

1. "Something Beautiful" – 6:02
2. "If You Had a Vineyard" – 6:36
3. "The Glory of Jah" – 3:51
4. "Whomsoever Dwells" – 3:54
5. "33" – 3:19

The Borders-exclusive edition includes three interviews.

== Personnel ==
- Sinéad O'Connor – vocals, guitar
- Steve Cooney, Hawi Gondwe, Ron Tom (Ron Tomlinson), Sam Cloth Shop – guitar
- Mark Gilmour, Andrew Smith – guitar, bass guitar
- Robbie Shakespeare – bass guitar
- Donald "Don-E" McLean – guitar, bass guitar, piano
- Toby Baker – piano
- Camilla – harp
- Julian Saxi, Neil Williams, Jonah O'Leary – violin
- Diana Tice, Natalie Azario – cello
- Richard Baylis – French horn
- Nathan Tice - flute
- Bev, Chris Brown, Val Staccato – backing vocals
- Tommy "Specs" White, Matthew Phillips – drums, percussion
- John Reynolds – drums and production assistance on "I Don't Know How To Love Him"

== Charts ==
Chart performance for Theology
Chart (2007)	Peak position
Australian Albums (ARIA)	124
Belgian Albums (Ultratop Flanders)	58
Belgian Albums (Ultratop Wallonia)	90
French Albums (SNEP)	81
German Albums (Offizielle Top 100)	86
Irish Albums (IRMA)	18
Italian Albums (FIMI)	56
UK Albums (OCC)	157
UK Independent Albums (Official Charts)	15
US Billboard 200	168
US Independent Albums (Billboard)	15
