= Nyana =

Nyana may refer to:

- New York Association for New Americans
- Nyana Kakoma, Ugandan writer
- Nyana (album)
- Nyana (dinosaur), a genus of sauropodomorph dinosaurs
