= How About I Be Me (and You Be You)? =

Studio album by Sinéad O'Connor
- Released: 20 February 2012
- Recorded: 2007–2011
- Studios: New Air Studios (Kilburn, London)
- Genre: Alternative rock
- Length: 44:59
- Labels: Shamrock Solutions Republic of Ireland, One Little Indian
- Producer: John Reynolds

Sinéad O'Connor chronology
Theology (2007)	How About I Be Me (and You Be You)? (2012)	I'm Not Bossy, I'm the Boss (2014)

Alternative cover
- European edition

Singles from How About I Be Me (and You Be You)?
- 1. "The Wolf Is Getting Married" Released: 27 February 2012; 2. "4th and Vine" Released: 18 February 2013; 3. "Old Lady" Released: 27 May 2013

How About I Be Me (and You Be You)? is the ninth full-length album by Irish singer-songwriter Sinéad O'Connor, released in Ireland on 2 March 2012 on Shamrock Solutions and 5 March 2012 in the United Kingdom on One Little Indian. The first single "The Wolf Is Getting Married" was released on 24 February in Ireland and got to number 40 for one week, accompanied by a video directed by Roman Rappak, lead singer of Breton.

The second single "4th and Vine" was released on 18 February 2013, accompanied by a video directed by Kathryn Ferguson. In 2013 O'Connor announced a European tour in support for the album, called The Crazy Baldhead Tour. Marco Pirroni of Rema Rema and Adam and the Ants plays guitar on the album.

As of 2014, sales in the United States have exceeded 18,000 copies, according to Nielsen SoundScan.

== Critical reception ==
Professional ratings
Aggregate scores
Source	Rating
Metacritic	75/100
Review scores
Source	Rating
AllMusic	3.5/5 stars
Consequence of Sound	3.5/5 stars
Entertainment Weekly	B+
The Guardian	4/5 stars
MusicOMH	4/5 stars
Now	4/5 stars
Pitchfork	7.6/10
PopMatters	7/10
Rolling Stone	3/5 stars
Slant Magazine	3/5 stars

Will Hermes of the magazine Rolling Stone graded the album with three out of five stars and found, "empathy, wit and beauty on... [the] focused LP".

Kitty Empire of The Guardian also graded the album with three out of five stars and declared the album, "feels effervescent, even when the breezy love songs give way to more complex concerns… O'Connor thunders, and the hairs on your arms stand up, electrified… an album that restores O'Connor's reputation as an artist.".

== Track listing ==
How About I Be Me (and You Be You)? track listing
No.	Title	Writer(s)	Length
1.	"4th and Vine"	O'Connor, John Reynolds, Justin Adams	3:58
2.	"Reason with Me"	O'Connor, Geoffrey Smith	4:02
3.	"Old Lady"	O'Connor, Marco Pirroni, Chris Constantinou	3:44
4.	"Take Off Your Shoes"	O'Connor, Reynolds	5:28
5.	"Back Where You Belong"	O'Connor	4:16
6.	"The Wolf Is Getting Married"	O'Connor, Pirroni, Constantinou, Aisling O'Neill	4:23
7.	"Queen of Denmark"	John Grant	4:37
8.	"Very Far from Home"	O'Connor	3:55
9.	"I Had a Baby"	O'Connor, Pirroni, Constantinou, O'Neill	4:11
10.	"V.I.P."	O'Connor	6:36

iTunes bonus tracks
No.	Title	Length
11.	"Song to the Siren"
12.	"I Am Stretched on Your Grave" (live in Reykjavik)

Google Play bonus tracks
No.	Title	Writer(s)	Length
11.	"Factories"	Damien Dempsey	3:42

Live album – limited special edition

This live album was recorded in three different concerts. Songs 1 to 4 at Dublin Olympia Theatre (Dublin), 18 December 2011; songs 5 to 8 at Frikirkjan Church (Reykjavík), 14 October 2011 (during Iceland Airwaves '11); songs 9 to 12 at St. John at Hackney (London), 2 November 2011.

Live album track listing
No.	Title	Length
1.	"4th and Vine"	3:50
2.	"V.I.P."	7:33
3.	"The Lamb's Book of Life"	5:34
4.	"Jackie"	2:56
5.	"Black Boys on Mopeds"	3:57
6.	"This Is a Rebel Song"	3:46
7.	"Three Babies"	4:46
8.	"Nothing Compares 2 U"	5:43
9.	"Old Lady"	3:41
10.	"Reason with Me"	3:22
11.	"I Am Stretched on Your Grave"	5:20
12.	"Last Day of Our Acquaintance"	4:40

== Personnel ==
From album liner notes:

- Sinéad O'Connor – vocals
- Justin Adams (guitar on tracks 1, 2, 3, 5, & 8) Marco Pirroni (guitar on track 3) Kevin Armstrong (guitar on tracks 2-9) Tim Vanderkuil – guitar on tracks 4, 6, & 9)
- Kenny Bogan – acoustic guitar on track 5
- Damien Dempsey – acoustic guitar on track 4
- Caroline Dale – cello on tracks 2, 5, 6, & 10
- Samuel Dixon (bass guitar on tracks 3, & 6), Clare Kenny - bass guitar on tracks 1-9);
- John Reynolds – drums, piano on track 10
- Julian Wilson – keyboards

=== Live album ===
- Sinéad O'Connor – vocals, guitar (tracks 5–8)
- Kieran Kiely – musical director, keyboards, guitar, accordion, low whistle
- Ash Soan – drums (tracks 1–4)
- Yolanda Charles – bass guitar, backing vocals (tracks 1–4 and 9–12)
- Dave Randall – guitar (tracks 1–4 and 9–12)
- Rachael Wood – guitar, backing vocals (tracks 1–4 and 9–12)
- Steve Barney – drums (tracks 9–12)
- Bill Shanley – guitar (tracks 5–8)
- Rachael Dawson – cello on track 10, backing vocals on track 9
- Roisin Waters – backing vocals (tracks 1–4)

== Charts ==
Chart performance for How About I Be Me (and You Be You)?
Chart (2012)	Peak position
Australian Albums (ARIA)	198
Austrian Albums (Ö3 Austria)	42
Belgian Albums (Ultratop Flanders)	54
Belgian Albums (Ultratop Wallonia)	100
Canadian Albums Chart	71
Danish Albums (Hitlisten)	31
Dutch Albums (Album Top 100)	29
French Albums (SNEP)	105
German Albums (Offizielle Top 100)	78
Irish Albums (IRMA)	5
Italian Albums (FIMI)	57
Norwegian Albums (VG-lista)	36
Swedish Albums (Sverigetopplistan)	56
Swiss Albums (Schweizer Hitparade)	69
UK Albums (Official Charts)	33
UK Independent Albums (Official Charts)	7
US Billboard 200	115
US Top Alternative Albums (Billboard)	20
US Top Rock Albums (Billboard)	28
Scottish Albums (Official Charts)	33
