= Rememberings =

2021 memoir by Sinéad O'Connor

- First edition
- Author: Sinéad O'Connor
- Language: English
- Genre: Memoir, autobiography
- Publisher: Penguin Books
- Publication date: 1 June 2021
- Publication place: Ireland
- Pages: 304

Rememberings is a memoir by Sinéad O'Connor published on 1 June 2021 by Sandycove, an imprint of Penguin Books.

== Background ==
O'Connor started writing the book in January 2015. In August that year, she underwent hysterectomy, which was followed by a breakdown and long recovery, leaving her "unable to remember anything much that took place before it". She also attributed memory loss to excessive cannabis smoking. O'Connor resumed writing after a few years' break, and the book's release was announced in December 2020. The memoir is dedicated primarily to "all staff and patients at St Patrick's University Hospital, Dublin".

== Critical reception ==
The memoir received favourable reviews. The Independent included it in their Books of the Month list, saying that Rememberings was "a riveting account of modern celebrity and a deeply candid account of her own “trainwreck” life", adding that O'Connor addresses "the grim truths of sex and power in the modern world". The Christian Century opined that "Rememberings reveals her to be a gifted storyteller as well as a tenderhearted contrarian with a knack for poking a finger in the eyes of the powerful". Writing for RTÉ.ie, Sinéad Crowley complimented the book's "beautifully direct style". The book was also described as "uniquely sharp, insightful, (...) funny", "[i]nspiring, liberating, hilarious and fascinating", and as a "hard-fought, self-built monument to someone who did it her way".

== Commercial performance ==
The book debuted at number one on the Irish bestsellers list, selling 2,982 copies in the first week.
