= Maryfield College =

Location
- Whitehall, Dublin; Ireland
- Coordinates: 53.37598°N 6.23514°W

Information
- Motto: In Fide Stabiles (steadfast in faith)
- Religious affiliation: Catholic
- Established: 1945
- Principal: Rebecca Carroll
- Enrollment: 545 (2024)
- Website: maryfieldcollege.ie

Maryfield College is a voluntary secondary school for girls within the free secondary education system, situated in the grace park area of Dublin, Ireland. The school was founded in 1945 by the Sisters of the Cross and Passion. It is now part of the Le Cheile Schools Trust.

== Notable former pupils ==
- Sinéad O'Connor, musician
