= Midwestern United States =

Census region of the United States

Midwestern United States The Midwest, The Heartland, American Midwest
- Region
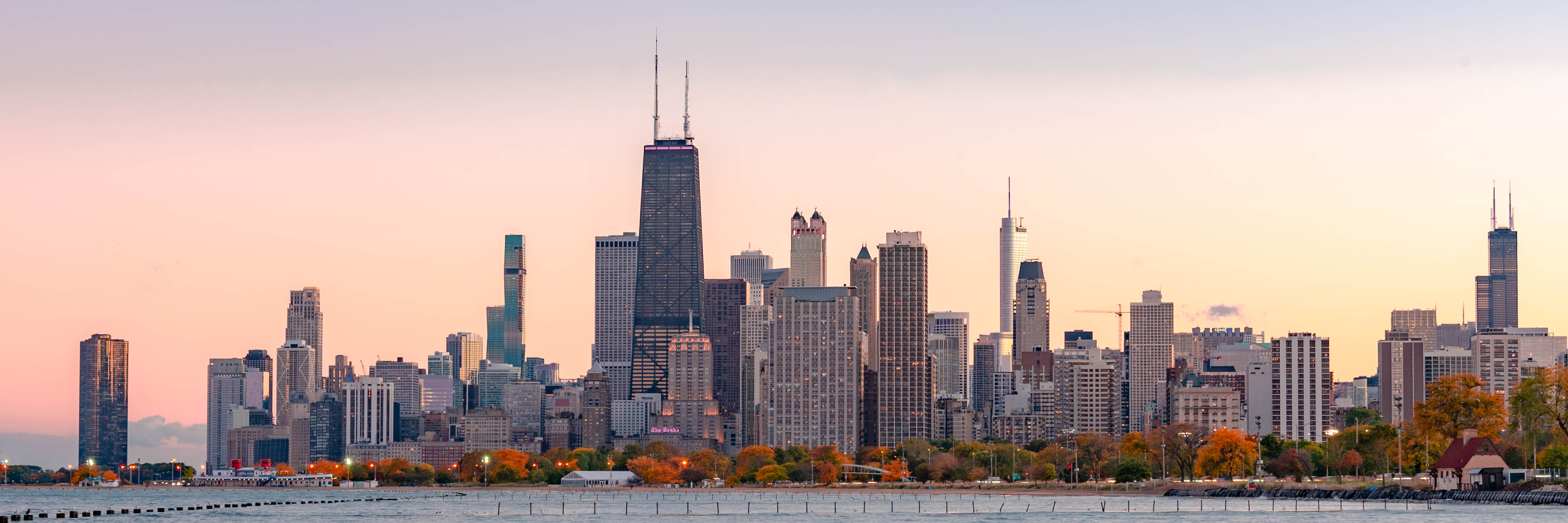
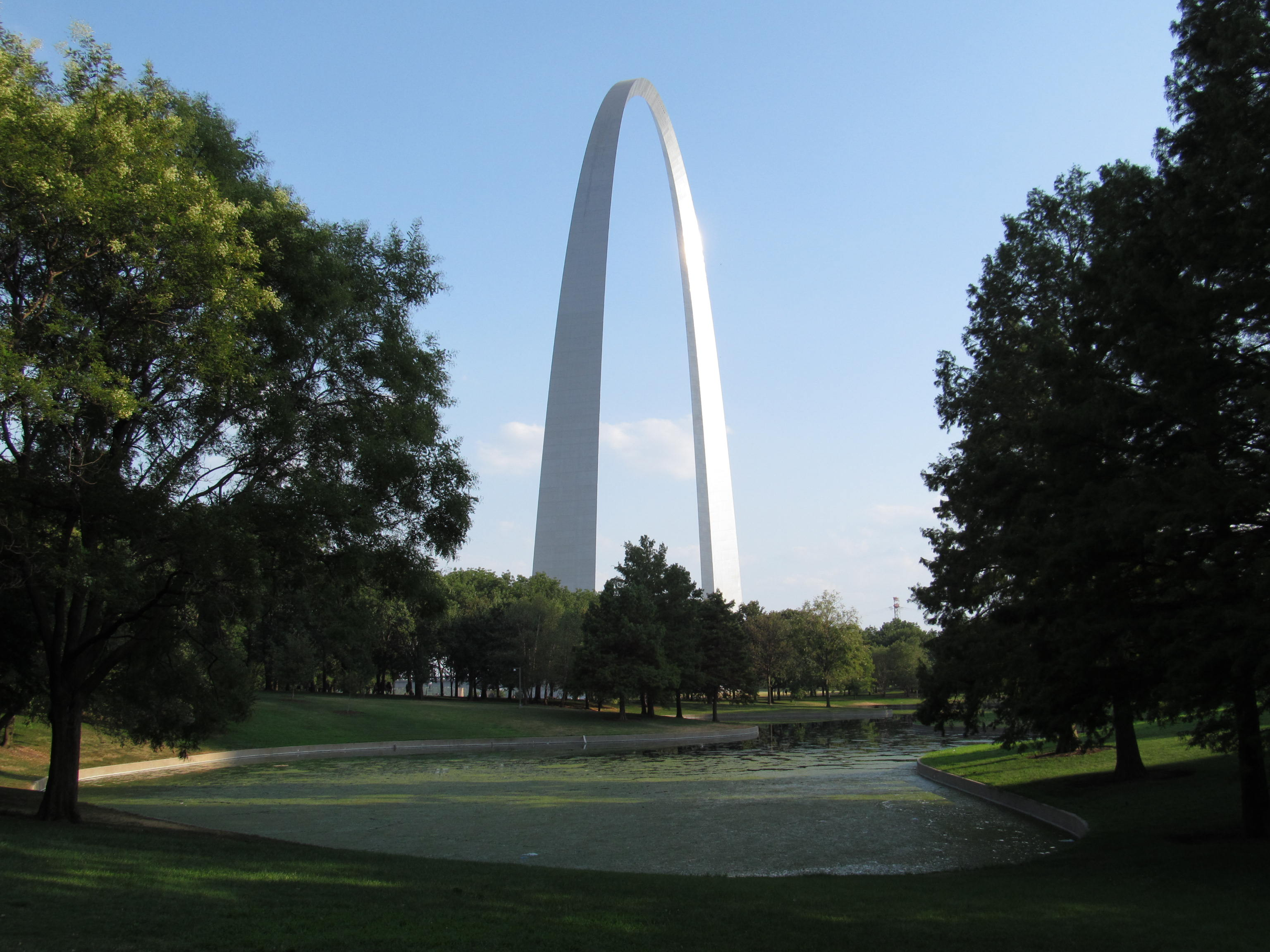
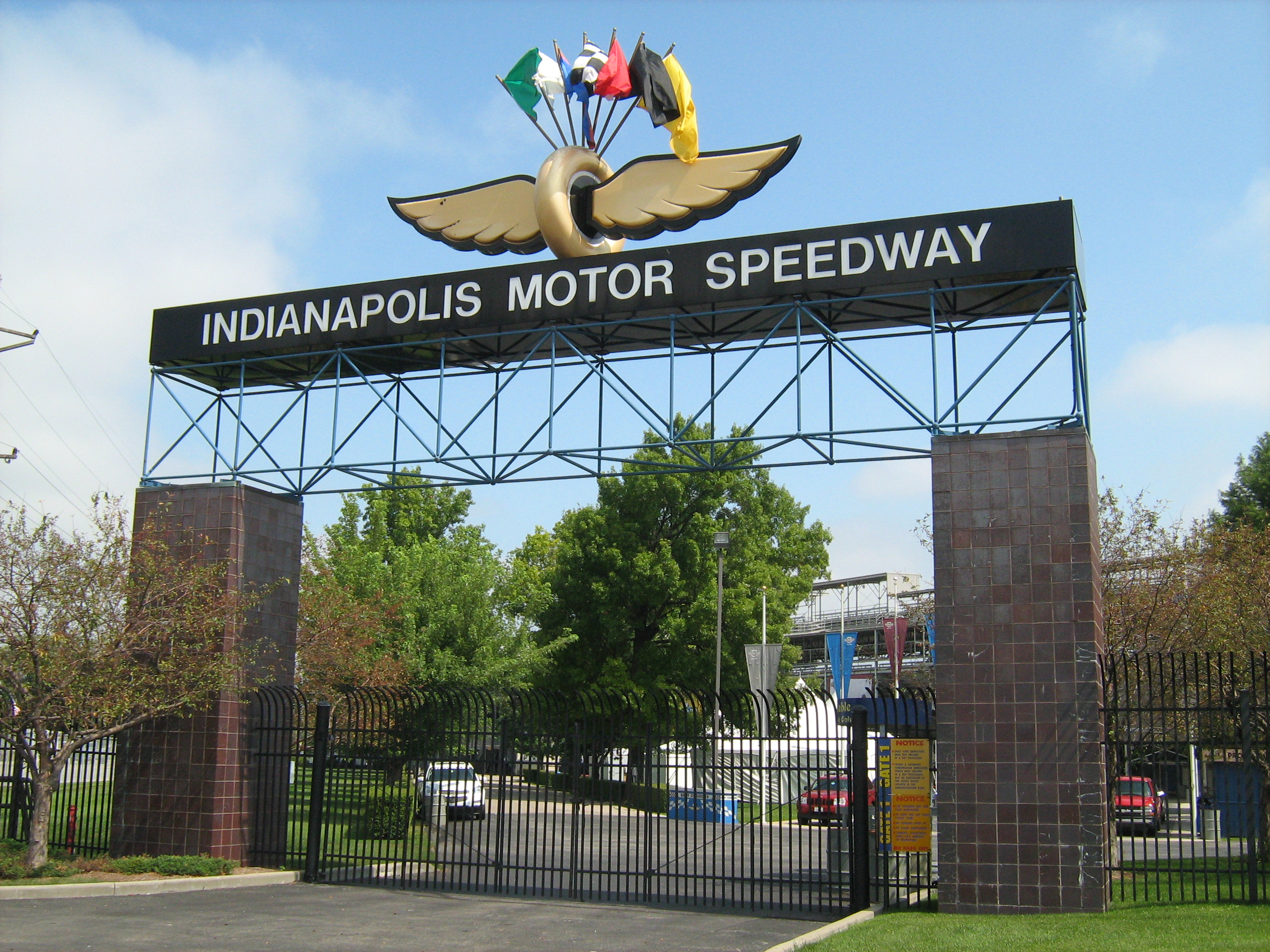
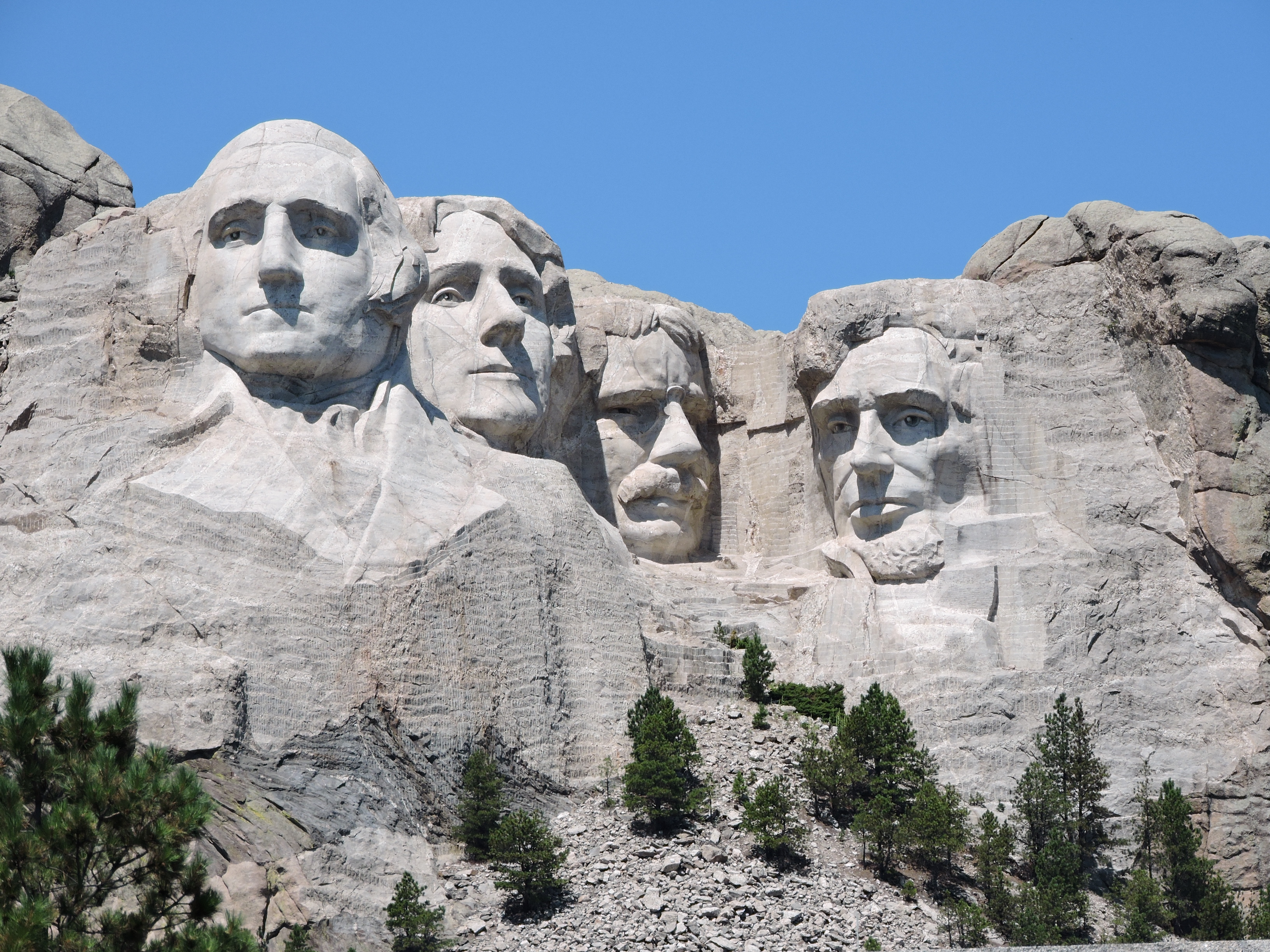
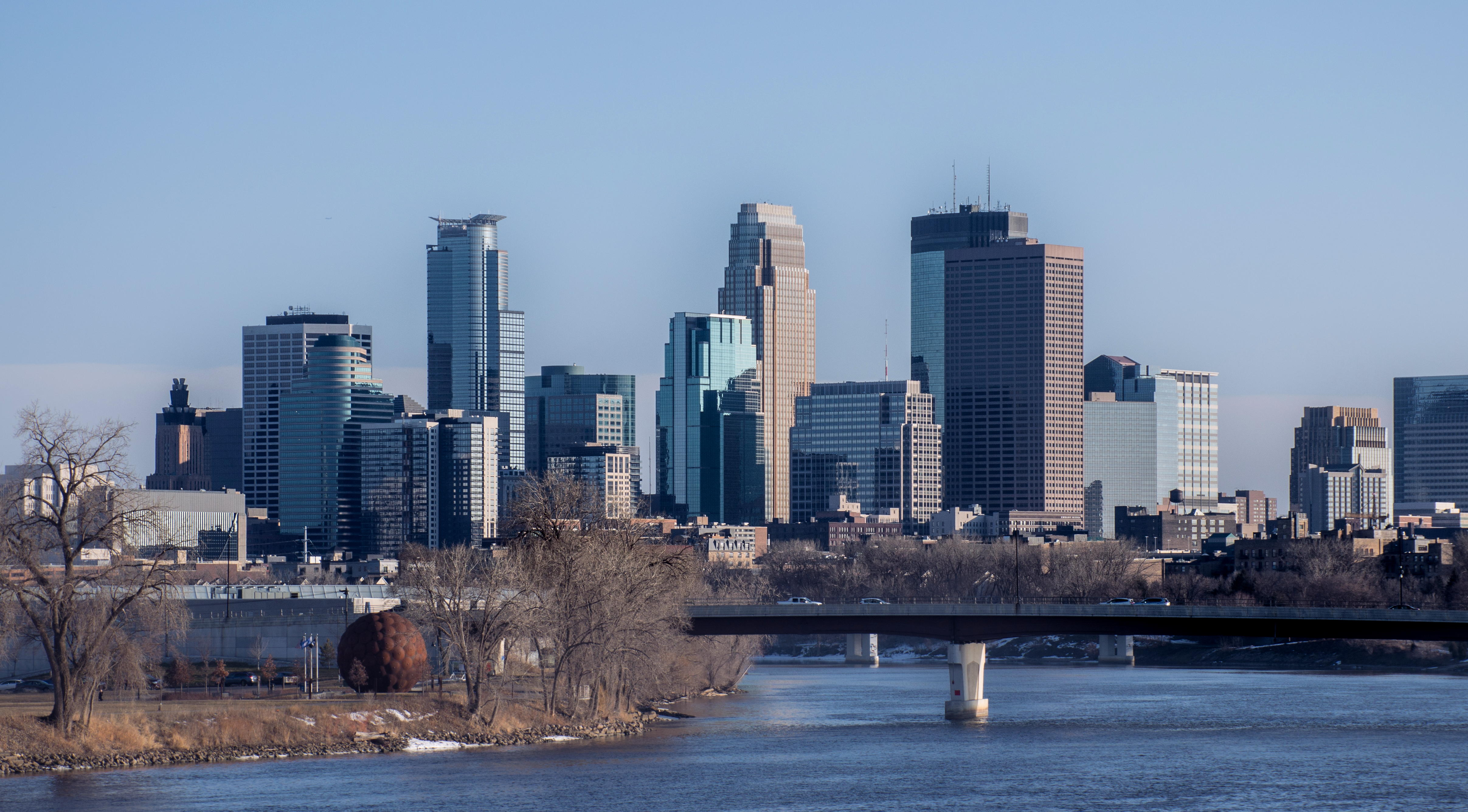
- Chicago Gateway Arch in St. Louis Indianapolis Motor Speedway Detroit Mount Rushmore Chimney Rock in Nebraska Minneapolis

- This map reflects the Midwestern United States as defined by the Census Bureau.
- Subregions: East North Central; West North Central; Upper Midwest; Lower Midwest; Great Lakes; Great Plains
- Country: United States
- States: Illinois, Indiana, Iowa, Kansas, Michigan, Minnesota, Missouri, Nebraska, North Dakota, Ohio, South Dakota, and Wisconsin; as defined by the Census Bureau. Regional definitions might vary slightly among sources.
- Largest metropolitan areas: Chicago; Detroit; Minneapolis–St. Paul; St. Louis; Cincinnati; Kansas City; Columbus; Indianapolis; Cleveland; Milwaukee
- Largest cities: Chicago; Columbus; Indianapolis; Detroit; Milwaukee; Kansas City; Omaha; Minneapolis; Wichita; Cleveland; Cincinnati; St. Paul; St. Louis

Area
  - Total: 750,522 sq mi (1,943,840 km^{2})

Population (2020)
  - Total: 68,985,454
  - Density: 91.9166/sq mi (35.4892/km^{2})
- Demonym: Midwesterner

GDP
  - Total: $5.796 trillion (2025)
  - Per capita: $84,020 (2025)

The Midwestern United States (also referred to as the Midwest, the Heartland, the American Midwest, Middle America, or the Middle West) is one of the four census regions defined by the United States Census Bureau. It occupies the northern central part of the United States. It was officially named the North Central Region by the U.S. Census Bureau until 1984. It is between the Northeastern United States and the Western United States, with Canada to the north and the Southern United States to the south.

The United States Census Bureau's definition consists of 12 states in the north central United States: Illinois, Indiana, Iowa, Kansas, Michigan, Minnesota, Missouri, Nebraska, North Dakota, Ohio, South Dakota, and Wisconsin. The 2020 United States census put the population of the Midwest at just under 69 million. The Midwest is further divided by the U.S. Census Bureau into the East North Central states and the West North Central states. The region generally lies on the broad Interior Plain between the states occupying the Appalachian Mountain range and the states occupying the Rocky Mountain range. Major rivers in the region include, from east to west, the Ohio River, the upper Mississippi River, and the Missouri River.

Chicago is the most populous city in the American Midwest and the third-most populous city in the U.S., with 2.7 million residents in the city proper and 9.4 million in the greater Chicago metropolitan area. Other prominent Midwestern cities, with their metropolitan area populations, include Detroit (4.4 million), the "Twin Cities" of Minneapolis and St. Paul (3.8 million), St. Louis (2.8 million), Cincinnati (2.3 million), Kansas City (2.3 million), Columbus (2.2 million), Indianapolis (2.2 million), Cleveland (2.1 million), Milwaukee (1.6 million), and Omaha (1 million).

The region's economy is a mix of heavy industry and agriculture, with extensive areas forming part of the United States' Corn Belt. Finance and services such as medicine and education are becoming increasingly important. Its central location makes it a transportation crossroads for river boats, railroads, autos, trucks, and airplanes. Politically, the region includes multiple swing states, and therefore is heavily contested and often decisive in elections.

== The West ==
The term West was applied to the region in British America and in the early years of the United States, when the British colonial territories had not extended far from the Atlantic coast and the Pacific seaboard was generally unknown. By the early 19th century, anything west of the Appalachians was considered the American frontier. Over time, the American frontier moved to west of the Mississippi River. During the colonial period, the French settled the upper Mississippi watershed, which included the valleys of the Missouri River and the Illinois River, and called it the Illinois Country. In 1787, the Northwest Ordinance was enacted, creating the Northwest Territory, which was bounded by the Great Lakes and the Ohio and Mississippi Rivers. Some entities in the Midwest have "Northwest" in their names for historical reasons, such as Northwestern University in Illinois.

One of the earliest late 19th-century uses of Midwest was in reference to Kansas and Nebraska to indicate that they were the civilized areas of the West. Another term applied to the same region is Heartland.

== Prehistory ==
=== Precolumbian ===
Among the Native Americans, Paleo-American cultures were the earliest in North America, with a presence in the Great Plains and Great Lakes areas from about 12,000 BCE to around 8,000 BCE.

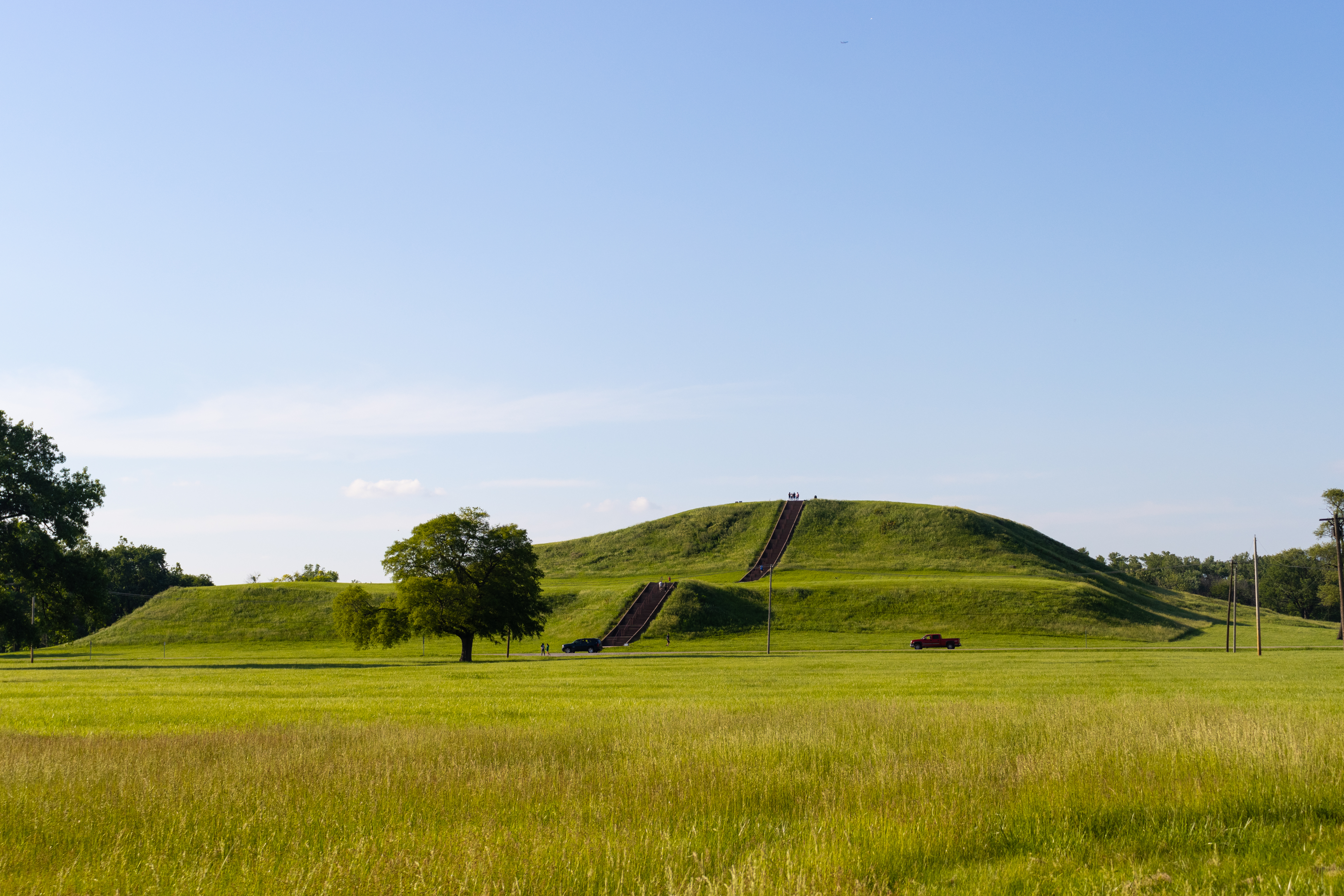
Monks Mound, located at the Cahokia Mounds near Collinsville, Illinois, is the largest Precolumbian earthwork north of Mesoamerica and a World Heritage Site.

Following the Paleo-American period is the Archaic period (8,000 BCE to 1,000 BCE), the Woodland Tradition (1,000 BCE to 100 CE), and the Mississippian Period (900 to 1500 CE). Archeological evidence indicates that Mississippian culture traits probably began in the St. Louis, Missouri area and spread northwest along the Mississippi and Illinois rivers and entered the state along the Kankakee River system. It also spread northward into Indiana along the Wabash, Tippecanoe, and White Rivers.

Mississippian peoples in the Midwest were mostly farmers who followed the rich, flat floodplains of Midwestern rivers. They brought with them a well-developed agricultural complex based on three major crops—maize, beans, and squash. Maize, or corn, was the primary crop of Mississippian farmers. They gathered a wide variety of seeds, nuts, and berries, and fished and hunted for fowl to supplement their diets. With such an intensive form of agriculture, this culture supported large populations.

The Mississippi period was characterized by a mound-building culture. The Mississippians suffered a tremendous population decline about 1400, coinciding with the global climate change of the Little Ice Age. Their culture effectively ended before 1492.

==== Great Lakes Native Americans ====
The major tribes of the Great Lakes region included the Huron, Ottawa, Ojibwe, Potawatomi, Ho-Chunk, Menominee, Sauk, Meskwaki, Neutrals, and the Miami. Most numerous were the Huron and Ho-Chunk. Fighting and battle were often launched between tribes, with the losers forced to flee.

Most are of the Algonquian language family. Some tribes—such as the Stockbridge-Munsee and the Brothertown—are also Algonkian-speaking tribes who relocated from the eastern seaboard to the Great Lakes region in the 19th century. The Oneida belong to the Iroquois language group and the Ho-Chunk of Wisconsin are one of the few Great Lakes tribes to speak a Siouan language. American Indians in this area did not develop a written form of language.

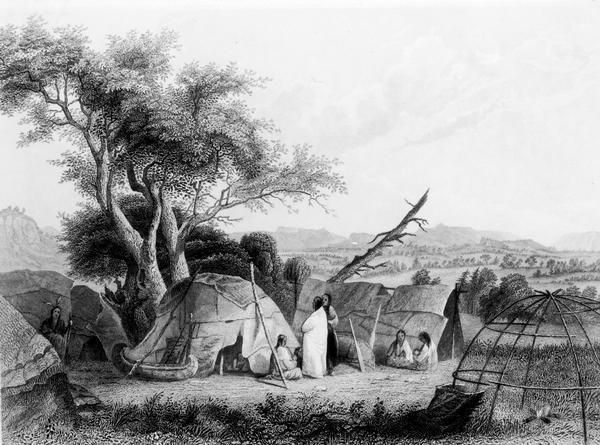
Winnebago family (1852) - Ho-Chunks are often referred to in historical sources by the derogatory exonym, Winnebago

In the 16th century, the natives of the area used projectiles and tools of stone, bone, and wood to hunt and farm. They made canoes for fishing. Most of them lived in oval or conical wigwams that could be easily moved away. Various tribes had different ways of living. The Ojibwe were primarily hunters and fishing was also important in the Ojibwe economy. Other tribes such as Sac, Fox, and Miami, both hunted and farmed.

They were oriented toward the open prairies where they engaged in communal hunts for buffalo (bison). In the northern forests, the Ottawas and Potawatomis separated into small family groups for hunting. The Winnebagos and Menominees used both hunting methods interchangeably and built up widespread trade networks extending as far west as the Rockies, north to the Great Lakes, south to the Gulf of Mexico, and east to the Atlantic Ocean. The Hurons reckoned descent through the female line, while the others favored the patrilineal method. All tribes were governed under chiefdoms or complex chiefdoms. For example, Hurons were divided into matrilineal clans, each represented by a chief in the town council, where they met with a town chief on civic matters. But Ojibwe people's social and political life was simpler than that of settled tribes.

The religious beliefs varied among tribes. Hurons believed in Yoscaha, a supernatural being who lived in the sky and was believed to have created the world and the Huron people. At death, Hurons thought the soul left the body to live in a village in the sky. Ojibwe were a deeply religious people who believed in the Great Spirit. They worshiped the Great Spirit through all their seasonal activities, and viewed religion as a private matter: Each person's relation with his personal guardian spirit was part of his thinking every day of life. Ottawa and Potawatomi people had very similar religious beliefs to those of the Ojibwe.

In the Ohio River Valley, the dominant food supply was not hunting but agriculture. There were orchards and fields of crops that were maintained by indigenous women. Corn was their most important crop.

==== Great Plains Indians ====
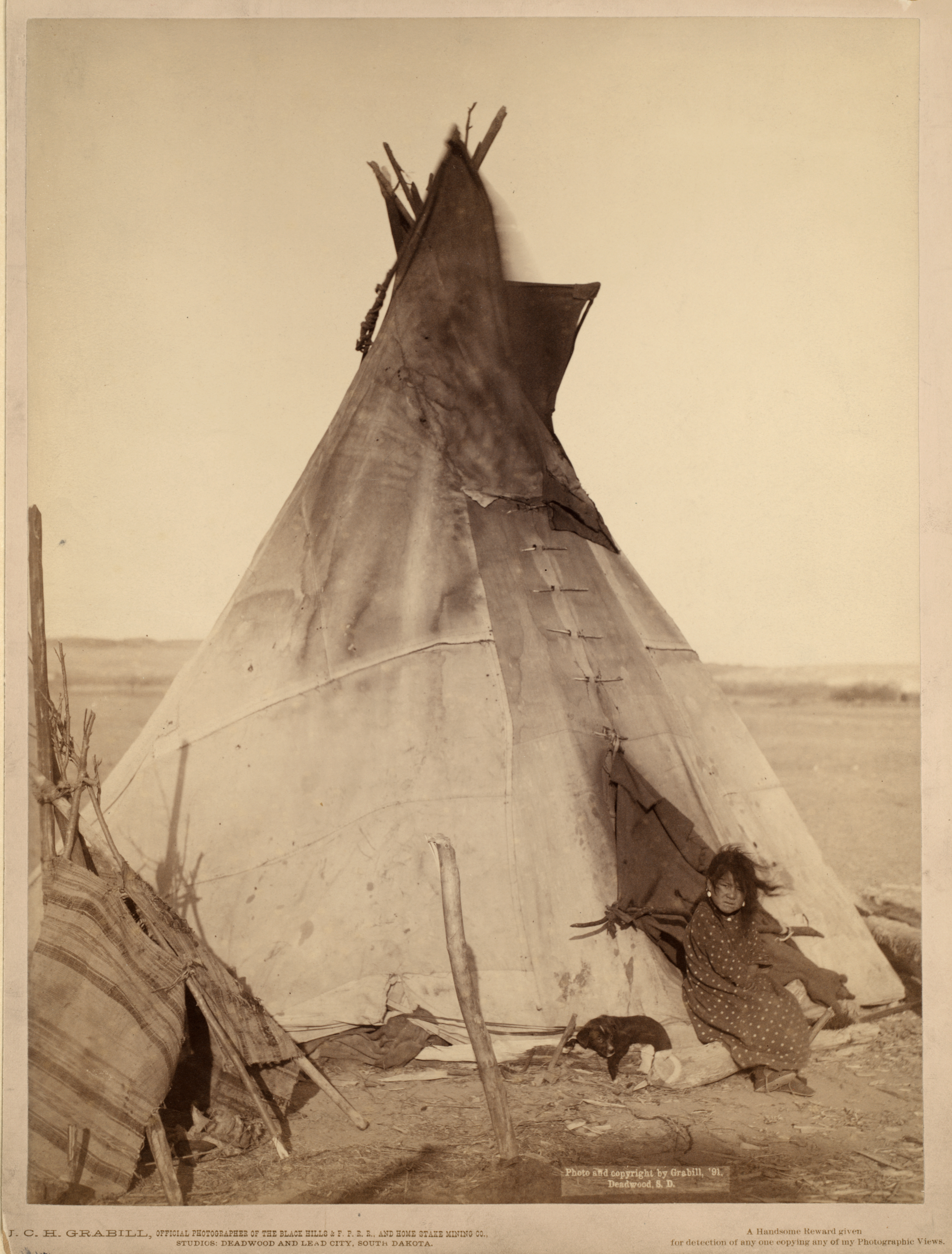
Young Oglala Lakota girl in front of tipi with puppy beside her, probably on or near Pine Ridge Indian Reservation, South Dakota

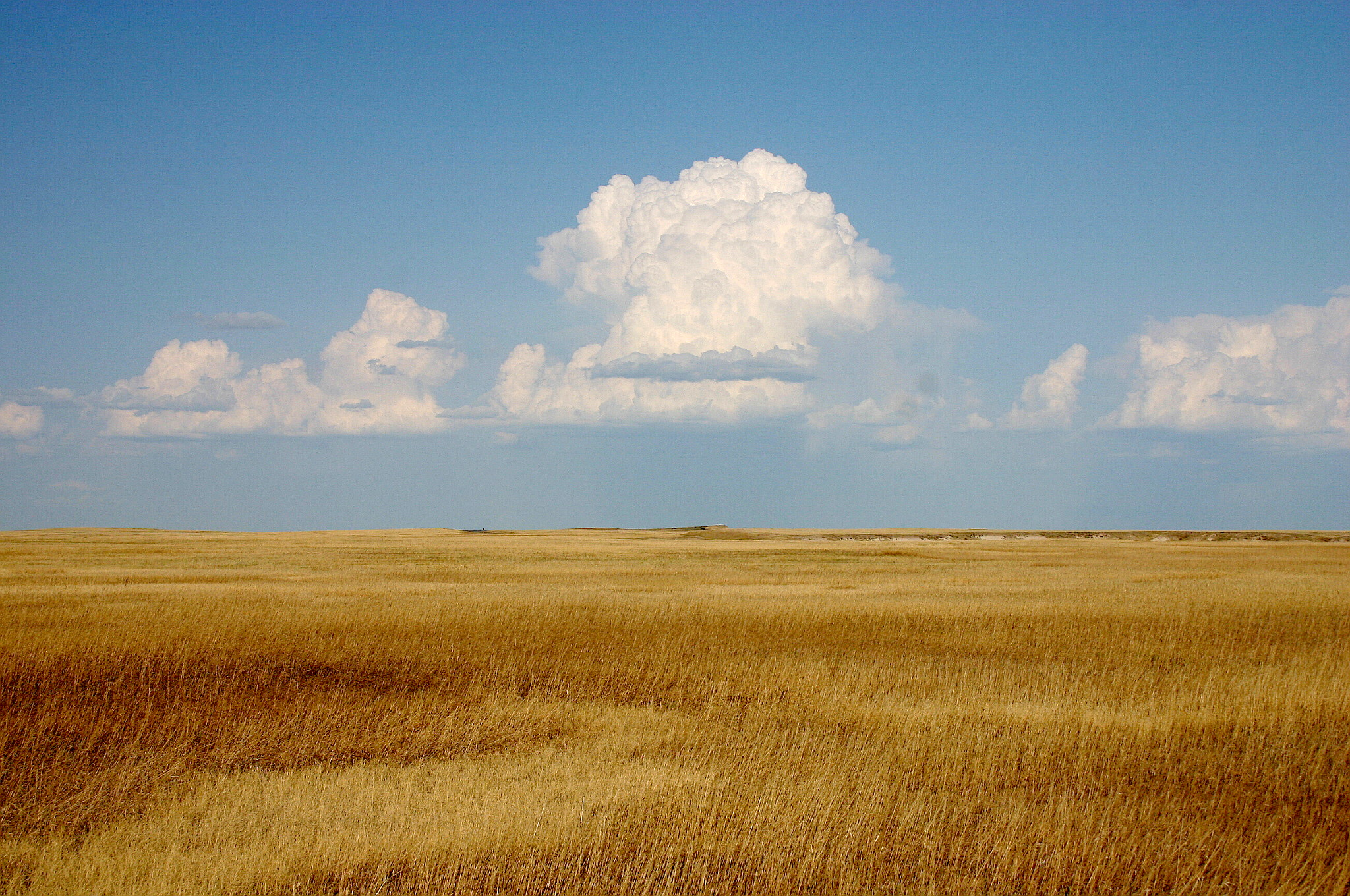
Cumulus clouds hover above a yellowish prairie at Badlands National Park, South Dakota, native lands to the Sioux.

The Plains Indians are the indigenous peoples who live on the plains and rolling hills of the Great Plains of North America. Their equestrian culture and conflicts with settlers and the US Army have made the Plains Indians archetypical in literature and art for American Indians everywhere.

Plains Indians are usually divided into two broad classifications, with some degree of overlap. The first group were fully nomadic, following the vast herds of buffalo. Some tribes occasionally engaged in agriculture, growing tobacco and corn primarily. These included the Blackfoot, Arapaho, Assiniboine, Cheyenne, Comanche, Crow, Gros Ventre, Kiowa, Lakota, Lipan, Plains Apache (or Kiowa Apache), Plains Cree, Plains Ojibwe, Sarsi, Shoshone, Stoney, and Tonkawa.

The second group of Plains Indians (sometimes referred to as Prairie Indians) were the semi-sedentary tribes who, in addition to hunting buffalo, lived in villages and raised crops. These included the Arikara, Hidatsa, Iowa, Kaw (or Kansa), Kitsai, Mandan, Missouria, Nez Perce, Omaha, Osage, Otoe, Pawnee, Ponca, Quapaw, Santee, Wichita, and Yankton.

The nomadic tribes of the Great Plains survived on hunting; some of their major hunts centered on deer and buffalo. Some tribes are described as part of the "Buffalo Culture" (sometimes called, for the American bison). Although the Plains Indians hunted other animals, such as elk or antelope, bison was their primary game food source. Bison flesh, hide, and bones from bison hunting provided the chief source of raw materials for items that Plains Indians made, including food, cups, decorations, crafting tools, knives, and clothing.

The tribes followed the bison's seasonal grazing and migration. The Plains Indians lived in teepees because they were easily disassembled and allowed the nomadic life of following game. When Spanish horses were obtained, the Plains tribes rapidly integrated them into their daily lives. By the early 18th century, many tribes had fully adopted a horse culture. Before their adoption of guns, the Plains Indians hunted with spears, bows, and bows and arrows, and various forms of clubs. The use of horses by the Plains Indians made hunting (and warfare) much easier.

Among the most powerful and dominant tribes were the Dakota or Sioux, who occupied large amounts of territory in the Great Plains of the Midwest. The area of the Great Sioux Nation spread throughout the South and Midwest, up into the areas of Minnesota and stretching out west into the Rocky Mountains. At the same time, they occupied the heart of prime buffalo range, and also an excellent region for furs they could sell to French and American traders for goods such as guns. The Sioux (Dakota) became the most powerful of the Plains tribes and the greatest threat to American expansion.

The Sioux comprise three major divisions based on Siouan dialect and subculture:

- Isáŋyathi or Isáŋathi ("Knife"): residing in the extreme east of the Dakotas, Minnesota and northern Iowa, and are often referred to as the Santee or Eastern Dakota.
- Iháŋktȟuŋwaŋ and Iháŋktȟuŋwaŋna ("Village-at-the-end" and "little village-at-the-end"): residing in the Minnesota River area, they are considered the middle Sioux, and are often referred to as the Yankton and the Yanktonai, or, collectively, as the Wičhíyena (endonym) or the Western Dakota (and have been erroneously classified as Nakota).
- Thítȟuŋwaŋ or Teton (Prairie Dwellers): the westernmost Sioux, known for their hunting and warrior culture, are often referred to as the Lakota.

Today, the Sioux maintain many separate tribal governments scattered across several reservations, communities, and reserves in the Dakotas, Nebraska, Minnesota, and Montana in the United States, as well as Manitoba and southern Saskatchewan in Canada.

== History ==
=== European exploration and early settlement ===
==== The Middle Ground theory ====
The theory of the middle ground was introduced in Richard White's seminal work: The Middle Ground: Indians, Empires, and Republics in the Great Lakes Region, 1650–1815 originally published in 1991. White defines the middle ground like so:

The middle ground is the place in between cultures, peoples, and in between empires and the non state world of villages. It is a place where many of the North American subjects and allies of empires lived. It is the area between the historical foreground of European invasion and occupation and the background of Indian defeat and retreat.

— Richard White, The Middle Ground: Indians, Empires, and Republics in the Great Lakes Region, 1650–1815, p. XXVI

White specifically designates "the lands bordering the rivers flowing into the northern Great Lakes and the lands south of the lakes to the Ohio" as the location of the middle ground. This includes the modern Midwestern states of Ohio, Indiana, Illinois, Wisconsin, and Michigan as well as parts of Canada.

The middle ground was formed on the foundations of mutual accommodation and common meanings established between the French and the Indians that then transformed and degraded as both were steadily lost as the French ceded their influence in the region in the aftermath of their defeat in the Seven Years' War and the Louisiana Purchase.

Major aspects of the middle ground include blended culture, the fur trade, Native alliances with both the French and British, conflicts and treaties with the United States both during the Revolutionary War and after, and its ultimate clearing/erasure throughout the nineteenth century.

==== New France ====
European settlement of the area began in the 17th century following French exploration of the region and became known as New France, including the Illinois Country. The French period began with the exploration of the Saint Lawrence River by Jacques Cartier in 1534 and ending with their cessation of the majority of their holdings in North America to the Kingdom of Great Britain in the Treaty of Paris (1763).

By the Treaty of Paris in 1763, France ceded all of New France east of the Mississippi River, except the environs of New Orleans, to Great Britain. The land to the west of the river was given to Spain.

==== Mapping of the Mississippi River ====
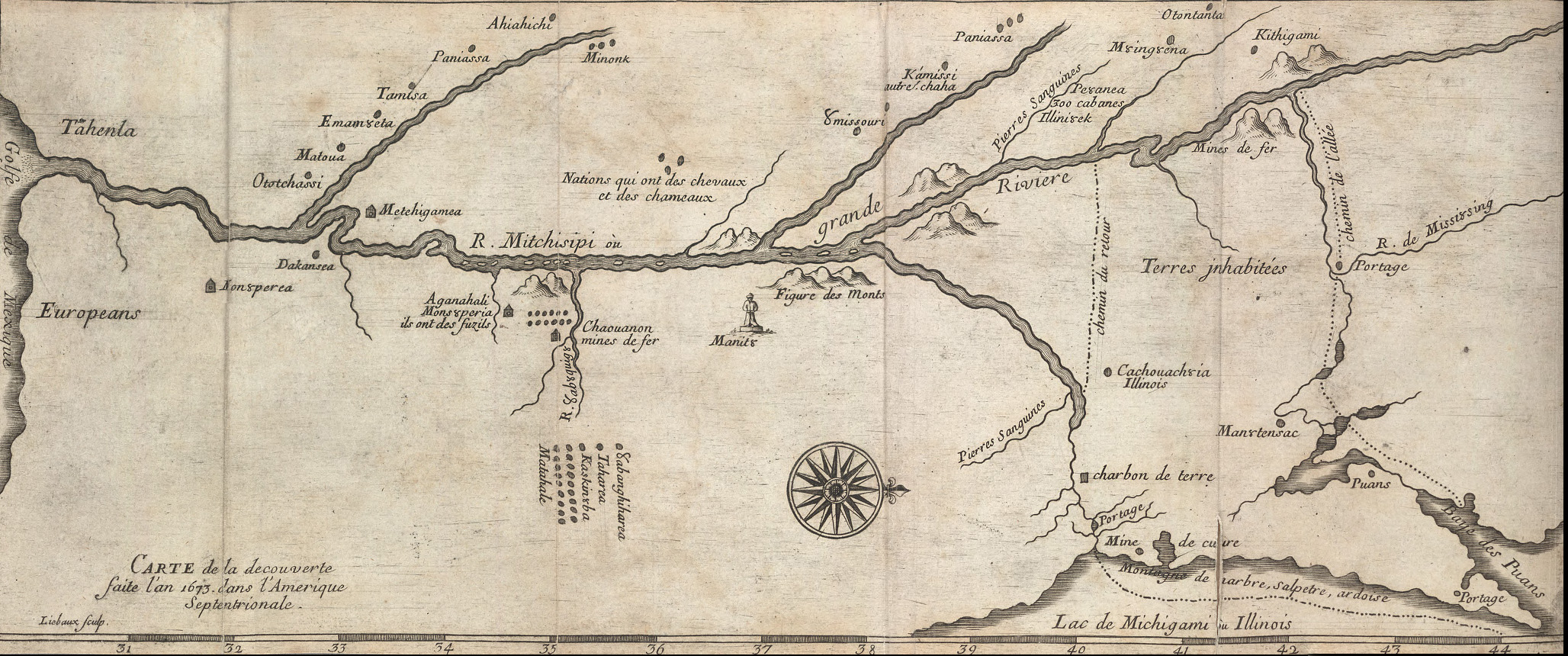
Map by Marquette and Jolliet drawn on their 1673 expedition, published circa 1681

In 1673 the Governor of New France sent Jacques Marquette, a Catholic priest and missionary, and Louis Jolliet, a fur trader, to map the way to the Northwest Passage to the Pacific. They traveled through Michigan's upper peninsula to the northern tip of Lake Michigan. On canoes, they crossed the massive lake and landed at present-day Green Bay, Wisconsin. They entered the Mississippi River on 17 June 1673.

Marquette and Jolliet were the first to map the northern portion of the Mississippi River. They confirmed that it was easy to travel from the St. Lawrence River through the Great Lakes all the way to the Gulf of Mexico by water, that the native peoples who lived along the route were generally friendly, and that the natural resources of the lands in between were extraordinary. New France officials led by LaSalle followed up and erected a 4,000-mile (6,400 km) network of fur trading posts.

=== Fur trade ===
Beaver hunting grounds, the basis of the fur trade

The fur trade was an integral part of early European and Indian relations. It was the foundation upon which their interactions were built and was a system that evolved over time.

Goods often traded included guns, clothing, blankets, strouds, cloth, tobacco, silver, and alcohol.

==== France ====
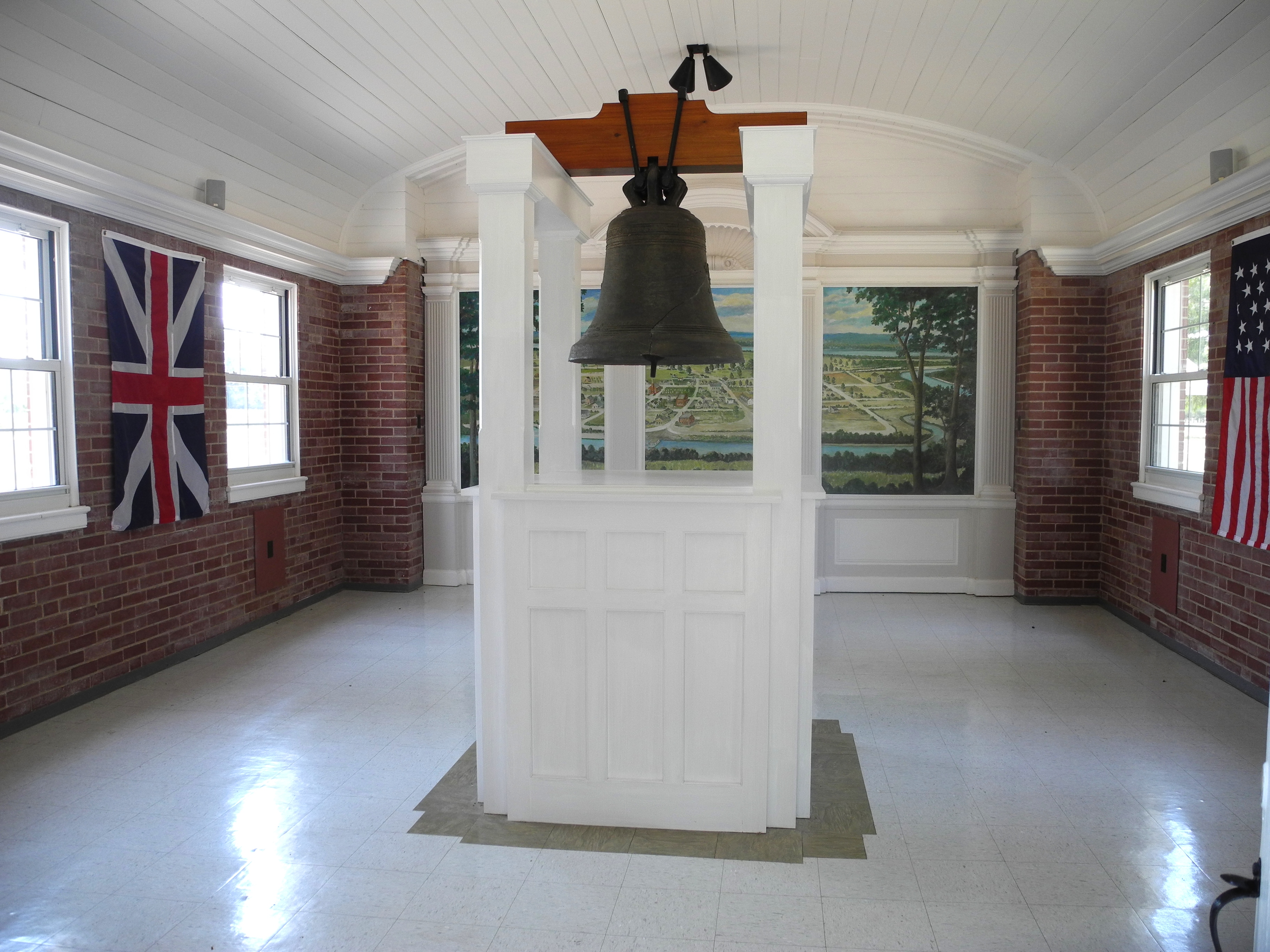
The bell donated by King Louis XV in 1741 to the French mission at Kaskaskia, Illinois. It was later called the "Liberty Bell of the West", after it was rung to celebrate U.S. victory in the Revolution

The French and Indian exchange of goods was called an exchange of gifts rather than a trade. These gifts held greater meaning to the relationship between the two than a simple economic exchange because the trade itself was inseparable from the social relations it fostered and the alliance it created. In the meshed French and Algonquian system of trade, the Algonquian familial metaphor of a father and his children shaped the political relationship between the French and the Natives in this region. The French, regarded as the metaphoric father, were expected to provide for the needs of the Algonquians and, in return, the Algonquians, the metaphoric children, would be obligated to assist and obey them. Traders (voyageurs, coureur des bois) coming into Indian villages facilitated this system of symbolic exchange to establish or maintain alliances and friendships.

Marriage also became an important aspect of the trade in both the Ohio River valley and the French pays d'en haut with the temporary closing of the French fur trade from 1690 to 1716 and beyond. French fur traders were forced to abandon most posts and those remaining in the region became illegal traders who potentially sought these marriages to secure their safety. Another benefit for French traders marrying Indian women was that the Indian women were in charge of the processing of the pelts necessary to the fur trade. Women were integral to the fur trade and their contributions were lauded, so much so that the absence of the involvement of an Indian Woman was once cited as the cause for a trader's failure. When the French fur trade re-opened in 1716 upon the discovery that their overstock of pelts had been ruined, legal French traders continued to marry Indian women and remain in their villages. With the growing influence of women in the fur trade also came the increasing demand of cloth which very quickly grew to be the most desired trade good.

==== Britain ====
English traders entered the Ohio country as a serious competitor to the French in the fur trade around the 1690s. English (and later British) traders almost consistently offered the Indians better goods and better rates than the French, with the Indians being able to play that to their advantage, thrusting the French and the British into competition with each other to their own benefit. The Indian demand for certain kinds of cloth in particular fueled this competition. This, however, changed following the Seven Years' War with Britain's victory over France and the cession of New France to Great Britain.

The British attempted to establish a more assertive relationship with the Indians of the pays d'en haut, eliminating the practise of gift giving which they now saw as unnecessary. This, in combination with an underwhelming trade relationship with a surplus of whiskey, increase in prices generally, and a shortage of other goods led to unrest among the Indians that was exacerbated by the decision to significantly reduce the amount of rum being traded, a product that British merchants had been including in the trade for years. This eventually culminated in Pontiac's War, which broke out in 1763. Following the conflict, the British government was forced to compromise and loosely re-created a trade system that was an echo of the French one.

=== American settlement ===
The state cessions that eventually allowed for the creation of the territories northwest and south of the Ohio River

While French control ended in 1763 after their defeat in the Seven Years' War, most of the several hundred French settlers in small villages along the Mississippi River and its tributaries remained, and were not disturbed by the new British administration. By the terms of the Treaty of Paris, Spain was given Louisiana, the area west of the Mississippi. St. Louis and Ste. Genevieve in Missouri were the main towns, but there was little new settlement. France regained Louisiana from Spain in exchange for Tuscany by the terms of the Treaty of San Ildefonso in 1800. Napoleon had lost interest in re-establishing a French colonial empire in North America following the Haitian Revolution and together with the fact that France could not effectively defend Louisiana from a possible British attack, he sold the territory to the United States in the Louisiana Purchase of 1803. Meanwhile, the British maintained forts and trading posts in U.S. territory, refusing to give them up until 1796 by the Jay Treaty. American settlement began either via routes over the Appalachian Mountains or through the waterways of the Great Lakes. Fort Pitt (now Pittsburgh) at the source of the Ohio River became the main base for settlers moving into the Midwest. Marietta, Ohio in 1787 became the first settlement in Ohio, but not until the defeat of Native American tribes at the Battle of Fallen Timbers in 1794 was large-scale settlement possible. Large numbers also came north from Kentucky into southern Ohio, Indiana and Illinois.

The region's fertile soil produced corn and vegetables; most farmers were self-sufficient. They cut trees and claimed the land, then sold it to newcomers and then moved further west to repeat the process.

==== Squatters ====
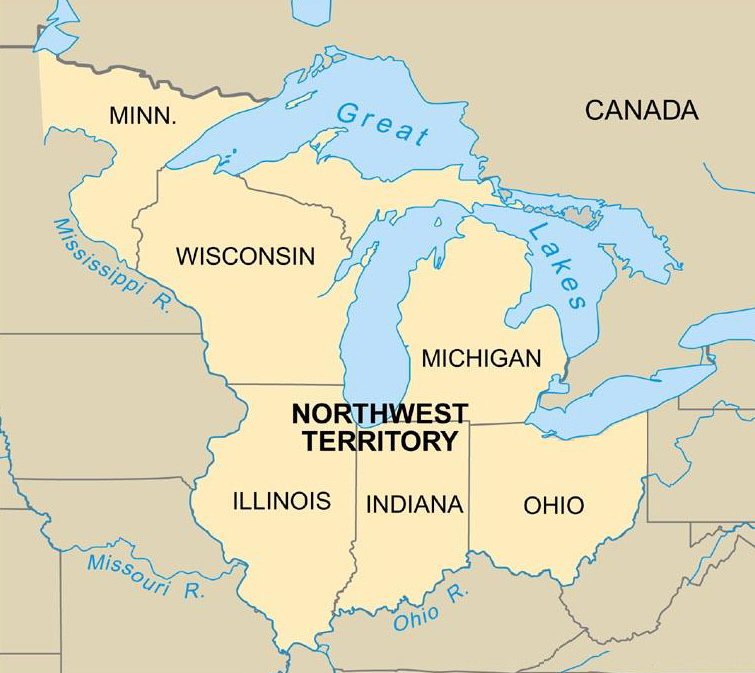
Northwest Territory 1787, with later state divisions

Settlers without legal claims, called "squatters", had been moving into the Midwest for years before 1776. They pushed further and further down the Ohio River during the 1760s and 1770s and sometimes engaged in conflict with the Native Americans. British officials were outraged. These squatters were characterized by British General Thomas Gage as "too Numerous, too Lawless, and Licentious ever to be restrained", and regarded them as "almost out of Reach of Law and government; Neither the Endeavors of Government, or Fear of Indians has kept them properly within Bounds." The British had a long-standing goal of establishing a Native American buffer state in the American Midwest to resist American westward expansion.

With victory in the American Revolution the new government considered evicting the squatters from areas that were now federally owned public lands. In 1785, soldiers under General Josiah Harmar were sent into the Ohio country to destroy the crops and burn down the homes of any squatters they found living there. But overall the federal policy was to move Indians to western lands (such as the Indian Territory in modern Oklahoma) and allow a very large numbers of farmers to replace a small number of hunters. Congress repeatedly debated how to legalize settlements. On the one hand, Whigs such as Henry Clay wanted the government to get maximum revenue and also wanted stable middle-class law-abiding settlements of the sort that supported towns (and bankers). Jacksonian Democrats such as Thomas Hart Benton wanted the support of poor farmers, who reproduced rapidly, had little cash, and were eager to acquire cheap land in the West. Democrats did not want a big government, and keeping revenues low helped that cause. Democrats avoided words like "squatter" and regarded "actual settlers" as those who gained title to land, settled on it, and then improved upon it by building a house, clearing the ground, and planting crops. A number of means facilitated the legal settlement of the territories in the Midwest: land speculation, federal public land auctions, bounty land grants in lieu of pay to military veterans, and, later, preemption rights for squatters. The "squatters" became "pioneers" and were increasingly able to purchase the lands on which they had settled for the minimum price thanks to various preemption acts and laws passed throughout the 1810s-1840s. In Washington, Jacksonian Democrats favored squatter rights while banker-oriented Whigs were opposed; the Democrats prevailed.

==== Native American wars ====
In 1791, General Arthur St. Clair became commander of the United States Army and led a punitive expedition with two Regular Army regiments and some militia. Near modern-day Fort Recovery, his force advanced to the location of Native American settlements near the headwaters of the Wabash River, but on November 4 they were routed in battle by a tribal confederation led by Miami Chief Little Turtle and Shawnee chief Blue Jacket. More than 600 soldiers and scores of women and children were killed in the battle, which has since borne the name "St. Clair's Defeat". It remains the greatest defeat of a U.S. Army by Native Americans.

The British demanded the establishment of a Native American barrier state at the Treaty of Ghent which ended the War of 1812, but American negotiators rejected the idea because Britain had lost control of the region in the Battle of Lake Erie and the Battle of the Thames in 1813, where Tecumseh was killed by U.S. forces. The British then abandoned their Native American allies south of the lakes. The Native Americans ended being the main losers in the War of 1812. Apart from the short Black Hawk War of 1832, the days of Native American warfare east of the Mississippi River had ended.

==== Lewis and Clark ====
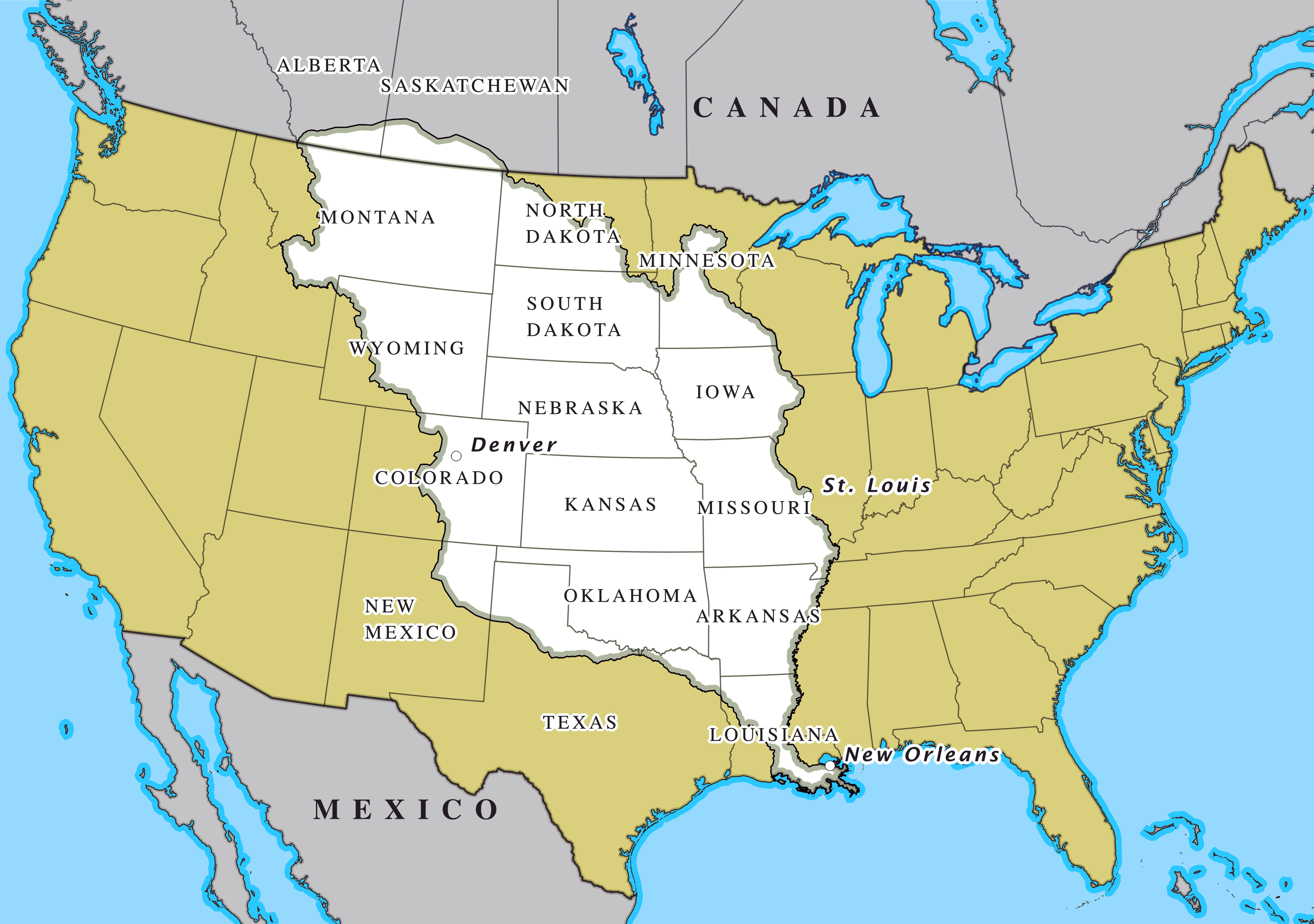
Louisiana Purchase 1803

In 1803, President Thomas Jefferson commissioned the Lewis and Clark Expedition that took place between May 1804 and September 1806. Launching from Camp Dubois in Illinois (at that time part of the Indiana Territory), the goal was to explore the Louisiana Purchase, and establish trade and U.S. sovereignty over the native peoples along the Missouri River. The Lewis and Clark Expedition established relations with more than two dozen indigenous nations west of the Missouri River. The Expedition returned east to St. Louis in the spring of 1806.

=== Party politics ===
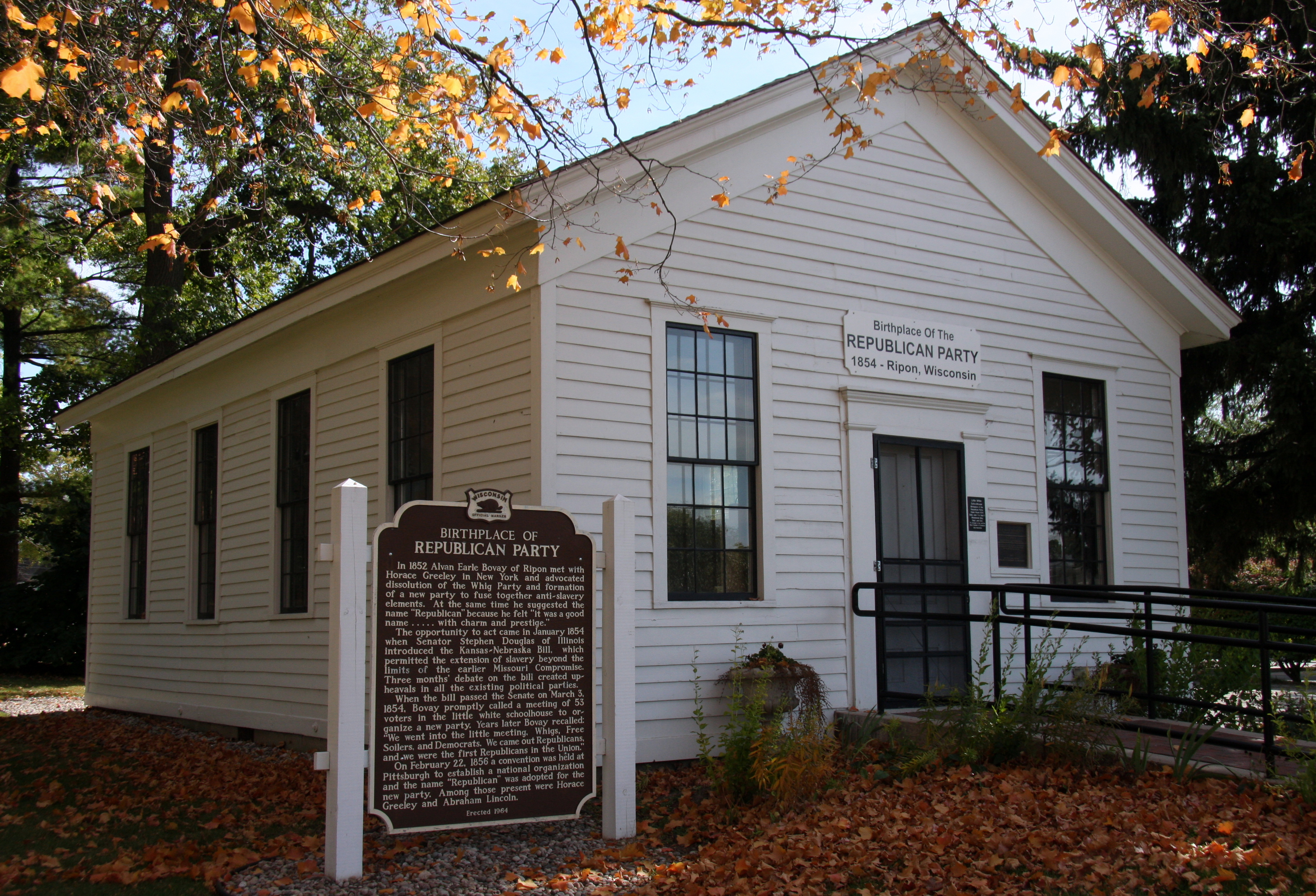
The first local meeting of the new Republican Party took place at the Little White Schoolhouse in Ripon, Wisconsin on March 20, 1854.

The Midwest has been a key swing district in national elections, with highly contested elections in closely divided states often deciding the national result. From 1860 to 1920, both parties tried to find their presidential and vice presidential candidates from the region.

One of the two major political parties in the United States, the Republican Party, originated in the Midwest in the 1850s; Ripon, Wisconsin, had the first local meeting while Jackson, Michigan, had the first statewide meeting of the new party. Its membership included many Yankees out of New England and New York who had settled the upper Midwest. The party opposed the expansion of slavery and stressed the Protestant ideals of thrift, a hard work ethic, self-reliance, democratic decision making, and religious tolerance.

In the early 1890s, the wheat-growing regions were strongholds of the short-lived Populist movement in the Plains states.

Starting in the 1890s, the middle class urban Progressive movement became influential in the region (as it was in other regions), with Wisconsin a major center. Under the La Follettes, Wisconsin fought against the Republican bosses and for efficiency, modernization, and the use of experts to solve social, economic, and political problems.

Theodore Roosevelt's 1912 Progressive Party had the best showing in this region, carrying the states of Michigan, Minnesota, and South Dakota. In 1924, La Follette, Sr.'s 1924 Progressive Party did well in the region, but carried only his home base of Wisconsin.

The Midwest—especially the areas west of Chicago—has always been a stronghold of isolationism, a belief that America should not involve itself in foreign entanglements. This position was largely based on the many German American and Swedish-American communities. Isolationist leaders included the La Follettes, Ohio's Robert A. Taft, and Colonel Robert McCormick, publisher of the Chicago Tribune.

==== Yankees and ethnocultural politics ====
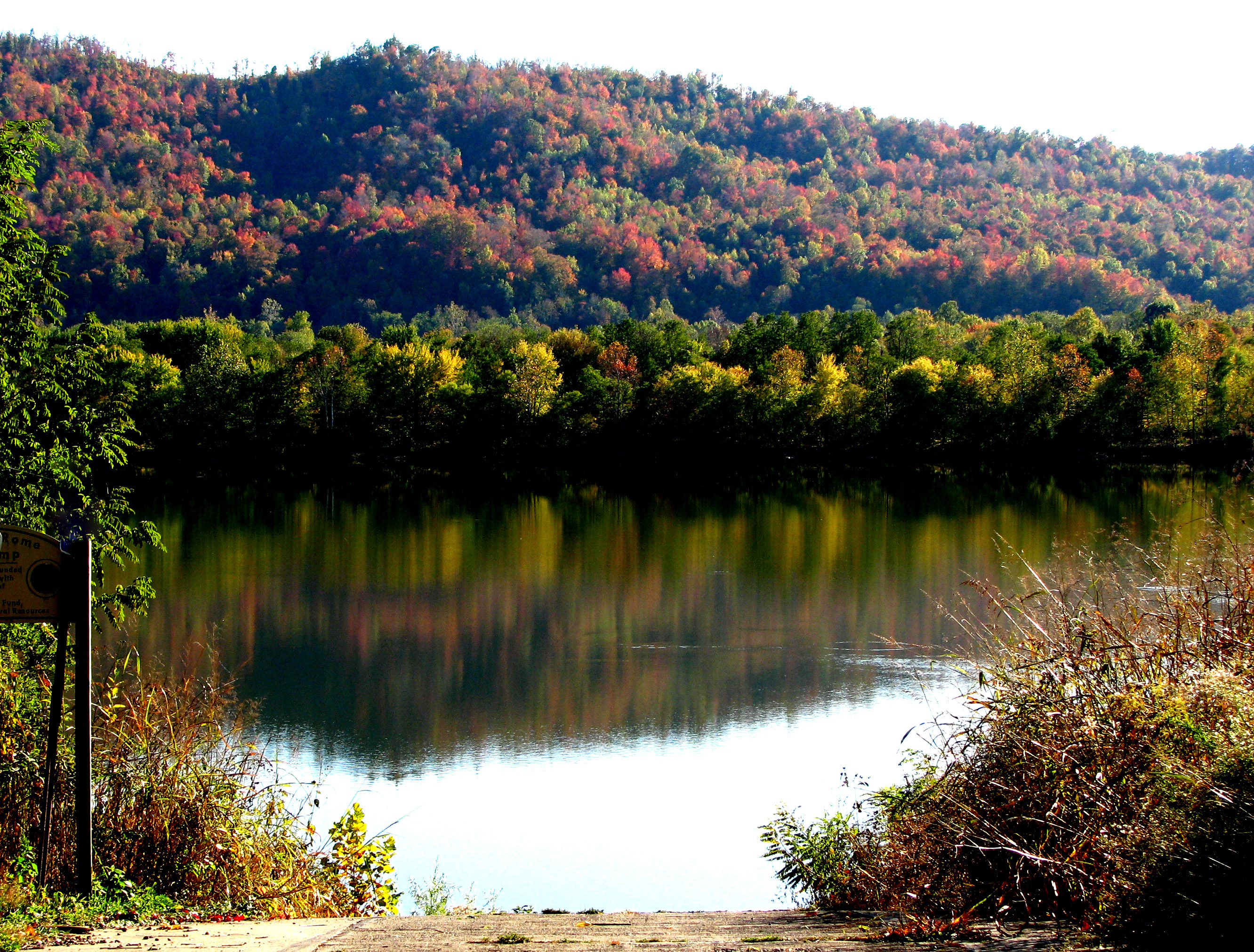
Ohio River near Rome, Ohio

Yankee settlers from New England started arriving in Ohio before 1800, and spread throughout the northern half of the Midwest. Most of them started as farmers, but later the larger proportion moved to towns and cities as entrepreneurs, businessmen, and urban professionals. Since its beginnings in the 1830s, Chicago has grown to dominate the Midwestern metropolis landscape for over a century.

Historian John Bunker has examined the worldview of the Yankee settlers in the Midwest:

Because they arrived first and had a strong sense of community and mission, Yankees were able to transplant New England institutions, values, and mores, altered only by the conditions of frontier life. They established a public culture that emphasized the work ethic, the sanctity of private property, individual responsibility, faith in residential and social mobility, practicality, piety, public order and decorum, reverence for public education, activists, honest and frugal government, town meeting democracy, and he believed that there was a public interest that transcends particular and stick ambitions. Regarding themselves as the elect and just in a world rife with sin, air, and corruption, they felt a strong moral obligation to define and enforce standards of community and personal behavior....This pietistic worldview was substantially shared by British, Scandinavian, Swiss, English-Canadian and Dutch Reformed immigrants, as well as by German Protestants and many of the Forty-Eighters.

Midwestern politics pitted Yankees against the German Catholics and Lutherans, who were often led by the Irish Catholics. These large groups, Buenker argues:

Generally subscribed to the work ethic, a strong sense of community, and activist government, but were less committed to economic individualism and privatism and ferociously opposed to government supervision of the personal habits. Southern and eastern European immigrants generally leaned more toward the Germanic view of things, while modernization, industrialization, and urbanization modified nearly everyone's sense of individual economic responsibility and put a premium on organization, political involvement, and education.

=== Development of transportation ===
==== Waterways ====
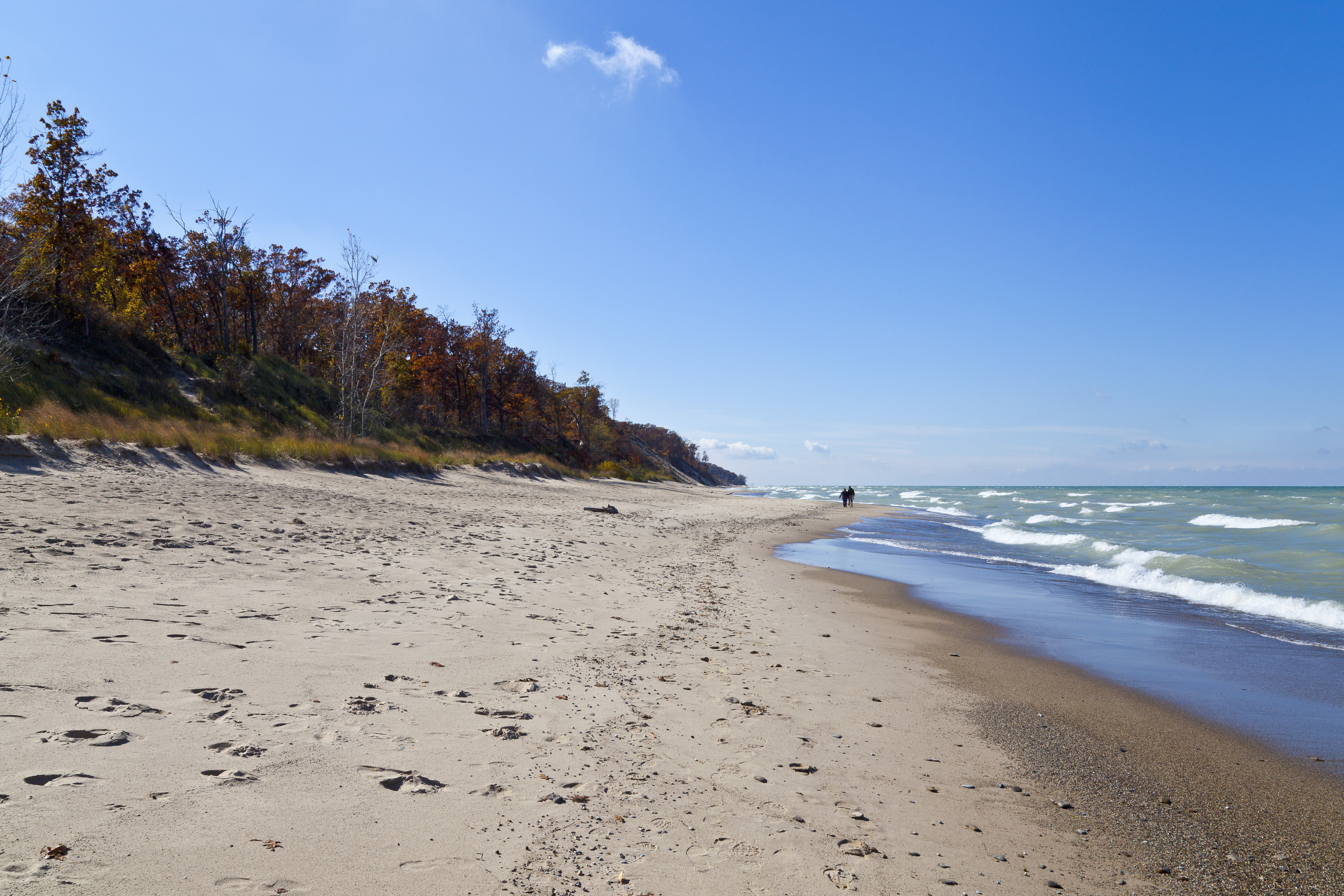
Lake Michigan is shared by Illinois, Indiana, Michigan, and Wisconsin. Pictured is Indiana Dunes National Park in northwest Indiana.

Three waterways have been important to the development of the Midwest. The first and foremost was the Ohio River, which flowed into the Mississippi River. Development of the region was halted until 1795 by Spain's control of the southern part of the Mississippi and its refusal to allow the shipment of American crops down the river and into the Atlantic Ocean. This was changed with the 1795 signing of Pinckney's Treaty.

The second waterway is the network of routes within the Great Lakes. The opening of the Erie Canal in 1825 completed an all-water shipping route, more direct than the Mississippi, to New York and the seaport of New York City. In 1848, The Illinois and Michigan Canal breached the continental divide spanning the Chicago Portage and linking the waters of the Great Lakes with those of the Mississippi Valley and the Gulf of Mexico. Lakeport and river cities grew up to handle these new shipping routes. During the Industrial Revolution, the lakes became a conduit for iron ore from the Mesabi Range of Minnesota to steel mills in the Mid-Atlantic States. The Saint Lawrence Seaway, completed in 1959, opened the Midwest to the Atlantic Ocean.

The third waterway, the Missouri River, extended water travel from the Mississippi almost to the Rocky Mountains.

In the 1870s and 1880s, the Mississippi River inspired two classic books—Life on the Mississippi and Adventures of Huckleberry Finn—written by native Missourian Samuel Clemens, who used the pseudonym Mark Twain. His stories became staples of Midwestern lore. Twain's hometown of Hannibal, Missouri, is a tourist attraction offering a glimpse into the Midwest of his time.

Inland canals in Ohio and Indiana constituted another important waterway, which connected with Great Lakes and Ohio River traffic. The commodities that the Midwest funneled into the Erie Canal down the Ohio River contributed to the wealth of New York City, which overtook Boston and Philadelphia.

==== Railroads and the automobile ====
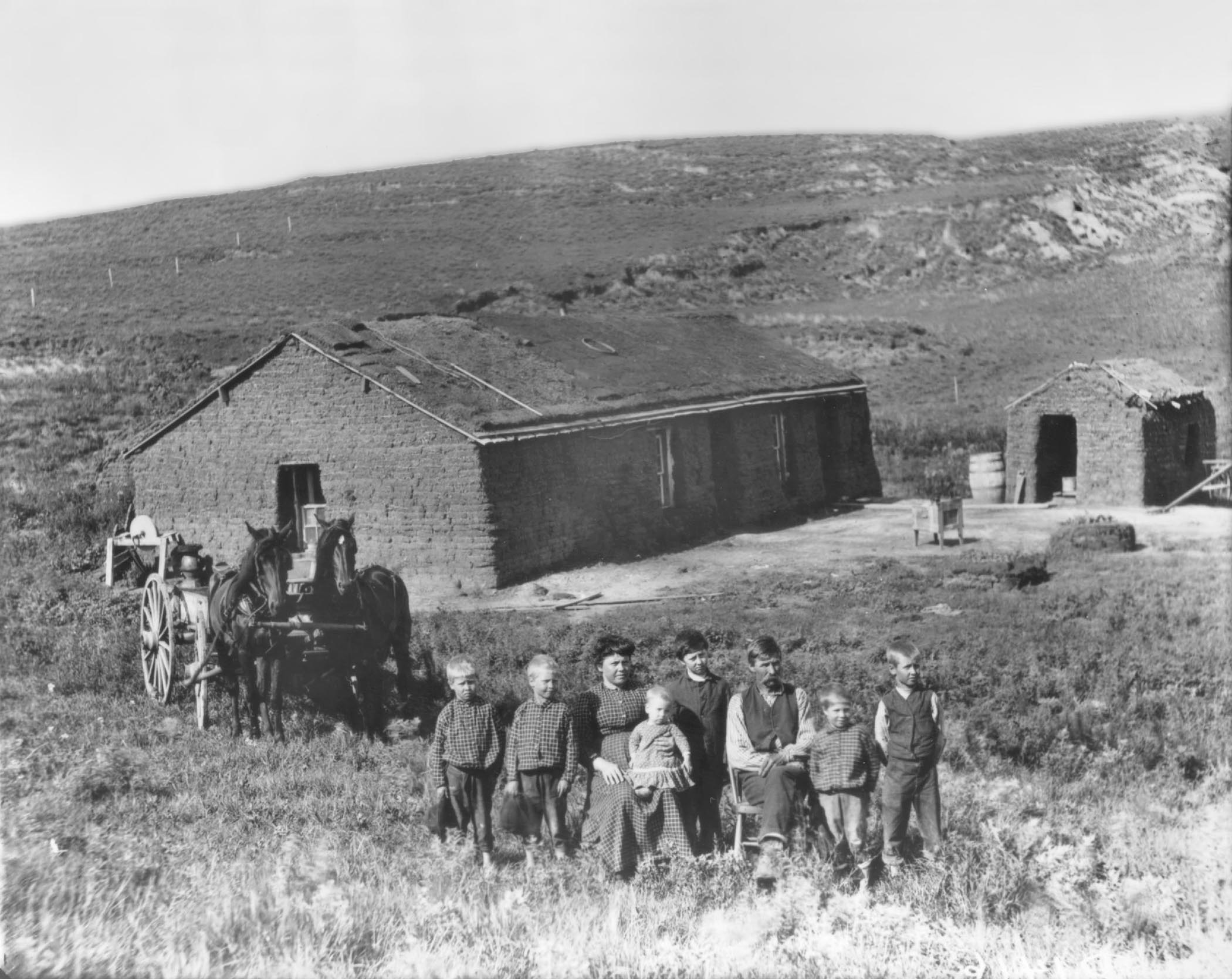
Homesteaders in central Nebraska in 1888

During the mid-19th century, the region got its first railroads, and the railroad junction in Chicago became the world's largest. During the century, Chicago became the nation's railroad center. By 1910, over 20 railroads operated passenger service out of six different downtown terminals. Even today, a century after Henry Ford, six Class I railroads (Union Pacific, BNSF, Norfolk Southern, CSX, Canadian National, and Canadian Pacific) meet in Chicago.

In the period from 1890 to 1930, many Midwestern cities were connected by electric interurban railroads, similar to streetcars. The Midwest had more interurbans than any other region. In 1916, Ohio led all states with 2,798 miles (4,503 km), Indiana followed with 1,825 miles (2,937 km). These two states alone had almost a third of the country's interurban trackage. The nation's largest interurban junction was in Indianapolis. During the decade of the early 1900s, that city's 38 percent growth in population was attributed largely to the interurban.

Competition with automobiles and buses undermined the interurban and other railroad passenger business. By 1900, Detroit was the world center of the auto industry, and soon practically every city within 200 miles (320 km) was producing auto parts that fed into its giant factories.

In 1903, Henry Ford founded the Ford Motor Company. Ford's manufacturing—and those of automotive pioneers William C. Durant, the Dodge brothers, Packard, and Walter Chrysler—established Detroit's status in the early 20th century as the world's automotive capital. The proliferation of businesses created a synergy that also encouraged truck manufacturers such as Rapid and Grabowsky.

The growth of the auto industry was reflected by changes in businesses throughout the Midwest and nation, with the development of garages to service vehicles and gas stations, as well as factories for parts and tires. Today, greater Detroit remains home to General Motors, Chrysler, and the Ford Motor Company.

=== American Civil War ===
==== Slavery prohibition and the Underground Railroad ====
An animation depicting when United States territories and states forbade or allowed slavery, 1789–1861

The Northwest Ordinance region, comprising the heart of the Midwest, was the first large region of the United States that prohibited slavery (the Northeastern United States emancipated slaves into the 1830s). The regional southern boundary was the Ohio River, the border of freedom and slavery in American history and literature (see Uncle Tom's Cabin by Harriet Beecher Stowe and Beloved by Toni Morrison).

The Midwest, particularly Ohio, provided the primary routes for the Underground Railroad, whereby Midwesterners assisted slaves to freedom from their crossing of the Ohio River through their departure on Lake Erie to Canada. Created in the early 19th century, the Underground Railroad was at its height between 1850 and 1860. One estimate suggests that by 1850, 100,000 slaves had escaped via the Underground Railroad.

The Underground Railroad consisted of meeting points, secret routes, transportation, and safe houses and assistance provided by abolitionist sympathizers. Individuals were often organized in small, independent groups; this helped to maintain secrecy because individuals knew some connecting "stations" along the route, but knew few details of their immediate area. Escaped slaves moved north along the route from one way station to the next. Although the fugitives sometimes traveled on boat or train, they usually traveled on foot or by wagon.

The region was shaped by the relative absence of slavery (except for Missouri), pioneer settlement, education in one-room free public schools, democratic notions brought by American Revolutionary War veterans, Protestant faiths and experimentation, and agricultural wealth transported on the Ohio River riverboats, flatboats, canal boats, and railroads.

==== Bleeding Kansas ====
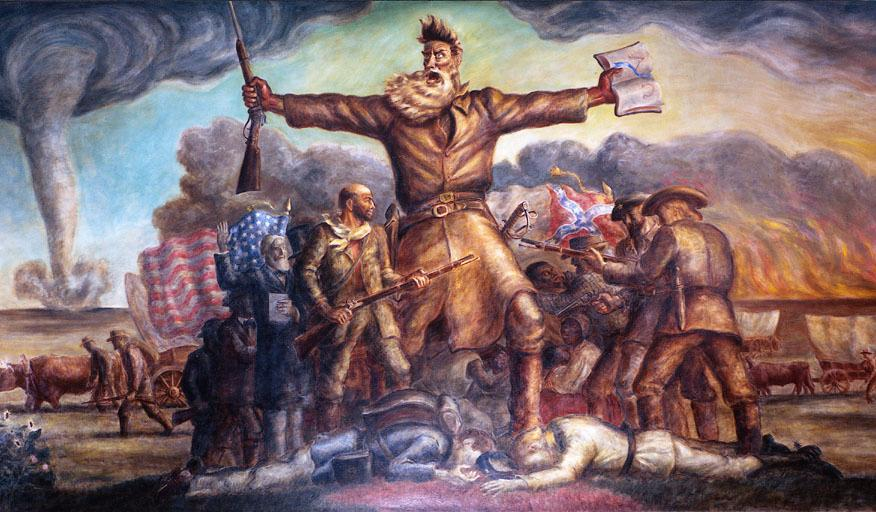
Tragic Prelude, in the Kansas State Capitol

The first violent conflicts leading up to the American Civil War occurred between two neighboring Midwestern states, Kansas and Missouri, involving anti-slavery Free-Staters and pro-slavery "Border Ruffian" elements, that took place in the Kansas Territory and the western frontier towns of Missouri roughly between 1854 and 1858. At the heart of the conflict was the question of whether Kansas would enter the Union as a free state or slave state. As such, Bleeding Kansas was a proxy war between Northerners and Southerners over the issue of slavery. The term "Bleeding Kansas" was coined by Horace Greeley of the New-York Tribune.

The immediate cause of the events was the Kansas–Nebraska Act of 1854. The Act created the territories of Kansas and Nebraska, opened new lands that would help settlement in them, repealed the Missouri Compromise, and allowed settlers in those territories to determine through popular sovereignty whether to allow slavery within their boundaries. It was hoped the Act would ease relations between the North and the South, because the South could expand slavery to new territories, but the North still had the right to abolish slavery in its states. Instead, opponents denounced the law as a concession to the slave power of the South.

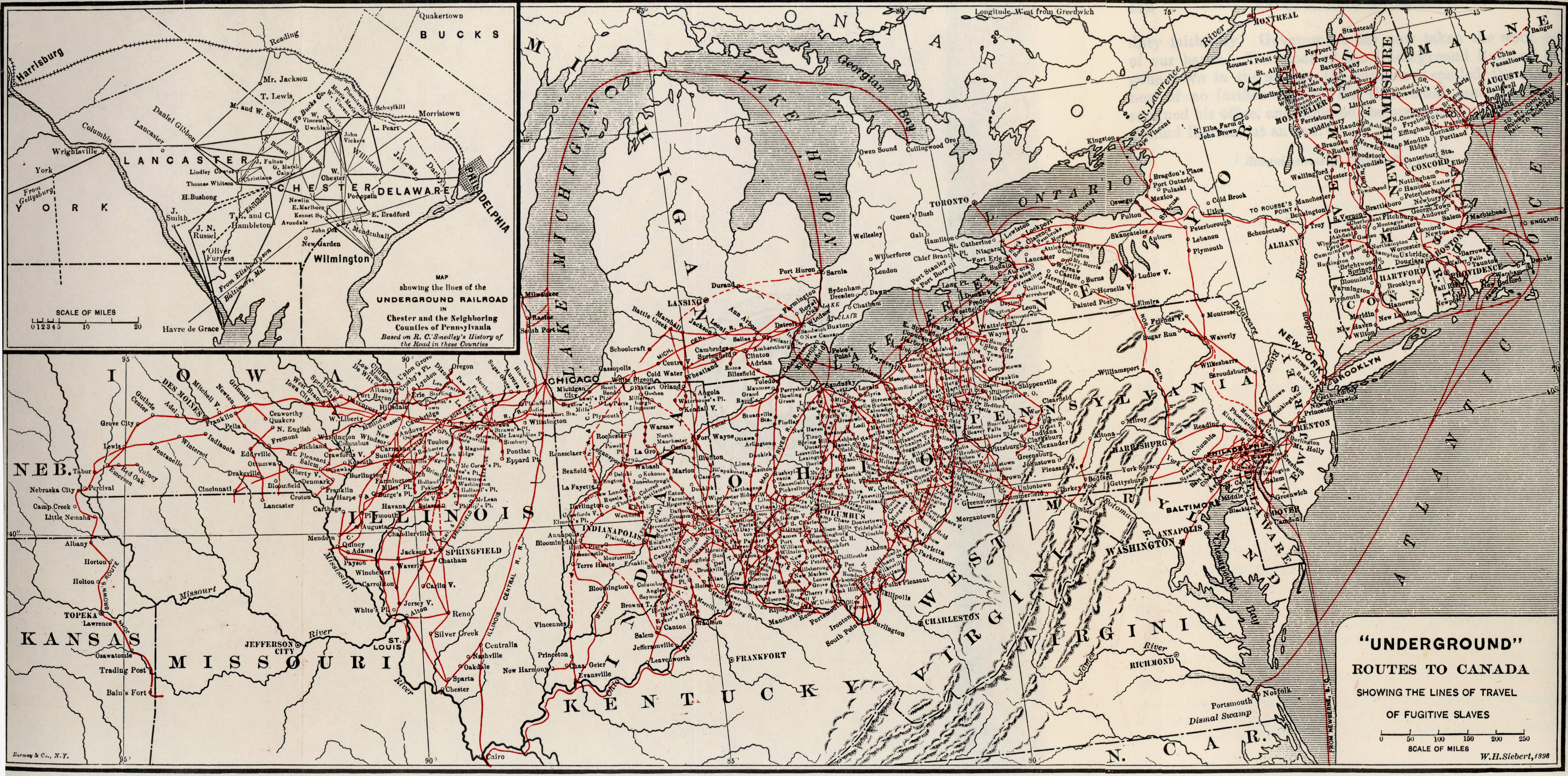
A map of various Underground Railroad routes

An ostensibly democratic idea, popular sovereignty stated that the inhabitants of each territory or state should decide whether it would be a free or slave state; however, this resulted in immigration en masse to Kansas by activists from both sides. At one point, Kansas had two separate governments, each with its own constitution, although only one was federally recognized. On January 29, 1861, Kansas was admitted to the Union as a free state, less than three months before the Battle of Fort Sumter officially began the Civil War.

On May 21, 1856, the Free Soil town of Lawrence, Kansas, was sacked by an armed pro-slavery force from Missouri. A few days later, the Sacking of Lawrence led abolitionist John Brown and six of his followers to execute five men along the Pottawatomie Creek in Franklin County, Kansas, in retaliation. The so-called "Border War" lasted from May through October between armed bands of pro-slavery and Free Soil men. The U.S. Army had two garrisons in Kansas, the First Cavalry Regiment at Fort Leavenworth and the Second Dragoons and Sixth Infantry at Fort Riley. The skirmishes endured until a new governor, John W. Geary, managed to prevail upon the Missourians to return home in late 1856.

National reaction to the events in Kansas demonstrated how deeply divided the country had become. The Border Ruffians were widely applauded in the South, even though their actions had cost the lives of numerous people. In the North, the murders committed by Brown and his followers were ignored by most, and lauded by a few. The election of Abraham Lincoln in November 1860 was the final trigger for secession by the Southern states.

The U.S. federal government was supported by 20 mostly-Northern free states in which slavery already had been abolished, and by five slave states that became known as the border states. All of the Midwestern states but one, Missouri, banned slavery. Though most battles were fought in the South, skirmishes between Kansas and Missouri continued until culmination with the Lawrence Massacre on August 21, 1863, in which Quantrill's Raiders raided and plundered Lawrence, killing more than 150 and burning all the business buildings and most of the dwellings.

=== Immigration and industrialization ===
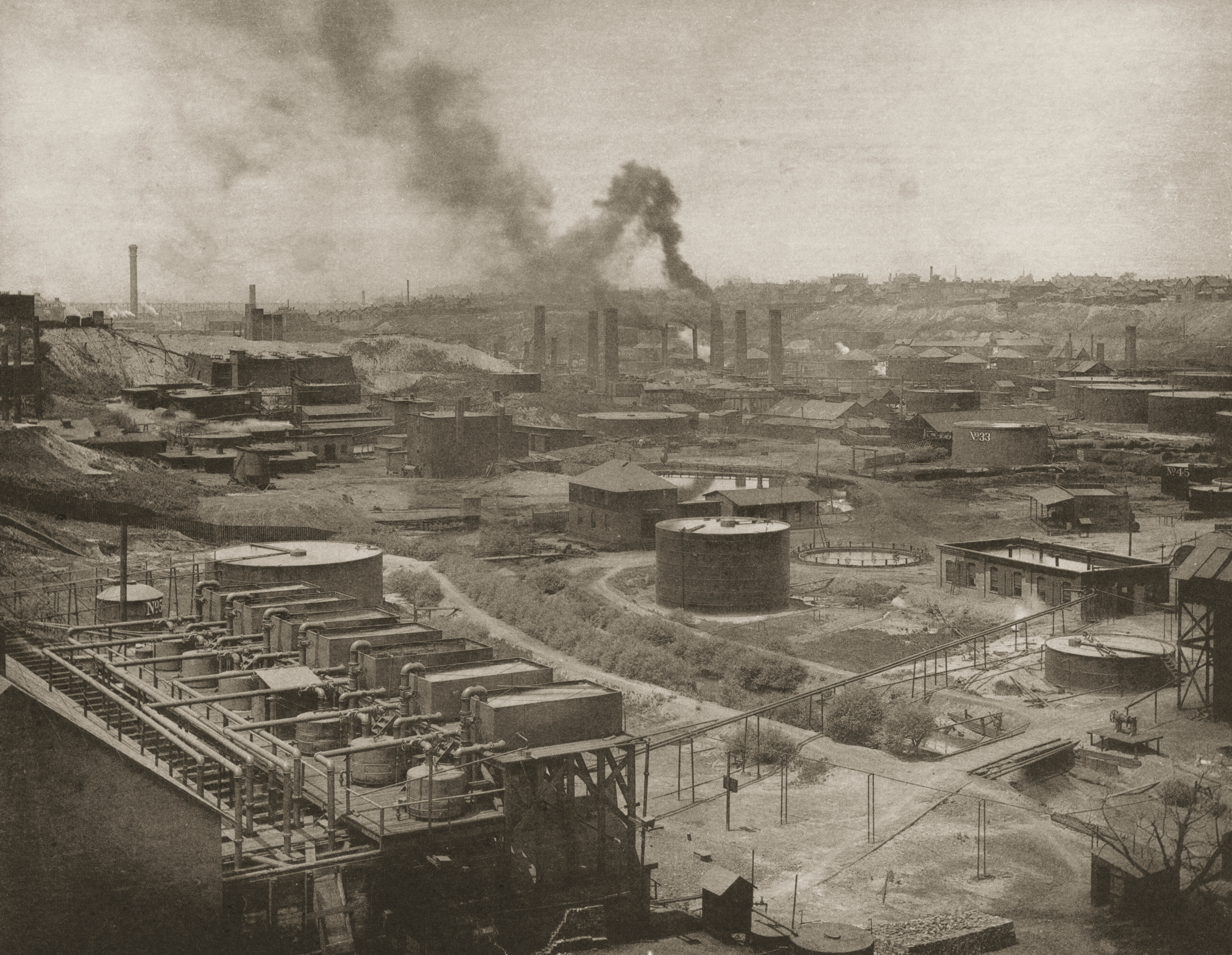
The first Standard Oil refinery was opened in Cleveland by businessman John D. Rockefeller.

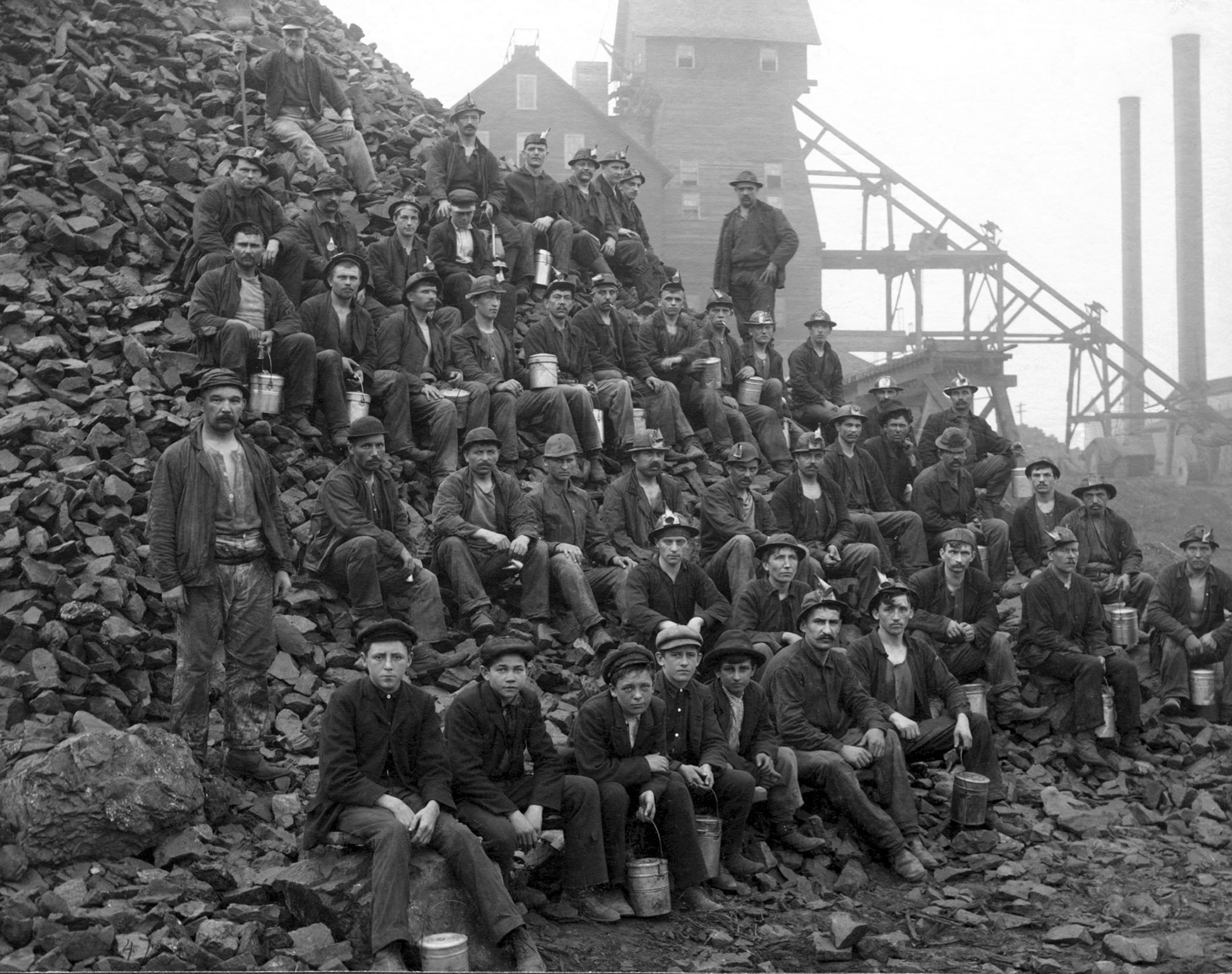
Miners at the Tamarack mine in Michigan's Copper Country, 1905

By the time of the American Civil War, European immigrants bypassed the East Coast of the United States to settle directly in the interior: German immigrants to Ohio, Wisconsin, Minnesota, Michigan, Indiana, Illinois, Iowa, Nebraska, Kansas, and Missouri; Irish immigrants to port cities on the Great Lakes, like Cleveland and Chicago; Danes, Czechs, Swedes, and Norwegians to Iowa, Nebraska, Wisconsin, Minnesota, and the Dakotas; and Finns to Upper Michigan and northern/central Minnesota and Wisconsin. Poles, Hungarians, and Jews settled in Midwestern cities.

The U.S. was predominantly rural at the time of the Civil War. The Midwest was no exception, dotted with small farms all across the region. The late 19th century saw industrialization, immigration, and urbanization that fed the Industrial Revolution, and the heart of industrial domination and innovation was in the Great Lakes states of the Midwest, which only began its slow decline by the late 20th century.

A flourishing economy brought residents from rural communities and immigrants from abroad. Manufacturing and retail and finance sectors became dominant, influencing the American economy.

In addition to manufacturing, printing, publishing, and food processing also play major roles in the Midwest's largest economy. Chicago was the base of commercial operations for industrialists John Crerar, John Whitfield Bunn, Richard Teller Crane, Marshall Field, John Farwell, Julius Rosenwald, and many other commercial visionaries who laid the foundation for Midwestern and global industry. Meanwhile, John D. Rockefeller, creator of the Standard Oil Company, made his billions in Cleveland. At one point during the late 19th century, Cleveland was home to more than 50% of the world's millionaires, many living on the famous Millionaire's Row on Euclid Avenue.

In the 20th century, African American migration from the Southern United States into the Midwestern states changed Chicago, St. Louis, Cleveland, Milwaukee, Kansas City, Cincinnati, Detroit, Omaha, Minneapolis, and many other cities in the Midwest, as factories and schools enticed families by the thousands to new opportunities. Chicago alone gained hundreds of thousands of black citizens from the Great Migration and the Second Great Migration.

The Gateway Arch monument in St. Louis, clad in stainless steel and built in the form of a flattened catenary arch, is the tallest man-made monument in the United States, and the world's tallest arch. Built as a monument to the westward expansion of the United States, it is the centerpiece of the Gateway Arch National Park, which was known as the Jefferson National Expansion Memorial until 2018, and has become an internationally famous symbol of St. Louis and the Midwest.

==== German Americans ====
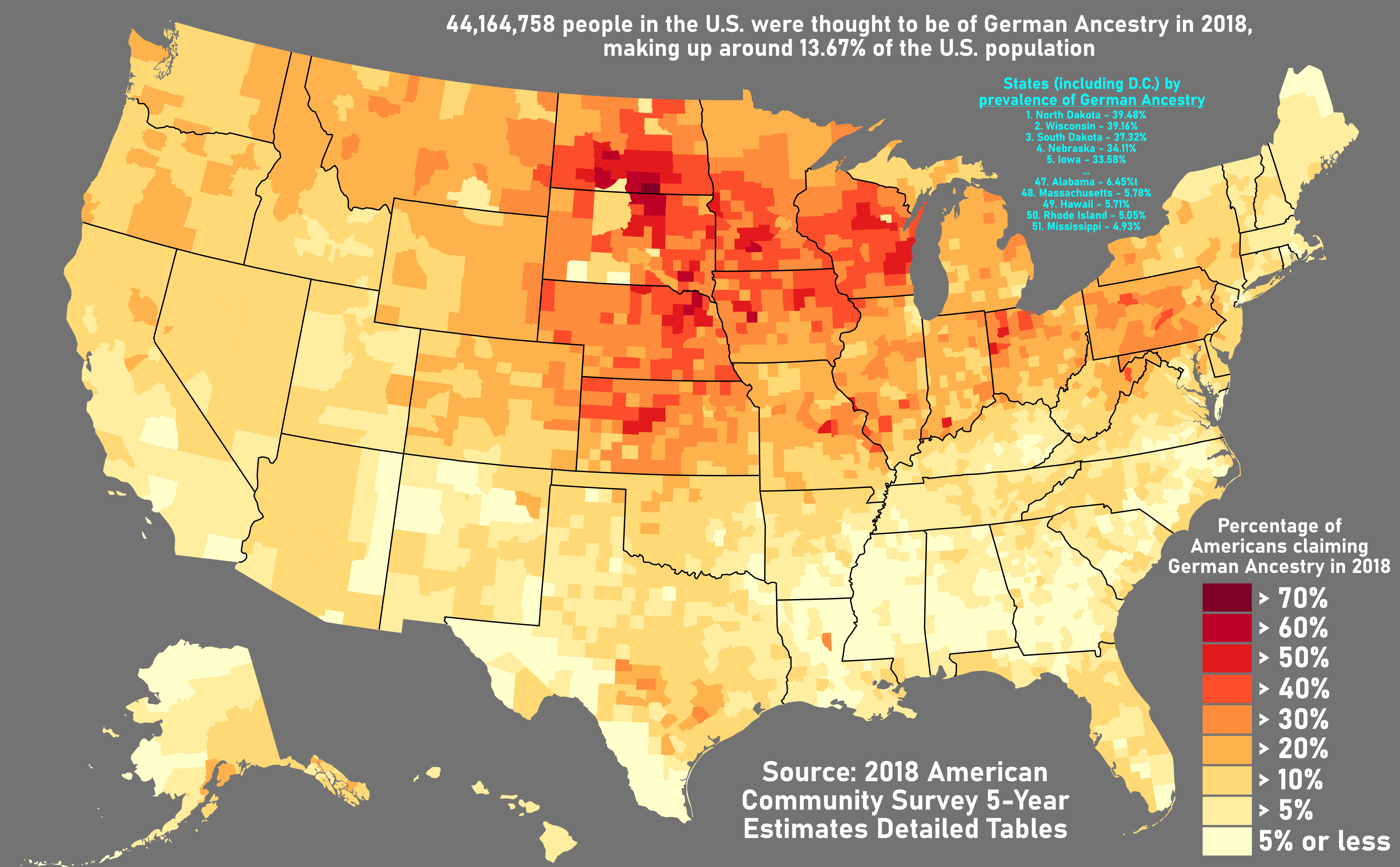
Distribution of Americans claiming German Ancestry by county in 2018

As the Midwest opened up to settlement via waterways and rail in the mid-1800s, Germans began to settle there in large numbers. The largest flow of German immigration to America occurred between 1820 and World War I, during which time nearly six million Germans immigrated to the United States. From 1840 to 1880, they were the largest group of immigrants.

The Midwestern cities of Milwaukee, Cincinnati, St. Louis, and Chicago were favored destinations of German immigrants. By 1900, the populations of the cities of Cleveland, Milwaukee, Hoboken, and Cincinnati were all more than 40 percent German American. Dubuque and Davenport, Iowa, had even larger proportions; in Omaha, Nebraska, the proportion of German Americans was 57 percent in 1910. In many other cities of the Midwest, such as Fort Wayne, Indiana, German Americans were at least 30 percent of the population. Many concentrations acquired distinctive names suggesting their heritage, such as the "Over-the-Rhine" district in Cincinnati and "German Village" in Columbus, Ohio.

A favorite destination was Milwaukee, known as "the German Athens". Radical Germans trained in politics in the old country dominated the city's Socialists. Skilled workers dominated many crafts, while entrepreneurs created the brewing industry; the most famous brands included Pabst, Schlitz, Miller, and Blatz.

While half of German immigrants settled in cities, the other half established farms in the Midwest. From Ohio to the Plains states, a heavy presence persists in rural areas into the 21st century.

Throughout the 19th and 20th centuries, German Americans showed a high interest in becoming farmers, and keeping their children and grandchildren on the land. Western railroads, with large land grants available to attract farmers, set up agencies in Hamburg and other German cities, promising cheap transportation, and sales of farmland on easy terms. For example, the Santa Fe Railroad hired its own commissioner for immigration, and sold over 300,000 acres (1,200 km^{2}) to German-speaking farmers.

=== Politics 1860s–1920s ===
The Midwest was a battleground for political and economic issues after the Civil War, with voters splitting along ethnic and religious lines rather than class. The temperance, Greenback, and populist movements gained attention in the region, with pietists supporting the Republicans and ritualists backing the Democrats. Prohibition was a major issue in the Midwest, with both the Women's Christian Temperance Union and the Anti-Saloon League originating in the region. The 18th Amendment was ratified by most Midwestern state legislatures, but the Midwest also became a center of resistance to Prohibition, with ethnic, urban Catholic and German Lutheran voters supporting repeal while native-born, rural pietistic Protestant Midwesterners opposed it.

==== Women ====
The presence of women in the Midwest public stage in the late 19th and early 20th centuries aligned with the growing movements for women's rights and prohibition. Women's activism was often presented as an extension of their domestic cleaning role. Activists at the local and state level used the Woman's Christian Temperance Union's crusade against alcohol, as a way to push for the right to vote. Midwestern states began allowing women to vote before the 19th Amendment was passed, and the leader of the campaign for the suffrage amendment was Carrie Chapman Catt from Iowa. The 1970s feminist movement also had Midwestern roots, with Betty Friedan from Illinois writing The Feminine Mystique in 1963. Economic necessity and the desire for a career also drove women to work outside the home, and certain occupations such as teaching and nursing became feminized.

==== Workers and populists ====
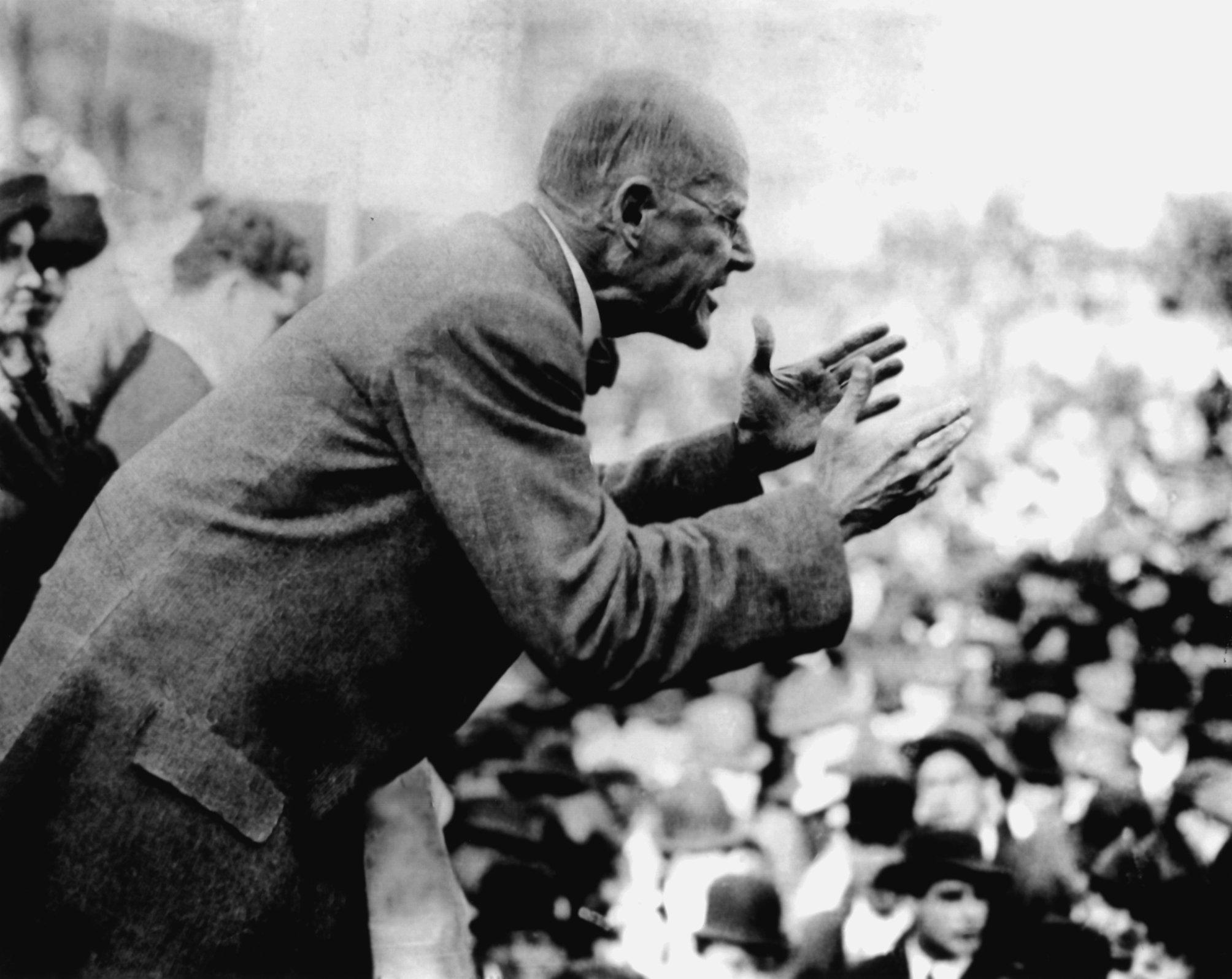
Eugene V. Debs speaking in Canton, Ohio, in 1918, being arrested for sedition shortly thereafter

The Midwest saw labor unrest and rebellion against the capitalist economic order. Chicago played a large role in the Great Railroad Strike of 1877. Later, in 1886, labor leaders organized a protest meeting at Haymarket Square in Chicago in 1886, where a bomb was thrown among police and eight anarchists were convicted of conspiracy for murder, an event known as the Haymarket affair. The Pullman Strike of 1894 was a shutdown of most rail traffic in the Midwest and West. It turned violent and was broken by federal troops. Eugene V. Debs, leader of the striking American Railway Union, went to prison where he converted to Socialism. His version of socialism appealed to some immigrant groups but was too radical for most Midwesterners.

Farmers distrusted big business and adopted cooperative arrangements, such as those offered by the Grange in the 1870s or the Farmers' Alliance in the 1890s. They wanted cooperatives controlled by farmers to handle farm products, a reduction in rail freight rates, and the coining of silver money to raise prices. The Alliance turned to political action with the creation of the Populist Party in 1892. It had local success in the wheat belt and silver mining areas. This venture as a third party was short-lived and they fused with the Democrats in 1896 and voted for Democrat William Jennings Bryan. Leftwing rural politics continued in the 20th century in the Dakotas and Minnesota with the Farmer–Labor Party

=== 1920s ===
The second Ku Klux Klan experienced a short surge in the Midwest in the early 1920s, fueled by anti-immigrant and anti-Catholic bigotry. The KKK in the 1920s was a local membership organization, but its autonomous local chapters were uncoordinated, and it had little impact on state legislation. Members wanted enforcement of vice laws, especially Prohibition, which many immigrants violated. The Klan reached its peak of visibility in Indiana, where the governor supposedly had connections to the secret group. However, the hundreds of Indiana Klan chapters collapsed overnight due to a scandal implicating the state leader in the abduction and murder of a young woman. The Klan represented a conformist impulse. Middletown (actually the city of Muncie, Indiana) was the base for a pioneering sociological study conducted by Robert S. Lynd. The book revealed a powerful business class that promoted civic boosterism, patriotism, and straight-ticket voting, while discouraging political activism and dissent.

==== Progressive Era ====
The negative effects of industrialization triggered the political movement of progressivism, which aimed to address its negative consequences through social reform and government regulation. Jane Addams and Ellen Gates Starr pioneered the settlement house outreach to newly arrived immigrants by establishing Hull House in Chicago in 1889. Settlement houses provided social services and played an active role in civic life, helping immigrants prepare for naturalization and campaigning for regulation and services from city government. Midwestern mayors—especially Hazen S. Pingree and Tom L. Johnson, led early reforms against boss-dominated municipal politics, while Samuel M. Jones advocated public ownership of local utilities. Robert M. La Follette, the most famous leader of Midwestern progressivism, began his career by winning election against his state's Republican party in 1900. The machine was temporarily defeated, allowing reformers to launch the "Wisconsin idea" of expanded democracy. This idea included major reforms such as direct primaries, campaign finance controls, civil service to replace patronage, restrictions on lobbyists, state income and inheritance taxes, child labor restrictions, pure food, and workmen's compensation laws. La Follette promoted government regulation of railroads, public utilities, factories, and banks. Although La Follette lost influence in the national party in 1912, the Wisconsin reforms became a model for progressivism in other states.

== Geography ==
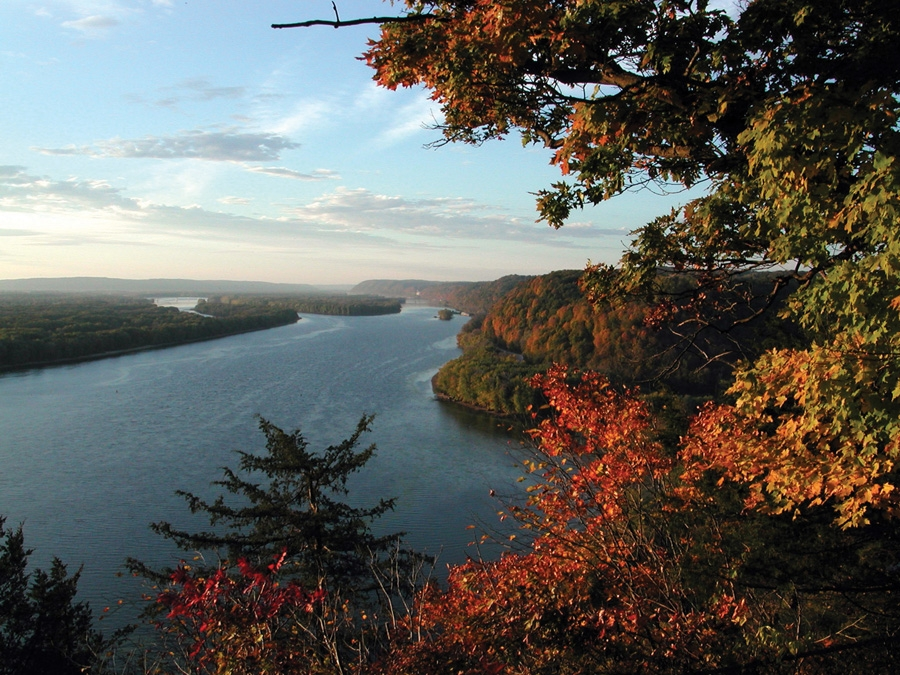
The Upper Mississippi River viewed from Effigy Mounds National Monument, Iowa

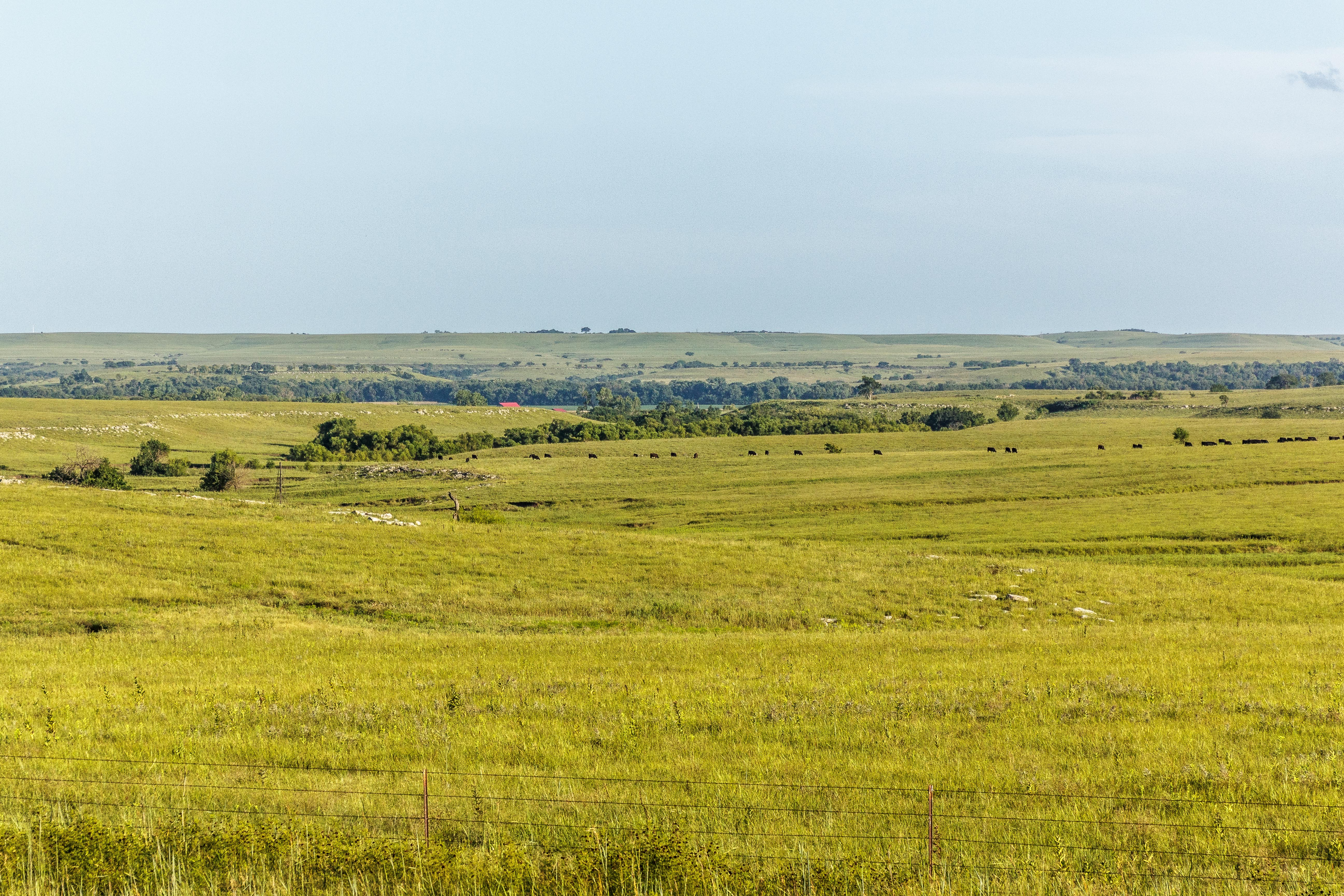
Flint Hills grasslands of Kansas

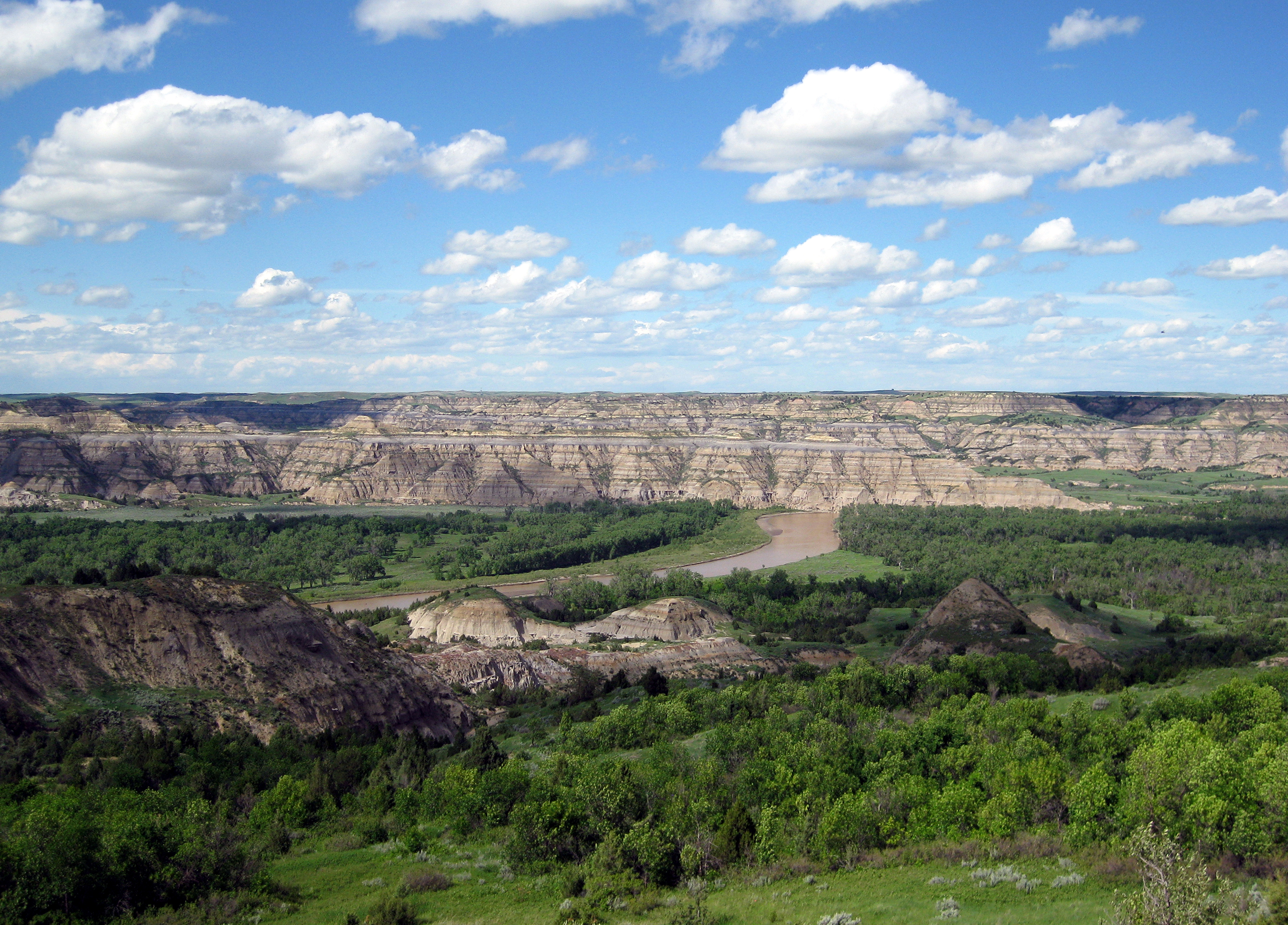
Badlands of Theodore Roosevelt National Park, North Dakota

Apostle Islands National Lakeshore, Wisconsin

According to Brian Page and Richard Walker: The sequence of settlement that helped define the subregions of the Midwest was roughly as follows:

1800-20, from Pittsburgh down the Ohio Valley to St. Louis at the junction of the Missouri and Mississippi Rivers;
1820-40, the southern Great Lakes shores, from northern Ohio to Milwaukee;
1840-60, infill of the Prairie heartland across to eastern Iowa and southern Minnesota;
post-Civil War, the penetration of the northern woodlands and eastern plains from the central Midwest.

The vast central area of the U.S., into Canada, is a landscape of low, flat to rolling terrain in the Interior Plains, ideal for farming and growing food. Most of its eastern two-thirds form the Interior Lowlands. The Lowlands gradually rise westward, from a line passing through eastern Kansas, up to over 5,000 feet (1,500 m) in the unit known as the Great Plains. Most of the Great Plains area is now farmed.

While these states are for the most part relatively flat, consisting either of plains or of rolling and small hills, there is a measure of geographical variation. In particular, the following areas exhibit a high degree of topographical variety: the eastern Midwest near the foothills of the Appalachian Mountains; the Great Lakes Basin; the heavily glaciated uplands of the North Shore of Lake Superior in Minnesota, part of the ruggedly volcanic Canadian Shield; the Ozark Mountains of southern Missouri; and the deeply eroded Driftless Area of southwest Wisconsin, southeast Minnesota, northeast Iowa, and northwest Illinois.

Proceeding westward, the Appalachian Plateau topography gradually gives way to gently rolling hills, and then (in central Ohio) to flat lands converted principally to farms and urban areas. This is the beginning of the vast Interior Plains of North America. As a result, prairies cover most of the Great Plains states. Iowa and much of Illinois lie within an area called the prairie peninsula, an eastward extension of prairies that borders conifer and mixed forests to the north, and hardwood deciduous forests to the east and south.

Geographers subdivide the Interior Plains into the Interior Lowlands and the Great Plains on the basis of elevation. The Lowlands are mostly below 1,500 feet (460 m) above sea level whereas the Great Plains to the west are higher, rising in Colorado to around 5,000 feet (1,500 m). The Lowlands, then, are confined to parts of Iowa, Illinois, Indiana, Ohio, Michigan, Tennessee, and Kentucky. Missouri and Arkansas have regions of Lowlands elevations, contrasting with their Ozark region (within the Interior Highlands). Eastern Ohio's hills are an extension of the Appalachian Plateau.

The Interior Plains are largely coincident with the vast Mississippi River Drainage System (other major components are the Missouri and Ohio Rivers). These rivers have for tens of millions of years been eroding downward into the mostly horizontal sedimentary rocks of Paleozoic, Mesozoic, and Cenozoic ages. The modern Mississippi River system has developed during the Pleistocene Epoch of the Cenozoic.

Rainfall decreases from east to west, resulting in different types of prairies, with the tallgrass prairie in the wetter eastern region, mixed-grass prairie in the central Great Plains, and shortgrass prairie towards the rain shadow of the Rockies. Today, these three prairie types largely correspond to the corn/soybean area, the wheat belt, and the western rangelands, respectively.

Much of the coniferous forests of the Upper Midwest were clear-cut in the late 19th century, and mixed hardwood forests have become a major component of the new woodlands since then. The majority of the Midwest can now be categorized as urbanized areas or pastoral agricultural areas.

=== Definitions ===
Divisions of the Midwest by the U.S. Census Bureau into East North Central and West North Central, separated largely by the Mississippi River

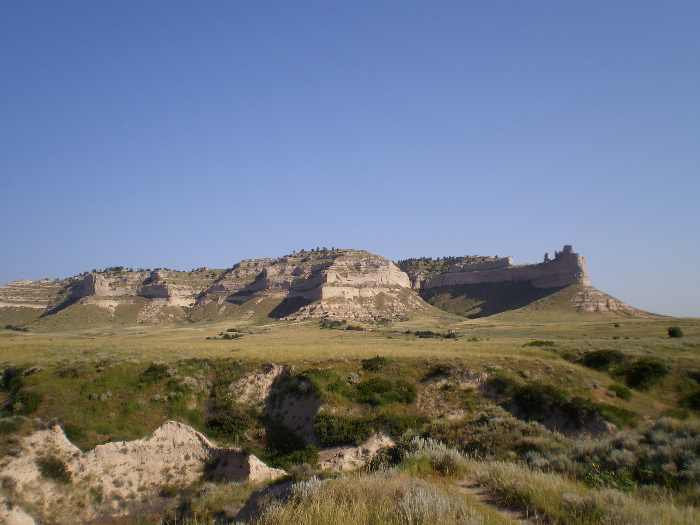
Scotts Bluff National Monument in western Nebraska

The first recorded use of the term Midwestern to refer to a region of the central U.S. occurred in 1886; Midwest appeared in 1894, and Midwesterner in 1916. One of the earliest late-19th-century uses of Midwest was in reference to Kansas and Nebraska to indicate that they were the civilized areas of the west. The term Midwestern has been in use since the 1880s to refer to portions of the central United States. A variant term, Middle West, has been used since the 19th century and remains relatively common.

Traditional definitions of the Midwest include the Northwest Ordinance Old Northwest states and many states that were part of the Louisiana Purchase. The states of the Old Northwest are also known as Great Lakes states and are east-north central in the United States. The Ohio River runs along the southeastern section, and the Mississippi River runs north to south near the center. Many of the Louisiana Purchase states in the west-north central United States are also known as the Great Plains states, and the Missouri River is a major waterway joining with the Mississippi. The Midwest lies north of the 36°30′ parallel, which the 1820 Missouri Compromise established as the dividing line between future slave and non-slave states.

The Midwest Region is defined by the U.S. Census Bureau as these 12 states:

- Illinois: Old Northwest, Mississippi River (Missouri River joins near the state border), Ohio River, and Great Lakes state
- Indiana: Old Northwest, Ohio River, and Great Lakes state
- Iowa: Louisiana Purchase, Mississippi River, and Missouri River state
- Kansas: Louisiana Purchase, Great Plains, and Missouri River state
- Michigan: Old Northwest and Great Lakes state
- Minnesota: Old Northwest, Louisiana Purchase, Mississippi River, part of Red River Colony before 1818, Great Lakes state
- Missouri: Louisiana Purchase, Mississippi River (Ohio River joins near the state border), Missouri River, and border state
- Nebraska: Louisiana Purchase, Great Plains, and Missouri River state
- North Dakota: Louisiana Purchase, part of Red River Colony before 1818, Great Plains, and Missouri River state
- Ohio: Old Northwest (Historic Connecticut Western Reserve), Ohio River, and Great Lakes state. The southeastern part of the state is part of northern Appalachia
- South Dakota: Louisiana Purchase, Great Plains, and Missouri River state
- Wisconsin: Old Northwest, Mississippi River, and Great Lakes state

Various organizations define the Midwest with slightly different groups of states. For example, the Council of State Governments, an organization for communication and coordination among state governments, includes in its Midwest regional office eleven states from the above list, omitting Missouri, which is in the CSG South region. The Midwest Region of the National Park Service consists of these twelve states plus the state of Arkansas. The Midwest Archives Conference, a professional archives organization, covers the above twelve states, plus Kentucky. A 2023 Emerson College/Middle West Review poll includes the above twelve states, plus Oklahoma and Wyoming.

State	2020 census	2010 census	Change	Area	Density
Iowa	3,190,369	3,046,355	+4.73%	55,857.09 sq mi (144,669.2 km^{2})	57/sq mi (22/km^{2})
Kansas	2,937,880	2,853,118	+2.97%	81,758.65 sq mi (211,753.9 km^{2})	36/sq mi (14/km^{2})
Missouri	6,154,913	5,988,927	+2.77%	68,741.47 sq mi (178,039.6 km^{2})	90/sq mi (35/km^{2})
Nebraska	1,961,504	1,826,341	+7.40%	76,824.11 sq mi (198,973.5 km^{2})	26/sq mi (10/km^{2})
North Dakota	779,094	672,591	+15.83%	69,000.74 sq mi (178,711.1 km^{2})	11/sq mi (4/km^{2})
South Dakota	886,667	814,180	+8.90%	75,810.94 sq mi (196,349.4 km^{2})	12/sq mi (5/km^{2})
Great Plains	15,910,427	15,201,512	+4.66%	427,993.00 sq mi (1,108,496.8 km^{2})	37/sq mi (14/km^{2})
Illinois	12,812,508	12,830,632	−0.14%	55,518.89 sq mi (143,793.3 km^{2})	231/sq mi (89/km^{2})
Indiana	6,785,528	6,483,802	+4.65%	35,826.08 sq mi (92,789.1 km^{2})	189/sq mi (73/km^{2})
Michigan	10,077,331	9,883,640	+1.96%	56,538.86 sq mi (146,435.0 km^{2})	178/sq mi (69/km^{2})
Minnesota	5,706,494	5,303,925	+7.59%	79,626.68 sq mi (206,232.2 km^{2})	72/sq mi (28/km^{2})
Ohio	11,799,448	11,536,504	+2.28%	40,860.66 sq mi (105,828.6 km^{2})	289/sq mi (111/km^{2})
Wisconsin	5,893,718	5,686,986	+3.64%	54,157.76 sq mi (140,268.0 km^{2})	109/sq mi (42/km^{2})
Great Lakes	53,085,258	51,725,489	+2.63%	322,528.93 sq mi (835,346.1 km^{2})	165/sq mi (64/km^{2})
Total	68,995,685	66,927,001	+3.09%	750,521.93 sq mi (1,943,842.9 km^{2})	92/sq mi (35/km^{2})

=== Major metropolitan areas ===
Metropolitan Statistical Areas (MSA) ranked by population size
Rank (Midwest)	Rank (USA)	MSA	State(s)	Population
1	3	Chicago	Illinois; Indiana; Wisconsin	9,449,351
2	14	Detroit	Michigan	4,392,041
3	16	Twin Cities (Minneapolis–Saint Paul)	Minnesota; Wisconsin	3,690,261
4	21	St. Louis	Missouri; Illinois	2,820,253
5	30	Cincinnati	Ohio; Kentucky; Indiana	2,249,797
6	31	Kansas City	Missouri; Kansas	2,192,035
7	32	Cleveland	Ohio	2,185,825
8	33	Columbus	Ohio	2,138,926
9	34	Indianapolis	Indiana	2,089,653
10	40	Milwaukee	Wisconsin	1,574,731
11	51	Grand Rapids	Michigan	1,150,015
12	57	Omaha	Nebraska; Iowa	967,604
13	74	Dayton	Ohio	814,049
14	81	Des Moines	Iowa	709,466
15	85	Akron	Ohio	702,219
16	87	Madison	Wisconsin	680,796
17	90	Wichita	Kansas	647,610
18	96	Toledo	Ohio	606,240

== Demographics ==
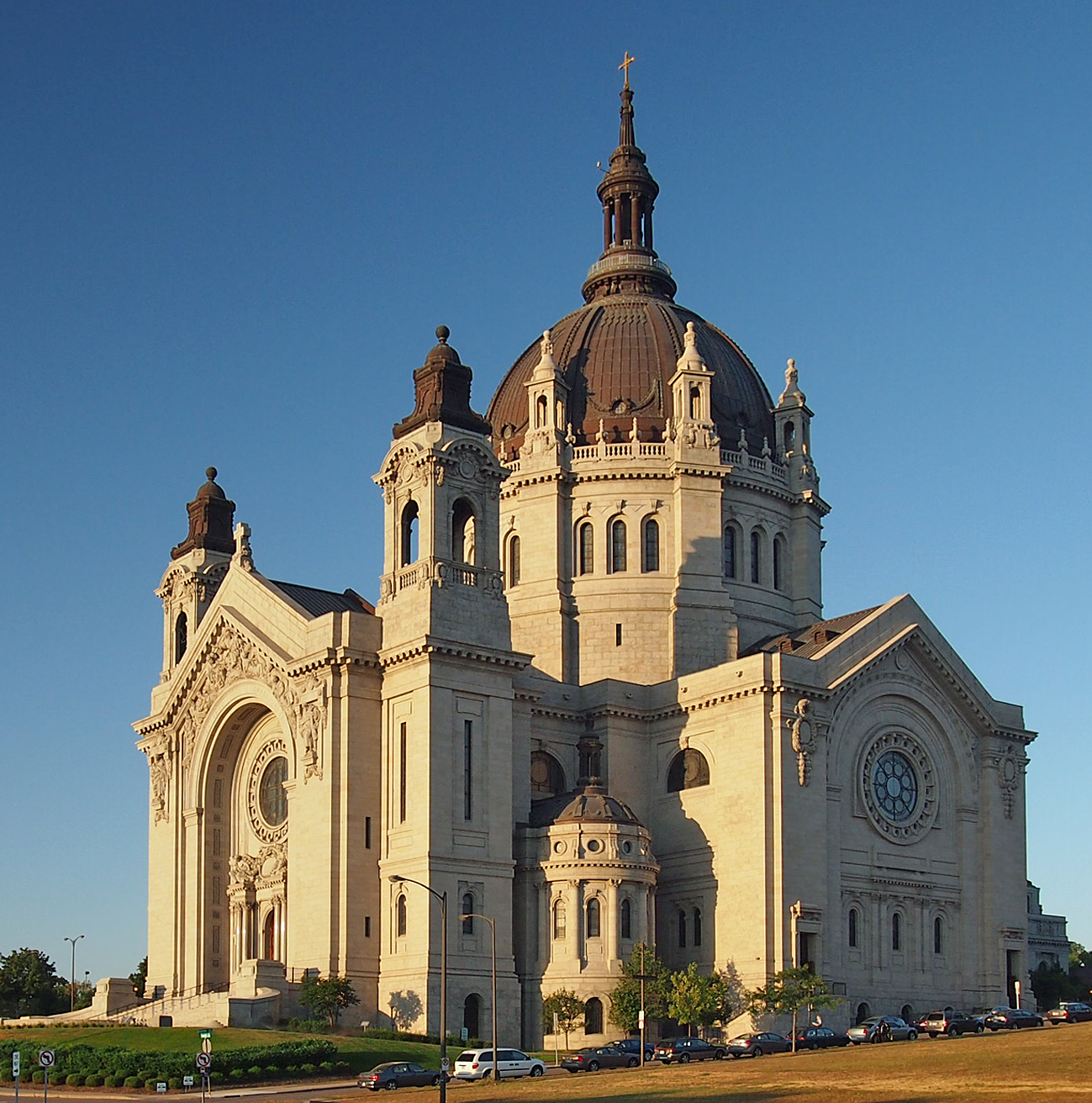
Cathedral of Saint Paul, Minnesota

Race (2022)	Population	Share of population
White (Non-Hispanic)	50,186,628	73.0%
Black (Non-Hispanic)	6,797,609	9.9%
Asian (Non-Hispanic)	2,383,156	3.5%
Native American (Non-Hispanic)	268,845	0.4%
Pacific Islander (Non-Hispanic)	41,630	0.1%
Multiracial (Non-Hispanic)	2,901,606	4.2%
Some other race (Non-Hispanic)	293,288	0.4%
Hispanic or Latino (Of any race)	5,914,837	8.6%
Total	68,787,600	100.0%

Historical Racial Composition of the Midwest (1890-1960)
Racial composition	1890	1900	1910	1920	1930	1940	1950	1960
White	97.8%	97.9%	98.0%	97.5%	96.5%	96.3%	94.7%	93.0%
Black	1.9%	1.9%	1.8%	2.3%	3.3%	3.5%	5.0%	6.7%
Asian	0.0%	0.0%	0.0%	0.0%	0.0%	0.0%	0.1%	0.1%
Native American	0.3%	0.2%	0.2%	0.2%	0.2%	0.2%	0.2%	0.2%

Historical Ethnic/Racial Composition of the Midwest (1970-2020)
Racial/Ethnic composition	1970	1980	1990	2000	2010	2020
White (Non-Hispanic)	89.6%	87.5%	85.8%	81.4%	77.8%	72.6%
Black (Non-Hispanic	7.9%	9.0%	9.5%	9.9%	10.2%	10.3%
Asian (Non-Hispanic)	0.2%	0.6%	1.3%	1.8%	2.6%	3.5%
Native American (Non-Hispanic)	0.3%	0.4%	0.5%	0.6%	0.6%	0.6%
'Some other race' (Non-Hispanic)	0.2%	0.3%	0.1%	0.1%	0.1%	0.4%
Two or more races (Non-Hispanic)	—	—	—	1.4%	1.7%	4.0%
Hispanic or Latino (Any race)	1.9%	2.2%	2.9%	4.8%	7.0%	8.7%

According to the 2022 American Community Survey, 22.6% of the Midwest's population report German ancestry, 10.6% report Irish ancestry, 9.4% report English ancestry, 5.9% report Mexican ancestry, 4.8% identify their ancestry as American, 4.3% report Polish ancestry, and 2.6% report Norwegian ancestry. The Midwest is home to the largest concentration of German-Americans within the US, with this group making up over 30% of the population in North Dakota, South Dakota, Wisconsin, Iowa, and Nebraska. In addition to German-Americans, the upper Midwest is home to a large population of Scandinavian Americans. In Minnesota, 11.8% of the population identifies with Norwegian ancestry, while 6.4% report Swedish ancestry. In North Dakota, 22% of the population reports Norwegian ancestry, the highest rate in the country.

While the Midwest historically had a very small Black population, this changed in the early 20th century as numerous African Americans left the South for major urban areas in the North and West, fleeing racial persecution and seeking new economic opportunities in a population movement known as the Great Migration. This drastically changed the demographics of many Midwestern cities that had previously been almost entirely populated by White Americans, leading to segregation and discrimination against the growing Black population, racial violence, and "white flight" to suburban areas. From 1910 to 1970, Black Americans increased from 2% of Chicago's population to 33%, and became almost half of the population in Detroit. As a result of the Great Migration, Black Americans currently make up 10% of the Midwest's population, with over 96% being concentrated in urban areas, including major cities like Chicago, Detroit, Cleveland, and Milwaukee, as well as medium-sized cities like Gary and Flint. At the same time, most of the rural Midwest has remained overwhelmingly White, with almost two-thirds of the 1,055 counties in the Midwest being over 95% White.

Illinois is the most populous and racially diverse state in the Midwest, and out of all 50 states, it is also ranked as the most representative of the overall demographics of the United States on several metrics, including religion, race/ethnicity, and urban/rural divide. Almost half of the Hispanic population in the Midwest resides in Illinois, mostly in the Chicago metro area.

As of 2022, the median household income in the Midwest is $70,283, slightly lower than the national average of $74,755. 12.2% of the region's population lives below the poverty line, including roughly 16% of children under 18, and 10% of seniors over 65. The average household size in the Midwest is 2.4 people

As of 2022, the median age in the Midwest is 39.2 years, with 22% of the population being under 18, and 18% being over 65. The age distribution in the Midwest broadly matches the US as a whole. In terms of sex, 50.3% of the region's population are female, and 49.7% are male. Half of the population over the age of 15 are married, while half are unmarried

=== Religion ===
Like the rest of the United States, the Midwest is predominantly Christian.

The majority of Midwesterners are Protestants, with rates from 48 percent in Illinois to 63 percent in Iowa. However, the Catholic Church is the single largest denomination, varying between 18 percent and 34 percent of the state populations. Lutherans are prevalent in the Upper Midwest, especially in Michigan, Minnesota, the Dakotas, and Wisconsin with their large German and Scandinavian populations. Southern Baptists compose about 15 percent of Missouri's population, but much smaller percentages in other Midwestern states.

Judaism and Islam are collectively practiced by 2 percent of the population, with higher concentrations in major urban areas. 35 percent of Midwesterners attend religious services every week, and 69 percent attend at least a few times a year. People with no religious affiliation make up 22 percent of the Midwest's population.

=== Vital statistics ===
Year	Population	Live births	Deaths	Natural change	Crude birth rate (per 1,000)	Crude death rate (per 1,000)	Natural change (per 1,000)	Crude migration change (per 1,000)
2000	64,491,431	898,370	576,843	321,527	13.9	8.9	5.0	
2001	64,776,531	887,038	575,007	312,031	13.7	8.9	4.8	-0.4
2002	65,018,293	877,035	582,582	294,453	13.5	9.0	4.5	-0.8
2003	65,276,954	889,403	577,852	311,551	13.6	8.9	4.7	-0.8
2004	65,532,305	889,151	562,728	326,423	13.6	8.6	5.0	-1.1
2005	65,751,872	888,024	574,733	313,291	13.5	8.7	4.8	-1.4
2006	66,028,555	903,371	568,288	335,083	13.7	8.6	5.1	-0.9
2007	66,293,689	906,214	564,665	341,549	13.7	8.5	5.2	-1.2
2008	66,523,935	891,185	582,258	308,927	13.4	8.8	4.6	-1.2
2009	66,748,437	869,333	566,666	302,667	13.0	8.5	4.5	-1.2
2010	66,990,957	842,856	575,429	267,427	12.6	8.6	4.0	-0.4
2011	67,242,411	834,224	587,176	247,048	12.4	8.7	3.7	0.1
2012	67,489,449	832,669	591,222	241,447	12.3	8.8	3.5	0.1
2013	67,780,382	830,437	601,688	228,749	12.3	8.9	3.4	0.9
2014	68,032,120	838,249	609,364	228,885	12.3	8.9	3.4	0.3
2015	68,214,912	835,633	623,806	211,827	12.3	9.1	3.2	-0.4
2016	68,410,263	827,708	627,149	200,559	12.1	9.2	2.9	-0.1
2017	68,615,113	810,063	644,378	165,685	11.8	9.4	2.4	0.6
2018	68,780,477	798,401	649,652	148,749	11.6	9.4	2.2	0.2
2019	68,920,237	784,460	650,493	133,967	11.4	9.4	2.0	0.1
2020	68,979,566	754,301	766,131	-11,830	10.9	11.1	-0.2	1.0
2021	68,867,096	760,195	756,862	3,333	11.0	11.0	0.0	-1.7
2022	68,872,112	747,620	730,898	16,722	10.9	10.6	0.3	-0.2
2023	69,132,050	733,508	683,517	49,991	10.6	9.9	0.7	3.0
2024	69,518,281	738,392	680,466	57,926	10.6	9.8	0.8	4.7
2025	69,762,666							

== Economy ==
=== Farming and agriculture ===
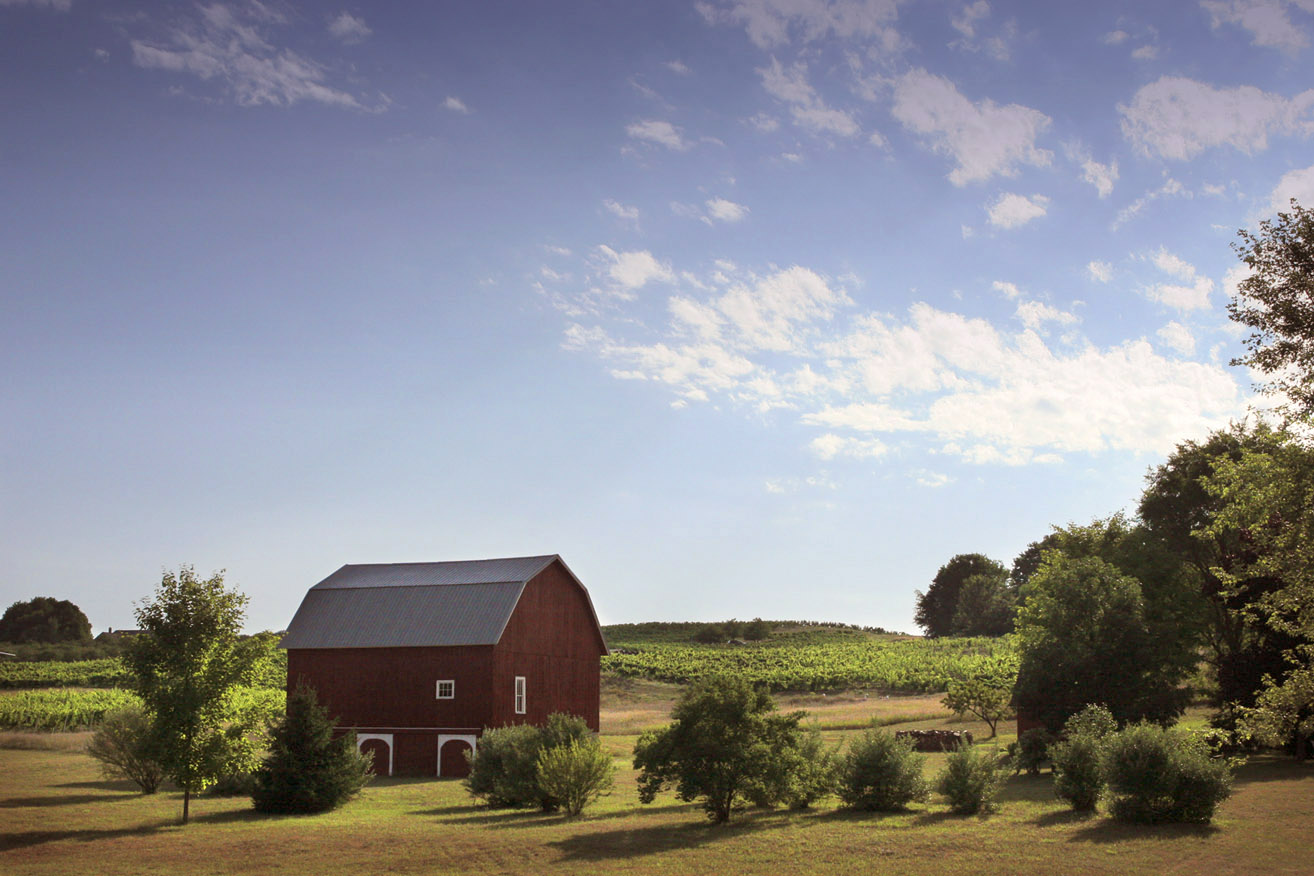
A pastoral farm scene near Traverse City, Michigan, with a classic American red barn

Agriculture is one of the biggest drivers of local economies in the Midwest, accounting for billions of dollars' worth of exports and thousands of jobs. The area consists of some of the richest farming land in the world. The region's fertile soil combined with the steel plow has made it possible for farmers to produce abundant harvests of grain and cereal crops, including corn, wheat, soybeans, oats, and barley, to become known today as the nation's "breadbasket". Henry A. Wallace, a pioneer of hybrid seeds, declared in 1956 that the Corn Belt developed the "most productive agricultural civilization the world has ever seen". Today, the U.S. produces 40 percent of the world crop.

The very dense soil of the Midwest plagued the first settlers who were using wooden plows, which were more suitable for loose forest soil. On the prairie, the plows bounced around and the soil stuck to them. This problem was solved in 1837 by an Illinois blacksmith named John Deere who developed a steel moldboard plow that was stronger and cut the roots, making the fertile soils of the prairie ready for farming. Farms spread from the colonies westward along with the settlers. In cooler regions, wheat was often the crop of choice when lands were newly settled, leading to a "wheat frontier" that moved westward over the course of years. Also very common in the antebellum Midwest was farming corn while raising hogs, complementing each other especially since it was difficult to get grain to market before the canals and railroads. After the "wheat frontier" had passed through an area, more diversified farms including dairy and beef cattle generally took its place. The introduction and broad adoption of scientific agriculture since the mid-19th century contributed to economic growth in the United States.

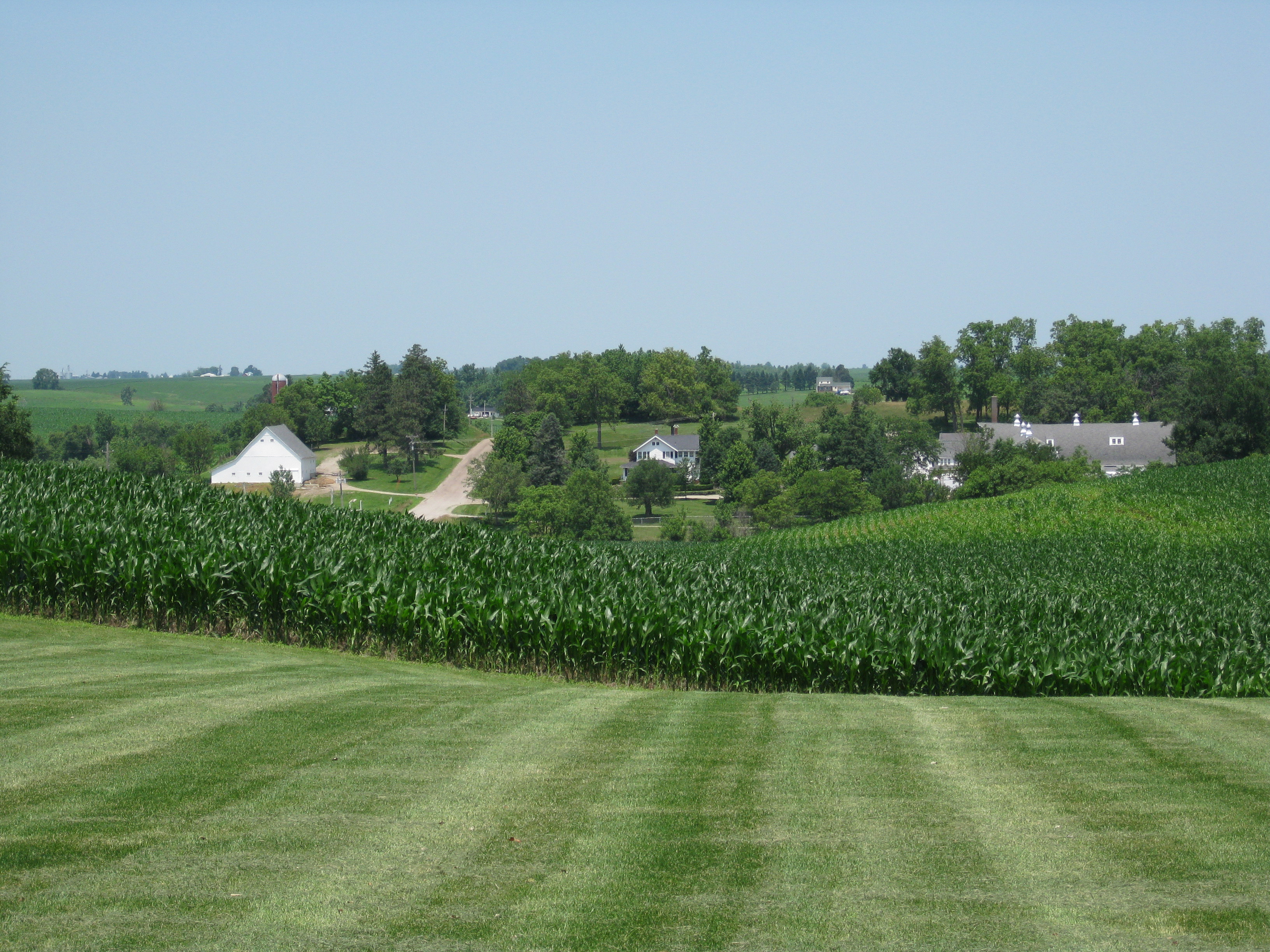
Central Iowa cornfield, part of the Corn Belt

This development was facilitated by the Morrill Act and the Hatch Act of 1887 which established in each state a land-grant university (with a mission to teach and study agriculture) and a federally funded system of agricultural experiment stations and cooperative extension networks which place extension agents in each state. Iowa State University became the nation's first designated land-grant institution when the Iowa Legislature accepted the provisions of the 1862 Morrill Act on September 11, 1862, making Iowa the first state in the nation to do so. Soybeans were not widely cultivated in the United States until the early 1930s, and by 1942, the U.S. became the world's largest soybean producer, partially because of World War II and the "need for domestic sources of fats, oils, and meal". Between 1930 and 1942, the United States' share of world soybean production skyrocketed from 3 percent to 46.5 percent, largely as a result of increase in the Midwest, and by 1969, it had risen to 76 percent. Iowa and Illinois rank first and second in the nation in soybean production. In 2012, Iowa produced 14.5 percent, and Illinois produced 13.3 percent of the nation's soybeans.

The tallgrass prairie has been converted into one of the most intensive crop producing areas in North America. Less than one tenth of one percent (<0.09%) of the original landcover of the tallgrass prairie biome remains. States formerly with landcover in native tallgrass prairie such as Iowa, Illinois, Minnesota, Wisconsin, Nebraska, and Missouri have become valued for their highly productive soils.

The Corn Belt is a region of the Midwest where corn has, since the 1850s, been the predominant crop, replacing the native tall grasses. The "Corn Belt" region is defined typically to include Iowa, Illinois, Indiana, southern Michigan, western Ohio, eastern Nebraska, eastern Kansas, southern Minnesota, and parts of Missouri. As of 2008, the top four corn-producing states were Iowa, Illinois, Nebraska, and Minnesota, together accounting for more than half of the corn grown in the United States. The Corn Belt also sometimes is defined to include parts of South Dakota, North Dakota, Wisconsin, and Kentucky. The region is characterized by relatively level land and deep, fertile soils, high in organic matter.

Iowa produces the largest corn crop of any state. In 2012, Iowa farmers produced 18.3 percent of the nation's corn, while Illinois produced 15.3 percent. In 2011, there were 13.7 million harvested acres of corn for grain, producing 2.36 billion bushels, which yielded 172.0 bu/acre, with US$14.5 billion of corn value of production.

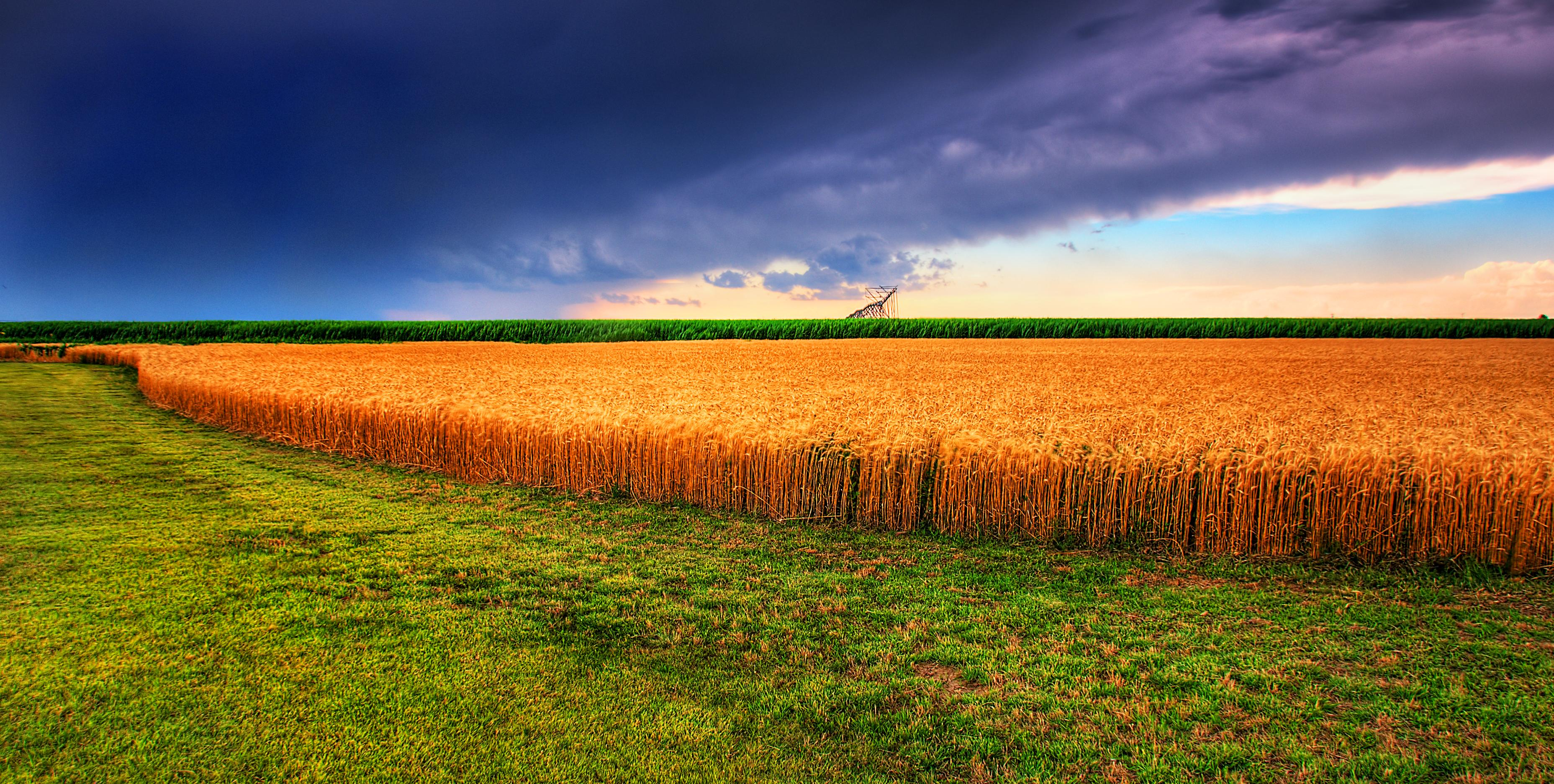
Wheat production in Kansas

Wheat is produced throughout the Midwest and is the principal cereal grain in the country. The U.S. is ranked third in production volume of wheat, with almost 58 million tons produced in the 2012–2013 growing season, behind only China and India (the combined production of all European Union nations is larger than China) The U.S. ranks first in crop export volume; almost 50 percent of total wheat produced is exported. The U.S. Department of Agriculture defines eight official classes of wheat: durum wheat, hard red spring wheat, hard red winter wheat, soft red winter wheat, hard white wheat, soft white wheat, unclassed wheat, and mixed wheat. Winter wheat accounts for 70 to 80 percent of total production in the U.S., with the largest amounts produced in Kansas (10.8 million tons) and North Dakota (9.8 million tons). Of the total wheat produced in the country, 50 percent is exported, valued at US$9 billion.

Midwestern states also lead the nation in other agricultural commodities, including pork (Iowa), beef and veal (Nebraska), dairy (Wisconsin), and chicken eggs (Iowa).

=== Finance ===
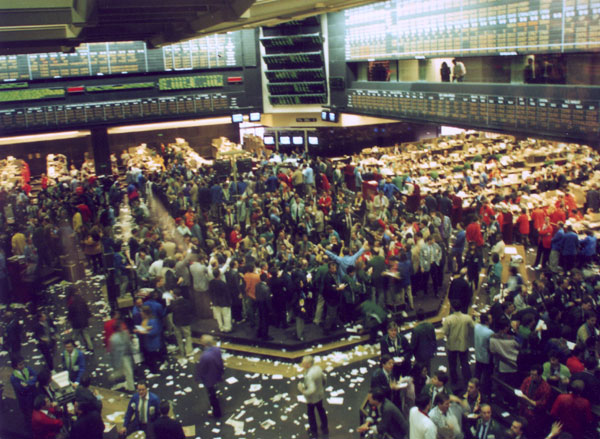
The Chicago Board of Trade floor in 1993. It is one of the world's oldest futures and options exchanges.

Chicago is the largest economic and financial center of the Midwest, and has the third largest gross metropolitan product in North America—approximately $967 billion in 2025, after the regions of New York City and Los Angeles. Chicago was named the fourth most important business center in the world in the MasterCard Worldwide Centers of Commerce Index. The 2021 Global Financial Centres Index ranked Chicago as the fourth most competitive city in the country and eleventh in the world, directly behind Paris and Tokyo. The Chicago Board of Trade (established 1848) listed the first ever standardized "exchange traded" forward contracts, which were called futures contracts. As a world financial center, Chicago is home to major financial and futures exchanges including CME Group, which owns the Chicago Mercantile Exchange ("the Merc"), Chicago Board of Trade (CBOT), the New York Mercantile Exchange (NYMEX), 27% of S&P Dow Jones Indices, and the Commodities Exchange Inc. (COMEX). Other major exchanges include Cboe Global Markets, operator of the largest options exchange in the Western Hemisphere; and the Chicago Stock Exchange. Chicago is also home to the headquarters of the Federal Reserve Bank of Chicago, the Seventh District of the Federal Reserve.

Outside of Chicago, many other Midwest cities are host to financial centers as well. Federal Reserve Bank districts are also headquartered in Cleveland, Kansas City, Minneapolis, and St. Louis. Major United States bank headquarters are located throughout Ohio including Huntington Bancshares in Columbus, Fifth Third Bank in Cincinnati, and KeyCorp in Cleveland. Insurance Companies such as Elevance Health in Indianapolis, Nationwide Insurance in Columbus, American Family Insurance in Madison, Wisconsin, Berkshire Hathaway in Omaha, State Farm Insurance in Bloomington, Illinois, Reinsurance Group of America in Chesterfield, Missouri, Cincinnati Financial Corporation and American Modern Insurance Group of Cincinnati, and Progressive Insurance and Medical Mutual of Ohio in Cleveland also spread throughout the Midwest.

=== Manufacturing ===
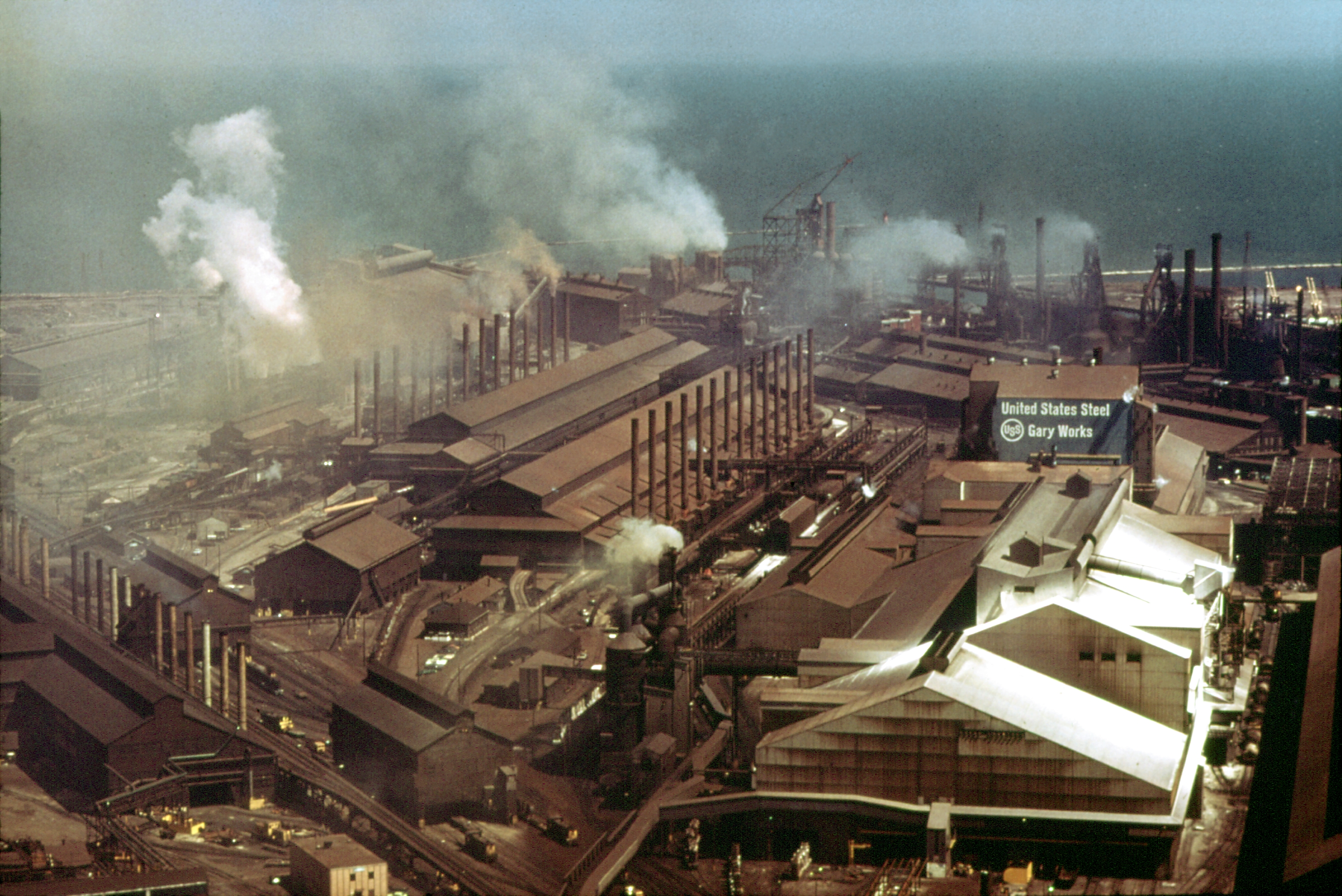
The Gary Works of Gary, Indiana (seen here in 1973) is the largest integrated steel mill in North America.

Navigable terrain, waterways, and ports spurred an unprecedented construction of transportation infrastructure throughout the region. The region is a global leader in advanced manufacturing and research and development, with significant innovations in both production processes and business organization. John D. Rockefeller's Standard Oil set precedents for centralized pricing, uniform distribution, and controlled product standards through Standard Oil, which started as a consolidated refinery in Cleveland. Cyrus McCormick's Reaper and other manufacturers of agricultural machinery consolidated into International Harvester in Chicago. Andrew Carnegie's steel production integrated large-scale open-hearth and Bessemer processes into the world's most efficient and profitable mills. The largest, most comprehensive monopoly in the world, United States Steel, consolidated steel production throughout the region. Many of the world's largest employers began in the Great Lakes region.

Advantages of accessible waterways, highly developed transportation infrastructure, finance, and a prosperous market base makes the region the global leader in automobile production and a global business location. Henry Ford's movable assembly line and integrated production set the model and standard for major car manufactures. The Detroit area emerged as the world's automotive center, with facilities throughout the region. Akron, Ohio became the global leader in rubber production, driven by the demand for tires. Over 200 million tons of cargo are shipped annually through the Great Lakes.

== Culture ==
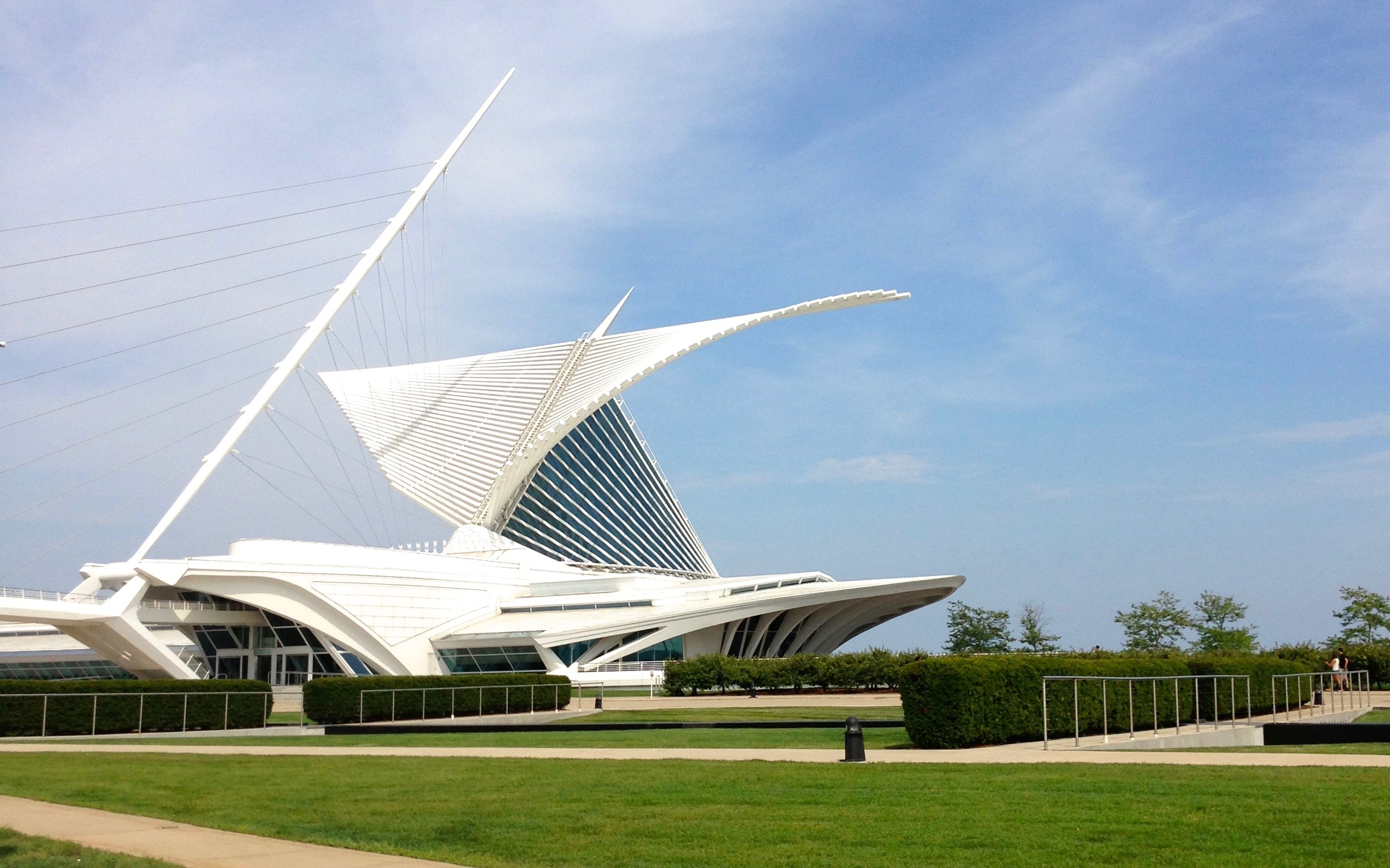
The Milwaukee Art Museum is located on Lake Michigan.

Following the sociological Middletown studies of 1929, which were based on Muncie, Indiana, commentators took Midwestern cities and the Midwest generally to be "typical" of the United States. Earlier, the rhetorical question Will it play in Peoria? had become a stock phrase, using Peoria, Illinois to signal whether something would appeal to mainstream America. As of 2010 the Midwest has a higher employment-to-population ratio than the Northeastern United States, the Southern United States, or the Western United States.

Euchre, a trick-taking card game, remains popular in the Midwest and parts of the Upper South, particularly in Michigan, Illinois, Indiana, Ohio, Kentucky, and Pennsylvania.

=== Education ===
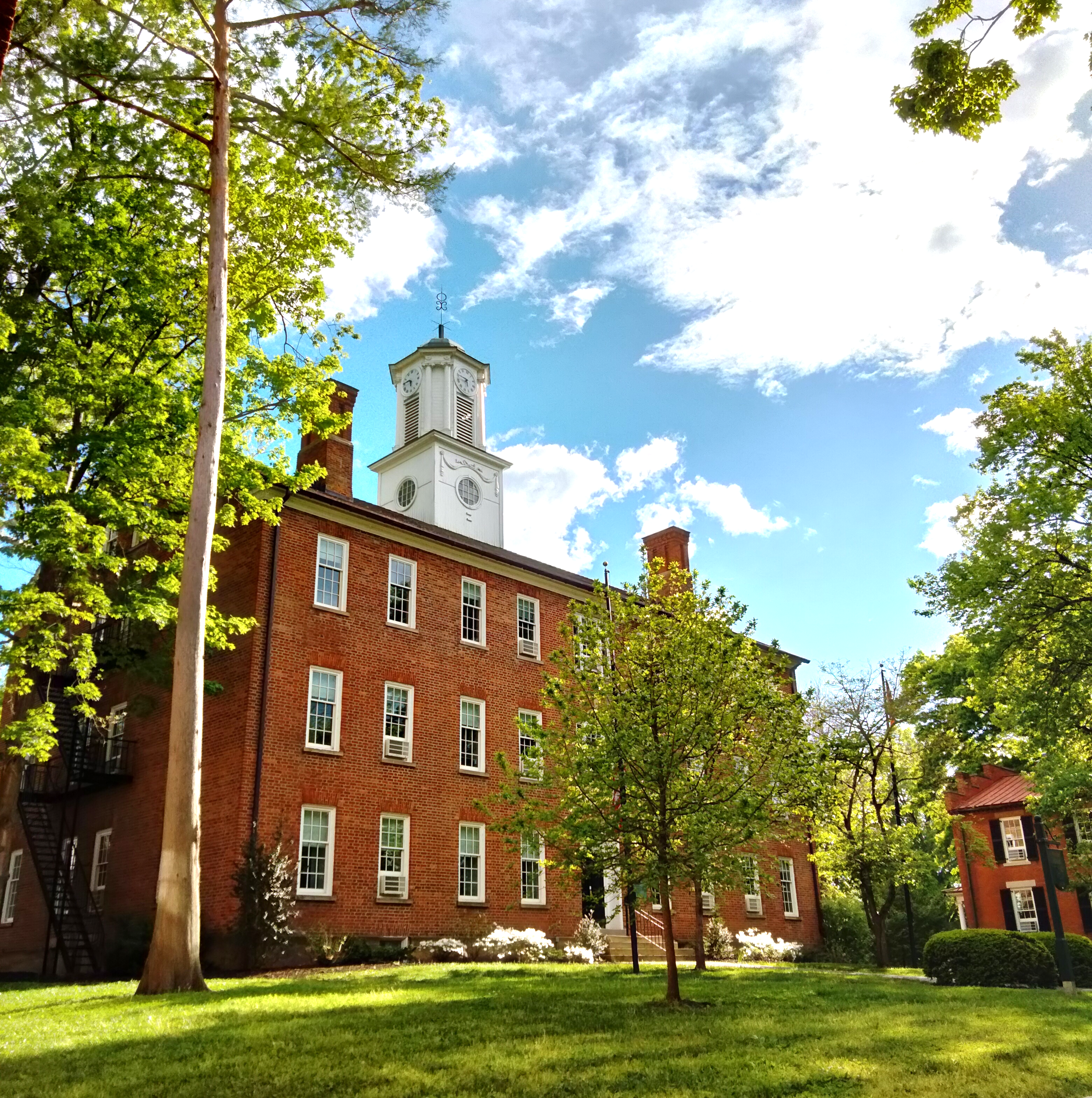
Manasseh Cutler Hall, constructed by 1816, was the first academic building in the former Northwest Territory.

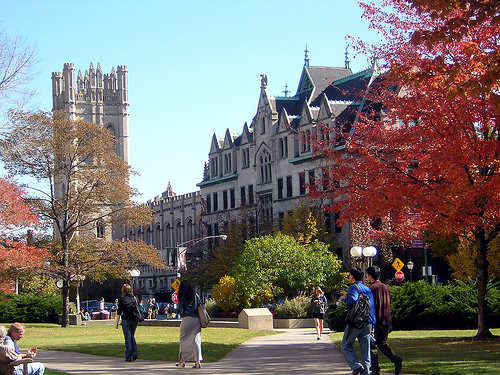
The University of Chicago is considered among the most prestigious universities in the US.

Many Midwestern universities are members of the Association of American Universities (AAU), a bi-national organization founded in Chicago of leading research universities. Of the 69 members from the U.S. and Canada, 17 are located in the Midwest. These include private schools Case Western Reserve University, the University of Chicago, Northwestern University, University of Notre Dame, and Washington University in St. Louis and public institutions, the University of Illinois Urbana–Champaign, Indiana University Bloomington, the University of Iowa, the University of Kansas, the University of Michigan, Michigan State University, the University of Minnesota, the University of Missouri, the Ohio State University, Purdue University, and the University of Wisconsin–Madison.

Other notable major research-intensive public universities include the University of Cincinnati, the University of Illinois at Chicago, Indiana University Indianapolis, Iowa State University, Kansas State University, the University of Nebraska–Lincoln, Ohio University, Southern Illinois University, and Wayne State University.

Numerous state university systems have established regional campuses statewide. The numerous state teachers colleges were upgraded into state universities after 1945.

Other notable private institutions include Beloit College, John Carroll University, Saint Louis University, Butler University, Loyola University Chicago, DePaul University, Creighton University, Drake University, Marquette University, University of Dayton, and Xavier University. Local boosters, usually with a church affiliation, created numerous colleges in the mid-19th century. In terms of national rankings, the most prominent liberal arts colleges today include Augustana College, Carleton College, Denison University, DePauw University, Earlham College, Grinnell College, Hamline University, Kalamazoo College, Kenyon College, Knox College, Macalester College, Lawrence University, Oberlin College, St. Olaf College, College of Saint Benedict and Saint John's University, Mount Union University, Wabash College, Wheaton College, and The College of Wooster.

=== Health ===
The rate of potentially preventable hospitalizations in the Midwestern United States fell from 2005 to 2011 for overall conditions, acute conditions, and chronic conditions.

=== Linguistics ===
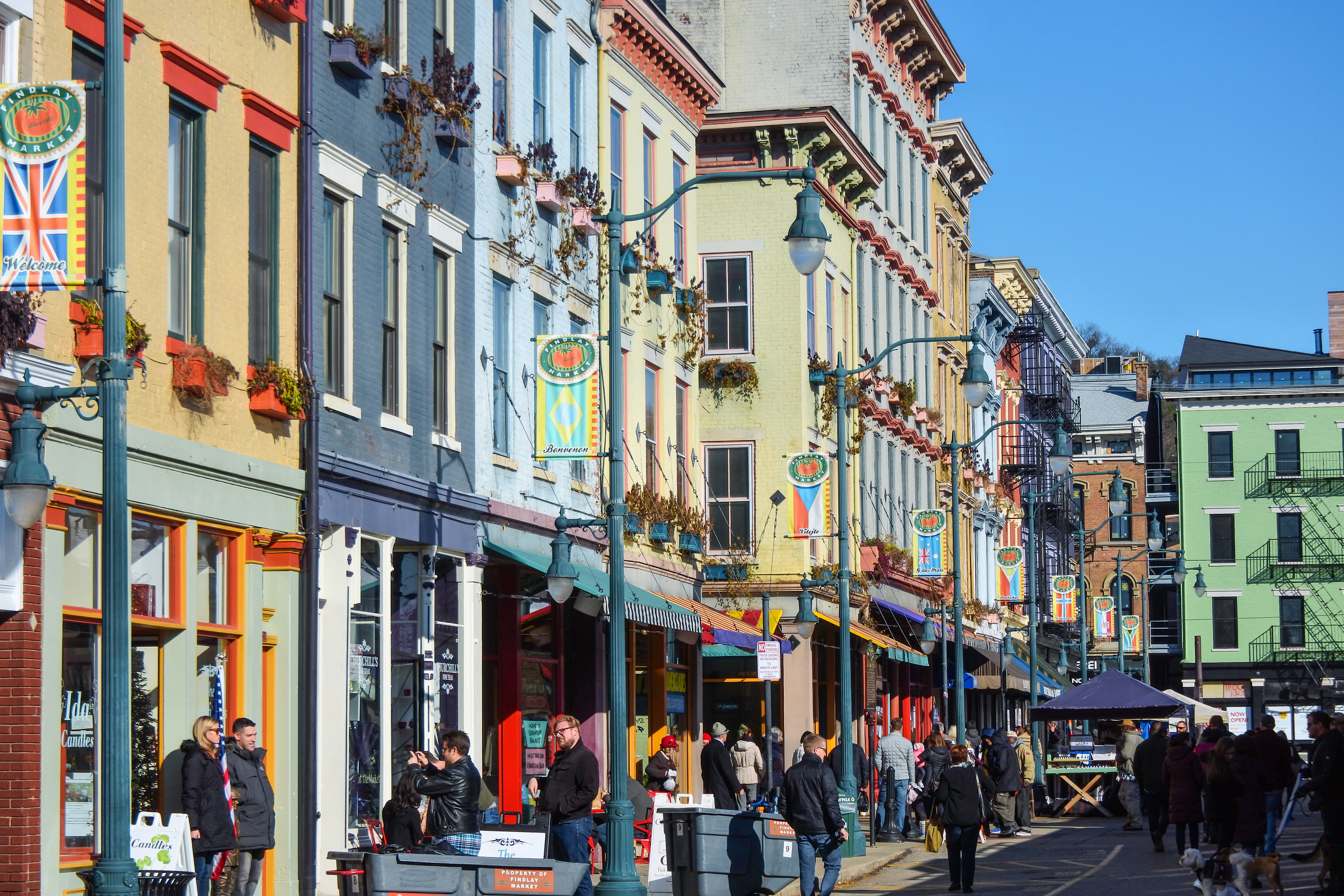
Over-the-Rhine in Cincinnati

The accents of the region are generally distinct from those of the American South and of the urban areas of the American Northeast. To a lesser degree, they are also distinct from the accent of the American West.

The accent characteristic of most of the Midwest is popularly considered to be that of "standard" American English or General American. This accent is typically preferred by many national radio and television producers. Linguist Thomas Bonfiglio argues that, "American English pronunciation standardized as 'network standard' or, informally, 'Midwestern' in the 20th century." He identifies radio as the chief factor.

Currently, many cities in the Great Lakes region are undergoing the Northern Cities Vowel Shift away from the standard pronunciation of vowels.

The dialect of Minnesota, western Wisconsin, much of North Dakota and Michigan's Upper Peninsula is referred to as the Upper Midwestern Dialect (or "Minnesotan"), and has Scandinavian and Canadian influences.

Missouri has elements of three dialects, specifically: Northern Midland, in the extreme northern part of the state, with a distinctive variation in St. Louis and the surrounding area; Southern Midland, in the majority of the state; and Southern, in the southwestern and southeastern parts of the state, with a bulge extending north in the central part, to include approximately the southern one-third.

=== Music ===
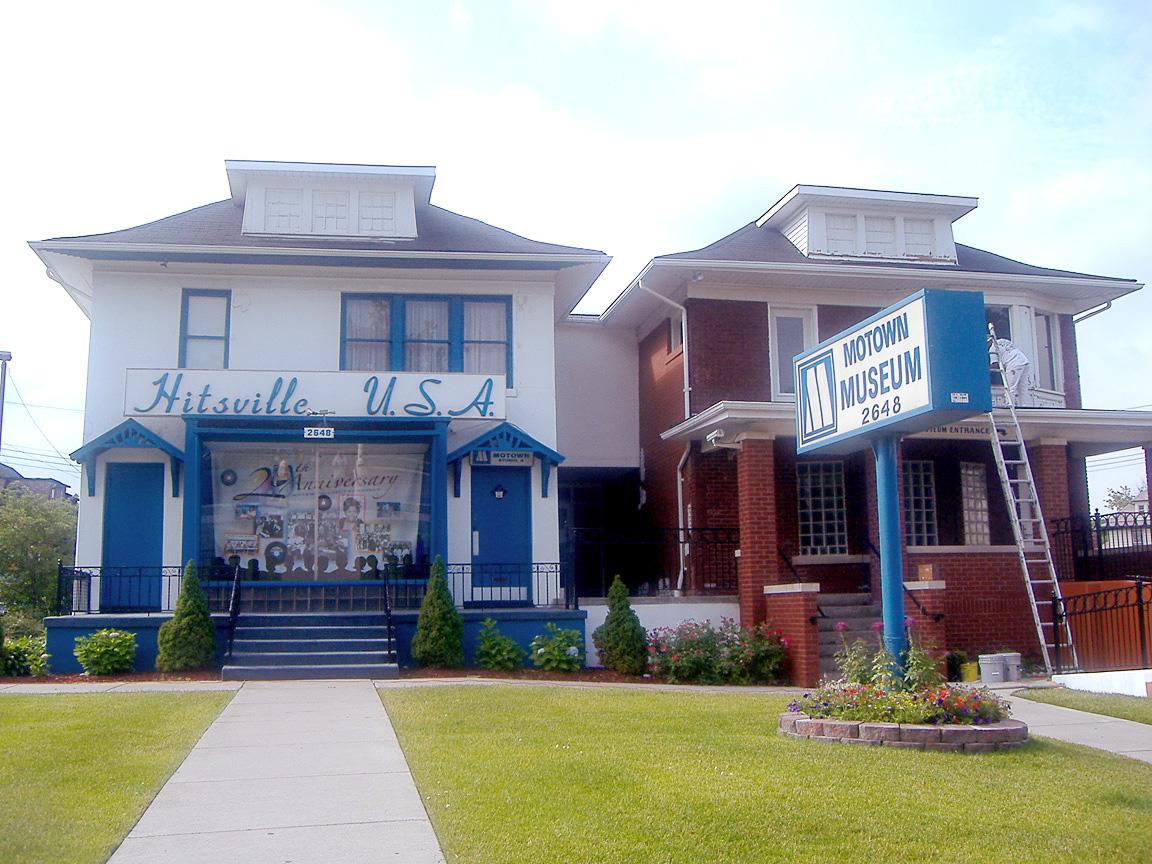
The Hitsville U.S.A. building in Detroit was the first headquarters and studio of Motown, which played an important role in the racial integration of popular music.

The heavy German immigration played a major role in establishing musical traditions, especially choral and orchestral music. Czech and German traditions combined to sponsor the polka.

The Southern Diaspora of the 20th century saw more than twenty million Southerners move throughout the country, many of whom moved into major Midwestern industrial cities such as Chicago, Detroit, Cleveland, and St. Louis. Along with them, they brought jazz to the Midwest, as well as blues, bluegrass, and rock and roll, with major contributions to jazz, funk, and R&B, and even new subgenres such as the Motown Sound and techno from Detroit or house music from Chicago. In the 1920s, South Side Chicago was the base for Jelly Roll Morton (1890–1941). Kansas City developed its own jazz style.

The electrified Chicago blues sound exemplifies the genre, as popularized by record labels Chess and Alligator and portrayed in film The Blues Brothers.

Rock and roll music was first identified as a new genre in 1951 by Cleveland disc jockey Alan Freed who began playing this music style while popularizing the term "rock and roll" to describe it. By the mid-1950s, rock and roll emerged as a defined musical style in the United States, deriving most directly from the rhythm and blues music of the 1940s, which itself developed from earlier blues, boogie woogie, jazz, and swing music, and was also influenced by gospel, country and western, and traditional folk music. Freed's contribution in identifying rock as a new genre helped establish the Rock and Roll Hall of Fame, located in Cleveland. Chuck Berry, a Midwesterner from St. Louis, influenced many other rock musicians.

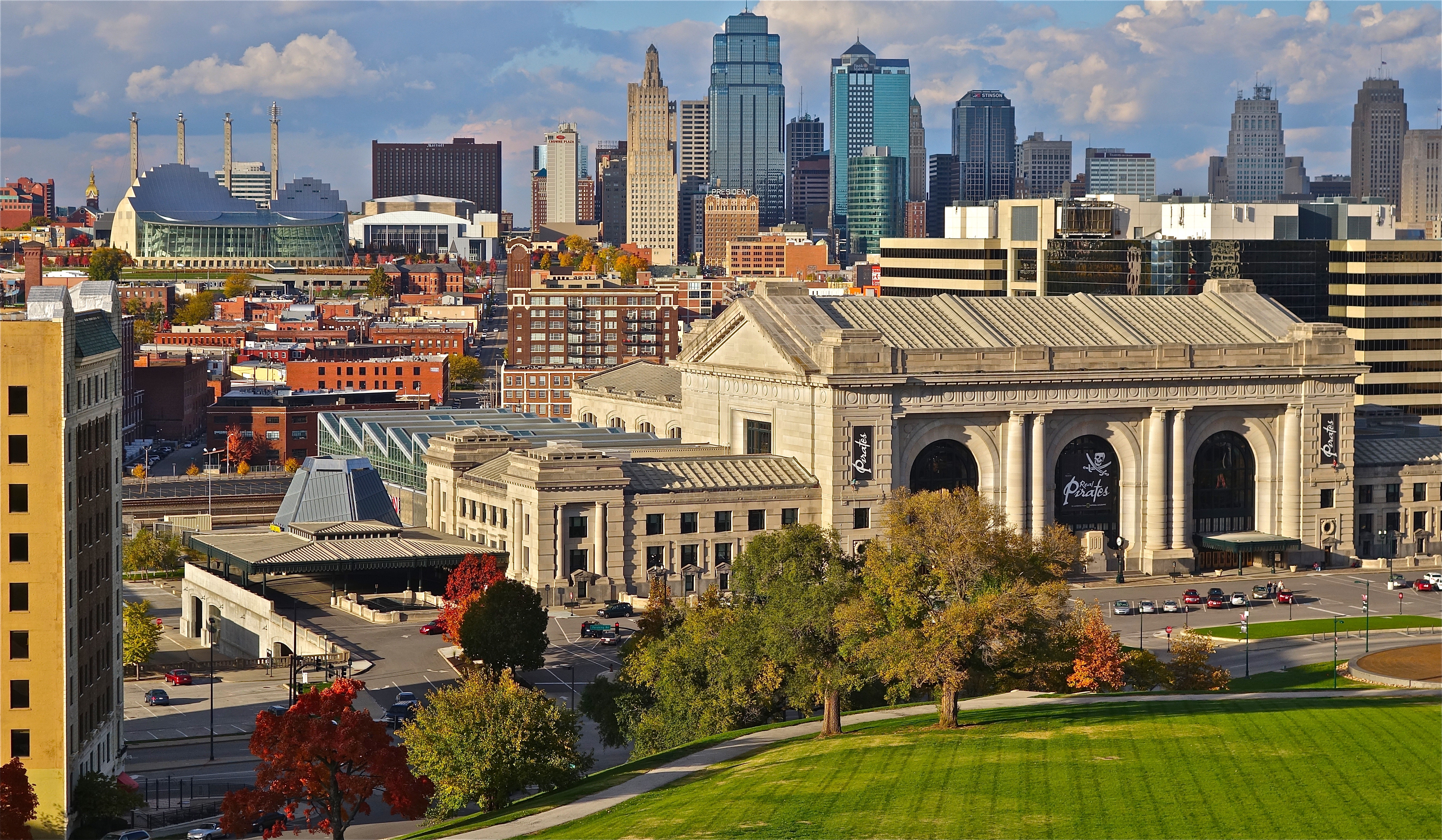
Downtown Kansas City looking over Union Station

Since the founding of rock 'n' roll music, an uncountable number of rock, soul, R&B, hip-hop, dance, blues, and jazz acts have emerged from Chicago onto the global and national music scene. Detroit has greatly contributed to the international music scene as a result of being the original home of the legendary Motown Records. Notable soul and R&B musicians associated with Motown that had their origins in the area include Aretha Franklin, the Supremes, Mary Wells, Four Tops, the Jackson 5, Smokey Robinson & the Miracles, Stevie Wonder, the Marvelettes, the Temptations, and Martha and the Vandellas. These artists achieved their greatest success in the 1960s and 1970s.

Midwest music fans loved country music, heavy metal, arena rock, heartland rock, and TOP 40. In the 1970s and 1980s, native Midwestern musicians such as Bob Seger, John Mellencamp and Warren Zevon found great success with a style of rock music that came to be known as heartland rock, characterized by lyrical themes that focused on and appealed to the Midwestern working class. Other successful Midwestern rock artists emerged during this time, including REO Speedwagon (Illinois), Styx (Illinois), Kansas,Prince, The Time, Morris Day, Jesse Johnson, Alexander O'Neal, The Family (USA), St. Paul (Paul Peterson), Apollonia 6, Vanity 6, Sheila E., and Jimmy Jam and Terry Lewis recorded Minneapolis sound.

House Music, the first form of Electronic Dance Music, had its beginning in Chicago in the early 1980s, and by the late 1980s and the early 1990s house music had become popular on an international scale. House artists such as Frankie Knuckles, Marshall Jefferson released many house music records. With the creation of house music in the city of Chicago, the first form of the globally popular electronic dance music genre was created. Techno had its start in Detroit in the late 1980s and early 1990s with techno pioneers such as Juan Atkins, Derrick May, and Kevin Saunderson. The genre, while popular in America, became much more popular overseas such as in Europe.

Numerous classical composers live and have lived in midwestern states, including Easley Blackwood, Kenneth Gaburo, Salvatore Martirano, and Ralph Shapey (Illinois); Glenn Miller and Meredith Willson (Iowa); Leslie Bassett, William Bolcom, Michael Daugherty, and David Gillingham (Michigan); Donald Erb (Ohio); Dominick Argento and Stephen Paulus (Minnesota).

=== Sports ===
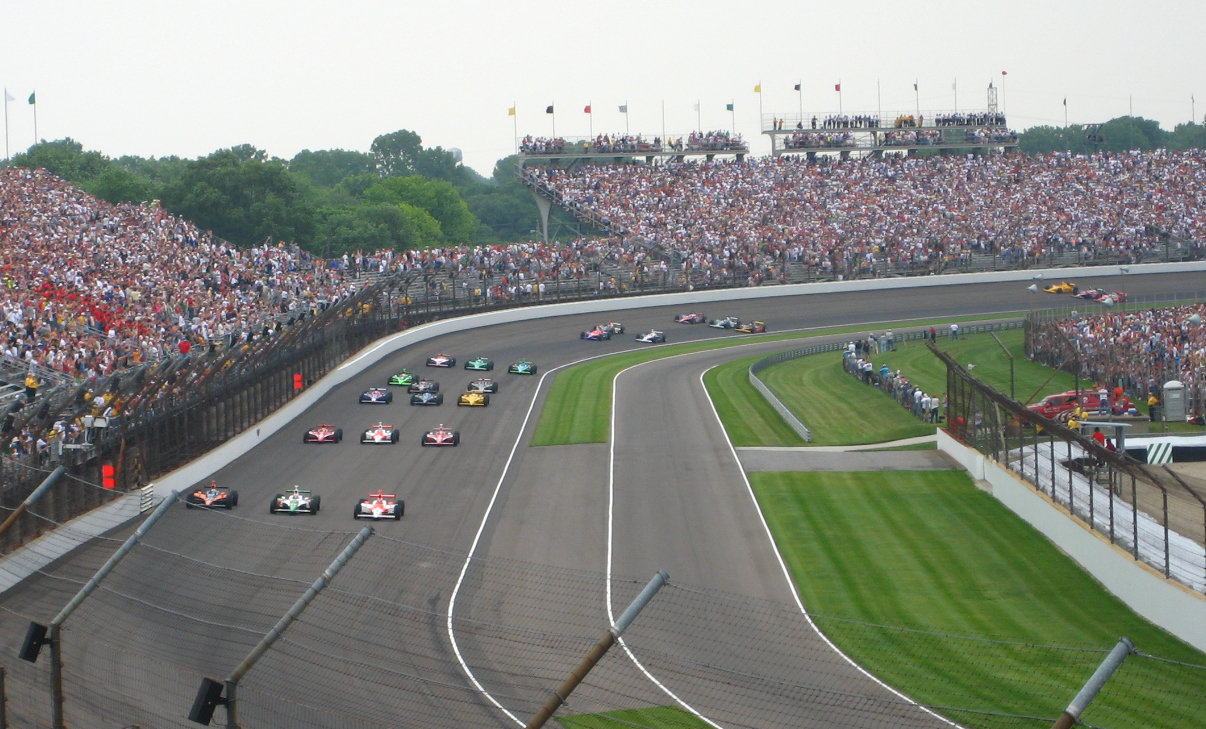
The 2007 Indianapolis 500 at Indianapolis Motor Speedway

Professional sports leagues such as the National Football League (NFL), Major League Baseball (MLB), National Basketball Association (NBA), Women's National Basketball Association (WNBA), National Hockey League (NHL), Major League Soccer (MLS), and National Women's Soccer League (NWSL), have team franchises in following Midwestern cities:

- Chicago: Bears (NFL), Cubs, White Sox (MLB), Bulls (NBA), Sky (WNBA), Blackhawks (NHL), Fire (MLS), Stars (NWSL)
- Cincinnati: Bengals (NFL), Reds (MLB), FC Cincinnati (MLS)
- Cleveland: Browns (NFL), Guardians (MLB), Cavaliers (NBA)
- Columbus: Blue Jackets (NHL), Crew (MLS)
- Detroit: Lions (NFL), Tigers (MLB), Pistons (NBA), Red Wings (NHL)
- Green Bay: Packers (NFL)
- Indianapolis: Colts (NFL), Pacers (NBA), Fever (WNBA)
- Kansas City: Chiefs (NFL), Royals (MLB), Sporting or the Wizards (MLS), Current (NWSL)
- Milwaukee: Brewers (MLB), Bucks (NBA)
- Minneapolis–Saint Paul: Vikings (NFL), Twins (MLB), Timberwolves (NBA), Lynx (WNBA), Wild (NHL), United or the Loons (MLS)
- St. Louis: Cardinals (MLB), Blues (NHL), City SC (MLS)

Popular teams include the St. Louis Cardinals (11 World Series titles), Cincinnati Reds (5 World Series titles), Chicago Bulls (6 NBA titles), the Detroit Pistons (3 NBA titles), Milwaukee Bucks (2 NBA titles), the Minnesota Lynx (4 WNBA titles), the Green Bay Packers (4 Super Bowl titles, 13 total NFL championships), the Chicago Bears (1 Super Bowl title, 9 total NFL championships), the Cleveland Browns (4 AAFC championships, 4 NFL championships), the Kansas City Chiefs (3 Super Bowl titles, 4 total NFL championships), Kansas City Royals (2 World Series titles), the Detroit Red Wings (11 Stanley Cup titles), the Detroit Tigers (4 World Series titles), the Chicago Blackhawks (6 Stanley Cup titles), and the Columbus Crew (3 MLS Cups).

In NCAA college sports, the Big Ten Conference and the Big 12 Conference feature the largest concentration of top Midwestern Division I football and men's and women's basketball teams in the region, including the Cincinnati Bearcats, Illinois Fighting Illini, Indiana Hoosiers, Iowa Hawkeyes, Iowa State Cyclones, Kansas Jayhawks, Kansas State Wildcats, Michigan Wolverines, Michigan State Spartans, Minnesota Golden Gophers, Nebraska Cornhuskers, Northwestern Wildcats, Ohio State Buckeyes, Purdue Boilermakers, and the Wisconsin Badgers. Other notable Midwestern college sports teams include the Akron Zips, Ball State Cardinals, Butler Bulldogs, Creighton Bluejays, Central Michigan Chippewas Dayton Flyers, Grand Valley State Lakers, Indiana State Sycamores, Kent State Golden Flashes, Marquette Golden Eagles, Miami RedHawks, Milwaukee Panthers, Missouri Tigers, Missouri State Bears, Northern Illinois Huskies, North Dakota State Bison, Notre Dame Fighting Irish, Ohio Bobcats, South Dakota State Jackrabbits, Toledo Rockets, Western Michigan Broncos, Wichita State Shockers, and Xavier Musketeers. Of this second group of schools, Butler, Dayton, Indiana State, Missouri State, North Dakota State, and South Dakota State do not play top-level college football (all playing in the second-tier Division I FCS), and Creighton, Marquette, Milwaukee, Wichita State and Xavier do not sponsor football at all.

The Milwaukee Mile hosted its first automobile race in 1903, and is one of the oldest tracks in the world, though as of 2019 is presently inactive. The Indianapolis Motor Speedway, opened in 1909, is a prestigious auto racing track which annually hosts the internationally famous Indianapolis 500-Mile Race (part of the IndyCar series), the Brickyard 400 (NASCAR), and the IndyCar Grand Prix (IndyCar series). The Road America and Mid-Ohio road courses opened in the 1950s and 1960s respectively. Other motorsport venues in the Midwest are Indianapolis Raceway Park (home of the NHRA U.S. Nationals), Michigan International Speedway, Chicagoland Speedway, Kansas Speedway, Gateway International Raceway, and the Iowa Speedway. The Kentucky Speedway is just outside the officially defined Midwest, but is linked with the region because the track is located in the Cincinnati metropolitan area.

Notable professional golf tournaments in the Midwest include the Memorial Tournament, BMW Championship and John Deere Classic.

=== Cultural overlap ===
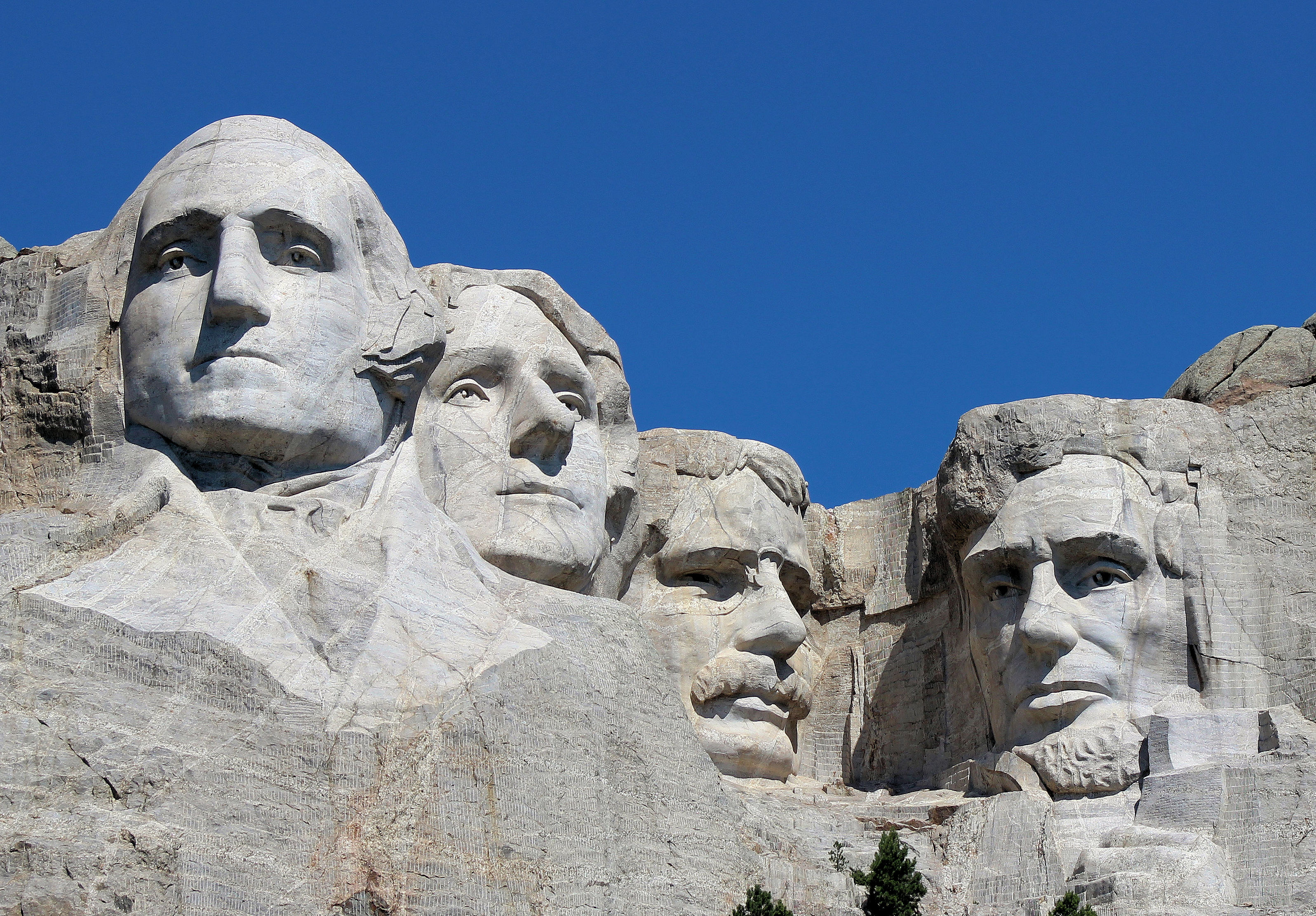
Mount Rushmore is located in the Black Hills of South Dakota.

Differences in the definition of the Midwest mainly split between the Great Plains region on one side, and the Great Lakes region on the other. Some point to the small towns and agricultural communities in Minnesota, Iowa, Missouri, and Illinois of the interior lowlands as representative of traditional Midwestern lifestyles and values, while the industrial cities and manufacturing identity of the Great Lakes and overlapping Rust Belt histories of 19th-century and early 20th-century immigration are less representative of the Midwestern region and viewed separately from the core Midwest. Similarly, the Great Plains states, especially their central and western parts share cultural and geographic elements with the Frontier West and ranching lifestyle and drier short grass prairie as the Great Plains are less associated with the true agricultural Midwest interior to the east.

One extreme outlier for instance is South Dakota. West River (the region west of the Missouri River) is home to the Black Hills, which is part of the greater Rocky Mountain Front and poseses cultural elements of the Mountain West of the United States, while East River has more in common with the rest of the Great Plains.

Two other regions, Appalachia and the Ozark Mountains, overlap geographically with the Midwest—Appalachia in Southern Ohio and the Ozarks in Southern Missouri. The Ohio River has long been a boundary between North and South and between the Midwest and the Upper South. All of the lower Midwestern states, especially Missouri, have major Southern components and influences, as they neighbor the Southern region. Historically, Missouri was a slave state before the American Civil War (1861–1865) due to the Missouri Compromise.

Western Pennsylvania, which contains the cities of Erie and Pittsburgh, shares history with the Midwest and overlaps with Appalachia and the Northeast as well.

Kentucky is not considered part of the Midwest; it is a northern region of the South, although certain northern parts of the state could have possibly been grouped with the Midwest in a geographical context, even though it is geographically in the Southeast overall. Kentucky is categorized as Southern by the U.S. Census Bureau due to its industries and especially from a historical and cultural standpoint with the majority of the state having a thoroughly majority Southern accent, demographic, history, and culture in line with her sister states of Virginia and Tennessee and even the areas that have certain Midwestern influences tend to be mixed with the native Southern culture of the area.

In addition to intra-American regional overlaps, the Upper Peninsula of Michigan has historically had strong cultural ties to Canada, partly as a result of early settlement by French Canadians. Moreover, the Yooper accent shares some traits with Canadian English, further demonstrating transnational cultural connections. Similar but less pronounced mutual Canadian-American cultural influence occurs throughout the Great Lakes region.

== Politics ==
Midwestern governors by party as of 2024

Midwestern U.S. senators by party for the 118th Congress

Midwestern U.S. representatives by party for the 118th Congress

The Midwestern United States is a politically divided region, with the Democratic Party being stronger in the Great Lakes Region and the Republican Party being stronger in the Great Plains regions. The Upper Midwestern states of Illinois, Michigan, and Wisconsin reliably voted Democratic in every presidential election from 1992 to 2012. Meanwhile, Minnesota has the longest Democratic voting streak in the nation, having last voted for a Republican presidential candidate in 1972. Recently, Republicans have made serious inroads in Iowa and Ohio, two states that were previously considered swing states.

Missouri has been won by Republicans in every presidential election since 2000, despite its former bellwether status. Indiana has been won by Republicans in every presidential election since 1940, except for Lyndon Johnson in 1964 and Barack Obama in 2008. The Great Plains states of North Dakota, South Dakota, Nebraska, and Kansas have voted for the Republican candidate in every presidential election since 1940, except for Democrat Lyndon B. Johnson in 1964. The unicameral Nebraska Legislature is officially nonpartisan.

All Midwestern states use primary elections to select delegates for both the Democratic and Republican national conventions, except for Iowa. The Iowa caucuses in early January of leap years are the first votes in the presidential nominating process for both major parties, and attract enormous media attention.

=== East North Central ===
As of 2025, the state government of Illinois currently has a Democratic Governor J.B. Pritzker and Democratic supermajorities in both houses of the Illinois General Assembly. Illinois also has 2 Democratic U.S. senators and a 14–3 Democratic majority U.S. House delegation.

As of 2025, Wisconsin has a Democratic Governor Tony Evers and a Republican-controlled Wisconsin Legislature. Wisconsin also has 1 Democratic and 1 Republican senator and a 6-2 Republican majority U.S. House delegation. Wisconsin is considered a purple state, as the state was decided by less than 1 percentage point in 2016, 2020, and 2024, with the nationwide winner also taking Wisconsin each time.

From 1992 to 2012, Michigan consistently voted for the Democratic presidential candidate, though in four of those six elections, the margin of victory was in the single digits. Beginning in 2016, it has evolved into a true swing state, with Donald Trump winning Michigan in his two successful presidential bids in 2016 and 2024. The Michigan Legislature is also closely divided; the Democrats currently hold the minimum 20-18 majority in the Senate and the Republicans hold a narrow 58-52 majority in the House. As of 2025, Michigan has 2 Democratic U.S. senators (it last elected a Republican senator in 1994) and a 7-6 bare Republican majority in their U.S. House of Representatives delegation.

Indiana is considered a Republican stronghold, having voting for that party's presidential candidate in every election since 1940, except for Johnson in 1964 and Barack Obama in 2008. As of 2025, the Republican party controls both U.S. Senate seats, has a 7–2 majority U.S. House congressional delegation, and has a state-level trifecta (the governorship and both houses of the Indiana General Assembly).

As of 2025, Ohio currently has a Republican Governor Mike DeWine and Republican majorities in the Ohio General Assembly. Ohio also has 2 Republican U.S. senators and a 10-5 Republican majority U.S. House delegation. Ohio has been a battleground state in presidential elections, and no Republican has won the office without winning Ohio. Donald Trump won Ohio by about 8 percentage points in both the 2016 and 2020 presidential elections, signaling a shift towards the right for the state's federal electorate. The 2022 midterms resulted in strong Republican support at the state level, and moderate Republican support at the federal level, with Republican governor Mike DeWine winning reelection in a landslide and Republican author JD Vance winning election to the U.S. Senate by about 6 percentage points. Ohio's rightward shift continued in 2024, with Trump (and Vance as his running mate) once again winning the Buckeye State, this time increasing his margin of victory to more than 11 percentage points, becoming the first presidential candidate to win the state by double digits since George H. W. Bush in 1988 and having the largest margin of victory for any candidate since the 1984 landslide reelection of Ronald Reagan. Additionally, Republican challenger Bernie Moreno defeated three-term incumbent Democrat Sherrod Brown in the state's Senate election. With Moreno's election, this meant that with the exception of Jennifer Brunner on the state Supreme Court, all statewide elected officials in Ohio are now Republicans.

=== West North Central ===
The Great Plains states of North Dakota, South Dakota, Nebraska, and Kansas have been strongholds for the Republicans for many decades. These four states have gone for the Republican candidate in every presidential election since 1940, except for Lyndon B. Johnson's landslide over Barry Goldwater in 1964. Although North Dakota and South Dakota have often elected Democrats to Congress, after the 2012 election both states' congressional delegations are majority Republican. Nebraska has elected Democrats to the Senate and as governor in recent years, but both of its senators have been Republican since the retirement of Ben Nelson in 2012. Kansas has elected a majority of Democrats as governor since 1956, but has not elected a Democratic senator since 1932. From 1997 to 2010 and again since 2019, Kansas has had at least one Democratic House member (two in 2007 and '08).

Iowa had a Democratic governor from 1999 until Terry Branstad was re-elected in the mid-term elections in 2010, and has had both one Democratic and one Republican senator since the early 1980s until the 2014 election when Republican Joni Ernst defeated Democrat Bruce Braley in a tightly contested race. Between 1988 and 2012, Iowa also voted for the Democratic presidential candidate in all elections except 2004 (backing George W. Bush by less than 1%), but in 2016 and 2020 Donald Trump won the state by about 9 and 8 percentage points, respectively. Since the 2016 elections, Republicans have held a majority in both houses of the Iowa General Assembly. Following the 2022 elections, Iowa is considered a red state as Republicans hold all but one statewide office, both U.S. Senate seats, all four U.S. House seats, and Republican governor Kim Reynolds was reelected by a margin of nearly 20 points. Trump won Iowa for a third time in 2024, this time by more than 13 percentage points, the largest margin of victory for a Republican in the state since Richard Nixon in 1972.

Minnesota voters have not voted for a Republican candidate for president since 1972, longer than any other state. Minnesota was the only state (along with Washington, D.C.) to vote for its native son Walter Mondale over Ronald Reagan in 1984. However, recent Democratic victories have often been fairly narrow, such as the 2016 presidential election. The Democratic Party controls all statewide offices as of 2025 and hold the minimum 34-33 majority in the State Senate, but they do not have a governing trifecta since the State House is evenly split 67-67. The Minnesota congressional delegation has 2 Democratic senators but a 4-4 evenly split U.S. House delegation.

Missouri was historically considered a bellwether state, having voted for the winner in every presidential election from 1904 to 2004 except for 1956, when it backed losing Democrat Adlai Stevenson by 0.22% and less than 4,000 votes. Democrats generally only hold sway in the large cities at the opposite ends of the state, Kansas City and St. Louis, along with Columbia, halfway between Kansas City and St. Louis and home to the University of Missouri, with the Republicans winning the rest of the state. Since the 2012 elections, Republicans have had a 6–2 majority in the state's U.S. House delegation, with African-American Democrats representing the two major cities. Missouri has had a Republican governor since the 2016 elections, as well as both U.S. senators being Republican since the 2018 United States Senate elections. As of 2025, Republicans have supermajorities in both houses of the Missouri General Assembly.

== See also ==
- List of online encyclopedias of U.S. states, free encyclopedias typically maintained by state historical societies, universities, or humanities councils
- Cuisine of the Midwestern United States
- Territories of the United States on stamps
