= Territories of the United States on stamps =

Representation of U.S. territories, not yet states, on stamps

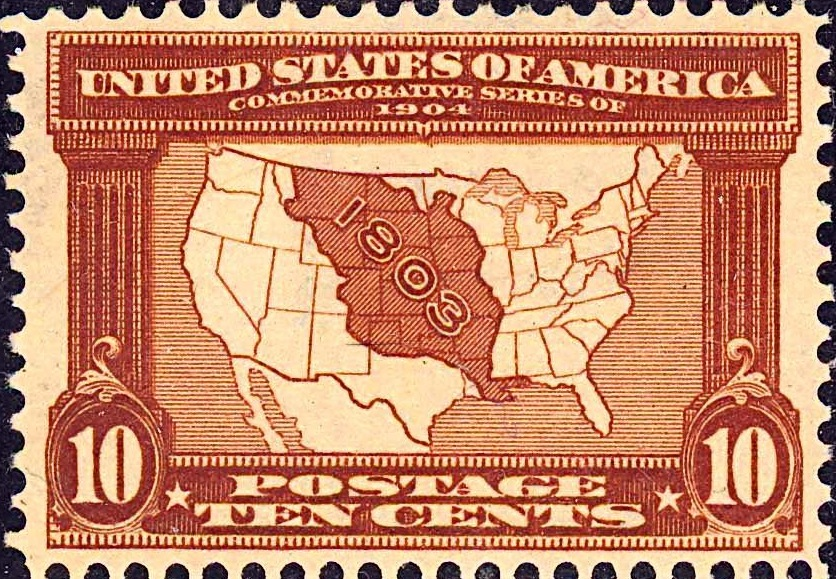
First U.S. stamp to commemorate a territory and depict a map. Issue of 1904

Territories of the United States on stamps discusses commemorative postal issues devoted to lands that have been ceded to the nation or purchased by treaty in conjunction with both war and peace. Thirteen states have been created from colonial territories, two from independent republics, four from previous states in the Union, and an additional thirty-one from United States territories.

Many aspects of acquisition, settlement and exploration have been celebrated on postage stamps. These are represented below in issues that appeared prior to 1978 (the images of subsequent stamps remain under copyright by the United States Postal Service and may not be reproduced).

== National boundaries ==
=== Treaty of Paris ===
From the territory ceded by Great Britain in the Treaty of Paris 1783, five states were to emerge from the Northwest Territory, two from the Southwest Territory. States under the Articles of Confederation ceded their claims to western lands, allowing Congress to administer territories until statehood; the practice was extended under the Constitution. From the Northwest Territory came Ohio, Indiana, Illinois, Michigan and Wisconsin. From The Southwest Territory came Mississippi and Alabama.

A 3-cent stamp was issued on July 13, 1937, to commemorate the 150th anniversary of the Northwest Territory as defined by the Ordinance of 1787. The Territory consisted of lands north of the Ohio River and east of the Mississippi River ceded by eastern states. The Ordinance established the Territory, banned slavery, and specified that land must be purchased from the Indians and offered for sale by the United States. It also made provision for temporary and permanent governments and eventual statehood of included regions based on population. The stamp shows a map of the Territory which is flanked by Manasseh Cutler who drafted the ordinance, and Rufus Putnam, superintendent of territorial settlement. The 150th anniversary of establishment of the Mississippi Territory was celebrated by a 3-cent stamp on April 7, 1948. The vignette shows an outline map of the region of today's Mississippi and Alabama. The present Mississippi is shown in a darker tone. The map is divided into three sections with dates 1798, 1804, and 1812, showing the growth of the Territory. Over the map is the original seal of the Territory on which the second double "s" of Mississippi is written as a single "s." The portrait is of Winthrop Sargent, first governor of Mississippi Territory.

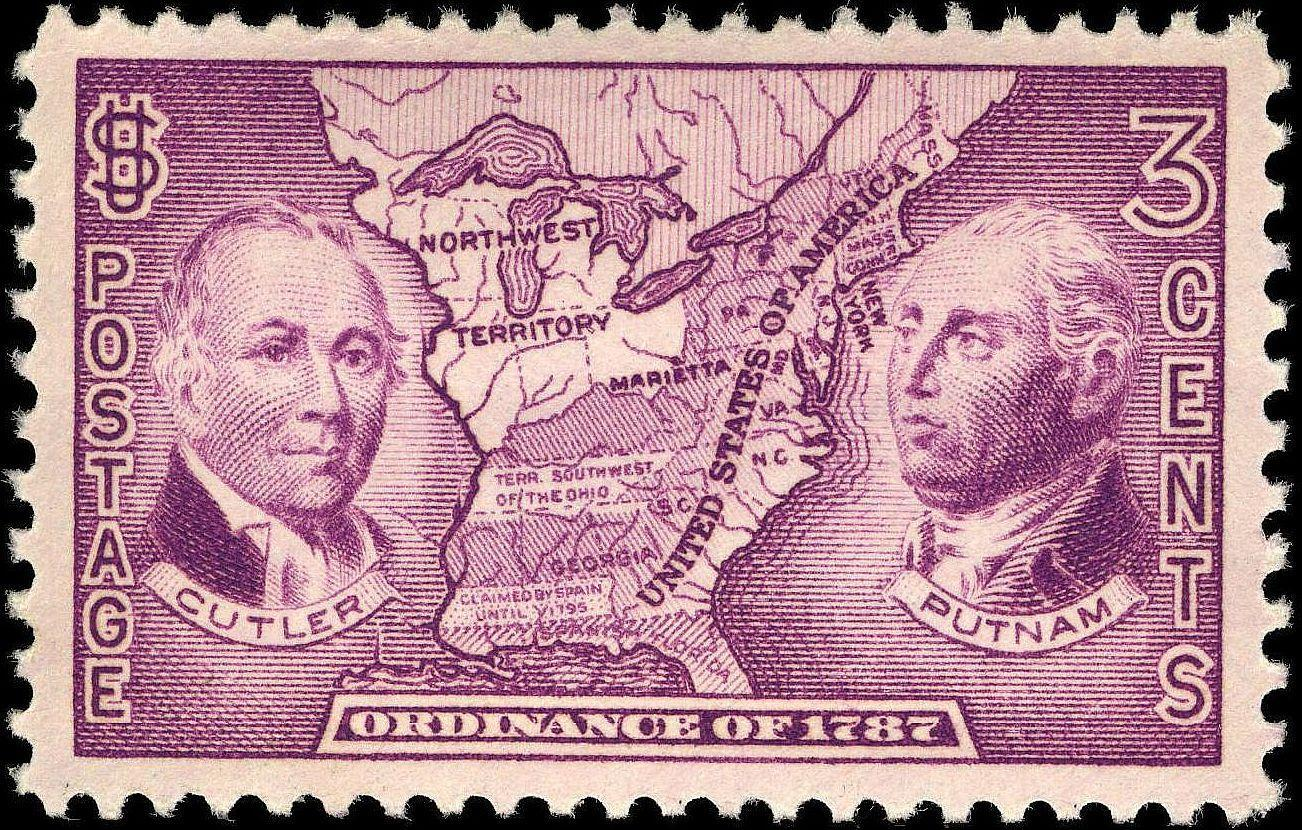
Ordinance of 1787 1937 issue

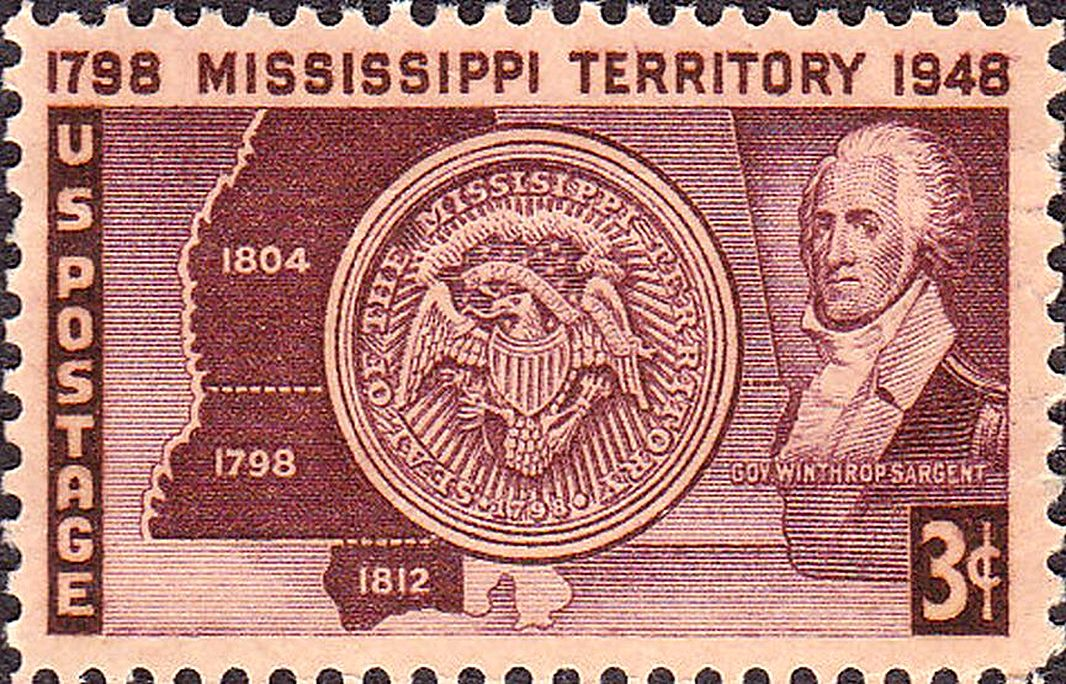
Mississippi Territory 1948 issue

=== Manifest destiny ===
The first expansion beyond Treaty of Paris borders occurred with the Louisiana Purchase from France in 1803 under President Thomas Jefferson, known as the architect of the Louisiana Purchase. His portrait is featured on the second stamp of the Louisiana Purchase Exposition issue. This issue of 1904 also featured a 10-cent stamp with an outline of the Louisiana Purchase territory superimposed over a political map of the United States. The Louisiana Purchase sesquicentennial 1953 featured James Monroe, Robert R. Livingston and François Barbé-Marbois, "signing the Louisiana Transfer, Paris 1803".

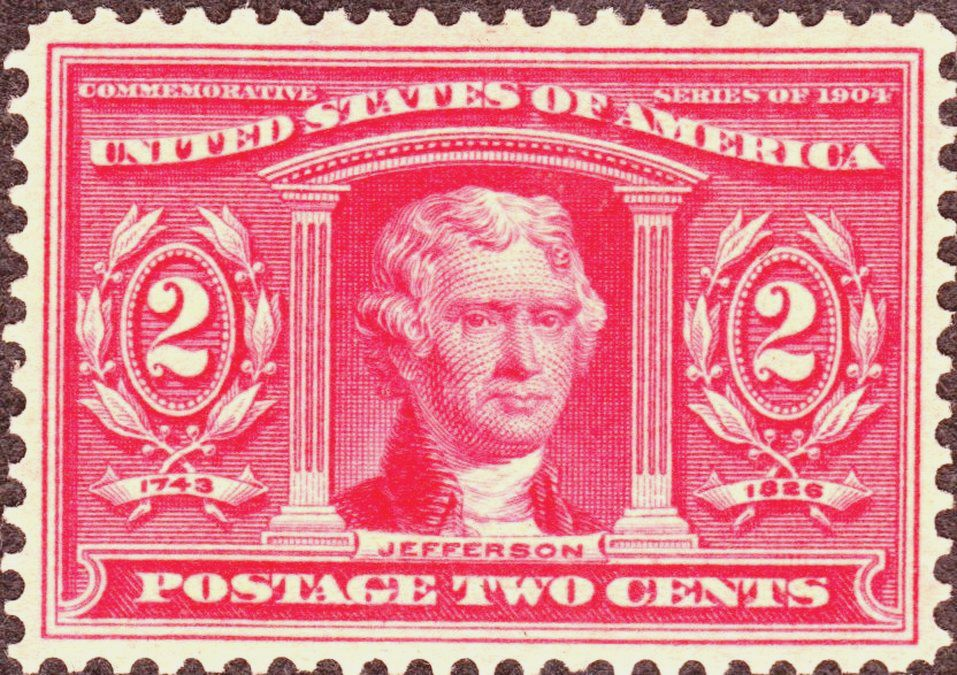
Thomas Jefferson 1904 issue

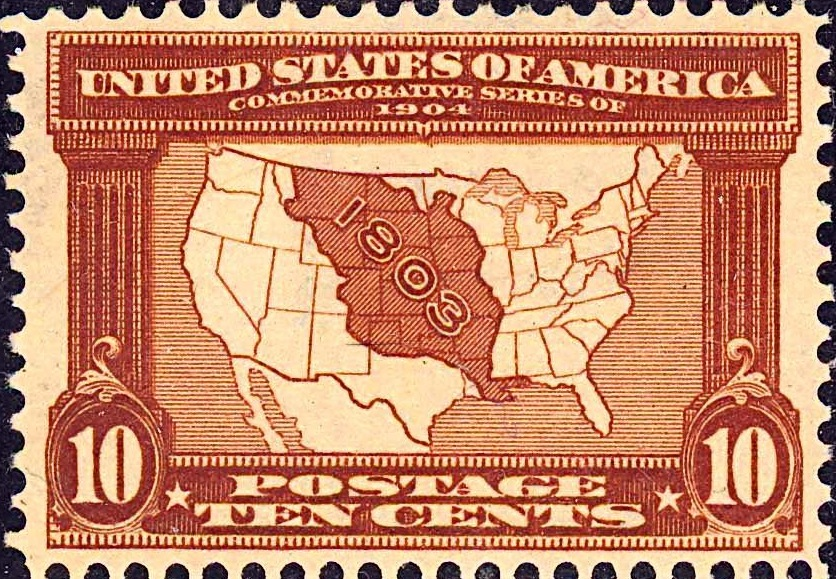
Louisiana Purchase map 1904 issue

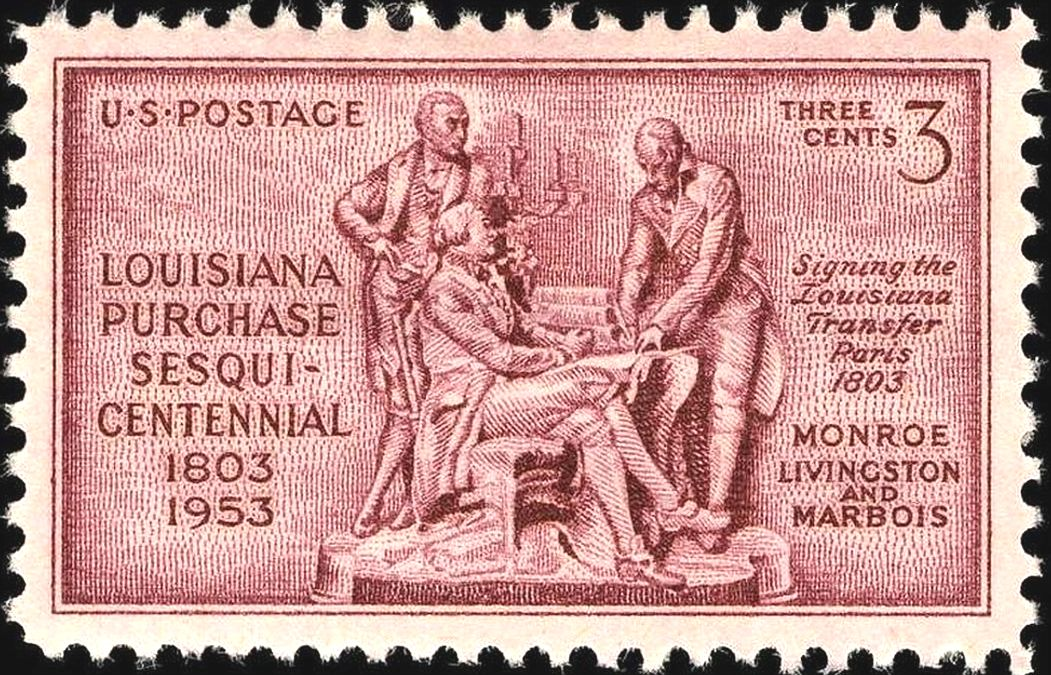
Louisiana Purchase Treaty signing 1953 issue

A map of the 1822 Florida Territory was pictured on the statehood commemoration from its original state seal on its 100th anniversary by a 3-cent stamp on March 3, 1945. The gates of St. Augustine are pictured on the left and the State Capitol in Tallahassee on the right. Texas was annexed in 1845 by Republic of Texas petition to the United States under the presidency of James K. Polk. The 100th anniversary of Texas statehood was commemorated by a 3-cent stamp on December 29, 1945. The Republic of Texas was established in 1836 in the aftermath of a rebellion against Mexican authority. Texas annexation to the U.S. was resisted by Northerners opposed to the expansion of slavery. But during the Polk Administration, Texas was annexed as a slave state. This led directly to the Mexican–American War as Mexico moved to protect its territorial claims from American expansion.

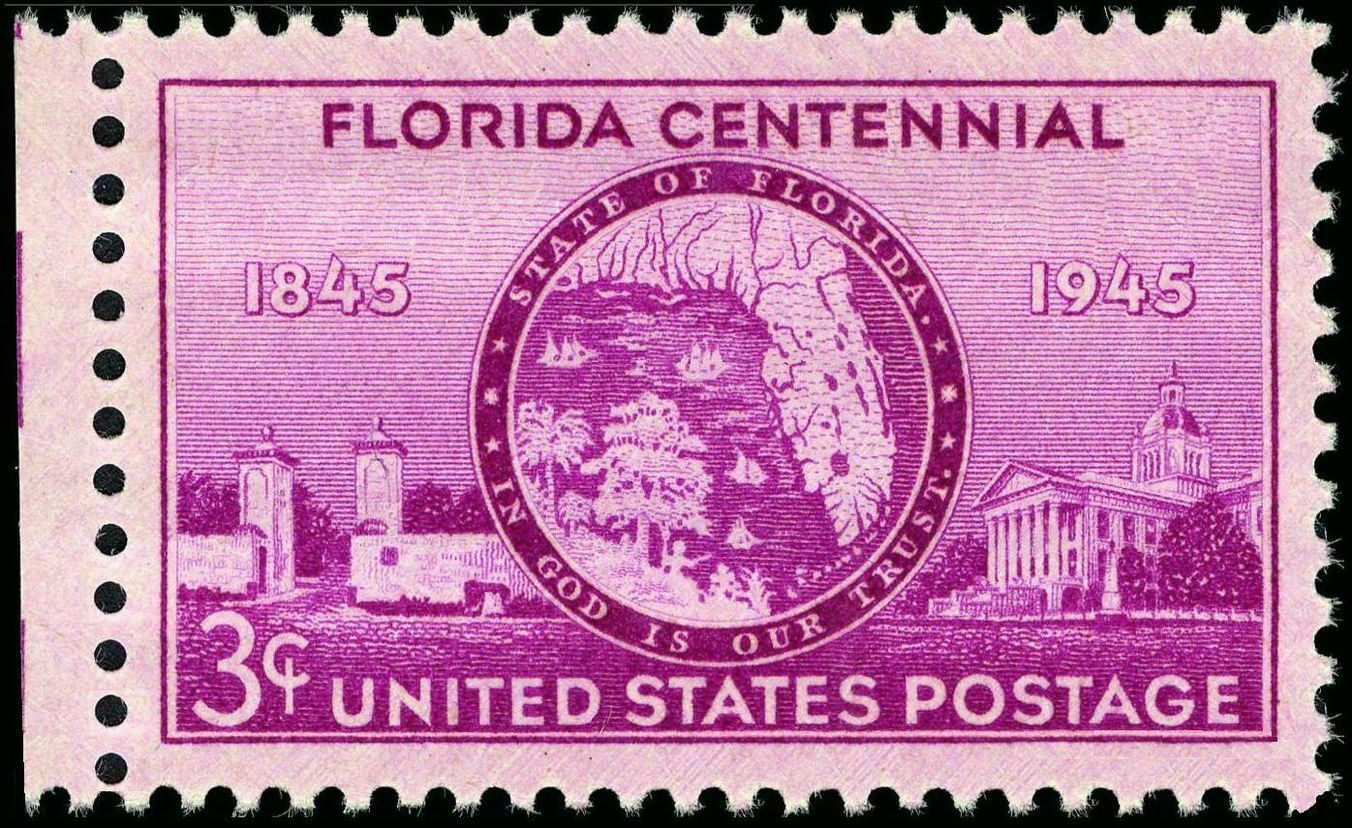
Florida Territory 1945 issue

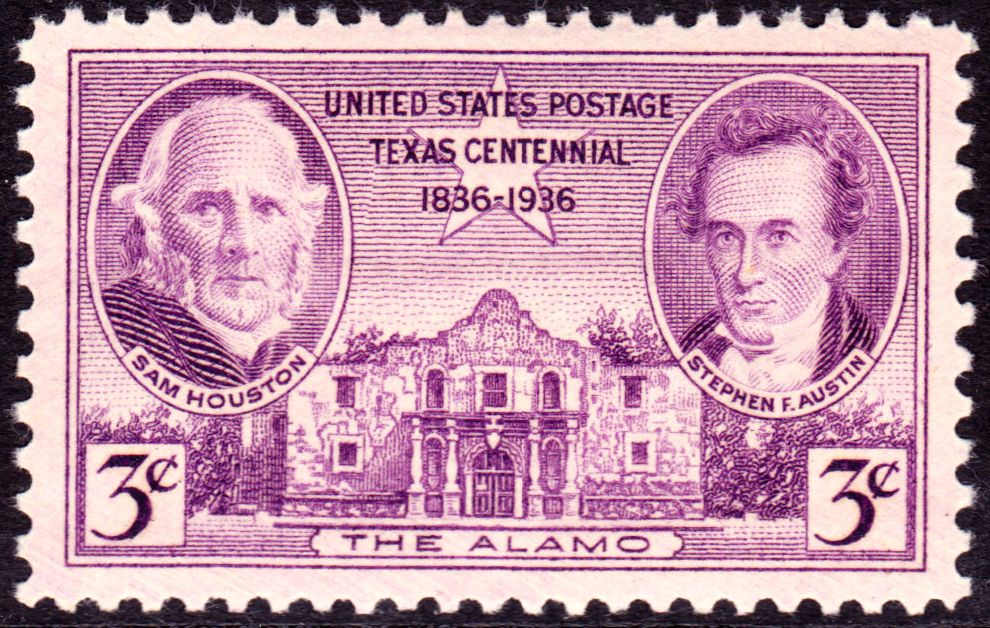
Texas independence 1936 issue

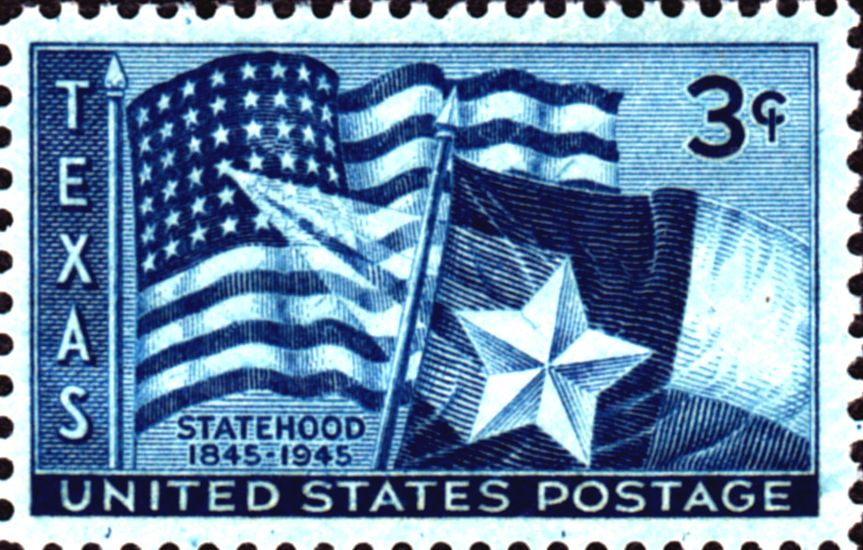
Texas statehood 1945 issue

The Mexican–American war begun under President James Polk had three distinct operational phases. The Kearny Expeditions through Mexican territory to reach the Pacific, the invasion of Mexico from the north under Zachary Taylor, and the invasion of Mexico from Vera Cruz under Winfield Scott to capture Mexico City. A 3-cent stamp, "Kearny Expedition" was issued October 16, 1946, to commemorate the 100th anniversary of the Col. Stephen Watts Kearny expedition in New Mexico during the MexicanAmerican War. In Santa Fe he established American authority with himself as military governor. He commanded several expeditions through western territories, and in California he was engaged in several battles and was again military governor. The 2-cent Army stamp of January 15, 1937, shows Andrew Jackson (left) and Winfield Scott a hero of the Mexican War, leading a campaign from Vera Cruz to Mexico City. Following the Peace Treaty of Guadalupe-Hidalgo, the Mexican Cession turned over to the U.S. territory stretching west to the Pacific Ocean.

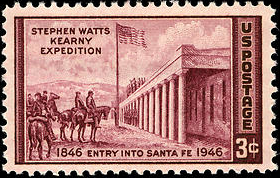
Kearny Expedition 1946 issue

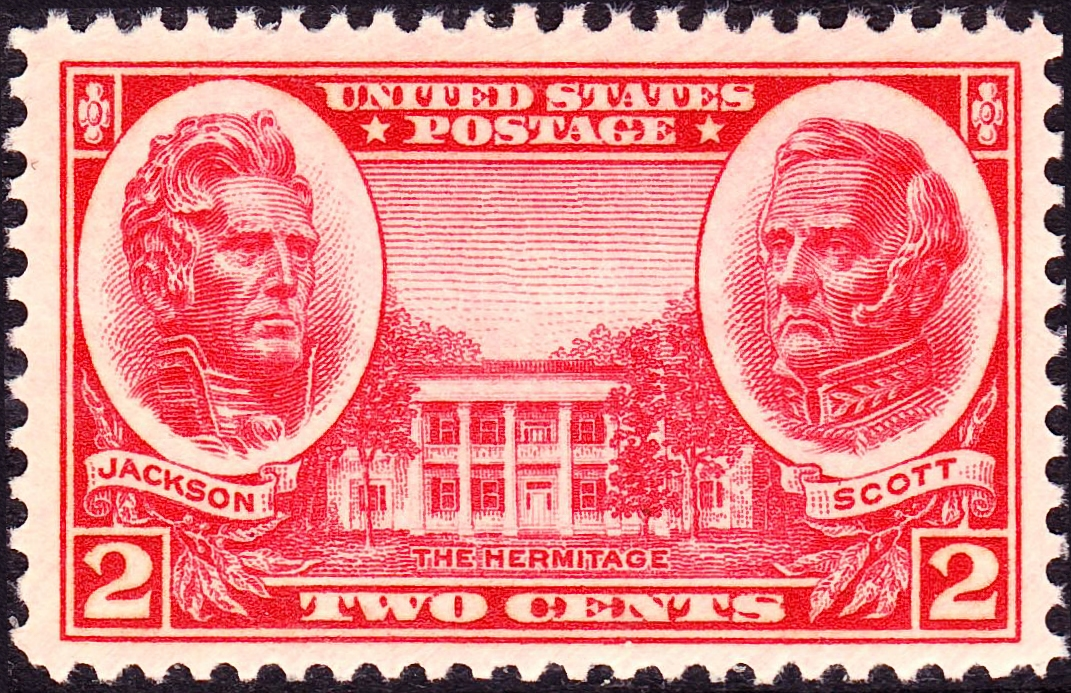
Winfield Scott (r.), the Mexican War 1937 issue

The Oregon Territory dispute was settled by the Oregon Treaty between the U.S. and Great Britain in 1846 under President Polk. The Oregon Territory was commemorated on its 100th anniversary with a 3-cent stamp on July 14, 1936. It comprised the present states of Oregon, Washington, Idaho, and parts of Montana and Wyoming. The stamp features a map of the Territory, including a trace of the Oregon Trail, flanked by a Native American scene and a covered wagon train. A 3-cent commemorative of the 100th anniversary of the Gadsden Purchase issued December 30, 1953. The U.S. bought the Gadsden Purchase (1854) from Mexico. It amounted to 29,670 square miles which later became parts of Arizona and New Mexico. With the Gadsden Purchase, the contiguous territory which would become the "lower forty-eight" contiguous states of the United States was complete.

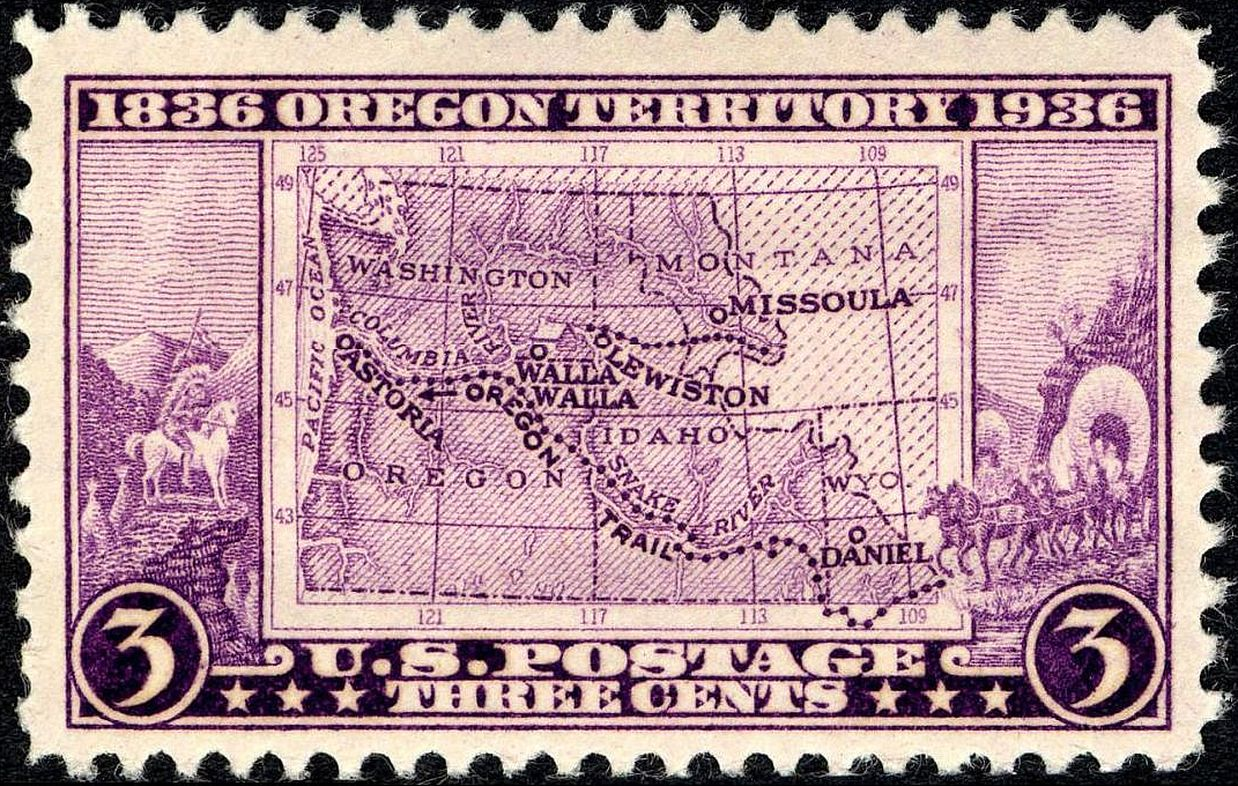
Oregon Territory 1836 1936 issue

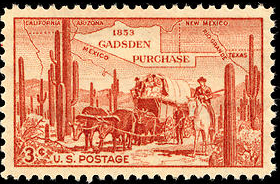
Gadsden Purchase 1953 issue

The Alaska–Yukon–Pacific Exposition commemorated the nation's northwest territory on the 10th anniversary of the 1897 Klondike Gold rush and the 40th anniversary of the 1867 Alaska Purchase. Delayed from 1907 to 1909 to avoid competing with the Jamestown Exposition. Secretary of State William H. Seward is shown. He negotiated the $8 million purchase of Alaska from Russia. The popular press in 1867 referred to the purchase as "Seward's Folly," but by 1909 the importance of this acquisition was recognized.

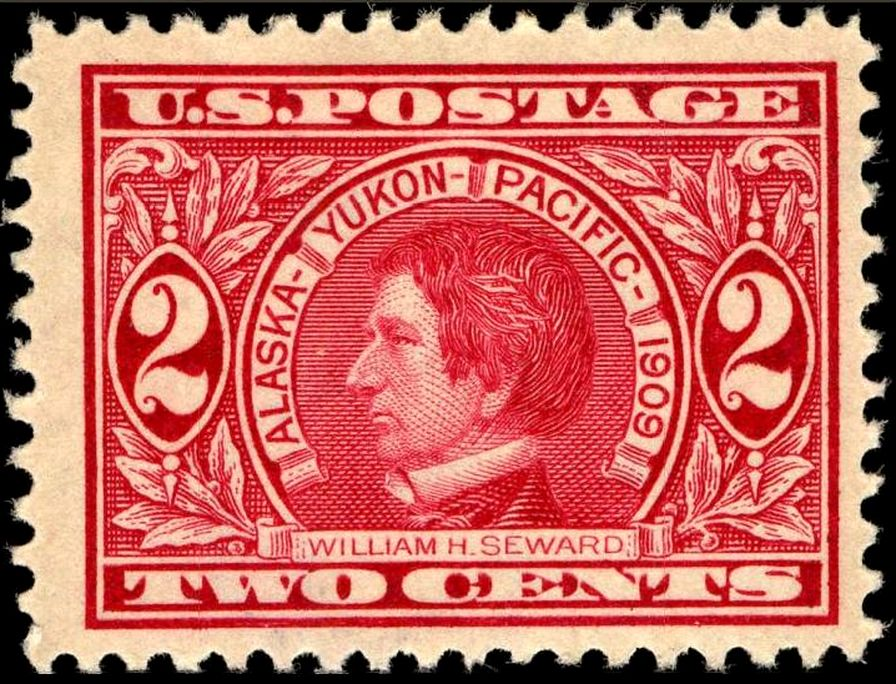
Alaska Purchase 1909 issue

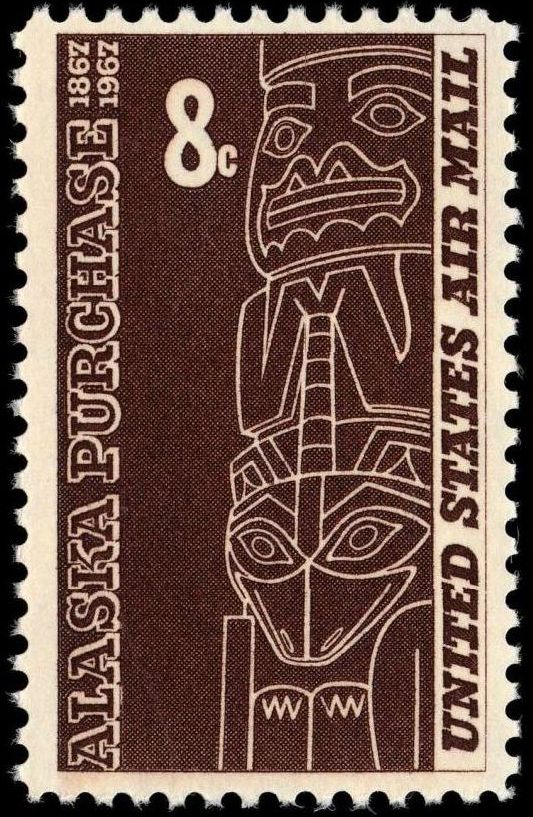
Alaska Purchase 1967 Airmail issue

=== Insular territories ===
The U.S. Postal Department issued four 3-cent stamps commemorating Insular Territories: Hawaii, Alaska, Puerto Rico and U.S. Virgin Islands over the three months of October to December 1937. The first was to honor the Territory of Hawaii acquired in 1898. It showed the statue of King Kamehameha I, unifier of the Hawaiian Islands, at the Iolani Palace in Honolulu. The second honored Alaska which was purchased in 1867. The stamp pictured snow-covered Denali with a farm and a village to symbolize modern development in the territory. Alaska and Hawaii territories were admitted as states in 1959.

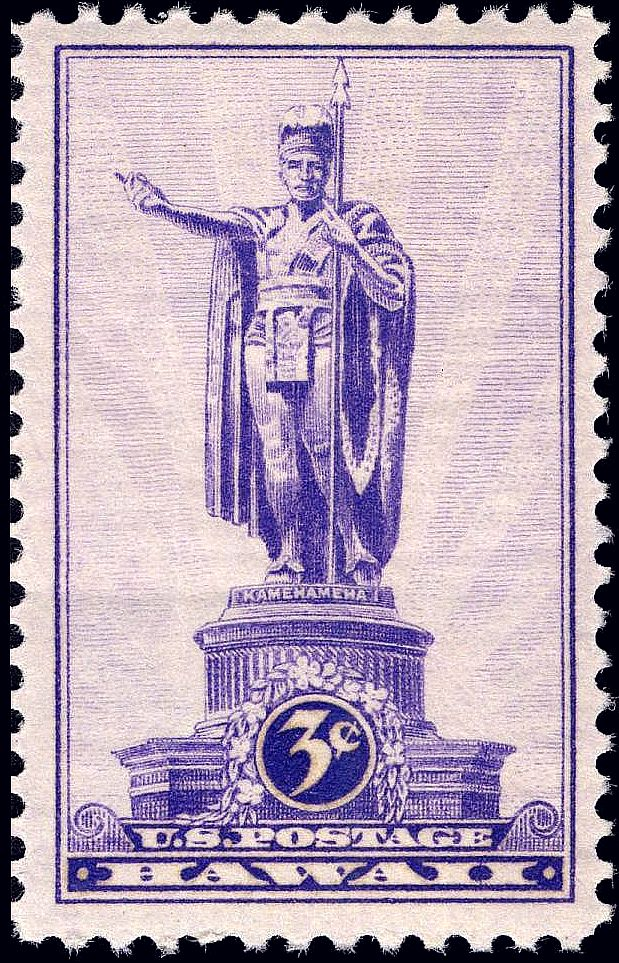
Kamehameha I Statue Hawaii Territory

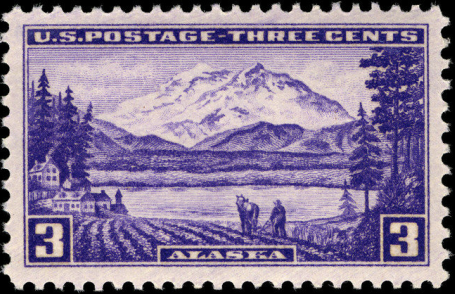
Denali Alaska Territory

The third stamp honored Puerto Rico featuring 'La Fortaleza', the Spanish Governor's Palace. Puerto Rico was ceded by Spain in an 1898 treaty ending the Spanish American War. Though some thought the stamp was limited to Puerto Rico, it was valid throughout the U.S. and its territories. The final stamp was in honor of the U. S. Virgin Islands, which was purchased from Denmark in 1917. The stamp displays a view of Charlotte Amalie, capital city of the territory.

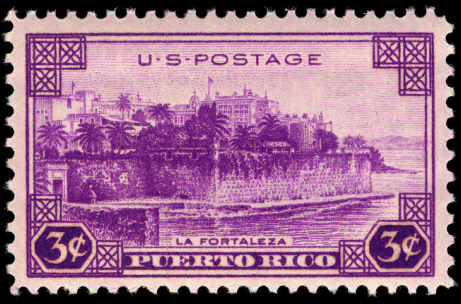
La Fortaleza Puerto Rico

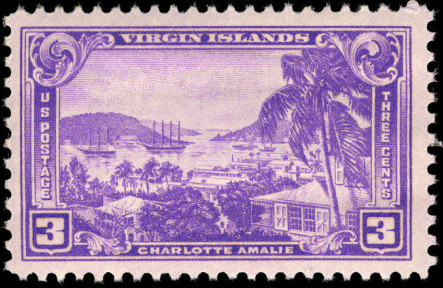
Charlotte Amalie U.S. Virgin Islands

In the "Flags of our nation series" 2008–2012, five territorial flags were featured. The 42-cent denominations were the American Samoa Flag showing island peaks and trees, issued June 14, 2008, and the Guam Flag was illustrated with fish and tropicbird, issued September 2, 2008. Forever stamps included Northern Marianas Flag picturing a palm tree issued 2011, Puerto Rico Flag illustrated by a bird issued 2011, and Virgin Islands Flag showing a sailfish issued 2012. Images of each flag can be seen at Arago online, National Postal Museum at the Smithsonian Institution on the following links: American Samoa Flag, Guam Flag, Northern Marianas Flag stamp, Puerto Rico Flag, U.S. Virgin Islands Flag.

The U.S. Postal Department also used general issue stamps with the territorial name overprinted, such as PUERTO RICO, CUBA, GUAM, PHILIPPINES or CANAL ZONE. Cuba and the Philippines were granted independence, and the Canal Zone was returned to Panama.

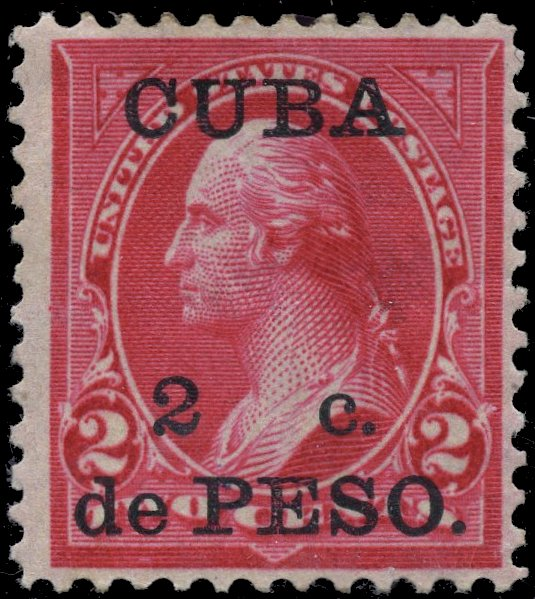
Cuba overprint 1899 issue

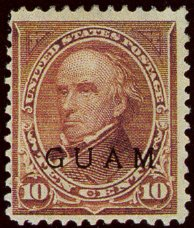
Guam overprint 1899 issue

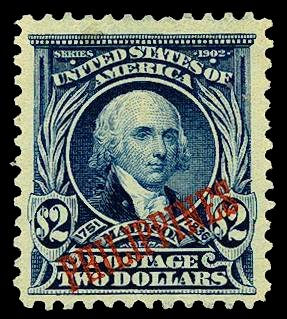
Philippines overprint 1903 issue

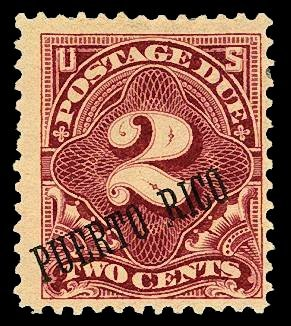
Puerto Rico overprint 1899 issue

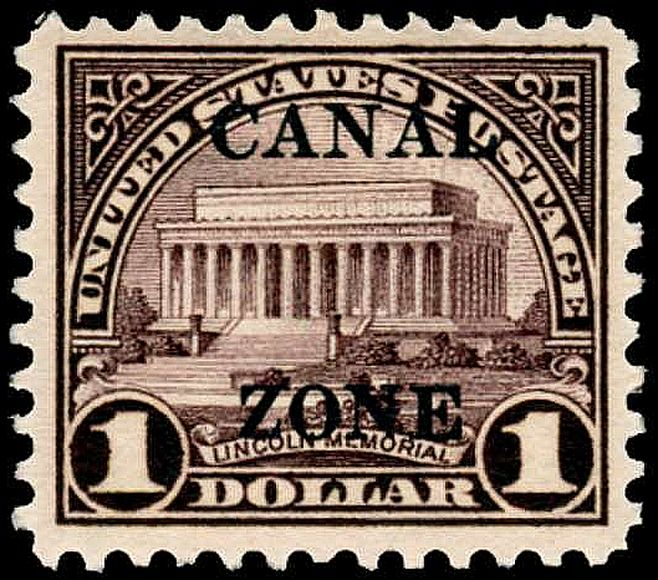
Canal Zone overprint 1925 issue

Alternatively, the U.S. issued a 1932 'United States of America' stamp for 18 centavos in the Philippines, 1930 stamps for use in Guam only designated 'Guam Guard Mail, or 1952 'Ryukyus' stamp for 100 yen in Okinawa. The Philippines was granted independence, the Ryukyus were returned to Japan.

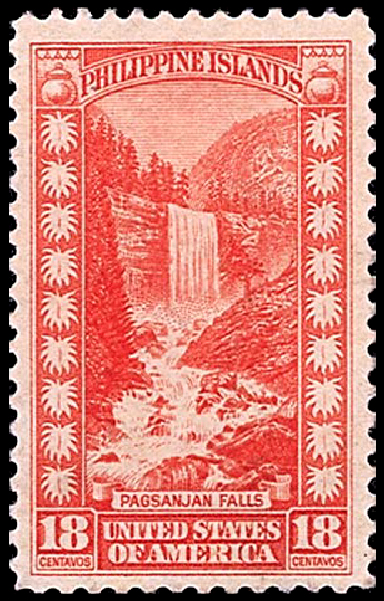
Pagsanjan Falls, PI 1932 issue

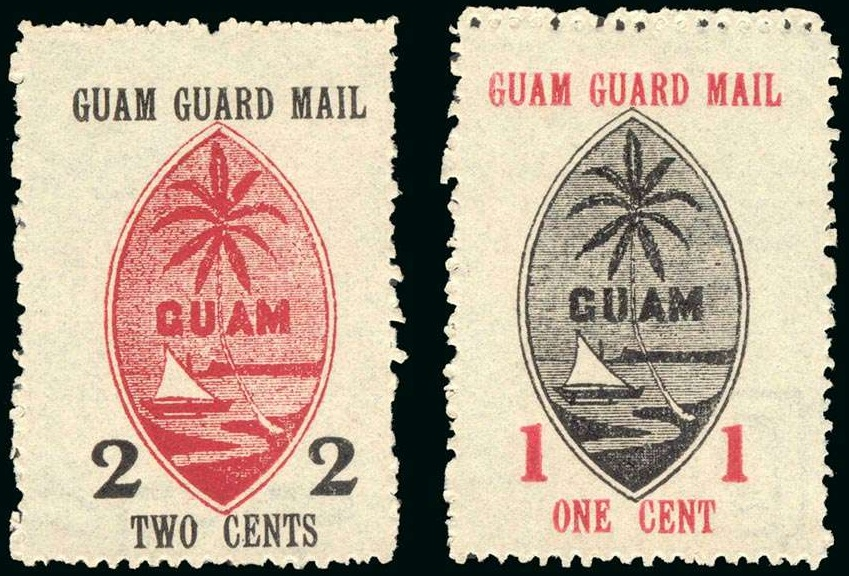
Guam guard mail GU 1930 issue

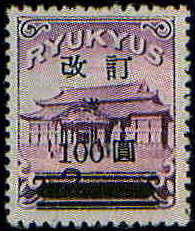
Ryukyus 1952 issue

Panama Canal has been featured on several U. S. commemorative stamps, as well as on Panama's own postage. The territory was returned to Panama.

The Panama Canal is represented by the Pedro Miguel Locks in the Panama–Pacific Exposition issue. An estimated 500 million of these 2-cent stamps were printed and issued to the public in a first release in 1913 with perforations 12, and a second in 1914 in perforations 10.

The Panama Canal opening was commemorated on its 25th anniversary with a 3-cent stamp issued on August 15, 1939. The stamp shows a steamship passing through the Gaillard Cut, President Theodore Roosevelt on the left promoted the canal and General George W. Goethals on the right was chief engineer and first governor of the Panama Zone.

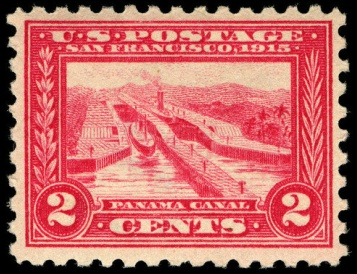
Pedro Miguel Locks, Panama Canal 1913 issue

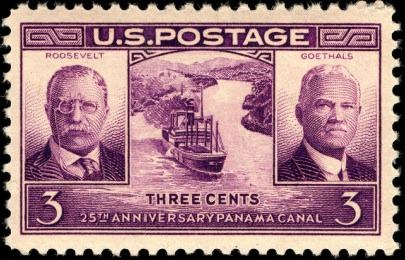
Galliard Cut, Panama Canal 1939 issue

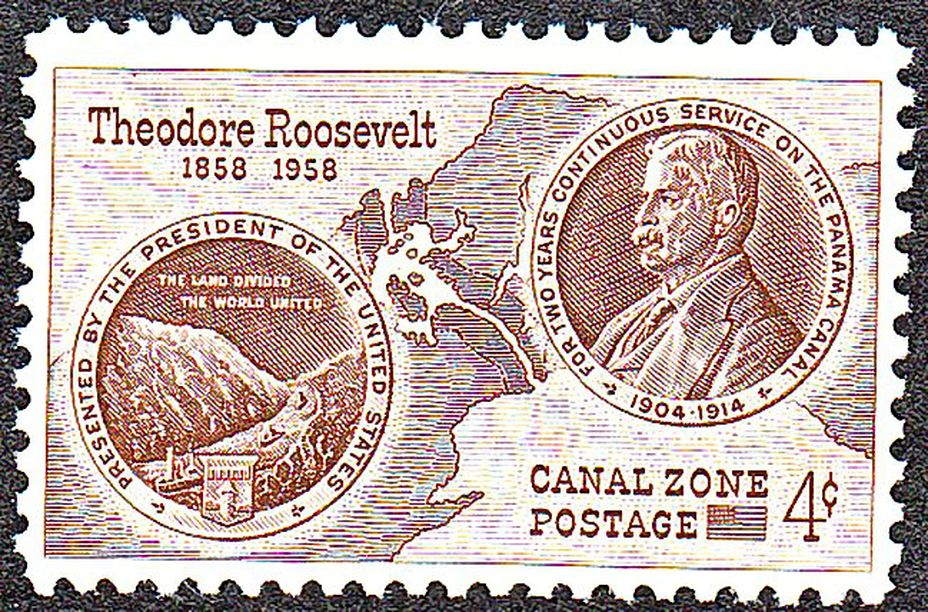
Canal Zone postage 1958 issue

== Filling in settlement ==
=== Eastern growth ===
East of the Mississippi River. Founding of the Jamestown Settlement by the Virginia Company was commemorated on the 300th anniversary by 2-cent stamp in late 1907. It was the first permanent British colony in America following the 1587 failure of the Roanoke NC settlement.

The 2-cent "Walloons landing at Fort Orange" New Netherland was issued on May 1, 1924, to commemorated the 300th anniversary of settlement in New York. Walloons from the south of Belgium had been persecuted for their Protestant beliefs.

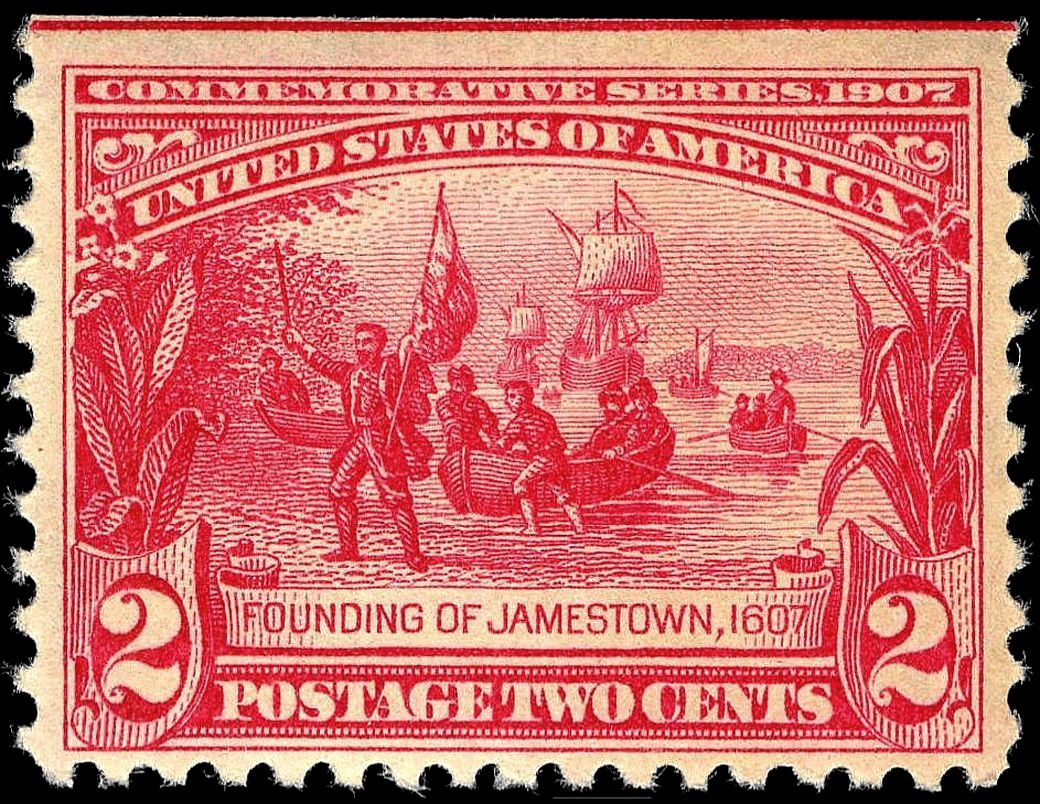
Jamestown, Virginia 1907 issue

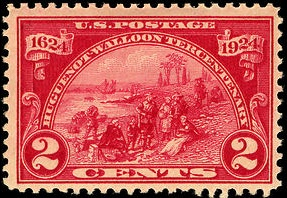
Fort Orange, New York 1924 issue

The founding of the Massachusetts Bay Colony, commemorated on its 300th anniversary in 1930, was the culmination of a process begun ten years earlier with the signing of the Mayflower Compact: an exercise in representative democracy that stands as the first major political event of American history.

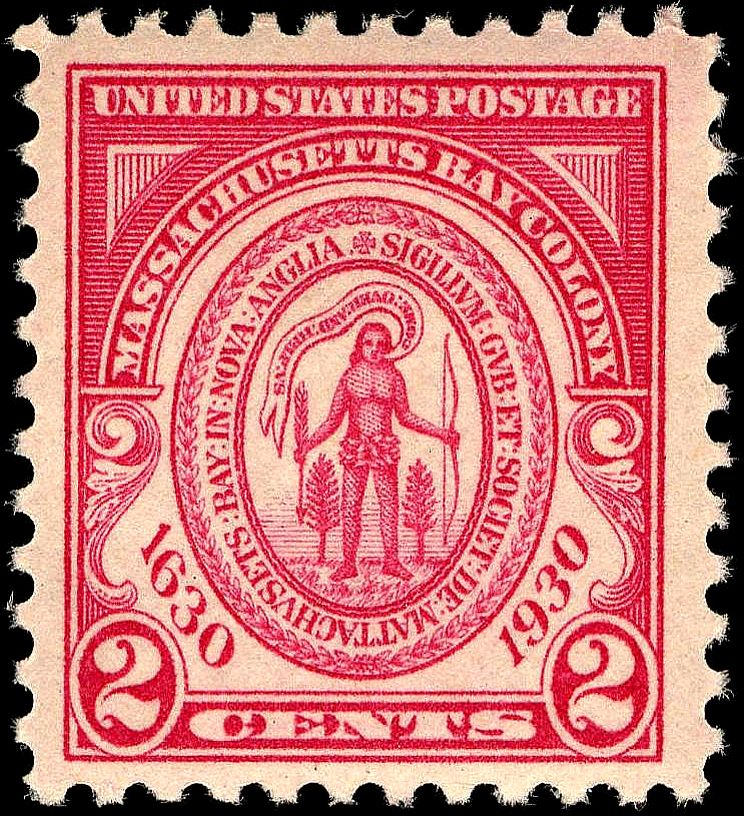
Massachusetts Bay Colony, 1930 issue

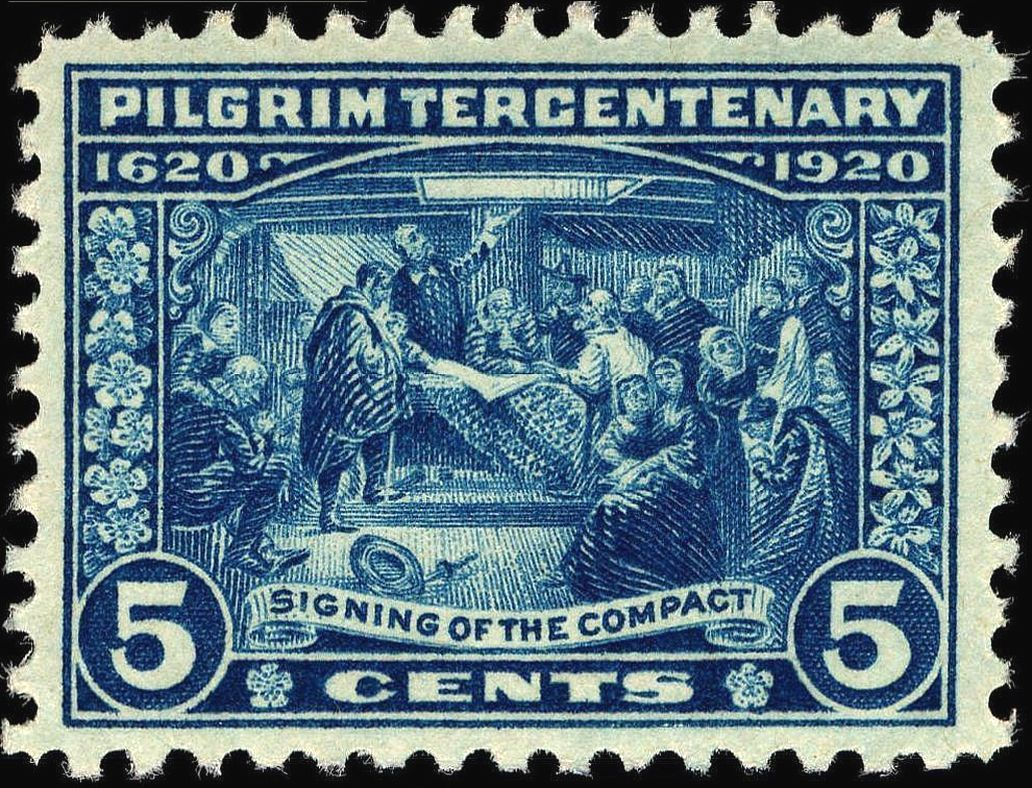
Plymouth, Massachusetts 1920 issue

Pilgrims landing and settlement at Plymouth, Massachusetts was commemorated with a 6-cent stamp marking on the 350th anniversary, November 21, 1970.

William Penn was commemorated with a 3-cent stamp issued October 24, 1932 on the 250th anniversary of Penn's 1682 landing in the New World. He founded of the colony of Pennsylvania.

James Oglethorpe was honored on a 3-cent stamp on February 12, 1933. It was the 200th anniversary of his landing at Savannah. Oglethorpe established the British settlement which led to the creation of the colony of Georgia.

Roger Williams led a group of followers to Providence, Rhode Island. The settlement was commemorated with a 3-cent stamp on the 300th anniversary, May 4, 1936. The statue depicted stands near the State House. The state seal of Rhode Island is at lower left.

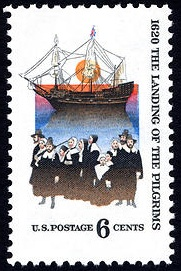
Pilgrims Landing, Massachusetts 1970 issue

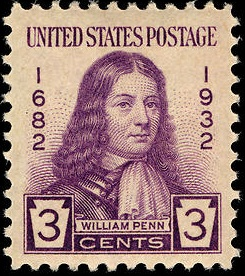
William Penn, Pennsylvania 1932 issue

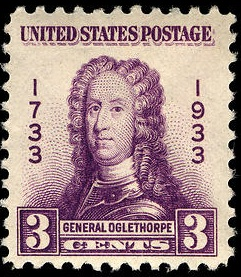
James Edward Oglethorpe, Georgia 1933 issue

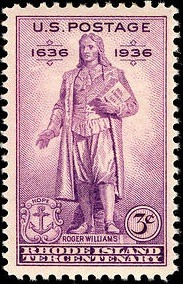
Roger Williams, Rhode Island 1936 issue

The Connecticut Charter of 1662's 300th anniversary was commemorated by a 3-cent stamp on April 26, 1935. The charter was granted by Charles II and hidden from the agents of James II under this tree considered sacred by the Indians of the area.

New York City founding was celebrated on the 300th anniversary with a 3-cent stamp on November 20, 1953. The foreground design is of New Amsterdam, with a Dutch ship at anchorage, the background shows the New York City skyline.

New Sweden colony of Swedes and Finns near Wilmington, Delaware, was commemorated on the 300th anniversary with a 3-cent stamp issued June 27, 1938. Sweden an expansionist power in the 17th century included Finland and much of Scandinavia.

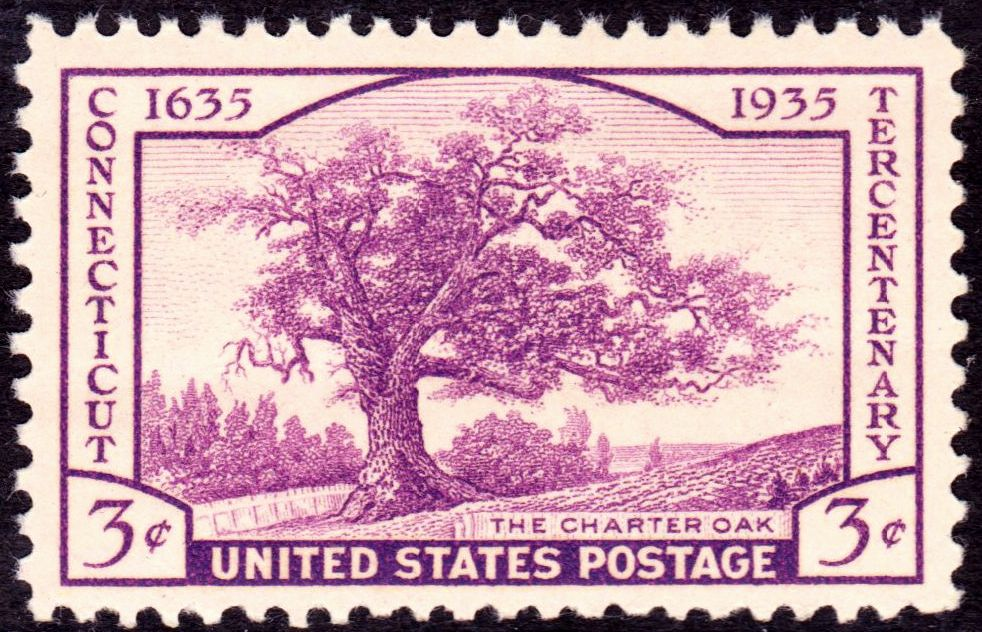
Charter Oak, Connecticut 1935 issue

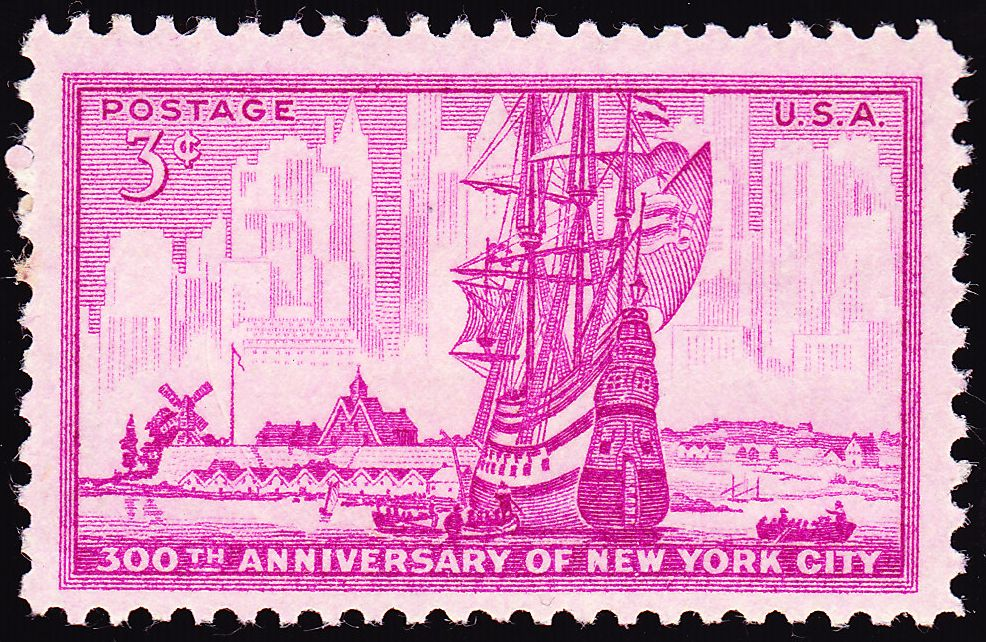
New Amsterdam, New York City 1949 issue

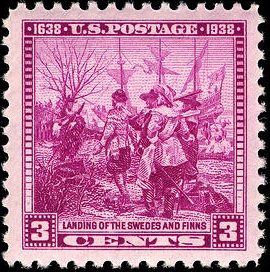
New Sweden, Delaware 1938 issue

The settlement of Annapolis, Maryland was commemorated with a 3-cent stamp issued March 23, 1949 on its 300th anniversary. It shows a map of the Annapolis area showing the water route from the Chesapeake Bay to the Severn River with the masted ship and long boat carrying Puritans ashore to the original settlement and natural resources.

The Province of Carolina and its Carolina Charter reaching from Virginia on the north to Florida on the south coast to coast was commemorated on its 300th anniversary on a 5-cent stamp issued April 6, 1963. The Charter linked the colonies to the human rights of Magna Carta.

Charlestown (Charleston) South Carolina settlement was commemorated on its 300th anniversary with a 6-cent stamp, on September 12, 1970. The city was named after King Charles II of England, as the first colonial city in South Carolina.

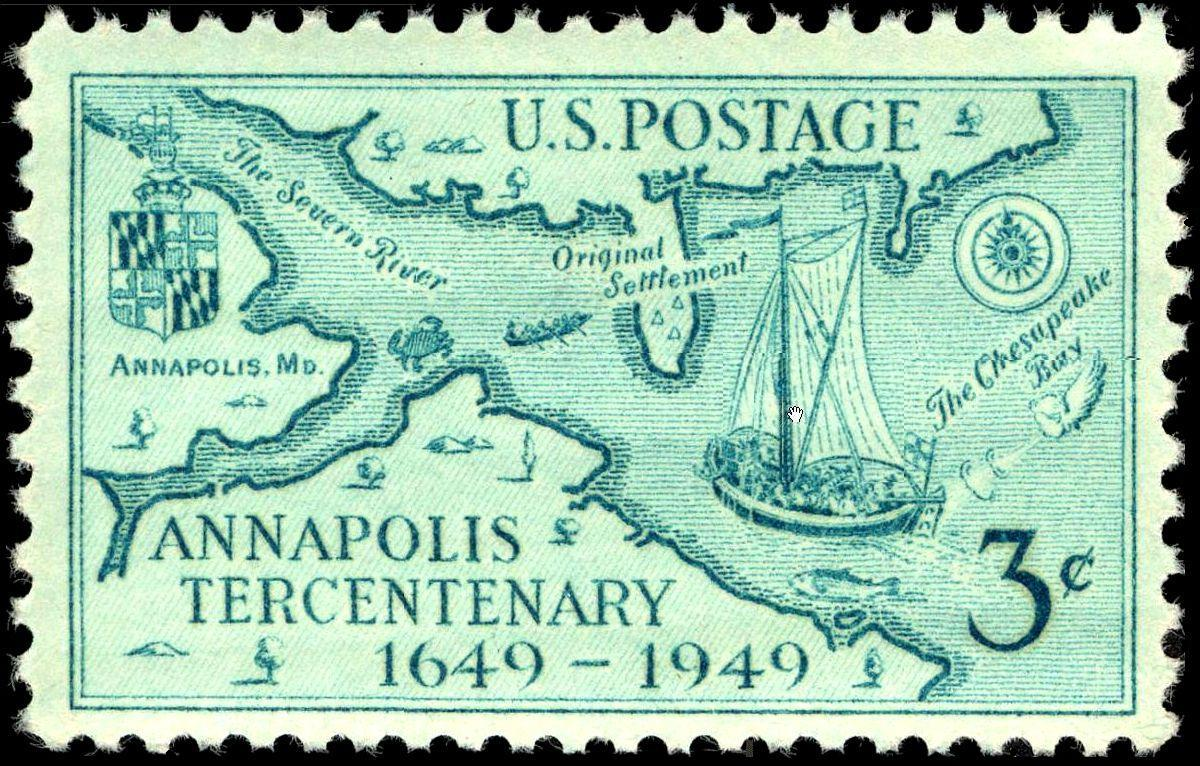
Annapolis, Maryland 1949 issue

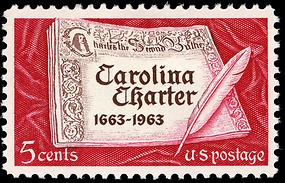
Carolina Charter, Carolinas 1963 issue

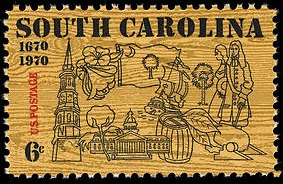
Charlestown, South Carolina 1970 issue

Vermont celebrated its 1777 independence as the Vermont Republic with a 2-cent stamp on August 3, 1927. Not one of the original thirteen states, it became the fourteenth. The vignette depicts a Green Mountain Boy from the Battle of Bennington dressed in buckskin with a rifle.

New Hampshire's founding was commemorated by a 3-cent stamp issued on June 21, 1955, celebrating the 150th anniversary of European discovery of "The Old Man of the Mountains" rock formation. The landmark setting is taken from Franconia Notch, NH, with the state motto, "Live Free or Die" below.

Kentucky's first settlement 200th anniversary was commemorated with a 10-cent stamp on June 15, 1974. Fort Harrod was the first permanent settlement founded by James Harrod. The scene depicts two settler's wagons approaching the fort.

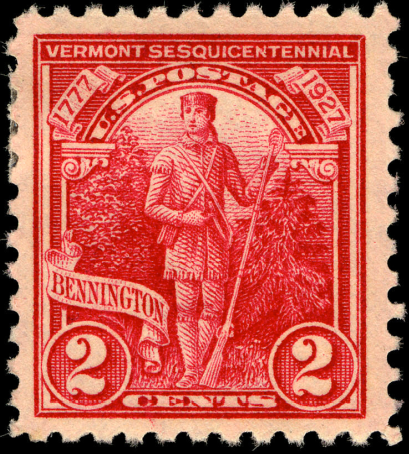
Vermont independence 1927 issue

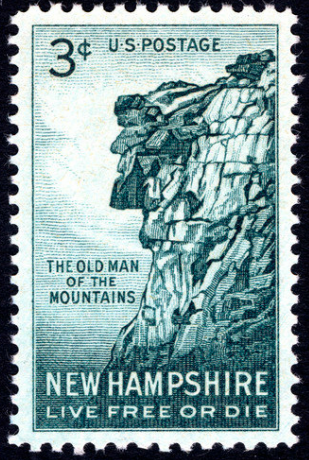
"Old Man of the Mountain", NH 1955 issue

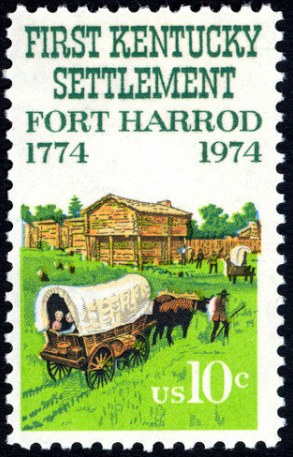
Fort Harrod, KY 1974 issue

Settlement of the Northwest Territory under the Ordinance of 1787 was celebrated on its 150th anniversary by a 3-cent stamp on July 15, 1938. The first permanent place was Marietta, Ohio. The Territory included Ohio, Indiana, Illinois, Michigan, Wisconsin, and part of Minnesota. The stamp features March Westward of the Nation, which stands in Marietta.

The 3-cent Indiana Territory sesquicentennial commemorative postage stamp was issued on July 4, 1950. It features a portrait of William Henry Harrison, the first governor of Indiana Territory and later the 9th President of the US. Indiana's first Capitol building is pictured to the right.

The San Agustín settlement was commemorated with a 5-cent stamp on the 400th anniversary issued August 28, 1965. It was the first continuous permanent European settlement in the new world. The stamp illustrates a Spanish explorer with Spain's royal banner in the background.

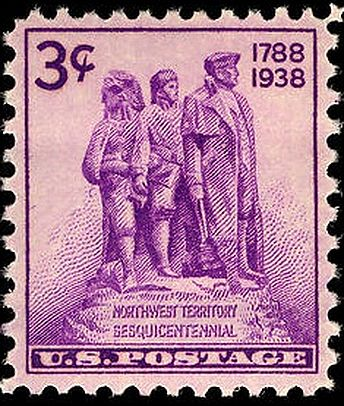
Marietta, Ohio 1938 issue

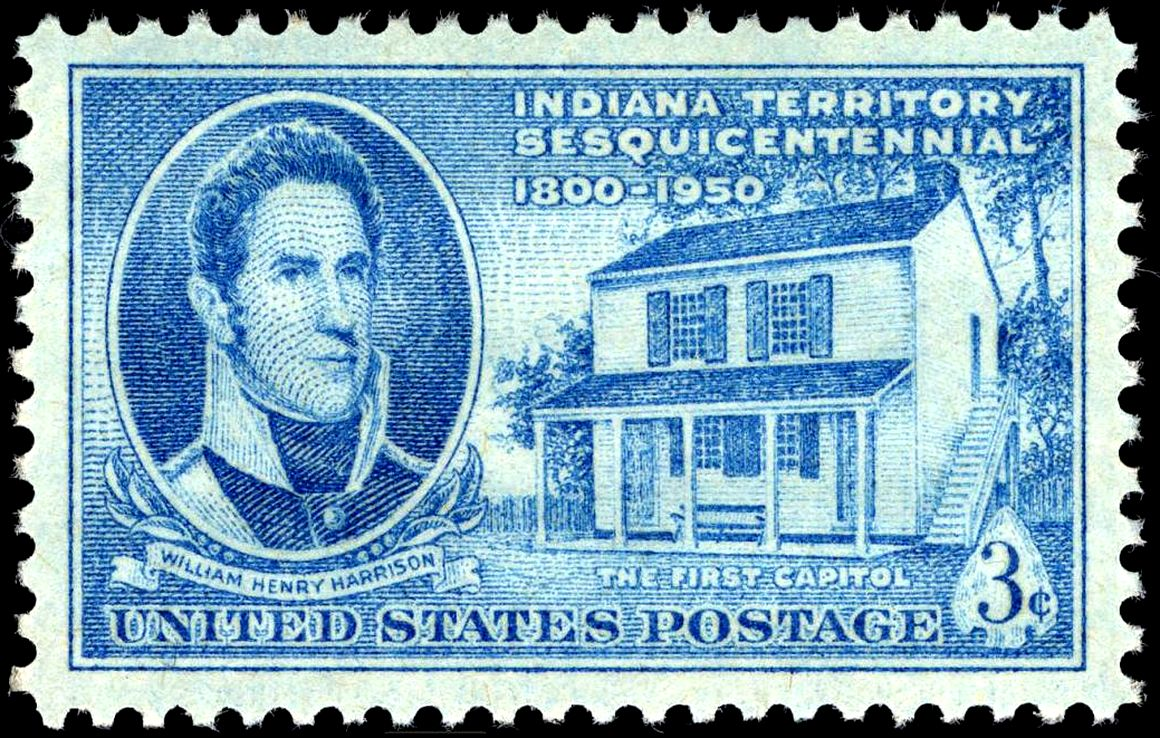
Indiana Territory 1950 issue

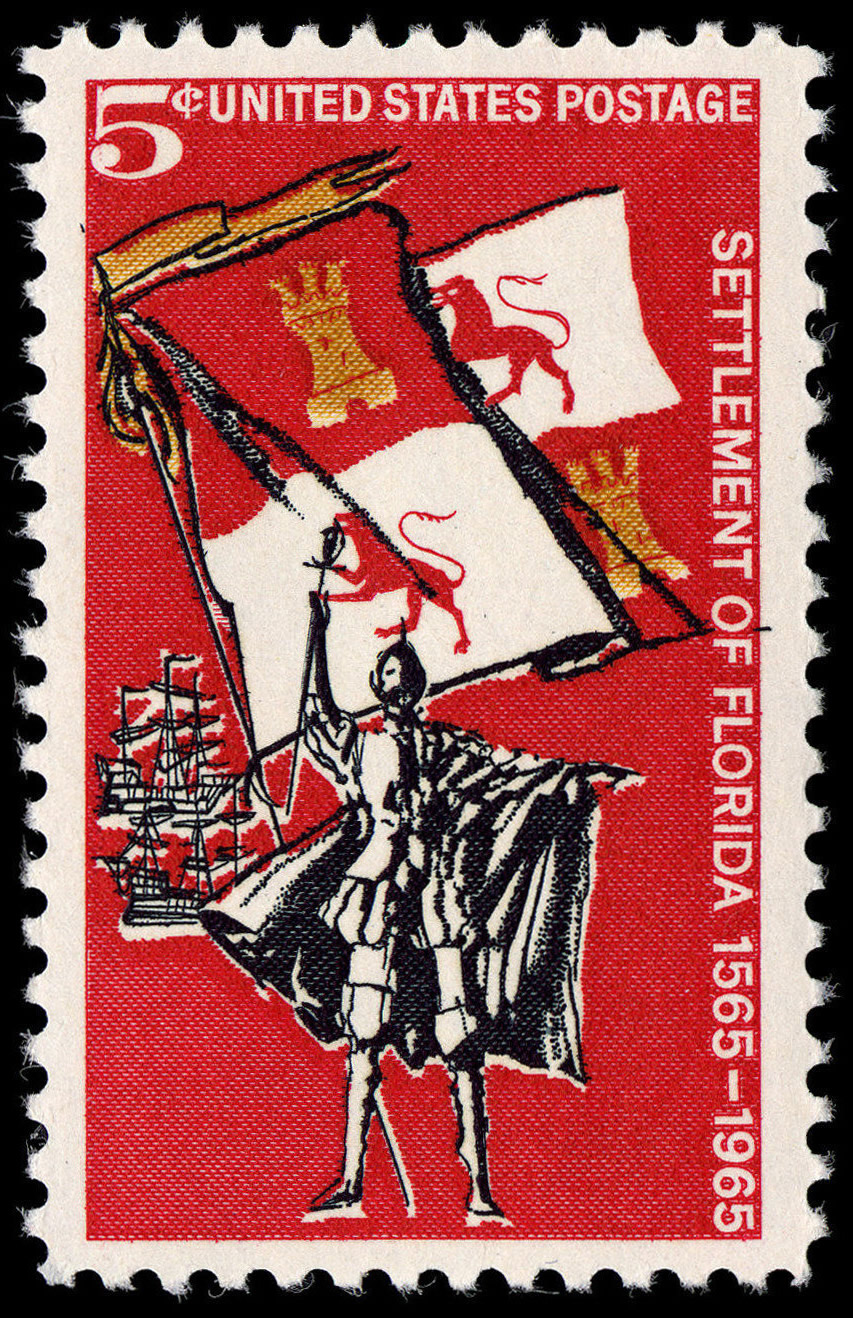
St. Augustine, Florida 1965 issue

=== Western growth ===
West of the Mississippi River. Antebellum United States saw further organization of territories.

Kansas Territory was commemorated on its 100th anniversary with a 3-cent stamp on May 31, 1954. The foreground depicts a field of wheat with a set of farm buildings. A wagon train of pioneers in light silhouette looms above. The stamp was issued in sheets of fifty, with 110,000,000 stamps authorized.

Nebraska Territory was commemorated on its 100th anniversary with a 3-cent stamp issued on May 7, 1954. The stamp is illustrated by "The Sower," a statue atop the Nebraska Capitol. Mitchell Pass is shown with Scotts Bluff dominating the right side.

Iowa Territory was commemorated on August 24, 1938, with a 3-cent stamp. It came from earlier parts of the Missouri, Michigan, and Wisconsin territories. The Iowa Territory included later Iowa, parts of Minnesota, and the Dakotas. Iowa achieved statehood in 1846. The Old Capitol in Iowa City, the territorial capital is shown.

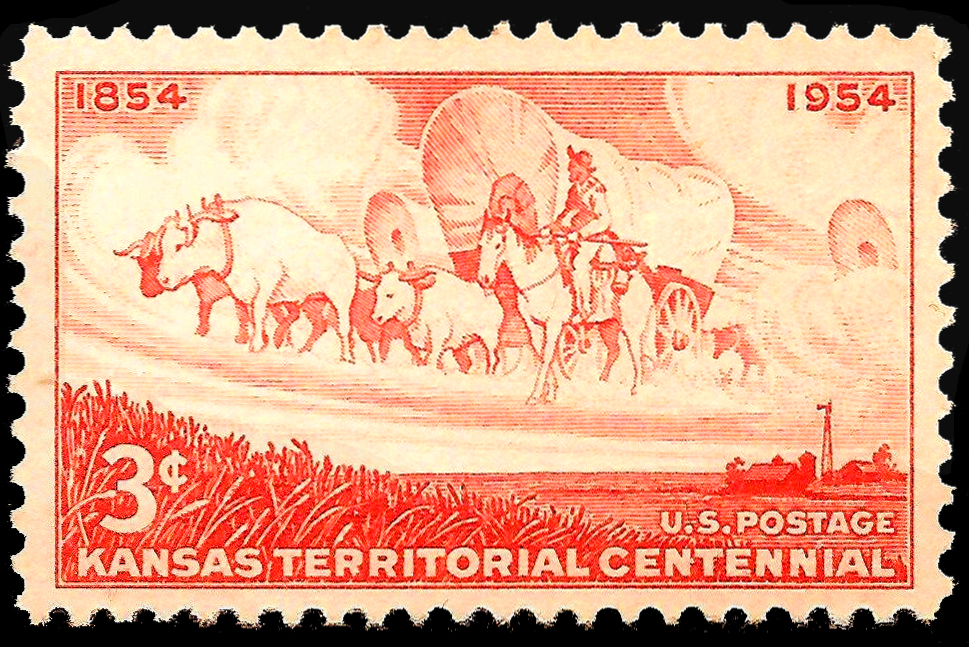
Kansas Territory 1954 issue

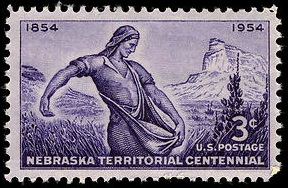
Nebraska Territory 1954 issue

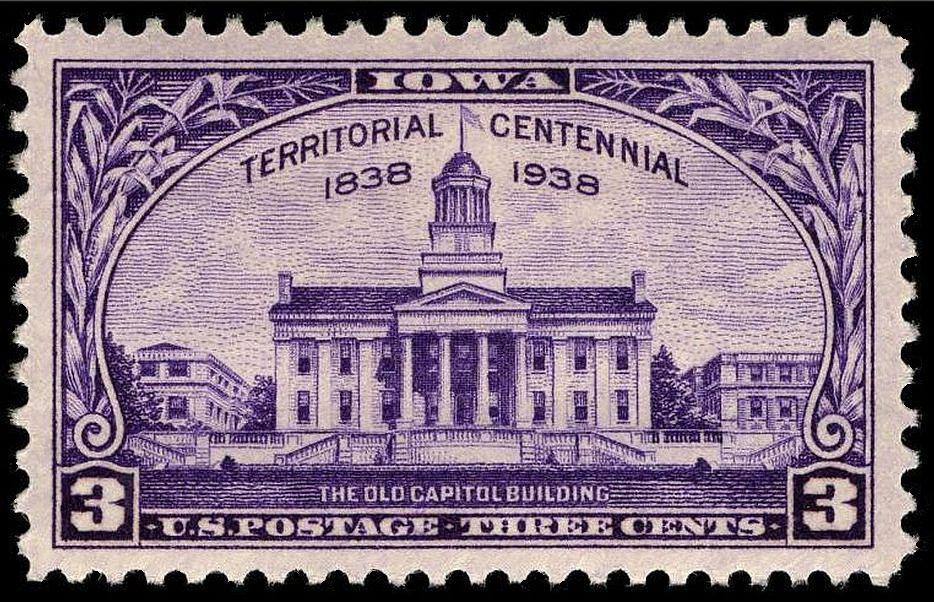
Iowa Territory 1938 issue

Fort Snelling, Minnesota was commemorated on its 150th anniversary with a 6-cent stamp on October 17, 1970. The fort was instrumental in opening the Northwest.

The emigration of Swedish pioneers to the American Midwest including the Wisconsin Territory was commemorated on the 100th anniversary by a 5-cent stamp on June 4, 1948. A Swedish pioneer is pictured with a covered wagon moving westward, framed by twelve stars, which represent the twelve midwestern states settled by Swedes, importantly Minnesota and Wisconsin.

Nebraska Territory settlement was expedited by the construction of Fort Kearny, Nebraska. Its 100th birthday commemoration was issued on September 22, 1948. The vignette shows Fort Kearny, with a pioneer group sculpture pictured above from the state's Capitol.

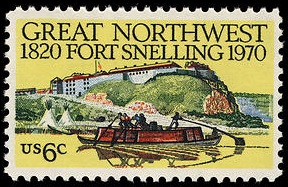
Fort Snelling, Minnesota 1970 issue

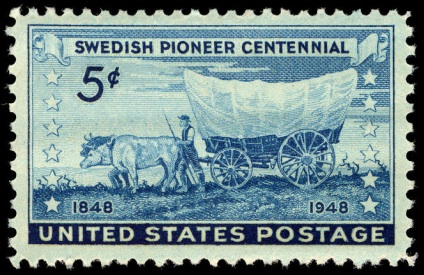
Swedish pioneer, Wisconsin Territory 1948 issue

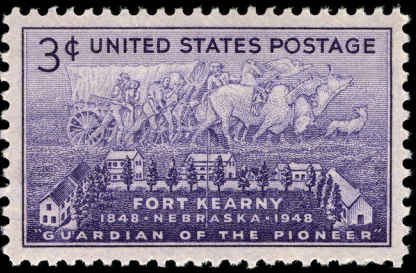
Ft. Kearny, Nebraska territory 1948 issue

The 6-cent Cherokee Strip, Oklahoma Territory, commemorative stamp was issued on October 15, 1968, on the 75th anniversary of the dramatic land rush into the northern part of the state. More than 100,000 homesteaders participated on run from the Kansas border on September 16, 1893. Forty thousand homesteads of 160 acres awaited successful claimants.

The centennial of Oklahoma Territory settlement by Native Americans of the Five Civilized Tribes was commemorated with a stamp issued on October 13, 1948, showing reproductions of the Five Great Seals of the Five Civilized Tribes of Oklahoma. Native Americans of the Five Civilized Tribes of Oklahoma - Cherokee, Chickasaw, Choctaw, Muscogee and Seminole - celebrated the centennial of their forced move of the Trail of Tears, an ordeal lasting from 1838 to 1848. The Centennial and stamp were meant to honor "their remarkable progress and achievements." From 1848 to 1948, the members of the five tribes in the Union of the Five Tribes made a 'March of Progress' in arts, letters, government and professional fields that contributed to the attainment of Statehood. Oklahoma was the home of almost one-half of the entire Indian population of the nation.

Minnesota Territory was commemorated on its 100th annivsary with a 3-cent stamp on March 3, 1949. The vignette features a westward-bound pioneer and a Red River ox cart. The Red River ox cart was a two-wheeled cart used by fur traders and pioneers, made entirely of wood was often constructed with buffalo sinew due to nail shortages. The Red River Ox Cart Trail extended from fur trading posts at St. Joseph in the Red River Valley to St. Paul, Minnesota.

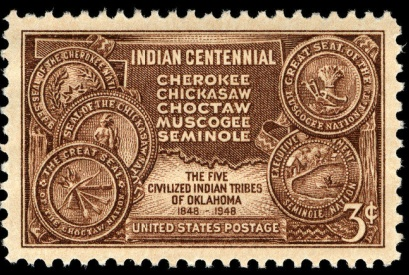
Five Civilized Nations, Oklahoma Terr. 1948 issue

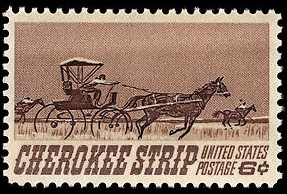
Cherokee Strip, Oklahoma 1968 issue

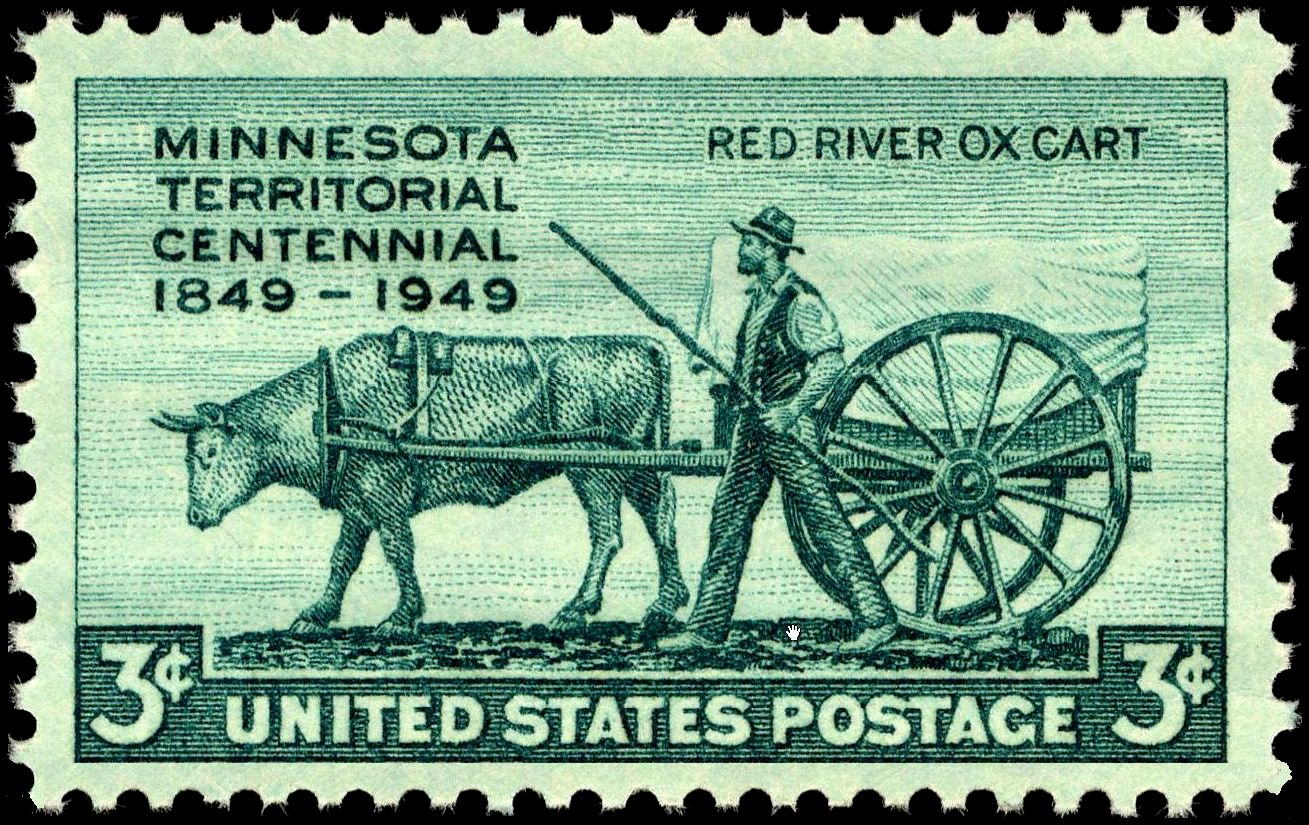
Minnesota Territory 1949 issue

The Oregon Territory stamp was issued August 14, 1948, on the Oregon Territory Centennial. The vignette shows a wagon on the Oregon Trail. Pictured is John McLoughlin, one of the most influential figures of the Pacific Northwest's fur trade and settlement periods, the 'Father of Oregon.' Also shown is Jason Lee who is credited with prominent leadership in a provisional government in the Oregon Country.

Following U.S. acquisition of the Utah Territory in the Mexican–American War, Mormons led by Brigham Young began settlement with his famous remark, "This is the place." The stamp shows settlers entering the valley of Great Salt Lake.

Washington Territory is commemorated on a 3-cent stamp issued on March 2, 1953. The stamp shows an early pioneer family overlooking a territorial scene including an expanse of water with mountain ranges rising in the distance. A centennial seal pictures a covered wagon drawn by oxen with a Native American seated in the foreground.

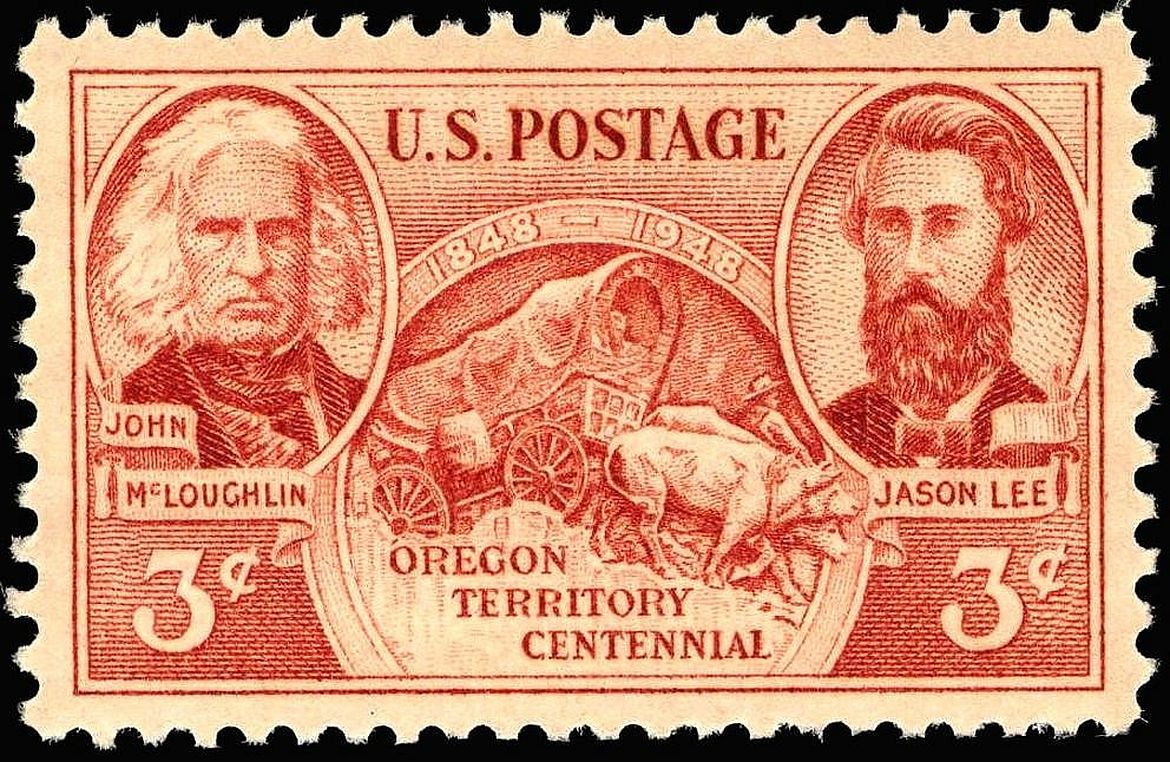
Oregon Territory 1848 1948 issue

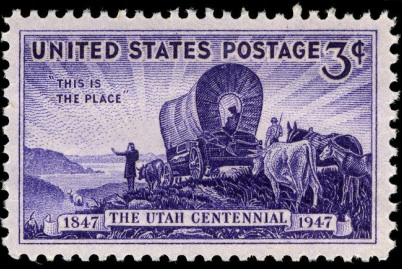
Utah territory 1947 issue

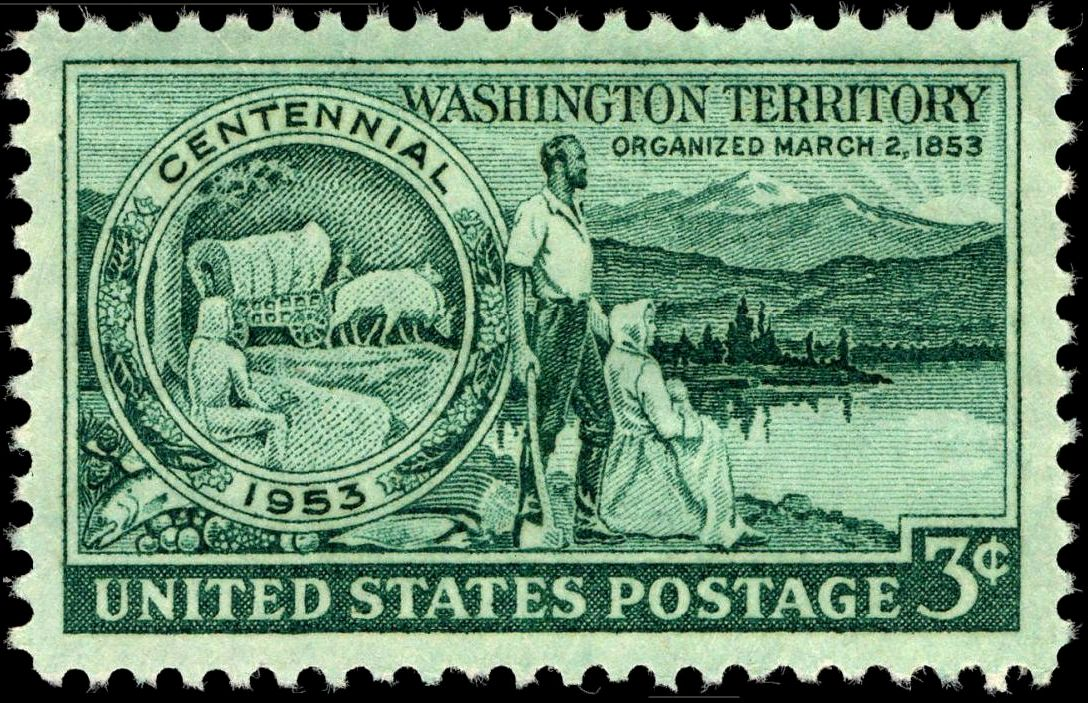
Washington Territory 1953 issue

The Spanish expedition of discovery of San Francisco Bay was depicted on the fourth and final denomination of the Panama-Pacific Exposition Issue, produced with both gauge 12 perforations (1913) and gauge 10 perforations (1915). The 10-cent stamp paid the domestic registered mail fee, and was commonly used to meet large weight and foreign destination rates. About 17 million were printed.

San Diego settlement was commemorated with a 6-cent stamp on its 200th anniversary, July 16, 1969. Governor Gaspar de Portola, accompanied by Father Junipero Serra, began colonization. The vignette shows the belfry of the mission at Carmel.

Alta California first civil settlement in 1777 was commemorated on the 200th anniversary in 1977. San Jose was California's first civic settlement founded by Mexican colonists naming the community, "El Pueblo de San Jose de Guadalupe". The town supported the military with agricultural production. The native Olhone culture was disrupted by disease, missionaries and farming.

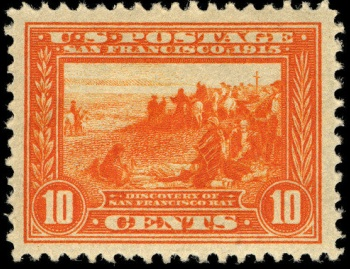
San Francisco, California 1913 issue

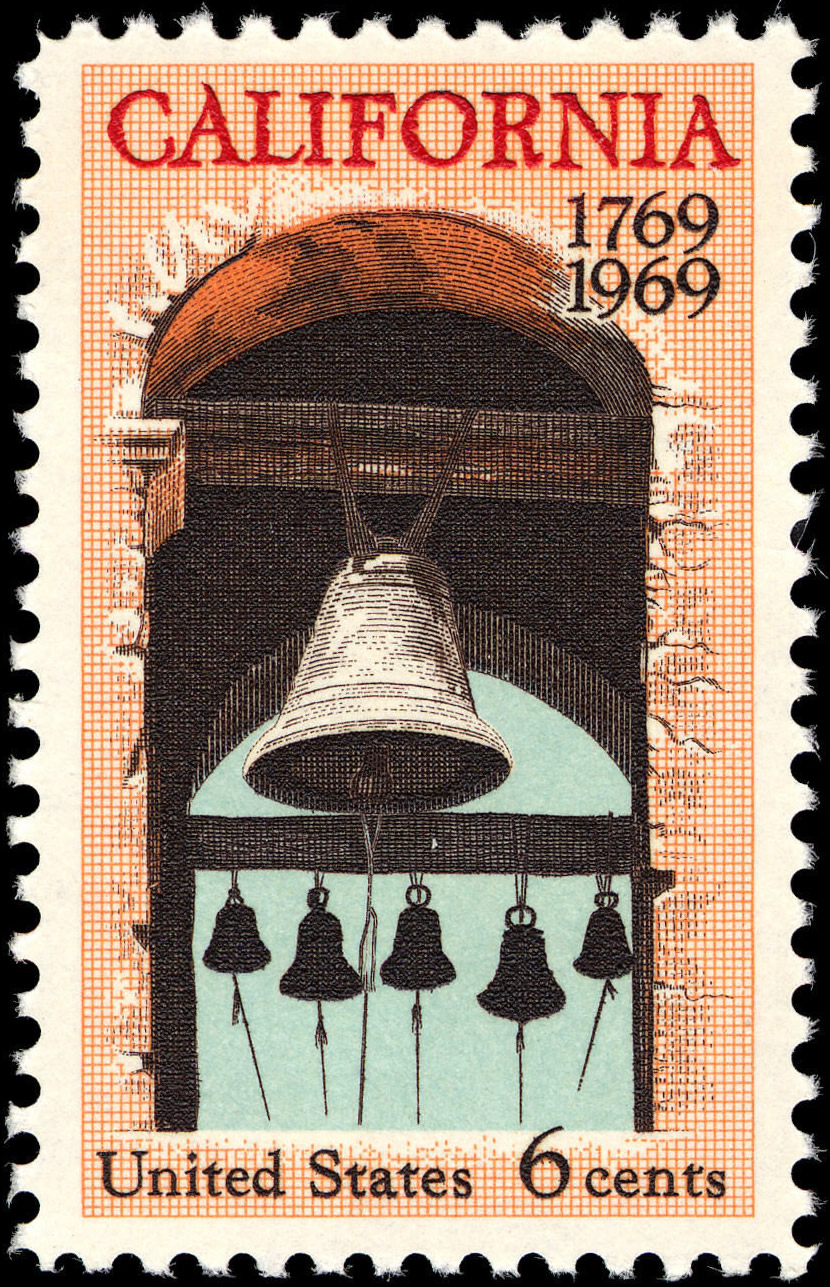
San Diego, California 1969 issue

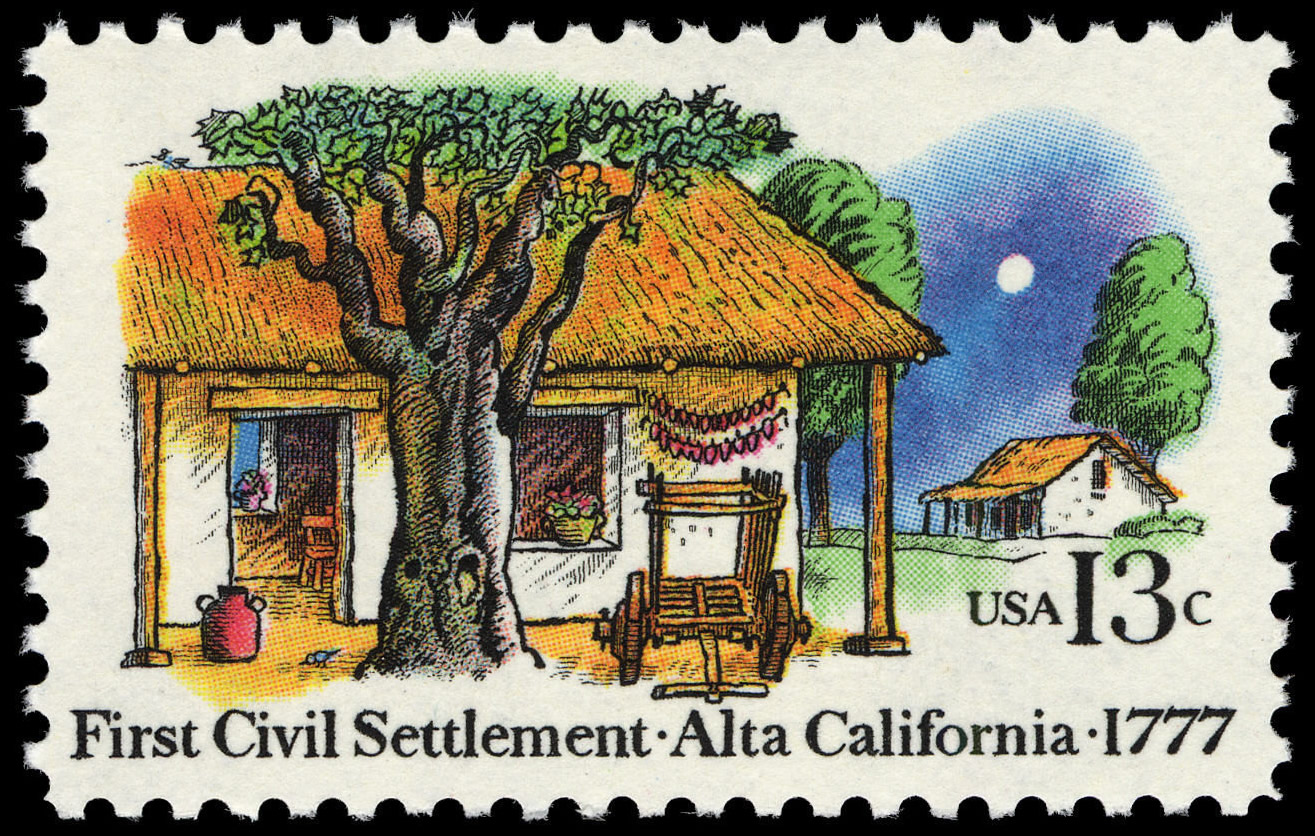
Alta California 1777 1977 issue

The California Territory population exploded with the California Gold Rush. A 3-cent stamp issued on January 24, 1948, commemorated the centennial of the discovery of gold in California. The stamp pictures Sutter's Mill where the discovery started "the rush of Argonauts". Although only a few made large fortunes, thousands who came stayed and contributed to California's rapid development as a territory.

The first permanent white settlement of Nevada was commemorated on its 100th anniversary on a 3-cent stamp issued on July 14, 1951. The stamp depicts a log cabin, mountain range, and a pioneer scene.

The Silver Centennial commemorative was issued through the Virginia City, Nevada, post office on June 8, 1959. The 4-cent stamp's vignette depicts Henry Comstock at the Mount Davidson site of the rich silver deposit discovered by Patrick McLaughlin and Peter O'Riley. The stamp was designed by Robert L. Miller and W.K. Schrage, printed by the rotary process, electric-eye perforated, and issued in panes of fifty stamps each. It had an initial printing of 120 million stamps.

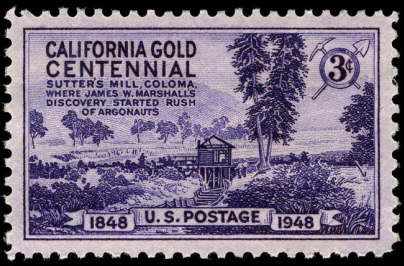
California gold rush 1948 issue

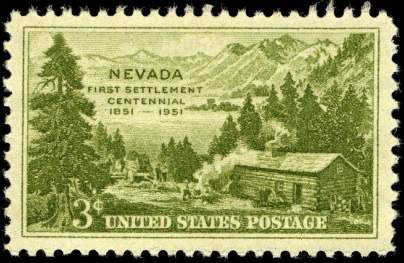
First Nevada settlement 1951 issue

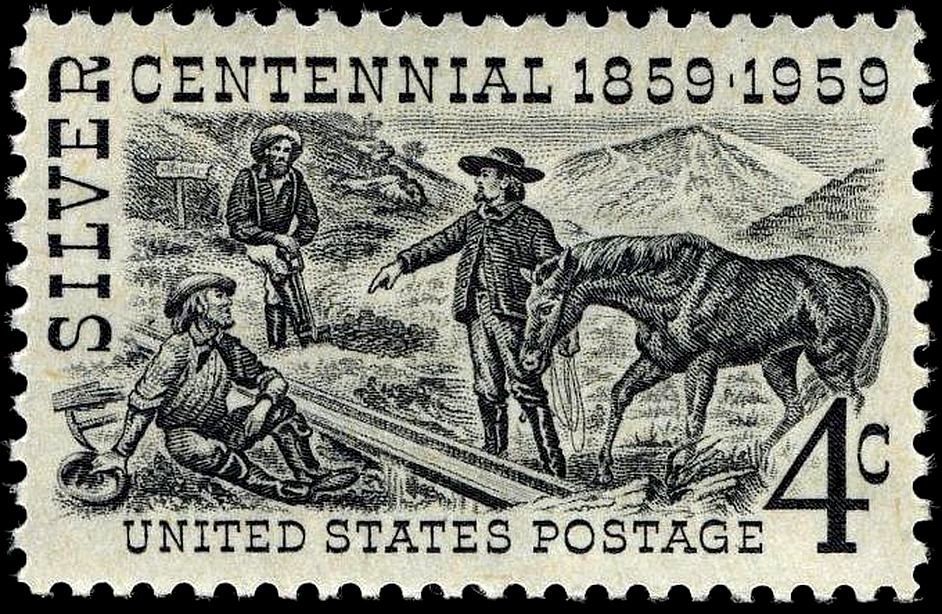
Nevada silver rush 1959 issue

== Statehood ==
=== States that were never territories ===
Each of the original 13 states was a British colony prior to the American Revolutionary War. Their foundation as states was celebrated at the 200th anniversary of the ratification of the U.S. Constitution in a series of thirteen stamps, which were issued in the chronological order of ratification between July 4, 1987 and May 29, 1990. The first three stamps—for Delaware, Pennsylvania and New Jersey—appeared in 1987. Nine stamps were issued during 1988 and 1989, with five state commemoratives issued the same day of their ratification: for Massachusetts, South Carolina, New Hampshire, Virginia and New York. Rhode Island's commemorative was issued on May 29, 1990.

Images are not available from USPS stamps since 1978. Click on the appropriate links for an image held at the Smithsonian Institution's online "Arago: people, postage & the post", National Postal Museum.

Delaware stamp

Pennsylvania stamp

New Jersey stamp

Georgia stamp

Connecticut stamp

Massachusetts stamp

Maryland stamp

South Carolina stamp

New Hampshire stamp

Virginia stamp

New York stamp

North Carolina stamp

Rhode Island stamp

In addition to the original 13, six subsequent states were never part of an organized incorporated U.S. territory: Vermont in 1791, formed from the territory of the Vermont Republic; Kentucky in 1792, set off from Virginia; Maine in 1820, set off from Massachusetts; Texas in 1845, formed from the territory of the Republic of Texas; California in 1850, from the western portion of the Mexican Cession; and West Virginia in 1863, set off from Virginia.

Vermont's 150th anniversary of statehood was celebrated with a 3-cent stamp on March 4, 1941. The vignette pictures the State Capitol at Montpelier. After a brief period of independence, Vermont became the 14th state to enter the Union.

The 150th anniversary of Kentucky's admission to the Union was commemorated with a 3-cent stamp on June 1, 1942. The scene from a State Capitol mural depicts Daniel Boone with companions overlooking the Kentucky River and the site on the opposite shore where Frankfort is now located.

Maine's statehood sesquicentennial was commemorated on the 6-cent stamp picturing the Lighthouse at Two Lights, Maine, issued July 9, 1970.

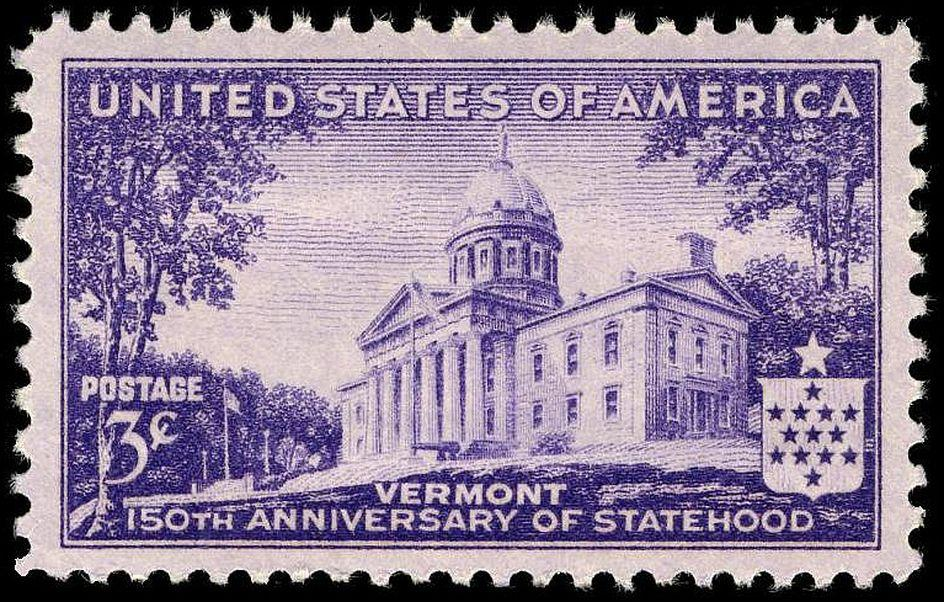
Vermont statehood, 1791 1941 issue

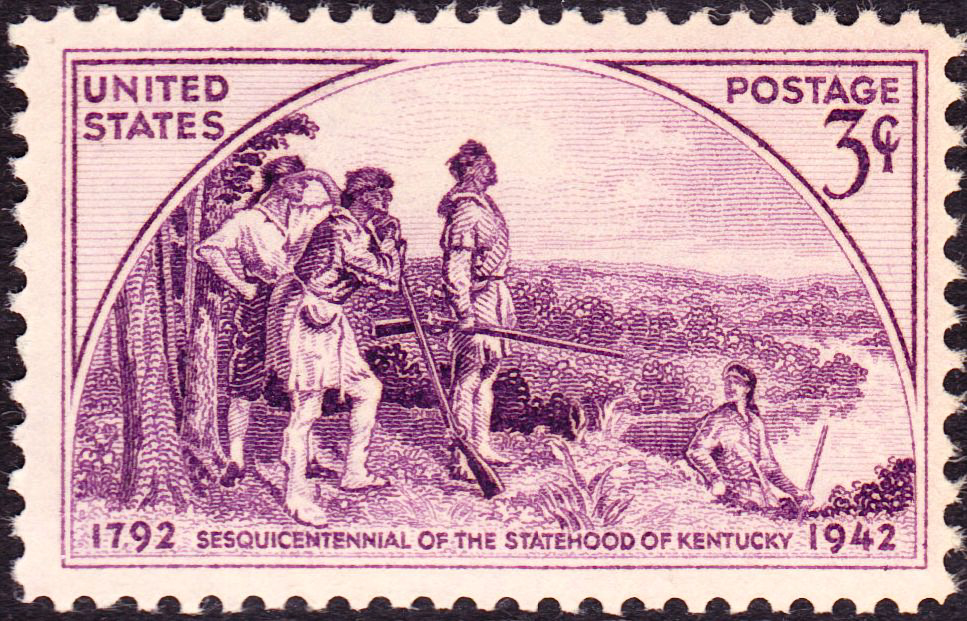
Kentucky statehood, 1792 1942 issue

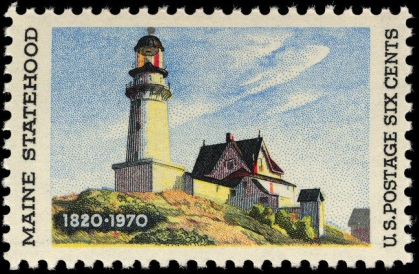
Maine statehood, 1820 1970 issue

Texas statehood's 100th anniversary was commemorated by a 3-cent stamp issued on December 29, 1945. The state was annexed in 1845 pursuant to a Republic of Texas petition to the United States, under the presidency of James K. Polk.

California statehood's 100th anniversary was commemorated by a 3-cent stamp issued on September 9, 1950. The vignette shows a miner panning gold, and a pioneer couple walking alongside an oxen drawn covered wagon. The left vertical panel shows a citrus tree and the ship bring news of California's statehood.

West Virginia statehood's 100th anniversary was commemorated by a 5-cent stamp on June 20, 1963. The foreground is a map outline of the state, the background features the state capitol.

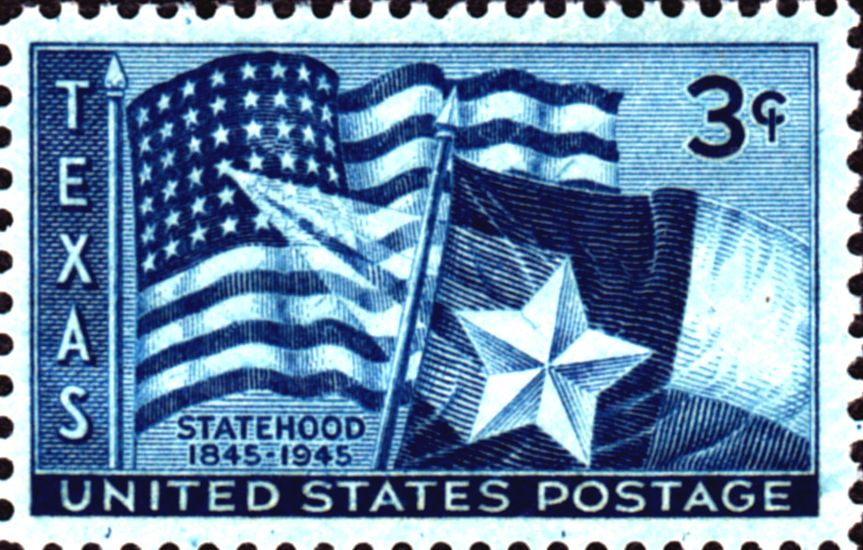
Texas statehood, 1845 1945 issue

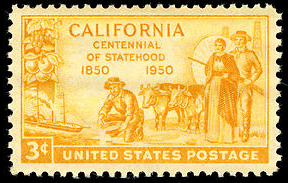
California statehood, 1850 1950 issue

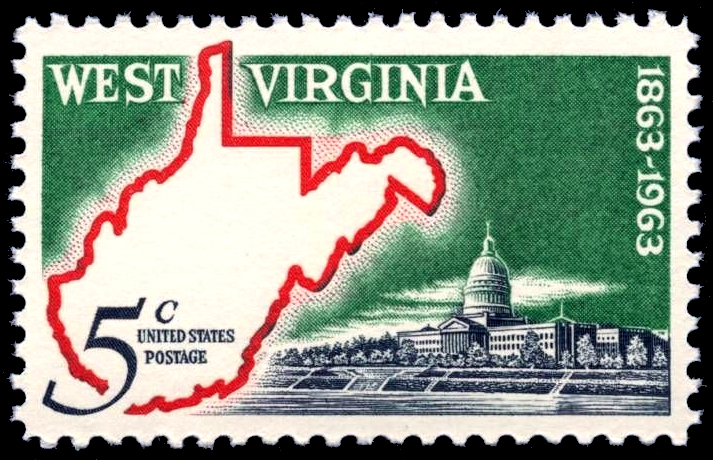
West Virginia statehood, 1863 1963 issue

=== Eastern states from territories ===
The 150th anniversary of Tennessee statehood was commemorated by a 3-cent stamp on June 1, 1946. The Tennessee State Capitol is in the center, flanked by portraits of Andrew Jackson, the first U. S. President from Tennessee (left) and John Sevier, the first governor of Tennessee (right).

Ohio's statehood sesquicentennial was commemorated by a 3-cent stamp issued March 2, 1953. The central design features the state seal imposed on a map outline of the state. Sixteen stars in the left and right borders represent states admitted previously; a seventeenth star in the top center represents Ohio, and a buckeye leaf appears in the lower left.

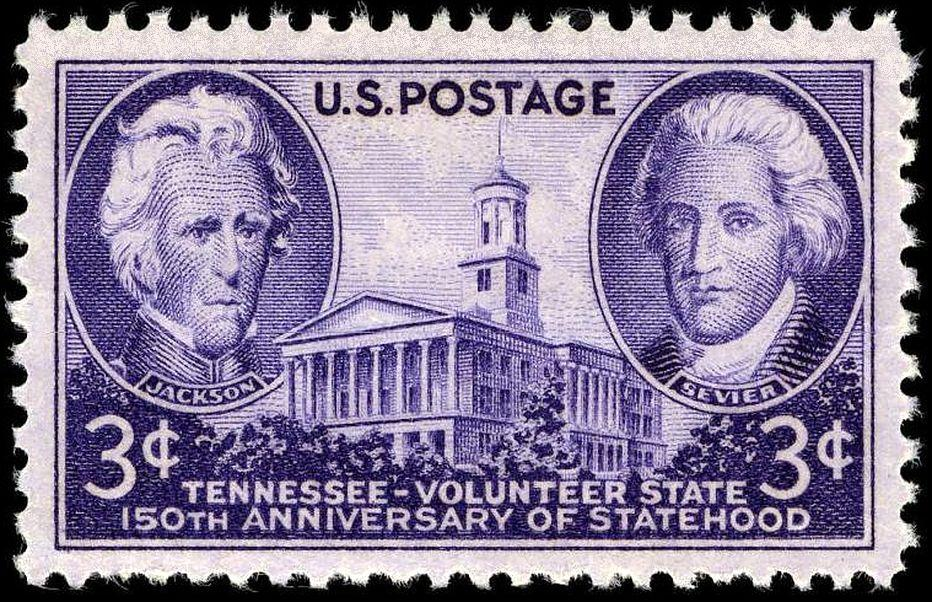
Tennessee statehood, 1796 1946 issue

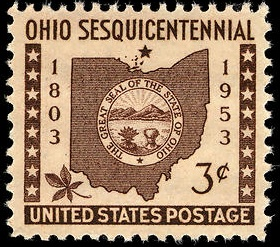
Ohio statehood, 1803 1953 issue

The 150th anniversary of Indiana's admission to the Union was commemorated with a 5-cent stamp on April 16, 1966. The design is based on that used for the Sesquicentennial observance, featuring the first capitol building, a map outline and a cluster of 19 stars symbolizing the states in the Union at Indiana's admission.

Mississippi statehood's 150th anniversary was commemorated with a 5-cent stamp on December 11, 1967. Andrew Bucci's design features an image of the state flower, the magnolia.

Illinois statehood's 150th anniversary was commemorated with a 6-cent stamp on February 12, 1968. It features a scene of a farm house and outbuildings on rolling plains under a cloudy sky.

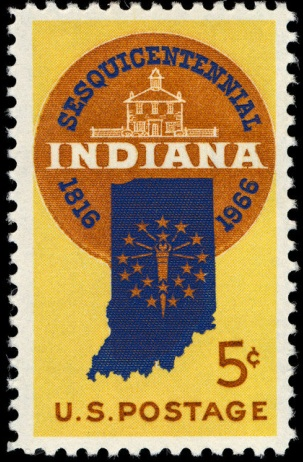
Indiana statehood, 1816 1966 issue

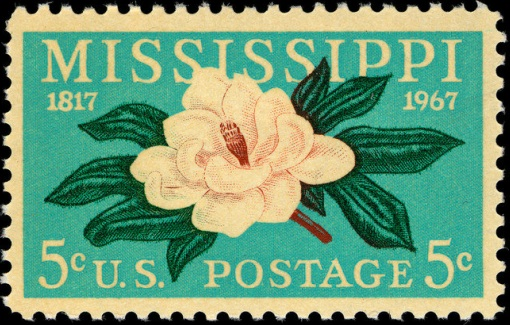
Mississippi statehood, 1817 1967 issue

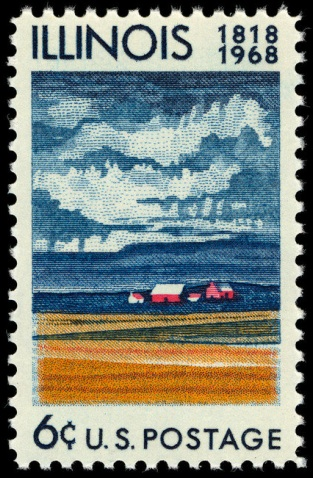
Illinois statehood, 1818 1968 issue

Alabama's statehood 150th anniversary was celebrated with a 6-cent stamp on August 2, 1969, at Huntsville, the first temporary seat of government. The state flower, the camellia, and the state bird, the yellowhammer, are featured.

The centennial of Michigan's admission to the Union was commemorated by a 3-cent issued on November 1, 1935, although it became a state on January 26, 1837. The 3-cent stamp features the Michigan state seal flanked by a forest scene and an urban industrial scene.

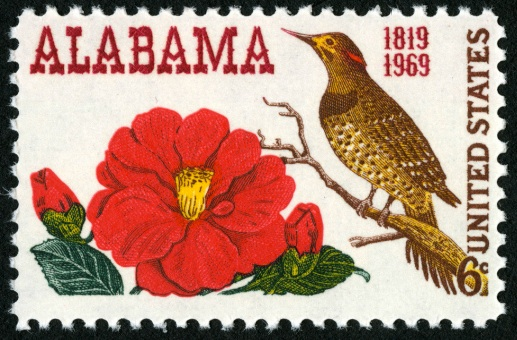
Alabama, 1819 1969 issue

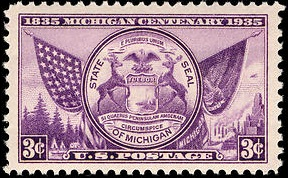
Michigan statehood, 1835 1935 issue

Florida's statehood centennial was celebrated by a 3-cent stamp on March 3, 1945. The center of the stamp features the original state seal. The gates of St. Augustine are pictured on the left and the State Capitol in Tallahassee on the right.

Wisconsin's statehood 100th anniversary was commemorated by a 3-cent stamp on May 29, 1948. The foreground features a scroll with a map outline of the state, the background design shows the State Capitol. The population of 150,000 exceeded the minimum of 60,000 required by the Ordinance of 1787 for the Northwest Territory.

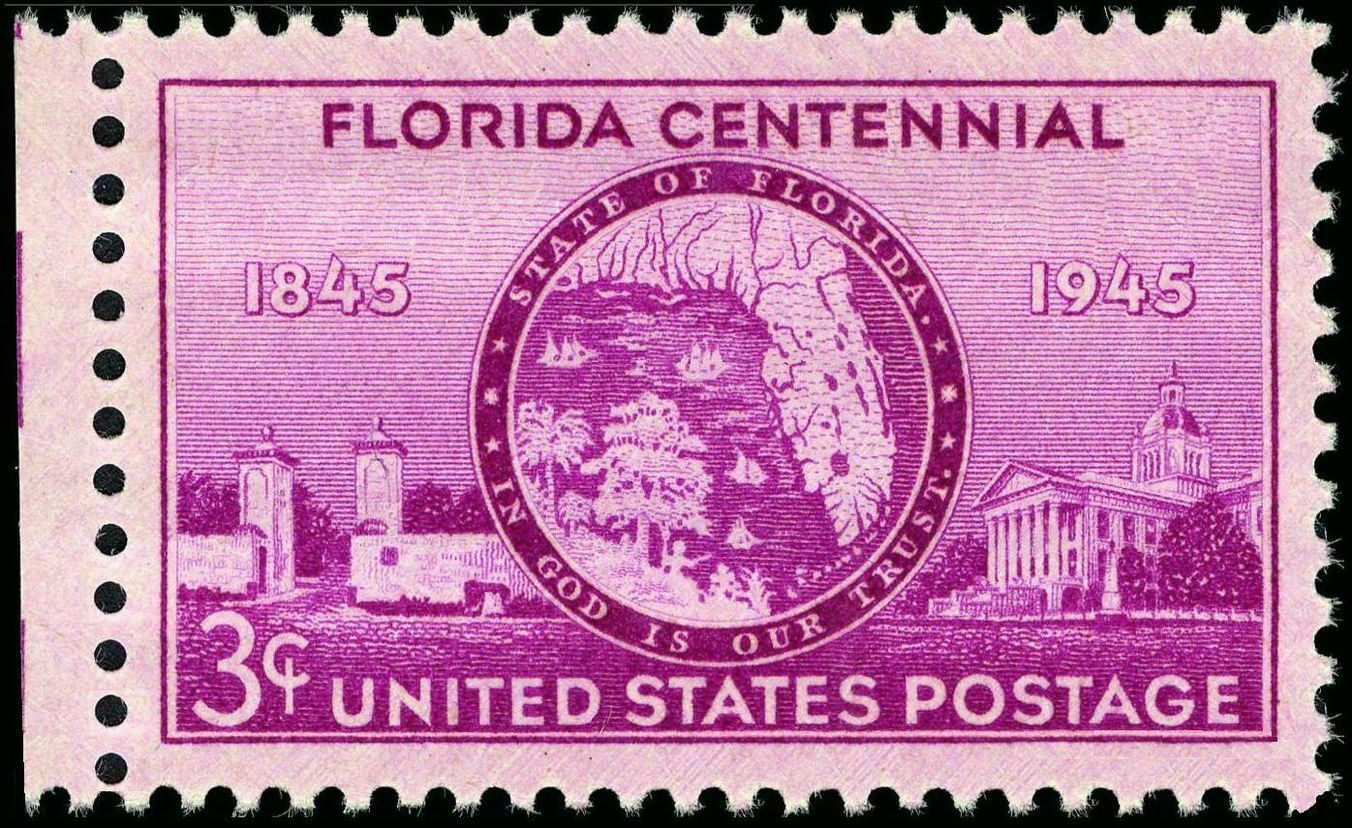
Florida statehood, 1845 1945 issue

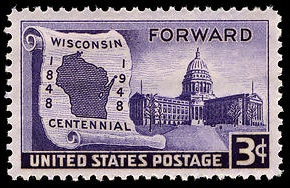
Wisconsin statehood, 1848 1948 issue

=== Western states from territories ===
Louisiana'a 150th anniversary of statehood was celebrated with a 4-cent stamp issued on April 30, 1962. The central design features a steam riverboat seen through a foreground of a riverbank tree with Spanish moss. Norman Todhunter designed the stamp.

Missouri statehood's 150th anniversary was commemorated with an 8-cent stamp on May 8, 1971. The vignette, which comes from Thomas Hart Benton's Independence and the Opening of the West, shows a Native American offering a pipe to settlers in a camp with a wagon train cresting a ridge in the background.

Arkansas observed its 100th anniversary of statehood ending its territorial status in 1936, commemorated by a 3-cent stamp issued on June 15. The central vignette features the Old State House in Little Rock. It is flanked by Arkansas Post, the first European settlement in Arkansas by the French, and the first Arkansas State Capitol.

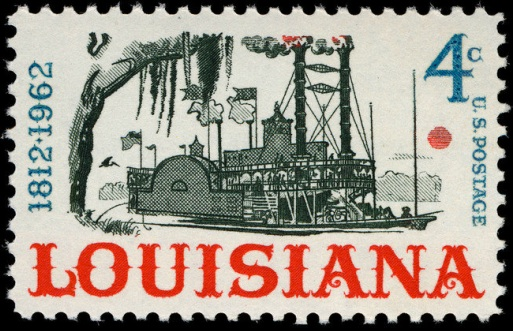
Louisiana statehood, 1802 1962 issue

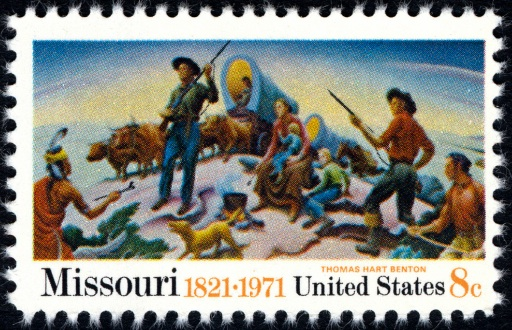
Missouri statehood, 1821 1971 issue

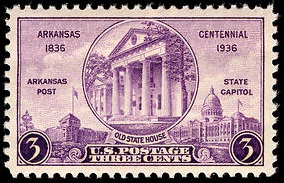
Arkansas statehood, 1836 1936 issue

Iowa statehood's 100th anniversary was commemorated by a 3-cent stamp on August 3, 1946. The stamp shows the Iowa state flag superimposed on an outline map of the state, and stalks of corn flank the design.

Minnesota statehood's 100th anniversary was celebrated with a 3-cent stamp on May 11, 1958. The vignette highlights the state's lakes, islands and low rolling hills. The foreground features a pine branch.

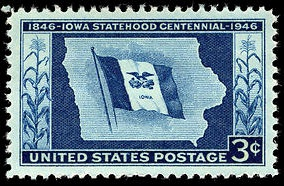
Iowa statehood, 1846 1946 issue

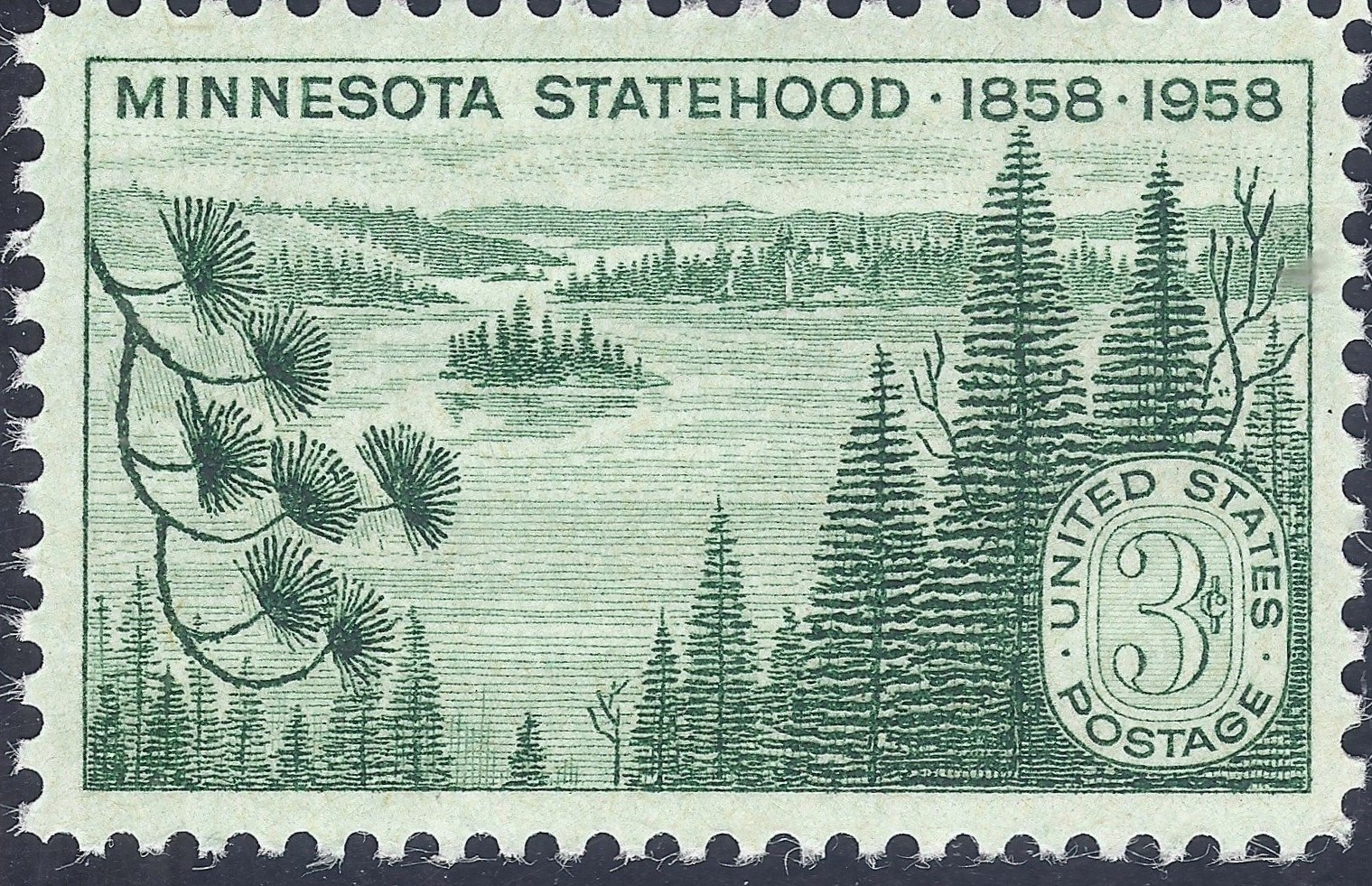
Minnesota statehood, 1858 1958 issue

Oregon's statehood was commemorated with a 4-cent stamp on February 14, 1959. The central design is an unhorsed covered wagon, with Mount Hood in the right background, sloping westward to the Pacific Ocean. A star on the left symbolizes statehood.

Kansas statehood 100th anniversary was commemorated by a 4-cent stamp on May 10, 1961. The design features a sunflower in the foreground with a pioneer couple and a stockade fort in the background.

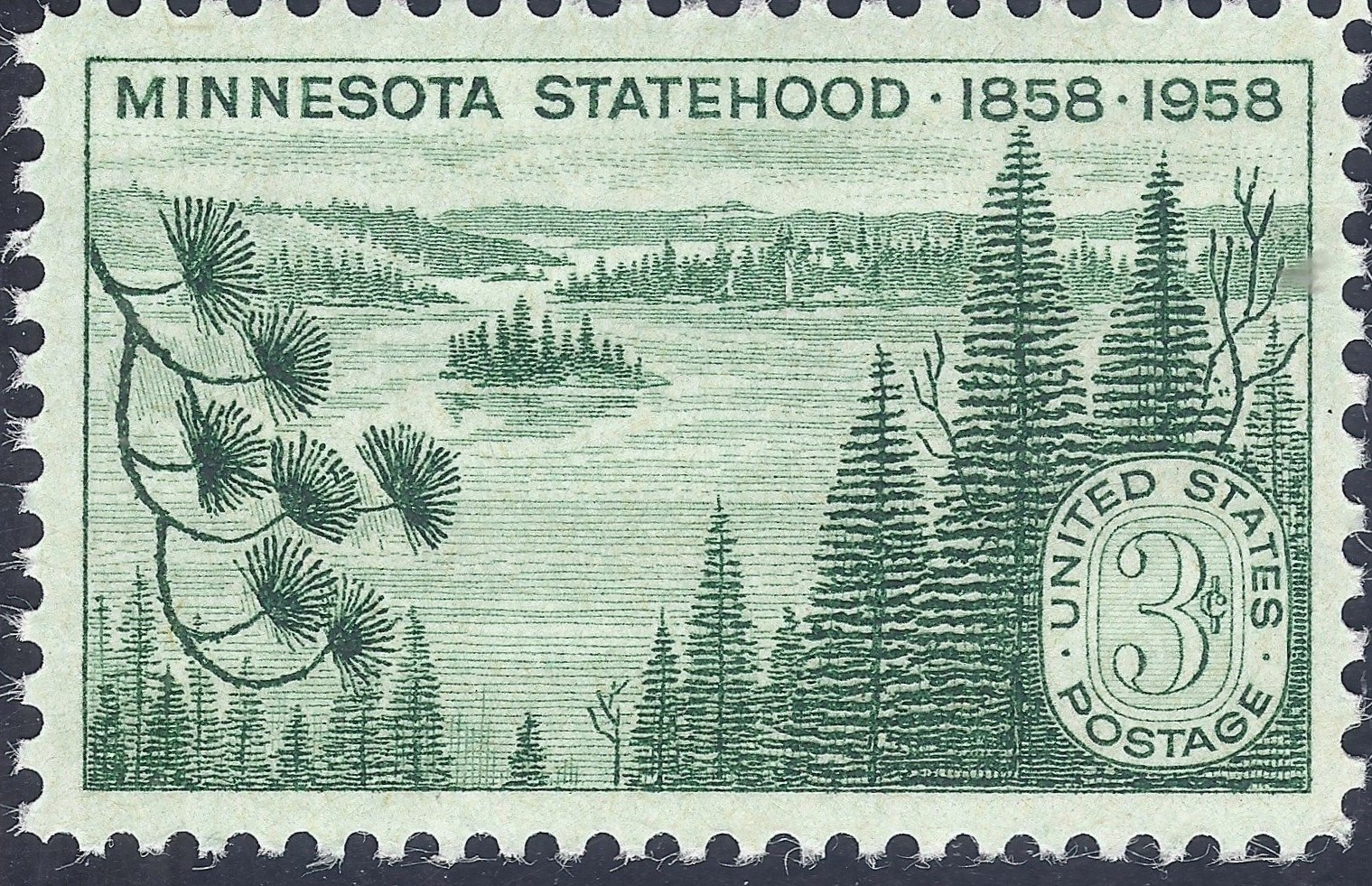
Minnesota statehood, 1858 1958 issue

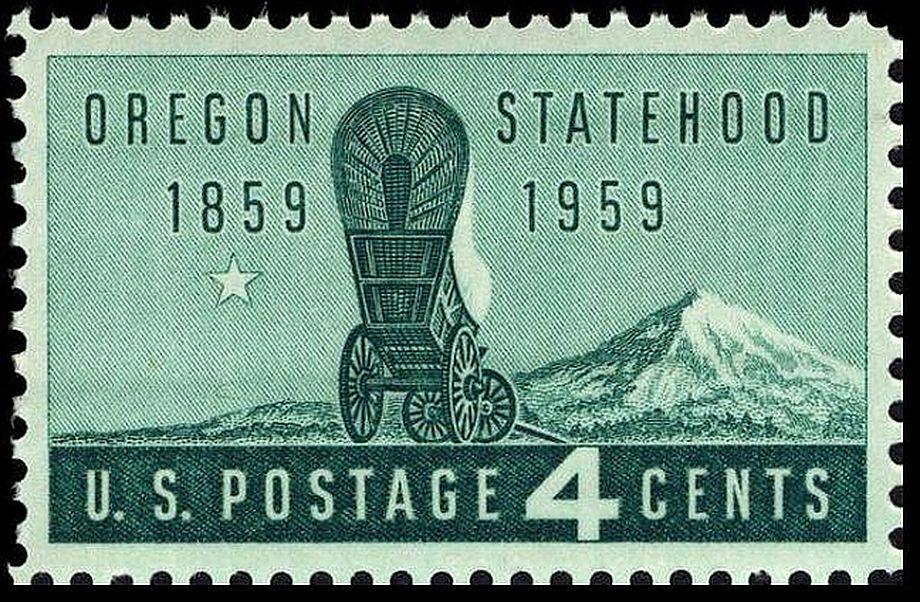
Oregon statehood, 1859 1959 issue

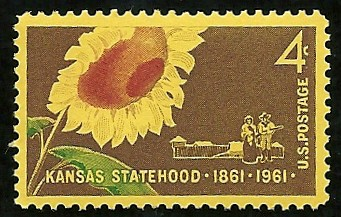
Kansas statehood, 1861 1961 issue

Nevada celebrated its statehood 100th anniversary with a 5-cent stamp on July 22, 1964. The scene depicts Carson City, a major tourist attraction.

Nebraska celebrated its 100th statehood anniversary with a 5-cent stamp on July 29, 1967. The stamp features a Hereford cow imposed on a background of an ear of yellow corn.

Colorado celebrated its statehood 75th anniversary with a 3-cent stamp on August 1, 1951. The central design is of Colorado's capitol building flanked in the background with Mount of the Holy Cross and the state seal. In the foreground appear the state flower, the columbine, and mounted cowboy.

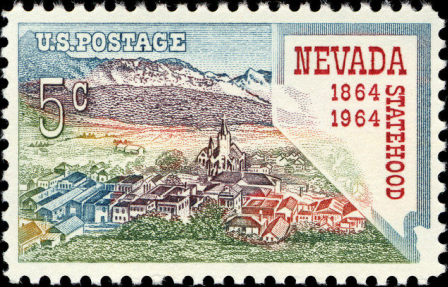
Nevada statehood, 1864 1964 issue

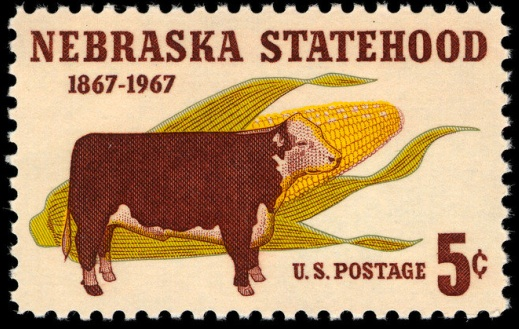
Nebraska statehood, 1867 1967 issue

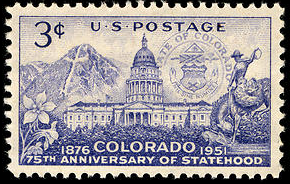
Colorado statehood, 1876 1951 issue

Four states celebrated their 50th anniversary of statehood ending territorial status with a 3-cent stamp on November 2, 1939. They were North Dakota, South Dakota, Montana and Washington state. The stamp shows a map of the northwestern United States with the four subject states in outline.

Idaho commemorated statehood 50th anniversary with a 3-cent stamp on July 3, 1940. The stamp shows the State Capitol building.

Wyoming commemorated statehood's 50th anniversary with a 3-cent stamp on July 10, 1940. The stamp design shows the state seal, the central figure is a woman before a banner, "Equal Rights", flanked by men symbolizing live stock and grain, mines and oil.

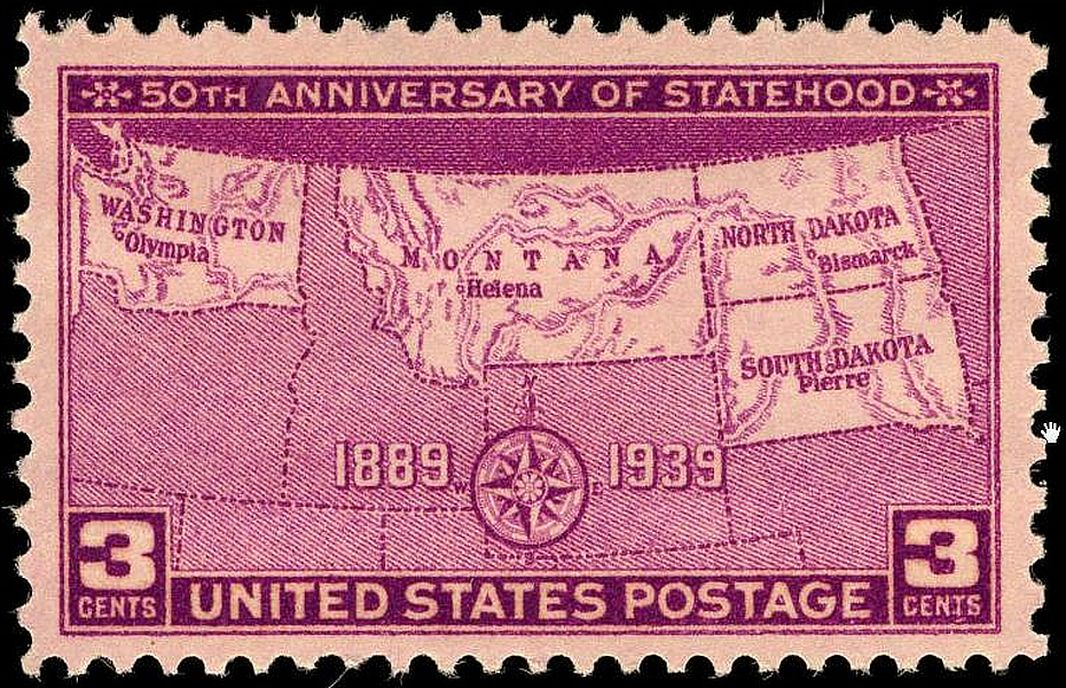
4- state statehood, 1889 ND, SD, MT, WA 1939 issue

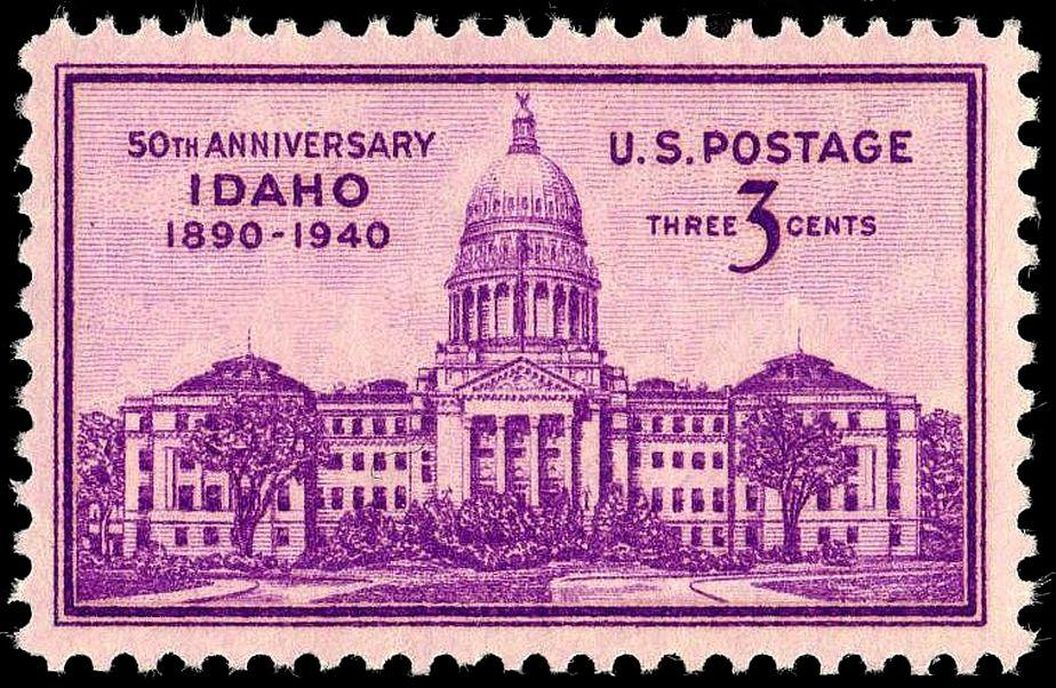
Idaho statehood, 1890 1940 issue

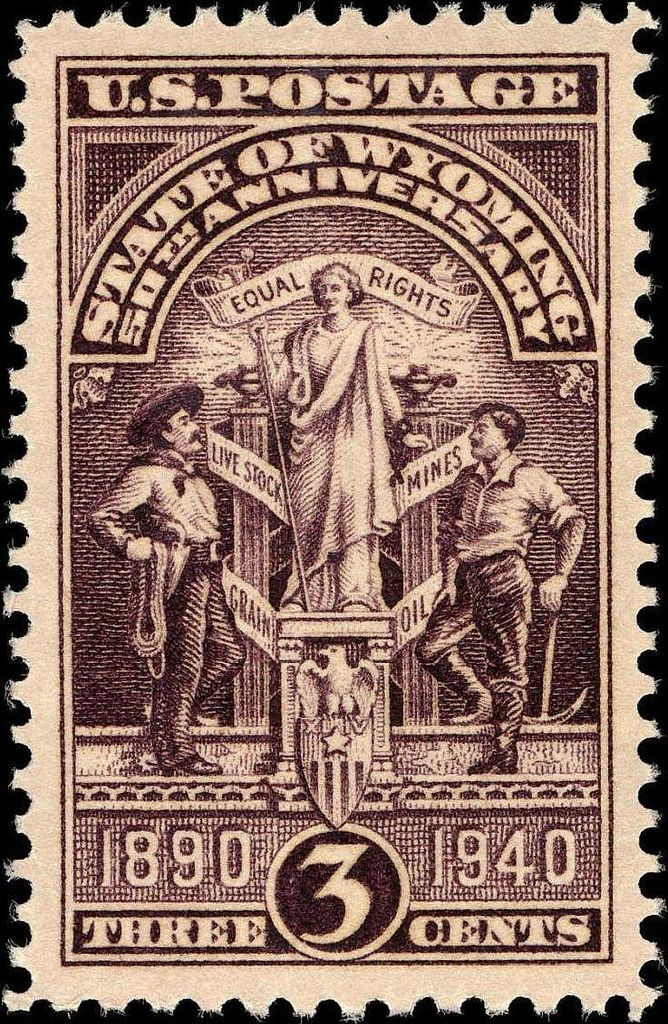
Wyoming statehood, 1890 1940 issue

Oklahoma's statehood 50th anniversary was commemorated with a 3-cent stamp on June 14, 1957. The foreground is an arrow piercing the atomic orbital symbol, imposed on a map outline of the state, with the slogan, "arrows to atoms".

New Mexico statehood 50th anniversary was celebrated with a 4-cent stamp on January 6, 1962. The stamp features a northwestern New Mexican mesa named "Shiprock".

Arizona celebrated statehood 50th anniversary with a 4-cent stamp on February 14, 1962. The foreground features the state flower of the giant saguaro cactus, the background is a moonlit desert scene.

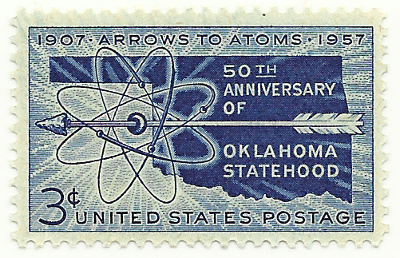
Oklahoma, 1907 1962 issue

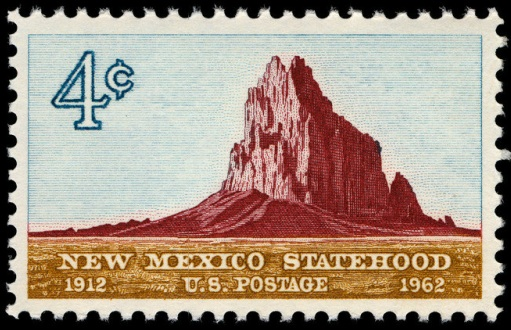
New Mexico, 1912 1962 issue

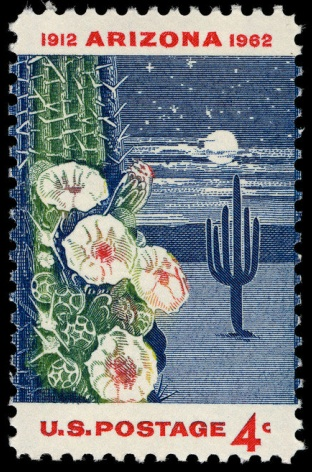
Arizona, 1912 1962 issue

Alaska statehood was celebrated with a 7-cent airmail stamp on January 3, 1959. The stamp shows the state flag's star constellations of the Big Dipper and North Star superimposed on a map outline of the state. The background is of wooded hills and snow-capped mountains.

Hawaii statehood was celebrated with a 7-cent airmail stamp on August 29, 1959, the date of the presidential proclamation of Hawaii's admission to the Union. The stamp pictures a Hawaiian warrior and a five pointed star for statehood imposed on the background of a topical relief map of the islands.

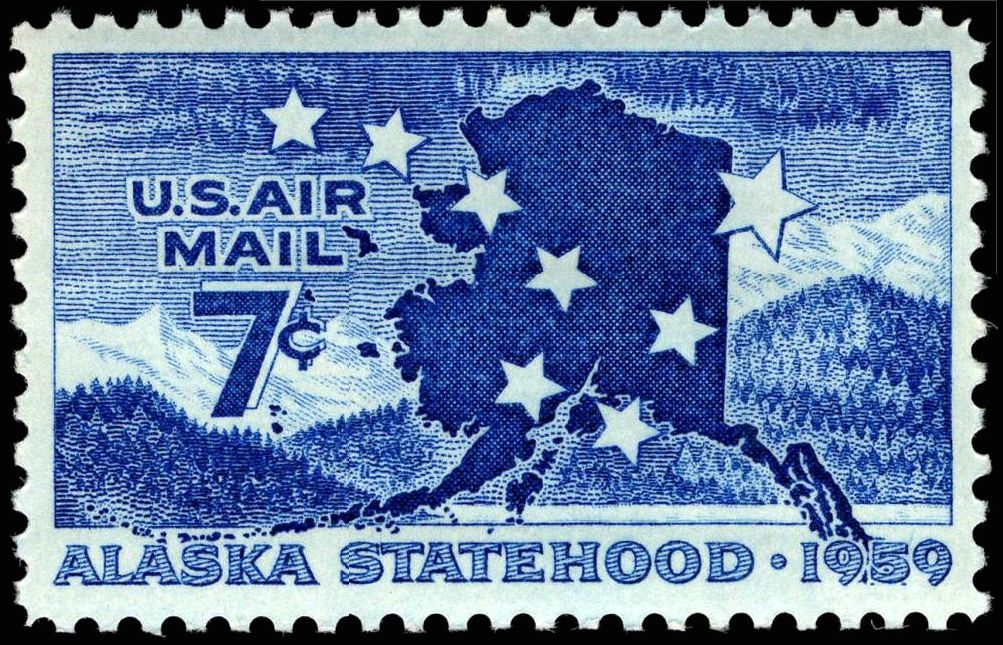
Alaska, 1959 1959 issue

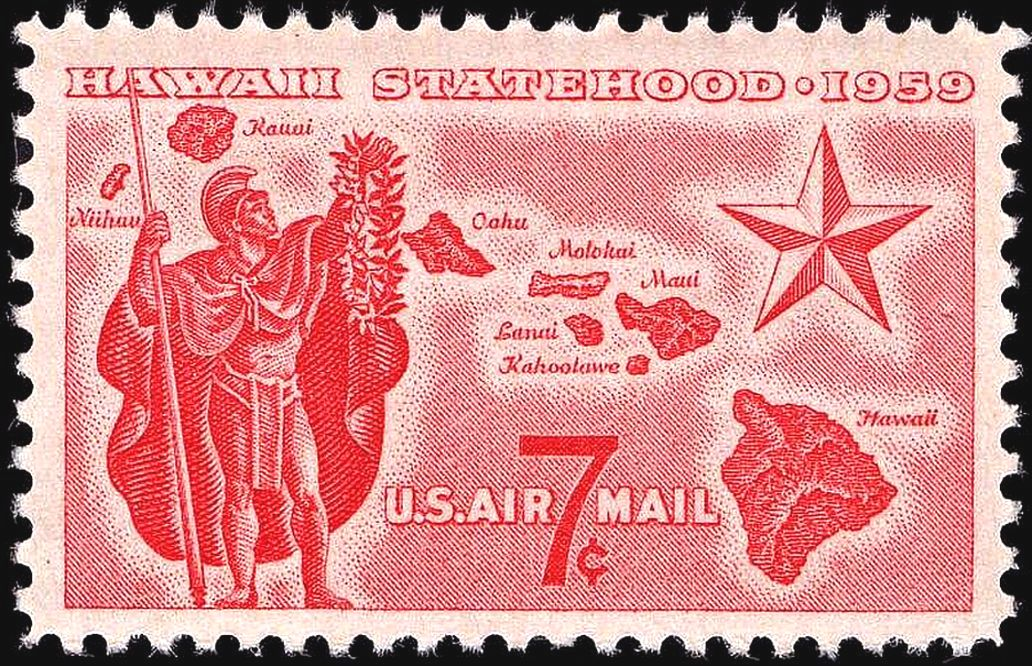
Hawaii, 1959 1959 issue

One modern stamp issued by USPS completes the commemoration of the fifty states, Utah stamp, 1996 issue, a 32-cent stamp on January 4, 1996, commemorated Utah statehood 100th anniversary. The stamp depicts the iconic Delicate Arch geological formation framing the La Sal Mountains.

== Explorers ==
Early explorers include Christopher Columbus and Leif Erikson.

Christopher Columbus was honored in the first U.S. commemorative stamps in the Columbian Exposition issue of 1893. On his return to Spain, Columbus reported his discoveries to the Spanish monarchs Ferdinand and Isabella, who made the Americas widely known in Europe.

Leif Erikson the 11th century Norse explorer was honored with a 6-cent stamp on October 9, 1968 — Leif Erikson Day. The stamp was inspired by the statue of Leif by American Stirling Calder in Reykjavík, Iceland.

Vasco Núñez de Balboa, the Spanish explorer of the Panama Canal region, is honored in the Panama-Pacific Exposition issue. Balboa called the western ocean 'Mar del Sur'. The 1-cent stamp paid the post card rate. Patrons also commonly combined it with other denominations to fulfill large weight and foreign destination rates. Over 330 million 1-cent stamps were printed.

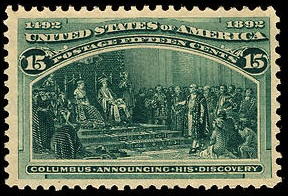
Christopher Columbus, Caribbean 1893 issue

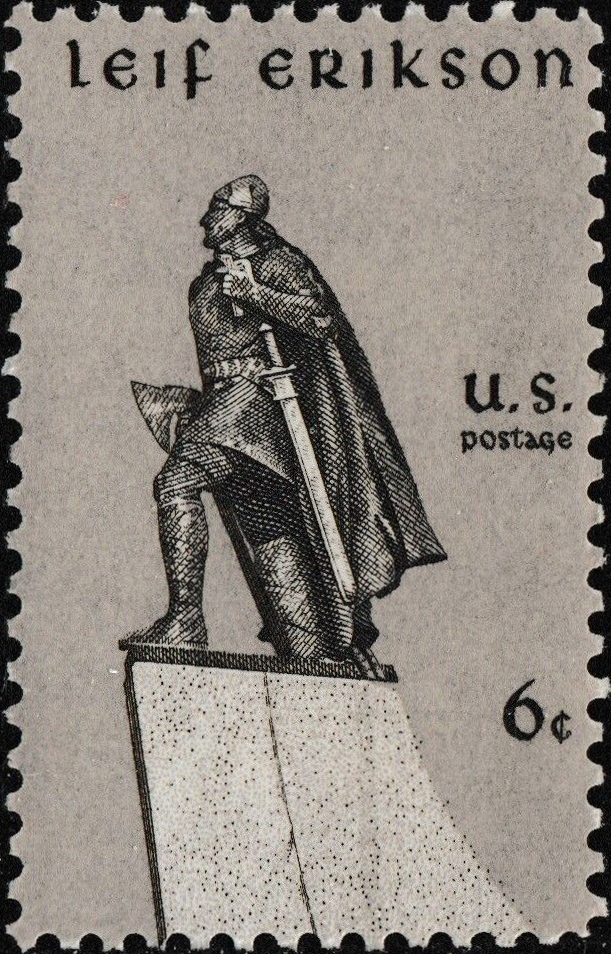
Leif Erikson, Vinland 1968 issue

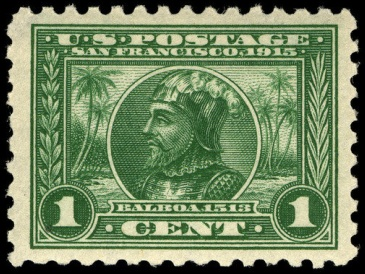
Vasco Núñez de Balboa, Panama Isthmus 1913 issue

Early French explorers include Antoine Cadillac, Jacques Marquette and Jean Nicolet.

Antoine de la Mothe Cadillac was honored with a 3-cent stamp on July 24, 1951, to commemorate the 250th anniversary of his landing at Detroit in 1701. Cadillac founded the city of Detroit. The stamp's background design depicts Detroit's skyline as it appeared in 1951 and the foreground shows Cadillac's landing at Detroit in 1701. His namesake is the Cadillac motor vehicle company.

Jacques Marquette was honored on the one-cent stamp of the Trans-Mississippi Exposition Issue. The vignette shows him on the Mississippi River, which he and Louis Jolliet explored (from the Wisconsin River downstream to the Arkansas River) in 1673. Marquette was also honored on a 6-cent stamp, issued September 20, 1968, at Sault Sainte Marie, Michigan, where he established in 1668 the oldest permanent settlement in that state.

Explorer Jean Nicolet's landing at Green Bay, Wisconsin, in 1634 was celebrated on its 300th anniversary by a violet 3-cent stamp issued on July 7, 1934. The vignette is taken from a painting by Edward W. Deming depicting Nicolet's landing at Green Bay, with numerous Indians present.

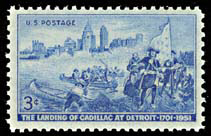
Antoine de la Mothe Cadillac, Detroit 1951 issue

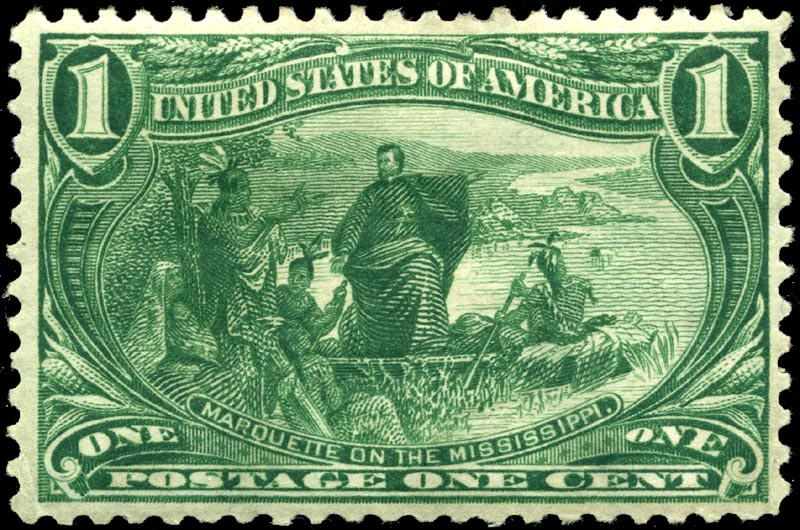
Jacques Marquette, Mississippi River 1898 issue

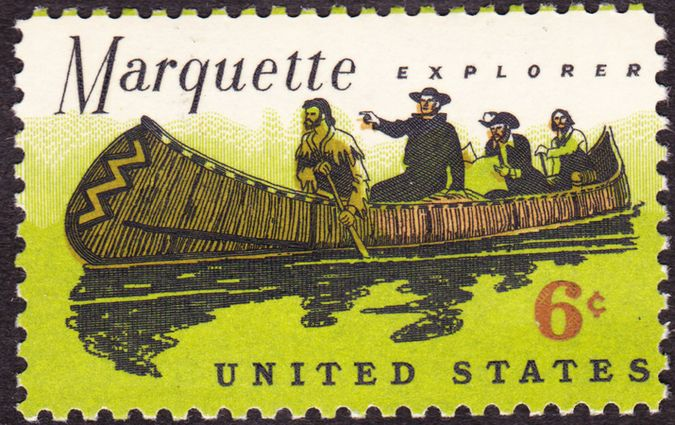
Jacques Marquette, Sault Ste. Marie 1968 issue

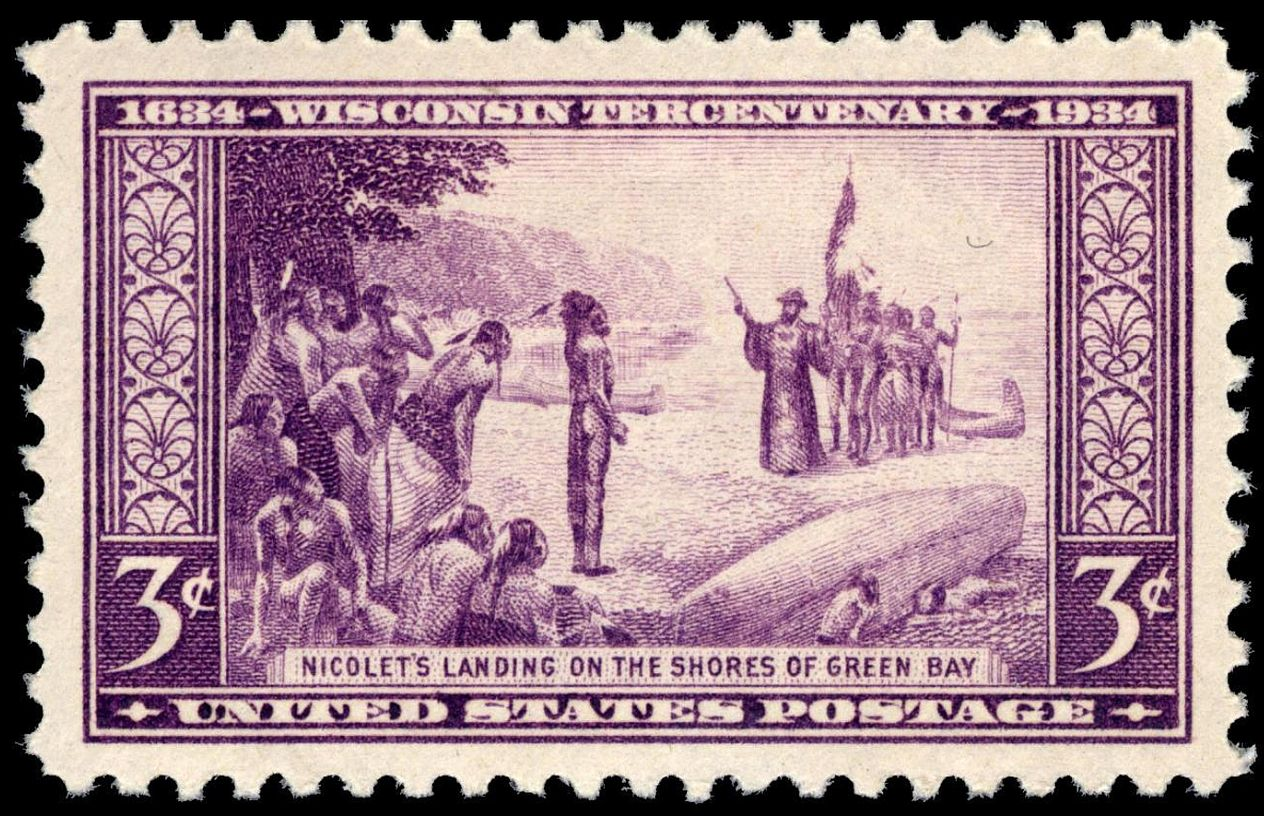
Jean Nicolet, Wisconsin 1934 issue

Early English explorers include John Smith and Philip Carteret.

Captain John Smith—who promoted the Jamestown settlement, explored the Chesapeake region and as its governor, is credited with its success—was honored on the 1-cent stamp of the Jamestown Exposition issue. The Simon de Passe engraving of John Smith (1580–1631) inspired the image on the stamp.

Philip Carteret was honored on New Jersey's 300th anniversary 5-cent stamp on June 15, 1964, which shows Carteret landing at Elizabethtown (Elizabeth), the state's oldest city. The scene is superimposed over an outline map of New Jersey.

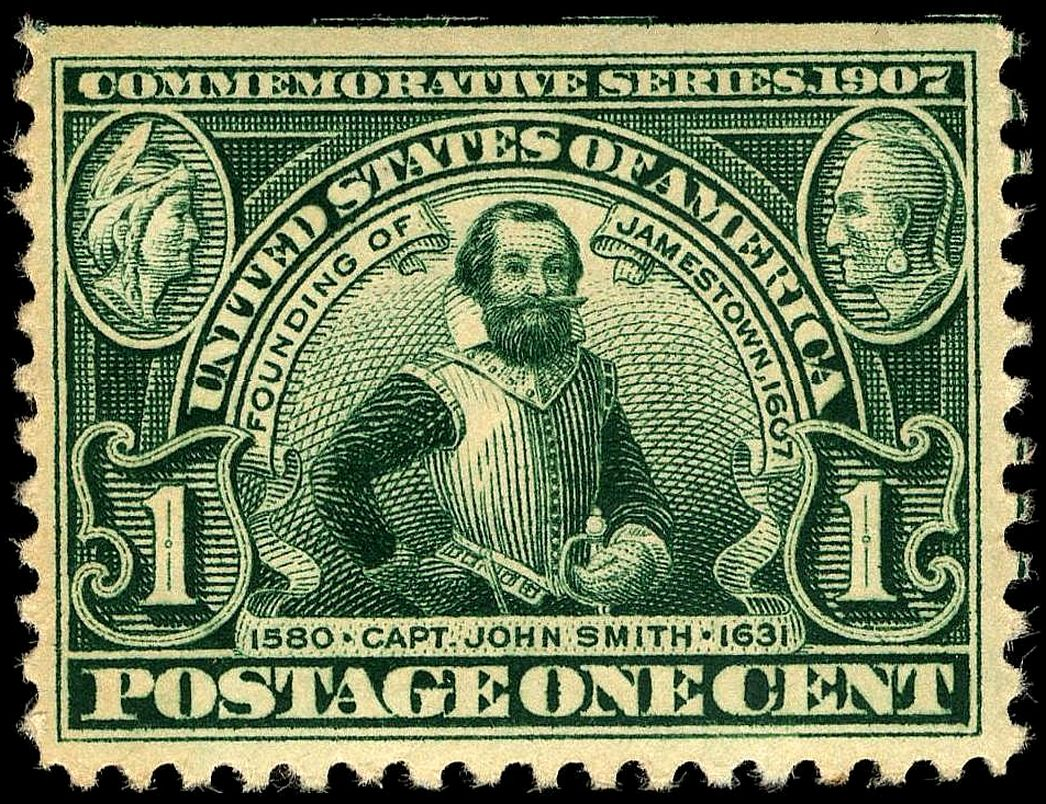
John Smith, Virginia 1907 issue

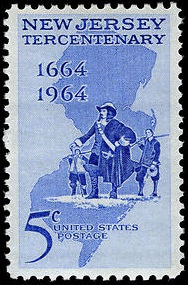
Philip Carteret, New Jersey 1964 issue

Francisco Vázquez de Coronado found the Pacific Southwest exploring for Spain. On the 400th anniversary a 3-cent stamp was issued May 29, 1935. The California Pacific International Exposition is shown with Point Loma and San Diego Bay in the background.

Coronado's expeditions of exploration through the southwestern states in search of riches were celebrated on a 3-cent stamp issued September 7, 1940, on the 400th anniversary. He extended northeast as far as Kansas learning about the Indians and the regional topography.

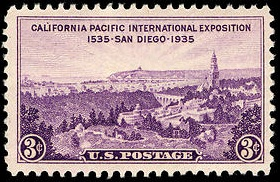
Francisco Vázquez de Coronado, California 1935 issue

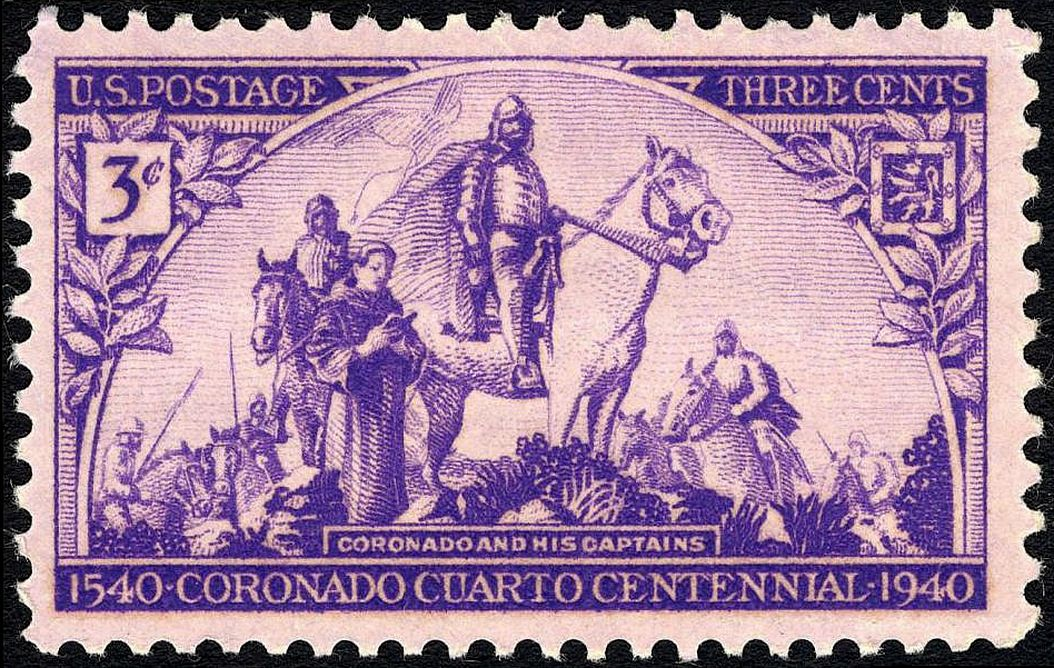
Francisco Vázquez de Coronado 1940 issue

Early American explorers include Daniel Boone, Lewis and Clark.

Daniel Boone was honored with a 6-cent stamp in the American Folklore Series, issued on September 26, 1968, at Frankfort, Kentucky, where he was buried. He was a famous frontiersman in the development of Virginia, Kentucky and the trans-Appalachian west. A wall of roughly-hewn boards display the tools of Boone's trade—a Pennsylvania rifle, a powder horn, and a knife. The pipe tomahawk represents that the Shawnees had adopted Boone. His name and birth date was carved on the wall.

Captain Meriwether Lewis and Lieutenant William Clark commanded the Corps of Discovery to map the Pacific Northwest. They were honored with a 3-cent stamp July 24, 1954 on the 150th anniversary. The 1803 Louisiana Purchase doubled the size of the United States Lewis and Clark, described and sketched its flora and fauna and described the native inhabitants they encountered before returning to St. Louis in 1806.

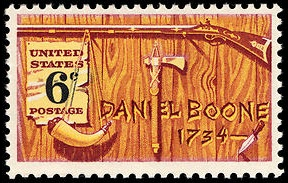
Daniel Boone, Virginia, Kentucky 1968 issue

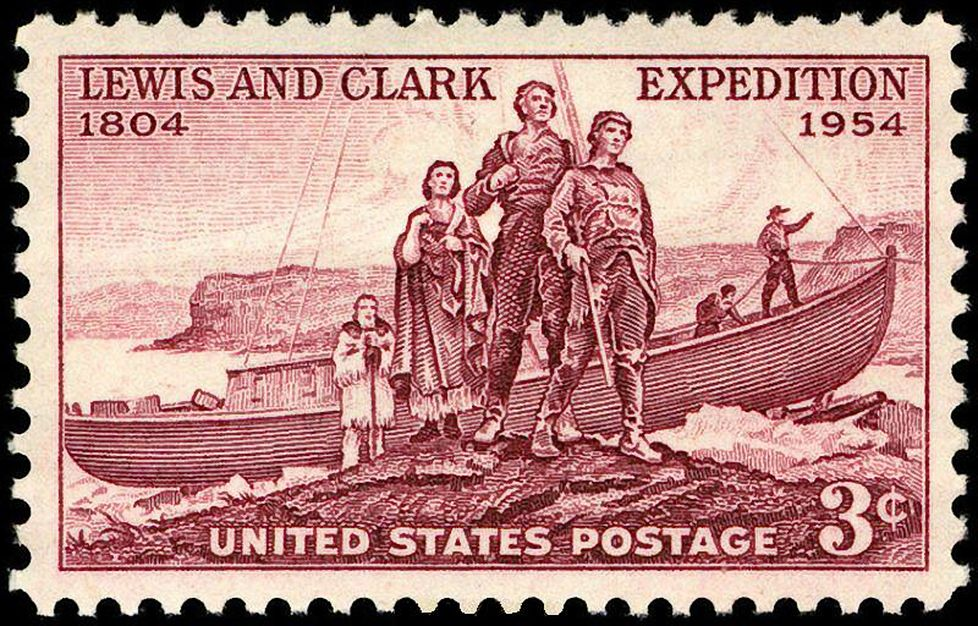
Lewis and Clark Expedition 1954 issue

- The Lewis and Clark expedition was also celebrated on May 14, 2004, the 200th anniversary of its outset depicting the two on a hilltop outlook. Two companion 37-cent stamps showed portraits of Meriwether Lewis and William Clark. A special 32-page booklet accompanied the issue in eleven cities along the route taken by the Corps of Discovery. An image of the stamp can be found on Arago online at the link in the footnote.

Later American explorers include Lewis and Clark, John C. Frémont and John Wesley Powell.

Captain John C. Frémont was honored on the 5-cent stamp of the Trans-Mississippi Exposition Issue. He was pictured in a vignette placing the United States flag on a peak in the Rocky Mountains at the age of thirty in 1843. Founder of the Republican Party and presidential candidate in 1856, he was a Union general and Senator from California. A California Gold Rush millionaire, he lost most of his fortune in bad business investments.

John Wesley Powell, the noted geologist who explored the Colorado River, was honored on a 6-cent stamp issued August 1, 1969. Powell led an 1869 expedition down the Green and Colorado Rivers, a 1,000-mile, four-months' journey. He is now regarded as the father of the US Geological Survey, the Reclamation Service of the Interior Department, and the Bureau of American Ethnology of the Smithsonian Institution.

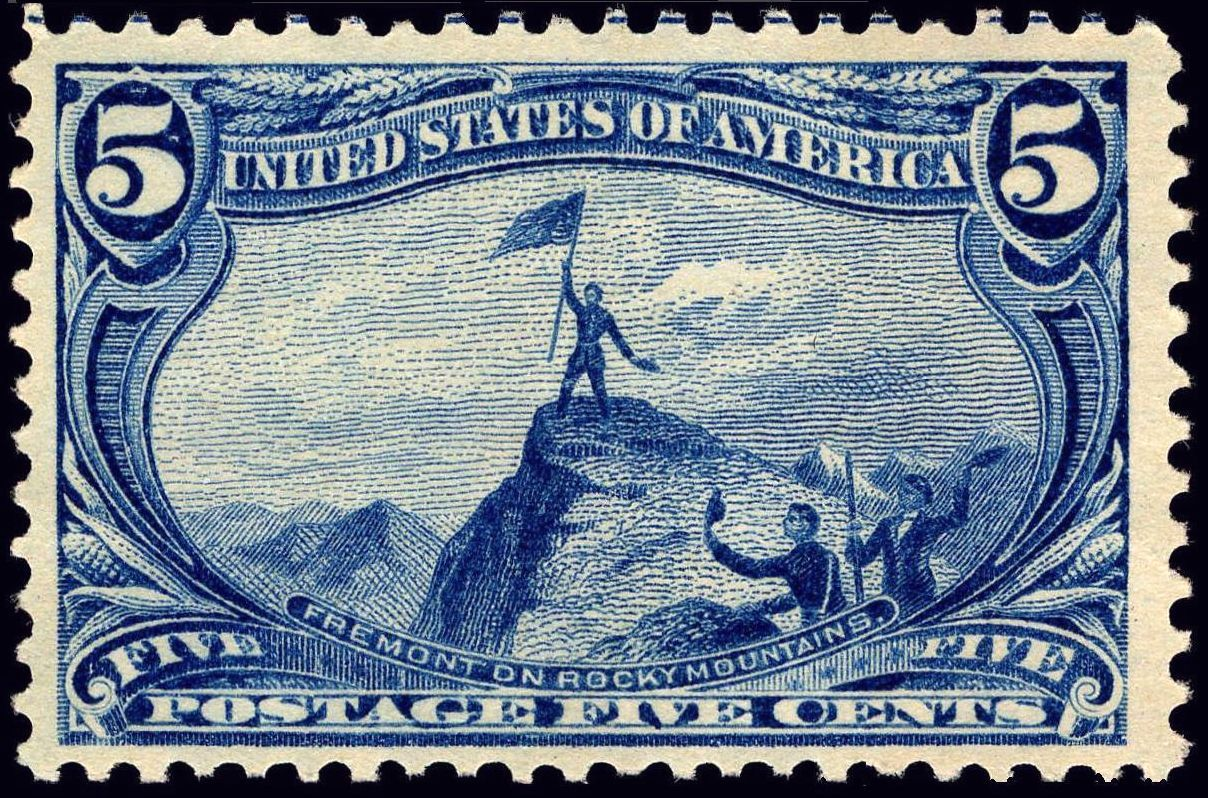
John C. Frémont, Rockies 1898 issue

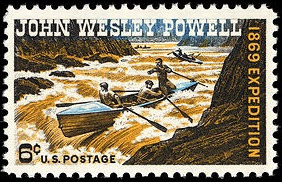
John Wesley Powell, Green and Colorado Rivers 1968 issue

== See also ==
- Territories of the United States
- Territorial evolution of the United States
- United States territorial acquisitions
- History of Virginia on stamps
- Puerto Rico on stamps
- History of the United States on stamps (category)
- Maps on stamps (category)
- U.S. Postage stamp locator

== Bibliography ==
- Arago: people, postage & the post, Philately, National Postal Museum online.
- Handlin, Oscar and Lillian Handlin, Liberty in Expansion: 1760–1850. ISBN 0-06-039092-1
- Scott 2013 Specialized Catalogue of United States Stamps & Covers. 2012. ISBN 0-89487-475-6,
- Woods, Randall Bennett, and Wilard B. Gatewood "The American Experience: A Concise History", Prentice Hall, publishers. ISBN 978-0-534-16955-8

Postal

- Bianculli, Anthony J., Railroad history on American postage stamps 2004.
- Bloomgarden, Henry S., American history through commemorative stamps 1969.
- Deaton, Charles W., The great Texas stamp collection 2012.
- Renfeld, Fred. Commemorative Stamps of the U.S.A.: an illustrated history of our country 1954.
- Woreck, Michael and Jordan Worek. An American history album: the story of the United States told through stamps 2008.
