= The Hits & More =

Greatest hits album by Melissa Tkautz
- Released: 10 August 2012
- Recorded: 1991–2012
- Genre: Pop; dance; Europop
- Label: Melissa Tkautz

Melissa Tkautz chronology
| Lost & Found (2005) | The Hits & More (2012) |

The Hits & More is a greatest hits album by Melissa Tkautz. The album comes 21 years after her ARIA Award winning, number one single, "Read My Lips" was released.

The album includes tracks from Tkautz's entire career as well as new tracks, "Not Enough", "Fake it Good" and "Take Me Away". The album was released on 10 August 2012.

== Promotions ==
On 9 July 2012, Tkautz released a 1-minute, 30 second promotional video for the album, composed of video clips from throughout her career to the music of "Something About You".

Throughout August, Tkautz performed a number of tracks live on TV in early August 2012, including "Sexy (Is the Word)" on "The Morning Show" on 7 August and "Read My Lips" on "The Late News" on 10 August.

Tkautz toured the album across Australia in late 2012. "A lot of my older tracks are quite poppy and I find this is very much up with the times in terms of what is going on in the clubs," Melissa says.

== Track listing ==
1. "Read My Lips" – 3:41
2. "Skin to Skin" – 3:46
3. "My House" – 3:42
4. "Is It?" – 4:03
5. "The Glamorous Life" "3:19
6. "All I Want" – 3:34
7. "Easily Affected" – 3:58
8. "I Want Your Love" (Nick Skitz feat. Melissa Tkautz) – 3:12
9. "Something About You" (Nick Jay feat. Melissa Tkautz) – 3:53
10. "Not Enough" – 3:22
11. "Fake it Good" – 2:52
12. "Take Me Away" – 3:31
13. "Sexy (Is the Word) 2005" – 4:08
14. "The Glamorous Life" (D.O.N.S. remix) – 5:00
15. "Read My Lips" (12" version) – 6:01
16. "Sexy is the Word" (12" version) – 6:04
17. "Skin to Skin" (12" version) – 6:38
18. "Is It?" (12" version) – 5:01
19. "Easily Affected" (12" version) – 5:46

== Release history ==
| Region | Date | Format | Label |
|---|---|---|---|
| Australia | 10 August 2012 | Digital Download | Melissa Tkautz |
