= Intimate (Toni Pearen album) =

Studio album by Toni Pearen
- Released: 28 November 1994
- Recorded: 1992–93
- Genre: Pop, dance-pop
- Length: 50:48
- Label: Mushroom
- Producer: Neil Davidge; Neal Slateford; Peter Blyton; Robyn Smith

Singles from Intimate
- 1. "In Your Room" Released: November 1992; 2. "I Want You" Released: April 1993; 3. "Walkaway Lover" Released: October 1994; 4. "Joy" Released: March 1995

Intimate (also known by its full title Toni Pearen's Intimate Album) is the debut album by Australian actress and singer Toni Pearen. Recorded throughout 1992 to 1993 and released in 1994, the album spawned two top ten singles and a third top forty single. At the time her music career commenced, Pearen had been a popular cast member of the Australian drama series E Street. She was one of many Australian actresses who ventured into a music career, following the success of Kylie Minogue, as well as Dannii Minogue and Pearen's E Street co-star, Melissa Tkautz, who scored a successful number one hit as well as other popular songs in the early '90s.

Four singles were released from Intimate. The first single "In Your Room", peaked at number ten on the ARIA Charts in January 1993. The second single "I Want You" also peaked at number ten, in May 1993. A third single, "Walkaway Lover", was released in October 1994, peaking at number thirty-five in December. The fourth and final single "Joy" was released in March 1995 and peaked at number seventy-one during the same month. The album itself peaked at number fifty-six on its debut on the ARIA Albums Chart dated week ending 11 December 1994.

So far, this is the only album released by Pearen as she later became a television personality. She did, however, contribute some songs to the soundtrack of the 1995 film All Men Are Liars, which she also starred in.

At the 1994 ARIA Music Awards, "I Want You" was nominated for the Best Pop Release.

== Track listing ==
| No. | Title | Writer(s) | Length |
|---|---|---|---|
| 1. | "Intimate" | Steve Kipler, John L Parker | 4:20 |
| 2. | "If I Ever Lose This Heaven" | Pam Sawyer, Leon Ware | 4:45 |
| 3. | " I Want You" | Jenn Forbes, P. Northcote | 4:15 |
| 4. | "Joy" | Toni Pearen, Ashley Cadell | 3:58 |
| 5. | "Desperately" | Haynes, Sidari | 4:17 |
| 6. | "Halfway to Heaven" | Hal David, Franne Golde, Nicky Holland | 4:30 |
| 7. | "In Your Room" | Oliver Leiber, John Shanks, Ellen Shipley | 4:24 |
| 8. | "Walkaway Lover" | P. Crosbie & Y. Olugbo | 4:19 |
| 9. | "Raining in My Heart" | K. Hill, Sam McNally, Tracey Yarad | 4:54 |
| 10. | "Looking at You" | Forbes, Northcote | 3:46 |
| 11. | "Crazy for Your Love" | Pearen, Cadell | 4:12 |
| 12. | "In Your Room" (12" mix) | Leiber, Shanks, Shipley | 5:08 |
| 13. | "Joy" (World Peace mix) | Pearen, Cadell | 6:40 |
| 14. | "If You Ever Lose This Heaven" (Club Reprise) | Sawyer, Ware | 3:12 |
| 15. | "Joy" (Acapella) (Japanese bonus track) | Pearen, Cadell |

== Charts ==
Chart performance for Intimate
| Chart (1994) | Peak position |
|---|---|
| Australian Albums (ARIA) | 56 |
