= Federation (miniseries) =

Federation is a 1998 documentary film in three parts on the history behind the union of six colonies into the Commonwealth of Australia.

== The film ==
The film was funded by the ABC and Film Australia, originally broadcast as a 3-part miniseries, each of 55 minutes, in the programme slot The Big Picture.

Presentation largely consists of interleaving historical photographs and political cartoons, modern film clips and "talking heads", their faces rarely shown for more than five seconds, then talking over relevant graphics. Dates and statistics are given second place to anecdotes and character assessments of the principle protagonists.

The locomotive with its passenger-less carriages, seen frequently in continuity shots, is an "F-class" F251 built by Perry Engineering, which entered service with the South Australian Railways in 1922 and is now operated by SteamRanger, maintenance schedule permitting.

== Selected credits ==
- Director: Ian Munro
- Producer: Anna Grieve
- Writer: Sue Castrique
- Editor: Stewart Young
- Narrator: John Doyle
- Director of Photography: Kim Batterham
- Composer: Martin Friedel
- Archival Researcher: Jeannine Baker
- Historical Consultant: Helen Irving
- Voices (part 1 - The Land): Leo McKern, Kirk Alexander, Peter Browne, Leslie Dayman, Gary Files, Cornelia Frances, Chris Haywood, Geoff Kelso, Deborah Kennedy, Shane McNamara, Peter O'Brien, Kelton Pell, Duncan Piney, Ken Radley, Doug Scroope, Rob Steele, Alan Tobin, William Zappa.
- Commentary (part 1): Greg Craven, John Bannon, Helen Irving (political historian), John Hirst, Mick Dodson, Ann Curthoys, Peter Love (labour historian), plus an Echuca local historian, a grandson of Fred T. Derham and granddaughters of Henry Parkes and Alfred Deakin (Judith Harley),
- Voices (part 2 - The People): Leo McKern, Mary Acres, Kirk Alexander, Peter Browne, Brad Byquar, Max Cullen, Leslie Dayman, Gary Files, Cornelia Frances, Kate Gorman, Shane McNamara, Peter O'Brien, Kelton Pell, Duncan Piney, Richard Piper, Lia Scallon, Doug Scroope, Rob Steele, Sigrid Thornton, William Zappa
- Commentary (part 2): John Bannon, Geoffrey Bolton (historian), Greg Craven, Ann Curthoys, Mick Dodson, Helen Irving, and also a great grandson of Alexander Sloane, a grandson of Edmund Barton, granddaughters of Laura Harris (Aboriginal activist), Alfred Deakin and George Reid (Anne Fairbairn), a veteran member of WCTU, Henry J. Rankine (Ngarrindjeri elder), Peter Yu (executive director, Kimberley Land Council), and Banjo Woorunmurra, a (Bunuba elder),
- Voices (part 3 - The Nation): Elizabeth Alexander, Kirk Alexander, Peter Browne, Leslie Dayman, Gary Files, Geoff Kelso, Shane McNamara, Peter O'Brien, Duncan Piney, Richard Piper, Doug Scroope, John Sheerin, Rob Steele, Henry Szeps, Anthony Wong, William Zappa.
- Commentary (part 3): John Bannon, Geoffrey Bolton, Greg Craven, Mick Dodson, Anne Fairbairn, John Hirst, Judith Harley, Helen Irving

== Recognition ==
- AWGIE award 1998

== Home release ==
A DVD of the three-part series was released by Umbrella Entertainment in 2012. It is currently (2019) unavailable.
