= List of top 25 singles for 1993 in Australia =

Top 25 singles of 1993 < 1992 1994 >

Other Australian top charts for 1993
- top 25 albums
- Triple J Hottest 100

Australian number-one charts of 1993
- albums
- singles

The following lists the top 100 singles of 1993 in Australia from the Australian Recording Industry Association (ARIA) End of Year Singles Chart.

#	Title	Artist	Highest pos. reached	Weeks at No. 1
1.	"I'd Do Anything for Love (But I Won't Do That)"	Meat Loaf	1	8
2.	"I Will Always Love You"	Whitney Houston	1	10 (Note: "I Will Always Love You" by Whitney Houston entered the ARIA Top 50 singles chart in early December 1992 and peaked at #1 for ten weeks from 20 December, it was in the Top 50 until May 1993, for a total of 23 weeks.)
3.	"You Don't Treat Me No Good"	Sonia Dada	1	4
4.	"Sweat (A La La La La Long)"	Inner Circle	2	(Note: "Sweat (A La La La La Long)" entered the ARIA Top 50 singles chart in July 1993 and from August remained in the Top 10 for 14 weeks until November, it was in the Top 50 for a total of 26 weeks.)
5.	"(I Can't Help) Falling in Love with You"	UB40	1	7
6.	"Informer"	Snow	1	5
7.	"What's Up"	4 Non Blondes	2	
8.	"Cat's in the Cradle"	Ugly Kid Joe	1	1
9.	"All That She Wants"	Ace of Base	1	3
10.	"Please Forgive Me"	Bryan Adams	1	3 (Note: "Please Forgive Me" entered the ARIA Top 50 singles chart in November 1993 and peaked at #1 for four weeks to January 1994 and remained in the Top 50 until March for a total of 18 weeks.)
11.	"Are You Gonna Go My Way"	Lenny Kravitz	1	6
12.	"Gimme Little Sign"	Peter Andre	3	
13.	"The River of Dreams"	Billy Joel	1	1
14.	"December, 1963 (Oh, What a Night)"	The Four Seasons	2	(Note: "December 1963 (Oh, What a Night)" entered the Kent Music Report singles chart in 1976 and peaked at #2. It entered the ARIA Top 50 singles chart in late November 1992 and peaked at #3 in March 1993, it remained in the Top 50 until May for a total of 25 weeks.)
15.	"Freak Me"	Silk	3	
16.	"Mr. Vain"	Culture Beat	1	2
17.	"That's the Way Love Goes"	Janet Jackson	1	1
18.	"Boom! Shake the Room"	Jazzy Jeff & the Fresh Prince	1	1 (Note: "Boom! Shake the Room" entered the ARIA Top 50 singles chart in October 1993 and peaked at #1 for one week in January 1994, it was in the Top 50 for a total of 21 weeks.)
19.	"Can't Get Enough of Your Love"	Taylor Dayne	2	
20.	"Dreams"	Gabrielle	2	
21.	"If I Can't Have You"	Kim Wilde	3	
22.	"Stone Cold"	Jimmy Barnes	4	
23.	"I'm Easy"	Faith No More	1	2
24.	"How Do You Talk to an Angel"	The Heights	3	
25.	"Killing in the Name"	Rage Against the Machine	7	
26.	"Three Little Pigs"	Green Jellÿ	6	
27.	"Two Princes"	Spin Doctors	3	
28.	"Tears in Heaven / Layla"	Eric Clapton	7	
29.	"The Floor"	Johnny Gill	6	
30.	"No Limit"	2 Unlimited	7	
31.	"House of Love"	East 17	5	
32.	"Give in to Me"	Michael Jackson	4	
33.	"Everybody Hurts"	R.E.M.	6	
34.	"Oh Carolina"	Shaggy	5	
35.	"The Key the Secret"	Urban Cookie Collective	4	
36.	"November Rain"	Guns N' Roses	5	
37.	"Tease Me"	Chaka Demus & Pliers	5	
38.	"The Hitman"	AB Logic	6	
39.	"Rain"	Madonna	5	
40.	"You Ain't Thinking (About Me)"	Sonia Dada	3	
41.	"If I Ever Fall in Love"	Shai	4	
42.	"Dreamlover"	Mariah Carey	7	
43.	"This Is It"	Dannii	13	
44.	"The Right Kind of Love"	Jeremy Jordan	5	
45.	"Runaway Train"	Soul Asylum	11	
46.	"Deep"	East 17	7	
47.	"Bed of Roses"	Bon Jovi	10	
48.	"People Everyday"	Arrested Development	6	
49.	"Soul to Squeeze"	Red Hot Chili Peppers	9	
50.	"A Whole New World (Aladdin's Theme)"	Peabo Bryson and Regina Belle	10	
51.	"Rump Shaker"	Wreckx-n-Effect	10	
52.	"I Want You"	Toni Pearen	10	
53.	"Lemon"	U2	6	
54.	"Believe"	Lenny Kravitz	8	
55.	"Jump!"	The Movement	7	
56.	"West End Girls"	East 17	4	
57.	"Tribal Dance"	2 Unlimited	5	
58.	"You Were There"	Southern Sons	6	
59.	"Mr. Wendal"	Arrested Development	7	
60.	"If I Had No Loot"	Tony! Toni! Toné!	12	
61.	"I'm Every Woman"	Whitney Houston	11	
62.	"Funky Junky"	Peter Andre	13	
63.	"In the Still of the Nite (I'll Remember)"	Boyz II Men	11	
64.	"Gangsta"	Bell Biv DeVoe	17	
65.	"You're So Vain"	Chocolate Starfish	11	
66.	"Ain't No Love (Ain't No Use)"	Sub Sub feat. Melanie Williams	11	
67.	"In These Arms"	Bon Jovi	10	
68.	"Happy Birthday Helen"	Things of Stone and Wood	9	
69.	"Shoop"	Salt-N-Pepa	2	
70.	"Have I Told You Lately"	Rod Stewart	12	
71.	"Go West"	Pet Shop Boys	10	
72.	"Holy Grail"	Hunters & Collectors	20	
73.	"Would I Lie to You?"	Charles & Eddie	3	
74.	"Tequila"	A.L.T. and the Lost Civilization	8	
75.	"Seemed Like a Good Idea at the Time"	John Farnham	16	
76.	"Wherever I May Roam"	Metallica	14	
77.	"Never Miss Your Water"	Diesel	12	
78.	"What Is Love"	Haddaway	12	
79.	"Big Gun"	AC/DC	19	
80.	"If"	Janet Jackson	18	
81.	"Almost Unreal"	Roxette	17	
82.	"Push th' Little Daisies"	Ween	18	
83.	"The Weight"	Jimmy Barnes and The Badloves	6	
84.	"She Kissed Me"	Terence Trent D'Arby	9	
85.	"No Rain"	Blind Melon	8	
86.	"Somebody Dance with Me"	DJ BoBo	13	
87.	"Accidently Kelly Street"	Frente!	4	
88.	"Bad Boys"	Inner Circle	25	
89.	"Got to Get It"	Culture Beat	7	
90.	"Sweet Lullaby"	Deep Forest	7	
91.	"Creep"	Radiohead	6	
92.	"Can You Forgive Her?"	Pet Shop Boys	17	
93.	"Right Here"	SWV	20	
94.	"Open Your Mind"	U.S.U.R.A.	29	
95.	"Shivers"	The Screaming Jets	19	
96.	"Come Undone"	Duran Duran	19	
97.	"Jump Around"	House of Pain	15	
98.	"In Your Room"	Toni Pearen	10	
99.	"Looking Through Patient Eyes"	P.M. Dawn	20	
100.	"Sleeping Satellite"	Tasmin Archer	14	

Peak chart positions are from the ARIA Charts, overall position on the End of Year Chart is calculated by ARIA based on the number of weeks and position that the records reach within the Top 50 singles for each week during 1993.
