= I Want You (Toni Pearen song) =

1993 single by Toni Pearen

Single by Toni Pearen

from the album Intimate
- B-side: "I Got the Vibe"
- Released: 5 April 1993
- Genre: Pop
- Length: 4:15
- Label: Mushroom
- Songwriter(s): Jenn Forbes, P. Northcote
- Producer(s): Peter Blyton

Toni Pearen singles chronology
"In Your Room" (1992)	"I Want You" (1993)	"Walkaway Lover" (1994)

"I Want You" is the second single released by Australian actress and singer Toni Pearen. Released in March 1993, the song peaked at number 10 on the Australian ARIA Singles Chart on 23 May 1993, spending 16 weeks in the top 50, and was certified gold during its 10th week in the top 20. "I Want You" garnered Toni Pearen an ARIA Award nomination for Best Pop Release in 1994, her only ARIA nomination.

== Background ==
Toni Pearen had launched her music career in 1992 with the release of her top-10 debut single "In Your Room", after having been a popular cast member of the Australian drama series E Street. After the success her fellow E Street co-star Melissa Tkautz had with her number one single "Read My Lips", Pearen was quickly signed to Mushroom Records and started recording songs.

== Track listings ==
Australian CD single

1. "I Want You"
2. "I Got the Vibe"

Australian CD digipak and cassette single

A1. "I Want You"
A2. "I Got the Vibe"
B1. "I Want You" (extended mix)
B2. "I Want You" (extended dub)

== Charts ==
=== Weekly charts ===
Chart (1993)	Peak position
Australia (ARIA)	10

=== Year-end charts ===
Chart (1993)	Position
Australia (ARIA)	52

== Certifications ==
Region	Certification	Certified units/sales
Australia (ARIA)	Gold	35,000^{^}
^{^} Shipments figures based on certification alone.
