= Dabitum =

Babylonian slave notable for her letters

Dabitum, also transliterated as Dabîtum or Dabītum, was a slave-girl who lived in Sippar during the Old Babylonian period (c. 1900–1600 BC). She is known today for her letter to her slave master concerning a miscarriage, both for the inherent tragedy of the letter and for its striking stylistic features. Her life is otherwise completely unknown; it is possible that she is the same person as another Dabitum who was a former slave in the reign of Hammurabi (c. 1792–1750 BC) and is attested in legal documents from Sippar.

== Biography ==
Dabitum was a slave-girl who lived in Sippar during the Old Babylonian period (c. 1900–1600 BC), around the time of the Babylonian kings Hammurabi (c. 1792–1750 BC) and Samsu-iluna (1750–1712 BC). Her name means "she-bear"; a rare name for a slave since animal names were typically used only by free people.

Dabitum became pregnant as a young woman, likely as the result of being raped by her slave master. By the time she had been pregnant for seven months, Dabitum had not felt the child move in a month and believed it to be dead. She wrote a letter, either herself or with the help of a scribe, to the absent father in order to communicate the distressing news and beg for help. Considering her status in society and the subject matter, Dabitum probably had to go to great lengths in order to find a scribe willing to write the message. The Assyriologist A. Leo Oppenheim translated Dabitum's letter, which has received the modern designation TIM 1 15, as follows in 1967:

Tell my master: Your slave girl Dabītum sends the following message:
What I have told you now has happened to me: For seven months this (unborn) child was in my body, but for a month now the child has been dead and nobody wants to take care of me. May it please my master (to do something) lest I die. Come visit me and let me see the face of my master!
[Large gap] Why did no present from you arrive for me? And if I have to die, let me die after I have seen again the face of my master!

Miscarriages were likely as emotionally devastating in ancient Mesopotamia as they are today. The language used in the letter indicates that Dabitum was devastated over the loss of her child and not just worried about her own fate; despite the child not having been born, she notably used the word šerrum ("child") rather than the otherwise common medical term kūbu ("fetus"). Dabitum's letter is stylistically highly unusual. The letter ignores the standard ways of addressing the slave master with deference, skipping traditional polite introductory phrases. The phrase "What I have told you now has happened to me" is also startling in that it is a very rare example of a slave making herself into a knower and speaker.

The name Dabitum is also attested in two Old Babylonian legal documents from Sippar; though both of these documents concern the same person it is unknown if it is the same person as the Dabitum who experienced a miscarriage. These documents record that a man named Kalkatum married Dabitum, who was the adoptive daughter of a Nadītu (Note: A female Babylonian social class of elite independent women.) woman and almost certainly a former slave, in the fourth year of Hammurabi's reign (c. 1788 BC). Another document, written 24 years later (c. 1764 BC), establishes that the couple, still married, were childless and had adopted a daughter, Ahatani, to support them. (Note: Another unrelated Dabitum is also known, mentioned in a contract from Larsa in the Isin-Larsa period (which preceded the Old Babylonian period), who was the wife of a man named Sin-iqišam and the mother of the two sons Dan-Šubula and Aḫua-ibnišu.)

== Legacy ==
Dabitum's letter has been characterized by researchers as emotionally resonant and tragic. Dabitum's letter served as the basis for the novel Oannes (1980) by the Swedish author Tore Zetterholm, wherein she also appears as a character. Zetterholm was inspired to write the novel after having read the original letter on a visit to Baghdad. Dabitum also appears in the poem A Spring of Dreams at Wadi Jirm (1995) by Anne Fairbairn.
