= Fresh (Melissa Tkautz album) =

Studio album by Melissa Tkautz
- Released: 15 June 1992
- Recorded: 1991–1992
- Genre: Pop; dance; Europop
- Label: Phantom Records & Westside Records
- Producer: Leon Berger, Doug Henderson, Alston Koch

Melissa Tkautz chronology
Fresh (1992)	Lost & Found (2005)

Singles from Fresh
- 1. "Read My Lips" Released: 20 May 1991; 2. "Sexy (Is the Word)" Released: September 1991; 3. "Skin to Skin" Released: April 1992; 4. "My House" Released: November 1992

Fresh is the debut studio album by Australian actress, singer and model Melissa Tkautz, released in June 1992 and peaked at number 15 on the ARIA Charts.

== Background and release ==
In 1991, playing the role of Nikki Spencer on Channel 10's drama soap, E Street, Tkautz embarked on a recording career. Melissa's debut single, "Read My Lips", reached number 1 on the Australian singles chart., was certified platinum and became the sixth highest-selling single of 1991 in Australia. Tkautz's next single, "Sexy (Is The Word)", reached number 3, was certified gold, and was the fifty-seventh highest-selling single of 1991 in Australia. Her third single, 1992's "Skin to Skin", peaked at number 16 in Australia.

Following the release of these three singles, the album Fresh was released in June 1992. The album did not fare as well as the singles, peaking at number 15 in Australia, and spending only seven weeks in the top 100. A fourth single from the album, "My House", was issued in November 1992, but peaked outside the top 100 at number 119.

== Track listing ==
1. "Sexy (Is the Word)"
2. "Let's Get Pumping"
3. "My Imagination"
4. "Skin to Skin"
5. "If We Live Forever"
6. "Read My Lips"
7. "Tonight's The Night"
8. "My House"
9. "Something About You"
10. "Ain't No Saint"

== Charts ==
Chart (1992)	Peak position
Australian Albums (ARIA)	15
