= Sexy (Is the Word) =

1991 single by Melissa

Single by Melissa

from the album Fresh
- B-side: "My Favourite Room"
- Released: September 1991
- Length: 3:35
- Label: Phonogram, Mercury
- Songwriters: Roy Nicolson, Leon Berger, Tony King
- Producers: Leon Berger, Doug Henderson, Alston Koch

Melissa singles chronology
"Read My Lips" (1991)	"Sexy (Is the Word)" (1991)	"Skin to Skin" (1992)

"Sexy (Is the Word)" is a song by Australian singer Melissa (Tkautz). It was released as her second single, following "Read My Lips". Like "Read My Lips", "Sexy (Is the Word)" was launched via the television series that Tkautz was starring in at the time, E Street. The song appears on her debut album, Fresh (1992).

== Music video ==
The music video for his single features Melissa in a number of guises. She is seen in hot pink lingerie and in a leather Jacket, cavorting with a large block of ice.

== 2005 re-recording ==
In 2005, Tkautz relaunched her music career with the album Lost and Found, which included two new versions of "Sexy (Is The Word)". These were contemporary remixes where new vocals were recorded, and whilst not released as a single, the song received much attention in nightclubs around Australia. There was a film clip released with this track to clubs which was a re-edited version of the original music video.

== Track listings ==
7-inch, CD, and cassette single

1. "Sexy (Is the Word)"
2. "My Favourite Room"

12-inch single

A1. "Sexy (Is the Word)" (12-inch Electric Laser remix)
B1. "My Favourite Room"
B2. "Sexy (Is the Word)"

== Charts ==
=== Weekly charts ===
Chart (1991)	Peak position
Australia (ARIA)	3

=== Year-end charts ===
Chart (1991)	Position
Australia (ARIA)	57

== Sales and certifications ==
Region	Certification	Certified units/sales
Australia (ARIA)	Gold	35,000^{^}
^{^} Shipments figures based on certification alone.
