= Joy (Toni Pearen song) =

Single by Toni Pearen

from the album Intimate
- Released: 6 March 1995 (Australia)
- Genre: Pop, Dance-pop
- Length: 3:58
- Label: Mushroom Records
- Songwriter(s): A Cadell, T Pearen

Toni Pearen singles chronology
"Walkaway Lover" (1994)	"Joy" (1995)

"Joy" is a pop/dance song performed by Australian actress/singer Toni Pearen. It was released in March 1995 as the fourth and final single from her debut album Intimate. "Joy" entered the ARIA top 100 singles chart on 19 March 1995 at #75, peaking at #71 the following week. "Joy" was released at a time when Pearen's music career was heading into decline. The album Intimate was unsuccessful and the previous single "Walkaway Lover" had charted lower than her first two singles, although it did make the top forty. "Joy" has so far been Toni Pearen's last single release.

Although Toni Pearen's music career had faltered by early-mid 1995, she did star in that year's successful comedy film All Men Are Liars, in which she played the lead singer of an all-female band as well as contributing some songs to the film's soundtrack.

== Track listing ==
CD and cassette single

1. "Joy"
2. "Joy" (Classic 12)
3. "Joy" (Master Mix)
4. "Joy" (Extended Single)
5. "Joy" (A Capella)
6. "Joy" (World Peace Mix)

== Charts ==
Chart (1995)	Peak position
Australia (ARIA)	71
