= In Your Room (Toni Pearen song) =

1992 singe by Toni Pearen

Single by Toni Pearen

from the album Intimate
- B-side: "Love Vibration"
- Released: 9 November 1992
- Genre: Pop
- Length: 4:24
- Label: Mushroom
- Songwriter(s): Oliver Leiber, John Shanks, Ellen Shipley
- Producer(s): Peter Blyton

Toni Pearen singles chronology
"In Your Room" (1992)	"I Want You" (1993)

"In Your Room" is a song by Australian actress and singer Toni Pearen, released in November 1992. The single debuted at number 54 on the Australian ARIA top 100 singles chart dated week ending 22 November 1992, and rose to its peak of number 10 week ending 17 January 1993. The single spent 17 weeks in the top 50, with 1 week spent out of the chart to re-enter at 50 the following week ending 21 March 1993 and 30 weeks in the top 100. It achieved an ARIA gold certification for shipments exceeding 35,000.

At the time her music career began, Pearen had been a popular cast member of Australian drama series E Street. Following in the footsteps of Kylie Minogue, several Australian female soap actresses launched a pop career, to varying degrees of success. Toni Pearen achieved two consecutive top ten hits in Australia, but subsequent singles and an album were less successful.

== Track listings ==
CD and cassette

1. "In Your Room" – 4:24
2. "Love Vibration" – 4:39

CD digipak single

1. "In Your Room"
2. "In Your Room (12-inch Remix)" – 5:09
3. "Love Vibration" – 4:39
4. "In Your Room (12-inch Dub)" – 5:11
5. "Love Vibration (Instrumental)" – 4:50

12-inch vinyl

1. A1 "In Your Room (12-inch Remix)" – 5:09
2. A2 "In Your Room (12-inch Instrumental)" – 5:09
3. B1 "Love Vibration" – 4:39
4. B2 "Love Vibration (Instrumental)" – 4:39

== Charts ==
=== Weekly charts ===
Chart (1993)	Peak position
Australia (ARIA)	10

=== Year-end charts ===
Chart (1993)	Position
Australia (ARIA)	98

== Certifications ==
Region	Certification	Certified units/sales
Australia (ARIA)	Gold	35,000^{^}
^{^} Shipments figures based on certification alone.
