= Lost & Found (Melissa Tkautz album) =

Studio album by Melissa Tkautz
- Released: 4 December 2005
- Recorded: The Base Studios, Melbourne 2005
- Genre: Pop; dance; Europop
- Length: 57:56
- Label: JRB Music; Distributed by Big Records
- Producer: Paul Wiltshire, Penny Clifford & Melissa Tkautz

Melissa Tkautz chronology
Fresh (1992)	Lost & Found (2005)	The Hits & More (2012)

Professional ratings
Review scores
Source	Rating
Ian Gould, Sydney Star Observer	(not rated) link

Lost & Found is the second studio album by Australian singer Melissa Tkautz, released in 2005.

== Background ==
In early 2005, Melissa Tkautz appeared at Sydney nightclub ARQ for the venue's Retrosexual theme night, where she sang reworked versions of her hit songs "Read My Lips" and "Sexy (Is The Word)". Following the performance, JRB Music & Management signed Tkautz to a new recording contract.

In the following months, Tkautz recorded her first new single in over ten years - a cover of the Prince-produced, Sheila E song, "The Glamorous Life" which debuted at Number 6 on both the ARIA Dance Chart and the ARIA Australasian Chart and reached Number 8 on the ARIA Club Chart.

The follow-up single "All I Want" was released in November 2005.

== Singles ==
- "The Glamorous Life" was the first single from the forthcoming album Lost & Found. After its Australian release on September 4, 2005, the single reached #31 on the ARIA Singles Chart, #6 on the ARIA Club Chart and #8 on the ARIA Dance Chart. The single also charted in Russia, reaching #20 on the Russian Chart Power Top 50.
- "All I Want" was the second single from Lost & Found, released on November 20, 2005. It reached #72 on the ARIA Singles Chart, but peaked at #10 on the ARIA Dance Chart, #19 on the ARIA Australasian Chart and #28 on the ARIA Club Chart.

== Track listing ==
1. "All I Want" – 5:30
2. "Southern Son" – 5:48
3. "Breakaway" – 4:54
4. "True Love" – 4:29
5. "The Glamorous Life" – 3:20
6. "Blink" – 7:09
7. "Waiting" – 4:22
8. "Lies" – 4:15
9. "Gotta Know" – 3:32
10. "Goodbye Daddy" – 3:25
11. "Sexy Is the Word 05*" (Radio Edit) – 4:09
12. "Sexy Is the Word 05*" (Club Version) – 7:09

=== Notes ===
1. M. Tkautz/Control/P.Wiltshire/Mushroom
2. Mushroom Music/Hebbes Music
3. Tkautz/Control/P.Wiltshire/Orient Pacific/R.Sedky/Standard
4. P.Wiltshire/Orient Pacific/R.Cattania/Control
5. J.Star/MCA
6. M.Tkautz/Control/D.Steele/Control
7. K.Minshull/Orient Pacific/P.Wiltshire/Mushroom
8. M.Tkautz/Control/P.Wiltshire/Orient Pacific/R.Sedky/Standard
9. M.Tkautz/Control/P.Wiltshire/Mushroom
10. M.Tkautz/Control/P.Wiltshire/Mushroom
11. A.King, R.Nilcholson, J.Berger, F.Koch./Orient Pacific
12. A.King, R.Nilcholson, J.Berger, F.Koch./Orient Pacific
- Sexy 05 Remixes by Steve Peach

== Credits ==
=== Personnel ===
- Guitar: Mario Riccioni, Robert John Sedky
- Backing vocal: Paul Wiltshire
