= The Crossing (1990 film) =

- Directed by: George Ogilvie
- Written by: Ranald Allan
- Produced by: Sue Seeary
- Starring: Russell Crowe; Robert Mammone; Danielle Spencer
- Cinematography: Jeff Darling
- Edited by: Henry Dangar
- Music by: Martin Armiger
- Production company: Beyond Production
- Distributed by: Beyond International Group
- Release date: 18 October 1990
- Running time: 91 minutes
- Country: Australia
- Language: English
- Box office: A$87,392

The Crossing is a 1990 Australian romantic drama film directed by George Ogilvie, produced by Sue Seeary and written by Ranald Allan. The film stars Russell Crowe, Robert Mammone and Danielle Spencer. The film was shot in the towns of Junee and Condobolin in New South Wales, Australia. The film was released in Australia on 18 October 1990. Russell Crowe was nominated for the Australian Film Institute Award for best actor while Jeff Darling was awarded for the best cinematography.

== Plot ==
The film is set in a small country town in the 1960s. Sam returns home from being away for 18 months to discover his former girlfriend, Meg, has moved on with their common friend, Johnny.

== Cast ==
- Russell Crowe as Johnny
- Robert Mammone as Sam
- Danielle Spencer as Meg
- Emily Lumbers as Jenny
- Rodney Bell as Shortly
- Ben Oxenbould as Heavyfoot
- Myles Collins as Stretch
- Marc Gray as Nort
- Megan Connolly as Kathleen
- John Blair as Billy
- Rani Lockland as Gail
- Lea-Ann Towler as Mandy
- Paul Robertson as Birdie
- George Whaley as Sid
- Jacquy Phillips as Marion
- Les Foxcroft as Pop
- Patrick Ward as Nev

== Music ==
- Martin Armiger – soundtrack composer
- Derek Williams – orchestrator, conductor

=== Soundtrack ===
An album produced by Martin Armiger was released in 1990 in Australia and Europe. "King of the Road" was released as the first single, and made the top ten in UK and Germany. A video for "Nature Boy" performed by Kate Ceberano was also created to promote the album.

"Dear Madam Barnum" by XTC was written for the film but ultimately not included. The song later appeared on the album Nonsuch.

Cummings, Stephen, 1954-; Ceberano, Kate; Armiger, Martin; Blakeley, Peter; Forbes, Jenni; Crowded House (Musical group); Proclaimers (Musical group); Tin Machine (Musical group); Cockroaches (Musical group); Chantoozies (Musical group); Derek Williams (orchestrator, conductor) (1990), The crossing : : original motion picture soundtrack, Regular Records

1. "Main Titles" by Martin Armiger
2. "King of the Road" by The Proclaimers
3. "Nature Boy" by Kate Ceberano
4. "She's Not There" by Crowded House
5. "For Your Love" by Peter Blakeley
6. "Betty Wrong" by Tin Machine
7. "The Chase" by Martin Armiger
8. "Here Comes That Feeling" by The Cockroaches
9. "My Boyfriend's Back" by The Chantoozies
10. "Nowhere To Run" by Stephen Cummings
11. "Love Letters" by Jenn Forbes
12. "Let's Dance" by The Cockroaches
13. "Love Theme" by Martin Armiger

== Production ==
Ranald Allan's script had been around for a number of years before being picked up by producer Sue Seeary, who managed to get the film up at Beyond International Group. It was their first feature film. Beyond's head of production, Al Clark did commission some re-writing. Production took place in and around Junee in November and December 1989.

== Box office ==
The Crossing grossed A$87,392 at the box office in Australia.
