= Walkaway Lover =

1994 single by Toni Pearen

Single by Toni Pearen

from the album Intimate
- Released: 10 October 1994
- Length: 4:19
- Label: Mushroom
- Songwriters: P. Crosbie; Y. Olugbo
- Producers: Neal Slateford; Neil Davidge

Toni Pearen singles chronology
"I Want You" (1993)	"Walkaway Lover" (1994)	"Joy" (1995)

"Walkaway Lover" is a song by Australian actress and singer Toni Pearen, released in October 1994 as the third single from her debut album Intimate. It peaked at number 35 in Australia and spent a total of 16 weeks in the top 100. The single was issued to coincide with the release of Intimate. The song is a cover of an album track by British singer Sonia.

== Track listing ==
CD and cassette single

1. "Walkaway Lover"
2. "Crazy for Your Love"

== Charts ==
Chart (1994)	Peak position
Australia (ARIA)	35
