= Leslie Dayman =

Australian actor (1933–2023)

- Leslie Dayman as Senior Sargeant George Sullivan in TV series E Street
- Born: Leslie Calmond Dayman; 19 January 1933; Footscray, Victoria, Australia
- Died: 20 October 2023 (aged 90)
- Other names: Les Dayman, Les Daymen
- Occupations: Actor; theatre director; narrator
- Years active: 1955–2008
- Notable work: Homicide; Prisoner; Sons and Daughters; E Street
- Parent: Les Dayman (father)

Leslie Calmond Dayman (19 January 1933 – 20 October 2023), credited as Les Dayman, was an Australian actor with a career spanning over 50 years, he was best known for his performances on television (serials and telemovies) and film, major small screen roles including Homicide, Prisoner, Sons and Daughters, and E Street.

== Early life ==
Leslie Calmond Dayman was born at Burn Brae Private Hospital in Footscray, Melbourne, on 19 January 1933. He was the son of Ria Dilks and Les "Bro" Dayman, whose address is given as 49 Napier Street, Footscray. His father was an Australian Rules footballer who played in both the South Australian Football League and Victorian Football League for the Port Adelaide Football Club and Footscray Football Club, and the baby's birth was announced in the Adelaide Advertiser.

== Career ==
Dayman started his career in theatre in 1955 and thereafter worked as an actor, director and narrator.

=== Television roles ===
Dayman was best known as a staple of the small screen in numerous serial roles. His television career began in 1964 in a TV film, and he appeared in the police procedural crime series Homicide as senior detective Bill Hudson in 104 episodes from 1966 to 1968.

In the 1980s, he was a regular cast member in three major Australian soap operas, all of which had international success: in Grundy Television's Sons and Daughters, he played Roger Carlyle, a ruthless shady businessman in episodes broadcast in 1984 and 1985; also in 1985, he starred in Prisoner, another Grundy production, as Geoff MacRae, one of three male prisoners in a 6-month story arc, and in E Street, he played Senior Sergeant George Sullivan for the series entire run from 1989 to 1993. opposite co-star Cecily Polson who played his wife Martha O'Dare.

=== Other credits ===
Other television appearances included Division 4, Bellamy, Cop Shop, Holiday Island, A Country Practice, Water Rats, Stingers, All Saints, Miss Fisher's Murder Mysteries and Sara Dane. Movie appearances include Weekend of Shadows, Gallipoli, Oscar and Lucinda, Footy Legends, Stepfather of the Bride, The Silence and Holy Smoke!. He acted in many South Australian Theatre Company productions and was its director from 1968 to 1969.

== Death ==
Leslie Dayman died on 20 October 2023.

== Filmography ==
=== Film ===
Year	Title	Role	Type
1964	Weather at Pinetop	Cal	TV movie
1974	Parent Teacher Interviews	The Parent / The Major	Short film
1976	Democracy		Short film
1977	How to Gromble a Flub	Performer	Documentary short film
1978	Weekend of Shadows	Riley	Feature film
1979	Pesticides: Friends or Foe		Documentary short film
1981	Gallipoli	Artillery Officer	Feature film
1981	Revenge		Short film
1981	Bush Corridors	Phil Green	Documentary short film
1983	With Prejudice	Shadbolt	Feature film
1983	Molly	Bill Ireland	Feature film
1984	Stanley: Every Home Should Have One	Second detective	Film
1985	I Can't Get Started	Sgt. Beale	Film
1986	The Last Frontier		TV movie
1987	Witch Hunt	David Rofe QC	TV movie
1997	Oscar and Lucinda	Glassworks Forman	Feature film
1998	In the Winter Dark	Minister	Film
1998	Poppy's Head	Poppy	Short film
1999	Holy Smoke!	Bill	Feature film
2000	Cheek to Cheek	George	Short film
2004	Out on the Tiles	Desmond	Short film
2006	The Silence	Edwin Hall	TV movie
2006	Footy Legends	Bob	Feature film
2006	Stepfather of the Bride	Grandpa Bob	TV movie

=== Television ===
Year	Title	Role	Type
1966–1968	Homicide	Roy Smith / Detective (later Senior Detective) Bill Hudson	TV series
1974	Division 4	Jimmy Morgan	TV series
1980	The Last Outlaw	Jack Lloyd	TV miniseries
1981	I Can Jump Puddles	Ted Wilson	TV series
1981	Holiday Island		TV series
1981	Bellamy	Peter Bellamy	TV series
1982	Sara Dane	Convict Leader	TV miniseries
1984	Bodyline	Bert Oldfield	TV miniseries
1985	Possession		TV series
1985	Special Squad	Mr. Fitzgerald	TV series
1984–1985	Sons and Daughters	Roger Carlyle	TV series
1984–1985	Prisoner	Geoff McRae	TV series
1987	Willing and Abel		TV series
1987	Rafferty's Rules	Sregrant Davis	TV series
1982–1988	A Country Practice	Blind Freddie / Warwick 'Wok' Larsen / Owen Butler / Phonse McGrath	TV series
1989–1993	E Street	Senior Sergeant George Sullivan	TV series
1995	Blue Murder	Commissioner Avery	TV miniseries
1997	Big Sky	Phillip	TV series
1997–1999	Water Rats	Ken Miles / Alan Rismore	TV series
1998	Federation	Voice	TV miniseries
2000	Stingers	Ossie Fischer	TV series
2002	Blue Heelers	Frank Jarvis	TV series
2000–2008	All Saints	Ray Hanson / Viv Woods / Kevin Goldman	TV series
