= Easily Affected =

Single by Melissa Tkautz
- Released: 21 October 2006 (Australia)
- Recorded: Europe
- Genre: Pop–Dance
- Label: Rajon Music Group
- Songwriter(s): Swedish team 2N
- Producer(s): Swedish team 2N

Melissa Tkautz singles chronology
"All I Want" (2005)	"Easily Affected" (2006)	"I Want Your Love" (2008)

"Easily Affected" is a song recorded by Australian singer Melissa Tkautz. It was written, produced and mixed by Swedish producers 2N. The song was released on October 21, 2006. as the first single from Tkautz's planned third album "Glamorous Life" that was to come out that December but was not released.

== Music video ==
Melissa Tkautz filmed the music video for Easily Affected in September 2006 at Sydney's Martin Place train station. The video features the singer parting with her love interest (played by Australian TV presenter James Tobin) and walking around the empty station at night. The video introduced Tkautz's new band (featuring an acoustic guitarist, backing singer and percussionist) for the first time.

== Formats and track listings ==
"Easily Affected" was released on 21 October 2006 in Australia on CD Single format. The single also featured B-side "Blink" and a previously unreleased D.O.N.S. remix of Melissa Tkautz's 2005 single "The Glamorous Life" in a slightly truncated edit of the mix issued on European 12" releases earlier in 2006.

- Australian CD Single
1. "Easily Affected"
2. "Easily Affected" (12" Extended Version)
3. "Blink"
4. "The Glamorous Life" (D.O.N.S. Remix)

== Official versions ==
- "Easily Affected" (Album Version)
- "Easily Affected" (12" Extended Version)

== Charts ==
Chart (2006)	Peak position
Australian ARIA Singles Chart	86
Australian Dance Chart	11
Australasian Chart	17
