= Westerdeich =

- Created by: Forrest Redlich
- Starring: Mariella Ahrens
- Country of origin: Germany
- No. of seasons: One
- No. of episodes: 37

Original release
- Release: 29 January 1995 – August 1995

Westerdeich is a German television series, based on the Belgian television series Wittekerke, which, in turn, was a remake of the Australian soap opera, E Street.

E Street originally aired from 1989 to 1993 on Network Ten, a commercial TV network in Australia, and was created by Forrest Redlich.

In English, Westerdeich literally means West-dike - but a more accurate translation would probably be Westside - this is also the name of the district in which the original series, E Street, was set.

The serial ran on the TV channel RTL from 29 January 1995, and was always shown weekly on Sunday evenings. There was one season containing 37 episodes.

Westerdeich was the second Australian soap opera to be re-formatted for a European audience by RTL. The first was in 1992; the Grundy Organisation soap opera, The Restless Years (1977–81), was remade as Gute Zeiten, Schlechte Zeiten (Good Times, Bad Times), and this series is still running as of December 2019.

Only 3 weeks before Westerdeich launched on RTL, another Australian soap opera remake launched on TV channel, Das Erste on January 3, 1995: Verbotene Liebe was the German version of Sons and Daughters (1982–87), which is another series produced by the Reg Grundy Organisation. Verbotene Liebe ran for ten years until it was cancelled in 2005.

== See also ==
- List of German television series
