= Melissa Tkautz =

Australian actress and musician (born 1974)

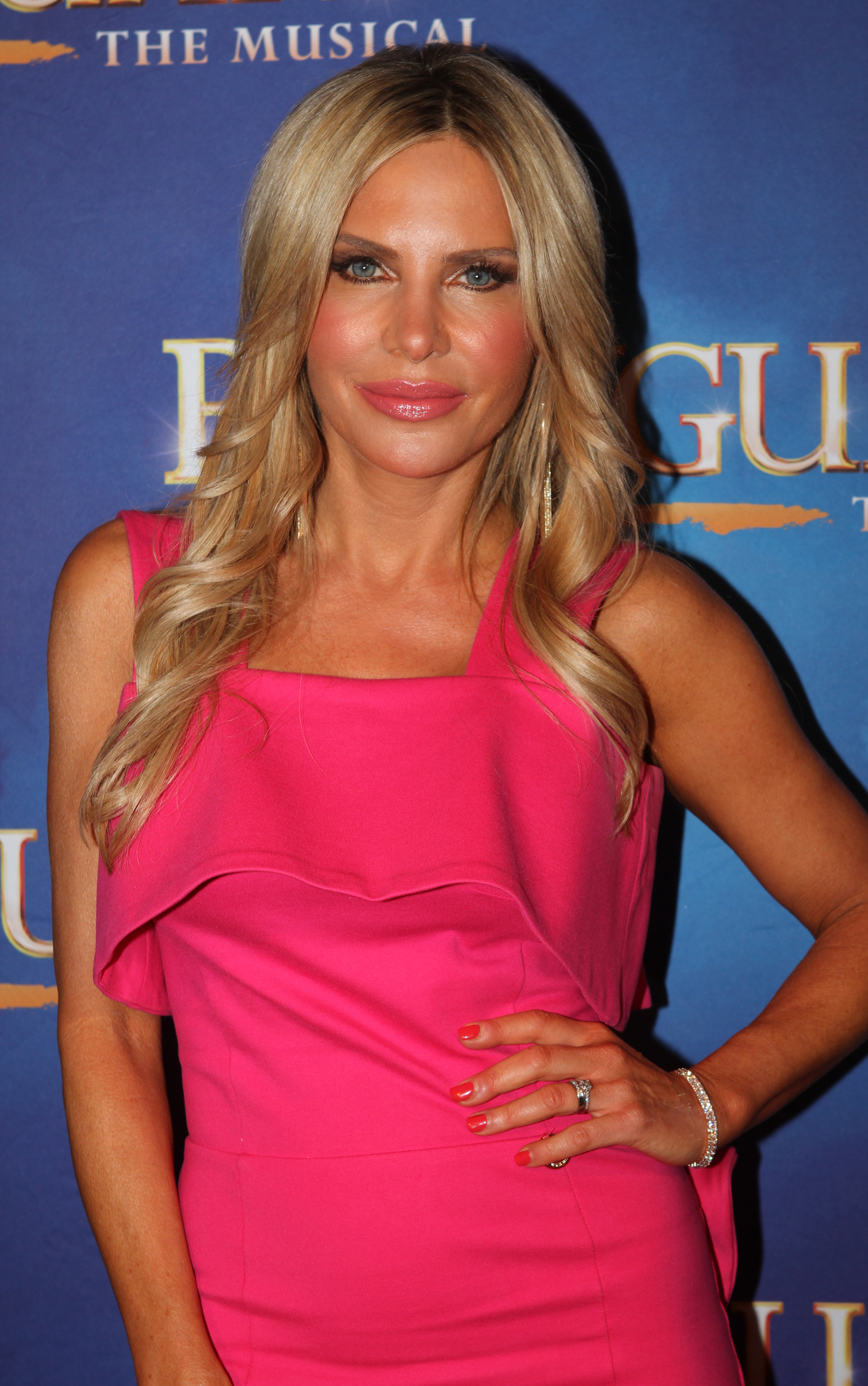

Background information
- Born: Melissa Natalie Tkautz; 24 January 1974 (age 52); Sydney, New South Wales, Australia
- Genres: Pop; dance; Europop
- Occupations: Actress; singer; model; presenter
- Instrument: Vocals
- Years active: 1989–present
- Labels: Phantom; Westside; JRB Music; Big; Rajon; Central Station; independent
- Known for: Cast member of The Real Housewives of Sydney

Melissa Natalie Tkautz (born 24 January 1974) is an Australian actress, singer, model, and presenter. She played the role of Nikki Spencer on the popular Australian TV soap opera E Street, from September 1990 to May 1993. During the early 1990s she had a solo music career, performing mononymously as Melissa, and had top 20 hits on the ARIA Singles Chart with "Read My Lips" (Number One, June 1991), "Sexy (Is the Word)" (No. 3, September) and "Skin to Skin" (No. 16, April 1992). "Read My Lips" also became a Number One hit in Sweden. Her debut album, Fresh, was released in June 1992 and peaked at No. 15 on the ARIA Albums Chart.

After her stint on E Street, Tkautz has appeared on Paradise Beach (1993–94), Pacific Drive (1996–98), All Saints (2001–02, 2004), Swift and Shift Couriers (2008, 2011) and Housos (2011). Her modelling career has included early child modelling, then as a teen in various pop entertainment magazines and from 1996 on fashion and men's magazines. On 4 December 2005, she issued her second solo album, Lost & Found, which provide a single, her cover version of "The Glamorous Life", which appeared in the top 40. In August 2011 she issued a compilation album, The Hits & More. In February 2009, Tkautz married finance businessman Kwesi Nicholas, her partner of five years; outside her performance career, she uses her married name, Melissa Nicholas.

== Television career ==
Tkautz was born in Sydney in 1974. According to Tkautz "I had very strict parents ... I wasn't allowed to do anything". Her father, Stefan Tkautz, is from Austria and her mother's family are Maltese. As a young child she studied drama, dance and singing; she began modelling and appearing in commercials. By the age of 17, she had appeared in over 160 television and print commercials. Some of these included ads for Qantas and Cadbury. She started modelling and then began acting in TV soap operas, Richmond Hill and Home & Away in the late 1980s. In 1989 she entered the Miss Teen Australia contest.

In September 1990, at the age of 16 years, Tkautz was cast in the role of Nikki Spencer on the popular Australian soap opera, E Street. She described her role, "Nikki is everything I don't want to be ... She smokes and she's really the sort of girl most parents would be horrified to have their daughters associating with". Tkautz soon became one of the show's main stars due to the popularity of her character. During this time, she attended the Australian Academy of Dramatic Art in Sydney, graduating in 1991. During that year she appeared on numerous Australian editions of magazine covers including Vogue, Cosmopolitan, TV Week, Smash Hits and Dolly. In 1991 readers of TV Hits voted her as the Hottest Woman on Earth. Tkautz also had a supporting role in the mini-series, The Girl from Tomorrow (1992).

Due to her popularity, the producers of E Street decided to have Tkautz record a song, which would be used in the show as part of a dream sequence, where her character imagines she is a pop star. This resulted in a recording career for Tkautz, she later recalled "I loved singing and I had trained as a singer, but everything happened so quickly, it was just a crazy whirlwind. One minute I'm watching E Street in my lounge room, the next minute I’m starring in E Street and I've got a number one single in the charts". However, in November 1991, due to the pressures of juggling two full-time careers, and a conflict with the producer, Forrest Redlich, Tkautz left E Street to concentrate on her music career. At the TV Week-sponsored Logie Awards she was nominated for Most Popular New Talent in 1992. By November 1992 Tkautz had returned to E Street. However, the network decided to axe the series in May 1993.

In 1993 and 1994, Tkautz appeared on Paradise Beach, playing Vanessa Campbell, the manipulative ex-girlfriend of Sean Hayden (played by Ingo Rademacher). Tkautz described her character "[s]he's a bit of a psycho, a real bitch ... She is nothing like Nicki in E Street. This one's a real troublemaker". In 1995, she had a role in Echo Point. In 1996, Tkautz joined the series Pacific Drive, where she played a model, Bethany Daniels. This role had a major effect on Tkautz, who played the first long-term HIV positive character on Australian TV. She described how "I did a lot of research on the role and a lot of charity work with HIV [patients], especially young kids who had contracted the disease". The series later gained a cult following. When Pacific Drive was cancelled in 1998, Tkautz joined the cast of Medivac (1998) as Nurse Evie Morrison. Tkautz later appeared in the series, All Saints (2001–02, 2004).

From 1996, Tkautz modelled for fashion and men's magazines Black+White, Australian Playboy, Ralph and FHM. In 2001 she appeared on the Myer Intimacy Apparel runway, modelling underwear, and followed with a stint at the Australian Fashion Week, that year.

In late 2008, Tkautz starred in Swift and Shift Couriers (created by the same crew that created Fat Pizza), which aired on SBS ONE. Filming took place in early 2008, with some episodes being shot in Thailand and Egypt. The first season had eight episodes that aired on TV during October–November 2008. She returned for a second season in 2011. Tkautz was also a guest star in controversial comedy series, Housos (from October 2011) and residents of housing commission units wanted the show banned. In May 2012, Tkautz was interviewed by Sonia Kruger and David Campbell on Mornings and described her career after E Street in the segment, "Where Are They Now?".

On 22 July 2016, it was announced Tkautz would be one of seven women appearing on the first season of The Real Housewives of Sydney.

2026 stylist and designer on ch 9 budget battlers

== Music career ==
Tkautz was signed to Westside Records, a label created by E Street's producers, and recorded her debut single, "Read My Lips". Redlich described why Tkautz was chosen ahead of her fellow actresses "I thought it was too raunchy for Toni Pearen and too teeny-bopper for Alyssa-Jane Cook". It was promoted via the show and released in May 1991, which reached the number-one position on the ARIA Singles Chart in July. The track was written by Tony King and Roy Nicolson, and was produced by Leon Berger. At the ARIA Music Awards of 1992 it won Highest Selling Single for the previous year. The song was parodied by Gina Riley on the comedy TV series, Fast Forward, as "Pout Your Lips". The single's B-side is "Say Goodbye" and was written by Berger, Alston Koch and Doug Henderson. Since 1991, Tkautz has re-recorded "Read My Lips" twice: the first version as the "Read My Lips (Electro Pushers Remix)", which was to be included as a bonus track on her proposed third album, Glamorous Life; and the second version as the "Read My Lips (Neon Stereo Remix)", which was performed live by Tkautz on Channel 7's The Morning Show.

Tkautz' second single from her debut album, "Sexy (Is the Word)", was issued in September 1991 and peaked at No. 3. It was written by Berger, King and Nicholson and produced by Berger, Koch and Henderson. She performed the track at the 1991 Rugby League Grand Final. At the end of that year Tkautz toured nationally as a support act on American dance-pop and hip hop group, C+C Music Factory's Australian Tour. Her third single, "Skin to Skin", appeared in April the next year, which reached No. 16, and was written and produced by the same team as "Sexy (Is the Word)". In June that year, having left E Street, Tkautz released her debut album, Fresh, which peaked at No. 15 on the ARIA Albums Chart. Tkautz promoted the album by a national tour, a further single, "Is It...?", was issued in July 1993 and reached the top 40, but a proposed second album was shelved and Tkautz refocused on her acting career.

In September 2005, Tkautz released a new single, a cover version of "The Glamorous Life", a 1984 song by Sheila E and written by Prince, which peaked at No. 31 on the ARIA Singles Chart. Her second album, Lost & Found, was issued on 4 December that year. Also that year, she re-recorded "Sexy (Is the Word)", which was included as a bonus track on Lost & Found. Tkautz travelled to Sweden in early 2006 to work with 2N and while there she recorded her next single, "Easily Affected", and "Not Enough". Her version of "The Glamorous Life" had some success internationally. It was released in Germany, Austria, Switzerland, Poland, South Africa, Sweden, Russia, Dubai and UAE, and Canada. In February 2008 she performed "Easily Affected", "True Love", "Read My Lips (Neon Stereo Remix)" and her new single, "I Want Your Love" at the Sydney Gay and Lesbian Mardi Gras Fair Day.

In January 2012, Australian comedian Sam Kekovich released a music video as an ad for Australian lamb meat, which was a rendition of Aqua's hit "Barbie Girl"; it featured vocals by Tkautz and an appearance by hip-hop dance and pop music group, Justice Crew. Meat and Livestock Australia's marketing manager, Andrew Cox, declared "[i]t's the most successful lamb campaign ever in terms of lamb sales ... people were able to share our 'Barbie Girl' song on Facebook and Twitter". In August that year Tkautz issued a compilation album, The Hits & More, and followed with a tour promoting its appearance.

Tkautz released the single "The Key" in May 2017.

== Personal life ==
In 1999, her father, Stefan, died of cancer; she co-wrote the track "Goodbye Daddy" (with Paul Wiltshire) from Lost & Found in his honour. In December 2006, Tkautz told Woman's Day that she had been in love with her E Street co-star Simon Baker; the relationship ended as "she wanted a long-term commitment but he was not at that stage of his life"; and then with Marcus Graham who "betrayed her after four months". Baker had also appeared in the music video for her debut single, "Read My Lips". In February 2009, Tkautz married finance businessman Kwesi Nicholas, her partner of five years. She uses her married name, Melissa Nicholas, outside her professional career. Together they have two children.

== Filmography ==
=== Film ===
Title	Year	Role	Type
1999	Game Room	Lisa Summerfield	Feature film
2017	Boar	Sasha	Feature film
2021	The Possessed	Shania	Feature film

=== Television ===
Title	Year	Role	Type
1988	Richmond Hill	Guest role: Nicki	TV series, 1 episode
1990	Home and Away	Guest role: Sue	TV series, 1 episode
1990-91	E Street	Regular role: Nikki Spencer	TV series, 158 episodes
1991	Police Rescue	Guest role: Helen Catteau	TV series, 1 episode
1991	The Girl from Tomorrow	Recurring role: Maria	TV series, 3 episodes
1992	The Girl from Tomorrow II: Tomorrow's End	Recurring role: Maria	TV series
1993-94	Paradise Beach	Recurring role: Vanessa Campbell	TV series
1995	Echo Point	Recurring role: Jules	TV series, 17 episodes
1995-98	Pacific Drive	Regular role: Bethany Daniels	TV series
1996	Medivac	Regular role: Evie Morrison	TV series, 13 episodes
2001	All Saints	Recurring role: Andrea Smart	TV series, 6 episodes
2003	Pizza	Guest role: Chantelle	SBS TV series, 1 episode
2004	All Saints	Guest role	TV series, 1 episode
2004	110% Tony Squires	Guest	TV series, 1 episode
2007	Where Are They Now?	Herself (with E Street cast – Bruce Samazan, Marcus Graham, Melissa Bell, Alyssa Jane Cook, Brooke 'Mikey' Anderson & Vince Martin	TV series, 1 episode
2008-2011	Swift and Shift Couriers	Regular role: Melissa Schembry	TV series, 18 episodes
2011	Housos	Regular role: Cheree	TV series, 9 episodes
2017	The Real Housewives of Sydney	Regular role: Herself	TV series, 12 episodes
2022	SAS Australia	Contestant	TV series, 14 episodes

== Discography ==
=== Albums ===
List of albums, with selected chart positions.
Title	Album details	Peak chart positions
Title	Album details	AUS
Fresh	Released: 15 June 1992; Label: Mercury Records, Phonogram Records (5123812); Formats: LP, CS, CD	15
Lost & Found	Released: 4 December 2005; Label: JRB Music, Big Records (BIGCD036); Formats: CD	—
The Hits & More	Released: 10 August 2012; Label: Melissa Tkautz; Formats: Music download	—
"—" denotes a recording that did not chart or was not released in that territory.

=== Singles ===
List of singles, with selected chart positions, showing year released and album name
Title	Year	Peak chart positions	Album
Title	Year	AUS	Album
"Read My Lips"	1991	1	Fresh
"Sexy (Is the Word)"	1991	3	Fresh
"Skin to Skin"	1992	16	Fresh
"My House"	1992	119	Fresh
"Is It...?"	1993	39	Non-album single
"The Glamorous Life"	2005	31	Lost & Found
"All I Want"	2005	72	Lost & Found
"Easily Affected"	2006	86	Non-album singles
"I Want Your Love" (Nick Skitz featuring Melissa Tkautz)	2008	60	Non-album singles
"Something About You" (Nick Jay featuring Melissa Tkautz)	2011	—	The Hits & More
"Gotta Let You Go"	2015	—	Non-album singles
"In the Evening" (Nick Skitz featuring Melissa Tkautz)	2016	—	Non-album singles
"The Key"	2017	—	Non-album singles
"Not Enough" (7th Heaven featuring Melissa Tkautz)	2025	—	Non-album singles
"Full of Lies" (Nick Jay featuring Melissa Tkautz)	2025	—	Non-album singles
"—" denotes a recording that did not chart or was not released in that territory.

== Awards and recognition ==
Year	Award-giving Body	Award	Result
1992	ARIA Award	Highest Selling Single ("Read My Lips")	Won
1992	ARIA Award	Best New Talent ("Read My Lips")	Nominated
1991	Logie Award	Best New Talent (E Street)	Nominated

== See also ==
- List of artists who reached number one on the Australian singles chart
