= Jenn Forbes =

- Birth name: Jennifer May Forbes
- Origin: Sydney, New South Wales, Australia
- Years active: 1990–present
- Labels: Mushroom

Jennifer May "Jenni" Forbes is an Australian-born singer-songwriter. She released the album I, No Y in 1995. She is best known for writing "I Want You" for Toni Pearen.

== Biography ==
Forbes' recording debut, "Love Letters", appears on the soundtrack of Russell Crowe's 1990 movie, The Crossing.

In March 1993, Forbes released her debut single "Dream On (Kathy's Song)". This was followed by "Baby Come Back" and "I'll Be There for You" and her album, I, No Y in October 1995.

== Discography ==
=== Albums ===
List of albums, with selected chart positions
| Title | Album details | Peak chart positions |
| Title | Album details | AUS |
|---|---|---|
| I, No Y | Released: October 1995; Label: Mushroom (D24493); Format: CD, CD | 169 |

=== Singles ===
List of singles, with selected chart positions
| Title | Year | Chart positions | Album |
| Title | Year | AUS | Album |
|---|---|---|---|
| "Dream On (Kathy's Song)" | 1993 | 104 | I, No Y |
| "I'll Be There for You" | 1995 | 169 | I, No Y |
| "Baby Come Back" | 1995 | 167 | I, No Y |
| "I'm Gonna Show You a Diva" (with Andrew Worboys) | 2004 | | Non-album single |

=== Other appearances ===
List of other non-single song appearances
| Title | Year | Album |
|---|---|---|
| "Love Letters" | 1990 | The Crossing |
