= The Glamorous Life =

1984 single by Sheila E

- Vinyl variant of standard artwork

Single by Sheila E.

from the album The Glamorous Life
- B-side: "The Glamorous Life" (Part II)
- Released: May 2, 1984
- Recorded: December 27, 1983 (instrumentation); March 29–30, 1984 (Sheila E.'s overdubs)
- Studio: Sunset Sound Recorders (Hollywood, California)
- Genre: Funk-pop
- Length: 9:04 (full album version); 6:35 (12 inch club edit); 3:41 (7-inch version)
- Label: Warner Bros.
- Songwriter: Prince
- Producers: Sheila E.; the Starr ★ Company

Sheila E. singles chronology
"The Glamorous Life" (1984)	"The Belle of St. Mark" (1984)

Music video
- "The Glamorous Life" on YouTube

"The Glamorous Life" is a song written by Prince, recorded by American percussionist Sheila E. and produced by both. The song has lyrics which reflect a cynicism for the decadence and materialism of the song's protagonist, referred to in the third person, who "wants to lead a glamorous life", although she is aware that "without love, it ain't much".

"The Glamorous Life" is the title track and closing song on Sheila E.'s debut solo album, and reached number seven on the US Billboard Hot 100 chart, as well as number one on the Billboard Dance/Disco Top 80 chart. The track earned two Grammy Award nominations and three MTV Award nominations. In 2019, the original Prince demo of the song was released on his posthumous album Originals.

== Track listings ==
7-inch vinyl

A. "The Glamorous Life" – 3:41
B. "The Glamorous Life Part II" – 3:12

12-inch vinyl

A. "The Glamorous Life" (club edit) – 6:33
B. "The Glamorous Life Part II" – 3:12

== Personnel ==
Personnel are sourced from Benoît Clerc and Duane Tudahl.

- Sheila E. – lead and backing vocals, cowbells, timbales, cymbal
- Prince – co-lead and backing vocals, Oberheim OB-8, Linn LM-1
- Larry Williams – alto saxophone
- David Coleman – cello
- Jill Jones – backing vocals

== Charts ==
=== Weekly charts ===
Weekly chart performance for "The Glamorous Life"
Chart (1984–1985)	Peak position
Australia (Kent Music Report)	11
Belgium (Ultratop 50 Flanders)	5
Canada Top Singles (RPM)	3
Netherlands (Dutch Top 40)	2
Netherlands (Single Top 100)	3
UK Singles (Official Charts)	96
US Billboard Hot 100	7
US Dance/Disco Top 80 (Billboard)	1
US Hot Black Singles (Billboard)	9

=== Year-end charts ===
Year-end chart performance for "The Glamorous Life"
Chart (1984)	Position
Australia (Kent Music Report)	80
Belgium (Ultratop)	61
Canada Top Singles (RPM)	35
Netherlands (Single Top 100)	48
US Billboard Hot 100	30

== Melissa Tkautz version ==
"The Glamorous Life"

Single by Melissa Tkautz

from the album Lost & Found
- Released: September 5, 2005
- Length: 3:20
- Label: Big
- Songwriter: Prince
- Producer: Paul Wiltshire

Melissa Tkautz singles chronology
"Is It...?" (1993)	"The Glamorous Life" (2005)	"All I Want" (2005)

"The Glamorous Life" was covered by Australian actress and singer Melissa Tkautz in September 2005. The single was seen as a comeback for Tkautz who had enjoyed considerable success in the early 1990s both as an actress and singer. Tkautz had previously scored an Australian number-one hit in 1991 with the song "Read My Lips", which spent two weeks at the top spot and won her an ARIA Award for Highest Selling Single in 1992. After a twelve-year hiatus from the music industry, Tkautz returned with her cover of Sheila E.'s 1984 hit "The Glamorous Life" and a new album Lost & Found. "The Glamorous Life" debuted and peaked at number 31 on the Australian Singles Chart on September 18, 2005, and spent two weeks in the top 50.

=== Track listing ===
Australian CD single

1. "The Glamorous Life" (radio edit) – 3:22
2. "The Glamorous Life" (AC radio edit) – 3:35
3. "The Glamorous Life" (Hotfuss radio edit) – 3:21
4. "The Glamorous Life" (Luke Leal vs. Peachy club mix) – 8:24
5. "The Glamorous Life" (JimmyZ vs. Bootyscratcherz 4Play club mix) – 6:28
6. "The Glamorous Life" (Hotfuss club mix) – 6:22

=== Charts ===
Weekly chart performance for "The Glamorous Life" by Melissa Tkautz
Chart (2005)	Peak position
Australia (ARIA)	31

== T-Funk version ==
"The Glamorous Life"

Single by T-Funk featuring Inaya Day
- Released: October 3, 2005
- Studio: XXLarge
- Length: 3:30
- Label: Ministry of Sound Australia
- Songwriter: Prince
- Producer: mrTimothy

T-Funk singles chronology
"I'm On My Way" (2005)	"The Glamorous Life" (2005)	"Be Together" (2006)

Inaya Day singles chronology
"Nasty Girl" (2005)	"The Glamorous Life" (2005)	"Stand by Me" (2006)

Four weeks after Tkautz released her rendition of the song, Australian dance music act T-Funk released their cover, which features vocals from American singer Inaya Day. Andrew De Silva of Australian quartet CDB plays bass on the song. This version reached number 31 on the Australian ARIA Singles Chart four weeks after Tkautz's rendition did the same. Outside Australia, this cover peaked at number five in Hungary and number six on the US Billboard Hot Dance Club Play chart.

=== Track listing ===
Australian CD single

1. "The Glamorous Life" (T-Funk radio edit)
2. "The Glamorous Life" (T-Funk 12-inch)
3. "The Glamorous Life" (original demo 12-inch)
4. "The Glamorous Life" (mrTimothy remix 12-inch)

=== Credits and personnel ===
Credits are adapted from the Australian CD single liner notes.

Studio

- Recorded, mixed, and mastered at XXLarge Studio

Personnel

- Prince – writing
- Inaya Day – vocals
- Andrew De Silva – bass
- T-Funk – production (as mrTimothy)
- Rudy Sandapa, Damian Smith – programming
- Chris Petty – artwork and logo designs
- One of a Kind – additional design

=== Charts ===
Weekly chart performance for "The Glamorous Life" by T-Funk
Chart (2005–2006)	Peak position
Australia (ARIA)	31
Hungary (Dance Top 40)	10
Hungary (Single Top 40)	5
US Dance Club Songs (Billboard)	6
