= Forrest Redlich =

Australian independent screenwriter and producer

- Occupations: Film and television producer; screenwriter; editor; script consultant
- Known for: A Country Practice (TV series) as Executive producer and writer E Street (TV series), as creator, writer, producer

Forrest Redlich is an Australian independent screenwriter/producer of films, he has also worked as an editor and consultant of scripts.

Redlich broke into the industry with his original script High Rollin. He had also written two scripts Body Count and Dede and the Gunman which were not made.

After working on A Country Practice as a writer and producer, Redlich formed a production company with business partner Bruce Best called Westside Productions which their best known product was the TV serial E Street, which they created and wrote, with Redlich serving also as Executive Producer. This had its own record company, Westside Records, which had a number of hit singles.

== Credits (selected) ==
- High Rolling (1977) (feature film) - writer
- Sweet and Sour (TV series) - writer. 2eps.
- A Country Practice (TV series) - writer, script editor, producer. 594 episodes. 1984-1988
- E Street (TV series) - creator, writer, executive producer. 404 episodes. 1989–1993.
- Blue Heelers (TV series) - writer, story consultant. 100 episodes.
- Wittekerke (Belgian TV series based on early episodes of E Street) - creator. 1067 episodes.
- Westerdeich (German TV series based on E Street) - creator. 39 episodes.
