= Helen Irving =

Australian constitutional lawyer and researcher (born 1954)

Helen Irving FASSA, FAAL, FRSN
- Born: 8 April 1954 (age 72)
- Occupations: Constitutional Lawyer and academic
- Spouse: Stephen Gaukroger (1950-2023) Married 1980 to his death 2023.

Helen Irving (born 8 April 1954) is Professor Emerita at Sydney Law School, University of Sydney, Australia. Irving's research is in constitutional law, employing an historical perspective of the political and social context of Australian constitutional law and citizenship. Research interests include: Australian and comparative constitutional law, gender and constitutionalism, constitutional history and theory, constitutional citizenship.

In 2022 Irving completed an ARC Discovery Grant project on constitutional citizenship and allegiance.

Irving retired in 2020 from the University of Sydney Law School after 19 years of service.

Irving resides in Sydney Australia. She was married to philosopher and British historian Stephen Gaukroger (dec.2023), they have two children.

She is a recipient of the Commonwealth of Australia Centenary medal for services to the Centenary of Federation celebrations in 2001 and Finalist for the NSW Premier's Centenary History Award.

== Appointments ==
Between 1997 and 2013, Irving served as a member of the Advisory Council of the National Archives of Australia.

Irving has held international visiting positions in Hong Kong (2004), London (2009), the Fernaund Braudel Senior Fellowship at the European University Institute (2015) and Harvard Chair of Australian Studies at Harvard Law School (2005-2006).

Expert witness for various Commonwealth Parliament committees.

Member on the Advisory Committee, Museum of Democracy, “Democracy DNA” exhibition.

== Education ==
Bachelor of Arts from the University of Melbourne (Hons I, with the Dwight Prize in Political Science); Bachelor of Law (First Class Honours) and PhD, University of Sydney. In the interim, Irving completed a Masters of Philosophy at University of Cambridge, England.

== Contributions outside academia ==
By invitation of United Nations Development Program (UNDP), Irving co-authored a report (alongside Professor Vivien Hart) on gender equality and constitution-making for Iraq in 2003. She contributed by invitation to UN Women workshops on women and constitutional design in New York (2015) and Santiago (2016), the latter as a joint UN Women and Chilean government initiative on Chilean constitutional reform. She has also advised international organisations on constitutional design and gender equality, including on the development of a practical guide to constitution-making for women in countries embarking on constitutional reform.

Irving has written over 50 opinion pieces for newspapers and journals on constitutional history and citizenship, in particular during the years leading to the centenary of federation, the republic debate, and the debate on the proposed adoption of a national Human Rights Act, and on citizenship.

== Awards ==
- 1995, Women and Politics essay prize, Australian Association of Political Science.
- 1996, Manning Clark essay prize, Evatt Foundation
- 1998, Honourable mention, Centre for Australian Cultural Studies Book Award, for To Constitute a Nation (CUP 1997)
- 2001, Finalist, NSW Premier's Centenary History Award, for Irving (ed), The Centenary Companion to Australian Federation (CUP 1999)
- 1995, Australian Political Science Association, Women and Politics essay prize
- 2003, Centenary Medal of Australia
- 2005–2006, Harvard Chair of Australian Studies
- 2012 University of Sydney, Law School Award for Excellence in Teaching
- 2015 Fernand Braudel Visiting Fellow, the European University Institute, Italy

== Honours ==
- 2008 Delegate, Prime Minister's 2020 Summit
- 2013 Elected Fellow of the Academy of Social Sciences in Australia
- 2014 Elected Fellow of the Australian Academy of Law
- 2015 Elected Fellow of the Royal Society of New South Wales

== Bibliography ==
Complete publications, see: https://sydney.edu.au/law/about/staff/HelenIrving/index.shtml

- Irving, H. (1997). To Constitute a Nation: A Cultural History of Australia's Constitution - 1997. United Kingdom: Cambridge University Press.
- Irving, H. (1999). To Constitute a Nation: A Cultural History of Australia's Constitution. Updated edn. United Kingdom: Cambridge University Press.
- Irving, H. (2004). Five Things To Know About The Australian Constitution. Australia: Cambridge University Press.
- Irving, H. (2008). Gender and the Constitution: Equity and Agency in Comparative Constitutional Design. New York: Cambridge University Press.
- Irving, Helen (2010). "Constitution Day 2010". Memento. 39. National Archives of Australia: 2–5.
- Ross, S., Irving, H., Klug, H. (2014). Comparative Constitutional Law: A Contextual Approach. United States: LexisNexis.
- Irving, H. (2016). Citizenship, Alienage, and the Modern Constitutional State: A Gendered History. Cambridge: Cambridge University Press.
- Irving, H. (2022) 'Allegiance, Citizenship and the Law: The Enigma of Belonging" United Kingdom, Edward Elgar Publishing.

== External sources ==
- Speech by Helen Irving- Launch of the Henry Parkes Foundation, NSW Parliament House, 4 June 1999
- Speech by Federal Arts Minister, Peter Mcgaruan - Launch Irving's The Centenary Companion to Australian Federation, 1 November 1999
- Helen Irving on Mary Wollstonecraft and the Enlightenment via YouTube
