= Skin to Skin =

1992 single by Melissa

Single by Melissa

from the album Fresh
- B-side: "Take It from Me"
- Released: 6 April 1992
- Length: 3:49
- Label: Phonogram; Powerhouse
- Songwriters: Roy Nicolson; Tony King II; Leon Berger
- Producers: Leon Berger; Doug Henderson; Alston Koch

Melissa singles chronology
"Sexy (Is the Word)" (1991)	"Skin to Skin" (1992)	"My House" (1992)

Skin to Skin is a song by Australian recording artist Melissa. The song was released on 6 April 1992 as the third single from Melissa's debut studio album, Fresh. It peaked at number 16 on the Australian Singles Chart, becoming her final top-20 hit in Australia.

== Music video ==
The music video for this song features Melissa in a various number of outfits, such as a long black dress and purple shirt, and also features Melissa lying on a satin-sheeted bed. Comparisons between the "Skin to Skin" film clip to that of Kylie Minogue's "What Do I Have to Do" are numerous. This clip also sees Melissa backed by dancers clad head to toe in black and white lycra.

== Track listing ==
Australian CD and cassette single

1. "Skin to Skin" – 3:49
2. "Take It from Me" – 4:04

== Charts ==
Chart (1992)	Peak position
Australia (ARIA)	16
