= All I Want (Melissa Tkautz song) =

Single by Melissa Tkautz

from the album Lost & Found
- Released: 20 November 2005 (Australia)
- Genre: Pop/Dance
- Length: 3:34
- Label: JRB Music
- Songwriter(s): Melissa Tkautz
- Producer(s): Paul Wiltshire

Melissa Tkautz singles chronology
"The Glamorous Life" (2005)	"All I Want" (2005)	"Easily Affected" (2006)

"All I Want" is a song and single by Australian singer and actress Melissa Tkautz. There was no promotional video for "All I Want", and the single was only a minor chart success in Australia, peaking at number 72 in the singles chart.

== Formats and track listings ==
=== Australian CD single 6-tracks ===
1. "All I Want" (PLW Radio Edit)
2. "All I Want" (007 Radio Edit)
3. "All I Want" (DJ Luke Leal vs 4Play Radio Edit)
4. "All I Want" (007 Club Mix)
5. "All I Want" (007 Club Mix)
6. "All I Want" (JimmyZ vs Diego V's 4Play Club Mix)

=== Australian CD single 7-tracks ===
1. "All I Want" (PLW Radio Edit) – 3:34
2. "All I Want" (007 Radio Edit Mix) – 3:20
3. "All I Want" (DJ Luke Leal vs Peachy Radio Edit) – 3:49
4. "All I Want" (JimmyZ vs Diego V's 4Play Radio Edit) – 4:27
5. "All I Want" (007 Club Mix) – 5:49
6. "All I Want" (DJ Luke Leal vs Peachy Remix) – 8:11
7. "All I Want" (JimmyZ vs Diego V's 4Play Club Mix) – 6:45

== Charts ==
Chart (2005)	Peak position
Australian ARIA Singles Chart	72
Australasian Chart	19
Australian Dance Chart	10
Australian Club Chart	28
