= Greg Craven (academic) =

Australian academic

Greg Craven AO
- Born: Melbourne, Victoria, Australia
- Education: University of Melbourne
- Relatives: Peter Craven (brother)
- Awards: Order of Australia (AO); Order of St. Gregory the Great (KGCSGG)
- Scientific career
- Fields: Australian constitutional law, Federalism, succession
- Workplaces: Monash University, University of Notre Dame Australia, Curtin University of Technology, Australian Catholic University

Gregory Joseph Craven is an Australian academic. He was vice-chancellor and president of the Australian Catholic University from February 2008 until January 2021.

== Early life and education ==
Craven was educated at St Kevin's College in the Melbourne suburb of Toorak. He graduated from the University of Melbourne with a BA (1980); an LL.B (1981); and an LL.M (1984).

The literary critic Peter Craven is his older brother.

== Career ==
Craven taught at Monash University from 1982 to 1984. He was appointed director of research for the Legal and Constitutional Committee of the Victorian Parliament, spending three years in the position between 1985 and 1987.

He was then appointed associate professor at the University of Melbourne. He then served as Crown Counsel to the Attorney-General for Victoria from 1992 until 1995, briefly returning to his previous post before being appointed professor of law at Notre Dame University in Fremantle, Western Australia, in 1996.

He then became deputy vice-chancellor (strategy and planning) at Curtin University of Technology in Perth. He also served as executive director of the John Curtin Institute of Public Policy.

Craven became vice-chancellor and president of the Australian Catholic University in February 2008. His initial term was set to finish in 2013, but was extended to March 2018. On 8 April 2020, the ACU chancellor, John Fahey, announced Craven's planned retirement, to become effective in January 2021. His successor was named as Zlatko Skrbis.

== Other activities ==
Craven has researched and written on constitutional law. He is a regular columnist for The Australian newspaper.

He was a leading advocate of republicanism in the leadup to the (eventually unsuccessful) 1999 referendum on the proposed change in Australia from being a constitutional monarchy to a republic.

Craven has served on a range of public bodies. He chaired the Teacher Education Ministerial Advisory Group and was deputy chair of the COAG Reform Council. He was a member of the Commonwealth Higher Education Standards Panel (HESP) and the lead vice-chancellor for Universities Australia on quality and regulation.

In February 2019, following the 2018 trial and conviction of Cardinal George Pell for child abuse, Craven provided one of 10 positive character references for the purposes of the sentencing hearing. Pell was eventually acquitted and all the convictions quashed by the High Court of Australia on 7 April 2020.

== Bibliography ==
- Secession: the ultimate states' right. Melbourne University Press. 1986. ISBN 978-0-522-84317-0.
- "A Bill of Rights for Victoria?: some issues", Victorian Parliament. Legal and Constitutional Committee, Government Printer, 1986, ISBN 978-0-7241-4193-7
- The Convention debates, 1891–1898: commentaries, indices and guide, Legal Books, 1987, ISBN 978-0-949553-17-1
- The High Court of Australia: a study in the abuse of power, Alfred Deakin Lecture Trust, 1997, ISBN 978-0-909888-27-5
- Craven, G., ed. (1992). Australian federation: towards the second century : a work to mark the centenary of the Australasian Federation Conference held at Parliament House, Melbourne, 6–14 February 1890. Melbourne University Press.
- Conversations with the Constitution : not just a piece of paper. Sydney: UNSW Press. 2004.
- "Australian federalism : an heroic defence". Memento. 39: 6–9. 2010.

== Degrees and honours ==
- Bachelor of Arts (BA), University of Melbourne (1980)
- Bachelor of Laws (LLB), University of Melbourne (1981)
- Master of Laws (LLM), University of Melbourne (1984),
- Knight Grand Cross of the Order of St Gregory the Great (GCSG) (2015),
- Officer of Order of Australia (AO) 2017
