= All Men Are Liars =

- Directed by: Gerard Lee
- Written by: Gerard Lee
- Produced by: John Maynard; Chris Brown; Douglas Cummins; Robert Connolly
- Starring: Toni Pearen; David Price; John Jarratt
- Cinematography: Steve Arnold
- Edited by: Suresh Ayyar
- Music by: Wayne Goodwin; Mark Moffatt
- Production company: Arenafilms
- Distributed by: Ronin Films
- Release date: 30 November 1995
- Running time: 91 minutes
- Country: Australia
- Language: English
- Box office: A$836,606 (Australia)

All Men Are Liars is a 1995 Australian comedy film written and directed by Gerard Lee and starring Toni Pearen and David Price.

== Plot ==
Barry decides to pawn the family piano that belongs to his wife Irene. This results in Irene leaving him and their sons Mick and Tom. Mick desperately wants his mother to return home and so he decides to save up some money to buy the piano back. The town's annual harvest festival is about to commence and an all-female band fronted by the beautiful Angela arrives to participate. Mick develops a wacky scheme in which he dresses up in his mother's clothes and becomes 'Michelle', in hopes of joining the girl band to make the money he needs. The scheme works, however Mick becomes increasingly attracted to Angela who has just broken up with her boyfriend after he cheated on her with the band's ex-guitarist. Mick/Michelle eventually earns enough money to buy the piano back, however Angela has since become close to 'Michelle' and has now developed unexpected feelings for her/him. Angela then begins questioning her sexuality and unfortunately for Mick, she has vowed to kill any man who lies to her again.

== Cast ==
- Toni Pearen as Angela
- David Price as Mick/Michelle
- John Jarratt as Barry
- Jamie Peterson as Tom
- Carmen Tanti as Irene
- Ken Billett as Alf

== Production ==
Gerard Lee first came up with the idea for the film in the early 1980s and wrote several drafts.

== Reception ==
All Men Are Liars was nominated for the 1995 Australian Film Institute Award for Best Film.

The film proved to be successful at the Australian box office grossing approximately $836,606 domestically.

In many of the reviews for the film, critics noted the similarities between this film and the 1959 comedy film Some Like It Hot starring Marilyn Monroe, which also had a storyline about two cross-dressing men who join an all-female band and fall in love with the beautiful lead singer.
