= Anne Fairbairn =

Australian poet and journalist (1928–2018)

Anne Mary Ross Fairbairn AM (also Body, née Reid; 1928 – 22 October 2018) was a widely published Australian poet, journalist and expert in Arab culture. Fairbairn has been known for her work in bringing together Australian and Arab cultures for over 30 years through poetry.

== Personal life ==
She is the only granddaughter of Australia's fourth Prime Minister, George Reid.

In 1965, she married Geoffrey Forrester Fairbairn, a Professor in the Department of History at the Australian National University. Geoffrey died in London of lung cancer on 11 September 1980.

She died at the age of 90 on 22 October 2018.

== Awards and honours ==
In 1995, she was awarded the Banjo Paterson Writing Award for Open Poetry. This was followed by the Order of Australia in 1998 for services to literature and international relations between Australia and the Middle East.

In September 2005, Fairbairn received the award, "Living for Others – Promoting Peace through Media, Arts and Culture" from the International and Inter-Religious Federation for World Peace presented in Sydney by Professor Marie Bashir AO, Governor of New South Wales.
