= Toni Pearen =

Australian actress and TV personality

- Born: Toni Michelle Pearen
- Occupations: Actress; singer; songwriter; TV presenter; media presenter
- Years active: 1988–present
- Known for: E Street
- Notable work: Australia's Funniest Home Video Show
- Spouse: Will Osmond (2007–present)
- Musical career
- Genre: Pop
- Instrument: vocals

Toni Michelle Pearen (born 5 June 1972) is an Australian entertainer, actress, singer, songwriter and television presenter. She initially became recognisable through her role on soap opera E Street from 1989 until 1992. She had a limited pop music career in the mid-1990s with the release of one album, Intimate (November 1994), which provided two ARIA certified gold singles, "In Your Room" (November 1992) and "I Want You" (April 1993). She was host of Australia's Funniest Home Video Show from 2003 to 2007, and competed on the eighth season of Dancing with the Stars (2008).

== Career ==
=== Film and television career ===
Pearen came to be known in 1989 when she landed the role of Toni Windsor on the Australian soap opera E Street. She played the role until 1992 when she left to pursue her music career. In 1994, she briefly returned to TV, this time playing Beth Armstrong on Home and Away.

Pearen also appeared in a number of films including All Men Are Liars, Colin Fitz Lives! and On the Dead Side, all released in 1995. From 1995 until 2002 Pearen lived and worked in the United States, guest starring in multiple television shows such as JAG.

Upon returning to Australia in 2002, Pearen landed the role as host of Nine's Australia's Funniest Home Video Show beginning February 2003. In an interview with ninemsn, she said the show was a perfect fit for her, and it "reminds us that strange things happen every day, and you need to laugh."

After Australia's Funniest Home Video Show Pearen took on a guest starring role with the soap Out of the Blue for five episodes, and in 2010 had a small part in the World War II miniseries The Pacific, produced by Steven Spielberg – the follow-up to Band of Brothers.

Pearen began appearing on the eighth season of the Seven Network's Dancing with the Stars.

In 2021, Pearen participated as a contestant in the seventh season of I'm A Celebrity...Get Me Out of Here! Australia.

=== Music career ===
After leaving E Street, Pearen became a success in the Australian Dance Pop scene in 1992 and 1993, scoring two consecutive top 10 ARIA Gold certified hits with "In Your Room" and "I Want You". A year later, between 1994 and 1995 two less successful singles were released, "Walkaway Lover" and "Joy". Pearen's 1994 album Intimate was well received by critics, but peaked at number 56 in Australia.

From 1995 to 2002, Pearen lived in Los Angeles, working as an actor, singer and songwriter. In 2002, she moved back to Australia, taking residence on Scotland Island, New South Wales. In early 2003 during an appearance on Who Wants to Be a Millionaire?, Pearen revealed she could be aiming to revive her music career in the near future. It was later revealed that part of the reason for her hiatus in the United States was to find the time to write new music. Although she has made musical performances at Carols by Candlelight in 2003 and ABBA Mania in 2006, very little of any plans to return to music did not happen until August 2008 when a new untitled demo track appeared on Pearen's Official MySpace page. Later in September 2008 another new untitled demo was added. On 21 October 2008 The Daily Telegraph reported on plans that Pearen is considering to start work on her long-awaited follow up album to 1994's Intimate, with achieving Top 5 on Dancing with the Stars as her inspiration.

In 2022, Pearen made her long-awaited return to the music industry and released a song called "1972". This was inspired by Pearen celebrating her 50th birthday in 2022 and how the world has evolved since her birth year of 1972. It and a subsequent single "Whatever Will Be" were collaborations with Pipi Le Oui and feature on the Two Tribes compilation Two Tribes 2021-2025.

=== Dancing with the Stars performances ===
In late 2008, Toni Pearen joined the cast of the eighth season of Dancing with the Stars. Pearen's partner is Henry Byalikov from the first season of So You Think You Can Dance Australia.

She was eliminated on 19 October 2008.

Week #	Dance/Song	Judges' score			Result
Week #	Dance/Song	Todd	Helen	Mark	Result
1	Cha-cha-cha / "Mercy"	9	9	9	Safe
2	Tango / "Toxic"	8	7	8	Safe
3	Samba / "Work"	7	8	8	Safe
4	Quickstep / "Let's Go Crazy"	9	9	10	Safe
5	Salsa / "American Boy"	8	8	8	Safe
6	Rumba / "No Air"	8	8	8	Safe
7	Jive / "Maniac"; Foxtrot / "Always Look on the Bright Side of Life"	9; 5	8; 7	8; 6	Eliminated

== Personal life ==
Pearen began her singing/acting studies at Lynda Keane Studios Sydney with Lynda Keane and Greg Anderson.

She dated her Home and Away co-star, Mat Stevenson in 1994.

In late 2006, Pearen was engaged to longtime boyfriend, Will Osmond, a bankrupted ex co-owner of a Darling Harbour restaurant. They have jointly acquired property, and once resided together on Scotland Island. Pearen married Osmond in the north western New South Wales town of Moree on 17 November 2007. Pearen's Los Angeles-based actor friend Kym Wilson was her bridesmaid.

Pearen gave birth to a son in 2009 and a daughter in 2012.

== Filmography ==
=== Main Television and film roles ===
Year	Title	Role	Notes
1988	A Country Practice	Patty Morrison	First acting role
1989–1992	E Street	Toni Windsor	First regular role
1994	Home and Away	Beth Armstrong	Recurring role; 19 episodes
1995	All Men Are Liars	Angela	Feature film, Leading role
1995	On the Dead Side		Feature film
1997	Colin Fitz Lives!	Pandemonium Fan	Feature film
2003–2007, 2011	Australia's Funniest Home Videos	Host	Longest serving host of the show to date Returned for the 21st Anniversary episode
2008	Out of the Blue	Justine	Appeared in five episodes
2011	Tough Nuts	Matilda 'Tilly' Devine	Foxtel

== Discography ==
=== Albums ===
Title	Details	Peak chart positions
Title	Details	AUS
Intimate	Released: November 1994; Label: Mushroom (TVD93409)	56

=== Singles ===
Title	Year	Peak chart positions	Certification	Album
Title	Year	AUS	Certification	Album
"In Your Room"	1992	10	ARIA: Gold	Intimate
"I Want You"	1993	10	ARIA: Gold	Intimate
"Walkaway Lover"	1994	35		Intimate
"Joy"	1995	71		Intimate
"1972" (with Pipi Le Oui)	2022			Two Tribes 2021-2025
"Whatever Will Be Will Be" (Pipi Le Oui)	2023			Two Tribes 2021-2025

== Awards and nominations ==
=== ARIA Music Awards ===
The ARIA Music Awards are a set of annual ceremonies presented by Australian Recording Industry Association (ARIA), which recognise excellence, innovation, and achievement across all genres of the music of Australia. They commenced in 1987.

Year	Nominee / work	Award	Result	Ref.
1994	"I Want You"	Best Pop Release	Nominated	
