= Read My Lips (Melissa song) =

1991 single by Melissa

Single by Melissa

from the album Fresh
- B-side: "Say Goodbye"
- Released: 20 May 1991
- Studio: Powerhouse (Sydney, Australia)
- Length: 3:43
- Label: Phonogram
- Songwriters: Tony King; Roy Nicolson
- Producer: Leon Berger

Melissa singles chronology
"Read My Lips" (1991)	"Sexy (Is the Word)" (1991)

Music video
- "Read My Lips" on YouTube

"Read My Lips" is a song written by Tony King and Roy Nicolson, produced by Leon Berger for Australian singer Melissa's first album, Fresh (1992). It was released as the album's first single in Australia on 20 May 1991, while Melissa was starring as Nikki Spencer on the Australian soap opera E Street. It became her first and only number-one hit when it topped the Australian ARIA Singles Chart in July 1991.

== Chart performance ==
"Read My Lips" was the only number-one hit in 1991 by a solo female Australian singer and was nominated for two ARIA Awards. The song debuted on the Australian ARIA Singles Chart on 3 June 1991 at number 41. After six weeks of being in the charts, the song had made its way to number one, knocking "The Grease Megamix" off the top spot. It stayed there for another week but then was dethroned by "(Everything I Do) I Do It for You" by Bryan Adams. "Read My Lips" became Melissa's highest-selling single of her career, spending 18 weeks in the top 50 and 21 weeks in the top 100. The single was certified platinum by Australian Recording Industry Association (ARIA), becoming the sixth-highest-selling single for 1991. "Read My Lips" won the ARIA Award for "Highest Selling Single" for 1992.

== Track listings ==
Australian 7-inch, CD, and cassette single

1. "Read My Lips" – 3:48
2. "Say Goodbye" – 4:59

Australian 12-inch single

A1. "Read My Lips"
B1. "Say Goodbye"
B2. "Read My Lips"

== Charts ==
=== Weekly charts ===
Chart (1991)	Peak position
Australia (ARIA)	1

=== Year-end charts ===
Chart (1991)	Position
Australia (ARIA)	6

== Sales and certifications ==
Region	Certification	Certified units/sales
Australia (ARIA)	Platinum	70,000^{^}
^{^} Shipments figures based on certification alone.
