= E Street (TV series) =

Australian television series (1989–1993)

- Genre: Soap opera crime drama
- Created by: Forrest Redlich
- Developed by: Forrest Redlich
- Written by: David Allen; John Banas; David Boutland; Tony Cavanaugh; Tony Cole; Michael Cove; C M Covington; Louise Crane; Mary Dagmar Davies; Wayne Doyle; Grant Fraser; Malcolm Frawley; Tom Galbraith; Tom Hegarty; Lisa Hoppe; Graeme Koetsveld; Nicholas Langton; Serge Lazareff; Rick Maier; Chris McCourt; Greg Millin; Margaret Morgan; Sean Nash; Peter Neale; Rhett O'Hara; Matthew O'Sullivan; David Phillips; Tim Pye; Forrest Redlich; Chris Roache; Leon Saunders; Andrew Saw; C V Schofield; Sheila Sibley; Steve J. Spears; Caroline Stanton; Hugh Stuckey; John Upton; Sally Webb; Debra Wilcock; Craig Wilkins; Linden Wilkinson; Carol Williams; Alexa Wyatt
- Directed by: Michael Ailwood; John Banas; Bruce Best; Grant Brown; Geoff Cawthorn; Philip East; Robin Hardy; Rod Hardy; Robert Meillon; Steve Mann; David Morgan; Sean Nash; Tony Osicka; Richard Riddiford; Viktors Ritelis; Graham Rouse; Alister Smart; Leigh Spence; Karl Zwicky
- Starring: (see list of credited cast below)
- Theme music composer: Ashley Irwin / Twilight Productions
- Composer: Neil Sutherland
- Country of origin: Australia
- Original language: English
- No. of seasons: 4.5
- No. of episodes: 404 x 60-minute episodes

Production
- Executive producer: Forrest Redlich
- Producers: Bruce Best; Denis Phelan; Andrew Saw; Forrest Redlich
- Production locations: Rozelle, Balmain, Australia
- Running time: 60 minutes/30 minutes
- Production company: Westside Television Productions

Original release
- Network: Network Ten
- Release: 24 January 1989 – 20 May 1993

Related
- Richmond Hill; A Country Practice (Network Ten series, 1994); Wittekerke (Belgium); Westerdeich (Germany)

E Street is an Australian television soap opera created by Forrest Redlich and produced by his production company, Westside Television Productions, for Network Ten. It was broadcast twice weekly, from Wednesday, 24 January 1989 to Thursday, 20 May 1993. The series won several Logie Awards.

E Street is short for Eden Street, which is based in a tough fictional inner-city district called Westside. The action of the soap opera revolves around the local community.

The soap opera Richmond Hill, which was produced by the Grundy Organisation, was cancelled by Network Ten to make way for E Street. E Street initially rated poorly in Australia, but early audience research indicated that it had attracted both a significant proportion of the 14–35 audience demographic and a large male viewership. After a radical overhaul of the show, revised storylines and updated characters targeting the niche demographics, the ratings steadily climbed.

E Street ran for 404 episodes, each one hour long. Like many Australian soap operas before it, E Street was broadcast as two one-hour episodes each week and until the premiere of HeadLand in November 2005, it had been the last Australian soap opera to screen its episodes in this format. In the U.K., E Street aired as edited half-hour episodes, stripped 5 days a week.

== About E Street ==
=== Beginnings ===
E Street was created and produced by Forrest Redlich. The structure of the original cast and the format of the first episodes were modelled on A Country Practice, a highly successful serial on Seven Network that both Redlich and producer Bruce Best had worked on for several years until 1988. The earliest episodes of E Street could be seen as an urban version of that soap, tackling human interest, issue-led stories over two weekly hour-long episodes, with continuing storylines carried by the small regular ensemble cast. Further similarities included setting much of the action around the local police station, a pub, and a doctor's surgery with the regular cast established as working at one of these locations. While in rural A Country Practice, a veterinary practice was featured regularly, in suburban E Street, this was replaced with a legal aid centre.

A more obvious comparison with A Country Practice was the addition of actress Penny Cook as E Street's leading, anchor character, Doctor Elly Fielding. Cook had previously had a popular run as veterinarian Vicky Dean in A Country Practice from the series inception in 1981 through to 1985. After a break of over two years, it was announced in late 1988 that Cook would be returning to television in E Street. Elly is a single mother to young tomboy Claire (Brooke Mikey Anderson), and they lived in the flat above Elly's surgery. Also, Claire's father and Elly's ex-husband, Dr David Fielding (Noel Hodda), a celebrity TV doctor, would occasionally appear in early episodes, usually to stir up trouble for Elly.

Another stand-out member of the original cast was Tony Martin as the hip and trendy Reverend Bob Brown. His blossoming relationship with Dr Elly spanned much of the entire run of the series. Other regulars from the beginning included the widowed publican Ernie Patchett (Vic Rooney), and his teenage son, Chris (Paul Kelman), who ran Patchett's Pacific pub, a central location seen in virtually every episode of the series. Chris was best friends with the pub's feisty barmaid, Lisa Bennett, played by Alyssa-Jane Cook, who became one of the soap's most popular stars. Soap veterans Leslie Dayman as police sergeant George Sullivan, and Cecily Polson as district nurse Martha O'Dare, enhanced the community feel of Westside.

The two remaining original characters – Rhonda Berry (Melanie Salomon), arrived in the first episode to join her husband, police constable Paul Berry (Warren Jones), who was already settled in Westside, and Sarah McKillop, (Katrina Sedgwick), arrived to take over the legal aid centre in the second episode – were both newcomers, and outsiders, to Eden Street when it all began. Viewers would be introduced to life on E Street loosely through the eyes of Sarah and Rhonda, with brash and bolshi Sarah disrupting life on the street with her progressive ideas on legal matters, while shy and slightly ditzy Rhonda, who had moved from Ballina, New South Wales, to Westside, struggled to adjust to her new life in the city with Paul. Sarah and Rhonda became unlikely good friends, bonded by their experiences in getting to know the initially hostile and tight-knit community. It would be through Sarah's various legal cases at the legal aid centre working with Reverend Bob, and Rhonda's new job as Elly's Receptionist at the doctor's surgery working with Martha – as well as Paul's work at the police station with George – that many of the series' original moralistic storylines emerged.

There was a significant amount of location work, and the (then) gritty areas of Rozelle and Balmain in Sydney, were used for all of the establishing shots of Westside and the backdrop for outside filming, a key location being The Pacific Hotel which doubled as Patchett's Pacific for the entire run of the series.

The first episodes of E Street aired in January 1989. After the much-publicised launch and following generally positive critical reviews, E Street did not perform well in Australian ratings. The opening episodes were seen as left-wing and relentlessly uncompromising in their approach to difficult and taboo subjects; for example, the second episode of E Street included a story arc about a young woman with severe learning difficulties who becomes pregnant after implied sexual abuse by a gang of young men. The subjects of rape, coercion and the legalities of forced abortion are all explored, and then abruptly conclude with the woman attempting to commit suicide and losing her unborn baby. A couple of weeks later, a four-episode story arc commenced which followed a ten-year-old boy who finds his mother dead from an overdose of valium in their crumbling bedsit. He goes to live with a foster family, but the boy accuses his foster father of sexual abuse. Homelessness, child abuse, domestic abuse, suicide, incest, disability, alcoholism, drug addiction, armed robbery, and illegal immigration are all covered explicitly in early episodes, but these often grim and socially conscious storylines were interspersed with lighter scenes, such as Rhonda and Sarah's cocktail party, Elly and Bob's slowly developing romance, and Rhonda unknowingly purchasing bedroom furniture from a porn baron. This gave the series a rather uneasy balance of crime and heavy drama mixed with lightweight soap opera and slapstick comedy.

After three months following the original format of gritty, hard-hitting storylines, extremely poor ratings proved that this approach was not working. The series was churning through storylines at such a fast pace that it was hard for viewers to keep up. Characters were introduced through the most tenuous of links with the regulars, but then disappeared at the end of their storyline, often with open-ended or unsatisfactory conclusions. The reliance on guest characters created a lack of continuity, very few cliffhangers, and little for viewers to come back for. The peripheral regular cast were given very little to do except support the guest characters who came in, played out, and then concluded their story arc, which made the regular characters seem two-dimensional. The serialized soap-drama hybrid which made A Country Practice so successful was underpinned by the strong support cast involved in their own ongoing dramas and this was evidently missing in the very early episodes of E Street. Redlich and series producer Denis Phelan recognised these shortcomings early on and immediately began to make radical changes to every aspect of the fledgling series. Redlich commented at the time:

"We had no children watching because it was too hard-hitting and no grannies because it was too hip. We had men and women under 40, and a particularly large male viewership, 14–35 which was an untapped group. I began writing the show for a male-skewing audience."

=== New Direction ===
After six months, starting at episode 39, E Street underwent its first major on-screen revamp. Initially, the preachy social commentary storylines were softened and gradually replaced by an increase in comedy and upbeat plots. Episode titles were dropped, and the two-episode, guest storyline of the week strand was replaced with a conventional serialised soap-opera format with the storylines now predominantly focused on the contract cast. Although still covering a range of hard-hitting issues, such as Lisa's traumatic rape ordeal, there began a colourful and interesting influx of new characters who were introduced to expand the small existing cast. Furthermore, the costumes became distinctive and fashionable and the music soundtrack was completely overhauled to include current hits and showcase new musical talent. All of these changes were part of the attempt to brighten up both the look and sound of E Street and move it entirely away from the gloomy atmosphere of its earliest episodes. Now with a targeted demographic, Redlich admitted E Street was revamped to intentionally target Generation X, which he described as the "Coca Cola Generation":

"We made a conscious decision to go for the younger audience, to go for that Coca Cola audience, which were a lot more savvy and a lot more hip than a lot of people gave them credit for"

There remained a dark undercurrent to the series, however, and while the writers ramped up the colour and comedy factor, they also set about revamping the cast, and E Street became notorious for regularly killing off established characters in unique and creative ways: the violent demise of two original characters – Rhonda Berry was shot dead in an armed siege and Sarah McKillop was raped and suffocated to death – reinforced the original intention by the producers to shock viewers and push boundaries.

By mid 1989, E Street had adopted an entirely new look. There was a redesigned title sequence accompanied by a punchier, remixed theme tune – plus, the expanded cast of trendy, likeable and younger characters brought the desired balance of soap, comedy and drama to the new-look E Street. The series was now on its way to positioning itself as the hip and street-wise soap opera, but edgier and more trendy than the safe and established Neighbours and Home and Away.

=== New characters ===
From mid-to-late 1989 and into early 1990, many new cast members were added to the established original line up, and these characters included a new solicitor for the legal centre, Jennifer St. James (Virginia Hey); Elly's recurring rogue ex-husband, David Fielding (Noel Hodda), was promoted to series regular during his short-lived romance with Mikki Fallon (Peta Toppano); dashing airline pilot, Daniel Windsor (Chris Orchard), moved his family of four young children to E Street when he began a whirlwind romance with Elly. Daniel's eldest daughter, Toni (Toni Pearen), became particularly popular, and after Daniel eventually left the series with the rest of his family after six months, Toni stayed in E Street, and moved in with Elly for several years.

Toni Windsor joined the other young new characters, including Stanley "Wheels" Kovac (Marcus Graham), who began an affair with Lisa Bennett which included a bathtub seduction scene which caused some controversy; next, George Sullivan's estranged daughter, Alice (Marianne Howard), came into the series by surviving a crash in a light aircraft piloted by Daniel Windsor; And then, Reverend Bob Brown's long-lost illegitimate son, Harley Kendrick (Malcolm Kennard), showed up in Westside, revealing secrets about the clergyman. These new characters all helped E Street become more popular.

Towards the end of the 1989 season, the Patchett family was significantly expanded. Following a rather short engagement to Lisa Bennett, Chris met depressed and pregnant socialite, Megan Bromley (Lisbeth Kennelly), and, feeling sorry for her, he married her on the rebound. The character of Megan was used to demonstrate the devastating effects of bipolar disorder. She was shown to have long periods of depression as well as mania, and this long-running storyline is another example of E Street exploring challenging issues. As Chris dealt with having to get Megan sectioned following a major manic episode, Ernie, meanwhile, had a boost in the romance stakes: he returned from a short holiday head-over-heels in love with American lounge singer, Abbey Rossiter (Chelsea Brown). Not long after this, soap veteran, Bunney Brooke, arrived as Ernie's gruff aunt, Violet "Auntie Vi" Patchett, and she moved into The Pacific and helped him run the pub.

The viewing figures for E Street had, by now, significantly improved: the revamp, new characters, and the serialised format had been a success and it was heading into the 1990s on its way to becoming a huge hit for Network Ten, which itself had been through a turbulent time, having been saved from closure in the previous few months.

=== Success ===
Not long after the start of the second season in January 1990, solicitor Jennifer St. James departed E Street under a cloud, and following this, the legal aid centre was phased out of the series for a while. Also leaving Westside was disgraced Daniel Windsor and his children (except Toni). Youngest son, Tom (Andrew Ferguson), was diagnosed with a rare form of cancer and the family departed for specialist treatment for him in Switzerland. A new character, stylish current affairs Journalist, Kim Talbot (Rebecca Saunders), moved into Westside and started a romance with unlucky widower, Paul Berry. Also giving Lisa a new lease of life following Wheels' (temporary) departure, she began working for Kim at Westside's revived local newspaper, The Advocate.

More new characters came into the show and George and Paul were joined at the police station by a young new recruit, police constable Max Simmonds, played by Bruce Samazan, who became one of E Street's biggest stars. Max's arrival had been shortly preceded by the appearance of its newest bad-boy character, the ex-prison inmate, Sonny Bennett (Richard Huggett), the brother of popular character Lisa Bennett. Addicted to speed and completely unpredictable, Sonny was also a hit with viewers and he'd been slowly built up in the scripts with references to him being in prison included in dialogue very early in the series. Writer Alexa Wyatt admitted in an interview for the E Street tribute site that Sonny's eventual introduction was intended to shake up the series again and to remove several established characters that writers felt had run their course. Sonny's dark and dramatic time on E Street climaxed with three members of the Patchett family, Chris, Megan, and Abbey, all perishing in perhaps the most memorable moment of the entire series when they were all killed off in a highly shocking car bomb explosion. Redlich commented at the time:

"It's impressive... I've been involved in more than 800 hours of television and this is the most expensive couple of hours I've ever put together".

These were harrowing scenes, topped off by the accidental shooting of Elly (Penny Cook) in a booby trap meant for Reverend Bob, and then the final act of suicide by Sonny himself. Redlich talked to TV Week about the writing out of the three characters, and went on to thank loyal viewers for the success E Street had now become:

"We have a lot to thank for the commitment and loyalty of the fans. For them, it seems one of the dramatic highlights was the bathtub scene with Wheels (Marcus Graham) and Lisa (Alyssa-Jane Cook). We still get letters about it. But the great stories have been the romance between Elly Fielding (Penny Cook) and Reverend Bob Brown (Tony Martin), then when Sonny Bennett (Richard Huggett) got out of gaol and blew up half the town. It was the saddest thing I have had to do. I spent a lot of time thinking it through. But it's been satisfying for me to know that E Street has given a start to a whole bunch of untried actors, such as Marcus, Richard, Alyssa-Jane and Paul. They have all taken off. It's funny to remember them as shy young people no-one had heard of and now see them as major players in television drama."

With Elly seriously injured and facing a long recovery, the residents of Westside slowly come to terms with the tragic loss of so many friends when the repercussions of Sonny's actions become clear.

To brighten up a sombre time, several new young faces were introduced to give E Street even more colour and credibility, and they included the series' next breakout star: Melissa Tkautz who came in as Nikki Spencer along with her brother, Zach (Daniel Knight). They arrived to stay with their Aunt Martha and George, and, after the cancellation of Family and Friends – a doomed rival soap opera on Nine Network – its most popular young actor, Adrian Lee, joined E Street as Craig "C.J" Jones. It was around this point that pop music videos became a regular feature in E Street, often being used to accompany dream sequences or to illustrate character's thoughts and daydreams. Storylines were now becoming more unpredictable and the ratings continued to rise: E Street was now nearing the top of Australian TV ratings.

The next big arrival was the powerful business woman Sheridan Sturgess who came to Westside to take over The Advocate, and eventually, the local TV station WTV8. This key role was played by Kate Raison, who, like Cook, was another actress who had become hugely popular after a successful run in A Country Practice as Cathy Hayden. Redlich created the role of Cathy and he worked extensively with Raison on A Country Practice, admitting his admiration for the actress on the Mr Bad's Revenge Part 2 DVD audio commentary. Glamorous and upfront, Sheridan became the series new leading lady. Her brother, Michael Sturgess (Graham Harvey), who'd already appeared as a guest character, also came back to E Street as a regular, and he married original favourite Lisa Bennett (Alyssa-Jane Cook). They all unwittingly become central to the next big storyline for the 1991 season: the arrival of the serial killer, Steven Richardson, better known as "Mr Bad" (Vince Martin). Redlich revealed in a TV Week interview that his production company were involved in the making of a documentary about serial killers, which is where the idea for the storyline came from. He stated:

"So what we wanted to do, basically, was explore it. Besides, it's a good yarn and it's topical – and where A Country Practice and G.P. do things on alcoholism, venereal disease and such social subjects, we chose the serial killer. Unfortunately they do exist."

=== "Mr Bad" ===
During the early part of the 1991 season, there was an exodus of several high-profile original characters; First to go was police constable Paul Berry (Warren Jones) who was sectioned after having a nervous breakdown live on Sheridan's TV show, The 5.30 Report. Two episodes later, Ernie Patchett (Vic Rooney) disappeared and left the confused locals in charge of the pub – and then, perhaps most jarring, was the departure of the entire Fielding family when Elly (Penny Cook), David (Noel Hodda) and Claire all departed E Street for a new life in Bangladesh. Also bowing out was Bunney Brooke as Auntie Vi Patchett, but her room at Patchett's Pacific was soon taken by yet another Patchett relative when Vi sent her English cousin, Mary (Joan Sydney), to take care of things while Ernie was still away. Also arriving to take over the surgery was Virginia Travis (Julieanne Newbould), an old friend of Elly's from Melbourne, who also moved into Elly's flat.

The loss of the well-established characters signalled another noticeable change in direction for E Street. The producers were busy developing a massive new storyline to keep viewers watching and they came up with a story to top everything that had happened before; this was E Streets most iconic story arc, the notorious 'Mr Bad' – a sadistic serial killer disguised as the community karate instructor. As the aforementioned original characters left, the twists and turns of Stephen and his evil alter-ego covered the losses, and the mid and latter part of the 1991 season was completely dominated by this convoluted plot. Redlich explained on a DVD release of these episodes in 2007 how the storyline was developed, and how those actors wishing to leave during this era of E Street became a victim of 'Mr Bad' and were duly killed off:

"[the way Vince Martin] became a serial killer was more by default than anything I think; I'd hired Vince... ...I had hired him just to do a one-murder job, if you like, but it just worked so well we kept it going and going and going... but Vince just really loved playing the role... ...because it was so anti-pretty boy – it was such an 'anti-pretty boy' role – he loved it, and to me the fact that Mr Bad was such a pretty boy really worked for it – it was unexpected... and the fact we had several cast members wanting to leave, not being pushed out... ...but we could roll all those stories together. What made us really unpredictable is that you didn't know who was going to die... ...we actually knocked off some of our regular cast that wanted to leave."

This storyline was a huge success for E Street and it finally sealed the popularity of the series when it peaked at No. 1 in the Australian ratings for the first time.

It all started when Sheridan innocently bumped into Stephen on Eden Street and this chance encounter suddenly triggered memories in Sheridan's subconscious mind and she started to have strange flashbacks. A vivid and unsettling technicolour dream sequence showed Sheridan's dream to viewers about the murder of a little girl called Becky Campbell at a birthday party, seemingly by a sinister-looking young man with his face painted half black and half silver. That person was revealed to viewers to be Steven Richardson, Claire Fielding's karate teacher, who'd been slowly introduced to viewers over the previous few weeks, and was now an average, middle-aged man. Sheridan's nightmares about Stephen became more frightening and intense, so she tried to warn her friends to stay away from him. They all assumed she was just being neurotic and that she should go and seek psychiatric help, but they were wrong to ignore her.

Stephen Richardson's reign of terror over Westside was fuelled by Sheridan's overwhelming fear of him, and despite her best efforts, she couldn't prevent the first shocking twist in the storyline which came with the murder of Dr Virginia Travis (Julieanne Newbould), the new GP at the surgery, with whom Stephen was initially romantically involved. When she broke things off, Stephen broke her neck. Virginia's demise was a dark and surprising development for viewers, and in the days before spoilers, it was an unexpected twist which was described as a brutal end to a popular but relatively short-lived character (portrayer Julieanne Newbould left to have a baby). Virginia's death was not known to the characters of E Street because she'd already said her goodbyes to everyone as she was returning to see her off-screen son in Melbourne. It wasn't long, however, before Sheridan's brother, Michael (Graham Harvey), became suspicious of Stephen's influence over his sister, but, as he got closer to the truth, Mr Bad claimed his next victim: Michael was brutally attacked with a shovel and buried next to Virginia.

The controversial plot was now at its height, and while more and more viewers were switching on, TV critics and Network Ten bosses were questioning how appropriate a serial killer storyline was in a prime time soap opera. Nevertheless, another bombshell was dropped on viewers when Michael Sturgess suddenly rose out of his shallow grave (next to Virginia's rotting corpse), and then tried to make it back to Westside to reveal the truth about Stephen Richardson and Mr Bad. Suffering from concussion, badly injured Michael finally reached the main road, but, just as he was about to reach safety, he stumbled into the road and into the path of an oncoming truck and was killed instantly.

With Michael now definitely dead, Virginia officially 'missing', and Sheridan on the verge of a complete mental breakdown, her friends on Eden Street rallied to help her. It wasn't long before Michael's dead body was found at the side of the road. Devastated, Lisa made it her mission to find out why Michael was way out in the country, and how he came to be hit by the truck that eventually killed him. Soon, Lisa stumbled on Michael's shallow grave in the forest, but then, shockingly, uncovered Virginia's grave next to it. Ratings soared and were now at their peak, and Stephen Richardson was finally arrested. But, after a dramatic stand-off with crooked country sergeant, Roy Harrison (John Clayton), at Westside police station, a plan to shoot Stephen dead went wrong and Mr Bad escaped again and went undercover for a while.

Life in Westside seemingly returned to normal, giving Sheridan time to get closer to Wheels, and they started a passionate relationship by memorably consummating their love for each other in a controversially steamy shower scene, which echoed Wheels' bubbly bathtub scenes with Lisa earlier in the series. But this was all the calm before the storm, and soon, Stephen Richardson was back in Westside. With the mysterious anonymous Radio DJ, "Doctor Rock", mercilessly goading the insane serial killer live on-air, Mr Bad came back to Westside to wreak his revenge, more bitter and vengeful than ever before.

Hitching his way back to Sydney, with his hair dyed dark brown and a moustache, Stephen murdered a truck driver, Bill McDonald, and adopted his identity. He answered an advert about a room for rent at James Newman's luxury beach house. James (Scott McRae) had earlier been introduced as police constable Max Simmonds's cousin, and when Stephen moved into his beach house, Mr Bad re-emerged, and the reign of terror started all over again. As Jamie's new lodger, 'Bill' and Jamie decided to celebrate becoming housemates by inviting two attractive young women to join them for drinks at the beach house – but it ended in tragedy with the grisly death of one of the women at the hands of Mr Bad. He returned to Eden Street to attempt to take revenge on Lisa, by freezing her to death in an industrial-sized freezer. He then went after Toni and kept her chained up in a derelict shed in the middle of the forest, and continually tormented Sheridan with terrifying psychic visions and more twisted mind games.

A tense and nail-biting armed showdown between Mr Bad and the Westside police kept the viewers hooked, with Sheridan held hostage and Stephen becoming more and more unhinged. Finally, the explosive plot climaxed and Sheridan blew 'Mr Bad's face off with a shotgun when he was about to be taken into custody, leaving viewers with the ultimate cliffhanger as to whether she'd killed him or not. Australian ratings soared to two and a half to three million viewers.

E Street had undoubtedly moved on from its well-meaning inception. Redlich defended the storyline, branding it "pure Freudian fantasy". It ran for almost a year proving that viewers had accepted the radical changes in tone and content and perhaps emphasising this change was the problematic recast of the original leading character, Dr Elly Fielding. Penny Cook left the series in March 1991 after announcing her decision to leave at the end of 1990 – not wanting to lose the pivotal character for good, writers brought Elly back and she returned from her six months in Bangladesh now being played by Diane Craig. The recast was considered a success and Craig continued in the part until the end of the series.

Elly rejoined her daughter Claire who'd returned to E Street as well by hitching a ride on the back of Wheels' Harley Davidson and this also marked the return of hugely popular Marcus Graham to the series after more than a year off-screen pursuing other roles. This time, he stayed for almost a year. Another returnee was Ernie Patchett who came back to Westside after his cousin, Mary, was mugged. Traumatised by the assault, Mary decided to return to England and Ernie proudly took back control of his pub. By the end of the 1991 season, and for most of 1992, E Street was the most popular series in Australia.

=== Peak of Popularity ===
E Street was now a recognised hit and Redlich was determined to keep his creation at the top of the ratings. It had, by now, surpassed Neighbours, Home and Away, and evergreen A Country Practice, in the Australian ratings and soared in popularity, retaining over two million viewers throughout the year. At the 1992 Australian Logies, E Street won the coveted "Most Popular Serial" category, finally sealing the peak of success in its home territory.

The popularity of E Street peaked in 1992 with the eventual conclusion of the long-running Mr Bad storyline. It was this plot that had kept the show at the top of the Australian ratings from mid 1991, and even after the departure of Vince Martin, who originally played the sadistic serial killer, and Kate Raison as his number one victim Sheridan Sturgess, the Mr Bad plot continued with a new actor playing the part. So following Sheridan blowing Stephen's face off, after a break of a few weeks, Mr Bad emerged again, but this time with a new actor lay silently in a hospital bed, his face wrapped entirely in bandages and a leather mask, with just one eyeball visible. Stephen started telepathically communicating with his nurse, Amy Preston (Rebecca Rigg), in a new story arc for the serial killer, reminiscent of the cult Australian 1978 film Patrick. Not only was Amy introduced as Stephen's devoted nurse, she was also the girlfriend of the latest new recruit at the police station, police constable Sam Farrell, the first television role for Simon Baker. After a few more weeks of twisted Mr Bad madness, Stephen and his evil alter ego were finally killed off, and it was revealed to viewers in one final technicolour dream sequence that Stephen had not, in fact, killed Becky Campbell, but the trauma of finding Becky's dead body is how Stephen's murderous rampage as Mr Bad was triggered. This time, Stephen Richardson remained dead, Amy was sent off to a psychiatric ward, leaving Sam heartbroken, and it was at this point the writers struggled to keep up the momentum, and with pressure from Network Ten to go for an older audience, E Street started to flounder.

Mid 1992, there were several high-profile cast departures who all left E Street at around the same time as many popular storylines were being wrapped up. A big loss to the series was Marcus Graham who completed three separate stints in the show as Stanley "Wheels" Kovac. Early in the series, he used a wheelchair, hence his nickname, although he was fully upright when he left E Street for good in episode 302, taking with him the popular character, Sheridan Sturgess, which also marked the end of Kate Raison's run in the series.

Also leaving was Melissa Tkautz: she abruptly departed to concentrate on her pop music career. Next, original favourite, Lisa Bennett (Alyssa-Jane Cook), and long-running Alice Sullivan (Marianne Howard), left. Soon after, Claire Fielding (Brooke Mikey Anderson) was written out after new producer, Andrew Saw, admitted they had run out of ideas for the character that did not involve blowing her up. Lastly, Toni (Toni Pearen) and C.J (Adrian Lee) left together in the 1992 season finale to start a new life together elsewhere.

With so much cast uncertainty, the solution was a raft of fresh new faces to revamp the series once again: Max's city lawyer cousin, Jamie Newman (Scott McRae), joined the cast during the Mr Bad revenge plot, and soon after, Josephine Mitchell first appeared as fashion designer Penny O'Brien, with her young daughter, Charlie (Prue Maguire). A former guest character, JoJo Adams (Kelly Abbey), returned to the series as a regular. A new and much vaunted bad boy came next and he was revealed to be Reverend Bob Brown's long-lost gangster brother, Jack (Andrew Williams). Melissa Bell, who had previously played a minor role as Janine in 1989, re-joined the cast as hippy Bonnie Tate, and soap veteran Joanna Lockwood was cast as Ernie Patchett's new love interest, Sally McKinnon. These new characters were met with limited success, however; Penny was described as a clone of the departed character Alice Sullivan, and Jack Brown's clichéd gangster storylines were considered the low point of E Street's final few months- especially when Elly's former sister-in-law, Laura Fielding (Antoinette Byron), turned out to be a hit woman on a secret mission to kill Jack. Shortly after this, the much derided storyline of an elaborate practical joke that involved Max turning into a werewolf became the final turning point and tabloids totally mauled the writers for their outlandish audacity and claimed the series was now past its peak and showing no signs of improving. Actor Bruce Samazan, commented at the time about the werewolf storyline:

"When the concept was first proposed, I thought, 'Hang on, what's going on here?' ... But I found out the storyline was in the spirit of fun, so that was okay".

=== The End ===
The series entered its final few months with an uncertain future, and following the poorly received werewolf storyline, there was further unrest behind the scenes. Scott McRae, who played Jamie Newman for over a year, was publicly sacked after he criticised the werewolf storyline to Redlich and the press. Another blow quickly followed when viewer favourite and a pivotal character from the very start, Reverend Bob Brown, was dramatically killed off after Tony Martin quit the show due to a row over money. But despite winning "Most Popular Serial" in the 1992 Logie Awards, plus actors Bruce Samazan and Simon Baker (then known as Simon Denny) both winning their respective acting categories in 1992 and 1993, E Street was cancelled by Network Ten in March 1993.

In an interview for the E Street tribute site, actor Leslie Dayman, who played George Sullivan for the show's entire run, revealed that the cast had just returned to filming, signed new contracts, and production was expected to end in May 1993. However, further negotiations apparently broke down, and within two weeks, E Street was over. Redlich explained on the 2007 DVD release, Mr Bad's Revenge Part 2, that the cancellation was more due to creative differences and the direction the network wanted to take the show, than falling viewing figures. Redlich revealed Network Ten wanted to relocate the studio production of E Street from Sydney to Melbourne, which would have caused many on-screen continuity issues, as well as creating unsustainable logistical problems for the entire cast and crew. Furthermore, Ten wanted to reformat E Street into five half-hour episodes, stripped Monday to Friday, the same as how the series was airing in Britain. With no extra money for relocation set-up costs, or for what amounted to an extra half-hour of E Street material per week, Redlich decided immediately to call time on the residents of Westside.

Storylines were hastily wrapped up and in the final episodes (403 and 404), the remaining characters were placed in life-threatening and cliffhanger situations: Jo-Jo (Kelley Abbey) battled the attentions of a sleazy loan shark; Ernie (Vic Rooney) was electrocuted in the cellar of Patchett's Pacific knocking him out, sparking a huge fire which then trapped Elly (Diane Craig), Laura (Antoinette Byron) and Sally (Joanna Lockwood) as they tried to rescue him; as the burning pub is evacuated, Jack (Andrew Williams) and Sam (Simon Baker) tried in vain to rescue everyone trapped in the cellar; meanwhile, Max (Bruce Samazan), Nikki (Melissa Tkautz), Alice (Marianne Howard) and Bonnie (Melissa Bell) were all lost in the outback when recently hospitalized Bonnie suddenly had a relapse and slipped back into a coma.

When the final episode began, time had moved on seven weeks and gradually it was revealed that all the characters were alive having survived the previous episodes' cliffhangers. The remaining cast, including Elly, Laura, Jack, JoJo, Ernie, Sally, Nikki, Max, George, Martha and Alice gathered around comatose Bonnie's hospital bedside and each read a line from a poem Max had found in recently deceased Reverend Bob's prayer book. As the last line was read out by Max, Bonnie finally opened her eyes, looked around, and simply said; "Max!" as everyone smiled and laughed around them. A final 10-minute montage of E Street's greatest moments was then played out to the closing credits, "It's All Over Now" performed by Andrew Williams (who played Jack Brown) with Elly (Diane Craig) tearfully laying a single red rose on Reverend Bob's grave as E Street's final scene, thus suitably signifying the end of the four-and-a-half year series. Finally, a song called "In My Youth", originally by Australian band Noiseworks, performed by Kelley Abbey (JoJo) was played over the final end credits.

== Cast ==
=== Original Cast ===
- Elly Fielding (Penny Cook) 1989–91 (episodes 1–209)
- Bob Brown (Tony Martin) 1989–92 (1–384)
- Sarah McKillop (Katrina Sedgwick) 1989 (appeared from episode 2 to 46; although credited for episode 1, she did not appear. Credited until episode 48)
- Chris Patchett (Paul Kelman) 1989–90 (1–171)
- Lisa Bennett (Alyssa-Jane Cook) 1989–92 (1–290)
- George Sullivan (Leslie Dayman) 1989–93 (1–404)
- Martha O'Dare (Cecily Polson) 1989–93 (1–404)
- Paul Berry (Warren Jones) 1989–91 (1–198)
- Rhonda Berry (Melanie Salomon) 1989 (episodes 1–31, credited until episode 36)
- Ernie Patchett (Vic Rooney) 1989–93 (1–200, 276–404)
- Claire Fielding (Brooke "Mikey" Anderson) 1989–92 (1–209, 235–320)

=== Further cast ===
- David Fielding (Noel Hodda) 1989–91 (recurring 1–38, regular 39–209)
- Helen Kennedy (Dinah Shearing) 1989 (recurring 2–39)
- Lily Patchett (Lois Ramsay) (guest 3–4, 15–18)
- Stanley "Wheels" Kovac (Marcus Graham) 1989 (guest 19–20; then appeared as a regular from episode 51 to 82, but credited from episode 49 to 86); 1991–92 (regular 235–302)
- Margaret Bennett (Briony Behets) 1989–90 (recurring 25–62, guest 112)
- Sam Bulmer (Serge Lazareff) 1989 (recurring 25–58)
- Miki Fallon (Peta Toppano) 1989 (recurring 28–46)
- Dr Ben Stewart (Andrew Clarke) 1989 (guest 31–38)
- Daniel Windsor (Chris Orchard) 1989–90 (45–106)
- Toni Windsor (Toni Pearen) 1989–92 (48–368)
- Tom Windsor (Andrew Ferguson) 1989–90 (regular 48–106, guest 150–155)
- Simon Windsor (Trent Newman) 1989–90 (48–106)
- Sally Windsor (Emma Scanlon) 1989–90 (48–106)
- Jennifer St. James (Virginia Hey) 1989–90 (50–105)
- Alice Sullivan (Marianne Howard) 1989–1992 (regular 54–290), 1993 (guest 400–404)
- Mike Kominski (Sean Scully) 1989 (guest 59–67)
- Megan Patchett (née Bromley) (Lisbeth Kennelly) 1989–90 (62–171)
- Veronica Bromley (Rona Coleman) 1989 (recurring 63–82)
- Jonathan Bromley (Peter Sumner) 1989 (recurring 64–82)
- JoJo Adams (Kelley Abbey) 1989 (guest 71–82, regular 257–404)
- Lara McCoy (Gennie Nevinson) (guest 73–78)
- Harley Brown (Malcolm Kennard) 1989–92 (79–236)
- Abby Rossiter (Chelsea Brown) 1989–90 (85–171)
- Auntie Vi Patchett (Bunney Brooke) 1990–91 (94–220)
- Sonny Bennett (Richard Huggett) 1990 (109–172)
- Kim Talbot (Rebecca Saunders) 1990 (109–166)
- PC Max Simmons (Bruce Samazan) 1990–93 (114–404)
- Nikki Spencer (Melissa Tkautz) 1990–93 (160–281, 370–404)
- Zac Spencer (Daniel Knight) 1990–91 (160–272)
- Michael Sturgess (Graham Harvey) 1990–91 (guest 141–148, regular 173–262)
- Dr Susan Franklin (Anne Tenney) 1990 (guest 171–176)
- Sheridan Sturgess (Kate Raison) 1990–92 (178–302)
- Craig "C.J." Jones (Adrian Lee) 1990–92 (186–368)
- Virginia Travis (Julieanne Newbould) 1991 (203–254)
- Joey Valentine (Lorry D'ercole) 1991–92 (239–393)
- Mary Patchett (Joan Sydney) 1991–92 (224–276)
- Steven Richardson (Vince Martin) 1991–92 (248–290, Olav Evensen recast from episode 299–318)
- Elly Fielding No. 2 (Diane Craig) 1991–93 (recast, 252–404)
- Sergeant Roy Harrison (John Clayton) 1991 (guest 265–270)
- Jamie Newman (Scott McRae) 1992–93 (277–396)
- Penny O'Brien (Josephine Mitchell) 1992–93 (284–404)
- Charlie O'Brien (Prue McGuire) 1992–93 (286–404)
- PC Sam Farrell (Simon Baker) 1992–93 (293–404)
- Amy Preston (Rebecca Rigg) 1992 (guest 299–320)
- Jack Brown (Andrew Williams) 1992–93 (321–404)
- Bonnie Tate (Melissa Bell) 1992–93 (347–404) †
- Laura Fielding (Antoinette Byron) 1993 (361–404)
- Sally McKinnon (Joanna Lockwood) 1992–93 (369–404)

== E Street: The Music ==
When E Street started, there was a unique soundtrack created by Twilight Productions, and during 1989 as the series was establishing its own identity, Forrest Redlich made a deal with Australian record company CBS so that popular contemporary hits could be played in every episode. The international hits "Down Under" and "Who Can It Be Now?" by Men at Work, and, "Live It Up" by Mental as Anything are played on the radio regularly in several 1989 episodes. "Live it Up" was also used in an elaborate commercial to promote E Street where the (early 1990) cast perform a specially choreographed dance to the song on the set of Patchett's Pacific pub.

During 1990, music became a key aspect of the growing success of E Street and music videos and musical performances began to be incorporated into episodes. The band "Undercover", led by Wheels's friend JoJo (Kelley Abbey), performed in 1989 episodes, and eventually went on tour (in the storyline). Later when she returned to Westside in 1991, "The Liquidators" were the regular band performing in the show. Background music played on radios, and on the Jukebox at Patchett's Pacific, now including songs to promote music released on the offshoot Westside Records music label.

By 1991, some of the actors and actresses, namely Melissa Tkautz, Bruce Samazan and Toni Pearen, released singles, some of which were big hits in Australia. Tkautz had the 6th biggest selling single of 1991 with her No. 1 dance hit "Read My Lips", and the follow-up, "Sexy (Is The Word)", made No. 3 the same year, all thanks to their inclusion on E Street. Bruce Samazan also released a single, a rap record called "One of a Kind", but it was not a success.

The Maybe Dolls "Nervous Kid", Euphoria's "Love You Right", and Wendy Mathews "The Day You Went Away" were all big hits thanks to their inclusion in episodes of E Street.

After the end of E Street in 1993, a CD and cassette compilation of some of the songs that were featured in the show was released called, E Street: The Music.

== Episodes ==
E Street was produced as two one-hour episodes per week, but during the first season, output was reduced to one hour a week for five weeks between 11 May and 8 June 1989 as production underwent its first revamp. When it launched, there was a two-hour introductory episode, "Tuesday", and the following evening, episode two, "An Ounce of Prevention", also aired in a special two-hour block. The seasons of E Street consisted of the following episodes:

- Season One (1989) – episodes 1 to 86
- Season Two (1990) – episodes 87 to 177
- Season Three (1991) – episodes 178 to 276
- Season Four (1992) – episodes 277 to 368
- Season Five (1993) – episodes 369 to 404

== Broadcast history ==
Australia
Network Ten
Wednesday 25 January 1989 – Thursday 20 May 1993
Wednesday and Thursdays, 19:30–20:30. Reduced to one episode a week between May and June 1989.
Repeated the first 184 episodes (1989 and 1990 seasons) during 2003 at 12:00 .

United Kingdom
Sky One started the series on Sunday, 5 April 1992 with episode 1. Sky then commenced the series from episode 43, twice daily, 13:00–13:30, and repeated later, 18:30–19:00, from Monday, 6 April 1992.

Episodes were heavily customised and re-edited by Westside Productions for broadcast on Sky One. Each episode of E Street was split into two half-hour editions, and stripped Monday to Friday. Sky episodes also replaced the original opening and closing theme tune with the theme and openings used on later episodes in Australia.

When E Street launched in the UK in April 1992, Sky One heavily publicised the launch of their new Australian soap, and promoted it with the taglines, "Meet Your New Neighbours on E Street" and "Your New Neighbours Are Moving In". This slogan could be seen across the country on double-decker buses, billboards and teen magazine advertisements.E Street actors Tony Martin (Bob), Alyssa-Jane Cook (Lisa), Marcus Graham (Wheels), Leslie Dayman (George), Cecily Polson (Martha) and Vic Rooney (Ernie) all flew to Britain to appear in advertisements promoting the launch of the soap. Notably absent in the campaign was leading actress Penny Cook who had already left E Street by the time it began airing in Britain. In the bestselling teen magazine, Smash Hits, Sky ran a full-page advertising campaign with the catchline: "It's Time You Moved In" which featured (yet to appear) Sonny Bennett with the headline, "Mad, Bad and Dangerous to know", and another one with Wheels and Lisa which claimed, "Tough but gentle, strong but sweet". During the first 12 months it aired in the UK, E Street became one of the highest rated programmes on Sky One, averaging around 750,000–1 million viewers an episode. This was at a time when there was an available audience of only around 2.5 million, due to Sky only being available via the Astra satellite and selected cable areas.

Notably, during the Sonny Bennett storyline, where three characters are killed in a car bomb explosion (episodes 170–171), in the UK, where E Street aired in an earlier timeslot, these episodes were shown 19–24 March 1993 and were preceded by a warning to viewers that the episode contained scenes that some may find upsetting, as well as removing the actual explosion of the car entirely. Similarly, edits were made to the 'Mr Bad' storyline, particularly the murders of Virginia Travis and Michael Sturgess, which were both cut for UK broadcast.

Six months after E Street was cancelled by Network Ten, during October 1993, Sky One moved E Street to weekend daytime slots and it was briefly shown in the original hour-long format on Saturdays at 18:00–19:00, and Sundays at 13:00–14:00. However, on Tuesday, 4 January 1994, E Street returned to half hours episodes in the 18:30–19:00 timeslot with the afternoon repeat now at 12:30–13:00. Finally, September 1994, E Street was moved to the 19:00–19:00 slot and the last episode 404 aired on Monday 27-Tuesday 28 February 1995 as two half-hour editions.

== Theme and Titles ==
The original episodes of E Street had a lengthy opening title sequence made up of clips from the pilot and the first few episodes of the show, and was accompanied by a laid back, saxophone driven, jazzy theme tune which was credited to the composer, Ashley Irwin, who'd also composed the theme tune to Richmond Hill, the short-lived soap opera E Street replaced on Network Ten. The original score was produced by Twilight Productions and was noticeably different from the music cues used on Australian soap operas of the same era. Originally, each episode had an individual title, but these were dropped at episode 34, entitled Fishing, after which the series adopted a more serialised format. When the series effectively relaunched at episode 39, the entire opening sequence, including the E Street logo, was redesigned and a much pacier montage of the contract cast was now linked together with a paintbrush wipe effect. The title credits were now distinctive shades of white and blue, and the new E Street logo was underlined with a stripe of red graffiti. The opening theme tune was also remixed into a much faster, brighter, and punchier arrangement, but the closing theme was retained for the time being.

This design of opening titles lasted until episode 134, featuring only minor alterations as characters came and went, and was updated for episodes 49 and 87.

From episode 135, a brand new theme tune was introduced and a much shorter title sequence was adopted. This consisted of a short, 10-second saxophone riff edited from the new main theme tune along with two opposing long shots of Westside and the E Street title card used at the beginning of episodes 39 to 134. The cast were no longer credited in the opening titles.

This short style of opening lasted for the rest of the remaining 1990 episodes, and all of the 1991 and 1992 seasons, and was used until episode 368 – the final episode of the 1992 season.

From episode 369, the first episode of the 1993 season, a new sequence following an aerial view of Eden Street with the E Street logo forming, and then various establishing shots of Westside with creator, writer, director and producer credits. The theme tune changed to a new mix of the previous theme but was of a noticeably softer arrangement. This style of music and credits lasted until the final episode.

The regular cast were not included in the opening titles again and they were subsequently moved to the end credits. This sequence had the cast and production credits scrolling over an aerial shot of Westside during nighttime. There were a few different versions of the credits backdrop: one was of a sunset over Westside, another was a panning shot of the docks area in darkness. From the start of the 1993 season, a film of Westside during daytime debuted. The original Australian end credits contained several sponsorship credits that were removed from international broadcasts.

As noted, different titles and a revised music soundtrack were used on the international versions of E Street. For example, Sky One episodes did not use the first theme tune at all, and the original music soundtrack was replaced with contemporary songs. Sky One episodes notably adopted the 1993 title sequence from episode 135 (aired in Australia in 1990) before reverting to the original short version when the series was moved to weekend hourly slots. This sequence was used on Sky's episodes from episode 252 through to episode 367.

== Awards ==
E Street and the cast were nominated for and won several Logie Awards during the show's four-year run.

Year	Category	Nominee(s)	Result	Ref.
1990	Most Popular New Talent	Marcus Graham	Nominated	
1991	Most Popular Actor	Richard Huggett	Nominated	
1991	Most Popular Actor	Tony Martin	Nominated	
1991	Most Popular Actress	Penny Cook	Nominated	
1991	Most Popular New Talent	Richard Huggett	Won	
1991	Most Popular Series	E Street	Nominated	
1992	Most Popular Actor	Marcus Graham	Nominated	
1992	Most Popular Actor	Bruce Samazan	Won	
1992	Most Popular Actress	Kate Raison	Nominated	
1992	Most Popular New Talent	Melissa Tkautz	Nominated	
1992	Most Popular Series	E Street	Won	
1993	Gold Logie	Bruce Samazan	Nominated	
1993	Most Popular Actor	Bruce Samazan	Nominated	
1993	Most Popular Actress	Toni Pearen	Nominated	
1993	Most Popular New Talent	Simon Baker	Won	
1993	Most Popular Series	E Street	Nominated	

== Reunion ==
On 20 August 2006, several cast members were reunited on the Australian TV series Where Are They Now, broadcast on Seven Network. The cast members that appeared on the programme were Marcus Graham (Wheels), Alyssa-Jane Cook (Lisa Bennett), Melissa Tkautz (Nikki Spencer), Bruce Samazan (Max Simmons), Melissa Bell (Bonnie Tate) and Brooke Mikey Anderson (Claire Fielding). The studio guests were joined via a satellite link-up to Vince Martin who starred as the show's most memorable character, Mr Bad.

== Home media ==
Like several Australian soap operas, E Street has been released on DVD. Up to January 2020, episodes 1 to 96 and 253 to 292 have been released on DVD.

=== The Best of Mr Bad Volume 1 ===
In August 2007, E Street was released on DVD for the first time through Umbrella Entertainment. The first boxset, called The Best of Mr Bad Volume 1, is a five-disc set and includes twenty consecutive episodes from 253 to 272, that originally aired in 1991 (1993–94 in the UK). The set tells the beginning of the notorious Mr Bad storyline which achieved massive viewing figures when they originally aired. Commentaries on episode 272 are provided by Bruce Samazan (Max) and Melissa Tkautz (Nikki) with Australian soap expert and author, Andrew Mercado.

=== Mr Bad's Revenge Part 2 ===
A second five-disc DVD set, Mr Bad's Revenge Part 2, was released on 3 December 2007 and contains 19 consecutive episodes from 273 to 292, which originally aired in 1992, and continued the long-running Steven Richardson/Mr Bad storyline. Episode 288 features revealing commentary provided by E Street creator and executive producer, Forrest Redlich.

=== E Street: Collection One ===
On 4 December 2019 (19 November in some markets), the first 96 episodes covering the whole of season one and the beginning of season two, was released on Region 4 as E Street – Collection One through Via Vision. Region 2 (UK compatible) is available to order on some niche mail-order websites.

The collection contains no extra features. Controversially, the first reel of episode 1 and all of episode 2 were taken from "a low quality source", which has been identified as a YouTube channel for a dedicated E Street fan site, which mainly uploaded off-air recordings. ViaVision claimed on the release that the master tape for episode 1 was incomplete and episode 2's master tape no longer exists.

The release of E Street: Collection One on Region 2 allows fans in the UK an opportunity to view episodes 2 to 42 for the first time, and subsequent episodes in their original format.

In January 2020, the release of a follow-up DVD, E Street: Collection Two, was forecast but not yet confirmed.

As of October 2020 it is unlikely there will be any more collections released due to the low sales of E Street Collection One.

Title	Format	Ep #	Discs	Region 4 (Australia)	Special features	Distributors
The Best of Mr Bad (Volume 01)	DVD	20 (Episodes 253–272)	5	August 2007	Commentary on Episode 272 with Bruce Samazan (Max) and Melissa Tkautz (Nikki) Umbrella Trailers	Umbrella Entertainment
The Best of Mr Bad (Volume 02)	DVD	19 (Episodes 273–292)	5	3 December 2007	Commentary on Episode 288 with E Street creator Forrest Redlich Umbrella Trailers	Umbrella Entertainment
E Street (Collection 01)	DVD	Episodes 01-96	25	4 December 2019	None	Via Vision Entertainment

== Remakes ==
Like several other Australian soap operas, (The Restless Years and Sons and Daughters, for example), there are two European remakes of E Street. Creator Forrest Redlich commented in 2007:

"Germany made its own version of it; Belgium made its own version of the show... all using our original scripts and I think it ran for about ten years..."

=== Wittekerke ===
In Belgium, the Belgian TV channel vtm remade E Street in a Dutch-language version called Wittekerke – in a literal translation to English, the title means Whitechurch. Production began in 1993 shortly after the series on which it was based was cancelled in Australia.

Wittekerke followed similar storylines and characters during first couple of seasons, although some changes were made due to cultural differences. It was the intention to only make 1 season with 32 episodes. However, Wittekerke became a success and 15 seasons (1067 episodes) were originally aired between 1993 and 2008 – therefore it outlasted E Street.

=== Westerdeich ===
In Germany, E Street was called Westerdeich This title in English literally means West-dike. A 'deich', or dike, is an embankment, or a dam, or levee) – but a more accurate translation would be Westside. It was set in the titular village on the Frisian coast in Northern Germany.

Creator Forrest Redlich mentioned on the audio commentary featured on the DVD release, Mr Bad's Revenge Part 2, that the series was called "E-Straße" in Germany. This is a literal translation of the series original title, "E-Street", into the German language, but it was not used. It is likely however that "E-Straße" was the working title when Westerdeich originally went into production in late 1994, using E Street scripts for episodes 43 through to 80.

Westerdeich began on RTL 29 January 1995 and ran for one season of 37 hour-long episodes. The serial aired weekly on Sunday evenings for all of its run.
