= Sheila E. discography =

American singer discography

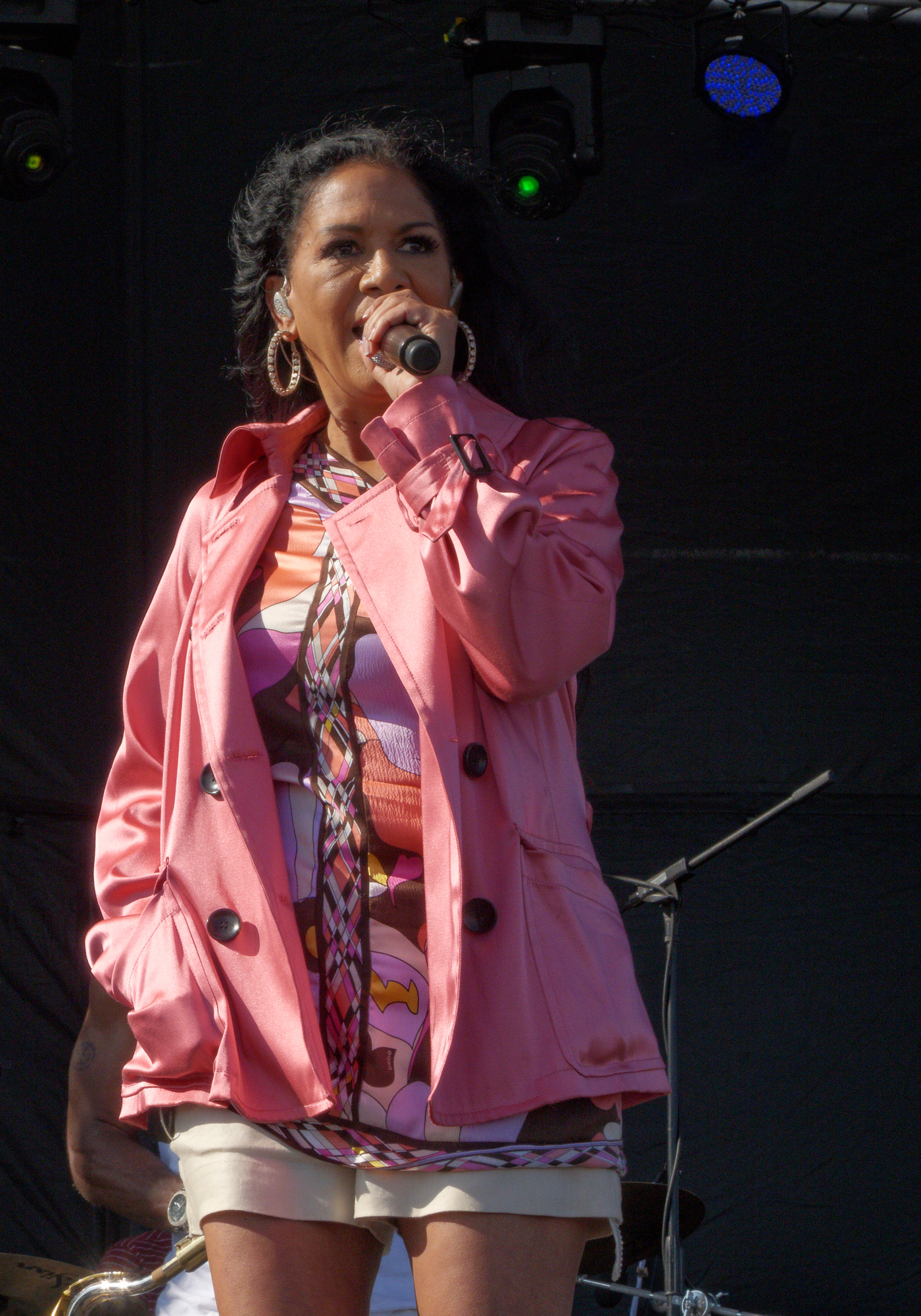
- Sheila E. performing in 2014
- Studio albums: 10
- Live albums: 2
- Singles: 26
- Video albums: 1

American singer-songwriter Sheila E. has released ten studio albums, two collaborative albums, one live albums, one live video album, one extended play, and twenty-six singles.

In 1977, Escovedo and her father Pete Escovedo released an album called Solo Two, credited to Pete and Sheila Escovedo. Their follow-up album Happy Together was released in 1978 on Fantasy Records. In 1984, Sheila released her first solo studio album The Glamorous Life on Warner Bros. Records. The album became certified gold by RIAA. Her follow-up album also earned a gold certification by the RIAA. She released two more albums on Warner Bros. Records: Sheila E. (1987) and Sex Cymbal (1991). She released two jazz albums Writes of Passage (2000) and Heaven (2001) on Concord Records.

In 2013, she released her seventh album Icon on her own independent record label Stilettoflats Music. She also released three more albums: Iconic: Message 2 America (2017), Hella Fonk E (2022), and Bailar (2024) on Stilettoflats Music.

== Albums ==
=== Studio albums ===
List of studio albums, with selected chart positions and certifications
Title	Album details	Peak chart positions			Certifications
Title	Album details	US	US R&B	AUS	Certifications
The Glamorous Life	Released: June 4, 1984; Label: Warner Bros.; Format: CD, LP, cassette, digital download	28	7	68	RIAA: Gold
Romance 1600	Released: August 26, 1985; Label: Paisley Park, Warner Bros.; Format: CD, LP, cassette, digital download	50	12	—	RIAA: Gold
Sheila E.	Released: February 24, 1987; Label: Paisley Park, Warner Bros.; Format: CD, LP, cassette, digital download	56	24	88	
Sex Cymbal	Released: April 10, 1991; Label: Warner Bros.; Format: CD, LP, cassette, digital download	146	56	117	
Writes of Passage ^{[a]}	Released: October 10, 2000; Label: Concord; Format: CD, digital download	—	—	—	
Heaven ^{[a]}	Released: August 28, 2001; Label: Concord; Format: CD, digital download	—	—	—	
Icon	Released: November 8, 2013; Label: Stiletto Flats, Moosicus; Format: CD, digital download	—	—	—	
Iconic: Message 4 America	Released: August 17, 2017; Label: Stiletto Flats; Format: CD, digital download, streaming	—	—	—	
Hella Fonk E ^{[a]}	Released: 2022^{[b]}; Label: Stiletto Flats; Format: CD, digital download, vinyl, streaming	—	—	—	
Bailar	Released: April 5, 2024; Label: Stiletto Flats; Format: CD, digital download, streaming	—	—	—	

=== Collaborative albums ===
Title	Album details
Solo Two	Released: 1977; With Pete Escovedo; Label: Fantasy; Formats: LP
Happy Together	Released: 1978; With Pete Escovedo; Label: Fantasy; Formats: LP

=== Live albums ===
Title	Album details
Live Romance 1600	Released: June 16, 1986; Label: Warner Reprise Video; Formats: VHS, LaserDisc
House of Blues ^{[c]}	Released: 1998; Label: n/a; Formats: CD

== Singles ==
List of singles as lead artist, with selected chart positions and certifications, showing year released and album name
Title	Year	Peak chart positions										Album
Title	Year	US	US R&B	US Dance	AUS	AUT	IRE	NLD	NZ	SWI	UK	Album
"The Glamorous Life"	1984	7	9	1	11	—	—	3	—	—	96	The Glamorous Life
"The Belle of St. Mark"	1984	34	68	—	16	—	15	8	5	—	18	The Glamorous Life
"Noon Rendezvous"	1985	—	—	—	—	—	—	—	—	—	—	The Glamorous Life
"Sister Fate"	1985	102	36	81	—	—	—	—	—	—	—	Romance 1600
"Bedtime Story"	1985	—	—	—	—	—	—	—	—	—	—	Romance 1600
"A Love Bizarre"	1985	11	2	1	—	14	—	9	—	16	76	Romance 1600
"Holly Rock"	1986	—	—	—	—	—	—	8	—	—	—	Krush Groove (soundtrack)
"Love On a Blue Train"	1986	—	—	—	—	—	—	—	—	—	—	Sheila E.
"Hold Me"	1987	68	3	—	—	—	—	54	—	—	—	Sheila E.
"Koo Koo"	1987	—	35	—	—	—	—	—	—	—	—	Sheila E.
"Sex Cymbal"	1991	—	32	—	88	—	—	—	—	—	—	Sex Cymbal
"Droppin' Like Flies"	1991	—	77	23	113	—	—	—	—	—	—	Sex Cymbal
"Cry Baby"	1992	—	—	—	—	—	—	—	—	—	—	Sex Cymbal
"Glorious Train"	2009	—	—	—	—	—	—	—	—	—	—	Non-album single
"Mona Lisa" (featuring Lucia Parker and Gisa Vatcky)	2013	—	—	—	—	—	—	—	—	—	—	Icon
"Fiesta" (featuring B. Slade)	2014	—	—	—	—	—	—	—	—	—	—	Icon
"Lovely Day"	2014	—	—	—	—	—	—	—	—	—	—	Icon
"Who I Am Now"	2014	—	—	—	—	—	—	—	—	—	—	Icon
"Girl Meets Boy"	2016	—	—	—	—	—	—	—	—	—	—	Non-album single
"Funky National Anthem: Message 2 America"	2017	—	—	—	—	—	—	—	—	—	—	Iconic: Message 4 America
"What the World Needs Now"	2018	—	—	—	—	—	—	—	—	—	—	Iconic: Message 4 America
"Yes We Can" (featuring Angela Davis)	2018	—	—	—	—	—	—	—	—	—	—	Iconic: Message 4 America
"Everyday People"	2018	—	—	—	—	—	—	—	—	—	—	Iconic: Message 4 America
"No Line" (featuring Snoop Dogg)	2019	—	—	—	—	—	—	—	—	—	—	Non-album singles
"Lemon Cake"	2020	—	—	—	—	—	—	—	—	—	—	Non-album singles
"Bailar" (featuring Luis Enrique)	2021	—	—	—	—	—	—	—	—	—	—	Bailar
"Bemba Colorá" (featuring Gloria Estefan and Mimy Succar)	2024	—	—	—	—	—	—	—	—	—	—	Bailar

== Notes ==
a Credited to Sheila E. and the E-Train
b Released first in 2022 on compact disc and vinyl. Later released in 2024 to digital music and streaming platforms.
c Limited edition release
