= Sex symbol (disambiguation) =

A sex symbol is a sexually attractive celebrity.

Sex symbol may also refer to:

- Gender symbol, a graphical symbol to denote gender
- An object or concept regarded to be symbolic of masculinity or femininity
- Sex object (disambiguation)
- The Sex Symbol, a 1974 TV movie starring Connie Stevens

== See also ==
- Sex Cymbal, a 1991 album by Sheila E.
  - "Sex Cymbal" (song), lead single from the album
