= Sheila E. (album) =

Studio album by Sheila E.
- Released: February 24, 1987
- Recorded: 1986–1987
- Studio: Sunset Sound, Hollywood, California; Paisley Park, Chanhassen, Minnesota; Capitol, Hollywood, California; Fantasy, Berkeley, California; Cheshire Sound
- Genre: Funk; pop; R&B
- Length: 39:35
- Label: Paisley Park; Warner Bros.
- Producer: Sheila E.; David Z

Sheila E. chronology
| Romance 1600 (1985) | Sheila E. (1987) | Sex Cymbal (1991) |

Professional ratings
Review scores
| Source | Rating |
|---|---|
| AllMusic | 3/5 stars |
| Robert Christgau | B+ |
| The Rolling Stone Album Guide | 2/5 stars |

Sheila E. is the third solo album by Sheila E., released on Paisley Park Records/Warner Bros. Records in 1987.

Two singles were released from the album in the US, "Hold Me" and "Koo Koo", although both failed to make a major impact on the Hot 100. "Love on a Blue Train" was the first single released in Japan. The album is notable for its Latin influence and prominent presence in this hybrid of jazz, rock, funk and salsa.

The album has the earliest recorded appearance of members from the group Tony! Toni! Toné!, who Sheila E. attempted to bring to Paisley Park, but Prince did not sign the group. Almost a decade later, in 1996, Sheila E. appeared on their final album, House of Music.

== Critical reception ==
The Rolling Stone Album Guide called the album "flat and mechanical, boasting some rhythmic flash but not enough melody to make it worthwhile."

== Track listing ==
All tracks are written by Sheila E. and Prince, except where noted.

Side one
| No. | Title | Writer(s) | Length |
|---|---|---|---|
| 1. | "One Day (I'm Gonna Make You Mine)" | | 4:47 |
| 2. | "Wednesday Like a River" | Sheila E., Constance Guzman, Levi Seacer, Jr. | 3:25 |
| 3. | "Hold Me" | Sheila E., Constance Guzman, Eddie Mininfield | 5:04 |
| 4. | "Faded Photographs" | Sheila E., Constance Guzman, Samuel Domingo, Boni Boyer | 4:11 |
| 5. | "Koo Koo" | | 3:24 |

Side two
| No. | Title | Writer(s) | Length |
|---|---|---|---|
| 6. | "Pride and the Passion" | | 4:05 |
| 7. | "Boy's Club" | | 3:56 |
| 8. | "Soul Salsa" | Sheila E., Norbert Stachel, Levi Seacer, Jr. | 3:08 |
| 9. | "Hon E Man" | Sheila E., Constance Guzman, Levi Seacer, Jr. | 3:22 |
| 10. | "Love on a Blue Train" | | 5:33 |

== Personnel ==
Sourced from the album liner notes and Duane Tudahl

- Sheila E. – vocals, percussion
- Levi Seacer, Jr. – guitar, bass guitar, keyboards, backing vocals
- Juan Escovedo – percussion
- Boni Boyer – keyboards, backing vocals
- Timothy Riley – drums
- Norbert Stachel – soprano, alto, tenor and baritone saxophones, flute, clarinet
- Carl Wheeler – keyboards, backing vocals
- Rafael Wiggins, Jr. – bass guitar, backing vocals
- Peter Michael Escovedo – percussion
- Eric Leeds – saxophone
- Matt Blistan (aka Atlanta Bliss) – trumpet
- Eddie Minnifield – backing vocals
- Carlos Rios – guitar
- Howard Kenney – backing vocals
- Steph Birnbaum – guitar
- Prince – backing vocals (1, 5–7, 10), electric guitar (1, 5–7, 10), Ensoniq Mirage (1, 5, 10), Fairlight CMI (1, 5), Yamaha DX7 (6, 7), Oberheim OB-8 (1), piano (5, 7), bass guitar (6, 7, 10), Linn LM-1 (5, 6), LinnDrum (7), drums (5), Simmons SDSV (1, 10), handclaps (10)

Technical

- Coke Johnson, David Leonard, Peggy McCreary Leonard – recording engineers
- Jeff DeMorris, Mike Kloster, Steve Himmelfarb, Leslie Ann Jones, Chuck Webb, Thom Kidd, Tom Wright – second engineers
- Mary Ann Dibs – art direction and design
- Jeff Katz – photography
- Chris Bellman – mastering at Bernie Grundman Mastering

== Charts ==
Chart performance for Sheila E.
| Chart (1987) | Peak position |
|---|---|
| Australian Albums (Kent Music Report) | 88 |
| Dutch Albums (Album Top 100) | 68 |
| Swedish Albums (Sverigetopplistan) | 24 |
| Swiss Albums (Schweizer Hitparade) | 20 |
| US Billboard 200 | 56 |
| US Top R&B/Hip-Hop Albums (Billboard) | 24 |
