= Holly Rock =

Single by Sheila E.

from the album Krush Groove: Music from the Motion Picture
- B-side: "Toy Box"
- Released: 1986
- Recorded: April 24, 1985
- Studio: Sunset Sound, Los Angeles
- Genre: R&B; funk; rap
- Length: 4:56 (album version); 3:58 (single version); 6:35 (extended version)
- Label: Warner Bros.
- Songwriter(s): Prince, Sheila E.
- Producer(s): Prince, Sheila E.

Sheila E. singles chronology
"A Love Bizarre" (1985)	"Holly Rock" (1986)	"Hold Me" (1987)

"Holly Rock" is a song written and produced by Prince and performed by Sheila E. who also received writing and production credits. The song appeared on the soundtrack of the 1985 film Krush Groove, with Sheila E. performing the song in the film. It is a high-energy rap number with Sheila E. rapping throughout most of the song. The song did not chart except in the Low Countries, but it became a fan favorite. The 7" single release was backed by "Toy Box", a track from Romance 1600.

== Music video ==
A live performance of the song was used as the music video.

== Background ==
"Holly Rock" is the sixth track (and only Prince-related track) on the movie Krush Groove soundtrack. It was released as the album's fifth single nine months after the album's release.

Basic tracking took place on April 24, 1985, at Sunset Sound in Hollywood, California (the day after "Evolsidog" and four days before "All My Dreams" and "Kiss").

In 2019 the original Prince version of the song was released on the posthumous Prince album Originals.

== Formats and track listings ==
US 7"

1. "Holly Rock" (edit) – 3:58
2. "Toy Box – 5:32

US 12" promo

1. "Holly Rock" (extended version) – 6:35
2. "Holly Rock" (7" single edit) – 3:58

Originals release

1. "Holly Rock" – 6:38
2. "Holly Rock" (music video edit) – 3:56
3. "Holly Rock" (edit) – 3:47

== Personnel ==
Credits sourced from Duane Tudahl

- Sheila E. – lead and backing vocals, drums, bongos, timbales, cowbells
- Prince – backing vocals, electric guitar, Oberheim OB-8, bass guitar, Linn LM-1, cymbal
- Eddie M. – saxophone

== Charts ==
=== Weekly charts ===
Weekly chart performance for "Holly Rock"
Chart (1986)	Peak position
Belgium (Ultratop 50 Flanders)	8
Netherlands (Dutch Top 40)	8
Netherlands (Single Top 100)	8

=== Year-end charts ===
Year-end chart performance for "Holly Rock"
Chart (1986)	Position
Belgium (Ultratop Flanders)	74
Netherlands (Dutch Top 40)	86
