= Sex object (disambiguation) =

Sex object may refer to:

- Sexual objectification
- An object of sexual attraction
- Sex symbol, a famous person or fictional character widely regarded to possess excessive sexual attractiveness

== Music and books ==
- "Sex Object", a song by Kraftwerk from Electric Café
- Sex Objects, a 2004 album by The Briefs
- Sex Objects: Art and the Dialectics of Desire, contemporary art book by Jennifer Doyle 2006
- Sex Object, a 2016 book by Jessica Valenti

== See also ==
- Object sexuality, a form of sexuality focused on particular inanimate objects
- Sex symbol (disambiguation)
