= Icon (Sheila E. album) =

Studio album by Sheila E.
- Released: November 8, 2013
- Recorded: 2010–2013
- Genre: R&B; pop; Latin pop
- Length: 55:55
- Label: Mooscious; Stilettoflats Music

Sheila E. chronology
Heaven (2001)	Icon (2013)	Iconic: Message 4 America (2017)

Singles from Icon
- 1. "Mona Lisa" Released: March 11, 2014; 2. "Fiesta" Released: May 5, 2014; 3. "Lovely Day" Released: August 10, 2014; 4. "Who I Am Now" Released: November 21, 2014

Professional ratings
Review scores
Source	Rating
The Guardian	3/5 stars

Icon is the seventh album from Sheila E, released on Mooscious Records.

== Track listing ==
All tracks are written by Sheila E., unless otherwise noted, while "Leader of the Band" was co-written by Prince.

Icon track listing
No.	Title	Length
1.	"Butterfly (Interlude)"	1:17
2.	"Mona Lisa" (featuring Gisa Vatcky and Lucía Parker)	5:07
3.	"Lovely Day"	5:00
4.	"I'll Give You That"	4:10
5.	"Rockstar" (featuring Bobby G.)	4:00
6.	"Samba (Interlude)"	0:57
7.	"Nasty Thang" (featuring MC Lyte)	3:23
8.	"Leader of the Band" (featuring The E. Family and Prince)	4:35
9.	"Turn It Around (Interlude)"	0:33
10.	"Girl Like Me" (featuring Ledisi)	4:08
11.	"Who I Am Now"	4:08
12.	"Old Skool" (featuring Eddie M, J.A.i., Tha Profit)	4:25
13.	"Now Is the Hour (Interlude)" (featuring Moms Escovedo)	0:52
Total length:		32:45

- The US edition contains three additional songs: "Fiesta", "Born and Raised" and "Oakland n da House".
