= Sister Fate =

Single by Sheila E.

from the album Romance 1600
- B-side: "Save the People"
- Released: July 26, 1985
- Recorded: January 9, 1985 (tracking); January 15, 1985 (overdubs)
- Studio: Cheshire Sound Studios, Atlanta, GA (tracking) (mobile studio outside) The Summit, Houston, TX (overdubs)
- Genre: R&B, funk
- Length: 3:50 (album version); 3:39 (single version); 5:45 (extended 12" version)
- Label: Paisley Park, Warner Bros.
- Songwriter: Sheila E. (Prince)
- Producers: Prince, Sheila E.

Sheila E. singles chronology
| "Noon Rendezvous" (1985) | "Sister Fate" (1985) | "Bedtime Story" (1985) |

"Sister Fate" is a song by Sheila E. from the album Romance 1600. It was released as the first single from the album in 1985. The album version of the song features an organ and percussion intro and has a running time of 3:50; the single version omits the intro and has a running time of 3:39.

== Music video ==
The video introduced a new image for Sheila E., dressed in a brocaded "cloud jacket" that harkened back to Prince's "cloud suit" from his contemporaneously (1985) released video "Raspberry Beret". At the timestamp of 3:06 within the video, an image of Prince from "Raspberry Beret" is superimposed for one second over a newspaper graphic with the headline "WHO IS SHEILA E.'S MYSTERY LOVE?"

== Chart performance ==
The song stalled on the charts; it went no higher than number 36 on the R&B charts, and did not chart on the Hot 100. It peaked at number 8 on the Bubbling Under Hot 100 chart. Because of the underperformance of "Sister Fate", the third single, "A Love Bizarre" (which featured Prince) was rush-released.

== Formats and track listings ==
US 7"

1. "Sister Fate" (edit) – 3:39
2. "Sister Fate" (instrumental) – 3:39

US 12"

1. "Sister Fate" (extended) – 5:45
2. "Save the People" – 8:28

== Personnel ==
Credits from Duane Tudahl and Benoît Clerc

- Sheila E. – lead and backing vocals, drums, Simmons SDSV, congas, cowbells, timbales, shaker, cymbal
- Prince – Yamaha DX7, Hammond organ, piano, bass guitar, Linn LM-1, handclaps
- Ken Grey – Yamaha DX7 (album intro)
- Steph Birnbaum – electric guitars
- Benny Rietveld – bass guitar (album intro)
- Eddie M. – saxophone

== Charts ==
Chart performance for "Sister Fate"
| Chart (1986) | Peak position |
|---|---|
| Australia (Kent Music Report) | 81 |
| US Billboard Bubbling Under Hot 100 Singles | 8 |
| US Billboard Hot R&B/Hip-Hop Songs | 36 |
| US Billboard Hot Dance Music/Maxi-Singles Sales | 26 |
