= Droppin' Like Flies =

1992 single by Sheila E.

Single by Sheila E.

from the album Sex Cymbal
- Released: 1992
- Genre: House, latin, R&B
- Length: 5:26 (album version); 4:10 (radio edit); 3:38 (radio mix)
- Label: Warner Bros.
- Songwriter(s): Sheila E.
- Producer(s): David Gamson, Peter Michael (album version); Ricky Crespo, Mark Spoon (remixes)

Sheila E. singles chronology
"Sex Cymbal" (1991)	"Droppin' Like Flies" (1992)	"Cry Baby" (1992)

"Droppin' Like Flies" is a 1991 song by Sheila E., and the second single released from her album, Sex Cymbal. The song is a mid-tempo house number with Latin and R&B influences.

"Droppin' Like Flies" was a top 25 Dance hit, peaking at #23 on the U.S. Dance charts. It debuted and peaked at #77 on the R&B charts.

== Music video ==
The elaborate music video featured Sheila E. and many people in a crime-ridden urban area, and featured police firing their guns, thugs fighting, and people walking out of shady clubs.

== Chart positions ==
Chart (1991)	Peak position
U.S. Billboard Hot R&B Singles	77
U.S. Billboard Hot Dance Club Play	23
U.S. Billboard Hot Dance Music/Maxi-Single Sales	15

== Formats and track listings ==
U.S. cassette maxi single

1. "Droppin' Like Flies" (Black Flag Club Mix) – 7:08
2. "Droppin' Like Flies" (Venus Fly Dub) – 5:12
3. "Droppin' Like Flies" (Combat Bonus Beats) – 3:37
4. "Droppin' Like Flies" (Mental Club Mix) – 5:52)
5. "Droppin' Like Flies" (instrumental mix) – 6:48

U.S. 12" promo

1. "Droppin' Like Flies" (Mental Club Mix) – 5:52
2. "Droppin' Like Flies" (The Black Flag Club Mix) – 7:05
3. "Droppin' Like Flies" (album version) – 5:27

U.S. CD promo

1. "Droppin' Like Flies" (radio edit) – 4:10
2. "Droppin' Like Flies" (radio mix) – 3:38
3. "Droppin' Like Flies" (The Black Flag Club Mix) – 7:05
