= A Love Bizarre =

1985 single by Sheila E.

Single by Sheila E.

from the album Romance 1600
- B-side: "A Love Bizarre (part II)"; "Save the People"
- Released: November 1985
- Recorded: January 18, 1985 (tracking); January 20, 1985 (overdubs)
- Studio: Cheshire Sound (Atlanta, Georgia) (tracking); 5th Floor (Cincinnati, Ohio) (overdubs)
- Length: 12:18 (album version); 3:46 (single version)
- Label: Warner Bros.
- Songwriters: Prince; Sheila E.
- Producers: Prince; Sheila E.

Sheila E. singles chronology
"Sister Fate" (1985)	"A Love Bizarre" (1985)	"Holly Rock" (1986)

Audio
- "A Love Bizarre" (album version) on YouTube

Performance video
- "A Love Bizarre" at Countdown, 1986 on YouTube

"A Love Bizarre" is a song by American singer-songwriter Sheila E., written by Prince and Sheila E. The song is a duet between both singers and appears on Sheila E.'s 1985 album Romance 1600. Its album version clocks in at 12:16, but the single version is 3:46 in duration. It made its debut in the music film Krush Groove.

The song was a hit, topping the US Billboard Dance/Disco Club Play chart, number two on the Billboard Hot Black Singles chart, and number 11 on the Billboard Hot 100. It was a European hit as well, entering the top 10 in Belgium, the Netherlands, and West Germany. The German 12-inch single release is backed by the B-side "Save the People" which also served as the B-side for her previous single "Sister Fate". She performed the song as part of Ringo Starr & His All-Starr Band during their 2001, 2003 and 2006 tours.

== Music video ==
The club scene from Krush Groove in which Sheila E. and her band are performing the song was used for the majority of the music video with a few scenes from the film edited in. The music video uses the song's single edit.

== Formats and track listings ==
US 7-inch

1. "A Love Bizarre" – 3:46
2. "A Love Bizarre (part II)" – 3:50

German 12-inch

1. "A Love Bizarre (parts I and II)" – 7:36
2. "Save the People" – 8:28

== Personnel ==
Personnel are adapted from Duane Tudahl and Benoît Clerc.

- Sheila E. – lead & backing vocals, percussion
- Prince – lead and backing vocals, keyboards, Yamaha DX7, electric guitars, bass guitar, Linn LM-1
- Eddie M. – saxophone, backing vocals
- Juan Escovedo – percussion
- Steph Birnbaum, Susie Davis, & Jerome Benton – backing vocals

== Charts ==
=== Weekly charts ===
Weekly chart performance for "A Love Bizarre"
Chart (1985–1986)	Peak position
Austria (Ö3 Austria Top 40)	14
Belgium (Ultratop 50 Flanders)	9
Netherlands (Dutch Top 40)	7
Netherlands (Single Top 100)	9
Switzerland (Schweizer Hitparade)	16
UK Singles (Official Charts)	76
US Billboard Hot 100	11
US Dance/Disco Club Play (Billboard)	1
US Hot Black Singles (Billboard)	2
West Germany (GfK)	4

=== Year-end charts ===
Year-end chart performance for "A Love Bizarre"
Chart (1986)	Rank
Belgium (Ultratop)	65
Netherlands (Dutch Top 40)	38
Netherlands (Single Top 100)	36
US Billboard Hot 100	83
US Dance/Disco Club Play (Billboard)	41
US Hot Black Singles (Billboard)	38
West Germany (Media Control)	21

== See also ==
- List of number-one dance hits (United States)
