= Romance 1600 =

Studio album by Sheila E.
- Released: August 26, 1985
- Recorded: January 4 – February 8, 1985
- Genre: Funk, pop, R&B
- Length: 38:59
- Label: Paisley Park, Warner Bros.
- Producer: Sheila E.; Prince

Sheila E. chronology
The Glamorous Life (1984)	Romance 1600 (1985)	Sheila E. (1987)

Singles from Romance 1600
- 1. "Sister Fate" Released: July 26, 1985; 2. "Bedtime Story" Released: August 12, 1985; 3. "A Love Bizarre" Released: October 1985

Romance 1600 is the second album by the American singer and musician Sheila E. It was released on August 26, 1985, by Warner Bros. Records and Paisley Park Records. The album was recorded from January 1985 to February 1985, and was produced by Sheila E. herself, alongside Prince.

== Recording and production ==
The recording of the album took place over a monthly period. The album was recorded in various locations including Cheshire Sound Studios, Master Sound Studios in Atlanta, Georgia; Sunset Sound Recorders in Hollywood, California; Le Mobile in Houston, Texas; and 5th Floor Recording Studio in Cincinnati, Ohio. Sheila wrote two songs "Merci for The Speed of a Mad Clown in Summer" and "A Love Bizarre"; the latter of which was co-written with Prince. Prince wrote and produced the remaining songs on the album.

== Release and promotion ==
They thought the whole thing about the first album was to sell sex, which was how it was presented. But for the second album, I cut my hair and wore a long-sleeved blouse and long pants, because I wanted to be seen as a strong musician. But no one got it.

— Sheila E. Prince and the Parade and Sign O' The Times Era Studio Sessions in 2021

After American singer and musician Prince founded his own record label Paisley Park Records in 1985, Sheila E. became one of the first artists to sign to the label. In collaboration with Warner Bros. Records, Paisley Park Records released Romance 1600 on August 26, 1985. On October 12, 1985, she performed "Sister Fate", "A Love Bizarre", and "Holly Rock" on musical variety television show Soul Train. She also performed "A Love Bizarre" on Dutch music television program Countdown in 1986.

To further promote the album, Sheila appeared as the female lead in the musical comedy-drama film Krush Groove, released by Warner Bros. Pictures on October 25, 1985. She performed two songs in the film, "A Love Bizarre" and "Holly Rock"; a single released on the film's soundtrack. On June 16, 1986, a concert film titled Live Romance 1600 was released by Warner Reprise Video. The concert was filmed at the Warfield Theatre in San Francisco, California, and featured a special appearance by Prince and the Revolution.

=== Singles ===
"Sister Fate" was released as the album's lead single on July 26, 1985. The song failed crossover to the pop chart, only making an impact on the Hot Black Singles chart at number 36. The accompanying music was directed by Prince.

"Bedtime Story" was released as the second single on August 12, 1985. Like its predecessor, the song was only released in the United States, however it did not make the charts.

"A Love Bizarre" was released the final single in October 1985. The song became an immediate success, peaking at number 11 on the US Billboard Hot 100 chart and topping the US Hot Dance Club Play chart; her second song behind "The Glamorous Life" (1984) to achieve this. The song also peaked at number 3 on the Hot Black Singles chart. Internationally, "A Love Bizarre" reached the top-twenty in Austria, and several European countries. The accompanying music video was directed by Michael Schultz.

== Critical reception ==
Professional ratings
Review scores
Source	Rating
AllMusic	4/5 stars
Robert Christgau	B
Rolling Stone	4/5 stars

Romance 1600 received mixed reviews from music critics. Alex Henderson of AllMusic noted "Although Escovedo did most of the writing and producing herself, Prince's influence is strong throughout the album." The Ottawa Citizen praised Sheila E. as the "most promising Prince spinoff". According to the 2021 publication Prince and the Parade and Sign O' The Times Era Studio Sessions, People magazine gave the album a harsh review, referring to the album's lyrics as "foolishness" and "cornball".

== Commercial performance ==
Romance 1600 debuted at number 79 on the US Billboard 200 on September 21, 1985. On March 8, 1986, the album peaked at number 50 on the chart. During its final week, it fell to number 179 on May 3, 1986, before dropping off the chart after a total of thirty-three weeks. Romance 1600 peaked at number 12 on the US Top Black Albums chart. Internationally, Romance 1600 peaked at in the top forty in Germany, the Netherlands, and Sweden. Romance 1600 was certified gold by the Recording Industry Association of America (RIAA) on January 28, 1986.

== Track listing ==
All tracks are written by Prince, except where noted

Side one
No.	Title	Writer(s)	Length
1.	"Sister Fate"		3:50
2.	"Dear Michaelangelo"		4:38
3.	"A Love Bizarre"	Prince, Sheila E.	12:18

Side two
No.	Title	Writer(s)	Length
4.	"Toy Box"		5:32
5.	"Yellow"		2:11
6.	"Romance 1600"		3:56
7.	"Merci for the Speed of a Mad Clown in Summer"	Sheila E.	2:47
8.	"Bedtime Story"		3:45

== Personnel ==
- Sheila E. – lead and backing vocals, percussion (all but 4), drums (1, 5, 7), Simmons SDSV (1), strings, arranger, producer, writer
- Juan Escovedo – percussion (3)
- Eddie M. – backing vocals (3, 4); saxophone (all but 5)
- Ken Grey – Yamaha DX7 (1)
- Stef Burns (Stephan Birnbaum) (It) – electric guitar (1), 12-string acoustic guitar (8), backing vocals (3, 4)
- Prince – lead (3, 5) and backing vocals (1–3), electric guitar (2–4), Yamaha DX7 (all but 7), Oberheim OB-SX (2), Hammond organ (1, 4, 7), piano (1, 8), keyboards (3, 6), bass guitar (1, 3–5, 8), Linn LM-1 (1, 2, 5, 6), LinnDrum (3, 4), percussion (4), drums (8)
- Micheal Weaver – backing vocals (4)
- Susie Davis – backing vocals (2, 3, 6)
- Jerome Benton – backing vocals (3)
- Benny Rietveld – backing vocals (6), bass guitar (1, 7)
- John Liotine – trumpet (5)
- Steve Madaio – trumpet (5)
- Ron Jannelli – trumpet (5), trombone (5)
- Dick Hyde – trombone (5)
- Robert Martin – saxophone (5)
- Tim Misica – saxophone (5)

== Charts ==
=== Weekly charts ===
Weekly chart performance for Romance 1600
Chart (1985)	Peak position
Dutch Albums (Album Top 100)	33
German Albums (Offizielle Top 100)	36
Swedish Albums (Sverigetopplistan)	33
US Billboard 200	50
US Top R&B/Hip-Hop Albums (Billboard)	12

=== Year-end charts ===
Year-end chart performance for Romance 1600
Chart (1986)	Position
US Top R&B/Hip-Hop Albums (Billboard)	40

== Certifications ==
Certifications for Romance 1600
Region	Certification	Certified units/sales
United States (RIAA)	Gold	500,000^{^}
^{^} Shipments figures based on certification alone.
