= The Glamorous Life (album) =

1984 studio album by Sheila E

Studio album by Sheila E.
- Released: June 4, 1984
- Recorded: December 1983 – April 1984
- Studio: Sunset Sound (Los Angeles)
- Genre: Funk, pop, soul, rock
- Length: 33:09 (LP); 39:42 (CD)
- Label: Warner Bros.
- Producer: The Starr ★ Company, Sheila E.

Sheila E. chronology
The Glamorous Life (1984)	Romance 1600 (1985)

Singles from The Glamorous Life
- 1. "The Glamorous Life" Released: May 2, 1984; 2. "The Belle of St. Mark" Released: October 12, 1984; 3. "Noon Rendezvous" Released: February 1985

Sheila E. in The Glamorous Life (also referred to as The Glamorous Life) is the debut solo album by American singer and musician Sheila E.. It was released on June 4, 1984, by Warner Bros. Records. The album was recorded in less than four months, from December 1983 to April 1984, and was produced by The Starr ★ Company, a pseudonym used by American singer and musician Prince. The album features background vocals from Prince and American singers Brenda Bennett and Jill Jones.

Upon its release, The Glamorous Life received positive reviews from music critics and was a commercial success, with the album debuting at number 174 on the US Billboard 200, later peaking number 28. The album earned four nominations at the 27th Annual Grammy Awards including Best New Artist, Best R&B Instrumental Performance for "Shortberry Strawcake", and Best Female Pop Vocal Performance as well as Best R&B Song for "The Glamorous Life". The Glamorous Life has been certified gold by the Recording Industry Association of America (RIAA).

Three singles were produced—"The Glamorous Life", "The Belle of St. Mark", and "Noon Rendezvous". "The Glamorous Life" became her first top-ten US Billboard Hot 100 song while "The Belle of St. Mark" became a top-ten European song. Sheila E. promoted the album via numerous live performances and two concert tours—Purple Rain Tour (1984) and The Glamorous Life Tour (1984-1985).

== Background and development ==
After completing Marvin Gaye's Sexual Healing Tour in 1983 as one of his percussionists, Sheila Escovedo signed to Warner Bros. Records at the insistence of American singer and musician Prince, whom she had met backstage at a concert in San Francisco. Sheila and Prince began recording songs together as early as the late 1970s. In an interview with music magazine Billboard, Sheila stated, "We were in the studio every single day, just hanging out and playing, and he was writing music for other people and I'd help him. The Glamorous Life was done in a week — we’d stay up until five and six in the morning recording, go home for a couple of hours, come back and start playing again. Next thing you know, seven days later, the record's done. That’s how to do a record." Although Escovedo claims that the album was recorded in a week, some publications claim that The Glamorous Life was recorded in four months with recording sessions starting in December 1983.

== Release and promotion ==
The Glamorous Life was internationally released by Warner Bros. Records on June 4, 1984. To promote The Glamorous Life, Sheila E. appeared on various television and award shows from mid-1984 until mid-1985. She performed the album's lead single "The Glamorous Life" on West German music television programme Musikladen on July 18, 1984. She performed "The Glamorous Life" and "The Belle of St. Mark" on Dutch music television program Countdown on October 21, 1984. On November 3, 1984, she performed "The Belle of St. Mark" on Dutch music television program TopPop. She performed "The Glamorous Life" at the 12th Annual American Music Awards at the Shrine Auditorium in Los Angeles on January 28, 1985.

=== Singles ===
"The Glamorous Life" was released as the lead single from Sheila E. in The Glamorous Life on May 2, 1984, to positive reviews. A commercial success, it peaked at number 7 on the US Billboard Hot 100 and atop US Hot Dance Club Play chart. Internationally, it peaked in the top-ten on the Dutch Single Top 100, and number 11 in Australia. The accompanying music video for "The Glamorous Life" was directed by Mary Lambert. The music video was eventually uploaded to Rhino Records' YouTube channel on February 19, 2021.

"The Belle of St. Mark" was released as the second single from the album in October 1984. In the United States, "The Belle of St. Mark" did not meet the same success as its predecessor but the song peaked within the top forty on the Billboard Hot 100. Internationally, the song was a commercial success, peaking in the top-twenty in several European countries including Belgium, New Zealand, and the United Kingdom. The accompanying music video was eventually uploaded to Rhino Records' YouTube channel on February 19, 2021.

Although "Noon Rendezvous" was released as the final single from the album in February 1985, the song did not make any charts.

=== Tours ===
In September 1984, Sheila E. embarked on The Glamorous Life Tour. The concert tour played in four countries-United States, France, Sweden, and the Netherlands. While in the Netherlands, her October 12th concert performance at Maaspoort in Den Bosch was recorded and aired on AVROTROS. In November 1984, she joined the Purple Rain Tour as the opening act. After performing her opening set, Prince would often invite her to perform alongside him during his set. After the tour concluded, Sheila revived The Glamorous Life Tour for its final leg in Japan.

== Commercial performance ==
The Glamorous Life debuted at number 174 on the US Billboard 200 on July 7, 1984. On October 6, 1984, the album peaked at number 28 on the chart and held the position for two weeks. By May 18, 1985, The Glamorous Life fell to number 157 and dropped off after forty-six weeks on the chart. The album peaked at number 7 on the Top Black Albums chart on September 29, 1984. On January 10, 1985, The Glamorous Life was certified gold by the Recording Industry Association of America (RIAA).

== Critical reception ==
Professional ratings
Review scores
Source	Rating
AllMusic	4.5/5 stars
Robert Christgau	B+
The Rolling Stone Album Guide	3/5 stars

Music critic Alex Henderson of AllMusic gave the album a 4.5 star rating. Although Henderson criticized Escovedo's vocal ability, he also stated, "As a drummer/percussionist, Escovedo has major chops -- and even though she doesn't have a mind-blowing vocal range, she has no problem getting her points across on her debut solo album, The Glamorous Life." A music critic for The Crisis magazine wrote, "The major problem I have with the album, is that most of the vocal tracks are pushed so far back, and mixed so much reverb, that it's hard to hear and/or understand what Sheila Escovedo the writer and/or vocalist has to say to the world."

== Accolades ==
The Glamorous Life and its singles earned Sheila E. numerous awards and nominations. She earned four nominations at the 27th Annual Grammy Awards including Best New Artist, Best R&B Instrumental Performance for "Shortberry Strawcake", Best Female Pop Vocal Performance, and Best R&B Song for "The Glamorous Life". At the 12th Annual American Music Awards in 1985, she was nominated for Favorite Soul/R&B Female Artist and Favorite Soul/R&B Female Video Artist. "The Glamorous Life" was nominated for Best Female Video, Best New Artist in a Video, and Best Choreography at the 1985 MTV Video Music Awards. The song also became NME's "Single of the Week".

== Track listing ==
All tracks are written by Prince, except where noted.

Side one
No.	Title	Writer(s)	Length
1.	"The Belle of St. Mark"	Prince, Jesse Johnson, Sheila E.	5:08
2.	"Shortberry Strawcake"		4:44
3.	"Noon Rendezvous"	Prince, Sheila E.	3:50

Side two
No.	Title	Length
4.	"Oliver's House"	6:20
5.	"Next Time Wipe the Lipstick Off Your Collar"	3:50
6.	"The Glamorous Life"	9:00

CD only
No.	Title	Length
7.	"The Glamorous Life" (club edit)	6:33

== Personnel ==
- Sheila E. – lead and backing vocals, percussion, director
- David Coleman – cello (4, 6)
- Nick DeCaro – accordion (5)
- Jill Jones aka J.J. – backing vocals (1, 4, 6)
- Brenda Bennett – backing vocals (5)
- Novi Novog – violin (5)
- Larry Williams – alto saxophone (6)
- Prince (uncredited) – backing vocals, Oberheim OB-8, Yamaha DX7, piano, guitars, bass guitar, Linn LM-1

=== Production ===
- Produced by The Starr Company but credited to Sheila E. and The Starr Company
- Terry Christian, Peggy Mac – mixing
- Bernie Grundman – mastering

== Charts ==
Chart performance for The Glamorous Life
Chart (1984)	Peak position
Australian Albums (Kent Music Report)	66
Dutch Albums (Album Top 100)	12
New Zealand Albums (RMNZ)	43
Swedish Albums (Sverigetopplistan)	46
US Billboard 200	28
US Top R&B/Hip-Hop Albums (Billboard)	7

== Certifications ==
Certifications for The Glamorous Life
Region	Certification	Certified units/sales
United States (RIAA)	Gold	500,000^{^}
^{^} Shipments figures based on certification alone.
