= The Belle of St. Mark =

1984 single by Sheila E.

- US 7-inch single

Single by Sheila E.

from the album The Glamorous Life
- B-side: "Too Sexy"
- Released: October 12, 1984
- Recorded: c. February 10, 1984 (instruments); April 1–4, 1984 (Sheila E's vocals)
- Studio: Sunset Sound Recorders (Hollywood, California)
- Length: 5:12 (album version); 3:38 (7-inch version); 7:43 (12-inch version)
- Label: Warner Bros.
- Songwriters: Prince; Jesse Johnson; Sheila E.
- Producers: Sheila E.; Prince (as The Starr ★ Company)

Sheila E. singles chronology
"The Glamorous Life" (1984)	"The Belle of St. Mark" (1984)	"Noon Rendezvous" (1985)

Alternative cover
- Artwork used for the German, UK, and Dutch releases

"The Belle of St. Mark" is a song by singer-songwriter Sheila E. The song was released in October 1984 in the United States. and peaked at No. 34 on the US Billboard Hot 100 chart, as well as No. 68 on the Billboard Hot Black Singles chart. Worldwide, it reached the top 10 in Belgium, the Netherlands, and New Zealand as well as the top 20 in Australia, the United Kingdom, and Ireland.

NME named the song the "Single of the Week" on February 2, 1985. Jerry Smith of Music Week called the song a "rather subdued, funky track with a smooth Starr Company production".

== Background ==
The song's lyrics tell of an androgynous "frail but passionate creature", referred to as "he" throughout, but called the feminine "Belle". The song implies the Belle is French (viz. the lyrics, "His Paris hair, it blows in the warm Parisian air / That blows whenever his Paris hair is there") but St. Mark is commonly known as a location in Venice, Italy. The writer of the song, Prince lived near St. Mark's Episcopal Cathedral (Minneapolis) and grew fond of their bells, which are featured in the beginning of the song.

== Track listings ==
7-inch vinyl

A. "The Belle of St. Mark" – 3:38
B. "Too Sexy" – 5:03

12-inch vinyl

A. "The Belle of St. Mark" (dance remix) – 7:43
B. "Too Sexy" – 5:05

== Personnel ==
Personnel are sourced from Duane Tudahl.

- Sheila E. – lead and backing vocals, sleigh bells, bongos
- Prince – Oberheim OB-8, Yamaha DX7, Linn LM-1
- Jill Jones – backing vocals

== Charts ==
=== Weekly charts ===
Weekly chart performance for "The Belle of St. Mark"
Chart (1984–1985)	Peak position
Australia (Kent Music Report)	16
Belgium (Ultratop 50 Flanders)	5
Canada Top Singles (RPM)	65
Ireland (IRMA)	18
Netherlands (Dutch Top 40)	5
Netherlands (Single Top 100)	8
New Zealand (Recorded Music NZ)	5
UK Singles (Official Charts)	18
US Billboard Hot 100	34
US Hot Black Singles (Billboard)	68

=== Year-end charts ===
1984 year-end chart performance for "The Belle of St. Mark"
Chart (1984)	Position
Belgium (Ultratop)	76
Netherlands (Dutch Top 40)	33
Netherlands (Single Top 100)	45

1985 year-end chart performance for "The Belle of St. Mark"
Chart (1985)	Position
Australia (Kent Music Report)	90
