= Peter Michael Escovedo =

American musician (born 1961)

- Also known as: Peter Michael Escovedo III
- Born: July 7, 1961 (age 65); Alameda County, California, U.S.
- Occupations: Musical director, percussionist
- Instrument: Percussion
- Website: peteescovedo.com/escovedo-family/peter-michael

Peter Michael Escovedo III (born July 7, 1961) is an American percussionist and musical director.

== Early life ==
Escovedo was born in Alameda County, California, and is a member of a musical family, the son and namesake of percussionist Pete Escovedo. His siblings are percussionists Juan Escovedo, Sheila E. (Escovedo), and Zina Escovedo. His uncle is percussionist Coke Escovedo and his cousin is drummer René Escovedo. He is the biological father of Nicole Richie.

== Career ==
Escovedo has worked as a musical director for television programs including the Wayne Brady Show and Martin Short Show and performers including Mos Def, Barry Manilow, Stevie Nicks, Justin Timberlake and Luther Vandross. He has toured with headliners including Mariah Carey, Lionel Richie, Sheena Easton and Tina Turner and has recorded with artists such as Barbra Streisand, Patti LaBelle and Kenny G.

In 2014, Peter Escovedo was invited along with his father Pete and his brother Juan, by producer Gerry Gallagher to record with Latin rock legends El Chicano as well as Alphonse Mouzon, Brian Auger, Alex Ligertwood, Siedah Garrett, Walfredo Reyes Jr., Ray Parker Jr., Vikki Carr, Marcos J. Reyes, Lenny Castro, Salvador Santana, and David Paich and is featured on percussion on a remake of a song co-written by Willie Bobo called Sixty Two Fifty, which is featured on Gallagher's most recent studio album due out in 2019.

== Personal life ==
Escovedo is the biological father of television personality Nicole Richie. As he could not afford to provide for her financially at that time, he let her move in with Lionel Richie and Brenda Harvey at the age of three. In 2003, Nicole told People "My parents were friends with Lionel," and "They trusted that they would be better able to provide for me."
