= Hold Me (Sheila E. song) =

Single by Sheila E.

from the album Sheila E.
- B-side: "The World Is High"
- Released: January 1987
- Genre: R&B
- Length: 5:04 (album/extended version); 4:10 (single version)
- Label: Warner Bros.
- Songwriter(s): Constance Guzman, Eddie Minnifield, Sheila E.
- Producer(s): Sheila E., David Z

Sheila E. singles chronology
"Holly Rock" (1986)	"Hold Me" (1987)	"Koo Koo" (1987)

"Hold Me" is a 1987 song by Sheila E., and the first single released from her third album, Sheila E.. The song is an R&B ballad and the B-side is the non-album track "The World Is High".

== Chart positions ==
was an R&B hit, peaking at No. 3 on the U.S. R&B singles chart. On the Billboard Hot 100, it reached No. 68.

Chart (1987)	Peak position
U.S. Billboard Hot 100	68
U.S. Billboard Hot Black Singles	3
U.S. Billboard Hot Dance Music/Maxi-Singles Sales	22

== Formats and track listings ==
U.S. 7"

1. "Hold Me" (edit) – 4:10
2. "The World Is High" – 3:25

U.S. 12"

1. "Hold Me" (album) – 5:04
2. "The World Is High" – 3:25
