= Sex Cymbal =

Studio album by Sheila E.
- Released: April 1991
- Recorded: 1990–1991
- Genres: R&B; dance; pop
- Length: 59:49
- Label: Warner Bros.
- Producers: Sheila E.; Peter Michael; David Gamson

Sheila E. chronology
Sheila E. (1987)	Sex Cymbal (1991)	Writes of Passage (2000)

Singles from Sex Cymbal
- 1. "Sex Cymbal" Released: April 1, 1991; 2. "Droppin' Like Flies" Released: May 17, 1991; 3. "Cry Baby" Released: August 22, 1991

Professional ratings
Review scores
Source	Rating
AllMusic	2.5/5 stars
Ebony	favorable
Entertainment Weekly	B+
People	mixed
Robert Christgau	(dud)

Sex Cymbal is the fourth solo album by American singer and drummer Sheila E., released in April 1991 by Warner Bros. Records, four years after her previous album. It is the first Sheila E. album that does not feature any input from Prince.

== History ==
In 1990 Sheila went into the studio to record the album with her brother Peter Michael. She and Michael produced the whole album together and a few songs feature co-production from David Gamson and J.P. Charles.

Sex Cymbal produced three singles, "Sex Cymbal", "Droppin' Like Flies", and "Cry Baby". The title track, which includes an intro with a brief sample of Sheila's 1984 single "The Glamorous Life", was released as the lead single, and it reached the top 40 of the US R&B and Dance charts. The second single, "Droppin' Like Flies", was a top 40 Dance hit but stalled at number 77 on the R&B charts. The third and final single from the album, "Cry Baby", failed to chart.

The album is a departure from her previous album Sheila E., which was notable for its Latin influence and mixing many styles of music such as jazz, rock, funk, R&B, and salsa.

== Track listing ==
Produced and arranged by Sheila E. and Peter Michael except where noted.

1. "Sex Cymbal" – 4:26
2. "Funky Attitude" – 5:11
3. "Leader of the Band" – 4:04
4. "Cry Baby" (Sheila E., J.P. Charles) – 5:44
5. "Lady Marmalade" (Bob Crewe, Kenny Nolan) – 5:04
6. "808 Kate (Drum Solo)" – 1:00
7. "Loverboy" – 4:03
8. "Mother Mary" – 5:23
9. "Droppin' Like Flies" (Peter Michael, David Gamson) – 5:26
10. "What'cha Gonna Do" – 4:40
11. "Private Party (Tu Para Mi)" – 4:39
12. "Family Affair (Percussion Jam)" – 1:00
13. "Promise Me Love" – 5:37
14. "Heaven" – 4:36

== Personnel ==
- Sheila E. – lead vocals, production
- Michael Peter – production
- J.P. Charles – co-production on "Cry Baby"
- David Gamson – co-production on "Droppin' Like Flies"

== Charts ==
Chart performance for Sex Cymbal
Chart (1991)	Peak position
Australian Albums (ARIA)	117
US Billboard 200	146
US Top R&B/Hip-Hop Albums (Billboard)	56
