= Sex Cymbal (song) =

Single by Sheila E.

from the album Sex Cymbal
- B-side: "Bass Base"
- Released: April 1, 1991
- Genre: R&B
- Length: 4:28 (album version); 3:40 (Single/radio remix); 6:35 (extended remix)
- Label: Warner Bros.
- Songwriters: Sheila E., Pete Escovedo, Cat Gray
- Producers: Sheila E., Peter Michael Escovedo

Sheila E. singles chronology
"Koo Koo" (1987)	"Sex Cymbal" (1991)	"Droppin' Like Flies" (1991)

"Sex Cymbal" is the lead single released from Sheila E.'s album of the same name. The song is a mid-tempo hip-hop/house number and features a rap verse from Sheila E. herself.

"Sex Cymbal" peaked at No. 32 on the U.S. R&B singles chart. It was the highest-charting single from the album. The B-side is the instrumental "Bass Base".

== Music video ==
The music video showcased Sheila E. and her dancers wearing various outfits, primary color backdrops, fashion and vogue posing and dancing.

== Charts ==
Peak position	Chart (1991)
88	Australia (ARIA Charts)
32	U.S. Billboard Hot R&B Singles
30	U.S. Billboard Hot Dance Music/Maxi-Singles Sales

== Formats and track listings ==
U.S. promo maxi CD single

1. "Sex Cymbal" (radio remix) – 3:40
2. "Sex Cymbal" (12" extended remix) – 6:35
3. "Sex Cymbal" (radio edit) – 3:27
4. "Sex Cymbal" (album version) – 4:28

U.S. 12", U.S. maxi CD single

1. "Sex Cymbal" (12" mix) – 5:12
2. "Sex Cymbal" (Jungle Groove Mix) – 2:40
3. "Sex Cymbal" (4 on the Floor Mix) – 5:19
4. "Bass Base" – 4:37
