= Sheila E. =

American percussionist and singer (born 1957)

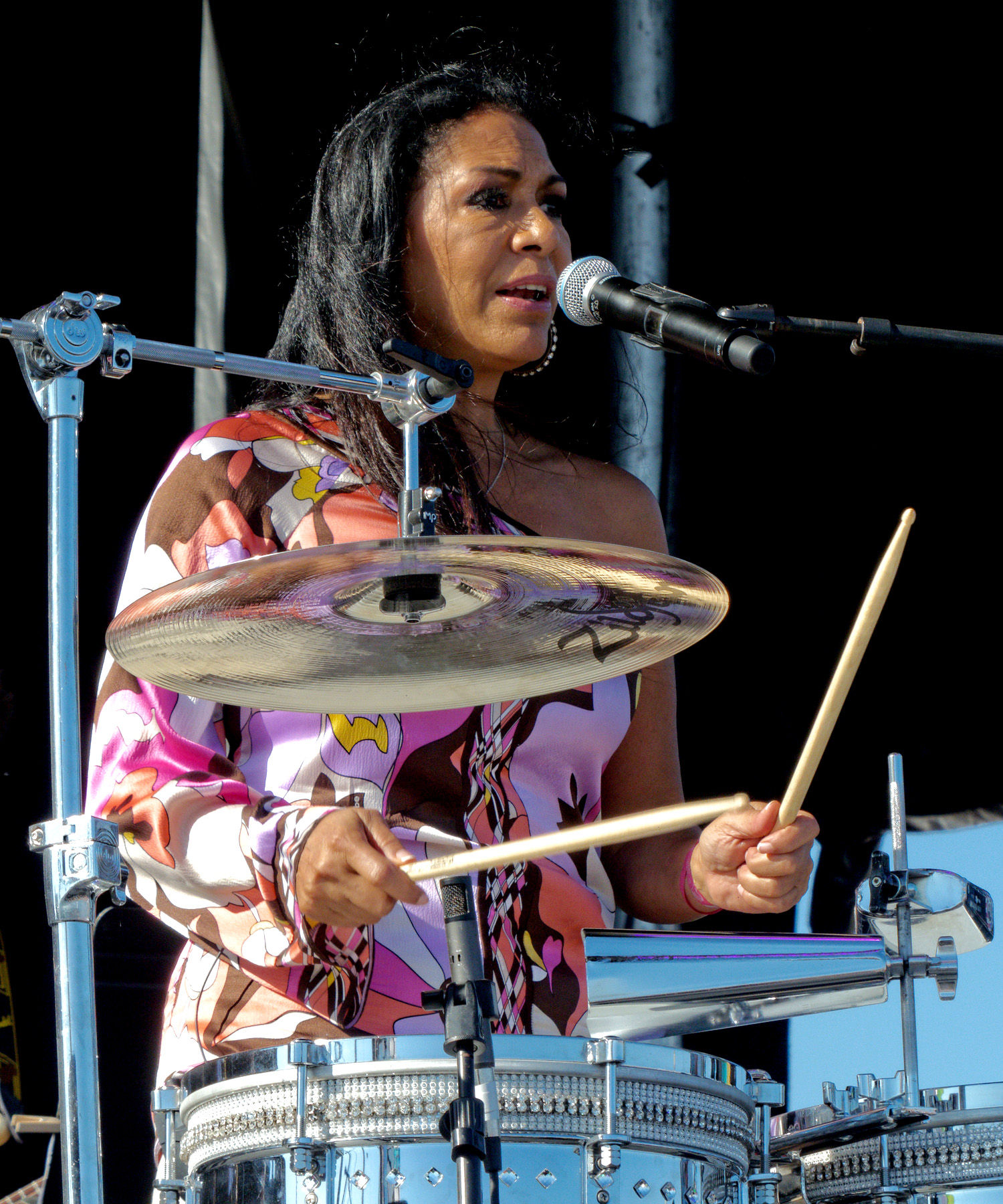
- Escovedo performing in 2014
- Born: Sheila Cecilia Escovedo; December 12, 1957 (age 68); Oakland, California, U.S.
- Occupations: Musician; singer; songwriter; record producer
- Years active: 1976–present
- Father: Pete Escovedo
- Relatives: Peter Michael Escovedo (brother); Coke Escovedo (uncle); Alejandro Escovedo (uncle); Nicole Richie (niece)
- Musical career
- Genres: Pop; Latin; funk; R&B
- Instruments: Percussion; drums; vocals
- Labels: Stiletto Flats Music; Warner Bros.; Paisley Park; Concord
- Website: sheilae.com

Sheila Cecilia Escovedo (born December 12, 1957), known under the stage name Sheila E., is an American percussionist, singer, songwriter, and actress. Regarded as one of the greatest percussionists of her generation, she is a multi-instrumentalist known for playing drums and percussion. She is sometimes referred to as the "Queen of Percussion". Her music incorporates a wide variety of styles, including R&B, funk, jazz, pop, synth-pop, latin pop, and salsa.

Born and raised in Oakland, California, Sheila began her music career as a percussionist for the George Duke Band from 1976 to 1980. She rose to mainstream success with release of her debut album, The Glamorous Life (1984), on Warner Bros. Records. The album's singles "The Glamorous Life" and "The Belle of St. Mark" became international hits. The album earned four Grammy Award nominations, including one for Best New Artist. Her follow-up album Romance 1600 (1985) produced another top-charting international hit called "A Love Bizarre". She released two more albums on Warner Bros. Records: Sheila E. (1987) and Sex Cymbal (1991).

In 2021, she received a Latin Grammy Lifetime Achievement Award. In July 2023, she received a star on the Hollywood Walk of Fame. In April 2024, she released her tenth album, Bailar. The album's single "Bemba Colorá" won a Grammy Award for Best Global Music Performance at 67th Annual Grammy Awards.

== Early life and family ==
Born in Oakland, California, Sheila E. is the daughter of Juanita Gardere, a dairy factory worker, and percussionist Pete Escovedo, with whom she frequently performed. Her mother is of Creole-French/African descent, and her father is of Mexican-American origin. She was raised Catholic. Pete Escovedo and his brother Coke were born in Los Angeles; their father, Pedro Escovedo, had immigrated from Mexico at age 12. Sheila E's uncles include Javier Escovedo, founder of the San Diego–punk act the Zeros; Alejandro Escovedo, founder of the San Francisco–based punk band the Nuns; Mario Escovedo, who fronted the long-running indie rockers the Dragons; and Coke Escovedo, who was in Santana and formed the band Azteca. Nicole Richie is Sheila E.'s niece, the daughter of Sheila's musician brother, Peter Michael Escovedo. Tito Puente was Sheila E's godfather.

She grew up in Oakland, where she studied violin in elementary and middle school; she left Oakland High School in 10th grade to perform with Azteca.

She has publicly stated that, at the age of five, she was raped by her teenaged babysitter, and this event had a profound influence on her childhood development.

== Career ==
=== 1976–1983: Beginnings ===
In 1976, Escovedo debuted on jazz bassist Alphonso Johnson's Yesterday's Dream. In 1977, she and her father Pete Escovedo released an album called Solo Two, credited to Pete and Sheila Escovedo. In the same year, she joined the George Duke Band as their percussionist. Escovedo appeared on Duke's albums, including Don't Let Go (1978), Follow the Rainbow (1979), Master of the Game (1979), and A Brazilian Love Affair (1980). In 1978, Escovedo and her father released their second album, Happy Together, on Fantasy Records. In 1979, she contributed percussion to Michael Jackson's song "Don't Stop 'Til You Get Enough". In 1980, she appeared on Herbie Hancock's album Monster. In 1983, she joined Marvin Gaye's final tour, the Sexual Healing Tour, as one of his percussionists.

=== 1984–1992: The Glamorous Life and career breakthrough ===
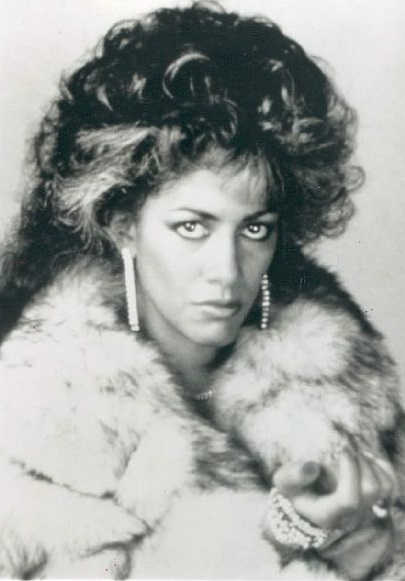
E. in 1985

In early 1984, Escovedo signed a record deal with Warner Bros. Records and adopted the stage name Sheila E. She began recording her first solo album with singer and musician Prince, whom she met at a concert when she was performing with her father in 1977. On June 4, 1984, she released her debut solo album, The Glamorous Life. The album peaked at number 28 on the U.S. Billboard 200 and sold over 500,000 copies in the United States, becoming certified gold by the Recording Industry Association of America (RIAA). The album's lead single, "The Glamorous Life", peaked in the top ten on the US Hot 100 and at number one on the US Dance chart. The album's second single, "The Belle of St. Mark", became a moderate hit, peaking at number 34 on the Hot 100. The song also became NME's "Single of the Week". The album earned four nominations at the 27th Annual Grammy Awards including Best New Artist, Best R&B Instrumental Performance for "Shortberry Strawcake", and Best Female Pop Vocal Performance as well as Best R&B Song for "The Glamorous Life". She also performed "Baby I'm a Star" with Prince during the ceremony. In July 1984, she appeared on Prince's song "Erotic City". In November 1984, Sheila began touring as the opening act of Purple Rain Tour. Shortly after the tour, she signed with Prince's record label Paisley Park Records.

In March 1985, she appeared on USA for Africa's song "We Are the World". Sheila released her second album, Romance 1600, on August 26, 1985. It sold over 500,000 copies in the United States, becoming certified gold by the Recording Industry Association of America (RIAA). The album's lead single, "Sister Fate", was released to moderate success, peaking in the top forty on the US R&B chart. The final single, "A Love Bizarre", was a commercial success, reaching number eleven in the United States. In November 1985, Sheila appeared as the female lead in the musical comedy-drama film Krush Groove, which spent its first weekend at number two on the U.S. box office and grossed $11 million. Sheila released "Holly Rock" as a single from its soundtrack album, which entered the top ten in Belgium and the Netherlands.

On February 24, 1987, Sheila released her eponymous third studio album. The album featured the single "Hold Me", an R&B ballad that peaked at number three on the R&B chart. The second single, "Koo Koo", peaked in the top forty of the R&B chart. In June 1987, Sheila served as the musical director for Prince's Sign o' the Times Tour. She also served as musical director during his Lovesexy Tour in 1988 and 1989. On April 10, 1991, she released her fourth album, Sex Cymbal. The album's lead single, "Sex Cymbal", became a moderate hit on the R&B chart, peaking at number thirty-two.

=== 1994–2005: Music production and directing ===
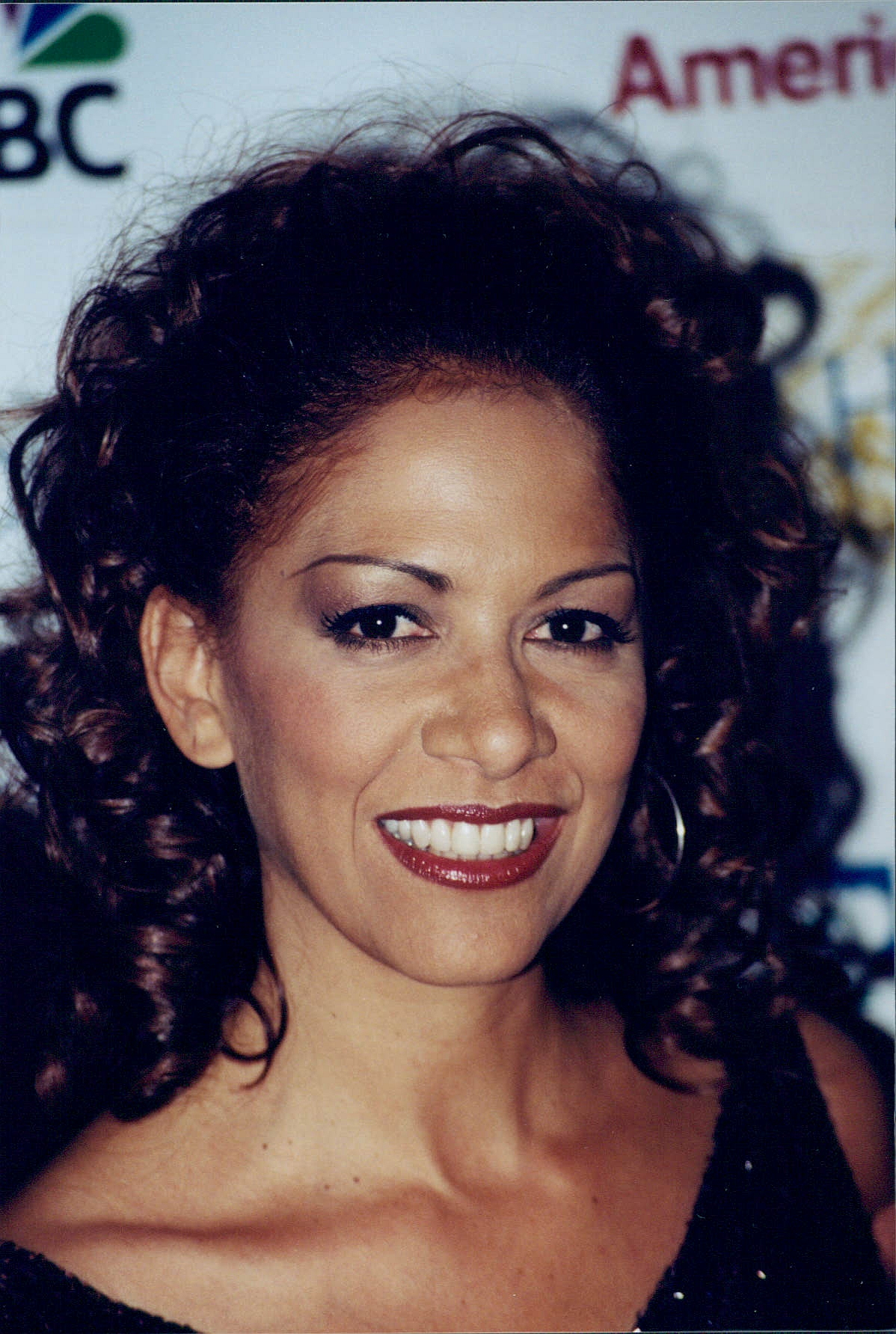
E. in 2000

In 1994, Sheila was a featured percussionist for Gloria Estefan's album Mi Tierra. In July 1996, Sheila appeared as a percussionist and background vocalist on Japanese singer Namie Amuro's album Sweet 19 Blues. She also toured as the drummer and background vocalist for Amuro's Sweet 19 Blues Tour. In 1998, she played percussion on the Phil Collins cover of "True Colors". In the same year, she became the music director for Magic Johnson's talk show, The Magic Hour, making her the first female musical director in television. She released her fifth album, Writes of Passage, on October 10, 2000. On August 28, 2001, she released her sixth album, Heaven.

In 2001, she joined Ringo Starr & His All-Starr Band and toured with the band in 2001, 2003, and 2006. In 2002, Sheila appeared on the Beyoncé song "Work It Out". In 2002, she reunited and performed with Prince during his One Nite Alone... Tour. In November 2003, she provided the musical arrangements for Cyndi Lauper's cover version of "Stay". In 2004, she joined Mexican-American musician Abraham Laboriel for his New Zealand tour as drummer and percussionist. In May 2004, she appeared on Tonex's song "Todos Juntos", which is featured on his Out the Box album. She appeared as the music director for Amerie's World Music Awards and The Lady Of Soul performances in 2005.

=== 2006–2012: C.O.E.D. and the E. Family ===
In February 2006, she performed with Prince at the BRIT Awards and on the Good Morning show in June 2006. She also performed at the Sonoma Jazz Festival in 2006 as part of Herbie Hancock's band. In the same year, Sheila formed her female band called C.O.E.D. (acronym for Chronicles of Every Diva). The band performed on several live televised shows and also recorded an album that was never released.

She performed at the 2007 Latin Grammy Awards with Juan Luis Guerra. In mid-2007, she toured with Prince. In October 2007, she appeared as a judge on Fox network's The Next Great American Band. On April 9, 2008, she appeared on the Emmy winning program Idol Gives Back. She took part in the show opener, "Get on Your Feet", with Gloria Estefan while the So You Think You Can Dance finalists dance troupe joined them on stage. On April 26, 2008, she performed with Prince at the Coachella Music Festival. From May 2 to 6, 2008, she played four sold-out shows at Blue Note Tokyo, the most frequented jazz music club in Tokyo, Japan. On June 14, 2008, Sheila E. performed at the Rhythm on the Vine Music and Wine Festival at the South Coast Winery in Temecula, California for Shriners Hospital for Children.

On May 30, 2009, Sheila E. and the E Family Band performed at Rhythm on the Vine at Gainey Vineyard in Santa Ynez, California for the Hot Latin Beats concert. Also performing at the concert was Poncho Sanchez. On December 13, 2009, Sheila E. performed at the Deryck Walcott produced Christmas Jazz held at the Plantation Restaurant in Barbados. In 2009, Sheila E. participated and won the CMT reality show, Gone Country. This gave her an opportunity to make country music aided by the country producer, writer, and singer John Rich. Sheila E.'s first song in the country market was "Glorious Train". A video for the song debuted on CMT on March 7, 2009, following the airing of the episode of Gone Country in which Sheila E. was announced the winner.

Sheila E. performed two shows at Yoshi's in Oakland, California, on August 15, 2010. At her merchandise stand, she sold an EP From E 2 U. She toured on Prince's 20Ten Tour and Welcome 2 America tours. In 2010, she joined forces with Avon as a celebrity judge for Avon Voices, Avon's first global, online singing talent search for women and songwriting competition for men and women.

On May 25, 2011, Sheila performed alongside Marc Anthony on the 10th-season finale of American Idol. On June 7, 2011, she performed on the Late Show with David Letterman as a part of the show's first "Drum Solo Week". In September 2011, the E. Family consisting of Pete Escovedo, Peter Michael Escovedo III, Juan Escovedo, and Sheila released an album, Now & Forever. The album spawned the singles "Do What It Do" and "I Like It". On February 26, 2012, Sheila performed at the 2012 Academy Awards alongside Pharrell Williams and Hans Zimmer, playing into and out of commercial segments. On April 17, 2012, Sheila was featured with "Macy's Stars of Dance" on the Dancing with the Stars results show. On June 16, Sheila headlined the 2012 Playboy Jazz Festival at the Hollywood Bowl in Los Angeles, California. Sheila joined Dave Koz on his 2012 Christmas Tour.

=== 2013–2022: Icon and Iconic: Message 4 America ===
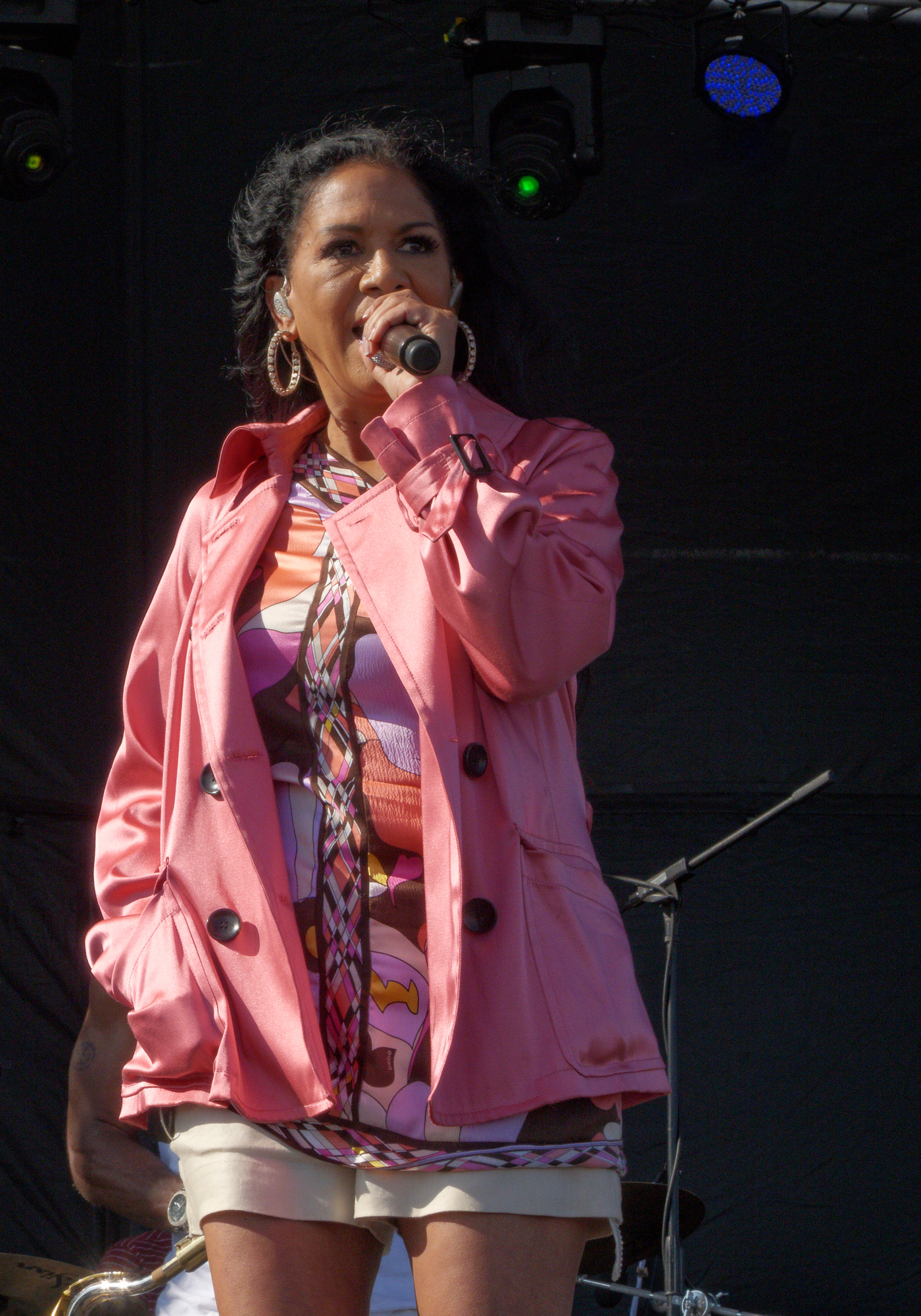
E. performing in 2014

In November 2013, she released her album Icon on her own recording label Stilettoflats Music. In September 2014, she released her autobiography Beat of My Own Drum. In 2016, Sheila provided drums for the orchestral soundtrack to the blockbuster superhero films Man of Steel and Batman v Superman: Dawn of Justice. On June 26, 2016, Sheila and the New Power Generation led a musical tribute to late singer Prince at the 2016 BET Awards. The next day, she released a single titled "Girl Meets Boy" in honor of Prince. In 2017, she was the featured percussionist for the soundtrack to the film The Boss Baby, which was also co-produced by Zimmer. She was featured in Fred Armisen's 2018 Netflix comedy special Stand Up for Drummers. Sheila played percussion on Gary Clark Jr.'s album This Land. She performed and served as music director for Let's Go Crazy: The Grammy Salute to Prince concert at the Staples Center on January 28, 2020.

On April 17, 2020, she released the single "Lemon Cake" which was available as an audio track on YouTube. On May 14, 2020, Sheila E. premiered the official video for "Lemon Cake" on Rated R&B. In July 2020, Sheila E. collaborated with MasterClass to create "Sheila E. Teaches Drumming and Percussion".

=== 2022–present: Bailar ===
In 2022, Sheila, along with her band the E-Train, released an album titled Hella Fonk E. The band also embarked on the Hella Fonk E Tour. In 2023, Sheila was featured on Kelly Clarkson's song "That's Right", which appears on her album Chemistry (2023). Sheila became the music director for the 2023 CBS bilingual, multicultural game show Lotería Loca. In April 2024, she released her tenth album, Bailar. The album earned a nomination at 67th Annual Grammy Awards for Best Tropical Latin Album and the album's single "Bemba Colorá" won the Grammy Award for Best Global Music Performance.In 2025, she appeared as a special guest in Christina Aguilera's concert film Christmas in Paris, performing the song "Little Drummer Girl".

== Artistry ==
=== Voice and musical style ===
Sheila's voice is classified as a contralto. She is also renowned as a multi-instrumentalist and is considered a percussion virtuoso. She has played percussion and drums on all her albums. Her music includes various styles of musical genres such as contemporary R&B, jazz, funk, pop, Latin pop, synthpop, and salsa.

=== Equipment ===
Signature and custom drums
- DW Sheila E. Icon Snare Drum
- LP Sheila E. Signature Timbale Set

Sheila E. is known for performing with a wide array of percussion instruments. She is proficient in playing congas, bongos, shakers, tambourines, and the shekere. Her signature instrument is a custom-made set of timbales equipped with two cowbells, referred to as LP Sheila E. Signature Timbale Set and paired with Zildjian cymbals. A later drum set she used was the DW Collector Series Custom. She is also proficient in playing the guitar, bass guitar, and keyboards.

== Legacy ==
Sheila has been referred to as the "Queen of Percussion" for having become one of the first female drummers and percussionist in mainstream pop music. Rolling Stone ranked Sheila at number 58 on its list of 100 Greatest Drummers of All Time in 2016.

She is known for her showmanship as a percussionist and drummer. Eventually in the 1980s, she came to be regarded as a sex symbol by the media for her innovative and revealing outfits. She later expressed her frustration for being viewed as a sexual image. Sheila told the Los Angeles Times, "No one knows me for what I do best. But people don't realize I can play drums—I mean really play." She wrote the song "Sex Cymbal" as response to the "sex symbol" imagery given by the media and released it as the lead single of her Sex Cymbal album in 1991.

== Personal life ==
=== Relationships ===
In 1975, Sheila dated musician Carlos Santana, whom she met during the time her father Pete Escovedo played percussion in the rock band Santana. Their relationship ended when she discovered that he was married to Deborah King.

In 1984, she was in a romantic relationship with Prince while he was still in a relationship with Susannah Melvoin. In late 1989, they became engaged during Prince's Lovesexy Tour.

=== Health ===
In late 1991, Sheila was hospitalized shortly after returning from her tour in Japan. She experienced a collapsed lung after a failed acupuncture treatment pierced her left lung. She also became semi-paralyzed due to her calf muscle becoming degraded due to wearing high heels while playing drums. She underwent a two-week treatment to rebuild her calf muscle and regain the ability to walk.

== Other activities ==
=== Business and ventures ===
In 2012, Sheila founded her own entertainment company Stiletto Flats Music Inc. The company began as a production unit for music. With headquarters in Los Angeles, the company serves as an umbrella for the entertainer's various brands in music, videos, and concert films. Stiletto Flats Music's first production was the concert film Sheila E. Summer Tour 2012: Raw And Real, Live In Lugano Switzerland (2012). The company has also distributed Sheila's albums: Icon (2013), Iconic: Message 4 America (2017), and Bailar (2024).

=== Philanthropy and activism ===
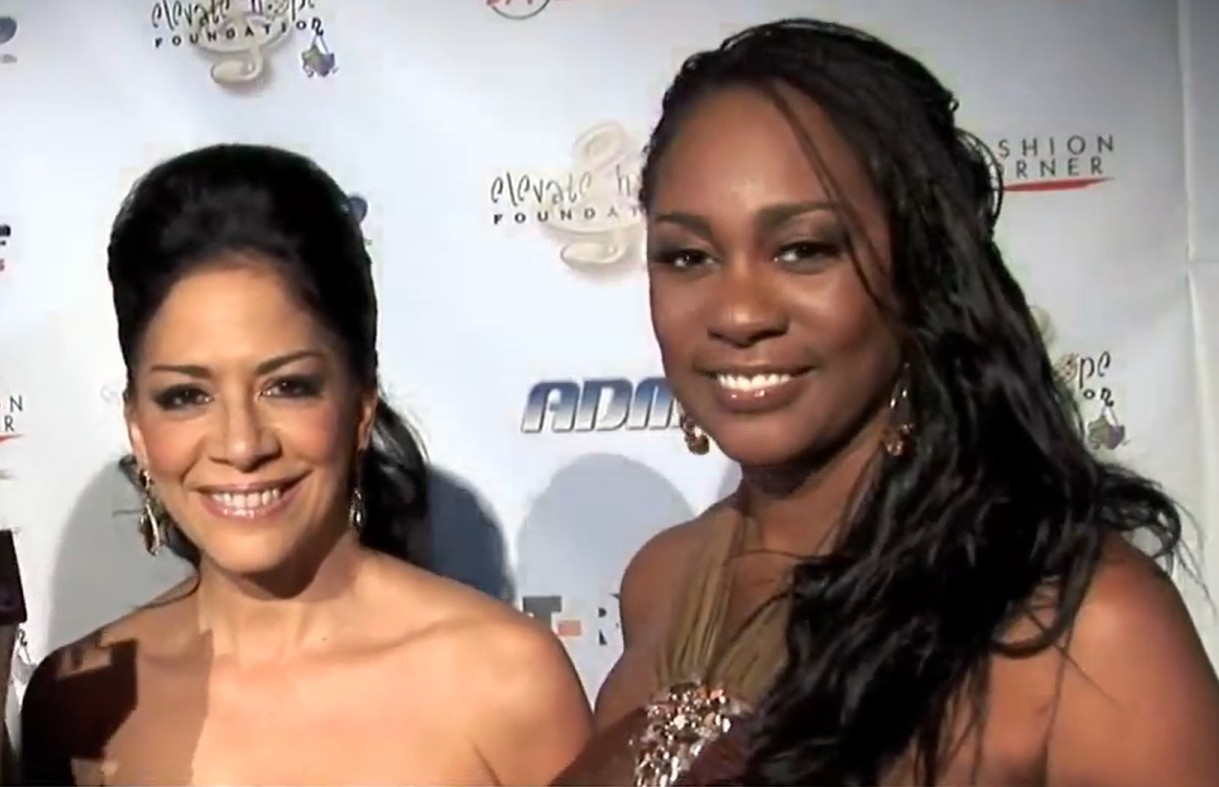
Left to right, E. and Lynn Mabry discuss the Elevate Hope Foundation in 2009

In 2001, Sheila and Lynn Mabry founded the Elevate Hope Foundation. The foundation provided financial assistance to disadvantaged children and children of physical abuse for music programs. The music programs teach how to play music instruments and use digital music studio equipment. In 2002, Elevate Hope hosted its first "An Evening with Angels" event. In 2006, the Elevate Hope Foundation hosted the Circle of Passion charity fashion show at Pacific Design Center in Los Angeles. In 2011, Sheila, Lynn Mabry, Yoshie Akiba, and Jason Hofmann formed Elevate Oakland (formerly known as 51Oakland), a nonprofit organization. The organization provides music and arts programs to public schools located in Oakland, California. In February 2014, the organization held a benefit concert. As of 2024, the organization annually serves over 3000 students in more than 30 schools in the Oakland Unified School District.

In 2020, Sheila donated her drum and percussion instruments to music band Valkyrie Missile after their instruments were stolen and the band began canceling scheduled performances.

Sheila is an honorary member of Zeta Phi Beta Sorority, Inc. She was inducted into the Alpha Omega Chapter on July 11, 2026 at the Grand Boule in Nashville, Tennessee.

== Discography ==
Albums

- The Glamorous Life (1984)
- Romance 1600 (1985)
- Sheila E. (1987)
- Sex Cymbal (1991)
- Writes of Passage (2000)
- Heaven (2001)
- Icon (2013)
- Iconic: Message 4 America (2017)
- Hella Fonk E (2022)
- Bailar (2024)

== Tours ==
Headlining tours

- The Glamorous Life Tour (1984–1985)
- A Love Bizarre Tour (1986)
- Sex Cymbal Japan Tour (1991)
- Sheila E. and C.O.E.D. Tour (2006–2007)
- The E. Family Tour (2011–2013)
- Hella Fonk E. Tour (2023)
- Sheila E. and the E-Train Tour (2024–2026)

Supporting

- Master of the Game Tour (percussionist for George Duke) (1979)
- Diana Ross on Tour (percussionist for Diana Ross) (1980)
- Midnight Love Tour (percussionist for Marvin Gaye) (1982)
- Sign o' the Times Tour (music director for Prince) (1987)
- Lovesexy Tour (music director for Prince) (1988–1989)
- Sweet 19 Blues Tour (music director for Namie Amuro) (1996)
- Seventh All-Starr Band Tour (drummer for Ringo Starr & His All-Starr Band) (2001)
- One Nite Alone... Tour (drummer for Prince) (2002)
- Eighth All-Starr Band Tour (drummer for Ringo Starr & His All-Starr Band) (2003)
- New Zealand Tour (drummer for Abraham Laboriel) (2004)
- Ninth All-Starr Band Tour (drummer for Ringo Starr & His All-Starr Band) (2006)
- Tenth All-Starr Band Tour (drummer for Ringo Starr & His All-Starr Band) (2008)
- 20Ten Tour (percussionist for Prince) (2010)
- Christmas Tour (percussionist for Dave Koz) (2012)

Opening act

- Purple Rain Tour (Prince) (1984–1985)
- Welcome 2 Tour (Prince) (2011)

== Awards and nominations ==
=== Grammy Awards ===
Year	Category	Nominated work	Result	Ref.
Grammy Awards
1985	Best New Artist	Herself	Nominated	
1985	Best R&B Instrumental Performance	"Shortberry Strawcake"	Nominated	
1985	Best Pop Vocal Performance, Female	"The Glamorous Life"	Nominated	
1985	Best Rhythm & Blues Song	"The Glamorous Life"	Nominated	
2025	Best Tropical Latin Album	Bailar	Nominated	
2025	Best Global Music Performance	"Bemba Colorá" (with Gloria Estefan and Mimy Succar)	Won	
Latin Grammy Awards
2021	Lifetime Achievement Award	Herself	Honored	

=== Primetime Emmy Awards ===
Year	Category	Nominated work	Result	Ref.
2010	Outstanding Music Direction	In Performance at the White House: Fiesta Latina	Nominated	
2020	Outstanding Music Direction	Let's Go Crazy: The Grammy Salute To Prince	Nominated	

=== Miscellaneous awards and honors ===
Year	Award	Category	Nominated work	Result	Ref.
1985	American Music Award	Favorite Soul/R&B Female Artist	Herself	Nominated	
1985	American Music Award	Favorite Soul/R&B Female Video Artist	Herself	Nominated	
1985	MTV Video Music Award	Best New Artist in a Video	"The Glamorous Life"	Nominated	
1985	MTV Video Music Award	Best Female Video	"The Glamorous Life"	Nominated	
1985	MTV Video Music Award	Best Choreography	"The Glamorous Life"	Nominated	
2021	Modern Drummer	Reader's Poll Hall of Fame	Herself	Inducted	
2023	Hollywood Walk of Fame		Herself	Inducted	
2025	NAMM TEC Awards	DW Lifetime Achievement Award	Herself	Honored	

- In February 2009, she became an honorary member of Tau Beta Sigma National Honorary Band Sorority by the Eta Delta Chapter located at Howard University in recognition of her humanitarian efforts through and in music.
- She is also an inductee of the National Museum of African American History and Culture.

== See also ==
- List of number-one dance hits (United States)
- List of artists who reached number one on the US Dance chart
