= Eddie M =

- Born: Berkeley, California, U.S.
- Occupations: musician, singer, arranger, songwriter, and producer
- Instrument: Saxophone
- Member of: Back 2 Basics

Eddie Mininfield, known as Eddie M, is an American musician. As a saxophonist, he was a member of Sheila E's touring band and has also toured with Prince on his Purple Rain Tour.

== Early life ==
Eddie M was born and raised in Berkeley, California. He began playing saxophone at age seven and attended the music program at the University of California, Berkeley, before graduating from Berkeley High School in 1979.

== Career ==
Since the early 1980s, Eddie M has toured, performed, and recorded with artists such as Stevie Nicks, Aretha Franklin, Verdine White, Beyoncé, Eric Benét, Teena Marie, Wayman Tisdale, Stevie Wonder, Paula Abdul, Jesse Johnson, Acoustic Alchemy, Martha Munizzi, Yolanda Adams and others. His first professional tour was the "Purple Rain" tour with Prince and Sheila E., and his first recording was with Prince on the album Around the World in a Day.

Eddie M is a member of the American music duo Back 2 Basics, which he formed with John Paris.

== Tours and Performances ==
- Sheila E. - Glamorous Life Tour - USA, England, Netherlands, Germany, Italy, France, Chile (1983)
- Prince and Sheila E. - Purple Rain Tour - USA (1984)
- Sheila E. - Sisters in the Spirit Tour - Yolanda Adams, Juanita Bynum, and Martha Munizi (1984)
- Sheila E. - Romance 1600 Tour - USA (1986)
- Jesse Johnson - Love Struck Tour - USA, France, Italy (1987-1988)
- LeVert - USA (1990-1991)
- Karyn White - USA, Canada, Bahamas, Bermuda, Taiwan, Japan, Singapore, England (1990-1991)
- Stevie Nicks - Whole Lot of Trouble Tour - USA (1991)
- After 7 (1992)
- Wayman Tisdale’s Fifth Quarter Band (Mo’ Jazz) (1994-1995)
- NBA All Star Jam - Phoenix, AZ (1994-1995)
- Teena Marie - USA, London (1990-1994, 2007)
- Sheila E. Tour - Musical Director - Japan (1990-1994)
- Wayman Tisdale’s Fifth Quarter Band (Mo’ Jazz) - Musical Director (1995)
- Karyn White - Promotional Tour - Japan (1995)
- Sinbad’s Soul Festival Tour (1997)
- Eric Benet - Europe, USA (1998-2001)
- Sheila E. - Japan, USA (1998-2002, 2004)
- Beyoncé Knowles - USA (2002)
- Sheryl Crow - Lil Angel Bunny Foundation Gala (2002)
- Stevie Wonder - Lil Angel Bunny Foundation Gala (2002)
- Acoustic Alchemy - USA (2002-2006)

=== Television ===
- Prince - NAACP Image Award Show (2005)
- Prince - Essence Festival - New Orleans (2004)
- Beyoncé Knowles - Jay Leno Tonight Show, 106 & Park (BET) (2002)
- Eric Benet - Soul Train, BET Live, Motown Live, Showtime At The Apollo (1998-2000)
- Sheila E. - Motown Live (1999)
- Magic Hour House Band - Late Night Talk Show (1998)
- Gospel Music Awards, Nashville, TN and New York City - Musical Director (1998)
- The Arsenio Hall Show and Rick Dee’s Up All Night with Keith Washington, Karyn White, LeVert (1985-1993)
- Soul Train with Karyn White, Sheila E. (1985-1993)
- R&B Live’s New Year’s Eve Celebration - Fox Television (1993)
- The Tonight Show with Johnny Carson Featuring Sheila E. (1987)
- The Grammy Awards with Prince (1985)
- American Music Awards and American Video Awards with Sheila E. (1985)
- CBS New Year’s Eve Show with Sheila E. (1985)

=== Music Videos ===
- Stevie Nicks - “Sometimes It’s A Bitch”
- Prince - “I Would Die 4 U”, “Take Me With You”, “America”, “Purple Rain” (Live Concert Video)
- Sheila E - “A Love Bizarre”, “Sister Fate”, “Love On A Blue Train”, “Glamorous Life”, “Romance 1600” (Live Concert Video)
- Karyn White - “Secret Rendezvous”
- Jesse Johnson - “Love Struck”

== Discography ==
=== Recorded | Written Material ===
- Tony Lindsay (Santana) - “Fun in the Sun” (Single)
- Eddie M - Ward Street, JVC/JMI (Released in United States and Japan)
- Eddie M - Gold Circle Records (Released in United States, Canada, and Europe)
- Wayman Tisdale - “Jazz In You”, “Inside Stuff”, “After The Game” - Power Forward, Mo’Jazz
- Prince - “Temptation”, “The Ladder” - Around the World in a Day, Paisley Park
- Sheila E - “Lady Marmalade” - Sex Cymbal, Warner Bros.
- Sheila E - “Promise Me Love” - Sheila E., Paisley Park
- Sheila E - Romance 1600 (All Material), Paisley Park
- Force One Network - MME Program 1 (All Material-Group Member), Qwest Records
- Paula Abdul - “I Need You”, Forever Your Girl, Virgin
- Dale Bozio - “Simon”, Riot In English, Paisley Park
- Jesse Johnson - Every Shade of Love (All Material), A&M Records
- Shalimar - “Plaything”, Circumstantial Evidence (w/LA Reid and Babyface), Solar
- Sheila E - “Hold Me”, Sheila E., Paisley Park
- Sheila E - “Promise Me Love”, Sex Cymbal, Warner Bros.
