= Ultimate (Prince album) =

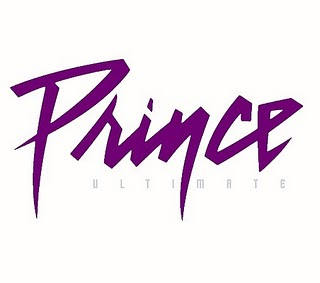

Greatest hits album by Prince
- Released: August 22, 2006
- Recorded: 1979–1992
- Genres: R&B; funk; rock; new wave
- Length: 156:20
- Label: Warner Bros.
- Producer: Prince

Prince chronology
3121 (2006)	Ultimate (2006)	Planet Earth (2007)

Professional ratings
Review scores
Source	Rating
AllMusic	3/5 stars
Pitchfork	8.6/10

Ultimate is a greatest hits album by American recording artist Prince. It was released on August 22, 2006, by Warner Bros. Records. The two-disc set contains a disc of some previously released hits (some in single edit form; only "My Name Is Prince" had not been on a previous hits collection), and another of extended remixes of hits and a B-side, most of which had only been previously released as 12-inch singles.

== Release date controversy ==
The album was originally slated to be released in North America on March 14, 2006, but was canceled just days before its release. This is likely due to Prince not wanting competition with his new 3121, scheduled to be released only one week later. However, promo copies of the album had already been sent to some retailers and were sold before the album's recall. A second release date of May 22 was proposed, but was again canceled and the album's future was unknown for a time. Three months later, it was officially released on August 22, 2006, to generally positive reviews.

== Commercial performance ==
The album debuted at number 61 on the Billboard 200 the week of September 9, 2006; the next week it dropped to number one hundred twenty-three. It remained on the chart for sixteen weeks.

The week following Prince's death the album sold 40,000 units and hit a new peak of four on the Billboard 200 during the week of May 14, 2016; it was the first time that Ultimate rose into the top 10 of the chart.

In the United Kingdom the album opened at number 24 on September 2, 2006; the next week, it fell to number 29 and left the chart three weeks later. Almost one year later, it re-entered at number 6 during the week of August 11, 2007. The week following Prince's death, the album re-entered on the chart at number 10 and the next week; on May 5, 2016, it reached and peaked at number three. Ultimate remained on the UK Albums Chart for twenty seven weeks. It was certified platinum by the BPI on January 24, 2014, denoting shipments of 300,000 units.

== Track listing ==
Disc 1: The Hits
No.	Title	Original album	Length
1.	"I Wanna Be Your Lover" (single edit)	Prince (1979)	2:57
2.	"Uptown" (single edit)	Dirty Mind (1980)	4:11
3.	"Controversy"	Controversy (1981)	7:16
4.	"1999" (single edit)	1999 (1982)	3:38
5.	"Delirious" (edit)	1999	2:40
6.	"When Doves Cry" (single version)	Purple Rain (1984)	3:47
7.	"I Would Die 4 U" (single version; performed by Prince & the Revolution)	Purple Rain	2:58
8.	"Purple Rain" (performed by Prince & the Revolution)	Purple Rain	8:41
9.	"Sign o' the Times" (single edit)	Sign o' the Times (1987)	3:42
10.	"I Could Never Take the Place of Your Man" (edit)	Sign o' the Times	3:41
11.	"Alphabet St."	Lovesexy (1988)	5:38
12.	"Diamonds and Pearls" (edit; performed by Prince & the New Power Generation)	Diamonds and Pearls (1991)	4:20
13.	"Gett Off" (performed by Prince & the New Power Generation)	Diamonds and Pearls	4:31
14.	"Money Don't Matter 2 Night" (performed by Prince & the New Power Generation)	Diamonds and Pearls	4:47
15.	"7" (single version; performed by Prince & the New Power Generation)	Love Symbol (1992)	5:08
16.	"Nothing Compares 2 U" (live; with Rosie Gaines)	The Hits/The B-Sides (1993); originally performed by The Family	5:04
17.	"My Name Is Prince" (single version; performed by Prince & the New Power Generation)	Love Symbol	4:04

Disc 2: The Remixes
No.	Title	Original album	Length
1.	"Let's Go Crazy" (special dance mix; performed by Prince & the Revolution)	Purple Rain	7:36
2.	"Pop Life" (Fresh Dance Mix; performed by Prince & the Revolution)	Around the World in a Day (1985)	6:18
3.	"Let's Work" (dance remix)	Controversy	8:06
4.	"Little Red Corvette" (dance mix)	1999	8:27
5.	"She's Always in My Hair" (12" version; performed by Prince & the Revolution)	"Raspberry Beret" single (1985)	6:32
6.	"Raspberry Beret" (extended 12" version; performed by Prince & the Revolution)	Around the World in a Day	6:34
7.	"Kiss" (extended version; performed by Prince & the Revolution)	Parade (1986)	7:17
8.	"U Got the Look" (Long Look)	Sign o' the Times	6:43
9.	"Hot Thing" (extended remix)	Sign o' the Times	8:31
10.	"Thieves in the Temple" (remix)	Graffiti Bridge (1990)	8:08
11.	"Cream" (N.P.G. Mix Edit; performed by Prince & the New Power Generation)	Diamonds and Pearls	4:52

== Personnel ==
Adapted from the AllMusic credits.

- Annette Atkinson – standup bass
- Tommy Barbarella – sampling
- Timothy Barr – standup bass
- Don Batts – engineer
- Allen Beaulieu – photography
- Steve Beltran – mixing
- Mathieu Bitton – art direction, creative director, design
- Joe Blaney – engineer, mixing
- Atlanta Bliss – brass, trumpet, vocals
- Boni Boyer – Hammond organ, vocals
- Gary Brandt – engineer
- Denyse Buffum – viola
- Keith "KC" Cohen – mixing
- David Daoud Coleman – cello
- Lisa Coleman – keyboards, vocals
- David Z. – arranger
- Damon Dickson – percussion, background vocals
- Dr. Fink – keyboards
- Shelia E – guest artist
- Sheena Easton – vocals
- Mark Ettel – assistant engineer
- Dave Friedlander – engineer
- Lowell Fulson – composer
- Rosie Gaines – organ, sampling, vocals, background vocals
- Tom Garneau – engineer, mixing
- Ron Garrett – remix assistant
- Mick Guzauski – engineer, remixing
- Ray Hahnfeldt – engineer
- Michael Hutchinson – engineer, remixing
- Coke Johnson – engineer
- Suzie Katayama – cello
- Jeff Katz – photography
- Michael Koppelman – engineer, mixing
- Matt Larson – engineer
- Eric Leeds – brass, flute, saxophone, vocals
- David Leonard – engineer
- Tony M. – rap, background vocals
- Peggy Mac – engineer
- Jimmy McCracklin – composer
- Peggy McCreary – engineer, mixing
- Wendy Melvoin – guitar, vocals
- Michael B. – drums
- Eddie Miller – engineer, mixing
- Bob Mockler – engineer, remixing
- New Power Generation – guest artist
- Steve Noonan – engineer
- Novi Novog – viola, violin
- Sid Page – violin
- Ross Pallone – engineer
- Tim Penn – engineer
- Shep Pettibone – editing, producer, remixing
- Brian Poer – engineer
- Prince – arranger, audio production, engineer, mixing, producer, remixing, string arrangements, various instruments, vocals
- Prince & the Revolution – guest artist
- David Rivkin – engineer
- Susan Rogers – engineer
- Bob Rosa – mixing
- Levi Seacer Jr. – bass, rhythm guitar, vocals, background vocals
- Sheila E. – drums, percussion, remixing, vocals
- The Steeles – main personnel
- Sonny T. – bass, background vocals
- David Tickle – engineer
- Junior Vasquez – editing
- Larry E. Williams – tray photo
- Laury Woods – viola
- Bobby Z – percussion

== Promo versions ==
A two disc promo version of Ultimate was sent to radio stations and record stores in Spring 2006. This version has a different track listing from the official release. The promo features a few songs not on the official release, though it excludes the "Let's Work" remix. The promo also presents the songs in rough chronological order as opposed to separating out the remixes. The two disc version is speculated to be the first track listing; Prince later changed the track listing to remove some of the explicit language.

=== Two disc promo ===
Disc one
No.	Title	Original album	Length
1.	"Purple Medley" (performed by The Artist Formerly Known As Prince)	non-album single (1995)	11:04
2.	"I Wanna Be Your Lover" (single edit)		2:57
3.	"Uptown" (edit)		4:11
4.	"Controversy" (LP version)		7:15
5.	"1999" (edit; performed by Prince & the Revolution)		3:38
6.	"Little Red Corvette" (Dance Remix; performed by Prince & the Revolution)		8:22
7.	"Irresistible #####" (performed by Prince & the Revolution)	B-side to "Let's Pretend We're Married" (1983)	4:11
8.	"Let's Go Crazy" (Special Dance Mix; performed by Prince & the Revolution)		7:35
9.	"Erotic City" (12" version)	B-side to "Let's Go Crazy" (1984)	7:22
10.	"I Would Die 4 U" (single version; performed by Prince & the Revolution)		2:57
11.	"When Doves Cry" (edit)		3:47
12.	"Purple Rain" (performed by Prince & the Revolution)		8:41
13.	"Pop Life" (Fresh Dance Mix; performed by Prince & the Revolution)		6:18
14.	"She's Always in My Hair" (12" version; performed by Prince & the Revolution)		6:32
15.	"Raspberry Beret" (12" version; performed by Prince & the Revolution)		6:32

Disc two
No.	Title	Original album	Length
1.	"Kiss" (extended version; performed by Prince & the Revolution)		7:15
2.	"Sign "O" the Times" (single edit)		3:42
3.	"U Got the Look" (Long Look)		6:43
4.	"I Could Never Take the Place of Your Man" (edit)		3:41
5.	"Hot Thing" (extended remix)		8:33
6.	"Alphabet St."		5:39
7.	"Thieves in the Temple" (remix)		8:08
8.	"Diamonds and Pearls" (edit; performed by Prince & The New Power Generation)		4:20
9.	"Gett Off" (performed by Prince & The New Power Generation)		4:31
10.	"Money Don't Matter 2 Night" (performed by Prince & the New Power Generation)		4:48
11.	"Cream" (N.P.G. Mix Edit; performed by Prince & the New Power Generation)		4:51
12.	"7" (acoustic version)	B-side to "7" (1992)	3:54
13.	"Sexy Mutha" (clean remix of "Sexy M.F."; performed by Prince & the New Power Generation)	B-side to "My Name Is Prince" (1992)	3:55
14.	"Nothing Compares 2 U" (live; performed with Rosie Gaines)		5:04
15.	"My Name is Prince" (single version; performed by Prince & the New Power Generation)		4:03

=== In-house promo sampler ===
1. "Purple Medley"
2. "I Wanna Be Your Lover"
3. "Little Red Corvette" (Dance Mix)
4. "Let's Go Crazy" (Special Dance Mix)
5. "Erotic City" (12" Version)
6. "Kiss" (Extended Version)
7. "Money Don't Matter 2 Night"
8. "Cream"

== Charts ==
=== Weekly charts ===
Weekly chart performance for Ultimate
Chart (2006–2016)	Peak position
Australian Albums (ARIA)	6
Austrian Albums (Ö3 Austria)	22
Belgian Albums (Ultratop Flanders)	46
Belgian Albums (Ultratop Wallonia)	52
Canadian Albums (Billboard)	12
Danish Albums (Hitlisten)	6
Dutch Albums (Album Top 100)	39
Finnish Albums (Suomen virallinen lista)	7
French Albums (SNEP)	18
German Albums (Offizielle Top 100)	19
Hungarian Albums (MAHASZ)	11
Irish Albums (IRMA)	3
Italian Albums (FIMI)	23
New Zealand Albums (RMNZ)	3
Norwegian Albums (VG-lista)	10
Portuguese Albums (AFP)	14
Scottish Albums (Official Charts)	3
Swedish Albums (Sverigetopplistan)	7
Swiss Albums (Schweizer Hitparade)	9
UK Albums (Official Charts)	3
US Billboard 200	6

=== Monthly charts ===
Monthly chart performance for Ultimate
Chart (2016)	Peak position
Argentine Monthly Albums (CAPIF)	9

=== Year-end charts ===
Year-end chart performance for Ultimate
Chart (2007)	Position
UK Albums (OCC)	156

== Certifications ==
Certifications for Ultimate
Region	Certification	Certified units/sales
Denmark (IFPI Danmark)	Platinum	20,000^{^}
New Zealand (RMNZ)	Platinum	15,000^{^}
United Kingdom (BPI)	Platinum	300,000^{*}
^{*} Sales figures based on certification alone.^{^} Shipments figures based on certification alone.
