= 4Ever (album) =

Greatest hits album by Prince
- Released: November 22, 2016
- Recorded: December 1976 – May 1993
- Genre: Pop; rock; funk
- Length: 155:06
- Label: NPG; Warner Bros.
- Producer: Prince

Prince chronology
Hit n Run Phase Two (2015)	4Ever (2016)	Anthology: 1995–2010 (2018)

4Ever, also known as Prince 4Ever, is a greatest hits album by American recording artist Prince, released on November 22, 2016, by NPG Records and Warner Bros. Records. It is the first Prince release following the musician's death on April 21, 2016.

== Album information ==
The two-disc set features 40 songs from Prince's tenure with Warner Bros. Records and features recordings from all of his albums between 1978's For You and 1993's The Hits/The B-Sides. It is the first Prince compilation to include his number-one hit single "Batdance" from the soundtrack album to the 1989 film Batman. Aside from "Purple Rain", single edits of songs were used over album versions when possible.

4Ever features the first official release of the song "Moonbeam Levels", which had previously circulated on bootlegs of Prince's unreleased material in a low-quality form. The song had been recorded in 1982 during the sessions for 1999 and was subsequently considered for the unreleased 1988–89 album Rave unto the Joy Fantastic.

== Reception ==
Professional ratings
Review scores
Source	Rating
AllMusic	5/5 stars
The Irish Times	4/5 stars
PopMatters	9/10
The Sydney Morning Herald	4/5 stars

4Ever received positive reviews from critics. Stephen Thomas Erlewine wrote in an AllMusic review that while 4Ever was not a definitive album, "in terms of consumer value, it might be the best single Prince compilation". Chris Gerard stated in a PopMatters review that "by and large, Prince 4Ever is [a successful compilation], and its inclusion of the lesser-known singles adds greatly to its appeal". Tony Clayton-Lea stated in the Irish Times that the compilation "may seem like a futile exercise" because Prince's hits were already well known, but it served as a great introduction to Prince's music. Craig Mathieson wrote in the Sydney Morning Herald that 4Ever was "the starter kit Prince greatest hits package", although he lamented that no songs released after 1993 could be included because they were past Prince's tenure with Warner.

Critics also anticipated that 4Ever was an indicator of more Prince music being released posthumously, given the inclusion of "Moonbeam Levels". Gerald said 4Ever was "obviously intended to be the opening salvo in what fans can expect to be many years worth of posthumous Prince releases". Mathieson also noted the abundance of unreleased Prince music in his review.

== Track listing ==
All tracks are written by Prince, except where noted.

Disc one
No.	Title	Writer(s)	Original release	Length
1.	"1999" (single version)		1999 (1982)	3:38
2.	"Little Red Corvette" (single version)		1999	3:08
3.	"When Doves Cry" (single version)		Purple Rain (1984)	3:48
4.	"Let's Go Crazy" (single version)		Purple Rain	3:50
5.	"Raspberry Beret"		Around the World in a Day (1985)	3:35
6.	"I Wanna Be Your Lover" (single version)		Prince (1979)	3:00
7.	"Soft and Wet"	Prince; Chris Moon	For You (1978)	3:05
8.	"Why You Wanna Treat Me So Bad?"		Prince	3:50
9.	"Uptown" (single version)		Dirty Mind (1980)	4:12
10.	"When You Were Mine"		Dirty Mind	3:45
11.	"Head"		Dirty Mind	4:45
12.	"Gotta Stop (Messin' About)"		non-album single (1981)	2:57
13.	"Controversy" (single version)		Controversy (1981)	3:39
14.	"Let's Work" (single version)		Controversy	3:04
15.	"Delirious" (single version)		1999	2:41
16.	"I Would Die 4 U" (single version)		Purple Rain	3:00
17.	"Take Me with U" (single version)		Purple Rain	3:44
18.	"Paisley Park"		Around the World in a Day	4:45
19.	"Pop Life"		Around the World in a Day	3:45
20.	"Purple Rain"		Purple Rain	8:42

Disc two
No.	Title	Writer(s)	Original release	Length
1.	"Kiss" (single version)		Parade (1986)	3:46
2.	"Sign o' the Times" (single version)		Sign o' the Times (1987)	3:43
3.	"Alphabet St." (single version)		Lovesexy (1988)	2:26
4.	"Batdance" (single version)		Batman (1989)	4:07
5.	"Thieves in the Temple"		Graffiti Bridge (1990)	3:21
6.	"Cream"		Diamonds and Pearls (1991)	4:13
7.	"Mountains"	Prince; Lisa Coleman; Wendy Melvoin	Parade	4:00
8.	"Girls & Boys" (single version)		Parade	3:28
9.	"If I Was Your Girlfriend" (single version)		Sign o' the Times	3:46
10.	"U Got the Look"		Sign o' the Times	3:47
11.	"I Could Never Take the Place of Your Man" (single version)		Sign o' the Times	3:41
12.	"Glam Slam" (single version)		Lovesexy	3:30
13.	"Moonbeam Levels"		Previously unreleased (1982)	4:06
14.	"Diamonds and Pearls" (single version)		Diamonds and Pearls	4:20
15.	"Gett Off" (UK single remix)		Diamonds and Pearls	4:00
16.	"Sexy MF"	Prince; Levi Seacer Jr.; Tony M.	Love Symbol (1992)	5:26
17.	"My Name Is Prince" (single version)	Prince; Tony M.	Love Symbol	4:04
18.	"7" (single version)	Prince; Lowell Fulsom; Jimmy McCracklin	Love Symbol	4:23
19.	"Peach"		The Hits/The B-Sides (1993)	3:48
20.	"Nothing Compares 2 U" (single version)		The Hits/The B-Sides	4:19

== Charts ==
=== Weekly charts ===
2016–2017 weekly chart performance for 4Ever
Chart (2016–2017)	Peak position
Australian Albums (ARIA)	36
Austrian Albums (Ö3 Austria)	64
Belgian Albums (Ultratop Flanders)	11
Belgian Albums (Ultratop Wallonia)	46
Canadian Albums (Billboard)	40
Dutch Albums (Album Top 100)	10
French Albums (SNEP)	41
German Albums (Offizielle Top 100)	87
Hungarian Albums (MAHASZ)	18
Irish Albums (OCC)	15
Italian Albums (FIMI)	64
New Zealand Heatseeker Albums (RMNZ)	1
Portuguese Albums (AFP)	29
Scottish Albums (OCC)	22
Swiss Albums (Schweizer Hitparade)	21
UK Albums (OCC)	21
UK R&B Albums (OCC)	2
US Billboard 200	33
US Top R&B/Hip-Hop Albums (Billboard)	4

2019 weekly chart performance for 4Ever
Chart (2019)	Peak position
Spanish Albums (PROMUSICAE)	45

=== Year-end charts ===
2016 year-end chart performance for 4Ever
Chart (2016)	Position
Belgian Albums (Ultratop Flanders)	150
UK Albums (OCC)	86

2017 year-end chart performance for 4Ever
Chart (2017)	Position
Belgian Albums (Ultratop Flanders)	152
US Billboard 200	158
US Top R&B/Hip-Hop Albums (Billboard)	63

== Certifications ==
Certifications for 4Ever
Region	Certification	Certified units/sales
United Kingdom (BPI)	Platinum	300,000^{‡}
^{‡} Sales+streaming figures based on certification alone.
