= The Hits/The B-Sides =

Box set by Prince
- Released: September 10, 1993
- Studios: Paisley Park, Chanhassen
- Length: 227:03
- Labels: Paisley Park; Warner Bros.
- Producers: The New Power Generation; Prince; The Revolution; Tommy Vicari

Prince chronology
Love Symbol (1992)	The Hits/The B-Sides (1993)	The Beautiful Experience (1994)

Alternative cover
- Album covers for The Hits 1 and The Hits 2

Singles from The Hits/The B-Sides
- 1. "Pink Cashmere" Released: August 31, 1993; 2. "Peach" Released: October 4, 1993; 3. "Controversy" Released: December 11, 1993 (UK)

The Hits/The B-Sides is a box set by American recording artist Prince. It was released on September 10, 1993, by Paisley Park Records and Warner Bros. Records. The album is a comprehensive three-disc set consisting of many of his hit singles and fan favorites. It was the last commercial release by Prince before he changed his stage name to an unpronounceable symbol.

Professional ratings
Review scores
Source	Rating
AllMusic	4.5/5 stars
Christgau's Consumer Guide	B+
Entertainment Weekly	A
MusicHound Rock	4.5/5
Music Week	5/5 stars
NME	6/10
Q	5/5 stars
Rolling Stone	4.5/5 stars
The Rolling Stone Album Guide	4/5 stars
Tom Hull	A−

== Album information ==
Discs one and two were released separately, under the titles The Hits 1 and The Hits 2 respectively, but The B-Sides disc could only be obtained by purchasing the full set. The separate Hits discs and the full set were all released on the same day. Most of the songs (A-side and B-sides) on The Hits/The B-Sides are represented in their edited single form. Exceptions to this were "Alphabet St.", "7", "Little Red Corvette", "Sexy MF", "Let's Go Crazy" and "Purple Rain". This compilation marks the first time the single version of "Kiss" was made available on CD. The third disc of B-sides also featured the 7-inch edits, with the exceptions of "200 Balloons", "17 Days", "Gotta Stop (Messin' About)", "Horny Toad", "Irresistible Bitch", "I Love U in Me", "God" and "How Come U Don't Call Me Anymore?" which were all original full-length recordings from the original singles.

Among the previously unreleased material was the rare live version of "4 the Tears in Your Eyes", only previously released in a 1985 TV broadcast for the Live Aid concerts. Also included was a live version of "Nothing Compares 2 U", recorded live January 27, 1992, at Paisley Park with the New Power Generation. The other four new tracks were outtakes. The oldest track was "Power Fantastic", a moody ballad once considered for the Dream Factory project of 1986. Another ballad, "Pink Cashmere", was broadcast before some of the Lovesexy World Tour shows, dating it back to 1988 originally for his abandoned Rave Un2 the Joy Fantastic project. "Peach" was regularly played on the Act I Tour (1993) and "Pope" was played live during some 1993 after shows. "Pope" was actually in the short-lived musical ballet Glam Slam Ulysses, which also spawned several songs later released on Come, The Gold Experience and Crystal Ball. Live jams of "Peach" often extended into the title track of Chaos and Disorder.

== Commercial performance ==
In the United States the album debuted at number 19 on the Billboard 200 the week of October 2, 1993, with more than 87,000 copies sold combining the two abbreviated versions, Hits 1 and Hits 2; the last two debuted at numbers 46 and 55, respectively, the same week. The next week, the album dropped to number 32 on the chart. It was present on the chart for 18 weeks.

The week following Prince's death, the album sold 40,000 equivalent copies (24,000 in pure album sales) thus allowing the album to re-enter the Billboard 200 at number 6. The next week it sold 106,000 units and hit a new peak of number four on the chart. The album was certified platinum by the RIAA on September 14, 1993, for shipments of one million.

As of April 2016 Hits 1 has sold 1,451,000 copies and Hits 2 has sold 1,738,000 units according to Nielsen SoundScan; combined, they have sold over 3,189,000 copies in the United States.

In the United Kingdom, the album debuted and peaked at number four on the UK Albums Chart the week of September 25, 1993, the next week it fell off to number 12 and remained on the chart for 18 weeks. Hits 1 debuted and peaked at number five on September 25, 1993, while Hits 2 opened at number six the same weeks and two weeks later it reached and peaked at number five. The Hits/The B Sides was certified gold by the BPI on July 22, 2013, denoting shipments of 100,000 units.

== Track listing ==
All tracks are written by and performed by Prince, except where noted.

Disc one: The Hits 1
No.	Title	Writer(s)	Original release	Length
1.	"When Doves Cry" (single edit)		Purple Rain (1984)	3:48
2.	"Pop Life" (performed by Prince and The Revolution)		Around the World in a Day (1985)	3:42
3.	"Soft and Wet"	Prince; Chris Moon	For You (1978)	3:03
4.	"I Feel for You"		Prince (1979)	3:25
5.	"Why You Wanna Treat Me So Bad?"		Prince	3:48
6.	"When You Were Mine"		Dirty Mind (1980)	3:43
7.	"Uptown" (single edit)		Dirty Mind	4:09
8.	"Let's Go Crazy" (performed by Prince and The Revolution)		Purple Rain (1984)	4:39
9.	"1999" (single edit) (performed by Prince and The Revolution)		1999 (1982)	3:38
10.	"I Could Never Take the Place of Your Man"		Sign o' the Times (1987)	3:38
11.	"Nothing Compares 2 U" (live January 27, 1992) (performed by Prince and the New Power Generation featuring Rosie Gaines)		Previously unreleased (1992)	4:58
12.	"Adore" (edited version)		Sign o' the Times	4:41
13.	"Pink Cashmere"		Previously unreleased (1988)	6:15
14.	"Alphabet St."		Lovesexy (1988)	5:39
15.	"Sign o' the Times" (single edit)		Sign o' the Times	3:43
16.	"Thieves in the Temple"		Graffiti Bridge (1990)	3:20
17.	"Diamonds and Pearls" (single edit) (performed by Prince and the New Power Generation)		Diamonds and Pearls (1991)	4:20
18.	"7" (performed by Prince and the New Power Generation)	Prince; Jimmy McCracklin; Lowell Fulson	Love Symbol (1992)	5:09
Total length:				75:40

Disc two: The Hits 2
No.	Title	Writer(s)	Original release	Length
1.	"Controversy" (single edit)		Controversy (1981)	3:35
2.	"Dirty Mind" (single edit)	Prince; Doctor Fink	Dirty Mind	3:49
3.	"I Wanna Be Your Lover" (single edit)		Prince	2:58
4.	"Head"		Dirty Mind	4:43
5.	"Do Me, Baby" (single edit)		Controversy	3:57
6.	"Delirious" (single edit) (performed by Prince and The Revolution)		1999	2:39
7.	"Little Red Corvette" (performed by Prince and The Revolution)		1999	4:56
8.	"I Would Die 4 U" (single version) (performed by Prince and The Revolution)		Purple Rain	2:56
9.	"Raspberry Beret" (performed by Prince and The Revolution)		Around the World in a Day	3:32
10.	"If I Was Your Girlfriend" (single edit)		Sign o' the Times	3:46
11.	"Kiss" (single version) (performed by Prince and The Revolution)		Parade (1986)	3:46
12.	"Peach"		Previously unreleased (1992)	3:48
13.	"U Got the Look" (featuring Sheena Easton)		Sign o' the Times	3:47
14.	"Sexy M.F." (performed by Prince and the New Power Generation)	Prince; Tony M.; Levi Seacer Jr.	Love Symbol	5:26
15.	"Gett Off" (performed by Prince and the New Power Generation)		Diamonds and Pearls	4:30
16.	"Cream" (performed by Prince and the New Power Generation)		Diamonds and Pearls	4:13
17.	"Pope" (featuring Mayte)		Previously unreleased (1993)	3:28
18.	"Purple Rain" (performed by Prince and The Revolution)		Purple Rain	8:40
Total length:				74:31

Disc three: The B-Sides
No.	Title	Writer(s)	A-side	Length
1.	"Hello" (performed by Prince and The Revolution)		"Pop Life" (1985)	3:24
2.	"200 Balloons"		"Batdance" (1989)	5:06
3.	"Escape"		"Glam Slam" (1988)	3:30
4.	"Gotta Stop (Messin' About)"		Non-album single (1981), later released as a B-side of "Let's Work" (1982)	2:55
5.	"Horny Toad"		"Delirious" (1983)	2:12
6.	"Feel U Up"		"Partyman" (1989)	3:44
7.	"Girl" (performed by Prince and The Revolution)	Prince; Bobby Z.; Matt Fink; Lisa Coleman; Brown Mark; Wendy Melvoin	"America" (1985)	3:48
8.	"I Love U in Me"		"The Arms of Orion" (1989)	4:13
9.	"Erotic City" (performed by Prince and The Revolution)		"Let's Go Crazy" (1984)	3:55
10.	"Shockadelica"		"If I Was Your Girlfriend" (1987)	3:31
11.	"Irresistible Bitch"		"Let's Pretend We're Married" (1983)	4:12
12.	"Scarlet Pussy" (performed by Camille)	Prince (but credited to his alter ego, Camille)	"I Wish U Heaven" (1988)	4:18
13.	"La, La, La, He, He, Hee"	Prince; Easton	"Sign o' the Times" (1987)	3:22
14.	"She's Always in My Hair" (performed by Prince and The Revolution)	Prince; Bobby Z.; Fink; Coleman; Brown Mark; Melvoin	"Raspberry Beret" (1985)	3:27
15.	"17 Days" (performed by Prince and The Revolution)	Prince; Fink; Coleman; Melvoin	"When Doves Cry" (1984)	3:55
16.	"How Come U Don't Call Me Anymore?"		"1999" (1982)	3:51
17.	"Another Lonely Christmas" (performed by Prince and The Revolution)	Prince; Bobby Z.; Fink; Coleman; Brown Mark; Melvoin	"I Would Die 4 U" (1984)	4:52
18.	"God" (performed by Prince and The Revolution)		"Purple Rain" (1984)	4:03
19.	"4 the Tears in Your Eyes" (live)		Previously unreleased; studio version released on the USA for Africa album We Are the World (1985)	3:24
20.	"Power Fantastic"	Prince; Coleman; Melvoin	Previously unreleased (1986)	4:45
Total length:				76:28

== Personnel ==
Adapted from Benoît Clerc, Duane Tudahl, Guitarcloud, Mix, Morris Day and David Ritz, Jon Regen, and Michaelangelo Matos

=== Musicians ===
- Prince – lead vocals (all tracks), rap (track 2;15), backing vocals (tracks 1;1–10, 1;12–14, 1;16–18, 2;1–13, 2;15–18, 3;1–15, 3;17–19), electric guitar (tracks 1;1, 1;3–11, 1;13–17, 2;1–4, 2;6–8, 2;11–13, 2;15–16, 2;18, 3;1–5, 3;10, 3;12–15, 3;17), acoustic guitar (tracks 1;10, 1;13, 1;18, 2;3, 2;11, 3;3, 3;9), twelve-string acoustic guitar (tracks 2;9, 3;19), bass guitar (tracks 1;2–7, 1;9–10, 1;12–14, 1;18, 2;1–7, 2;9–10, 3;1–6, 3;9–15, 3;17), synthesizers (tracks 1;13–14, 1;17–18, 2;4, 2;7–8, 2;17–18, 3;2–3, 3;5, 3;7, 3;10–15, 3;17–18), ARP Omni (tracks 1;6–7, 2;5), ARP Omni 2 (track 1;9), ARP Pro Soloist (track 1;3), ARP String Ensemble (track 2;3), Ensoniq Mirage (tracks 1;12, 3;10, 3;13), Fairlight CMI (tracks 1;10, 1;12, 1;15, 2;10, 2;13, 3;1, 3;6, 3;10), Minimoog (tracks 1;3, 2;3), Polymoog (tracks 1;3, 1;7, 2;3), Oberheim Four Voice (tracks 1;3–4, 2;3), Oberheim OB-X (tracks 1;6–7, 2;1–2, 2;5, 3;1, 3;4), Oberheim OB-SX (track 2;1), Oberheim OB-Xa (tracks 1;1, 1;9, 2;6), Oberheim OB-8 (tracks 1;2, 1;10, 3;6, 3;9), Roland D-50 (tracks 1;14, 1;16), Sequential Prophet VS (tracks 1;12, 2;10, 2;13, 3;6), Yamaha DX7 (tracks 1;1, 2;9, 3;1, 3;8), piano (tracks 1;2, 1;11, 3;16, 3;18), Yamaha CP-70 (tracks 2;3, 2;5), Yamaha CP-80 (track 2;9), Hohner Clavinet (tracks 1;3–5, 1;7, 2;3–4), Hammond organ (track 1;12), drums (tracks 1;3–7, 1;12, 2;1–5, 3;1, 3;4, 3;11–14, 3;17), Dynacord ADD-One (tracks 1;13–14, 1;16), Linn LM-1 (tracks 1;1, 1;8–9, 1;12–14, 2;6–7, 2;9–10, 3;6, 3;15), LinnDrum (tracks 1;10, 1;15–16, 3;9), slapstick (track 1;3), claps (tracks 1;4, 1;10, 1;14, 1;18, 3;4–5), Pollard Syndrum (track 1;4), Pearl SY-1 Syncussion (tracks 1;9, 2;1, 2;7), cymbals (track 1;9), cuíca (track 1;14), Roland R-8 (tracks 1;17, 2;15), programming (tracks 1;18, 2;17, 3;1–2, 3;5, 3;7, 3;10–14), finger cymbals (tracks 1;18, 3;14, 3;20), percussion (tracks 1;18, 2;9, 3;14–15, 3;20), finger snaps (tracks 2;6, 3;7), Publison IM90 Infernal Machine (tracks 2;10, 2;13, 3;12)
- Lisa Coleman – lead vocals (track 1;9), spoken vocals (track 2;4), background vocals (tracks 1;2, 1;8–9, 2;1, 2;6–9, 2;18, 3;11, 3;15, 3;19), synthesizers (tracks 2;8, 2;18), Oberheim OB-SX (track 1;8), electric piano (track 3;19), piano (track 3;20)
- Sheila E. – lead vocals (tracks 3;9, 3;12), backing vocals (tracks 3;3, 3;9, 3;12–13), drums (tracks 1;2, 1;14), Linn LM-1 (track 1;2, 2;13), claps (track 1;14), synth drum fills (track 1;17), cymbals (track 2;13), hi-hat (track 2;13), cowbells (track 2;13), timbales (track 2;13), percussion (track 3;13)
- Wendy Melvoin – background vocals (tracks 1;2, 1;8, 2;8, 2;18, 3;11, 3;15, 3;19), electric guitar (tracks 1;8, 2;8–9, 2;18, 3;19–20)
- André Cymone – background vocals (track 1;5)
- Brownmark – backing vocals (tracks 1;8, 2;8, 2;18), bass (tracks 1;8, 2;8, 2;18)
- Doctor Fink – background vocals (tracks 1;8, 2;18), synthesizers (track 2;8), ARP Omni (track 2;2), ARP Omni 2 (track 2;4), Memorymoog (track 2;8), Oberheim OB-Xa (track 1;8), Yamaha CP-70 (track 2;18)
- Bobby Z. – Linn LM-1 (tracks 1;8, 2;8, 2;18), Simmons SDSV (tracks 1;8, 2;18), Pearl SY-1 Syncussion (tracks 1;8–9, 2;8), cymbals (tracks 1;8, 2;8, 2;18), drums (track 3;20)
- Dez Dickerson – lead vocals (track 1;9), backing vocals (tracks 1;9, 2;7), electric guitar solo (track 2;7)
- Jesse Johnson – backing vocals
- Jill Jones – lead vocals (track 1;9), backing vocals (tracks 1;9, 3;1, 3;10, 3;15)
- Tommy Barbarella – synthesizers (tracks 1;11, 1;17, 2;14–16), Hammond organ (track 2;14)
- Michael B. – drums (tracks 1;11, 1;17, 2;12, 2;14–16)
- Rosie Gaines – lead vocals (tracks 1;11, 1;17, 2;15), backing vocals (tracks 1;17, 2;15–16), synthesizers (track 1;11), Hammond organ (track 2;16)
- Kathy Jensen – baritone saxophone (track 1;11, 2;14)
- Levi Seacer Jr. – lead vocals (track 2;14), backing vocals (track 2;15), electric guitar (track 1;11, 2;14–16)
- Sonny T. – bass guitar (tracks 1;11, 1;17, 2;12, 2;14–16)
- Atlanta Bliss – trumpet (tracks 1;12, 1;14, 3;2, 3;6, 3;13, 3;20)
- Eric Leeds – saxophone (tracks 1;12, 1;14, 3;3, 3;6, 3;12–13), flute (tracks 1;15, 3;12, 3;20)
- Novi Novog – alto violin (tracks 1;12, 2;9, 2;18), violin (track 2;18)
- Boni Boyer – backing vocals (tracks 1;14, 3;3)
- Cat Glover – rap (track 1;14), backing vocals (track 1;14)
- Lester Chambers – harmonica (sampled from "I Can't Stand It" (1967) by The Chambers Brothers) (track 1;16)
- Morris Day – possible drums (track 2;1)
- David Coleman, Suzie Katayama – cello (tracks 2;9, 2;18)
- Susannah Melvoin – backing vocals (track 2;9)
- Bruce DeShazer, Marr Star – backing vocals (track 2;11)
- David Z. – Yamaha DX7 (track 2;11), Linn 9000 (track 2;11)
- Mayte – lead vocals (track 2;17), backing vocals (track 2;12)
- Sheena Easton – lead vocals (track 2;13)
- Dave Dickinson – backing vocals (track 2;14–15), percussion (track 2;14–15)
- Brian Gallagher – tenor saxophone (track 2;14)
- DJ Graves – scratching (tracks 2;14, 2;17)
- Dave Jensen, Steve Strand – trumpet (track 2;14)
- Kirk Johnson – backing vocals (track 2;14–15), percussion (track 2;14–15)
- Tony M. – rap (tracks 2;14–15)
- Michael B. Nelson – trombone (track 2;14)
- Brenda Bennett – lead vocals (track 3;15)

=== Technical ===
- Prince – producer (all tracks), recording engineer (as "Jamie Starr") (tracks 1;6–7, 2;2, 2;4, 3;4)
- Tommy Vicari – producer (track 1;3), recording engineer (track 1;3)
- David Leonard – recording engineer (tracks 1;1, 1;8, 2;8, 2;18, 3;1, 3;11)
- Peggy McCreary – recording engineer (tracks 1;1–2, 2;1, 2;5–6, 2;8, 2;11, 2;18, 3;1, 3;9, 3;11, 3;15–17)
- Gary Brandt – recording engineer (tracks 1;4–5, 2;3)
- Bob Mockler – recording engineer (tracks 1;4–5, 2;1, 2;3, 2;5)
- Don Batts – recording engineer (tracks 1;6–7, 1;9, 2;2, 2;4, 2;7, 3;4–5, 3;7)
- Susan Rogers – recording engineer (tracks 1;8, 1;10, 1;12, 1;15, 2;9–11, 2;13, 3;1, 3;6–7, 3;10, 3;13, 3;18–20)
- Coke Johnson – recording engineer (tracks 1;10, 1;12, 1;15, 2;11, 2;13, 3;6)
- Eddie Miller – recording engineer (tracks 1;13–14, 3;3, 3;12)
- Arne Frager – recording engineer (track 1;13)
- Joe Blaney – recording engineer (track 1;14)
- Michael Koppelman – recording engineer (tracks 1;16–18, 2;14–16)
- Tom Garneau – recording engineer (track 1;16)
- David Friedlander, Ray Hahnfeldt, Brian Poer – recording engineers (tracks 1;18, 2;14)
- Ray Hahnfeldt – recording engineer (tracks 1;18, 2;14, 2;17)
- Steve Noonan – recording engineer (tracks 1;18, 2;12)
- Mick Guzauski, Ross Pallone – recording engineers (tracks 2;1, 2;5)
- David Rivkin – recording engineer (tracks 2;8, 2;11, 2;18)
- David Hewitt, Kooster McAllister – recording engineers (tracks 2;8, 2;18)
- Mark Forrester – recording engineer (track 2;12)
- Femi Jiya – recording engineer (track 3;2)
- David Tickle – recording engineer (tracks 3;7, 3;19)
- Bill Jackson – recording engineer (tracks 3;14–15)
- Lisa Coleman, Wendy Melvoin – string arrangement (track 1;2)
- Clare Fischer – orchestra arrangement (track 1;13)

== Charts ==
=== The Hits/The B-Sides ===
==== Weekly charts ====
Initial weekly chart performance for The Hits/The B-Sides
Chart (1993)	Peak position
Australian Albums (ARIA)	5
Canada Top Albums/CDs (RPM)	57
Dutch Albums (Album Top 100)	10
German Albums (Offizielle Top 100)	58
New Zealand Albums (RMNZ)	15
Norwegian Albums (VG-lista)	11
Swedish Albums (Sverigetopplistan)	19
Swiss Albums (Schweizer Hitparade)	9
UK Albums (Official Charts)	4
US Billboard 200	19
US Top R&B/Hip-Hop Albums (Billboard)	6

2005 weekly chart performance for The Hits/The B-Sides
Chart (2005)	Peak position
Belgian Albums (Ultratop Flanders)	40
Danish Albums (Hitlisten)	5
Dutch Albums (Album Top 100)	11

Weekly chart performance for The Hits/The B-Sides upon Prince's death
Chart (2016)	Peak position
Australian Albums (ARIA)	4
Dutch Albums (Album Top 100)	23
French Albums (SNEP)	101
German Albums (Offizielle Top 100)	71
Italian Albums (FIMI)	67
New Zealand Albums (RMNZ)	1
Swedish Albums (Sverigetopplistan)	19
US Billboard 200	4

2019 weekly chart performance for The Hits/The B-Sides
Chart (2019)	Peak position
Belgian Albums (Ultratop Wallonia)	172

==== Year-end charts ====
Year-end chart performance of The Hits/The B-Sides on the year of Prince's death
Chart (2016)	Position
New Zealand Albums (RMNZ)	23
US Billboard 200	159

=== The Hits 1 ===
==== Weekly charts ====
Initial weekly chart performance for The Hits 1
Chart (1993)	Peak position
Australian Albums (ARIA)	19
Austrian Albums (Ö3 Austria)	7
Canada Top Albums/CDs (RPM)	46
Dutch Albums (Album Top 100)	14
European Albums (European Top 100 Albums)	10
German Albums (Offizielle Top 100)	20
New Zealand Albums (RMNZ)	12
Norwegian Albums (VG-lista)	15
Spanish Albums (AFYVE)	8
Swedish Albums (Sverigetopplistan)	10
Swiss Albums (Schweizer Hitparade)	22
UK Albums (Official Charts)	5
US Billboard 200	46

Weekly chart performance for The Hits 1 upon Prince's death
Chart (2016)	Peak position
Australian Albums (ARIA)	40
Austrian Albums (Ö3 Austria)	53
Dutch CombiAlbums (MegaCharts)	55
Dutch Midprice Albums (MegaCharts)	11
French Albums (SNEP)	108
Italian Albums (FIMI)	60
New Zealand Albums (RMNZ)	17
Portuguese Albums (AFP)	17
Scottish Albums (Official Charts)	4

==== Year-end charts ====
1993 year-end chart performance for The Hits 1
Chart (1993)	Position
European Albums (European Top 100 Albums)	91
UK Albums (OCC)	51

=== The Hits 2 ===
==== Weekly charts ====
Initial weekly chart performance for The Hits 2
Chart (1993–94)	Peak position
Australian Albums (ARIA)	20
Austrian Albums (Ö3 Austria)	9
Canada Top Albums/CDs (RPM)	50
Dutch Albums (Album Top 100)	15
European Albums (European Top 100 Albums)	11
German Albums (Offizielle Top 100)	19
Norwegian Albums (VG-lista)	14
New Zealand Albums (RMNZ)	8
Spanish Albums (AFYVE)	6
Swiss Albums (Schweizer Hitparade)	10
UK Albums (Official Charts)	5
UK R&B Albums (Official Charts)	25
US Billboard 200	54

Weekly chart performance for The Hits 2 upon Prince's death
Chart (2016)	Peak position
Dutch CombiAlbum (MegaCharts)	46
Dutch Midprice Albums (MegaCharts)	9
Portuguese Albums (AFP)	13
Scottish Albums (Official Charts)	54
Swiss Albums (Schweizer Hitparade)	70

==== Year-end charts ====
1993 year-end chart performance for The Hits 2
Chart (1993)	Position
European Albums (European Top 100 Albums)	68
UK Albums (OCC)	39

== Certifications ==
Certifications and sales for The Hits/The B-Sides
Region	Certification	Certified units/sales
Australia (ARIA)	2× Platinum	140,000^{^}
New Zealand (RMNZ)	Platinum	15,000^{^}
Singapore (SPVA)	—	5,000
Spain (Promusicae)	Gold	50,000^{^}
United Kingdom (BPI)	Gold	100,000^{*}
United States (RIAA)	Platinum	1,000,000^{^}
^{*} Sales figures based on certification alone.^{^} Shipments figures based on certification alone.

== Release history ==
Release dates for The Hits/The B-Sides
Country	Date	Label
Germany	September 10, 1993	Warner
United Kingdom	September 14, 1993	Warner
United States	September 14, 1993	Paisley Park; Warner Bros.

== See also ==
- The Hits Collection, accompanying home video of select music videos from Prince.
