= Controversy Tour =

1981–82 concert tour by Prince

- National tour by Prince
- Poster to the concert in Charlotte
- Location: North America
- Associated album: Controversy
- Start date: November 20, 1981
- End date: March 14, 1982
- Legs: 1
- No. of shows: 61

Prince concert chronology
- Dirty Mind Tour (1980–81); Controversy Tour (1981–82); 1999 Tour (1982–83)

The Controversy Tour was a concert tour by American recording artist Prince in support of his fourth studio album Controversy. The tour included Zapp and Roger and The Time as an opening act.

== Background ==
The Controversy Tour marked the debut of Mark Brown, a.k.a. Brown Mark, on bass guitar, replacing the departed André Cymone, and the introduction of Prince's new bodyguard, Chick Huntsberry. At first, Prince contemplated dismissing the huge Huntsberry after only being on tour with him for a few days, as Prince thought he was too big and he scared him. Guitarist Dez Dickerson talked him out of it and he eventually became a confidant to Prince and later appeared in Purple Rain as a bouncer. This tour was also notable for Prince's new side group The Time joining him on tour and the resulting backstage drama and arising tension that developed between the two bands.

Ultimately Prince would kick The Time off the 1999 Tour. The conflict came to a head on the final night of the tour in Cincinnati as during The Time's set, Prince and some of the members in his band began egging them from off stage. Near the end of the set, they grabbed Jerome Benton from the stage and proceeded to "tar and feather" him by pouring honey all over him and dumping trash on him. Things got further escalated after The Time's performance, guitarist Jesse Johnson was handcuffed to a wall-mounted coat rack and further humiliated with Prince throwing Doritos and other food at him. When The Time went to retaliate, they were stopped by the tour manager and told there would be no interruptions during Prince's performance, but as soon as he left the stage, a food fight erupted between the two bands. When the battle continued at the hotel causing damage, Prince made Morris Day pay for all damages, claiming that he had started the whole thing.

== Opening acts ==
- The Time
- Zapp featuring Roger

== Set list ==
November 20, 1981, at the Stanley Theatre, Pittsburgh, Pennsylvania:

1. "The Second Coming"
2. "Sexuality"
3. "Why You Wanna Treat Me So Bad?"
4. "Jack U Off"
5. "When You Were Mine"
6. "I Wanna Be Your Lover"
7. "Head"
8. "Annie Christian"
9. "Dirty Mind"
10. "Do Me, Baby"
11. "Let's Work"
12. "Controversy"
13. "Uptown"
14. "Partyup"

January 30, 1982, at the Capitol Theatre, Passaic, New Jersey:

1. "The Second Coming"
2. "Uptown"
3. "Why You Wanna Treat Me So Bad?"
4. "I Wanna Be Your Lover"
5. "Head"
6. "Dirty Mind"
7. "Do Me, Baby"
8. "Controversy"
9. "Let's Work"
10. "Jack U Off"

== Tour dates ==
Prior to the tour, in October 1981 Prince played two shows at the Los Angeles Memorial Coliseum as an opening act for The Rolling Stones. On the first date, Prince and his band did not finish their set, as the crowd turned hostile towards him. Dressed in his controversial bikini briefs and trench coat, and singing his sexually androgynous lyrics, he was run off stage after 25 minutes of the crowd booing, throwing shoes and beer bottles at him. Off stage, security escorted Prince to his trailer, they described him as emotionally distraught and crying softly. He was later heard cussing at his band and swearing he would never open for the Rolling Stones again.

After the show, Prince immediately flew back home to Minneapolis. After speaking with Dez Dickerson, manager Steve Fargnoli, and Mick Jagger himself, they convinced him to return for the second concert. Amidst the same hostility, as The Rolling Stones' fans heard about the incident at the first concert and came prepared to dog Prince again, Prince and his band finished their set this time. Backstage, Prince referred to the crowd as, "Tasteless in music and mentally retarded".

List of 1981 concerts, showing date, city, country, venue, tickets sold, number of available tickets and gross revenue
Date	City	Country	Venue	Attendance	Revenue
November 20, 1981	Pittsburgh	United States	Stanley Theater		
November 21, 1981	Washington, D.C.	United States	Warner Theatre	2,000 / 3,400 (59%)	
November 25, 1981	Greenville	United States	Greenville Memorial Auditorium		
November 26, 1981	Baltimore	United States	Baltimore Civic Center		
November 27, 1981	Charlotte	United States	Charlotte Coliseum		
November 29, 1981	Nashville	United States	Nashville Municipal Auditorium		
December 2, 1981	New York City	United States	The Palladium		
December 4, 1981	Detroit	United States	Joe Louis Arena		
December 5, 1981	Chicago	United States	Arie Crown Theater (Note: Two shows.)	8,638 / 8,638 (100%)	$95,087
December 6, 1981	St. Louis	United States	Kiel Auditorium		
December 9, 1981	Houston	United States	The Summit		
December 10, 1981	Atlanta	United States	The Omni		
December 11, 1981	Winston-Salem	United States	Winston-Salem Memorial Coliseum		
December 12, 1981	Columbia	United States	Carolina Coliseum		
December 13, 1981	Fayetteville	United States	Cumberland County Memorial Arena		
December ??, 1981	Savannah	United States	Savannah Civic Center		
December 17, 1981	Columbus	United States	Columbus Municipal Auditorium		
December 18, 1981	Baton Rouge	United States	Riverside Centroplex		
December 19, 1981	Dallas	United States	Dallas Convention Center		
December 20, 1981	Houston	United States	The Summit	14,000 / 14,000 (100%)	
December 26, 1981	Milwaukee	United States	MECCA Arena		
December 27, 1981	Dayton	United States	Hara Arena		
December 28, 1981	Toledo	United States	Toledo Sports Arena	4,325 / 6,500 (67%)	
December 29, 1981	Columbus	United States	Veterans Memorial Auditorium		
December 30, 1981	Louisville	United States	Louisville Gardens	6,850 / 6,850 (100%)	
December 31, 1981	Macon	United States	Macon Coliseum	8,400 / 9,252 (91%)	

List of 1982 concerts, showing date, city, country, venue, tickets sold, number of available tickets and gross revenue
Date	City	Country	Venue	Attendance	Revenue
January 2, 1982	Lakeland	United States	Lakeland Civic Center		
January 3, 1982	Jacksonville	United States	Jacksonville Memorial Coliseum		
January 28, 1982	Richmond	United States	Richmond Coliseum		
January 29, 1982	Landover	United States	Capital Centre		
January 30, 1982	Passaic	United States	Capitol Theatre		
February 1, 1982	Ann Arbor	United States	Hill Auditorium		
February 4, 1982	Saginaw	United States	Saginaw Civic Center		
February 5, 1982	Cleveland	United States	Cleveland Public Auditorium		
February 6, 1982	Normal	United States	ISU-Braden Auditorium		
February 7, 1982	Omaha	United States	Omaha Civic Auditorium		
February 9, 1982	Denver	United States	Denver Auditorium		
February 11, 1982	San Diego	United States	San Diego Golden Hall		
February 12, 1982	Santa Monica	United States	Santa Monica Civic Auditorium		
February 13, 1982	San Bernardino	United States	Orange Pavilion		
February 14, 1982	San Francisco	United States	Bill Graham Civic Auditorium		
February 15, 1982	San Francisco	United States	Bill Graham Civic Auditorium		
February 18, 1982	Kansas City	United States	Uptown Theater		
February 19, 1982	Martin	United States	UT-Martin Fieldhouse		
February 20, 1982	Birmingham	United States	Birmingham–Jefferson Civic Center		
February 21, 1982	Indianapolis	United States	Indiana Convention Center		
February 24, 1982	Memphis	United States	Mid-South Coliseum		
February 25, 1982	Monroe	United States	Monroe Civic Center		
February 26, 1982	Augusta	United States	Augusta Civic Center		
February 27, 1982	Montgomery	United States	Garrett Coliseum		
February 28, 1982	New Orleans	United States	Saenger Theatre		
March 3, 1982	Boston	United States	Orpheum Theatre		
March 5, 1982	Rockford	United States	Rockford MetroCentre		
March 6, 1982	Davenport	United States	Palmer Auditorium		
March 7, 1982	Bloomington	United States	Met Center		
March 11, 1982	Hampton	United States	Hampton Coliseum		
March 12, 1982	Raleigh	United States	Dorton Arena		
March 13, 1982	Upper Darby Township	United States	Tower Theater		
March 14, 1982	Cincinnati	United States	Riverfront Coliseum		

== The band ==
- Prince: Lead vocals, Synthesizer and guitar
- Dez Dickerson: Guitar
- Brown Mark: Bass
- Matt Fink: Keyboards
- Lisa Coleman: Keyboards
- Bobby Z.: Drums
