= 1999 (Prince album) =

Studio album by Prince
- Released: October 27, 1982
- Recorded: January–August 1982
- Studios: Kiowa Trail Home Studio (Chanhassen, Minnesota); Sunset Sound Recorders (Hollywood, California)
- Genres: Minneapolis sound; synth-funk; synth-pop; R&B; dance; new wave; art pop
- Length: 70:29
- Label: Warner Bros.
- Producer: Prince

Prince chronology
| Controversy (1981) | 1999 (1982) | Purple Rain (1984) |

Singles from 1999
- 1. "1999" Released: September 24, 1982; 2. "Little Red Corvette" Released: February 9, 1983; 3. "Delirious" Released: August 17, 1983; 4. "Let's Pretend We're Married" Released: November 23, 1983

1999 is the fifth studio album by the American singer-songwriter and musician Prince, released on October 27, 1982, by Warner Bros. Records. It was released as a double album and was his first to be recorded with his band the Revolution. 1999's critical and commercial success propelled Prince to a place in the public psyche and marked the beginning of two years of heightened fame via his following releases.

1999 was Prince's first top ten album on the Billboard 200, charting at number nine upon release, and was fifth in the Billboard Year-End Albums of 1983. "1999", a protest against nuclear proliferation, was a Billboard Hot 100 top 20 hit, peaking at number 12. It has since become one of Prince's most recognizable compositions. "Delirious" reached number eight on the Billboard Hot 100, while "Little Red Corvette" peaked at number six, becoming Prince's highest charting U.S. single at the time. "International Lover" was also nominated for Best Male R&B Vocal Performance at the 26th Grammy Awards, which was Prince's first Grammy Award nomination.

1999 received widespread acclaim from critics, and was seen as Prince's breakthrough album. On March 24, 1999, 1999 was certified quadruple platinum by the Recording Industry Association of America (RIAA). Following Prince's death in 2016, the album re-entered the Billboard 200 and peaked at number seven, besting its original performance on the chart 33 years earlier. A re-release and remaster of the album, including 35 previously unreleased recordings, was released in November 2019.

1999 has been ranked as one of the greatest albums of all time by several publications and organizations. The music videos for both "1999" and "Little Red Corvette" received heavy rotation on MTV, making Prince one of the first Black artists to be prominently featured on the television channel. According to the Rolling Stone Album Guide (2004), "1999 may be Prince's most influential album: Its synth-and-drum machine-heavy arrangements codified the Minneapolis sound that loomed over mid-'80s R&B and pop, not to mention the next two decades' worth of electro, house, and techno." It is also included on Rolling Stone's 500 Greatest Albums of All Time. In 2008, the album was inducted into the Grammy Hall of Fame.

== Music ==
The album's instrumentation found Prince fully embracing the gadgetry and sounds of emergent electro-funk and 1980s sequencing technology, prominently featuring the use of synthesizers and drum machine, namely the Linn LM-1 drum machine.

The album's opening title track, "1999", was also its first single and initially peaked at 44 on the U.S. Billboard Hot 100. It was subsequently re-released following the huge success of its follow-up single and 1999's second track, "Little Red Corvette", which peaked at number six on the U.S. Billboard Hot 100. Lisa Coleman–who sang on the album–recalled how Prince came up with "Little Red Corvette" after sleeping in her pink Mercury Montclair Maurauder. Shortly after being reissued, "1999" reached number 12, and subsequently became one of Prince's most recognizable compositions.

The music videos for both "1999" and "Little Red Corvette" were significant as two of the first videos by a black artist to receive heavy rotation on the newly launched music video channel, MTV, after controversy over its failure to promote Black performers. The two tracks were later combined as a double A-side single in the United Kingdom, where it peaked at number two. A subsequent single from the album and its third chronological track, the rockabilly-influenced "Delirious", still managed top ten status in the United States at number eight, but a fourth, the double-sided single "Let's Pretend We're Married"/"Irresistible Bitch", got no further than number 52.

While "Little Red Corvette" helped Prince cross over to the wider rock audience, the rest of 1999 retains the funk elements featured in previous albums and is dominated by the use of synthesizers and drum machines. The album is, however, notable within Prince's catalogue for its wide variety of themes in addition to the sexual imagery which had already become something of a trademark on his previous work. "Automatic", extending to almost ten minutes, starts side three of the album with a prominent synthesizer melody and bondage-inspired lyrical imagery which, transplanted to the music video for the track (with a scene that depicted Prince being tied up and whipped by band-members Lisa Coleman and Jill Jones), had been deemed too sexual for MTV in 1983.

"Something in the Water (Does Not Compute)", an ode to a harsh lover, is the centerpiece of a preoccupation with Computer Age themes that would continue into future albums. This is also reflected in various tracks like "Let's Pretend We're Married" and "All the Critics Love U in New York", songs that widen his use of synthesizers and drum machine. 1999 also contains two ballads in "Free", a piano piece encouraging people to count their blessings and be thankful for what they have, and "International Lover", a slow-paced love song for which Prince received his first Grammy Award nomination in 1984 under the category of Best Male R&B Vocal Performance.

"1999" has been described as a work of Minneapolis sound, funk, synth-pop, R&B, dance, new wave and art pop.

== Release ==
1999 was released on October 27, 1982, by Warner Bros. Records. It was the fifth album released by Prince. 1999 was Prince's first top 10 album on the Billboard 200, peaking at number nine. It was fifth in the Billboard Year-End Albums of 1983. Following Prince's death in 2016, the album re-entered the Billboard 200 and peaked at number seven, besting its original performance on the chart 33 years earlier. It also peaked in the top ten in New Zealand, reaching number six on the New Zealand Albums Chart in 1982.

=== Remastered, Deluxe and Super Deluxe re-issues ===
The album was released as a Remastered, Deluxe and Super Deluxe edition on November 29, 2019. The most elaborate re-issue contains five CDs featuring previously unreleased tracks, and a live DVD, with a total running time of 5 hours and 53 minutes. It reached the top 20 of the charts in Belgium, the Netherlands and Hungary.

== Reception and legacy ==
Professional ratings
Aggregate scores
| Source | Rating |
|---|---|
| Metacritic | 100/100 (2019 edition) |
Review scores
| Source | Rating |
| AllMusic | 5/5 stars |
| Blender | 4/5 stars |
| Chicago Sun-Times | 4/4 stars |
| Entertainment Weekly | A− |
| The Guardian | 5/5 stars |
| Pitchfork | 10/10 |
| Rolling Stone | 4/5 stars |
| The Rolling Stone Album Guide | 4.5/5 stars |
| Spin Alternative Record Guide | 8/10 |
| The Village Voice | A− |

1999 was well received by contemporary critics. Reviewing for Rolling Stone in December 1982, Michael Hill praised Prince for "working like a colorblind technician who's studied both Devo and Afrika Bambaataa and the Soulsonic Force, keeping the [1999's] songs constantly kinetic with an inventive series of shocks and surprises." The Village Voice reviewer Robert Christgau was more reserved in his praise. While conceding that, "like every black pop auteur, Prince commands his own personal groove ... stretching his flat funk forcebeat onto two discs worth of deeply useful dance tracks", he also believed that the musician's only reliable subject remains race, leaving him with doubts about the messages behind the sex and apocalyptic songs.

Retrospective appraisals have been even more favorable. According to The New Rolling Stone Album Guide (2004), "1999 may be Prince's most influential album: Its synth-and-drum machine-heavy arrangements codified the Minneapolis sound that loomed over mid-'80s R&B and pop, not to mention the next two decades' worth of electro, house, and techno." Paul A. Thompson of Pitchfork noted the way Prince "marshal[led] the Reagan years and the LM-1 for his own purposes" has rarely been replicated and called 1999 a "rare record that has come to define its era while also existing outside of it, a masterpiece that immediately precedes the albums Prince fashioned, conspicuously, as masterpieces." Thompson also described the album as a "computer breathing." Also for Pitchfork in 2016, Maura Johnston wrote that through the "balancing synth-funk explorations... taut pop construction, genre-bending, and the proto-nuclear fallout of lust, 1999 still sounds like a landmark release in 2016". Johnston further praised Prince's "singular vision and willingness to indulge his curiosities" for creating an "apocalypse-anticipating album that, perhaps paradoxically, was built to last for decades and even centuries to come." Writing for Slant Magazine, Eric Henderson called 1999 a "massive, sexy, rump-shaking, and sometimes even disturbing masterpiece" and stated that even though it may not be better than Dirty Mind, Purple Rain, and Sign o' the Times, the album represented a "quantum leap in sophistication and scope." Henderson also claimed that 1999 raised the bar for '80s funk.

1999 has appeared on professional listings of the greatest albums. In 1989, Rolling Stone ranked 1999 16th on its list of the 100 Greatest Albums of the 1980s. In 2003, VH1 placed 1999 number 48 in its list of the 100 Greatest Albums. The album was also part of Slant Magazine's list The 50 Most Essential Pop Albums and the magazine listed the album at number eight on its list of Best Albums of the 1980s. In 2003, the album was ranked number 163 on Rolling Stone magazine's list of The 500 Greatest Albums of All Time. It maintained the rating in a 2012 revised list, and was re-ranked number 130 in 2020. The album was also included in the book 1001 Albums You Must Hear Before You Die. The album was inducted into the Grammy Hall of Fame in 2008.

== Track listing ==
=== Original album ===
All tracks are written by Prince.

Side one
| No. | Title | Length |
|---|---|---|
| 1. | "1999" | 6:15 |
| 2. | "Little Red Corvette" | 5:03 |
| 3. | "Delirious" | 4:00 |
| Total length: | | 15:18 |

Side two
| No. | Title | Length |
|---|---|---|
| 4. | "Let's Pretend We're Married" | 7:21 |
| 5. | "D.M.S.R." | 8:17 |
| Total length: | | 15:38 |

Side three
| No. | Title | Length |
|---|---|---|
| 6. | "Automatic" | 9:28 |
| 7. | "Something in the Water (Does Not Compute)" | 4:02 |
| 8. | "Free" | 5:08 |
| Total length: | | 18:38 |

Side four
| No. | Title | Length |
|---|---|---|
| 9. | "Lady Cab Driver" | 8:19 |
| 10. | "All the Critics Love U in New York" | 5:59 |
| 11. | "International Lover" | 6:37 |
| Total length: | | 20:55 70:29 |

Single LP variant

Side one
| No. | Title | Length |
|---|---|---|
| 1. | "1999" | 6:15 |
| 2. | "Little Red Corvette" | 5:03 |
| 3. | "Delirious" | 4:00 |
| 4. | "Free" | 5:08 |
| Total length: | | 20:26 |

Side two
| No. | Title | Length |
|---|---|---|
| 5. | "Let's Pretend We're Married" | 7:21 |
| 6. | "Something in the Water (Does Not Compute)" | 4:02 |
| 7. | "Lady Cab Driver" | 8:19 |
| Total length: | | 19:42 40:08 |

Notes

- Originally released on vinyl as a double LP (the first of a number of double sets from Prince), 1999 was cut to a single vinyl edition in some countries, omitting "D.M.S.R.", "Automatic", "All the Critics Love U in New York" and "International Lover"; the single LP variant was reissued as part of Record Store Day 2018.
- The original CD version of the album was also cut, omitting "D.M.S.R." There is a notice on the back cover of the original compact disc pressing that reads "To enable the release of 1999 as a single compact disc, the song 'D.M.S.R.' has been omitted from the original LP edition." Later compact disc pressings (from a 1990 reissue onward) included the track.
- On the cassette release, "Free" was placed after "D.M.S.R." to end the first side, balancing out the lengths of both sides of the cassette.

=== Remastered, deluxe and super deluxe editions ===
The Remastered edition contains a remaster of the original album. The Deluxe edition contains the remaster and a bonus disc with all the single, maxi-single and promo mixes as well as the B-sides. The Super Deluxe edition contains four more discs: Two of them contain 24 previously unissued studio tracks, the third contains a complete live audio performance of the 1999 Tour recorded at the late show (the second of two that day) in Detroit, Michigan, on November 30, 1982, and a DVD with another complete, previously unreleased concert from the 1999 Tour, recorded in multi-cam live at The Summit in Houston, Texas on December 29, 1982. The albums were also issued on vinyl in a 2 LP, 4 LP and 10 LP + DVD set. The Super Deluxe edition and the Deluxe edition are both completely out of print physically.

Disc 2: Promo Mixes & B-Sides
| No. | Title | Length |
|---|---|---|
| 1. | "1999" (7" Stereo Edit) | 3:37 |
| 2. | "1999" (7" Mono Promo-Only Edit) | 3:35 |
| 3. | "Free" (Promo-Only Edit) | 4:36 |
| 4. | "How Come U Don't Call Me Anymore?" ("1999" B-Side) | 3:55 |
| 5. | "Little Red Corvette" (7" Edit) | 3:08 |
| 6. | "All the Critics Love U In New York" (7" Edit) | 3:16 |
| 7. | "Lady Cab Driver" (7" Edit) | 5:06 |
| 8. | "Little Red Corvette" (Dance Remix Promo-Only Edit) | 4:34 |
| 9. | "Little Red Corvette" (Special Dance Mix) | 8:31 |
| 10. | "Delirious" (7" Edit) | 2:39 |
| 11. | "Horny Toad" ("Delirious" B-Side) | 2:13 |
| 12. | "Automatic" (7" Edit) | 3:40 |
| 13. | "Automatic" (Video Version) | 8:21 |
| 14. | "Let's Pretend We're Married" (7" Edit) | 3:45 |
| 15. | "Let's Pretend We're Married" (7" Mono Promo-Only Edit) | 3:44 |
| 16. | "Irresistible Bitch" ("Let's Pretend We're Married" B-Side) | 4:14 |
| 17. | "Let's Pretend We're Married" (Video Version) | 4:03 |
| 18. | "D.M.S.R." (Edit) | 5:06 |

Disc 3: Vault Tracks I
| No. | Title | Length |
|---|---|---|
| 1. | "Feel U Up" | 6:42 |
| 2. | "Irresistible Bitch" | 4:39 |
| 3. | "Money Don't Grow on Trees" | 4:19 |
| 4. | "Vagina" | 3:28 |
| 5. | "Rearrange" | 6:11 |
| 6. | "Bold Generation" | 5:54 |
| 7. | "Colleen" | 5:30 |
| 8. | "International Lover" (Take 1, Live in Studio) | 7:20 |
| 9. | "Turn It Up" | 5:23 |
| 10. | "You're All I Want" | 3:00 |
| 11. | "Something in the Water (Does Not Compute)" (Original Version) | 4:00 |
| 12. | "If It'll Make U Happy" | 4:12 |
| 13. | "How Come U Don't Call Me Anymore?" (Take 2, Live in Studio) | 6:11 |

Disc 4: Vault Tracks II
| No. | Title | Length |
|---|---|---|
| 1. | "Possessed" (1982 version) | 8:47 |
| 2. | "Delirious" (Full-Length) | 6:00 |
| 3. | "Purple Music" | 10:58 |
| 4. | "Yah, You Know" | 3:11 |
| 5. | "Moonbeam Levels" (previously released on the 2016 compilation 4Ever) | 4:23 |
| 6. | "No Call U" | 4:30 |
| 7. | "Can't Stop This Feeling I Got" | 2:40 |
| 8. | "Do Yourself a Favor" (written by Pepé Willie and Jesse Johnson) | 9:01 |
| 9. | "Don't Let Him Fool Ya" | 4:35 |
| 10. | "Teacher, Teacher" | 3:37 |
| 11. | "Lady Cab Driver / I Wanna Be Your Lover / Head / Little Red Corvette" (Tour Demo) | 7:00 |

Disc 5: Live in Detroit 11/30/82
| No. | Title | Length |
|---|---|---|
| 1. | "Controversy" | 5:41 |
| 2. | "Let's Work" | 5:27 |
| 3. | "Little Red Corvette" | 4:18 |
| 4. | "Do Me, Baby" | 7:18 |
| 5. | "Head" | 4:13 |
| 6. | "Uptown" | 2:55 |
| 7. | "Interlude" | 2:15 |
| 8. | "How Come U Don't Call Me Anymore?" | 7:03 |
| 9. | "Automatic" | 7:02 |
| 10. | "International Lover" | 8:41 |
| 11. | "1999" | 10:25 |
| 12. | "D.M.S.R." | 8:03 |

Disc 6 (DVD): Live in Houston 12/29/82
| No. | Title | Length |
|---|---|---|
| 1. | "Controversy" | 5:01 |
| 2. | "Let's Work" | 5:24 |
| 3. | "Do Me, Baby" | 6:21 |
| 4. | "D.M.S.R." | 4:28 |
| 5. | "Interlude" | 3:35 |
| 6. | "Piano Improvisation" (Contains Elements of "With You") | 1:38 |
| 7. | "How Come U Don't Call Me Anymore?" | 8:18 |
| 8. | "Lady Cab Driver" | 3:30 |
| 9. | "Automatic" | 5:47 |
| 10. | "International Lover" | 9:52 |
| 11. | "1999" | 8:09 |
| 12. | "Head" (Contains Elements of "Sexuality") | 5:54 |

== Personnel ==
Credits adapted from Jake Brown, Benoît Clerc, Reverb, the Super Deluxe booklet, and Guitarcloud.

=== Musicians ===
- Prince – lead and backing vocals (all tracks), electric guitar (tracks 1–3, 5–6, 8–11), bass (tracks 1–6, 8–11), Steinway piano (track 8), synthesizers (tracks 2, 4, 6, 8–10), ARP Omni (track 1), Oberheim OB-SX (track 7), Oberheim OB-X (tracks 1, 11), Oberheim OB-Xa (track 3), Oberheim OB-8 (track 5), Linn LM-1 (tracks 1–10), drums (tracks 1, 9, 11 (possible)), claps (tracks 1, 5), Pearl SY-1 Syncussion (tracks 1–2, 4), finger snaps (track 11)
- Lisa Coleman – co-lead vocals (track 1), backing vocals (tracks 1–3, 5–6, 8), claps (track 5)
- Dez Dickerson – co-lead vocals (track 1), backing vocals (tracks 1–2, 5), electric guitar solo (track 2), claps (track 5)
- Jesse Johnson – backing vocals (track 1)
- Jill Jones – co-lead vocals (track 1), backing vocals (tracks 1, 6, 8), moans (track 9), claps (track 6)
- Bobby Z. – electronic percussion (tracks 1, 5), cymbals (track 5)
- Brownmark, The Count, Peggy McCreary, Carol McGovney, Poochie, Jamie Shoop – backing vocals (track 5), claps (track 5)
- Wendy Melvoin, Vanity – backing vocals (track 8)
- Morris Day – drums (track 11 (possible))

=== Production ===
- Prince – producer
- Don Batts – engineer (tracks 1–2, 7)
- David Leonard, Peggy McCreary – mixing, engineers
- Bernie Grundman – mastering (A&M Records)

While not performance credited for the studio recordings, band members Doctor Fink (keyboards), Bobby Z. (drums) and Brown Mark (bass) do appear in the music videos.

== Singles ==
- "1999" (No. 12 US, No. 4 US R&B, No. 25 UK)
1. "1999"
2. "How Come U Don't Call Me Anymore?"
- "Little Red Corvette" (No. 6 US, No. 15 US R&B, No. 54 UK)
1. "Little Red Corvette"
2. "All the Critics Love U in New York"
- "Delirious" (No. 8 US, No. 18 US R&B)
1. "Delirious"
2. "Horny Toad"
- "Automatic" (AUS)
1. "Automatic"
2. "Something in the Water (Does Not Compute)"
- "Let's Pretend We're Married" (No. 52 US, No. 55 US R&B)
1. "Let's Pretend We're Married"
2. "Irresistible Bitch"

== Charts ==
=== Weekly charts ===
==== Original version ====
1982–1985 weekly chart performance for 1999
| Chart (1982) | Position |
|---|---|
| Australian Albums (Kent Music Report) | 35 |
| Canada Top Albums/CDs (RPM) | 23 |
| Dutch Albums (Album Top 100) | 45 |
| New Zealand Albums (RMNZ) | 6 |
| UK Albums (Official Charts) | 30 |
| US Billboard 200 | 9 |
| US Top R&B/Hip-Hop Albums (Billboard) | 4 |

2016 weekly chart performance for 1999
| Chart (2016) | Position |
|---|---|
| Swiss Albums (Schweizer Hitparade) | 51 |
| UK Albums (Official Charts) | 28 |
| US Billboard 200 | 7 |

==== 2019 reissue ====
2019 weekly chart performance for 1999 reissue
| Chart (2019) | Position |
|---|---|
| Austrian Albums (Ö3 Austria) | 72 |
| Belgian Albums (Ultratop Flanders) | 12 |
| Dutch Albums (Album Top 100) | 15 |
| German Albums (Offizielle Top 100) | 37 |
| Hungarian Albums (MAHASZ) | 13 |
| Portuguese Albums (AFP) | 39 |
| UK Albums (Official Charts) | 46 |
| US Billboard 200 | 45 |

=== Year-end charts ===
1983 year-end chart performance for 1999
| Chart (1983) | Position |
|---|---|
| New Zealand Albums (RMNZ) | 24 |
| US Billboard 200 | 5 |
| US Top R&B/Hip-Hop Albums (Billboard) | 4 |

1984 year-end chart performance for 1999
| Chart (1984) | Position |
|---|---|
| US Billboard 200 | 22 |

1985 year-end chart performance for 1999
| Chart (1985) | Position |
|---|---|
| US Billboard 200 | 95 |

2016 year-end chart performance for 1999
| Chart (2016) | Position |
|---|---|
| US Billboard 200 | 200 |

== Certifications ==
Certifications for 1999
| Region | Certification | Certified units/sales |
|---|---|---|
| Canada (Music Canada) | Gold | 50,000^{^} |
| New Zealand (RMNZ) | Gold | 7,500^{^} |
| United Kingdom (BPI) | Platinum | 300,000^{^} |
| United States (RIAA) | 4× Platinum | 4,000,000^{^} |
Summaries
| Worldwide | — | 7,010,000 |
^{^} Shipments figures based on certification alone.
