= 1999 (Prince song) =

1982 single by Prince

- Artwork for US vinyl editions

Single by Prince

from the album 1999
- B-side: "How Come U Don't Call Me Anymore?"
- Released: September 24, 1982
- Recorded: August 7, 1982
- Studio: Kiowa Trail home studio (Chanhassen, Minnesota)
- Genre: Funk; synth-funk; Minneapolis sound; dance-rock; synth-rock
- Length: 3:36 (single version); 6:18 (album version)
- Label: Warner Bros.
- Songwriter: Prince
- Producer: Prince

Prince singles chronology
"Do Me, Baby" (1982)	"1999" (1982)	"Little Red Corvette" (1983)
"The Truth" (1997)	"1999" (1998)	"The Greatest Romance Ever Sold" (1999)

Music video
- "1999" on YouTube

"1999" is a protest song by American musician Prince, the title track from his 1982 album of the same name. Originally peaking at number 44 on the Billboard Hot 100, a mid-1983 re-release later reached number 12 in the US, while a January 1985 rerelease, a double A-side with "Little Red Corvette", later peaked at number 2 on the UK singles chart.

Rolling Stone ranked "1999" number 339 on their list of the 500 Greatest Songs of All Time. Following Prince's death, the song re-charted on the Billboard Hot 100 at number 41, later moving up to number 27, making it the fourth separate time the song had entered the Hot 100 and the third different decade in which the song re-charted (as after its two 1980s entries, it made the chart again on January 16, 1999 at number 40). As of April 30, 2016, it has sold 727,363 copies in the United States.

== Background ==
In a December 1999 interview for Larry King Live, Prince said the inspiration for "1999" was a 1982 TV special about the year 1999 and speculation about what might happen in that year. Prince found it ironic that the people who watched the TV special with him, who he thought were generally optimistic, "were dreading those days". In contrast, he said, "I always knew I'd be cool, I never felt this was going to be a rough time for me", although he also believed there were "going to be rough times" for the planet as a whole, and he "wanted to write something that gave hope".

In a 2019 interview, Bobby Z., the drummer of Prince's backing band the Revolution, explained that they saw the TV special, a documentary about Nostradamus and his predictions of the end of the world, during a hotel stop on the Dirty Mind tour. When the other musicians talked about the haunting film the next day, Prince had already written the song: "We're all going 'Wow' and then he just embodied the whole thing with '1999'".

== Recording ==
The album version of "1999" starts with a slowed-down voice stating "Don't worry, I won't hurt you. I only want you to have some fun." Prince shares lead vocals on the track with members of his band the Revolution, namely Dez Dickerson, Lisa Coleman and Jill Jones. Originally conceived to be a three-part harmony, it was later decided to separate out the voices that started each verse. Distinct scratching and explosion noises heard in the track were to cover mistakes during recording of a good take.

== Reception ==
Billboard said that "the Apocalypse never sounded this danceable before."

Some music critics have suggested Phil Collins' 1985 song "Sussudio" sounds very similar to "1999". Collins confirmed this claim, and remembers listening to "1999" frequently while he was on tour with Genesis.

== Re-release ==
In January 1985, "1999" was released as a 12" single in the US with "Little Red Corvette" as the B-side, and "How Come U Don't Call Me Anymore?"/"D.M.S.R." in the UK. The single peaked at number 2 in its second week of release.

"1999" was re-released in the UK and the US in late 1998 to accompany the song's namesake year. It was released on 12" vinyl with the same track listing as the original 12" single: the album version, along with "How Come U Don't Call Me Anymore?" and "D.M.S.R." A CD single was also issued with the same track listing, except the edit of "1999" was substituted for the album version. It was also re-released again towards the end of its namesake year. Prince also re-recorded the song and released it in 1999 as "1999 (The New Master)". The original version re-charted within the top 40 of the US Billboard Hot 100 in January 1999, achieving a record as the only song named after a year to enter the chart in said corresponding year. Following Prince's death in April 2016, the song also became the first in Billboard's history to reach the top 40 of the Hot 100 in three separate decades.

== Music video ==
The video, directed by Bruce Gowers, was shot during the last week of rehearsals for the 1999 Tour. It depicts Prince and his band during a live performance. Just in time to take his part after Lisa Coleman, Jill Jones and Dez Dickerson, Prince appears on the stage from above, gliding down on a fireman's pole, wearing a glittery purple long coat.

MTV added the video to its rotation on December 16, 1982, at a time when African-American artists struggled to get airplay on the channel. The exposure gave instant credibility to Prince, and is credited with helping the album reach gold status the following month.

M2 notably played this video continuously from midnight Eastern Time on December 31, 1998, to the next midnight on January 1, 1999.

== Track listing ==
- 7"
1. "1999"
2. "How Come U Don't Call Me Anymore?"
- 12" UK
1. "1999"
2. "D.M.S.R."
- 12" West Germany
1. "1999"
2. "Let's Pretend We're Married"
- CD – 1998 re-release
1. "1999"
2. "Uptown"
3. "Controversy"
4. "Dirty Mind"
5. "Sexuality"
- 12" – 1985 re-release
1. "1999"
2. "How Come U Don't Call Me Anymore?"
3. "D.M.S.R."

== Personnel ==
Credits from Guitarcloud and Benoît Clerc

- Prince – lead vocals, ARP Omni-2, Oberheim OB-Xa, electric guitars, bass guitar, Linn LM-1, cymbals, Pearl SY-1 Syncussion, tambourine, handclaps, cowbell
- Lisa Coleman – lead vocals
- Dez Dickerson – lead vocals
- Jill Jones – lead vocals
- Jesse Johnson – backing vocals (uncredited)
- Bobby Z. – Pearl SY-1 Syncussion (uncredited)

== Charts ==
=== First release (1982) ===
1982 weekly chart performance for "1999"
Chart (1982)	Peak position
US Billboard Hot 100	44
US Hot Black Singles (Billboard)	4
US Dance Club Songs (Billboard)	1
US Cash Box Top 100	46

1983 weekly chart performance for "1999"
Chart (1983)	Peak position
Australia (Kent Music Report)	2
Belgium (Ultratop 50 Flanders)	8
Finland (Suomen virallinen lista)	12
Luxembourg (Radio Luxembourg)	10
Netherlands (Dutch Top 40)	13
Netherlands (Single Top 100)	14
Ireland (IRMA)	21
UK Singles (Official Charts)	25

=== US re-release (1983) ===
1983 weekly chart performance for "1999" US re-release
Chart (1983)	Peak position
Canada (CHUM)	8
Canada Top Singles (RPM)	9
New Zealand (Recorded Music NZ)	4
US Billboard Hot 100	12
US Cash Box Top 100	14

=== UK re-release (1985) ===
1985 weekly chart performance for "1999" UK re-release
Chart (1985)	Peak position
Ireland (IRMA)	3
Luxembourg (Radio Luxembourg)	1
UK Singles (Official Charts)	2

=== Worldwide re-release (1998/1999) ===
1999 weekly chart performance for "1999"
Chart (1999)	Peak position
Australia (ARIA)	47
Belgium (Ultratop 50 Flanders)	29
Netherlands (Dutch Top 40)	16
Netherlands (Single Top 100)	31
Germany (GfK)	86
Ireland (IRMA)	18
UK Singles (Official Charts)	10
UK Airplay (Music Week)	20
US Billboard Hot 100	40
US Adult Pop Airplay (Billboard)	33
US Pop Airplay (Billboard)	36
US R&B/Hip-Hop Airplay (Billboard)	38
US Rhythmic Airplay (Billboard)	13

2016 weekly chart performance for "1999"
Chart (2016)	Peak position
Australia (ARIA)	28
France (SNEP)	32
Germany (GfK)	75
UK Singles (Official Charts)	49
US Billboard Hot 100	27
US Digital Song Sales (Billboard)	6
US Hot R&B Songs (Billboard)	11
US R&B/Hip-Hop Digital Songs (Billboard)	6

=== Year-end charts ===
1983 year-end chart performance for "1999"
Chart (1983)	Position
Australia (Kent Music Report)	16
Canada Top Singles (RPM)	71
New Zealand (Recorded Music NZ)	37
US Billboard Hot 100	41

1985 year-end chart performance for "1999"
Chart (1985)	Position
UK Singles (OCC)	30

1999 year-end chart performance for "1999"
Chart (1999)	Position
Netherlands (Dutch Top 40)	166

== Certifications and sales ==
Certifications and sales for "1999"
Region	Certification	Certified units/sales
New Zealand (RMNZ)	Platinum	30,000^{‡}
United Kingdom (BPI)	Gold	400,000^{‡}
United States	—	727,363
^{‡} Sales+streaming figures based on certification alone.

== See also ==
- List of number-one dance singles of 1982 (U.S.)
