= Gotta Stop (Messin' About) =

- UK 12" single cover

Single by Prince
- B-side: "Uptown" (first release); "I Wanna Be Your Lover" (re-release); "Head" (12"); "Partyup (Edit)", "When You Were Mine" (US promo)
- Released: May 29, 1981
- Recorded: Minneapolis, May–June, 1980
- Genre: Funk
- Length: 2:57
- Label: Warner Bros.
- Songwriter: Prince
- Producer: Prince

Prince singles chronology
"Do It All Night" (1981)	"Gotta Stop (Messin' About)" (1981)	"Controversy" (1981)

"Gotta Stop (Messin' About)" is a song by Prince, released in the UK as a follow-up single to support his third album, Dirty Mind. The single was not an album track, though it was written at the same time, and possessed a similar sound. "Gotta Stop Messin' About" marked the first time Prince released non-album tracks, which, especially as B-sides, would become a prominent part of his career.

The song is keyboard dominated, and the lyrics speak of a woman who's constantly "messin' about" with other men. The song contains familiar Prince themes of sexual frustration, masturbation and sexual metaphors. The track consists of two verses and multiple repeats of the chorus. It was played live on the Dirty Mind Tour with an extended instrumental section at the end.

"Gotta Stop (Messin' About)" was released in the UK as two separate 7" singles, one with the Dirty Mind track "Uptown" as a B-side, and the other with "I Wanna Be Your Lover", from Prince. Each single also had an accompanying 12" single, both with the same tracks as the 7" and both including the song "Head", from Dirty Mind. Despite an extensive advertising campaign and promotion, and coinciding with Prince's first UK gig, neither issue of the single charted on the Official Singles Chart and only reached #130 on the Record Business chart. The track would later be released in the U.S. as the B-side of the 12" single for "Let's Work", and become a highly sought-after collector's item. "Gotta Stop (Messin' About)" was also later released on The Hits/The B-Sides and Prince 4Ever.

The song was covered by the American alternative pop rock band Self sometime in 2003, and released alongside a multitude of other cut tracks from their (at the time) shelved album Ornament & Crime in 2004, before being featured on their 2005 compilation album Porno, Mint & Grime.

== Personnel ==
Credits from Benoît Clerc and Guitarcloud.

- Prince – lead and backing vocals, electric guitars, Oberheim OB-X, bass guitar, drums, handclaps
