= Do It All Night =

Do It All Night may refer to:

- "Do It All Night" (Prince song), a 1981 song by Prince
- Do It All Night (album), a 1978 album by Curtis Mayfield, or the title song
