= Do It All Night (Prince song) =

- UK 7" single cover

Single by Prince

from the album Dirty Mind
- B-side: "Head"
- Released: March 6, 1981
- Recorded: Minneapolis, May–June, 1980
- Genre: Funk
- Length: 3:42
- Label: Warner Bros.
- Songwriter: Prince
- Producer: Prince

Prince singles chronology
"Dirty Mind" (1980)	"Do It All Night" (1981)	"Gotta Stop (Messin' About)" (1981)

"Do It All Night" was the lead single in the UK to support Prince's third album, Dirty Mind. The song is an ode to sex, and Prince exclaims that he wants to do it all night. The song opens with a simple keyboard hook before a prominent bass guitar kicks in, along with rhythm guitar and live drums. The song consists of two verses and several repeats of the chorus. Also featured is a keyboard solo in the bridge. The song opened Prince's Dirty Mind tour. The B-side of the track was the controversial Dirty Mind ode to oral sex, "Head".

== Personnel ==
Credits from Benoît Clerc and Guitarcloud.

- Prince – lead and backing vocals, Yamaha CP-70 electric grand piano, ARP Omni, Oberheim OB-X, electric guitar, bass guitar, drums
