= When You Were Mine (Prince song) =

1980 promotional single by Prince

Promotional single by Prince

from the album Dirty Mind
- B-side: "Gotta Broken Heart Again" "Uptown"
- Released: October 8, 1980
- Recorded: May–June 1980
- Genre: New wave; power pop; jangle pop; pop rock
- Length: 3:47
- Label: Warner Bros.
- Songwriter(s): Prince
- Producer(s): Prince

"When You Were Mine" is a song written and released by Prince on his 1980 album, Dirty Mind. Though not released as a single, the song received a promotional 12" release (which included "Gotta Broken Heart Again" and "Uptown"). "When You Were Mine" was later the B-side for Prince's "Controversy" single in 1981.

A live recording was included on his live album One Nite Alone... Live! (2002). The original studio version was also included on The Hits/The B-Sides in 1993. The track includes a Farfisa-inspired organ sound played on an Oberheim OB-X.

== Personnel ==
Credits from Benoît Clerc and Guitarcloud

- Prince – lead and backing vocals, Oberheim OB-X, ARP Omni, electric guitar, bass guitar, drums

== Mitch Ryder version ==
In 1983, Mitch Ryder released a version of the song on the John Mellencamp-produced album Never Kick a Sleeping Dog. The song peaked at number 87 on the U.S. Billboard Hot 100 during the week ending July 30, 1983, the highest-charting position in the U.S. of any recording of the song, according to the book Joel Whitburn's Billboard Hot 100 Charts. Ryder's version was also featured in the soundtrack of the 1983 film Hot Dog...The Movie.

== Cyndi Lauper version ==
"When You Were Mine"

Single by Cyndi Lauper

from the album She's So Unusual
- B-side: "Yeah Yeah" "I'll Kiss You"
- Released: April 21, 1984
- Recorded: July 1983
- Studio: The Record Plant (New York City)
- Genre: Pop; funk
- Length: 5:06
- Label: Epic
- Songwriter(s): Prince
- Producer(s): Rick Chertoff

Cyndi Lauper singles chronology
"Money Changes Everything" (1984)	"When You Were Mine" (1984)	"The Goonies 'R' Good Enough" (1985)

Cyndi Lauper released a mid-tempo, synthesizer-based version of "When You Were Mine" for her 1983 debut album, She's So Unusual. She performed the single at the 1985 American Music Awards. It was released exclusively as a promotional single in the United States and received a commercial release in Canada and Japan.

The single debuted on the Canadian RPM Top 100 singles chart dated April 27, 1985, at number 91. It peaked at number 62 in its sixth week on the chart. The single spent a total of nine weeks on the chart.

The song was used as the theme song to the second season of the American true crime anthology television series, Dirty John: The Betty Broderick Story.

=== Track listing ===
Canada 7" single

1. "When You Were Mine" (single version) – 4:00
2. "Yeah Yeah" – 3:17

Japan 7" single

1. "When You Were Mine"
2. "I'll Kiss You"

=== Charts ===
Chart performance for "When You Were Mine" by Cyndi Lauper
Chart (1985)	Peak position
Canadian Singles Chart	62
