= Let's Work =

- US 7" single

Single by Prince

from the album Controversy
- B-side: "Ronnie, Talk to Russia"; "Gotta Stop (Messin' About)" (US 12")
- Released: January 6, 1982
- Recorded: 1981
- Studio: Kiowa Trail home studio (Chanhassen, Minnesota); Hollywood Sound (Hollywood, California); Sunset Sound (Hollywood, California)
- Genre: Funk; post-disco
- Length: 2:56 (7" edit); 3:57 (album version); 8:02 (12" version)
- Label: Warner Bros.
- Songwriter: Prince
- Producer: Prince

Prince singles chronology
"Sexuality" (1981)	"Let's Work" (1982)	"Do Me, Baby" (1982)

"Let's Work" is a song by the American singer-songwriter and musician Prince, released as the second single from his 1981 album Controversy. The song originates from a dance called "the Rock" that local kids were doing at the time in Minneapolis. Prince responded quickly with a track called "Let's Rock", and wished to quickly release it as a single. Warner Bros. refused, and a disappointed Prince did not include the song on Controversy, saying the phase had passed. Instead, the song was updated with new lyrics and possibly new music and became "Let's Work"—one of his most popular dance numbers.

== Background ==
The song is based on a funky bass line and features a shouted title throughout the song and relies heavily on keyboards to create a sexy groove in the verses and quick solos for the choruses. The lyrics are a tease, equating "working" with having sex. The song was backed with "Ronnie, Talk to Russia", which precedes it on the Controversy album.

The extended remix features instrumental solos; Morris Day on drums; samples from "Controversy" and "Annie Christian", two other songs from the same album; and additional, more insistent lyrics. Prince performed the extended version in concert during the Controversy and 1999 tours. This is the first US Prince single to include a non-album B-side (although it was previously released as a single in the UK). "Gotta Stop (Messin' About)" was written on the Dirty Mind tour, and is consistent with the minimalist demo-like quality of that album.

== Critical reception ==
Daphne A. Brooks of Pitchfork called the song "an exquisite, mid-tempo dance track with a sinuously insistent bass line that fuels the electric slide togetherness of the party." Stephen Holden of Rolling Stone also described "Let's Work" as "a bright and squeaky dance song".

Cashbox said "Undoubtedly, this will get a good workout in the clubs and on B/C lists, and crossover is a strong possibility."

== Personnel ==
Credits sourced from Benoît Clerc, Guitarcloud, Morris Day and David Ritz.

- Prince – lead and backing vocals, ARP Omni, Oberheim OB-X, electric guitar, bass guitar, drums, handclaps
- Morris Day – drums (extended version)

== Charts ==
Chart performance for "Let's Work"
Chart (1982)	Peak position
US Billboard Bubbling Under Hot 100 Singles	4
US Billboard Hot R&B Singles	9
US Billboard Hot Dance Club Songs	1
