= Bray (musician) =

American musician and singer-songwriter

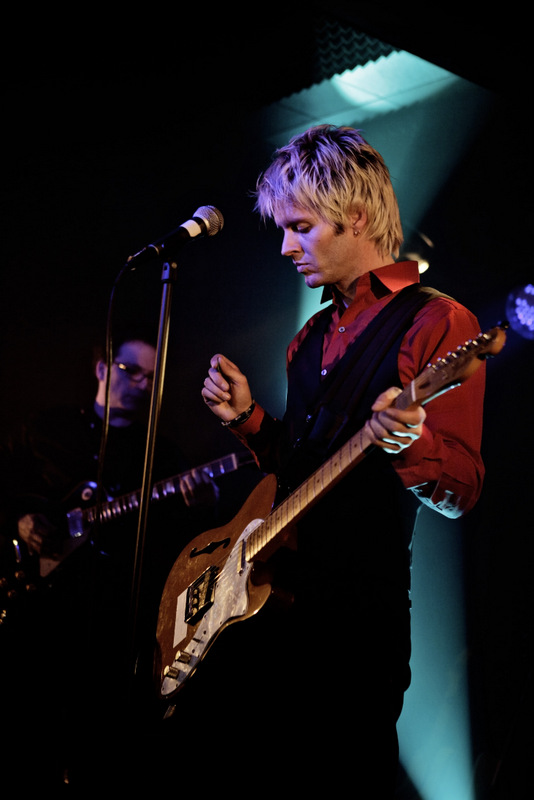
- Bray live at the Rockit Room in San Francisco, California, November 5, 2011.

Background information
- Born: Brayden Gurnari; October 17, 1972 (age 53); Vallejo, California, United States
- Origin: Vallejo, California, United States
- Genres: Rock, pop, electro funk
- Occupations: Singer-songwriter, instrumentalist
- Instruments: Vocals, guitar, bass guitar, keyboards
- Years active: Since 2003; 23 years ago
- Website: braymusic.com

Bray (born Brayden Gurnari, October 17, 1972) is an American musician, singer-songwriter, and stage performer. Active since the early 2000s, his work spans rock, pop, electro-funk, and theatrical performance. He has released multiple studio albums and live recordings and is known for his theatrical, character-driven stage presence.

== Early life and education ==
Bray was born in Vallejo, California. He showed interest in music and performance at a young age and created neighborhood concerts using cardboard guitars.

His musical influences include Prince, David Bowie, and Michael Jackson. In an interview with Rockwired Magazine, Bray also cited Bono (U2) and Radiohead as influences.

Bray attended De La Salle High School in Concord, California. He received a Bachelor of Arts degree in Graphic Design from San Francisco State University in 1996.

== Career ==
=== Career beginnings and early tours (2003–2013) ===
Bray began writing songs in high school, inspired by the Oakland funk scene. In 2003, he released his first album, Independent Film. That same year, he performed at an inauguration-related event for Arnold Schwarzenegger.

In 2004, he was named runner-up in a global online Song of the Year competition. In 2005, his work appeared on the soundtrack of the San Francisco International LGBT Film Festival documentary Blood, Sweat and Glitter. That year, he toured France and performed for over 50,000 people at the San Francisco Pride Parade, opening for En Vogue.

In 2006, Bray performed at the Warfield Theatre in San Francisco at the “All-Star Tribute to San Francisco Music, Past and Future,” alongside members of the Sex Pistols, The Doors, Stone Temple Pilots, and Guns N' Roses. Later that year, he performed at the Festival des Musiques d’ici et d’ailleurs in Châlons-en-Champagne, France.

His second album, Pins and Needles, was released in 2007. Songs from the album appeared on the television series Bad Girls Club. In 2008, he released Live in Germany, recorded at a concert in Schmölln.

In 2009, Bray released @mphibian, produced by Gary St. Clair. The album included keyboard performances by Dr. Fink from Prince and the Revolution.

In 2010, Music Connection magazine named Bray one of the top 100 unsigned artists in the United States. Bray later performed at the Castro Street Fair in San Francisco. Music videos for “Long Gone” (2012) and “Clone Me” (2013) each reached over one million views on YouTube.

=== Music career and continued releases (2014–present) ===
On October 5, 2018, Bray released The Aliens Are Here, his first album in five years and the first credited to Bray and The Dens. In 2018 and 2019, the group toured Europe and performed at the Noorderlicht Festival in the Netherlands.

In 2020, Bray released Stingray with an online concert during the COVID-19 pandemic. The album was produced with Cam Perridge. He also released a one-off single “Wicked Game (Desert Mix),” a cover of the Chris Isaak song, featuring a string quartet.

In December 2020, Bray started Moth Tax, an indie punk and new-wave duo with Noelle Gurnari. The project released the EP Untitled on December 25, 2020. Later singles included “Worms” (2024) and “Trophies” (2025).

On October 17, 2025, Bray released The Last Romantic under Bray and The Dens. The album included the single “Dive,” which has received over 250,000 views on YouTube.

=== Theatre and stage work ===
Bray has continued to perform in theatre throughout his career. In April 2017, he co-produced and starred with Adam St. Martin in Dumb and Dumber Live, a stage adaptation of the film Dumb and Dumber. The production debuted at the Dragon Theatre in Redwood City and was later staged at the Lesher Center for the Arts in 2022 and 2024.

In 2022, Bray and Adam St. Martin created Making Faces, a stage tribute to Rowan Atkinson’s physical comedy, which was performed at the Lesher Center for the Arts.

=== Other projects and media ===
Following a private streaming concert meant to connect with fans at the beginning of the COVID-19 pandemic, Bray produced a 100-episode music and comedy variety series, “The SPC Show,” featuring recurring weekly episodes.

In 2021, Bray co-launched The Green Room Music Podcast with guitarist Jeff Suburu, who has performed as a touring musician with Enrique Iglesias and Gwen Stefani. The comedy and music podcast focuses on backstage stories and touring, and has produced over 90 episodes.

Bray continues to perform live. In September 2024, Bray performed with Neon Velvet, opening for Gwen Stefani at a corporate event at Allegiant Stadium in Las Vegas. In August 2025, he performed at Ottawa’s Nostalgia Music Festival as the lead singer of New Moon on Monday, appearing on the same bill as JD Fortune.

== Discography ==
=== Albums ===
- Independent Film (2003)
- Pins and Needles (2007)
- Live in Germany (2008)
- @mphibian (2009)
- The End Is The Beginning (2012)
- The Aliens Are Here (2018)
- Stingray (2020)
- The Last Romantic (2025)

=== Singles ===
- "Dracula" (2007)
- “Wicked Game (Desert Mix)” (2020)
- “Sensational” (2021)

== See also ==
- List of people from California
- List of singer-songwriters
- Music of California
