= Dirty Mind (Prince song) =

- Philippines 7" single

Single by Prince

from the album Dirty Mind
- B-side: "When We're Dancing Close and Slow"
- Released: November 26, 1980
- Recorded: Minneapolis, May–June 1980
- Genre: Funk; new wave
- Length: 3:49 (7" edit); 4:11 (album version)
- Label: Warner Bros.
- Composers: Prince; Doctor Fink
- Lyricist: Prince
- Producer: Prince

Prince singles chronology
| "Uptown" (1980) | "Dirty Mind" (1980) | "Do It All Night" (1981) |

"Dirty Mind" is the title track to Prince's third album, and the follow-up single from that album in the US, released in 1980. The song is built around a keyboard riff created by Doctor Fink, which dominates the song. The demo-like song lacks a chorus, and is a stark departure of the smooth R&B sound of Prince's first two albums. The lyrics concern sexual thoughts, which are fairly representative of the other songs from the album. The single's B-side is the ballad "When We're Dancing Close and Slow", from the previous year's Prince. "Dirty Mind" reached number sixty-five on the soul chart. Along with the tracks "Uptown" and "Head", "Dirty Mind" reached number five on the dance chart.

== Track listing ==
1. "Dirty Mind" (7" edit) – 3:49
2. "When We're Dancing Close and Slow" – 5:18

== Personnel ==
Credits sourced from Benoît Clerc and Guitarcloud.

- Prince – lead and backing vocals, Oberheim OB-X, electric guitar, bass guitar, drums, electronic percussion
- Dr. Fink – ARP Omni
