= Partyup =

1980 song by Prince

Song by Prince

from the album Dirty Mind
- Released: October 8, 1980
- Recorded: May–June 1980
- Genre: Funk rock; post-disco
- Length: 4:24
- Label: Warner Bros.
- Composers: Prince; Morris Day
- Lyricist: Prince
- Producer: Prince

"Partyup" is a song performed by Prince on his 1980 album, Dirty Mind. It was based on a groove that had been created by his friend Morris Day, who would eventually become the lead singer of The Time.

== Background ==
In a rare February 1981 interview with NME, Prince described the inspiration behind the track:

I was in a lot of different situations when I was coming up to make that record...A lot of anger came up through the songs. It was kind of a rough time. There were a few anti-draft demonstrations going or that I was involved in that spurred me to write "Partyup." Really, that song is just about people who'd rather have a good time than go and shoot up one another. That's all - it's pretty basic. I just seem to read about a lot of politicians who're all going to die soon and I guess they want to go out heavy, because they're prepared to make a few mistakes and end up starting a war that they don't have to go out and fight. I just think the people should have a little more to say in some of these foreign matters. I don't want to have to go out and die for their mistakes.

The origins of the track musically can be traced back to a groove that had been created by one of his friends, Morris Day, who had returned to Minneapolis after brief stints living in Maryland and California. The bass guitar riff and drum track had already been completed by Day before Prince overheard the groove. Morris would further elaborate on the collaboration between the two:

He knew I was back in town. We started hanging out again. I started playing drums on a lot of tracks. We were jamming a lot, writing stuff together. He told me, "You can use my studio to put your own thing together." Well, the first thing that I started to cut was "Partyup." It was a lot slower and funkier, but he liked it and he wanted it. It was just a bass and drum track at that point, but he wanted it. So he said, "I’ll offer you money, or I’ll help you get your record deal." I said, "I’ll take the record deal."

This deal would ultimately result in Prince being credited as the sole writer of "Partyup" on initial releases, as well as the creation of The Time, with Day placed as lead singer of the group. However, despite this unforgettable opportunity, Day also recalled not liking what Prince did to the track, which was entirely re-recorded by Prince:

You know what? I didn't like it as much as the direction I was going in. He kind of took it to a funk-rock kind of thing. That's when he was in his whole Dirty Mind state of mind. My approach was a lot funkier. I was a funkateer back then; I didn't want to hear anything if it wasn't funky.

== SNL performance ==
On February 21, 1981, Prince and his backing band performed "Partyup" in an appearance on Saturday Night Live during the show's infamous 1980–1981 season. The performance was Prince's first on the show, and one of the first performances that he had ever done on live television. In the performance, he managed to sing the song's original lyrics, which included "Fightin' war is such a fuckin' bore, party up". This led to some confusion as to whether or not he had actually said "fuck" on live television, with censor William Clotworthy shrugging it off as Prince saying "friggin'".

That same night, SNL star Charles Rocket also used the expletive at the end of the show, albeit more prominently, soon resulting in him and then-executive producer Jean Doumanian getting fired, and causing one of the first major Saturday Night Live controversies.

== Personnel ==
Credits sourced from Benoit Clerc and Guitarcloud

- Prince – lead and backing vocals, electric guitars, Yamaha CP-70 electric grand piano, Oberheim OB-X, bass guitar, drums, tambourine, handclaps
