= Moonbeam Levels =

Song by Prince

from the album 4Ever
- Language: English
- Released: November 26, 2016
- Recorded: July 6, 1982; June 8, 1983
- Studio: Sunset Sound Recorders, Los Angeles
- Genre: Rock
- Length: 4:23
- Label: Warner
- Songwriter: Prince
- Producer: Prince

"Moonbeam Levels" is a song by American musician Prince from the album 4Ever. It was the first Prince track to be officially released posthumously, and was an outtake from the 1999 sessions, with minor editing done just prior to the Purple Rain sessions.

== Background ==
In 1982, during the last set of sessions held for Prince's 1982 album 1999, Prince recorded the track for the album. The track, which features emotional subjects such as death and nuclear war, was ultimately excluded from the album. After the release of 1999, he kept the track in the vault until 1983, when he took it back out and decided to shorten the ending and possibly consider it for Purple Rain. Prince's engineer Susan Rogers commented on the track and his decision to pull it:

Occasionally, when we were sequencing records, we would put that song into the sequence. I'd think "At last! I'm so happy, this beautiful song is going on this record", but he would pull it. He'd always pull it.

Rogers would further elaborate just how often the track, which was one of her favorites, would show up on configurations of several of his albums:

Songs were chosen to complement the seed, and great songs were rejected. One of my favorite songs of his is called "Moonbeam Levels." He recorded it before I joined him... We sequenced it on Purple Rain, and he took it off. We sequenced it on Around the World in a Day, and he took it off. We even put it on the Parade album, and he took it off. Then it got too late, and he couldn't release it. It was very personal, and I think he just didn't want people to hear it.

At one point, the track was also considered to be a part of his cancelled 1988 Rave unto the Joy Fantastic project. The track would eventually appear on the compilation album 4Ever, released 7 months after his death, making it his first posthumous track.

== Personnel ==
Credits sourced from Duane Tudahl, Benoît Clerc, and Guitarcloud

- Prince – lead and backing vocals, piano, Oberheim OB-Xa, electric guitars, bass guitar, Linn LM-1, Pearl SY-1 Syncussion
