= Delirious (Prince song) =

- US 7-inch single

Single by Prince

from the album 1999
- B-side: "Horny Toad"
- Released: August 17, 1983
- Recorded: May 9, 1982
- Studio: Sunset Sound (Hollywood)
- Genre: Funk rock
- Length: 4:00 (album version); 2:39 (single version); 6:00 (full-length version)
- Label: Warner Bros.
- Songwriter: Prince
- Producer: Prince

Prince singles chronology
"Little Red Corvette" (1983)	"Delirious" (1983)	"Let's Pretend We're Married" (1983)

"Delirious" is a song by American musician Prince, from his fifth studio album, 1999 (1982). It was the album's third single, and Prince's second Top 10 hit, reaching No. 8 in the US during the fall of 1983. The success of the single was boosted by the runaway success of the previous single, "Little Red Corvette", and also because DJs often played the first three album tracks in sequence, which just happened to be the order of the singles released from the album.

== Background ==
"Delirious" is a standard 12-bar blues number that tells how Prince is being driven crazy by a beautiful woman. The song teases the listener with sexual metaphors for cars and racing, hidden enough to avoid being censored. The track begins with a trademark Linn drum machine loop and a bit of synth bass before the synthesizer hook introduces the song. A rubbery bass guitar gives the track a rockabilly feel, which Prince had experimented earlier on "Jack U Off" from Controversy. The track ends suddenly with the sound effect of a baby cooing. In live performances over the years, Prince would later add live horns to the song, making it into more of a swing number. The 7-inch single release of the song included a poster bag with a 1983 calendar and images of Prince.

Cash Box called it "a bona fide finger-popper."

The B-side to the track is "Horny Toad", which is very similar in rockabilly style and instrumentation. Some of the sexually charged lyrics were interpreted as sadistic at the time and were the source of some controversy. The track was included on The Hits/The B-Sides in 1993 and 1999 Deluxe and Super Deluxe edition in 2019.

== Personnel ==
Credits sourced from Guitarcloud and Benoît Clerc:

- Prince – lead and backing vocals, Oberheim OB-Xa, electric guitar, bass guitar, Linn LM-1, finger snaps
- Lisa Coleman – backing vocals

== Charts ==
Chart performance for "Delirious"
Chart (1983)	Peak position
Canadian Singles Chart	27
New Zealand (Recorded Music NZ)	33
US Billboard Hot 100	8
US Billboard Hot Black Singles	18
