= Let's Pretend We're Married =

- US 7" single

Single by Prince

from the album 1999
- B-side: "Irresistible Bitch"
- Released: November 23, 1983
- Recorded: March 30, 1982
- Studio: Sunset Sound
- Genre: New wave; dance-rock
- Length: 7:20 (album version); 3:40 (single version)
- Label: Warner Bros.
- Songwriter: Prince
- Producer: Prince

Prince singles chronology
"Delirious" (1983)	"Let's Pretend We're Married" (1983)	"When Doves Cry" (1984)

"Let's Pretend We're Married" is a song by American musician Prince from his 1982 album 1999. It was the final US single from the album and peaked at number 52 in the US.

== Background ==
The song consists mainly of keyboards and drum machines, along with Prince's vocals. Two verses followed by choruses form the main basis of the song. The song breaks down to an instrumental section with Prince repeating "I wanna fuck you" followed by him saying "Look here, Marsha; I'm not saying this just to be nasty. I sincerely wanna fuck the taste out of your mouth." The final part of the song is an a cappella with Prince stating his philosophy on life—he loves God for fear of the afterlife but he's going to have fun while he can, a theme echoed in "1999". The song was performed live on the Purple Rain Tour. Prince's vocal range on the song spans from F_{2} to B♭_{6}.

== Reception and performances ==
The B-side, "Irresistible Bitch", received equal airplay and so qualified to chart alongside the A-side. The track was written and first recorded in 1981, and segues from the song "Feel U Up", which was re-recorded in 1986 for the Camille project. The original version of "Irresistible Bitch" has a much rougher vocal, and is an organ-driven song. The 1982-1983 remake which was released as the B-side of "Let's Pretend We're Married" has more percussion, both live drums and drum machines, along with bell-like keyboards and vocal backup from Wendy & Lisa. The lyrics are the familiar Prince theme of a jilted lover who treats his woman well, but gets treated badly in return. The song was performed on the Purple Rain tour, once again with the New Power Generation, for their 1992–1993 tours.

== Personnel ==
Credits sourced from Benoît Clerc and Guitarcloud

- Prince – lead and backing vocals, Oberheim OB-X, Oberheim OB-SX, bass guitar, Linn LM-1, Pearl SY-1 Syncussion

== Chart performance ==
Chart performance for "Let's Pretend We're Married"
Chart (1983–1984)	Peak position
US Billboard Hot 100	52
US Dance/Disco Top 80 (Billboard)	52
US Hot Black Singles (Billboard)	55

== Cover versions ==
Tina Turner covered "Let's Pretend We're Married" in live performances, and one of these is included on her The Collected Recordings – Sixties to Nineties album. This performance was originally released as the B-side of her own "Show Some Respect" single in 1984 (in the UK, it was included as the B-side of "I Can't Stand the Rain" in 1985).
