= Doctor Fink =

American keyboardist and songwriter

- Also known as: Matt Fink
- Born: Matthew Robert Fink; February 8, 1958 (age 68); Minneapolis, Minnesota, U.S.
- Genres: Funk, R&B, alternative dance, pop
- Occupations: Keyboardist, songwriter, record producer
- Instruments: Synthesizer, keyboard, piano, sampler, vocals, vocoder
- Years active: 1978–present
- Labels: Warner Bros., Paisley Park Records, Sony

Matthew Robert Fink (born February 8, 1958), better known as Dr. Fink, is a keyboardist, producer, and songwriter best-known for playing keyboards in Prince's band, The Revolution. At Prince concerts, he was distinguished onstage for performing dressed in a surgical mask and scrubs. He has also worked with artists, songwriters and producers, including The Time, Lipps Inc., The Jets, Vanity 6, David Z., Bobby Z., P. Diddy, The Rembrandts, Phil Solem, PC Munoz, 7 Aurelius, Steve Nathan, Shock G, Kris Vanderheyden Bray, Criss Starr, and Marc Mozart.

Fink has won three Grammy Awards, three American Music Awards, and numerous RIAA gold and platinum awards for his work with Prince and The Revolution.

== Life and career ==
Fink joined Prince’s band in 1978, which later became The Revolution and worked with him until 1991. His work with Prince included his work with The Revolution, The NPG, Madhouse, and the 1984 film and album Purple Rain, which has sold over 25 million copies worldwide.

His work with Prince includes co-writing credits along with other band members on the songs "Dirty Mind", "Computer Blue", "17 Days", "America" and "It's Gonna Be a Beautiful Night", as well as studio session credits on the albums Dirty Mind, Controversy, 1999, Purple Rain, Around the World in a Day, Parade, Sign o' the Times, Lovesexy, The Black Album, and Graffiti Bridge.

In 1987, Fink opened his own studio facility in Minneapolis, now called “The Operating Room,” where he works on other projects such as his Sony Acid Loop libraries titled Dr. Fink’s Funk Factory and Matt Fink’s StarView Session Keys which is also part of the quartet of the Artist Integrated Sample Libraries.

After his tenure with Prince, he became staff producer/engineer for Minneapolis-based record label K-Tel/Dominion Entertainment, from 1991 to 1996 where he produced and recorded fifteen specialty album projects. In 2001, he released the solo album Ultrasound. Other credits include video game soundtracks for Headgames/Activision, work with King Show Games on both voiceover and music for casino game machines, PBS documentaries, and various advertising spots.

In 2007, Fink signed an exclusive management deal with the German-based management and production company, Mozart & Friends, where he worked on various projects for Universal Music Group, Warner Bros. and Sony Entertainment.

After Prince's death in 2016, Dr. Fink reunited with The Revolution, who had a song featured in the 2019 Netflix feature, Wine Country starring Amy Poehler, Maya Rudolph, Rachel Dratch, Ana Gasteyer, and Tina Fey.

Currently, he works with New York-based company V-Media Entertainment as Director of Catalogue and Licensing and staff producer/engineer for their Minneapolis-based recording studio River Rock Studios.
