= Controversy (song) =

- 1981 UK 7-inch single

Single by Prince

from the album Controversy
- B-side: 1981: "When You Were Mine"; 1993: "The Future"; "Glam Slam"; "D.M.S.R."; "Anotherloverholenyohead"; "Paisley Park"; "New Power Generation (Part II)"
- Released: September 2, 1981
- Genre: Electro rock; new wave; funk; dance
- Length: 7:14 (album version); 3:39 (7-Inch edit); 6:06 (2004 release)
- Label: Warner Bros. (original); NPG (2004 release)
- Songwriter: Prince
- Producer: Prince

Prince singles chronology
"Gotta Stop (Messin' About)" (1981)	"Controversy" (1981)	"Sexuality" (1981)

Music video
- "Controversy" on YouTube

Prince (1993) singles chronology
"Peach" (1993)	"Controversy" (1993)	"The Most Beautiful Girl In the World" (1994)

Prince (2004) singles chronology
"Days of Wild" (2002)	"Controversy (Live in Hawaii)" (2004)	"Musicology" (2004)

"Controversy" is a song by American musician Prince, released in September 1981 by Warner Bros. as the lead single and title track to his fourth album (1981). The song was written and produced by him, and addresses speculation about Prince at the time such as his sexuality, gender, religion, and racial background, and how he could not understand the curiosity surrounding him. "Controversy" is considered Prince's breakthrough hit in Australia, where it peaked at number 15. In the US, it peaked at numbers three and 70 on the US Billboard Soul Singles chart and Billboard Hot 100. Also, along with the track, "Let's Work", "Controversy" was the first of seven number ones on the dance chart for Prince. On November 29, 1993, in support of The Hits/The B-Sides, the song was once again released in the UK as a single, reaching number five on the UK Singles Chart in December 1993.

== Composition ==
The song has two main verses, a few choruses, with the title repeated throughout the track. Towards the middle he recites the Lord's Prayer in full, which fueled the fire for some to say the song was blasphemous. Toward the end is a repeating chant of "People call me rude / I wish we all were nude / I wish there was no black and white / I wish there were no rules." The song features a steady 4/4 drumbeat, synthesized bass, guitar, and keyboards. The song was backed with "When You Were Mine", from his previous album, Dirty Mind.

== Live in Hawaii ==
"Controversy (Live in Hawaii)" is a digital single made available for sale on Prince's website on March 29, 2004. The single consists of a live performance of the song: "Controversy", recorded on tour in Hawaii in 2003. The track also saw a limited release as a CD single, only available as part of a Prince in Hawaii Gift Box, available from Prince's retail outlet.

== Legacy ==
In 2022, Rolling Stone ranked "Controversy" number 19 in their list of the "200 Greatest Dance Songs of All Time".

== Personnel ==
Sourced from Benoît Clerc, Guitarcloud, Morris Day and David Ritz.

- Prince – lead and backing vocals, Oberheim OB-X, Oberheim OB-SX, electric guitars, bass guitar, Pearl SY-1 Syncussion, handclaps; possible drums
- Lisa Coleman – backing vocals
- Morris Day – possible drums

== Charts ==
=== Weekly charts ===
Weekly chart performance for "Controversy"
Chart (1981–1982)	Peak position
Australia (Kent Music Report)	15
Netherlands (Single Top 100)	28
US Billboard Hot 100	70
US Hot Soul Singles (Billboard)	3
US Hot Dance Club Songs (Billboard)	1

1993 weekly chart performance for "Controversy"
Chart (1993)	Peak position
UK Singles (Official Charts)	5
UK Airplay (Music Week)	9

2016 weekly chart performance for "Controversy"
Chart (2016)	Peak position
France (SNEP)	52

=== Year-end charts ===
Year-end chart performance for "Controversy"
Chart (1982)	Position
Australia (Kent Music Report)	73
