= Controversy (Prince album) =

Studio album by Prince
- Released: October 14, 1981
- Recorded: June 1981 (Note: "Do Me, Baby"); August 14–23, 1981
- Studios: Kiowa Trail home studio (Chanhassen, Minnesota); Hollywood Sound (Hollywood, California); Sunset Sound (Hollywood, California)
- Genres: Pop; new wave; funk; rock; R&B
- Length: 37:15
- Label: Warner Bros.
- Producer: Prince

Prince chronology
Dirty Mind (1980)	Controversy (1981)	1999 (1982)

Singles from Controversy
- 1. "Controversy" Released: September 2, 1981; 2. "Sexuality" Released: October 1981 (EU, JP & AU); 3. "Let's Work" Released: January 6, 1982; 4. "Do Me, Baby" Released: July 16, 1982 (US & PE)

Controversy is the fourth studio album by the American singer-songwriter and musician Prince, released on October 14, 1981, by Warner Bros. Records. Prince wrote and produced the entire album, except for one track, and also performed most of the instruments on the recording.

Controversy reached number three on the Billboard R&B Albums chart and was certified Platinum by the Recording Industry Association of America (RIAA). It was voted the eighth best album of the year in the 1981 Pazz & Jop, an annual critics poll run by The Village Voice.

This was the first of his albums to strongly associate Prince with the color purple as well as the first to use sensational spelling in his song titles.

== Music and lyrics ==
Controversy opens with the title track, which raises questions that were being asked about Prince at the time, including his race and sexuality. The song "flirts with blasphemy" by including a chant of The Lord's Prayer. "Do Me, Baby" is an "extended bump-n-grind" ballad with explicitly sexual lyrics, and "Ronnie, Talk to Russia" is a politically charged plea to President Ronald Reagan. "Private Joy" is a bouncy bubblegum pop-funk tune, "showing off Prince's lighter side", followed by "Annie Christian", which lists historical events such as the murder of African-American children in Atlanta and the death of John Lennon. The album's final song, "Jack U Off", is a synthesized rockabilly-style track.

== Critical reception ==
Professional ratings
Review scores
Source	Rating
AllMusic	3.5/5 stars
Blender	4/5 stars
Chicago Sun-Times	4/4 stars
Entertainment Weekly	B+
The Guardian	4/5 stars
Pitchfork	9.0/10
Rolling Stone	4/5 stars
The Rolling Stone Album Guide	3.5/5 stars
Spin Alternative Record Guide	8/10
The Village Voice	A−

In a contemporary review for Rolling Stone, music critic Stephen Holden wrote that "Prince's first three records were so erotically self-absorbed that they suggested the reveries of a licentious young libertine. On Controversy, that libertine proclaims unfettered sexuality as the fundamental condition of a new, more loving society than the bellicose, overtechnologized America of Ronald Reagan." He went on to say, "Despite all the contradictions and hyperbole in Prince's playboy philosophy, I still find his message refreshingly relevant."

Robert Christgau was less enthusiastic in a generally favorable review for The Village Voice, in which he wrote that its "socially conscious songs are catchy enough, but they spring from the mind of a rather confused young fellow, and while his politics get better when he sticks to his favorite subject, which is s-e-x, nothing here is as far-out and on-the-money as 'Head' or 'Sister' or the magnificent 'When You Were Mine.'"

According to Blender's Keith Harris, Controversy is "Prince's first attempt to get you to love him for his mind, not just his body", as it "refines the propulsive funk of previous albums and adds treatises on religion, work, nuclear war and Abscam." Stephen Thomas Erlewine of AllMusic remarked that it "continues in the same vein of new wave-tinged funk on Dirty Mind, emphasizing Prince's fascination with synthesizers and synthesizing disparate pop music genres".

Controversy was voted the eighth best album of the year in the 1981 Pazz & Jop, an annual critics' poll run by The Village Voice.

== Track listing ==
All songs written by Prince.

Side one
No.	Title	Length
1.	"Controversy"	7:15
2.	"Sexuality"	4:21
3.	"Do Me, Baby"	7:43
Total length:		19:19

Side two
No.	Title	Length
4.	"Private Joy"	4:29
5.	"Ronnie, Talk to Russia"	1:58
6.	"Let's Work"	3:54
7.	"Annie Christian"	4:22
8.	"Jack U Off"	3:09
Total length:		17:52 37:11

== Personnel ==
Adapted from Benoît Clerc, Liz Raiss, and Guitarcloud

=== Musicians ===
- Prince – lead and backing vocals (all tracks), electric guitar (tracks 1–2, 4–8), bass (tracks 1–6, 8), drums (tracks 1–3, 5–6), Linn LM-1 (track 4), claps (tracks 1, 5-7), Pearl SY-1 Syncussion (track 1-2, 4), Korg Mini Pops SR-120 (track 7), ARP Omni (tracks 3, 4, 6), Oberheim OB-X (track 1-7), Oberheim OB-SX (track 1), Yamaha CP-70 electric grand piano (track 3)
- Morris Day – possible drums (track 1)
- Lisa Coleman – backing vocals (tracks 1, 5, 8), Oberheim OB-SX (track 8)
- Doctor Fink – Oberheim OB-X (track 8)
- Bobby Z. – drums (track 8), Pearl SY-1 Syncussion (track 8)

=== Technical ===
- Prince – producer
- Bob Mockler, Mick Guzauski, Ross Pallone – recording engineers (tracks 1–3, 5–8)
- Peggy McCreary – recording engineer (tracks 1–7)
- Bernie Grundman – mastering (A&M Studios)
- Allen Beaulieu – photography

== Charts ==
=== Weekly charts ===
Weekly chart performance for Controversy
Chart (1981)	Peak position
Australian Albums Chart	55
Dutch Albums Chart	50
US Billboard 200	21
US Billboard Top R&B/Hip-Hop Albums	3

=== Year-end charts ===
Year-end chart performance for Controversy
Chart (1982)	Position
US Billboard Pop Albums	59
US Billboard Top R&B/Hip-Hop Albums	15

== Certifications ==
Certifications for Controversy
Region	Certification	Certified units/sales
United Kingdom (BPI)	Gold	100,000^{^}
United States (RIAA)	Platinum	1,000,000^{^}
Summaries
Worldwide	—	2,300,000
^{^} Shipments figures based on certification alone.

== See also ==
- Ronald Reagan in music
