= Uptown (Prince song) =

Single by Prince

from the album Dirty Mind
- B-side: "Crazy You"
- Released: September 10, 1980
- Recorded: Minneapolis, May–June 1980
- Genre: Funk rock; dance; disco-funk
- Length: 5:32 (album version); 4:09 (7" edit)
- Label: Warner Bros.
- Songwriter(s): Prince
- Producer(s): Prince

Prince singles chronology
"Bambi" (1980)	"Uptown" (1980)	"Dirty Mind" (1980)

"Uptown" is the lead single from Prince's third album, Dirty Mind. Beginning with a lone drum intro, the track explodes into the keyboards of the chorus. The verses feature a more prominent funk guitar. The song breaks down to a more instrumental section toward the end that mainly consists of guitar, bass and drums with an occasional keyboard riff. The minimalist style of the song is representative of most of the Dirty Mind album. The song addresses the Uptown neighborhood of Minneapolis that was the city's hang-out spot for artists.

== Background ==
The song addresses prejudices and racism, referring to "Uptown" as a metaphor for an ideal place that is free of such things. Prince sings in the first person, and the song opens describing a chance meeting with an attractive woman who then asks in an offensive way if he is gay. The lyrics then rail against prejudice and racism as narrow minded, and exalt in an attitude and spirit that is free of such negativity. It is one of Prince's earliest efforts to blend political statements into his art.

Uptown is described as an area where one can be free to express oneself, and Prince was very fond of the concept. The song opened the Controversy Tour and made a few live appearances after that, notably in Prince's 2001 Hit + Run Tour. The B-side is "Crazy You" from his debut album, For You.

== Personnel ==
Credits sourced from Benoît Clerc and Guitarcloud.

- Prince – lead and backing vocals, Oberheim OB-X, ARP Omni, clavinet, Polymoog, electric guitars, bass guitar, drums

== Charts ==
Chart performance for "Uptown"
Chart (1980)	Peak position
US Billboard Bubbling Under Hot 100 Singles	101
US Billboard Hot Soul Singles	5
US Billboard Hot Dance Club Songs	5
