= Dirty Mind =

1980 studio album by Prince

Studio album by Prince
- Released: October 8, 1980
- Recorded: May–June 1980
- Studio: Wayzata, Minnesota
- Genres: Funk; post-disco; new wave; pop; R&B
- Length: 30:14
- Label: Warner Bros.
- Producer: Prince

Prince chronology
Prince (1979)	Dirty Mind (1980)	Controversy (1981)

Singles from Dirty Mind
- 1. "Uptown" Released: September 10, 1980; 2. "Head" Released: 1980 (US & PH); 3. "When You Were Mine" Released: 1980 (US); 4. "Dirty Mind" Released: November 26, 1980; 5. "Do It All Night" Released: March 6, 1981 (UK)

Dirty Mind is the third studio album by the American singer-songwriter and musician Prince. It was released on October 8, 1980, by Warner Bros. Records. The album is notable for Prince's increasing use of rock music elements, high register vocals, sexually explicit lyrical themes and an androgynous image. Critics have hailed its fusion of genres for influencing urban black music of the early 1980s, and its lyrics for influencing more sexually explicit music.

The first single from Dirty Mind, "Uptown", reached number five on both the Billboard Hot Soul Singles and the Billboard National Disco Action Top 30 charts. Although the album only reached number 45 on the Billboard 200, it reached the Top 10 on the Billboard Top Black Albums chart. The album was met with widespread critical acclaim and was viewed as a breakthrough in Prince's early career. It has retrospectively been ranked by Pitchfork and Slant as one of the best albums of the 1980s, and by Rolling Stone and NME as one of the greatest albums of all time.

Dirty Mind ranks alongside Purple Rain (1984) and Sign o' the Times (1987) as the most acclaimed albums of Prince's career. It has been certified gold by the Recording Industry Association of America (RIAA) for certified sales in the US of 500,000 copies. Following Prince's death in 2016, the album re-charted in the US, whilst also charting in France, Switzerland, and the UK for the first time.

== Composition and recording ==
A fusion of funk, new wave, R&B and dance, Dirty Mind also contains more rock-oriented beats than Prince's previous albums, as well as elements of punk rock on the track "Sister". Half of the songs were composed by Prince on tour, when he and his band had a slot opening for Rick James.

The album was recorded in a makeshift 16-track studio in the basement of Prince's home on Lake Minnetonka, with Prince engineering the album himself, credited under the pseudonym Jamie Starr. Sessions occurred in May and June 1980, with Prince playing nearly all of the instruments himself, and several of the songs were recorded in one night. The album contrasted with Prince's previous ones in its raw and unpolished production style, with several of the tracks being essentially demos. The production presents a clean sound with minimal distortion or reverb, more akin to power pop or punk rock. Barry Walters of Pitchfork later observed that, "Whereas Prince's '70s albums proclaimed his virtuosity, here he achieves much more by confining himself to the simplest, boldest strokes." It is the only Prince album to not feature a "slow jam".

=== Side one ===
The core riff of "Dirty Mind" was originally a jam devised by keyboardist Doctor Fink for Prince's band. He and Prince recorded it in one evening and Prince finished it the next morning. The song is set to a metronomic disco beat, likened by Walters to the motorik beat of Krautrock. The song melds Minneapolis funk with new wave and post-punk, featuring falsetto singing and percussive guitar, as well as "tinny keyboard hooks". Stephen Thomas Erlewine of AllMusic described the song as "robotic funk". Walters notes that the song's descending key changes mixed with ascending church organ chords are "a particularly Prince-like juxtaposition that offers a peek-a-boo glimpse into the convolutions—sexual and otherwise—of his psyche."

"When You Were Mine" was written in a Florida hotel room. John Freeman of The Quietus deemed the song Prince's "first great rock song", featuring "frantic guitars" and "squidgy keyboards". It has been classified by several critics as new wave and likened to the works of Elvis Costello. Lyrically, the song contains elements of gender bending, as well as voyeurism and cuckoldry, and Freeman noted that the song's dynamic forecasted later Prince tracks like "Little Red Corvette", "Paisley Park" and "If I Was Your Girlfriend". The track is one of Prince's most covered songs and was recorded by Cyndi Lauper for her 1983 album She's So Unusual.

"Do It All Night" contains "sultry funk", with Kenneth Partridge of Billboard noting the chorus' "urgent sixteenth-note keyboards underscoring Prince's [sexual] eagerness". "Gotta Broken Heart Again", a minimalistic ballad featuring "effortless falsetto", "breezy piano", and "soulful crooning", forecasts Prince's work on his 1986 album Parade.

=== Side two ===
"Uptown", another song featuring a heavy disco beat, is billed by Partridge as a "utopian funk-rock anthem [...] about racial and sexual tolerance", melding the styles of Kool & the Gang and the Clash. Walters hailed it as being "among the most daring R&B radio hits of the '80s", due to its lyrical themes about "how homophobia constricts even heterosexuals":

While minding his own business, a passing hottie asks him point blank, "Are you gay?" But instead of blowing his cool, Prince reasons, "She's just a victim of society and all its games." To school the dame, he takes her to Uptown, a real-life Minneapolis counterculture haven back in 1980 that's subsequently been gentrified. There, she loses her uptight ways as the track's grinding disco-funk gains momentum; the overwhelming freedom acts as an aphrodisiac, and the once-scorned weirdo gets "the best night I ever had." Everybody's happy.

— Barry Walters, Prince: Dirty Mind Album Review, Pitchfork

"Head" and "Sister" are both among Prince's "most infamous" and "notorious" songs. Freeman stated that "Head" "outlines the shameless seduction of a bride-to-be with the promise of oral delights, over a sweating, squelching synth hook." Walters noted its significantly slower tempo and deemed it "one of the earliest fully realized manifestations of Prince's quintessential style." Partridge observed that the song "reads like a letter to Penthouse Forum", while noting "Dr. Fink's squiggly sci-fi keyboards".

The brief "Sister" was billed by Freeman as "Prince's most furious punk song" and a "piss-take". Walters stated that the song "celebrates incest like the rest of the record toys with sexual identity; it's blatantly performative", and felt that the music, with its Ramones-like guitars and constantly changing time signatures, echoed the unstable nature of the lyrics. Partridge also noted its lyrical ambiguity, calling the song "a filthy romp as audacious and fun as anything the Sex Pistols ever did."

The music for "Partyup" was originally penned by Morris Day, in a period where he and Prince were hanging out and jamming together regularly. Day has stated that the original track he recorded, consisting of only bass and drums, was "a lot slower and funkier", and that he was unhappy with the funk-rock direction in which Prince ultimately took the song. Musically, Walters observed that the song is "uncut funk with louder guitars and tunes so catchy you can't deny the pop." Freeman billed the song as a "good-time freak out jam, with Prince extolling the merits of 'revolutionary rock & roll'." Lyrically, the song finds Prince "furious [...] at war", inspired by then-President Jimmy Carter's 1980 reinstatement of military draft registration, and features a "'60s-worthy closing chant". Partridge deemed it "the most danceable anti-war anthem since Edwin Starr's 'War.'" To compensate Day for writing the music, Prince created the Time as a vehicle for Day, and the two created the band's first three albums almost entirely by themselves.

== Release ==
Dirty Mind peaked at number 45 on the Billboard 200 and number 7 on the Billboard Top Black Albums chart. The first single, "Uptown", reached number five on both the Billboard Hot Soul Singles and Dance Club Songs charts, but only 101 on the Billboard Bubbling Under Hot 100 Singles chart. The title track was released as the second single and was modestly successful on the R&B chart. The songs "Uptown", "Dirty Mind", and "Head" were released together, reaching the dance chart's top five.

On June 6, 1984, the album was certified Gold by the Recording Industry Association of America (RIAA). Following the death of Prince in 2016, the album re-entered the Billboard 200 and also entered the album charts in France, Switzerland and the UK for the first time.

== Critical reception ==
Professional ratings
Review scores
Source	Rating
AllMusic	5/5 stars
Blender	5/5 stars
Chicago Sun-Times	4/4 stars
Christgau's Record Guide	A
Entertainment Weekly	A
The Guardian	5/5 stars
Pitchfork	10/10
Rolling Stone	4.5/5 stars
(The New) Rolling Stone Album Guide	5/5 stars
Spin Alternative Record Guide	10/10

Dirty Mind earned widespread acclaim from music critics. According to the writer Simon Reynolds, the album's "rave reception [...] saw rock critics anointing [Prince] as the genre-crossing, gender-bending, races-uniting saviour of modern music". Reynolds quotes Barney Hoskyns, who in his New Musical Express review of Dirty Mind described it as "the glam-funk Let's Get It On."

Ken Tucker of Rolling Stone wrote that the album finds Prince shifting from the "doe-eyed romantic" of his first two records to a "liberating lewdness" which "jolts with the unsettling tension that arises from rubbing complex erotic wordplay against clean, simple melodies", all along an "electric surface". Tucker remarked on how Prince casually delivers lyrics with a "graceful quaver" and "exhilarating breathlessness", combining "the sweet romanticism of Smokey Robinson" and "the powerful vulgate poetry of Richard Pryor". He concluded that the album was "cool music dealing with hot emotions", and, "at its best [...] positively filthy". Writing that same month in The Village Voice, Robert Christgau found the music's "metallic textures and simple drum patterns" comparable to both Funkadelic and the Rolling Stones, while acknowledging Prince as being in the generally shy-mannered "love-man" tradition because of his falsetto singing, but ultimately distinct in his "aggressively, audaciously erotic" character: "I'm talking about your basic fuckbook fantasies—the kid sleeps with his sister and digs it, sleeps with his girlfriend's boyfriend and doesn't, and stops a wedding by gamahuching the bride on her way to church. I mean, Mick Jagger can just fold up his penis and go home." (Note: Michaelangelo Matos from The A.V. Club later said the last sentence of Christgau's review "remains the single best sentence ever written on Prince".)

Retrospective appraisals have also been positive. In The Trouser Press Guide to New Wave Records (1983), Trouser Press writer Jim Green stated, "If the ultra sex obsession doesn't put you off, Dirty Mind's catchy tunes, sly lyrics, and strong production, and Prince's trademark falsetto make for a winning combination." Erlewine described the album as a "stunning, audacious amalgam of funk, new wave, R&B, and pop, fueled by grinningly salacious sex and the desire to shock". According to Michaelangelo Matos in (The New) Rolling Stone Album Guide (2004), "Dirty Mind remains one of the most radical 180-degree turns in pop history." Robert Hilburn of the Los Angeles Times described the music as a "confident and highly danceable blend of post-disco funk and tasty, hard-line rock", while Keith Harris of Blender credited it for setting "confessions of a sex junkie" to the sounds of "new-wave funk". Walters deemed it Prince's "first fully actualized album" and "an unrelenting dance party that pointedly invited New Wavers to boogie down alongside funk bunnies and dancefloor fashionistas." Freeman opined that Dirty Mind was Prince's most creative and boldest album, setting the standard for his artistic direction in the following years. Partridge called the album an "absolute essential — an eight-song, 30-minute glimpse into the mind of a thong-rocking pacifist with some interesting ideas about marriage and sibling relations", and added that it "benefits from its complete lack of outside perspective."

== Legacy ==
In their list of the "100 Best Albums of the Eighties", Rolling Stone stated that Dirty Mind "marked Prince's coming of age. It was the first album on which he successfully synthesized the rock and soul he had grown up on into a vibrant, strikingly original sound, at the same time turning his own sexuality and flamboyance into a clear-cut style and stance." Walters billed the album as a "landmark album" that "couldn't be purer punk", due to its rejection of "labels, restrictions, and authority."

Due to Dirty Mind's fusion of genres, Erlewine observed that it "set the style for much of the urban soul and funk of the early '80s." Similarly, Rolling Stone stated that "Prince's keyboard-dominated 'Minneapolis sound' became the blueprint for a generation of soul, funk and pop groups. His influence is evident in songs ranging from Ready for the World's 'Oh Sheila' to Fine Young Cannibals' 'She Drives Me Crazy.'" Walters hailed it as "one of the key records that truly initiated the '80s." In Christgau's opinion, Prince's impact as a "commercially viable" yet "visionary" artist with the album was comparable to John Lennon, Bob Dylan, and Jimi Hendrix.

Walters also noted Prince's "free and startlingly girly" vocals, as well as his androgynous image during this era, adding, "it can't be underestimated how much Prince quite threateningly set off gaydar". Partridge noted that "Prince wasn't the first R&B artist to sing in falsetto, but the daring femininity he brings to this performance paints him as a different sort of lover-man." Dennis Hunt of the Los Angeles Times noted the songs' prominently sexual lyrics. Erlewine credited the album's explicit themes, including oral sex, threesomes and ejaculation, for opening the doors for sexually explicit albums in the following years.

Dirty Mind has ranked highly on professional lists of the greatest albums. Pitchfork placed the album at number 87 on a list of the 100 best albums from the 1980s, while Slant Magazine ranked it 53rd on a similar list. In 2013, NME ranked it number 393 in its list of The 500 Greatest Albums of All Time. Rolling Stone has ranked it number 326 among the magazine's 500 greatest albums of all time (published in 2020) and 18th among albums from the 1980s.

== Track listing ==
All tracks are written by Prince, except where noted.

Side one
No.	Title	Writer(s)	Length
1.	"Dirty Mind"	Prince; Doctor Fink	4:14
2.	"When You Were Mine"		3:47
3.	"Do It All Night"		3:42
4.	"Gotta Broken Heart Again"		2:16
Total length:			13:59

Side two
No.	Title	Writer(s)	Length
5.	"Uptown"		5:32
6.	"Head"		4:44
7.	"Sister"		1:31
8.	"Partyup"	Prince; Morris Day	4:24
Total length:			16:11 30:10

== Personnel ==
Credits adapted from LP liner notes, as well as Benoît Clerc and Jon Regen.

=== Musicians ===
- Prince – lead vocals, backing vocals, electric guitar, bass guitar, drums (tracks 1–8), Yamaha CP-70 electric grand piano (tracks 3–4, 8), Oberheim OB-X (tracks 1–6, 8), ARP Omni (tracks 2–3, 5), clavinet (track 5), Polymoog (track 5), tambourine (track 8), claps (tracks 6, 8)
- Doctor Fink – Oberheim OB-X (track 6), ARP Omni (track 1)
- Lisa Coleman – spoken vocals (track 6), backing vocals (track 8), keyboards (track 8; uncredited)

=== Production ===
- Prince – producer, engineer (credited as Jamie Starr), mixing
- Don Batts – engineer
- Mick Guzauski – mixing
- Bob Mockler – mixing (3, 6)
- Ron Garrett – mixing assistant
- Bernie Grundman – mastering

=== Technical ===
- Allen Beaulieu – photography

== Charts ==
=== Weekly charts ===
1980 weekly chart performance for Dirty Mind
Chart (1980)	Peak position
US Billboard 200	45
US Top R&B/Hip-Hop Albums (Billboard)	7

2016 weekly chart performance for Dirty Mind
Chart (2016)	Peak position
French Albums (SNEP)	193
Swiss Albums (Schweizer Hitparade)	79
UK Albums (Official Charts)	61
US Billboard 200	56

=== Year-end charts ===
Year-end chart performance for Dirty Mind
Chart (1981)	Position
US Top R&B/Hip-Hop Albums (Billboard)	30

=== Singles ===
- "Uptown" (US) (No. 101, US; No. 5, US R&B; No. 5, US Dance)
- "Dirty Mind" (US) (No. 65, US R&B)
- "Do It All Night" (UK)

== Certifications ==
Certifications for Dirty Mind
Region	Certification	Certified units/sales
United States (RIAA)	Gold	500,000^{^}
Summaries
Worldwide	—	1,800,000
^{^} Shipments figures based on certification alone.
