= ARP Omni =

Polyphonic analogue synthesizer

Omni
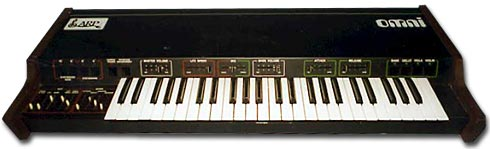
- ARP Omni 1
- Manufacturer: ARP Instruments, Inc.
- Dates: Omni 1: 1975 – 1977; Omni 2: 1978 – 1981

Technical specifications
- Polyphony: 49
- Timbrality: 2
- LFO: 1
- Synthesis type: Analog Subtractive
- Filter: 24dB/oct Low Pass
- Attenuator: Strings: AR; Polysynth & Bass: ADSR
- Storage memory: None (Preset voicings)
- Effects: 3-Voice Chorus Phaser

Input/output
- Keyboard: 49-key non-weighted organ type
- External control: Gate & Trigger Out VCF CV, ADSR Release

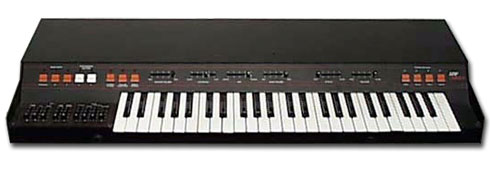
ARP Omni 2

The ARP Omni was a polyphonic analog synthesizer manufactured by ARP Instruments, Inc.

== Overview ==
The Omni featured preset, electronically generated Orchestral ensemble String voices including polyphonic Violin and Viola sounds as well as monophonic Bass and Cello. The instrument also included a monophonic Bass Synthesizer section and a polyphonic Synthesizer section. The Synthesizer section featured a 24 dB/oct Voltage-Controlled Low Pass Filter (LPF); an ADSR envelope generator and a single waveform (triangle) Low Frequency Oscillator (LFO) were both routed to control the VCF Cutoff frequency. A Waveform Enhancement switch allowed selection of a square wave voice waveform vs. the default quasi-sawtooth waveform. The ARP Omni had a unique logo that was painted on to the back face of the unit.

== Voicing ==
The String and Synthesizer sections of the 49-note Omni utilized the Mostek MK50240 Top Octave generator IC along with divide-down circuitry; as a result, these sections were fully polyphonic, as opposed to subsequent polyphonic synthesizers such as the Sequential Circuits Prophet-5 and Yamaha CS-80 which featured dynamically allocated, limited polyphony of 5- and 8-voices respectively (although these units featured a far more comprehensive and complex synthesis architecture).

The three sections of the Omni - Strings, Synthesizer, and Bass - were all simultaneously available and mixable; the String and Synthesizer sections featured separate audio outputs on the rear panel of the unit which allowed separate amplification and signal processing of these sections for stereo effects. The Omni was single-oscillator in nature; normally, the String section alone was processed through the on board, patented ARP 3-voice Chorus Phaser circuit, producing the lush, moving sound the instrument is most known for. However, the Synthesizer section was processed through this circuit when a front panel "Chorus Phaser" switch was activated, simultaneously summing the String and Synthesizer section outputs and slowing the Chorus speed.

== In use ==
The Omni was very popular in its time, as it was amongst the first available polyphonic electronic keyboard synthesizers. Examples of the capabilities and sounds of the Omni can be heard in recordings such as "Good Times Roll", "Moving in Stereo" and "All Mixed Up" from the American Pop/New Wave band The Cars' eponymous debut album. Cars' keyboardist Greg Hawkes stated in a 1979 Keyboard magazine interview that all keyboard sounds heard on "Moving In Stereo" were produced by the ARP Omni. An example of the Waveform Enhancement mode can be heard as the lead line in the 1982 hit "I Melt With You" by the English band Modern English from their album After The Snow. Journey's keyboardist Jonathan Cain is reported to have used an Omni on the 1981 album Escape in particular on "Don't Stop Believin'".

== Versions ==
ARP Instruments introduced an updated version of the Omni as the Omni-2 in 1978. The Omni-2 utilized an all-steel chassis with ARP's orange and black color scheme and an updated Chorus Phaser circuit which ARP claimed to be superior to that of the original Omni. Additionally, the Omni-2's Bass voice utilized a single oscillator waveform circuit coupled with a preset 2-pole, Low Pass Filter and preset Attack Decay Release (ADR) envelope generator. A Staccato switch controlled the Bass section's envelope contour Decay time vs. the original Omni Bass voice ADSR assignment via its Synthesizer section. Further, the Omni-2 Bass section had its own audio output on the rear panel in addition to the Strings and Synthesizer outputs; separate amplification of these three distinct outputs was referred to in ARP literature at the time as "Tri-phonic". The Omni-2 also featured selectable Single- or Multiple-Trigger keyboard control of envelope contours and re-branded the original Waveform Enhancement panel control switch as "Hollow Waveform".
