= Oberheim OB-X =

Analog polyphonic sound synthesizer

OB-X
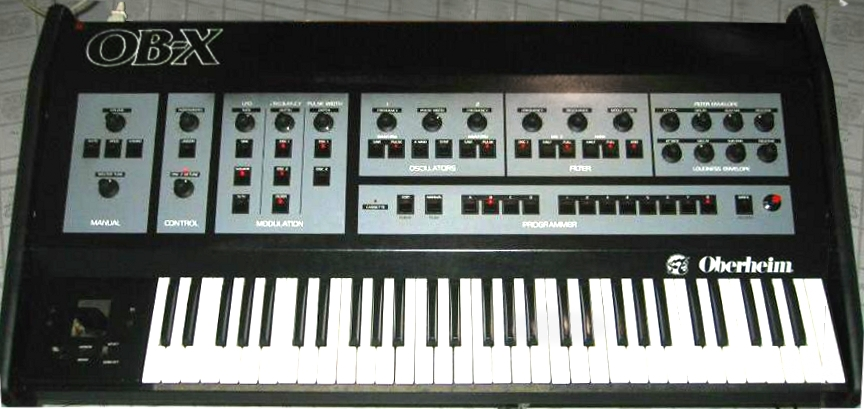
- Oberheim OB-X
- Manufacturer: Oberheim
- Dates: 1979–1981
- Price: US$4,595–US$5,995; GB£99.99 (VST version)

Technical specifications
- Polyphony: 4, 6 or 8 voices
- Timbrality: Monotimbral
- Oscillator: 2 VCOs per voice
- LFO: 1
- Synthesis type: Analog Subtractive
- Filter: 12dB per octave resonant low-pass
- Attenuator: 2 × ADSR; one for VCF, one for VCA
- Aftertouch expression: No
- Velocity expression: No
- Storage memory: 32 patches

Input/output
- Keyboard: 61-key
- External control: CV/Gate

The Oberheim OB-X was the first of Oberheim's OB-series polyphonic analog subtractive synthesizers.

First commercially available in June 1979, the OB-X was introduced to compete with the Sequential Circuits Prophet-5, which had been successfully introduced the year before. About 800 units were produced before the OB-X was discontinued and replaced by the updated and streamlined OB-Xa in 1981. The OB line developed and evolved after that with the OB-8 before being replaced by the Matrix series.

The OB-X was used in popular music by Rush (on Moving Pictures and Signals), OMD, Nena, Styx member Dennis DeYoung (used frequently from late 1979 to 1984), Queen (on The Game, their first synthesizer on an album), Madonna for her debut album, Prince (from Dirty Mind to Around the World in a Day), and Jean-Michel Jarre who used it for its "brass" sounds.

== Specification ==
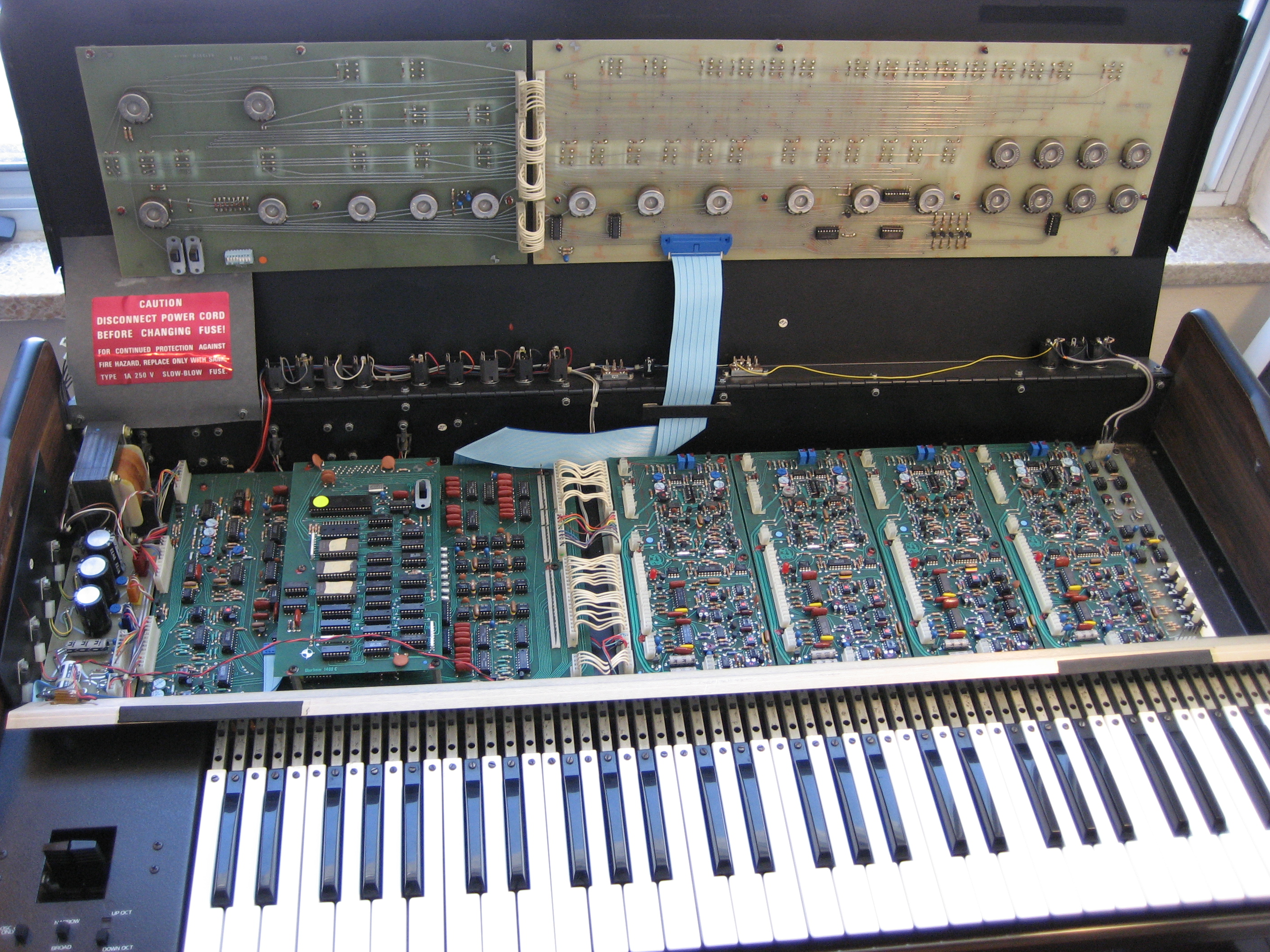
Oberheim OB-X internal view

The OB-X was the first Oberheim synthesizer based on a single printed circuit board called a "voice card" (still using mostly discrete components) rather than the earlier SEM (Synthesizer Expander Module) used in Oberheim semi-modular systems, which had required multiple modules to achieve polyphony. The OB-X's memory held 32 user-programmable presets. The synthesizer's built-in Z-80 microprocessor also automated the tuning process. This made the OB-X less laborious to program, more functional for live performance, and more portable than its ancestors.

The "X" in OB-X originally stood for the number of voice-cards (notes of polyphony) installed. It came in four, six, and eight-voice models with polyphonic portamento, and sample and hold. Even the 4-voice model was expensive at US$4,595. The entire range used "paddle" levers for pitch and modulation, Oberheim's answer to the "wheel" controls of the Prophet-5. Though these controls were never as popular as the standard pitch and modulation wheels, the philosophy was to mimic the motion of a guitar player bending the strings on their guitar. On most other synthesizers the pitch bend wheel was on the left, and the modulation wheel to the right of it; on the OB-X Oberheim placed them in the opposite relative positions. In addition to this unique configuration the polarity of the paddles was distinctive; the player would pull back on the pitch lever to bend the pitch sharp, and push forward to bend flat.

== Notable OB-X users ==
- Eurythmics (on "Sweet Dreams (Are Made of This)")
- John Foxx
- Japan
- Jean-Michel Jarre
- Nena
- OMD
- Queen (on The Game and Flash Gordon)
- Tangerine Dream
- Ultravox
- Youth

== Hardware re-issues and recreations ==
In May 2022, the Oberheim OB-X8, a new 8-voice analog synthesizer with the voice architecture and filters of four classic Oberheim models: the OB-X, OB-SX, OB-Xa, and OB-8, along with functionality and features not included on the original models, was announced. The new synthesizer is manufactured by Sequential in partnership with Tom Oberheim.
