= Piano & a Microphone Tour =

2016 concert tour by Prince

- Final tour by Prince
- Concert poster with all the (initial) tour dates
- Location: Australia; New Zealand; North America
- Associated album: HITnRUN Phase One; HITnRUN Phase Two
- Start date: January 20, 2016
- End date: April 14, 2016
- Legs: 2
- No. of shows: 22 (27 scheduled)

Prince concert chronology
- Hit and Run Tour (2014–15); Piano & a Microphone Tour (2016)

The Piano & a Microphone Tour was the final concert tour by American recording artist Prince. In a December 2015 interview in anticipation of the tour, he said that "I'm doing it to challenge myself, I won't know what songs I'm going to do when I go on stage. I won't have to, because I won't have a band". It was ultimately Prince's final tour due to his sudden death at age 57, from a fentanyl overdose on April 21, 2016, one week after the last tour date.

== Personnel ==
- Prince – vocals and piano

== Set list ==
Setlist of show in Melbourne:

Early show

1. "Big City"
2. "Ruff Enuff"
3. "Little Red Corvette" / "Dirty Mind"
4. "The Dawn"
5. "Money Don't Matter 2 Night"
6. "Waiting in Vain" / "If I Was Your Girlfriend"
7. "How Come U Don't Call Me Anymore?"
8. "The Ladder"
9. "1000 X's & O's"
10. "When She Comes"
11. "Satisfied"
12. "I Love U in Me"
13. "Automatic"
14. "Sometimes It Snows in April" (contains elements of "Purple Rain")
15. "The Beautiful Ones"
16. "Raspberry Beret"
17. "Starfish and Coffee"
18. "Paisley Park"
  Encore
19. "Adore"

Late show

1. "The Love We Make"
2. "Over the Rainbow"
3. "Batman Theme"
4. "Big City"
5. "Ruff Enuff"
6. "Little Red Corvette" / "Dirty Mind"
7. "The Ballad of Dorothy Parker" (contains elements of "Four")
8. "The Max"
9. "I Wanna Be Your Lover"
10. "Do Me, Baby"
11. "Sweet Thing"
12. "How Come U Don't Call Me Anymore"
13. "Waiting in Vain" / "If I Was Your Girlfriend"
14. "The Ladder"
15. "The Beautiful Ones"
16. "1000 X's & O's"
17. "Black Muse"
18. "Raspberry Beret"
  Encore
19. "Starfish and Coffee"
20. "Paisley Park"
21. "Purple Rain"

Set list of the 14 April 2016 show at the Fox Theater, Atlanta, GA, US

1. ”Confluence” (pre-recorded intro)
2. “When Will We B Paid?”
3. “The Max”
4. “Black Sweat”
5. “Girl”
6. “I Would Die 4 U”
7. “Baby I’m a Star”
8. “The Ballad of Dorothy Parker/Four”
9. “Dark"
10. "Indifference"
11. “Eye Love U, But Eye Don't Trust U Anymore"
12. “Little Red Corvette/Dirty Mind/Linus and Lucy”
13. “Nothing Compares 2 U”
14. “Cream”
15. “Black Muse”
16. “How Come U Don’t Call Me Anymore?”
17. “Waiting in Vain\If I Was Your Girlfriend”
18. “Sometimes It Snows in April”
19. “Purple Rain”
20. “The Beautiful Ones”
21. “Diamonds and Pearls”
22. Purple Rain (coda)

Notes

- The first show on February 16, in Melbourne, Australia, Prince dedicated performances of "Little Red Corvette", "Dirty Mind", "The Ladder", "The Beautiful Ones" and "Adore" in special tribute to Vanity, who died on February 15, 2016. He also shared memorable heart-felt stories when they were together. Prince also performed "The Dawn", an unreleased track from 1984 seemingly in connection with the passing of Vanity.
- The final show of the tour on April 14 at Fox Theatre was meant to be released as a live album, “Piano & a Microphone”. Prince announced during his last public appearance at Paisley Park Studios on April 17 (a.m.) that the full show had been mixed for a live release. .

On Prince’s X page (@prnlegacy) on April 18, his final post before his death on April 21, was the cover of the album and a link to Electric Fetus’s website. . The live recording of “Black Sweat” would be released the same day on Tidal as the Purple Pick of the Week, making it Prince’s final release before his death.

== Shows ==
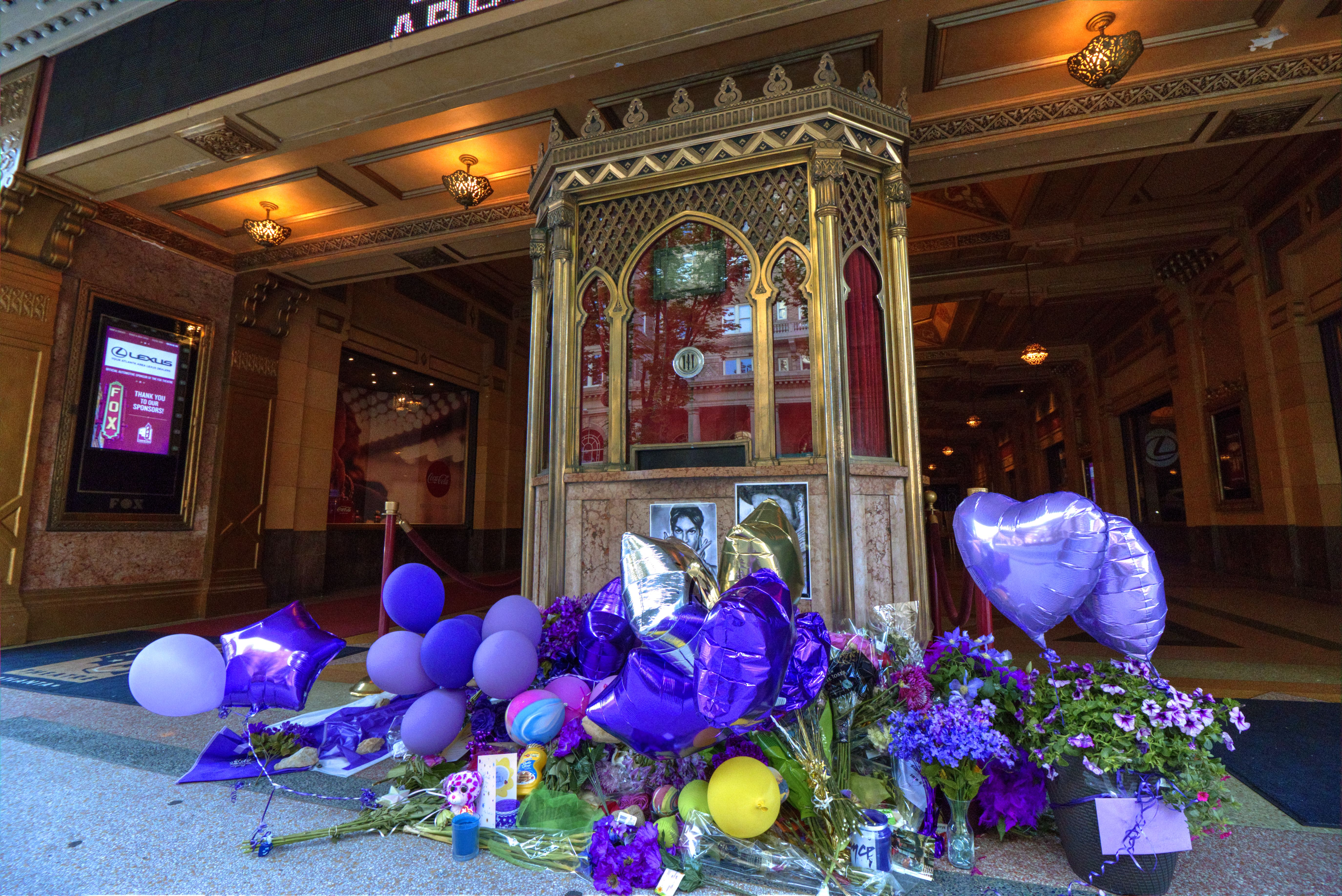
A makeshift memorial for Prince at the Fox Theatre in Atlanta, April 24. The theater was the site of Prince's last performance before his death on April 21.

List of 2016 concerts
Date	City	Country	Venue
January 21, 2016	Minneapolis	United States	Paisley Park; Two shows
February 16, 2016	Melbourne	Australia	State Theatre; Two shows each evening
February 17, 2016	Melbourne	Australia	State Theatre; Two shows each evening
February 20, 2016	Sydney	Australia	Sydney Opera House; Two shows
February 21, 2016	Sydney	Australia	State Theatre; Two shows
February 24, 2016	Auckland	New Zealand	ASB Theatre; Two shows
February 25, 2016	Perth	Australia	Perth Arena
February 28, 2016	Oakland	United States	Paramount Theatre; Two shows
March 4, 2016	Oakland	United States	Oracle Arena
March 21, 2016	Montreal	Canada	Théâtre Maisonneuve; Two shows
March 25, 2016	Toronto	Canada	Sony Centre for the Performing Arts; Two shows
April 14, 2016	Atlanta	United States	Fox Theatre; Two shows

Cancellations and/or rescheduled shows

April 7, 2016	Atlanta	Fox Theatre	Rescheduled to April 14, 2016
December 11, 2015	Paris, France	Opéra Garnier	Deprogramming for the November 2015 Paris attacks

Prince was also scheduled to perform in the UK, including the Theatre Royal Drury Lane in London, Glasgow, and Birmingham. However, these were cancelled due to ticket touts and the Paris attacks.

=== Box office score data ===
Box office score data
Venue	City	Tickets Sold / Available	Gross Revenue
Perth Arena	Perth	12,057 / 13,206 (91%)	$1,554,860
Paramount Theatre	Oakland	5,668 / 5,792 (98%)	$1,244,813
Oracle Arena	Oakland	16,940 / 17,324 (98%)	$2,707,586
Fox Theatre	Atlanta	9,022 / 9,162 (98%)	$1,811,410
