= Prince (musician) =

American musician and songwriter (1958–2016)

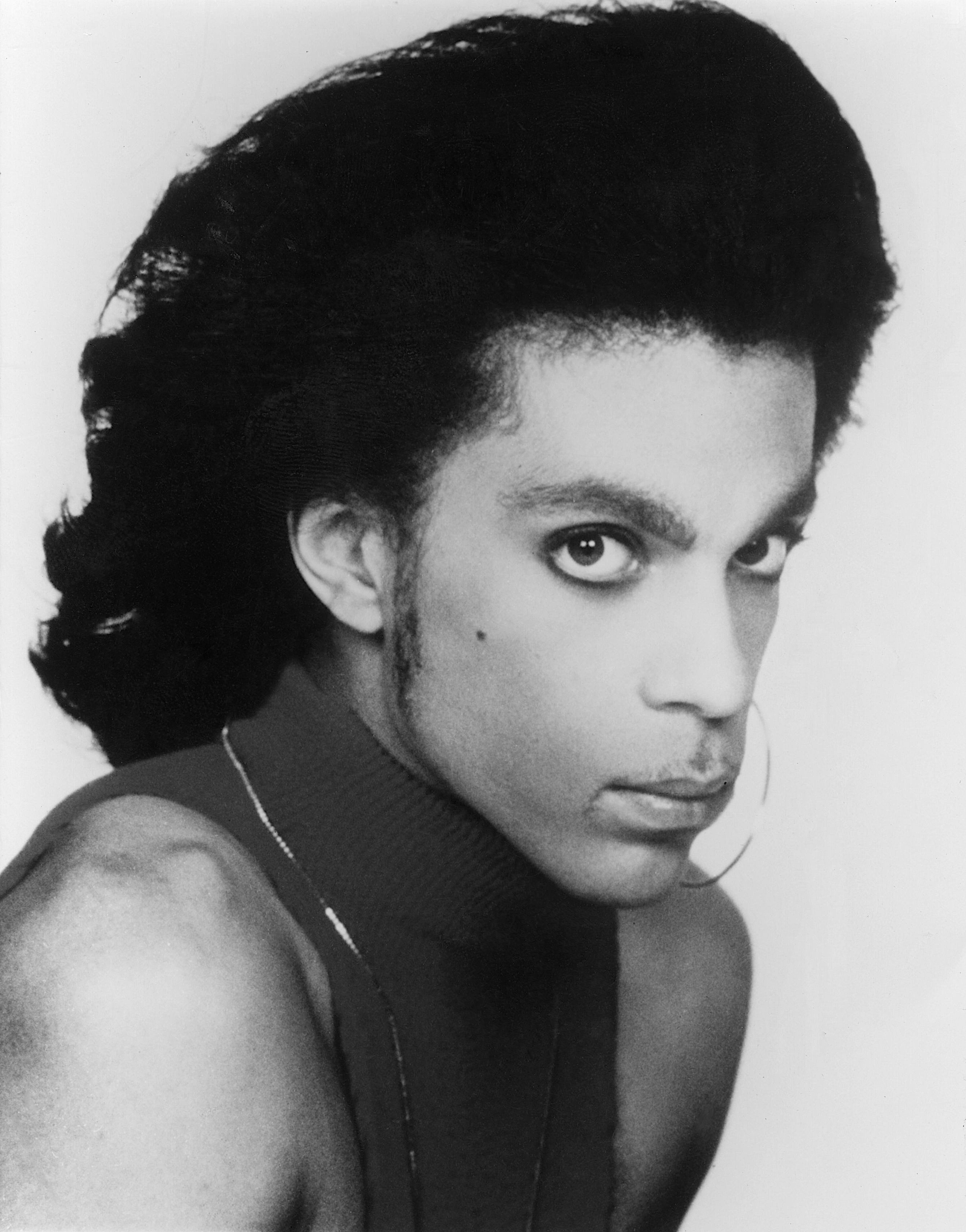
- Prince in 1988
- Born: Prince Rogers Nelson; June 7, 1958; Minneapolis, Minnesota, U.S.
- Died: April 21, 2016 (aged 57); Paisley Park, Chanhassen, Minnesota, U.S.
- Cause of death: Accidental fentanyl overdose
- Burial place: Paisley Park, Chanhassen, Minnesota
- Other names: The Artist Formerly Known as Prince (TAFKAP); Camille
- Occupations: Singer; musician; songwriter; record producer; dancer; actor; filmmaker
- Years active: 1975–2016
- Spouses: Mayte Garcia (m. 1996; div. 2000); Manuela Testolini (m. 2001; div. 2007)
- Children: 1
- Father: John L. Nelson
- Relatives: Tyka Nelson (sister)
- Musical career
- Genres: Minneapolis sound; R&B; funk; rock; pop; soul; neo-psychedelia
- Instruments: Vocals; guitar; piano; keyboards; bass; drums; percussion
- Works: Albums; singles; unreleased projects
- Labels: Warner Bros.; Paisley Park; NPG; EMI; Columbia; Arista; Universal
- Formerly of: The Revolution; The Family; Madhouse; New Power Generation
- Website: prince.com

Prince Rogers Nelson (June 7, 1958 – April 21, 2016) was an American singer, songwriter, musician, dancer, actor, and filmmaker. Often credited as one of the greatest musicians of his generation, he pioneered the Minneapolis sound and was influential in the evolution of various other genres. With estimated sales exceeding 100 million records, Prince is one of the best-selling music artists of all time.

Born and raised in Minneapolis, Minnesota, Prince signed a record deal with Warner Bros. Records at age 18, and released his first album, For You, two years later. He achieved critical success with the albums Dirty Mind (1980), Controversy (1981), and 1999 (1982). In 1984, Prince became the first singer to simultaneously have a number-one film, album and single in the United States, with Purple Rain, its soundtrack, and "When Doves Cry". The album, recorded with his new backing band the Revolution, spent 24 consecutive weeks at number one on the U.S. Billboard 200 and won the Academy Award for Best Original Song Score. After disbanding the Revolution, Prince released the double LP, Sign o' the Times (1987), widely considered his greatest work.

In 1993, in the midst of a contractual dispute with Warner Bros., Prince changed his stage name to the unpronounceable symbol, known to fans as the "Love Symbol". Prince was often referred to as the Artist Formerly Known as Prince (TAFKAP), or simply the Artist. After signing a contract with Arista Records in 1999, Prince reverted to his original name in 2000 and continued releasing albums, including the double Grammy Award-winning Musicology (2004). He released 39 albums during his life, while still having a vast array of unreleased material. On April 21, 2016, at the age of 57, Prince died at his Paisley Park home and recording studio in Chanhassen, Minnesota, after accidentally overdosing on counterfeit hydrocodone/paracetamol pills which were laced with fentanyl.

Prince's awards include the Grammy President's Merit Award, the American Music Awards for Achievement and of Merit, the Billboard Icon Award, an Academy Award, and a Golden Globe Award. He was inducted into the Rock and Roll Hall of Fame in 2004, the Rhythm and Blues Music Hall of Fame in 2016, the Songwriters Hall of Fame in 2024, and twice into the Black Music & Entertainment Walk of Fame in 2022. Rolling Stone ranked him among the greatest artists, greatest singers and greatest songwriters of all time; the magazine also listed 1999, Purple Rain and Sign o' the Times among the greatest albums in history.

== Life and career ==
=== 1958–1975: Early life ===
Prince Rogers Nelson was born at Mount Sinai Hospital in Minneapolis, Minnesota, on June 7, 1958, to jazz singer Mattie Della (née Shaw) and pianist and songwriter John Lewis Nelson. All four of Prince's grandparents were from Louisiana. The jazz drummer Louis Hayes was his paternal cousin.

Prince was named after his father's most popular stage name, Prince Rogers, which he used while performing with Della in a jazz group named the Prince Rogers Trio. In 1991, Prince's father told A Current Affair that he named his son "Prince" because he wanted Prince "to do everything I wanted to do". Prince was not fond of his name during his childhood and called himself "Skipper" instead. Prince said he was "born epileptic" and had seizures when he was young. He stated, "my mother told me one day I walked in to her and said, 'Mom, I'm not going to be sick anymore,' and she said, 'Why?' and I said, 'Because an angel told me so.'" Prince's younger sister, Tyka, was born on May 18, 1960. Both siblings developed a keen interest in music, which was encouraged by their father. His parents were both members of the Seventh-day Adventist Church, a Protestant Church.

Prince wrote his first song, titled "Funk Machine", on his father's piano when he was seven years old. His parents divorced when he was ten. His mother then married Hayward Baker, whom Prince credited with improving the family's finances. Prince's mother and Baker had a son named Omarr. Prince had a fraught relationship with Omarr, to the extent that it caused him to repeatedly switch homes, sometimes living with his father and sometimes with his mother and stepfather. Baker took Prince to see James Brown in concert. After a brief period of living with his father, who bought him his first guitar, Prince moved into the basement of his neighbors, the Anderson family, after his father threw him out. He befriended the Andersons' son, André Cymone, who would later work with Prince.

Prince briefly attended Minneapolis's Bryant Junior High, after which he moved to Central High School, where he played football, basketball, and baseball. He played on Central's junior varsity basketball team and continued to recreationally play basketball as an adult. He was trained in classical ballet at the Minnesota Dance Theatre through the Urban Arts Program of Minneapolis Public Schools. Prince became an advocate for dancers, and used his wealth to save the failing Joffrey Ballet in Chicago during the 1990s.

=== 1975–1980: Career beginnings and breakthrough ===
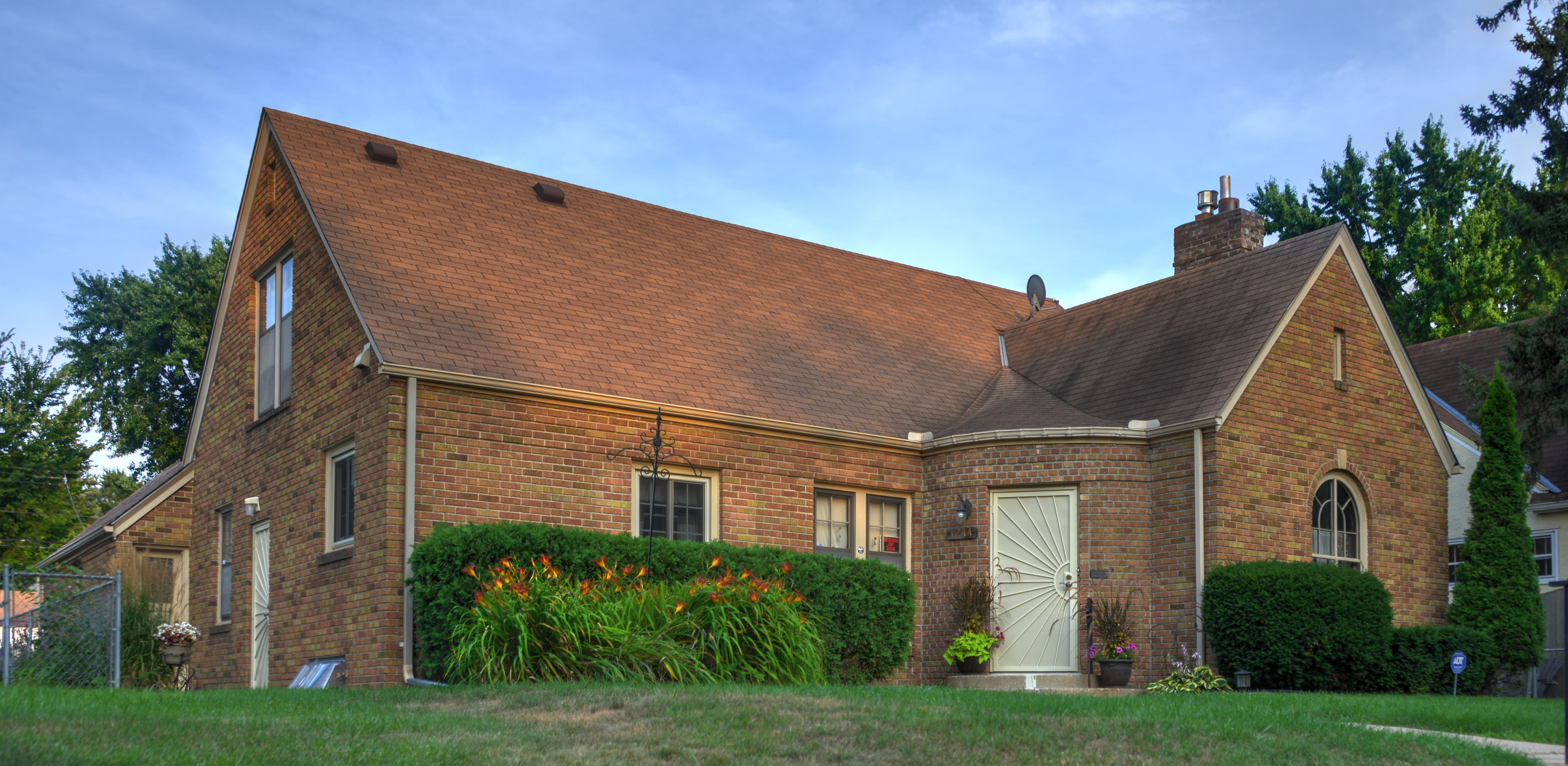
The Minneapolis house, seen here in August 2017, where Prince stayed with André Cymone's family

In 1975, Pepe Willie, the husband of one of Prince's cousins, formed the band 94 East with Marcy Ingvoldstad and Kristie Lazenberry, hiring André Cymone and Prince to record tracks. Willie wrote the songs, with Prince contributing guitar tracks, both of them co-writing "Just Another Sucker". The band recorded tracks which later appeared in the album Minneapolis Genius – The Historic 1977 Recordings. In 1976, shortly after graduating from Central High School, Prince created a demo tape with producer Chris Moon, in Moon's Minneapolis studio. Unable to secure a recording contract, Moon brought the tape to Owen Husney, a Minneapolis businessman. Husney signed Prince, then aged 19, to a management contract, and helped him create a demo at Sound 80 Studios in Minneapolis, with producer/engineer David Z. The demo recording, along with a press kit produced at Husney's ad agency, resulted in interest from several record companies, including Warner Bros. Records, A&M Records, and Columbia Records.

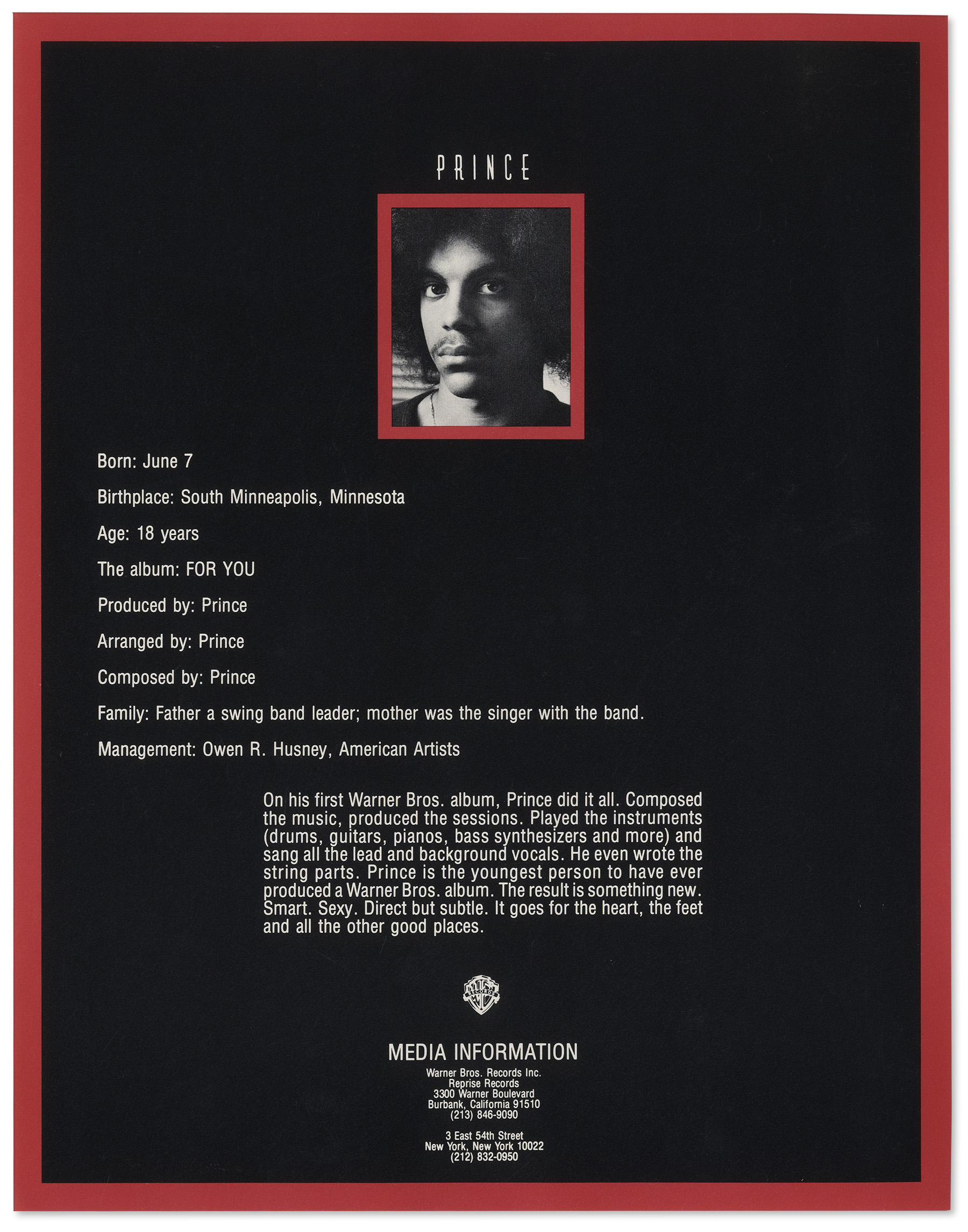
The one sheet published by Warner Bros. Records to promote For You (Note: Prince was 19 years old when For You was released, not 18 as the sheet states.)

With the help of Husney, Prince signed a recording contract with Warner Bros. Records in 1977. The record company agreed to give Prince creative control for three albums and retain his publishing rights. Husney and Prince then left Minneapolis and moved to Sausalito, California, where Prince's first album, For You, was recorded at Record Plant Studios. The album was mixed in Los Angeles and released on April 7, 1978. According to the liner notes of For You, Prince wrote, produced, arranged, composed, and played all 27 instruments on the recording, except for the song "Soft and Wet", whose lyrics were co-written by Chris Moon. In the United States, "Soft and Wet" reached number 12 on the Hot Soul Singles chart and number 92 on the Billboard Hot 100. The song "Just as Long as We're Together" reached number 91 on the Hot Soul Singles chart.

Around this time, a side enterprise that Prince began to pursue involved a then-teenage singer Sue Ann Carwell, where Prince hoped to mold her career as a solo artist after hearing her talented performances in the Minneapolis R&B scene. However, Carwell resisted his suggestion that she use the name "Susie Stone". Recordings he had been working on with her for a projected 1978 album, including "I'm Saving It Up", "Make It Through the Storm", "Since We've Been Together" and "Wouldn't You Love To Love Me?", went unreleased. Carwell was subsequently signed by Warner Bros. Records.

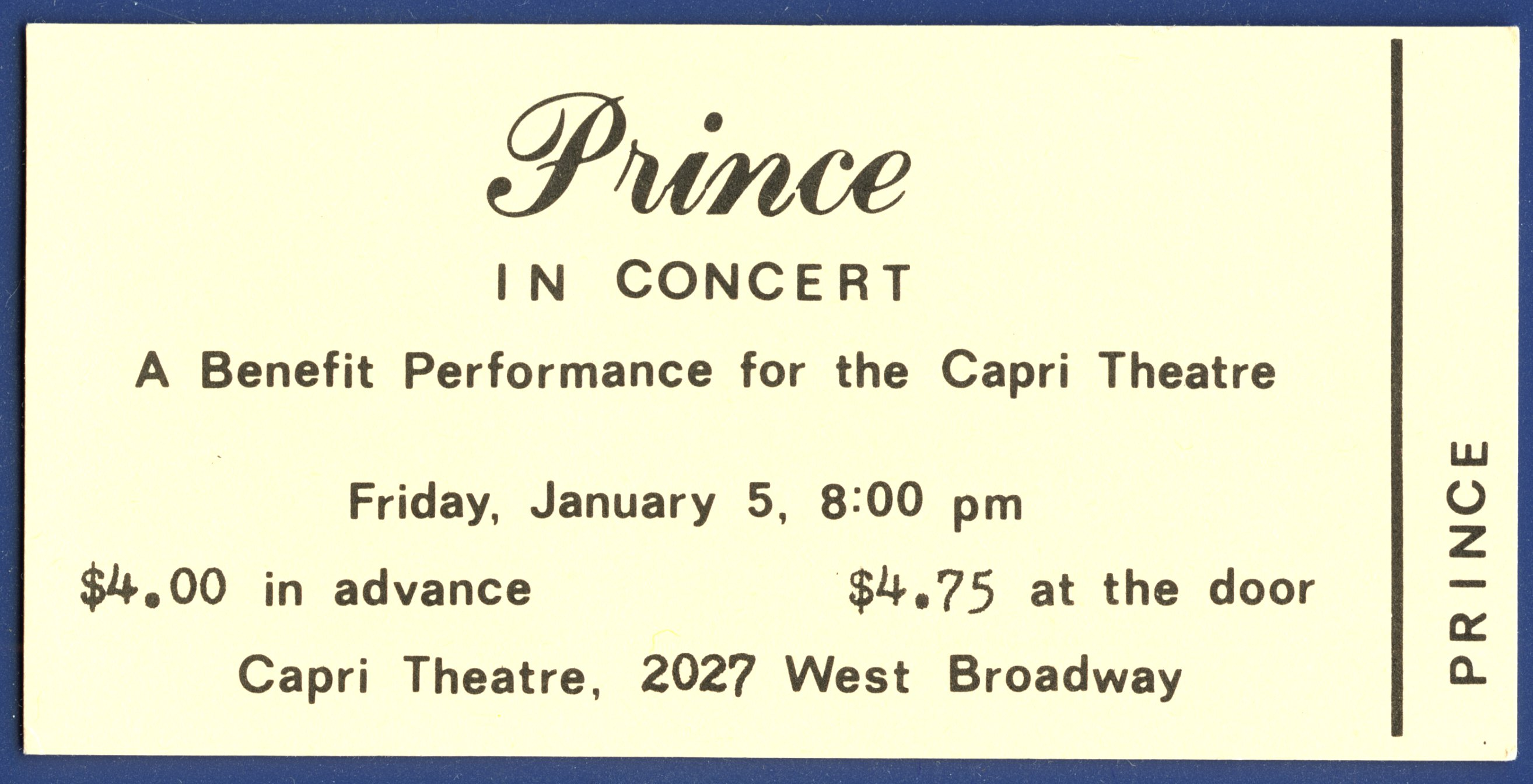
Ticket to Prince's first performance with his band in January 1979

In 1979, Prince formed his first band, with André Cymone on bass, Dez Dickerson on guitar, Gayle Chapman and Doctor Fink on keyboards, and Bobby Z. on drums. Their first show was at the Capri Theater on January 5, 1979. Warner Bros. executives attended the show but decided that Prince and the band needed more time to develop their music. In October 1979, Prince released the album Prince, which reached number three on the Billboard Top R&B/Hip-Hop Albums chart, number 22 on the Billboard 200, and was certified platinum. It contained two R&B hits: "Why You Wanna Treat Me So Bad?" and "I Wanna Be Your Lover", the latter of which sold more than a million copies, reached number 11 on the Billboard Hot 100, and stayed at number one on the Hot Soul Singles chart for two weeks. Prince performed both songs on The Midnight Special on January 8, 1980, and then on American Bandstand on January 26. In a review of Prince for The Village Voice dated March 31, music journalist Robert Christgau predicted, "This boy is going to be a big star, and he deserves it".

=== 1980–1983: Dirty Mind, Controversy, and 1999 ===
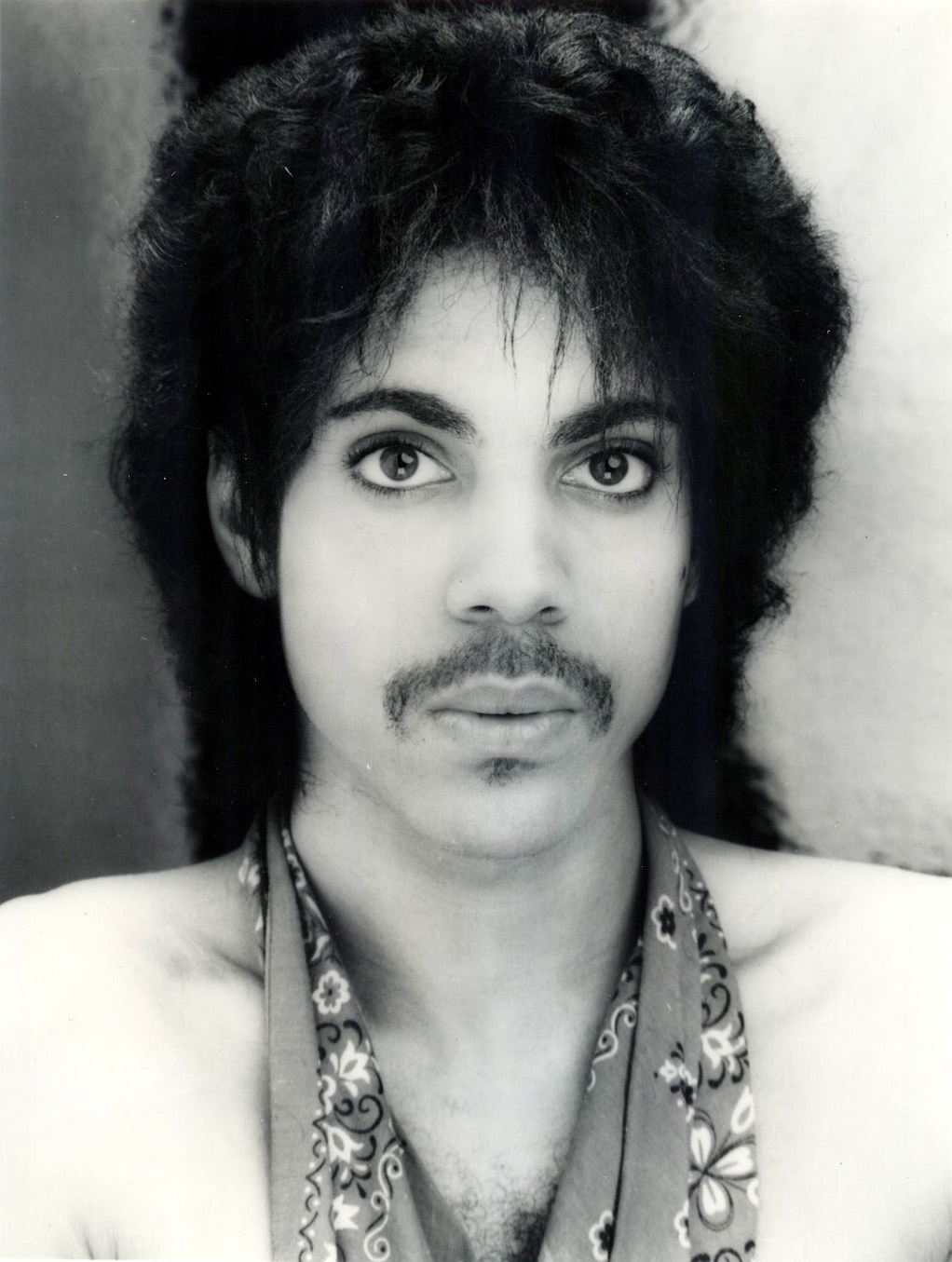
Prince in a promotional picture for Dirty Mind

In October 1980, Prince released the album Dirty Mind, which contained sexually explicit material, including the songs "Head" and "Sister", and was described by Stephen Thomas Erlewine as a "stunning, audacious amalgam of funk, new wave, R&B, and pop, fueled by grinningly salacious sex and the desire to shock". Recorded in Prince's studio, the album was certified gold, with the single "Uptown" reaching number five on the Billboard Dance chart and number five on the Hot Soul Singles chart. Prince was also the opening act for Rick James' 1980 Fire It Up tour. In February 1981, Prince made his first appearance on Saturday Night Live, performing "Partyup". In October 1981, Prince released the album Controversy. He played several dates in support of it, as the first of three opening acts for the Rolling Stones, on their United States tour. In Los Angeles, Prince, who appeared in a trench coat and black bikini briefs, was forced off the stage after just three songs by audience members throwing trash at him. The songs on Controversy were published by Controversy Music – ASCAP, a practice he continued until the Emancipation album in 1996. Controversy also marked the introduction of Prince's use of sensational spelling, such as writing the words "you" as "U", "to" as "2", and "for" as "4". By 2002, MTV News noted that "now all of his titles, liner notes, and Web postings are written in his own shorthand spelling, as seen on 1999's Rave Un2 the Joy Fantastic, which featured 'Hot Wit U.'"

In 1981, Prince formed a side project band called the Time. The band released four albums between 1981 and 1990, with Prince writing and performing most of the instrumentation and backing vocals—sometimes being credited under the pseudonyms "Jamie Starr" or "The Starr Company"—with lead vocals by Morris Day.

In late 1982, Prince released the double album 1999, which sold more than four million copies. The title track was a protest against nuclear proliferation and became Prince's first top-ten hit in countries outside the United States. Prince's "Little Red Corvette" was one of the first two videos by Black artists—along with Michael Jackson's "Billie Jean"—played in heavy rotation on MTV, which had been perceived as against "black music" until CBS President Walter Yetnikoff threatened to pull all CBS videos. Prince and Jackson had a competitive rivalry which lasted for many years. The song "Delirious" also placed in the top ten on the Billboard Hot 100 chart. "International Lover" earned Prince his first Grammy Award nomination at the 26th Annual Grammy Awards.

=== 1984–1987: Purple Rain, Around the World in a Day, and Parade ===
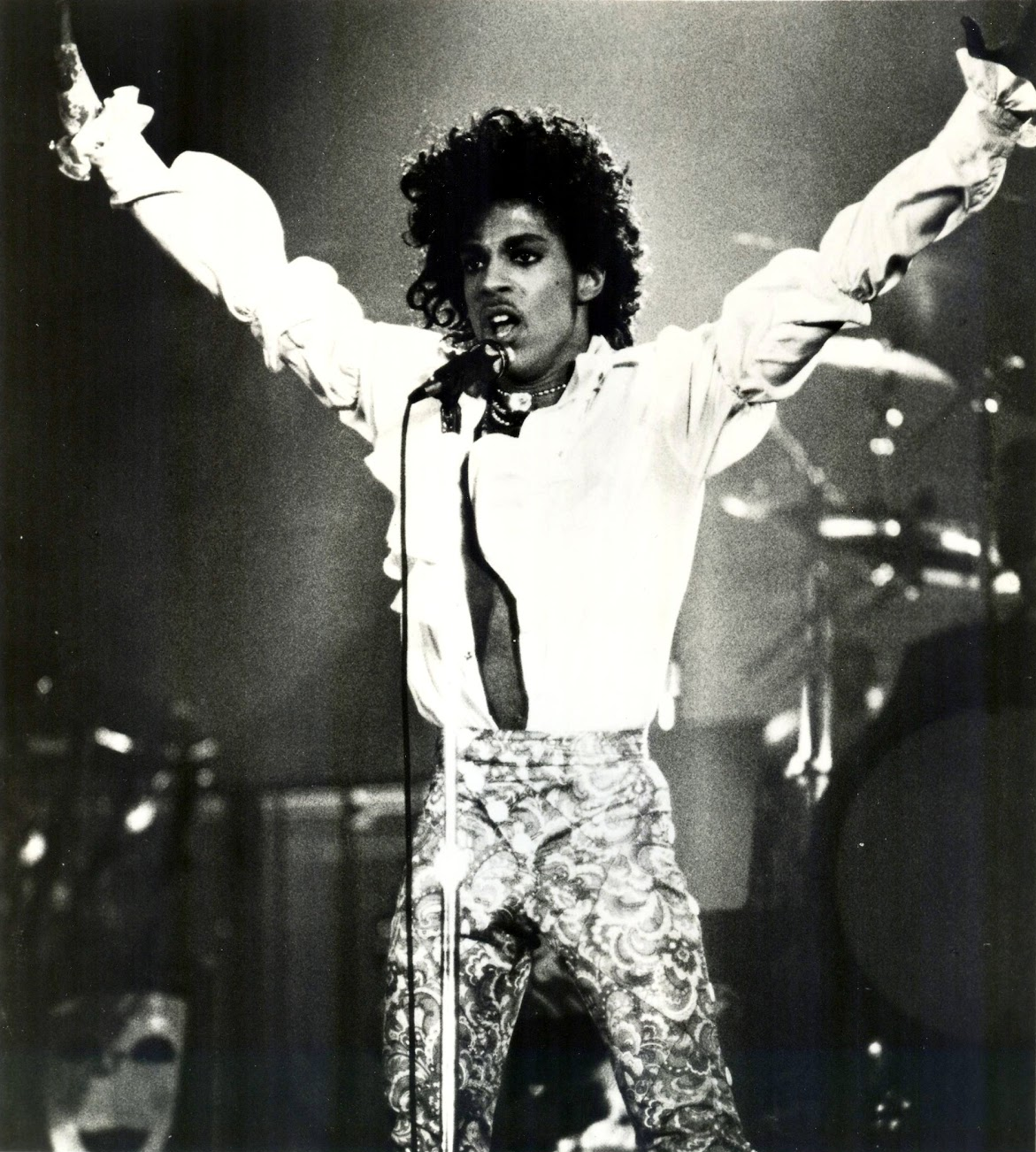
Prince performing during the Purple Rain Tour in 1984, which solely took place in the United States

Starting with the release of 1999, the backing band for Prince would be referred to as the Revolution. The band's name was printed in reverse on the cover of 1999 inside the letter "I" of the word "Prince". The band consisted of Lisa Coleman and Doctor Fink on keyboards, Bobby Z. on drums, Brown Mark on bass, and Dez Dickerson on guitar. Jill Jones, a backing singer, was also part of the lineup for the 1999 album and tour. Following the tour, Dickerson left the group for religious reasons. In the book Possessed: The Rise and Fall of Prince (2003), author Alex Hahn says that Dickerson was reluctant to sign a three-year contract and wanted to pursue other musical ventures. Dickerson was replaced by Coleman's friend Wendy Melvoin. At first, the band rarely played in studio recordings, but this gradually changed during 1983.

According to his former manager Bob Cavallo, in the early 1980s, Prince required his management to obtain a deal for him to star in a major motion picture, even though his exposure at that point was limited to several pop and R&B hits, music videos and occasional TV performances. In 1984, this resulted in the hit film Purple Rain—which starred Prince and was loosely autobiographical—and the eponymous studio album, which was also the soundtrack to the film. The album Purple Rain sold more than 13 million copies in the United States and spent 24 consecutive weeks at number one on the Billboard 200 chart. The film won Prince an Academy Award for Best Original Song Score and grossed more than $68 million in the U.S. (equivalent to $211 million in 2025) It is regarded as one of the greatest musical films of all time. Songs from the film were hits on pop charts around the world; "When Doves Cry" and "Let's Go Crazy" reached number one on the Billboard Hot 100, with the title track reaching number two. At one point, Prince simultaneously had the number-one album, single, and film in the United States, being the first person to achieve this feat. The album is ranked eighth in Rolling Stone's "500 Greatest Albums of All Time", and is also included on the list of Time's All-Time 100 Albums. The album also produced two of Prince's first three Grammy Awards earned at the 27th Annual Grammy Awards: Best Rock Performance by a Duo or Group with Vocal, and Best Score Soundtrack for Visual Media.

In 1984, pop artist Andy Warhol created the painting Orange Prince. Warhol was fascinated by Prince and ultimately created a total of twelve unique paintings of him in different colorways, all of which were kept in Warhol's personal collection. Four of these paintings are now in the collection of The Andy Warhol Museum in Pittsburgh. In November 1984, Vanity Fair published Warhol's portrait to accompany the article Purple Fame by Tristan Fox, and said that Warhol's silkscreen image of Prince with its pop colors captured Prince "at the height of his powers".

After Tipper Gore heard her 11-year-old daughter Karenna listening to Prince's song "Darling Nikki"—which gained wide notoriety for its sexual lyrics and a reference to masturbation—she founded the Parents Music Resource Center. The center advocated the mandatory use of a warning label, now known as Parental Advisory, on the covers of records that have been judged to contain language or lyrical content unsuitable for minors. The recording industry later voluntarily complied with this request.

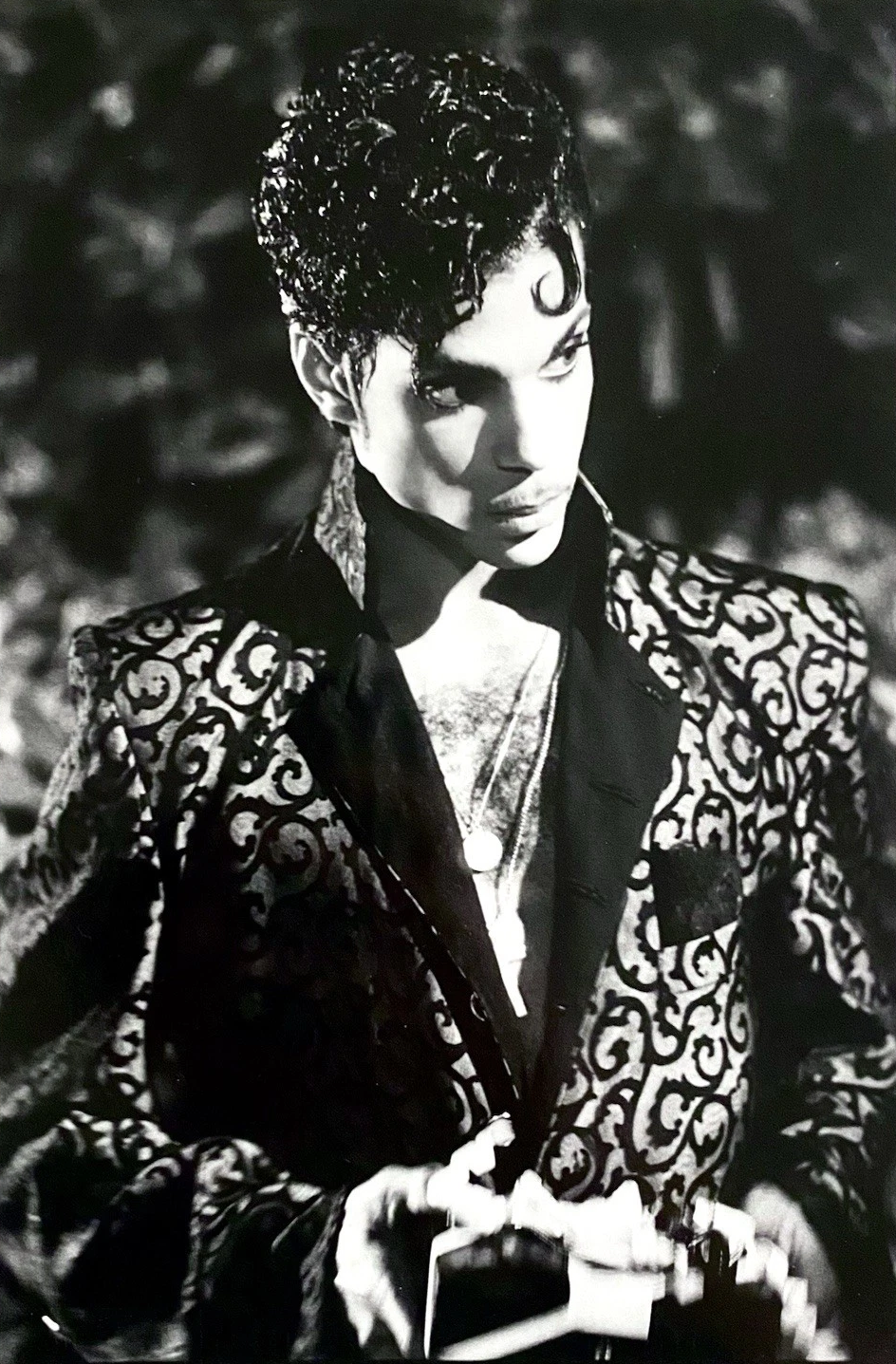
Prince in Under the Cherry Moon (1986)

In 1985, Prince released Around the World in a Day, which held the number-one spot on the Billboard 200 for three weeks. From that album, the single "Raspberry Beret" reached number two on the Billboard Hot 100, and "Pop Life" reached number seven. In 1986, his album Parade, the soundtrack for the movie Under the Cherry Moon released in the same year, reached number three on the Billboard 200 and number two on the R&B charts. The first single, "Kiss", reached number one on the Billboard Hot 100. In the same year, the song "Manic Monday", written by Prince and recorded by the Bangles, reached number two on the Hot 100 chart. Although the album went platinum and sold two million copies, the film received a Golden Raspberry Award for Worst Picture, tied with Howard the Duck, and Prince received Golden Raspberry Awards for Worst Director, Worst Actor, and Worst Original Song for the song "Love or Money". Some critics later re-evaluated Under the Cherry Moon after Prince's death and declared it a cult classic, comparing it to films such as 8½, Casablanca and It Happened One Night.

In 1986, Prince began a series of live performances called the Parade Tour. (Note: The tour was named the Hit n Run tour for the American leg of the tour.) After the tour, Prince disbanded the Revolution and fired Wendy Melvoin and Lisa Coleman. Brown Mark also quit the now-unnamed backing band, with only keyboardist Doctor Fink remaining. Following this, Miko Weaver, Atlanta Bliss, and Eric Leeds would join the band.

=== 1987–1989: Sign o' the Times and Lovesexy ===
Before disbanding the Revolution, Prince was working on two separate projects, an album with the Revolution titled Dream Factory, and a solo album named Camille. Unlike the three previous band albums, Dream Factory included input from the band members and featured songs with lead vocals by Wendy & Lisa. The Camille project saw Prince create a new androgynous persona primarily singing in a sped-up, female-sounding voice. With the dismissal of the Revolution, Prince consolidated material from both shelved albums, along with other songs, into a three-LP album to be titled Crystal Ball. Warner Bros. forced Prince to trim the triple album to a double album, releasing Sign o' the Times on March 31, 1987.

The album peaked at number six on the Billboard 200 albums chart. The first single, "Sign o' the Times", peaked at number three on the Hot 100. The follow-up single, "If I Was Your Girlfriend", charted at number 67 on the Hot 100 and reached number 12 on R&B chart. The third single, "U Got the Look", a duet with Sheena Easton, charted at number two on the Hot 100 and number 11 on the R&B chart, and the final single, "I Could Never Take the Place of Your Man", charted at number ten on the Hot 100 and number 14 on the R&B chart. Sign o' the Times was named the top album of the year by the Pazz & Jop critics' poll and sold 3.2 million copies. It performed well in Europe, with Prince promoting the album with a lengthy tour. Putting together a new backing band from the remnants of the Revolution, Prince added bassist Levi Seacer Jr., keyboardist Boni Boyer, and dancer/choreographer Cat Glover with drummer Sheila E. to the band, with Miko Weaver, Doctor Fink, Eric Leeds, Atlanta Bliss, and the Bodyguards (Wally Safford and Greg Brooks) remaining in the band for the Sign o' the Times Tour.

The Sign o' the Times tour was a success overseas, with Warner Bros. and Prince's managers wanting to bring it to the United States to promote sales of the album. Prince did not approve of a full United States tour, as he was ready to produce a new album. As a compromise, the last two nights of the tour were filmed for release in movie theaters. The film quality was deemed subpar, and reshoots were performed at Prince's Paisley Park studios. The film Sign o' the Times was released on November 20, 1987. The film received better reviews than Under the Cherry Moon, but its box-office receipts were minimal, and it quickly left theaters.

The next album intended for release was The Black Album. More instrumental and funk- and R&B-themed than previous albums, The Black Album also saw Prince experiment with hip-hop on the songs "Bob George" and "Dead on It". Prince was set to release the album with a monochromatic black cover with only the catalog number printed, but after 500,000 copies had been pressed, Prince had a spiritual epiphany that the album was "evil" and had it recalled. Surviving vinyl copies of the album have sold for upwards of $10 thousand.

Prince went back in the studio for eight weeks and recorded Lovesexy. Released on May 10, 1988, Lovesexy serves as a spiritual opposite to the dark The Black Album. Every song is a solo effort by Prince, except " No", which was recorded with his backing band. Lovesexy reached number 11 on the Billboard 200 and number five on the R&B albums chart. The lead single, "Alphabet St.", peaked at number eight on the Hot 100 and number three on the R&B chart, selling 750,000 copies. Prince again took his post-Revolution backing band, excluding the Bodyguards, on a three-leg, 84-show Lovesexy World Tour; although the shows were well-received by huge crowds, they failed to make a net profit due to the expensive sets and props.

=== 1989–1991: Batman and Graffiti Bridge ===
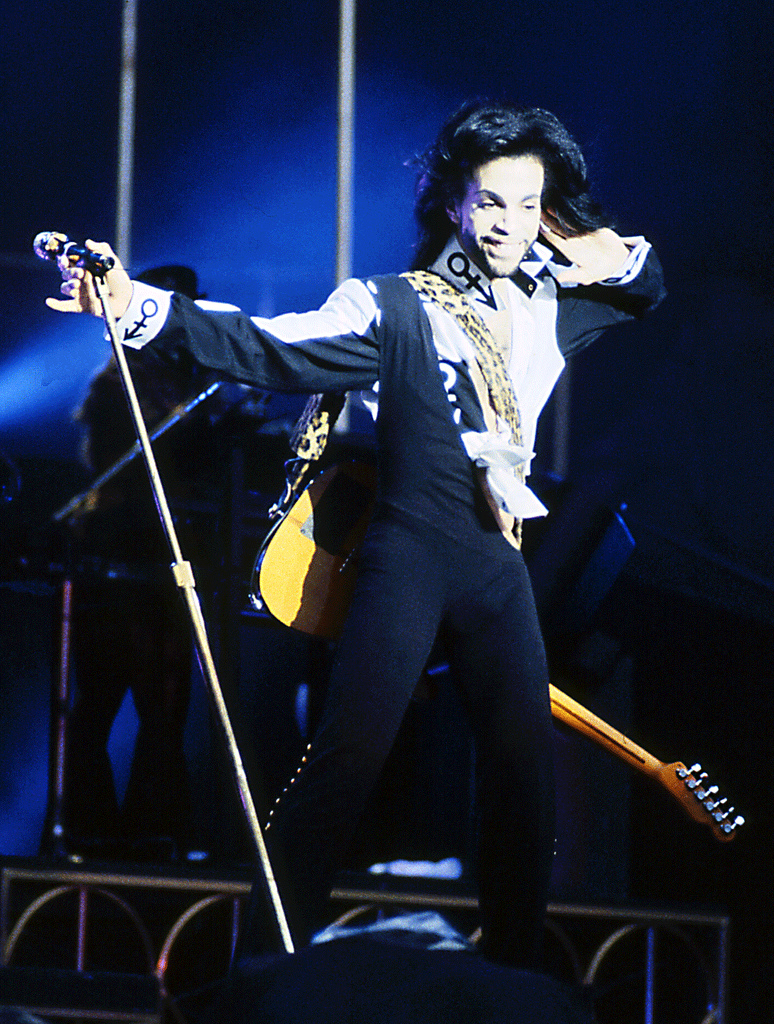
Prince performing during the Nude Tour in Tokyo, 1990

Prince appeared on Madonna's studio album Like a Prayer (1989), co-writing and singing the duet "Love Song" and playing electric guitar without being credited on the songs "Like a Prayer", "Keep It Together", and "Act of Contrition". He also began work on several musical projects, including Rave Unto the Joy Fantastic and early drafts of his Graffiti Bridge film, but both were put on hold when he was asked by Batman director Tim Burton to record several songs for the upcoming live-action movie adaptation. Prince went into the studio and produced an entire nine-track album, which was released on June 20, 1989.

The album Batman peaked at number one on the Billboard 200, selling 4.3 million copies. The single "Batdance" topped the Billboard Hot 100 and R&B charts. The single "The Arms of Orion", with Sheena Easton, charted at number 36, and "Partyman" charted at number 18 on the Hot 100 and at number five on the R&B chart, while the love ballad "Scandalous!" reached number five on the R&B chart. Prince had to sign away all publishing rights to the songs on the album to Warner Bros. as part of the deal to do the soundtrack.

In 1990, Prince went back on tour with a revamped band for his back-to-basics Nude Tour. With the departures of Boni Boyer, Sheila E., the Horns, and Cat, Prince brought in keyboardist Rosie Gaines, drummer Michael Bland, and dancing trio the Game Boyz (Tony M., Kirky J., and Damon Dickson). The European and Japanese tour was a financial success with a short, greatest hits setlist. In 1990, Prince finished production on his fourth film, Graffiti Bridge, and its eponymous soundtrack. Initially, Warner Bros. was reluctant to fund the film, but with Prince's assurances it would be a sequel to Purple Rain, as well as the involvement of the original members of the Time, the studio greenlit the project.

Released on August 20, 1990, the album reached number six on the Billboard 200 and R&B albums chart. The single "Thieves in the Temple" reached number six on the Hot 100 and number one on the R&B chart, with "Round and Round" placing at number 12 on the United States charts and number two on the R&B charts. The song featured the teenage Tevin Campbell on lead vocals, who also had a role in the film. The film, released on November 20, 1990, was a box-office flop, grossing $4.2 million. Miko Weaver and Doctor Fink, the last remaining members of the Revolution, would leave Prince's band shortly after.

=== 1991–1996: Name change, Diamonds and Pearls, and The Gold Experience ===
The unpronounceable symbol created by Prince in 1992 known as the "Love Symbol", which would later become his stage name

1991 began with a performance in Rock in Rio II, marking the debut of Prince's new band, the New Power Generation. With guitarist Miko Weaver and long-time keyboardist Doctor Fink leaving, Prince added bass player Sonny T., keyboard player Tommy Barbarella, and a brass section known as the Hornheads to the band, to go along with Levi Seacer, who would be taking over on guitar, Rosie Gaines, Michael Bland, and the Game Boyz. With significant input from his band members, Diamonds and Pearls was released on October 1, 1991. Reaching number three on the Billboard 200 album chart, Diamonds and Pearls saw four hit singles released in the United States. "Gett Off" peaked at number 21 on the Hot 100 and number six on the R&B charts, followed by "Cream", which gave Prince his fifth United States number-one single. The title track "Diamonds and Pearls" became the album's third single, reaching number three on the Hot 100 and the top spot on the R&B charts. "Money Don't Matter 2 Night" peaked at number 23 and number 14 on the Hot 100 and R&B charts respectively. The album Diamonds and Pearls would sell more than two million copies in the United States.

In 1992, following the success of Diamonds and Pearls, Prince renewed his contract with Warner Bros., agreeing to what was reportedly a $100 million deal to release six more albums with the label. In October, Prince released his 14th studio album, being the second to feature the New Power Generation. It bore only an unpronounceable symbol on the cover, which would later be copyrighted under the title "Love Symbol #2". It was preceded by the releases of the singles "Sexy MF" and "My Name Is Prince", which reached number 66 and number 36 respectively on the Billboard Hot 100. The third single, "7", would peak at number seven on the Billboard Hot 100. The album, later referred to as Love Symbol, peaked at number five on the Billboard 200 and went on to sell 2.8 million copies worldwide, falling short of expectations.

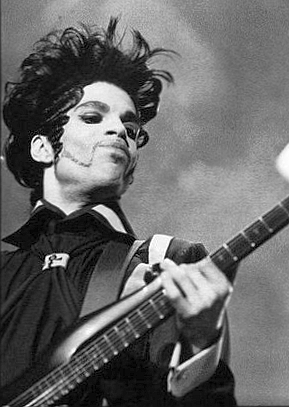
Prince performing at the Act I and II tour in Zürich, Switzerland, in 1993

In 1993, in rebellion against Warner Bros., which insisted upon releasing Prince's backlog of music at a steady pace, Prince formally adopted the symbol as his stage name. To use the symbol in print media, Warner Bros. organized a mass mailing of floppy disks with a custom font including the symbol. At this time, Prince was often referred to as "the Artist Formerly Known as Prince", or simply "the Artist". That year, Warner Bros. released the greatest hits compilation The Hits/The B-Sides. The first two discs were also sold separately as The Hits 1 and The Hits 2. The collection features the majority of Prince's hit singles, and several previously hard-to-find recordings, including B-sides from across Prince's career and previously unreleased tracks such as the Revolution-recorded "Power Fantastic" and a live recording of "Nothing Compares 2 U" with Rosie Gaines. Two new songs, "Pink Cashmere" and "Peach", were chosen as promotional singles.

In 1994, Warner Bros. allowed the single "The Most Beautiful Girl in the World" to be released via independent distributor Bellmark Records in February. The release reached number three on the United States Billboard Hot 100 and number one in many other countries. Prince began to release albums in quick succession as a means of releasing himself from his contractual obligations to Warner Bros. This led to the previously aborted Black Album being given a limited official release seven years after its initial recording. Prince pushed to have his next two albums, Come and The Gold Experience, released simultaneously. Warner Bros. accepted both albums, but delayed the release of The Gold Experience, fearing market saturation. In retaliation, Prince began making public appearances with "slave" written on his face. The Gold Experience would not be released until September 1995.

In 1996, the album Chaos and Disorder was released. Prince submitted another album, titled The Vault: Old Friends 4 Sale, to Warner Bros. that same year, completing his contract with the label. He left the label that same year, though the album would not be released until 1999.

=== 1996–2000: Emancipation, Crystal Ball, and Rave Un2 the Joy Fantastic ===
Free of any further contractual obligations to Warner Bros., Prince attempted a major comeback later that year with the release of Emancipation, a 36-song, three-CD set, with each disc being exactly 60 minutes long. The album was released via his own label, named NPG Records, with distribution through EMI. Emancipation was certified platinum by the RIAA. It is the first Prince record featuring covers of other artists' songs. Prince covered Joan Osborne's top ten hit song of 1995 "One of Us", Thom Bell and Linda Creed's "Betcha by Golly Wow!", James Allen Shamblin II and Michael Barry Reid's " Can't Make You Love Me", and Thom Bell and William Hart's "La-La (Means I Love You)".

Prince released Crystal Ball, a five-CD collection of unreleased material, in 1998. The distribution of this album was disorderly, with some fans pre-ordering the album on his website up to a year before it was shipped; these pre-orders were delivered months after the record had gone on sale in retail stores. Newpower Soul was released three months later.

In 1999, Prince once again signed with a major label, Arista Records, to release a new record, Rave Un2 the Joy Fantastic. The pay-per-view concert, Rave Un2 the Year 2000, was broadcast on December 31, 1999, and consisted of footage from the December 17 and 18 concerts of his 1999 tour. The concert featured appearances by guest musicians, including Lenny Kravitz, George Clinton, Jimmy Russell, and the Time. It was released to home video the following year.

=== 2000–2004: Internet releases and Musicology ===
On May 16, 2000, Prince stopped using the Love Symbol as his name, since his publishing contract with Warner Bros. had expired. For several years following the release of Rave Un2 the Joy Fantastic, Prince primarily released new music through his Internet subscription service, NPGOnlineLtd.com, which later became NPGMusicClub.com. The albums released during this period include remix album Rave In2 the Joy Fantastic and The Rainbow Children in 2001, One Nite Alone... in 2002, and Xpectation in 2003.

In 2001, Warner Bros. released a second compilation album, The Very Best of Prince, containing most of his commercially successful singles from the 1980s. In 2002, Prince released his first live album, One Nite Alone... Live!, which features performances from the One Nite Alone...Tour. The three-CD box set also includes a disc of "aftershow" music entitled It Ain't Over!.

On February 8, 2004, Prince appeared at the 46th Annual Grammy Awards with Beyoncé. In a performance that opened the show, they performed a medley of "Purple Rain", "Let's Go Crazy", "Baby I'm a Star", and Beyoncé's "Crazy in Love". The following month, Prince was inducted into the Rock and Roll Hall of Fame. The award was presented to him by Alicia Keys along with Big Boi and André 3000 of Outkast. As well as performing a trio of his own hits during the ceremony, Prince also participated in a tribute to fellow inductee George Harrison in a rendering of Harrison's "While My Guitar Gently Weeps", playing a two-minute guitar solo that ended the song. He also performed the song "Red House" as "Purple House" on the album Power of Soul: A Tribute to Jimi Hendrix.

In April 2004, Prince released Musicology through a one-album agreement with Columbia. The album rose as high as the top five on some international charts, including the U.S., UK, Germany, and Australia. The United States chart success was assisted by the CDs being included as part of the concert ticket purchase, thereby qualifying each CD to count toward United States chart placement. Three months later, Spin named him the greatest frontman of all time. That same year, Rolling Stone magazine named him as the highest-earning musician in the world, with an annual income of $56.5 million, largely due to his Musicology Tour, which Pollstar named as the top concert draw among musicians in the U.S. He played 96 concerts; the average ticket price for a show was US$61 (equivalent to US$104 in 2025). Musicology went on to receive two Grammy wins, for Best Male R&B Vocal Performance for "Call My Name" and Best Traditional R&B Vocal Performance for the title track. Musicology was also nominated for Best R&B Song and Best R&B Album, and "Cinnamon Girl" was nominated for Best Male Pop Vocal Performance. Rolling Stone ranked Prince number 27 on their list of the 100 Greatest Artists of All Time.

=== 2005–2007: 3121 ===
In April 2005, Prince played guitar, along with En Vogue singing backing vocals, on Stevie Wonder's single "So What the Fuss", Wonder's first since 1999. In late 2005, Prince signed with Universal Music Group to release the album 3121 on March 21, 2006. The first single was "Te Amo Corazón", the video for which was directed by actress Salma Hayek and filmed in Marrakesh, Morocco, with the video featuring Argentine actress and singer Mía Maestro. The video for the second single, "Black Sweat", was nominated at the MTV VMAs for Best Cinematography. The immediate success of 3121 gave Prince his first number-one debut on the Billboard 200.

To promote the new album, Prince was the musical guest on Saturday Night Live on February 4, 2006, 17 years after his last SNL appearance on the 15th-anniversary special, and nearly 25 years since his first appearance on a regular episode in 1981. At the 2006 Webby Awards on June 12, Prince received a Webby Lifetime Achievement Award in recognition of his "visionary use of the Internet to distribute music and connect with audiences", exemplified by his decision to release his album Crystal Ball (1998) exclusively online.

In July 2006, weeks after winning a Webby Award, Prince shut down his NPG Music Club website, after more than five years of operation. On the day of the music club's shutdown, a lawsuit was filed against Prince by the British company HM Publishing, who were the then-owners of the Nature Publishing Group, which was also abbreviated as NPG. Despite these events occurring on the same day, Prince's attorney stated that the site did not close due to the trademark dispute. Prince appeared at multiple award ceremonies in 2006: on February 15, he performed at the 2006 Brit Awards, along with Wendy & Lisa and Sheila E., and on June 27, Prince appeared at the 2006 BET Awards, where he was awarded Best Male R&B Artist. Prince performed a medley of Chaka Khan songs for Khan's BET Lifetime Achievement Award.

In November 2006, Prince was inducted into the UK Music Hall of Fame; he appeared to collect his award but did not perform. Also in November 2006, Prince opened a nightclub called 3121, in Las Vegas at the Rio All Suite Hotel and Casino. He performed weekly on Friday and Saturday nights until April 2007, when his contract with the Rio ended. On August 22, 2006, Prince released Ultimate, a greatest-hits album. The double-disc set contains one CD of previous hits, and another of extended versions and mixes of material that had largely only previously been available on B-sides. That same year, Prince wrote and performed a song for the hit animated film Happy Feet (2006). The song, "The Song of the Heart", appears on the film's soundtrack, which also features a cover of Prince's earlier hit "Kiss", sung by Nicole Kidman and Hugh Jackman. In January 2007, "The Song of the Heart" won a Golden Globe for Best Original Song.

=== 2007–2010: Super Bowl XLI show, Planet Earth, and Lotusflower ===
On February 4, 2007, Prince played at the Super Bowl XLI halftime show in Miami, on a large stage in the shape of his symbol. The event was broadcast to 140 million television viewers, his biggest-ever audience. His 12-minute performance in the rain began with an intro of the Queen song "We Will Rock You" and concluded with "Purple Rain". In 2015, Billboard ranked it the greatest Super Bowl performance ever.

Prince played 21 concerts at the O_{2} Arena in London during the Earth Tour in mid-2007. Tickets for the 20,000-capacity venue were capped by Prince at £31.21 ($48.66). Featuring Maceo Parker in his band, Prince's residency at the O_{2} Arena was increased to 15 nights after all 140,000 tickets for the original seven sold out in 20 minutes, before it was then further extended to 21 nights.

Prince performed with Sheila E. at the 2007 ALMA Awards. On June 28, the Mail on Sunday stated that it had made a deal to give Prince's new album, Planet Earth, away for free with the paper, being the first to publish it. This sparked controversy among music distributors and also led the UK arm of Prince's distributor, Sony BMG, to withdraw from distributing the album in UK stores. The UK's largest high street music retailer, HMV, stocked the paper on release day due to the giveaway. On July 7, 2007, Prince returned to Minneapolis to perform three shows. He performed concerts at the Macy's Auditorium on Nicollet Mall, the Target Center arena, and First Avenue.

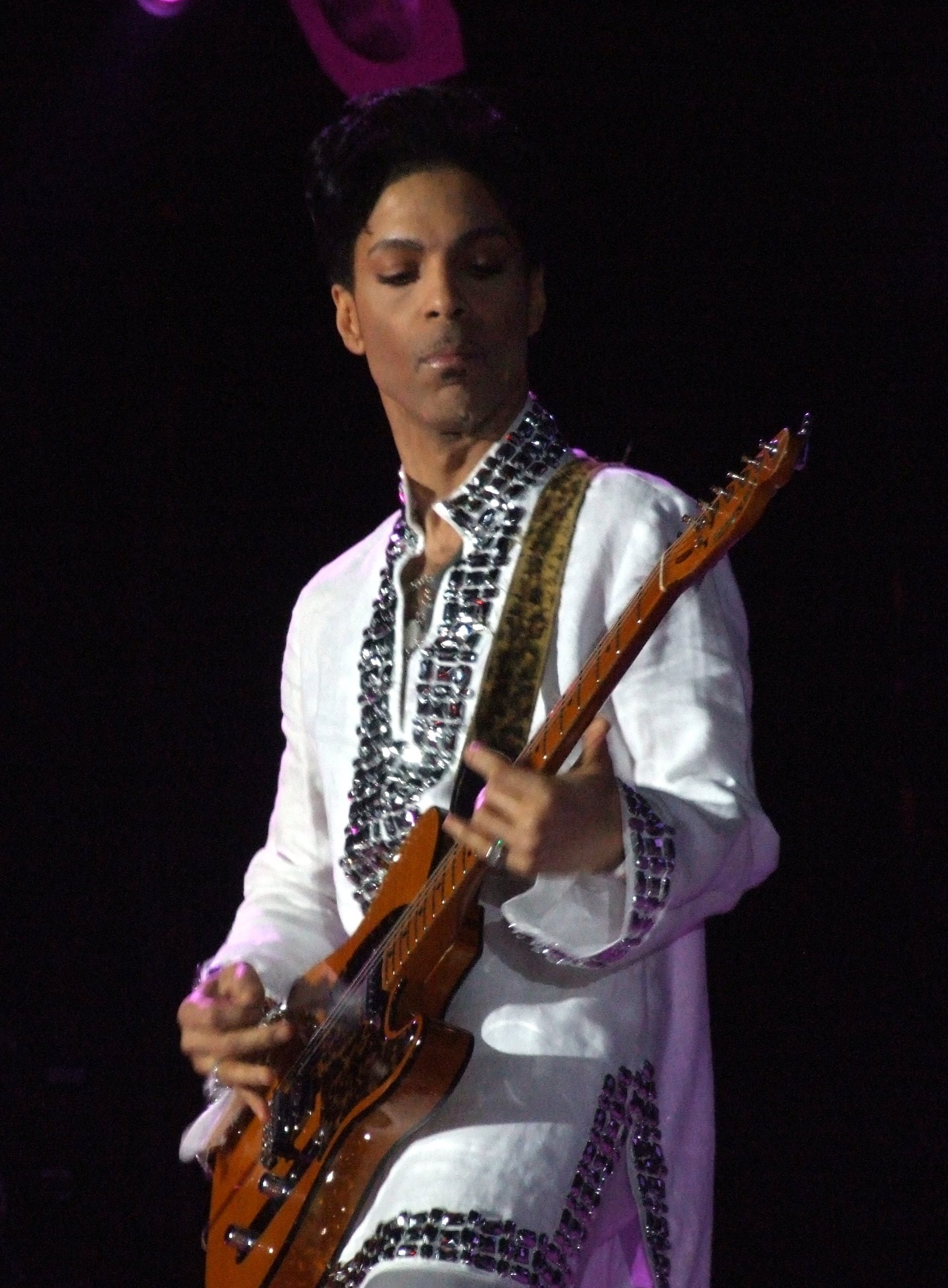
Prince at the Coachella Festival in 2008

On April 25, 2008, Prince performed on The Tonight Show with Jay Leno, where he debuted a new song, "Turn Me Loose". Days after, he headlined the 2008 Coachella Festival. Prince was paid more than $5 million for his performance at Coachella, according to Reuters. Prince canceled a concert, planned at Dublin's Croke Park on June 16, 2008, at 10 days' notice. In October 2009, promoters MCD Productions went to court to sue him for €1.6 million to refund 55,126 tickets. Prince settled the case out of court in February 2010 for $2.95 million. During the trial, it was said that Prince had been offered $22 million for seven concerts as part of a proposed 2008 European tour. In October 2008, Prince released a live album entitled Indigo Nights, a collection of songs performed live at aftershows in the O_{2} Arena.

Prince premiered four songs from his new album on LA's indie rock radio station Indie 103.1 on December 18, 2008. The radio station's programmers Max Tolkoff and Mark Sovel had been invited to Prince's home to hear the new rock-oriented music. Prince gave them a CD with four songs to premiere on their radio station. The music debuted the next day on Jonesy's Jukebox, hosted by former Sex Pistol Steve Jones.

On January 3, 2009, the website LotusFlow3r.com was launched, streaming and selling some of the recently aired material and concert tickets. On January 31, Prince released two more songs on LotusFlow3r.com: "Disco Jellyfish", and "Another Boy". "Chocolate Box", "Colonized Mind", and "All This Love" were later released on the website. Prince released a triple album set containing the album Lotusflow3r, MPLSoUND, and an album credited to Bria Valente, called Elixer, on March 24, 2009, followed by a physical release on March 29. On July 18, Prince performed two shows at the Montreux Jazz Festival, backed by the New Power Generation, including Rhonda Smith, Renato Neto and John Blackwell. On October 11, 2009, he gave two surprise concerts at the Grand Palais in Paris. On October 12, he gave another surprise performance at La Cigale. On October 24, Prince played a concert at Paisley Park.

=== 2010–2016: Final years, 20Ten, Hit n Run Phase One, and Hit n Run Phase Two ===
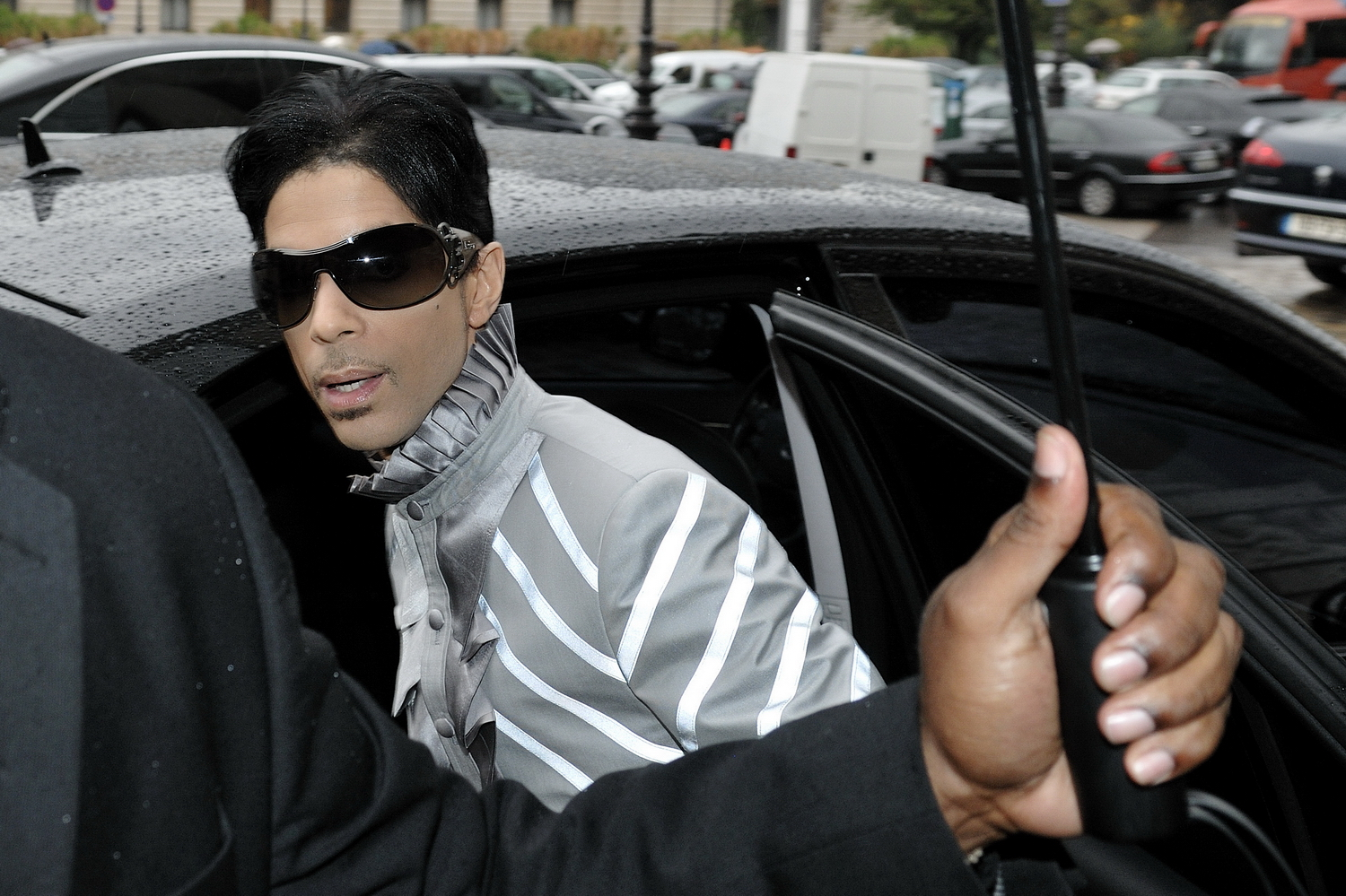
Prince photographed by paparazzi in Paris, 2009

In January 2010, Prince wrote a new song, "Purple and Gold", inspired by his visit to a Minnesota Vikings football game against the Dallas Cowboys. The following month, he let Minneapolis–St. Paul public radio station 89.3 The Current premiere his new song "Cause and Effect" as a gesture in support of independent radio.

In 2010, Prince was included in Time's annual list of the 100 most influential people. He released a new single on 89.3 The Current called "Hot Summer" on June 7, his 52nd birthday. The same month, Prince appeared on the cover of the July 2010 issue of Ebony magazine, and he received the Lifetime Achievement Award at the 2010 BET Awards.

Prince released his thirty-fifth album, 20Ten, in July 2010 as a free covermount with publications in the UK, Belgium, Germany, and France. He refused album access to digital download services and closed LotusFlow3r.com. On July 4, 2010, Prince began his 20Ten Tour, a concert tour in two legs, with shows in Europe. The second leg began on October 15 and ended with a concert following that year's Abu Dhabi Grand Prix on November 14. The second half of the tour had a new band, with John Blackwell, Ida Kristine Nielsen, and previous band member Sheila E. He embarked on the Welcome 2 Tour on December 15, 2010. Purple Rain was inducted into the Grammy Hall of Fame on December 7, 2010.

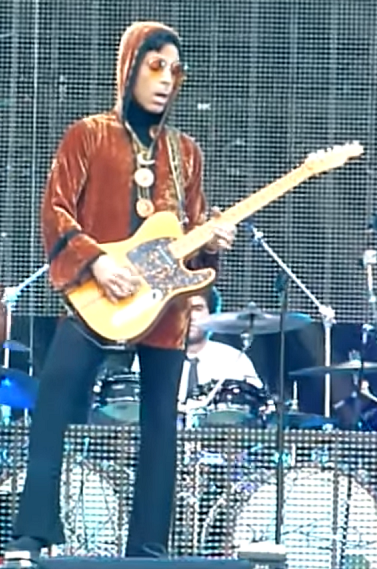
Prince performing in Paris in 2011

Prince presented Barbra Streisand with the MusiCares Person of the Year award and donated $1.5 million to charities on February 12, 2011. He headlined the Hop Farm Festival on July 3, 2011, marking his first UK show since 2007 and his first-ever UK festival appearance. Despite having previously rejected the Internet for music distribution, on November 24, 2011, he released a reworked version of the previously unreleased song "Extraloveable" through both iTunes and Spotify. Purple Music, a Switzerland-based record label, released a CD single titled "Dance 4 Me" on December 12, 2011, as part of a club remixes package including the Bria Valente CD single "2 Nite" released on February 23, 2012. The CD features club remixes by Jamie Lewis and David Alexander, produced by Prince.

In January 2013, Prince released a lyric video for a new song called "Screwdriver". In April 2013, Prince announced a West Coast tour titled Live Out Loud Tour with 3rdeyegirl as his backing band. The final two dates of the first leg of the tour were in Minneapolis-St. Paul, where former Revolution drummer Bobby Z. sat in as guest drummer on both shows. In May, Prince announced a deal with Kobalt Music to market and distribute his music. On August 14, 2013, Prince released a new solo single for download through the 3rdeyegirl.com website. The single "Breakfast Can Wait" had cover art featuring comedian Dave Chappelle's impersonation of him, from a 2004 second-season Chappelle's Show comedy sketch on Comedy Central.

In February 2014, he performed concerts with 3rdeyegirl in London titled the Hit and Run Tour. Beginning with intimate shows, the first was held at the London home of singer Lianne La Havas, followed by two performances of what Prince described as a "sound check" at the Electric Ballroom in Camden, and another at Shepherd's Bush Empire. On April 18, 2014, Prince released a new single entitled "The Breakdown". He re-signed with his former label, Warner Bros. Records after an 18-year split. Warner announced that Prince would release a remastered deluxe edition of Purple Rain in 2014 to celebrate the 30th anniversary of the album. In return, Warner gave Prince ownership of the master recordings of his recordings with the company.

In February 2014, Prince began what was billed as his "Hit N Run Part One" tour. This involved Prince's Twitter followers keeping an avid eye on second-by-second information as to the whereabouts of his shows. Many of these shows would only be announced on the day of the concert, and many also involved two performances: a matinée and an evening show. These shows began at Camden's Electric Ballroom, billed as "Soundchecks", and spread throughout the UK capital to KoKo Club, in Camden, Shepherd's Bush Empire and various other small venues. After his London dates, he moved on to other European cities. In May 2014, Prince began his "Hit N Run Part Two" shows, which followed a more normal style of purchasing tickets online and being held in music arenas. In spring 2014, he launched NPG Publishing, a music company to administer his own music and that of other artists without the restrictions of mainstream record companies.

In May 2015, following the killing of Freddie Gray in police custody and the subsequent riots, Prince released the song "Baltimore" in tribute to Gray and in support of the protesters in that city. He also held a tribute concert for Gray at his Paisley Park estate called "Dance Rally 4 Peace" in which he encouraged fans to wear the color gray in honor of Freddie Gray. On May 10, he performed a special concert at the Royal Farms Arena in Baltimore called "Rally 4 Peace", which featured a special appearance by Baltimore State's Attorney Marilyn Mosby, and one set performed by Prince alone at a keyboard.

Prince's penultimate album, Hit n Run Phase One, was first made available on September 7, 2015, on the music streaming service Tidal before being released on CD and for download on September 14. His final album, Hit n Run Phase Two, was meant as a continuation of this, and was released on Tidal for streaming and download on December 12, 2015. In February 2016, Prince embarked on the Piano & A Microphone Tour, a tour that saw his show stripped back to only him and a custom piano on stage. He performed a series of warm-up shows at Paisley Park in late January 2016 and the tour commenced in Melbourne, Australia, on February 16, 2016, to critical acclaim. The Australian and New Zealand legs of the tour were played in small-capacity venues, including the Sydney Opera House. Hit n Run Phase Two CDs were distributed to every attendee after each performance. The tour continued to the United States but was abruptly cut short by illness in April 2016.

== Death ==
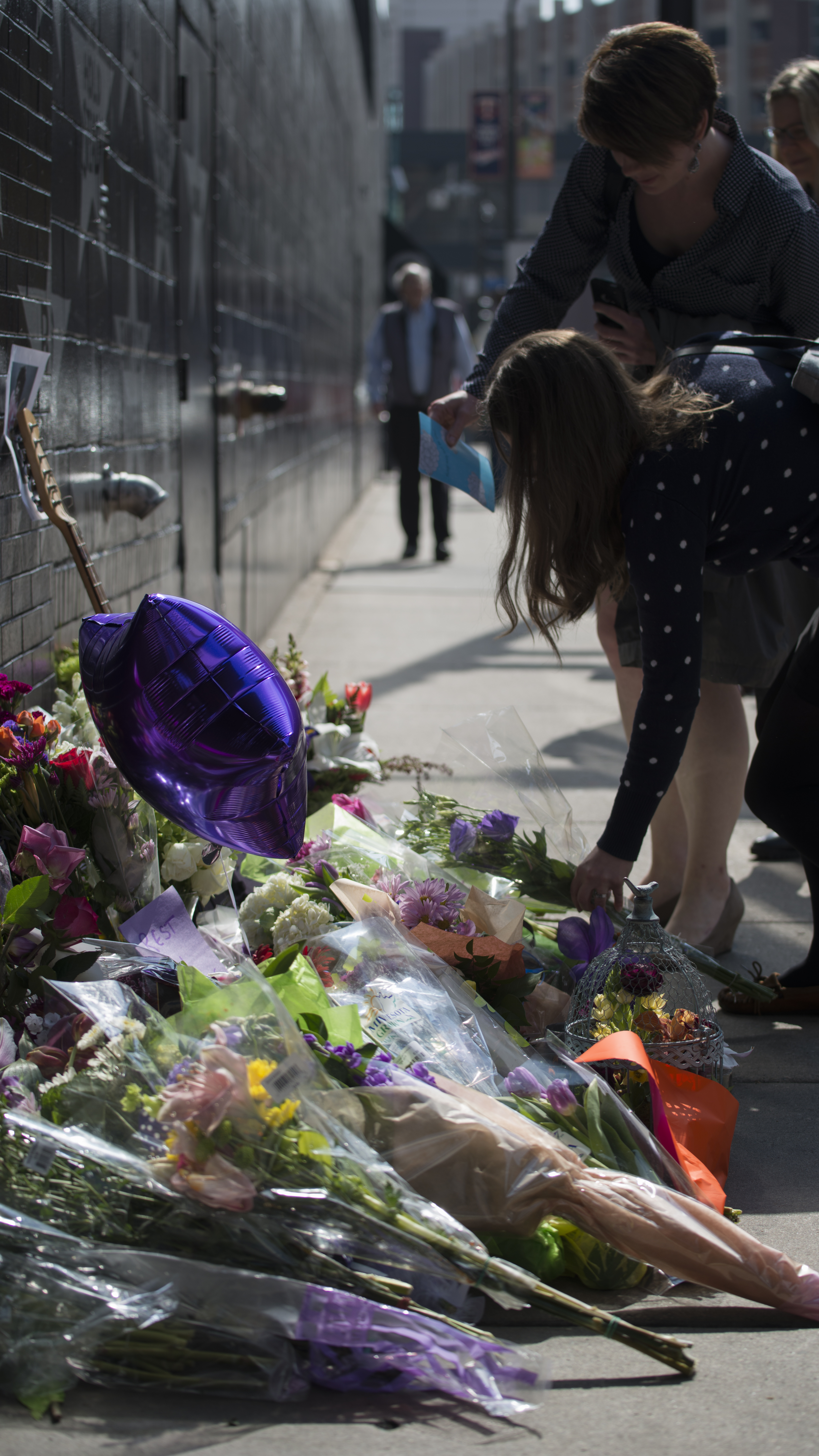
Following his death, fans left flowers, purple balloons and other mementos beneath Prince's star painted on the front of the First Avenue nightclub.

Prince saw Dr. Michael T. Schulenberg, a local specialist in family medicine, in Excelsior, Minnesota, on April 7, 2016, and again on April 20. On April 7, he postponed two performances at the Fox Theatre in Atlanta from his Piano & a Microphone Tour; the venue released a statement saying he had influenza. He rescheduled and performed what was to be his final show on April 14, despite still not feeling well. While flying back to the Twin Cities early the next morning, he became unresponsive, and his private jet made an emergency landing at Quad Cities International Airport in Moline, Illinois, where he was hospitalized and received naloxone, a medication used to block the effects of opioids, especially following an overdose. Once he became conscious, he left against medical advice. Representatives said he was dehydrated and had had influenza for several weeks. Prince was seen cycling the next day in Chanhassen. He shopped that evening at the Electric Fetus in Minneapolis for Record Store Day and made a brief appearance at an impromptu dance party at his Paisley Park recording studio complex, stating that he was feeling fine. On April 19, he attended a performance by singer Lizz Wright at the Dakota Jazz Club.

On April 20, 2016, Prince's representatives called Howard Kornfeld, a California specialist in addiction medicine and pain management, seeking medical help for the musician. Kornfeld scheduled to meet with him on April 22, and he contacted a local physician who cleared his schedule for an exam on April 21. On April 21, at 9:43 am, the Carver County Sheriff's Office received a 911 call requesting an ambulance be sent to Prince's home at Paisley Park. The caller initially told the dispatcher that an unidentified person at the home was unconscious, then moments later said he was dead, and finally identified the person as Prince. The caller was Kornfeld's son, who had flown in with buprenorphine that morning to devise a treatment plan for opioid addiction. Emergency responders found Prince unresponsive in an elevator and performed CPR, but a paramedic said he had already been dead for at least six hours, and they were unable to revive him. They pronounced him dead at 10:07 am, 19 minutes after their arrival. There were no signs of suicide or foul play. A press release from the Midwest Medical Examiner's Office in Anoka County on June 2 stated that Prince had died of an accidental overdose of fentanyl at the age of 57.

The counterfeit hydrocodone/acetaminophen pills that led to his overdose contained fentanyl. How and where Prince obtained the counterfeit pills was the subject of investigations by several law enforcement agencies. A sealed search warrant was issued for his estate, and another unsealed search warrant was issued for the local Walgreens pharmacy. On April 19, 2018, the Carver County Attorney announced that the multi-agency investigation had ended with no criminal charges filed. The investigation also revealed that Prince was addicted to opioids.

Following an autopsy, Prince's remains were cremated. On April 26, 2016, Prince's sister Tyka Nelson filed court documents in Carver County to open a probate case, stating that no will had been found. As of his death, the twice-divorced Prince was neither married nor known to have fathered any surviving children. Under Minnesota law, the absence of a will meant that, in addition to his full sister, Prince's five half-siblings also had a claim to an estate totaling millions of dollars in cash as well as real estate, stocks, and cars. Within three weeks of his death, 700 people claimed to be half-siblings or descendants. Otto Bremer Trust was given temporary control of his estate, had his vault drilled open, and was authorized to obtain a blood sample for DNA profiling from the coroner who had performed the autopsy.

Prince's ashes were placed into a custom 3D-printed urn shaped like the Paisley Park estate. The urn, which was co-designed by his sister Tyka and her son President, was placed on display in the atrium of Paisley Park in October 2016. As of April 2019, no additional estate claimants were recognized by the courts besides Prince's full sister and five half-siblings. Filings in the Minnesota First Judicial District ordered that the cash in Prince's estate be split evenly between Prince Legacy LLC and Prince OAT Holdings LLC.

=== Reactions and tributes ===
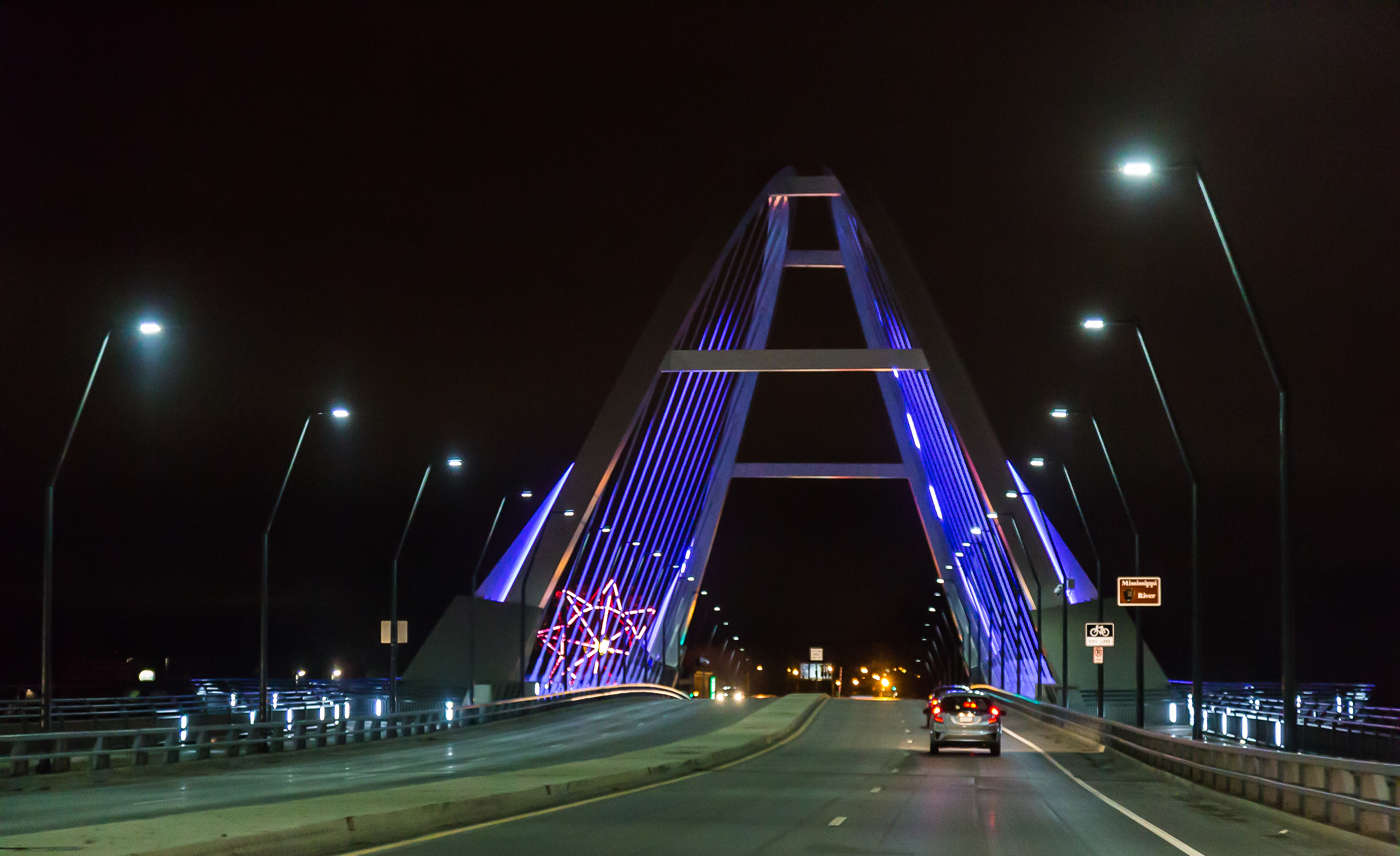
Lowry Bridge in Minneapolis illuminated in purple, in remembrance of Prince

Numerous musicians and cultural figures reacted to Prince's death. President Obama mourned him, and the United States Senate passed a resolution praising his achievements "as a musician, composer, innovator, and cultural icon". Cities across the U.S. held tributes and vigils, and lit buildings, bridges, and other structures in purple. In the first five hours after the media reported his death, "Prince" was the top trending term on Twitter, and Facebook had 61 million Prince-related interactions. AMC Theatres and Carmike Cinemas screened Purple Rain in select theaters over the following week. Saturday Night Live aired an episode in his honor, titled "Goodnight, Sweet Prince", featuring his performances from the show.

Nielsen Music reported that sales of his material spiked 42,000 percent. 4.41 million albums and songs were sold from April 21 to 28, with five albums simultaneously in the top ten of the Billboard 200, a first in the chart's history. At the 59th Grammy Awards, Morris Day with the Time and Bruno Mars performed a tribute.

Seven days after Prince's death on April 28, 2016, The Purple Rain Tartan was created by David McGill for fans to wear for Highland dress to commemorate his career and legacy. In August 2017, Pantone introduced a new shade of purple ( ) in their color system in honor of Prince, called Love Symbol #2.

The May 2, 2016, cover of The New Yorker featured an illustration of purple rain, as a reference to his 1984 album. In June 2016, Vanity Fair released a special edition commemorative magazine, The Genius of Prince. It celebrated his life and achievements, with new photography and archive articles, including the original Vanity Fair article from November 1984, written in the wake of the singer-songwriter's breakout success, with other content from the magazine, The New Yorker, Wired, and Pitchfork. The cover of The Genius of Prince featured a portrait by Andy Warhol, Orange Prince (1984). Casts of the musicals The Color Purple and Hamilton paid tribute to the star during their curtain calls with "Purple Rain" and "Let's Go Crazy", respectively. On August 21, 2016, Prince was posthumously inducted into the Rhythm and Blues Music Hall of Fame.

=== Posthumous releases ===
The first posthumous release from Prince's estate was the greatest hits album 4Ever on November 22, 2016. It is a compilation of Prince's hits, such as "Purple Rain" and "Raspberry Beret". The album included one previously unreleased song, named "Moonbeam Levels", originally recorded in the 1999 album sessions in 1982.

On February 9, 2017, Prince's estate signed a distribution deal with Universal Music Group, which included the post-1995 recordings on his NPG Records label and unreleased tracks from his vault. On June 27, Comerica, acting on behalf of the estate, requested that Carver County District Judge Kevin Eide cancel the estate's deal with Universal, as UMG's contract would interfere with a contract with Warner Music Group that Prince signed in 2014. After Universal's attorneys were granted access to the Warner contract, the attorneys also offered to cancel the deal. On July 13, the court voided Universal's deal with Prince's estate.

On April 19, 2017, an EP featuring six unreleased Prince recordings, Deliverance, was announced with an expected release date for later that week. The next day, Prince's estate was granted a temporary restraining order against George Ian Boxill, an engineer who co-produced the tracks and was in possession of the master tapes, and halted the release of the EP. On June 23, a deluxe reissue of Purple Rain was released. The most expansive edition contained a 2015 remaster of the original album, a bonus disc of previously unreleased material called "From the Vault & Previously Unreleased", B-sides, and the first DVD issue of Prince and the Revolution: Live, which was recorded in Syracuse on the Purple Rain Tour. The album debuted at number four on the Billboard 200 and at number one on both the Billboard R&B Albums and Vinyl Albums charts.

In April 2018, the previously unreleased original recording of "Nothing Compares 2 U" from 1984 was released as a single. A music video was also released consisting of edited rehearsal footage shot in the summer of 1984. Troy Carter, adviser for Prince's estate, later announced in an interview with Variety that a full-length album was planned for release on September 28. In June of that year, the Prince estate signed a distribution deal with Sony Music Entertainment including the rights to all of Prince's studio albums, plus unreleased music, remixes, live recordings, music videos and B-sides. Since 2021, albums produced by Prince between 1978 and 1996 are distributed by Sony/Legacy Recordings in the United States, with Warner Music Group, the original publisher, still holding the international distribution rights.

On August 17, 2018, all albums produced by Prince after 1996 were released digitally on streaming platforms, together with a new compilation album entitled Anthology: 1995–2010. Only one song remained unavailable to stream, "The Most Beautiful Girl in the World", due to a plagiarism lawsuit in Italy that was not resolved until 2022. On September 21, Piano and a Microphone 1983 was released, an intimate recording of Prince privately rehearsing with a piano.

The Sony/Legacy reissues began in 2019. Throughout that year, Musicology, 3121, Planet Earth, Rave Un2 the Joy Fantastic, Rave In2 the Joy Fantastic, Chaos and Disorder, and Emancipation were reissued on CD and vinyl. Ultimate Rave was also released, a 2 CD and 1 DVD set which included Rave Un2 the Year 2000, a concert film. The Versace Experience: Prelude 2 Gold was also reissued for Record Store Day. In June, a compilation of Prince's original recordings of songs given to other artists, entitled Originals, was released, initially exclusively through Tidal, then later on CD and vinyl. In October, a single of Prince's previously unheard original acoustic demo of "I Feel for You" was released digitally and as a limited 7" single.

In October 2019, Prince's incomplete memoir, titled The Beautiful Ones, was published by Random House. Prince had worked on the memoir with Dan Piepenbring during the Piano and a Microphone Tour in 2016 and had managed to complete around 50 pages before his death. The book includes those pages plus a lengthy account by Piepenbring of how the project came to be, a scrapbook of rare personal photos and miscellanea from the vault, and Prince's original handwritten concept for the film Purple Rain. In November, a deluxe reissue of 1999 was released. This reissue had several configurations, the most expansive including 35 previously unreleased songs and two live concerts.

In 2020, a Super Deluxe reissue of Sign o' the Times was released. This reissue had various configurations, with the most expansive containing the original album, the single and maxi-single mixes, related B-sides, 45 previously unissued studio tracks, a live show from the Sign o' the Times Tour in Utrecht, the Netherlands, and a DVD featuring the New Year's Eve 1987 show at Paisley Park. Pitchfork rated the Super Deluxe version 10 out of 10 and named it Best New Reissue. In June 2021, The Truth was reissued on vinyl for Record Store Day. The following month saw the release of Welcome 2 America, a previously-unreleased album originally recorded and shelved in 2010. In 2022, Prince and the Revolution: Live was reissued on Blu-Ray, along with the soundtrack which was also released on CD and vinyl for the first time. "The Most Beautiful Girl in the World" would appear on music streaming services in that same year; it had previously been unavailable due to a plagiarism lawsuit in Italy, with songwriters Bruno Bergonzi and Michele Vicino now being legally recognized as co-writers in the country.

In 2023, a Super Deluxe reissue of Diamonds and Pearls was released, containing the original album, remixes and B-sides, 33 previously unheard tracks and a Blu-ray of a live concert recorded at Glam Slam in Minneapolis as a rehearsal for the 1992 Diamonds and Pearls Tour. In 2024, a nine-hour documentary titled The Book of Prince was in production by Ezra Edelman for release on Netflix. The estate was reportedly unhappy with the project, considering it a "sensationalized" depiction of his life. A few people saw a rough cut of the film; one of them, Sasha Weiss, wrote in The New York Times Magazine that it contained at least one instance of a former girlfriend accusing him of abuse. She said "We're asked to sit with Prince's multiplying paradoxes for many hours, allowing them to unsettle one another". In February 2025, the project was officially cancelled and it was announced that "a new documentary featuring exclusive content from Prince's archive" would be produced by the estate instead; this has been described as "a watered-down take, to placate the powers that be". The Prince estate's social media accounts then posted a video of a vault door being opened with the caption "The vault is free."

In 2026, Prince's estate announced Timeless, a compilation album with nine studio recordings spanning from 1977 to 2016 in chronological order, and a live recording of "How Come U Don't Call Me Anymore?". The album was previewed with the single "With This Tear" (Note: The song was originally featured on the album Celine Dion. The version included on Timeless is the original version sung by Prince.) on April 20, 2026, and the album was released on August 28, 2026.

== Personal life ==
=== Family ===
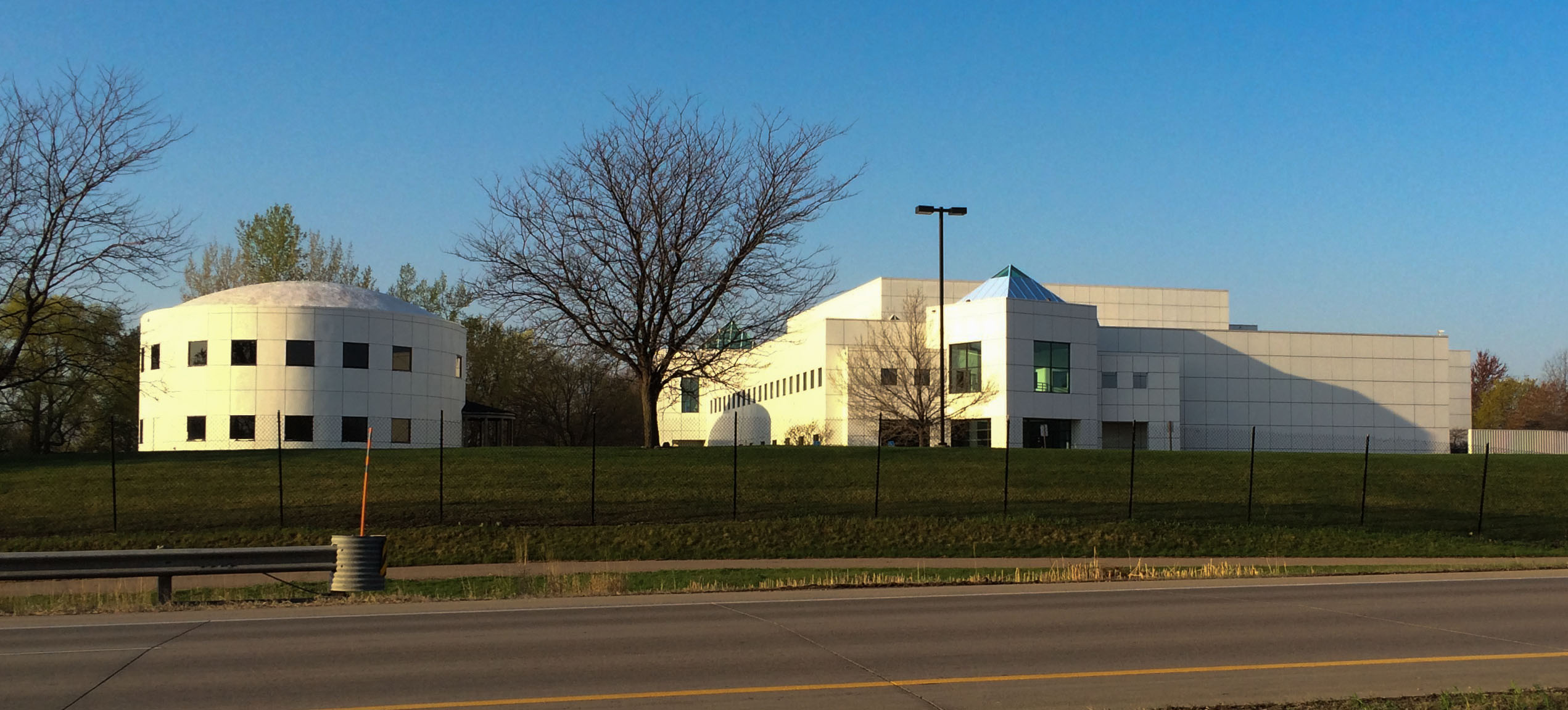
Paisley Park, Prince's home and recording studio in Chanhassen, Minnesota

Prince had seven siblings, six of whom were half-siblings. As Prince had no will, the six siblings who survived him at the time of his death could inherit his estate. As of November 2024, only three of them, half-sisters Sharon and Norraine Nelson, and half brother Omarr Baker, are still alive. However, only the two surviving half-sisters still have shares in Prince's estate.

Prince's half sister Lorna died in 2006. Another half-brother, Alfred Jackson, died in August 2019. On September 3, 2021, John R. Nelson, Prince's eldest half brother, died. On November 4, 2024, musician Tyka Nelson, who was Prince's only full sibling, died. In July 2021, Omarr Baker and late half brother Alfred Jackson's interest sold all of the shares they owned of Prince's estate to Primary Wave Music, while Tyka Nelson sold 90%.

=== Relationships ===
Prince was romantically linked with many women over the years, including Kim Basinger, Madonna, Vanity, Jill Jones, Sheila E., Carmen Electra, Susannah Melvoin, Ophélie Winter and Sherilyn Fenn. Susannah Melvoin recalled how, around the time of Sign o' the Times, "Wendy [Melvoin, her twin sister] & Lisa [Coleman] and I lived together and we would have [Prince] stay at our place. We became really close. He got to be in a family of three women, and we got to have our Prince. Not many people had that kind of relationship with him."

In 1990, Prince saw 16-year-old dancer Mayte García standing outside his tour bus and referred to her as his "future wife" when pointing her out to bandmate Rosie Gaines. García began working as one of his backup singers and dancers after graduating from high school. They were married on February 14, 1996, when he was 37 and she was 22. According to García, she and Prince had a son named Amiir, who was born on October 16, 1996. Amiir died a week after being born due to Pfeiffer syndrome. Attempts by publications to independently verify the child's name, birth, and cause of death proved difficult due to Prince's focus on privacy. The distress of losing a child and García's subsequent miscarriage took a toll on the marriage, and the couple divorced in 2000. Prince married Manuela Testolini, a Canadian businesswoman of Italian and Egyptian descent, in a private ceremony in 2001. They separated in 2005 and filed for divorce in May 2006, which was finalized in October 2007.

=== Religious beliefs ===
Prince was an observant religious person from childhood and throughout his life. An abiding love of God and Jesus were recurring themes in his work, often closely intertwined with romance, sexuality and sensuality on songs such as "I Would Die 4 U" and albums such as Lovesexy. In March 2016, while discussing his childhood during a show in Oakland, he told the audience, "I wanted to be like my father and I loved everything he loved—my mother, the Bible, and music.

A complete recitation of the Lord's Prayer is featured in the full-length album version of his 1981 hit "Controversy". His 1984 track "Darling Nikki", while dealing with explicit subject matter involving an encounter with a sex worker, contained the following backward message: "Hello, how are you? I'm fine, 'cause I know that the Lord is coming soon. Coming, coming soon."

Prince became a Jehovah's Witness in 2001 as a result of his friendship with bassist Larry Graham, who was also a Witness. He did not consider it a conversion but a "realization", comparing his connection with Graham to Morpheus and Neo in The Matrix. He attended meetings at a local Kingdom Hall and occasionally knocked on people's doors to discuss his faith. His newfound faith would also heavily influence his album The Rainbow Children (2001).

Shortly after he became a Witness, former bandmates Wendy Melvoin and Lisa Coleman reached out to him for a potential reunion of The Revolution. Melvoin claims he declined due to her lesbian and Jewish identities, then asked her to hold a press conference in which she would disavow homosexuality and become a Jehovah's Witness herself. She resigned herself to never hearing from him again. However, Prince later reunited with Melvoin in 2004 to perform a stripped-back acoustic version of the song "Reflection" on PBS's Tavis Smiley late-night talk show, and subsequently performed "Purple Rain" with her and Coleman at the Brit Awards 2006. Anti-gay marriage comments were attributed to him in 2008, but were later denied by his management and walked back by him personally, later stating: "I have friends who are gay, and we study the Bible together." Despite his ambiguous, contradictory and evolving personal convictions throughout his lifetime, Prince is often considered a gay icon by his fans for his influence on music, fashion and culture in a manner infused with religious themes.

García said of Prince's religious beliefs: "He was always a spiritual seeker ... fascinated in all possibilities to integrate the signs of the zodiac and third eye and reincarnation into the Christian beliefs his Baptist mother and Seventh-day Adventist father had exposed him to." At the time of his death, Prince's display picture on Twitter was an illustration of him with both eyes closed and a third eye open on his forehead.

=== Political beliefs and activism ===
Prince rarely expressed partisan political beliefs directly for the majority of his career. However, he did not shy away from political themes and commentary in early songs such as "Partyup", "Ronnie, Talk to Russia"—which directly addressed then-president Ronald Reagan—"America", and "Sign o' the Times". "Money Don't Matter 2 Night" was partly a protest against the Gulf War. His 2002 song "Avalanche" contained the lyric "Abraham Lincoln was a racist" and discussed the Thirteenth Amendment. In 2004, the music video for his single "Cinnamon Girl" depicted a young Muslim woman facing Islamophobia and racial abuse and then detonating a suicide bomb in a crowded airport, before revealing it had all been a dream.

In a 2009 interview with Tavis Smiley, when asked for his opinion on the recent election of Barack Obama, Prince replied that he did not vote for him and had never voted. He also expressed a belief in the chemtrail conspiracy theory during the same interview.

Towards the end of his life, Prince was a supporter of Black Lives Matter. According to Al Sharpton, he donated to the family of Trayvon Martin in 2012 and later arranged for Eric Garner's family to attend one of his concerts. Before handing out the Grammy for Best Album in 2015, he told the audience, "Albums—remember those? Albums still matter. Albums, like books and black lives, still matter." He organized a "Rally 4 Peace" concert in the city of Baltimore in the aftermath of the killing of Freddie Gray. The following day, he released a single titled "Baltimore" with lyrics that mentioned Gray and Michael Brown. The music video for "Baltimore" featured footage of Black Lives Matter protests in the city, and closed with a message from Prince: "The system is broken. It's going to take the young people to fix it this time. We need new ideas, new life".

Prince was an animal rights activist who followed a vegan diet for part of his life but later described himself as vegetarian. He previously adhered to a pescetarian diet in the 2000s, and, according to an interview with the Vegetarian Times, he first expressed curiosity in removing meat from his diet around 1987 when he ceased eating all red meat. Prince required Paisley Park guests and staff to maintain a vegetarian diet or pescetarian diet while present to keep the environment meatless. In honor of Prince's personal ethos, Paisley Park continues to require that individuals leave the premises if they would like to eat meat. The liner notes for his album Rave Un2 the Joy Fantastic featured a message about the cruelty involved in wool production.

=== Philanthropy ===
Prince did not speak publicly about his charitable endeavors. The extent of his activism, philanthropy, and charity was only publicized after his death, and much of it remains undocumented. In 2001, he anonymously donated $12,000 to the Louisville Free Public Library system to keep the historic Western Branch Library—the country's first full-service library for African-Americans—from closure. That same year, he anonymously paid off the medical bills of drummer Clyde Stubblefield, who was undergoing cancer treatment. In 2015, he conceived and launched YesWeCode, paying for many hackathons outright and performing musical acts at some of them. He also helped fund the Green for All initiative. According to Australian musician Ed Le Brocq's autobiography Danger Music, written about Le Brocq's time as a music teacher in Afghanistan, Prince had "quietly donated to PARSA (Physiotherapy and Rehabilitation Services for Afghanistan) for years", which had funded the revival of the Afghanistan Scout Association.

== Artistry ==
=== Image ===
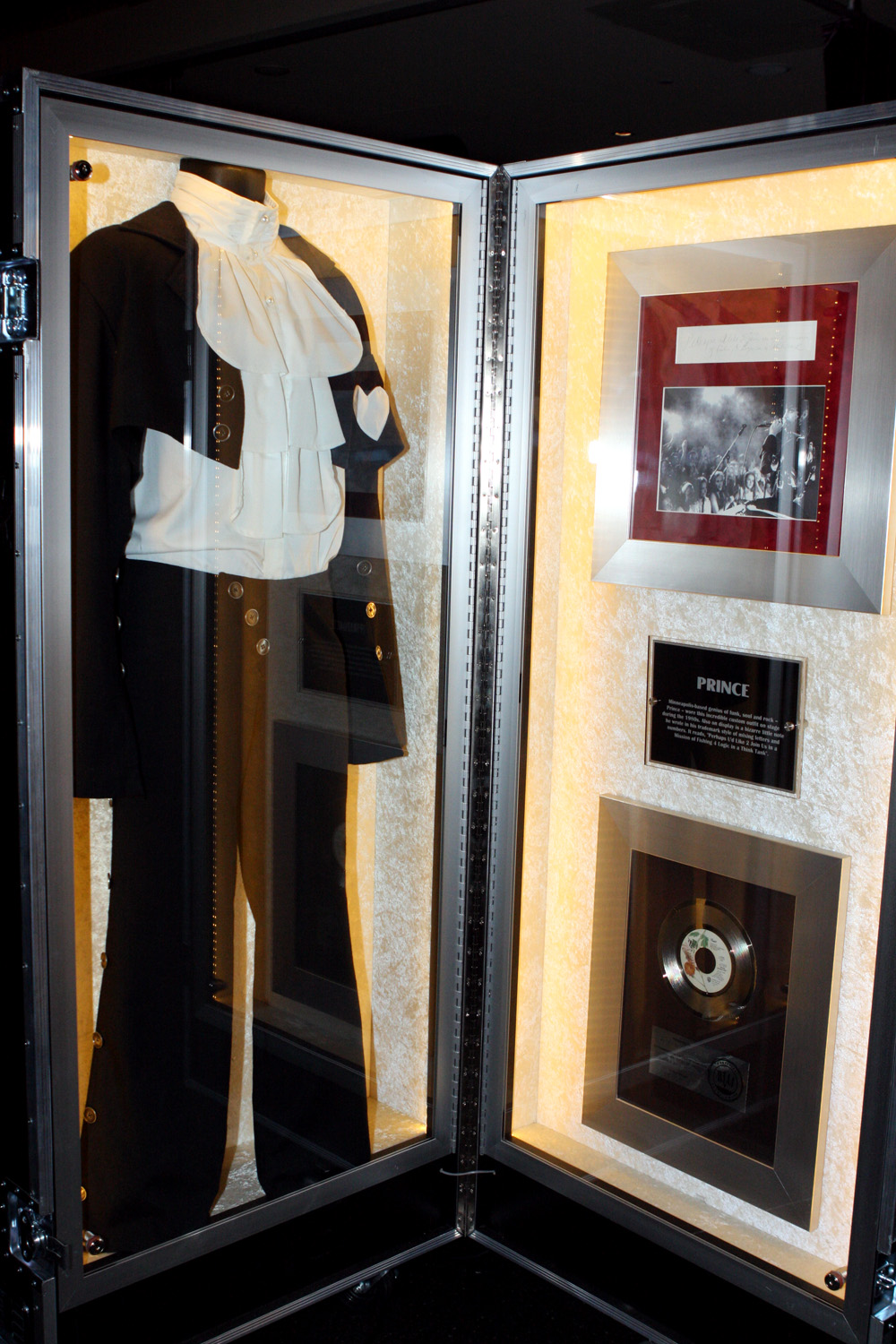
A costume worn by Prince and associated memorabilia, displayed at a Hard Rock Cafe in Australia

As a performer, Prince was known for his flamboyant style and showmanship. He came to be regarded as a sex symbol for his androgynous, amorphous persona, play with signifiers of gender, and defiance of racial stereotypes. His "audacious, idiosyncratic" fashion sense made use of "ubiquitous purple, alluring makeup and frilled garments". His androgynous look has been compared to those of Little Richard, Marc Bolan, and David Bowie. In 2016, Simon Reynolds described it as "Prince's '80s evasion of conventional gender definitions speaks to us now in this trans-aware moment. But it also harks backwards in time to the origins of rock 'n' roll in racial mixture and sexual blurring". Prince was known for the strong female presence in his bands and his support for women in the music industry throughout his career. Slate said he worked with an "astounding range of female stars" and "promised a world where men and women looked and acted like each other".

=== Influences ===
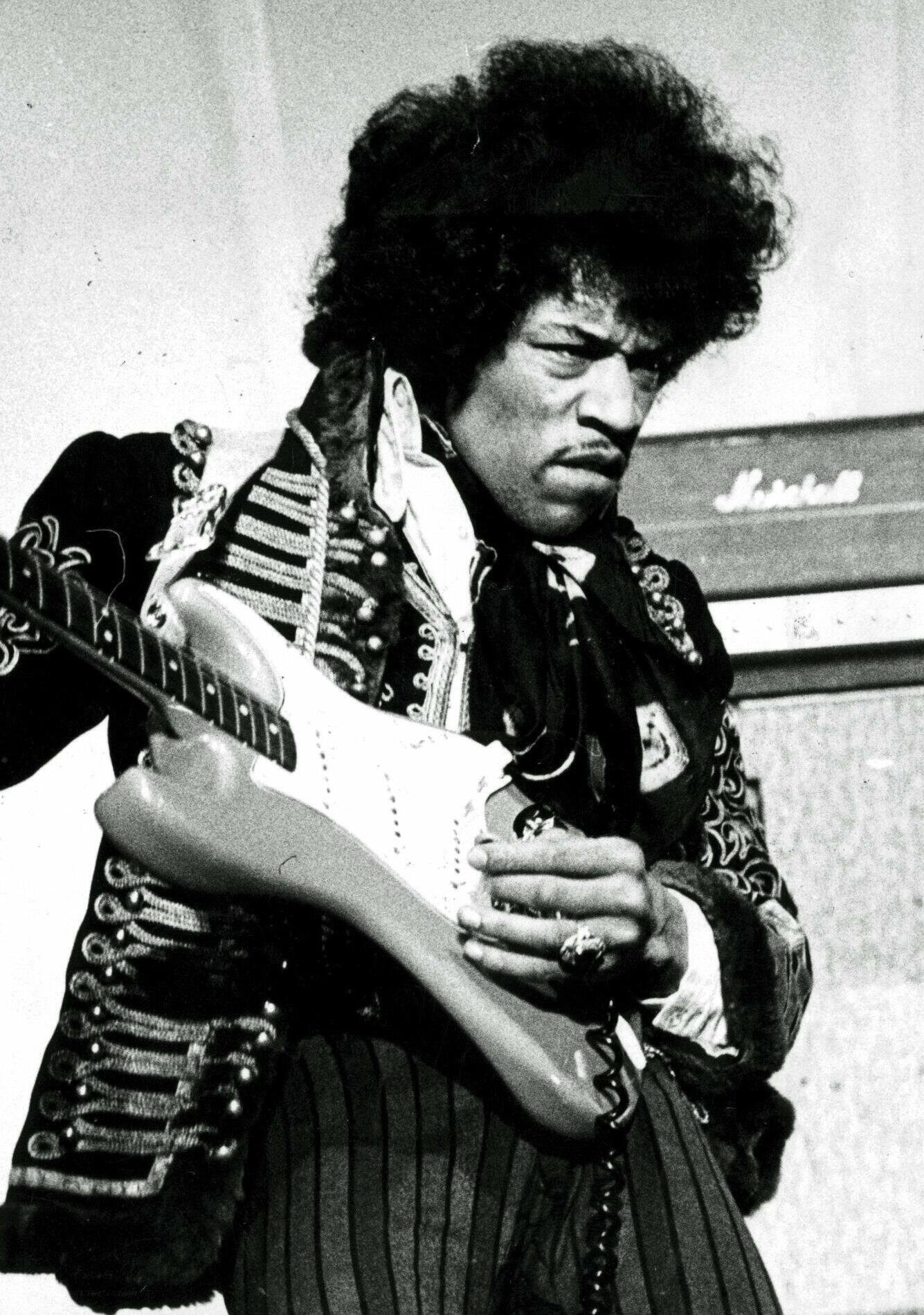
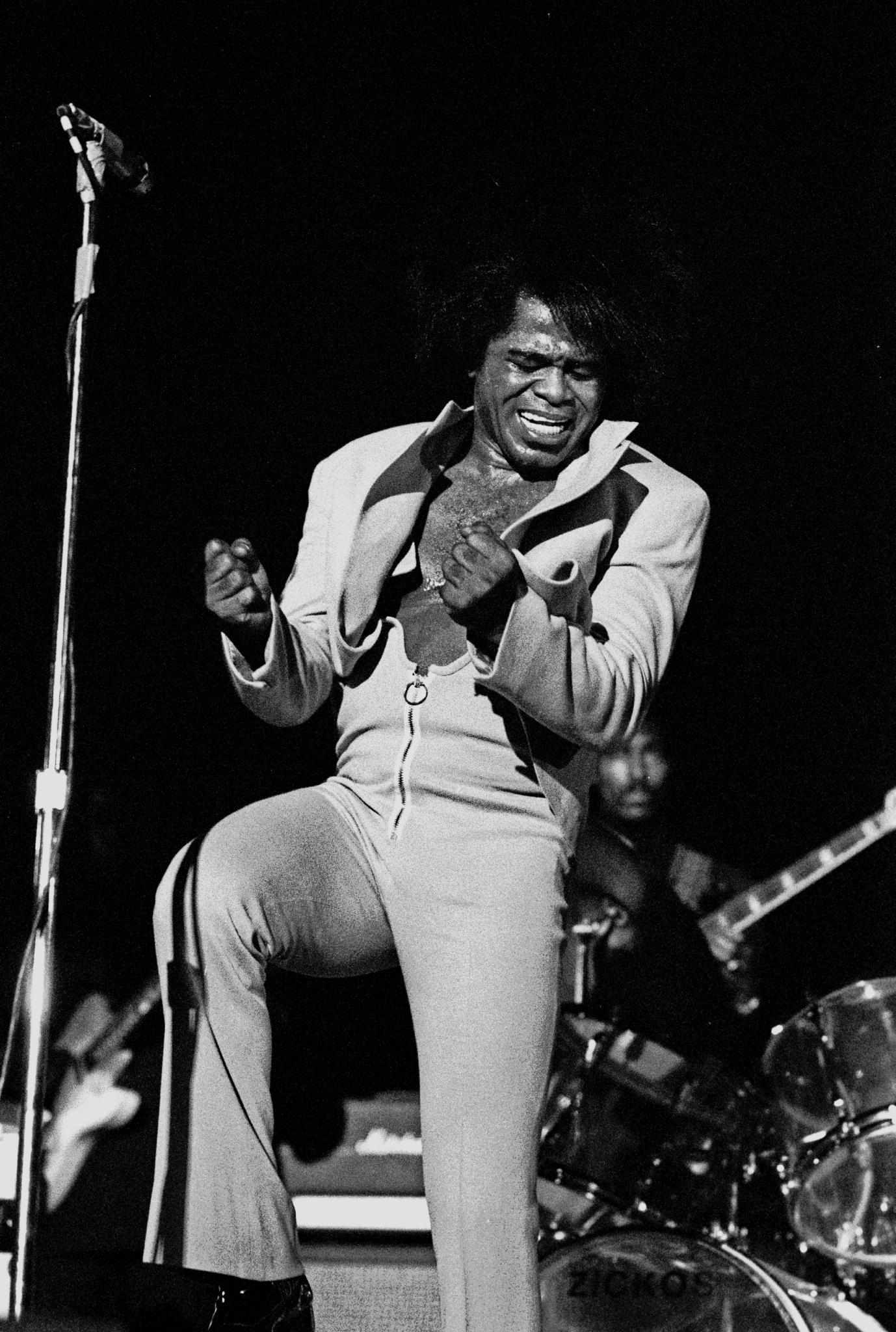
Jimi Hendrix (left) and James Brown (right) both influenced Prince and his music.

Prince's music synthesized a wide variety of influences, and drew inspiration from a range of musicians, including Ike Turner, James Brown, George Clinton, Joni Mitchell, Duke Ellington, Jimi Hendrix, the Beatles, Chuck Berry, David Bowie, Earth, Wind & Fire, Mick Jagger, Rick James, Jerry Lee Lewis, Little Richard, Curtis Mayfield, Elvis Presley, Todd Rundgren, Carlos Santana, Sly Stone, Jackie Wilson, and Stevie Wonder.

Prince has been compared with jazz artist Miles Davis in regard to the artistic changes throughout his career. Davis said he regarded Prince as an otherworldly blend of James Brown, Jimi Hendrix, Marvin Gaye, Sly Stone, Little Richard, Duke Ellington, and Charlie Chaplin. Prince and Miles Davis performed together in December 1987 for a Charity Event at Paisley Park. This performance was viewed as the pinnacle of their on-again, off-again partnership.

=== Musicianship ===
Prince had a wide vocal range from falsetto to baritone, and performed rapid, seemingly effortless shifts of register. Prince was also renowned as a multi-instrumentalist. He is considered a guitar virtuoso and a master of drums, percussion, bass, keyboards, and synthesizer; he played nearly all instruments on his first five albums, among them various types of bass, keyboards and synthesizers. Journalist Nik Cohn described him as "rock's greatest ever natural talent". Prince was also quick to embrace technology in his music, making pioneering use of drum machines like the Linn LM-1 on his early albums and employing a wide range of studio effects. The Los Angeles Times also noted his "harnessing [of] new-generation synthesizer sounds in service of the groove", laying the foundations for post-'70s funk music. Prince was also known for his prolific and virtuosic tendencies, which resulted in him recording large amounts of unreleased material.

Prince also wrote songs for other artists, and some songs of his were covered by musicians, such as the hit songs "Manic Monday", performed by the Bangles; "I Feel for You", originally on Prince's self-titled second album from 1979, covered by Chaka Khan; and "Nothing Compares 2 U", written for Prince's side project the Family, and covered by Sinéad O'Connor. Prince co-wrote "Love... Thy Will Be Done" with singer Martika, for her second album, Martika's Kitchen, and also gifted Celine Dion a song for her second album, Celine Dion, titled "With This Tear"; it was a song Prince had written specifically for her.

=== Equipment ===
Prince was known to have a stylish and flamboyant custom guitar collection, which consisted of 121 guitars. These included his Cloud Guitars, which were commissioned and released in colored versions of white, yellow and purple. The white version is prominently shown in the Purple Rain film and the "Raspberry Beret" video. Other notable guitars are the Love Symbol guitars, which were designed in the separate colors of gold and purple in the shape of the aforementioned symbol. The guitar that was used for the majority of Prince's music career was the H.S. Anderson Madcat guitar, a Telecaster copy created by Hohner. Several of these guitar were used throughout his career; one was donated for charity, and one or more were stolen. Another guitar primarily used in his later years was the Vox HDC-77, which was introduced to him by 3rdeyegirl member Ida Kristine Nielsen. Prince used both a Blackburst version and a White Ivory version. Two other noteworthy guitars are the G1 Purple Special, and the black-and-gold Gus G3 Prince bass, which would become the last two guitars to ever be made for him.

== Legacy ==
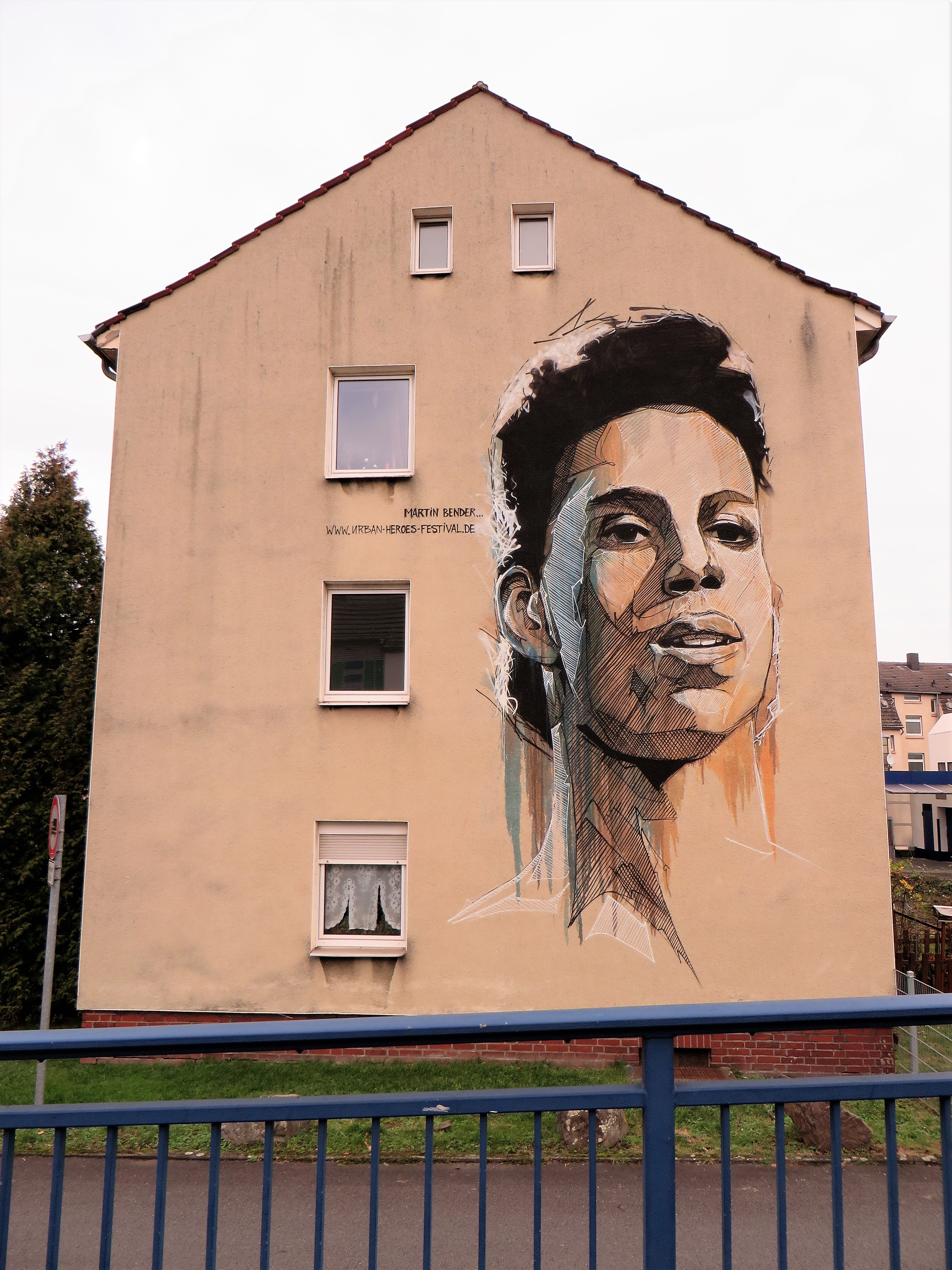
Prince street art in Hagen, Germany

Prince is often credited as a major influence on modern popular music, and was "the greatest musician of his generation", according to Billboard. Simon Reynolds called him a "pop polymath, flitting between funkadelia, acid rock, deep soul, schmaltz—often within the same song". The Los Angeles Times called Prince "our first post-everything pop star, defying easy categories of race, genre and commercial appeal". Jon Pareles of The New York Times described him as "a master architect of funk, rock, R&B and pop", and highlighted his ability to defy labels. Geoffrey Himes described him as a leading artist in "a tradition of left-wing black music", or "progressive soul", although even he conceded the term may be "too narrow". Los Angeles Times writer Randall Roberts called Prince "among the most versatile and restlessly experimental pop artists of our time," writing that his "early work connected disco and synthetic funk [while his] fruitful mid-period merged rock, soul, R&B and synth-pop." AllMusic wrote that "with each album he released, Prince showed remarkable stylistic growth and musical diversity, constantly experimenting with different sounds, textures, and genres [...] no other contemporary artist blended so many diverse styles into a cohesive whole." Pareles has named Prince among the "pantheon" of artists in the album era, in which the album format was the dominant form of recorded music expression and consumption.

Many artists have cited Prince as an influence and inspiration, including Beyoncé, Justin Timberlake, Bruno Mars, Rihanna, Alicia Keys, Usher, Janelle Monáe, the Weeknd, Lady Gaga, Lorde, Marilyn Manson, Lenny Kravitz, André 3000, Mark Speer, Snoop Dogg, Jamie Lidell, Dua Lipa, Doja Cat, Frank Ocean, Miguel, Mya, Robyn, Questlove, D'Angelo, H.E.R., Ciara, The-Dream, St. Vincent, Ween, and Beck. Bono of U2 regarded Prince as one of his "favorite composers of the twentieth century". Beyoncé expressed her admiration for Prince in the book Prince: A Private View, calling him her "mentor" and also praising his independence: "He dared to fight for what was rightfully his: his freedom, wrapped up in words and music he created."

== Awards and honors ==
Prince sold at least 100 million records worldwide, ranking him among the best-selling music artists of all time. He was inducted into the Rock and Roll Hall of Fame in 2004, the UK Music Hall of Fame in 2006, the National Rhythm & Blues Hall of Fame in 2016, and Songwriters Hall of Fame in 2024. In 2016, he was posthumously honored with a Doctor of Humane Letters by the University of Minnesota. He was inducted into the Black Music & Entertainment Walk of Fame in 2022. Prince was named the 14th greatest guitarist of all time by Rolling Stone in 2023.

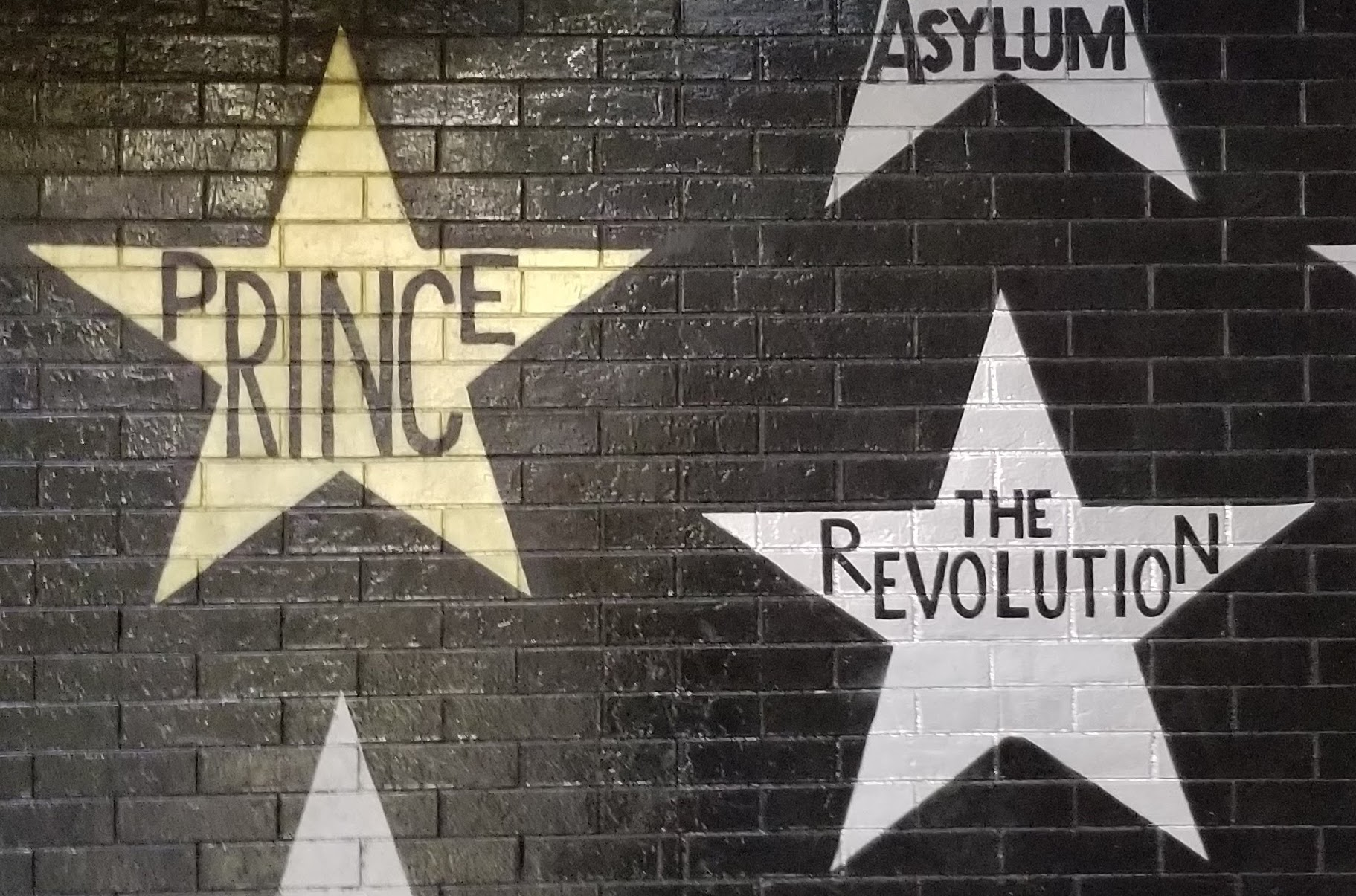
Stars honoring Prince and his band the Revolution on the outside mural of the Minneapolis nightclub First Avenue

Prince's awards include seven Grammy Awards, seven Brit Awards, four MTV Video Music Awards, an Academy Award for Best Original Song Score for the film Purple Rain, and a Golden Globe Award. Two of his albums, Purple Rain and Sign o' the Times, received the Grammy Award for Album of the Year nominations. 1999, Purple Rain and Sign o' the Times have all been inducted into the Grammy Hall of Fame. At the 28th Grammy Awards, Prince was awarded the President's Merit Award. At the 2013 Billboard Music Awards, he was honored with the Billboard Icon Award. In 2019, the 1984 film Purple Rain was added by the Library of Congress for preservation in the National Film Registry for being "culturally, historically, or aesthetically significant". In 2025, Prince received the Grammy Lifetime Achievement Award.

Rolling Stone ranked Prince at number 27 on its list of the 100 Greatest Artists, "the most influential artists of the rock & roll era". In 2023, it ranked him at number 16 on their list of the 200 Greatest Singers of All Time. In 2010, Prince was ranked at number seven on VH1's "100 Greatest Artists of All Time". In 2003, Rolling Stone's 500 Greatest Albums of All Time list included Purple Rain at number 72, Sign o' the Times at number 93, 1999 at number 163, and Dirty Mind at number 204. In 2004, on their 500 Greatest Songs of All Time list, Rolling Stone included "When Doves Cry" at number 52, "Little Red Corvette" at number 108, "Purple Rain" at number 143, "1999" at number 212, "Sign o' the Times" at number 299, and "Kiss" at number 461.

Prince is honored with a star on the outside mural of the Minneapolis nightclub First Avenue, recognizing performers that have played sold-out shows or have otherwise demonstrated a major contribution to the culture at the venue. According to journalist Steve Marsh, receiving a star "might be the most prestigious public honor an artist can receive in Minneapolis". The Revolution also has a star on the mural, to the immediate right of Prince's. Originally painted silver like the other stars on the mural, Prince's star was repainted in gold leaf during the night of May 4, 2016, about two weeks after Prince's death. Originally anonymous, the artist was revealed a few months later to be graphic designer and graffiti artist Peyton Russell, who had worked for Prince at his club Glam Slam in the 1990s and wanted to pay tribute.

== Discography ==
Studio albums

- For You (1978)
- Prince (1979)
- Dirty Mind (1980)
- Controversy (1981)
- 1999 (1982)
- Purple Rain (1984)
- Around the World in a Day (1985)
- Parade (1986)
- Sign o' the Times (1987)
- Lovesexy (1988)
- Batman (1989)
- Graffiti Bridge (1990)
- Diamonds and Pearls (1991)
- Love Symbol (1992)
- Come (1994)
- The Black Album (1994) (Note: The Black Album was meant to be released in 1987 but was canceled after Prince had a bad experience with ecstasy.)
- The Gold Experience (1995)
- Chaos and Disorder (1996)
- Emancipation (1996)
- Crystal Ball (1998)
- The Truth (1998)
- The Vault: Old Friends 4 Sale (1999)
- Rave Un2 the Joy Fantastic (1999)
- The Rainbow Children (2001)
- One Nite Alone... (2002)
- Xpectation (2003)
- N·E·W·S (2003)
- Musicology (2004)
- The Chocolate Invasion (2004)
- The Slaughterhouse (2004)
- 3121 (2006)
- Planet Earth (2007)
- Lotusflow3r (2009)
- MPLSound (2009)
- 20Ten (2010)
- Plectrumelectrum (2014)
- Art Official Age (2014)
- HITnRUN Phase One (2015)
- HITnRUN Phase Two (2015)

Posthumous albums

- Piano and a Microphone 1983 (2018)
- Originals (2019)
- Welcome 2 America (2021)
- Timeless (2026)

Albums released under various other names

- 8 (1987) (with Madhouse)
- 16 (1987) (with Madhouse)
- Gold Nigga (1993) (with the New Power Generation)
- Exodus (1995) (with the New Power Generation)
- Kamasutra (1997) (with the NPG Orchestra)
- Newpower Soul (1998) (with the New Power Generation)

== Filmography ==
Film
Year	Film	Role	Director
1984	Purple Rain	The Kid	Albert Magnoli
1986	Under the Cherry Moon	Christopher Tracy	Prince
1987	Sign o' the Times	Himself	Prince
1990	Graffiti Bridge	The Kid	Prince
1994	3 Chains o' Gold	Himself	Prince

Television
Year	Show	Role	Notes
1997	Muppets Tonight	Himself	Episode 11
2014	New Girl	Himself	Episode: "Prince"
2020	Let's Go Crazy: Grammy Salute to Prince	Himself (archive footage)	

== Tours ==
- Prince Tour (1979–1980)
- Dirty Mind Tour (1980–1981)
- Controversy Tour (1981–1982)
- 1999 Tour (1982–1983)
- Purple Rain Tour (1984–1985)
- Parade Tour (1986)
- Sign o' the Times Tour (1987)
- Lovesexy Tour (1988–1989)
- Nude Tour (1990)
- Diamonds and Pearls Tour (1992)
- Act I and II (1993)
- Interactive Tour (1994)
- The Ultimate Live Experience (1995)
- Gold Tour (1996)
- Love 4 One Another Charities Tour (1997)
- Jam of the Year World Tour (1997–1998)
- New Power Soul Tour/Festival (1998)
- Hit n Run Tour (2000–2001)
- A Celebration (2001)
- One Nite Alone... Tour (2002)
- 2003–2004 World Tour (2003–2004)
- Musicology Live 2004ever (2004)
- Per4ming Live 3121 (2006–2007)
- Earth Tour (2007)
- 20Ten Tour (2010)
- Welcome 2 (2010–2012)
- Live Out Loud Tour (2013)
- Hit and Run Tour (2014–2015)
- Piano & a Microphone Tour (2016)

== Books ==
- Prince; Gydesen, Terry (1994). Prince Presents: The Sacrifice of Victor. Paisley Park Enterprises. ISBN 9780967850115. OCLC 34307402.
- Prince; Piepenbring, Dan (2019). The Beautiful Ones. Spiegel & Grau. ISBN 9780399589652. OCLC 1117550641.

== See also ==
- List of artists who reached number one in the United States
- List of bestselling music artists
- List of dancers
- List of highest-certified music artists in the United States
- Unreleased Prince projects
