= Little Red Corvette =

- Benelux 7" cover

Single by Prince

from the album 1999
- B-side: "All the Critics Love U in New York"
- Released: February 9, 1983
- Recorded: May 20, 1982 (basic tracking); August 11–12, 1982 (mixing)
- Studio: Kiowa Trail home studio (Chanhassen, Minnesota) (basic tracking); Sunset Sound (Los Angeles, California) (mixing)
- Genre: Pop; post-disco; funk; rock; dance-rock
- Length: 5:02 (album version); 3:08 (single version); 8:27 (dance remix)
- Label: Warner Bros.
- Songwriter: Prince
- Producer: Prince

Prince singles chronology
| "1999" (1982) | "Little Red Corvette" (1983) | "Delirious" (1983) |

Music video
- "Little Red Corvette" on YouTube

"Little Red Corvette" is a song by American recording artist Prince. The song combines a Linn LM-1 beat and slow synth buildup with a rock chorus, over which Prince, using several automobile metaphors, recalls a one-night stand with a beautiful promiscuous woman. Backing vocals were performed by Lisa Coleman and Dez Dickerson; Dickerson also performs a guitar solo on the song.

Released in 1983 as the second single from 1999, the song was, at that point, Prince's highest charting and his first to reach the top 10 in the U.S., peaking at number 6 on the Billboard Hot 100. It was also his first single to perform better on the pop chart than the R&B chart. Later, it was rereleased as a double A-side with "1999", peaking at number two on the UK singles chart in January 1985. Following Prince's death in April 2016, "Little Red Corvette" re-charted on the Billboard Hot 100 at number 29, rising to number 20 the following week. It has sold more than 900,000 copies in the United States.

The initial US single was backed with album track "All the Critics Love U in New York", while UK releases featured "Lady Cab Driver" or "Horny Toad". An extended dance remix of "Little Red Corvette," featured on some 12" releases, was later featured on the 2006 compilation Ultimate.

== Origins ==
Prince got the idea for "Little Red Corvette" when he dozed off in band member Lisa Coleman's 1964 pink Mercury Montclair Marauder after an exhausting all-night recording session. The lyrics came to him in bits and pieces during this and other catnaps. Eventually, he was able to finish it without sleeping.

== Composition ==
"Little Red Corvette" is written in the key of D♭ major and moves at a tempo of 123 beats per minute in common time. Prince's vocals span from A♭_{2} to D♭_{7} in the song. The lyrics use car imagery as a double entendre for sex, also making use of horse-related imagery for similar purposes.

Jack Hamilton of Slate noted that the song is about "ambivalence, vulnerability, and fear" of casual sex. "It’s not about sex as fun...but rather about the entirety of the act: its physical, emotional, psychological, even spiritual dimensions. And uniquely, 'Little Red Corvette' isn't really about anything other than sex." With its instrumentation of guitars, synthesizers, and a drum machine, Hamilton identifies "Little Red Corvette" as a post-disco song "in every respect."

== Critical reception ==
Cash Box wrote that "a Vangelis-like synth bottom provides the smokey mood, while Prince's vocals traverse from the plaintive to the depraved." Billboard called it "a typically racy rock number, thick with electronics" and wrote that Prince's urgent vocal performance "makes even the more innocent lyrics sound illicit."

== Music video ==
"Little Red Corvette" (directed by Bryan Greenberg and released in February 1983) was Prince's second music video played on MTV. The first was "1999" the previous year before Michael Jackson's "Billie Jean" and after Musical Youth's "Pass the Dutchie". The video was filmed in late January 1983 at the Lakeland Civic Center during the final week of rehearsals for the second leg of the 1999 Tour.

According to Greenberg, there was also supposed to be some scenes shot the next day featuring Prince and Vanity driving around in a corvette. However Prince was said to be uncomfortable with the idea, given that his videos had only featured him on stage, and it was eventually scrapped.

== Awards and accolades ==
- Rolling Stone ranked the song No. 108 on its list of the 500 Greatest Songs of All Time (2004).
- Dickerson's guitar solo was ranked No. 64 all time by readers of Guitar World.

== Personnel ==
Credits sourced from Guitarcloud and Benoît Clerc

- Prince – lead and backing vocals; electric guitar; bass guitar; Oberheim OB-Xa; Linn LM-1; Pearl SY-1 Syncussion
- Dez Dickerson – electric guitar solo; backing vocals
- Lisa Coleman – backing vocals

== Charts ==
=== Weekly charts ===
1983 weekly chart performance for "Little Red Corvette"
| Chart (1983) | Peak position |
|---|---|
| Australia (Kent Music Report) | 8 |
| Canadian Singles Chart | 11 |
| New Zealand (Recorded Music NZ) | 12 |
| UK Singles (Official Charts) | 54 |
| US Billboard Hot 100 | 6 |
| US Billboard Hot R&B Singles | 28 |
| US Billboard Mainstream Rock Tracks | 17 |

1985 weekly chart performance for "1999/Little Red Corvette"
| Chart (1985) | Peak position |
|---|---|
| UK Singles (Official Charts) | 2 |

2016 weekly chart performance for "Little Red Corvette"
| Chart (2016) | Peak position |
|---|---|
| US Billboard Hot R&B/Hip-Hop Songs | 11 |
| US Billboard Hot Rock Songs | 4 |

=== Year-end charts ===
1983 year-end chart performance for "Little Red Corvette"
| Chart (1983) | Position |
|---|---|
| Australia (Kent Music Report) | 78 |
| Canada Top Singles (RPM) | 75 |
| US Top Pop Singles (Billboard) | 25 |

2016 year-end chart performance for "Little Red Corvette"
| Chart (2016) | Position |
|---|---|
| US Hot Rock Songs (Billboard) | 32 |

== Certifications ==
Certifications for "Little Red Corvette"
| Region | Certification | Certified units/sales |
|---|---|---|
| New Zealand (RMNZ) | Gold | 15,000^{‡} |
| United Kingdom (BPI) | Silver | 200,000^{‡} |
^{‡} Sales+streaming figures based on certification alone.
