= Camille (album) =

Studio album by Prince/Camille

- Rare LP copy of Camille pressed prior to its 1986 cancellation, without cover artwork

Studio album by Camille
- Released: TBA; January 1987 (withdrawn)
- Recorded: Late 1986
- Genre: Funk
- Labels: Paisley Park/Warner Bros. (canceled); Third Man (TBD)
- Producer: Prince

Camille is an unreleased studio album by American musician Prince. The album was originally recorded in 1986 under the pseudonym Camille, a feminine alter ego portrayed by Prince via pitch-shifting his vocals up to an androgynous register. Prince planned to release the album without any acknowledgement of his identity. The project was initially scrapped several weeks before its planned release, with rare early LP pressings eventually surfacing for auction in 2016; several tracks recorded for Camille were instead included on various other projects, most prominently Prince's 1987 double LP Sign o' the Times.

In March 2022, Third Man Records announced that it was granted the rights to release the album, with Ben Blackwell (co-founder of the label) saying "Prince’s people agreed – almost too easy." While the label indicated plans to release Camille, no release date or method of release has been announced yet. There have been no updates on the release since July 2022.

== Recording and concept ==
After abandoning his Dream Factory LP and breaking up his backing band The Revolution in mid-1986, Prince entered the studio with engineer Susan Rogers in late October to begin a new project. He began experimenting with his vocals in an artificially pitched-up style, achieved either by using a pitchshifter or by recording his vocals at a slower tempo and then speeding up the tape to create a higher, androgynous tone (he had previously experimented with this technique on his 1984 B-side "Erotic City").

Prince began referring to this new pitched-up voice as a feminine alter ego named Camille. The sessions commenced with the recording of the dance track "Housequake" and within ten days he had completed enough material for an album, which he planned to release pseudonymously under Camille's name as a self-titled debut. He informed Warner Bros. that his image would not appear on the cover and that he would not acknowledge the album as his own work. At some point, his plans for Camille also extended to ideas for a movie. It has been suggested that the name was inspired by the 19th century French intersex person Herculine Barbin, who also used the alias Camille and was the subject of the 1985 film Mystère Alexina.

By November 5, the album had reached the mastering stage and a number of copies were pressed, but Prince abandoned it weeks before its intended release. His reasons for doing so are not entirely clear, though it may have been in part due to Warner Bros.' unwillingness to release an album that would not be attributed to Prince's name. It is unknown how many original printed copies of the album exist, or whether prepared cover artwork was ever finalized, although the catalog number 25543 was assigned to the release. After shelving Camille, Prince combined the tracks intended for that album (except "Feel U Up") with other unreleased recordings from the period into the proposed triple album Crystal Ball. Against his wishes, Warner Bros. forced him to trim the tracklist down to a double album, which became Sign o' the Times (1987). This release included three Camille tracks: "Housequake", "If I Was Your Girlfriend", and "Strange Relationship".

== Aftermath ==
The remaining tracks from Camille would be released through other avenues in subsequent years. "Rebirth of the Flesh" was first released in its original form in 2020 on Sign o' the Times – Super Deluxe Edition. The NPG Music Club made a 1988 Lovesexy Tour rehearsal recording available in September 2001. "Feel U Up'" was released in 1989 as the B-side of "Partyman". "Shockadelica," originally written (unsolicited) by Prince as the title track for Jesse Johnson's then-forthcoming album titled Shockadelica (1986), was later included as a B-side of "If I Was Your Girlfriend". "Good Love" was later released on the Bright Lights, Big City film soundtrack in 1988.

Two other songs were credited to Camille after the album project was abandoned. The first was "Scarlet Pussy", which was released as the B-side of the 1988 single "I Wish U Heaven" featuring a black label. The second was "U Got the Look", which appeared on Sign o' the Times and was also released as a single. Another song was recorded using Camille vocals called "Cosmic Day", it was released alongside "Rebirth of the Flesh" on the super deluxe edition of Sign o' the Times.

Prince later invoked Camille as the guiding force responsible for his next project, The Black Album (which contained "Rockhard in a Funky Place", again as the final track). Like Camille, this album was also shelved shortly before its intended release after Prince experienced a spiritual epiphany and became convinced it was "evil"; he later blamed the album on an entity named Spooky Electric, described as a demonic alter-ego to Camille.

In 2016, a rare LP pressing of Camille made before its official shelving was put up for auction. The album sold for $58,787.

A super deluxe edition of Sign o' the Times was released on September 25, 2020, which includes outtakes from the Dream Factory/Camille/Crystal Ball sessions as bonus tracks.

== Track listing ==
All tracks are written by Prince, except "Rockhard in a Funky Place" by Prince and Eric Leeds.

Side 1
No.	Title	Other releases	Length
1.	"Rebirth of the Flesh"	Sign o' the Times – Super Deluxe Edition	4:54
2.	"Housequake"	Sign o' the Times	4:34
3.	"Strange Relationship"	Sign o' the Times	4:04
4.	"Feel U Up"	B-side of "Partyman"; The Hits/The B-Sides	6:27

Side 2
No.	Title	Other releases	Length
5.	"Shockadelica"	B-side of "If I Was Your Girlfriend"; The Hits/The B-Sides; Sign o' the Times – Super Deluxe Edition	6:12
6.	"Good Love"	Bright Lights, Big City soundtrack Crystal Ball (edited version)	5:11
7.	"If I Was Your Girlfriend"	Sign o' the Times	4:47
8.	"Rockhard in a Funky Place"	The Black Album	4:30

== Personnel ==
Credits from Duane Tudahl, Benoît Clerc and Guitarcloud

- Prince – lead and backing vocals, electric guitars (1–3, 5, 6, 8), Fairlight CMI (all tracks), Prophet VS (1, 2, 4, 6–8), Oberheim OB-8 (2, 4), Yamaha DX7 (3), Ensoniq Mirage (5), bass guitar (all but 1), Linn LM-1 (1, 2, 4–7), LinnDrum (3), drums (8), percussion (8), handclaps (2, 8), Publison IM90 Infernal Machine (all tracks)
- Eric Leeds – saxophone (1, 2, 4, 8), flute (8)
- Atlanta Bliss – trumpet (1, 2, 4, 8)
- Wendy Melvoin – tambourine (3), Fairlight CMI (3), electric guitar (3)
- Lisa Coleman – Fairlight CMI (3)
- Sheila E. – congas (3)
- Gilbert Davison, Coke Johnson, Todd Herreman, Susan Rogers, Mike Slotts, Brad Marsh – party voices (2)
- Susannah Melvoin – backing vocals (2, 6, 8), handclaps (8)
- Jill Jones – backing vocals (5, 6, 8)

== See also ==
- Unreleased Prince projects
