= Sign o' the Times (film) =

1987 concert film by Prince

- Theatrical release poster
- Directed by: Prince
- Produced by: Robert Cavallo; Joseph Ruffalo; Steven Fargnoli
- Starring: Prince
- Cinematography: Peter Sinclair
- Edited by: Steve Purcell
- Music by: Prince
- Production companies: Paisley Park Films; Purple Films
- Distributed by: Cineplex-Odeon Films (Universal Pictures)
- Release dates: October 29, 1987 (Detroit); November 20, 1987
- Running time: 85 minutes
- Country: United States
- Language: English
- Box office: $3 million

Sign o' the Times (styled Sign "☮" the Times) is a 1987 American concert film directed by, scored by, and starring Prince.

In 1987, to capitalize on his growing success in Europe, Prince toured extensively to promote the album of the same name and sales increased accordingly. However, the United States remained resistant to his latest album, and sales began to drop; it was at this point that Prince decided to film a live concert promoting the new material, for eventual North American theatrical distribution. Despite critical acclaim, it was a box office bomb.

The film features the band that accompanied Prince on the 1987 Sign o' the Times Tour: dancer Cat Glover, keyboardist Boni Boyer, bassist Levi Seacer Jr., guitarist Miko Weaver, drummer Sheila E., keyboardist Doctor Fink, and the horn section of Eric Leeds and Atlanta Bliss; Wally Safford and Greg Brooks (of The Bodyguards from the Revolution era) reprised their roles as dancers, vocalists and comic foils. The documentary sees the group perform live onstage; although "U Got the Look", featuring Sheena Easton, is represented by its promotional music video.

== Background ==
The film was originally intended to consist of live material filmed in the Ahoy in Rotterdam, Netherlands on June 26–28 and in the Sportpaleis in Antwerp, Belgium on June 29. However, the footage from these concerts was deemed unsatisfactory, partly due to the film being grainy and unusable, but also because Prince was not satisfied with the sound. Sound engineer Michiel Hoogenboezem stated in Dutch newspaper De Volkskrant that the recording itself was good. Consequently, the live performance was reshot at Prince's Paisley Park Studios (where the between-song segues were also filmed). According to saxophonist Eric Leeds, around 80% of the final film was drawn from the Paisley Park reshoot. A few hundred extras filled up the soundstage as Prince and the band lip-synched their way through the pre-recorded concert recording.

Most of the songs are linked by a themed narrative and many film critics were quick to praise Prince as being a better actor live than in the previous year's unsuccessful romantic comedy Under the Cherry Moon. In total, 13 songs appear on the video - 11 from Sign o' the Times and two others - a brief piano version of "Little Red Corvette" and a cover version of Charlie Parker's "Now's the Time" (performed without Prince and showcasing each member of the band). Initially, there had been plans to include the full concert which featured many other non-Sign o' the Times songs (including "Kiss", "1999", "Purple Rain", "When Doves Cry", "Girls & Boys", and "Let's Go Crazy") but these songs were eventually dropped.

In the musical coda for "I Could Never Take the Place of Your Man", the horn section, Eric Leeds, and trumpeter Atlanta Bliss lifts a section from "Rockhard In a Funky Place", a Camille track, also on the Crystal Ball track listing, but lost when the 3-LP set was trimmed down. It would later be heard on The Black Album.

== Music ==
Set list

1. "Sign o' the Times"
2. "Play in the Sunshine"
3. "Little Red Corvette"/"Housequake"
4. "Slow Love"
5. "I Could Never Take the Place of Your Man"
6. "Hot Thing"
7. "Now's the Time" (Charlie Parker cover by the band excluding Prince)
8. Drum solo by Sheila E.
9. "U Got the Look"
10. "If I Was Your Girlfriend"
11. "Forever in My Life"/"It"
12. "It's Gonna Be a Beautiful Night"
13. "The Cross"

== Release and reception ==
Sign o' the Times premiered in Detroit on October 29, 1987, and was released nationwide in 234 key locations on November 20. Despite critical praise for Prince as a live performer, it did not perform very well commercially and quickly dropped from theaters; album sales weren't really boosted by the film and it quickly slid out of view in the United States. Nonetheless, when released on VHS the following year, it became extremely popular and received positive notices, particularly in the United Kingdom. Q magazine gave it four stars, whilst SKY Magazine suggested that it "was the greatest concert movie ever made". The film holds an 80% score on the review aggregator website Rotten Tomatoes, based on 20 critical reviews.

In 2025, IMAX, Mercury Studios, and Filmrise announced a global, limited run remastered for IMAX from August 29–31, 2025.

=== Home media ===
Alliance Atlantis issued the film on Region 2 DVD in early 2005, although the cut songs still failed to appear with the rest of the footage. A Blu-ray was released in Australia by Via Vision Entertainment and Madman Entertainment on May 9, 2012. The film has yet to be released physically in the United States and has been out of print in the US since 1991.

Showtime acquired distribution rights in 2017 and began airing the film on their premium cable channel. In March 2022, it was added to The Criterion Channel.
