= Eye No =

Song by Prince

from the album Lovesexy
- Recorded: July 25 and 27, 1986 ("The Ball"); December 11 and 17, 1987 ("Eye No")
- Studio: Washington Avenue Warehouse, Edina, Minnesota ("The Ball"); Paisley Park, Chanhassen, Minnesota ("Eye No")
- Genre: R&B
- Length: 5:46 ("Eye No"); 4:34 ("The Ball")
- Producer: Prince

"Eye No", stylized as " No", is a song by American musician Prince, and is the opening track to his 1988 album, Lovesexy.

== Background ==
During the recording sessions that would eventually lead to his 1987 album Sign o' the Times, Prince started recording "The Ball" at the end of July after rehearsals for the Parade Tour, with horns being overdubbed a couple days later. The song was in some configurations of Crystal Ball and would have segued into "Joy in Repetition", however was ultimately dropped.

During the recording sessions for Lovesexy, Prince revisited, rewrote, and rerecorded the track, becoming the studio version of "Eye No".

== Composition ==
"Eye No" opens with chords on the synthesizer and a poem written and spoken by Ingrid Chavez. Rolling Stone writer David Browne described the song as "a jumbled barrage of Sly Stone wails, fatback bass lines, a grinding sax, wah-wah guitar and swarming backup vocals that continually collide with each other".

While "Eye No" is viewed as "sterile", "The Ball" is viewed as a "stankier", Fairlight-driven groove. This may be due to the production of the former being collaborative featuring the members of Prince's band at the time, whereas the latter is primarily Prince. Eric Leeds did state he preferred "The Ball", saying "it was just a little fresher to me."

The song's lyrics also make reference to "Crystal Ball", "Train", and Sheila E.'s "Romance 1600".

== Personnel ==
Adapted from Benoît Clerc and Duane Tudahl.

=== "Eye No" ===
==== Musicians ====
- Prince – lead vocals, backing vocals, electric guitar, synthesizers, claps
- Atlanta Bliss – spoken vocals, trumpet
- Boni Boyer – vocals, Hammond organ
- Greg Brooks, Ingrid Chavez, Wally Safford – spoken vocals
- Sheila E. – backing vocals, drums
- Doctor Fink – synthesizers
- Eric Leeds – saxophone
- Levi Seacer Jr. – bass
- Miko Weaver – electric guitar

==== Production ====
- Prince – producer
- Eddie Miller – recording engineer

=== "The Ball" ===
==== Musicians ====
- Prince – lead vocals, spoken vocals, backing vocals, electric guitar, bass, synthesizers, Fairlight CMI, clavinet, drums, claps
- Jerome Benton, Greg Brooks, Susannah Melvoin, Wally Safford – backing vocals
- Atlanta Bliss – trumpet
- Eric Leeds – saxophone

==== Production ====
- Prince – producer
- Susan Rogers – recording engineer
- Todd Herreman – assistant recording engineer
