= Alphabet St. =

1988 single by Prince

- UK 7-inch single

Single by Prince

from the album Lovesexy
- B-side: "Alphabet St. (This is not music, this is a trip)"
- Released: April 15, 1988 (UK)
- Recorded: December 30, 1987
- Studio: Paisley Park, Chanhassen, Minnesota, US
- Genre: Funk; funk rock
- Length: 2:25 (7-inch and video edit); 5:39 (12-inch and album version)
- Label: Paisley Park
- Songwriter: Prince
- Producer: Prince

Prince singles chronology
"I Could Never Take the Place of Your Man" (1987)	"Alphabet St." (1988)	"Glam Slam" (1988)

"Alphabet St." is a song from American musician Prince's tenth album, Lovesexy (1988). It was the first single from that album and the album's only top 10 single, reaching the top 10 in both the UK and US. Initially written as an acoustic blues song, the song's final version includes a rap by Cat Glover and is full of samples. "Alphabet St." generally echoes themes from the rest of Lovesexy.

The B-side is a remix of "Alphabet St." called "Alphabet St. ("This is not music, this is a trip")". The title and other phrases are repeated at the beginning of the song, but essentially it is an instrumental with a few minor changes. "Alphabet St." was the first Prince single released as a CD, albeit only in the UK and Japan. A promo CD was issued in the US.

== Critical reception ==
In his review of the song, Paul Clements from Melody Maker felt that "as a lighthearted bubblegum pastiche, it fairly shimmers. There's some judiciously spare scratch guitar, the usual assortment of percolating percussion, and a magnificent tumbling drum lick." He also noted its "almost shocking austerity", and concluded, "Hopefully, a ticklish harbinger of a long, deliciously hot summer." Sean O'Hagan from NME wrote, "'Alphabet St' is, naturally, a record of rare brilliance. It unleashes its outre funk ideology over one of those patented Prince guitar riffs—a clipped, chunky groove that slips into the cerebral space once occupied by the subliminal 'Kiss' coda. From then on, the boy has it easy. 'Alphabet St' is meatier and a lot less meandering than much of the Madhouse future funk of 'Black', stating its case with a hip-shaking sass that is one of the maverick ruler's stock signatures."

The single received critical acclaim from Cashbox magazine. The reviewer praised Prince's "endless capacity to expand the reaches of sound," describing the track as a "herky-jerky little ditty that belies the sophistication within." Highlighting his innate "sixth sense" for crafting essential pop elements, the publication noted that the song's unusual melody would strongly resonate with radio audiences. Consequently, the magazine projected a highly probable chart success and widespread airplay across multiple radio formats.

== Music video ==
Directed by Patrick R. Epstein and produced on very short notice on March 20, 1988 by filmmaker Michael R. Barnard, the music video for "Alphabet St." shows Prince walking and driving a late 60's Ford Thunderbird through an environment made out of letters. The video contains hidden messages. The first one appears after the end of the first verse ("She'll want me from my head to my feet"), where there is a split second image with the hidden message "Don't buy The Black Album, I'm sorry." The second image says B "heaven is so beautiful"; the third image is D "4 the light dance"; the fourth image is G "funk guitar"; the fifth image is H (heroin) "is 4 punks"; the sixth image, when Prince is in the Thunderbird, says "if U don't mind". The final one is when Prince dances on the Thunderbird, "GOD I LOVE U ♡" being shown for a split second.

== Track listings ==
- 7-inch single

A. "Alphabet St." (edit) – 2:25
B. "Alphabet St." (cont.) – 3:14

- 12-inch and CD single
1. "Alphabet St." (album version) – 5:38
2. "Alphabet St. ("This is not music, this is a trip")" – 7:48
- CD promo
1. "Alphabet St." (edit) – 2:25
2. "Alphabet St." (LP version) – 5:38
3. "Alphabet St." (extended version) – 5:40
4. "Alphabet St. ("This is not music, this is a trip")" [Listed as "Alphabet St."] – 7:48

== Personnel ==
Credits sourced from Benoît Clerc and Guitarcloud

- Prince – lead and backing vocals, electric guitar, Roland D-50, synthesizers, bass guitar, Linn LM-1, Dynacord ADD-One, cuíca, handclaps
- Sheila E. – drums, handclaps
- Eric Leeds – saxophone
- Atlanta Bliss – trumpet
- Cat Glover – rap, backing vocals
- Boni Boyer – backing vocals
- Ingrid Chavez – spoken voice

== Charts ==
=== Weekly charts ===
Weekly chart performance for "Alphabet St."
Chart (1988)	Peak position
Australia (ARIA)	20
Belgium (Ultratop 50 Flanders)	9
Canada Top Singles (RPM)	14
Denmark (IFPI)	2
Europe (Eurochart Hot 100)	8
Finland (Suomen virallinen lista)	2
France (SNEP)	47
Iceland (Íslenski Listinn Topp 10)	9
Ireland (IRMA)	3
Italy (Musica e Dischi)	3
Italy Airplay (Music & Media)	2
Luxembourg (Radio Luxembourg)	5
Netherlands (Dutch Top 40)	5
Netherlands (Single Top 100)	3
New Zealand (Recorded Music NZ)	1
Norway (VG-lista)	1
Sweden (Sverigetopplistan)	5
Switzerland (Schweizer Hitparade)	5
UK Singles (Official Charts)	9
US Billboard Hot 100	8
US Dance Singles Sales (Billboard)	7
US Hot R&B/Hip-Hop Songs (Billboard)	3
US Cash Box Top 100	9
West Germany (GfK)	18

=== Year-end charts ===
1988 year-end chart performance for "Alphabet St."
Chart (1988)	Position
Belgium (Ultratop)	72
Netherlands (Dutch Top 40)	46
Netherlands (Single Top 100)	36
New Zealand (Recorded Music NZ)	22
US Hot R&B/Hip-Hop Songs (Billboard)	60
