= List of unreleased projects by Prince =

Prince was well known in the entertainment industry for having a vast body of work that remains unreleased. It has been said that his vault contains multiple unreleased albums and more than 50 fully produced music videos that have never been released, along with albums and other media. The following is a list, in rough chronological order, of the most prominent of these unreleased works. Many were later released and circulated among collectors as bootlegs.

== 1976 demo tape ==
The self-titled tape contains versions of released songs that were composed, written, and sung by Prince during sessions at Sound 80 Studios at the age of 18. He designed cover art for the 1/4" reel, and its submission to Warner Bros. would lead to his signing. In June 2023, an eponymous demo reel from 1976 was put up for auction after it was discovered in the attic of record executive Russ Thyret, who would later sign Prince for his debut album For You, by record executive Jeff Gold, seller of valuable musical artifacts. Gold was contacted by Thyret's wife after his death to sell the accumulation of the executive's career. When put up for auction, the tape contents were ripped and transferred to a CD-R that was to be included with the purchase.

=== Track listing ===
1. "Just as Long as We're Together"
2. "My Love Is Forever"
3. "Jelly Jam"

== The Rebels ==
Before Prince formed the Time, he considered using his backing band as a side-project called the Rebels. The 1979 project was a group effort, with songs being written and sung by the various members (only Bobby Z and Dr. Fink did not sing). André Cymone and Dez Dickerson each contributed material and a few numbers were sung by Gayle Chapman. Instead of making something that sounded similar to his R&B solo output, Prince wanted go into more rock elements of songs such as "I'm Yours" and "Bambi". The project was eventually shelved feeling that the material sounded too generic, but two of the songs composed by Prince were re-recorded and released much later: "If I Love U 2 Night" by Mica Paris (and later by Prince's wife-to-be Mayte Garcia) and "You" (renamed "U") by Paula Abdul. The original Prince guide vocal for "If I Love U 2 Nite" appeared by mistake on the rare Mica Paris Stand for Love EP, of which only a handful exist. From 10 to 21 July 1979, the band recorded nine tracks together at Mountain Ears Sound Studio, Boulder, CO, US:

- "Too Long"
- "Disco Away"
- "Thrill You or Kill You"
- "You"
- "If I Love You Tonight"
- "The Loser"
- "Hard to Get"
- Untitled instrumental by Dez Dickerson
- Untitled instrumental by André Cymone

No further sessions under the name "The Rebels" are known to have taken place.

== The Second Coming ==
The Second Coming was planned to be a documentary film and live album from Prince's Controversy Tour directed by Chuck Statler, that was shot during the 7 March 1982 concert at Bloomington, Minnesota. The tour was professionally filmed, with a storyline between songs, but the project was abandoned, likely due to Prince's schedule producing the Time and Vanity 6. The title comes from a prerecorded a cappella intro to the tour, immediately preceding the song "Uptown".

Set list of the 7 March 1982 show at the Met Center, Bloomington, MN, US

1. Intro: "The Second Coming"
2. "Uptown"
3. "Why You Wanna Treat Me So Bad?"
4. "When You Were Mine"
5. "I Wanna Be Your Lover"
6. "Head"
7. "Annie Christian"
8. "Dirty Mind"
9. "Do Me, Baby"
10. "Controversy"
11. "Let's Work"
12. "Jack U Off"
13. "Private Joy"

== Apollonia 6 film ==
A mini film project as four-track video was filmed, loosely based on the Apollonia 6 album. It was directed by Brian Thomson, an Australian production designer of the original stage versions of The Rocky Horror Show and Jesus Christ Superstar, and scripted by Keith Williams (concept writer for music videos by Phil Collins, Ray Parker Jr., and Donna Summer), with a cast comprising Ricky Nelson (as "Mr. Christian"), Edy Williams and Buck Henry. Shot in a Los Angeles film studio in 1985, and produced by British video firm Limelight, the video never went beyond the rough-cut stage. The songs featured on the film are "Happy Birthday, Mr. Christian", "Sex Shooter", "Blue Limousine" and "Ooo She She Wa Wa". The plot introduced three lingerie-clad widows gathered to listen to the reading of Mr. Christian's will and testament, which leaves them nothing and encourages them to work. The imagery and set is very 1960s revamped into 1980s colorful graphic trends. The scenes show prominent neon words such as "FILL" at a gas station for "Blue Limousine", where Brenda Bennett has the main vocal role, "EAT" at a diner for "Ooo She Wa Wa", where Susan Moonsie leads while the two others find themselves struggling in front of piles of dirty dishes to wash. The part featuring Apollonia in the leading role features the word 'BUY' in a supermarket set.

== The Flesh ==
The Flesh was a project of live jam sessions recorded in late 1985 to early 1986. The project was abandoned when Prince began finalizing work on Parade although a small instrumental portion of a track called "Junk Music" made it into the film Under the Cherry Moon.

The Flesh was a kind of precursor to Madhouse. All the tracks were jazz-funk instrumentals. The songs were recorded in 3 sessions soon after Christmas 1985 at Sunset Sound.

The first session was on December 28, 1985:
Prince, Eric Leeds, Sheila E. and Levi Seacer Jr. recorded 8 tracks:

- "Slaughterhouse"
- "U Just Can't Stop"
- "Run Amok"
- "Mobile"
- "Madrid"
- "Breathless"
- "High Calonic"
- "12 Keys"

Prince was so pleased with the results that they all returned to the studio 2 days later to record another 3 tracks:

- "U Gotta Shake Something"
- "Voodoo Who"
- "Finest Whiskey"

On January 5, 1986, Prince, Leeds, Sheila E. and Seacer returned to the studio once more, this time with Wendy & Lisa, and Wendy's brother, Jonathan Melvoin. They recorded another 6 tracks:

- "Groove in C Minor"
- "Slow Groove in G Major"
- "Groove in G Flat Minor"
- "Junk Music"
- "Up from Below"
- "Y'all Want Some More"

On January 22, 1986, Prince assembled an album by "The Flesh" entitled which consisted of the following tracks:

Side one

- "Junk Music (20:25)"

Side two

- "U Gotta Shake Something (15:23)"
- "Up From Below (4:57)"
- "Conversation Piece (3:16)" – recorded separately on January 12, 1986
- "Y'all Want Some More (1:36)"

"Junk Music" was originally an hour long, but was edited down to 20 minutes for the album (a little of it can be heard in Under the Cherry Moon during the scene where Christopher Tracy races Mary). Another track from around this time, "A Couple of Miles", was an instrumental that Prince recorded on December 26, 1985 (he also recorded "Can I Play with U" in the same session), to which Leeds added some saxophone on December 30. The album was shelved due to the fact that Prince's time was taken up with other projects (Under the Cherry Moon, Parade and the Family). Prince liked the idea of releasing an instrumental jazz-funk album under a pseudonym. He finally got around to it in 1987, but renamed the project Madhouse and ditched the old Flesh tracks in favor of fresh new recordings.

== Prince and the Revolution: Dream Factory ==
Dream Factory was a double LP project recorded with the Revolution from 1986. The entire band was invited into the studio and contributed to most of the original tracks, so it meant that the songs would either be full band performances, solo recordings by Prince or largely recorded by Prince with certain members contributing, namely Wendy Melvoin and Lisa Coleman. Many of the tracks would later be incorporated into Crystal Ball (see below) or be released through other outlets over the years.

== Camille ==
Camille is an unreleased album by Prince, recorded in 1986. The album was planned to consist of 8 tracks recorded by the singer in a feminine, sped up vocal. The album was to be released under the name Camille (who would not be pictured on the cover) and not as a Prince album. The album was canceled weeks prior to its release and most of the tracks were incorporated into the unreleased album Crystal Ball, which evolved into Sign o' the Times. Most of the music had been released officially in some form or another, however, one song, "Rebirth of the Flesh" remained unreleased in its original form until 2020 when it was released on Sign o' the Times – Super Deluxe Edition. In 2001, a live rehearsal of "Rebirth of the Flesh" recorded with the Sign o' the Times band was released on Prince's website. This version, however, had profanity edited from the lyrics.

== Crystal Ball ==
Crystal Ball was a 3-LP set to be released in 1986, The set was to consist of various tracks from 1985 to 1986. Although several Dream Factory tracks were incorporated, this set was to be marketed as a solo album by Prince. Warner Bros. Records balked at the album's length so Prince begrudgingly trimmed it to the 2-LP Sign o' the Times, which many still consider to be his best album (although Purple Rain was his most successful). The album is notable for two reasons; it was the last studio album to be recorded with The Revolution and the events said to have surrounded its recording led to the resignation of both Wendy & Lisa, effectively dissolving Prince's band until the creation of the New Power Generation.

== Madhouse: 24 ==
Prince worked on a third Madhouse album recorded during July–December 1988, with a planned release in early 1989, featuring the cover model Maneca Lightner. The album has never materialized. Some of the tracks were altered (in fact, only 21 "The Dopamine Rush") and reused on Eric Leeds' Times Squared album released in 1991. A totally different version of 24 was recorded with members of The New Power Generation and Eric Leeds in 1993, but this also was not released, with the exception of the track "17" of the 1-800-NEW-FUNK compilation album. Some of the tracks were on the rare "The Versace Experience" cassette. Both versions of the album circulate on the internet.

=== Track listings ===
1989 configuration

1. "17 (Penetration)"
2. "18 (R U Legal Yet?)"
3. "19 (Jailbait)"
4. "20 (A Girl and Her Puppy)"
5. "21–24 (The Dopamine Rush Suite)" (Incorporates "21 (The Dopamine Rush)", "22 (Amsterdam)", "23 (Spanish Eros)" and "24 (Orgasm)")

1994 configuration

1. "17"
2. "Rootie Kazootie"
3. "Space"
4. "Guitar Segue"
5. "Asswoop"
6. "Ethereal Segue"
7. "Parlor Games"
8. "Michael Segue"
9. "(Got 2) Give It Up"
10. "Sonny Segue"

May 1995 configuration

1. "17"
2. "Rootie Kazootie"
3. "Space"
4. "Guitar Segue"
5. "Asswoop"
6. "Ethereal Segue"
7. "Parlor Games"
8. "Michael Segue"
9. "Overture #5"
10. "Overture #6"
11. "18 & Over"
12. "(Got 2) Give It Up" (edit)
13. "Sonny Segue"

== Sheila E.: Untitled 1989 album ==
An album was recorded by Sheila E., between early 1987 and late 1988, and planned for release in 1989. The album was abandoned when Sheila E. left Paisley Park Records in early 1989, and most of the album's tracks remain unreleased. The only track from the album to have been released is "Scarlet Pussy" (credited to Camille), which was included as the b-side of "I Wish U Heaven". The album included a cover of Donny Hathaway's "The Ghetto". Two other tracks were resurrected for later projects, however. In mid-September, 1993, "Latino Barbie Doll" was tried out for Mayte during initial sessions for her solo debut album, and was included on an initial configuration of the album, titled Latino Barbie Doll, before being removed from later configurations as the album developed into Child of the Sun. During the A Celebration week in June 2000, computer screens at Paisley Park Studios offered names of a selection of tracks which users could vote on for inclusion on Crystal Ball Volume II; "3 Nigs Watchin' a Kung Fu Movie" was included on the list and was chosen by fans, the project was ultimately abandoned.

=== Track listing ===
Side one

- "3 Nigs Watchin' a Kung Fu Movie"
- "It's a Hard Life" (includes no Prince input)
- "Chicken Legs" (includes no Prince input)
- "Knucklehead"
- "Latino Barbie Doll"

Side two

- "Soul Company"
- "Day After Day" (includes no Prince input)
- "Girl Power"
- "The Ghetto"
- "Scarlet Pussy"

== The Time: Corporate World ==
An unreleased studio album by The Time, recorded in Summer 1989 and planned for release in November 1989. Like previous albums by The Time, all tracks featured Prince heavily as unique writer and musician, with Morris Day adding vocals as the only member of the band to appear on the album. The album was submitted to Warner Bros., and planned for release on 14 November 1989, with "Nine Lives" planned as the first single. Warner Bros. stopped the release, however, feeling that other members of the band should be brought in to contribute to the album. Following a meeting with Prince, the band members Jesse Johnson, Monte Moir, Terry Lewis and Jimmy Jam began contributing songs to the album without input by Prince, as well as revising "Chocolate" and "Jerk Out" (composed by Prince); the resulting album became The Time's fourth album Pandemonium. Of the tracks included on Corporate World, three tracks were kept for Pandemonium: "Donald Trump (Black Version)", "Data Bank" and "My Summertime Thang". Four other tracks were kept as The Time's contribution to Prince's twelfth album Graffiti Bridge: "Love Machine", "Shake!", "The Latest Fashion" and "Release It". "Murph Drag" was included on NPG Ahdio Show #3 in 2001, but was not available as a separate track. Only "Nine Lives" and "Corporate World" have not been released in any form.

=== Track listing ===
1. "Murph Drag"
2. "Nine Lives"
3. "Donald Trump (Black Version)"
4. "Love Machine"
5. "Data Bank"
6. "Shake!"
7. "Corporate World"
8. "The Latest Fashion"
9. "Release It"
10. "My Summertime Thang"
11. "Rollerskate"

== Rave unto the Joy Fantastic ==
The original Rave unto the Joy Fantastic album was shelved when Prince started working on the Batman soundtrack in late 1988. The album shared some tracks with Graffiti Bridge and was to be a house music album; the title track was finally released in 1999 slightly remixed on a new album of the same name.

=== Track listings ===
27 October 1988 configuration

The specific sequence of tracks are unknown, but tracks known to have been included are:

- "The Voice Inside"
- "Melody Cool" (an updated version with Mavis Staples lead vocals was released on Graffiti Bridge)
- "Rave unto the Joy Fantastic" (an edited and reworked version released on Rave Un2 the Joy Fantastic)
- "God is Alive"
- "If I Had a Harem"
- "Stimulation"
- "Still Would Stand All Time" (a version with background vocals overdubs by The Steeles over Prince's original background vocals was released on Graffiti Bridge)
- "Elephants & Flowers" (an other version with different verses was released on Graffiti Bridge)
- "Big House"
- "We Got the Power" (sampled in Batdance Bat Mix)

No details are known about the sequence, other than that "The Voice Inside" is known to have segued into "Melody Cool".

27 November 1988 configuration

1. "Rave unto the Joy Fantastic"
2. "If I Had a Harem"
3. "The Voice Inside"
4. "Melody Cool"
5. "Stimulation"
6. "Elephants & Flowers"
7. "God is Alive"
8. "Still Would Stand All Time"

Mid-January 1989 configuration

1. "Rave unto the Joy Fantastic"
2. "If I Had a Harem"
3. "Good Judy Girlfriend" (a re-recording by Carmen Electra was released on her only album Carmen Electra)
4. "Pink Cashmere" (released on The Hits/The B-Sides)
5. "Electric Chair" (released on Batman)
6. "Am I Without U?"
7. "God is Alive"
8. "Still Would Stand All Time" (released on Graffiti Bridge)
9. "Moonbeam Levels" (released on Prince 4Ever)

== Flash ==
In 1989, Prince formed a new band called Flash / MC Flash (both names were considered for use), featuring Margie Cox (of Ta Mara and the Seen) as lead singer. In July, Cox recorded 25 songs written by Prince for a planned album. No M.C. Flash album or singles were ever released. The only songs to be released as a result of Prince and Cox's work together was her cover of Prince's "Standing at the Altar" for his 1994 compilation album 1-800-NEW-FUNK, and the B-side of that single, "Whistlin' Kenny".

=== Track listing ===
Side one

- "R U There?"
- "Brand New Boy"
- "Warden in the Prison of Love"
- "Bed of Roses"
- "Good Man"
- "Whistlin' Kenny"

Side two

- "We Can Hang"
- "Curious Blue"
- "Girls Will Be Girls"
- "Good Body Every Evening"

== The Tora Tora Experience ==
At the height of his troubles with Warner Bros. Records in 1994, Prince contributed under the moniker Tora Tora on the NPG's Exodus album. Happy with this pseudonym, a full album was recorded, but it remains unreleased. Very little is known about this project, but it was mentioned on the 1995 "Sampler Experience" cassette by the tracks "(Lemme See Your Body) Get Loose!" a remix of "Loose!" from Prince's 1994 Come album.

== The Undertaker ==
This recording was made in a continuous single live-in-the-studio pass in collaboration with NPG drummer Michael Bland and bassist Sonny T. Prince originally intended to give this live CD away free with 1,000 copies of Guitar Player magazine in 1994 (uploading an original The Undertaker CD to iTunes, shows the year 1995 as the year the CD was "released"), but he was reportedly barred by Warner Bros. from doing so. Copies were leaked and bootlegged. The songs were guitar-heavy versions of rock and blues numbers, including a cover of The Rolling Stones' "Honky Tonk Women" and new recording of "Bambi" (originally from 1979's Prince). The title track was a cover of a song previously given to Mavis Staples, while "The Ride", "Zannalee", and "Dolphin" would all be re-recorded future releases. A video recording of the performance was released in Europe (on VHS and Laserdisc) with small edits throughout the performance and "Dolphin" replaced by the audio track from the official video of the song from The Gold Experience.

=== Track listing ===
1. "The Ride" – 10:54
2. "Poor Goo" – 4:26
3. "Honky Tonk Women" – 3:00
4. "Bambi" – 4:49
5. "Zannalee (prelude)" – 0:44
6. "The Undertaker" – 9:50
7. "Dolphin" – 3:40

== "Live" ==
"Live" is an unreleased multiple-disc album, offered to Warner Bros. in January 1995. Little is known about the contents, other than it contained live tracks recorded on tours between 1987 and 1993: the Sign o' the Times Tour, the Lovesexy Tour, the Nude Tour, the Diamonds and Pearls Tour, and the Act I and Act II tours. It was supposed to contain four discs, but it is unknown if the material was arranged chronologically or in another way. The album is unrelated to the "Live" single planned for release the previous year, and The Live Experience album planned for release later in 1995, both of which were planned to be credited to and contained live tracks recorded in 1994 and 1995 consecutively.

== The Live Experience ==
Unreleased live album, worked on in 1995. Little is known about the contents, other than it contained live tracks recorded at the 8 June 1995 show at Glam Slam, Miami Beach, FL, US (celebrating Prince's 37th birthday; his second as O(+>). Specific tracks are not known, and it is not known how many discs were planned, or whether the contents were arranged chronologically or sequenced another way. The album is unrelated to the "Live" single planned for release the previous year (which contained tracks recorded in 1994), and the "Live" album planned for release earlier in 1995 (which was planned to be credited to Prince and contained live tracks recorded between 1987 and 1993).

Set list of the 8 June 1995 show at Glam Slam, Miami Beach, FL, US

1. "Endorphinmachine"
2. "The Jam"
3. "Shhh"
4. "Days of Wild"
5. "Now"
6. "Funky Stuff"
7. "The Most Beautiful Girl in the World"
8. "P. Control"
9. "Letitgo"
10. "Pink Cashmere"
11. "(Lemme See Your Body) Get Loose!" (unreleased remix of "Loose!")
12. "Count the Days"
13. "Return of the Bump Squad"
14. Arabic intro
15. "7"
16. "Get Wild"
17. "Johnny"
18. "Billy Jack Bitch"
19. "Gold"

== New World ==
New World is thought to be an unreleased album worked on in 1995. It was mentioned by Mayte in an interview with Uptown magazine in July, 1995, and it is possible that she was mistaken in naming the album, and it was in fact Emancipation (or that Emancipation was briefly known as New World, even though the name Emancipation had already been used). Very little is known about the album, although Mayte described it as a "techno" album, and is believed to have included both "New World", which was later released on Emancipation, "The Same December", which was later released on Chaos and Disorder, and "Goodbye", which was later released on "Crystal Ball".

=== Track listing ===
1. "Synasthesia"
2. "New World"
3. "Candle Burns"
4. "Empty Room"
5. "Feel Good"
6. "I'm a DJ"
7. "2020"
8. "Funky Design"
9. "The Same December"
10. "Goodbye"

== The Vault – Volumes I, II and III ==
The Vault – Volumes I, II and III is a series of three albums announced on 22 December 1995 during a press release announcing that Prince had given notice to Warner Bros. of his desire to terminate his contract. The albums, to be credited to Prince, were to serve as the fulfillment of his contract, which intended to follow by releasing Emancipation. They are believed to be three separate single-disc albums, but as they were only mentioned once on a press release, with no distinction between the three volumes, they are listed here together. As both Chaos and Disorder and The Vault... Old Friends 4 Sale were submitted to Warner Bros. in April 1996, the common assumption has been that these albums made up two of the volumes of The Vault – Volumes I, II and III.

Seven tracks included on the two releases ("Dinner with Delores", "I Rock, Therefore I Am", "Into the Light", "I Will", "Dig U Better Dead", "Had U" and "Sarah") were recorded between February and April 1996, however, after the press release announcing The Vault – Volumes I, II, and III, indicating that some changes took place before the formation of Chaos and Disorder and The Vault...Old Friends 4 Sale. Tracks believed to have been included on The Vault – Volumes I, II, and III include the following:

- "Chaos and Disorder"
- "I Like It There"
- "The Same December"
- "Right the Wrong"
- "Zannalee"
- "The Rest of My Life"
- "It's About That Walk"
- "She Spoke 2 Me"
- "5 Women"
- "When the Lights Go Down"
- "My Little Pill"
- "There Is Lonely"
- "Old Friends 4 Sale"
- "Extraordinary"

It is likely that several more tracks were included, but no details are known. It is possible, however, that the project was announced in the press release without any corresponding albums completed (indicated by the generic title The Vault – Volumes I, II and III), and that the project was never completed before work on Chaos and Disorder and The Vault...Old Friends 4 Sale took over.

== Prince and Mayte: Happy Tears ==
With the pregnancy of Prince's then-wife Mayte Garcia, Prince was inspired to make and announce a children's music album called Happy Tears, credited to Prince and Mayte. The album was supposed to have been released November 1996. The album was going to include a book of children's stories with it, also credited to Prince and Mayte. To promote the album, Prince guest-starred on the show Muppets Tonight and performed the only song confirmed that would have been included on the album, "She Gave Her Angels", which remained unreleased until inclusion on the Crystal Ball set. The album was likely canceled because of Prince's son's death one week after birth.

== The Dawn ==
The Dawn was to be the first Prince album after Emancipation, but it was shelved in 1997. The album was at that point slated to be the accompanying soundtrack to a film of the same name, but because of the box office failure of Graffiti Bridge, this wasn't possible. An acoustic version of the title track can be found on The Truth. Prince had often thought of releasing an album called The Dawn at many points during his career. The earliest known incarnation of 'The Dawn' was from 1986, and seems to have been some kind of musical (an idea that eventually resurfaced as 'Graffiti Bridge'). Another incarnation of 'The Dawn' was assembled around 1994, soon after Prince changed his stage name to an unpronounceable symbol. This time the content was made from tracks that would later surface on Come and The Gold Experience. The last known incarnation of the album was assembled in 1996/1997, this time it came very close to release, and was even advertised on the back of the free cassette single of "The Holy River" that was given away at Borders stores in 1997.

=== Tracks believed to have been included on the 1994 album ===
Triple album. Combined tracks that had been previously included on 1993 configurations of Come, along with tracks that would later be released on The Gold Experience and Chaos and Disorder, along with various NPG Operator segues, although the exact track listing is not known.

- "Come"
- "Endorphinmachine"
- "Space"
- "Pheromone"
- "Loose!"
- "Papa"
- "Dark"
- "Dolphin"
- "Poem" (later edited and renamed "Orgasm")
- "Race"
- "Strays of the World"
- "What's My Name"
- "Interactive"
- "Solo"
- "Zannalee"
- "The Most Beautiful Girl in the World"
- "Now"
- "Ripopgodazippa"
- "Shy"
- "Gold"
- "319"
- "Billy Jack Bitch"
- "Chaos and Disorder"
- "Right the Wrong"
- "Acknowledge Me"
- "Listen 2 the Rhythm" (later renamed "The Rhythm of Your ♥")
- "Hide the Bone"
- "Love 4 1 Another" (later renamed "New World")
- "Days of Wild"

Other tracks not included on any configuration of Come, The Gold Experience or Chaos and Disorder that may have been considered for inclusion here include the following:

- "Strawberries"
- "Dream"
- "Laurianne"
- "Dance of Desperation"
- "I Wanna Be Held 2 Night"
- "Emotional Crucifixion"
- "The Ride"
- "Poorgoo"
- "Calhoun Square" (later released on ‘’Crystal Ball’’)
- "It's About That Walk" (later released on The Vault: Old Friends 4 Sale)
- "Slave 2 the Funk"

All tracks listed here are speculative, however.

=== Tracks believed to have been included on the 1996/1997 album ===
- "Welcome 2 the Dawn" (an acoustic version was later released on The Truth)
- "The Most Beautiful Girl in the World (Mustang Mix '96)"

== Mayte: Scorpio ==
Announced by Love4OneAnother.com in 1998, it was due to include some tracks from her debut album Child of the Sun, as well as some newly recorded tracks. It is not known if the album was completed before it was abandoned, however, and the project may have been interrupted by Prince and Mayte's marital issues in late 1998 and early 1999. The title of the album comes from Mayte's astrological sign of the Zodiac. Born on 12 November 1973, she is a Scorpio. Nothing is known about which tracks were intended for the album, but the manufacture in 1998 of the single "Rhythm of Your ♥" (later sold in 2005 on Mayte's website) indicates that "The Rhythm of Your ♥" (possibly renamed "Rhythm of Your ♥") was planned for inclusion.

== Beautiful Strange ==
Worked on in mid- to late 1998. Little is known about the album, although it is thought that the album would have been planned for release around the same time as the Beautiful Strange TV film broadcast in late October 1998. Unlike the TV special, which was mostly a lengthy interview and live footage, the album is thought to be a full studio recording.

Only two tracks are known to have been planned for inclusion on the album: "Beautiful Strange" and "Twisted", a cover version of a track originally written as an instrumental by Wardell Gray in 1949, before having lyrics added by Scottish jazz singer Annie Ross in 1952 and being released as a single (later included on the album King Pleasure Sings/Annie Ross Sings, the same year).

Prince carried around a lyric book titled Beautiful Strange during the first few weeks of the One Nite Alone... Tour in 2002, and lyrics to "Twisted" were seen inside. The contents of the remainder of the lyric book, and of the album, are unknown, and it is not known how complete the album was before it was abandoned to work on the Prince and the Revolution album Roadhouse Garden, and the album Rave Un2 the Joy Fantastic.

While Prince's version of Twisted remains unreleased, "Beautiful Strange" was broadcast as a lyric video during the Beautiful Strange TV film broadcast (released the following year on the Beautiful Strange home video), and a reworked version was released in 2001 on the Rave In2 the Joy Fantastic remix album (marking the only track to be included on the album that had not been included on Rave Un2 the Joy Fantastic).

== Prince and the Revolution: Roadhouse Garden ==
In 1998, Prince announced a comeback album of Prince & the Revolution that consisted of unreleased songs. It was most likely never released because of a dispute with the original Revolution members. One of the mentioned songs, "Splash" was released on Prince's website. According to former Revolution keyboardist Dr. Fink, Prince asked for Wendy and Lisa's input on the album, but he didn't offer any compensation, so they declined his offer. Later, when people asked about the Roadhouse Garden album, his reply was, "Ask Wendy and Lisa".

The specific sequence of tracks is unknown, but tracks believed to have been included are as follows:

- "Roadhouse Garden"
- "Witness 4 The Prosecution"
- "Splash"
- "All My Dreams"
- "In A Large Room With No Light"
- "Empty Room"
- "Wonderful Ass"

== New Funk Sampling Series ==
Unreleased 7-CD set containing more than 700 brief samples of hooks, beats and sounds from tracks recorded by Prince, planned for musicians and DJs to sample. The set was planned for sale for a one-time fee of $700, with no additional royalties necessary for use of the tracks. Website Love4OneAnother.com announced on 28 March 1999, that had commissioned the set, but nothing else was known until an advertisement and some details were posted on NPGOnlineLtd.com in late May 2000. Prince then played a short video promoting the set at a party at Paisley Park Studios, Chanhassen, MN, US, on 16 September 2000. The set was split over seven volumes, subtitled "Bass", "The Human Voice", "Guitar", "Keyboards", "Loops & Percussion", "Sound FX" and "Orchestral". A promotional advertisement for the set mentioned that samples were included from "Kiss", "Raspberry Beret", "When Doves Cry", "Erotic City" and "Days of Wild". Little else is known about the set.

== Crystal Ball Volume II ==
This was a follow-up to the 1998 outtake album Crystal Ball. Fans who attended Prince's Paisley Park Studios during June 2000 were given the opportunity to vote for their favorite outtakes from a list of 23, and 17 were selected. For unknown reasons, the album was never produced.

The tracks included the following:

- "3 Nigs Watchin' a Kung Fu Movie"
- "Adonis & Bathsheba"
- "American Jam"
- "Come Electra Tuesday" (not selected)
- "Electric Intercourse"
- "Everybody Wants What They Don't Got"
- "Evolsidog"
- "Eye Wonder"
- "Girl" (not selected)
- "Girl o' My Dreams"
- "Gotta Stop (Messin' About)" (not selected)
- "If It'll Make U Happy" (not selected)
- "Katrina's Paper Dolls"
- "Kiss" (Unreleased Xtended Version)
- "Love & Sex"
- "Lust U Always"
- "Others Here with Us"
- "She's Just a Baby" (not selected)
- "Strange Way of Saying Eye Love U"
- "Turn It Up"
- "U're All Eye Want"
- "Xtra Lovable"

On top of the selected tracks, "What Should B Souled" and "Wonderful Ass" were also thought to be included for the album.

=== DVD ===
Another little-known project that was due to be released at the same time as Crystal Ball II was an accompanying Crystal Ball DVD. This was to contain music videos made for tracks off both volumes of the Crystal Ball albums.

== A Celebration ==
A Celebration is an unreleased album by Prince, announced on NPG Ahdio Show # 4 (released 15 May 2001). The announcement stated that Prince was in negotiations with a major record store chain to distribute the album, said to contain 20 "remastered re-recordings" of Prince's greatest hits, along with "at least four brand new songs". This album was not released, however (likely due to the Warner Bros. release of The Very Best of Prince in July 2001).

It is not known which songs would have been included on the album, and how much the track list overlapped with the setlists used on the brief A Celebration tour, which was likely initially intended to promote the album, but was cancelled after only six concerts (partly to avoid the appearance of supporting The Very Best of Prince, and partly because of Prince wanting to spend time with his father, whose health was ailing at that point). It is possible that one of the new tracks was "U Make My Sun Shine", which had already been released as a single, but this is purely speculative. It is possible that one of the "remastered re-recordings" included on the album would have been "1999: The New Master", which had been released as a single in 1999, but during the years following the end of the year 1999 Prince viewed the song as "retired" (not playing it live), making its inclusion unlikely.

== When 2 R in Love: The Ballads of Prince ==
Announced for voting as the next Prince release during the A Celebration week in June 2000. Ballads collection. Full track list and sequencing is unknown, but it is known to include the following:

- "Do Me, Baby"
- "Insatiable"
- "Scandalous!"
- "Adore"
- "When 2 R in Love"

== The Hot X-perience ==
In 2000, a vinyl maxi single was announced. It would contain new club remixes of "Hot wit U" featuring Eve.

On 19 July 2000, DJ Wolf played some unreleased mixes, likely from The Hot X-perience, at a club known as the Front in Minneapolis, Minnesota:

- "Hot wit U" (Nasty Girl remix)
- "Hot wit U" (hip-hop version)
- "Underneath the Cream"
- "So Far, So Pleased" (club/dance mix; includes portions of "Rave un2 the Joy Fantastic")
- "Hot wit U" (club/dance mix)

"Underneath the Cream" was later released on Prince's website and an edit of the Nasty Girl Remix was released on the remix album Rave In2 the Joy Fantastic.

== High ==
In 2000, High was fully complete and ready to release in the summer of 2000, but the album was never released. A video was recorded for the song "U Make My Sun Shine", a duet with Angie Stone, and it was also released as a single. A video was also made for "Daisy Chain," featuring Prince playing basketball in his own court at Paisley Park, and "When Eye Lay My Hands on U". Most songs were distributed individually via his NPG Music Club. "Silicon," "Daisy Chain" and "Golden Parachute" were also included on the internet-only The Slaughterhouse project. Prince released The Rainbow Children instead.

=== Track listing ===
1. "Supercute"
2. "Underneath the Cream"
3. "Golden Parachute"
4. "When Will We B Paid?"
5. "The Daisy Chain"
6. "Gamillah"
7. "High"
8. "My Medallion"
9. "U Make My Sun Shine"
10. "When Eye Lay My Hands on U"

== NPG: Peace ==
During the "Hit and Run Tour" in 2001, an NPG single from what was billed as the forthcoming new NPG album, 'Peace' was sold. It featured the title track, "Peace" coupled with "2045: Radical Man". The album remains unreleased, while "2045: Radical Man" was given to Spike Lee for his Bamboozled soundtrack. Instead, "Peace" and "2045: Radical Man" were later released on the internet-only release of The Slaughterhouse. A full track list is not known, if it was ever completed. The album was believed to include:

- "Peace"
- "2045: Radical Man"

Possibly:

- "The Daisy Chain"
- "Gamillah"
- "Northside"

== Untitled Kevin Smith-directed documentary ==
In the summer of 2001, writer/director Kevin Smith contacted Prince to gain permission to use "The Most Beautiful Girl in the World" for a scene in his movie Jay and Silent Bob Strike Back. Although he was denied permission, he agreed to film a documentary of reactions, questions and answers during one of Prince's fan weeks at his recording studios, Paisley Park. Most of the footage comes from five sessions of Prince and Smith discussing music with fans. The footage still resides in Prince's vault, while some was used to promote The Rainbow Children album and as background video at some of his live concerts.

Smith described the experience in his 2002 live video An Evening with Kevin Smith; according to An Evening with Kevin Smith 2: Evening Harder, Prince was intending to edit the film into a promotional movie for Jehovah's Witnesses.

== Madrid 2 Chicago ==
A new album was announced for 2001. Two songs entitled "Madrid 2 Chicago" and "Breathe" were distributed via the NPG Music Club, but the full album remains unreleased.

== All My Dreams ==
During mid-2001/2002 artwork was posted on NPG Music Club for an album called All My Dreams. Because of the title, it was assumed that it included the Dream Factory outtake "All My Dreams". Nothing else is known, and the album has never materialized.

== Last December ==
Announced in the One Nite Alone... tour book in March 2002, the title is a track from The Rainbow Children. The album has never materialized.

== The Very Best of O(+> ==
Announced in the One Nite Alone... tour book in March 2002. Nothing else is known about the album, although from the title it seems likely that the album was a compilation of tracks recorded while Prince used the symbol "Love Symbol" as his name (from 1993 to 2000), although, given licensing, it seems likely this would be restricted to master tracks owned by Prince, rather than by Warner Bros. (eliminating tracks used on The Gold Experience and Chaos and Disorder). Alternatively, it may have included some re-recordings of tracks that were originally released by Warner Bros., but all information about the album is speculative. The title may have been in response to Warner Bros.' release of The Very Best of Prince, which was released in late July 2001, seven months before this album was announced.

== The Chocolate Invasion ==
In 2003 it was announced that the members-only tracks from the first years of the NPG Music Club would be released in a 7-CD boxed set containing:

- C-Note
- Xpectation
- One Nite Alone... – solo piano & voice
- The Chocolate Invasion – Trax from NPGMC Volume 1
- The Slaughterhouse – Trax from NPGMC Volume 2
- "The Glam Slam" club mix
- "The War"

In November 2003, a problem with manufacturing was reported, and the project was put on hold. The only albums that have become available on CD in limited editions before were "The War", available through 1-800-NEW-FUNK in 1998 and One Nite Alone..., sent to NPG Music Club members in 2002 as part of the annual subscription. Furthermore, all albums have been made available for download (in some cases with tracks varying very slightly) via the NPG Music Club at various stages. An excerpt of "The Glam Slam Club Mix" was possibly part of NPG Ahdio Show #11 and available as a free download in December 2001, C-Note and Xpectation were free downloads for members in January 2003 and became available in the NPG Music Club store in 2004, together with One Nite Alone..., The Chocolate Invasion and The Slaughterhouse.

== 3121 film ==
Near the end of 2005, Prince had written and produced for the singer Liza Hernandez (also known as Liza Lena) and, according to the Panamanian news site Prensa.com, "Has maintained a good friendship since they filmed together the film 31-21," and was, according to the site, supposed to be released in April 2006. There are references to the film on a few Prince forums, which, unfortunately for the sake of authenticity, only refer back to quotes from unofficial, unknown, or expired sources. There are no references to the film found on either Prince's official newsletter 3121.com or in the Internet Movie Database. The cover of the 3121 CD reads '3121 – The Music', further fuelling speculation of a 3121 movie. In April 2011, a fully produced trailer for the movie leaked on the net and stated that the movie is "Coming Soon". 3121 movie also has appearances from DJ Rashida and actress Jennifer Gordon.

=== Aftermath ===
After the film was shelved, it was reorganized as a new film named LotusFlow3r.

== Támar: Milk & Honey ==
In 2005 and early 2006, with a planned release in Spring 2006, during the 3121 sessions, Prince and Támar worked on her debut album. Originally titled Beautiful, Loved & Blessed, it was renamed Milk & Honey. Originally, it was going to be released with Prince's 3121, but it was postponed before being cancelled altogether. However, it got a tiny release in Japan before the cancellation. "Beautiful, Loved & Blessed" was later included in a slightly different form on Prince's 3121, "Holla & Shout" was also available as a promotional single, and the song "Kept Woman" was later re-recorded by Bria Valente for her debut album Elixer.

=== Track listing ===
1. "Closer 2 My Heart"
2. "Milk & Honey"
3. "Can't Keep Living Alone"
4. "Holla & Shout"
5. "Kept Woman"
6. "Holy Ground"
7. "Beautiful, Loved & Blessed"
8. "Redhead Stepchild"
9. "All Eye Want Is U"
10. "First Love"
11. "Sunday in the Park"
12. "Beautiful, Loved & Blessed" (reprise)

== The L/C ==
In 2011, Andy Allo posted some songs by Prince and herself on her Facebook account. She has posted a live version of Prince performing "Stratus" and an acoustic version of "Guitar". On that acoustic version of "Guitar", there was meta-data attached to it. The information saying it is from a project called The L/C featuring Prince and Andy Allo.

In November 2015 Prince streamed an acoustic album, Oui Can Luv, featuring Prince and Andy Allo on Tidal for a very short time. It featured the acoustic version of "Guitar".

Possible track listing:

- "Guitar" (acoustic version)
- "Oui Can Love"
- "Love Is a Losing Game"
- "I Love U in Me"

== Montreux live concert ==
Announced in 2013 via a promotional video at the website 20pr1nc3.com, but not materialized. Supposed to be a three-hour concert film, produced through "NPG Films".

== Piano & a Microphone ==
Piano & a Microphone is an unreleased live album by Prince recorded during his final full show of the Piano & a Microphone Tour at the Fox Theatre, Atlanta, GA, US on 14 April 2016.

Prince announced during his last public appearance at Paisley Park Studios on 17 April 2016 (a.m.) that the full show had been mixed for a live release. Specific tracks are not known, and it is not known if a physical release was planned.

The live recording of "Black Sweat" from this show was made available from Tidal the next day, on 18 April 2016 as the Purple Pick of the Week, and became the final official release of music by Prince before his death on 21 April 2016.

Set list of the 14 April 2016 show at the Fox Theater, Atlanta, GA, US

1. "Confluence" (pre-recorded intro)
2. "When Will We B Paid?"
3. "The Max"
4. "Black Sweat"
5. "Girl"
6. "I Would Die 4 U"
7. "Baby I'm a Star"
8. "The Ballad Of Dorothy Parker/Four"
9. "Dark"
10. "Indifference"
11. "Eye Love U, But Eye Don't Trust U Anymore"
12. "Little Red Corvette/Dirty Mind/Linus and Lucy"
13. "Nothing Compares 2 U"
14. "Cream"
15. "Black Muse"
16. "How Come U Don't Call Me Anymore?"
17. "Waiting in Vain/If I Was Your Girlfriend"
18. "Sometimes It Snows in April"
19. "Purple Rain"
20. "The Beautiful Ones"
21. "Diamonds and Pearls"
22. "Purple Rain" (coda)
