= Glam Slam =

- UK 7" single

Single by Prince

from the album Lovesexy
- B-side: "Escape"
- Released: July 11, 1988
- Recorded: December 1987
- Studio: Paisley Park, Chanhassen, Minnesota, US
- Genre: Psychedelia; dream pop; shoegaze
- Length: 3:28 (7" edit); 5:04 (album); 8:52 (12” single)
- Label: Paisley Park
- Songwriter: Prince
- Producer: Prince

Prince singles chronology
"Alphabet St." (1988)	"Glam Slam" (1988)	"I Wish U Heaven" (1988)

"Glam Slam" is a song by American musician Prince, and the second single from his tenth album, Lovesexy (1988). The song has sexual overtones with a spiritual undertone and fits the Lovesexy theme of integrating God and sex. The song is complex musically, recalling "Life Can Be So Nice" from Parade. It ends with a chorus of strings (played on the keyboard). A 12" single remix of the song by Shep Pettibone and Steve Peck mainly includes dance beats and extra instrumentation and samples.

The B-side, "Escape (Free yo mind from this rat race)", is somewhat of a remix, sampling the chorus from "Glam Slam", but adding all new lyrics and a funky bass guitar. The theme of "Escape" is more anti-drugs and gangs and is generally more of a dance number than "Glam Slam". The edit of "Escape" was included on 1993's The Hits/The B-Sides.

The opening lines to "Escape" were lifted from the Camille outtake, "Rebirth of the Flesh". These lines also kicked off the Lovesexy World Tour, before leading into "Erotic City".

Prince recorded a new version in 1991 called "Glam Slam '91" that later was the basis of "Gett Off" from Diamonds and Pearls.

== Glam Slam nightclubs ==
In late 1989, Prince and Gilbert Davison (Prince's former manager and president of Paisley Park Records) opened a nightclub in Minneapolis named after the song and partially decorated with paintings by Brian Canfield Mitchell. After eight years of frustration vis-a-vis its more established rival First Avenue, he then sold his 10% stake in the club and Gilbert Davison renamed it The Quest. The club became one of the premier nightspots in the Twin Cities, rivaling First Avenue as a live music venue, before closing in 2006 due to a fire in the club. The building was reconfigured following the closure and reopened as the nightclub Epic.

Other Glam Slam clubs opened in Miami (Glam Slam East), Los Angeles (Glam Slam West), and Yokohama (Glam Slam Yokohama); all have since closed, or closed and reopened under new management not tied to Prince.

== Glam Slam Ulysses ==
The Glam Slam moniker was extended in 1993 with Prince's Glam Slam Ulysses, a combination of live performances and video loosely based on Homer's Odyssey.

== Critical reception ==
American magazine Cash Box complimented "Glam Slam" as "a very unique sounding, yet commercially promising tune." Jerry Smith from Music Week wrote, "His royal maestro delivers this tasty gem from his number one-selling Lovesexy album and, although a slow, sinuous track, it's captivatingly insidious nature should ensure another success in time for his British dates."

== Track listing ==
- 7" single / Cassette single
1. "Glam Slam" (edit) – 3:28
2. "Escape" (edit) – 3:31
- 12" single
1. "Glam Slam" (remix) – 8:52 (remixed by Shep Pettibone and Steve Peck)
2. "Escape (Free Your Mind From This Rat Race)" – 6:26
- Mini CD single
1. "Glam Slam" (edit) – 3:32
2. "Escape" (edit) – 3:34
3. "Glam Slam" (remix) – 8:53 (remixed by Shep Pettibone and Steve Peck)

== Personnel ==
Credits from Benoît Clerc and Guitarcloud

- Prince – lead and backing vocals, electric and acoustic guitars, Roland D-50, synthesizers, bass guitar, drums, Dynacord ADD-One, Linn LM-1, percussion
- Cat Glover – backing vocals

== Charts ==
Weekly chart performance for "Glam Slam"
Chart (1988)	Peak position
Australia (Kent Music Report)	76
Belgium (Ultratop 50 Flanders)	17
Denmark (IFPI)	7
Finland (Suomen virallinen lista)	20
Italy (Musica e Dischi)	15
Italy Airplay (Music & Media)	9
Luxembourg (Radio Luxembourg)	14
Netherlands (Dutch Top 40)	15
Netherlands (Single Top 100)	9
New Zealand (Recorded Music NZ)	12
UK Singles (Official Charts)	29
West Germany (GfK)	33
