= I Wish U Heaven =

- US 7" single

Single by Prince

from the album Lovesexy
- B-side: "Scarlet Pussy"
- Released: September 20, 1988
- Recorded: January 31, 1988
- Studio: Paisley Park, Chanhassen, Minnesota, US
- Genre: Rock; pop; dance; gospel
- Length: 2:43 (album/7" edit); 10:13 (12" parts 1, 2 and 3) (Label "10:09")
- Label: Paisley Park, Warner Bros.
- Songwriter: Prince
- Producer: Prince

Prince singles chronology
| "Glam Slam" (1988) | "I Wish U Heaven" (1988) | "Erotic City" (1989) |

"I Wish U Heaven" is a song by Prince, and the third single from his 1988 album, Lovesexy. The 12" single is a substantially extended three-part suite which runs over ten minutes. This song was a replacement for "The Line", an upbeat jam featuring Boni Boyer and Sheila E. on backing vocals.

The B-side, "Scarlet Pussy", is credited to Prince's alter ego, Camille. The song is very sexual, using metaphors of cats and dogs for sexual organs, a theme Prince previously used for the B-side "La, La, La, He, He, Hee". Prince uses his sped-up Camille vocals, as well as a slowed-down vocal, similar to "Bob George" from The Black Album. The song features a saxophone solo from Eric Leeds. The decision to include such a raunchy song with the spiritual A-side was noteworthy. The edit of "Scarlet Pussy" was included on 1993's The Hits/The B-Sides.

== Composition ==
=== 12 Inch single version ===
Part One of the mix starts with a stripped-down version of the Lovesexy track, remixed with a dance beat. The original drum programming and rhythm guitar riffs are deleted for much of the song.

Part Two is a gospel rendition with new lyrics, continuing the spiritual theme. This part of the song was often sung in concert during the Lovesexy World Tour. The beginning of this section paraphrases lyrics from "Housequake", from the previous album Sign "☮" the Times. Prince also quotes the film Scarface with the lines "Say hello to my little friend..." and then introduces the "Blue Angel", a new blue version of his custom "White Cloud" guitar featured in the film Purple Rain. Sheila E. is also given a call out, and her voice can be heard responding in this section.

Part Three is based on an outtake called "Take This Beat" and deviates quite a bit from the original theme. This segment has Prince using his "Jamie Starr" persona to humorously tout the fact that he's funky, musically talented, and has plenty of beats (songs) that are "so fine". The song ends with a looped repeat of the title. This version of the song became one of the highlights during the supporting tour in which Prince would usually order the house lights to be turned up, and instruct the crowd during a call and response segment.

== Reception ==
Cashbox called Prince's performance "heavenly".

== Track listing ==
7" single / Cassette single

1. "I Wish U Heaven" (LP version) – 2:43
2. "Scarlet Pussy" (edit) – 4:10

12" single / CD single

1. "I Wish U Heaven (Part 1, 2 & 3)" – 10:13
2. "Scarlet Pussy" – 6:09

== Personnel ==
Credits from Benoît Clerc and Guitarcloud

- Prince – lead and backing vocals, electric and acoustic guitars, Fairlight CMI, synthesizers, bass guitar, Dynacord ADD-One, Linn LM-1

== Charts ==
=== Weekly charts ===
Chart performance for "I Wish U Heaven"
| Chart (1988-1989) | Peak position |
|---|---|
| Belgium (Ultratop 50 Flanders) | 26 |
| Germany (GfK) | 53 |
| Italy Airplay (Music & Media) | 8 |
| Luxembourg (Radio Luxembourg) | 17 |
| Netherlands (Single Top 100) | 20 |
| New Zealand (Recorded Music NZ) | 24 |
| UK Singles (OCC) | 24 |
