= Sign o' the Times (song) =

- US 7-inch single sleeve

Single by Prince

from the album Sign o' the Times
- B-side: "La, La, La, He, He, Hee"
- Released: February 18, 1987
- Recorded: July 15, 1986
- Studio: Sunset Sound (Hollywood, Los Angeles)
- Genre: Funk; minimalist
- Length: 3:44 (7-inch version); 5:02 (12-inch/album version)
- Label: Paisley Park; Warner Bros.
- Songwriter: Prince
- Producer: Prince

Prince singles chronology
| "Anotherlover-holenyohead" (1986) | "Sign o' the Times" (1987) | "If I Was Your Girlfriend" (1987) |

"Sign o' the Times" (stylized as "Sign "☮︎" the Times") is a song from the American musician Prince's 1987 album of the same name, released as a single on February 18, 1987. The song was intended for two separate Prince studio albums meant to be released in 1986, both shelved: Dream Factory and Crystal Ball. Prince performed all vocals and instruments on the song.

The song proved popular upon release, topping the R&B chart, and reaching number three on the Billboard Hot 100 and number 10 on the UK Singles Chart. In 2010, Rolling Stone ranked "Sign o' the Times" at number 304 on their list of the 500 Greatest Songs of All Time. By July 1987, it sold 200,000 copies in the United States. In 1987, Village Voice's Pazz & Jop critics' poll named "Sign o' the Times" the best single of the year, Prince's second recognition in this category. The song is also included in The Rock and Roll Hall of Fame's 500 Songs that Shaped Rock and Roll. Cat Glover is pictured on the single hiding her face behind a black heart.

== Composition and arrangement ==
The song was constructed by Prince almost entirely on the Fairlight CMI sampling synthesizer, which provides the primary keyboard riff and sampled electronic bass sounds heard on the track. All of the Fairlight sounds used on the song are factory presets, including the famed "orchestra hit" towards the end of the composition. The single marked a stark shift from Prince's prior albums, with a sparse electronic arrangement and a blues- and funk-influenced lead guitar part (cut from the single edit of the song). The lyrics are more similarly downcast than any of Prince's previous singles, addressing socio-political problems, including HIV/AIDS, gang violence, natural disasters, poverty, the crack epidemic, the Space Shuttle Challenger disaster, the Strategic Defense Initiative, and the threat of nuclear war.

== Artwork ==
The single's cover features new band member Cat Glover posing with a large heart covering her face; on the back cover, she is seen posing with Prince's guitar. A popular rumor insisted that the front cover showed Prince in drag. All photo images for "Sign o' the Times", including tour book, were photographed by Jeff Katz.

== Music video ==
The music video for "Sign o' the Times" was produced by Jae Flora-Katz, of Flora Films, and supervised at Warner Bros Records by Susan Silverman. This duo picked the director, Bill Konersman, based on his graphic design background. The text animation is considered one of the earliest instances of a lyric video.

== Track listings ==
- 7" single

A. "Sign o' the Times" (edit) – 3:42
B. "La, La, La, He, He, Hee" – 3:21

- 12" single

A. "Sign o' the Times" (LP version) – 4:57
B. "La, La, La, He, He, Hee" (Highly Explosive) – 10:32

== Personnel ==
Credits from Duane Tudahl, Benoît Clerc and Guitarcloud

- Prince – lead and backing vocals, Fairlight CMI, electric guitar, LinnDrum

== B-side ==
"La, La, La, He, He, Hee" depicts a chase between a cat and a dog and contains a CMI snare drum sample which sounds like a dog's bark. It features Sheila E. on vocals and percussion and Eric Leeds and Atlanta Bliss on saxophone and trumpet. The song's edit is featured on The Hits/The B-Sides (1993). Per the liner notes of The Hits/The B-Sides, Sheena Easton dared Prince to write a song with the lyrics "la, la, la, he, he, hee', which resulted in a shared writing credit.

== Charts ==
=== Weekly charts ===
1987 weekly chart performance for "Sign o' the Times"
| Chart (1987) | Peak position |
|---|---|
| Australia (Kent Music Report) | 29 |
| Austria (Ö3 Austria Top 40) | 20 |
| Belgium (Ultratop 50 Flanders) | 8 |
| Canada Top Singles (RPM) | 10 |
| Denmark (IFPI) | 1 |
| Europe (Eurochart Hot 100 Singles) | 7 |
| European Airplay Top 50 (Music & Media) | 5 |
| Finland (Suomen virallinen lista) | 9 |
| Italy (Musica e dischi) | 11 |
| Italy Airplay (Music & Media) | 9 |
| Luxembourg (Radio Luxembourg) | 6 |
| Netherlands (Dutch Top 40) | 6 |
| Netherlands (Single Top 100) | 7 |
| New Zealand (RIANZ) | 4 |
| Norway (VG-lista) | 7 |
| Sweden (Topplistan) | 14 |
| Switzerland (Schweizer Hitparade) | 11 |
| UK Singles (Official Charts) | 10 |
| US Billboard Hot 100 | 3 |
| US Hot Black Singles (Billboard) | 1 |
| West Germany (Media Control) | 35 |

2016 weekly chart performance for "Sign o' the Times"
| Chart (2016) | Peak position |
|---|---|
| France (SNEP) | 15 |

=== Year-end charts ===
Year-end chart performance for "Sign o' the Times"
| Chart (1987) | Position |
|---|---|
| Belgium (Ultratop) | 67 |
| Canada Top Singles (RPM) | 82 |
| Netherlands (Dutch Top 40) | 43 |
| Netherlands (Single Top 100) | 48 |
| New Zealand (RIANZ) | 37 |
| US Billboard Hot 100 | 60 |
| US Crossover Singles (Billboard) | 14 |
| US Hot Black Singles (Billboard) | 35 |
