= The Black Album (Prince album) =

Studio album by Prince
- Released: November 22, 1994
- Recorded: 1986–1987
- Studios: Paisley Park, Chanhassen
- Genre: Funk
- Length: 44:43
- Labels: Warner Bros. 25677 (original pressing); 45793 (second pressing)
- Producer: Prince

Prince chronology
Come (1994)	The Black Album (1994)	The Versace Experience: Prelude 2 Gold (1995)

The untitled sixteenth studio album by American recording artist Prince, referred to as The Black Album, was scheduled for release in December 1987 but was canceled at Prince's request after promotional copies had been issued. The follow-up to Sign o' the Times, the album was to appear in an entirely black sleeve with no title nor even a credit to Prince; hence it being referred to as The Black Album. Dubbed The Funk Bible by preceding press releases and in the opening track, the work seemed to be a reaction to criticism that Prince had become too pop-oriented. The album was his attempt to regain his black audience.

The 1987 promotional release had no printed title, artist name, production credits or photography printed; a simple black sleeve accompanied the disc. On promotional copies, only a song listing and catalog number 9 25677-1 were printed on the disc itself. The commercial version was to only have the catalog number printed in pink on the spine. The original compact disc pressing was made by Sony DADC rather than WEA Manufacturing.

After Prince became convinced that the album was "evil", he ordered it to be withdrawn a week before its release date. It was replaced with the album Lovesexy, a brighter pop-oriented album with elements of religious affirmation.

The album was officially released on November 22, 1994, by Warner Bros. Records.

== Music ==
Prince invoked Camille, the alter-ego behind his unreleased 1986 album Camille, as the guiding force responsible for The Black Album.

The opening track also mentioned the title of the album as being The Funk Bible, which was a consideration during work on this project. The title refers both to the album's all-black cover design and to Prince's attempt to earn back his credibility among the black pop audience.

The album features one of the most atypical Prince songs: "Bob George", in which he assumes the identity of a profane man who suspects his girlfriend to have had an affair with a man named Bob. He asks her what the man does for a living and learns that Bob manages Prince, whom he dismisses as "that skinny motherfucker with the high voice". The gun-wielding alter ego then fires a multitude of gunshots, and ends up being raided by the police. During live performances of the song during the Lovesexy Tour, he ends up being shot. The name for the track was a combination of Bob Cavallo (former manager), and Nelson George, a critic who was felt to have become very critical of Prince. "Bob George" features a growling monologue that is pitched down (using a Publison) to the point of being almost unrecognizable as Prince. The voice at the end of the song that says "bizarre" is actually a stock sound from the Fairlight CMI IIx library, with its pitch raised, the sample being lifted from the spoken-word track “Our Bizarre Relationship” on The Mothers of Invention's 1969 Uncle Meat album.

The Black Album features songs such as the hip hop parody "Dead on It", which playfully makes the accusation that all rappers are tone-deaf and unable to sing, and the playful "Cindy C.", which refers to supermodel Cindy Crawford. The rhyme at the end of the song was originally written by Steve "Silk" Hurley and was included on a song titled "Music Is the Key", which was previously released by Chicago house-music group JM Silk, of which Hurley was the founder. Hurley would later go on to remix two of the songs from the "Gett Off" maxi-single, the Housestyle and Flutestramental versions.

The album contains several instances of the portrayal of characters, using either a sped-up or slowed-down vocal track by Prince (as on "If I Was Your Girlfriend", "U Got the Look", "Strange Relationship", and "Housequake", all from the Sign o' the Times album).

The instrumental jazz-funk jam "2 Nigs United 4 West Compton" was revisited as a live song on the One Nite Alone... Live! album, but it was hardly the same track.

"Rockhard in a Funky Place" was originally considered for inclusion on the Camille project and then the planned Crystal Ball album. After the album's fade out, dissonant feedback fades in, followed by Prince saying "What kind of fuck ending was that?" before fading out again. "When 2 R in Love" is the only ballad on the album, and reappeared on Lovesexy, which was released the next year.

Prince performed "Bob George", parts of "When 2 R in Love", and "Superfunkycalifragisexy" on his Lovesexy Tour. "When 2 R in Love" was usually part of the piano medley in Act II, whereas the other two songs were part of the Act I segment, where Prince's evil side showed through (coinciding with the idea that The Black Album was evil). Act II was his "born-again" segment, with more upbeat spiritual songs, highlighting most of the Lovesexy songs, and top 40 hits.

Samples of "Bob George" would later show up on the "Dub Beats" official promo mix of Madonna's 1989 single "Like a Prayer".

== Withdrawal ==
Days before its intended December 1987 release, Prince contacted Warner Bros. chairman Mo Ostin and requested the album's withdrawal. Prince attributed his decision to a "spiritual epiphany" that convinced him the record represented the "anger" and "licentiousness" that the singer had to leave behind. He later blamed the album on an entity named Spooky Electric, described as a demonic, low-voiced alter-ego induced by Camille. The withdrawal decision is rumored to have been influenced by Prince's having a bad experience on MDMA. The record company had to destroy about 500,000 copies of the album which were already on loading docks, ready for shipment to stores. However, a small number of those copies escaped destruction, which made the album available on the bootleg market following its cancellation. Prince would later reference the withdrawal in the music video for the lead single from Lovesexy, "Alphabet St.", where a message quickly scrolls down the screen that reads: "Don't buy The Black Album, I'm sorry."

In April 2016, an original promo copy from 1987 was sold on Discogs' marketplace for a then-record of US$15,000.00. In 2017, five copies were discovered in the United States, with one of those selling for US$42,298. In June 2018, another copy of the original album was found in Canada—this copy later sold on the Discogs marketplace for $25,000.

== Legal release ==
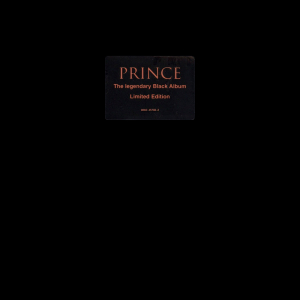
The 1994 release added a sticker to the outer packaging identifying the release as the legendary Black Album. (European pressing sticker)

The Black Album was finally released by Warner Bros. Records on November 22, 1994—again, containing only a track listing and the new catalog number 45793 printed onto the disc itself, and a copyright date of 1994 (with the exception of "When 2 R in Love", which was released in 1988 on Lovesexy). The sole explicit identifier was a sticker placed on the front case. Although it was released in a strictly limited edition and was deleted on January 27, 1995, the album was re-released exclusively to Tidal in 2016.

In the week of the album's official release, Warner ran an ad at the back of the November 26, 1994, issue of Billboard that offered owners of counterfeit copies a free copy of the legal release, provided they mail their bootleg copy to the label in exchange. This offer was given only to the first 1,000 individuals who sent in their copies.

== Reception ==
Professional ratings
Review scores
Source	Rating
AllMusic	4/5 stars
Blender	4/5 stars
Entertainment Weekly	B
Knoxville News Sentinel	3/5 stars
MusicHound Rock	2.5/5
Q	4/5 stars
The Rolling Stone Album Guide	3.5/5 stars
Select	1/5
Tom Hull	B
The Village Voice	A−

Reactions to the 1987 promo release were largely positive. Several celebrities, including U2's The Edge and Bono, cited it as one of their favorite albums of 1988 in a Rolling Stone magazine poll. Robert Christgau, writing in The Village Voice, compared Prince's approach to George Clinton's "sonic wallop and communal craziness", adding that "the bassy murk never lets up, and at its weirdest [...] it's as dark as Cosmic Slop." Commenting on the scarcity of advance-release copies, he recommended that "those who pine for heavy funk should nag their local dealers". The New York Times' Jon Pareles remarked that both The Black Album and Lovesexy "show a musician experimenting like mad with every musical parameter, and so prolific that he has to cut back his output so he won't be competing with himself". He observed that The Black Album "answers the Beatles' eclectic White Album with Prince's own tour of black music styles (from a skeletal, synthesized blues to a rap, with extended stops at James Brown, Sly and the Family Stone and Parliament-Funkadelic); it has black humor and nasty fantasies."

Retrospective reviews since the album's limited official release have been more mixed. In one of the few unambiguously negative appraisals, Select's Matt Hall panned the album as "the sound of someone losing step with the times", and was particularly critical of Prince's "embarrassing, bitter rant against hip hop" on "Dead on It". David Browne of Entertainment Weekly believed that The Black Album had not aged well by 1994, writing that "[i]n the pre-gangsta days of 1987, The Black Album was jarring, but now that our ears have become jaded — at times liberated — it sounds downright average", but offered praise for the "spooky, scary, and funny, sometimes all at once" "Bob George". More sympathetically, Stephen Thomas Erlewine of AllMusic opined that the album "isn't a lost masterwork — it's fun, but not much more". He criticized "When 2 R in Love" as "nondescript" and "Dead on It" as "one of the lamest things he ever waxed", but declared that "[t]he rest of the eight-song album is brilliant, pure funk" and "a terrific little record that still delights, even after its mystique has faded".

== Track listing ==
All tracks are written by Prince, except where noted.

Side one
No.	Title	Writer(s)	Length
1.	"Le Grind"		6:44
2.	"Cindy C."	Prince, Steve Hurley (uncredited)	6:15
3.	"Dead on It"		4:37
4.	"When 2 R in Love"		3:59
Total length:			21:35

Side two
No.	Title	Writer(s)	Length
5.	"Bob George"		5:36
6.	"Superfunkycalifragisexy"		5:55
7.	"2 Nigs United 4 West Compton"		7:01
8.	"Rockhard in a Funky Place"	Prince, Eric Leeds	4:31
Total length:			23:03

== Personnel ==
Adapted from Benoît Clerc, Duane Tudahl, and Guitarcloud

=== Musicians ===
- Prince – lead vocals (tracks 1–4, 6, 8), rapping (track 6), spoken word (tracks 2, 5, 7), backing vocals (tracks 1–4, 6, 8), electric guitar (tracks 1–3, 5–6, 8), bass (tracks 1–3, 6–8), Fairlight CMI (tracks 1–3, 5–6, 8), synthesizers (all tracks), E-mu Emax (track 4), Ensoniq Mirage (track 5), Sequential Prophet VS (tracks 5, 8), Yamaha DX7 (tracks 4, 5), Publison IM90 Infernal Machine (track 5), Hammond organ (track 7), drums (tracks 1–2, 5–6, 8), percussion (tracks 2, 6, 8), claps (tracks 2, 8), programming (tracks 1–6)
- Atlanta Bliss – trumpet (tracks 1–2, 7–8)
- Boni Boyer – backing vocals (tracks 1–2), claps (track 2)
- Sheila E. – backing vocals (tracks 1–2), percussion (track 2), claps (track 2), sampled line from "Holly Rock" (track 3)
- Jill Jones – backing vocals (tracks 1–2), claps (track 2)
- Eric Leeds – saxophone (tracks 1–2, 7–8), flute (track 8)
- Susannah Melvoin – backing vocals (tracks 1–2, 8), claps (tracks 2, 8)
- Cat Glover – rap (track 2), spoken vocals (track 7)

=== Technical ===
- Prince – producer
- Susan Rogers – recording engineer

== Charts ==
Chart performance for The Black Album
Chart (1994)	Peak position
Australian Albums (ARIA)	15
Austrian Albums (Ö3 Austria)	7
Dutch Albums (Album Top 100)	35
German Albums (Offizielle Top 100)	49
Swiss Albums (Schweizer Hitparade)	8
UK Albums (Official Charts)	36
US Billboard 200	47
US Top R&B/Hip-Hop Albums (Billboard)	18
