= Kohiruimaki =

Kohiruimaki (written: 小比類巻) is a Japanese surname. Notable people with the surname include:

- Kahoru Kohiruimaki (小比類巻 かほる, born 1967), Japanese singer
- Taishin Kohiruimaki (小比類巻 太信, born 1977), Japanese kickboxer and karateka
