= Lloyd Powell =

English pianist (1888–1975)

Lloyd Powell (22 August 1888 – 25 March 1975) was an English, later Canadian pianist and teacher.

== Career ==
Lloyd Ioan Powell was born in Ironbridge, Shropshire in 1888. His parents were Welsh. He studied at the Royal College of Music (RCM) in London from the age of 10. His teachers were Marmaduke Barton (piano; a student of Bernhard Stavenhagen), Sir Charles Villiers Stanford (composition) and Sir Frederick Bridge (counterpoint). He won the Hopkinson Gold Medal for piano performance and the Dannreuther Prize for the best piano concerto performance. Further studies were undertaken with Ferruccio Busoni in Basel, and in Berlin.

Powell toured in Paris, Berlin, England and Scotland, and spent many years as an Examiner for the Associated Board of the Royal Schools of Music, visiting places such as Australia, South Africa, Canada, New Zealand, Ceylon, the West Indies and Java.

He became a Professor of Pianoforte at the RCM in 1919. His students at the RCM included the blind pianist Alec Templeton; and Isador Goodman, in whom Powell instilled the idea that to be a good pianist, one must also teach the piano. Goodman took over Powell's teaching duties there when the latter was examining in Canada, and later became a teacher at the Sydney Conservatorium of Music for 50 years.

Before 1922 Lloyd Powell had given one of the earliest performances of John Ireland's Piano Sonata. In 1927, Thomas Dunhill, a friend of Powell's, dedicated his 4 Pieces for Piano, Op. 69, to him.

Having examined in Canada for many years, he moved to Toronto in 1951, and settled in Vancouver in 1954. He appeared throughout the country in recitals, made broadcasts on the Canadian Broadcasting Corporation, taught privately, gave lectures, and adjudicated at music competitions. He played the complete piano works of Charles Ives and the 32 sonatas of Ludwig van Beethoven in series of recitals at the University of British Columbia. In 1961 he appeared on Canadian television in Directions in Music. He performed for Jeunesses Musicales Canada in 1966–67.

Lloyd Powell died in Vancouver in 1975, aged 86.
