= Good Question =

American band

Good Question are an R&B and dance music vocal duo from Philadelphia, Pennsylvania, that was composed of brothers Sean and Marc Douglas. Their only chart hit came in 1988, when they hit number one on the Hot Dance Music/Club Play chart with "Got a New Love". The song also reached the R&B and pop charts in the U.S., where it peaked at numbers 51 and 86, respectively. "Got a New Love" was also the 85th-best-performing single on the Tokio Hot 100.

Another single, "Listen to Your Heart", and its self-titled album were released the same year on Prince's record label Paisley Park Records.

They have since re-grouped and currently perform in the Dallas/Fort Worth area.

== Discography ==
- 1988: Good Question (Paisley Park Records)

== See also ==
- List of number-one dance hits (United States)
- List of artists who reached number one on the U.S. dance chart
