= Lovesexy =

Studio album by Prince
- Released: May 10, 1988
- Recorded: October 1987 ("When 2 R in Love"); December 11, 1987 – January 31, 1988
- Studios: Paisley Park, Chanhassen
- Genres: Pop; R&B; funk
- Length: 45:03
- Labels: Paisley Park; Warner Bros.
- Producer: Prince

Prince chronology
Sign o' the Times (1987)	Lovesexy (1988)	Batman (1989)

Singles from Lovesexy
- 1. "Alphabet St." Released: April 1988; 2. "Glam Slam" Released: July 11, 1988; 3. "I Wish U Heaven" Released: September 20, 1988

Lovesexy is the tenth studio album by American recording artist Prince. It was released on May 10, 1988, by Paisley Park and Warner Bros. Records. The album was recorded in just seven weeks, from mid-December 1987 to late January 1988, at Prince's new Paisley Park Studios, after the cancellation of the infamous Black Album and most of the album is a solo effort from Prince, with a few exceptions. The lyrical themes of the record include positivity, self-improvement, spirituality, and God.

Despite being critically acclaimed, Lovesexy became Prince's first album since 1981's Controversy that didn't crack the top 10, instead reaching number 11 on the Billboard 200. However, it did reach number one in the Netherlands, New Zealand, Sweden, Switzerland, and the UK. It spawned three singles: "Alphabet St."—which became a worldwide top-10 hit in the spring of 1988—and the follow-up singles "Glam Slam" and "I Wish U Heaven", the latter both of which failed to reach the Billboard Hot 100. Subsequently, it was Prince's least successful album in the United States since 1980. It was certified Gold by the Recording Industry Association of America (RIAA) in December 1988.

Lovesexy was accompanied by the Lovesexy Tour, of which the September 9th Dortmund show in Germany was released on video cassette and LaserDisc. The tour was also televised (with a short delay for editorial purposes) on several European channels, with the broadcast containing various alternate camera shots in place of the ones used in the officially released video, which was released in 1989.

== Recording ==
The opening track, "Eye No" (stylized No), was recorded with the full band (Miko Weaver on guitar, Levi Seacer, Jr. on bass, Doctor Fink and Boni Boyer on keyboards, Eric Leeds on saxophone, Atlanta Bliss on trumpet and Sheila E. on drums). Sheila E., in fact, plays drums on several tracks and sings backup, along with Boyer. Leeds and Bliss provide horns on most tracks, and Ingrid Chavez provides the intro to " No". The album is designed to be heard in the context of a continuous sequence: LP pressings split the album in two side-long tracks, without visual bands to indicate individual songs. Similarly, early CD copies of Lovesexy have the entire album in sequence as a single track, though some later editions have it as nine separate tracks. Lovesexy is also the first Prince album to replace the pronoun "I" with a stylized "" symbol, commonly Romanized as "eye" (i.e. "Eye No"), in both song titles and liner notes; the symbol would not be completely adopted, however, until 1992's Love Symbol Album.

== Music ==
The theme of the album is the struggle between good and evil. God and Satan, virtue and sin (although, with the Gemini character that he developed in 1989, these "sides" may also represent "ego and alter-ego"), the perennial themes of Prince's work, mix as Prince climaxes to "Love is God, God is love, girls and boys love God above" in the song "Anna Stesia".

Prince referred to Lovesexy as a gospel album. It opens with a sermon of sorts; "Eye No", a positive energetic track advising people to be free from their vices and to reject Satan, and affirming his belief in God, while using his bully pulpit to encourage the listener to do the same. "Eye No" is a reworking of a song called "The Ball" from the unreleased Crystal Ball. The song ends with a scale of horns and a segue of conversations (originally recorded on "Eye No"'s original version "The Ball" which segued into another song; the "conversations", or background party ambiance, was later used on the Graffiti Bridge album as a segue between "We Can Funk" and "Joy in Repetition") leading to the album's biggest-selling single, "Alphabet St.", which mixes dance music, rock and rap along with playful lyrics about sex, braggadocio, and the heavenly state of feeling "lovesexy". Next is "Glam Slam", a busy dance track which features Prince's full band. It speaks to the uplifting interlude between Prince and a woman, and how, when he fell down, she lifted him. It also praises the woman's love and sense of humanity. The song ends with an almost classical music string solo (performed on keyboard). Ending side one of the vinyl release is "Anna Stesia", a heartfelt confessional number divulging various sins of the flesh, and ends with Prince promising to dedicate his life and music to God.

Side two opens with the machine gun-like pace of "Dance On", which lambastes negative aspects of society, somewhat akin to "Sign O' the Times". The title track follows, described by Prince as "The feeling you get when you fall in love ... not with a boy or girl but with the heavens above," and it is another energetic dance track; the "Good News" indeed Prince extols its virtues graphically and then he and Cat Glover share an orgasm, both using sped-up Camille-like vocals, going from Cat's voice to Prince's. This leads into "When 2 R in Love", a sex-infused ballad recorded during the sessions for the untitled black album. Next is the almost sparse, but uplifting "I Wish U Heaven", which says that no matter what controversy or opposition one may bring, the result is still wishing your enemy the best. It follows a Biblical proverb about "blessing those that curse you, loving those that hate you, for it heaps hot coals on their heads". The last track is "Positivity", which echoes the theme of "Dance On". It extols the virtues of staying positive, while asking the listener to examine examples of negativity and negative aspects of the world; overlooking the quick thrill and pushing toward being positive throughout it. The song continuously asks the question "Have you had your plus sign today?" The vocals are sung, but the bridge and extended portions are more of a spoken rap-type style that Prince had started to display as early as "Annie Christian" in 1981. The song ends with sounds of water rushing and a river over keyboard chords. This final song was later given to Mavis Staples for her 1991 album, The Voice.

== Critical reception ==
Professional ratings
Review scores
Source	Rating
AllMusic	3.5/5 stars
Blender	3/5 stars
Chicago Sun-Times	3.5/4 stars
Entertainment Weekly	B
The Guardian	5/5 stars
Los Angeles Times	4/4 stars
Mojo	4/5 stars
NME	8/10
Rolling Stone	4/5 stars
The Village Voice	B+

The cover (based on a photo by Jean Baptiste Mondino) caused some controversy upon release as it depicts Prince in the nude. Some record stores refused to stock it or wrapped the album in black, although Lovesexy had been issued as a replacement for the hastily withdrawn The Black Album, which had an achromatic black cover.

Lovesexy was Prince's least successful album since 1981, failing to break the top 10, being certified Gold and spending just 21 weeks on the US Billboard 200. While "Alphabet St." managed to crack the top 10, it did not make a lasting impression and the subsequent two single releases failed to chart on the Hot 100.

The situation in the United Kingdom was more positive, where the album debuted at number 1 (Prince's first number-one album in the UK) and all the singles became top 40 hits. In addition, the Lovesexy Tour (which concluded in February 1989) was a massive success across Europe and Japan.

== Track listing ==
All tracks are written by Prince.

Lovesexy track listing
No.	Title	Length
1.	" No"	5:47
2.	"Alphabet St."	5:38
3.	"Glam Slam"	5:04
4.	"Anna Stesia"	4:56
5.	"Dance On"	3:44
6.	"Lovesexy"	5:48
7.	"When 2 R in Love"	4:01
8.	"I Wish U Heaven"	2:43
9.	"Positivity"	7:15
Total length:		45:03

Sample credits

- The opening to "Eye No" contains a sample from a Roger Limb track "Passing Clouds", created at the BBC Radiophonic Workshop released in 1971 on the Out of this World album.

Notes

- The "" in " No" is included in place of the pronoun "I" throughout the liner notes. It is commonly transliterated as "Eye" because of "I Wish U Heaven"'s placement later on the album.
- First pressings of the compact disc feature all content on a single track. Likewise, the vinyl edition presented each side of vinyl with no track indexes. Some later pressings of both CD and vinyl featured nine separate tracks. When Prince's music was added to digital stores and streaming services in 2017, Lovesexy was made available in its single track format only. However, a tracked version was later released digitally in 2021.

== Personnel ==
Information sourced from Benoît Clerc and Guitarcloud

- Prince (credited solely with "whatever" in the liner notes) – lead and backing vocals, electric and acoustic guitars, Yamaha KX88, Roland MKS-20, Ensoniq ESQ-1, E-mu Emax, Fairlight CMI, Roland D-50, Yamaha DX7, bass guitar, Dynacord Add-One, Linn LM-1, drums, percussion, Publison IM90 Infernal Machine
- Sheila E. – drums and percussion (1, 2, 4, 5, 9), backing vocals (5, 9)
- Boni Boyer – keyboards (1, 5), backing vocals (2, 4, 9)
- Dr. Fink – keyboards (1, 5)
- Miko Weaver – electric guitar (1, 5)
- Levi Seacer, Jr. – bass guitar (1, 5)
- Eric Leeds – saxophone (1, 2, 9)
- Atlanta Bliss – trumpet (1, 2, 9)
- Ingrid Chavez – spoken intro (1), spoken voice (2)
- Cat Glover – rap (2), backing vocals (2–4)

== Singles and Hot 100 chart placings ==
- "Alphabet St." (#8 US, #3 US R&B, #9 UK)
1. "Alphabet St. – part 1" – 7" version only
2. "Alphabet St. – part 2" – 7" version only
3. "Alphabet St." – 12" version only
4. "Alphabet St. – This is not music, this is a trip" – 12" version only
- "Glam Slam" (#44 US R&B, #29 UK)
1. "Glam Slam" – 7" version only
2. "Glam Slam (Remix)" – 12" version only
3. "Escape (Free yo mind from this rat race)"
- "I Wish U Heaven" (#18 US R&B, #24 UK)
1. "I Wish U Heaven" – 7" version only
2. "I Wish U Heaven (Part 1, 2 and 3)" – 12" version only
3. "Scarlet Pussy"

== Charts ==
=== Weekly charts ===
1988 weekly chart performance for Lovesexy
Chart (1988)	Peak position
Australian Albums (Australian Music Report)	8
Austrian Albums (Ö3 Austria)	3
Canada Top Albums/CDs (RPM)	7
Dutch Albums (Album Top 100)	1
European Albums (Music & Media)	1
Finnish Albums (Suomen virallinen lista)	4
French Albums (IFOP)	9
German Albums (Offizielle Top 100)	4
Italian Albums (Musica e dischi)	1
New Zealand Albums (RMNZ)	1
Norwegian Albums (VG-lista)	2
Spanish Albums (AFYVE)	17
Swedish Albums (Sverigetopplistan)	1
Swiss Albums (Schweizer Hitparade)	1
UK Albums (Official Charts)	1
US Billboard 200	11
US Top R&B/Hip-Hop Albums (Billboard)	5

2016 weekly chart performance for Lovesexy
Chart (2016)	Peak position
French Albums (SNEP)	146
Scottish Albums (Official Charts)	74
UK Albums (Official Charts)	75
US Top Catalog Albums (Billboard)	26

2023 weekly chart performance for Lovesexy
Chart (2023)	Peak position
Belgian Albums (Ultratop Wallonia)	141
Hungarian Physical Albums (MAHASZ)	25

=== Year-end charts ===
Year-end chart performance for Lovesexy
Chart (1988)	Position
Austrian Albums (Ö3 Austria)	10
Canada Top Albums/CDs (RPM)	48
Dutch Albums (Album Top 100)	12
European Albums (Music & Media)	10
German Albums (Offizielle Top 100)	26
Swiss Albums (Schweizer Hitparade)	23
UK Albums (Gallup)	59
US Billboard 200	100
US Top R&B/Hip-Hop Albums (Billboard)	53

== Certifications and sales ==
Certifications and sales for Lovesexy
Region	Certification	Certified units/sales
Austria (IFPI Austria)	Gold	25,000^{*}
France (SNEP)	2× Gold	200,000^{*}
Germany (BVMI)	Gold	250,000^{^}
Italy	—	170,000
Netherlands (NVPI)	Gold	50,000^{^}
Spain (Promusicae)	Gold	50,000^{^}
Switzerland (IFPI Switzerland)	Gold	25,000^{^}
Sweden (GLF)	Gold	50,000^{^}
United Kingdom (BPI)	Platinum	300,000^{^}
United States (RIAA)	Gold	500,000^{^}
Summaries
Worldwide	—	2,600,000
^{*} Sales figures based on certification alone.^{^} Shipments figures based on certification alone.
