= U Got the Look =

- US 7-inch single

Single by Prince

from the album Sign o' the Times
- B-side: "Housequake"
- Released: July 14, 1987
- Recorded: December 21, 1986
- Studio: Sunset Sound, Hollywood
- Genre: Funk; electro-funk; new wave; pop rock; R&B
- Length: 3:49 (album version); 6:45 (12-inch version)
- Label: Paisley Park; Warner Bros.
- Songwriter: Prince
- Producer: Prince

Prince singles chronology
"If I Was Your Girlfriend" (1987)	"U Got the Look" (1987)	"I Could Never Take the Place of Your Man" (1987)

"U Got the Look" is a song by American musician Prince. It opens the second disc of Prince's double album Sign o' the Times (1987), and became the album's second chart single.

The song includes vocals from Scottish singer Sheena Easton, and percussion from Sheila E., both of whom are credited on the album but not the single release. Prince uses his pseudonym Camille to list himself as an additional vocalist.

== Music video ==
The music video for the song featuring Easton was filmed in Paris, France, and was directed by the American David Hogan. It was choreographed by Cat Glover. It was included in the film Sign "☮" the Times, and features the intro from the extended version of the song. The video is portrayed to be a dream sequence by Prince, dozing off in his dressing room. In the United States, the single went to number 2 on the Billboard Hot 100 singles tally, the week of October 17, 1987.

== Track listings ==
7-inch: Paisley Park / 7-28289 (US)

1. "U Got the Look" – 3:46
2. "Housequake" (edit) – 3:24

12-inch: Paisley Park / 0-20727 (US)

1. "U Got the Look" (Long Look) – 6:45
2. "U Got the Look" (Single Cut) – 3:46
3. "Housequake" (Album Cut) – 4:38
4. "Housequake" (7 Minutes MoQuake) – 7:15

12-inch: Warner Bros. / W8289T (UK)

1. "U Got the Look" (Long Look) – 6:45
2. "Housequake" (7 Minutes MoQuake) – 7:15
3. "U Got the Look" (Single Cut) – 3:46

*Also available as a picture disc (W8289TP)

== Personnel ==
Credits from Duane Tudahl, Benoît Clerc and Guitarcloud

- Prince – vocals, Fairlight CMI, Prophet VS, electric guitar, Publison IM90 Infernal Machine
- Sheila E. – Linn LM-1, cymbals, hi-hat, cowbells, timbales
- Sheena Easton – vocals

== Charts ==
=== Weekly charts ===
Weekly chart performance for "U Got the Look"
Chart (1987–1988)	Peak position
Australia (Kent Music Report)	90
Austria (Ö3 Austria Top 40)	23
Belgium (Ultratop 50 Flanders)	14
Canada Top Singles (RPM)	17
Europe (European Hot 100 Singles)	14
Italy (Musica e dischi)	20
Italy Airplay (Music & Media)	13
Luxembourg (Radio Luxembourg)	8
Netherlands (Dutch Top 40)	17
Netherlands (Single Top 100)	11
New Zealand (Recorded Music NZ)	8
UK Singles (Official Charts)	11
US Billboard Hot 100	2
US Dance Singles Sales (Billboard)	18
US Hot R&B/Hip-Hop Songs (Billboard)	11
US Cash Box Top 100	3
West Germany (GfK)	61

2012 weekly chart performance for "U Got the Look"
Chart (2012)	Peak position
France (SNEP)	189

=== Year-end charts ===
Year-end chart performance for "U Got the Look"
Chart (1987)	Position
US Billboard Hot 100	39
US Hot Crossover Singles (Billboard)	19
US Cash Box Top 100	28

== Cover versions ==
"U Got The Look" was covered by Gary Numan on his 1992 LP "Machine And Soul".
