= Crystal Ball (unreleased album) =

Studio album by Prince
- Released: Unreleased
- Recorded: July 1984 ("Slow Love"); March–November 1986
- Genre: R&B; pop; rock; funk
- Length: 117:34
- Label: Paisley Park; Warner Bros.
- Producer: Prince

Crystal Ball is an unreleased studio album by Prince recorded throughout 1986. The album was planned to consist of 3 LPs and cover a broad range of musical styles. Many of its tracks were repurposed for the 1987 album Sign o' the Times, while others remained officially unreleased for years.

== Background ==
Crystal Ball can be traced to late 1985 with what would be Prince and the Revolution's final album, Dream Factory. Since Purple Rain's release, each successive album became more of a collaborative effort between Prince and band members Wendy & Lisa in addition to full band performances on certain songs. Dream Factory evolved quickly from a 9-track single album to a double-LP with an ever-changing track listing. A final configuration of the album was finally decided upon and the album was mastered. However, during 1986, Wendy & Lisa had increasingly become disgruntled with Prince's decision to expand the Revolution with non-musicians Wally Safford and Gregory Allen Brooks along with the attitude that these new members brought with them. Unhappy and outspoken about their feelings, they had to be convinced to remain with the band and go on tour for that year's Parade Tour. However, Prince himself felt slighted and by the end of the tour fired most of the Revolution. Thus, the album was never released. The versions of the songs that would get an official release years later had the contributions made by Wendy & Lisa either toned down or completely removed.

Once Prince abandoned the project, he began recording a new album. He first recorded a track, "Housequake", in a sped-up vocal style similar to the title track of Dream Factory. Pleased with the results, Prince continued to record in this style and ended up recording an entire album of songs in this new vocal style. Prince adopted the idea of releasing an album under the pseudonym Camille with no picture on the album cover to mystify the public and see if the album would stand on its own without Prince's name attached to it. The album reached the mastering stage, but as Prince continued recording songs, he felt the need to expand beyond a single album. Eventually he decided to combine various tracks from Dream Factory, Camille and other newly recorded tracks into a 3-LP album called Crystal Ball. Warner Bros. balked at the idea, convinced the album would not perform well as a three-album set, especially after the relatively poor sales for his previous release, Parade. Warner Bros. and Prince compromised and settled on a double album. Prince added a duet with Sheena Easton, but cut seven tracks. The set was renamed Sign o' the Times.

== Releases over time ==
Though seven tracks were cut from Crystal Ball, they have all been released in some form over the years. "Shockadelica" was the first to be publicly released as the B-side to "If I Was Your Girlfriend" in 1987. "Rockhard in a Funky Place" was slated to be the closing track on The Black Album which was shelved by Prince in late 1987 and heavily bootlegged by fans. It finally saw a limited official release in 1994. "The Ball" was reworked, given new lyrics and became "Eye No", the opening track to 1988's Lovesexy. Later in 1988, "Good Love" was released on the soundtrack to Bright Lights, Big City. Prince released "Joy in Repetition" on his Graffiti Bridge soundtrack in 1990 (and many critics hailed it as the best track on the album). In 1998, Prince revived the concept of Crystal Ball with the release of a 3-CD album of the same name. The title track was the same one from the original 3-LP version; however, the set had little to do with the original concept other than the title track, a slight edit of "Good Love" and the fact that it contained three discs. Finally in 2001, a live rehearsal of "Rebirth of the Flesh" recorded with the Sign o' the Times band was released on Prince's website; however, this version had profanity edited from the lyrics. The studio version has surfaced on the Super Deluxe Edition of Sign o' the Times released on September 25, 2020, along with much of the previously unreleased songs from the Dream Factory / Camille / Crystal Ball sessions.

== Track listing ==
Side 1
No.	Title	Other release(s)	Length
1.	"Rebirth of the Flesh"	Sign o' the Times – Super Deluxe Edition	5:29
2.	"Play in the Sunshine"	Sign o' the Times	5:05
3.	"Housequake"	Sign o' the Times	4:39
4.	"The Ballad of Dorothy Parker"	Sign o' the Times	4:03
Total length:			19:16

Side 2
No.	Title	Other release(s)	Length
5.	"It"	Sign o' the Times	5:09
6.	"Starfish and Coffee"	Sign o' the Times	2:50
7.	"Slow Love"	Sign o' the Times	4:22
8.	"Hot Thing"	Sign o' the Times	5:38
Total length:			18:01

Side 3
No.	Title	Other release(s)	Length
9.	"Crystal Ball"	Crystal Ball; Sign o' the Times – Super Deluxe Edition	10:27
10.	"If I Was Your Girlfriend"	Sign o' the Times	5:01
11.	"Rock Hard in a Funky Place"	The Black Album	4:34
Total length:			20:03

Side 4
No.	Title	Other release(s)	Length
12.	"The Ball"	Lovesexy (Renamed "Eye No"); Sign o' the Times – Super Deluxe Edition	4:34
13.	"Joy in Repetition"	Graffiti Bridge	5:04
14.	"Strange Relationship"	Sign o' the Times	4:01
15.	"I Could Never Take the Place of Your Man"	Sign o' the Times	6:28
Total length:			20:07

Side 5
No.	Title	Other release(s)	Length
16.	"Shockadelica"	B-side of "If I Was Your Girlfriend"; The Hits/The B-Sides	6:12
17.	"Good Love"	Bright Lights, Big City soundtrack Crystal Ball	5:12
18.	"Forever in My Life"	Sign o' the Times	3:31
19.	"Sign o' the Times"	Sign o' the Times	4:56
Total length:			19:53

Side 6
No.	Title	Other release(s)	Length
20.	"The Cross"	Sign o' the Times	4:46
21.	"It's Gonna Be a Beautiful Night"	Sign o' the Times	8:59
22.	"Adore (Until the End of Time)"	Sign o' the Times	6:29
Total length:			20:14

== See also ==
- Unreleased Prince projects
