= Erotic City =

- German CD single

Single by Prince and Sheila E.
- B-side: "I Would Die 4 U (Extended Version)"
- Released: 1989
- Recorded: March 25–April 4, 1984
- Studio: Sunset Sound, Hollywood, California
- Genre: R&B; synth-funk
- Length: 3:55 (original version); 7:24 (dance mix)
- Label: Paisley Park; Warner Bros.
- Songwriter: Prince
- Producer: Prince

Prince and Sheila E. singles chronology
"I Wish U Heaven" (1988)	"Erotic City" (1989)	"Batdance" (1989)

"Erotic City", subtitled "Make Love Not War Erotic City Come Alive", is a song by American musicians Prince and Sheila E., released as the B-side to the 1984 single "Let's Go Crazy" and the 12" version of the 1986 single "Girls & Boys". It was both written and produced by Prince. While delivering his speech before the induction of the Funk collective known as Parliament-Funkadelic into the Rock and Roll Hall of Fame in May 1997, Prince explained that "Erotic City" was recorded directly after seeing Parliament-Funkadelic at the Beverly Theatre in Los Angeles in 1983. It was re-released on CD on The Hits/The B-Sides in 1993. The song can be heard in the comedy film PCU and was included on its soundtrack in 1994, the song was performed by George Clinton and the Parliament Funkadelic. The song can be heard in the Spike Lee film Girl 6 and was included on its soundtrack in 1996. In 2022, Rolling Stone included "Erotic City" in their list of the "200 Greatest Dance Songs of All Time".

== Composition ==
The song starts with a guitar string plucked and whammied, then drops into the drum track (which sounds as if he may have reversed on the 4/8 like a computer). The experimental number relies on a strong bass line and a simple keyboard riff. The song features Prince's voice both sped up and slowed down at various times to sound like different singers. Also featured is Sheila E., in her recording debut (with Prince), who became a close associate with Prince and worked with him extensively over the years. Although the song was a B-side to a #1 hit, it received significant radio play.

== Releases ==
The dance mix of "Erotic City" was released as a 3" and 5" CD single in West Germany in 1989 and on June 29, 1990, respectively. The artwork for the single features the same image of Prince that was used for the cover of "I Would Die 4 U". The extended version of the latter was included as the B-side of "Erotic City". The song was released in two versions—the extended remix was released as the B-side to "Let's Go Crazy", while the edit (pitched nearly a key higher) was included on The Hits/The B-Sides.

== Controversy ==
The song was notable for its sexual references, and the use of the word "fuck" ("we can fuck until the dawn"), but some people, especially Sheila E. (who sings the chorus), have claimed the word is "funk", allowing it to be played on the radio in the late 1980s into the 1990s. However, the Federal Communications Commission has levied fines against stations that played the song for broadcasting allegedly indecent material, including KLUC-FM in Las Vegas, Nevada; KTFM in San Antonio, Texas; and KBZR in Phoenix, Arizona. As editing technology became more available since then, more radio stations utilized it to blank out or backmask the profanity before adding the song for throwback rotation.

== Legacy ==
In June 2020, Slant ranked "Erotic City" number 33 in its list of "The 100 Best Dance Songs of All Time". In July 2022, Rolling Stone ranked it number 135 in hits list of the "200 Greatest Dance Songs of All Time".

== Track listing ==
=== 1984 ===
- 7" Single: Warner Bros. Records 7-29216 (US, Canada & Australia)

A. "Let’s Go Crazy" (Edit) (3:46)
B. "Erotic City" (Edit) (3:53)

- 12" Single: Warner Bros. Records 0-20246 (US, Canada & Australia)

A. "Let’s Go Crazy" (Special Dance Mix) (7:35)
B. "Erotic City (Make Love Not War Erotic City Come Alive)" (7:24)

- 12" Single: Warner Bros. Records W2000T (UK)

A1. "Let’s Go Crazy" (Special Dance Mix) (7:35)
A2. "Take Me with U" (3:51)
B. "Erotic City (Make Love Not War Erotic City Come Alive)" (7:24)

- 12" Promo: Warner Bros. Records SAM 217 (UK)

A. "The Erotic City" (Full Length Version) (7:24) (credited to Prince and the Revolution with Sheila E.)
B. "I Feel for You" (7:12) - Chaka Khan

=== 1986 ===
- 12" Single: Warner Bros. Records W8586T/920 532-0 (UK & Europe)

A1. "Girls & Boys" (LP Version) (5:30)
A2 "Under the Cherry Moon" (2:57)
B. "Erotic City" ("Make Love Not War Erotic City Come Alive") (7:24)

=== 1989 Reissue ===
- CD maxi-single: Paisley Park/Warner Bros. Records 21185 (West Germany)
1. "Erotic City" (Dance Mix) – 7:24
2. "I Would Die 4 U" (extended version) – 10:15

Note: Also available as a 3" Mini CD

== Personnel ==
Credits sourced from Duane Tudahl, Benoît Clerc, and Guitarcloud

- Prince – lead and backing vocals, electric and acoustic guitars, Oberheim OB-8, bass guitar, LinnDrum
- Sheila E. – lead and backing vocals

== George Clinton and Parliament-Funkadelic Version ==
The song was recorded and released in 1994 by George Clinton and Parliament-Funkadelic both as a single and as part of the soundtrack album for the motion picture PCU.
