= Madhouse (band) =

American jazz fusion band

Madhouse was an American jazz fusion band from Minneapolis, Minnesota, United States, created by Prince. Two Madhouse albums (and several singles) were officially released, both in 1987.

== History ==
Prince had considered the idea of an instrumental jazz–funk album ever since he recorded his first tracks with Eric Leeds for his 1985 side-project, The Family. In late 1985–early 1986, he recorded hours of instrumental music with Leeds and other musicians from his band, Sheila E. and musicians from her own band, as well as members from Wendy & Lisa's families. From these sessions, Prince compiled an album called The Flesh, supposed to be released by an eponymous pseudo-band, but the project was abandoned and its concept modified to become Madhouse.

The Japanese LP release of 8 credits the band members of Madhouse as: Eric Leeds – saxophone, John Lewis – drums, Bill Lewis – bass, Austra Chanel – keyboards. The band "members" are listed and mentioned on both sides of the obi issued with the Japanese LP release, as well as in the contained insert. As stated on the backside of the Obi: "In the U.S., rumors have arisen that 'Austra Chanel' is a pseudonym for Prince." More biography from the obi: "The group leader is Eric Leeds of The Revolution" and came to be formed after the Prince and The Revolution tour in Japan (summer 1986) when Eric Leeds returned to Atlanta to join old friends John Lewis, his brother Bill Lewis, and Austra. As noted on the Prince Estate official website, the background story of the Madhouse project was presented as a fictional band. Prince and Eric Leeds were the only participants in 8.

The title of each song on each album is also its numerical designation on the record (e.g., the third song on the first album is titled "Three"). Cover art for both albums featured Maneca Lightner playing with a small dog, reminiscent of a 1940s pinup photograph. The videos from 16 were more 1940s gangster-themed. The cover of 16 features the subtitle "new directions in garage music", an homage to Miles Davis' Directions in Music series (in 2002–2003, Prince would dub a jazz album series of his own New Directions in Music). The only vocals on either album consists mainly of audio snippets lifted from the first two Godfather films and samples of Vanity simulating an orgasm (from the Vanity 6 outtake "Vibrator", later used on Prince's own song "Orgasm" from Come). There is also a short unreleased 1987 movie, titled Hard Life, featuring Madhouse.

At least two other Madhouse albums were later recorded and remain unreleased, both albums titled 24.

The first 24 was recorded in 1988, mostly by Prince and Eric Leeds. Only one track eventually emerged, heavily edited, on Leeds' 1991 solo-album Times Squared and only bootlegged copies of the whole album are available. This album is more "electronic" than the first two, with a lot of drum programming, samples and keyboards. "21" through "24", also known as "The Dopamine Rush Suite", also feature vocals.

The second 24 was recorded in 1993 with a line-up consisting of Prince (keyboards), Leeds (saxophone), Levi Seacer Jr. (guitar), Sonny T. (bass) and Michael B. (drums). Only two tracks were officially released, "17 (Penetration)" (as "17" on the 1-800-NEW-FUNK 1994 compilation) and on the CD single "Standing at the Altar", the other one "Asswoop" (or "Asswhuppin' in a Trunk") in 2001, via Prince's website. There was also a limited release on the "NPG Sampler Experience" promo cassette, handed out during the 1995 Gold Tour, which contains excerpts from three tracks from this album: "Asswoop", "Ethereal Segue", and "Parlour Games". The album in its entirely is circulating on bootleg.

== Discography ==
=== Albums ===
==== 8 ====
1. "One" – 7:16
2. "Two" – 5:31
3. "Three" – 3:16
4. "Four" – 2:24
5. "Five" – 1:15
6. "Six" – 4:28
7. "Seven" – 4:09
8. "Eight" – 10:05

Produced and written by Madhouse, label: Paisley Park/Warner Bros., released: 1987

Billboard Top Pop Albums #107, Top Black Albums #25

==== 16 ====
1. "Nine" – 2:06
2. "Ten" – 5:04
3. "Eleven" – 6:14
4. "Twelve" – 5:14
5. "Thirteen" – 4:46
6. "Fourteen" – 5:12
7. "Fifteen" – 3:49
8. "Sixteen" – 4:17

Produced and written by Madhouse, label: Paisley Park/Warner Bros., released: 1987

=== 7" Singles ===
- "Six" b/w "6 and 1/2" (Hot Black Singles #5)
- "(The Perfect) 10" b/w "Ten and 1/2" (Billboard R&B Chart #66)
- "Thirteen" b/w "Four"

=== 12" ===
- "Six" – "Six", "Six (End of the World Mix)", "6 and 1/2" (Hot Dance / Disco 12-inch Singles Sales #24)
- "Ten" – "Ten (The Perfect Mix)", "Ten and 1/2", "Two".
- "Thirteen" – "Thirteen (The Paisley Park Mix)", "Thirteen and 1/4", "Four".

== See also ==
- Unreleased 24 album
