= Boni Boyer =

American singer (1958–1996)

Background information
- Also known as: Boni Queen B
- Born: Bonita Louisa Boyer; July 28, 1958; Washington, D.C., U.S.
- Died: December 4, 1996 (aged 38) San Pablo, California, Contra Costa County, California, U.S.
- Genres: Pop, funk, jazz fusion, alternative hip hop, R&B
- Occupations: Vocalist, multi-instrumentalist, composer, arranger
- Instruments: Vocals, keyboards
- Years active: 1976–1996
- Formerly of: Prince, Sheila E., Lionel Richie, Tony! Toni! Toné!, Con Funk Shun, Digital Underground, Al Jarreau Slyvester, Angela Bofill, Steven Winwood, Patti LaBelle

Boni Boyer (July 28, 1958 – December 4, 1996) was an American vocalist, multi-instrumentalist and composer. She was best known for her work with Prince in the late 1980s.

== Life and career ==
Boyer was playing keyboards and singing backing vocals with Sheila E.'s group when Prince was forming a new touring band after the break-up of The Revolution, in 1986. When Sheila E. became the drummer in the new band, she also brought Boyer and her bassist Levi Seacer, Jr. with her. Boyer performed as keyboardist and vocalist on the concert tours for Sign o' the Times and on the albums and concert tours for Lovesexy and Graffiti Bridge.

Technically Boni Boyer left Prince's band for Australia after the Lovesexy tour was over. The same goes for Cat, but Sheila E who protested the changing of the band, suffered back issues/collapsed lung after she parted ways with Prince when she did not agree with the direction of Prince's 4th album for her. When Prince formed The New Power Generation in 1990, Boyer left the band along with Sheila E. and Cat Glover. She performed and recorded with many artists, including Tony! Toni! Toné!, Con Funk Shun, Digital Underground, Lionel Richie and Al Jarreau.

Boyer died from a brain aneurysm in San Pablo, California, Contra Costa County, California, U.S.. Boyer's last recorded appearance before her death was on Raphael Saadiq's solo single "Ask of You" on the soundtrack to the 1994 film Higher Learning.

== Discography ==
With Prince

- Lovesexy (1988)
- Graffiti Bridge (1990)

With Sheila E.

- Sheila E. (1987)

With Al Jarreau

- Heaven and Earth (1992)

== Filmography ==
- Sign o' the Times (1987)
- The Adventures of Ford Fairlane (1990)
