= Directions in Music =

- Genre: Music
- Country of origin: Canada
- Original language: English
- No. of seasons: 1
- No. of episodes: 5

Production
- Production location: Vancouver
- Running time: 30 minutes

Original release
- Network: CBC Television
- Release: 23 April – 21 May 1961

Directions in Music is a Canadian music television miniseries that aired on CBC Television in 1961.

== Premise ==
This Vancouver production featured five episodes of various musical forms.

== Scheduling ==
This half-hour series was broadcast Sundays at 4:30 p.m. (Eastern) from 23 April to 21 May 1961.

== Episodes ==
1. "Apollo and Hyacinth", a 1949 composition by Hans Werner Henze, was sung by Winona Denyes (mezzo-soprano) with musicians conducted by John Avison
2. Lloyd Powell provided discussion and a performance of post-Bach piano music
3. Intimate opera was featured, including a London Intimate Opera Company performance of Thomas Arne's Thomas and Sally Works by Purcell and Offenbach were also noted in this episode.
4. James Joyce's compositions
5. A recital of madrigals by the Vancouver Cantata Singers under conductor Hugh McLean
