= Kahoru Kohiruimaki =

Japanese singer (born 1967)

Kahoru Kohiruimaki (小比類巻かほる, Kohiruimaki Kahoru; nicknamed Kohhy, born on March 16, 1967) is a Japanese singer who debuted in 1985. She had great success in the next ten years with around thirty singles, fifteen original albums and various compilations. Kohiruimaki is the most well known in the West for the song "Ai yo kienaide", the first opening theme song from the anime series City Hunter in 1987, and for the ending theme song for the OVA Gall Force in 1986. Kahoru Kohiruimaki’s sixth album Time The Motion was recorded at the studio of the iconic Prince, Paisley Park in Minnesota,in the US, in 1989. Two of the tracks were written and produced by Prince and Levi Seacer, Jr. Kahoru Kohiruimaki’s manager, Seijiro Udo, had promoted Prince’s Japanese concerts on the Lovesexy Tour, and Udo had asked Prince to provide some tracks for Kohiruimaki, leading to the recording of the two tracks, Mind Bells and Bliss.

== Discography ==
=== Albums ===
- Call My Name (November 21, 1985)
- No Problem (July 21, 1986)
- I'm Here (April 1, 1987)
- Hearts On Parade (January 21, 1988)
- SO REAL (November 11, 1988)
- TIME THE MOTION (November 11, 1989)
- DISTANCE (October 10, 1990)
- silent (September 25, 1991)
- FRONTIER (September 10, 1992)
- KOHHY 1 (May 25, 1994)
- KOHHY 2 (February 8, 1995)
- Anniversary Nights (December 15, 1997) (independent album, fan club only)
- This Is My Love Song (February 5, 1998) (reprise)
- Kaleidoscope (May 20, 1997)
- LOVE solution (December 20, 2001) (independent album, fan club only)
- Tree Diagram (July 20, 2011)
- KOHHY 3 (November 10, 2016)
- KOHHY 4 (December 10, 2018)
- KOHHY 5 (January 10, 2019)

=== Live albums ===
- TIME THE MOTION LIVE (July 25, 1990)
- silent fiction tour 1991 (January 25, 1992)
- FRONTIER LIVE '92 (February 25, 1993)

=== Compilation albums ===
- The Best (December 15, 1989)
- KOHHY'S SINGLES (July 25, 1991)
- Dreamin' '89-'92 (March 25, 1992)
- Ballade Collection (March 25, 1993)
- Keep on dreamin' remix (February 25, 1995)
- Black Kohhy Best '85-'89 (July 1, 1995)
- White Kohhy Best '89-'95 (July 21, 1995)
- STAR BOX EXTRA (December 5, 2001)
- THE LEGEND (January 1, 2003)
- Golden Best (ゴールデン☆ベスト) (January 26, 2005)
- Kohiruimaki Kahoru – 20th Anniversary Selection (June 29, 2005）

=== Singles ===
- "NEVER SAY GOOD-BYE" (October 21, 1985) (Ponytail wa Furimukanai theme song)
- "Ryotte Ippai no Johnny (両手いっぱいのジョニー)" (July 2, 1986) (OVA Gall Force ending theme)
- "Nagaku Atsui Yoru (長く熱い夜)" (December 21, 1986, theme song from the Nippon TV drama Kekkon Monogatari)
- "Hold On Me" (February 26, 1987)
- "City Hunter – Ai yo kienaide (〜愛よ消えないで〜)" (May 10, 1987) (City Hunter opening theme song)
- "I'm Here" (May 21, 1987)
- "COME ON" (September 21, 1987)
- "On The Loose" (January 1, 1988)
- "Tobenai Blue Bird (飛べないブルー・バード)" (May 21, 1988)
- "TONIGHT" (October 21, 1988)
- "TOGETHER" (November 21, 1988)
- "DREAMER" (September 25, 1989)
- "Ii Ko o Daite Nemuri nayo (いい子を抱いて眠りなよ)" (live version, February 1, 1990)
- "Twilight Avenue" (May 10, 1990)
- "LIKE A FACTORY" (November 10, 1990)
- "MOVING ACTION / CRAZY LOVER" (January 1, 1991)
- "TIMES GO BY" (March 25, 1991)
- "SMILE FOR ME" (April 25, 1992)
- "Control (コントロール)" (August 25, 1992)
- "La Festa: Ano Hi no mama de (〜あの日のままで〜)" (October 25, 1992)
- "Kimi wa Inspiration (君はインスピレーション)" (January 25, 1994)
- "SUMMER FACTOR" (April 1, 1994)
- "HELLO AGAIN" (May 10, 1994)
- "Step by Step" (November 22, 1994)
- "Ride On" (November 30, 1994, Tokumitsu no TV Columbus ending theme)
- "Super Hero" (December 7, 1994)
- "Justify My Love" (January 1, 1995)
- "Respect" (July 21, 1995)
- "Hi no Ataru Basho (陽のあたる場所)" (May 27, 1996)
- "Oh My Friend" (September 2, 1996)
- "Just as... I don't wanna fall in love again" (April 23, 1997)
- "What A Wonderful World" (January 21, 1998)
- "DANCING QUEEN" (August 30, 2000)
- "Blue Sky" (August 25, 2004)
- "Ano Hi no mama de (あの日のままで)" (July 1, 2014)

=== Videos ===
- Heart no Ballade in Budokan (ハートのパレード in 武道館)
- Heart no Ballade in Budokan 2 (ハートのパレード in 武道館 2)
- TIME THE MOTION LIVE
- silent fiction tour 1991
- KOHHY'S SINGLES VIDEO
- DREAMER
