= If I Was Your Girlfriend =

- US 7" single

Single by Prince

from the album Sign o' the Times
- B-side: "Shockadelica"
- Released: May 6, 1987
- Recorded: November 2, 1986; December 23, 1986 (intro segue)
- Studio: Sunset Sound, Hollywood
- Genre: Soul; synth-pop; synth-funk
- Length: 3:46 (7" edit); 4:54 (album / 12" version)
- Label: Paisley Park; Warner Bros.
- Songwriter: Prince
- Producer: Prince

Prince singles chronology
"Sign o' the Times" (1987)	"If I Was Your Girlfriend" (1987)	"U Got the Look" (1987)

"If I Was Your Girlfriend" is a song by American singer and songwriter Prince. The song serves as the second single from his ninth studio album Sign o' the Times (1987). The single was a hit in the UK (#20) but was only a minor hit in America (#67), though a major hit on black radio in America. It was originally from the Camille album, which was to be released under the guise of Prince's alter ego named Camille.

The song is delivered from an androgynous male perspective to a woman, wherein Prince explores the possibilities of a more intimate relationship if he were his lover's platonic girlfriend. Trouser Press names the song as one of the album's highlights, noting that it "redefines a relationship in a surprisingly mature way." It is believed that "If I Was Your Girlfriend" deals with the jealousy Prince felt at the close bond shared between then girlfriend-fiancée Susannah Melvoin with her twin sister Wendy.

Musically, the song features Prince's pitched-up, androgynous vocals over a sparse bass and drum machine pattern, punctuated by a keyboard line. The opening seconds include a sound collage that includes an orchestra tuning up, a salesman and a sample of Felix Mendelssohn's "Wedding March". According to engineer Susan Rogers, a rare technical error on her part led to distortion—albeit only on certain words. Yet after hearing the playback, Prince loved the effect, which is featured on the released version.

The song was released on May 6, 1987, and reached number 67 on the US Billboard Hot 100 but was more successful on the US Billboard Hot Black Singles reaching number 12. It was little more successful in the UK, reaching number 20.

== Track listings ==
7" single

- A. "If I Was Your Girlfriend" (edit) – 3:46
- B. "Shockadelica" – 3:30

12" single

- A. "If I Was Your Girlfriend" – 4:54
- B. "Shockadelica" (extended version) – 6:12

== Personnel ==
Credits from Duane Tudahl and Benoît Clerc

- Prince – lead and backing vocals, Fairlight CMI, Prophet VS, bass guitar, Linn LM-1, Publison IM90 Infernal Machine

== Charts ==
=== Weekly charts ===
Initial chart performance for "If I Was Your Girlfriend"
Chart (1987)	Peak position
Belgium (Ultratop 50 Flanders)	14
Italy (Musica e Dischi)	7
Italy Airplay (Music & Media)	11
Luxembourg (Radio Luxembourg)	17
Netherlands (Single Top 100)	17
New Zealand (Recorded Music NZ)	48
Switzerland (Schweizer Hitparade)	15
UK Singles (Official Charts)	20
US Billboard Hot 100	67

Chart performance for "If I Was Your Girlfriend" upon Prince's death
Chart (2016)	Peak position
France (SNEP)	188

== "Shockadelica" ==
The B-side to the track was another "Camille" track, "Shockadelica". Prince envisioned the track as the missing title track for Shockadelica, the then-unreleased album by former Time guitarist Jesse Johnson. Johnson said that the song was left on his doorstep and that he turned it down, after which Prince told him: "Well, if you don't put it out, I'm gonna put it out – and when they think of Shockadelica, they will think of me." According to Johnson, the two stopped talking until Prince reached out to him during the filming of Graffiti Bridge.

When the "Camille" project was scrapped in favor of Crystal Ball, "Shockadelica" again made the cut, but was deleted from the track list when the set was trimmed to Sign o' the Times. The track was released as a B-side, and later on The Hits/The B-Sides.

== Other uses ==
=== Cover versions ===
- "If I Was Your Girlfriend" was covered on the TLC album, CrazySexyCool, released in 1994, and on their FanMail Tour.
- The song was covered by Eels during their tours of 1997 and 1998. Their version was made commercially available on their 2008 rarities compilation Useless Trinkets: B-Sides, Soundtracks, Rarities and Unreleased 1996–2006.
- "If I Was Your Girlfriend" was covered by Martin Rossiter, released in 2012 on a cover EP called The Defenestration of Prince and Others.
- "If I Was Your Girlfriend" was covered by B.Slade, as "Girlfriend", on the 2012 album Stunt B%$@H.
- B-side "Shockadelica" was interpolated by Ween in their track "L.M.L.Y.P.", released in 1990 on their debut album, GodWeenSatan: The Oneness.

=== Sampling ===
- Mobb Deep sampled the song on their 1996 pre-Hell on Earth song "Young Luv".
- Chicano rapper Lil Rob samples "If I Was Your Girlfriend" on his 1997 Crazy Life album.
- In 2003, the Jay-Z/Beyoncé Knowles single, "'03 Bonnie & Clyde" (from The Blueprint²: The Gift & the Curse) used several lines of "If I Was Your Girlfriend", and Prince was credited as one of the writers.
- 2Pac sampled a live performance of "If I Was Your Girlfriend" for his song "Thugs Get Lonely Too"; the title is also a nod to another Prince composition called "Gigolos Get Lonely Too," performed by The Time. The song was recorded in 1993 but did not see official release until 2004, when the Prince samples were removed.
- George Clinton sampled "If I Was Your Girlfriend" for his song, "Heaven", off of his 2008 album George Clinton and His Gangsters of Love.

=== Appearances in other media ===
- "If I Was Your Girlfriend" and the B-side "Shockadelica" both appear in Demi Moore's 1996 film, Striptease.
