= Cat Glover =

American choreographer, dancer and singer (1962–2024)

Background information
- Born: Catherine Vernice Glover; July 24, 1962; North Lawndale, Chicago, Illinois, U.S.
- Died: September 24, 2024 (aged 62) Los Angeles, California, U.S.
- Genres: Funk; soul; pop; rock
- Occupations: Dancer; choreographer; vocalist
- Labels: Paisley Park; Warner Bros.

Catherine Vernice Glover (July 24, 1962 – September 24, 2024) was an American choreographer, dancer, singer, and rapper.

== Background ==
Catherine Vernice Glover was born on July 24, 1962, in the North Lawndale neighborhood of Chicago, (Note: Although the source cited specifies neither North nor South Lawndale, it can be confirmed via Google Map search that the specific address cited for her formative years—i.e. 1216 S. Lawndale Avenue, described elsewhere in the article as "in the heart of the impoverished Lawndale area"—is located about a block south of Roosevelt Road, placing it very close to the "heart" of North Lawndale.) Glover was raised first there and, from age 10 on, in Morgan Park, Chicago. The youngest of four girls born to Mildred Taylor and Doneall Glover, she was named after her maternal grandmother Catherine Taylor. Her birth date is given as July 23, 1964 in a number of obituaries; however, the date July 24, 1962 has been cited both after her death—by her manager, speaking with The New York Times—and during her life, by Glover herself, in a 1989 interview conducted by the performer's cousin, Chicago-based journalist Chinta Strausberg, then with the Chicago Defender.

Glover began performing at age 5 in a group called the Soullettes, started by her eldest sister Mitlitha and featuring the other three, Cat, Cynthia and Christine. At the age of eight, she appeared at the Playboy Towers Hotel in Chicago. Her first taste of mainstream television exposure came on the hit talent show Star Search, alongside dance partner Patrick Allen in the duo known simply as "Pat & Cat". Their act was the first to ever achieve a "Perfect Score" of Four Stars on the show. Glover was the standout member of the duo, winning the crowd over with her trademark dance move "Cat Scat".

== Career ==
Glover was best known for her work with Prince in the late 1980s. She choreographed and appeared in several of his videos and his concert film Sign o' the Times, traveled with him as a backing vocalist and dancer on the Sign o' the Times Tour and Lovesexy Tour, and rapped on both The Black Album track "Cindy C." and the Lovesexy song "Alphabet St." She was supposed to have released an album on Paisley Park, but the project was ultimately canceled.

Following her work with Prince, she moved to London, England and signed with Red Dot Records, a subsidiary of Warner Brothers' WEA International. She released an EP titled Catwoman (1989), produced and mixed by Tim Simenon of Bomb the Bass. The B-Side to "Catwoman" was a song called "Now it Rains", which Glover stated she had written about Prince. Glover also recorded a full-length album, titled I Am Energy, that was ultimately not released. Glover cited issues with a conflict of interest between her manager, Steve Fargnoli, who also owned Red Dot Records, as contributing to the album not being released by Warner Bros or WEA International.

Subsequently, she worked in London and Los Angeles, recording her own material as well as continuing her choreography and performing.

Glover also recorded vocals with Danish musician Nicolaj Steen, Marshall Jefferson with Jesse Saunders on their 1996 house anthem "12" Of Love", as well as Louie Louie, and Steve Hopkins.

== Personal life and death ==
Glover had four children and died at her home in Los Angeles, on September 24, 2024, at the age of 62. Glover's death was later revealed to be from congestive heart failure and chronic obstructive pulmonary disease (COPD).
