= Levi Seacer Jr. =

American musician (born 1961)

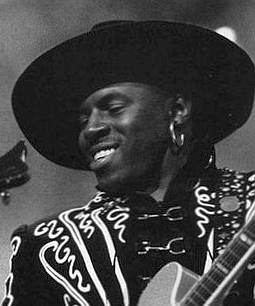
- Seacer in 1993

Background information
- Born: Levi Seacer Jr. April 30, 1961 (age 65)
- Origin: Richmond, California, U.S.
- Genres: R&B; funk; gospel
- Occupations: Musician; songwriter; producer
- Instruments: Bass; guitar; keyboards; vocals
- Labels: Paisley Park; NPG; Diamond Bridge Music
- Formerly of: New Power Generation; Madhouse
- Website: www.myspace.com/leviseacerjr

Levi Seacer Jr. (born April 30, 1961) is an American musician.

== Career ==
He was an early associate of Sheila E. when he was tapped by Prince to form a new touring band after the demise of the Revolution in 1986. Seacer became the band's bassist, as well as a backing vocalist. Later, he began collaborating with Prince as a songwriter on several projects. Seacer was a founding member of Prince's New Power Generation in 1991, switching from bass to the band's guitarist. He remained a member of the band until 1993, and also participated in the later version of Madhouse. After leaving the Prince camp in 1993, Seacer has worked as a producer and session musician on various projects, most notably the gospel music ensemble Sounds of Blackness.

In 1990, he produced the majority of Right Rhythm, a Motown-issued album recorded by the pop/R&B group The Pointer Sisters. In 1991, he performed various instruments on the album Moment of Truth by Terri Nunn.

== Lawsuit ==
In October 1998, Seacer, along with Tony M., filed a lawsuit against Prince, claiming that Prince hadn't shared royalties that Levi and Tony were owed for songs they had co-written for Prince's NPG Publishing, including "Sexy MF" and "My Name Is Prince". In the end, Mosley and Seacer settled for approximately $40,000 each (apparently, not even enough to pay their legal expenses), having sued Prince for $800,000.
