= Atlanta Bliss =

American jazz trumpeter

Matthew "Atlanta Bliss" Blistan (born c. 1952) is an American jazz trumpeter. He is best known for his work with Prince from 1985–1991. He won the Grammy Award for Best R&B Performance by a Duo or Group with Vocals for the 1986 single "Kiss" by Prince.

== Life and career ==
A native of Peters Township, Pennsylvania, Blistan was 33 years old and living in Atlanta when friend and Duquesne University classmate, Eric Leeds, brought him to Prince's attention. He joined Prince's band, The Revolution, in 1985, and first recorded the song, "Mountains", released on the 1986 album, Parade, a soundtrack to the 1986 film, Under the Cherry Moon. He was spontaneously given the nickname Atlanta Bliss one day as Prince entered the recording studio, singing and dancing, stating, "Atlanta Bliss plays like this."

Blistan spent thousands of hours recording and rehearsing with Prince over the next 6 years. He appeared in the 1987 concert film, Sign o' the Times, and performed on the track, "Sticky Wicked", with Miles Davis from Chaka Khan's 1988 album CK. Blistan left the band in 1991 and moved back to Pittsburgh. He continued to work on occasion with Leeds.

Blistan is married to Mary Anne Blistan, and the couple have two children.

== Discography ==
- Parade (1986) – Prince & the Revolution
- Sign o' the Times (1987) – Prince
- Lovesexy (1988) – Prince
- CK (1988) – Chaka Khan
- Time Waits for No One (1989) – Mavis Staples
- Batman (1989) – Prince
- The Cinderella Theory (1989) – George Clinton
- Graffiti Bridge (1990) – Prince
- The Hits/The B-Sides (1993) – Prince
- The Hits 1 (1993) – Prince
- I'm Ready (1993) – Tevin Campbell
- Carmen Electra (1993) – Carmen Electra
- The Black Album (1994) – Prince
- Crystal Ball (1998) – Prince; box set
- Ultimate Prince (2006) – Prince
- 1986-1991: The Warner Years (2011) – Miles Davis
