= Eric Leeds =

American saxophone player (born 1952)

- Born: January 19, 1952 (age 74); Milwaukee, Wisconsin, United States
- Origin: Pittsburgh, Pennsylvania, United States
- Genres: Pop, rock, funk, smooth jazz
- Occupation: Musician
- Instruments: Saxophone, flute
- Years active: 1980s–present
- Labels: Paisley Park/Warner Bros., Nouveau, Pony Canyon

Eric Leeds is an American saxophone player, mostly known for his work with Prince. He has recorded mostly music in the pop and funk genres, but is a studied jazz musician.

== Life and career ==
Leeds was born in Milwaukee, Wisconsin, the son of a retailer. He moved to Richmond, Virginia, at the age of seven, where he lived from 1959 to 1966, and then moved to Pittsburgh, Pennsylvania, at the age of fourteen, where he attended junior high school and college. Leeds lived in Pittsburgh for eighteen years and started a music career there. Leeds studied saxophone with mentor Eric Kloss, who had signed to Prestige Records at the age of sixteen. He attended Duquesne University. He played in a band named "On The Corner" during the 1970s, which consisted of two trumpets, one tenor sax, one baritone sax, and a four-piece rhythm section. Eric played baritone sax in the band. Rich Mansfield, also known as Brother Rick and the musical director from the American Soundtrack series played tenor sax in the band.

Leeds' brother, Alan Leeds, was the tour manager for Prince in the early 1980s and introduced his brother to Prince not long after the Purple Rain tour. Prince was impressed by Leeds' talents and featured him in the band The Family in 1985. The band was short-lived, but Prince invited Leeds into The Revolution for his Parade tour. Leeds brought along long-time friend Matt Blistan, who was renamed Atlanta Bliss by Prince.

After the breakup of The Revolution, Prince retained Leeds and Bliss for his succeeding band and used their talents greatly over his next three albums. Bliss left the fold in 1989 but Leeds lent his talents to Madhouse (1987–1993) and various Prince projects throughout the years.

In 1991, Leeds released the album Times Squared on Prince's Paisley Park Records, which incorporated rock, pop and jazz sounds. The tracks that Leeds chose for the album were recorded by Prince and Leeds between 1985 and 1988. A second album, entitled Things Left Unsaid, was released in 1993 with one Prince contribution.

The Family reunited in 2007 under the name fDeluxe with all original members (except Jerome Benton), including Leeds. In 2012, they released their album, Gaslight, independently.

== Discography ==
=== Solo albums ===
- Times Squared (Paisley Park, 1991)
- Things Left Unsaid (Paisley Park, 1993)
- Now & Again (Nouveau, 2000)

=== Prince albums ===
- Parade (1986)
- Sign o' the Times (1987)
- The Black Album (1987)
- Lovesexy (1988)
- Batman (1989) – original soundtrack
- Scandalous Sex Suite (1989) – single
- Diamonds and Pearls (1991)
- The Love Symbol Album (1992)
- Emancipation (1996)
- One Nite Alone... (2002) – live album
- N.E.W.S (2003)
- C-note (2004) – live album

=== Prince-related albums ===
- The Family - The Family (1985)
- Madhouse - 8 (1987)
- Madhouse - 16 (1987)
