= Paisley Park Records =

US record label founded by Prince

- Founded: 1985
- Founder: Prince
- Defunct: 1994
- Distributor: Warner Bros. Records
- Genre: Funk; R&B; rock; pop; new wave; Minneapolis sound; synthpop
- Country of origin: United States
- Location: 7801 Audubon Rd, Chanhassen, Minnesota, U.S. 55317

Paisley Park Records was an American record label founded by musician Prince in 1985, which was distributed by and funded in part by Warner Bros. Records. It was started in 1985, following the success of the film and album Purple Rain. The label shares its name with Prince's recording complex Paisley Park Studios and the song "Paisley Park" on his 1985 Around the World in a Day album.

== History ==
While Prince had great chart success in the 1980s, the success generally did not transfer to other acts. With the exception of Sheila E.'s 1985 album Romance 1600 (the label's debut non-Prince release), Tevin Campbell's single "Round and Round" and the Time's 1990 release Pandemonium, the label had very few commercial successes by artists other than Prince.

In 1994, amid Prince's feud with Warner Bros., Warner ended its distribution deal with Paisley Park, effectively closing the label. Prince fought for the rights to the master recordings of all artists recorded at the label's studios. Prince later started NPG Records, run by Trevor Guy.

The vice-president of Operations for the label until 1991 was Alan Leeds. (Leeds won a Grammy for writing the liner notes for a James Brown album, and at one point served as Prince's tour manager on several tours.) Following Leeds' departure, radio promotion executive Graham Armstrong took over the role until 1991, when Gilbert Davison and Jill Willis, co-managers of Prince and president and executive vice-president of Paisley Park Enterprises, negotiated a joint venture between PPE and Warner Bros. (with the help of Prince attorney Gary Stiffelman). With the joint venture came funding for additional staff to run the label and oversee its artists – including Mavis Staples, George Clinton, Ingrid Chavez and Carmen Electra. Staffers included John Dukakis and Kerry Gordy as co-presidents of the label.

The label's offices were in a building with the address 1999 Avenue of the Stars.

== Discography ==
=== Prince albums ===
- 1985: Prince and The Revolution: Around the World in a Day
- 1986: Prince and The Revolution: Parade
- 1987: Prince: Sign O' the Times
- 1988: Prince: Lovesexy
- 1990: Prince: Graffiti Bridge
- 1991: Prince and the New Power Generation: Diamonds and Pearls
- 1992: Prince and the New Power Generation: Love Symbol Album
- 1993: Prince: The Hits/The B-Sides

=== Paisley Park albums ===
- 1985: The Family: The Family
- 1985: Sheila E.: Romance 1600
- 1986: Mazarati: Mazarati
- 1987: Madhouse: 8
- 1987: Sheila E.: Sheila E.
- 1987: Jill Jones: Jill Jones
- 1987: Taja Sevelle: Taja Sevelle §
- 1987: Madhouse: 16 §
- 1988: Dale Bozzio: Riot in English
- 1988: The Three O'Clock: Vermillion §
- 1988: Good Question: Good Question
- 1989: Tony LeMans: Tony LeMans §
- 1989: George Clinton: The Cinderella Theory
- 1989: Kahoru Kohiruimaki: Time the Motion (Japanese release only)
- 1989: Mavis Staples: Time Waits for No One
- 1990: Kahoru Kohiruimaki: Time the Motion Live (Japanese release only)
- 1990: The Time: Pandemonium §
- 1991: Eric Leeds: Times Squared
- 1991: T.C. Ellis: True Confessions
- 1991: Ingrid Chavez: May 19, 1992
- 1993: Carmen Electra: Carmen Electra
- 1993: Mavis Staples: The Voice
- 1993: George Clinton: Hey, Man, Smell My Finger
- 1993: Eric Leeds: Things Left Unsaid

Note: All titles were distributed by Warner Bros. Records, except for those denoted with §, which were distributed by sister label Reprise Records.

== See also ==
- List of record labels
