= 3 Chains o' Gold =

3 Chains o' Gold may refer to:

- "3 Chains o' Gold" (song), a 1992 song by Prince
- 3 Chains o' Gold (film), a 1994 direct-to-video film starring Prince
