= 7 (Prince song) =

1992 single by Prince and the New Power Generation

Single by Prince and the New Power Generation

from the album Love Symbol Album
- B-side: "7" (acoustic)
- Released: November 17, 1992
- Recorded: September 1991–March 1992
- Studio: Paisley Park (Chanhassen, Minnesota)
- Genre: Pop rock; psychedelic pop; funk
- Length: 5:09 (album version); 4:23 (7-inch edit)
- Label: Paisley Park
- Songwriters: Prince; Lowell Fulsom; Jimmy McCracklin
- Producer: Prince

Prince and the New Power Generation singles chronology
"My Name Is Prince" (1992)	"7" (1992)	"Damn U" (1992)

Music video
- "7" on YouTube

"7" is a song by American musicians Prince and the New Power Generation. It was released on November 17, 1992, by the Paisley Park label as the third single from their Love Symbol Album (1992).

Featuring a sample of the 1967 Lowell Fulson song "Tramp", the track showcases a distinct Middle Eastern tone underscored by heavy drums and bass in an acoustic style, a Hindu reincarnation theme, and an opera-like chorus that features Prince's multi-tracked vocals. The ambiguous lyrics, which have religious and apocalyptic themes, can be interpreted in many ways, as the "7" mentioned in the chorus could be referring to the Seven Deadly Sins, the seven Archon of Gnosticism, or the seven names of God in the Old Testament.

The song received positive reviews and became the most successful single from the album in the United States, also peaking within the top 40 in many of its major international markets. Its accompanying music video was directed by Sotera Tschetter and received a nomination at the 1993 MTV Video Music Awards.

== Critical reception ==
Upon the release, Larry Flick from Billboard magazine wrote, "You can never be too sure of what this Paisley dude will serve up next. This time, he concocts a stew of old and new flavors: retro-funk shuffle beats are countered by hip-hop-style scratching and topped with flower-child strumming and sitars. The hook is rousing and immediate, and should find a welcome home at several levels lickety-split." Randy Clark from Cash Box stated, "This new single is an apocalyptic musical revelation done in the 'Give Peace a Chance' mode, except the elaborate vocal arrangements have the well disciplined guidance of the funk-meister." In his weekly UK chart commentary, James Masterton opined that, "with the Christmas competition this is unlilkely to become another massive hit for Prince." Iestyn George from NME viewed it as "lilting acoustic pop-funk with smart vocal harmonies and unforgivably crap lyrics." Richard Harrington from The Washington Post felt "the visionary '7', which has a genial psychedelic-folk-rockish '60s sound and spirit, could have fit comfortably on Around the World in a Day."

=== Retrospective response ===
In a 2017 retrospective review, Andy Healy from Albumism named the song a "standout" from the album, noting its "glorious, eastern inspired mystical magic" with "the multitude of layered vocals and hypnotic groove." He added, "Not to mention the cryptic lyrics—is he singing about the seven deadly sins, the seven seals of Revelations, the seven major religions or the seven major record labels." Alexis Petridis from The Guardian ranked "7" number 34 in his list of "Prince's 50 Greatest Singles – Ranked!" in 2019. He wrote, "If you want evidence of Prince's unique, almost mystical, abilities, '7' is an intriguing place to start." He added, "At heart, the song is a rousing acoustic campfire singalong with lyrics of a spiritual bent, albeit a fairly baffling one. Deeply unpromising on paper, he somehow makes it work to striking effect, spooning on the harmonies and vintage sitar effects." In 2020, Rolling Stone noted that the singer "expanded his sonic palette" on the song, "tapping into tablas and sitars, widescreen multi-tracked vocals and a sample of Lowell Fulson's 'Tramp'." The magazine noted further, "Of course, given his out-there status at the time, Prince may have also been dabbling in numerology".

Slant Magazine ranked "7" number 66 on their list of "The 100 Best Singles of the 1990s" in 2011, writing, "A Bible verse as related by a New World prince, '7' is a lush allegory for the perils of romantic strife, set across deserts and streets of gold and featuring armies, plagues, and angels. Among the fiercest tracks from Prince and the New Power Generation’s Love Symbol Album, this rock soap opera is a predictable cock-storm of funk, the One and Only’s vulnerable, emotion-rich falsetto wielding the same blunt-force trauma as the swords and tambourines that are dropped into the production with the sort of timing that would be corny if it weren’t so swoony. Way before he takes it to church, Prince’s intellect and savoir-faire has saved the day."

== Chart performance ==
In the United States, "7" was most successful on the Billboard Top 40/Mainstream chart, peaking at No. 3, and it was a top-10 hit on the Billboard Hot 100, on which it peaked at No. 7. On the Billboard Top 40/Rhythm-Crossover chart, it peaked at No. 19, while on the Billboard Hot R&B Singles chart, it stalled at No. 61. On the Canadian RPM 100 Hit Tracks chart, the song peaked at No. 12. The single reached No. 27 in the UK, falling short of the success of the previous two releases, "Sexy MF" and "My Name Is Prince", which had become top 10 hits. Internationally, the song reached No. 12 in New Zealand and charted within the top 40 in Australia and several European countries.

== Music video ==
Directed by American designer, art director, music video director and producer Sotera Tschetter, the music video for the song, filmed on February 27, 1992, begins with Mayte whispering "imagine" in Prince's ear, in the position they are in on the single cover. The video set is pictured on the Love Symbol album cover, along with a still shot from the video. In the video, Prince symbolically "kills" incarnations of himself who are trapped inside glass chambers. A scene from 3 Chains o' Gold also appears, which features Mayte belly-dancing. There are little girls wearing yellow belly-dancing outfits almost identical to Mayte's and little boys wearing black outfits and eyebands identical to Prince's.

The video is also notable for Mayte dancing with a sword on her head, which she would later do in live performances; the video featured her in the role she played in 3 Chains o' Gold as an Egyptian princess who befriends Prince and enlists his help to find the men who assassinated her father. Mayte kisses and releases a Eurasian Collared Dove during her performance. The video was nominated for an MTV Video Music Award for Best R&B Video, but lost to "Free Your Mind" by En Vogue.

== Track listings ==
- 7-inch and CD single
1. "7" (LP version) – 5:13
2. "7" (acoustic version) – 3:54
- 12-inch single
1. "7" (LP version) – 5:13
2. "7" (acoustic version) – 3:54
3. "7" (After 6 Long Version) – 5:15
- 12-inch and CD maxi-single
1. "7" (LP version) – 5:13
2. "7" (After 6 Edit) – 4:20
3. "7" (After 6 Long Version) – 5:15
4. "7" (acoustic version) – 3:54
5. "7" (album edit) – 4:23
6. "2 Whom It May Concern" – 4:01

== Personnel ==
Personnel are taken from Benoît Clerc and Guitarcloud

- Prince – lead and backing vocals, acoustic guitar, electric sitar, synthesizers, bass guitar, programming, finger cymbals, percussion, handclaps

== Charts ==
=== Weekly charts ===
Weekly chart performance for "7"
Chart (1992–1993)	Peak position
Australia (ARIA)	25
Belgium (Ultratop 50 Flanders)	32
Canada Retail Singles (The Record)	3
Canada Top Singles (RPM)	12
Europe (Eurochart Hot 100)	56
Europe (European Dance Radio)	21
Germany (GfK)	77
Iceland (Íslenski Listinn Topp 40)	39
Italy (Musica e Dischi)	23
Netherlands (Dutch Top 40)	28
Netherlands (Single Top 100)	34
New Zealand (Recorded Music NZ)	12
Switzerland (Schweizer Hitparade)	28
UK Singles (Official Charts)	27
UK Airplay (Music Week)	12
UK Dance (Music Week)	34
US Billboard Hot 100	7
US Dance Singles Sales (Billboard)	8
US Hot R&B/Hip-Hop Songs (Billboard)	61
US Pop Airplay (Billboard)	3
US Rhythmic Airplay (Billboard)	19

=== Year-end charts ===
Year-end chart performance for "7"
Chart (1993)	Position
Canada Top Singles (RPM)	97
US Billboard Hot 100	52
US Cash Box Top 100	30

== Certifications ==
Certifications for "7"
Region	Certification	Certified units/sales
United States (RIAA)	Gold	500,000^{^}
^{^} Shipments figures based on certification alone.

== Release history ==
Release dates and formats for "7"
Region	Date	Format(s)	Label(s)	Ref.
United States	November 17, 1992	7-inch vinyl; 12-inch vinyl; CD; cassette	Paisley Park; Warner Bros.	
United Kingdom	November 23, 1992	7-inch vinyl; 12-inch vinyl; CD; cassette	Paisley Park; Warner Bros.	
Japan	January 25, 1993	Mini-CD	Warner Music Japan	
