= 3 Chains o' Gold (film) =

1994 film by Prince

- Directed by: Parris Patton; Randee St. Nicholas; Prince (as Paisley Park)
- Produced by: Paisley Park
- Starring: Prince and The New Power Generation
- Music by: Prince
- Distributed by: Warner Reprise Video
- Release date: August 16, 1994
- Running time: 73 minutes
- Country: United States
- Language: English

3 Chains o' Gold is a 1994 American direct-to-video film produced and directed by Prince and starring Prince and The New Power Generation. It is a collection of videos for songs from Love Symbol, tied together with a loose plotline. The film was the 69th best-selling video of 1994.

== Plot ==
The story begins with the assassination of Egyptian Princess Mayte's father by seven unknown assailants. Mayte believes that the assassins were after the sacred "3 Chains of Gold". She sets out to meet with Prince, as she believes he is the only one that can protect the chains from the seven assassins. What follows is a romance between Prince and Mayte, and Prince organizing the assassination of the assailants (accompanied by the song "7"). Local television anchors Randy Meier and Lauren Green were featured in this film, sitting at the anchor desk, while Kirstie Alley reported from the field.

== Film and album ==
The film was accompanied by the Love Symbol album; however, not all of the album's songs make an appearance in the film, and some of the songs are edited versions. The film's title song is only an instrumental at the end. However, some of the dialogue from the album does appear in the film (a phone call from a reporter, played by Kirstie Alley, to Prince). The final speech of the film (made by Mayte) does not appear on the album; instead, another phone call is in its place. The actual songs that appear in the film are:

- "My Name Is Prince"
- "Sexy MF"
- "Love 2 the 9s"
- "The Morning Papers"
- "The Max"
- "Blue Light"
- "I Wanna Melt with U"
- "Sweet Baby"
- "The Continental"
- "Damn U"
- "7"
- "The Call"

== See also ==
- List of American films of 1994
