= The Morning Papers =

1993 single by Prince and the New Power Generation

- UK 7-inch single

Single by Prince and the New Power Generation

from the album Love Symbol Album
- B-side: "Live 4 Love"; "Love 2 the 9's"
- Released: March 1, 1993
- Recorded: December 31, 1991
- Studio: Paisley Park (Chanhassen, Minnesota)
- Genre: Pop rock
- Length: 3:57
- Label: Paisley Park; Warner Bros.
- Songwriter: Prince
- Producer: Prince

Prince and the New Power Generation singles chronology
"Damn U" (1992)	"The Morning Papers" (1993)	"Pink Cashmere" (1993)

Music video
- "The Morning Papers" on YouTube

"The Morning Papers" is a song by American musician Prince and the New Power Generation from their 1992 album Love Symbol. It was released as the fourth worldwide (and fifth overall) single from the album in March 1993, by Paisley Park and Warner Bros.; the B-side is "Live 4 Love", a track from Prince's previous album, Diamonds and Pearls (1991). The UK CD single included "Love 2 the 9's" as well, also from Love Symbol. "The Morning Papers" peaked at numbers 44 and 35 on the US Billboard Hot 100 and Cash Box Top 100.

The lyrics of the song concern Prince falling in love with Mayte Garcia, and sticks to the theme of the movie 3 Chains o' Gold, where Mayte (a princess in Egypt) and Prince meet after her father is assassinated by seven mysterious men. Prince sings about the things they do together and how other people do not value/understand the bond they share. Musically, the song is a pop-rock ballad with an emphasis on guitar. The accompanying music video, directed by Randee St. Nicholas, is notable for featuring Prince embracing "the grunge look".

== Critical reception ==
In a 2017 retrospective review, Andy Healy from Albumism stated that the pop-rock of the song "reinforce that no style or genre was beyond Prince's command". Upon the release, Larry Flick from Billboard magazine described it as "a cinematic rock ballad, rife with retro-soul nuances". He added further, "An appealing, storytelling vocal is surrounded by rousing piano lines, nimble guitar riffs, and brassy horn fills. And, of course, Prince delivers a strong, affecting vocal. Will prove to be a refreshing respite from the usual cookie-cutter fare on pop radio." Randy Clark from Cash Box commented, "All hail the latest release from his Royal Badness' platinum album. This soulful, mid-tempo blues ballad has all the teasing, playful spirit we have grown to expect from the punk with the funk."

Alan Jones from Music Week named it Pick of the Week, praising it as "a straightforward pop ballad" and "a refreshing and simple song, enlivened by a powerful and flashy guitar solo". Terry Staunton from NME viewed it as "tired balladesque fillers" and "the kind of inconsequential piece of bland funk you'd expect to hear as the credit rolled at the end of Graffiti Bridge." Parry Gettelman from Orlando Sentinel felt the slow track have a strong melody, complimenting it as "a pretty ballad spiced with R&B horns and pop-blues guitar." Charles Aaron from Spin wrote, "Another bewitching bit of gush from the past year's screwiest album. "If he poured his heart into a glass / And offered it like wine", etc., is pure pop poetry."

== Chart performance ==
"The Morning Papers" was a moderate success on all the charts on which it appeared. It peaked at number 44 on the US Billboard Hot 100, number 18 on the Billboard Top 40 Mainstream chart, number 68 on the Billboard R&B/Hip-Hop Songs chart, number 35 on the Cash Box Top 100, and number 52 in the UK.

The song became the first song by Prince released in proper form in the United Kingdom to miss the top 40 since "Mountains" in 1986, seven years earlier (this means that 23 of Prince's songs in a row had made the top 40 before "The Morning Papers"). The song, despite missing the Billboard top 40, made the Top 40 mainstream chart, meaning it received significant radio airplay in America.

== Personnel ==
Personnel are adapted from Benoît Clerc and Guitarcloud.

- Prince – lead and backing vocals, electric guitar, percussion
- Levi Seacer Jr. – electric guitar
- Tommy Barbarella – synthesizers
- Sonny T. – bass guitar
- Michael B. – drums
- Michael B. Nelson – trombone
- Kathy Jensen – baritone saxophone
- Brian Gallagher – tenor saxophone
- Dave Jensen – trumpet
- Steve Strand – trumpet

== Charts ==
Weekly chart performance for "The Morning Papers"
Chart (1993)	Peak position
Australia (ARIA)	87
Belgium (Ultratop 50 Flanders)	42
Canada Top Singles (RPM)	24
Europe (European Hit Radio)	7
Iceland (Íslenski Listinn Topp 40)	37
Netherlands (Dutch Top 40)	24
Netherlands (Single Top 100)	39
Switzerland (Schweizer Hitparade)	31
UK Singles (Official Charts)	52
UK Airplay (Music Week)	8
US Billboard Hot 100	44
US Hot R&B/Hip-Hop Songs (Billboard)	68
US Pop Airplay (Billboard)	18
US Cash Box Top 100	35

== Release history ==
Release dates and formats for "The Morning Papers"
Region	Date	Format(s)	Label(s)	Ref.
United Kingdom	March 1, 1993	7-inch vinyl; CD; cassette	Paisley Park; Warner Bros.	
Australia	March 7, 1993	CD; cassette	Paisley Park; Warner Bros.	
