= Damn U =

- US 7" single

Single by Prince and The New Power Generation

from the album Love Symbol Album
- B-side: "2 Whom It May Concern"
- Released: November 17, 1992
- Recorded: October 10, 1991
- Studio: Paisley Park, Chanhassen, Minnesota, US
- Genre: Quiet storm; neo soul; R&B
- Length: 4:04
- Label: Paisley Park; Warner Bros.
- Songwriter: Prince
- Producer: Prince

Prince and The New Power Generation singles chronology
"7" (1992)	"Damn U" (1992)	"The Morning Papers" (1993)

Music video
- "Damn U" on YouTube

"Damn U" is a song by American musician Prince and the New Power Generation, released in November 1992 as the fourth single from his fourteenth studio album, Love Symbol (1992). It is a slow-grooving romantic R&B ballad, featuring strings and violin. Prince sings of a woman who affects him greatly emotionally, and uses the term "damn u" as an expression of surprise at the woman's power over him. His vocal range shifts throughout the song from very high falsetto to his deeper lower baritone. The B-side was "2 Whom It May Concern", which was also available on the maxi single for "7". Its music video was directed by Randee St. Nicholas.

== Chart performance ==
"Damn U" was released as a limited edition single and tailored for the R&B market; it became the lowest charting single from the album. It failed to make the US Billboard Hot 100, but it peaked at number eight on the Bubbling Under Hot 100 Singles chart. It fared better on the R&B/Hip-Hop chart, where it made the Top 40, peaking at number 32. It received the most airplay on Mainstream Urban and Urban Adult Contemporary radio stations, and reached the top 10 on R&R's UAC Airplay chart. The single was not released anywhere else in the world.

== Critical reception ==
In a 2017 retrospective review, Andy Healy from Albumism opined that the song is one of "the weak points" on the Love Symbol album, saying that it "underwhelm and feel more like filler". Irish Bray People called it a "soft" and "oozy" ballad. Randy Clark from Cashbox described it as a "soulful ballad". Greg Sandow from Entertainment Weekly said the "ironic, lounge-flavored "Damn U", glimmer with a strange, furtive light." John Martinucci from the Gavin Report stated, "Prince delivers this sultry, urban-only torchlight ballad and it has the same performance that made "Insatiable" and "Do Me Baby" memorable slow jams." A reviewer from Music & Media called it a romantic ballad "for the after hours." Parry Gettelman from Orlando Sentinel felt it's "deliciously, comically overblown - from the swelling strings to the lyrics about "this kooky love affair"." Charles Aaron from Spin described it as a "tinkly, quiet-storm ballad", which "Babyface would blush for". Richard Harrington from The Washington Post complimented "Damn U" as "another falsetto gem", "a slow, sweet ballad laced with the ecstatic emotions of a rewarding relationship."

== Music video ==
A music video was produced to promote the single, directed by Randee St. Nicholas. It features Prince singing in the outfit he is wearing on the cover, sitting on a stool with shots of the New Power Generation performing the music. The video is notable for featuring Mayte Garcia, and was used in the 1994 direct-to-video film 3 Chains o' Gold. The video was later published on Prince's official YouTube channel in September 2017, and as of January 2023, it had generated almost 2 million views.

== Personnel ==
Credits from Benoît Clerc and Guitarcloud

- Prince – lead and backing vocals, electric guitar, synthesizers, finger cymbals
- Kirstie Alley – spoken word
- Levi Seacer Jr. – electric guitar
- Sonny T. – bass guitar
- Michael B. – drums
- Clare Fischer – orchestral arrangement

== Charts ==
Chart performance for "Damn U"
Chart (1992–1993)	Peak position
US Bubbling Under Hot 100 Singles (Billboard)	8
US Hot R&B/Hip-Hop Songs (Billboard)	32
