= My Name Is Prince =

1992 single by Prince and the New Power Generation

- UK 7-inch single

Single by Prince and the New Power Generation

from the album Love Symbol Album
- B-side: "Sexy Mutha"
- Released: September 28, 1992
- Recorded: September 18, 1991
- Studio: Paisley Park (Chanhassen, Minnesota)
- Genre: New jack swing; hip hop; funk
- Length: 6:37 (album version); 4:05 (7-inch edit)
- Label: Paisley Park; Warner Bros.
- Songwriters: Prince; Tony M.
- Producer: Prince

Prince and the New Power Generation singles chronology
"Sexy MF" (1992)	"My Name Is Prince" (1992)	"7" (1992)

Music video
- "My Name Is Prince" on YouTube

"My Name Is Prince" is a song by American musician Prince and his backing band the New Power Generation, released in September 1992 by Paisley Park and Warner Bros. as the second single from their 1992 Love Symbol album. The song is about Prince himself and his musical prowess. The rap sequence is performed by NPG member Tony M. The intro to the song features vocal samples from Prince's earlier songs "I Wanna Be Your Lover", "Partyup", and "Controversy". Its accompanying music video was directed by Parris Patton and featured Kirstie Alley and Lauren Green.

The B-sides to the single are "Sexy Mutha", a clean remix of "Sexy MF", and "2 Whom It May Concern", a preview of songs from the then-upcoming Love Symbol album.

== Chart performance ==
"My Name Is Prince" returned Prince and the NPG to radio and the Top 40 in the US after their previous single, the provocative "Sexy MF" failed to chart on any airplay charts. "My Name Is Prince" received modest airplay on Mainstream Urban and Rhythmic radio stations, earning respectable positions of number 25 on the R&B/Hip-Hop chart, number 20 on the Rhythmic Top 40, and number 36 on the Hot 100. In the UK, "My Name Is Prince" was another Top 10 hit for Prince and the NPG, peaking at number seven.

The remixes single also charted, hitting number 51 in the UK.

== Critical reception ==
Larry Flick from Billboard magazine wrote, "The prolific Paisley One introduces his new album with a percussive ditty that earns high marks for its appealing live sound and ferocious, scratch-happy funk beat. Because the tune is taken out of the conceptualized context of the album, the lyrics seem a bit curious at times." Bray People described "My Name Is Prince" as a "self-mocking explosion of throbbing funk." Randy Clark from Cashbox commented, "Well, all hail his funky high-ness. Sure, he's got $100,000,000.00 and now he can blow his own horn louder than anyone. This song can be interpreted a few ways. 1) a slammin' funky, but meaningless dance track; 2) his self-obsession is blocking his ability to write anything poignant; 3) the man is a full-blown, Napoleonistic, megalomaniac who has now launched himself into the same self-glorifying world as Michael Jackson and Madonna. Naturally, he produces himself."

Dave Sholin from the Gavin Report said, "Clever as ever and fuuunnky to the max, this track once again displays how versatile, creative and unpredictable Prince truly is, and why he must be considered musical royalty." Dave Bennun from Melody Maker wrote, "Here we find Prince in hard and funky work-out mode, no great shakes compared to the likes of 'Erotic City', 'Gett Off' and 'Sexy Muthaf***a', but a moderate-to-acceptable taster for his new concept album". Parry Gettelman from Orlando Sentinel felt it's "one of the weaker numbers" of the album, adding, "It's a killer parody of Hammer-style hip-hop. The beat is funkier than anything Hammer ever came up with, and the braggadocio is hilarious. However, the repetitive chorus and Prince's uncharacteristically harsh vocals don't wear well."

== Retrospective response ==
In a 2020 retrospective review, Andy Healy from Albumism remarked that the song is "ironically titled”. Stephen Thomas Erlewine from AllMusic called it a "dance smash", stating that the album "has Prince's best dance tracks since The Black Album." In 2019, Alexis Petridis from The Guardian ranked "My Name Is Prince" number 27 in his list of "Prince's 50 Greatest Singles", stating that it reasserted the musician's authority "in style." He added, "Its intro listed his hits, its lyric switched between proclaiming himself divinely chosen and fretting about judgment day, and its music dealt in heavy breakbeats and noise that suggested he had been listening to Public Enemy."

== Music video ==
The music video for "My Name Is Prince" was filmed in August and September 1992 and directed by Parris Patton. It features American actress Kirstie Alley as news reporter Vanessa Bartholomew and Lauren Green as a studio anchor. In the video, fans are rioting to see Prince perform onstage. However, instead of performing onstage, he dances with his band in an alleyway while shooting his latest music video, wearing the outfit from the single's artwork (a police uniform and cap with chainmail obscuring his face), singing into a microphone in the shape of a gun, and inciting riots and general chaos.

== Track listing ==
- UK 7-inch
1. "My Name Is Prince" (Edit) – 4:05
2. "2 Whom It May Concern" – 4:02
- US 7-inch
1. "My Name Is Prince" (Edit) – 4:05
2. "Sexy Mutha" – 3:55
- UK 12-inch picture disc
1. "My Name Is Prince" (LP version) – 6:38
2. "Sexy Mutha" – 3:55
3. "2 Whom It May Concern" – 4:02
- UK CD1
1. "My Name Is Prince" (Edit) – 4:05
2. "Sexy Mutha" – 3:55
3. "2 Whom It May Concern" – 4:02
4. "My Name Is Prince" (LP version) – 6:38
- UK CD2
1. "My Name Is Prince" (Original Mix Edit) – 8:06
2. "My Name Is Prince" (12-inch Club Mix) – 8:11
3. "Sexy M.F." (12-inch Remix) – 7:34
- US CD single
1. "My Name Is Prince" (Original Mix Edit) – 8:06
2. "My Name Is Prince" (12-inch Club Mix) – 8:11
3. "My Name Is Prince" (House Mix) – 7:18
4. "My Name Is Prince" (Hard Core 12-inch Mix) – 7:55
5. "Sexy M.F." (12-inch Remix) – 7:34
- Japan CD maxi-single
1. "My Name Is Prince" (Original Mix Edit) – 8:06
2. "My Name Is Prince" (12-inch Club Mix) – 8:11
3. "My Name Is Prince" (House Mix) – 7:18
4. "My Name Is Prince" (Hard Core 12-inch Mix) – 7:55
5. "Sexy M.F." (12-inch Remix) – 7:34
6. "Sexy Mutha" – 3:55
7. "Sexy M.F." (Clean version) – 5:24
8. "2 Whom It May Concern" – 4:02

== Personnel ==
Personnel are taken from Benoît Clerc and Guitarcloud.

- Prince – lead and backing vocals, synthesizers, electric guitar, bass guitar, programming
- Tony M. – rap

== Charts ==
=== Weekly charts ===
Weekly chart performance for "My Name Is Prince"
Chart (1992)	Peak position
Australia (ARIA)	9
Austria (Ö3 Austria Top 40)	7
Belgium (Ultratop 50 Flanders)	11
Canada Top Singles (RPM)	80
Denmark (IFPI)	7
Europe (Eurochart Hot 100)	10
Europe (European Dance Radio)	1
France (SNEP)	29
Germany (GfK)	19
Greece (Pop + Rock)	3
Hungary (Rádiós Top 40)	32
Ireland (IRMA)	5
Italy (Musica e dischi)	2
Netherlands (Dutch Top 40)	7
Netherlands (Single Top 100)	8
New Zealand (Recorded Music NZ)	7
Portugal (AFP)	2
Spain (AFYVE)	6
Sweden (Sverigetopplistan)	15
Switzerland (Schweizer Hitparade)	14
UK Singles (Official Charts)	7
UK Singles (Official Charts) Remixes	51
UK Airplay (Music Week)	11
UK Dance (Music Week)	15
UK Dance (Music Week) Remixes	26
UK Club Chart (Music Week)	60
US Billboard Hot 100	36
US Hot R&B/Hip-Hop Songs (Billboard)	25
US Rhythmic Airplay (Billboard)	20

=== Year-end charts ===
Year-end chart performance for "My Name Is Prince"
Chart (1992)	Position
Australia (ARIA)	85
Europe (European Dance Radio)	17
Sweden (Topplistan)	87
