= Michael J. Fuchs =

American television producer (born 1946)

Michael J. Fuchs (pronounced "Fewks") (born March 9, 1946) is an American executive producer for premium cable television network HBO.

== Career ==
Fuchs is the son of Charles Fuchs, a real estate executive. He was educated at Union College in Schenectady, New York, where he obtained a B.A. in political science in 1967, and a J.D. degree at New York University in 1971.

After gaining experience in entertainment law, Fuchs joined HBO and became active in sports TV production. Fuchs held various senior positions by the early 1980s and became chief executive officer and chairman of the board in 1984.

In May 1995, Fuchs became vice president of Time Warner and then chairman and CEO of the Warner Music Group. However, he was fired by Time Warner chairman Gerald Levin on November 16, 1995.

Fuchs has produced many concerts for HBO featuring such performers as Bette Midler, Diana Ross, and Johnny Cash, and he is highly active in C-SPAN (the Cable Satellite Public Affairs Network) and Comedy Central, which is an advertiser-supported network owned by Viacom.

After leaving Time Warner, Fuchs was the chairman of the Broadway Theatre Archive, which distributed productions of theatre originally made for public television.

Fuchs is also chairman of the Bryant Park Corporation and is credited for being the inventor of the HBO Bryant Park Summer Movie Festival, one of New York's most popular free summer events.

== Awards ==
- CableACE Governor's Award (1993)
- CableAce Award Dramatic or Theatrical Special "In the Gloaming" (1997)
