= Love Symbol =

1992 studio album by Prince

Studio album by Prince & the New Power Generation
- Released: October 13, 1992
- Recorded: September 11, 1990; December 1990; May 12, 1991; September 18, 1991 – March 1992; July 1992
- Genres: R&B; pop; soul; funk; rock; hip hop
- Length: 75:00
- Labels: Paisley Park; Warner Bros.
- Producers: Prince and the New Power Generation

Prince chronology
| Diamonds and Pearls (1991) | Love Symbol (1992) | The Hits/The B-Sides (1993) |

The New Power Generation chronology
| Diamonds and Pearls (1991) | Love Symbol (1992) | Gold Nigga (1993) |

Alternative cover
- Cover without the symbol

Singles from Love Symbol
- 1. "Sexy MF" Released: June 30, 1992; 2. "My Name Is Prince" Released: September 28, 1992; 3. "7" Released: November 17, 1992; 4. "Damn U" Released: November 17, 1992; 5. "The Morning Papers" Released: April 3, 1993

The "Love Symbol" album, also known as Love Symbol, Symbol Album, or Symbol, is the fourteenth studio album by American recording artist Prince, and the second of the two that featured his backing band the New Power Generation. It was released on October 13, 1992, by Paisley Park Records and Warner Bros. Records. It was originally conceived as a "fantasy rock soap opera" with various spoken segues throughout, and contains elements of R&B, funk, pop, rock, and soul.

The official title of the album is an unpronounceable symbol depicted on its cover art, which Prince copyrighted under the title "Love Symbol #2", and adopted as his stage name from 1993 to 2000 to protest his treatment by Warner Bros. Records (which had refused to steadily release his back catalog of unreleased music, and which he claimed to have trademarked his given name for promotional purposes).

Its first two singles, "Sexy MF" and "My Name Is Prince", achieved modest success on the US pop chart, though both made the top ten in the United Kingdom. Conversely, the third single, "7", was not as successful in the United Kingdom, but was a top ten hit in the United States.

== Background ==
An early configuration of the album contained as many as eight segues, as well as an introduction setting the scene of Prince's self-proclaimed "rock opera". These helped to provide a narrative thread to the songs which when taken together explained the album's conceptual storyline: An Egyptian Princess (played by Mayte Garcia, in her debut on a Prince album) falls in love with a rock star (Prince) and entrusts him with a sacred religious artifact known as the Three Chains of Turin (colloquially referred to by Prince as the 3 Chains o' Gold) after escaping from seven assassins who had murdered her Father in cold blood in an attempt to obtain the priceless relic, as referenced in "7".

In a last-minute attempt to add an additional song: "I Wanna Melt with U", which contains several sampled elements also present in "7" (and which was originally considered as a non-album B-side for the "7" maxi single), Prince had to cut many of the segues in order for its inclusion and to fit within album length constraints. The few that remain are somewhat confusing without the connective tissue these excised segues had helped provide. The unreleased segues have long been available amongst fans in the years since, and it is likely that any future Super Deluxe Edition release of the album by the Paisley Park Estate will see them reinstated.

On the released album, the segues featuring Kirstie Alley as reporter Vanessa Bartholomew are mostly kept intact. In these, she scrambles to salvage some sense of an interview with the elusive rock star (Prince) but fails at the first hurdle when he promptly hangs-up after she informs him he is being recorded. In a later segue, Prince toys with Vanessa and her line of increasingly intrusive questioning by being purposefully vague and responding with nonsensical answers for his own amusement. A few lines in which Vanessa inquires about the Three Chains of Turin was edited from the final sequence provided for mastering and release.

In 1994, Prince released 3 Chains o' Gold, a direct-to-video film that featured songs from the album and a similar storyline.

== Critical reception ==
Professional ratings
Review scores
| Source | Rating |
|---|---|
| AllMusic | 4.5/5 stars |
| Chicago Tribune | 3.5/4 stars |
| Christgau's Consumer Guide | A− |
| Entertainment Weekly | A− |
| The Guardian | 4/5 stars |
| Los Angeles Times | 2/4 stars |
| Q | 4/5 stars |
| Rolling Stone | 3.5/5 stars |
| The Rolling Stone Album Guide | 4/5 stars |
| Spin Alternative Record Guide | 7/10 |

The Love Symbol Album was voted the 14th best record of 1992 in the Pazz & Jop, an annual poll of American critics nationwide, published by The Village Voice. Robert Christgau, the poll's creator, later wrote of the album: "Designed to prove his utter inexhaustibility in the wake of Diamonds and Pearls, by some stroke of commerce his best-selling album since Purple Rain, this absurdly designated 'rock soap opera' (is he serious? is he ever? is he ever not?) proves mainly that he's got the funk."

== Track listing ==
All tracks are written by Prince, except where noted; all tracks arranged and produced by Prince and The New Power Generation.

| No. | Title | Writer(s) | Length |
|---|---|---|---|
| 1. | "My Name Is Prince" | Prince; Tony M. | 6:36 |
| 2. | "Sexy MF" | Prince; Tony M.; Levi Seacer, Jr. | 5:25 |
| 3. | "Love 2 the 9's" | | 5:45 |
| 4. | "The Morning Papers" | | 3:57 |
| 5. | "The Max" | | 4:30 |
| 6. | "Segue" | | 0:21 |
| 7. | "Blue Light" | | 4:38 |
| 8. | " Wanna Melt with U" | | 3:50 |
| 9. | "Sweet Baby" | | 4:01 |
| 10. | "The Continental" | | 5:31 |
| 11. | "Damn U" | | 4:25 |
| 12. | "Arrogance" | | 1:35 |
| 13. | "The Flow" | Prince; Tony M. | 2:26 |
| 14. | "7" | Prince; Lowell Fulson; Jimmy McCracklin | 5:13 |
| 15. | "And God Created Woman" | | 3:18 |
| 16. | "3 Chains o' Gold" | | 6:03 |
| 17. | "Segue" | | 1:30 |
| 18. | "The Sacrifice of Victor" | | 5:41 |

Notes

• Every use of the pronoun "I" throughout the song titles and liner notes is represented by. Prince fans commonly transliterate this symbol as "Eye".

• My Name Is Prince contains a sample of I Wanna Be Your Lover off his second album Prince (1979), Partyup off his third Dirty Mind (1980) and Controversy off his fourth Controversy (1981).

=== Special editions ===
Several editions of this album were released. Early pressings of the album featured an embossed gold love symbol on the jewel case, sometimes matte, sometimes glossy. Later editions feature it printed on the booklet or not present at all. A Special Limited Edition Gold Box CD was released with a purple love symbol engraved in the golden box. One boxed set came with a bonus "Sexy MF" CD single, another with a specially created CD single of "My Name Is Prince" mixes.

=== Early configuration ===
Below is the early version of the album with all the original segues. "The Sacrifice of Victor" is slightly longer on the early configuration.

1. "Intro"
2. "My Name Is Prince"
3. "Sexy MF"
4. "Segue"
5. "Love 2 the 9's"
6. "The Morning Papers"
7. "The Max"
8. "Segue"
9. "Blue Light"
10. "Segue"
11. "Sweet Baby"
12. "Segue"
13. "The Continental"
14. "Damn U"
15. "Segue"
16. "Arrogance"
17. "The Flow"
18. "Segue"
19. "7"
20. "Segue"
21. "And God Created Woman"
22. "3 Chains o' Gold"
23. "Segue"
24. "The Sacrifice of Victor"

== Personnel ==
Adapted from Benoît Clerc

=== Musicians ===
==== Prince and The New Power Generation ====
- Prince – lead vocals (tracks 1–5, 7–16, 18), rap (track 13), spoken vocals (tracks 6, 17), backing vocals (tracks 1, 3–5, 7–10, 14–16, 18), electric guitar (tracks 1, 3–5, 7–8, 10–13, 16, 18), acoustic guitar (track 14), electric sitar (track 14), bass guitar (tracks 1, 5, 8, 10, 14), synthesizers (tracks 1, 5, 7–12, 14), piano (track 16), drums (track 7), programming (tracks 1, 5, 7–8, 10, 14, 18), finger snapping (track 3), percussion (tracks 4, 14), claps (tracks 5, 12, 14), Tambourine (tracks 8, 16), finger cymbals (tracks 11, 14)
- Tony M. – rap (tracks 1–3, 5, 13, 18), spoken vocals (tracks 3, 12), backing vocals (track 12)
- Tommy Barbarella – synthesizers (tracks 2–4, 9, 12, 15–16, 18), Hammond organ (track 2)
- Michael B. – drums (tracks 2–4, 9, 11–12, 15–16, 18)
- Damon Dickinson – backing vocals (tracks 2–3, 12–13, 18), percussion (tracks 2–3, 12)
- Kirk Johnson – backing vocals (tracks 2–3, 12–13, 18), percussion (tracks 2–3, 12, 15–16)
- Levi Seacer Jr. – lead vocals (track 2), electric guitar (tracks 2–4, 9, 11–12, 15–16, 18)
- Sonny T. – bass guitar (tracks 2–4, 9, 11–12, 15–16, 18)
- Mayte – lead vocals (track 3), spoken vocals (tracks 3, 5, 16), backing vocals (tracks 7, 15)

==== Additional musicians ====
- Brian Gallagher – tenor saxophone (tracks 2–4, 10, 12–13, 15–16, 18)
- DJ Graves – scratching (tracks 2–3, 5, 8, 10, 12–13, 18)
- Dave Jensen, Steve Strand – trumpet (tracks 2–4, 10, 12–13, 15–16, 18)
- Kathy Jensen – baritone saxophone (tracks 2–4, 10, 12–13, 15–16, 18)
- Michael B. Nelson – trombone (tracks 2–4, 10, 12–13, 15–16, 18)
- Airiq Anest – programming (tracks 5, 8, 10, 13)
- Kirstie Alley – spoken vocals (tracks 6, 11–12, 17)
- Michael Koppelman – bass guitar (track 7), synthesizers (track 7)
- Eric Leeds – saxophone (track 7)
- Carmen Electra – rap (track 10)
- String orchestra (tracks 11, 16)
- Fred Steele, J D Steele, Jearlyn Steele, Jevetta Steele – backing vocals (track 18)

=== Technical ===
- Prince – producer
- Keith Cohen – additional producer, mixing
- George Black – additional producer (track 8)
- David Friedlander – recording engineer (tracks 1–6, 8–18)
- Steve Noonan – recording engineer (tracks 1–6, 8–18), additional mixing, mastering
- Ray Hahnfedt, Brian Poer – recording engineers (tracks 1–5, 8–18), additional mixing
- Michael Koppelman – recording engineer (tracks 1–5, 7, 9, 12, 15, 18), mixing
- Peter Arata – recording engineer (tracks 6, 11–12, 17–18)
- Larry Mahn – recording engineer (tracks 11, 16)
- Airiq Anest, Dave Aron, Steve Durkee – assistant recording engineers (tracks 1–5, 8–16, 18), additional mixing
- Tom Garneau, Bob Rosa, Steve Beltran – mixing
- Brian Gardner – mastering
- Clare Fischer – string arrangements (tracks 11, 16)

== Publishing ==
- All songs published by Controversy Music/WB Music Corp.; except:
  - Track 1 (Copyright NPG Music/Michael Anthony Music), track 15 (NPG Music)
  - Track 12 (Controversy Music/WB Music Corp; contains a sample of "I Know You Got Soul" by Eric B. & Rakim which is published by Songs of Polygram International Inc./Robert Hill Music; contains a sample of "Jazz It Up" originally by C.F.M. Band and also a sample of "Niggaz 4 Life" by N.W.A; copyright Ruthless Attack Muzik/Sony Songs/Bridgeport Music).
  - Track 14 published by Controversy Music; additional publishing by Powerforce Music/Budget Music; sample of "Tramp" by Lowell Fulson published by Blues Interactions, Inc.

== Singles ==
- "Sexy MF" maxi-single (No.66 US, No. 76 US R&B, No. 4 UK)
- "My Name Is Prince" maxi-single (No. 36 US, No. 25 US R&B, No. 7 UK)
- "7" maxi-single (No. 7 US, No. 3 US R&B, No. 27 UK)
- "Damn U" (No. 105 US, No. 32 US R&B)
- "The Morning Papers" maxi-single (No. 44 US, No. 8 US R&B, No. 52 UK)

== Charts ==
Weekly chart performance for Love Symbol
| Chart (1992) | Peak position |
|---|---|
| Australian Albums (ARIA) | 1 |
| Austrian Albums (Ö3 Austria) | 1 |
| Dutch Albums (Album Top 100) | 6 |
| Finnish Albums (Suomen virallinen lista) | 8 |
| German Albums (Offizielle Top 100) | 5 |
| New Zealand Albums (RMNZ) | 4 |
| Norwegian Albums (VG-lista) | 10 |
| Spanish Albums (AFYVE) | 5 |
| Swedish Albums (Sverigetopplistan) | 10 |
| Swiss Albums (Schweizer Hitparade) | 4 |
| UK Albums (Official Charts) | 1 |
| US Billboard 200 | 5 |
| US Top R&B/Hip-Hop Albums (Billboard) | 8 |

== Certifications and sales ==
Certifications and sales for Love Symbol
| Region | Certification | Certified units/sales |
|---|---|---|
| Australia (ARIA) | Platinum | 70,000^{^} |
| Austria (IFPI Austria) | Gold | 25,000^{*} |
| France | — | 200,000 |
| Japan (RIAJ) | Gold | 100,000^{^} |
| Spain (Promusicae) | Gold | 50,000^{^} |
| Switzerland (IFPI Switzerland) | Gold | 25,000^{^} |
| United Kingdom (BPI) | Platinum | 300,000^{^} |
| United States (RIAA) | Platinum | 1,000,000^{^} |
^{*} Sales figures based on certification alone.^{^} Shipments figures based on certification alone.
