= Warner Records =

American record label

Warner Records Inc.
- Parent company: Warner Music Group (WMG)
- Founded: 1928; 98 years ago (As Music Publishers Holding Company); March 19, 1958; 68 years ago
- Founder: Warner Bros.
- Distributors: Self-distributed; (United States); Warner Music Group; (International); Rhino Entertainment Company; (Reissues)
- Genre: Various
- Country of origin: United States
- Location: Los Angeles, California, U.S.
- Official website: warnerrecords.com

Warner Records (known as Warner Bros. Records until 2019) is an American record label owned by Warner Music Group. It is headquartered in Los Angeles, California, and was founded in 1958 as the recorded music division of American film studio Warner Bros. Pictures.

== History ==
Evolution of Warner Music Group
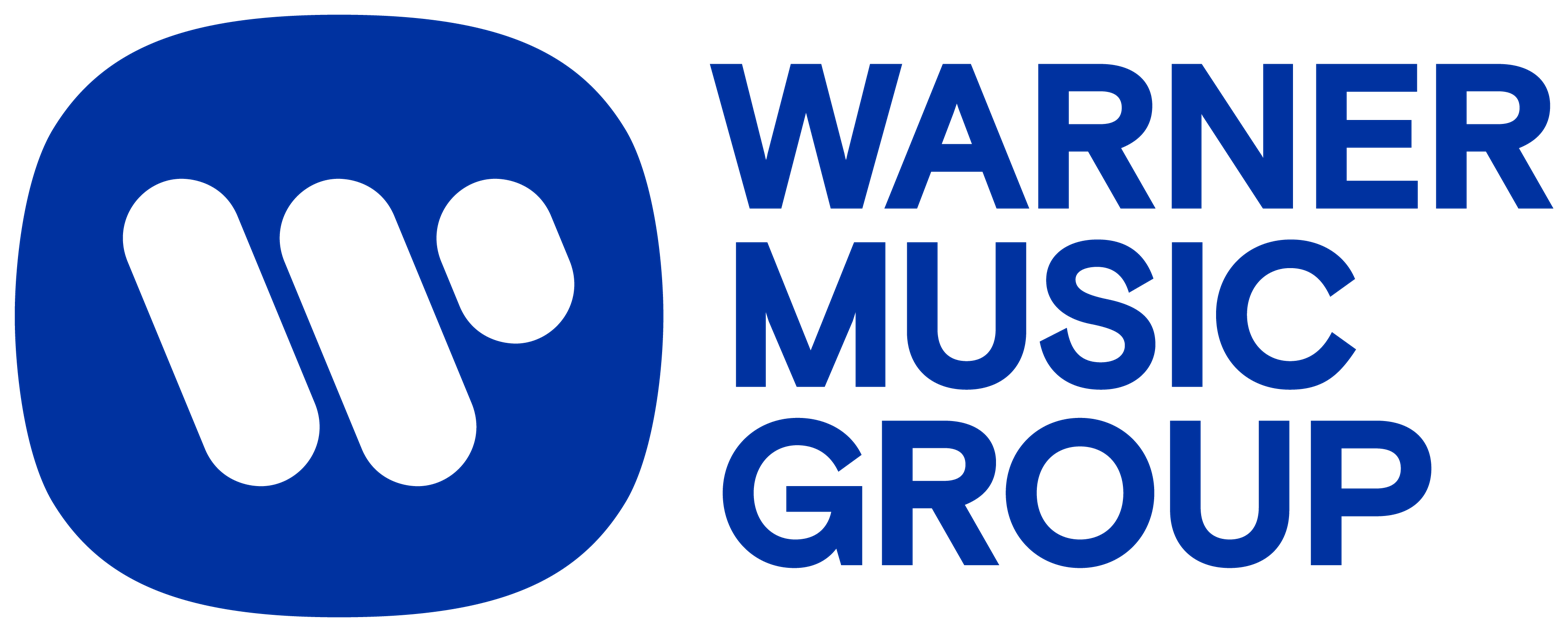
- 1928: By the end of the Silent Era, Jack Warner established a short-lived company called Music Publishers Holdings to oversee song rights for Warner Bros. films
- 1958: Nearly thirty years later, Warner Bros. returned to the music business with the creation of Warner Bros. Records to ensure its musicians were contracted
- 1963: Warner Records acquired Frank Sinatra's Reprise Records, and the labels were consolidated as Warner/Reprise
- 1967: After Jack Warner sold his company, Warner Bros.-Seven Arts was formed; and it acquired Atlantic Records and established Warner Music Canada
- 1968: Warner Bros.-Seven Arts Records, the rebranded Warner/Reprise, would lay the foundation for shared music distribution
- 1970: Kinney National Company acquired Elektra Records several months after buying Warner Bros., and established Kinney Record Group International
- 1971: Warner Music Group was established in its modern form with the separate Warner-Elektra-Atlantic labels being brought under one distribution network
- 1972: Kinney divested its non-media assets into a separate company and renamed itself Warner Communications; it also purchased Asylum Records
- 1978: WEA Manufacturing was created to develop vinyl records and cassettes
- 1981: MTV was launched by Warner-Amex and it quickly became popular from songs by Warner-Elektra-Atlantic musicians
- 1987: Warner Chappell Music became Warner's music publisher after Chappell was acquired from PolyGram N.V.
- 1988: Warner's international music footprint expanded with the purchase of the German record label, Teldec, and by 1991, Warner Classics was established
- 1990: Time Warner became the new parent company of Warner Music Group, and Warner Music Vision was formed as its primary music video distributor
- 1995: Controversy with Interscope Records led to changes at the corporate level; several long-time music execs departed, such as Mo Ostin, Mike Fuchs, and Doug Morris
- 2003: Edgar Bronfman Jr. led investors to acquire Warner Music from Time Warner, and he would serve as the company's CEO until 2011, overseeing its IPO
- 2011: Access Industries, an investment firm acquired Warner Music Group from the Bronfman Family and took it private
- 2013: Universal sold Parlophone Label Group to Warner to gain antitrust approval for its purchase of the EMI Group Limited
- 2019: Warner Bros. Records is renamed to Warner Records due to the expiration of its license to use the Warner Bros. logo
- 2020: Warner Music once again becomes a public company, with Access Industries remaining its controlling shareholder

=== Founding ===
At the end of the silent movie period, Warner Bros. Pictures decided to expand into publishing and recording so that it could access low-cost music content for its films. In 1928, the studio acquired several smaller music publishing firms which included M. Witmark & Sons, Harms Inc., and a partial interest in New World Music Corp., and merged them to form the Music Publishers Holding Company. This new group controlled valuable copyrights on standards by George and Ira Gershwin and Jerome Kern, and the new division was soon earning solid profits of up to US$2 million every year.

In 1930, Music Publishers Holding Company (MPHC) paid US$28 million to acquire Brunswick Records (which included Vocalion), whose roster included Duke Ellington, Red Nichols, Nick Lucas, Al Jolson, Earl Burtnett, Ethel Waters, Abe Lyman, Leroy Carr, Tampa Red and Memphis Minnie, and soon after the sale to Warner Bros., the label signed rising radio and recording stars Bing Crosby, Mills Brothers, and Boswell Sisters. Unfortunately for Warner Bros., the dual impact of the Great Depression and the introduction of broadcast radio greatly harmed the recording industry—sales crashed, dropping by around 90% from more than 100 million records in 1927 to fewer than 10 million by 1932 and major companies were forced to halve the price of records from 75 to 35 cents.

In December 1931, Warner Bros. offloaded Brunswick to the American Record Corporation (ARC) for a fraction of its former value, in a lease arrangement which did not include Brunswick's pressing plants. Technically, Warner maintained actual ownership of Brunswick, which with the sale of ARC to CBS in 1939 and their decision to discontinue Brunswick in favor of reviving the Columbia label, reverted to Warner Bros. Warner Bros. sold Brunswick a second time (along with Brunswick's back catalog up to 1931) in 1941, this time along with the old Brunswick pressing plants Warner owned, to Decca Records (which formed its American operations in 1934) in exchange for a financial interest in Decca. The heavy loss it incurred in the Brunswick deal kept the studio out of the record business for almost 20 years, and during this period it licensed its film music to other companies for release as soundtrack albums.

=== 1958–1963: Formation and early years ===
The gold, black and red label design used for Warner Bros. stereo albums from 1958 to 1967 and mono albums from 1964 to 1967.

The grey, black, white and yellow label design used for Warner Bros. mono albums from 1958 to 1964 when it switched to the same gold label as the stereo version.

Warner Bros. returned to the record business on March 19, 1958, with the establishment of its own recording division, Warner Bros. Records. By this time, the established Hollywood studios were reeling from multiple challenges to their former dominance—the most notable being the introduction of television in the late 1940s. Legal changes also had a major impact on their business—lawsuits brought by major stars had effectively overthrown the old studio contract system by the late 1940s and, beginning in 1949, anti-trust suits brought by the U.S. government forced the five major studios to divest their cinema chains.

In 1956, Harry Warner and Albert Warner sold their interest in the studio and the board was joined by new members who favored a renewed expansion into the music business—Charles Allen of the investment bank Charles Allen & Company, Serge Semenenko of the First National Bank of Boston and investor David Baird. Semenenko in particular had a strong professional interest in the entertainment business and he began to push Jack Warner on the issue of setting up an 'in-house' record label. With the record business booming – sales had topped US$500 million by 1958 – Semnenko argued that it was foolish for Warner Bros. to make deals with other companies to release its soundtracks when, for less than the cost of one motion picture, they could establish their own label, creating a new income stream that could continue indefinitely and provide an additional means of exploiting and promoting its contract actors.

Another impetus for the label's creation was the music career of Warner Bros. actor Tab Hunter. Although Hunter was signed to an exclusive acting contract with the studio, it did not prevent him from signing a recording contract, which he did with Dot Records, owned at the time by Paramount Pictures. Hunter scored several hits for Dot, including the US No. 1 single, "Young Love" (1957) and, to Warner Bros.' chagrin, reporters were primarily asking about the hit record, rather than Hunter's latest Warner movie. In 1958, the studio signed Hunter as its first artist to its newly formed record division, although his subsequent recordings for the label failed to duplicate his success with Dot.

Warner Bros. agreed to buy Imperial Records in 1956 and, although the deal fell apart, it marked the breaking of a psychological barrier: "If the company was willing to buy another label, why not start its own?" To establish the label, the company hired former Columbia Records president James B. Conkling; its founding directors of A&R were Harris Ashburn, George Avakian, and Bob Prince. Conkling was an able administrator with extensive experience in the industry—he had been instrumental in launching the LP format at Columbia and had played a key role in establishing the National Academy of Recording Arts and Sciences the previous year. However, Conkling had decidedly middle-of-the-road musical tastes (he was married to Donna King of vocal quartet the King Sisters), and was thus rather out of step with emerging trends in the industry, especially the fast-growing market for rock 'n' roll music.

Warner Bros. Records opened for business on March 19, 1958. Its early album releases (1958–1960) were aimed at the upscale end of the mainstream audience, and Warner Bros. took an early (though largely unsuccessful) lead in recording stereo LPs that targeted the new "hi-fi" market. The catalogue in this period included:

- vocal/spoken word albums by Warner contract players such as Tab Hunter, Edd Byrnes, Connie Stevens, Jack Webb and William Holden
- novelty/comedy albums by artists such as Spike Jones and Bob Newhart
- film soundtracks and collections of film and TV themes
- 'middle of the road' instrumental albums by artists including Matty Matlock, Buddy Cole, Henry Mancini, George Greeley, Warren Barker and "Ira Ironstrings" (a pseudonym for guitarist Alvino Rey, Conkling's brother-in-law, who was in fact under contract to Capitol Records at the time).

Some albums featured jokey or self-deprecating titles such as:

- Music for People with $3.98 (Plus Tax If Any),
- Terribly Sophisticated Songs: A Collection of Unpopular Songs for Popular People,
- Songs the Kids Brought Home from Camp,
- Please Don't Put Your Empties on the Piano, and
- But You've Never Heard Gershwin with Bongos.

Almost all were commercial failures; and the only charting album in Warner Bros.' first two years was Warren Barker's 'soundtrack' album for the studio's hit series 77 Sunset Strip, which reached No. 3 in 1959. Tab Hunter's "Jealous Heart" (WB 5008), which reached No. 62, was Warner Bros.' only charting single during its first year.

Early Warner Bros. singles had distinctive pink labels, with the WB logo at the top center and "WARNER" in white Hellenic font to the left of the WB shield and "BROS." in the same color and style font to the right. Below the shield in white Rockwell font, it read "VITAPHONIC HIGH FIDELITY;" this 45 label was used for two years, 1958 – 1960. This initial 45 label was soon replaced by a new, all-red label with the WB shield logo at 9 o'clock and a number of different-colored arrows (blue, chartreuse, and yellow) surrounding and pointing away from the center hole. The first hit was the novelty record "Kookie, Kookie (Lend Me Your Comb)", with words and music by Irving Taylor, which reached No. 4 on the Billboard Hot 100. It was nominally performed by Warner contract actor Edd Byrnes, who played the wisecracking hipster character Gerald Lloyd "Kookie" Kookson III on Warner's TV detective series 77 Sunset Strip. The story behind the recording illustrates the sharp practices often employed by major recording companies. Actress and singer Connie Stevens (who appeared in the Warner TV series Hawaiian Eye) spoke on the song's chorus, but although her record contract entitled her to a five-percent royalty rate, the label arbitrarily defined her contribution to be a favor to Byrnes, and assigned her just 1% royalty on the song, despite the fact that, as she soon discovered, her name was being prominently displayed on the single's label. Warner Bros. also charged her for a share of the recording costs, which was to be recouped from her drastically reduced royalty. When Stevens scored her own hit single with "Sixteen Reasons" in 1960, Warner Bros. refused to allow her to perform it on Hawaiian Eye because it was not published by MPHC, and they also prevented her from singing it on The Ed Sullivan Show, thereby robbing her of nationwide promotion (and a $5000 appearance fee).

With only two hits to its credit in two years, the label was in serious financial trouble by 1960, having lost at least US$3 million. Music historian Fredric Dannen reported that the only reason it was not closed down was the Warner board's reluctance to write off the additional $2 million the label was owed in outstanding receivables and inventory. After a restructure, Conkling was obliged to report to Herman Starr. He rejected a buyout offer by Conkling and a group of other record company employees but agreed to keep the label running in exchange for heavy cost-cutting—the staff was reduced from 100 to 30 and Conkling voluntarily cut his own pay from $1000 to $500.

Warner Bros. now turned to rock 'n' roll acts in hopes of advancing its sales but their first signing, Bill Haley, was by then past his prime and failed to score any hits. The label was more fortunate with its next signing, the Everly Brothers, whom Warner Bros. secured after the end of their previous contract with Cadence Records. Herman Starr effectively gambled the future of the company by approving what was reputed to be the first million-dollar contract in music history, which guaranteed the Everly Brothers $525,000 against an escalating royalty rate of up to 7 percent, well above the industry standard of the day. The duo were fielding offers from all the major labels as their Cadence contract wound up, but Warners eventually won out because the brothers harboured ambitions to branch out into film, and the label's connection to the movie studio provided the perfect opportunity. Luckily, the Everlys' first Warner Bros. single "Cathy's Clown" was a smash hit, climbing to No. 1 in the US and selling more than eight million copies, and their debut Warner Bros. album It's Everly Time reached No. 9 on the album chart.

In late 1959, Warner Bros signed a virtually unknown Chicago-based comedian, Bob Newhart, marking the beginning of the label's continuing involvement with comedy. Newhart provided the label's next major commercial breakthrough — in May 1960, three months after the success of "Cathy's Clown", Newhart's debut album The Button-Down Mind of Bob Newhart unexpectedly shot straight to No. 1 in the US, staying at the top for fourteen weeks, charting for more than two years and selling more than 600,000 copies. Capping this commercial success, Newhart scored historic wins in three major categories at the 1961 Grammy Awards — he won Album of the Year for Button-Down Mind, his quickly released follow-up album, The Button-Down Mind Strikes Back (1960) won the Best Comedy Performance–Spoken Word category, and Newhart himself won Best New Artist, the first time in Grammy history that a comedy album had won Album of the Year, and the only time a comedian has won Best New Artist.

Interviewed for the official Warner Bros Records history in 2008, Newhart recalled at the time he signed with the label he was totally unknown outside Chicago, he was still working full-time as an accountant, and he had done only a few local radio and TV appearances. His break came thanks to a friend, local DJ Dan Sorkin, who knew Warner CEO Jim Conkling. Sorkin arranged for Newhart to make a demo tape of a few of his original sketches, which Conkling heard and liked. Equally remarkably, Newhart revealed that he had never performed in a club before recording the album. Warners arranged to record him at a Houston, Texas club called The Tidelands, where he was booked for a two-week residency as the opening act, beginning February 12, 1960, and Newhart freely admitted to being "terrified" on his first night. He quickly realised that he had only enough material for one side of an album, but by the time Warner A&R manager George Avakian arrived for the recording, Newhart had hastily written enough new material to fill both sides of an LP. When Newhart contacted Warners in April to find out when the album would be released, he was amazed to be told that the label was rushing all available copies to Minneapolis, because radio DJs there had broken it, and it had become so popular that a local newspaper was even printing the times that tracks would be played on air. He recalled that the success of the album almost instantly kick-started his career, and that he was soon being deluged with appearance offers, including The Ed Sullivan Show. A few months later, when Newhart met Conkling and Jack Warner at a dinner, he recalled that Warner effusively greeted him as "the man who saved Warner Brothers Records".

Despite the turnaround in the label's commercial and critical fortunes at the start of the new decade, Jim Conkling was unexpectedly forced out as CEO during 1961. The ostensible reason for his ousting was that Warner and the studio executives doubted Conkling's commitment to the label, after they discovered that he had sold his shares of Warner Bros stock, netting him around $1 million. However, label biographer Warren Zanes and former WBR executive Stan Cornyn both opined that this was merely a pretext, and that the studio effectively scapegoated Conkling for the label's earlier failures, pointing to the fact that Conkling's successor had been selected well before Conkling was terminated. Conkling resigned in the fall of that year, and was replaced by Mike Maitland, another former Capitol Records executive. Around the same time, Joe Smith was appointed as head of promotions.

Warner Bros. made another prescient signing in folk group Peter, Paul & Mary. The trio had been on the verge of signing with Atlantic Records, but before the deal could be completed they were poached by Warner Bros. Artie Mogull (who worked for one of Warner Bros.' publishing companies, Witmark Music) had introduced their manager Albert Grossman to Herman Starr, and as a result the group signed a recording and publishing deal with Warner Bros. Grossman's deal for the group broke new ground for recording artists — it included a substantial advance of $30,000 and, most significantly, it set a new benchmark for recording contracts by stipulating that the trio would have complete creative control over the recording and packaging of their music.

Soon after, Grossman and Mogull signed a publishing deal that gave Witmark one of its most lucrative clients, Bob Dylan. Grossman bought out Dylan's previous contract with Leeds Music and signed the then-unknown singer-songwriter to Witmark for an advance of $5000. Two years later in 1963, Peter, Paul & Mary scored two consecutive Top 10 hits with Dylan songs, launching Dylan's career, and this was followed by many more hits by artists covering Dylan's songs, alongside the growing commercial success of Dylan himself. Grossman benefited enormously from both deals, because he took a 25% commission as Dylan's manager, and he structured Dylan's publishing deal so that he received 50% of Witmark's share of Dylan's publishing income—a tactic that was later emulated by other leading artist managers such as David Geffen.

Meanwhile, the label enjoyed further major success with comedy recordings. Comedian Allan Sherman (who had been signed on the personal recommendation of George Burns), issued his first Warner LP My Son, the Folk Singer in 1962. The album, which satirized the folk boom, became a major hit, selling over a million copies, and winning a Gold Record award, and is cited as being the fastest-selling LP ever released in the US up to that time. Sherman also scored a hit single in late 1963 with a cut from his third WBR album, My Son, The Nut, when his song "Hello Muddah, Hello Faddah" (which satirized the American summer camp tradition) became a surprise novelty hit, peaking at No. 2.

Bill Cosby broke through soon after and he continued the label's run of success with comedy LPs into the late 1960s, releasing a string of highly successful albums on Warner Bros. over the next six years, alongside his career as a TV actor.

The label's fortunes had finally turned around by 1962 thanks to the Everly Brothers, Newhart, folk stars Peter, Paul & Mary, jazz and pop crossover hit Joanie Sommers and comedian Allan Sherman, and Warner Bros. Records ended the financial year 1961–62 in the black for the first time since its founding.

=== Warner/Reprise 1963–1967 ===
In August 1963, Warner Bros. made a "rescue takeover" of Frank Sinatra's ailing Reprise Records as part of a deal to acquire Sinatra's services as a recording artist and as an actor for Warner Bros. Pictures. The total deal was valued at around US$10 million, and it gave Sinatra a one-third share in the combined record company and a seat on the Warner/Reprise board; Warner Bros. Records head Mike Maitland became the president of the new combine and Mo Ostin was retained as manager of the Reprise label.

Reprise was heavily in debt at the time of the takeover, and the Warner Records management team was reportedly dismayed at their balance sheet being pushed back into the red by the acquisition, but they were given no choice in the matter. Ben Kalmenson, a Warner Bros. company director and close aide to Jack Warner, summoned the label's directors to a meeting in New York and explicitly told them that both he and Warner wanted the deal and that they expected them to vote in favor of it.

Despite these misgivings, the purchase ultimately proved very beneficial to the Warner group. Reprise flourished in the late 1960s thanks to Sinatra's famous comeback and the hits by Sinatra and his daughter Nancy, and the label also secured the US distribution rights to the recordings of the Kinks and Jimi Hendrix. Most importantly for the future of the company, the merger brought Reprise manager Mo Ostin into the Warner fold and "his ultimate value to Warner Bros. would dwarf Sinatra's." Ostin's business and musical instincts, and his rapport with artists were to prove crucial to the success of the Warner labels over the next two decades.

In 1964, Warner Bros. launched Loma Records, which was meant to focus on R&B acts. The label, run by former King Records promotion man Bob Krasnow, would release over 100 singles and five albums, but saw only limited success and was wound down in 1968.

An important addition to the Warner Bros. staff in this period was Ed Thrasher, who moved from Columbia Records in 1964 to become Warner/Reprise's head art director. Among his design credits for the Warner family of labels were the Jimi Hendrix Experience's Are You Experienced, Van Morrison's Astral Weeks, the Grateful Dead's Anthem of the Sun, the Doobie Brothers' Toulouse Street, Tiny Tim's God Bless Tiny Tim, and Joni Mitchell's Clouds, which set off a trend of musicians creating the artwork for their own record sleeves. In 1973, when Frank Sinatra emerged from retirement with his comeback album, Thrasher shot candid photographs for the cover and also devised the album title Ol' Blue Eyes Is Back, which was widely used to promote Sinatra's return to recording and touring. Besides his work on album covers, Thrasher art-directed many of Warner Bros.' ads and posters from 1964 to 1979.

"Cream Puff War" (1967), the first single by the Grateful Dead. The orange label with chevron border was used on Warner Bros.' American 45s for much of the 1960s.

In 1964, Warner Bros. successfully negotiated with French label Disques Vogue and Warner Bros.' British distributor Pye Records for the rights to distribute Petula Clark's recordings in the US (said rights previously being held by Laurie Records). Clark soon scored a No. 1 US hit with "Downtown". Warner also released other Pye artists in the US market, and, in return, Pye distributed recordings issued by Warner in the UK from 1964 to 1970.

Another significant development in the label's history came in 1966 when Ostin hired young independent producer Lenny Waronker as an A&R manager, beginning a strong and enduring mentor/protegé relationship between the two. Waronker, the son of Liberty Records founder Simon Waronker, had previously worked as an assistant to Liberty producer Snuff Garrett. Later he worked with the small San Francisco label Autumn Records, founded by disc jockeys Tom Donahue, Bobby Mitchell, and Sylvester Stewart (who would soon become famous as a musician under his stage name Sly Stone).

Waronker had been hired as a freelance producer for some of Autumn's acts including the Tikis (who later became Harpers Bizarre), the Beau Brummels, and the Mojo Men, and for these recording sessions he brought in several musician friends who were then becoming established on the L.A. music scene: composer/musicians Randy Newman (a childhood friend), Leon Russell, and Van Dyke Parks. Together they became the foundation of the creative salon that centered on Waronker at Warner Bros. and which, with Ostin's continuing support, became the catalyst for Warner Records' subsequent success as a rock music label. Initially, Waronker looked after the acts that Warner Bros. took over when they bought Autumn Records for $10,000, but during the year he also avidly pursued rising Los Angeles band Buffalo Springfield. Although (much to his and Ostin's chagrin) the band was ultimately signed by Atlantic Records, they eventually became part of the Warner Bros. catalogue after Atlantic was purchased by Warner Bros. Records.

In 1967, Warner Bros. took over Valiant Records, which added hit-making harmony pop group the Association to the Warner roster. This acquisition proved to be another huge money-maker for Warner Bros.; the Association scored a string of major hits in the late 1960s, and their 1967 hit "Never My Love" went on to become the second-most-played song on American radio and TV in the 20th century. During the year, the label also took its first tentative step into the burgeoning rock market when they signed leading San Francisco psychedelic rock group the Grateful Dead. Warner Bros. threw the band a release party at Fugazi Hall in San Francisco's North Beach. During the concert, Warner A&R manager Joe Smith took the stage and announced, "I just want to say what an honor it is to be able to introduce the Grateful Dead and its music to the world," which prompted a cynical Jerry Garcia to quip in reply, "I just want to say what an honor it is for the Grateful Dead to introduce Warner Bros. Records to the world."

Also in 1967, Warner/Reprise established its Canadian operation Warner Reprise Canada Ltd., replacing its distribution deal with the Compo Company. This was the origin of Warner Music Canada.

=== 1967–1969: Warner Bros.-Seven Arts ===
In November 1966 the entire Warner group was taken over by and merged with Seven Arts Productions, a New York-based company owned by Eliot Hyman. Seven Arts specialized in syndicating old movies and cartoons to TV, and had independently produced a number of significant feature films for other studios, including Stanley Kubrick's Lolita, as well as forging a successful production partnership with noted British studio Hammer Films. Hyman's purchase of Jack L. Warner's controlling share of the Warner group for US$32 million stunned the film world—Warner Records executive Joe Smith later quipped that it was

... as if the Pasadena Star-News bought The New York Times. As ludicrous as that."

The newly merged group was renamed Warner Bros.-Seven Arts (often referred to in the trade press by the abbreviation it adopted for its new logo, "W7"). Although Warner Bros. Pictures was faltering, the purchase coincided with a period of tremendous growth in the music industry, and Warner-Reprise was now on its way to becoming a major player in the industry. Hyman's investment banker Alan Hirshfeld, of Charles Allen and Company, urged him to expand the company's record holdings, and arranged a meeting with Jerry Wexler, and Ahmet and Nesuhi Ertegun, co-owners of leading independent label Atlantic Records, which eventually resulted in the purchase of Atlantic in 1968.

In June 1967, Mo Ostin attended the historic Monterey International Pop Festival, where the Association performed the opening set. Ostin had already acquired the US rights to the Jimi Hendrix Experience's recordings, sight unseen, but he was reportedly unimpressed by Hendrix's now-famous performance. During his visit he met Andy Wickham, who had come to Monterey as an assistant to festival promoter Lou Adler. Wickham had worked as a commercial artist in London, followed by a stint with Andrew Loog Oldham's Immediate Records before moving to Los Angeles to work for Adler's Dunhill label. Ostin initially hired Wickham as Warner's "house hippie" on a generous retainer of $200 per week. Hanging out around Laurel Canyon, Wickham scouted for new talent and established a rapport with the young musicians Warner Bros. was seeking to sign. Like Lenny Waronker, Wickham's youth, intelligence and hip attitude allowed him to bridge the "generation gap between these young performers and the older Warner 'establishment'". He played a major role in signing Eric Andersen, Jethro Tull, Van Morrison, and Joni Mitchell (who signed to Reprise), whom Wickham successfully recommended to Ostin in his first week with the company. Over the next thirty years, Wickham became one of Warner's most influential A&R managers, signing such notable acts as Emmylou Harris, Buck Owens, and Norwegian pop trio a-ha.

During this formative period, Warner Bros. made several other notable new signings including Randy Newman and Van Dyke Parks. Newman would not make his commercial breakthrough until the mid-1970s but he achieved a high profile in the industry thanks to songs he wrote that were covered by other acts like Three Dog Night and Alan Price. Although Warner Bros. spent large sums on albums that sold poorly, and there were some missteps in its promotion strategy, the presence of unorthodox acts like the Grateful Dead and critically acclaimed 'cult' performers like Newman and Parks, combined with the artistic freedom that the label afforded them, proved significant in building Warner Bros.' reputation and credibility. Bob Krasnow, who briefly headed Warner Bros.' short-lived 'black' label Loma Records, later commented that the Grateful Dead "were really the springboard. People said, 'Wow, if they'll sign The Dead, they must be going in the right direction.'"

Although not widely known to the general public at that time, Van Dyke Parks was a figure of high repute on the L.A. music scene thanks to his work as a session musician and songwriter (notably with the Byrds and Harper's Bizarre), and especially because of his renowned collaboration with Brian Wilson on the legendary unreleased Beach Boys album Smile. In 1967, Lenny Waronker produced Parks' Warner debut album Song Cycle, which reportedly cost more than $35,000 to record, making it one of the most expensive 'pop' albums ever made up to that time. It sold very poorly despite rave critical reviews, so publicist Stan Cornyn (who had helped the label to sign the Grateful Dead) wrote an infamous tongue-in-cheek advertisement to promote it. The ad cheekily declared that the label had "lost $35,509 on 'the album of the year' (dammit)," suggested that those who had purchased the album had probably worn their copies out by playing it over and over, and made the offer that listeners could send these supposedly worn-out copies back to Warner Bros., who would exchange it for two new copies, including one "to educate a friend with." Incensed by the tactic, Parks accused Cornyn of trying to kill his career. Cornyn encountered similar problems with Joni Mitchell—he penned an advertisement that was meant to convey the message that Mitchell was yet to achieve significant market penetration, but the tag-line "Joni Mitchell is 90% Virgin" reportedly reduced Mitchell to tears, and Cornyn had to withdraw it from publication.

Warner Bros. also struggled with their flagship rock act, the Grateful Dead who, like Peter, Paul and Mary, had negotiated complete artistic control over the recording and packaging of their music. Their debut album had been recorded in just four days, and although it was not a major hit, it cracked the US Top 50 album chart and sold steadily, eventually going gold in 1971. For their second album, the Grateful Dead took a far more experimental approach, embarking on a marathon series of recording sessions lasting seven months, from September 1967 to March 1968. They started the album with David Hassinger, who had produced their first album, but he quit the project in frustration in December 1967 while they were recording in New York City (although he is co-credited with the band on the album). The group and their concert sound engineer Dan Healy then took over production of the album themselves, taking the unusual step of intermixing studio material with multitrack recordings of their concerts. Anthem of the Sun proved to be the least successful of the Grateful Dead's 1960s albums—it sold poorly, the extended sessions put the band more than $100,000 in debt to the label, and Warner Bros. executive Joe Smith later described it as "the most unreasonable project with which we have ever involved ourselves."

The Grateful Dead's relationship with Warner Bros. Records was stretched even further by the making of their third album Aoxomoxoa (1969), which also took around seven months to record and cost $180,000, almost twice as much as its predecessor. It sold poorly and took almost thirty years to be accredited with gold-record status. There were further difficulties in 1971 when the band presented Warner Bros. with a planned live double album that they wanted to call Skull Fuck, but Ostin handled the matter diplomatically. Rather than refusing point-blank to release it, he reminded the Grateful Dead that they were heavily in debt to Warner and would not see any royalties until this had been repaid; he also pointed out that the provocative title would inevitably hurt sales because major retailers like Sears would refuse to stock it. Realizing that this would reduce their income, the band voluntarily changed the title to Grateful Dead, known generally as Skull and Roses.

Some of Warner Bros.' biggest commercial successes during this period were with "Sunshine Pop" acts. Harpers Bizarre scored a No. 13 Billboard hit in April 1967 with their version of Simon & Garfunkel's "The 59th Street Bridge Song (Feelin' Groovy)", and a month later the Association scored a US No. 1 with "Windy", and they reached No. 8 on the album chart with their first Warner Bros. album Insight Out. Their next single "Never My Love" also topped the charts in autumn 1967 (No. 2 Billboard, No. 1 Cashbox), and now ranks as one of the most successful of all Warner Bros. recordings—it became a radio staple and is now accredited by BMI as the second most-played song on US radio in the 20th century, surpassing both "Yesterday" by the Beatles and "Stand by Me" by Ben E. King. The group's 1968 Greatest Hits album was also a major hit, reaching No. 4 on the US album chart. In 1968, Mason Williams' instrumental composition "Classical Gas" reached No. 2 on the Billboard chart, selling more than a million copies, and Williams won three Grammys that year.

Another notable Warner release from this period was Astral Weeks, the second solo album by Van Morrison (his first was on Bang), who signed with the label in 1968. Although it sold relatively poorly on its first release (and did not reach gold record status until 2001), it has been widely acclaimed by musicians and critics worldwide, has featured on many "Best Albums of All Time" lists, and has remained in release almost continuously since 1968.

During 1968, using the profits from Warner/Reprise, W7 purchased Atlantic Records for $17.5 million, including the label's valuable archive, its growing roster of new artists, and the services of its three renowned executives Jerry Wexler, Nesuhi Ertegun and Ahmet Ertegun. However, the purchase again caused rancor among the Warner/Reprise management, who were upset that their hard-won profits had been co-opted to buy Atlantic, and that Atlantic's executives were made large shareholders in Warner-Seven Arts—the deal gave the Ertegun brothers and Wexler between them 66,000 shares of Warner Bros.' common stock.

On June 1, 1968, Billboard announced that Warner Bros. Records' star comedy performer Bill Cosby had turned down a five-year, US$3.5 million contract renewal offer, and would leave the label in August of that year to record for his own Tetragrammaton Records label. Just over one month later (July 13) Billboard reported on a major reorganization of the entire Warner-Seven Arts music division. Mike Maitland was promoted to Executive Vice-president of both the recorded music and publishing operations, and George Lee took over from Victor Blau as operational head of the recording division. The restructure also reversed the reporting arrangement put in place in 1960, and from this point the Warner publishing arm reported to the record division under Maitland. The Billboard article also noted the enormous growth and vital significance of W7's music operations, which were by then providing most of Warner-Seven Arts' revenue—during the first nine months of that fiscal year, the recording and publishing divisions generated 74% of the corporation's total profit, with the publishing division alone accounting for over US$2 million of ASCAP's collections from music users.

=== 1969–1972: Kinney takeover ===
In 1969, Warner Bros.-Seven Arts was taken over by the Kinney National Company, headed by New York businessman Steve J. Ross, who would successfully lead the Warner group of companies until his death in 1992. The US$400 million deal created a new conglomerate that combined the Warner film, television, recording, and music publishing divisions with Kinney's multi-faceted holdings. Ross had founded the company in the late 1950s while working in his family's funeral business—seeing the opportunity to use the company's cars, which were idle at night, he founded a successful car hire operation, which he later merged with the Kinney parking garage company. Ross took the company public in 1962, and from this base it expanded rapidly between 1966 and 1968, merging with National Cleaning Services in 1966 to form the Kinney National Company, and then acquiring a string of companies that would prove of enormous value to the Warner group in the years ahead–National Periodical Publications (which included DC Comics and All American Comics), the Ashley-Famous talent agency, and Panavision.

In the summer of 1969, Atlantic Records agreed to assist Warner Bros. Records in establishing overseas divisions, but when Warner executive Phil Rose arrived in Australia to begin setting up a subsidiary there, he discovered that just one week earlier Atlantic had signed a new four-year production and distribution deal with local label Festival Records without informing Warner Bros.

During 1969, the rivalry between Mike Maitland and Ahmet Ertegun quickly escalated into an all-out executive battle, but Steve Ross favored Ertegun, and the conflict culminated in Maitland being dismissed from his position on January 25, 1970. He declined an offer of a job with Warner Bros. Pictures and left the company, subsequently becoming president of MCA Records. Mo Ostin was appointed president of Warner Bros. Records with Joe Smith as executive vice-president.

In 1970, the 'Seven Arts' name was dropped and the WB shield became the Warner Bros. Records logo again.

=== 1970–1979: The Ostin era ===
Beginning back in 1967 with the signing of the Grateful Dead, Warner Bros. Records and its affiliate labels steadily built up a diverse and prestigious lineup of rock and pop artists through the 1970s, and earning a strong reputation as an "artists first" record company. Under the guidance of Edward West, vice-president of Warner Bros. Records Inc in 1973 and its executives, A&R managers and staff producers, including Mo Ostin, Russ Titelman and ex-Warner Bros. recording artist (with Harpers Bizarre) Ted Templeman, sales grew steadily throughout the decade and by the end of the 1970s Warner Bros. and its sister labels had become one of the world's leading recording groups, with a star-studded roster that included Fleetwood Mac, James Taylor and Alice Cooper. This was augmented by the group's valuable back-catalogue, and lucrative licensing deals with American and international labels including Sire, Vertigo and Island Records (1975–1982) that gave WBR the American distribution rights for leading British and European rock acts including Deep Purple, Jethro Tull and Black Sabbath. Aided by the growth of FM radio and the album oriented rock format, LPs became the primary vehicle of Warner Bros.' sales successes throughout the 1970s, although artists such as the Doobie Brothers and America also scored many major US and international hit singles.

One of the first Warner Bros. albums to achieve both critical and commercial success in the early 1970s was Van Morrison's third solo album Moondance, which consolidated his distinctive blend of rock, jazz and R&B, earned glowing critical praise and sold well—it made the Top 40 album chart in both the US and the UK, the single "Come Running" was a US Top 40 hit (No. 39, Billboard) and the title track became a radio perennial.

British group Black Sabbath were signed to Philips Records' progressive subsidiary Vertigo in their native country. Deep Purple, who recorded for EMI's Parlophone and Harvest labels in England, were originally signed in the US to the independent Tetragrammaton Records, which was distributed by Warner Bros., who acquired the label after it folded in 1970. Black Sabbath's eponymous debut album (recorded in just two days) reached No. 8 on the UK album chart, and No. 23 on the Billboard 200, where it remained for over a year, selling strongly despite some negative reviews. It has since been certified platinum in the US by the Recording Industry Association of America (RIAA) and in the UK by British Phonographic Industry (BPI). Sabbath's second album was to have been called War Pigs, but Warner Bros. Records changed the title to Paranoid fearing a backlash by consumers. It was a Top 10 hit on the US album chart in 1971, and went on to sell four million copies in the US alone with virtually no radio airplay.

By 1970, "Seven Arts" was dropped from the company name and the WB shield became the Warner Bros. Records logo again. During 1972, a financial scandal in its parking operations forced Kinney National to spin off its non-entertainment assets, and the Warner recording, publishing and film divisions then became part of a new umbrella company, Warner Communications.

In July 1970, the Warner recording group acquired another prestige asset with the purchase of Jac Holzman's Elektra Records for US$10 million. Like Atlantic, the new acquisition came with a very valuable back-catalogue, which included the Doors, Love, Paul Butterfield Blues Band, Tim Buckley, the Stooges, MC5 and Bread, but Elektra soon began producing more major hits under the Warner umbrella. Recent signing Carly Simon scored two successive Top 20 singles in 1971 with "That's the Way I've Always Heard It Should Be" and "Anticipation", and her first two albums both made the Billboard Top 50, but the following year she topped the single and album charts with her international smash hit "You're So Vain" and the album No Secrets, which both went to No. 1 in the US. Jac Holzman ran the label until 1972, when he was succeeded by David Geffen and Elektra was merged with Geffen's label Asylum Records. Geffen was forced to step down in 1975 for health reasons and Joe Smith was appointed president in his place, although the label's fortunes subsequently waned considerably, with Elektra-Asylum reportedly losing some $27 million during the last two years of Smith's tenure.

With three co-owned record companies, the next step was the formation of the group's in-house distribution arm, initially called Kinney Records Distributing Corporation, to better control distribution of product and make sure records by breaking new acts were available.

In 1971, UK-based pop rock trio America were signed to the recently established British division of Warner Bros. Their debut album, released late in the year, at first enjoyed only moderate success, but in early 1972 their single "A Horse with No Name" became a major international hit, reaching No. 1 in the US. Warner hastily reissued the album with the song included and it too became a huge hit, reaching No. 1 on the US album chart and eventually earning a platinum record award. Although criticized for their similarity to Neil Young (indeed, rumors circulated around Hollywood that Young had cut the track anonymously), America scored five more US Top 10 singles over the next three years, including a second US No. 1 with "Sister Golden Hair" in 1975. Their albums performed very strongly in the charts—each of their first seven albums were US Top 40 albums, five of these made the Top 10 and all but one (Hat Trick, 1973) achieved either gold or platinum status. Their 1975 Greatest Hits album became a perennial seller and is now accredited at 4× platinum.

In 1972, Dionne Warwick was signed to Warner Bros. Records after leaving Scepter Records in what was the biggest contract at the time for a female recording artist, although her five years at Warner Bros. were relatively unsuccessful in comparison to her spectacular hit-making tenure at Scepter.

After a slow start, the Doobie Brothers proved to be one of Warner Bros.' most successful signings. Their debut album made little impact but their second album Toulouse Street (1972) reached No. 21 and spawned two US Top 40 singles, "Listen to the Music" and "Jesus is Just Alright", inaugurating a string of hit albums and singles over the next five years. Their third album The Captain and Me was even more successful, reaching No. 7 in the US and producing two more hit singles, "China Grove" (#15) and "Long Train Runnin'" (#8); it became a consistent seller and is now accredited 2× Platinum by the RIAA. What Were Once Vices Are Now Habits (1974) reached No. 4 and produced two more hits including their first US No. 1 single "Black Water" (1975). Stampede also reached No. 4, and produced another hit single with the Motown cover "Take Me in Your Arms (Rock Me a Little While)" (US #11).

Warner Bros. Records' reputation for nurturing new artists was demonstrated by the career of Alice Cooper (originally the name of the band, but later taken over as the stage name / persona of singer and main songwriter Vince Furnier). The Alice Cooper band recorded two unsuccessful albums for Frank Zappa's Warner-distributed label Straight Records before teaming with producer Bob Ezrin, who became a longtime collaborator. Their third LP Love it to Death (originally released on Straight and later reissued on Warner Bros.) reached No. 35 on the Billboard album chart and produced the hit single "I'm Eighteen", which reached No. 21. Following the runaway success of their 1971 European tour Warner Bros. Records offered the band a multi-album contract; their first Warner Bros. album Killer sold well, with the single "Halo of Flies" making the Top 10 in the Netherlands, but it was their next album School's Out (1972) that really put them on the map. The title song was a Top 10 hit in the US, reached No. 1 in the UK and became a radio staple, and the album went to No. 2 in the US and sold more than a million copies. Billion Dollar Babies (1973) became their biggest success, going to No. 1 in both the US and the UK. The follow-up Muscle of Love (1973) was less successful, although the single "Teenage Lament '74 was a Top 20 hit in the UK. Furnier split from the band in 1974 and signed to Warner Bros.' sister label, Atlantic as a solo artist, scoring further success with his solo albums and singles.

In 1973, Frank Zappa and manager Herb Cohen closed the Straight and Bizarre labels and established a new imprint, DiscReet Records, retaining their distribution deal with Warner Bros. Zappa's next album Apostrophe (') (1973) became the biggest commercial success of his career, reaching No. 10 on the Billboard album chart, and the single "Don't Eat the Yellow Snow" was a minor hit and (at the time) his only single to make the Hot 100 chart. Zappa also enjoyed moderate commercial success with the live double album Roxy and Elsewhere (1974) and his next studio album One Size Fits All (1975), both of which reached the Top 30 on the Billboard album chart.

The Warner Bros. "Burbank" picture label introduced in 1973. It was later modified when a banner was added across the WB Shield, on which the word "RECORDS" was inscribed.

WBR introduced a new label design for its LPs and singles in mid-1973. This design, which WBR would use until mid-1978, featured a multi-colored, idealized watercolor painting of a Burbank street lined by palms and eucalypts, and titled with the slogan "Burbank, Home of Warner Bros. Records" around the label's top perimeter. According to the company's official history, the design was copied from a similarly styled "orange crate art" fruit company label illustration created by an unknown commercial artist in the 1920s.

After several years as a 'cult' artist, Randy Newman achieved his first significant commercial success as a solo artist with his 1974 album Good Old Boys which made the Top 40. His controversial 1977 single "Short People" was one of the surprise hits of the year, reaching No. 2 on the Billboard Hot 100. On October 12, 1974, WBR and Phil Spector established Warner-Spector Records, but the label was short-lived and folded in 1977; most of its releases were reissues Philles Records recordings from the 1960s and the only new material released was two singles by the disco group Calhoon and a single by Cher.

In 1975 David Geffen was obliged to leave the company for health reasons, after being told that he had a terminal illness (although this later proved to be a false diagnosis). In his place, Joe Smith was promoted to become President of the combined Elektra/Asylum label. At this time Warner Bros. began to wind down the Reprise label. In 1976–77 almost all Reprise acts, including Fleetwood Mac, Gordon Lightfoot, Ry Cooder and Michael Franks were transferred to Warner Bros., leaving only Neil Young (who refused to move) and founder Frank Sinatra. Apart from these artists and some reissues, the Reprise label was dormant until it was reactivated in 1986 with the issue of the Dream Academy's single "The Love Parade" on Reprise 28750.

By far the most successful of the Reprise acts who moved to Warner Bros. was Fleetwood Mac, whose massive success firmly established Warner Bros. in the front rank of major labels—although few would have predicted it from the band's tumultuous history. Between 1970 and 1975 there were multiple lineup changes (with only two original members remaining by 1974), their album sales declined drastically, and a legal battle over the group's name kept them off the road for over a year. However, just as Fleetwood Mac was switching labels in 1975, the group re-invigorated by the recruitment of new members Lindsey Buckingham and Stevie Nicks. The 'new' Fleetwood Mac scored a string of US and international hits and their self-titled Reprise debut album was a huge success, reaching No. 1 in the US, charting for more than 30 weeks and selling more than 5 million copies. In 1977, their now-legendary Rumours took both group and Warner Bros. label to even greater heights—it generated a string of international hit singles and became the most successful album in the label's history; it is currently ranked the 11th biggest selling album of all time and as of 2009 was estimated to have sold more than 40 million copies.

After a string of albums with the Faces and as a solo artist for Mercury Records in the early 1970s, British singer Rod Stewart signed with Warner Bros. in 1974, applied for American citizenship and moved to the US. Launching a sustained run of success, his Warner debut album Atlantic Crossing (1975) was a major international hit, reaching No. 9 on the Billboard album chart and No. 1 in Australia, with the single "I Don't Want to Talk About It" going to No. 1 in the UK. His second WBR album A Night on the Town (1976) went to No. 2 in the US and No. 1 in Australia and produced three US Top 40 singles, including his first US No. 1 "Tonight's the Night". Foot Loose & Fancy Free (1977) reached No. 2 on the Billboard Pop Albums chart and No. 1 in Australia and again produced three US Top 40 singles, including "You're in My Heart (The Final Acclaim)", which reached No. 4. Blondes Have More Fun (1978) went to No. 1 in the US and Australia, and produced two more Top 40 singles including his second US No. 1, "Da Ya Think I'm Sexy?" (although Stewart and co-writer Carmine Appice were later successfully sued for plagiarizing the song's catchy melody hook from "Taj Mahal" by Brazilian songwriter Jorge Ben). Stewart's Greatest Hits collection (1979) went to No. 1 in the UK and Australia, giving the singer a record-breaking five consecutive No. 1 albums in the latter country.

Warner Bros. Records also had unexpected success in the mid-1970s with another 'heritage' act, veteran vocal group the Four Seasons. In early 1975, they signed with Curb Records (which was distributed by WBR) just as lead singer Frankie Valli scored a surprise hit with his independently released solo single "My Eyes Adored You". Soon after, Valli and The Four Seasons burst back onto the charts with the disco-styled "Who Loves You", which reached No. 3 in the US and sold more than a million copies, and the album Who Loves You sold more than 1 million copies. Their next single "December 1963 (Oh, What a Night)" topped the charts in both Britain and the US in early 1976, becoming the group's first US No. 1 since 1967. A remixed version was a hit again in 1994 and its total of 54 weeks in charts gives it the longest tenure of any song on the Billboard Hot 100.

By the time of the Doobie Brothers 1976 album Takin' It to the Streets, founding member Tom Johnston had effectively left the band and he was replaced by former Steely Dan session man Michael McDonald, whose distinctive voice helped to propel the group to even greater success. The new album sold strongly, reaching No. 8 in the US, and the title track reached No. 13 on the Billboard Hot 100, becoming a perennial on radio playlists. Warner Bros. also released the massively successful Best of the Doobies (1976), which has become one of the biggest-selling albums of all time and is currently accredited at 10× Platinum status. 1978's Minute by Minute marked the peak of their career—both the album and its lead single "What A Fool Believes" went to No. 1 in the US and the album's title track also made the US Top 20, although it was their last album with founding drummer John Hartman and long-serving guitarist Jeff "Skunk" Baxter.

During the late 1970s, Warner Bros.' reputation as an "artists first" label was challenged by a bitter and long-running dispute with Frank Zappa. In 1976, Zappa's relationship with manager Herb Cohen ended in litigation. For Zoot Allures, Zappa took his own copy of the master directly to Warner Bros. Records, who agreed to release the album, therefore bypassing Cohen and DiscReet. However, Warner Bros. changed their position following legal action from Cohen. Zappa was then obligated to deliver four more albums to Warner Bros. for release on DiscReet. Zappa sequenced a double live album and three studio albums, but Warner Bros. objected to some or all of these recordings and refused to reimburse Zappa for production costs, as required by the DiscReet distribution contract. Zappa then re-edited the material into a 4-LP set called Läther (pronounced 'leather'), made a deal with Phonogram, and scheduled the release of Läther for Halloween 1977. However, Warner Bros. threatened legal action, forcing Zappa to shelve the release. Infuriated, Zappa hosted a broadcast on KROQ-FM in Pasadena, California, where he played the entire Läther album in sequence, repeatedly criticizing Warner Bros., and openly encouraging listeners to record the broadcast. Warner Bros. took further legal action against Zappa, which prevented him from issuing any material for over a year. During 1978 and 1979, Warner Bros. issued the disputed material over four albums – Zappa in New York (an edited and censored version of the original 1977 live double album), Studio Tan, Sleep Dirt and Orchestral Favorites. Zappa eventually won the rights to his Straight, Bizarre, DiscReet and Warner Bros. material, but remained trenchantly critical of his treatment by Warner Bros. for the rest of his life. Zappa's recordings were subsequently reissued on CD by Rykodisc (ironically it was later acquired by Warner Music), including Läther, which appeared posthumously in 1996.

Ry Cooder was another Reprise act who was transferred to Warner Bros. in 1977. His first Warner release was the 1977 live album Showtime and he remained with the label until his contract expired in the late 1980s. His 1979 album Bop 'Til You Drop is notable as the first major-label rock album to be digitally recorded, and it became the best-selling album of his career.

Thanks to its distribution deal with Curb Records, WBR scored the biggest hit single in the company's history in 1977. The ballad "You Light Up My Life" (written and produced by Joe Brooks) was originally recorded by the late Kasey Cisyk for the soundtrack to the film of the same name, in which actress Didi Conn lip-synched to Cisyk's recording. Teenager Debby Boone (daughter of actor-singer Pat Boone) was recruited to record a new version for the single release, and it became a massive success, topping the Billboard Hot 100 for a record-setting 10 consecutive weeks and earning platinum certification from the RIAA. It became the most successful single of the 1970s in the United States, setting a new record for the longest run at No. 1 in the US and surpassing Elvis Presley's "Hound Dog". Boone's success also earned her Grammy nominations for "Best Female Pop Vocal Performance " and "Record of the Year" and won her the 1977 Grammy for "Best New Artist" and the 1977 American Music Award for "Favorite Pop Single". The song also earned Joe Brooks the 1977 "Song of the Year" Grammy (tied with "Evergreen (Love Theme from A Star Is Born)") as well as "Best Original Song" at both the 1977 Golden Globe and Academy Awards.

Throughout the 1970s, Warner Bros. also benefited from its US/Canada distribution deals with independent labels such as Straight Records, DiscReet Records, UK labels Chrysalis (1972–1976) and Island (1974–1982), Bizarre Records, Bearsville Records (1970–1984) and Geffen Records (which was sold to MCA in 1990).

Although primarily associated with mainstream white acts in the Seventies, Warner Bros.' distribution deals with smaller labels also brought it some success in the disco, soul and funk genres in the late 1970s and early 1980s. Among the imprints it distributed that were notable in these fields were Seymour Stein's Sire Records (which Warner Bros. soon purchased), Curtis Mayfield's Curtom, Norman Whitfield's Whitfield Records, Quincy Jones' Qwest, Prince's Paisley Park, RFC Records (formed in December 1978 when Ray Caviano became the executive director of Warner's disco division), and Tom Silverman's Tommy Boy Records (another label Warner Bros. eventually took over).

Until the late 1970s, Warner Bros. itself still had very few Black artists on its roster, but this began to change with the signing of artists such as George Benson and Prince. Benson had risen to prominence in jazz in the 1960s but was still relatively little-known by the general public. However, his move to Warner Bros. in 1976 and the teaming with producer Tommy LiPuma enabled him to straddle genres and made him a popular and highly successful mainstream R&B and pop artist. His first Warner Bros. album Breezin' (1976) became one of the most successful jazz albums of the decade and a major 'crossover' hit—it topped the American Pop, R&B and Jazz album charts and produced two hit singles, the title track (which became a Jazz standard and a radio favorite) and "This Masquerade", which was a Top 10 pop and R&B hit. Benson enjoyed enormous success with his subsequent Warner albums. All of his Warner albums made the Top 20 on the US jazz album chart and beginning with Breezin', he scored seven consecutive US No. 1 jazz albums; the first five of these were also Top 20 hits on both the Pop and R&B charts. His live version of Leiber & Stoller's "On Broadway" (from his 1978 live album Weekend in L.A.) outcharted the original version by the Drifters, reaching No. 7 on the Billboard Hot 100, and gained further exposure thanks to its memorable use in the famous audition sequence in Bob Fosse's 1979 film All That Jazz. Benson's most successful single "Give Me the Night" (1980) became his first US No. 1 R&B hit, reached No. 4 on the Pop chart and also reached No. 2 on the Hot Disco Singles chart.

Prince signed to Warner Bros. in 1977. His first album For You had little impact, although the single "Soft and Wet" reached No. 12 on the Billboard R&B chart. His second self-titled album (1979) fared considerably better, reaching No. 3 on the R&B album chart and earning a gold record award; the first single lifted from the album, "I Wanna Be Your Lover" became Prince's first crossover hit, reaching No. 1 on the R&B chart and No. 11 on the main pop chart, while the follow-up single "Why You Wanna Treat Me So Bad?" reached No. 13 on the R&B chart. Although he was still little known outside the US at this stage, this early success set the stage for his major commercial breakthrough in the 1980s.

Another valuable late 1970s discovery was metal-pop band Van Halen, who were spotted at a Hollywood club by Mo Ostin and Ted Templeman in 1977. Their self-titled debut album was a notable success, reaching No. 19 on the Billboard album chart, and their second album Van Halen II (1979) reached No. 6 and produced their first hit single "Dance the Night Away" (#19).

Warner Bros. also began to tentatively embrace the burgeoning new wave movement in the late 1970s, signing cult bands Devo and the B-52s. A crucial acquisition in this field—and one which would soon prove to be of enormous importance to the company—was the New York-based Sire Records, founded in 1966 by Seymour Stein and Richard Gottehrer. Warner Bros. took over Sire's distribution from ABC Records in 1977 and bought the label in 1978, retaining Stein as its president. The addition of the Sire roster gave Warner Bros. an important foothold in this area; Stein is often credited with naming the genre to replace the term "punk", which he disliked. Sire's American signings included the Ramones, the Dead Boys, and Talking Heads and most importantly of all, Madonna, who soon became the most successful female artist in music history, earning billions for Warner. Sire's distribution deals with British independent labels including Mute, Rough Trade, Korova and Fiction gave WEA the American rights to important UK-based New Wave bands including Depeche Mode, the Smiths, the Beat, Madness, Echo & the Bunnymen, and the Cure. Into the 1990s, the label had continued success with Seal, k.d. lang, Tommy Page, Ice-T, and Ministry.

In the late 1970s, Warner Bros. also scored mainstream pop hits with singer/actor Shaun Cassidy—his version of "Da Doo Ron Ron" went to No. 1 in the US in 1977, his next two singles (both penned by Eric Carmen) were US Top 10 hits and Cassidy was nominated for a Grammy award. As the decade drew to a close, there were more breakthroughs with new acts. Rickie Lee Jones' self-titled debut album went to No. 3 in the US, No. 1 in Australia and No. 18 in the UK and produced two hit singles, "Chuck E.'s In Love" (US #4) and "Young Blood" (US #40). Thanks to its American distribution deal with Vertigo, British group Dire Straits provided another sustained run of hit albums and singles in the late 1970s and 1980s. Their eponymous debut album (1978) was a surprise international hit, going to No. 2 in the US and earning a gold record award from the RIAA, while the single "Sultans of Swing" went to No. 4 in the US. Their second album Communiqué (1979) made the Top 20 in many countries and earned another gold record award in the US WBR also enjoyed renewed success with comedy recordings in this period, transferring Richard Pryor from Reprise and signing rising star Steve Martin, whose second Warner album A Wild and Crazy Guy (1978) became one of the label's biggest comedy hits—it reached No. 2 on the pop album chart, won the 1979 Grammy for 'Best Comedy Album', and Martin's novelty single, "King Tut" was a US Top 20 hit.

In the 1970s there were different systems for four-channel stereo. Warner Records and the whole WEA group chose JVC's and RCA's discrete system called CD-4 or Quadradisc. That was the system with the highest separation between the four channel, but the system needed a special stylus that could read frequences up to 48 000 Hz.

=== 1980–1988 ===
The 1980s was a period of unprecedented success for Warner Bros. Records. The golden decade began with the success of singer-songwriter Christopher Cross, whose self-titled debut album went to No. 6 in the US and produced four charting singles, including the No. 1 hit "Sailing". He also won five major categories at the 1981 Grammy Awards, becoming the only solo artist to date to win the "Big Four" awards in one year (Record, Song and Album of the Year, and Best New Artist) while his performance of "Arthur's Theme" from the Dudley Moore film Arthur, which also went to No. 1, won both the Oscar and the Golden Globe award for Best Original Song.

Warner Bros. scored an apparent coup in 1980 by luring Paul Simon away from Columbia Records. His first Warner album was One Trick Pony (1980), which accompanied the movie of the same name, which Simon wrote and starred in. The single "Late in the Evening" was a major hit (#6) but the album was not a big seller. His next album, Hearts and Bones (1983) was well received by critics but neither it nor the lead single "Allergies" made the chart and Simon's career took a nosedive and it was several more years before the label's patience eventually paid off.

After two moderate-selling albums that established them as one of the most original American new wave bands of the period, DEVO broke through to mainstream success in 1980 with their third album Freedom of Choice which reached No. 22 in the US. Thanks to its quirky music video, which was put on high rotation on MTV, the single "Whip It" reached No. 14 on the Billboard pop chart, becoming the group's biggest American hit. Their follow-up EP DEV-O Live (1981) was a surprise hit in Australia, topping the singles chart there for three weeks, but their subsequent albums and singles suffered from declining sales and the group was eventually dropped by the label after their 1984 album Shout.

Prince's 1980 album Dirty Mind was widely praised by critics, earning a gold record award, but his 1982 double-LP 1999 (1982) became his first major hit album, selling over six million copies and spawning three hit singles. The title track reached No. 12 in the US and provided his first international hit (#25 UK) and his next two singles, "Little Red Corvette" and "Delirious", were both US Top 10 hits.

Chicago was picked up by Warner Bros. in 1981 after being dropped by its former label Columbia, which believed that the band was no longer commercially viable. After teaming with producer David Foster, the band shot back into the charts in 1982 with the album Chicago 16, which reached No. 9 and produced two hit singles including the US No. 1 hit "Hard To Say I'm Sorry". The group's second Warner album, Chicago 17, became the biggest seller of its career—it reached No. 4 in the US and produced four US Top-20 singles including the Top-5 hits "Hard Habit to Break" (#3) and "You're the Inspiration" (#3) and is currently accredited at 6× Platinum. Lead singer Peter Cetera left the group after this album but had continued success as a solo artist for Warner, scoring a No. 1 hit in 1986 with "Glory of Love" (from the movie The Karate Kid Part II), which was also nominated for a Grammy Award, a Golden Globe Award, and an Academy Award. His second solo album sold more than a million copies and produced another No. 1 hit, "The Next Time I Fall". His third solo album produced the Top 5 hit "One Good Woman" (1988) and "After All" reached No. 6.

Lenny Waronker took over as President of WBR in 1982, and his first act was to sign Elvis Costello. Costello's first Warner album Spike featured his biggest American single, the Paul McCartney collaboration "Veronica", which was a US Top 20 hit. He recorded three more critically praised albums for Warner Bros., Mighty Like A Rose, Brutal Youth, and All This Useless Beauty, but he was dropped from the label after the major corporate shakeup in the mid-1990s.

After the end of his contract with RSO Records and Polydor, Eric Clapton signed with Warner Bros. in 1982. His first WBR album, Money and Cigarettes (1983), reached No. 16 on the Billboard album chart, and the single "I've Got a Rock 'n' Roll Heart" reached No. 18 on the Billboard Hot 100. His next album Behind the Sun also fared well, reaching No. 34 and the hit single "Forever Man" went to No. 26, but he transferred to Reprise for his next release.

Another resurgent 1970s act who scored major success with Warner Bros. in this period was ZZ Top, which had previously been signed to London Records. During an extended break in the late 1970s the group gained ownership of its London recordings and signed with Warner Bros., which also re-issued the band's back-catalogue. The group's first two Warner albums Deguello (1979) and El Loco (1981) were moderately successful, but Eliminator (1983) became a major hit thanks to strong support for its music videos on MTV. The band scored three US hit singles including "Legs" (US #8), while the album reached No. 9 on the Billboard 200 and sold in huge numbers, earning a Diamond record award in 1996. Afterburner (ZZ Top album) (1985) went to No. 4 and produced five hit singles, including "Sleeping Bag" (#8).

Sire artist Madonna shot to international prominence with her 1983 self-titled debut album and her first mainstream hit single "Holiday", which reached No. 16 in the US and became a hit in many other countries, including Australia and the UK, where it was Top 5. The album made the Top 20 in more than a dozen countries including the US, where it has been certified at 5× Platinum status. It was quickly followed by Like a Virgin, which became her first US No. 1 album and has sold more than 21 million copies worldwide. The title track was also a huge international hit, going to No. 1 in Australia, Canada, Japan and the US. Boosted by her well-received role in the film Desperately Seeking Susan, "Crazy For You" (1985) became her second US No. 1 hit, and the follow-up "Material Girl" reached No. 2 in the US and was Top 5 in many other countries.

Prince's hugely successful 1984 film and album Purple Rain cemented his stardom, selling more than thirteen million copies in the US (25 million worldwide) and spending twenty-four consecutive weeks at number one on the Billboard 200 chart, while the Purple Rain film won the Academy Award for "Best Original Song Score" and grossed more than $80 million in the US. Singles from the album became hits on pop charts around the world; "When Doves Cry" and "Let's Go Crazy" both reached No. 1 and the title track reached No. 2 on the Billboard Hot 100. However, the sexually explicit album track "Darling Nikki" generated a major controversy that had lasting effects—when politician's wife Tipper Gore heard her 12-year-old daughter listening to the song and investigated the lyrics, her outrage led to the formation of the conservative lobby group Parents Music Resource Center. Their stance was vehemently opposed by former Warner Bros. artist Frank Zappa and others, but the PMRC's political clout eventually forced the US recording industry to adopt the compulsory practice of placing a "Parental Advisory: Explicit Lyrics" sticker on records deemed to contain "offensive" content.

1984 also saw Van Halen break into the big league with the single "Jump" (their only US No. 1 hit) and the album 1984; it was a huge seller (earning Diamond album status in 1999) and reached No. 2 in the US, producing two more Top 20 hits. However, escalating friction between guitarist Eddie Van Halen and lead singer David Lee Roth reached breaking point soon after the album's release and Roth left the band, to be replaced by Sammy Hagar, who recorded for WB as part of Montrose; 1984 was also the last time they worked with Ted Templeman, who had produced all their albums up to this point.

In 1985, Dire Straits' single "Money for Nothing" gained massive exposure on MTV thanks to its innovative computer-animated music video, propelling the single to No. 1 in the US. They scored two more US Top 20 hits with "Walk of Life" and "So Far Away" and the album Brothers in Arms was a phenomenal success—it went to No. 1 in the US, Australia and most European countries and sold in colossal numbers—by 1996 it had been certified at 9× platinum in the US and it is currently ranked at No. 25 in the list of best-selling albums of all time, with sales of more than 30 million copies worldwide.

The new incarnation of Van Halen bounced back in 1986, releasing the enormously successful 5150 album which went to No. 1 and produced two hit singles, "Why Can't This Be Love" (US #3) and "Dreams" (#22). Their three subsequent studio albums (OU812, For Unlawful Carnal Knowledge, and Balance) all reached No. 1 and the band scored 17 US Top 20 singles, including 1988's "When It's Love" (US #5), but their overall sales gradually declined, with each album selling less than its predecessor.

The same was true of Prince; he scored numerous hit albums and singles through the latter half of the 1980s, but his record sales declined and Warner Bros. executives became increasingly concerned that he was producing far more material than they could release. His image was also tarnished by the failure of his later film ventures, his embarrassing refusal to participate in the recording of "We Are The World" and his sacking of guitarist Wendy Melvoin and long-serving keyboard player Lisa Coleman. The 1985 album Around the World in a Day held the No. 1 spot on the Billboard 200 for three weeks and peaked at No. 5 in the UK, selling seven million copies despite minimal promotion. Parade (1986) served as the soundtrack for Prince's second film Under the Cherry Moon; although the movie was a critical and commercial failure, the album peaked at No. 3 in Billboard and No. 2 on the R&B album charts and his classic single "Kiss" was another big international hit, going to No. 1 in the US and becoming a radio staple.

Prince's next project had a long and complex evolution, beginning as a proposed concept double-album called Dream Factory; Prince then proposed a solo album which he intended to issue under the pseudonym Camille, but he eventually combined elements from both to create the ambitious three-album set Crystal Ball. However, because of the relatively lower sales of his previous albums, Prince's manager Steve Fargnoli and Warner Bros. president Mo Ostin both doubted the commercial viability of releasing a 3-LP set, and after previewing Crystal Ball, Ostin insisted that Prince pare it down to two records. Prince at first refused and a battle of wills ensued for several weeks, but he eventually backed down and removed seven tracks; the resulting double-album was released in March 1987 as Sign o' the Times. Despite Prince's bitterness over its forced reduction, it was very successful, peaking at No. 6 on the Billboard 200 albums chart and selling 5 million copies, while the title single "Sign o' the Times" reached No. 3 on the Hot 100. The follow-up single "If I Was Your Girlfriend" flopped (although it went to No. 12 on R&B chart) but he scored big hits with the next two singles, "U Got the Look" (#2 Hot 100, #11 R&B) and "I Could Never Take the Place of Your Man" (#10 Hot 100, #14 R&B).

In 1985, the company collaborated with View-Master to start out a children's video series Kidsongs, which were produced by Together Again Productions, and Warner Music Video handling distribution of the video product, designed for the educational market.

1986–87 took Warner Bros. to even greater heights. Madonna's 1986 album True Blue produced three US number one hits and two top five singles, and the album topped the charts in more than 28 countries (a feat that earned her a place in the Guinness Book of Records); the album has sold over 25 million copies to date. After several years of career stagnation, Paul Simon burst back onto the music scene in late 1986 with Graceland. Warner Bros. were initially anxious about the commercial appeal of Simon's innovative fusion of rock with African styles but the album was a resounding success, topping the charts in many countries, reaching No. 3 in the US and producing two US Top 20 singles. It became the best-selling American album of 1987 and the most successful of Simon's solo career, selling more than 5 million copies, and winning the 1986 Grammy for 'Album of the Year'; the title track also won 'Song of the Year' in 1987. In jazz, Warner Bros. scored another artistic coup by signing jazz legend Miles Davis after his break with longtime label Columbia. His comeback album Tutu (1986) was a major crossover hit, gaining rave reviews and winning a Grammy in 1987. Also in 1986, smooth jazz pioneer Bob James moved to the label after a nine-year stint with Tappan Zee Records/Columbia, producing albums for Warner Bros. for the next sixteen years. The label would additionally reissue some of his back catalogue on CTI and Tappan Zee/Columbia in the mid-1990s.

In the summer of 1986, Warner Bros. announced the reactivation of Reprise Records with its own separate promotions department, and former Warner Bros. Vice President of Promotion Richard Fitzgerald was appointed as label Vice President.

During 1987, Prince recorded a pared-down funk album, The Black Album, but he withdrew it in December just before it was to be released (even though 500,000 copies had been printed). Its hastily recorded replacement Lovesexy (1988) was a moderate success, reaching No. 11 on the Billboard album chart although it reached No. 1 in the UK. However, he rebounded in 1989 with the soundtrack for the hugely successful Batman film, which sold more than eleven million copies, reached No. 1 on the Billboard album chart and produced four hit singles including "Batdance", which topped both the Hot 100 and R&B charts.

Like fellow Athens, Georgia natives the B-52s, R.E.M. was a 'cult' band that gradually built up a strong following in the US and internationally during the 1980s (thanks in part to their innovative music videos). For most of the 1980s they were signed to the independent label IRS Records and in 1987, they broke out to mainstream success with the album Document, their first to sell more than one million copies. However, they were frustrated by IRS's poor international distribution and when their IRS contract expired in 1988 they signed with Warner Bros. Their Warner debut Green established them as a major force, earning a platinum album and selling more than 4 million copies worldwide, and "Stand" became their first US hit single.

In 1989, after an extended period of inactivity following the death of guitarist and main writer Ricky Wilson, the B-52s shot back to prominence with the album Cosmic Thing. It was a Top 5 hit in the US (#4) and the UK (#2) and went to No. 1 in Australia, where the group had enjoyed a strong following since their debut single "Rock Lobster"; they also scored three consecutive hit singles with "Love Shack" (#3 US, #1 Australia), "Roam" (US #3) and "Deadbeat Club" (US #30).

In early 1989, Madonna signed an endorsement deal with Pepsi, and debuted her new single "Like a Prayer" in a commercial titled "Make a Wish"—the first time a pop single had debuted in an advertisement and the first time such a commercial was given a worldwide satellite premiere. The actual music video for "Like a Prayer" premiered on MTV the following day; it generated heated criticism due to its provocative use of religious imagery and was condemned by the Vatican. As a result, Pepsi withdrew the advertisement and canceled the endorsement deal, although Madonna was allowed to retain her US$5 million advance. The controversy also introduced heightened interest in the single and the album (also titled Like a Prayer). The single became Madonna's seventh US number one hit, as well as topping the chart in more than 30 other countries, and the album has sold fifteen million copies worldwide.

=== 1989–2004: The Time Warner era ===
In 1989 Time Inc. acquired Warner Communications and merged the two enterprises to create Time Warner in a deal valued at US$14 billion.

After a long period of relative stability that was notable in the cutthroat American music industry, the death of Steve Ross in late 1992 marked the start of a period of major upheaval at Warner Bros. Records.

R.E.M.'s second Warner album Out of Time (1991) consolidated their success, topping the charts in both the US and the UK and producing two major hit singles: "Losing My Religion" became their biggest American single (#4 on Billboard Hot 100) and a hit in numerous other countries, and "Shiny Happy People", a Top 10 hit in both the US and the UK; the group also won three categories at that year's Grammy Awards.

Prince's fortunes in the Nineties were mixed; he scored more hits and renewed his contract in 1992, but his relationship with Warner Bros. Records soon soured, climaxing in a highly publicized legal battle and his eventual departure from the label. Although his fourth film, Graffiti Bridge was panned by critics and bombed at the box office the album of the same name was very successful—it reached No. 6 on both the Billboard Hot 200 and R&B album chart and produced two US Top 20 singles. Diamonds and Pearls (1991) became one of the biggest albums of his career, selling 9 million records, reaching No. 3 in the US, No. 2 in the UK and No. 1 in Australia, with five of the six singles lifted from the album becoming hits in the US and other countries, including "Cream", which became his fifth US No. 1.

Prince was appointed a vice-president of Warner Bros. Records when he re-signed with them in 1992, but soon regretted his decision. His next album—identified by the cryptic symbol on the cover later defined as "The Love Symbol"—was another solid hit, peaking at No. 5 on the Billboard 200 and selling 5 million copies worldwide, but by now tensions were increasing. Warner Bros. wanted to release "7" as his next single, but Prince successfully pushed for "My Name Is Prince" and it was only a minor hit (#36 Hot 100, #23 R&B); the follow-up "Sexy MF" was censored in the US because of the expletive in the chorus and did not even make the US Top 50 although it was a Top 5 hit in the UK and Australia. When eventually released, "7" became the only major US hit lifted from the album, peaking (appropriately) at No. 7.

Following the 3-disc compilation The Hits/The B-Sides (1993), Prince stopped using his first name and started using only the "Love Symbol"—a decision that drew considerable ridicule from the media. Because this sign has no verbal equivalent, he was often derisively referred to as "The Artist Formerly Known as Prince". By 1994, relations between The Artist and his record label had reached an impasse—in February WEA cancelled its distribution deal with Paisley Park, effectively putting the label out of business. Although released by an independent distributor, his next single "The Most Beautiful Girl in the World" (1994) reached No. 3 in the US and topped the singles charts throughout Europe, becoming the biggest hit single of his career.

Prince had meanwhile prepared two new albums, Come and The Gold Experience; an early version of Come was rejected but Warner Bros. eventually accepted both albums, although they refused to issue them simultaneously. By this time Prince had launched a legal action to terminate his contract and gain ownership of his master recordings, and he publicized his views by appearing in public with the word "SLAVE" written across his right cheek. Come (1994) was moderately successful in the US (#15, gold record) and the single "Letitgo" reached No. 10 on the R&B chart, although the album was a major hit in the UK, debuting at No. 1. In November Warner released a limited edition of The Black Album, but it was already widely bootlegged, sold poorly and was soon deleted. The Gold Experience (1995) was hailed by some reviewers as Prince's best effort since Sign o' the Times; it included "The Most Beautiful Girl in the World" and produced two other charting singles, "I Hate U" (US #11 and "Gold" UK #10). Prince's remarkable career with Warner Bros. ended with Chaos and Disorder (1996), compiled expressly to end his contract. It was one of his least successful releases but still managed to reach No. 26 in the US and No. 14 in the UK and produced one minor hit, "Dinner With Delores" (#36 UK). Prince subsequently released recordings on his own NPG label (via EMI) before eventually signing with Universal Music in 2005.

R.E.M.'s Automatic for the People (1992) cemented their status as one of the top bands of the period and was the most successful album of their career, reaching No. 1 in the UK and No. 2 in the US, selling more than 10 million copies worldwide and generating three US hit singles, "Drive", "Man on the Moon", and "Everybody Hurts".

During 1992 WBR faced one of the most serious controversies in its history over the provocative recording "Cop Killer" from the self titled album by Body Count, a rap metal band led by Ice-T. Unfortunately for Warner Bros., the song (which mentions the Rodney King case) came out just before the controversial acquittal of the police charged with King's beating, which sparked the 1992 Los Angeles Riots and the confluence of events put the song under the national spotlight. Complaints escalated over the summer—conservative police associations called for a boycott of Time Warner products, politicians including President George H. W. Bush denounced the label for releasing the song, Warner executives received death threats, Time Warner stockholders threatened to pull out of the company and the New Zealand police commissioner unsuccessfully tried to have the record banned there. Although Ice-T later voluntarily reissued Body Count without "Cop Killer", the furore seriously rattled Warner Music and in January 1993 WBR made an undisclosed deal releasing Ice-T from his contract and returning the Body Count master tapes to him. In the wake of the "Cop Killer" affair, Warner Bros. distanced itself from gangsta rap and in late 1995, it sold its 50% stake in Interscope Records and its controversial subsidiary Death Row Records (Tupac Shakur, Snoop Dogg) back to co-owners Jimmy Iovine and Ted Field. Iovine and Field quickly aligned Interscope with the Universal Music Group; the label, now known as Interscope-Geffen-A&M following the merger of several Universal imprints, is still run by Iovine today.

Some relief came later that year when comedian Jeff Foxworthy revived Warner Bros.' success with comedy recordings; his debut album You Might Be a Redneck If... was a major hit in the US and Canada, and both it and his follow-up album sold more than three million copies each.

=== End of an era: Ostin and Waronker depart ===
During 1994–1995, Warner Bros.'s successes and problems with its artists were overshadowed by a protracted period of highly publicized internecine strife, centering on Warner Music Group chairman Robert J. Morgado and his successor Michael J. Fuchs. In September 1993, Ostin began negotiations to renew his contract and it was at this point that Morgado unveiled his plan for a major corporate shakeup of the Warner group. This triggered a series of damaging corporate conflicts and in particular created a fatal rift between Morgado and Ostin. The first major casualty was Elektra chairman Bob Krasnow, who resigned abruptly in July 1994.

For many years Ostin had reported directly to Time Warner chairman Steve Ross (and then to Ross's successor Gerald Levin) but Morgado now insisted that Ostin should report to him, and he established a new division, Warner Music US, headed by Doug Morris, to oversee the three main record labels. Fearing the loss of autonomy and worried that he would be obliged to implement Morgado's "slash-and-burn" policy to streamline the label's staff and artist roster, he refused to carry out Morgado's orders and decided not to renew his contract. Ostin officially stepped down from Warner Bros. when his contract expired on December 31, 1994, although he stayed on as a senior consultant to Time Warner's chairman until August 1995. He later commented:

This business is about freedom and creative control. An executive has to be able to make risky decisions with minimal corporate interference. But Warner is a different company now than the company I was brought up in. And in the end, I found it impossible to operate in that kind of environment.

Ostin's departure sent shockwaves through the company and the industry, and elicited glowing tributes from colleagues and competitors like Joe Smith and Clive Davis, and musicians like Paul Simon and R.E.M. It also triggered an exodus of Warner executives who had joined the company primarily because of Ostin. Next to go was Lenny Waronker—he was designated to succeed Ostin as chairman but ultimately declined the job and left WBR soon after. Following a period of uncertainty and speculation, the two joined forces to establish a new label, DreamWorks Records. Waronker was replaced by ex–Atlantic Records president Danny Goldberg, but his tenure proved short. Long-serving WBR executive Russ Thyret, who had joined the label in 1971 and worked closely with Mo Ostin for many years, was promoted to vice-chairman in January 1995.

Gerald Levin forced Morgado to resign in May 1995 and he was replaced by HBO chairman Michael J. Fuchs. Fuchs sacked Morris a month later (sparking a US$50m breach of contract suit) and Warner Music US was dissolved. Morris' removal led to speculation that Ostin was being courted to return to WBR, but these reports proved unfounded since Ostin and Waronker moved to DreamWorks soon after. Morris moved to MCA Records.

Despite his close ties to Morris, Danny Goldberg was initially told he could remain as WBR president but he left the company in August 1995 after negotiating a settlement with Time Warner to terminate his five-year, US$20 million contract, which still had four years to run. He was subsequently appointed president of PolyGram subsidiary Mercury Records in October. Following Goldberg's departure Russ Thyret was promoted to chairman, CEO and label president. Fuchs himself was forced out of Time Warner in November 1995. In May 1997, Phil Quartararo took over as president of WBR, only weeks after he had left EMI's Virgin Records following a management shake-up there.

The departure of the team led by Ostin and Waronker also meant that many of the Warner artists whose careers they had nurtured and curated over the previous 30 years were now deprived of their patronage. As a result, by 2000 many of the "flagship" Warner acts of the Ostin/Waronker years left the label as their contracts expired. Ry Cooder was dropped in 1995 and Randy Newman followed Ostin and Waronker to DreamWorks, departing with a wry comment on his own status and the recent turmoil at Warner Bros.:

"I've sent Warner an amusing letter of resignation, and I haven't heard anything. It's like trying to find a general to surrender to. I think I'm gone, you know? And I signed with DreamWorks and I haven't heard from them! The people I'm leaving don't give a shit that I'm leaving and the people I'm going to don't give a shit that I'm coming!

Although never rising beyond "cult" status in terms of his sales as a solo artist, one of the most notable survivors from the Ostin era was Van Dyke Parks, who continued to release albums on Warner Bros. – Tokyo Rose (1989), the Brian Wilson collaboration Orange Crate Art (1995) and the live album Moonlighting: Live at the Ash Grove (1998). In 2004 Parks reunited with Brian Wilson to complete their long-shelved collaboration, Smile, which was released on the Nonesuch label to universal critical praise, winning a Grammy award, and making the Top 20 in the US and Top 10 in the UK, where it earned a gold record award.

In early 2001, there was a major restructure of the Warner Music Group; about 600 positions were eliminated across the three labels, and an executive reshuffle led to the departures of Thyret and Quartararo (as well as Reprise president Howie Klein) and the hiring of then-Interscope president Tom Whalley as head of Warner Bros. Records. In August Whalley appointed Jeff Ayeroff as Creative Director of Warner Bros. Records and Creative Consultant to Warner Music Group. Ayeroff had previously been WBR's Senior Vice-president and Creative Director from 1983 to 1986, overseeing many successful album covers and music videos in that period.

In 2002, Linkin Park won the Grammy Award for Best Hard Rock Performance for their single "Crawling". They were also nominated for Best New Artist and Best Rock Album for Hybrid Theory, which was the best-selling album of 2001 worldwide. In 2004, the band was nominated for their song "Session" for Best Rock Instrumental Performance. In 2006 the band won Best Rap/Sung Collaboration for the song "Numb/Encore" released under Warner Bros./Roc-A-Fella/Machine Shop.

=== 2004–2009: Warner Music Group ===
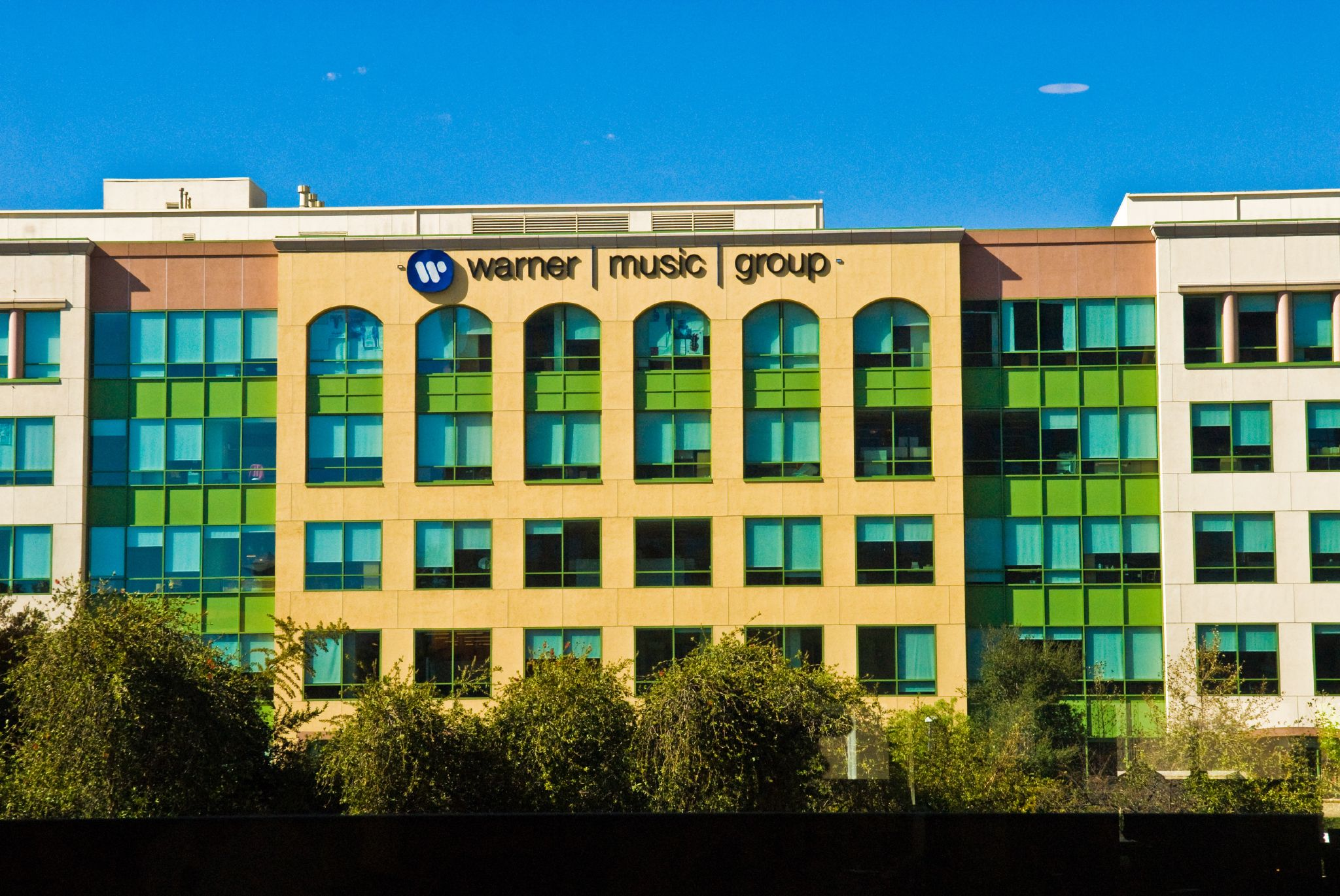
Warner Music Group's former West Coast headquarters, at 3400 Olive Avenue in Burbank, California.

The final Warner Bros. Records logo, which was used from 2003 to 2019.

In 2003, amid management disputes, sagging share prices and rising alarm about the impact of digital file sharing, Time Warner decided to unload its music operations. In March 2004, Time Warner's music assets were acquired by a private equity group headed by Thomas H. Lee Partners, Lexa Partners (led by Edgar Bronfman Jr., who put up US$150 million drawn from his family's stake in Vivendi), Bain Capital and Providence Equity Partners. The deal included an option that would allow Time Warner to buy back in if conditions proved favorable. Bronfman, Lee, Bain and Providence had reportedly recouped their investment by May 2006 through dividends, refinancing and a share offer floated in May 2005.

The sale was followed by a major restructure over the first half of 2004, which had aimed at slashing $27 million from the company's budget. The cost-cutting measures included more than 1000 staff layoffs worldwide, the dropping of 80 artists, comprising more than half the Warner roster, and the restructuring of the company's two "boutique" labels. Elektra was folded into Atlantic, and its sub-label Nonesuch was absorbed into the Warner Records label, although Elektra would be revived as an active label five years later. The restructure period was also marked by a short but widely publicised dispute between Warner and Madonna—although, notably, the label made public efforts to distance the dispute from their regular dealings with Madonna, who remained signed to Warner as a solo artist.

Following the private buyout of the music group, Madonna began talks with Warner management to dissolve the joint venture partnership in Madonna's Maverick label. Founded in 1992, Maverick had scored a major success in 1995 with Alanis Morissette's Jagged Little Pill, and Madonna and her two partners, Guy Oseary and Ronnie Dashed, jointly held a controlling 60% stake. After the talks broke down, the trio sued the company; they alleged mismanagement, improper accounting and profit-taking, claiming that Maverick had earned $100m in profit for the group, and seeking to recover $200 million in alleged lost revenue, but the suit was settled in June that year, with Madonna selling most of her stake in Maverick to Warner for just $10 million.

In 2005, following the global restructure, Warner Music Australia scored a major coup when it acquired the assets of the Australian Festival Mushroom Group. That company had originated as Festival Records in Sydney in the 1952, and after its acquisition by Rupert Murdoch in 1961, Festival became one of the leading Australian record companies, recording and/or releasing much of the most significant Australian pop and rock music of the era on its flagship Festival label or via its subsidiary imprints. Festival also signed valuable licensing and distribution deals with major local independent pop labels such as Spin (NSW) and Clarion (WA), and it subsequently took over many of these labels and acquired their masters, greatly increasing its holdings of key Australian pop/rock recordings.

In the 1970s Festival signed a distribution deal with the fledgling Melbourne label Mushroom Records, founded by Michael Gudinski. Mushroom scored a key breakthrough in 1974–75 with Melbourne band Skyhooks, whose debut album Living in the Seventies became the highest-selling Australian album ever issued up to that time. Mushroom enjoyed enormous success in Australia from the late 1970s on, and although Gudinski later moved the label's distribution to EMI for some years, the two companies were eventually merged—Festival acquired 49% of Mushroom in 1993 and bought the remainder when Gudinski sold his controlling share in 1998. Finally, in 2005, after multiple management reshuffles and a steady decline in revenue, News Ltd sold the group and its recording archive (said to contain over 20,000 master tapes) to Warner Music Australia for a reported AU$10 million.

Following the divestiture, WMG licensed the Warner Bros. trademarks, although this license could have been revoked if WMG came under control of a major motion picture studio.

After five years of dormancy, Elektra was revived as an active imprint in June 2009. In mid-2018, Elektra was detached from the Atlantic Records umbrella and reorganized into Elektra Music Group, once again operating as an independently managed frontline label of Warner Music.

=== 2010–present: Warner Records ===
In 2010, a corporate shakeup and a 16% drop in third-quarter revenue resulted in Whalley's departure from the label. Producer Rob Cavallo, previously WMG's chief creative officer, was appointed chairman of the Warner Bros. Records label group. Todd Moscowitz and Livia Tortella were named co-presidents, with Moscowitz as CEO and Tortella COO. The "trifecta" of Cavallo, Tortella and Moscowitz was expected to stabilize the label group; instead, as Warner continued to rely on rock, hip-hop grew in popularity and Warner's revenue decreased. In December 2012, Moscowitz resigned, and Cameron Stang, the chairman and CEO of Warner/Chappell and a member of the WMG board of directors, was named chairman and CEO of the label group. Tortella left six months later. Stang resigned in 2016, following a "tumultuous tenure." Dan McCarroll, named president in 2013, left in 2017. Although Warner artists had ten Top 10 albums, the label's performance was uneven. A bump in market share was attributed to the increased sales of albums by Prince and Bowie following their deaths in 2016.

In October 2017, Aaron Bay-Schuck and Tom Corson were named co-chairmen of Warner Bros. Records, with Bay-Schuck as CEO and Corson COO. Corson joined the company in January 2018; Bay-Schuck began in the fall of that year.

The Warner Bros. headquarters moved from Burbank to downtown Los Angeles in March 2019. On May 28, the label announced it had changed its name to Warner Records, and unveiled a new logo—replacing the Warner Bros. shield with a wordmark and black circle (both partially cut off at the bottom). WMG explained that the new logo was meant to resemble the Earth, a record, and the Sun, and had "artful simplicity and impactful typography that are ideally suited to the digital world". The change was necessitated by the upcoming expiration of WMG's license to the Warner Bros. trademarks; after the sale of Warner Music Group in 2004 by Time Warner (now Warner Bros. Discovery since 2022), the company had been granted a 15-year license to use the Warner Bros. name and shield logo. The new logo received mixed reviews, with marketing critics and former WMG employees lamenting the replacement of the historic Warner Bros. emblem (used by the label for 61 years) with a comparatively simplistic mark. The record label's ISRC code remained "WB1".

In 2018 and 2019, Warner increased its focus on catalog, releasing boxed sets to commemorate the anniversaries of albums including Green Day's Nimrod and Linkin Park's Hybrid Theory in addition to working with the estates of Mac Miller and Ramones to plan further catalog albums. NLE Choppa launched a label in partnership with Warner in 2019; his 2020 album, Top Shotta, went platinum in the US and Canada. New records by Omar Apollo, Gorillaz and Red Hot Chili Peppers were successful, and Dua Lipa's 2020 album Future Nostalgia was the 69th best-selling record in the US, and the tenth best-seller worldwide and the ninth best-seller in the US and the 6th worldwide in 2021. With growing pressure to increase market share, the success of Future Nostalgia "bought more time" for Bay-Schuck and Corson to retool the artist roster.

In 2021, Warner signed Zach Bryan and Benson Boone, among other artists. Teddy Swims, signed in 2019, had a six-times platinum single in 2023 for Lose Control. With new singer Emily Armstrong, Linkin Park had its biggest hit in 15 years, and the international music industry trade IFPI named Boone's "Beautiful Things" the year's biggest single worldwide. In October 2023, Bryan's American Heartbreak, his Warner debut, hit platinum sales, and nine singles from the album were certified gold and platinum. In February of the following year, two more albums and 16 singles hit gold and platinum status. In an interview with Billboard, Bay-Schuck said that Bryan was representative of the label's legacy: "No one was telling Prince what to do, no one was telling Madonna what to do. You give them advice, you challenge them, you insert your opinions where you can. But ultimately, those artists thrived because the label understood how to let them grow and mature and take swings on their own." In 2024, Warner Records was third in market share, the label's highest ranking since 2018.

== Affiliated labels ==
=== Current ===
- A&E Records (formerly Mushroom Records UK) (2003–present)
- Arkade Records (2016–present)
- Artery Recordings (2017–present)
- Beluga Heights (2008–present)
- Buu Music Records (2026–present)
- Cage Riot
- Clover Music (2018–present)
- Curb Records (1974–1982, 2000–present)
- Defiant Records (2023–present)
- Facultad de Némea (2017–present)
- Festival Mushroom Records (2005–present)
- Helium 3 (2006–present)
- Hotwire Unlimited (2010–present)
- Loveway Records (2009–present)
- Machine Shop Records (2001–present)
- Masked Records (2018–present)
- Mind of a Genius (2016–present)
- Nonesuch Records (2004–present)
- Parlophone (2014–present)
- REMember Music (2014–present)
- Reprise Records (1963–present)
- Sire Records (1978–1995, 2003–present)
- Tha Lights Global
- The Benton Music Records (2018–present)
- Word Records (2002–present)

=== Former ===
- 1017 Brick Squad Records
- 143 Records
- 4AD Records (1992–1998) (US only)
- Action Theory Records
- American Recordings (1988–1997 [US], 2005–2007 [worldwide])
- Autumn Records (1963–1965)
- Bearsville Records (1970–1984)
- BME Recordings
- Blacksmith Records (2005–2008)
- Brute/Beaute Records (2004–2007)
- Capricorn Records (1972–1977), (1990–1995)
- Chrysalis Records (1972–1976) (US only)
- Cold Chillin' Records (1987–1994)
- Dark Horse Records (1976–1992)
- Doghouse Records
- ECM Records (?–1984)
- Eternal Records (1980s–2000s)
- Extasy International Records (2000–2004)
- Full Moon Records (1974–1992)
- F-111 Records (1995–2001)
- Geffen Records (1980–1990)
- Giant Records and its subsidiaries the Medicine Label (1993–1995), Paladin, Revolution (1990–2001; catalog is owned by Warner Records today)
- Ice Age Entertainment
- Island Records (1977–1982, except for Steve Winwood releases until 1987)
- Jet Life Recordings
- Kwanza Records (1973–1974)
- Loma Records (1964–1968 and one boutique release in 2003)
- London Records (2000–2017; small part of catalog was secured by WMG after sold to Because Music, including New Order)
- Luaka Bop Records (1988–2000)
- Malpaso Records (1995–2000)
- Maverick Records (1992–2008; dormant)
- Maybach Music Group (2011–2012)
- Metal Blade Records (1988–1993)
- Music for Little People (1990–1995)
- Opal Records (1987–1993)
- OVO Sound (2012–2022)
- Paisley Park Records (1985–1994)
- Perezcious Music
- Playmaker Music
- Premeditated Records (middle 1990s)
- Public Broadcasting Service
- Qwest Records (1980–2000)
- Raybaw Records (2005–2008)
- RuffNation Records
- Slash Records (1982–1998; 2003–present)
- Teleprompt Records
- Tommy Boy Records (1985–2002; rights to pre-2002 catalog transferred to Atlantic Records and reacquired by a "new" Tommy Boy (Tommy Boy Entertainment) in 2017, being distributed by ADA subsidiary of WMG.)
- Valiant Records (1960–1966)
- Warner Alliance (1986–1998)
- Warner Western (198?–200?)
- Funk Volume (2015–2016)

== Publications ==
- Mondo Mando (1981), written by David Grisman, illustrated by Wayne Anderson

== See also ==
- List of record labels
- List of Warner Records artists
- Reprise Records
