= Sexy MF =

1992 single by Prince

- UK 7-inch single

Single by Prince and the New Power Generation

from the album Love Symbol
- A-side: "Strollin'" (UK)
- B-side: "Daddy Pop"
- Released: June 30, 1992
- Recorded: October 10, 1991
- Studio: Paisley Park (Chanhassen, Minnesota)
- Genre: Funk; funk rap; deep funk; R&B; retro-soul; nu jazz
- Length: 5:25 (7-inch); 7:32 (12-inch)
- Label: Paisley Park; Warner Bros.
- Songwriters: Prince; Levi Seacer Jr.; Tony M.
- Producer: Prince

Prince and the New Power Generation singles chronology
| "Thunder" (1992) | "Sexy MF" (1992) | "My Name Is Prince" (1992) |

Music video
- "Sexy MF" on YouTube

"Sexy MF" is a song by American musician Prince and the New Power Generation, released as a single from their 1992 album Love Symbol. The music and most of the lyrics were composed by Prince, while Levi Seacer Jr. came up with the chorus and the song's title. Tony M. also delivers a rap, which he wrote. The song and its refrain "You sexy motherfucker" caused some controversy, and edited versions were produced for radio, the music video and the US version of the album. The song was recorded in Paisley Park's Studio A in December 1991.

"Sexy MF" was released as the first single from Love Symbol in June 1992. In the United Kingdom, the song's explicit lyrical content prompted Warner Bros. Records to issue "Sexy MF" as a double A-side with the more radio-friendly "Strollin'"; however, UK radio stations preferred airing the former track. Commercially, the double A-side reached number four on the UK Singles Chart while "Sexy MF" peaked at number 66 on the US Billboard Hot 100 and became a top-20 hit in Australia, New Zealand, and 12 European countries.

== Recording ==
Basic tracking took place on October 10, 1991, at Paisley Park Studios, Chanhassen, MN, USA (during the same day as Damn U). "Sexy MF" was placed as the opening track of the Symbol album for a while, until Prince later added the track "My Name Is Prince", recorded a few months previously. It was included as the third track (second song) on the March 1992 and Summer 1992 configurations of Love Symbol, before the Album Intro segue was removed.

== Chart performance ==
The song was released in an edited version in the US, where it peaked at number 66 on the Billboard Hot 100 and number 76 on the Billboard Hot R&B chart. In the UK, the song peaked at number four.

== Critical reception ==
Andy Kastanas from The Charlotte Observer wrote, "Funkier than his latest stuff and a little more vulgar, this is a cool tune with plenty of jazzy guitars and trumpets." Dave Jennings from Melody Maker said, "I'd love to have been in the room when the WEA executives sat down to listen to this for the first time. Imagine the consternation when they realised that Prince's new single was called 'Sexy Midget F***wit'!" He added, "Naturally, there's no hope of getting airplay for such a song, especially since it's a maddeningly monotonous one-chord wonder with only a moderate measure of lecherous panache and a fair-to-middling brassy hook to recommend it; so the languid 'Strollin'' has had to be pulled from the last LP to lende the single commercial potency." A reviewer from Music Week commented, "It's a very sparse, basic groove not dissimilar to those churned out by James Brown in the Sixties, with lyrics that are alternately facile and controversial, the latter of which will keep airplay to a minimum. His fan base is such that it should, however, make significant inroads into the chart."

Parry Gettelman from Orlando Sentinel felt the song is "getting good performances out" of the New Power Generation, adding that NPG rapper Tony M. is "improved", and the band "really rocks". Johnny Dee from Smash Hits gave it two out of five, noting its "grunting and grinding in the usual Paisley Park sassy funk style with some gorgeous jazzy brazz-n-stuff". Charles Aaron from Spin found that the "Sexy MF" video "is simply Prince playing catch-up with Madonna's 'Justify My Love' and hundreds of pimpin'-ain't-easy hip hop clips. But the song itself is a cuddly monster of as groove, his first party-tape must-have since 'Housequake' from 1987's Sign o' the Times." Another Spin editor, Alec Foege, declared the track as "blissfully puerile". Richard Harrington from The Washington Post complimented its "lean, wickedly propulsive energy" in the grand tradition of James Brown, Curtis Mayfield and Prince's own "Housequake". He concluded, "It's too bad the chorus's explicitness undermines its airplay potential."

== Retrospective response ==
In a 2020 retrospective review, Andy Healy from Albumism called "Sexy MF" "raucous", noting the "funk stew" with "its punching beat and irresistible callout backed by powerful horn blasts". He stated that the song "remain just as intoxicating" as it did when the album first dropped." Stephen Thomas Erlewine from AllMusic remarked the song's "deep funk", stating that Love Symbol has Prince's best dance tracks since The Black Album. In 2019, Alexis Petridis from The Guardian ranked the song number 11 in his list of "Prince's 50 Greatest Singles", writing that it "offers up a JB's-ish groove that's simultaneously raw and tightly controlled, a chorus punctuated by the kind of lip-smacking noise also featured on 'Kiss' and its author on superb priapic form: I got wet dreams comin' out my ears!"

== Single formats ==
The single was available in multiple formats, including a Love Symbol-shaped vinyl disc. It was also included on The Hits 2, which is also a part of The Hits/The B-Sides. In addition, the "My Name Is Prince" maxi single includes a club mix of "Sexy MF". The music video has a direct-to-tape release, with the VHS single reaching number two on the Billboard music video chart.

== Personnel ==
Credits from Benoît Clerc and Guitarcloud

- Prince – lead and backing vocals
- Tony M. – rap
- Levi Seacer Jr. – co-lead vocals, electric guitar
- Tommy Barbarella – Hammond organ, synthesizers
- Sonny T. – bass guitar
- Michael B. – drums
- Kirk Johnson – percussion, backing vocals
- Damon Dickson – percussion, backing vocals
- DJ Graves – turntables, scratching
- Michael B. Nelson – trombone
- Kathy Jessen – baritone saxophone
- Brian Gallagher – tenor saxophone
- Dave Jensen – trumpet
- Steve Strand – trumpet

== Charts ==
=== Weekly charts ===
Weekly chart performance for "Sexy MF"
| Chart (1992) | Peak position |
|---|---|
| Australia (ARIA) | 5 |
| Austria (Ö3 Austria Top 40) | 6 |
| Belgium (Ultratop 50 Flanders) | 10 |
| Denmark (IFPI) | 7 |
| Europe (Eurochart Hot 100) | 8 |
| Europe (European Dance Radio) | 8 |
| France (SNEP) | 19 |
| Germany (GfK) | 11 |
| Greece (Pop + Rock) | 3 |
| Ireland (IRMA) with "Strollin'" | 5 |
| Italy (Musica e dischi) | 4 |
| Netherlands (Dutch Top 40) | 4 |
| Netherlands (Single Top 100) | 4 |
| New Zealand (Recorded Music NZ) | 6 |
| Norway (VG-lista) | 5 |
| Spain (AFYVE) | 12 |
| Sweden (Sverigetopplistan) | 13 |
| Switzerland (Schweizer Hitparade) | 8 |
| UK Singles (Official Charts) with "Strollin'" | 4 |
| UK Airplay (Music Week) | 32 |
| US Billboard Hot 100 | 66 |
| US Hot R&B/Hip-Hop Songs (Billboard) | 76 |

=== Year-end charts ===
Year-end chart performance for "Sexy MF"
| Chart (1992) | Position |
|---|---|
| Australia (ARIA) | 82 |
| Belgium (Ultratop) | 82 |
| Germany (Media Control) | 67 |
| Netherlands (Dutch Top 40) | 62 |
| Netherlands (Single Top 100) | 48 |
| Sweden (Topplistan) | 85 |
| Switzerland (Schweizer Hitparade) | 24 |
| UK Singles (OCC) | 80 |

== Release history ==
Release dates and formats for "Sexy MF"
| Region | Date | Format(s) | Label(s) | Ref. |
|---|---|---|---|---|
| United States | June 30, 1992 | 7-inch vinyl; cassette | Paisley Park; Warner Bros. | |
| United Kingdom | July 6, 1992 | 7-inch vinyl; 12-inch vinyl; CD; cassette | Paisley Park; Warner Bros. | |
| Japan | August 10, 1992 | Mini-CD | Warner Music Japan | |
