= Chaka Khan discography =

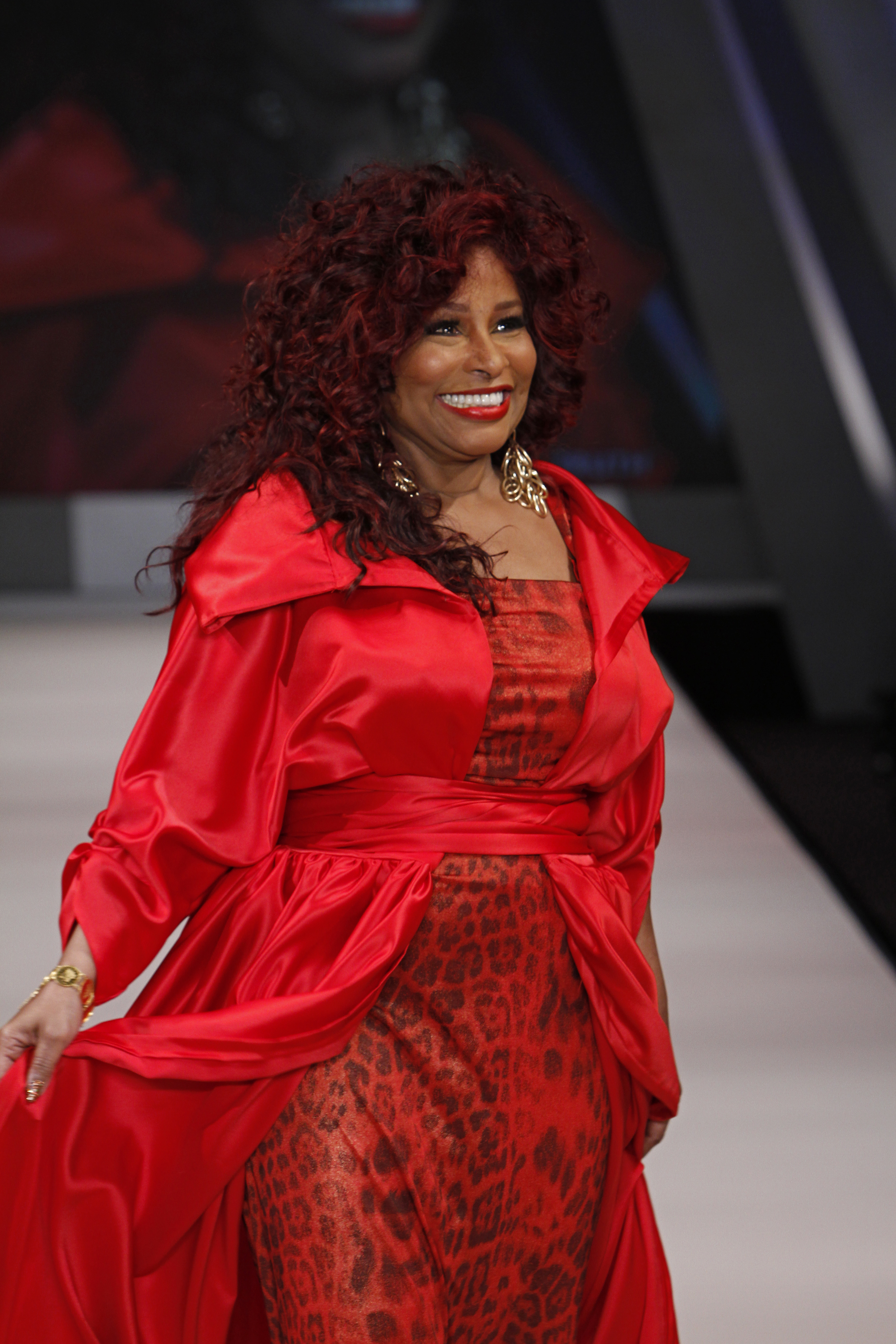
- Khan in 2012
- Studio albums: 13
- Live albums: 2
- Compilation albums: 7
- Singles: 46
- Guest appearances: 14

American R&B and soul singer Chaka Khan has released thirteen albums during her solo career. She has released a total of 46 solo singles throughout her career. Khan has placed four albums in the top twenty of the Billboard albums chart, scored one top 10 and four additional top-40 hits (three as a featured artist) on the Billboard Hot 100. On the Billboard R&B Songs chart, Khan hit the top 10 ten times (including three times as a featured artist) including five number ones (including two as a featured artist. On Billboard's Dance Club Chart, Khan had six number ones and another number one as a featured artist. On the UK Singles Chart, she has scored three top 10s, eight additional top 40 singles (including five as a featured artist).

Chaka Khan also recorded as a member of R&B/funk band Rufus. Khan released her first studio album in 1978 while she was still the lead singer of Rufus. She would continue to release albums with the group on and off until its dissolution in 1983. On most Rufus releases, the artist name was listed as "Rufus featuring Chaka Khan" or "Rufus and Chaka Khan". Her first solo single was "I'm Every Woman", also released in 1978. Rufus hit the Hot 100 top 10 three times, the US Top R&B Songs chart top 10 twelve times including five number ones, Billboard's Dance Club chart's top 10 four times including one number one. Rufus hit the UK top 40 with two versions of "Ain't Nobody", with both reaching the top 10.

== Label associations ==
Khan spent the first 14 years of her solo career with Warner Bros. Records, where she released eight albums. She has also released albums for the Elektra, NPG, Earthsong, and Burgundy labels.

== Albums ==
=== Studio albums ===
Title	Album details	Peak chart positions											Certifications (sales thresholds)
Title	Album details	US	US R&B	US Jazz	AUS	CAN	GER	NLD	NZ	SWE	SWI	UK	Certifications (sales thresholds)
Chaka	Released: October 12, 1978; Label: Warner Bros.	12	2	—	74	—	—	50	—	—	—	—	RIAA: Gold
Naughty	Released: March 26, 1980; Label: Warner Bros.	43	6	—	—	—	—	—	—	—	—	—	
What Cha' Gonna Do for Me	Released: April 15, 1981; Label: Warner Bros.	17	3	35	—	—	—	—	42	—	—	—	RIAA: Gold
Echoes of an Era	Released: January 14, 1982; Label: Elektra/Musician	105	38	11	—	—	—	—	—	—	—	—	
Chaka Khan	Released: November 17, 1982; Label: Warner Bros.	52	5	—	—	—	—	—	—	—	—	—	
I Feel for You	Released: October 1, 1984; Label: Warner Bros.	14	4	—	71	27	17	25	22	9	14	15	RIAA: Platinum; BPI: Gold; RIAJ: Gold
Destiny	Released: June 14, 1986; Label: Warner Bros.	67	25	—	—	—	50	49	—	13	26	77	
ck	Released: November 22, 1988; Label: Warner Bros.	125	17	—	115	—	—	—	—	—	—	—	
The Woman I Am	Released: April 14, 1992; Label: Warner Bros.	92	9	—	159	—	—	—	—	40	—	—	
Come 2 My House	Released: July 21, 1998; Label: NPG	—	49	—	—	—	—	—	—	—	—	—	
ClassiKhan	Released: October 5, 2004; Label: Earthsong/AgU	—	43	—	—	—	—	—	—	—	—	—	
Funk This	Released: September 25, 2007; Label: Burgundy	15	5	—	—	—	—	—	—	—	—	—	
Hello Happiness	Released: February 15, 2019; Label: Diary, Island	48	—	—	—	—	—	178	—	—	32	18	
Chakzilla	Released: September 18, 2026; Label: BMG	—	—	—	—	—	—	—	—	—	66	—	
"—" denotes single was not released or failed to chart in that territory.

=== Live albums ===
Title	Album details	Peak chart positions
Title	Album details	US R&B
S.O.U.L.	Released: February 22, 2011; Label: Sony Music	45
Homecoming	Released: March 13, 2020; Label: BMG	—

=== Compilation albums ===
Title	Album details	Peak chart positions						Certifications (sales thresholds)
Title	Album details	US 200	US R&B	US Dance	AUS	NLD	UK	Certifications (sales thresholds)
Life Is a Dance: The Remix Project	Released: May 22, 1989; Label: Warner Bros.	—	—	1	143	47	14	BPI: Gold
The Remix Project: Greatest Hits	Released: November 28, 1993; Label: Warner Bros.	—	—	—	157	—	—	
Epiphany: The Best of Chaka Khan, Vol. 1	Released: November 12, 1996; Label: Reprise	84	22	—	125	—	—	RIAA: Gold; BPI: Gold
Dance Classics of Chaka Khan	Released: March 16, 1999 (Japan Release Only); Label: Warner Music Japan	—	—	—	—	—	—	
I'm Every Woman: The Best of Chaka Khan	Released: September 14, 1999; Label: Reprise	—	—	—	—	—	62	
The Platinum Collection	Released: June 26, 2006; Label: Warner Platinum/Rhino	—	—	—	—	—	—	
The Essential Chaka Khan	Released: November 7, 2011; Label: Music Club Deluxe/Rhino	—	—	—	—	—	—	
Japanese Singles Collection -Greatest Hits- (Chaka Khan album)	Released: November 17, 2021; Label: Warner Music Japan	—	—	—	—	—	—	
"—" denotes single was not released or failed to chart in that territory.

== Singles ==
=== As main artist ===
Year	Single	Chart positions											Certifications	Album
Year	Single	US	US R&B /HH	US Dance	AUS	BEL	CAN	GER	IRE	NLD	NZ	UK	Certifications	Album
1978	"I'm Every Woman"	21	1	30	27	20	38	—	16	15	18	11	RIAA: Gold; ARIA: Platinum; BPI: Platinum; RMNZ: Platinum	Chaka
1979	"Life Is a Dance"	—	40	—	—	—	—	—	—	—	—	—		Chaka
1980	"Clouds"	103	10	31	—	—	—	—	—	—	—	—		Naughty
1980	"Papillon (aka Hot Butterfly)"	—	22	31	—	—	—	—	—	—	—	—		Naughty
1980	"Get Ready, Get Set"	—	48	—	—	—	—	—	—	—	—	—		Naughty
1981	"What Cha' Gonna Do for Me"	53	1	22	—	—	—	—	—	—	21	—		What Cha' Gonna Do for Me
1981	"We Can Work It Out"	—	34	22	—	—	—	—	—	—	—	—		What Cha' Gonna Do for Me
1981	"I Know You, I Live You"	—	—	22	—	—	—	—	—	—	—	—		What Cha' Gonna Do for Me
1981	"Any Old Sunday"	—	68	—	—	—	—	—	—	—	—	—		What Cha' Gonna Do for Me
1982	"Got to Be There"	67	5	—	—	—	—	—	—	—	—	—		Chaka Khan
1983	"Tearin' It Up"	—	48	26	—	—	—	—	—	—	—	—		Chaka Khan
1983	"Best in the West"	—	—	—	—	—	—	—	—	—	—	—		Chaka Khan
1984	"I Feel for You"	3	1	1	4	8	2	4	1	12	2	1	RIAA: Platinum; BPI: Platinum	I Feel for You
1985	"This Is My Night"	60	11	1	—	12	85	47	7	20	34	14		I Feel for You
1985	"Through the Fire"	60	15	—	—	—	—	—	—	—	—	77		I Feel for You
1985	"Eye to Eye"	—	—	—	—	—	—	—	12	43	—	16		I Feel for You
1985	"(Krush Groove) Can't Stop the Street"	—	18	30	—	—	—	—	—	—	—	80		Krush Groove: Music from the Original Motion Picture Soundtrack
1985	"Own the Night"	57	66	—	—	—	—	—	—	—	—	—		Miami Vice soundtrack
1986	"The Other Side of the World"	—	81	—	—	—	—	—	—	—	—	—		Destiny
1986	"Love of a Lifetime"	53	21	11	—	—	87	—	—	34	—	52		Destiny
1986	"Watching The World"	—	—	—	—	—	—	—	—	—	—	—		Destiny
1986	"Tight Fit"	—	28	—	—	—	—	—	—	—	—	—		Destiny
1986	"Earth to Mickey"	—	93	—	—	—	—	—	—	—	—	—		Destiny
1988	"It's My Party"	—	5	—	—	—	—	—	—	—	—	71		CK
1989	"Baby Me"	—	12	—	—	—	—	—	—	—	—	—		CK
1989	"Soul Talkin'"	—	—	—	—	—	—	—	—	—	—	—		CK
1989	"I'm Every Woman" (Remix)	—	—	1	147	20	—	—	7	9	—	8		Life Is a Dance: The Remix Project
1989	"Ain't Nobody" (with Rufus) (Remix)	—	—	1	—	—	—	9	8	—	—	6		Life Is a Dance: The Remix Project
1989	"I Feel for You" (Remix)	—	—	1	—	—	—	—	1	—	—	45		Life Is a Dance: The Remix Project
1992	"Love You All My Lifetime"	68	2	1	193	—	—	—	—	—	—	49		The Woman I Am
1992	"You Can Make the Story Right"	—	8	—	—	—	—	—	—	—	—	—		The Woman I Am
1992	"I Want"	—	62	—	—	—	—	—	—	—	—	—		The Woman I Am
1993	"Don't Look at Me That Way"	—	—	—	—	—	—	—	—	—	—	73		The Woman I Am
1995	"Love Me Still"	—	—	—	—	—	—	—	—	—	—	—		Music from the Motion Picture "Clockers"
1996	"My Funny Valentine"	—	—	—	—	—	—	—	—	—	—	—		Waiting to Exhale: Original Soundtrack Album
1996	"Never Miss the Water" (featuring Me'Shell Ndegeocello)	102	36	1	167	—	—	—	—	—	—	59		Epiphany: The Best of Chaka Khan, Vol. 1
1998	"Spoon"	—	—	—	—	—	—	—	—	—	—	—		Come 2 My House
1998	"Don't Talk 2 Strangers"	—	—	—	—	—	—	—	—	—	—	—		Come 2 My House
2007	"Angel"	119	26	—	—	—	—	—	—	—	—	—		Funk This
2007	"Disrespectful" (featuring Mary J. Blige)	—	—	1	—	—	—	—	—	—	—	—		Funk This
2007	"You Belong to Me" (featuring Michael McDonald)	—	63	—	—	—	—	—	—	—	—	—		Funk This
2008	"One for All Time"	—	35	—	—	—	—	—	—	—	—	—		Funk This
2013	"It's Not Over" (featuring Lecrae)	—	—	7	—	—	—	—	—	—	—	—		Non-album single
2018	"Like Sugar"	—	—	—	—	— (Note: "Like Sugar" appeared on the Tip listings, bubbling under the main singles chart.)	—	—	—	—	—	—	BPI: Silver	Hello Happiness
2019	"Hello Happiness"	—	—	—	—	—	—	—	—	—	—	—		Hello Happiness
2022	"Woman Like Me"	—	—	—	—	—	—	—	—	—	—	—		Non-album single
2026	"Chakzilla"	—	—	—	—	—	—	—	—	—	—	—		Chakzilla
2026	"Boogie's in My Soul" (featuring Snoop Dogg)	—	—	—	—	—	—	—	—	—	—	—		Chakzilla
2026	"Curious Subject"	—	—	—	—	—	—	—	—	—	—	—		Chakzilla
"—" denotes single was not released or failed to chart in that territory.

=== As featured performer ===
Year	Single	Peak chart positions											Certifications	Album
Year	Single	US Hot	US R&B	US Dance	AUS	BEL	CAN	GER	IRE	NLD	NZ	UK	Certifications	Album
1978	"Stuff Like That" (with Quincy Jones and Ashford & Simpson)	21	1	—	—	—	23	—	—	24	—	34		Sounds...and Stuff Like That!!
1986	"Higher Love" (with Steve Winwood)	1	—	—	8	31	1	49	11	26	11	13		Back in the High Life
1989	"I'll Be Good to You" (with Quincy Jones and Ray Charles)	18	1	1	—	34	48	28	18	38	7	21		Back on the Block
1990	"The Places You Find Love" (with Quincy Jones and Siedah Garrett)	—	39	—	—	—	—	—	—	—	—	—		Back on the Block
1992	"Feels Like Heaven" (with Peter Cetera)	71	—	—	—	—	—	—	—	—	—	—		World Falling Down
1995	"Watch What You Say" (with Guru)	—	93	13	—	—	—	—	—	—	—	28		Jazzmatazz, Vol. 2: The New Reality
1996	"Missing You" (with Brandy, Tamia and Gladys Knight)	25	10	—	—	—	—	—	—	—	2	—	RMNZ: Platinum	Set It Off soundtrack
1998	"Come On" (with The New Power Generation)	—	—	—	—	—	—	—	—	—	—	65		Newpower Soul
1998	"The Longer We Make Love" (with Barry White)	—	—	—	—	—	—	—	—	—	—	—		Staying Power
2000	"All Good?" (with De La Soul)	96	41	17	34	—	—	76	—	76	—	33		Art Official Intelligence: Mosaic Thump
2001	"The Essence" (with Herbie Hancock)	—	—	—	—	—	—	—	—	—	—	—		Future2Future
2005	"Give and Let Live" (with Hope Collective)	—	—	—	—	—	—	—	—	—	—	—		Non-album single
2010	"Soul Survivor" (with Beverley Knight)	—	—	—	—	—	—	—	—	—	—	183		100%
2017	"Say a Prayer" (with Tieks feat. Popcaan)	—	—	—	—	—	—	—	—	—	—	—		Non-album single
2023	"Tekken 2" (Bombay Bicycle Club featuring Chaka Khan)	—	—	—	—	—	—	—	—	—	—	—		My Big Day
2024	"Immortal Queen" (with Sia)	—	—	—	—	—	—	—	—	—	—	—		Reasonable Woman
"—" denotes single was not released or failed to chart in that territory.

== Other appearances ==
Singles (above) are excluded.

Year	Song	Collaborator(s)	Album
1977	"Take Me Back to Chicago"	Chicago	Chicago XI
1981	"Wargames", "Julia", and "Robot Man"	Rick Wakeman	1984
1981	"Better Now We're Friends"	Henry Gross	What's in a Name
1983	"No See, No Cry"	—	Superman III soundtrack
1986	"Underground"	David Bowie	Labyrinth soundtrack
1989	"Fever"	—	Rock, Rhythm & Blues
1991	"Someday We'll All Be Free"	B.E.F. (British Electric Foundation)	Music of Quality and Distinction Volume 2
1992	"Time to Be Lovers"	Michael McDonald	Beverly Hills 90210 soundtrack
1993	"Between the Sheets"	Fourplay	Between the Sheets
1994	"Miles Blowin'"	—	Sugar Hill soundtrack
1995	"Hot Fun in the Summertime"	The Manhattan Transfer	Tonin'
1995	"Free Yourself"	—	To Wong Foo, Thanks for Everything! Julie Newmar soundtrack
1996	"I'm Every Woman" (live)	—	Sinbad's 2nd Annual Summer Jam: 70's Soul Music Festival
1996	"Raspberry"	—	One Voice: The Songs of Chage and Aska
1996	"Christmas Only Once a Year"	—	12 Soulful Nights of Christmas
1997	"Summertime"	—	Porgy & Bess
1997	"Pain"	—	Living Single soundtrack
1998	"Sweet Thing" (new studio version)	—	New York Undercover: A Night at Natalie's
1998	"Free"	Graham Central Station, Prince	GCS 2000
1999	"I'm Every Woman" (live)	Whitney Houston (with Faith Hill, Brandy, LeAnn Rimes and Mary J. Blige)	VH1 Divas Live/99
2000	"Have a Little Faith in Me"	—	Disappearing Acts soundtrack
2000	"So Crazy for This Love (Cru-Cre Corroro)"	—	A Love Affair: The Music of Ivan Lins
2000	"Living in Divine Time"	Melissa Vardey	Living in Divine Time featuring Chaka Khan
2000	"Chaka Intro"	Melissa Vardey	Living in Divine Time featuring Chaka Khan
2000	"It All Begins with Love"	Melissa Vardey	Living in Divine Time featuring Chaka Khan
2001	"Your Amazing Grace"	Marcus Miller	M²
2002	"Get My Party On"	Shaggy	Lucky Day
2002	"What's Going On" (live)	—	Standing in the Shadows of Motown soundtrack
2002	"Ain't No Mountain High Enough" (live)	Montell Jordan	Standing in the Shadows of Motown soundtrack
2004	"Little Wing"	Kenny Olson	Power of Soul: A Tribute to Jimi Hendrix
2004	"Beautiful"	Kenny G	At Last...The Duets Album
2005	"Back Again"	Soulive	Break Out
2005	"You Send Me"	Rod Stewart	Thanks for the Memory: The Great American Songbook, Volume IV
2007	"Shining Star"	—	Interpretations: Celebrating the Music of Earth, Wind & Fire
2007	"Lullaby of Birdland"	—	We All Love Ella: Celebrating the First Lady of Song
2007	"(If You Can't Sing It) You'll Have to Swing It (Mr. Paganini)"	Natalie Cole	We All Love Ella: Celebrating the First Lady of Song
2010	"Lowdown"	Incognito and Mario Biondi	Transatlantic R.P.M.
2010	"The Song"	Incognito	Transatlantic R.P.M.
2010	"Alive"	Billy Cobham	Drum n Voice Vol. 3
2010	"The Song Goes On"	Herbie Hancock (with K. S. Chithra, Anoushka Shankar and Wayne Shorter)	The Imagine Project
2010	"One More Try"	Ai	The Last Ai
2010	"Through the Fire"	Ai	The Last Ai
2011	"High Wire - The Aerialist"	Corea, Clarke and White	Forever
2011	"I Loves You, Porgy"	Corea, Clarke and White	Forever
2019	"Help Me"	-	Joni 75: A Birthday Celebration
2019	"Big Yellow Taxi"	La Marisou, James Taylor, and Brandi Carlile	Joni 75: A Birthday Celebration
2019	"Nobody"	Ariana Grande	Charlie’s Angels

== See also ==
- Rufus discography
