= The Platinum Collection (Chaka Khan album) =

2006 compilation album by Chaka Khan

Greatest hits album by Chaka Khan
- Released: June 26, 2006
- Recorded: 1978–1993
- Genre: R&B; funk
- Length: 69:16
- Label: WEA; Rhino Entertainment

Chaka Khan chronology
ClassiKhan (2004)	The Platinum Collection (2006)	Funk This (2007)

Professional ratings
Review scores
Source	Rating
Allmusic	link

The Platinum Collection is a compilation album of recordings by American funk/R&B singer Chaka Khan, released by the Warner label in 2006.

The Platinum Collection was the second career retrospective of Khan's work to be released, and also the second one-disc set, following 1996's Epiphany: The Best of Chaka Khan, Vol. 1 (re-released in 1999 and 2005, also under the title I'm Every Woman: The Best of Chaka Khan), which included sixteen tracks: eight solo hits, two with Rufus and six tracks from the shelved album Dare You to Love Me, recorded between 1993 and 1995.

The fourteen-track Platinum Collection includes more or less the same selection of songs as Epiphany, but with a few important alterations; the set omits the Rufus track "Tell Me Something Good" as well as "And the Melody Still Lingers On (A Night in Tunisia)" from 1981's What Cha' Gonna Do for Me, along with five of the 1993-1995 recordings. These are replaced with "Love of a Lifetime" from 1986's Destiny and "Love You All My Lifetime" and "Don't Look At Me That Way" from 1992's The Woman I Am.

The Platinum Collection also features two of Khan's biggest chart hits that were not included in the Epiphany set, both from her best-selling album I Feel for You: "This Is My Night" and "Eye to Eye" – the versions used on The Platinum Collection are, however, not the original recordings but are remixes dating from 1989 and the compilation Life is a Dance - The Remix Project.

== Track listing ==
1. "I Feel for You" (Prince) - 5:46
  - From 1984 album I Feel for You
2. "I'm Every Woman" (Ashford, Simpson) - 4:08
  - From 1978 album Chaka
3. "Ain't Nobody" (Wolinski) - 4:41 (With Rufus)
  - From Rufus & Chaka Khan's 1983 album Stompin' at the Savoy - Live
4. "This Is My Night" (1989 Remix Version) (Frank, Murphy) - 5:06
  - From 1989 compilation Life is a Dance - The Remix Project. Original version appears on 1984 album I Feel for You
5. "Eye to Eye" (1989 Remix Version) (Sembello) - 8:21
  - From 1989 compilation Life is a Dance - The Remix Project. Original version appears on 1984 album I Feel for You
6. "Papillon (a.k.a. Hot Butterfly)" (Diamond) - 4:08
  - From 1980 album Naughty
7. "I Know You, I Live You" (Khan, Mardin) - 4:28
  - From 1981 album What Cha' Gonna Do for Me
8. "Love of a Lifetime" (Gamson, Gartside) - 4:16
  - From 1986 album Destiny
9. "The End of a Love Affair" (Redding) - 5:13
  - From 1988 album CK
10. "Love You All My Lifetime" (Klarmann, Weber) - 4:41
  - From 1992 album The Woman I Am
11. "Don't Look at Me That Way" (Warren) - 4:50
  - From 1992 album The Woman I Am
12. "What Cha' Gonna Do for Me" (Doheny, Stuart) - 3:53
  - From 1981 album What Cha' Gonna Do for Me
13. "Every Little Thing" (DeVeaux, Gamson, Khan, Thomas) - 5:12
  - 1993 recording, first released on 1996 compilation Epiphany: The Best of Chaka Khan, Vol. 1
14. "Through the Fire" (Foster, Keane, Weil) - 4:47
  - From 1984 album I Feel for You
