= Dance Classics of Chaka Khan =

1999 compilation album by Chaka Khan

Greatest hits album by Chaka Khan
- Released: February 24, 1999
- Genre: R&B
- Label: Warner Bros., Japan

Chaka Khan chronology
Come 2 My House (1998)	Dance Classics of Chaka Khan (1999)	ClassiKhan (2004)

Professional ratings
Review scores
Source	Rating
Allmusic	3.5/5 stars

Dance Classics of Chaka Khan is a compilation album of recordings by American R&B/funk singer Chaka Khan released on the Warner Bros. Records label in Japan in 1999.

As the title suggests, the compilation mainly focuses on the dancefloor-friendly part of Khan's repertoire from the late 1970s to mid-1980s, including classic single cuts such as "I'm Every Woman", "Fate", "Eye To Eye", "Clouds", "I Feel for You", as well as album tracks such as "Pass It On (Sure Thing)" and "A Woman in a Man's World".

Dance Classics is, however, mainly notable for the inclusion of two rarities: the original 12" Long Vocal Mix and 12" Instrumental Version of the 1982 hit single "Tearin' It Up", both mixed by legendary DJ Larry Levan and as yet only available on this compilation. The original version of "Tearin' It Up" appears on the eponymous Chaka Khan album, which remains unreleased on CD in both the United States and Europe.

The Dance Classics of Chaka Khan set also features both the original 1978 version and the 1989 remix of "I'm Every Woman" (from Life is a Dance - The Remix Project) and concludes with the 1984 ballad "Through the Fire".

== Track listing ==
1. "Tearin' It Up" (Long Vocal Mix) (Lumibao, Sigler) - 7:23
  - Original version appears on 1982 album Chaka Khan
2. "I'm Every Woman" (Ashford & Simpson) - 4:06
  - From 1978 album Chaka
3. "Pass It On (A Sure Thing)" (Maiden, Washburn) - 5:03
  - Original version appears on 1982 album Chaka Khan
4. "Clouds" (Ashford, Simpson) 4:26
  - From 1980 album Naughty
5. "Fate" (Bugatti, Musker) - 3:15
  - From 1981 album What Cha' Gonna Do For Me
6. "Eye to Eye" (Freeman, Sembello, Sembello, Sembello) - 4:39
  - From 1984 album I Feel for You
7. "I Feel for You" (Prince) - 5:45
  - From 1984 album I Feel for You
8. "A Woman in a Man's World" (Kastner, McNally) - 3:58
  - From 1978 album Chaka
9. "What Cha' Gonna Do for Me" (Doheny, Stuart) - 3:53
  - From 1981 album What Cha' Gonna Do For Me
10. "I Know You, I Live You" (Khan, Mardin) - 4:29
  - From 1981 album What Cha' Gonna Do For Me
11. "I'm Every Woman" (Remix Version By Dancin' Danny D.) (Ashford, Simpson) - 8:21
  - From 1989 compilation Life is a Dance - The Remix Project. Original version appears on 1978 album Chaka
12. "Tearin' It Up" (Instrumental) (Lumibao, Sigler) - 8:08
  - Original version appears on 1982 album Chaka Khan
13. "Through the Fire" (Foster, Keane, Weil) - 4:45
  - From 1984 album I Feel for You

== Personnel ==
- Michel Comte – Photography
- David Foster – Producer
- Larry Levan – Remixing
- Arif Mardin – Producer
- Russ Titelman – Producer
- Glenn Wexler – Cover Photo
