= The Woman I Am (Chaka Khan album) =

1992 studio album by Chaka Khan

Studio album by Chaka Khan
- Released: April 14, 1992
- Length: 64:14
- Label: Warner Bros.
- Producer: Jerry Barnes; Katreese Barnes; Wayne Braithwaite; David Gamson; Gary Haase; Arif Mardin; Joe Mardin; Marcus Miller; George Whitty; Ralf Zang

Chaka Khan chronology
Life Is a Dance: The Remix Project (1989)	The Woman I Am (1992)	Epiphany: The Best of Chaka Khan, Vol. 1 (1996)

Singles from The Woman I Am
- 1. "Love You All My Lifetime" Released: March 5, 1992; 2. "You Can Make the Story Right" Released: June 18, 1992; 3. "Give Me All"/"The Woman I Am" Released: July 13, 1992 (UK); 4. "I Want" Released: October 15, 1992; 5. "Don't Look at Me That Way" Released: March 18, 1993

The Woman I Am is the eighth studio album by American singer Chaka Khan. It was released by Warner Bros. Records on April 14, 1992, in the United States. Dedicated to her friend Miles Davis, who had died the previous year, the album was Khan's first full-length project since 1988's CK. Khan worked with a variety of producers on the album, including multi-instrumentalist Marcus Miller, Scritti Politti's David Gamson as well as frequent collaborator Arif Mardin and his son Joe Mardin.

The album received largely mixed reviews from music critics but became Khan's highest-charting album on the US Top R&B/Hip-Hop Albums chart since 1984's I Feel for You. In 1993, it earned her a Grammy Award for Best R&B Vocal Performance, Female. Due to increasing artistic differences between Khan and Warner Bros, with her planned 1995 follow-up Dare You to Love Me eventually being shelved, The Woman I Am would mark Khan's final full-length release for a major label.

== Overview ==
The album mainly focuses on material from the contemporary R&B, soul and funk genres and was Khan's debut as executive producer in charge of production. The main producer on the album was the Grammy Award winning jazz multi-instrumentalist Marcus Miller but it also includes Khan's first collaborations with Arif Mardin since 1986's Destiny; "This Time" and the closing track "Don't Look at Me That Way", both co-produced by Mardin's son Joe Mardin. "Love You All My Lifetime" saw Khan teaming up with Scritti Politti's David Gamson – who incidentally had also produced the opening track on Destiny with its confusingly similar title; "Love of a Lifetime". The single track "I Want" features a guest appearance by William Galison on harmonica and the suggestive ballad "You Can Make the Story Right" was recorded with bassist and producer Wayne Braithwaite, best known for his work with Will Downing and Kenny G.

== Singles ==
The Woman I Am produced seven singles. Lead single "Love You All My Lifetime," written by German composer duo Klarmann/Weber, became a number one hit on Billboard's US Dance Club Songs and peaked at number 2 on the Hot R&B/Hip-Hop Songs chart. Follow-up "You Can Make the Story Right," penned by Gabrielle Goodman and Wayne Bathwaite, reached number eight on the Hot R&B/Hip-Hop Songs chart. Further singles include "I Want", "Give Me All", "Facts of Love" and the Diane Warren-penned ballad "Don't Look at Me That Way." "The Woman I Am," written by Dyan Cannon, Chaka Khan, and Brenda Russell, failed to chart. Both lead single "Love You All My Lifetime" and "Give Me All" were issued in a wide variety of dance remixes by among others Frankie Knuckles.

== Critical reception ==
Professional ratings
Review scores
Source	Rating
AllMusic	2.5/5 stars
Los Angeles Times	3/4 stars
Rolling Stone	4/5 stars

In his review of The Woman I Am, AllMusic's Alex Henderson describes the album as "high-tech, yet warm instead of mechanical. And on songs ranging from the melancholy "Telephone" to the introspective title song and the appealing single "Love You All My Lifetime," it's clear that Khan was given strong material to work with." Connie Johnson from Los Angeles Times rated the album three out of four stars and wrote: "Nobody has influenced more post-’70s female R&B; singers than Khan and Aretha Franklin. On an off day they’re still more intriguing than many of their contemporaries working in peak form. Some of the tracks here are vintage Khan: sly, sexy and assertive. "Give Me All" has a dark, incendiary groove to it, while "I Want" is a teasing little invitation with an urgent undercurrent. There's nothing trend-setting here, but even when Khan just coasts she still manages to stay in the race."

Entertainment Weekly's David Browne noted: "Khan has been the great untapped voice of modern R&B — a singer with a lusty, brassy delivery that’s usually placed in the most inappropriate and generic surroundings. Sadly, that’s the case once again with The Woman I Am, on which 10 producers strive hard to make Khan appeal to the young, black new-jack audience that favors singers like Lisa Fischer and Keith Washington [...] But it’s all for naught. Songs like "Everything Changes" are more formula than baby food, and the synthesizer-heavy arrangements are leaden and lumpy." Rolling Stone magazine called the album a "cause for celebration because it features her singing catchy, rhythmically compelling material in a crystal-clear voice for the first time in ten years [...] Believe the hype: Chaka is back on the block – and bravas are in order."

== Commercial success ==
The Woman I Am became Khan's highest-charting album on the US Top R&B/Hip-Hop Albums chart since 1984's I Feel for You, peaking at number nine. By 2005, the album had sold 197,000 copies in United States, according to Nielsen SoundScan.

== Track listing ==
The Woman I Am track listing
No.	Title	Writer(s)	Producer(s)	Length
1.	"Everything Changes"	Chaka Khan; Ben Marguiles	Marcus Miller	4:38
2.	"Give Me All"	Jerry Barnes; Katreese Barnes	J. Barnes; K. Barnes	4:24
3.	"Telephone"	Khan; Hans-Jürgen Buchner	Miller	4:21
4.	"Keep Givin' Me Lovin'"	Khan; Camus Mare Celli; Andres Levin; Mica Paris	Ralf Zang	4:32
5.	"Facts of Love"	Chaka Khan; Mardin	Zang	4:35
6.	"Love You All My Lifetime"	Irmgard Klarmann; Felix Weber	Gary Haase; George Whitty; Khan	4:08
7.	"I Want"	Donald D. Bowden; Janice Dempsey; James McKinney	Miller	5:50
8.	"You Can Make the Story Right"	Wayne Braithwaite; Gabrielle Goodman		5:13
9.	"Be My Eyes"	Khan; Daryll Duncan	Haase; Whitty; Khan	5:00
10.	"This Time"	David Lasley; Robin Lerner; Marsha Malamet	Arif Mardin; Joe Mardin	5:16
11.	"The Woman I Am"	Khan; Dyan Cannon; Brenda Russell	Miller	5:09
12.	"Love With No Strings"	Wesley Magoogan; Maggie Ryder	Haase; Whitty	5:00
13.	"Don't Look at Me That Way"	Diane Warren	A. Mardin; J. Mardin	4:50
Total length:				64:14

== Personnel ==
Performers and musicians

- Terry Burrus – synthesizer solo track: 1
- Steve Ferrone – drums track: 1, 3
- Gene Williams – programming, synthesizer track: 2
- Ras Tschaka Tonge – timbales track: 3
- Abraham Laboriel – bass guitar track: 6
- Bobby Lyle – Rhodes and clavinet track: 6
- William Galison – harmonica track: 7
- George Whitty – programming, synthesizer, piano, bass guitar and drums tracks: 9, 12
- Everette Harp – alto saxophone track: 11
- Anthony Jackson – bass guitar track: 12
- Dave Koz – saxophone track: 13
- Bryan Sutton – guitar
- Wah Wah Watson – guitar track: 6
- Jeff Pevar - guitar track 3

Technical

- Chaka Khan – executive producer in charge of production (entire album), producer track: 9
- Benny Medina and Steve Margo – executive album producers
- Marcus Miller – producer tracks: 1, 3, 7, 11
- Jerry Barnes – producer track: 2
- Katreese Barnes – producer track: 2
- Ralf Zang – producer tracks: 4, 5
- David Gamson – producer track: 6
- Wayne Braithwaite – producer track: 8
- Gary Haase – producer track: 9, 12
- George Whitty – producer track: 9, 12
- Arif Mardin – producer tracks: 10, 13
- Joe Mardin – producer tracks: 10, 13

== Non-album tracks and remixes ==
- "Love You All My Lifetime" (Album Version Edit) – 4:18
- "Love You All My Lifetime" (Love Suite 12" Mix Act 1) – 8:15
- "Love You All My Lifetime" (Love Suite 12" Mix Act 2 Dub) – 4:25
- "Love You All My Lifetime" (The Diva Edit) – 8:01
- "Love You All My Lifetime" (Diva Dub) – 7:03
- "Love You All My Lifetime" (Garage Mix W/Strings) – 6:50
- "Love You All My Lifetime" (House Mix) – 6:50
- "Love You All My Lifetime" (Love And Kisses Breakdown Mix) – 7:06
- "Love You All My Lifetime (Single Remix) – 4:02
- "Give Me All" (Classic Club Mix) – 6:22
- "Give Me All" (Extended Version R&B) – 7:13
- "Give Me All" (Fierce Club Version) – 7:00

== Charts ==
=== Weekly charts ===
Weekly chart performance for The Woman I Am
Chart (1992)	Peak position
Australian Albums (ARIA)	159
Swedish Albums (Sverigetopplistan)	40
US Billboard 200	92
US Top R&B/Hip-Hop Albums (Billboard)	9

=== Year-end charts ===
Year-end chart performance for The Woman I Am
Chart (1992)	Position
US Top R&B/Hip-Hop Albums (Billboard)	30
