= 6th PMPC Star Awards for Television =

- Date: October 24, 1992
- Location: Metropolitan Theater, Manila
- Hosted by: Bert Marcelo; Eric Quizon

Television/radio coverage
- Network: IBC
- Produced by: Airtime Marketing Philippines, Inc.

The 6th PMPC Star Awards for Television were held at the Metropolitan Theater in Manila on October 24, 1992, and broadcast on IBC Channel 13. The awards night will be hosted by Bert Marcelo and Eric Quizon.

== Nominees ==
These are the nominations for the 6th Star Awards for Television. The winners will be in bold and in the top of the list.

Network	Total # of Nominees
ABS-CBN	56
PTV	21
ABC	15
GMA	48
RPN	29
IBC	13

Network	Total # of Winners (including Special Awards)
ABS-CBN	17
PTV	2
ABC	1
GMA	14
RPN	6
IBC	1

=== Best Station with Balanced Programming ===
- **ABS-CBN 2**
- PTV 4
- ABC 5
- GMA 7
- New Vision 9
- IBC 13

=== Best Drama Series ===
- **Agila (ABS-CBN 2)**
- Anna Luna (ABS-CBN 2)

=== Best Drama Mini Series ===
- **Cebu (RPN 9)**
- **Davao (RPN 9)**

=== Best Drama Special ===
- Araw-Araw Pasko (GMA 7)
- **Lucia (PTV 4)**

=== Best Drama Actress ===
- Gina Alajar (Cebu / RPN 9)
- **Cherie Gil (Cebu / RPN 9)**
- Rosemarie Gil (Cebu / RPN 9)
- Aiko Melendez (Regal Drama Hour Presents: Aiko / IBC 13)
- Coney Reyes (Coney Reyes on Camera / ABS-CBN 2)

=== Best Drama Actor ===
- Michael de Mesa (Cebu / RPN 9)
- **Julio Diaz (Davao / RPN 9)**
- Mark Gil (Cebu / RPN 9)
- Eddie Rodriguez (Davao / RPN 9)
- Joel Torre (Cebu / RPN 9)

=== Best Drama Anthology ===
- Balintawtaw (PTV 4)
- Coney Reyes on Camera (ABS-CBN 2)
- Lovingly Yours, Helen (GMA 7)
- **Maalaala Mo Kaya (ABS-CBN 2)**
- Regal Drama Hour Presents: Aiko (IBC 13)
- Spotlight (GMA 7)

=== Best New TV Personality ===
- Dyan Castillejo (The World Tonight / ABS-CBN 2)
- Eric Fructuoso (Palibhasa Lalake / ABS-CBN 2)
- **Rustom Padilla (Lunch Date / GMA 7)**
- Eagle Riggs (Teysi ng Tahanan / ABS-CBN 2)
- Ariel Rivera (Sa Linggo nAPO Sila / ABS-CBN 2)

=== Best Gag Show ===
- **Mongolian Barbecue (IBC 13)**
- TVJ (IBC 13)

=== Best Comedy Show ===
- Abangan Ang Susunod Na Kabanata (ABS-CBN 2)
- Buddy en Sol (RPN 9)
- **Family 3+1 (GMA 7)**
- Mag-Asawa'y Di Biro (RPN 9)
- Okay Ka Fairy Ko (ABS-CBN 2)

=== Best Comedy Actor ===
- Jaime Fabregas (Mana Mana / ABS-CBN 2)
- Roderick Paulate (Abangan Ang Susunod Na Kabanata / ABS-CBN 2)
- Vic Sotto (Okay Ka Fairy Ko / ABS-CBN 2)
- Dennis Padilla (Mag Asawa'y Di Biro / RPN 9)
- Redford White (Buddy en Sol / RPN 9)
- **Anjo Yllana (Abangan Ang Susunod Na Kabanata / ABS-CBN 2)**

=== Best Comedy Actress ===
- Flora Gasser (Mag Asawa'y Di Biro / RPN 9)
- Carmi Martin (Abangan Ang Susunod Na Kabanata / ABS-CBN 2)
- Cynthia Patag (Palibhasa Lalake / ABS-CBN 2)
- **Caridad Sanchez (Family 3+1 / GMA 7)**
- Tessie Tomas (Abangan Ang Susunod Na Kabanata / ABS-CBN 2)
- Nova Villa (Abangan Ang Susunod Na Kabanata / ABS-CBN 2)

=== Best Musical Variety Show ===
- Awitawanan (IBC 13)
- P.O.P.S.: Pops On Primetime Saturday (ABC 5)
- R.S.V.P. (GMA 7)
- The Sharon Cuneta Show (ABS-CBN 2)
- **Vilma! (GMA 7)**

=== Best Variety Show ===
- Eat Bulaga! (ABS-CBN 2)
- GMA Supershow (GMA 7)
- Lunch Date (GMA 7)
- Sa Linggo nAPO Sila (ABS-CBN 2)
- **Saturday Entertainment (GMA 7)**

=== Best Female TV Host ===
- Sharon Cuneta (The Sharon Cuneta Show / ABS-CBN 2)
- **Pops Fernandez (P.O.P.S.: Pops On Primetime Saturday / ABC 5)**
- Tina Revilla (Lunch Date / GMA 7)
- Vilma Santos (Lunch Date / GMA 7)
- Dawn Zulueta (R.S.V.P. / GMA 7)

=== Best Male TV Host ===
- Herbert Bautista (The Sharon Cuneta Show / ABS-CBN 2)
- German Moreno (GMA Supershow / GMA 7)
- Jim Paredes (Sa Linggo nAPO Sila / ABS-CBN 2)
- Randy Santiago (Lunch Date / GMA 7)
- **Ariel Ureta (R.S.V.P. / GMA 7)**

=== Best Musical Program ===
- A Little Night of Music (GMA 7)
- Concert at the Park (PTV 4)
- Once Upon A Turn Table (IBC 13)
- Paco Park Presents (PTV 4)
- **Ryan Ryan Musikahan (ABS-CBN 2)**

=== Best Musical Program Host ===
- Fides Asencio and John Lesaca (A Little Night of Music / GMA 7)
- Loudette Banson (Paco Park Presents / PTV 4)
- **Ryan Cayabyab (Ryan Ryan Musikahan / ABS-CBN 2)**
- Susan Fernandez-Magno (Concert at the Park / PTV 4)

=== Best Musical Special ===
- Christmas Where You Belong (GMA 7)
- **Joyous Sound of Christmas (RPN 9)**
- Kris Aquino's Birthday Special: Come Into My Life (ABS-CBN 2)
- Silvery Christmas (IBC 13)

=== Best Public Service Program ===
- Bahay Kalinga (ABS-CBN 2)
- Damayan (PTV 4)
- **Eye to Eye (GMA 7)**
- Hotline sa Trese (IBC 13)
- Kapwa Ko Mahal Ko (GMA 7)

=== Best Public Service Program Host ===
- Inday Badiday (Eye to Eye / GMA 7)
- Joseph Estrada and Cory Quirino (Hotline sa Trese / IBC 13)
- Angelique Lazo (Bahay Kalinga / ABS-CBN 2)
- Suzy Pineda and Nonoy Zuñiga (Kapwa Ko Mahal Ko / GMA 7)
- **Rosa Rosal (Damayan / PTV 4)**

=== Best Game Show ===
- **It's A Date (RPN 9)**
- Kuarta o Kahon (RPN 9)
- Play 'N Win (PTV 4)
- Ready, Get Set, Go! (ABS-CBN 2)

=== Best Game Show Host ===
- Patrick Guzman, Eric Quizon and Eagle Riggs (Ready, Get Set, Go! / ABS-CBN 2)
- Eddie Mercado, Ces Quesada and Ruby Rodriguez (Play 'N Win / PTV 4)
- Pepe Pimentel (Kuarta o Kahon / RPN 9)
- **Plinky Recto (It's A Date / RPN 9)**

=== Best Educational Program ===
- Agrisiyete (GMA 7)
- Ating Alamin (PTV 4)
- Beauty School Plus (RPN 9)
- Negosiyete (GMA 7)
- **Telearalan ng Kakayahan (PTV 4)**

=== Best Educational Program Host ===
- Cecille Garrucho (Telearalan ng Kakayahan / PTV 4)
- Gerry Geronimo (Ating Alamin / PTV 4)
- Bert Marcelo (Agrisiyete / GMA 7)
- German Moreno (Negosiyete / GMA 7)
- **Ricky Reyes (Beauty School Plus / RPN 9)**

=== Best Celebrity Talk Show ===
- Martin After Dark (GMA 7)
- **Mel & Jay (ABS-CBN 2)**
- No Nonsense (PTV 4)
- Oh No, It's Johnny! (ABS-CBN 2)
- Stay Awake (ABC 5)

=== Best Celebrity Talk Show Host ===
- Maurice Arcache and Johnny Litton (Oh No, It's Johnny! / ABS-CBN 2)
- Joey de Leon and Jimmy Santos (Stay Awake / ABC 5)
- Margarita Holmes (No Nonsense / PTV 4)
- Martin Nievera (Martin After Dark / GMA 7)
- **Jay Sonza and Mel Tiangco (Mel & Jay / ABS-CBN 2)**

=== Best Magazine Show ===
- 5 and Up (ABC 5)
- The Inside Story (ABS-CBN 2)
- **The Probe Team (GMA 7)**
- Travel Time (GMA 7)

=== Best Magazine Show Host ===
- Satin Abad and Diego Maranan (5 and Up / (ABC 5))
- Cheche Lazaro (The Probe Team / GMA 7)
- **Loren Legarda (The Inside Story / ABS-CBN 2)**
- Susan Medina (Travel Time / GMA 7)

=== Best Cultural Show ===
- For Arts Sake (PTV 4)
- **Tatak Pilipino (ABS-CBN 2)**

=== Best Cultural Show Host ===
- Susan Africa (For Arts Sake / PTV 4)
- **Jim Paredes and Gel Santos-Relos (Tatak Pilipino / ABS-CBN 2)**

=== Best News Program ===
- Balitang Balita (ABC 5)
- The Big News (ABC 5)
- GMA Balita (GMA 7)
- GMA Network News (GMA 7)
- NewsWatch Prime Cast (RPN 9)
- Pangunahing Balita (PTV 4)
- **TV Patrol (ABS-CBN 2)**
- The World Tonight (ABS-CBN 2)

=== Best Male Newscaster ===
- Angelo Castro, Jr. (The World Tonight / ABS-CBN 2)
- Randy David (Balitang Balita / ABC 5)
- Noli de Castro (TV Patrol / ABS-CBN 2)
- Eric Eloriaga (The Big News / ABC 5)
- Leslie Espino (GMA Network News / GMA 7)
- **Frankie Evangelista (TV Patrol / ABS-CBN 2)**
- Harry Gasser (NewsWatch Prime Cast / RPN 9)

=== Best Female Newscaster ===
- Angelique Lazo (TV Patrol / ABS-CBN 2)
- **Loren Legarda (The World Tonight / ABS-CBN 2)**
- Dada Lorenzana (Pangunahing Balita / PTV 4)
- Tina Monzon-Palma (The Big News / ABC 5)
- Korina Sanchez (Saturday World Tonight / ABS-CBN 2)
- Mel Tiangco (TV Patrol / ABS-CBN 2)

=== Best Public Affairs Program ===
- The Big Story (ABC 5)
- **Firing Line (GMA 7)**
- Magandang Gabi, Bayan (ABS-CBN 2)
- Opinions (ABS-CBN 2)
- Tell the People (RPN 9)
- Viewpoint (GMA 7)

=== Best Public Affairs Program Host ===
- Antonio Abaya, Teddy Benigno, Tweetums Gonzalez and Nelson Navarro (Opinions / ABS-CBN 2)
- **Teddy Benigno and Oscar Orbos (Firing Line / GMA 7)**
- Randy David (The Big Story / ABC 5)
- Noli de Castro (Magandang Gabi, Bayan / ABS-CBN 2)
- Dong Puno (Viewpoint / GMA 7)
- Julie Yap-Daza (Tell the People / RPN 9)

=== Best Showbiz Oriented Talk Show ===
- Eye to Eye (GMA 7)
- **Movie Magazine (GMA 7)**
- Sine Silip (IBC 13)

=== Best Showbiz Oriented Program Host ===
- Inday Badiday (Face to Face / GMA 7)
- Letty Celli, Julie Fe Navarro and Oskee Salazar (Sine Silip / IBC 13)
- **Cristy Fermin, Nap Gutierrez and Lulubelle Lam (Movie Magazine / GMA 7)**

=== Best Children Show ===
- 5 and Up (ABC 5)
- Ang Galing Mo Bata (IBC 13)
- **Batibot (ABS-CBN 2)**
- Chikiting Patrol (GMA 7)
- Penpen de Sarapen (RPN 9)
- 'Yan Ang Bata (GMA 7)

=== Best Children Show Host ===
- **Sabine Abad and Diego Silang Maranan (5 and Up / ABC 5)**
- Connie Angeles (Penpen de Sarapen / RPN 9)
- Encar Benedicto ('Yan Ang Bata / GMA 7)
- Sunshine Dizon and Atong Redillas (Ang Galing Mo Bata / IBC 13)
- Maricor Jabolin, Raffy Ticson, Calling Velez and Lionel Yumoll (Chikiting Patrol / GMA 7)
- Sienna Olaso (Batibot / ABS-CBN 2)

=== Best Woman Show ===
- Cooking Up With Nora (ABS-CBN 2)
- **Teysi ng Tahanan (ABS-CBN 2)**
- Woman Watch (PTV 4)
- 'Yan Si Mommy (GMA 7)

=== Best Woman Show Host ===
- Nikki Coseteng (Woman Watch / PTV 4)
- Nora Daza (Cooking Up With Nora / ABS-CBN 2)
- Ces Quesada ('Yan Si Mommy / GMA 7)
- **Tessie Tomas (Teysi ng Tahanan / ABS-CBN 2)**

== Special awards ==
=== Vic Silayan Memorial Award ===
- Pancho Magalona

=== Star Awards for Broadcasting Excellence ===
- Louie Beltran

=== Lifetime Achievement Awards ===
- Nida Blanca
- Helen Vela (Posthumous Award)

== See also ==
- PMPC Star Awards for TV
