= Love of a Lifetime (Chaka Khan song) =

Single by Chaka Khan

from the album Destiny
- B-side: "Coltrane Dreams"
- Released: 1986
- Length: 4:12
- Label: Warner Bros.
- Songwriters: David Gamson; Green Gartside
- Producers: Green Gartside; Arif Mardin

Chaka Khan singles chronology
"Eye to Eye" (1985)	"Love of a Lifetime" (1986)	"Tight Fit" (1986)

"Love of a Lifetime" is a 1986 single by Chaka Khan. The single was the first release from Chaka Khan's Destiny album. "Love of a Lifetime" was written by David Gamson and Green Gartside. Gartside performed backing vocals and also co-produced the single along with Arif Mardin. The music video was filmed on location at Long Island's Adventureland amusement park.

== Chart performance ==
In the UK, "Love of a Lifetime" peaked at No. 52. In the US, the single reached No. 53 on the Hot 100. On other charts, it peaked at No. 21 on the soul singles chart. "Love of a Lifetime" had its best showing on the US dance chart, where it peaked at #11.

Chart (1986)	Peak position
UK Singles (The Official Charts Company)	52
US Billboard Hot 100	53
US Billboard Hot Dance/Disco-Club Play	11
US Billboard Hot Black Singles	21
