= Life Is a Dance: The Remix Project =

1989 remix album by Chaka Khan

Life is a Dance: The Remix Project

Remix album by Chaka Khan
- Released: May 22, 1989
- Recorded: 1978–1989
- Genres: R&B; funk; disco; house
- Length: 75:51 (cassette: 82:03)
- Label: Warner Bros.

Chaka Khan chronology
CK (1988)	Life is a Dance: The Remix Project (1989)	The Woman I Am (1992)

Professional ratings
Review scores
Source	Rating
AllMusic	3/5 stars
Robert Christgau	C+
Number One	3/5 stars
Rolling Stone	2/5 stars

Life Is a Dance: The Remix Project is a remix album of recordings by American R&B/funk singer Chaka Khan, released by the Warner Bros. Records label in 1989. The compilation takes its title from a track included on Khan's 1978 solo debut album Chaka.

== Overview ==
The album, which was released as a double-record set, on CD and as a cassette edition with one extra track, comprises remixes made in the styles of late 1980s dance music genres like house music, hip hop and acid house of tracks originally recorded between the years 1978 and 1984, including two from Rufus & Chaka Khan's final album Stompin' at the Savoy – Live: "Ain't Nobody" and "One Million Kisses".

Life Is a Dance: The Remix Project resulted in three single releases; "I'm Every Woman" ('89 Remix), "Ain't Nobody" ('89 Remix) and "I Feel For You" ('89 Remix). The 1989 remix of "Ain't Nobody" became a #6 hit on the UK Singles Chart while "I'm Every Woman" peaked at #8 hit and Paul Simpson's take on "I Feel for You" peaked at #45. The album itself reached #14 on the UK Albums Chart, making it the best-selling Chaka Khan album in the UK since 1984's I Feel for You. All cuts from the album peaked at number one on the American dance play charts for one week. Life Is a Dance would mark the final time all cuts from an album would make the top spot on the dance play charts.

The Dancin' Danny D. and Frankie Knuckles remixes of "I'm Every Woman" and "Ain't Nobody" were both originally released on the B-side of the US 12" single "Soul Talkin'", taken from Khan's 1988 album ck.

The 1989 remixes of "This Is My Night" and "Eye to Eye" also appear on Warner's 2006 greatest hits compilation The Platinum Collection.

Note: the remixes of the tracks "I Feel for You", "This Is My Night" and "Eye to Eye" appearing on this album should not be confused with the original 12" remixes made in 1984 by the original producers Arif Mardin and Russ Titelman, all of which remain unreleased on CD in both the United States and Europe.

Prince's 1979 original track of "I Feel for You" is sampled shortly in Paul Simpson's remix.

Life Is a Dance: The Remix Project was transferred from vinyl to CD in 1989 and remains in print.

In 1993, Warner Bros. Records re-released the album in Germany and Japan as The Remix Project: Greatest Hits with the inclusion of a house remix of "Love You All My Lifetime", not present on Life Is a Dance: The Remix Project.

== Track listing ==
1. "Life Is a Dance" (David Morales Remix) (Christopher) – 6:38
  - Original version appears on 1978 album Chaka
2. "I Know You, I Live You" (Tony Humphries Remix) (Khan, Mardin) – 7:46
  - Original version appears on 1981 album What Cha' Gonna Do for Me
3. "This Is My Night" (Marley Marl Remix) (Frank, Murphy) – 5:07
  - Original version appears on 1984 album I Feel for You
4. "Eye to Eye" (Paul Simpson Remix) (Freeman, Sembello, Sembello, Sembello) – 8:32
  - Original version appears on 1984 album I Feel for You
5. "Slow Dancin'" by Chaka Khan and Rick James (Eric Sadler & Hank Shocklee Remix) (Netto) – 5:55
  - Original version appears on 1982 album Chaka Khan
6. "Fate" (David Shaw & Winston Jones Remix) (Bugatti, Musker) – 5:38
  - Original version appears on 1981 album What Cha' Gonna Do for Me
7. "I'm Every Woman" (Remix Version By Dancin' Danny D) (Ashford, Simpson) – 8:24
  - Original version appears on 1978 album Chaka
8. "One Million Kisses" (David Shaw & Winston Jones Remix) (Murphy, Osborne) – 5:59
  - Original version appears on Rufus & Chaka Khan's 1983 album Stompin' at the Savoy – Live
9. "Ain't Nobody" by Rufus featuring Chaka Khan (LP Remix Version By Frankie Knuckles) (Wolinski) – 4:42
  - Original version appears on Rufus & Chaka Khan's 1983 album Stompin' at the Savoy – Live
10. "Clouds" (C+C Remix) (Ashford, Simpson) – 7:49
  - Original version appears on 1980 album Naughty
11. "I Feel for You" (Paul Simpson Remix) (Prince) – 8:51
  - Original version appears on 1984 album I Feel for You
12. "Clouds" (6:12) (Classic Trax Version) (Ashford, Simpson) – 6:12
  - Bonus track cassette edition

== Charts ==
=== Weekly charts ===
Chart (1989)	Peak position
Australia Albums (Kent Music Report)	143
Dutch Albums (Album Top 100)	47
European Albums (Music & Media)	54
UK Albums (Official Charts)	14

== Certifications ==
Region	Certification	Certified units/sales
United Kingdom (BPI)	Gold	100,000^{^}
^{^} Shipments figures based on certification alone.

== Production ==
- Arif Mardin – original producer (tracks 1–3, 5–7, 10–11)
- Russ Titelman – original producer (tracks 4, 8, 9)
