= Never Miss the Water =

Single by Chaka Khan
- Released: November 3, 1996
- Recorded: 1995
- Genre: Dance; house
- Length: 4:17
- Songwriters: Gerry DeVeaux; Charlie Mole
- Producer: David Gamson

Chaka Khan singles chronology
"Love You All My Lifetime" (1992)	"Never Miss the Water" (1996)	"Don't Talk 2 Strangers" (1998)

Music video
- "Never Miss the Water" on YouTube

"Never Miss the Water" is a recording written by Gerry DeVeaux and Charlie Mole, and performed by American singer Chaka Khan in 1995. It features vocals by Meshell Ndegeocello and had previously been unreleased. The song was included in Khan's 1996 greatest hits album Epiphany: The Best of Chaka Khan, Vol. 1 and went to number 36 on the US Billboard Hot R&B/Hip-Hop Singles & Tracks chart. On the Billboard Hot Dance Club Play chart, "Never Miss the Water" was Chaka Khan's sixth number-one single, and was her last until she again reached the summit with "Disrespectful" in 2007.

== Critical reception ==
Larry Flick from Billboard magazine wrote, "No one can kick like Chaka—and she does it with such astonishing ease. She shines like the diva she is on one of the five new songs on Epiphany: The Best Of Chaka Khan. Produced by David Gamson, the track cruises at a breezy classic funk pace, giving Miss Thing plenty of room to work her voice to maximum effect. She is bolstered by a guest rap from Me'Shell Ndegéocello, whose chatting between verses adds street spice. The original version sparkles with multiformat hit potential, while Frankie Knuckles comes to the party with a rousing house remix that will have Khan's legion of club disciples twirling with delight."

British magazine Music Week complimented "Never Miss the Water" as a "strong" track. Ralph Tee from the magazine's RM wrote, "It's not an 'I'm Every Woman' or 'Ain't Nobody', but vocally Chaka still puts virtually every one else to shame."

== Charts ==
Chart performance for "Never Miss the Water"
Chart (1997)	Peak position
Scotland (OCC)	69
UK Singles (OCC)	59
UK Dance (OCC)	26
US Bubbling Under Hot 100 (Billboard)	2
US Hot Dance Club Play (Billboard)	1
US Hot R&B/Hip-Hop Singles & Tracks (Billboard)	36

== Cover versions ==
In 2003, a cover version credited to Gerry DeVeaux, Shauna Jensen, Robyn Loau and Michal Nicolas was released in Australia as the official anthem for the Sydney Gay & Lesbian Mardi Gras.

== See also ==
- List of number-one dance singles of 1997 (U.S.)
