= Eye to Eye (talk show) =

Philippine television talk show

- Title card
- Genre: Talk show
- Directed by: Dixie Alviz
- Presented by: Inday Badiday
- Opening theme: "Eye to Eye" by Chaka Khan
- Country of origin: Philippines
- Original language: Tagalog

Production
- Executive producers: Bo Palomo; Flor Aquino
- Camera setup: Multiple-camera setup
- Running time: 30–60 minutes
- Production companies: LOCA-LOBO Productions; GMA News and Public Affairs

Original release
- Network: GMA Network
- Release: January 11, 1988 – August 9, 1996

Eye to Eye is a Philippine television talk show broadcast by GMA Network. Hosted by Inday Badiday, it premiered on January 11, 1988. In 1991, the show was expanded into one hour and it was reformatted to include a public service portion. The show concluded on August 9, 1996.

== Hosts ==
- Inday Badiday

Segment hosts

- Nap Gutierrez (also served as substitute host)
- Alfie Lorenzo

Substitute hosts

- Kris Aquino
- Janice de Belen
- Cristy Fermin
- Sharon Cuneta

== Accolades ==
Accolades received by Eye to Eye
Year	Award	Category	Recipient	Result	Ref.
1988	2nd PMPC Star Awards for Television	Best Movie Talk Show	Eye to Eye	Nominated	
1988	2nd PMPC Star Awards for Television	Best Movie Talk Show Host	Inday Badiday	Nominated	
1992	6th PMPC Star Awards for Television	Best Public Service Show	Eye to Eye	Won	
1992	6th PMPC Star Awards for Television	Best Public Service Program Host	Inday Badiday	Nominated	
