= Epiphany: The Best of Chaka Khan, Vol. 1 =

1996 compilation album by Chaka Khan

Greatest hits album by Chaka Khan
- Released: November 12, 1996
- Recorded: 1978–1995
- Length: 73:30
- Label: Warner Bros.

Chaka Khan chronology
The Woman I Am (1992)	Epiphany: The Best of Chaka Khan, Vol. 1 (1996)	Come 2 My House (1998)

Singles from Epiphany: The Best of Chaka Khan, Vol. 1
- 1. "Never Miss the Water" Released: November 3, 1996

Epiphany: The Best of Chaka Khan, Vol. 1 is a compilation album of recordings by American R&B/funk singer Chaka Khan, first released on the Warner Bros. Records label in 1996. Although the compilation, which reached #22 on Billboard's R&B chart and #84 on Pop, was given the "Vol. 1" tag, it remains without a sequel to date.

The compilation would be re-issued by Warner's sublabel Reprise Records in 1999 with alternative cover art under the title I'm Every Woman - The Best of Chaka Khan. The collection was again re-issued as Epiphany: The Best of Chaka Khan, Vol. 1 in 2005, then also on the Reprise label.

== Background ==
After an at the time 23-year-long career in the music business which spanned over seventeen studio albums (nine solo, eight with the band Rufus) and a combined total of some fifty entries on Billboard's R&B singles chart, Epiphany was the first best of retrospective to be released, then summarising her recorded output in ten tracks; eight solo hits such as "I'm Every Woman", "I Feel for You", "I Know You, I Live You" and "Through The Fire", combined with two recordings from the Rufus era, "Ain't Nobody" and "Tell Me Something Good".

The Epiphany compilation is however mainly notable for including six tracks from what was originally intended to be Khan's tenth solo album, Dare You To Love Me, recorded between the years 1993 and 1995. Titles from the postponed and eventually cancelled album featured on the Epiphany compilation include "Love Me Still" (co-written by Bruce Hornsby, first released on the soundtrack to the 1995 Spike Lee movie Clockers), Khan's reggae-tinged cover version of Fleetwood Mac's "Everywhere", the duet "Never Miss the Water" with Me'shell Ndegéocello, "Somethin' Deep", "Your Love Is All I Know" and "Every Little Thing". A seventh title, "It Ain't Easy Lovin' Me", was released as an exclusive bonus track on the Japanese edition of Epiphany: The Best of Chaka Khan: Vol. 1.

Another seven recordings from the Dare You To Love Me sessions have surfaced on movie soundtracks, compilations or other artists' albums; "Miles Blowin'" (a tribute to the late Miles Davis, included on the Sugar Hill soundtrack, 1994), "Free Yourself" (on the To Wong Foo, Thanks for Everything! Julie Newmar soundtrack, 1995), "Don't Take Back Your Love" (on Gerry DeVeaux's album Devoted Songs, 1996), Khan's recording of the jazz standard "My Funny Valentine" (on the Waiting to Exhale soundtrack, 1996), "Pain" (co-written by Prince, on the soundtrack to TV sitcom Living Single, 1997), "You And I Are One" and "Power" (both on the 1998 Zebra Records compilation A Song A Day). Three further recordings from the Dare You To Love Me sessions, including the title track, officially remain unreleased.

== Promotion ==
The Epiphany compilation was promoted by the single release "Never Miss The Water" which included house and drum & bass remixes by Frankie Knuckles, Stylus Production and Candy Station. The single, issued on the Reprise Records label, became a #1 hit on Billboard's Dance Chart and also reached #36 on R&B. "Your Love Is All I Know", "Every Little Thing" and "Everywhere" were also released as singles in certain territories, such as the UK, Germany and Japan.

== Critical reception ==
Professional ratings
Review scores
Source	Rating
AllMusic	4/5 stars
Robert Christgau	A−
Muzik	9/10

AllMusic editor Andy Kellman wrote that "it is clear that any one-disc attempt at wrapping up the highlights is bound to work more like a sampler than a true best-of." He was frustrated that "previously unreleased songs take the place of missing classics like "Sweet Thing," "Clouds," "Fate," "Close the Door," and "Stay." Nonetheless, the disc does contain Khan's most popular work [...] At the absolute least, Khan deserves a solo-only best-of, as well as a disc that sticks strictly to her work with Rufus." In his review for The Village Voice, Robert Christgau wrote: "Of her enormous gift there's no question – not just a sumptuous voice, those are commonplace, but sonic character. She sounds somehow nasal, sensuous, and "trained" all at once, like Sarah Vaughan with adenoids, and also with the rhythmic hots [...] But Luther Vandross, Melle Mel, Bird 'n' Diz, even Billie Holiday – these tributes and collaborations she's been equal to."

== Commercial performance ==
Epiphany: The Best of Chaka Khan, Vol. 1 debuted and peaked at number 82 on the US Billboard 200 in the week of November 30, 1996. The same week, it opened and peaked at number 22 on Billboard's Top R&B/Hip-Hop Albums chart. On April 11, 2005, the album was certified Gold by the Recording Industry Association of America (RIAA) for shipments figures in excess of 500,000 copies. By February 2008, Epiphany: The Best of Chaka Khan, Vol. 1 had sold 796,000 units in the United States, according to Nielsen SoundScan. On May 10, 2019, the album was certified Silver by the British Phonographic Industry (BPI). In January 2024, it reached Gold status in the United Kingdom.

== Track listing ==
Epiphany: The Best of Chaka Khan, Vol. 1 track listing
No.	Title	Writer(s)	Producer(s)	Length
1.	"Ain't Nobody"	David "Hawk" Wolinski	Russ Titelman	4:41
2.	"Papillon (a.k.a. Hot Butterfly)"	Gregg Diamond	Arif Mardin	4:08
3.	"Tell Me Something Good" (live)	Stevie Wonder	Titelman	3:35
4.	"I Feel for You" (featuring Stevie Wonder and Melle Mel)	Prince	Mardin	5:46
5.	"I Know You, I Live You"	Chaka Khan; Mardin	Mardin	4:02
6.	"I'm Every Woman"	Ashford & Simpson	Mardin	4:08
7.	"Love Me Still"	Khan; Bruce Hornsby	David Gamson	3:28
8.	"The End of a Love Affair"	Edward C. Redding	Titelman	5:13
9.	"And the Melody Still Lingers On (A Night in Tunisia)" (featuring Dizzy Gillespie)	Gillespie; Frank Paparelli; Khan; Mardin	Mardin	5:00
10.	"Through the Fire"	David Foster; Tom Keane; Cynthia Weil	Foster; Humberto Gatica; Mardin^{[a]}	4:47
11.	"What Cha' Gonna Do for Me"	Hamish Stuart; Ned Doheny	Mardin	2:27
12.	"Everywhere"	Christine McVie	Andre Betts; Gamson	4:52
13.	"Never Miss the Water" (featuring Me'shell Ndegéocello)	Gerry DeVeaux; Charlie Mole	Gamson	4:46
14.	"Somethin' Deep"	Khan; Kipper Jones; Keith Crouch	Keith Crouch	4:58
15.	"Your Love Is All I Know"	Jud Friedman; Allan Rich; Chris Walker	Mardin	4:35
16.	"Every Little Thing"	DeVeaux; Gamson; Khan; Dave Thomas	Gamson	5:12
Total length:				73:30

Japanese bonus track
No.	Title	Writer(s)	Original album	Length
17.	"It Ain't Easy Lovin' Me"	Gamson; Olivier Leiber; Khan; Allen Cato	Gamson	4:26
Total length:				77:56

Notes

- ^{^[a]} denotes vocal producer(c)

== Personnel & production 1993-1995 recordings ==
"Love Me Still" (1995)

- Bruce Hornsby - piano, musical arrangement
- David Gamson - record producer
- Chaka Khan - producer, executive producer

"Everywhere" (1995)

- David Gamson - keyboards, drum machine
- Raymond Chue - Fender Rhodes
- Vere Isaac - bass guitar
- Allen Cato - guitar
- Paul Jackson Jr. - guitar
- David Gamson - producer
- Andre Betts - producer
- Bob Power - sound mix at Enterprise Studios

"Never Miss The Water" (1995)

- David Gamson - keyboards, drum machine, producer, recording engineer
- Me'shell Ndegéocello - additional vocals, bass guitar
- Federico Gonzales Peña - Fender Rhodes, piano
- Luis Conte - percussion
- Wah Wah Watson - guitar
- Allen Cato - guitar
- Olivier Leiber - guitar
- Benjamin Wright - string arrangement
- Charles Veal - concertmaster
- Bob Power - sound mix at Enterprise Studios
- Rail Rogut - recording engineer

"Somethin' Deep" (1995)

- Keith Crouch - all other instruments
- Derrick Edmondson - saxophone solo, horn arrangement
- Stephen Baxter - trombone
- John Fumo - trumpet
- Roy Pennon - bass guitar soloist
- Bob Power - sound mix at Enterprise Studios
- Rail Rogut - recording engineer

"Your Love Is All I Know" (1993)

- Steve Skinner - keyboards, synthesizer, arranger
- Chieli Minucci - guitar
- Arif Mardin - producer, arranger
- Howard McCrary - background vocals
- Micheal O'Reilly - mix at Right Track Recording, NY, recording engineer
- Carl Nappa - assistant engineer
- Jason Goldstein - assistant engineer
- Recorded at The New Hit Factory, NY
- Gloria Gabriel - production coordinator

"Every Little Thing" (1993)

- David Gamson - producer, keyboards, drum machine
- Norman Brown - guitar
- Me'shell Ndegeocello - bass guitar
- Federico Gonzalez Pena - piano, Fender Rhodes
- Chris Botti - trumpet, flugelhorn
- Micheal O'Reilly - mix at Right Track Recording, NY, recording engineer
- Carl Nappa - assistant engineer
- Jason Goldstein - assistant engineer
- Recorded at The New Hit Factory, NY
- Gloria Gabriel - production coordinator

== Non-album tracks and remixes ==
- "Never Miss The Water" (Franktified Club Mix) - 9:56
- "Never Miss The Water" (The Classic Single)
- "Never Miss The Water" (Frankie's Sunday Mix) - 11:07
- "Never Miss The Water" (Dubjay's Duhlite) - 10:13
- "Never Miss The Water" (The Holywater Drum & Bass Mix) - 8:03
- "Never Miss The Water" (TV Mix) - 4:06
- "Never Miss The Water" (Deeper Mix) - 9:00
- "Never Miss The Water" (Deeper Dub) - 7:44
- "Never Miss The Water" (Extended Album Version) - 6:12
- "Never Miss The Water" (Lewis & Rich Mix) - 6:33
- "Never Miss The Water" (Stylus' Remix, Radio Edit) - 3:56
- "Never Miss The Water" (Stylus' Club Anthem) - 6:45
- "Never Miss The Water" (Stylus' Anthem Dub) - 6:52
- "Never Miss The Water" (Stylus' Street Mix) - 5:48
- "Never Miss The Water" (Stylus' Straight Pass Through) - 5:34
- "Never Miss The Water" (Stylus' Remix Instrumental) - 6:18
- "Never Miss The Water (A Cappella) - 4:28
- "Miles Blowin'" (Tina Harris, Ashley Hall) - 3:56
- "Miles Blowin'" (Disco 9000 Mix) - 6:02
- "Miles Blowin'" (Afro Cube Mix) - 5:32
- "Miles Blowin'" (Vinyl Republic Dub) - 5:58
- "Free Yourself" (Sami McKinney, Denise Rich, Warren McRae) - 4:13
- "Don't Take Back Your Love" (Gerry Deveaux) - 5:40
- "My Funny Valentine" (Richard Rodgers, Lorenz Hart) - 4:06
- "Pain" (Prince/N. Channison Berry) - 5:24
- "You And I Are One" (Howard McCreary, Chaka Khan) - 5:19
- "Power" (Howard McCreary, Chaka Khan) - 3:57

== Charts ==
Weekly chart performance for Epiphany: The Best of Chaka Khan, Vol. 1
Chart (1996)	Peak position
Australian Albums (ARIA)	125
US Billboard 200	84
US Top R&B/Hip-Hop Albums (Billboard)	22

== Certifications ==
Certifications for Epiphany: The Best of Chaka Khan, Vol. 1
Region	Certification	Certified units/sales
United Kingdom (BPI)	Gold	100,000^{‡}
United States (RIAA)	Gold	500,000^{^}
^{^} Shipments figures based on certification alone.^{‡} Sales+streaming figures based on certification alone.

== Release history ==
Release dates and formats for Epiphany: The Best of Chaka Khan, Vol. 1
Region	Date	Edition	Label	Ref.
United States	November 12, 1996	Standard	Warner Bros.	
United States	November 26, 2001	I'm Every Woman – The Best of Chaka Khan reissue	Reprise	
United States	March 15, 2005	Reissue	Reprise	
