= Superman III (soundtrack) =

Superman III: Original Motion Picture Soundtrack

Soundtrack album by Various artists
- Released: 1983
- Genre: Soundtrack
- Label: Warner Bros.

Professional ratings
Review scores
Source	Rating
Allmusic	1.5/5 stars

Superman III: Original Motion Picture Soundtrack, based on the film Superman III, features contributions by Ken Thorne and various artists and was released in 1983. A CD of this album coupled with the Superman II album was released in Japan.

== Background ==
As with the Superman II, the musical score was composed and conducted by Ken Thorne. It makes use of the 'Superman theme' and most other themes from the first film composed by John Williams. Part of the score was ghost-written by Edward Gregson. To capitalize on the popularity of synthesizer pop, Giorgio Moroder was hired to create songs for the film, though their use in the film is minimal.

== Release ==
The score for the film was released in 1983.

A 3-disc fully expanded limited edition of the film's score, along with the extended score for Superman II, was released in the expanded archival collection by La-La Land Records as part of Superman's 80th anniversary in October 2018.

== Content ==
Superman III was the first of the films to have a score and soundtrack on the same release. Side A was devoted to 20 minutes of Ken Thorne's score (including new material such as a comedic cue that corresponds with the opening slapstick sequence, a theme for Richard Pryor's character, Gus Gorman, and the climactic fight between Clark Kent and Evil Superman).

Side B was devoted to music by Giorgio Moroder. He specifically contributed a synthesized version of the main title march from Superman II, although it wasn't used in the film. He also created a new love theme for Clark and Lana Lang and contributed three other songs that appear mostly as instrumentals in the film, the most prominent being "They Won't Get Me" for Roger Miller, which is heard twice during Gus' presence in Smallville.

== Track listing ==
The track listing on the soundtrack album is as follows:

1. "Main Title (The Streets of Metropolis)" (5:23)
2. "Saving the Factory—The Acid Test" (6:09)
3. "Gus Finds a Way" (0:58)
4. "The Two Faces of Superman" (2:50)
5. "The Struggle Within—Final Victory" (4:16)
6. "Rock On" – Marshall Crenshaw (3:35)
7. "No See, No Cry" – Chaka Khan (3:18)
8. "They Won't Get Me" – Roger Miller (3:20)
9. "Love Theme" – Helen St. John (3:14)
10. "Main Title March" – Giorgio Moroder (4:20)

== Additional music ==
"Roll Over Beethoven" by the Beatles (a 1963 remake of Chuck Berry's hit) and "Earth Angel" by the Penguins can be heard at Clark's high school reunion. A rare instance of the Beatles granting use of their music in a non-Beatles film, the three surviving members granted permission due to their friendship with director Richard Lester, who had directed their first two films.

Like the use of "Rock Around the Clock" in the first film, the use of the 1950s-era "Earth Angel" recording appears anachronistic for the "Class of 1965" reunion. John Philip Sousa's "King Cotton" military march and the traditional Italian standard "When Your Mama Made You" are heard later in the film.
