= Teodoro Benigno =

Filipino journalist

- Born: Teodoro C. Benigno, Jr. May 18, 1923; Philippine Islands
- Died: June 3, 2005 (aged 82); Quezon City, Philippines
- Occupations: Journalist, writer
- Years active: 1946–2005
- Spouse: Dominga "Meng" Comsti-Benigno

Teodoro "Teddy" Benigno, Jr. (May 18, 1923 – June 3, 2005) was a leading Filipino journalist with a career spanning seven decades. His writings first graced the print media in 1946, when he joined the Manila Tribune as a sportswriter and police beat reporter. However, the greater part of his career was spent with the Agence France Presse, which he joined as a senior editor in 1950. He would spend 37 years with the AFP, serving as Manila bureau chief from 1962 until 1987. Benigno maintained extensive ties with France. Fluent in French, he studied at the Institut des Sciences Politiques and was awarded the French Legion of Honor in 1989.

== Career ==
After President Ferdinand Marcos declared martial law in 1972, Benigno and other foreign journalists established the Foreign Correspondents Association of the Philippines, which proved a welcome balancing force to the Marcos-controlled media during martial rule. Benigno himself, unlike many other prominent anti-Marcos journalists such as Max Soliven and Don Chino Roces avoided imprisonment during Marcos's rule, shielded perhaps in part by his affiliation with a prominent international news organization as the AFP was.

In 1987, Benigno accepted President Corazon Aquino's offer to serve as her press secretary. He held the position until 1989, when he resigned to return to journalism. In June 1989, he began his famous column "Here's the Score", published by the Philippine Star. Benigno would also venture into broadcast journalism by hosting two public-affairs talk shows. The first, "Options" on the ABS-CBN channel, was short-lived. However, his succeeding show, "Firing Line" on the GMA channel, would prove durable and eventually attain international recognition. "Firing Line" deviated from the then popular round-table format adopted by most Philippine talk shows. It employed instead a format involving Benigno and his co-host grilling for an hour a solitary guest, normally a leading Filipino political figure of the day like Miriam Defensor-Santiago in 1992, but sometimes the occasional foreign dignitary such as Margaret Thatcher, Henry Kissinger, Willy Brandt, and Zbigniew Brzezinski. Benigno's co-hosts were also, as he was, former Aquino government officials - first, Executive Secretary Oscar Orbos, then eventually, economic planning secretary Solita Monsod. After "Firing Line" was ended coinciding his retirement from television in 1999, Benigno continued to write his column with the Philippine Star, which was regularly published for nearly sixteen years up until weeks before his death.

Benigno employed a highly literary style, replete with flowery descriptions and emphatic denunciations. His emotive style contrasted sharply with the dry stylings of Amado Doronila, another contemporary of equal stature who writes for the Star's fiercest rival, the Philippine Daily Inquirer. Benigno's writing style became especially pointed in the last few years of his life, as he emerged as a bitter critic of Presidents Joseph Estrada and Gloria Macapagal Arroyo. He was frequently heard to lament the failings of the restored democratic rule, and became active in controversial reformist movements.

== Personal life ==
He was married to Dominga "Meng" Comsti-Benigno (May 12, 1925 – December 13, 2010), with whom he had a daughter, Aurora Magdalena "Nena" C. Benigno. At a later time, he had a son named Marc Theodore by Luz Palacios.

== Death ==
Benigno died on June 3, 2005, less than a month after being diagnosed with liver cancer. Former President Corazon Aquino, with whom he retained a close personal friendship, was one of his last bedside visitors.

== Television ==
- The World Today (GMA 7, 1972–1974)
- Options (ABS-CBN 2, 1991–1995)
- Firing Line (GMA 7, 1992–1999)
