= ClassiKhan =

2004 studio album by Chaka Khan

Studio album by Chaka Khan
- Released: October 5, 2004
- Length: 46:50
- Label: Sanctuary
- Producers: Eve Nelson; Ira Schickman

Chaka Khan chronology
Dance Classics of Chaka Khan (1999)	ClassiKhan (2004)	The Platinum Collection (2006)

ClassiKhan is the tenth studio album by American singer Chaka Khan, featuring the London Symphony Orchestra. It was released by independent label Sanctuary Records on October 5, 2004 in United Kingdom, with international releases overseen by different record companies. Produced and arranged by Eve Nelson, ClassiKhan was mainly recorded at London's legendary Abbey Road Studios and features guest appearances by pianist Joe Sample and percussionist Sheila E., among others.

== Background ==
While ClassiKhan does focus on jazz and swing standards, among them "Stormy Weather", "Hazel's Hips", "'Round Midnight" and "Teach Me Tonight", it also features an eclectic selection of classics from other genres, including pop culture favourites such as Broadway show tune "Hey Big Spender" from the musical Sweet Charity, Peggy Lee's "Is That All There Is?" penned by Leiber & Stoller and even a '60s country-and-western classic in the form of Patsy Cline's "Crazy", written by Willie Nelson. ClassiKhan also features the themes of film favourites from Khan's youth, "To Sir With Love" and the James Bond themes "Goldfinger" and "Diamonds Are Forever". The collection concludes with one new composition, the ballad "I Believe", co-written by Khan and the album's producer Ira Shickman.

The album was mainly recorded at London's legendary Abbey Road Studios and it features guest appearances by, among others, pianist Joe Sample and percussionist Sheila E., best known for her work with Prince. The title ClassiKhan is also a reference to Khan's accompaniment on the set. Whereas on the Echoes of an Era album Khan used a five-piece all-star jazz ensemble, on ClassiKhan she is accompanied by The New York All Star Musicians – but with the addition of the full London Symphony Orchestra, conducted and arranged by Eve Nelson and with orchestrations by producer Ira Schickman and Gary Anderson.

== Critical reception ==
Professional ratings
Review scores
Source	Rating
AllMusic	3.5/5 stars
Slant	3.5/5 stars

AllMusic editor Andy Kellman felt that "while it's true that many of these songs [...] have been worn out by so many other renditions of varying quality, Khan injects plenty of her tirelessly singular personality. Most thrilling of all is a pair of nods to Shirley Bassey, John Barry, and James Bond [...] The only obvious problem with the disc is its title. Longtime Khan fans are likely to glance at the cover of the disc and see it as another career retrospective – or, at most, re-recordings of the singer's old material — that they don't need to hear. That's clearly not the case here." Eric Henderson from Slant Magazine rated the album two and a half stars out of five. He found that "not one single standard is given a novel twist, and each arrangement seems to have the exact same crescendos and ritardandos." He further noted: "Even worse, the production of Classikhan is so sparkling clean and the homogenization of the London Orchestra’s various sections so democratically Teflonesque that even listeners whose entire CD collection is made up of Original Broadway Cast Recordings would find themselves struggling to stay interested."

== Commercial performance ==
ClassiKhan reached number 42 on Billboard's US Top R&B/Hip-Hop Albums chart. By 2005, it had sold 46,000 copies in the United States, according to Nielsen SoundScan.

== Track listing ==
ClassiKhan track listing
No.	Title	Writer(s)	Producer(s)	Length
1.	"Hey Big Spender"	Cy Coleman; Dorothy Fields	Eve Nelson; Chaka Khan^{[a]}	3:18
2.	"Hazel's Hips"	Oscar Brown	Nelson; Khan^{[a]}	2:59
3.	"Best Is Yet to Come"	Carolyn Leigh; Cy Coleman	Nelson; Khan^{[a]}	4:42
4.	"Crazy"	Willie Nelson	Nelson; Khan^{[a]}	3:09
5.	"I'm in the Mood for Love"	Dorothy Fields; Jimmy McHugh	Nelson; Khan^{[a]}	3:47
6.	"Is That All There Is?"	Jerry Leiber and Mike Stoller	Nelson; Khan^{[a]}	3:58
7.	"Stormy Weather"	Harold Arlen; Ted Koehler	Nelson; Khan^{[a]}	4:37
8.	"'Round Midnight"	Bernard Hanighen; Charles "Cootie" Williams; Thelonious Monk	Nelson; Khan^{[a]}	4:30
9.	"Teach Me Tonight"	Gene de Paul; Sammy Cahn	Nelson; Khan^{[a]}	4:11
10.	"To Sir with Love"	Donald Black; Mark London	Nelson; Khan^{[a]}; Ray Cervenka^{[a]}	4:23
11.	"Diamonds Are Forever"	Donald Black; John Barry	Nelson; Khan^{[a]}	3:02
12.	"Goldfinger"	Anthony Newley; John Barry; Leslie Bricusse	Nelson; Khan^{[a]}	3:08
13.	"I Believe"	Khan; Ira Schickman	Schickman	3:34
Total length:				46:50

Japanese bonus track
No.	Title	Writer(s)	Producer(s)	Length
14.	"To Sir with Love" (Barry Harris Club Mix)	Black; London	Nelson; Khan^{[a]}; Cervenka^{[a]}; Barry Harris^{[b]}	8:56

Notes

- ^{^[a]} denotes additional producer(s)
- ^{^[b]} denotes remix producer(s)

== Personnel ==
Performers and musicians

- Chaka Khan – vocals
- Andy Snitzer – clarinet, alto saxophone, tenor saxophone
- Charles Pillow – clarinet, oboe, alto saxophone
- Joe Sample – piano
- Eve Nelson – piano (track: 13)
- Sheila E. – percussion (tracks: 4, 6, 10 to 12)
- Jay Anderson – acoustic bass
- Ray Cervenka – bass (track: 10)
- Kevin Kuhn – acoustic guitar, electric guitar
- Dennis Mackrel – drums
- Lee Musiker – piano
- New York All Star Musicians – performers
- London Symphony Orchestra – orchestra
- Roger Rosenberg – bassoon, bass clarinet, baritone saxophone
- Timothy Ries – flute, tenor & alto saxophone
- Ann Elisworth – French horn
- Chris Komar – French horn
- John Clark Sr. – French horn
- Karen Vaughan – harp (principal)
- David Jackson – percussion (principal)
- Dennis Anderson – tenor saxophone, clarinet
- David Pietro – alto & tenor saxophone, flute
- Nigel Thomas – timpani (principal)
- M. Birch Johnson – trombone
- Michael Davis – trombone
- George – bass & tenor trombone
- Dave Stahl – trumpet
- James Hynes – trumpet
- Anthony Kadleck – trumpet
- Carmine Lauri – first violin, leader
- Caroline O-Neill – violin (first)
- Claire Parfitt – violin (first)
- Colin Renwick – violin (first)
- Ginette Decuyper – violin (first)
- Gordon McKay – violin (first)
- Harriet Rayfield – violin (first)
- Ian Rhodes – violin (first)
- Jorg Hammann – violin (first)
- Maxine Kwok – violin (first)
- Michael Humphrey – violin (first)
- Nicholas Wright – violin (first)
- Nicole Wilson – violin (first)
- Nigel Broadbent – violin (first)
- Robin Brightman – violin (first)
- Sylvain Vasseur – violin (first)
- Evgeny Grach – violin (second, principal)
- Andrew Pollock – violin (second)
- Belinda McFarlane – violin (second)
- David Ballesteros – violin (second)
- Ian McDonough – violin (second)
- Louise Shackelton – violin (second)
- Matthew Gardner – violin (second)
- Norman Clarke – violin (second)
- Paul Robson – violin (second)
- Richard Blayden – violin (second)
- Sarah Quinn – violin (second)
- Stephen Rowlinson – violin (second)
- Tammy Se – violin (second)
- Tiberiu Buta – violin (second)
- Paul Silvethorne – viola (principal)
- Gillianne Haddow – viola (co-principal)
- Duff Burns – viola
- Elisabeth Varlow – viola
- Gina Zagni – viola
- Jonathan Welch – viola
- Peter Norriss – viola
- Regina Beukes – viola
- Robert Turner – viola
- Moray Welsh – cello (principal)
- Rebecca Gilliver – cello (co-principal)
- Francis Saunders – cello
- Hilary Jones – cello
- Jennifer Brown – cello
- Nicholas Gethin – cello
- Noel Bradshaw – cello
- Ray Adams – cello

Technical

* Eve Nelson – record producer, musical arranger, orchestral conductor
- Ira Schickman – writer producer (track: 13)
- Chaka Khan – additional production, executive producer
- Stu Ric – executive producer
- Tammy McCrary – executive producer
- Bernadette O'Reilly – Project Supervisor (Production Company) Nelson-O'Reilly Productions
- Ray Cervenka – additional production and Pro Tools editor (all tracks except:9 )
- Joe Sample – piano arrangement (tracks: 7 to 9)
- Arnold Mischkulnig – Pro Tools editor
- Andy Sntizer – Pro Tools editor (track: 9)
- Gary Anderson – musical arranger (track: 5), orchestrator (tracks: 4, 5, 10, 12), copyist, music preparation, New York All Star Musicians contractor, additional score preparation (tracks: 7 to 9)
- Shari Feder – orchestrator (tracks: 1 to 3, 6, 11)
- Alan Silverman – audio mastering
- Cynthia Daniels – audio mixing, recording
- Drew Griffiths – assistant engineer
- Raymond McKinley – assistant engineer
- Sam O'Kell – assistant engineer
- Recorded at Abbey Road Studios, London; Whitfield Street Studios, London; Clinton Recording, NYC and Blue 52 Studio.
- Mixed at Old Stone Studios.
- Additional editing at 22nd St. Street Studios.
- Mastered at ARFI Digital Studios, NYC, NY.
- Norman Scott – photography
- Giulio Costanzo – art direction, design

== Charts ==
Weekly chart performance for ClassiKhan
Chart (2004)	Peak position
US Top R&B/Hip-Hop Albums (Billboard)	43

== Release history ==
ClassiKhan release history
Region	Date	Format(s)	Label
Japan	October 5, 2004	Digital download; CD	JVC Victor
United Kingdom	October 5, 2004	Digital download; CD	Sanctuary Records
United States	October 5, 2004	Digital download; CD	Earthsong; AgU Music Group
