= Inday Badiday =

Filipino talk show host (1944-2003)

- Born: Maria Lourdes Jimenez; August 6, 1944; Balingasag, Misamis Oriental, Republic of the Philippines
- Died: September 26, 2003 (aged 59); Quezon City, Philippines
- Resting place: Manila Memorial Park, Parañaque, Metro Manila
- Other names: Ate Luds; Inday Badiday; Ludy
- Occupations: Host, journalist
- Years active: 1970–2003
- Spouse: Ernie Carvajal
- Relatives: Letty Jimenez Magsanoc (sister); IC Mendoza (grandson)

Maria Lourdes Jimenez-Carvajal (August 6, 1944 – September 26, 2003), popularly known as Inday Badiday, was a Filipino TV host and journalist who was known as Philippine television's "queen of showbiz talk shows" and "queen of intrigues".

== Biography ==
The name Inday Badiday (English: Flamboyant Girl) was coined by her mother Lala, from the word “Inday” as “Girly” and “Badiday” as “Gay (Bading) or Flamboyant”, referring to the titillating nature of the gossip industry.

Her commentary and knowledge about the industry eventually brought her fame. She was also known for her charitable TV segment announcing lost or kidnapped children on her media platforms. She is also a columnist for different showbiz and movie magazines Eyebugs: Bigay Hilig sa Balitang Showbiz, Modern Romances and Tsismis.

One of her first shows was Nothing but the Truth and later See-True and Eye to Eye, which served as Philippine television's template for showbiz talk shows. These shows were all produced by GMA News and Public Affairs and her production company, LoCa Productions (LoCa is the combination of the first two letters of her names, Lourdes Carvajal).

In July 2000, she made her television comeback on RPN with The Truth and Nothing But, and she returned to GMA Network in 2002 for her last show Inday Heart to Heart.

== Death ==
Inday Badiday died on September 26, 2003, aged 59 years old, from multiple organ failure due to two strokes at St. Luke's Medical Center – Quezon City. She was the former spouse of costume and makeup artist, Ernie Carvajal, who had three children and was the grandmother of IC Mendoza.

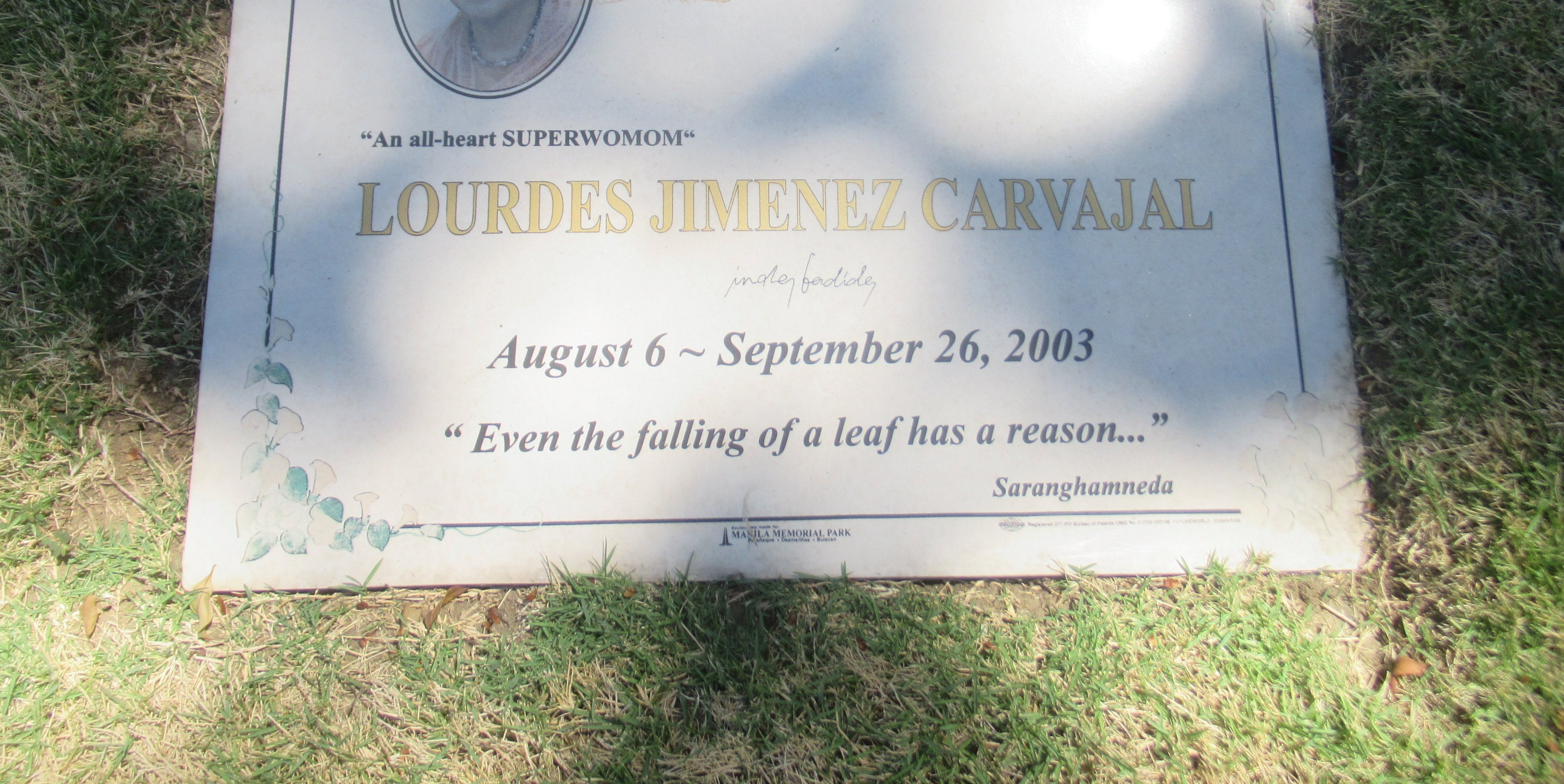
Carvajal's grave at Manila Memorial Park – Sucat.

On April 1, 2004, GMA Network's drama anthology Magpakailanman aired her life story. To pay respect, Angelu de Leon played the role (aside from this, the actual props from her former shows, such as See True and Eye to Eye, were used). In later years, her image became iconic due to her baritone or “raspy” voice on both radio and television.
