= Ck (album) =

1988 studio album by Chaka Khan

ck

Studio album by Chaka Khan
- Released: November 22, 1988
- Recorded: January–September 1988
- Genre: R&B
- Length: 49:26
- Label: Warner Bros.
- Producers: Russ Titelman; David Frank; Chaka Khan; Prince; Chris Jasper

Chaka Khan chronology
Destiny (1986)	ck (1988)	Life Is a Dance: The Remix Project (1989)

Singles from ck
- 1. "It's My Party" Released: October 1988; 2. "Baby Me" Released: February 1989; 3. "Soul Talkin'" Released: 1989

Professional ratings
Review scores
Source	Rating
AllMusic	4/5 stars

ck is the seventh studio album by American R&B/funk singer Chaka Khan, released on the Warner Bros. Records label in 1988.

== Background ==
ck was Khan's first album not to be recorded with Arif Mardin. Instead, it had, with the exception of two tracks, Russ Titelman at the helm as producer, with whom she had collaborated on hits including "Ain't Nobody" (1983), "Eye to Eye" from 1984's platinum-selling I Feel for You as well as "Tight Fit" from her previous album Destiny. Musically ck combined a variety of genres such as soul, R&B, funk, pop as well as two jazz titles and altogether the set was more laid-back, less hip-hop influenced and production-wise not as complex and synth-driven as I Feel for You and Destiny.

== Composition ==
ck opens with Khan's cover of Stevie Wonder's 1970 hit "Signed, Sealed, Delivered I'm Yours", again featuring the composer himself on harmonica, as on the 1984 hit single "I Feel for You".

One of the two tracks not to be produced by Russ Titelman was the funky and improvisational "Sticky Wicked", Khan's first proper collaboration with Prince after having covered his "I Feel for You" and turning it into a million-selling hit single. ck also includes a second Prince composition, a cover version of Sheena Easton's "Eternity" (produced by David Frank and Khan herself), and some ten years later Khan and Prince were to team up for a full-length album together, Come 2 My House.

ck includes one track written and co-produced by Chris Jasper, former member of the Isley Brothers, who was also responsible for writing and producing much of the Isley material from 1973 through 1984 before the Isley Brothers' breakup. Jasper can also be heard singing backing vocals with Khan on "Make It Last".

ck also features two recordings of jazz classics that since have become mainstays in Khan's live repertoire, "The End of a Love Affair", a tribute to Billie Holiday who first recorded the song on her 1958 album Lady in Satin, and Alec Wilder's "I'll Be Around", the latter with a guest appearance by trumpeter Miles Davis, who also features on the Prince track "Sticky Wicked".

== Singles ==
Three singles were released from ck: Womack & Womack's Latino-flavoured "It's My Party", which reached number five on Billboard's R&B Singles chart, "Soul Talkin'" and "Baby Me", which reached Top 20 on the R&B chart, peaking at number 12. The ck album itself also charted higher than the preceding Destiny, reaching number 17 on the R&B Albums chart.

One title from the ck sessions was only released as a single B-side, "Everybody Needs Some Love" written by former Rufus member David "Hawk" Wolinski, producer Russ Titelman and Khan herself.

== Track listing ==
1. "Signed, Sealed, Delivered (I'm Yours)" (Stevie Wonder, Syreeta Wright, Lula Mae Hardaway, Lee Garrett) - 4:45
2. "Soul Talkin'" (Brenda Russell) - 4:15
3. "It's My Party" (Womack & Womack) - 5:11
4. "Eternity" (Prince) - 4:03
5. "Sticky Wicked" (Prince) - 6:54
6. "The End of a Love Affair" (Edward Redding) - 5:11
7. "Baby Me" (Holly Knight, Billy Steinberg) - 4:04
8. "Make It Last" (Chris Jasper, Margie Jasper) - 4:48
9. "Where Are You Tonite" (Gary Haase, Chaka Khan) - 4:53
10. "I'll Be Around" (Alec Wilder) - 5:21

== Personnel ==
- Chaka Khan – vocals
- Jimmy Bralower – drums tracks: 1, 3, 7
- Rob Mounsey – keyboards tracks: 3, 6–7, 9–10
- Ron Skies – keyboards, drums tracks: 3–4, 6–7
- Carol Steele – percussion tracks: 1, 3, 8–9
- Omar Hakim – drums tracks: 1–2
- Paul Pesco – guitar tracks: 1, 7
- Stevie Wonder – harmonica track: 1
- Eddie Martinez – guitar tracks: 2, 3
- Hilary Bercovici – keyboards track: 2
- Steve Lindsey – keyboards track: 2
- Bobby McFerrin – vocals track: 2
- Brenda Russell – vocals track: 2
- Cecil Womack – vocals & keyboards track: 4
- Eric Leeds – saxophone track: 5
- Atlanta Bliss – trumpet track: 5
- Prince – all instruments except trumpets and saxophone track: 5
- Miles Davis – trumpet tracks: 5, 10
- Marcus Miller – bass guitar tracks: 6, 10
- Steve Ferrone – drums tracks: 6, 10
- George Benson – guitar track: 6
- John Tropea – guitar tracks: 6, 10
- Margaret Ross – harp tracks: 6, 10
- David Nadien – orchestra tracks: 6, 10
- Dave Grusin – piano tracks: 6, 10
- Warren Hill – saxophone tracks: 7, 8
- Bernard Wright – keyboards track: 9
- Chris Parker – percussion track: 9
- Chris Jasper – keyboards, synthesizers, background vocals: 8

== Production ==
- Russ Titelman – record producer tracks 1–3, 6–10
- Chaka Khan – producer track: 4
- David Frank – producer track: 4
- Chris Jasper – producer track: 8
- Prince – producer track: 5
- Gary Wright – sound mix tracks: 1–5, 7–9
- Josh Abbey – sound mix track: 6 & 10
- Ted Jensen at Sterling Sound, NYC – mastering

== Non-album tracks and remixes ==
- "Everybody Needs Some Love" (B-side of single "Baby Me", produced by Russ Titelman) – 4:26
- "It's My Party" (New Party Mix) – 8:40
- "It's My Party" (Club Instrumental) – 5:05
- "It's My Party" (Club Edit) – 5:10
- "It's My Party" (Dance Dub) – 5:18
- "Soul Talkin'" (Serious Soul Mix, remixed by Paul Simpson) – 6:14
- "Soul Talkin'" (Serious Soul Edit) – 4:25
- "Baby Me" (2 CK's And A Baby Mix) – 6:35
- "Baby Me" (Big Baby Mix-Extended Mix) – 4:21
- "Baby Me" (Nursery Mix) – 4:25

== Charts ==
Weekly chart performance for Ck
Chart (1988)	Peak position
Australian Albums (ARIA)	115
US Billboard 200	125
US Top R&B/Hip-Hop Albums (Billboard)	17
