= Love You All My Lifetime =

Single by Chaka Khan

from the album The Woman I Am
- Released: 1992
- Genre: R&B; funk
- Length: 4:46 (album version); 4:16 (radio edit)
- Label: Warner Bros.
- Songwriter: Klarmann/Weber
- Producer: David Gamson

Chaka Khan singles chronology
"Ain't Nobody" (1989)	"Love You All My Lifetime" (1992)	"Never Miss the Water" (1996)

Music video
- "Love You All My Lifetime" on YouTube

"Love You All My Lifetime" is a song performed by American singer-songwriter Chaka Khan. Written by the songwriting duo of Klarmann/Weber, it was released in 1992 by Warner Bros. Records as the first track from Khan's eighth album, The Woman I Am (1992). It was produced by David Gamson and was Khan's fifth number-one on the US Billboard dance chart. On other US charts, the single went to number two on the Billboard soul singles chart and number 68 on the Billboard Hot 100. Overseas, "Love You All My Lifetime", went to number 49 in the UK.

== Critical reception ==
Alex Henderson from AllMusic described the song as "appealing". Larry Flick from Billboard magazine wrote, "After numerous disappointments, Khan re-emerges with her most satisfying recording in years. She wraps that one-of-a-kind voice around a slinky and subtle R&B/funk jam that will inject a much-needed breath of fresh air into blah top 40 and urban formats. Fierce remixes by Dave Shaw and Boilerhouse are already kicking up a storm at club level." David Browne from Entertainment Weekly stated that the singer "gives it her all", wrapping her voice around "the delicious hook" of "Love You All My Lifetime".

== Charts ==
=== Weekly charts ===
Chart (1992)	Peak position
Australia (ARIA)	193
Europe (European Dance Radio)	2
UK Singles (Official Charts)	49
UK Airplay (Music Week)	42
UK Dance (Music Week)	7
UK Club Chart (Music Week)	8
US Billboard Hot 100	68
US Dance Club Songs (Billboard)	1
US Hot R&B/Hip-Hop Songs (Billboard)	2
US Cash Box Top 100	49

=== Year-end charts ===
Chart (1992)	Position
US Hot R&B/Hip-Hop Songs (Billboard)	44

== See also ==
- List of number-one dance singles of 1992 (U.S.)
