= This Is My Night =

Single by Chaka Khan

from the album I Feel for You
- B-side: "Caught in the Act"
- Released: January 1985
- Recorded: 1984
- Genre: R&B
- Length: 3:56 (7" version); 6:11 (12" version); 4:38 (album version); 5:07 (1989 remix album version)
- Label: Warner Bros.
- Songwriters: Mic Murphy; David Frank
- Producer: Arif Mardin

Chaka Khan singles chronology
| "I Feel for You" (1984) | "This Is My Night" (1985) | "Through the Fire" (1985) |

Music video
- "This Is My Night" on YouTube

"This Is My Night" is a song by Chaka Khan from the album I Feel for You. The song went to number one for one week on the Billboard dance chart in 1985. The single also peaked at number 60 on the Billboard Hot 100 and number 11 on the R&B chart.

"This Is My Night" was written by Mic Murphy and David Frank and produced by Arif Mardin.

A variation of the song was used by HBO as its theme music for Next On bumpers and promos from May to November 1985 (as the centerpiece of the Make the Magic Shine campaign). It also appeared on the twelfth season of the drag competition series RuPaul's Drag Race, in a "lip sync battle" between contestants Widow Von'Du and Jan, while Khan served as a guest judge.

== Track listing ==
=== 7" single ===
| No. | Title | Writer(s) | Length |
|---|---|---|---|
| 1. | "This Is My Night" | David Frank, Mic Murphy | 3:56 |
| 2. | "Caught in the Act" | Alec Milstein, Joe Mardin | 3:47 |
| Total length: | | | 7:43 |

=== 12" single ===
| No. | Title | Length |
|---|---|---|
| 1. | "This Is My Night" (extended version) | 6:11 |
| 2. | "Caught in the Act" | 3:47 |
| Total length: | | 9:58 |

== Chart positions ==
| Chart (1985) | Peak position |
|---|---|
| Belgium (Ultratop 50 Flanders) | 12 |
| Canada (Canadian Singles Chart) | 85 |
| Germany (GfK) | 47 |
| Ireland (IRMA) | 7 |
| Netherlands (Single Top 100) | 20 |
| New Zealand (Recorded Music NZ) | 34 |
| UK Singles (Official Charts) | 14 |
| US Billboard Hot 100 | 60 |
| US Dance Club Songs (Billboard) | 1 |
| US Hot R&B/Hip-Hop Songs (Billboard) | 11 |
