= Joe Mardin =

American record producer

Joe Mardin (born Yusuf Mardin) is a Turkish-American music producer, arranger and engineer from New York City. He is a Berklee College of Music graduate and is the son of the Turkish American producer Arif Mardin. Joe Mardin is also a conductor, songwriter and drummer.

Along with his father, Joe Mardin co-produced Queen Latifah, The Dana Owens Album, Joy A Holiday Collection, a Christmas album by singer/songwriter Jewel (he shared several roles on both albums including conductor, arranger, engineer, programming and orchestration), and the debut album of blind singer, songwriter, guitarist Raul Midón entitled State of Mind. He also produced Raul Midon's second album for Manhattan Records, which came out in September 2007.

Mardin was a co-composer for "Caught in the Act" on Chaka Khan's I Feel For You album. His conducting credits include Whitney Houston's Whitney: The Greatest Hits album.

He produced the documentary The Greatest Ears in Town: The Arif Mardin Story which is about the career of his father. It was directed by Doug Biro.

He works with Paul Waaktaar-Savoy playing drums in the songs "Ancient Arches" and "Sequoia has Fallen" on Waaktaar & Zoe's album, World of Trouble. Joe Mardin later performed the drums on the song "Goodbye Thompson" on the Cast in Steel album by A-ha. Mardin appeared again on the 2022 A-ha album True North (A-ha album) where he did orchestral arrangements on several of the tracks.
