= Eye to Eye (Chaka Khan song) =

Single by Chaka Khan

from the album I Feel For You
- B-side: "La Flamme"
- Released: April 1985
- Genre: R&B, soul
- Length: 4:38
- Label: Warner Bros.
- Songwriters: Dan Sembello. Don Freeman, John Sembello & Michael Sembello
- Producers: Arif Mardin, Dan Sembello, Michael Sembello

Chaka Khan singles chronology
"Through The Fire" (1985)	"Eye to Eye" (1985)	"(Krush Groove) Can't Stop The Street" (1985)

"Eye To Eye" is a 1985 song by American R&B singer Chaka Khan from her album I Feel For You. The song was a major hit in the United Kingdom where it peaked at number 16. Later, it was used as the theme song to Philippine TV talk show Eye to Eye (1988–1996).

== Remixes ==
The song was remixed for Chaka Khan's album Life Is A Dance - The Remix Project, this remixed version was included on Khan's compilation album The Platinum Collection. The remix was done by British musician Paul Simpson.

== Track listing ==
=== 7" single ===
No.	Title	Writer(s)	Length
1.	"Eye To Eye"	Dan Sembello, Don Freeman, John Sembello & Michael Sembello	4:20
2.	"La Flamme"	Chaka Khan, Rhoda Roberts	4:27

=== 12" single ===
No.	Title	Length
1.	"Eye To Eye (Extended Version)"	6:35
2.	"La Flamme"	4:27

== Charts ==
Chart (1985)	Peak position
Ireland (IRMA)	12
Netherlands (Single Top 100)	43
United Kingdom (UK Singles Chart)	16
