= Destiny (Chaka Khan album) =

1986 studio album by Chaka Khan

Studio album by Chaka Khan
- Released: July 1986
- Recorded: 1985–1986
- Genre: R&B
- Length: 47:05
- Label: Warner Bros.
- Producers: Arif Mardin; David Gamson; Joe Mardin; Robbie Buchanan; Chaka Khan; Philippe Saisse; Beau Hill; Reggie Griffin; Russ Titelman; Cengiz Yaltkaya

Chaka Khan chronology
I Feel for You (1984)	Destiny (1986)	CK (1988)

Singles from Destiny
- 1. "Love of a Lifetime" Released: January 1986; 2. "Tight Fit" Released: March 1986; 3. "The Other Side of the World" Released: May 1986; 4. "Earth to Mickey" Released: August 1986

Professional ratings
Review scores
Source	Rating
AllMusic	3/5 stars
Robert Christgau	B

Destiny is the sixth studio album by American R&B/funk singer Chaka Khan, released on Warner Bros. Records in 1986.

== Background ==
Destiny was Khan's follow-up to the platinum-selling I Feel for You and was as high tech as its predecessor—symptomatically and characteristically for its period with more producers and sound engineers credited in the liner notes than musicians—but was musically more geared towards rock and pop than soul and R&B, most prominently on tracks such as "So Close", the self-penned title track "My Destiny", "Who's It Gonna Be" and "Watching the World" featuring Phil Collins on drums and backing vocals.

The album spun off five single releases, the first being "Love of a Lifetime", co-written, co-produced and featuring backing vocals by Green Gartside of British band Scritti Politti (US Pop number 53, US R&B number 21, UK number 52). The second single "Tight Fit" was a midtempo R&B ballad, just like "Eye to Eye" from I Feel for You produced by Russ Titelman, which reached number 28 on the US R&B chart. The satirical "Earth to Mickey" (When are you going to land?), featuring Khan both singing and rapping (and keyboardist Reggie Griffin rapping in the role of 'Mickey'), was released as the third single in early 1987 and only just made the Top 100 of the R&B chart, peaking at number 93. The dramatic ballad "The Other Side of the World", written by Mike Rutherford of Genesis and B. A. Robertson and which had first been released as part of the White Nights soundtrack album in late 1985, reached number 81. The fifth single "Watching the World" never charted. The album itself fared slightly better, reaching number 25 on Billboard's R&B albums chart, but stalling at number 67 on Pop and number 77 in the UK. Destiny however gave Khan another Grammy nomination in 1987 for Best R&B Vocal Performance, Female. The track "My Destiny" was used as the theme song for Richard Pryor's motion picture Jo Jo Dancer, Your Life Is Calling.

The closing track, the heavily edited one minute thirty-nine seconds "Coltrane Dreams", a tribute to John Coltrane, had a backing track mainly made up of samples of Khan's voice. The actual full-length version of the track (4:54) was only released as the B-side of the 12" single "Love of a Lifetime".

"Love of a Lifetime", "Tight Fit", "Earth to Mickey" and "Watching the World" were all released as 12" singles including extended remixes.

While the success of Khan's own single releases in 1986 was limited to the R&B charts, she appeared as featured vocalist/vocal arranger on two worldwide pop/rock chart hits that same year, Steve Winwood's "Higher Love" and Robert Palmer's "Addicted to Love"; on the latter she was only credited for 'vocal arrangement' in the liner notes. The song was originally recorded with Khan sharing lead vocals with Palmer but due to contractual problems between Warner Bros. Records and Island Records her own vocals were removed from the final mix.

== Track listing ==
1. "Love of a Lifetime" (David Gamson, Green Gartside) – 4:21
2. "Earth to Mickey" (Charlie Singleton) – 5:37
3. "Watching the World" (John Lang, Richard Page, Steve George) – 4:44
4. "The Other Side of the World" (B. A. Robertson, Mike Rutherford) – 3:41
5. "My Destiny" (Chaka Khan) – 4:39
6. "I Can't Be Loved" (Glen Ballard, Randy Goodrum) – 4:30
7. "It's You" (Portia Griffin, Tony Patler) – 4:19
8. "So Close" (Richard Feldman, Marcy Levy, Pam Tillis) – 4:19
9. "Tight Fit" (Bunny Siegler, Marvin Morrow) – 4:39
10. "Who's It Gonna Be" (Gary Goetzman, Mike Picirillo) – 4:37
11. "Coltrane Dreams" (Chaka Khan, Julie Mardin, Arif Mardin) – 1:39

== Personnel ==
Track 1 “Love of a Lifetime”
Drums – Fred Maher
Bass, Guitar [Additional] – Marcus Miller
Guitar – Nick Moroch
Keyboards [Additional] – David Lebolt
Synthesizer Programmed By – David Gamson
Additional Synthesizer Programming – Jason Miles, Michael Colina
Backing Vocals – Chaka Khan, Mark Stevens, Green Gartside
Saxophone [Alto & Solo] – Bob Gay
Saxophone [Tenor] – Scott Gilman
Trumpet – Matthew Cornish

Track 2 “Earth to Mickey”
Synthesizer, Keyboards, Guitar, Rap [Mickey's Rap Performed By] – Reggie Griffin
Special Effects Editing – Arif Mardin
Backing Vocals – Chaka Khan, Mark Stevens, Sandra St. Victor

Track 3 “Watching the World”
Drums – Phil Collins
Additional Drum Sounds – David Rosenberg
Bass – Pino Palladino
Guitar – Dan Huff
Synthesizer [Additional], Sequenced By – Joe Mardin
Synthesizer, Programmed By – David Lebolt
Backing Vocals – Chaka Khan, Mark Stevens, Phil Collins
Saxophone [Tenor] – Michael Brecker
Trombone – Tom Malone
Trumpet – Jon Faddis, Marvin Stamm, Michael Mossman, Randy Brecker

Track 4 – “The Other Side of the World”
Producer, Synthesizer – Robbie Buchanan

Track 5 – “My Destiny”
Drums – Steve Ferrone
Bass – Anthony Jackson
Guitar – Randy Fredrix
Keyboards, Programmed By – Philippe Saisse

Track 6 “I Can't Be Loved”
Keyboards, Programmed By [Synthesizer Programming], Guitar, Backing Vocals – Reggie Griffin
Keyboards, Programmed By [Synthesizer Programming], Percussion [Additional] – Joe Mardin
Drum Sounds – David Rosenberg
Guitar – Paul Pesco
Sequenced By [Additional Sequencing] – Glen Ballard, Randy Goodrum
Backing Vocals – Cindy Mizelle, Sandra St. Victor
String Arrangement – Arif Mardin
Concertmaster [Strings] – Gene Orloff

Track 7 “It's You”
Keyboards, Saxophone, Guitar, Programmed By – Reggie Griffin
Additional Keyboards – Tony Patler
Backing Vocals – Chaka Khan, Mark Stevens, Sandra St. Victor

Track 8 “So Close”
Drums – David Rosenberg
Synthesizer [Synthesizer Bass], Keyboards – Beau Hill
Guitar – Reb Beach
Backing Vocals – Chaka Khan, Sandra St. Victor

Track 9 “Tight Fit”
Drum Programming – Jimmy Bralower
Synthesizer [Synthesizer Bass] – Tony Patler
Guitar – Paul Pesco
Keyboards, Programmed By [Synthesizer Programming] – Joe Mardin
Backing Vocals – Chaka Khan, Mark Stevens, Sandra St. Victor
Saxophone [Alto] – Robert Gay

Track 10 “Who's It Gonna Be”
Drum Programming – Bob Riley
Guitar – Nick Moroch
Producer, Arranged By, Synthesizer, Programmed By – Joe Mardin
Synthesizer [Solo] – Reggie Griffin
Synthesizer, Programmed By – David Lebolt
Backing Vocals – Chaka Khan, Mark Stevens, Sandra St. Victor
Timbales, Cowbell – Chaka Khan

Track 11 “Coltrane Dreams”
Drums – Steve Ferrone
Drum Programming – Thomas Oldakowski
Keyboards – Cengiz Yaltkaya
Synclavier Programming – John Mahoney
Saxophone [Tenor Sax Solo] – Sam Rivers

== Production ==
Producers

- Arif Mardin (tracks 1–11)
- David Gamson (track 1)
- Green Gartside (track 1)
- Joe Mardin (tracks 3, 6 & 10)
- Robbie Buchanan (track 4)
- Chaka Khan (track 5)
- Philippe Saisse (track 5)
- Reggie Griffin (tracks 6 & 7)
- Beau Hill (track 8)
- Russ Titelman (track 9)
- Cengiz Yaltkaya (track 11)

Recording and Mixing

- Ray Bardani – recording (track 1)
- Bruce Robbins – assistant engineer (track 1)
- Ed Garcia – assistant engineer (tracks 1, 2, 5, 7, 9 & 10), mix assistant (track 3), additional recording (track 6).
- Bruce Robbins – assistant engineer (track 1)
- Iris Cohen – assistant engineer (track 1)
- Steve Boyer – assistant engineer (track 1)
- Steven Carthy – assistant engineer (tracks 1, 4-7 & 9)
- Wayne Warnecke – assistant engineer (track 1)
- John "Tokes" Potoker – mix and drum recording (track 1), mixing (track 7).
- Ellen Fitton – assistant engineer (tracks 2 & 9)
- Michael O'Reilly – recording and mixing (tracks 2, 3 & 10), re-recording and remix (track 4), additional recording (tracks 6 & 11), recording (track 9).
- Mike Ging – assistant engineer (track 3)
- Paul Gomersall – assistant engineer (track 3)
- Simon Sullivan – additional recording (track 3)
- Hugh Padgham – recording of Phil Collins segment (track 3)
- Mike Ross – assistant engineer (track 4)
- Philip Castellano – assistant engineer (track 4)
- Steve MacMillan – assistant engineer (track 4)
- Rod Hui – re-recording (track 4), recording and mixing (track 6), additional recording (track 7).
- Jack Joseph Puig – recording and mixing (track 4)
- Acar Key – assistant engineer (tracks 5, 7 & 10)
- Craig Vogel – assistant engineer (tracks 5 & 9)
- Dave O'Donnell – assistant engineer (track 5)
- Eric Calvi – mixing (track 5)
- David Harrington – assistant engineer (track 6)
- Ellen Fitton – assistant engineer (tracks 6, 9 & 11)
- Ira MacLaughlin – assistant engineer (tracks 6 & 8)
- Stephen Benben – assistant engineer (track 6), re-recording (track 8)
- Rod O'Brian – recording (track 6), additional recording (track 7), assistant engineer (track 9).
- Reggie Griffin – mixing (track 6)
- Joe Mardin – mixing (track 6)
- Bob Rosa – recording (track 7), assistant engineer (track 10).
- Bobby Warner – additional recording (track 8)
- Barbara Milne – assistant engineer (track 9)
- Ernie Wilkins – assistant engineer (track 9)
- Jeff Lord-Alge – assistant engineer (track 9)
- Chris Lord-Alge – recording (track 9)
- Steve Peck – additional recording (track 9), assistant engineer (track 10).
- Tom Lord-Alge – recording and mixing (track 9)
- Jimmy Douglass – assistant engineer (track 10), recording and mixing (track 11).
- Hugo Dwyer – additional recording (track 11)
- Michael Morongell – additional recording (track 11)
- Mark Pawlowski – assisting engineer (track 11)

Additional Credits

- Arif Mardin – executive producer
- Christy Allerdings – production coordinator (tracks 1–8, 10 & 11)
- Leyla Turkkan – assistant production coordination (tracks 1–8, 10 & 11)
- Jill Dell'Abate – production coordinator (track 9)
- Phillip Namanworth – project supervisor (tracks 1, 2, 3 & 5–11)
- Jeri McManus – art direction
- Lynn Robb – design and lettering
- George Holz – photography
- Burt Zell Management – direction

== Non-album tracks and remixes ==
- "Love of a Lifetime" (extended dance version) – 6:09
- "Coltrane Dreams" (long version) – 4:54
- "Tight Fit" (extended version, remixed by Tom Lord-Alge) – 6:18
- "Earth to Mickey" (extended version) – 6:48
- "Earth to Mickey" (instrumental version) – 3:17
- "Earth to Mickey" (a cappella voices) – 0:51
- "Earth to Mickey" (CK's Duet Space Rap) – 5:22
- "Watching the World" (extended remix) – 6:11

== Charts ==
Chart (1986)	Peak position
Dutch Albums (Album Top 100)	49
German Albums (Offizielle Top 100)	50
Swedish Albums (Sverigetopplistan)	13
Swiss Albums (Schweizer Hitparade)	26
UK Albums (Official Charts)	77
US Billboard 200	67
US Top R&B/Hip-Hop Albums (Billboard)	25
