= Chaka (album) =

1978 debut solo album by Chaka Khan

Studio album by Chaka Khan
- Released: October 12, 1978
- Studio: Atlantic Recording Studios (New York City)
- Length: 43:11
- Label: Warner Bros.
- Producer: Arif Mardin

Chaka Khan chronology
Street Player (1978)	Chaka (1978)	Masterjam (1979)

Singles from Chaka
- 1. "I'm Every Woman" Released: September 26, 1978; 2. "Life is a Dance" Released: January 17, 1979

Chaka is the debut solo album by American singer Chaka Khan. It was released on October 12, 1978, through Warner Bros. Records. Following the release of the Chaka album, Khan reunited with Rufus for the recording of 1979's Masterjam, produced by Quincy Jones. Her second solo album Naughty followed in 1980.

== Overview ==
Two singles were released from Chaka, the first being her anthemic solo debut "I'm Every Woman," which would become one of Khan's signature tunes alongside "Ain't Nobody" (1983) and "I Feel For You" (1984). The song has over the past three decades been re-released, remixed and covered a number of times, most notably by Whitney Houston in 1992 for the soundtrack album The Bodyguard, then featuring guest vocals by Khan herself and topping Billboard's Hot Dance Music/Club Play chart. A remix of Khan's original recording was also a Top-Ten hit in the U.K. in 1989. The remix was included on the compilation Life is a Dance - The Remix Project, the title track of which was the second single release from the Chaka album in early 1979 (US R&B number 40). The album also features the ballad "Roll Me Through The Rushes", never commercially released as a single but still receiving considerable airplay in 1979, as well as Khan's cover version of Stevie Wonder's "I Was Made To Love Her", re-titled "I Was Made to Love Him".

== Critical reception ==
Professional ratings
Review scores
Source	Rating
Allmusic	4/5 stars
Christgau's Record Guide	B

AllMusic editor Andy Kellman called the album "a near-total break from Rufus." He found that although "I'm Every Woman" "overshadows everything else on Chaka, the album is full of outstanding performances and a broad range of strong material pulled together by Arif Mardin. It's a near-total break from Rufus. The only connections are Tony Maiden's guitar solo on a gender-switched cover of Stevie Wonder's "I Was Made to Love Her" and writing input from a few Rufus collaborators." Robert Christgau wrote that "Mardin and the usual En Why studio funkies lay down a heavier bottom for Ms. Rufus than her El Lay street bottom for Ms. Rufus than her El Lay street players have in years. She's expressing herself by looking for songs, too, but while every one gives her something to say, only Ashford & Simpson's "I'm Every Woman" is up to her human potential."

== Commercial performance ==
Chaka debuted at number 111 on the US Billboard 200 in the week of November 4, 1978, and eventually peaked at number 12 on December 16, 1978. It was certified Gold by the Recording Industry Association of America (RIAA) on November 14, 1978.

== Track listing ==
Chaka track listing
No.	Title	Writer(s)	Length
1.	"I'm Every Woman"	Nickolas Ashford; Valerie Simpson	4:07
2.	"Love Has Fallen on Me"	Lloyd Cleveland Webber; Charles Stepney	4:52
3.	"Roll Me Through the Rushes"	David Lasley; Lana Marrano	4:42
4.	"Sleep on It"	Andrew Kastner; Larry John McNally	4:21
5.	"Life Is a Dance"	Gavin Christopher	4:20
6.	"We Got the Love" (duet with George Benson)	Benson	3:27
7.	"Some Love"	Khan; Keith Boyd, Jr.; Traude Sapik; Mark Stevens	5:50
8.	"A Woman in a Man's World"	Kastner; McNally	3:56
9.	"The Message in the Middle of the Bottom"	Lalomie Washburn	4:15
10.	"I Was Made to Love Him"	Henry Cosby, Lula Mae Hardaway, Sylvia Moy, Stevie Wonder	3:23

== Personnel ==
Performers and musicians

- Jonathan Abramowitz – strings
- Susan Allen – strings
- Julien Barber – strings
- George Benson – lead vocalist
- Bianco – harp, strings
- Ken Bichel – synthesizer (S.R.M.) (tracks 4, 6, 8)
- Richard Bock – cello, strings
- Phil Bodner – flutes
- Michael Brecker – tenor saxophone (tracks 2, 5, 6)
- Randy Brecker – flugelhorn, trumpet (tracks 2, 5, 6, 7, 8, 9)
- Frederick Buldrini – strings
- Jim Buffington – French horn (tracks 3, 4)
- John Clark – French horn (tracks 7, 8, 9)
- Raphael Cruz – congas
- Ronnie Cuber – baritone saxophone (tracks 2, 5, 6)
- Eddie Daniels – flutes
- Cornell Dupree – guitar
- Paul Faulise – bass trombone
- Steve Ferrone – drums
- Sammy Figueroa – percussion
- Terri Gonzalez – backing vocalist
- Alan Gorrie – backing vocalist
- Cissy Houston – backing vocalist
- Regis Iandiorio – strings
- Theodore Israel – strings
- Anthony Jackson – bass (tracks 2, 4, 10)
- Arthur Jenkins – electric piano
- Andrew Kastner – guitar
- Chaka Khan – lead vocals, backing vocals
- Harold Kohon – strings
- David Lasley – backing vocalist
- Will Lee – backing vocalist, bass guitar (tracks 1, 3, 5)
- Jesse Levy – cello, strings
- Guy Lumia – strings
- Tony Maiden – guitar
- Joe Malin – strings
- George Marge – alte flute, strings
- Rick Marotta – drums
- Onnie McIntyre – guitar
- Marvin Morgenstern – strings
- Kermit Moore – cello, strings
- Airto Moreira – percussion
- Gene Orloff – concertmaster
- Leon Pendarvis – electric piano
- Barry Rogers – trombone (tracks 2, 5, 6)
- David Sanborn – alto saxophone
- Richard Sortomme – strings
- Mark Stevens – backing vocalist, bass
- Hamish Stuart – backing vocalist
- Hamish Stuart – backing vocalist, guitar (tracks 1, 2, 4, 5, 6, 8, 10)
- Mitsue Takayama – strings
- Richard Tee – clavinet, piano (tracks 1, 2, 4, 5, 7, 8, 10)
- Brooks Tillotson – French horn (tracks 3, 4, 7, 8, 9)
- Phil Upchurch – guitar (tracks 1, 2, 3, 4, 5, 7, 8, 9, 10)
- Luther Vandross – backing vocalist
- Pat Winter – strings
- George Young – alto saxophone (tracks 2, 5, 6)

Technical

- Arif Mardin – producer, arranger, brass, strings, woodwind
- Chaka Khan – musical arranger (track 5)
- James Douglass – sound engineer
- Bill Dooley – assistant sound engineer
- Michael O'Reilly – assistant sound engineer
- Randy Mason – assistant sound engineer
- Sheridan Eldridge – assistant sound engineer
- Anthony D'Amico – assistant sound engineer
- Lew Hahn – additional recording engineer, remix
- Gene Paul – additional recording engineer

== Charts ==
Weekly chart performance for Chaka
Chart (1978–2024)	Peak position
Australian Albums (ARIA)	74
Dutch Albums (Album Top 100)	50
Hungarian Physical Albums (MAHASZ)	5
US Billboard 200	12
US Top R&B/Hip-Hop Albums (Billboard)	2

== Certifications ==
Certifications for Chaka
Region	Certification	Certified units/sales
United States (RIAA)	Gold	500,000^{^}
^{^} Shipments figures based on certification alone.
