= Through the Fire (song) =

Single by Chaka Khan

from the album I Feel for You
- B-side: "I'm Every Woman"; "La Flamme"
- Released: April 1985 (U.S.)
- Recorded: 1984
- Genre: R&B; quiet storm
- Length: 4:47
- Label: Warner Bros.
- Songwriters: David Foster; Tom Keane; Cynthia Weil
- Producer: David Foster

Chaka Khan singles chronology
"This Is My Night" (1985)	"Through the Fire" (1985)	"Eye to Eye" (1985)

Music video
- "Through the Fire" on YouTube

"Through the Fire" is a song recorded by Chaka Khan from her sixth studio album, I Feel for You (1984). The David Foster-produced track was the third single from the album and reached number 60 on the US Billboard Hot 100 chart and number 15 on the R&B singles chart. It was one of the few Khan hits to cross to the Adult Contemporary chart.

Foster revealed in his 2011 PBS concert The Hit Man Returns that this was the only melody that he ever wrote with someone in mind, and that the working title of the piece was actually called "Chaka" because he was very confident that Khan would perform the song.

== Music video ==
The video was filmed in Los Angeles' Union Station. It features Khan singing while strolling among several romantically involved couples. It was directed by Marty Callner.

== Personnel ==
=== Musicians ===
- Chaka Khan – lead and backing vocals
- Nathan East – bass guitar
- John Robinson – drums, percussion
- Michael Landau – guitar
- David Foster – keyboards, synthesizers

=== Production ===
- David Foster – producer, musical arranger
- Humberto Gatica – producer, audio mixing

== Chart history ==
Chart (1985)	Peak position
UK Singles (OCC)	77
US Billboard Hot 100	60
US Adult Contemporary (Billboard)	16
US Hot R&B/Hip-Hop Songs (Billboard)	15

== Cover versions and usage in media ==
The song was covered by Peabo Bryson for his 1994 album of the same name.

Filipino singer and actress Cherie Gil did a cover of this song from the 1986 film and album, Sana'y Wala Nang Wakas.

It was sampled by Kanye West on "Through the Wire", the breakout single from his 2004 debut album, The College Dropout.

Ole Børud and Joe Pizzulo covered the song on the 2009 David Foster tribute album Fly Away - Songs of David Foster.

In 2010, Japanese-American singer Ai covered "Through the Fire" on her studio album The Last Ai with Khan. Alongside another song Khan was featured on, "One More Try", the duo were nominated for and won the International Collaboration Artists of the Year award at the 2010 Billboard Japan Music Awards for both songs.

Gospel artist Donald Lawrence included a cover of the song, performed by Tobbi White-Darks and Tommi White, on his album YRM (Your Righteous Mind) (2011).

"Through the Fire" was used as the theme song for the 2021 film My Amanda.
