= I Feel for You (album) =

1984 studio album by Chaka Khan

Studio album by Chaka Khan
- Released: October 1, 1984
- Length: 46:51
- Label: Warner Bros.
- Producers: Robbie Buchanan; David Foster; James Newton Howard; Arif Mardin; Joe Mardin; John Robie; Russ Titelman; David "Hawk" Wolinski

Chaka Khan chronology
Stompin' at the Savoy – Live (with Rufus) (1983)	I Feel for You (1984)	Destiny (1986)

Singles from I Feel for You
- 1. "I Feel for You" Released: August 1984; 2. "This Is My Night" Released: January 1985; 3. "Through the Fire" Released: April 1985; 4. "Eye to Eye" Released: April 1985

I Feel for You is the fifth solo studio album by American R&B/funk singer Chaka Khan, released on the Warner Bros. Records label in 1984.

== Background ==
After having balanced her two simultaneous careers as a member of the band Rufus and a solo performer during the years 1978 to 1983, which culminated with the release of the final Rufus & Chaka Khan album Stompin' at the Savoy – Live, after which the band dissolved, Khan recorded the album that was to make her a pop star with mainstream chart success: 1984's I Feel for You.

== Overview ==
The title track, "I Feel for You", was a cover of a 1979 Prince track, featuring Grandmaster Melle Mel on the classic "Ch-ch-ch-chaka-chaka-chaka Khan" rap intro and Stevie Wonder on chromatic harmonica (and also a sample from one of his first hits, "Fingertips"). The song saw Khan embracing high-tech funk, rap and hip hop, and stands as one of her best known songs and her biggest commercial hit, reaching number 3 on the Billboard chart in the US (and becoming the number 5 best-selling song of the year in 1985) and topping the US R&B, Dance, and UK Singles Chart. The song earned her a second Grammy Award in 1985 for Best R&B Vocal Performance, Female.

Additional hit singles were "This Is My Night" (US No. 60, R&B No. 11, Dance No. 1, UK No. 14), "Eye to Eye" (UK No. 16) and the ballad "Through the Fire", which crossed over to the adult contemporary chart (No. 16) and charted at No. 77 in the UK. The album's second ballad, "Stronger Than Before", co-written by Burt Bacharach, Bruce Roberts and Carole Bayer Sager, was released as the fifth single in certain markets.

"I Feel for You", "This Is My Night" and "Eye to Eye" were released as extended 12" remixes in 1984, and other mixes were created for the 1989 remix compilation Life Is a Dance: The Remix Project. The 1984 mixes by Arif Mardin and Russ Titelman remain unreleased on CD.

1985 saw two other songs by Khan released on other albums: "(Krush Groove) Can't Stop the Street" from the Krush Groove soundtrack (US R&B No. 18, UK No. 80), and "Own the Night", from the Miami Vice soundtrack (US Pop No. 57, US R&B No. 66).

== Critical reception ==
Professional ratings
Review scores
Source	Rating
AllMusic	5/5 stars
The Rolling Stone Album Guide	3/5 stars
Slant Magazine	4.5/5 stars
The Village Voice	C+

In a review of I Feel for You, Billboard deemed it a "fine new work" from Khan, finding her at "the peak of her powers" while covering "sharp techno-pop" and "a gutsy kind of adult contemporary." Don Snowden from The Boston Phoenix wrote that the singer had become "entranced with her electro-boogie wonderland" and even embraced "the latest street beats". He credited producer Arif Mardin for unifying the album with "a glistening metallic edifice of sound, true metal-machine music for life and love in highrise apartments where silk sheets and polished chrome dominate the décor", although he felt the drawback of such densely melodic arrangements was the constraint they placed on Khan's singing, likening the effect to "the desperate air of someone trapped in a penthouse prison of her own device".

People said apart from the title track's inventive music, the record had a "nondescript nature"; apart from Khan's modicum of feeling on "Through the Fire", "one can listen to this album for a long time and still not feel she is making any impact." Slant Magazine's Eric Henderson considered I Feel for You a landmark pop and post-disco release, as well as Khan's "most grandly sustained moment of pop craft". Slant Magazine also included it on their 2003 list of 50 Essential Pop Albums. According to AllMusic's Alex Henderson, it found Khan successfully adapting to the stylistic changes R&B had undergone since her 1970s music with Rufus, as "horn-powered funk bands, strings-laden Philadelphia soul, and orchestral disco were out of vogue, and the urban contemporary audiences of 1984 were into a more high-tech, heavily electronic style of R&B." Henderson called the record "excellent from start to finish" and exemplary of "the urban contemporary scene of 1984". Robert Christgau was more critical in The Village Voice, accusing Khan of "coasting" on her "splendid" voice while singling out the title track and John Robie's contribution on "My Love Is Alive" for possessing the majority of I Feel for You's "musical interest (as opposed to attraction)".

== Commercial performance ==
I Feel for You debuted at number 163 on the US Billboard 200 in the week of October 20, 1984 and eventually peaked at number 14 in the week ending December 1, 1984. It became Khan's highest-charting album since Chaka (1978) as well as her biggest-selling album yet. On December 13, 1984, I Feel for You was certified Gold by the Recording Industry Association of America (RIAA). It reached Platinum status five days later.

== Track listing ==
I Feel for You track listing
No.	Title	Writer(s)	Producer(s)	Length
1.	"This Is My Night"	David Frank; Mic Murphy	Arif Mardin	4:38
2.	"Stronger Than Before"	Burt Bacharach; Bruce Roberts; Carole Bayer Sager	A. Mardin; Robbie Buchanan	4:21
3.	"My Love Is Alive"	Gary Wright	A. Mardin; John Robie	4:42
4.	"Eye to Eye"	Don Freeman; Danny Sembello; John Sembello; Michael Sembello	Russ Titelman	4:38
5.	"La Flamme"	Chaka Khan; Rhoda Roberts; Philippe Saisse	A. Mardin	4:27
6.	"I Feel for You"	Prince	A. Mardin	5:44
7.	"Hold Her"	James Newton Howard; David "Hawk" Wolinski	A. Mardin; Howard; Hawk	5:14
8.	"Through the Fire"	David Foster; Tom Keane; Cynthia Weil	Foster	4:47
9.	"Caught in the Act"	Joe Mardin; Alec Milstein	A. Mardin; J. Mardin	3:45
10.	"Chinatown"	Khan; Roberts; Saisse	A. Mardin	4:37
Total length:				46:51

== Personnel ==
Performers and musicians

- Chaka Khan – lead vocals, backing vocals
- David Frank – keyboards, synthesizer track: 1, keyboards, synthesizer, programming track: 6
- Mic Murphy – backing vocals track: 1
- Steve Ferrone – drums tracks: 1, 4
- Paul Pesco – guitar track: 1
- Philippe Saisse – additional keyboards track: 1, keyboards, synthesizer, programming track: 5, 6, 10
- Steve Lukather – guitar track: 7
- Nathan East – bass guitar track: 2, 8
- John Robinson – drums track: 2, 7, 8
- Dann Huff – guitar track: 2
- Robbie Buchanan – keyboards, synthesizer track: 2, keyboards, synthesizer, programming track: 6
- Craig Siegel – Fairlight programming track: 2
- John Robie – keyboards, synthesizer, programming track: 3
- Cruz Sembello – backing vocals track: 4
- Tony Maiden – rhythm guitar track: 4
- Michael Sembello – guitar solo, backing vocals track: 4
- Danny Sembello – keyboards, synthesizer track: 4
- Don Freeman – keyboards, synthesizer track: 4
- Rob Mounsey – Synclavier track: 4
- Hamish Stuart – backing vocals track: 5
- Mark Stevens – backing vocals track: 5
- Reggie Griffin – guitar, bass, keyboards, synthesizer, programming track: 6
- Stevie Wonder – chromatic harmonica track: 6
- Grandmaster Melle Mel – vocals track: 6
- Steve Porcaro – keyboards track: 7
- Hawk – bass, keyboards track: 7
- James Newton Howard – keyboards track: 7
- Michael Landau – guitar track: 8
- David Foster – keyboards, synthesizer track: 8
- Marcus Ryle – programming track: 8
- Alec Milstein – backing vocals track: 9
- Vadim Zilberstein – guitar track: 9
- Keith "Plex" Barnhart – keyboards, synthesizer track: 9
- Joe Mardin – drums track: 9

Technical

- Arif Mardin – record producer tracks: 1–3, 5–7, 9, 10
- Lew Hahn – audio mixing tracks: 1, 2, 5–7, 10
- Robbie Buchanan – producer track: 2
- John Robie – producer, audio mixing track: 3
- Russ Titelman – producer track: 4
- Elliot Scheiner – audio mixing track: 4
- David "Hawk" Wolinski – producer track 7
- James Newton Howard – producer track: 7
- David Foster – producer, musical arranger track: 8
- Humberto Gatica – producer, audio mixing track: 8
- Joe Mardin – producer, audio mixing track: 9
- Bill Dooley – audio mixing track: 9
- Michael O'Reilly – audio mixing track: 9

== Charts ==
=== Weekly charts ===
Weekly chart performance for I Feel for You
Chart (1984–85)	Peak position
Australia Albums (Kent Music Report)	71
Canada Top Albums/CDs (RPM)	27
Dutch Albums (Album Top 100)	25
European Albums (Music & Media)	14
German Albums (Offizielle Top 100)	17
New Zealand Albums (RMNZ)	22
Swedish Albums (Sverigetopplistan)	9
Swiss Albums (Schweizer Hitparade)	14
UK Albums (Official Charts)	15
US Billboard 200	14
US Top R&B/Hip-Hop Albums (Billboard)	4

=== Year-end charts ===
Year-end chart performance for I Feel for You
Chart (1985)	Position
US Billboard 200	57
US Top R&B/Hip-Hop Albums (Billboard)	25

== Certifications ==
Certifications for I Feel for You
Region	Certification	Certified units/sales
Japan (RIAJ)	Gold	100,000^{^}
United Kingdom (BPI)	Gold	100,000^{^}
United States (RIAA)	Platinum	1,000,000^{^}
^{^} Shipments figures based on certification alone.
