= I Feel for You =

1984 single by Chaka Khan, written and originally performed by Prince

Single by Prince

from the album Prince
- Released: October 18, 2019 (acoustic version)
- Recorded: April 19, 1979 (tracking), May 30, 1979 (mixing and overdubbing) (album version)
- Studio: Alpha Studios, Burbank, California (tracking), Hollywood Sound Recorders, Hollywood, California (overdubbing and mixing)
- Genre: Disco; funk; synth-pop; R&B
- Length: 3:24 (album version); 4:32 (acoustic version)
- Label: Warner Bros.
- Songwriter: Prince
- Producer: Prince

"I Feel for You" is a song written by American musician Prince that originally appeared on his 1979 self-titled album. The most successful and best-known version was recorded by R&B singer Chaka Khan and appeared on her 1984 album of the same name. It became the recipient of two Grammy Awards for Best R&B Song (with Prince as its songwriter) and Best Female R&B Vocal Performance for Khan. In 2026, Khan's recording was selected by the Library of Congress for preservation in the National Recording Registry for its "cultural, historical or aesthetic importance in the nation's recorded sound heritage."

== Background and other versions ==
Prince originally wrote "I Feel For You" and his hit single "I Wanna Be Your Lover" for musician Patrice Rushen, but she turned down both songs. Prince subsequently recorded them for his eponymous second album, which was released in October 1979. For the song, Prince uses a falsetto vocal with the melody range between C_{3} and D_{5}.

The Pointer Sisters recorded the song in 1982 on their album So Excited!, and Rebbie Jackson recorded it for her 1984 debut album Centipede. In 1993, Britney Spears and Justin Timberlake sang this song on The Mickey Mouse Club.

In October 2019, in honor of the 40th anniversary of the album Prince, the Prince Estate and Warner Records released a previously unheard solo acoustic demo recording of the song, with Prince also performing acoustic guitar. The track became available on streaming services and as a limited-run 7” vinyl single which sold out.

== Personnel ==
Information taken from Benoît Clerc and Guitarcloud.

- Prince – lead and backing vocals, electric guitars, clavinet, Oberheim Four Voice, bass guitar, drums, Pollard Syndrums, handclaps

== Chaka Khan version ==
"I Feel for You"
- 7-inch variant of standard artwork

Single by Chaka Khan

from the album I Feel for You
- B-side: "Chinatown"
- Released: August 1984
- Genre: Electro-funk
- Length: 5:46 (album version); 4:03 (single version)
- Label: Warner Bros.
- Songwriter: Prince
- Producer: Arif Mardin

Chaka Khan singles chronology
| "Ain't Nobody" (1983) | "I Feel for You" (1984) | "This Is My Night" (1985) |

Music video
- "I Feel for You" on YouTube

Chaka Khan's version of "I Feel for You" featured a supporting cast including rapping from Melle Mel (of Grandmaster Flash and the Furious Five); guitar, drum programming, bass guitar, keyboards and arrangement by Reggie Griffin; bass synthesizer and programming by The System's David Frank using an Oberheim DSX sequencer, which was connected to his Minimoog via CV and gate; and chromatic harmonica playing by Stevie Wonder. The song also uses vocal samples from Wonder's song "Fingertips" (1963). The repetition of Khan's name by Melle Mel at the beginning of the song was a mistake made by producer Arif Mardin, who then decided to keep it.

This version of the song sold more than one million copies in the US and UK, helping to relaunch Khan's career and becoming her biggest hit as a solo artist. The song hit No. 1 on the Cash Box singles chart and peaked at No. 3 on the Billboard Hot 100 chart from the weeks of November 24, 1984 to December 8, 1984. The song remained on the Billboard Hot 100 for 26 weeks and became one of Billboard's five biggest pop songs of the year for 1985. The single reached No. 1 on both the US Hot Dance/Disco and Hot Black Singles charts in late 1984, remaining atop both for three weeks each. In addition, the song also reached No. 1 on the UK Singles Chart, remaining there for three weeks from November 4–25, 1984. While touring with Prince in 1998 in support of her collaborative album, Come 2 My House, Khan and Prince performed "I Feel for You" as a duet.

Khan's version of the song is written in the key of G♭ major with a tempo of 125 beats per minute in common time. Khan's vocals span from D♭_{4} to A♭_{5} in the song.

In 1985 at the 27th Annual Grammy Awards, the Chaka Khan version of "I Feel for You" won the Grammy for Best R&B Vocal Performance, Female.

=== Music video ===
The first version of the music video for Khan's song featured her working in a club with female dancers. As rap music and breakdancing were gaining popularity in mainstream pop culture at the time, the song was released and proved a success, so another version of the video, in an inner-city courtyard setting, was created.

Director Jane Simpson — who had graduated from UCLA's film school and worked in animation before moving to work on commercials — was brought in as the director for what would be her first music video. Simpson and the production company who produced Chaka Khan’s video for the track had already been working on a video combining some of the early 1980s day-glo fashions with breakdancing and rap. Simpson had already approached several designers who had rejected her concept before Norma Kamali agreed to let her clothing designs appear in the video, which was originally titled “Street Beat”, and shot in a studio mocked-up to look like the multi-racial hip hop club Radio-Tron in the MacArthur Park area in L.A. The choreographer was Joanne DiVito; break dancers appearing in the footage were Shabba Doo, Boogaloo Shrimp, Bruno "Pop N Taco" Falcon and Ana "Lollipop" Sánchez, all of whom also appeared in the movie Breakin'. To this pre-shot footage was added new footage of Chaka Khan and deejay Chris "The Glove" Taylor spinning a hot pink-colored 12-inch single with “Chaka” printed on the label, as well as Khan standing near a chain-link fence and other props, including graffiti-covered panels, on a studio soundstage.

A remixed version of the video was later created to match the 12-inch vinyl version of the single.

=== Personnel ===
- Chaka Khan – lead vocals, backing vocals
- Steve Ferrone – drums
- David Frank – keyboards, synthesizer, programming
- Philippe Saisse – keyboards, synthesizer, programming
- Robbie Buchanan – keyboards, synthesizer, programming
- Reggie Griffin – guitar, bass, keyboards, synthesizer, drum machine, programming and arrangement
- Stevie Wonder – chromatic harmonica
- Grandmaster Melle Mel – vocals
- Mark Williamson – vocals

=== Charts ===
==== Weekly charts ====
Weekly chart performance for "I Feel for You"
| Chart (1984–1985) | Peak position |
|---|---|
| Australia (Kent Music Report) | 4 |
| Austria (Ö3 Austria Top 40) | 14 |
| Belgium (Ultratop 50 Flanders) | 8 |
| Brazil (ABPD) | 9 |
| Canada Top Singles (RPM) | 2 |
| Canada (The Record) | 4 |
| Europe (European Hot 100 Singles) | 5 |
| Finland (Suomen virallinen lista) | 11 |
| France (SNEP) | 22 |
| Guatemala (UPI) | 5 |
| Honduras (UPI) | 5 |
| Ireland (IRMA) | 1 |
| Netherlands (Dutch Top 40) | 7 |
| Netherlands (Single Top 100) | 12 |
| New Zealand (Recorded Music NZ) | 2 |
| Norway (VG-lista) | 8 |
| Sweden (Sverigetopplistan) | 7 |
| Switzerland (Schweizer Hitparade) | 6 |
| UK Singles (OCC) | 1 |
| US Billboard Hot 100 | 3 |
| US Dance Club Songs (Billboard) | 1 |
| US Hot Black Singles (Billboard) | 1 |
| West Germany (GfK) | 4 |

==== Year-end charts ====
1984 year-end chart performance for "I Feel for You"
| Chart (1984) | Position |
|---|---|
| Belgium (Ultratop) | 30 |
| Brazil (ABPD) | 67 |
| Canada Top Singles (RPM) | 64 |
| Netherlands (Dutch Top 40) | 19 |
| Netherlands (Single Top 100) | 29 |
| UK Singles (OCC) | 12 |

1985 year-end chart performance for "I Feel for You"
| Chart (1985) | Position |
|---|---|
| Australia (Kent Music Report) | 91 |
| Brazil (ABPD) | 53 |
| Canada Top Singles (RPM) | 62 |
| US Billboard Hot 100 | 5 |
| West Germany (Media Control) | 62 |

=== Certifications and sales ===
Certifications and sales for "I Feel for You"
| Region | Certification | Certified units/sales |
|---|---|---|
| United Kingdom (BPI) | Platinum | 639,000 |
| United States (RIAA) | Platinum | 1,000,000^{‡} |
^{‡} Sales+streaming figures based on certification alone.

== See also ==
- List of number-one dance hits (United States)
