= The Very Best of Rufus with Chaka Khan =

1982 greatest hits album by Rufus with Chaka Khan

Greatest hits album by Rufus with Chaka Khan
- Released: 1982
- Recorded: 1974–1979
- Genre: Soul, funk
- Length: 42:54
- Label: MCA
- Producer: Rufus, Bob Monaco, Quincy Jones, Roy Halee

Rufus chronology
Camouflage (1981)	The Very Best of Rufus featuring Chaka Khan (with Chaka Khan) (1982)	Seal in Red (1983)

Chaka Khan chronology
Chaka Khan (1982)	The Very Best of Rufus with Chaka Khan (1982)	Stompin' at the Savoy - Live (1983)

The Very Best of Rufus with Chaka Khan is a greatest hits album by funk band Rufus and singer Chaka Khan, released on the MCA Records label in 1982. The collection comprises ten of the group's biggest hits on the ABC/MCA labels, including "You Got the Love", "Sweet Thing", "At Midnight (My Love Will Lift You Up)", "Do You Love What You Feel", "Tell Me Something Good", "Stay", "Hollywood" and "Dance Wit Me".

== Release and reception ==
The Very Best of... was released in late 1982, prior to the recording of the band's two final albums, both for the Warner Bros. Records label, and does consequently not include their hits "Ain't Nobody" and "One Million Kisses", both from the 1983 double-set Stompin' at the Savoy - Live. However, it doesn't contain any material from their 1973 self-titled debut album or their recent album at the time, 1981's Camouflage. It also doesn't contain any material from the Khan-less albums Numbers (1979) and Party 'Til You're Broke (1981).

The album was re-released on CD by MCA/Geffen Records in the mid 1990s in both the US and Europe and is to date the only career retrospective available with the band. Rufus and Chaka Khan's ABC/MCA back catalogue (1973–1982) is as of 2003 distributed by the Universal Music Group.

In a contemporary review, Billboard said the compilation revisits the group's "spine-tingling brand of soul-gone-funk", which remains potent because of Khan's singing. Village Voice critic Robert Christgau said the compilation contained Khan's "great Rufus songs". AllMusic gave it four-and-a-half out of five stars, and Dave Thompson gave the record an eight out of 10 in his 2001 book Funk. "All the hits and no misses", he wrote. "A great comp".

== Track listing ==
No.	Title	Writer(s)	Length
1.	"Do You Love What You Feel" (from Masterjam, 1979)	David Wolinski	4:30
2.	"Tell Me Something Good" (from Rags to Rufus, 1974)	Stevie Wonder	4:40
3.	"Dance Wit Me" (from Rufus featuring Chaka Khan, 1975)	Gavin Christopher	4:00
4.	"Hollywood" (from Ask Rufus, 1977)	André Fischer, David Wolinski	4:09
5.	"Stay" (from Street Player, 1978)	Richard Calhoun, Chaka Khan	5:42
6.	"Once You Get Started" (from Rufusized, 1974)	Gavin Christopher	4:31
7.	"You Got the Love" (from Rags to Rufus, 1974)	Chaka Khan, Ray Parker Jr.	4:45
8.	"At Midnight (My Love Will Lift You Up)" (from Ask Rufus, 1977)	Tony Maiden, Lalomie Washburn	4:21
9.	"Please Pardon Me (You Remind Me of a Friend)" (from Rufusized, 1974)	Brenda Gordon, Brian Russell	3:06
10.	"Sweet Thing" (from Rufus featuring Chaka Khan, 1975)	Chaka Khan, Tony Maiden	3:20
