= John Robinson (drummer) =

American drummer (born 1954)

John "JR" Robinson
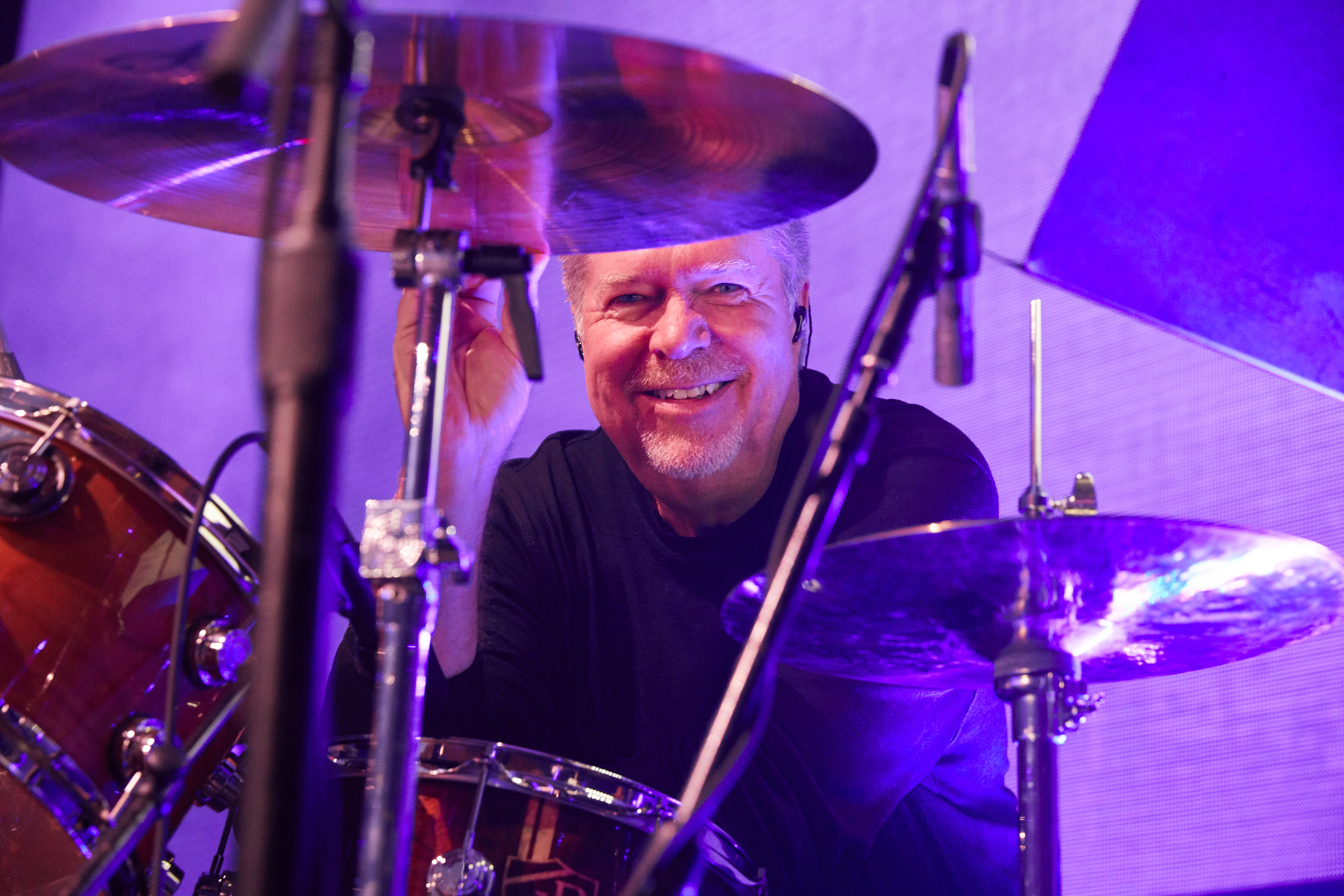
- Robinson in 2017

Background information
- Also known as: JR, Time Machine
- Born: John Frederick Robinson; December 29, 1954 (age 71); Creston, Iowa, U.S.
- Genres: Rock, funk, pop, jazz
- Occupation: Musician
- Instrument: Drums
- Years active: 1973–present
- Website: johnjrrobinson.com

John Frederick Robinson (born December 29, 1954), known professionally as JR, is an American drummer and session musician who has been called "one of the most recorded drummers in history". He is known for his work with producer Quincy Jones, including Michael Jackson's multi-platinum Off the Wall album and the charity single "We Are the World". JR's drum fill kicks off Jackson's chart topper "Rock with You", and his drum solo opens the Steve Winwood album Back in the High Life (1986) to begin the number 1 song "Higher Love".

Rolling Stone listed JR in 2016 at number 81 in their list of the top 100 "Greatest Drummers of All Time". He was awarded one Grammy Award for the Rufus and Chaka Khan single "Ain't Nobody", but has played drums on more than fifty Grammy winning works.

JR plays in many different styles. His first fame came with the funk band Rufus, and he recorded dance/funk hits with the Pointer Sisters. In the pop and rock fields, his work stretches from the straight-up rock of John Fogerty, Bonnie Raitt and Peter Frampton to the mainstream pop of Lady Gaga, Daft Punk, Wilson Phillips and Madonna. JR has backed many contemporary R&B singers including Whitney Houston, Lionel Richie and Anita Baker, as well as vocal pop/soft rock singers such as Barbra Streisand, Seal, Peter Cetera and Rod Stewart. He played on a string of pure country hits by George Strait, Clint Black and Toby Keith. In the 1990s, his film score assignments shifted into high gear, drumming for Hans Zimmer, Christophe Beck and James Newton Howard. And throughout JR's career he has collaborated with jazz artists ranging from Jeff Lorber to David Benoit to Sadao Watanabe. JR said he is "a chameleon kind of drummer".

== Early life ==
JR was born on December 29, 1954, in Creston, Iowa. His parents, Helen Sloan and Jack Robinson, made certain he had an education in music, starting him in piano lessons at age five. JR's father played violin as a hobby, and his mother played him big band records, pointing out the elements of swing. Robinson senior was also the arranger for the local choir Creston Chorus. Both his grandfathers were musical. His favorite record at age seven was "When the Saints Go Marching In" from the soundtrack of the 1959 film The Five Pennies. At eight he got his first drum kit – a secondhand 1940s Ludwig set with no toms, just snare, bass, hi-hat and one Zildjian cymbal. At age ten he formed a duo with Kevin Clemens who played electric guitar. His next drum kit was a new 1966 Ludwig Champagne Sparkle set. Tall and athletic, JR wavered between a basketball or music career, choosing music. At 14, he performed with the Iowa Big Band, and he played drums in high school band, using a maple Ludwig drum kit in White Marine Pearl. JR went to jazz band camp at Northwest Missouri State University and Illinois State University where he met drummer/teacher Ed Soph who helped JR break some of his bad habits, training him in traditional grip. Soph encouraged him to enroll at Berklee College of Music in Boston.

JR gigged with the Tommy Dorsey Band in 1973, finding that the old, yellowed charts were very extensive, more than 1200 songs. In August 1973, the Pointer Sisters opened for Chicago at the Veterans Memorial Coliseum in Des Moines. JR attended the concert, and he was moved by the Pointer Sisters' songs "Cloudburst" and "Yes We Can Can". He said he "always wanted to play with them". Seven years later he played on the Pointer Sisters' hit song "Slow Hand".

Arriving at Berklee in 1973, JR was taught by drum educator and theorist Gary Chaffee who advocated linear drumming, and jazz drummer Alan Dawson. JR's schoolmates included bass guitarist Neil Stubenhaus and drummers Steve Smith, Kenwood Dennard, Vinnie Colaiuta and Casey Scheuerell. Dawson helped change JR's bass drum footing to a heel-down style, which took years to master. JR studied xylophone and vibraphone with Dave Samuels, and they gigged together. By 1974, JR was working as a studio musician for Professor John LaPorta who needed a precise drummer for his teaching tapes.

== Career ==
=== Rufus, Quincy, Michael Jackson ===
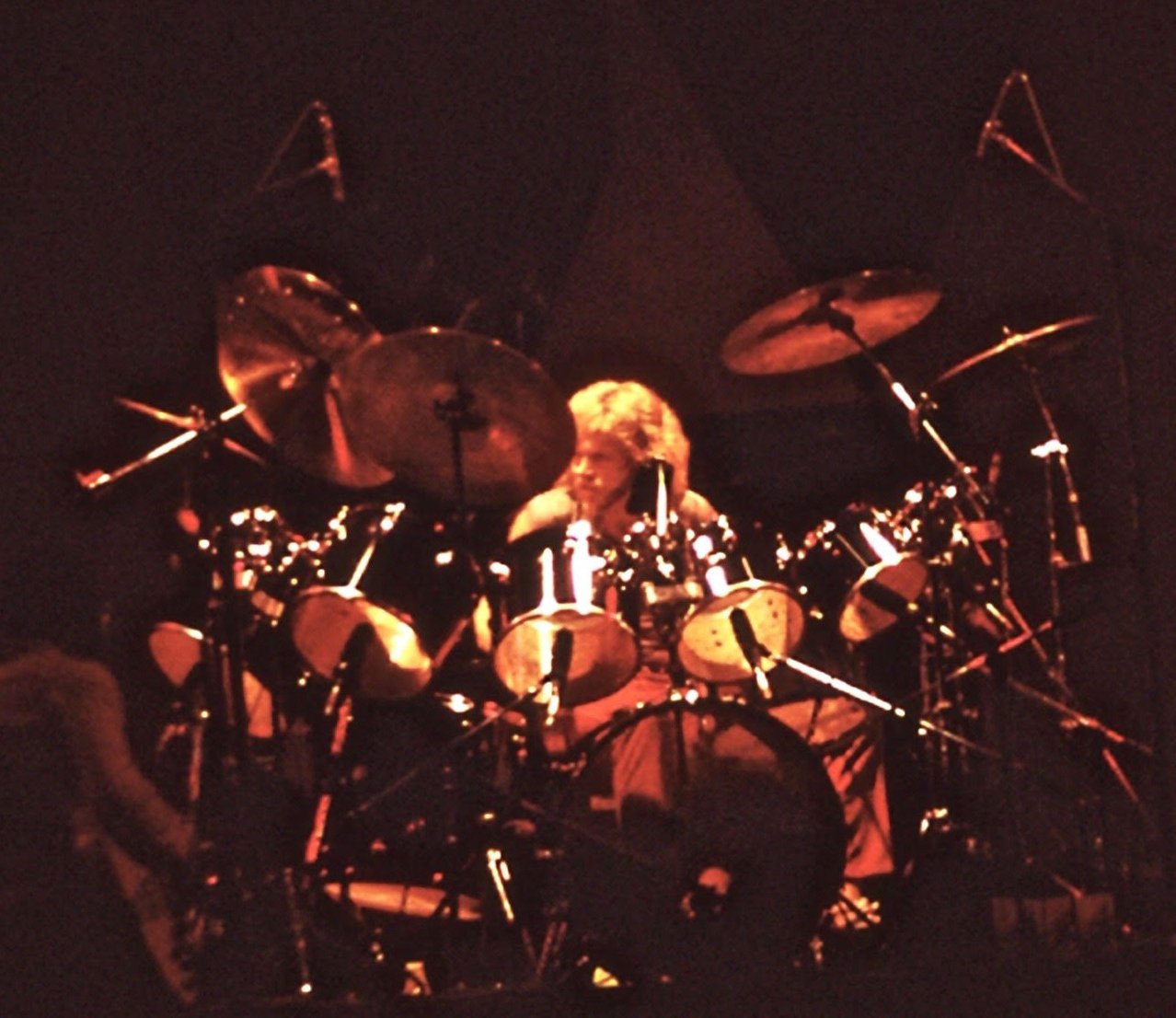
JR in 1980 performing with Rufus

After five semesters of Berklee classes, JR left school but stayed in Boston to focus on gigging. He toured in a band called Shelter, and in March 1978 at the Rare Cherry nightclub outside of Cleveland, his band was surprised to find they were opening for Rufus and Chaka Khan. After the Shelter set, Rufus and Chaka Khan came on stage to ask JR to stay and play with them. This invitation extended through the whole evening. Two weeks later, JR moved to Los Angeles to fill their touring drummer position. The first gig was in Hawaii, where JR met Danny Seraphine, founding drummer of Chicago, who encouraged JR to sign an endorsement contract with drum manufacturer Slingerland. JR recorded with Rufus in 1978 on the album Numbers released in early 1979, which rose to number 81 on the Billboard 200. Producer Quincy Jones led the next album project Masterjam for Rufus. Masterjam was recorded in late 1978 and released in November 1979. The single "Do You Love What You Feel", featuring Chaka Khan on vocals, crossed over to number 30 on the Hot 100. Jones was the person who first started calling John Robinson by the nickname JR. Before Masterjam came out, Jones brought JR to Michael Jackson's album project Off the Wall in December 1978. The first thing JR did on the project was go to Allen Zentz Recording Studios to overdub drums for the songs "Girlfriend" and "It's the Falling in Love", replacing the previous drummer's work. Jones listened to the results, conferred with Jackson, and then invited JR to be the drummer for the rest of the album. JR remembers going to Westlake Recording Studios to cut basic tracks for "Don't Stop 'Til You Get Enough" with just keys, bass and drums. The trio was Louis Johnson on bass, JR, and keyboardist Greg Phillinganes: this was the first time JR had met Phillinganes. After they recorded the track, Phillinganes stood on the piano bench with his hands up, exultant. Everyone knew they had just laid the foundation for a hit. Released in August 1979, Off the Wall netted JR three hit singles: "Don't Stop 'Til You Get Enough" (number 1), "Rock with You" (number 1), and "Off the Wall" (number 10). From this point forward, JR was a first-request drummer for Jones.

JR was on the road with Rufus and Chaka Khan for ten months in 1980 – his longest tour. During a brief stop, he spent one day recording George Benson's Give Me the Night. He helped on a few of Karen Carpenter's solo album tracks, which were not released until 16 years later. In 1981, JR recorded Party 'Til You're Broke with Rufus, yielding the hit single "Tonight We Love". Later that year, the Rufus album Camouflage brought JR another hit single, "Sharing the Love", which reached number 8 on the R&B chart. Rufus released Seal in Red in 1983, and JR also played on the Rufus/Chaka Khan single "Ain't Nobody" which topped the R&B chart and rose to number 22 on the Hot 100. "Ain't Nobody" earned a Grammy Award for Best R&B Performance at the 26th Annual Grammy Awards in early '84, which is JR's only Grammy. JR said that he recorded his part for "Ain't Nobody" at Amigo Studios in Hollywood, replacing a drum machine demo track with his own ideas, but keeping a robotic feel. He first played kick and snare alone, then overdubbed the hi-hat, then another pass for toms. This was a common practice in the 1980s to keep the drum parts isolated.

Other projects during this time included some dates with the Temptations and the Four Tops, the Brothers Johnson album Light Up the Night (1980), Quincy Jones' album The Dude (1981), Louis Johnson's gospel album Passage for A&M, and six songs with JR as drummer on the Patti Austin album Every Home Should Have One which produced the hugely successful hit duet with James Ingram, "Baby, Come to Me". Bassist Stanley Clarke used JR for one song, "We Supply", on Rocks, Pebbles and Sand (1980). JR covered drum duties for two songs on the Herbie Hancock album Magic Windows (1981), and also for his next album Lite Me Up. The Pointer Sisters' 1981 album Black & White birthed the hit single "Slow Hand". Jazz keyboardist Jeff Lorber put JR on the drum throne for his It's a Fact album in 1982, and Lionel Richie used JR's drumming skills for three songs on Lionel Richie (1982) including the big hit "You Are". Jones brought JR to Donna Summer's self-titled album to cut the song "State of Independence".

When the Pointer Sisters were ready for their next album, producer Richard Perry called JR in early 1982 to bring his drums to Perry's own Studio 55 on Melrose Avenue. Once again, JR joined bassist Nathan Watts to form the rhythm section, supporting John Barnes on keys, and a changing lineup of guitarists. Paulinho da Costa added percussion. JR recalled that the music was surprisingly funky for the song "I'm So Excited" which turned out to be a Top 40 hit in 1982, and then a Top 10 hit in 1984 as a remix. Lionel Richie used several drummers including JR on his album Can't Slow Down (1983). In 1982 at Ocean Way Studio A, JR formed a trio with Richie playing Yamaha CS-80 synthesizer and Abraham Laboriel on electric bass. The three of them laid down the basic tracks for "All Night Long (All Night)" to create "the space and grace that the song needed", according to JR. Percussion parts were layered into the mix afterward. The song topped three Billboard charts: pop, R&B and adult contemporary. Glenn Frey pulled JR on the road with him in September–November 1982, starting in Japan and returning to the US; all in support of his solo album No Fun Aloud.

The theme for the 1984 Summer Olympics was "Olympia" by Sérgio Mendes who used JR for acoustic drums and Terry Bozzio for electronic drum programming. Diana Ross called upon JR to record her song "Missing You" (1984). Producer Ted Templeman used JR for the first David Lee Roth solo project Crazy from the Heat (1984). Two hits came from that: a cover of the Beach Boys' "California Girls", and a medley of pop classics "Just a Gigolo" and "I Ain't Got Nobody". Richard Perry used JR for his three songs on Laura Branigan's album Self Control (1984). Phillinganes tapped JR for a couple of songs on his solo album Pulse (1984). DeBarge included some of JR's drums on the album Rhythm of the Night (1985). Eric Clapton put JR on one song from his album Behind the Sun (1985). Benson used JR on a couple of songs from his 1985 album 20/20, including a cover of "Beyond the Sea (La Mer)" which charted in the UK. Whitney Houston cut some tracks with JR in 1984 for her eponymous album, giving JR more number 1 hits: "Saving All My Love for You" in 1985 and "Greatest Love of All" in 1986. Houston's next album used JR on the number 1 hit "Didn't We Almost Have It All" (1987).

Michael Jackson, Lionel Richie and Quincy Jones headed the project USA for Africa to provide relief for the 1983–1985 famine in Ethiopia. To cut the rhythm tracks for the charity single "We Are the World", Jones booked Lion Share Studios in Los Angeles, the old ABC/Dunhill studio where Rufus first recorded, and Jones called JR to cover drums. JR joined bassist Johnson and keyboardist Phillinganes to learn the song from Richie and Jackson with everyone gathered around the piano. JR recalls that when it was time to push the record button, the various industry executives and media people were making too much noise, ruining the vibe, and Jones asked JR to clear them out. JR shouted, "Everyone, get the fuck out, let us record first and then you all can come back in!" Which is exactly what happened. The basic rhythm tracks went down very well, followed the next week by a different recording session for all the celebrity voices. "We Are the World" became one of the best-selling singles of all time.

=== Rock and vocal pop ===
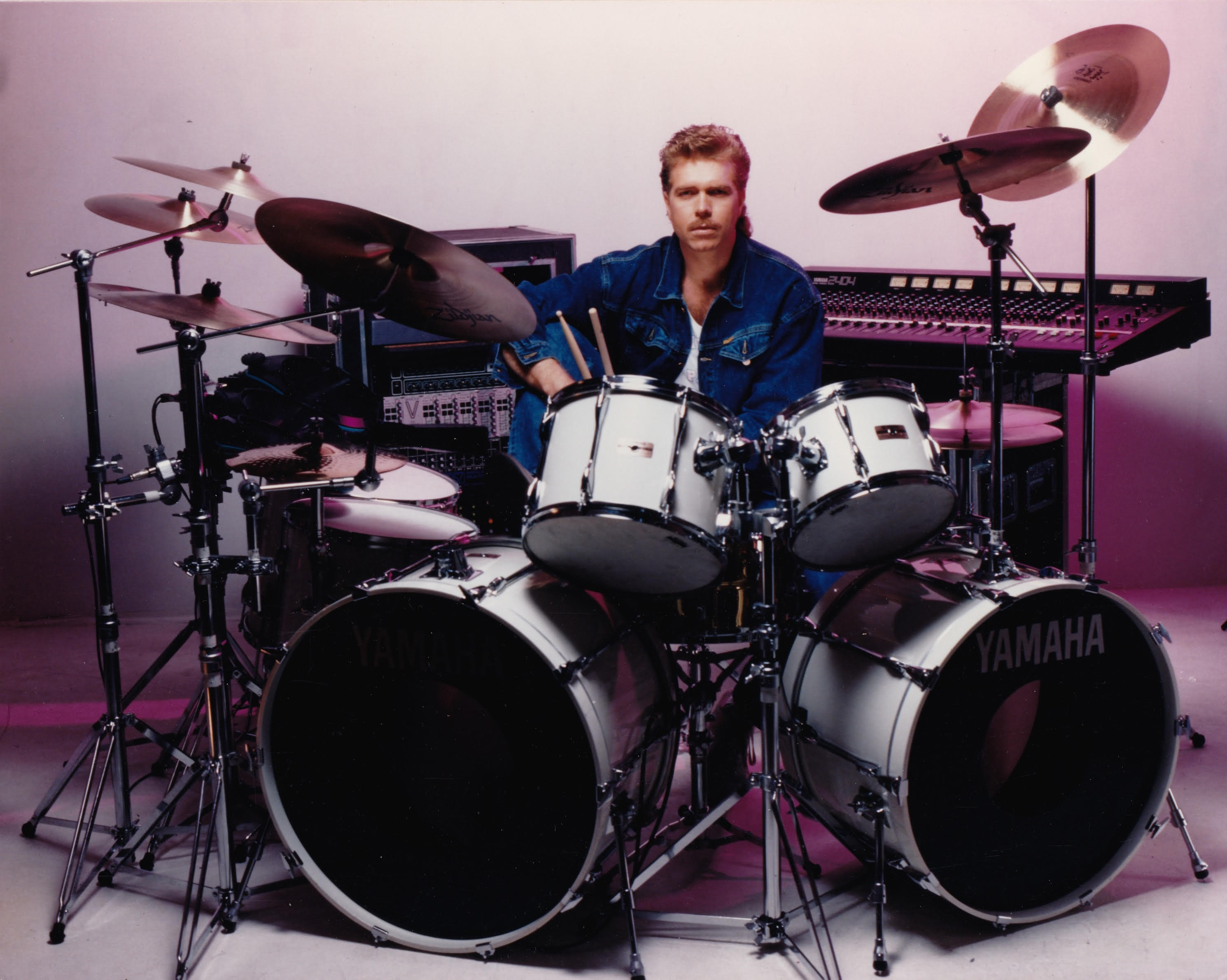
JR pictured with Yamaha drums in 1985. JR mixed his own monitors during live shows, using the Yamaha MC2404 mixer in the rear.

From the mid-1980s, JR played drums for a wide range of rock, soft rock and pop artists. He replaced Russ Kunkel's work on six tracks for Bob Seger's album Like a Rock in 1985, noting that Seger only wanted to hear low-pitched wooden drums – no brass snares. Maurice White used JR for some songs on his solo album Maurice White (1985), on which his cover of "Stand by Me" was a hit. In November 1985, JR was in New York City recording songs for George Benson's While the City Sleeps... album. He was called by Russ Titelman to bring his drums over to Unique Recording Studios, to work on Steve Winwood's upcoming album, Back in the High Life. Titelman and Winwood used various combinations of JR's drums, drum machines, triggered samples and sequenced samples to create the electronic pop sound they were looking for. JR's drum fill on "Higher Love" was originally just JR playing around between songs, hitting rimshots on his vintage brass Ludwig Black Beauty snare to sound like a Latin timbale. Engineer Tom Lord-Alge captured the drum pattern on tape, and shifted it to the beginning of the song. Winwood and Titelman were very happy with the result, and the drum fill was used to open the album. After the song hit number 1 on the Billboard Hot 100 in 1986, the pattern was so famous that JR put it on his answering machine to let callers know they had reached the right man.

JR put together his own band in 1986, recruiting his friend bassist Neil Stubenhaus, guitarist Marty Walsh, and pianist Alan Pasqua. They had been playing gigs together when Warner Bros. Records President Lenny Waronker called JR to catch up. JR told Waronker about his band and Waronker said that John Fogerty (ex–Creedence Clearwater Revival) should be the singer of the band. After working on more than a dozen of Fogerty's song ideas, JR and his band recorded Eye of the Zombie for Fogerty in 1986, then toured to promote the album. On the road serving as musical director, JR sat behind a Yamaha Power Recording drum kit with two bass drums, using flat foot pedal style on the right and toe method on the left. Three hi-hats were used: a 15-inch Zildjian Quick Beats on the left and two linked 13-inch Zildjian K-series on the right. JR said that the tour was disappointing because Fogerty was getting sued by Saul Zaentz and could not play his popular CCR songs.

Other work by JR in this period included Bryan Ferry's Bête Noire (1987), TDK's jazz compilation Joyride (1987), Agnetha Fältskog's I Stand Alone (1987) and Boz Scaggs Other Roads (1988). Michael Jackson's album Bad was recorded for more than a year during 1985–87. JR drummed on six of the album's songs: "Bad", "The Way You Make Me Feel", "Speed Demon", "Liberian Girl", "Dirty Diana" and "Smooth Criminal". Four were Top 40 hits.

In 1988, JR was called by producer Patrick Leonard to work on Madonna's album Like a Prayer. With his longtime drum tech John Good (later with Drum Workshop), JR brought his drums to Leonard's own Johnny Yuma Studios in Hollywood, to set up for the session. The session stalled, waiting for Madonna to show up, because she prefers to be present when the drums are recorded. But JR could not wait and recorded his drums for "Express Yourself" anyway. When Madonna appeared and was introduced to JR, he said he thought the song was "smokin'". Madonna listened to the drums on tape and said, "It's fucking great!"

Producer Glen Ballard (Pointer Sisters, Patti Austin) leaned heavily on JR for a pair of albums by Wilson Phillips, including Wilson Phillips in 1990 and Shadows and Light in 1992. These projects put six more Top 40 singles into JR's discography. Ballard also brought JR into Curtis Stigers' debut album (1991), yielding two Hot 100 chart singles, followed by K. T. Oslin's retrospective album Songs from an Aging Sex Bomb and Lea Salonga's eponymous album, both in 1993.

In 1989, Quincy Jones used JR on the quiet storm song, "The Secret Garden (Sweet Seduction Suite)" (1990), featuring singers Al B. Sure!, James Ingram, El DeBarge and Barry White. Jones also put JR on the song "Tomorrow (A Better You, Better Me)", with Tevin Campbell on vocals, which hit number 75.

=== 1990s ===
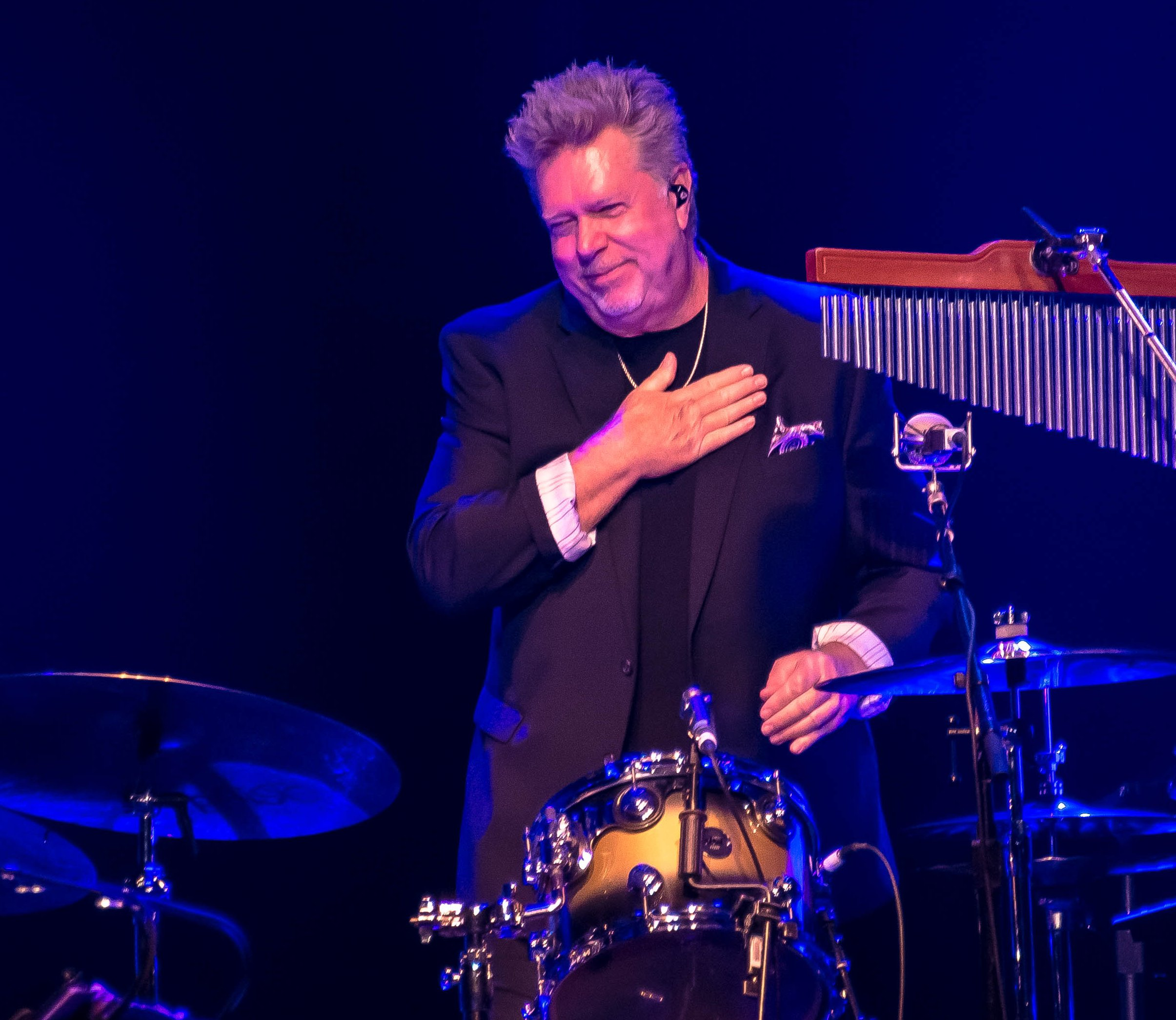
JR performing on David Foster's The Hitman Tour in Ottawa, 2019

JR was present for a handful of jazz dates with Herbie Hancock, Jeff Lorber and George Benson in the '80s, and in the 1990s he picked up more jazz work. Quincy Jones used JR on the album Q's Jook Joint which rose to number 1 on the jazz charts. Jazz pianist David Benoit employed JR on his 1991 album Shadows. English composer Mike Oldfield picked JR for one track on his album Tubular Bells II (1993). With JR on six tracks, Lorber's album Worth Waiting For rose to number 1 on the Contemporary Jazz chart in 1993. Lorber used JR again on West Side Stories in 1994, reaching number 5 on the same chart.

Mexican singer Luis Miguel decided to record an album in Los Angeles under the Warner umbrella, and JR was chosen as drummer on the project titled 20 Años. Two singles from the album rose to number 1 on the US Hot Latin Songs chart: "Entrégate" and "Tengo Todo Excepto a Ti", both in 1990. British singer-songwriter Seal used four drummers including JR on his 1991 album Seal. The song "Crazy" with JR on drums hit number 7 on the Hot 100. English singer Rod Stewart used JR for his song "Rhythm of My Heart", rising to number 5 on the Hot 100 in 1991. Canadian guitarist Robbie Robertson used JR for two songs on his album Storyville (1991) and again on 1994's Music for The Native Americans. Buffy Sainte-Marie's 1992 album Coincidence and Likely Stories was assisted by JR.

Barbra Streisand took JR on tour in 1993–94 for Barbra Streisand in Concert. After this, JR was always Streisand's concert drummer. Titelman brought JR into the Michael McDonald album Blink of an Eye (1993). In 1995, JR toured with English guitarist Peter Frampton, recording the concerts to create the live album Frampton Comes Alive! II. He also contributed to Jennifer Love Hewitt's debut album Let's Go Bang (1995) and performed the drums on the Tony Banks and Jack Hues collaborative album Strictly Inc. Clapton and Babyface used JR on drums and Nathan East on bass for the song "Change the World", recorded at the Record Plant in L.A.; the song appeared in the 1996 film Phenomenon and won a Grammy. In 1997, JR was one of two drummers on Clint Black's album Nothin' but the Taillights, then in '99 JR was the only drummer on his next album D'lectrified, which put two singles on the Hot 100. JR has participated annually in Celebrity Fight Night, a charity event held in Arizona to benefit the Muhammad Ali Parkinson Center at Barrow Neurological Institute. The event has been under the musical direction of David Foster since 1999. JR backed Barbra Streisand in 1999–2000 on her Timeless tour.

=== Later work ===
Country artist Toby Keith used JR for his album Pull My Chain (2001), which added three songs to the Hot 100. JR also played on his next album, Unleashed (2002). In 2006–07, JR joined television composer Mike Post in the band L.A. Blues Alliance, made up of local session musicians. The band released the blues album What a Life in May 2007. JR helped celebrate the 75th birthday of Quincy Jones in Montreux, Switzerland, in July 2008. A video album was made of the party, Quincy Jones: The 75th Birthday Celebration – Live at Montreux. JR backed a wide range of vocalists with a band consisting of himself, keyboardists Greg Phillinganes and David Delhomme, guitarist Paul Jackson Jr., bassist Nathan East, and percussionist Paulinho da Costa. Seal used JR on his cover of "Stand By Me" in 2008. Starting in 2010, JR toured with David Foster, backing singers such as Peter Cetera, the Tenors, Ruben Studdard, Charice and Natalie Cole.

In 2006, Robinson joined greats such as Leland Sklar and Chris Botti on Andy Williams final studio album "I Don't Remember Ever Growing Up".

In 2012, joining bassist Nathan East, JR recorded with Daft Punk on their album Random Access Memories. The single "Lose Yourself to Dance" topped the Dance Club chart. "Instant Crush" performed well on Hot Dance/Electronic, and the album's opening cut "Give Life Back to Music" peaked at number 9 on the Dance Club chart. JR said that some of the songs on that project had multiple drummers contributing separately, such as the song "Giorgio by Moroder" which used Omar Hakim in New York and JR in Los Angeles. The same year, Oldfield relied on JR for the 2012 Summer Olympics opening ceremony. Lisa Stansfield used JR for her album Seven, especially for the track "Can't Dance". Oldfield brought JR into his 2014 project Man on the Rocks, and New Zealander Kimbra used JR for her 2014 album The Golden Echo.

JR served as drummer on the Lady Gaga song "Stupid Love" (2020) which rose to number 5 on the Billboard Hot 100.

=== Solo work ===
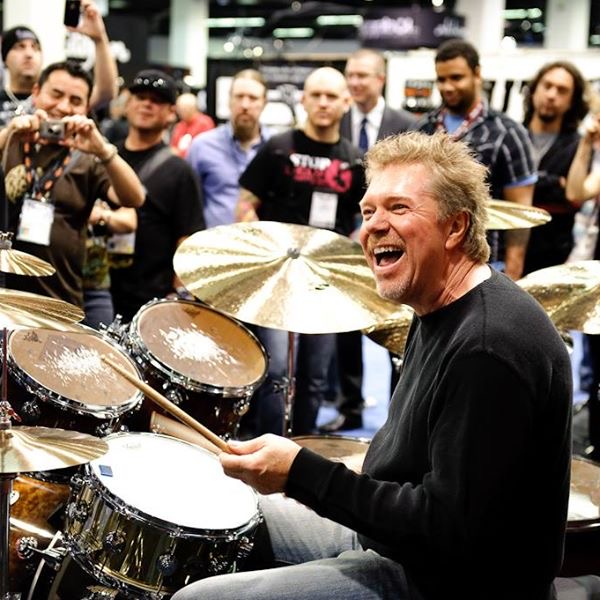
JR at the NAMM Show in 2011, demonstrating his 24-inch Signature Deep Heavy Ride and his 24-inch 2002-Series Swish Ride Paiste cymbals

JR formed the short-lived band Bridge 2 Far (1989) with singer Mark Williamson, and again with Williamson in the trio TRW with guitarist Michael Thompson. TRW released the album Rivers of Paradise on Frontiers Records in 2007. With the band Native Son, JR released Son Talk in 2011 on the label King Japan. Native Son is Thompson (guitar), JR (drums), Bobby Watson (sax) and Mo Pleasure (bass).

JR has released two solo albums: Funkshui (2004) and Platinum (2007). He said that the songs on Platinum consisted mainly of funk and rock, recorded at his Thousand Oaks home studio, Home Court, using a Yamaha Pro Audio DM2000 digital mixing console. He was inducted into the Iowa Rock 'n Roll Music Association Hall of Fame in 2005 and Rock Godz Hall Of Fame in 2019. JR hosts the "Vinyl Night" radio show at EnterTalk Radio.

=== Film and television ===
JR has played drums for many film scores, always following a pre-written chart. He said that film work is the most challenging, as it requires a higher degree of concentration and focus. His film and television credits include 2009's The Hangover interpreting a score by Christophe Beck, Ordinary People for Marvin Hamlisch in 1980, Grand Canyon (1991), My Cousin Vinny (1992), The Bodyguard (1992), Space Jam (1996), That Thing You Do! (1996), Escape from L.A. (1996), Jerry Maguire (1996), Independence Day (1996), The Story of Us (1999), and Batman v Superman: Dawn of Justice (2016). JR joined Beck again on the film Hot Pursuit in 2015. For Man of Steel (2013), JR was the leader of multiple drummers recorded in 5.1 surround sound, arranged by Hans Zimmer.

On television, JR played for the ER series (1994), and he has served multiple times as the drummer for the Academy Awards broadcast orchestra. Joining sax player Tom Scott and bassist Nathan East, JR scored the music and drummed on the HBO documentary The Bronx, USA in which the video "Gonna Be Alright" emerged (2019), about talent agent George Shapiro.

== Drum equipment ==
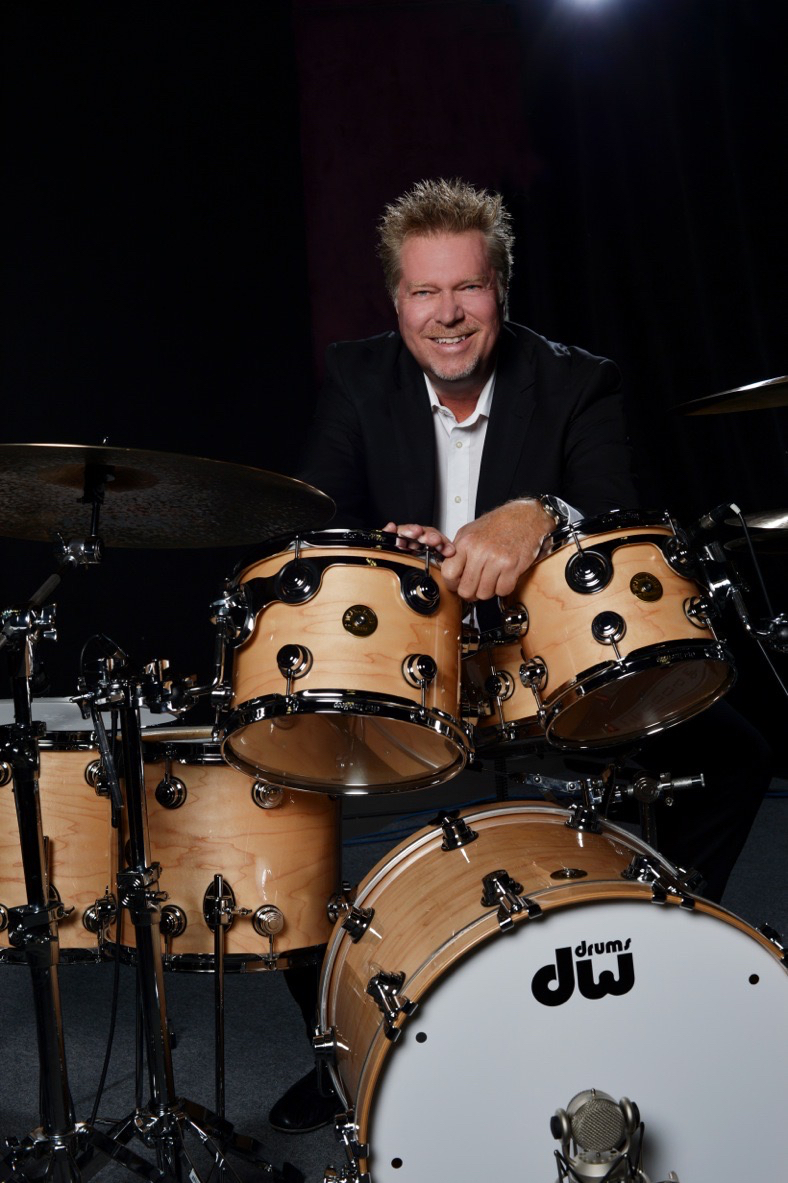
JR endorsed Drum Workshop (DW) drums starting in 2009

Around 1979 through the efforts of Chicago drummer Danny Seraphine, Slingerland Drum Company picked up JR as an endorser. He said he preferred double-headed tom drums for their responsiveness, but played with single heads when a recording project required it. JR endorsed Yamaha drums starting in 1981. Yamaha produced a 5×15 signature snare designed by JR, with a thin 4-ply birch shell ringed by a combination of 4-ply birch reinforcing hoops and 19-ply vintage wood hoops. The snare wires were unusual: 25-strand carbon steel in a larger bed of 2.7 mm. A second signature snare by JR was a thicker 7-ply birch shell, 5.5×14 with copper nails around the perimeter, and 3 mm zinc hoops. Along with Mitch Mitchell, JR was partial to the ASBA Caroline kick drum pedal for its greater adjustability. In 1990–91, JR helped test the first Axis Percussion kick drum pedals.

Zildjian's longtime artist relations man, Lenny DiMuzio, signed JR around 1980. Rich Mangicaro of Paiste cymbals signed JR to an endorsement deal in March 2006, collaborating with JR to develop the 24-inch Masters Deep Ride cymbal, and the 24-inch "Signature Groove" Swish Ride cymbal, made from Paiste's 2002-series CuSn8 bronze copper alloy containing 8% tin, unfinished underneath for complexity. In October of 2024 JR started endorsing Istanbul Mehmet cymbals.

In 2007, Yamaha produced another JR Signature snare, this one made of birch with bird's eye maple on the outer surface. It was 6.5×14 in size, again with copper nails around the bearing edge, to thicken the sound. In 2009 after Yamaha changed their artist relations staff, JR shifted to endorse Drum Workshop (DW) drums, reconnecting with his old drum tech John Good who was now vice president of the company.

JR takes part in drum workshops and industry conventions such as NAMM Show in Anaheim, Drummer's Reality Camp in Pasadena, Musikmesse Frankfurt, the Bag'Show in Paris, and Percussive Arts Society International Convention (PASIC) in Indianapolis. JR served as a judge at the 2002 Collegiate Jazz Festival at Notre Dame. In 2011, JR released an instructional video for drummers, titled John JR Robinson: The Time Machine. JR's drum tech, John Oreshnick, appears on the video, as well as David Foster, Nathan East, Paul Jackson, Abraham Laboriel and Luis Conte. The video was named DVD of the Year by Modern Drummer.

== Billboard Hot 100 singles ==
JR played drums on these songs that appeared on the Billboard Hot 100 chart:

Artist	Song	Year	Peak
Michael Jackson	"Don't Stop 'Til You Get Enough"	1979	1
Michael Jackson	"Rock with You"	1979	1
Rufus	"Do You Love What You Feel"	1979	30
The Brothers Johnson	"Stomp!"	1980	7
George Benson	"Love X Love"	1980	61
George Benson	"Give Me the Night"	1980	4
Michael Jackson	"Off the Wall"	1980	10
Michael Jackson	"She's Out of My Life"	1980	10
The Pointer Sisters	"Slow Hand"	1981	2
Rufus	"Sharing the Love"	1981	91
Quincy Jones	"Just Once"	1981	17
Quincy Jones	"One Hundred Ways"	1981	14
The Pointer Sisters	"I'm So Excited" (original)	1982	30
The Pointer Sisters	"Should I Do It"	1982	13
Patti Austin and James Ingram	"Baby, Come to Me"	1982	1
Donna Summer	"State of Independence"	1982	41
Lionel Richie	"You Are"	1983	4
Rufus and Chaka Khan	"Ain't Nobody"	1983	22
Lionel Richie	"All Night Long (All Night)"	1983	1
The Pointer Sisters	"I'm So Excited" (remix)	1984	9
David Lee Roth	"California Girls"	1984	3
Diana Ross	"Missing You"	1984	10
David Lee Roth	"Just a Gigolo"	1984	12
USA for Africa	"We Are the World"	1985	1
Christopher Cross	"Charm the Snake"	1985	68
Lionel Richie	"Say You, Say Me"	1985	1
Whitney Houston	"Saving All My Love for You"	1985	1
Maurice White	"Stand by Me"	1985	50
Steve Winwood	"Higher Love"	1986	1
Maurice White	"I Need You"	1986	95
Whitney Houston	"Greatest Love of All"	1986	1
Lionel Richie	"Dancing on the Ceiling"	1986	2
Steve Winwood	"Back in the High Life Again"	1986	13
Stabilizers	"One Simple Thing"	1986	93
Anita Baker	"No One in the World"	1987	44
Steve Winwood	"The Finer Things"	1987	8
Michael Jackson	"Bad"	1987	1
Whitney Houston	"Didn't We Almost Have It All"	1987	1
Michael Jackson	"The Way You Make Me Feel"	1987	1
Michael Jackson	"Dirty Diana"	1988	1
Steve Winwood	"Don't You Know What the Night Can Do?"	1988	6
Siedah Garrett	"K.I.S.S.I.N.G."	1988	97
Peter Cetera	"One Good Woman"	1988	4
Michael Jackson	"Smooth Criminal"	1988	7
Madonna	"Express Yourself"	1989	2
Wilson Phillips	"Hold On"	1990	1
Wilson Phillips	"Release Me"	1990	1
Quincy Jones and Tevin Campbell	"Tomorrow (A Better You, Better Me)"	1990	75
Wilson Phillips	"Impulsive"	1990	4
Quincy Jones and friends	"The Secret Garden (Sweet Seduction Suite)"	1990	31
Wilson Phillips	"You're in Love"	1991	1
Rod Stewart	"Rhythm of My Heart"	1991	5
Seal	"Crazy"	1991	7
Wilson Phillips	"The Dream Is Still Alive"	1991	12
Curtis Stigers	"I Wonder Why"	1991	9
Wilson Phillips	"You Won't See Me Cry"	1991	20
Curtis Stigers	"You're All That Matters to Me"	1992	98
Jude Cole	"Start the Car"	1992	71
Eric Clapton	"Change the World"	1996	5
Clint Black	"When I Said I Do"	1999	31
Clint Black	"Been There"	2000	44
Toby Keith	"I'm Just Talkin' About Tonight"	2001	27
Toby Keith	"I Wanna Talk About Me"	2001	28
Toby Keith	"My List"	2002	26
The Weeknd	"I Feel It Coming"	2016	4
Lady Gaga	"Stupid Love"	2020	5

== Partial discography ==
=== With Rufus ===
- Numbers
- Masterjam
- Party 'Til You're Broke
- Camouflage
- Seal in Red
- Stompin' at the Savoy – Live – (1983 Grammy win for "Ain't Nobody")

=== As sideman ===
- Patti Austin (Every Home Should Have One – "Baby, Come to Me", Patti Austin, The Real Me)
- Anita Baker (Rapture – "No One in the World")
- David Benoit (Shadows, Inner Motion)
- George Benson (Give Me the Night, While the City Sleeps...)
- Rubén Blades (Nothing But the Truth)
- Laura Branigan (Self Control)
- The Brothers Johnson (Light Up the Night – “Stomp!”, Winners, – “The Real Thing”)
- Peabo Bryson ("I Get Nervous" on Straight from the Heart)
- Larry Carlton (On Solid Ground, Last Nite)
- Karen Carpenter (Karen Carpenter)
- Peter Cetera ("One Good Woman")
- Steven Curtis Chapman (Heaven in the Real World)
- Christopher Cross ("Every Turn of the World")
- Eric Clapton ("Change the World")
- Julien Clerc (Si j'étais elle)
- Natalie Cole (Stardust)
- Daft Punk (Random Access Memories)
- DeBarge (Rhythm of the Night)
- Ned Doheny (Life After Romance)
- El DeBarge (El DeBarge)
- Dennis Edwards (Coolin' Out)
- Agnetha Fältskog (I Stand Alone)
- John Fogerty (Eye of the Zombie, Centerfield)
- David Foster (Hit Man: David Foster & Friends)
- Kenny G ("Silver Bells" on Miracles: The Holiday Album)
- Siedah Garrett (Kiss of Life)
- Herbie Hancock (Magic Windows, Lite Me Up)
- Jennifer Love Hewitt (Let's Go Bang)
- Jennifer Holliday (Get Close to My Love)
- Julio Iglesias (Libra)
- James Ingram ("Right Back" on Never Felt So Good, It's Your Night)
- Michael Jackson (Off the Wall, Bad)
- Paul Jackson Jr. (Out of the Shadows)
- Al Jarreau (My Old Friend: Celebrating George Duke)
- Quincy Jones (The Dude, Back on the Block, Q's Jook Joint, From Q With Love)
- Rickie Lee Jones (Flying Cowboys)
- Chaka Khan (I Feel for You)
- Kahoru Kohiruimaki (Call My Name)
- Bill LaBounty (The Right Direction)
- Josh Leo (Rockin' on 6th)
- Jeff Lorber (It's a Fact, Worth Waiting For, West Side Stories)
- Michael McDonald (Blink of an Eye)
- Madonna (Like a Prayer – "Express Yourself")
- The Manhattan Transfer (Bodies and Souls)
- Sergio Mendes (Confetti)
- Luis Miguel (Busca una Mujer, 20 Años, Aries, Segundo Romance, Mis Romances, 33, Navidades)
- Robbie Nevil (A Place Like This)
- Mike Oldfield (Tubular Bells II, "Man on the Rocks")
- David Pack (The Songs of West Side Story)
- Greg Phillinganes (Pulse)
- Pointer Sisters (Black & White – "Slow Hand", So Excited! – "I'm So Excited", Break Out)
- Art Porter, Jr. (Straight to the Point, Undercover)
- Barbra Streisand ("Timeless" tour)
- Donna Summer (Donna Summer)
- Bonnie Raitt (Nine Lives)
- Helen Reddy (Imagination)
- Lionel Richie (Lionel Richie, Can't Slow Down – "All Night Long (All Night)”, Dancing on the Ceiling – "Dancing on the Ceiling", "Say You, Say Me")
- David Lee Roth ("Just a Gigolo", "California Girls")
- Patrice Rushen (Watch Out)
- Buffy Sainte-Marie (Coincidence and Likely Stories)
- Boz Scaggs (Other Roads)
- Seal (Seal)
- Vonda Shepard (Vonda Shepard)
- Lisa Stansfield (Seven)
- Rod Stewart (Vagabond Heart – "Rhythm of My Heart")
- Curtis Stigers (Curtis Stigers, Time Was)
- George Strait (Pure Country)
- Kathy Troccoli (Kathy Troccoli)
- USA for Africa (We Are the World – "We Are the World")
- Sadao Watanabe (Maisha, Birds of Passage, Front Seat)
- Wilson Phillips (Wilson Phillips – "Hold On", "Release Me", "You're in Love")
- Steve Winwood (Back in the High Life – "Back in the High Life Again", "The Finer Things", "Higher Love", Roll with It)
- Eikichi Yazawa (the Name is ...)
- Yutaka Yokokura (Yutaka)
- Yumi Matsutoya (1987"Before The Diamond Dust Fades"～2013"POP CLASSICO")
- Mari Hamada (1996"Persona")
