= Papillon (Chaka Khan song) =

Single by Chaka Khan

from the album Naughty
- B-side: "Too Much Love"
- Released: June 18, 1980
- Genre: Disco
- Length: 4:11
- Label: Warner Bros. Records
- Songwriter: Gregg Diamond
- Producer: Arif Mardin

Chaka Khan singles chronology
""Clouds"" (1980)	"Papillon" (1980)	""Get Ready, Get Set"" (1980)

Papillon (a.k.a. Hot Butterfly) is a 1978 song by Gregg Diamond, first released as an album track Hot Butterfly on Bionic Boogie by Diamond. However, the best known version is the 1980 hit Papillon by Chaka Khan. The song features vocals by American R&B singer Luther Vandross and a harmonica solo by musician Hugh McCracken.

It was Chaka Khan's most successful single from the album Naughty, though it only peaked at #22 on Billboard's R&B charts.
