= Camouflage (Rufus album) =

1981 studio album by Rufus with Chaka Khan

Studio album by Rufus with Chaka Khan
- Released: October 1981
- Recorded: 1981
- Studios: Allen Zentz Recording (Hollywood, California); The Record Plant (Los Angeles, California)
- Genres: Funk, soul
- Length: 37:32
- Label: MCA
- Producer: Rufus

Rufus chronology
| Party 'Til You're Broke (1981) | Camouflage (1981) | The Very Best of Rufus Featuring Chaka Khan (1982) |

Chaka Khan chronology
| What Cha' Gonna Do for Me (1981) | Camouflage (1981) | Echoes of an Era (1982) |

Professional ratings
Review scores
| Source | Rating |
|---|---|
| AllMusic | 3/5 stars |
| The Rolling Stone Album Guide | 1/5 stars |

Camouflage is the tenth studio album by funk band Rufus (and their sixth album featuring Chaka Khan), released on the MCA Records label in 1981. Camouflage peaked at number 15 on Billboard's R&B Albums chart and stalled at number 98 on Pop. The album includes the singles "Sharing the Love" (US R&B 8, US Pop number 91) and "Better Together" (US R&B number 66, US Dance number 56).

Following the release of Camouflage, Chaka Khan recorded her third, fourth and fifth solo albums What Cha' Gonna Do for Me (1981), Echoes of an Era (1982) and Chaka Khan (1982) and Rufus recorded their third album without Khan, Seal in Red (1983), before they reunited for one final album together later in 1983, the double live/studio set Stompin' at the Savoy – Live.

== Track listing ==
Side one
| No. | Title | Writer(s) | Length |
|---|---|---|---|
| 1. | "Better Together" | Tony Maiden, Lalomie Washburn | 3:37 |
| 2. | "Jigsaw" | Maiden, Chaka Khan | 3:54 |
| 3. | "Secret Friend" | Maiden, René Moore, Angela Winbush, Allee Willis | 3:57 |
| 4. | "Music Man (The D.J. Song)" | John Robinson, David Wolinski | 3:50 |
| 5. | "True Love" | Wolinski | 3:15 |

Side two
| No. | Title | Writer(s) | Length |
|---|---|---|---|
| 6. | "Sharing the Love" | Kevin Murphy | 3:37 |
| 7. | "Quandary" | Maiden, Khan | 4:50 |
| 8. | "Lilah" | Wolinski, Willis | 4:14 |
| 9. | "Losers in Love" | Wolinski, Danny Seraphine | 3:04 |
| 10. | "Highlight" | Bobby Watson, Moore, Winbush | 3:14 |

== Personnel ==
- Chaka Khan - vocals
- Tony Maiden - guitar, vocals
- Kevin Murphy - keyboards
- Bobby Watson - bass guitar
- David "Hawk" Wolinski - synthesizer, keyboards
- John Robinson - percussion, drums
- Angela Winbush - keyboards, background vocals
- René Moore - background vocals
- Lalomie Washburn - background vocals
- Vince Charles - steel drums
- Paulinho Da Costa - percussion
- Greg Phillinganes - keyboards
- Larry Williams - saxophone

== Production ==
- Rufus - record producers
- John VanNest - audio engineer

== Charts ==
Album

| Chart (1981) | Peak |
|---|---|
| U.S. Billboard Top LPs | 98 |
| U.S. Billboard Top Soul LPs | 15 |

Singles

| Year | Single | Peak chart positions | | |
| Year | Single | US | US R&B | US Dance |
|---|---|---|---|---|
| 1981 | "Sharing the Love" | 91 | 8 | — |
| 1982 | "Better Together" | — | 66 | 56 |
