= Chaka Khan (album) =

Studio album by Chaka Khan
- Released: November 17, 1982
- Length: 39:02
- Label: Warner Bros.
- Producer: Arif Mardin

Chaka Khan chronology
| Echoes of an Era (1982) | Chaka Khan (1982) | The Very Best of Rufus featuring Chaka Khan (1982) |

Singles from Chaka Khan
- 1. "Got to Be There" Released: October 1982; 2. "Tearin' It Up" Released: March 1983; 3. "Best in the West" Released: 1983

Chaka Khan is the fourth solo album by American singer Chaka Khan. It was released on the Warner Bros. Records label on November 17, 1982. Khan worked with frequent collaborator Arif Mardin on the album, who would produce all the tracks on Chaka Khan. The "Be Bop Medley" won the pair Grammy Award for Best Vocal Arrangement for Two or More Voices at the 26th awards ceremony.

Following the release of the Chaka Khan album and the greatest hits package The Very Best of Rufus featuring Chaka Khan, Khan reunited with the band Rufus later that year for one final album together, the double live/studio set Stompin' at the Savoy - Live (1983). Her next solo album I Feel for You followed in 1984. Despite its many accolades and artistic achievements the Chaka Khan album remained unreleased on CD in both the United States and Europe, and was only available as an import from Japan, until it was finally issued on CD in the UK in 2010 as part of a Five disc set containing Khan's first five solo albums.

== Overview ==
Two singles were released from Chaka Khan: Lead single "Got to Be There," a cover of the same-titled Michael Jackson song reached number 67 on the US Billboard Hot 100 and peaked at number five on the Hot R&B/Hip-Hop Songs chart. Follow-up "Tearin' It Up" was significantly less successful, reaching number 48 on the Hot R&B/Hip-Hop Songs chart. Warner Bros. Records released a 12" single of "Tearin' It Up" which included extended remix (7:21) as well as an instrumental version (8:07), both mixed by Larry Levan.

== Critical reception ==
Professional ratings
Review scores
| Source | Rating |
|---|---|
| AllMusic | 4.5/5 stars |
| Robert Christgau | B+ |
| Rolling Stone | 3.5/5 stars |

AllMusic editor Ron Wynn called Chaka Khan an "excellent album from Chaka Khan, mixing tingling uptempo tunes with her characteristic soaring, glorious vocals. "Got to Be There" reached number five on the R&B charts, but it actually wasn't the album's high point. That was the marvelous "Be Bop Medley," which later led hardcore jazz purist Betty Carter to proclaim Khan the one female singer working outside the jazz arena with legitimate improvising credentials." Robert Christgau wrote: "It's never dumb, and achieves the oft-promised funk-bebop fusion with some spritz. But her fans don't care that not a single song catches like, for instance, "Tell Me Something Good" or "Once You Get Started" or even "I'm Every Woman." Nonfans will. Or rather, they won't."

== Commercial performance ==
Chaka Khan debuted at number 93 on the US Billboard 200 in the week of December 18, 1982, and eventually peaked at number 52 on February 12, 1983. It album became Khan's third top five album on Billboard's Top R&B/Hip-Hop Albums chart.

== Track listing ==
All tracks produced by Arif Mardin.

Chaka Khan track listing
| No. | Title | Writer(s) | Length |
|---|---|---|---|
| 1. | "Tearin' It Up" | Bunny Sigler; Jane Lumibao | 6:39 |
| 2. | "Slow Dancin'" (featuring Rick James) | Loz Netto | 5:22 |
| 3. | "Best In The West" | Dominic BugattiFrank Musker | 4:00 |
| 4. | "Got to Be There" | Elliot Willensky | 3:50 |
| 5. | "Be Bop Medley" (Hot House"/"East Of Suez (Come On Sailor)"/"Epistrophy (I Wanna Play)"/"Yardbird Suite"/"Con Alma"/"Giant Steps") | Tadd Dameron; Lou Stein; Thelonious Sphere Monk; Charlie Parker; Dizzy Gillespie; John Coltrane | 5:22 |
| 6. | "Twisted" | Colin Campsie; George McFarlane | 4:20 |
| 7. | "So Not to Worry" | Mark McMillan | 5:00 |
| 8. | "Pass It On (A Sure Thing) (Pásalo Está Seguro)" | Lalomie Washburn; Tony Maiden | 5:04 |

== Personnel ==
Performers and musicians

- Michael Brecker – alto saxophone solo
- Robert Bonfiglio – harmonica
- Robbie Buchanan – keyboards, synthesizers
- Hiram Bullock – guitar, rhythm guitar
- Seyhun Çelik – darbuka
- Bob Christianson – synthesizers
- Steve Ferrone – drums, handclaps
- Alvin Fields – low voice
- Sammy Figueroa – percussion
- Ray Gomez – lead guitar
- Joe Henderson – tenor saxophone
- Anthony Jackson – bass
- Paul Jackson Jr. – electric guitar
- Rick James – vocals
- Chaka Khan – vocals
- Kenny Kosek – fiddle
- Will Lee – background vocals, bass
- Mark Stevens – tube voice
- Hamish Stuart – background vocals, vocal ad libs
- Dave Tofani – alto saxophone
- Lenny Underwood – electric piano
- Eric Weissberg – sitar, steel guitar, jaw harp

Technical

- Randy Brecker – musical arranger (horns)
- Robbie Buchanan – musical arranger (bass part, rhythm)
- Chaka Khan – vocal arrangement, special lyrics
- Danne Lemelle – musical arranger (horns)
- Arif Mardin – record producer, musical arranger, vocal arrangement

== Charts ==
Weekly chart performance for Chaka
| Chart (1982–83) | Peak position |
|---|---|
| US Billboard 200 | 52 |
| US Top R&B/Hip-Hop Albums (Billboard) | 5 |
