= Echoes of an Era =

Studio album by Chaka Khan et al.
- Released: January 14, 1982
- Recorded: 1981–1982
- Genre: Jazz
- Length: 55:56
- Label: Elektra/Musician
- Producer: Lenny White

Chaka Khan et al. chronology
Camouflage (1981)	Echoes of an Era (1982)	Chaka Khan (1982)

Professional ratings
Review scores
Source	Rating
AllMusic	4/5 stars
The Rolling Stone Jazz Record Guide	4/5 stars

Echoes of an Era is an album by American R&B/jazz singer Chaka Khan, Joe Henderson, Freddie Hubbard, Chick Corea, Stanley Clarke and Lenny White, released in 1982 on Elektra Records.

On Echoes of an Era, the group interprets jazz standards and songs from the Great American Songbook. The album was originally credited to Echoes of an Era, with all six performers listed on the album cover and Khan getting top billing.

The album was digitally remastered and re-released by the Warner Music Group's sublabel Rhino Entertainment in 2003. The final track of the reissue, "Spring Can Really Hang You Up the Most", included bonus audio of an interview with Chaka Khan and Freddie Hubbard in an interview lasting a little over 7 minutes.

In 2011, Corea, Clarke and White's group Return to Forever recorded "High Wire – The Aerialist" and "I Loves You Porgy" with Khan on vocals.

== Track listing ==
No.	Title	Writer(s)	Length
1.	"Them There Eyes"	Maceo Pinkard, Doris Tauber, William Tracey	3:52
2.	"All of Me"	Gerald Marks, Seymour Simons	4:35
3.	"I Mean You"	Coleman Hawkins, Thelonious Monk	3:28
4.	"I Loves You Porgy"	George Gershwin, Ira Gershwin, DuBose Heyward	6:29
5.	"Take the "A" Train"	Billy Strayhorn	6:26
6.	"I Hear Music"	Burton Lane, Frank Loesser	4:22
7.	"High Wire – The Aerialist"	Chick Corea, Tony Cohan	6:29
8.	"All of Me" (Alternate take)	Gerald Marks, Seymour Simons	4:16
9.	"Spring Can Really Hang You up the Most"	Fran Landesman, Tommy Wolf	8:24

== Personnel ==
- Chaka Khan - vocals
- Chick Corea - piano
- Stanley Clarke - acoustic bass
- Joe Henderson - tenor saxophone
- Freddie Hubbard - trumpet, flugelhorn
- Lenny White - drums

== Production ==
- Lenny White - record producer
- Bernie Kirsch - sound engineer
- Recorded at Mad Hatter Studios, Los Angeles, California.

== Chart performance ==
Year	Chart	Position
1982	Billboard Jazz Albums	11
