= Stompin' at the Savoy – Live =

1983 live album by Rufus and Chaka Khan

Live album by Rufus and Chaka Khan
- Released: August 10, 1983
- Recorded: February 12–14, 1982 (sides A, B and C)
- Venues: The Savoy, New York
- Genre: R&B
- Length: 77:41
- Label: Warner Bros.
- Producer: Russ Titelman

Rufus chronology
Seal in Red (1983)	Stompin' at the Savoy – Live (1983)

Chaka Khan chronology
The Very Best of Rufus featuring Chaka Khan (1982)	Stompin' at the Savoy – Live (1983)	I Feel for You (1984)

Professional ratings
Review scores
Source	Rating
AllMusic	3/5 stars
Record Mirror	4/5 stars

Stompin' at the Savoy – Live is an album by American R&B/funk band Rufus with singer Chaka Khan, released on the Warner Bros. Records label in 1983.

Stompin' at the Savoy was a double-record set featuring three sides of live material recorded at The Savoy in New York which sees the band reunited with Khan and performing all their biggest hits such as "Tell Me Something Good", "You Got the Love", "Sweet Thing", "At Midnight (My Love Will Lift You Up)", and "Do You Love What You Feel" as well as "What Cha' Gonna Do for Me" from Khan's 1981 solo album of the same name.

The fourth side of the album included four new studio recordings of which two were released as singles, "Ain't Nobody" and "One Million Kisses". "Ain't Nobody", written by the band's keyboardist David "Hawk" Wolinski, became Rufus' final number-one R&B hit, reached number 22 on the Billboard Hot 100 singles chart, also won them a Grammy Award for Best R&B Performance by a Duo or Group with Vocal in 1984 and has since come to be regarded as one of Khan's own signature tunes – although it in fact was recorded with Rufus. Both "Ain't Nobody" and "One Million Kisses" were included on her 1989 remix compilation Life Is a Dance – The Remix Project. Additionally, "Ain't Nobody" was featured in the movie Breakin' and its soundtrack.

The Stompin' at the Savoy – Live album which was a major commercial success, reaching number 4 on Billboard's R&B Albums Chart as well as number 50 on Pop, became Khan's final collaboration with Rufus and the band dissolved shortly after its release. Quincy Jones wrote the liner notes for the album.

== Track listing ==
Side one
No.	Title	Writer(s)	Length
1.	"You Got the Love"	Chaka Khan, Ray Parker Jr.	5:36
2.	"Once You Get Started"	Gavin Christopher	5:05
3.	"Dance Wit Me"	Gavin Christopher	3:36
4.	"Sweet Thing"	Chaka Khan, Tony Maiden	3:28

Side two
No.	Title	Writer(s)	Length
5.	"Tell Me Something Good"	Stevie Wonder	3:39
6.	"Stop on By"	Truman Thomas, Bobby Womack	5:41
7.	"Pack'd My Bags"	Chaka Khan, Tony Maiden	4:31
8.	"I'm a Woman (I'm a Backbone)"	Lalomie Washburn	4:06
9.	"At Midnight (My Love Will Lift You Up)"	Tony Maiden, Lalomie Washburn	3:39

Side three
No.	Title	Writer(s)	Length
10.	"Ain't That Peculiar"	Warren Moore, Smokey Robinson, Robert Rogers, Marvin Tarplin	3:29
11.	"Stay"	Raymond Calhoun, Chaka Khan	5:50
12.	"What Cha' Gonna Do for Me"	Ned Doheny, Hamish Stuart	4:24
13.	"Do You Love What You Feel"	David Wolinski	6:50

Side four
No.	Title	Writer(s)	Length
14.	"Ain't Nobody" (Studio recording)	David Wolinski	4:41
15.	"One Million Kisses" (Studio recording)	Kevin Murphy, Jeffrey Osborne	4:10
16.	"Try a Little Understanding" (Studio recording)	Chaka Khan, Tony Maiden	4:42
17.	"Don't Go to Strangers" (Studio recording)	Redd Evans, Arthur Kent, David Mann	4:14

== Personnel ==
- Chaka Khan – vocals

Rufus

- Tony Maiden – vocals, guitar
- Kevin Murphy – keyboards
- David "Hawk" Wolinski – keyboards
- John Robinson – drums, percussion
- Bobby Watson – bass guitar

Additional live musicians

- Lenny Castro – percussion
- David Williams – rhythm guitar
- Stephanie Spruill – additional tambourine

Background vocals

- Stephanie Spruill
- Lee Maiden
- Julia Tillman

Horn Section

- Jerry Hey – trumpet
- Ernie Watts – tenor saxophone, flute and all saxophone solos
- Larry Williams – alto saxophone, flute
- Gary Herbig – tenor saxophone, flute

Additional studio musicians

- Joe Sample – piano on "Don't go to Strangers"
- James Newton Howard – additional synthesizer
- Paulinho da Costa – percussion
- Greg Phillinganes – synthesizer bass on "Try a Little Understanding"

Horn arrangements: Jerry Hey

String and horn arrangement on "Don't Go to Strangers" by Ralph Burns

== Trivia ==
Warner Bros. also filmed the performance for a documentary and the album was to be the soundtrack, but, for unknown reasons, decided to shelve the documentary, but still release the album.

== Production ==
- Russ Titelman - record producer
- Mark Linett - engineer
- Track 1–13 recorded at the Savoy Theatre, NY

== Later samples ==
- "Ain't Nobody"
  - "I Know You Got Soul" by Eric B. & Rakim from the album Paid in Full
  - "Last Night" by Kid 'n Play from the album 2 Hype
  - "Beat Blaster" by Rodney O & Joe Cooley from the album Three the Hard Way
  - "Ain't Nobody Better" by Yo-Yo from the album Make Way for the Motherlode
  - "Ain't Nobody" by LL Cool J from the soundtrack of Beavis and Butt-Head Do America
  - "Ain't Nobody" by Faith Evans from the album Faith
  - "Rollin'" by Lil' Troy from the album Sittin' Fat Down South

== Charts ==
Album

Chart (1983)	Peak
U.S. Billboard Top LPs	50
U.S. Billboard Top Black LPs	4

Singles

Year	Single	Peak chart positions		
Year	Single	US	US R&B	US Dance
1983	"Ain't Nobody"	22	1	6
1984	"One Million Kisses"	102	37	67
