= Party 'Til You're Broke =

1981 studio album by Rufus

Studio album by Rufus
- Released: March 1981
- Recorded: 1980–1981
- Studio: Kendun Recorders (Burbank, California)
- Genre: Contemporary R&B, funk, soul
- Label: MCA
- Producer: Rufus, John Stronach

Rufus chronology
| Masterjam (1979) | Party 'Til You're Broke (1981) | Camouflage (1981) |

Professional ratings
Review scores
| Source | Rating |
|---|---|
| AllMusic | 2/5 stars |
| The New Rolling Stone Record Guide | 1/5 stars |

Party 'Til You're Broke is the ninth studio album by funk band Rufus, released on the MCA Records label in 1981. Party 'Til You're Broke which was the band's second album not to be fronted by Chaka Khan reached number 24 on Billboard's R&B Albums chart and number 73 on Pop and included the singles "Tonight We Love" (US R&B number 18, US Dance number 64) and "Hold on to a Friend" (US R&B number 56), making Party 'Til You're Broke the most successful Khan-less album from Rufus.

Following Party 'Til You're Broke and Khan's second solo album Naughty, which was released in 1980, Rufus reunited with Khan again in 1981 for the recording of Camouflage, which was to be their final full-length studio album together.

== Track listing ==
Side one
| No. | Title | Writer(s) | Length |
|---|---|---|---|
| 1. | "Tonight We Love" | David "Hawk" Wolinski | 4:29 |
| 2. | "Hold On to a Friend" | Bessie Poindexter, Lalomie Washburn | 3:13 |
| 3. | "Love Is Taking Over" | Gavin Christopher | 4:05 |
| 4. | "Secret Love" | Poindexter, David Batteau | 3:48 |
| 5. | "Party 'Til You're Broke" | Wolinski, Poindexter | 3:33 |

Side two
| No. | Title | Writer(s) | Length |
|---|---|---|---|
| 6. | "Can I Show You" | Wolinski, Danny Seraphine | 5:10 |
| 7. | "You're Made for Me" | Poindexter, Washburn | 3:30 |
| 8. | "What Is It" | Wolinski | 4:20 |
| 9. | "We Got the Way" | Bobby Watson, René Moore, Angela Winbush | 3:45 |
| 10. | "Afterwards" | Poindexter, Washburn | 3:10 |

== Personnel ==
- Tony Maiden - bass guitar, guitar, vocals
- Kevin Murphy - keyboards, vocals
- Bobby Watson - bass guitar
- David "Hawk" Wolinski - keyboards, vocals
- John Robinson - drums, keyboards, vocals

Additional

- Louis Johnson - bass on "Tonight We Love"

== Production ==
- Rufus, John Stronach - record producers

== Charts ==
Album

| Chart (1981) | Peak |
|---|---|
| U.S. Billboard Top LPs | 73 |
| U.S. Billboard Top Soul LPs | 24 |

Singles

| Year | Single | Peak chart positions | |
| Year | Single | US R&B | US Dance |
|---|---|---|---|
| 1981 | "Tonight We Love" | 18 | 64 |
| 1981 | "Hold On to a Friend" | 56 | — |
