= Naughty (Chaka Khan album) =

1980 studio album by Chaka Khan

Studio album by Chaka Khan
- Released: March 26, 1980
- Recorded: 1979–1980
- Studio: Atlantic Studios, New York City
- Genre: Funk; R&B; soul
- Length: 40:03
- Label: Warner Bros.
- Producer: Arif Mardin

Chaka Khan chronology
Masterjam (with Rufus) (1979)	Naughty (1980)	What Cha' Gonna Do for Me (1981)

Singles from Naughty
- 1. "Clouds" Released: April 9, 1980; 2. "Papillon (aka Hot Butterfly)" Released: June 18, 1980; 3. "Get Ready, Get Set" Released: September 17, 1980

Professional ratings
Review scores
Source	Rating
AllMusic	3/5 stars
Robert Christgau	B+
Rolling Stone	3/5 stars

Naughty is the second solo album by American R&B and funk singer Chaka Khan, released on Warner Bros. Records in 1980.

== Overview ==
By the early '80s Chaka Khan and producer Arif Mardin had a great working relationship that was responsible for her hit solo debut, 1979's Chaka... Naughty presents the two in a more centered working relationship... most of Naughty represents Khan in a holding pattern, without much material to accommodate her widening range. That being said, Naughty is only a few songs away from being a bona fide classic.

— Jason Elias, Allmusic

Three singles were released from Naughty: the club hit "Clouds" (penned by Ashford & Simpson, who also wrote Chaka's "I'm Every Woman"). "Clouds" features background vocals performed by a 16-year-old Whitney Houston and her mother Cissy Houston (US R&B #10), "Get Ready, Get Set" (#48) and the big hit "Papillon (a.k.a. Hot Butterfly)" (#22). The album track "Our Love's in Danger" featured prominent background vocals from Luther Vandross and Whitney Houston.

== Chart performance ==
On Billboard's charts, the album reached #6 on Black Albums, #43 on Pop Albums. Naughty garnered Khan her first American Music Award nomination for Favorite Soul/R&B Female Artist at the 8th American Music Awards in 1981.

Following the release of Naughty, Khan reunited with Rufus for the recording of 1981's Camouflage. Her third solo album, What Cha' Gonna Do for Me, followed later that same year.

== Reissue ==
Naughty finally saw a United States CD re-release in 1998 as part of the Warner Bros. Black Music Ol' Skool series.

== Legacy and impact ==
Naughty was ranked at number 65 on The 80 Greatest Albums of 1980 by Rolling Stone magazine.

== Track listing ==
No.	Title	Writer(s)	Length
1.	"Clouds"	Nickolas Ashford, Valerie Simpson	4:28
2.	"Get Ready, Get Set"	Kathy Anderson, Ellison Chase, Bill Haberman, Arthur Jacobson	3:42
3.	"Move Me No Mountain"	Jerry Ragovoy, Aaron Schroeder	4:14
4.	"Nothing's Gonna Take You Away"	Deborah Ash, Bill King	3:42
5.	"So Naughty"	Charles Fleischer, Michael Mugrage	3:56
6.	"Too Much Love"	George D. Greer, Andrew Kastner, Jeff Wilson	3:53
7.	"All Night's All Right"	Weldon Dean Parks	4:26
8.	"What You Did"	Chaka Khan, Mark Stevens	3:58
9.	"Papillon (a.k.a. Hot Butterfly)"	Gregg Diamond	4:08
10.	"Our Love's in Danger"	Nickolas Ashford, Valerie Simpson	3:36

== Personnel ==
- Chaka Khan - lead vocals, backing vocals
- Anthony Jackson - bass guitar track 1, 3, 4, 6, 7, 10
- Jeff Mironov – guitar track 1, 3, 7, 9, 10
- Hamish Stuart – guitar track 1, 2, 3, 4, 5, 6, 9
- Phil Upchurch – guitar track 7, 10
- Steve Khan – guitar track 2, 4
- Steve Ferrone - drums
- Ken Bichel – synthesizer track 2, 4, 5, 6, 8, 9
- Arthur Jenkins - percussion track 1, 2, 3, 9, 10 clavinet track 5, 6, electric piano track 7, 8
- Leon Pendarvis - piano track 1, 10 electric piano track 3, 4, 5, 6, 7 synthesizer track 4, 8
- Peter Gordon - French horn track 3, 8
- John Trevor Clark - French horn track 3, 8
- Michael Brecker - tenor saxophone track 4, 5, 7, 10
- Harvey Estrin - tenor saxophone track 9, alto saxophone track 10
- David Tofani - alto saxophone track 5
- Eddie Daniels - alto saxophone track 7, 9, tenor saxophone track 10
- Lewis Delgatto - baritone saxophone track 5, 7
- Ronnie Cuber - baritone saxophone track 9, 10
- Randy Brecker – trumpet track 5, 7, 9, 10
- Marvin Stamm – trumpet track 7
- Barry Rogers – trombone track 5, 7
- James E. Pugh – trombone track 9, 10
- Alan Shulman, Alfred Brown, Anahid Ajemian, Fred Zlotkin, Frederick Buldini, Gerald Tarack, Harold Kohon, Harry Lookofsky, Homer Mensch, Jonathan Abramowitz, Kermit Moore, Leo Kahn, Lewis Eley, Marilyn Wright, Matthew Raimondi, Mitsue Takayama, Paul Gershman, Peter Dimitriades, Richard Maximoff, Ted Hoyle - strings
- Gene Orloff – concertmaster

Track 1 “Clouds” Backing Vocals – Chaka Khan, Charlotte Crossley, Cissy Houston, Mark Stevens, Whitney Houston

Track 2 “Get Ready, Get Set” Backing Vocals – Chaka Khan, Mark Stevens Bass – Willie Weeks Electric Piano – Don Grolnick Guitar – Steve Khan Guitar, Soloist – Hiram Bullock

Track 3 "Move Me No Mountain" Backing Vocals – Chaka Khan, Cissy Houston Guitar, Sitar, Soloist – Jeff Mironov Guitar, Soloist – Phil Upchurch Tuba – Robert Stewart, David Bargeron, Howard Johnson, Joseph Daley

Track 4 “Nothing's Gonna Take You Away” Backing Vocals – Luther Vandross, Mark Stevens, Hamish Stuart Guitar – Steve Khan Percussion – Sammy Figueroa

Track 5 “So Naughty” Bass – Marcus Miller

Track 6 “Too Much Love” Bass – Mark Stevens Guitar, Soloist – Hiram Bullock Percussion – Naná Vasconcelos, Sammy Figueroa

Track 7 “All Night's All Right” Violin [Electric] – Noel Pointer

Track 8 “What You Did” Bass – Mark Stevens Guitar – Hiram Bullock Percussion – Sammy Figueroa Tuba – Robert Stewart, David Bargeron, Howard Johnson, Joseph Daley

Track 9 “Papillon (Aka Hot Butterfly)” Backing Vocals – Cissy Houston, Luther Vandross, Mark Stevens, Ullanda McCullough, Hamish Stuart Bass – Willie Weeks Harmonica, Soloist – Hugh McCracken Piano – Don Grolnick Alto Saxophone, Soloist [Alto Fill] – Eddie Daniels

Track 10 “Our Love's in Danger” Backing Vocals – Charlotte Crossley, Cissy Houston, Hamish Stuart, Luther Vandross, Mark Stevens, Whitney Houston Synthesizer – Richard Tee

== Production ==
- Arif Mardin - record producer, musical arranger (horns, strings)
- Lew Hawn - recording, mix
- Michael O'Reilly - assistant engineer
- George Marino - mastering
- Photography: Glen Wexler

== Charts ==
=== Weekly charts ===
Chart (1980)	Peak position
US Billboard 200	43
US Top R&B/Hip-Hop Albums (Billboard)	6
