= Maurice White (album) =

Studio album by Maurice White
- Released: September 1985
- Studios: Bill Schnee Studios, Hollywood Sound Recorders, Mama Jo's, Ocean Way Recording, Soundcastle
- Genres: R&B, soul
- Length: 47:18
- Label: Columbia
- Producer: Maurice White

Maurice White is the debut studio album by American singer and musician Maurice White released in September 1985 on Columbia Records. The album rose to number 12 upon the Billboard Top R&B Albums chart and No. 35 on the Dutch Album Top 100.

== Overview ==
The self titled album was produced by Maurice White. Artists such as Gerald Albright, Jeff Lorber, Ricky Lawson of Yellowjackets, Paul Jackson Jr., Martin Page, Wayne Vaughn and Wanda Vaughn of The Emotions appeared on the record. The album was also reissued in 2001 with four bonus tracks entitled "Life" (Freedom mix), "Life", "Adventures of the Heart" and "Sam the Jam".

== Singles ==
A cover of Ben E. King's "Stand by Me" got to No. 6 on the Billboard Hot Soul Songs chart, No. 11 on the Billboard Adult Contemporary Songs chart and No. 5 on the RPM Canadian Adult Contemporary Songs chart.

Another single called "I Need You" rose to No. 20 upon the Billboard Adult Contemporary Songs chart and No. 30 on the Billboard Hot Soul Songs chart.

== Critical reception ==
Professional ratings
Review scores
Source	Rating
Allmusic	4/5 stars
People	(favourable)
Popmatters	(favourable)
Chicago Tribune	(favourable)
The Guardian	(favourable)
Musician	(favourable)
Tampa Tribune	3/5 stars
Sacramento Bee	(favourable)

Robin Denselow of The Guardian called the album a "lush collection of self produced dance tracks, and the occasional ballad, with synths and drum programming immaculately in place, and the vocals as classy as ever". With a four out of five star review Andrew Hamilton of Allmusic wrote "Maurice White gives an excellent account on his solo debut". David Okamoto of the Tampa Tribune proclaimed "White offers an impressive collection of solid-state R&B that doesn't let the intricate arrangements get in the way of his warm vocals". J.D. Considine of Musician said the "Given his status as Earth, Wind & Fire's Shining Star, it comes as no surprise that White's first solo project sounds a lot like classic EW&F: tight, focused and punchy. But while White remembers to sink a hook into every verse and chorus, the emphasis here is on subtlety and sophistication as he works his way from R&B basics..with a sense of craft that makes slickness irrelevant". Simon Warner of Popmatters described the LP as "something of a lost treasure" which "distils the fervent energy of his group but offers an appealing showcase for White's confident vocal manner." David Barton of the Sacramento Bee extolled "a fine return to form for Earth, Wind & Fire's mastermind. White's solo debut features upbeat, melodic dance cuts".

== Track listing ==
=== Original release ===
Side one
No.	Title	Writer(s)	Length
1.	"Switch on Your Radio"	Brian Fairweather, Martin Page, Maurice White	4:18
2.	"Jamboree"	Keith Echols, Alice Echols, Dean Gant	3:26
3.	"Stand by Me"	Ben E. King, Jerry Leiber, Mike Stoller	4:09
4.	"Sea of Glass"	Brian Fairweather, Peter Wolf	0:43
5.	"I Need You"	William Smith, Priscilla J. Coolidge, Mary Unobsky	4:34

Side two
No.	Title	Writer(s)	Length
6.	"Believe in Magic"	Robbie Buchanan, Diane Warren, Maurice White	4:35
7.	"Lady Is Love"	Michel Colombier, Martin Page, Maurice White	5:05
8.	"Invitation"	Gerald Brown, Wanda Vaughn, Wayne Vaughn, Maurice White	3:55
9.	"The Sleeping Flame"	Martin Page, Maurice White, Peter Wolf	2:02
10.	"Children of Afrika"	Martin Page, Maurice White, Peter Wolf	4:38
11.	"Alpha Dance"	Robbie Buchanan, Diane Warren, Maurice White	1:19

=== 2001 reissue ===
No.	Title	Writer(s)	Length
1.	"Switch on Your Radio"	Brian Fairweather, Martin Page, Maurice White	4:18
2.	"Jamboree"	Keith Echols, Alice Echols, Dean Gant	3:26
3.	"Stand by Me"	Ben E. King, Jerry Leiber, Mike Stoller	4:09
4.	"Sea of Glass"	Brian Fairweather, Peter Wolf	0:43
5.	"I Need You"	Priscilla J. Coolidge, William Smith, Mary Unobsky	4:34
6.	"Believe in Magic"	Robbie Buchanan, Diane Warren, Maurice White	4:35
7.	"Lady Is Love"	Michel Colombier, Martin Page, Maurice White	5:05
8.	"Invitation"	Martin Page, Maurice White, Peter Wolf	3:55
9.	"The Sleeping Flame"	Martin Page, Maurice White, Peter Wolf	2:02
10.	"Children of Afrika"	Martin Page, Maurice White, Peter Wolf	4:38
11.	"Alpha Dance"	Robbie Buchanan, Diane Warren, Maurice White	1:19
12.	"Life" (Freedom mix)	Maurice White	0:57
13.	"Life"	Erich Bulling, Frannie Golde, Martin Page, Maurice White	3:56
14.	"Adventures of the Heart"	Brian Fairweather, Martin Page, Maurice White	2:34
15.	"Sam the Jam"	Maurice White	0:18

== Personnel ==
=== Musicians ===
- Gerald Albright - saxophone
- Gerald "Get Down" Brown - bass guitar
- Bill Bottrell - finger snapping
- Vinnie Colaiuta - drums
- Michel Colombier - keyboards
- Paulinho da Costa - percussion
- Bill Reichenbach Jr. - trombone
- Sheldon Reynolds - guitar
- Greg Phillinganes - synthesizer, soloist
- Michael Boddicker - synthesizer programming
- Robbie Buchanan - synthesizer, arrangements, keyboards, drum programming, assistant producer
- Brian Fairweather - background vocals, chants, associate producer, vocal arrangement, drum programming, vocoder, rhythm arrangements
- Dean Gant - synthesizer, arrangements, drum programming
- Rupert Greenall - synthesizer
- Donald Griffin - guitar
- Jerry Hey - trumpet
- Marva Holcolm - background vocals
- Paul Jackson, Jr. - guitar, rhythm arrangements
- Abraham Laboriel - bass guitar
- Michael Landau - guitar
- Ricky Lawson - drums
- Paul Leim - Simmons drum programming
- Jeff Lorber - synthesizer
- Marlon McClain - guitar
- Martin Page - bass guitar, arrangements, background vocals, chants, associate producer, vocal arrangement, rhythm arrangements
- John "J.R." Robinson - drums
- Julia Tillman - background vocals
- Wanda Vaughn - background vocals
- Wayne Vaughn - synthesizer, arrangements
- Maurice White - percussion, lead vocals, background vocals, kalimba, producer, chants, mixing, original recording producer, vocoder
- David Williams - guitar
- Peter Wolf - keyboards, synthesizer, drum programming, chants

=== Miscellaneous Credits ===
- Mixing: Paul Klingberg
- Mixing: Bill Bottrell
- Mixing: Eric ET Thorngren
- Art Direction: Donald Lane, Howard Fritzson
- Photography: Harry Langdon
- Make-Up: Tara Posey
- Liner Notes: Ramsey Lewis
- Tape Research: Matthew Kelly
- Packaging Manager: Mike Cimicata
- Assistant: Cameron Marcarelli
- Reissue: Leo Sacks- Liner Notes, Reissue Producer, Mixing

== Charts ==
Album
Year	Chart	Position
1985	US Billboard Top R&B/Hip-Hop Albums	12
1985	Dutch Albums (Album Top 100)	35
1985	New Zealand Albums	49
1985	US Billboard 200	61

Singles
Year	Single	Chart	Position
1985	"I Need You"	US Adult Contemporary Songs	20
1985	"I Need You"	US Hot R&B/Hip Hop Singles and Tracks	30
1985	"I Need You"	US The Billboard Hot 100	95
1985	"Stand by Me"	US Billboard Hot R&B/Hip-Hop Singles & Tracks	6
1985	"Stand by Me"	RPM Canadian Adult Contemporary Songs	5
1985	"Stand by Me"	New Zealand Singles (RIANZ)	8
1985	"Stand by Me"	US Adult Contemporary Songs	11
1985	"Stand by Me"	Dutch Singles Dutch Single Top 100	38
1985	"Stand by Me"	US Billboard Hot 100	50
1985	"Lady Is Love"	US Billboard Hot R&B/Hip-Hop Singles & Tracks	89
