= I Need You (Maurice White song) =

Single by Maurice White

from the album Maurice White
- B-side: "Believe in Magic"
- Released: 1985
- Genre: Rhythm and blues, soul
- Label: Columbia
- Songwriters: Mary Unobsky, Priscilla Coolidge, William Smith
- Producer: Maurice White

Maurice White singles chronology
"I Need You" (1985)	"Stand by Me" (1985)

" I Need You" is a song by American singer-songwriter Maurice White released in 1985 by Columbia Records. The song reached No. 20 on the Billboard Adult Contemporary chart and No. 30 on the Billboard Hot Black Singles chart.

== Overview ==
"I Need You" was produced by Maurice White and composed by Mary Unobsky, Priscilla Coolidge and William Smith.

The single's B-side was "Believe in Magic". Both "I Need You" and "Believe in Magic" came from Maurice White's 1985 self-titled album.

== Critical reception ==
People proclaimed that "the brisk ballad (I) Need You is terrific too, especially welcome for White’s stirring vocal." Simon Warner of Popmatters noted that the song has "enough lush hooks". Andrew Hamilton of Allmusic also called I Need You "a classy ballad tenderized by White's crafty read."

== Personnel ==
- Backing vocals – Julia Tillman, Marva Holcolm, Maxine Willard
- Bass – Abraham Laboriel
- Drums – John Robinson
- Guitar – Paul Jackson Jr.
- Keyboards, Synthesizer – Robbie Buchanan
- Percussion – Paulinho Da Costa
- Saxophone - [Uncredited; likely Gerald Albright, who is credited as saxophonist on other tracks from the album]
- Arranged by Robbie Buchanan
- Co-producer – Robbie Buchanan
- Producer – Maurice White
- Producer [Associate] – Brian Fairweather, Martin Page
