= Masterjam =

1979 studio album by Rufus & Chaka

Studio album by Rufus & Chaka
- Released: November 1979
- Recorded: 1979
- Genre: Smooth soul
- Length: 39:31
- Label: MCA; MCA 5103
- Producer: Quincy Jones

Rufus chronology
Numbers (1979)	Masterjam (with Chaka Khan) (1979)	Party 'Til You're Broke (1981)

Chaka Khan chronology
Chaka (1978)	Masterjam (with Rufus) (1979)	Naughty (1980)

Singles from Masterjam
- 1. "Do You Love What You Feel" Released: October 13, 1979; 2. "Any Love" Released: February 3, 1980; 3. "I'm Dancing for Your Love" Released: May 15, 1980

Professional ratings
Review scores
Source	Rating
AllMusic	4/5 stars
Christgau's Record Guide	B−
Record Mirror	3.5/5 stars
Rolling Stone	(not rated)
The Rolling Stone Album Guide	1/5 stars
Smash Hits	6/10

Masterjam is the platinum-selling eighth studio album by funk band Rufus (and their seventh album featuring singer Chaka Khan). Released in 1979, it was their debut on the MCA Records label following their purchase and dissolution of ABC Records.

== History ==
Produced by Quincy Jones, Masterjam was the band's fourth album to top Billboard's R&B Albums chart, and also reached number 14 on the Pop chart. The album includes the singles "Do You Love What You Feel", their fourth number-one hit on the R&B Singles chart and also number 30 on Pop, "Any Love" (US R&B number 24, 1980) and "I'm Dancing for Your Love" (US R&B number 43, 1980). In 1979, Chaka Khan found solo success with the release of the album, Chaka, and its parent single, "I'm Every Woman", which became her signature song years before "I Feel for You".

However, Khan was contractually obligated to remain a member of her long-standing band Rufus, a group she had joined in 1972. Since their 1973 debut, Khan had led on most of the group's songs. While Ron Stockert, an earlier member, had added vocals to the debut and their follow-up, Rags to Rufus, Stockert left after complaining of their label's focus on Khan, and Tony Maiden would begin to lead on more songs as the 1970s drew to a close, Khan's presence continued to boost the group.

For their first album with MCA Records, which had absorbed ABC Records a year before, the group enlisted Jones to help them with the record (Khan had recorded with Jones the year before for his album Sounds...and Stuff Like That!!). The group, while still with Khan, was now starting to record without her, while Khan was starting to express a view of going solo for good while still performing with the group onstage. Despite this, the album became a success upon its release. Following Masterjam Chaka Khan recorded her second solo album Naughty and Rufus Party 'Til You're Broke, released in 1980 and 1981 respectively. Khan reunited with the band again in 1981 for the recording of Camouflage.

Jones had also brought in the Seawind Horns for help, as well as the Brothers Johnson for additional percussion help. Rufus even does a funked-up cover of Jones's own "Body Heat".

== Track listing ==
Side one
No.	Title	Writer(s)	Length
1.	"Do You Love What You Feel"	Hawk Wolinski	4:27
2.	"Any Love"	Wolinski	4:50
3.	"Heaven Bound"	Bill Meyers, Billy Durham, Lorrin Bates	3:45
4.	"Walk the Rockway"	Tony Maiden	4:04

Side two
No.	Title	Writer(s)	Length
5.	"Live in Me"	Rod Temperton	3:54
6.	"Body Heat"	Quincy Jones, Bruce Fisher, Leon Ware, Stan Richardson	5:45
7.	"I'm Dancing for Your Love"	Wolinski, John Robinson, Patti Austin, Peggy Jones	4:31
8.	"What Am I Missing?"	Chaka Khan, Mark Stevens	4:03
9.	"Masterjam"	Temperton	3:34

== Personnel ==
- Chaka Khan – lead vocals, background vocals
- Tony Maiden – guitar, lead vocals, background vocals
- Kevin Murphy – keyboards
- John Robinson – drums, additional percussion, hand-clapping
- Bobby Watson – bass
- David "Hawk" Wolinski – keyboards
- Bill Reichenbach Jr., Lew McCreary – trombone
- Louis Johnson, George Johnson, Richard Heath – percussion, hand-clapping

Seawind Horns

- Jerry Hey – trumpet, flugelhorn
- Gary Grant – trumpet, flugelhorn
- Larry Hall – trumpet, flugelhorn
- Kim Hutchcroft – saxophone, flute
- Larry Williams – saxophone, flute

Production

- Quincy Jones – producer
- Bruce Swedien – audio engineer, mixing
- Jerry Hey, Bill Reichenbach Jr. – string arrangements
- Sidney Sharp – strings concertmaster
- Rufus – rhythm arrangements
- Rod Temperton – rhythm arrangements, vocal arrangements
- Chaka Khan, Tony Maiden – vocal arrangements
- Ed Caraeff – photography, album design

== Charts ==
Album

Chart (1979)	Peak
U.S. Billboard Top LPs	14
U.S. Billboard Top Soul LPs	1

Singles

Year	Single	Peak chart positions		
Year	Single	US	US R&B	US Dance
1979	"Do You Love What You Feel"	30	1	5
1980	"Any Love"	102	24	5
1980	"I'm Dancing for Your Love"	—	43	—

== Certifications ==
Region	Certification	Certified units/sales
United States (RIAA)	Gold	500,000^{^}
^{^} Shipments figures based on certification alone.

== See also ==
- List of Billboard number-one R&B albums of 1979
