= Chaka Khan =

American singer (born 1953)

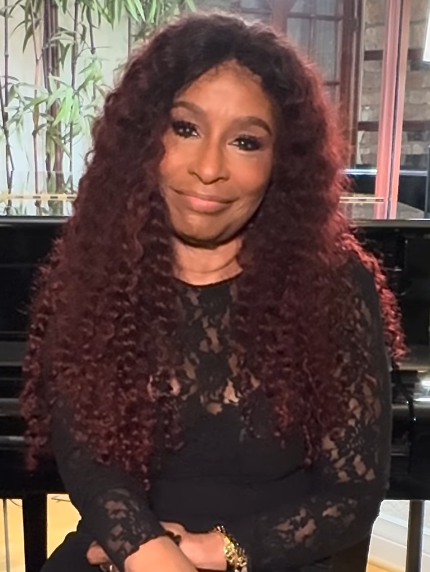
- Khan in 2025

Background information
- Also known as: Chaka Adunne Aduffe Yemoja Hodarhi Karifi Khan
- Born: Yvette Marie Stevens; March 23, 1953 (age 73); Chicago, Illinois, U.S.
- Genres: R&B; funk; pop; disco
- Occupations: Singer; songwriter
- Works: Discography
- Years active: 1970–present
- Labels: ABC; Warner Bros.; Reprise; MCA; NPG; Burgundy
- Formerly of: Rufus
- Website: chakakhan.com

Yvette Marie Stevens (born March 23, 1953), known professionally as Chaka Khan (/ˈʃɑːkə ˈkɑːn/ SHAH-kə KAHN), is an American singer and songwriter. Known as the "Queen of Funk", her career has spanned more than five decades beginning in the early 1970s as the lead vocalist of the funk band Rufus. With the band she recorded the hits "Tell Me Something Good", "Sweet Thing", "Do You Love What You Feel", and the platinum-certified "Ain't Nobody".

Her debut solo album featured the number-one R&B hit "I'm Every Woman" (which became a pop hit for Whitney Houston). Khan scored another R&B charts hit with "What Cha' Gonna Do for Me" before becoming the first R&B artist to have a crossover hit featuring a rapper, with her 1984 cover of Prince's "I Feel for You". More of Khan's hits include "Through the Fire" and a 1986 collaboration with Steve Winwood that produced a number-one hit on the Billboard Hot 100, "Higher Love".

Khan has won eleven Grammy Awards, including the Grammy Lifetime Achievement Award. With Rufus, she achieved three gold singles, one platinum single, four gold albums, and two platinum albums. In the course of her solo career, Khan achieved three gold singles, three gold albums, and one platinum album with I Feel for You. She has also worked with Whitney Houston, Ry Cooder, Robert Palmer, Ray Charles, Quincy Jones, Miles Davis, Chick Corea, Guru, Chicago, Joni Mitchell, Gladys Knight, De La Soul, Mary J. Blige, Ariana Grande, and Sia. In December 2016, Billboard magazine ranked her as the 65th most successful dance club artist of all time. She was ranked at No. 17 in VH1's original list of the 100 Greatest Women of Rock & Roll. Khan has been nominated for induction into the Rock and Roll Hall of Fame three times as a solo artist and four times as a member of Rufus featuring Chaka Khan, the first time in 2012 as a member of Rufus. In 2023, Khan was picked as an inductee in the Musical Excellence category.

== Early life ==
Yvette Marie Stevens was born on March 23, 1953, in Chicago, Illinois to Charles Stevens and Sandra Coleman; she has described her father as a beatnik who struggled with heroin addiction. She was raised in the Hyde Park area of Chicago's South Side. After her parents divorced when she was 10, her father abandoned them for over five years but returned when she was in her late teens. Speaking of her Catholic upbringing, Khan described it as “terrible” and said it was a "great relief" when she left it. Her sister, Yvonne, is a singer known as Taka Boom, while her brother Mark formed the funk group Jamaica Boys and was a member of soul group Aurra. She has two half-sisters, Zaheva and Tammy. She is a cousin to the late soul singer Lou Rawls.

Khan attributed her love of music to her grandmother, who introduced her to jazz as a child. Khan became a fan of rhythm and blues music as a preteen and when she was 11 years old she formed a girl group, the Crystalettes, which included her sister Taka. In the late 1960s, Khan attended several civil rights rallies with her father's second wife, Connie, a strong supporter of the movement. She joined the Black Panther Party after befriending a fellow member, activist and Chicago native Fred Hampton in 1967. At the age of 13, she was given the name Chaka Adunne Aduffe Hodarhi Karifi by a Yoruba Babalawo priest during a naming ceremony. Chaka means "woman of fire."

In 1969, at age 16, Khan ran away from home after her mother slammed her up against a wall. When discussing the incident, Khan stated, "She had me up against a wall by my neck. My feet touched air." She left the Panthers and dropped out of high school, having attended Calumet High School and Kenwood High School (now Kenwood Academy). She began to perform in small groups around the Chicago area, first performing with Cash McCall's group Lyfe, which included her then-boyfriend Hassan Khan. Chaka and Hassan married in 1970.

Khan was asked to replace Baby Huey of Baby Huey & the Babysitters after Huey's death in 1970. The group disbanded a year later. While performing in local bands in 1972, Khan was spotted by two members of a new group called Rufus; the lead singer Paulette McWilliams, decided to leave the band and suggested to Khan that she join. The group caught the attention of musician Ike Turner, who flew them out to Los Angeles to record at his studio Bolic Sound in Inglewood, California. Turner wanted Khan to become an Ikette; she declined, stating that she was "really happy with Rufus. But Ike's attention was certainly a boost."

== Career ==
=== 1973–1977: Early career with Rufus ===
In 1973, Rufus signed with ABC Records and released their eponymous debut album. Despite their fiery rendition of Stevie Wonder's "Maybe Your Baby" from Wonder's acclaimed Talking Book and the modest success of the Chaka-led ballad "Whoever's Thrilling You (Is Killing Me)", the album failed to gain attention. That changed when Wonder himself collaborated with the group on a song he had written for Khan. That song, "Tell Me Something Good", became the group's breakthrough hit, reaching No. 3 on the Billboard Hot 100 in 1974, later winning the group their first Grammy Award. The single's success and the subsequent follow-up, "You Got the Love", which peaked at No. 11 on the Billboard Hot 100 and No. 1 on the R&B chart, helped their second parent album, Rags to Rufus, go platinum, selling over a million copies. From 1974 to 1979, Rufus released six platinum-selling albums including Rufusized, Rufus featuring Chaka Khan, Ask Rufus, Street Player and Masterjam. Hits the group scored during this time included "Once You Get Started", "Sweet Thing", "Hollywood", "At Midnight (My Love Will Lift You Up)", and "Do You Love What You Feel".

The band gained a reputation as a live performing act, with Khan becoming the star attraction, thanks to her powerful vocals and stage attire—which sometimes included Native American garb and showing her midriff. Most of the band's material was written and produced by the band itself with few exceptions. Khan has also been noted for being an instrumentalist playing drums and bass; she also provided percussion during her tenure with Rufus. Most of her compositions were collaborations with guitarist Tony Maiden. Relations between Khan and the group, particularly between her and drummer Andre Fischer, became stormy. Several members left with nearly every release. While Khan remained in the group, she signed a solo contract with Warner Bros. Records in 1978. While Khan was busy at work on solo material, Rufus released three albums without her participation, including 1979's Numbers, 1980's Party 'Til You're Broke, and 1983's Seal in Red. Outside of her work with Rufus, Khan provided backing vocals on singer-songwriter Stephen Bishop's first album, Careless (1976), on the tracks "Little Italy", "Save It for a Rainy Day" and "Never Letting Go".

=== 1978–1983: Early solo career and final years with Rufus ===
In 1978, Warner Bros. Records released Khan's solo debut album, which featured the crossover disco hit, "I'm Every Woman", written for her by singers-songwriters Ashford & Simpson. The success of the single helped the album go platinum, selling over a million copies. Khan also featured on Quincy Jones's hit "Stuff Like That", also released in 1978, which also featured Ashford & Simpson as co-writers, along with Jones and several others. Ashford & Simpson performed with Khan on the song.

In 1979, Khan reunited with Rufus to collaborate on the Jones-produced Masterjam, which featured their hit "Do You Love What You Feel", which Khan sang with Tony Maiden. Despite her sometimes-acrimonious relationship with some of her bandmates, Khan and Maiden have maintained a friendship over the years. In 1979 she also dueted with Ry Cooder on his album Bop Till You Drop. That year, she spent time working on her producing and writing skills at Ike Turner's Bolic Sound studio. They had planned to record together. In 1980, while Rufus released Party 'Til You're Broke, again without Khan, she released her second solo album, Naughty, which featured her on the cover with her six-year-old daughter Milini. The album yielded the disco hit "Clouds" and the R&B ballad "Papillon".

Also in 1980, Khan had a cameo appearance as a church choir soloist in The Blues Brothers starring John Belushi and Dan Aykroyd. Khan released two albums in 1981, the Rufus release, Camouflage and the solo album What Cha' Gonna Do for Me. The latter album went gold. The same year, Khan appeared on three tracks on Rick Wakeman's concept album 1984. In 1982, Khan issued two more solo albums, the jazz standard Echoes of an Era with Chick Corea, Stanley Clarke and Lenny White and a more funk/pop-oriented self-titled album Chaka Khan. The latter album's track, the jazz-inflected "Be Bop Medley", won Khan a Grammy and earned praise from jazz singer Betty Carter who loved Khan's vocal scatting in the song.

In 1983, following the release of Rufus's final studio album, Seal in Red, which did not feature Khan, the singer returned with Rufus on a live album, Stompin' at the Savoy – Live, which featured the studio single "Ain't Nobody", which became the group's final charting success, reaching No. 22 on the Billboard Hot 100 and number one on the Hot R&B chart, while also reaching the top ten in the United Kingdom. Following this release, Rufus separated for good.

=== 1984–1997: Solo success ===
In 1984, Khan released her sixth studio album, I Feel for You. The title track, the first single released, was originally written and recorded by Prince in 1979 and had also been recorded by The Pointer Sisters and Rebbie Jackson. Khan's version featured a harmonica solo by Stevie Wonder and an introductory rap by Grandmaster Melle Mel. It became a million-selling smash in the U.S. and United Kingdom and helped to relaunch Khan's career. "I Feel for You" topped not only the U.S. R&B and dance charts, but achieved great success on the U.S. pop chart and reached No. 1 in the U.K. The song reached No. 3 on the Billboard Hot 100 in December 1984 and remained on that chart for 26 weeks, well into 1985. Additionally, it reached No. 1 on the Cash Box chart. It was listed as Billboard's No. 5 song for 1985 and netted Prince the 1985 Grammy Award for Best R&B Song. In addition to the song's successful radio airplay and sales, a music video of Khan with breakdancers in an inner-city setting enjoyed heavy rotation on television and helped to solidify Khan's visibility in popular culture.

Other singles that helped the I Feel For You album go platinum included "This is My Night" and the ballad "Through the Fire", the latter of which was also successful on the adult contemporary chart. Khan was featured in Steve Winwood's 1986 number-one hit, "Higher Love". That same year, a duet was planned with Robert Palmer for the song "Addicted To Love". However, her manager declined to release the duet, citing the desire not to have too much product from her in the marketplace at one time. She was still credited for the vocal arrangements in the album's liner notes, and the song became an international hit. Khan followed up the success of the I Feel For You album with 1986's Destiny and 1988's CK. Khan found more success in the late 1980s with a remix album, Life Is a Dance: The Remix Project, which reached the top ten on the British albums chart. As a result, she performed regularly in the U.K., where she maintained a strong fan base. In 1986, Khan sang alongside Luther Vandross, Cissy Houston and others on David Bowie's single "Underground" from the movie Labyrinth (1986).

In 1990, she was a featured performer on another major hit when she collaborated with Ray Charles and Quincy Jones on a new jack swing cover of The Brothers Johnson's "I'll Be Good to You", which was featured on Jones's Back on the Block. The song reached No. 18 on the Billboard Hot 100 and No. 1 on the R&B chart, later winning her and Ray Charles a Grammy for Best R&B Vocal Performance By a Duo or Group. Khan returned with her first studio album in four years in 1992 with the release of The Woman I Am, which was a success due to the R&B songs "Love You All My Lifetime" and "You Can Make the Story Right". Around this time, Khan also did a duet with Peter Cetera on the song "Feels Like Heaven", which was a minor success.

Khan also contributed to soundtracks and worked on a follow-up to The Woman I Am she titled Dare You to Love Me, which was eventually shelved. In 1995, she and rapper Guru had a hit with the duet "Watch What You Say", in the U.K. That same year, she provided a contemporary R&B cover of the classic standard, "My Funny Valentine", for the Waiting to Exhale soundtrack. In 1996, following the release of her greatest-hits album, Epiphany: The Best of Chaka Khan, Vol. 1, Khan abruptly left Warner Bros. after stating the label had neglected her and failed to release Dare You to Love Me.

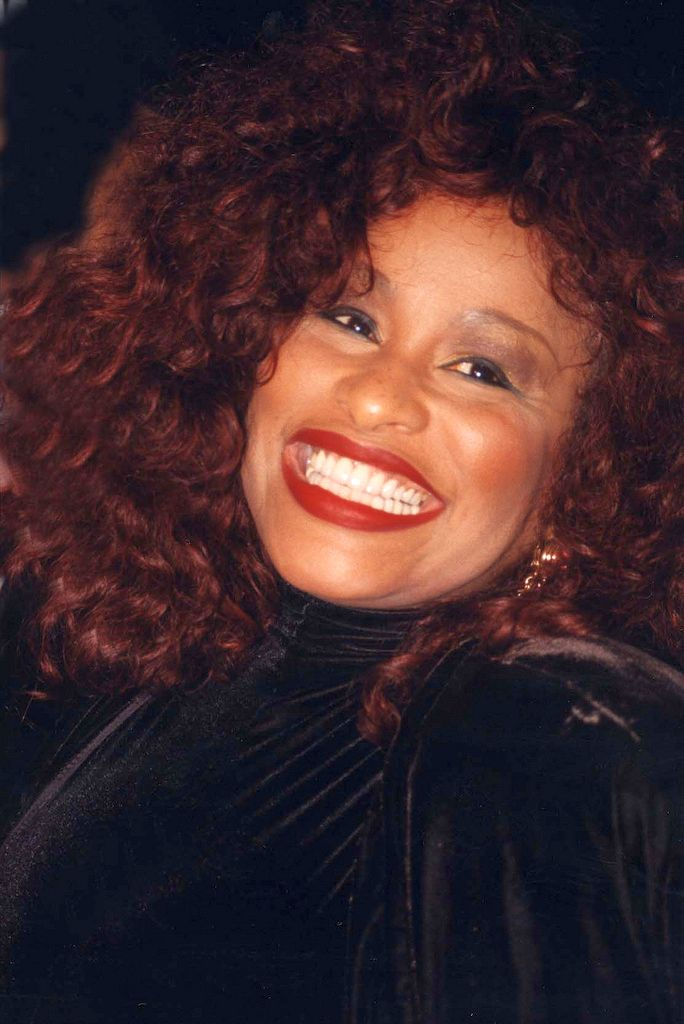
Khan in 1997

=== 1998–2017: NPG Records, Funk This, and industry honors ===
In 1998, Khan signed a contract with Prince's NPG Records label and issued Come 2 My House, followed by the single "Don't Talk 2 Strangers", a cover of a 1996 Prince song. She later went on a tour with Prince as a co-headlining act. In 2000, Khan departed NPG and she released her autobiography Chaka! Through The Fire in 2003. The following year she released her first jazz covers album in twenty-two years with 2004's ClassiKhan. She also covered "Little Wing" with Kenny Olson on the album Power of Soul: A Tribute to Jimi Hendrix.

In 2006, Khan was a featured vocalist on Arif Mardin's All My Friends Are Here album of his life's work, also appearing in the companion documentary The Greatest Ears In Town. She performed a jazz vocal for "So Blue", composed by Mardin in the '60s with lyrics written for the project by Roxanne Seeman.

After signing with Burgundy Records, Khan released what many critics called a "comeback album" with Funk This, produced by Jimmy Jam and Terry Lewis & Big Jim Wright. The album featured the hit, "Angel", and the Mary J. Blige duet, "Disrespectful". The latter track went to No. 1 on the U.S. dance singles chart, winning the singers a Grammy Award, while Funk This also won a Grammy for Best R&B Album. The album was also notable for Khan's covers of Dee Dee Warwick's "Foolish Fool" and Prince's "Sign o' the Times". In 2008, Khan participated in the Broadway adaptation of The Color Purple playing Ms. Sofia to Fantasia Barrino's Celie.

In 2002, Chaka Khan provided backing vocals for her sister Taka Boom's rendition of "Misti Blu," a collaboration with the British electronic music group amillionsons. In December 2004, Khan was awarded an Honorary Doctorate of Music from Berklee College of Music during the inauguration of its president, Roger H. Brown.

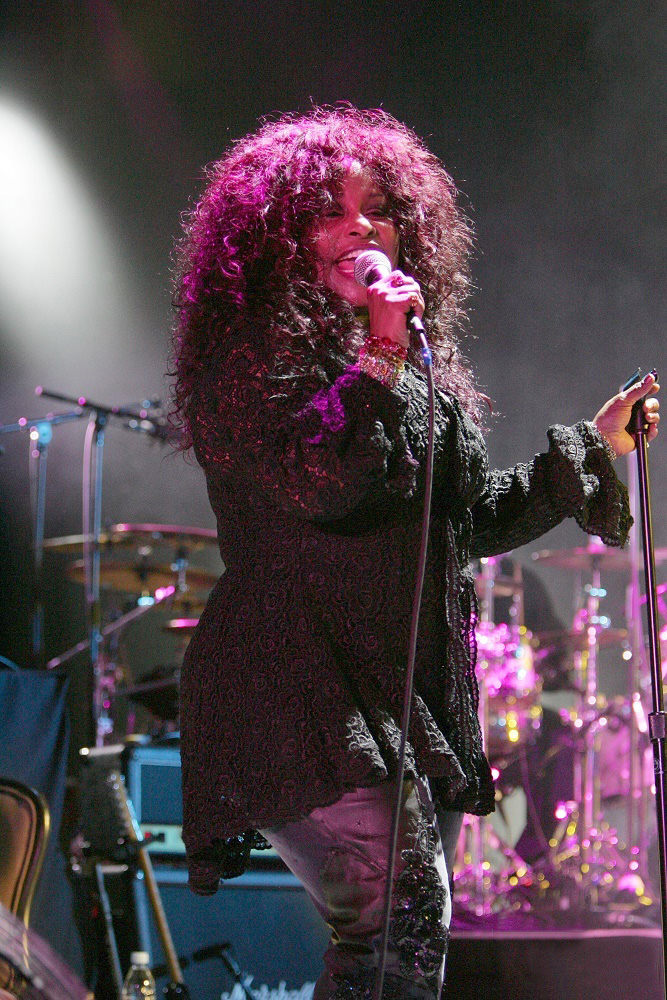
Khan performing in 2006

In a 2008 interview Khan said that she, unlike other artists, felt very optimistic about the current changes in the recording industry, including music downloading. "I'm glad things are shifting and artists – not labels – are having more control over their art. My previous big record company (Warner Bros.) has vaults of my recordings that haven't seen the light of day that people need to hear. This includes Robert Palmer's original recording of 'Addicted to Love' – which they took my vocals off of! We are working on getting it (and other tracks) all back now." In 2009, Khan hit the road with singers Anastacia and Lulu for Here Come the Girls.

In 2009, Khan was guest singer on the song "Alive" on jazz drummer Billy Cobham's album Drum ' n voice 3. In 2010, she contributed to vocals for Beverley Knight's "Soul Survivor", collaborated with Clay Aiken on a song for the kids show Phineas and Ferb, and appeared as a featured artist on "One More Try" and a cover of her song "Through the Fire" on Japanese-American singer-songwriter Ai's eighth studio album, The Last Ai. Both Khan and Ai won the International Collaboration Special Award at the 2010 Billboard Japan Music Awards for the two songs. Khan continues to perform to packed audiences both in her native United States and overseas.

On May 19, 2011, Khan was given the 2,440th Hollywood Walk of Fame star plaque on a section of Hollywood Boulevard in Los Angeles. Her family was present when the singer accepted the honor, as was Stevie Wonder, who had written her breakout hit "Tell Me Something Good". On September 27, 2011, the Rock & Roll Hall of Fame committee announced that Khan and her former band Rufus were jointly nominated for induction to the hall. It was the collective's first nomination 13 years after they were first eligible. The group were nominated partly due to Khan's own storied reputation, including her own solo career in conjunction with her years with Rufus. Recently, Khan rerecorded her song "Super Life" under the title "Super Life: Fear Kills, Love Heals" with Eric Benet, Kelly Price, and Luke James in tribute to Trayvon Martin, a teenager who was killed on February 26, 2012. A number of celebrities also joined in the recording including Loretta Devine, Terry Crews, Eva Pigford, and reporter Kevin Frazier.

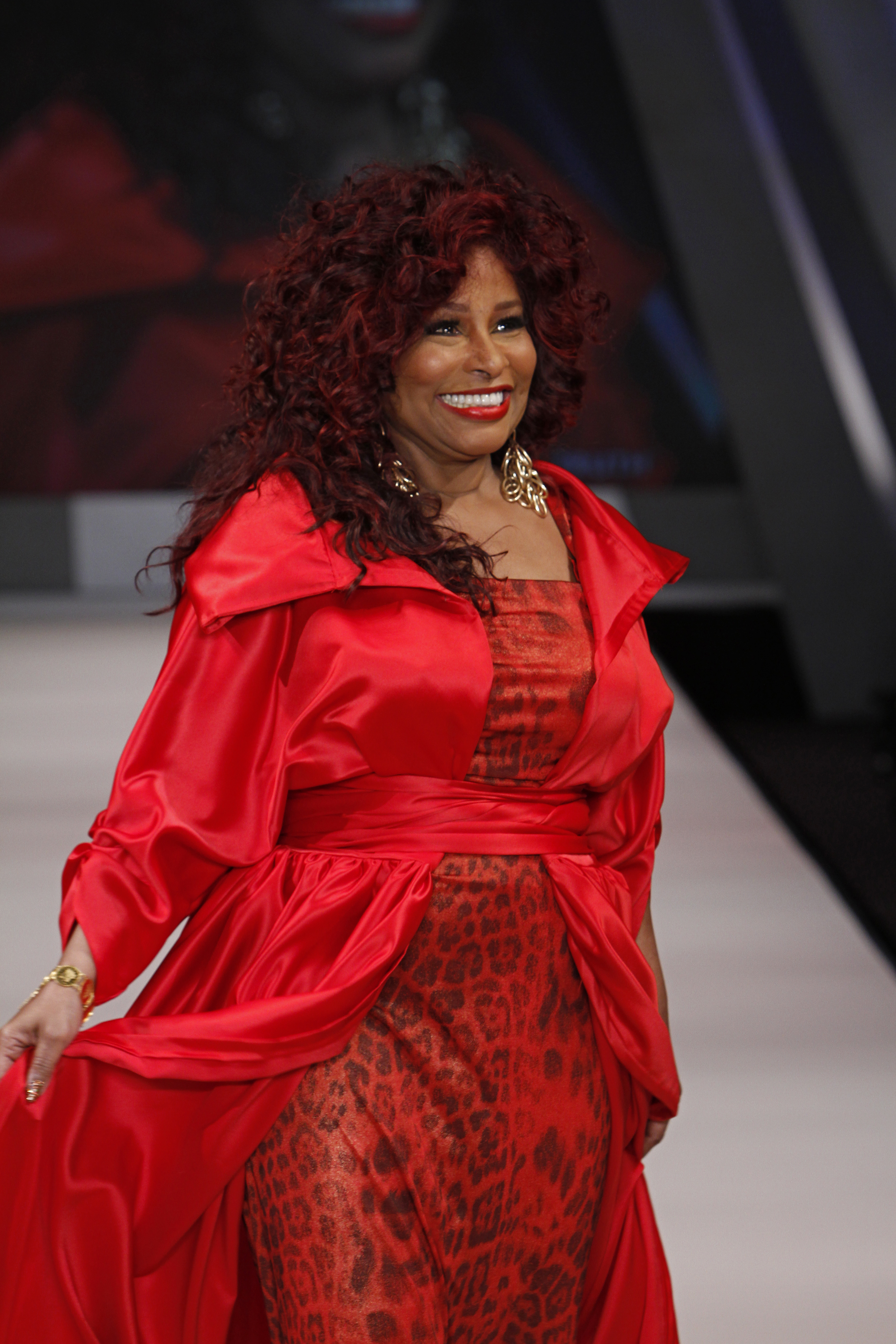
Khan in 2012

On December 6, 2012, Khan performed at a benefit for the Israeli Defense Forces (IDF). The IDF originally invited Stevie Wonder; however, after a successful lobbying campaign by the US Campaign to End the Israeli Occupation, Wonder withdrew and was replaced by Khan, who was able to raise $14 million for the IDF. This support contrasted with her earlier support for the Black Panther Party that publicly supported Palestine.

On July 27, 2013, Khan was honored 40 years after signing her first recording contract with a ceremonial renaming of Blackstone Avenue between 50th and 51st street (where her former high school, Kenwood Academy, sits) as Chaka Khan Way and on July 28 the city declared the day Chaka Khan Day. She performed at Millennium Park's Pritzker Pavilion on the 28th. In August 2014, Khan served as grand marshal at the 85th annual Bud Billiken Parade and Picnic in her hometown of Chicago.

On August 27, 2015, Khan was announced as one of the celebrities who would compete on season 21 of Dancing with the Stars. She was paired with professional dancer Keo Motsepe. Khan and Motsepe were the first couple eliminated from the competition on September 21, 2015. In July 2016, she canceled her upcoming concert performances and entered rehab.

=== 2018–present: Hello Happiness and Chakzilla ===
In June 2018, she released a new single called "Like Sugar," a collaboration with Major Lazer member Switch. She later went on to promote the single on the Ellen show. "Like Sugar" is included on her 2019 album Hello Happiness. The album was released on February 15, 2019, and is her first album in twelve years. Khan served as grand marshal in the 2019 Pasadena Tournament of Roses Parade on January 1, 2019, in Pasadena, California.

In October 2019, Khan was an honoree at Variety's "Power of Women" luncheon for supporting Little Kids Rock. Other honorees were Mariah Carey, Jennifer Aniston, Brie Larson, Awkwafina, and Dana Walden. In November 2019, Khan collaborated with Ariana Grande on the song "Nobody" from the soundtrack Charlie's Angels.

In 2020, Khan competed in season three of The Masked Singer as "Miss Monster." She was eliminated and unmasked in the third episode. Khan was invited to sing the National Anthem at the 2020 NBA All-Star Game. Her rendition was heavily criticized on Twitter, drawing comparisons to Fergie's rendition in 2018.

In May 2021, Khan appeared in the season 19 American Idol finale, where she performed a medley of her hits alongside the contestants. In June 2021, Khan joined YouTuber and performer Todrick Hall on his album Femuline for the song "Fabulosity". In November 2021, Khan participated in a Verzuz battle with singer Stephanie Mills, at which both singers performed hits from their discography. Khan released the single "Woman Like Me" on July 29, 2022.

In 2023, Rolling Stone ranked Khan at No. 29 on their list of the 200 Greatest Singers of All Time. In the same year, she was honored with induction into the Rock & Roll Hall of Fame, receiving the Musical Excellence Award. The ceremony featured performances by Khan alongside artists such as Jazmine Sullivan, Common, Sia, and H.E.R. Additionally, Khan performed "I'm Every Woman" with Sia during the induction ceremony.

In 2024, Khan collaborated with her sister, Taka Boom, and their brother, Mark Stevens, on the single "Misti Blu Two." This track, released by the British electronic music group amillionsons, is a reimagined version of Taka Boom's earlier rendition of "Misti Blu."

In 2026, I'm Every Woman – The Chaka Khan Musical, a jukebox musical about the singer's life featuring her music, premiered on the West End at the Hackney Empire, before embarking on a two-city tour and returning to London the same summer the Troubadour Wembley Park Theatre, all starring Alexandra Burke as Khan. In August 2026, she was the guest for UK BBC Radio 4's Desert Island Discs, where her musical choices included Led Zeppelin's "What Is and What Should Never Be" and Joni Mitchell's "California". Khan released her thirteenth studio album, Chakzilla, on September 18, 2026.

== Personal life ==
Khan has been married twice and has two children, daughter Indira Milini and son Damien Holland. Her first marriage was to Hassan Khan, in 1970, when she was 17, and ended in divorce a short time later. Milini's birth was the result of a relationship between Chaka Khan and Rahsaan Morris.

Khan married her second husband, Richard Holland, in 1976. The marriage reportedly caused a rift between Khan and several members of Rufus, in particular drummer Andre Fischer. Holland wanted her to tone down her sexy stage image, but she refused. Following their split in 1979, Khan spent time in the studio with Ike Turner, who she said was a "real inspiration and a catalyst emotionally and in other ways as well" during that difficult time. Holland filed for divorce in 1980, citing "irreconcilable differences."

During her solo stardom in the mid-1980s, she dated a Chicago-area schoolteacher. Following their separation, Khan moved to Europe, first settling in London, and later buying a residence in Germany. She lived in Germany for a while "in a little village in the Rhine Valley" and also in Mannheim.

Khan defines herself as spiritual and does not belong to any religious organization. She has heavily criticized her Catholic upbringing and describes it as a "negative" religion. She stated: "I had a heavy Catholic upbringing and Catholicism is terrible—it's the reason there were slaves. Mass every morning at seven o'clock during Lent. Shit. It was a great relief when I finally realized what I was into and got out of it." Khan performed at both the 2000 Democratic and Republican conventions, but describes herself as more of a "Democratic-minded person".

Khan is plant-based, saying she adopted the diet to lose weight and combat high blood pressure and Type-2 diabetes. Khan has struggled with drug abuse and alcoholism, having abused cocaine, heroin, prescription medication, and alcohol. Her drug use ended in 1999 in her late 40s. In 2016, she and her sister entered rehab for dependency to prescription medication which she initially took for an injury. She also had an on-and-off struggle with alcoholism until 2005, declaring herself sober.

In 2004, Khan's son Damien Holland, then 25, was arrested and charged with murder after he shot 17-year-old Christopher Bailey with an M16 assault rifle. The two had been arguing during a party at Khan's home, where Holland lived with his girlfriend and daughter. Khan testified on her son's behalf. Holland claimed the shooting was an accident. He was acquitted in the criminal trial but found liable in a civil suit.

Khan was featured in a 2013 episode of Celebrity Ghost Stories, in which she told the story of a shadow man who followed her on tour for years, until she met a guardian angel who admonished her to change her life or die. Khan was inducted as an honorary member of Zeta Phi Beta sorority in November 2020.

== Awards and nominations ==
=== American Music Awards ===
The American Music Awards are awarded annually. Khan has received 4 nominations.

Year	Award	Nominated work	Result
1981	Favorite Soul/R&B Female Artist	Herself	Nominated
1982	Favorite Soul/R&B Female Artist	Herself	Nominated
1985	Favorite Soul/R&B Female Artist	Herself	Nominated
1985	Favorite Soul/R&B Female Video Artist	Herself	Nominated

=== BET Awards ===
The BET Awards are awarded annually by the Black Entertainment Television network. Khan has received 1 honorary award and 1 nomination.

Year	Award	Nominated work	Result
2006	Lifetime Achievement	Herself	Honored
2008	Centric Award	Herself	Nominated

=== Grammy Awards ===
To date, Khan has received 11 Grammy Awards, including 2 as a member of Rufus and 1 Lifetime Achievement award. She has received 22 Grammy Award nominations, including three as a member of Rufus.

Year	Award	Nominated work	Result
1975	Best R&B Vocal Performance by a Duo, Group Or Chorus	"Tell Me Something Good" (as Rufus)	Won
1978	Best R&B Vocal Performance by a Duo, Group Or Chorus	Ask Rufus (as Rufus)	Nominated
1979	Best R&B Vocal Performance, Female	"I'm Every Woman"	Nominated
1982	Best R&B Vocal Performance, Female	What Cha' Gonna Do for Me	Nominated
1983	Best Jazz Vocal Performance, Female	Echoes of an Era	Nominated
1984	Best R&B Vocal Performance, Female	Chaka Khan	Won
1984	Best R&B Performance by a Duo Or Group With Vocal	"Ain't Nobody" (as Rufus)	Won
1984	Best Vocal Arrangement For Two Or More Voices	"Be Bop Medley" (with Arif Mardin)	Won
1985	Best R&B Vocal Performance, Female	"I Feel for You"	Won
1986	Best R&B Vocal Performance, Female	I Feel For You	Nominated
1987	Best R&B Vocal Performance, Female	Destiny	Nominated
1991	Best R&B Performance by a Duo Or Group With Vocal	"I'll Be Good to You" (with Ray Charles)	Won
1993	Best R&B Vocal Performance, Female	The Woman I Am	Won
1996	Best Song Written Specifically for a Motion Picture Or Television	"Love Me Still" (with Bruce Hornsby)	Nominated
1997	Best Pop Collaboration With Vocals	"Missing You" (with Brandy, Tamia & Gladys Knight)	Nominated
1997	Best R&B Performance by a Duo Or Group With Vocal	"Never Miss The Water" (with Meshell Ndegeocello)	Nominated
1997	Best R&B Performance by a Duo Or Group With Vocal	"Stomp" (with Luke Cresswell, Fiona Wilkes, Carl Smith, Fraser Morrison, Everett Bradley, Mr. X, Melle Mel, Coolio, Yo-Yo, Charlie Wilson, Shaquille O'Neal & Luniz)	Nominated
1998	Best Female R&B Vocal Performance	"Summertime"	Nominated
2003	Best Traditional R&B Vocal Performance	"What's Going On" (with The Funk Brothers)	Won
2007	Best R&B Performance by a Duo or Group With Vocals	"Everyday (Family Reunion)" (with Gerald Levert, Yolanda Adams & Carl Thomas)	Nominated
2008	Best R&B Performance by a Duo or Group With Vocals	"Disrespectful" (with Mary J. Blige)	Won
2008	Best R&B Album	Funk This	Won
2026	Grammy Lifetime Achievement Award	Herself	Honored

=== Soul Train Awards ===
The Soul Train Music Awards are awarded annually. Khan has received 2 nominations and 2 honorary awards.

Year	Award	Nominated work	Result
Soul Train Music Awards
2009	Legend Award	Herself	Honored
2013	Best Traditional Jazz Artist/Group	"Baby, It's Cold Outside" (with Jeffrey Osborne)	Nominated
2022	Soul Train Certified Award	Herself	Nominated
Soul Train Lady of Soul Awards
1998	Lena Horne Award for Outstanding Career Achievement	Herself	Honored

=== Miscellaneous awards and honors ===
Year	Organization	Award	Nominated work	Result
2002	MOBO Awards	Lifetime Achievement Award	Herself	Honored
2010	Billboard Japan Music Awards	International Collaboration Special Award	"One More Try", "Through the Fire" (with Ai)	Won
2011	United Negro College Fund Award	UNCF Award of Excellence	Herself	Honored
2011	Hollywood Walk of Fame	Star At 6623 Hollywood Blvd.	Herself	Inducted
2012	SoulMusic.com	SoulMusic Hall of Fame	Herself	Inducted
2018	UK Music Video Awards	Best Color Grading in a Video	"Like Sugar"	Won
2018	UK Music Video Awards	Best Editing	"Like Sugar"	Won
2023	Rock and Roll Hall of Fame	Musical Excellence Award	Herself	Inducted
2026	Soul Train Music Awards	Classic Soul Honor	Herself	Honored

== Discography ==
Studio albums

- Chaka (1978)
- Naughty (1980)
- What Cha' Gonna Do for Me (1981)
- Chaka Khan (1982)
- Echoes of an Era (1982)
- I Feel for You (1984)
- Destiny (1986)
- ck (1988)
- The Woman I Am (1992)
- Come 2 My House (1998)
- ClassiKhan (2004)
- Funk This (2007)
- Hello Happiness (2019)
- Chakzilla (2026)

== Filmography ==
=== Films ===
Year	Title	Notes
1980	The Blues Brothers	Choir soloist
2002	Globehunters	Marla (voice)
2010	The Greatest Ears in Town: The Arif Mardin Story	Herself
2018	Revival!	Herodias
2020	The One and Only Ivan	Henrietta (voice)
2024	Cupid Christmas	Beatrice Jefferson

=== Television ===
Year	Title	Notes
1986	Hunter	Gina Vee, Season 3, Episode 10
1997	Living Single	Herself, Season 5, Episode 6, "Up the Ladder Through the Roof"
1997	The Good News	Herself, Season 1 , Episode 9, "Show Me the Money: Part 1"
1999	Malcolm & Eddie	Rosalyn, Season 4, Episode 9, "Fairly Decent Proposal"
2004	Method & Red	Herself, Season 1, Episode 3, "Well Well Well"
2006-2007	Sheira & Loli's Dittydoodle Works	Mother Nature, Season 1, Episode 15 "Four Leaf Clover"; Season 2, Episode 13, "Betty the Rose"
2010	RuPaul's Drag U	Guest judge, Season 1, Episode 8, "A Star Is Born Again"
2010	Phineas and Ferb	Herself (voice), Season 2, Episodes 37-38
2019	Empire	Herself, Season 5, Episode 16
2020	RuPaul's Drag Race	Guest Judge, Season 12, Episode 8, "Droop"
2020	The Masked Singer	Contestant as Miss Monster, Season 3, 16th place
2021	American Idol	Finale guest singer
2022	Women Who Rock	Herself

== See also ==
- Rufus discography
