= Numbers (Rufus album) =

Studio album by Rufus
- Released: January 1979
- Studio: Dawnbreaker (San Fernando)
- Genre: Funk, soul
- Length: 40:32
- Label: ABC
- Producer: Rufus, Roy Halee

Rufus chronology
Street Player (1978)	Numbers (1979)	Masterjam (1979)

Professional ratings
Review scores
Source	Rating
AllMusic	2/5 stars
The New Rolling Stone Record Guide	1/5 stars

Numbers is the seventh studio album by funk band Rufus, released on the ABC Records label in 1979. It was the band's first album without Chaka Khan on lead vocals. Instead, band members Tony Maiden and David "Hawk" Wolinski shared lead vocal duties, with additional female leads by Helen Lowe and Maxayne. The album reached #15 on Billboard's R&B Albums chart, #81 on Pop and included the single release "Keep It Together (Declaration of Love)" (US R&B #16).

Khan returned to the band for the recording of the following album Masterjam, produced by Quincy Jones.

Numbers would be Rufus' final album on ABC Records. The label would be purchased and subsequently dissolved by MCA Records, and the band transferred to its roster.

Numbers also marked the debut of drummer John "J.R." Robinson to the lineup. He would remain Rufus's drummer for the rest of their run.

== Track listing ==
Side one
No.	Title	Writer(s)	Length
1.	"Ain't Nobody Like You"	Tony Maiden, Elainea Robbins	4:28
2.	"You're to Blame"	David "Hawk" Wolinski	3:51
3.	"Keep It Together (Declaration of Love)"	Allen Toussaint	4:16
4.	"Dancin' Mood"	Wolinski	3:52
5.	"Red Hot Poker"	Bobby Watson	4:30

Side two
No.	Title	Writer(s)	Length
6.	"Don't You Sit Alone"	Wolinski	4:41
7.	"Bet My Dreams"	Wolinski	5:04
8.	"Pleasure Dome"	Maiden, Robbins	4:11
9.	"Are We?"	Wolinski	3:32
10.	"Life in the City"	Watson	4:54

== Personnel ==
- Tony Maiden – guitar, lead vocals on "Ain't Nobody Like You", "Keep It Together (Declaration of Love)", "Bet My Dreams", "Pleasure Dome", and "Life in the City", background vocals, clavinet
- Kevin Murphy – keyboards
- Bobby Watson – bass, guitar, clavinet
- John Robinson – drums, percussion
- David "Hawk" Wolinski – keyboards, lead vocals on "You're to Blame", "Don't You Sit Alone" and "Are We?", background vocals, guitar
- Rufus – lead vocals on "Dancin' Mood"
- Everett Bryson – percussion
- Richard Mikuls – guitar
- Truman Thomas – piano on "Keep It Together (Declaration of Love)"
- Chuck "The German" Brooke – tenor saxophone, flute
- John "Iron Lips" Erwin – trombone
- Bob "The Professor" Greve – baritone saxophone, flute
- Dave Grover – trumpet, slide trumpet, trombone
- Bill Lamb – trumpet, slide trumpet, trombone, bass trombone
- Helen Lowe – lead vocals on "Ain't Nobody Like You", background vocals
- Lalomie Washburn – background vocals
- Maxayne – lead vocals on "Are We?", background vocals
- Freddie Hubbard – trumpet on "Bet My Dreams"
- Harvey Mason – drums on "Pleasure Dome"

== Production ==
- Rufus – producer, mixing
- Roy Halee – producer, engineer, mixing
- Thom Wilson – engineer
- Allen Zentz – audio mastering
- Ernie Freeman – string arrangements and conductor

== Charts ==
Album

Chart (1979)	Peak
U.S. Billboard Top LPs	81
U.S. Billboard Top Soul LPs	15

Singles

Year	Single	Peak chart positions	
Year	Single	US	US R&B
1979	"Keep It Together (Declaration of Love)"	109	16
1979	"Ain't Nobody Like You"	—	—
