= Seal in Red =

1983 studio album by Rufus

Studio album by Rufus
- Released: February 1983
- Studio: Ocean Way, Hollywood, California
- Genre: Funk/Soul
- Length: 38:52
- Label: Warner Bros.
- Producer: George Duke

Rufus chronology
The Very Best of Rufus with Chaka Khan (1982)	Seal in Red (1983)	Stompin' at the Savoy - Live (1983)

Professional ratings
Review scores
Source	Rating
AllMusic	3/5 stars

Seal in Red is the eleventh and final studio album by funk band Rufus, their debut on the Warner Bros. Records label, released in 1983. Seal in Red, which was the band's third album to be recorded without Chaka Khan, peaked at number 49 on Billboard's R&B Albums chart and included the single "Take It to the Top" (US R&B number 47).

Despite featuring guest appearances from a host of other distinguished names in the R&B/Soul/Funk/Jazz genres like keyboardist George Duke, who also produced the album, singers Patti Austin and Ivan Neville, Chicago's trombonist James Pankow, and saxophonist Ernie Watts, Seal in Red was only a moderate commercial success. Following Seal in Red the band reunited with Chaka Khan for one final album together, the double live/studio set Stompin' at the Savoy - Live, before dissolving in late 1983.

== Track listing ==
Side one
No.	Title	Writer(s)	Length
1.	"Take It to the Top"	Tony Maiden, Bobby Watson, David "Hawk" Wolinski	4:15
2.	"The Time Is Right"	Ivan Neville, George Tillman, Nick Daniels III	4:22
3.	"When I Get Over You"	Wolinski, Tom Jans	4:28
4.	"You Turn Me All Around"	Wolinski, David Williams	3:11
5.	"You, the Night and the Music"	Maxayne Lewis, Wornell Jones	3:53

Side two
No.	Title	Writer(s)	Length
6.	"Blinded by the Boogie"	Wolinski, Peter Rafelson	3:27
7.	"I'm Saving This Love Song"	Wolinski	4:01
8.	"You're Really Out of Line"	John Robinson, Wolinski	3:43
9.	"Distant Lovers"	Maiden, David Batteau, Don Freeman	3:31
10.	"No Regrets"	Wolinski	4:01

== Personnel ==
- Tony Maiden – vocals, guitar, bass
- David "Hawk" Wolinski – vocals, keyboards
- John Robinson – drums, keyboards, vocals
- Bobby Watson – bass
- Kevin Murphy – keyboards, vocals
- Ivan Neville – vocals

Additional personnel

- George Duke – piano, synthesizer
- Patti Austin – vocals
- Ernie Watts – saxophone
- James Pankow – trombone
- Paulinho da Costa – percussion

== Production ==
- George Duke – producer
- Tommy Vicari – engineer, re-mixing
- Brent Averill, Nick Spigel, Steve Schmidt, Peter Chaiken – engineer
- Brian Gardner – mastering

== Charts ==
Album

Chart (1983)	Peak
U.S. Billboard Top Black LPs	49

Singles

Year	Single	Peak position
Year	Single	US R&B
1983	"Take It to the Top"	47
