= At Midnight (My Love Will Lift You Up) =

Single by Rufus featuring Chaka Khan

from the album Ask Rufus
- B-side: "Better Days"
- Released: March 1977
- Recorded: 1976–77
- Genre: Funk
- Length: 2:55 (single version) 4:02 (album version)
- Label: ABC
- Songwriters: Tony Maiden, Lalomie Washburn

Rufus featuring Chaka Khan singles chronology
"Jive Talkin'" (1976)	"At Midnight (My Love Will Lift You Up)" (1977)	"Hollywood" (1977)

"At Midnight (My Love Will Lift You Up)" is a hit song by R&B/funk band Rufus featuring Chaka Khan in 1977. Released from their hit album, Ask Rufus, it spent two weeks at number one on the Hot Soul Singles chart and peaked at number thirty on the Billboard Hot 100 singles chart.

== Chart positions ==
Charts	Peak position
U.S. Billboard Hot 100	30
U.S. Billboard Hot Soul Singles	1
