= Do You Love What You Feel =

Single by Rufus and Chaka

from the album Masterjam
- B-side: "Dancin' Mood"
- Released: October 1979
- Genre: R&B, disco
- Length: 4:29
- Label: MCA
- Songwriter: Hawk Wolinski
- Producer: Quincy Jones

Rufus and Chaka singles chronology
"Keep It Together (Declaration of Love)" (1979)	"Do You Love What You Feel" (1979)	"Any Love" (1980)

"Do You Love What You Feel" is a soul/disco song by Rufus and Chaka.

== Background ==
"Do You Love What You Feel" was released in late 1979 from the Quincy Jones produced album, Masterjam.

== Charts ==
"Do You Love What You Feel" spent three weeks at the top of the Hot Soul Singles chart, becoming the fourth of five songs that they would send to the top of that chart; it was the final single to top that chart during the 1970s. It also peaked at number thirty on the Billboard Hot 100 singles chart. Along with the track, "Any Love", "Do You Love What You Feel" peaked at number five on the disco charts.

== Chart positions ==
Chart (1979–1980)	Peak position
U.S. Billboard Disco Top 100	5
U.S. Billboard Hot 100	30
U.S. Billboard Hot Soul Singles	1
