= Happening Live! =

Live album by The Outsiders
- Released: 1967
- Recorded: 1965–1967
- Genre: Rock and roll, garage rock
- Length: 32:05
- Label: Capitol
- Producer: Tom King

The Outsiders chronology
In (1967)	Happening Live! (1967)	Capitol Collectors Series

Professional ratings
Review scores
Source	Rating
Allmusic	3/5 stars

Happening Live! is the fourth album by the Outsiders. Although represented as being a live album, in actuality crowd noises and song introductions were added to studio recordings, some of which had appeared on previous albums.

== Release data ==
The album was released in the LP format on Capitol in August 1967 in both monaural and stereophonic editions (catalogue numbers T 2745 and ST 2745, respectively).

Although never released individually as a CD, the band's third and fourth albums were reissued on Liberty Bell as a "two-fer" CD (catalogue number PCD-4366), along with bonus tracks.

== Background ==
When the single "Gotta Leave Us Alone", released in May 1967, cracked the national charts at number 121, Capitol gave The Outsiders studio time to begin work on a fourth album that was to be called Leave Us Alone. Rather than complete work on that album, however, the band put together a faux "live" album. In addition to adding crowd noise to the recordings, the producers went back to the multi-tracks of the originals and removed the overdubbed string and brass sections.

== Notes on the tracks ==
=== Original LP ===
This album contains several previous hit songs by the band: "Time Won't Let Me", "Girl in Love", "Help Me Girl" and "Respectable". Sonny Geraci introduces the songs and also provides bandmember introductions before "Respectable", although the bass guitarist is introduced only as "Mugsy", and the lead guitarist is introduced as "Grumpy".

The remaining seven songs are all covers that had not been previously released. This is the third album by the band to feature a song made famous by the Temptations; "Ain't Too Proud to Beg" was a May 1966 hit by the band.

The final song on the album – the band's "encore" at the purported concert – is introduced by Sonny Geraci as "Good Lovin'", and is identified on the track listing as "Good Lovin'" by the Young Rascals, but is actually "Good Good Lovin'". The last song on the first side, however, was released as the fourth single by the Young Rascals in September 1966 and was included on their second album, Collections (which was released in January 1967).

=== CD bonus tracks ===
The first two bonus tracks are both sides of the second single that was released by the new band that Sonny Geraci organized in Los Angeles, first billed under the name the Outsiders but later dubbed Climax. The earlier single released in this manner was included among the bonus tracks on the first of the two Liberty Bell CDs. The next two tracks are from a single released by the Outsiders under Tom King's direction, when he reformed the band in Cleveland; the new lead singer replacing Geraci was Jon Simonell. "Waiting for the End to Come" and "Park Preserve" are other selections by Climax, with the latter being the flip side of the band's hit single "Precious and Few".

== Personnel ==
=== Earlier recordings ===
- Tom King, rhythm guitar, tenor saxophone, vocals, arranger
- Sonny Geraci, lead vocals
- Mert Madsen, bass guitar
- Al Austin, lead guitar
- Ronnie Harkai, drums
- Chet Kelley, songwriter
- Mike Geraci, saxophone
- Evan Vanguard, horns
- Tommy Baker, horns and strings arrangements

=== New recordings ===
- Tom King, rhythm guitar, tenor saxophone, vocals, arranger
- Sonny Geraci, lead vocals
- Richard D'Amato, bass guitar
- Walter Nims, lead guitar
- Richie D'Angelo, drums

== Track listing ==
=== Side 1 ===
1. "Time Won't Let Me" (Tom King, Chet Kelley), 3:12
2. "Ain't Too Proud to Beg" (Eddie Holland, Norman Whitfield), 2:20
3. "Show Me" (Joe Tex), 2:40
4. Introduction of the Outsiders, 1:35
5. "Respectable" (Isley Brothers), 2:00
6. "Michelle" (Lennon–McCartney), 2:34
7. "Come on Up" (Felix Cavaliere), 2:53

=== Side 2 ===
1. "Help Me Girl" (Scott English, Lawrence Weiss), 2:49
2. "Girl in Love" (King, Kelley), 3:00
3. "Gloria" (Van Morrison), 2:58
4. "Love Makes the World Go 'Round" (Deon Jackson), 2:57
5. "Good Good Lovin'" (James Brown), 3:07

=== Bonus tracks ===
When released by Liberty Bell, the CD included the tracks on In in the same order as on that LP, followed by the tracks on this album in the same order, then these bonus tracks:

24. "Loving You"
25. "Think I'm Falling" solo version
26. "Tinker Tailer" feat. Jon Simonell
27. "You're Not So Pretty" feat. Jon Simonell
28. "Waiting For the End to Come"
29. "Park Preserve" full-length stereo version
