= In (album) =

Studio album by The Outsiders
- Released: January 1967
- Recorded: 1966
- Genre: Rock and roll, garage rock
- Length: 26:31
- Label: Capitol
- Producer: Tom King

The Outsiders chronology
| Album #2 (1966) | In (1967) | Happening Live! (1967) |

Professional ratings
Review scores
| Source | Rating |
|---|---|
| Allmusic | 4/5 stars |

In is the third studio album by the Outsiders. It is the first album released by the band that did not make the Billboard charts.

== Release ==
CD cover.

The album was released in the LP format on Capitol in January 1967 in both monaural and stereophonic editions (catalogue numbers T 2636 and ST 2636, respectively).

Although never released individually as a CD, the band's third and fourth albums were reissued on Liberty Bell as a "two-fer" CD (catalogue number PCD-4366), along with bonus tracks.

== Cover art ==
The album's cover uses a photograph from the same photo session as the photos on the front and back cover of Album #2, recognizable from the scenery and the fact that all five band members are wearing the same outfits. Clockwise from the bottom, the members are Sonny Geraci, Mert Madsen, Bill Bruno, Ricky Baker, and Tom King.

== Notes on the tracks ==
=== Original LP ===
The fourth and fifth singles released by the Outsiders are included on this album. "Help Me Girl" was the last Top 40 single by the Outsiders and competed with a version by the Animals that was released in the same time period. The B side, "You Gotta Look" was written by Bob Turek, who was now augmenting the songwriting partnership of Tom King and Chet Kelley; both sides of the next single, "I'll Give You Time (to Think it Over)" and "I'm Not Trying To Hurt You" were written by all three of them, as were two additional tracks on the album, "Haunted by Your Love" and "It's Your Love". "I'll Give You Time" was the first Outsiders single which failed to crack the Billboard Hot 100, and features a haunting tone that differs sharply from their typically upbeat singles.

This album included the second recording (the first was by an all-female band called the Models, in 1966) of "Bend Me, Shape Me", more than a year before the song became a U.S. hit for the American Breed and a U.K. hit for Amen Corner. In February 1967 – one month after this album was released – "Kind of a Drag" became a number one hit for the Buckinghams.

=== CD bonus tracks ===
The first two tracks are both sides of the second single that was released by Sonny Geraci for the new band that he organized in Los Angeles; the single was released under the name "the Outsiders" but was later credited to Climax. The earlier single released in this manner was included in the bonus tracks on the first of the two Liberty Bell CDs. The next two tracks are from a single released by the Outsiders under Tom King's direction, when he reorganized the band in Cleveland; the new lead singer replacing Geraci was Jon Simonell. "Waiting for the End to Come" and "Park Preserve" are other selections by Climax.

== Track listing ==
=== Side 1 ===
1. "I'm Not Tryin' to Hurt You" (Tom King, Chet Kelley, Bob Turek) 1:55
2. "Help Me Girl" (Scott English, Laurence Weiss) 2:35
3. "Bend Me, Shape Me" (English, Weiss) 1:55
4. "Kind of a Drag" (Jim Holvay) 2:36
5. "Haunted by Your Love" (King, Kelley, Turek) 2:44
6. "Charlena" (Manuel Chavez, Herman Chaney) 2:18

=== Side 2 ===
1. "You Gotta Look" (Turek) 2:38
2. "I'll Give You Time (to Think it Over)" (King, Kelley, Turek) 2:33
3. "Gimme Some Lovin'" (Steve Winwood, Muff Winwood, Spencer Davis (Note: The label on In erroneously credits Steve Winwood alone. The correct writing credits for the song appear on recordings by other groups, including the original Spencer Davis Group recording, and in BMI records (see BMI work number 469118).)) 2:45
4. "I Wanna Be Free" (Tommy Boyce, Bobby Hart) 2:04
5. "It's Your Love" (King, Kelley, Turek) 2:28

=== Bonus tracks ===
When released by Liberty Bell, the CD included the tracks on this album in the same order as on that LP, followed by the tracks on Happening Live! in the same order, then these bonus tracks:

24. "Loving You"
25. "Think I'm Falling" solo version
26. "Tinker Tailer" feat. Jon Simonell
27. "You're Not So Pretty" feat. Jon Simonell
28. "Waiting for the End to Come"
29. "Park Preserve" full-length stereo version

== Personnel ==
The Outsiders

- Tom King – rhythm guitar, tenor saxophone, backing vocals, lead vocals on "Charlena" and "Gimme Some Lovin'", arrangements
- Sonny Geraci – lead vocals (except on "Charlena" and "Gimme Some Lovin'")
- Mert Madsen – bass guitar
- Bill Bruno – lead guitar
- Ricky Baker – drums

Additional personnel

- Mike Geraci – saxophone
- Evan Vanguard – horns
- Tommy Baker – horns and strings arrangements
