= Album Number 2 =

Album #2

Studio album by The Outsiders
- Released: September 1966
- Recorded: 1966
- Genre: Rock and roll, garage rock
- Label: Capitol
- Producer: Tom King, Roger Karshner

The Outsiders chronology
Time Won't Let Me (1966)	Album #2 (1966)	In (1967)

Album #2 – also known as The Outsiders Album #2 or simply #2 – is the second studio album by the Outsiders.

== Release data ==
The album was released in the LP format on Capitol in September 1966 in both monaural and stereophonic editions (catalogue numbers T 2568 and ST 2568, respectively).

Although never released individually as a CD, the band's first two albums were reissued on Liberty Bell as a "two-fer" CD, along with bonus tracks (catalogue number PCD 4365).

== Notes on the tracks ==
=== Original LP ===
This LP is more of a "blue-eyed soul" album than Time Won't Let Me. Only one of the band's many singles is included, their second biggest seller "Respectable". Also known as "(She's So) Respectable" and "Respectable (What Kind of Girl Is This)", this song was written and released as a single by the Isley Brothers in 1959; though not a hit at that time, the song became more prominent when it was included on the Yardbirds' debut album, Five Live Yardbirds (1964). Its flip side, "Lost in My World" is an original song by the band (written by Tom King and Chet Kelley) and is a different song from the flip side of the 1970 single that was issued in the name the Outsiders and later re-credited to Climax. It closely emulates the band's first hit, "Time Won't Let Me"; both songs feature the same chord sequence, a similar main guitar theme, a highly disconnected vocal melody in the verses, verses which each begin with "I can't...", and a bridge section which has a guitar solo followed by a wordless vocal and a squealing horn crescendo.

"Since I Lost My Baby" was a Top 20 pop hit and a Top 5 R&B hit for the Temptations in mid-1965. The Tommy James and the Shondells version of "Hanky Panky" became a Number One hit in July 1966, shortly before the release of this album; when originally released by the Raindrops, it was a very different song with a slower and more sensual beat. "Cool Jerk" was a popular pop and R&B hit that was released by the Capitols in July 1966, again within weeks of the release of this album.

Another cover, "(Just Like) Romeo and Juliet" was a 1964 hit by the Reflections. One of the lesser known covers on the album, "Wine Wine Wine" was first recorded in 1959 by The Nightcaps.

=== CD bonus tracks ===
The first six bonus tracks are the sides from the last four singles by the band other than the two "B" sides that are included on Album #2; these songs are not included on any of the band's 1960s albums. The last two bonus tracks are alternate versions of two songs that are actually by Climax – Sonny Geraci's band after the Outsiders broke up – although "Think I'm Falling" was first released under the name the Outsiders before Tom King won the rights to the band name in a lawsuit. "Rock and Roll Heaven" went on to be a major hit song by the Righteous Brothers, but not until 1974.

== Track listing ==
=== Side 1 ===
1. "(Just Like) Romeo and Juliet" (Bob Hamilton, Freddie Gorman)
2. "Lost in My World" (Tom King, Chet Kelley)
3. "Since I Lost My Baby" (Smokey Robinson, Warren Moore)
4. "Cool Jerk" (Donald Storball)
5. "Oh How it Hurts" (King, Kelley)
6. "I Will Love You" (King, Kelley)

=== Side 2 ===
1. "Respectable" (O'Kelly Isley, Ronald Isley, Rudolph Isley)
2. "Hanky Panky" (Ellie Greenwich, Jeff Barry)
3. "Lonely Man" (King, Kelley)
4. "Wine Wine Wine" (Billy Joe Shine, David Swartz, Gene Haufler, Jack Allday, Mario Deboub)
5. "Backwards, Upside Down" (King, Kelley)

=== Bonus tracks ===
When released by Liberty Bell, the CD included the tracks on Time Won't Let Me in the same order as on that LP, followed by the tracks on this album in the same order, then these bonus tracks:

23. "Gotta Leave Us Alone"
24. "I Just Can't See You Anymore"
25. "I'll See You in the Summertime"
26. "And Now You Want My Sympathy"
27. "Little Bit of Lovin'"
28. "We Ain't Gonna Make It"
29. "Think I'm Falling", group version
30. "Rock and Roll Heaven", alternate version

== Personnel ==
The Outsiders

- Tom King – rhythm guitar, tenor saxophone, backing vocals, lead vocals on "Hanky Panky" and "Wine Wine Wine", arrangements
- Sonny Geraci – lead vocals (except on "Wine Wine Wine")
- Mert Madsen – bass guitar, harmonica
- Bill Bruno – lead guitar
- Ricky Biagiola [credited as Ricky Baker] – drums

Additional personnel

- Ronnie Harkai – drums
- Mike Geraci – saxophone
- Evan Vanguard – horns
- Tommy Baker – horns and strings arrangements
