= Ciao Baby =

Ciao Baby may refer to:

- Ciao, Baby, a 2007 album by The Start
- "Ciao Baby", a song written by Larry Weiss and Scott English
- Ciao, Baby!, a play by Kent R. Brown

== See also ==
- "Edie (Ciao Baby)", a 1989 song by The Cult
