= Time Won't Let Me (album) =

Studio album by The Outsiders
- Released: May 1966
- Recorded: 1965–1966
- Genres: Rock and roll, garage rock
- Length: 27:06
- Label: Capitol
- Producer: Tom King

The Outsiders chronology
Time Won't Let Me (1966)	Album #2 (1966)

Time Won't Let Me is the first studio album by the Outsiders. It was named after the band's early 1966 break-out single, "Time Won't Let Me".

== Release data ==
The album was released in the LP format on Capitol in May 1966 in both monaural and stereophonic editions (catalogue numbers T 2501 and ST 2501, respectively).

Although never released individually as a CD, the band's first two albums were reissued on Liberty Bell as a "two-fer" CD, along with bonus tracks (catalogue number PCD-4365).

== Notes on the tracks ==
=== Original LP ===
This album includes all four sides of the band's first two singles, all of which were written by Tom King and Chet Kelley. Their best-known song, "Time Won't Let Me" was a Top 5 single in early 1966, and used elements of both Merseybeat and Motown that were dominating the charts in that time period: a brass section, a la the Motown sound, with the big beat formula of the Beatles. It remained one of the most played songs on Classic rock radio stations for several decades after its release.

Their next single, "Girl in Love", was already charting when the final tracks were laid down for this album. It was written about bassist Mert Madsen's fiancée.

The cover songs that constitute the rest of the album include "Listen People" (a hit earlier in 1966 by Herman's Hermits); Buddy Holly's 1958 hit "Maybe Baby"; the pop music confection "Rockin' Robin" (also from 1958); the Spencer Davis Group's first Number One single "Keep on Running" (from 1965); and "She Cried" (originally a 1962 hit by Jay and the Americans).

"Time Won't Let Me" was later covered by the all-woman rock band, The Heart Beats and was also covered in 1981 by Iggy Pop on his album, Party.

=== CD bonus tracks ===
The first six bonus tracks are the sides from the last four singles by the band other than the two "B" sides that are included on Album #2; these songs are not included on any of the band's 1960s albums. The last two bonus tracks are alternate versions of two songs that are actually by Climax – Sonny Geraci's band after the Outsiders broke up – although "Think I'm Falling" was first released under the name the Outsiders before Tom King won the rights to the band name in a lawsuit. "Rock and Roll Heaven" went on to be a major hit song by the Righteous Brothers, but not until 1974.

== Reception ==
Professional ratings
Review scores
Source	Rating
Allmusic	4.5/5 stars

== Track listing ==
=== Side 1 ===
1. "Keep on Running" (Jackie Edwards), 2:20
2. "Listen People" (Graham Gouldman), 2:29
3. "Time Won't Let Me" (Tom King, Chet Kelley) 2:47
4. "My Girl" (William Robinson, Ronald White), 2:27
5. "What Makes You So Bad, You Weren't Brought up that Way" (King, Kelley) 2:20
6. "She Cried" (Greg Richards, Ted Daryll), 2:21

=== Side 2 ===
1. "Chase Away the Tears" (King, Kelley) 2:42
2. "Was it Really Real" (King, Kelley) 2:11
3. "Maybe Baby" (Buddy Holly, Norman Petty), 1:58
4. "Rockin' Robin" (Jeanne Vikki), 2:30
5. "Girl in Love" (King, Kelley) 3:01

=== CD bonus tracks ===
When released by Liberty Bell, the CD included the above tracks in the same order, followed by the tracks on Album #2 in the same order as on that LP, then these bonus tracks:

1. "Gotta Leave Us Alone"
2. "I Just Can't See You Anymore"
3. "I'll See You in the Summertime"
4. "And Now You Want My Sympathy"
5. "Little Bit of Lovin'"
6. 'We Ain't Gonna Make It"
7. "Think I'm Falling", group version
8. "Rock and Roll Heaven", alternate version

== Personnel ==
=== The Outsiders ===
- Tom King - rhythm guitar, lead vocals and backing vocals
- Sonny Geraci - lead vocals and backing vocals
- Bill Bruno - lead guitar
- Al Austin - lead guitar
- Mert Madsen - bass, harmonica and backing vocals
- Jimmy Fox - drums
- Ronnie Harkai - drums

=== Session musicians ===
- Gayle Guhde – hammond organ
- Mike Geraci – baritone saxophone
- Hank Geer - saxophone
- John Madrid – trumpet
- Tommy Baker – horn and strings arrangements
