= Roots of the Outsiders =

Compilation album by Tom King and the Starfires
- Released: 1996
- Genre: Rock and roll, rhythm and blues
- Label: Collectables Records

Roots of the Outsiders is a retrospective album by the Starfires that has been released in CD format. This album lists the band name as Tom King and the Starfires, an alternate name for the group and also highlighting the original bandleader for the Outsiders.

== Release data ==
This album was released in 1996 by Collectables Records as a CD (#COL 0695).

== Notes on the tracks ==
The Starfires were active from 1958 to 1965, when the band name was changed to the Outsiders. Their forte was rhythm and blues instrumentals primarily, with Tom King occasionally providing soulful vocals. The first four songs and the last cut are the only tracks on this album that feature any vocals.

The two opening tracks, "Please Don't Leave Me" and "I Love You 'Cause I Love You" are probably original songs; each has lyrics that mainly repeat the titles with some variations – e.g., "I need you 'cause I need you". On the CD, the tracks are evidently taken from a broadcast on a local radio station in Cleveland (along with a brief interview of Tom King by the disk jockey) in an on-air contest to see which song the listeners like the best.

"Stronger than Dirt" – based upon a popular television commercial for Ajax cleanser – was a minor local hit song for the band in the early 1960s; besides the tune used in the commercial, the track also features hoofbeats from the white knight on horseback that is the centerpiece of the original ad. The lead guitar part was written and played by Rockin' Ray Miller (Grab Your Balls We're Going Bowling) while the sax parts were done by Tony Sawyer. Further details on the recordings are not available.

Despite the reference in the name of the album, these recordings actually bear little resemblance to those of the better known Outsiders; although some of their r&b roots are still apparent, the latter band has a different style that is generally categorized as garage rock, and Outsiders vocalist Sonny Geraci sounds much different from Tom King.

== Track listing ==
1. Please Don't Leave Me
2. I Love You 'Cause I Love You
3. Ring of Love
4. Cheating Game
5. Stronger Than Dirt
6. Honest Injun
7. Jam Session #1
8. Honky Tonk
9. Night Walk
10. Billy's Blues
11. Chartreuse Caboose
12. Jam Session #2
13. Sweet Georgia Brown
14. I Know
