= Pumpkin, Powder, Scarlet & Green =

Studio album by The American Breed
- Released: 1968
- Recorded: 1968
- Studio: Universal Recording Corporation, Chicago, Illinois
- Genre: Pop, rock
- Length: 27:58
- Label: Acta
- Producer: Bill Traut

The American Breed chronology
Bend Me, Shape Me (1968)	Pumpkin, Powder, Scarlet & Green (1968)	Lonely Side of the City (1968)

Professional ratings
Review scores
Source	Rating
AllMusic	2.5/5 stars

Pumpkin, Powder, Scarlet & Green is the third album by the 1960s pop group The American Breed, released in 1968. The album was not as successful as their first two efforts, but the album did manage to have three modest hit singles: "Cool It (We're Not Alone)", "Ready, Willing and Able" (#84), and a cover version of the Troggs' "Anyway That You Want Me" (#88). This album marked a beginning in decline of the group's popularity.

== Track listing ==
No.	Title	Writer(s)	Length
1.	"Pumpkin"	Eddie Higgins	0:58
2.	"Cool It (We're Not Alone)"	Kenny Young, Scott English	2:14
3.	"Welcome, You're in Love"	Jerry Riopelle, Murray MacLeod, Stuart Margolin	2:40
4.	"The Right to Cry"	Gerry Goffin, Carole King	3:06
5.	"Ready, Willing and Able"	Bob Stone	2:26
6.	"Take Me if You Want Me"	Al Ciner, Chuck Colbert, Gary Loizzo, Lee Graziano	2:24
7.	"Powder"	Eddie Higgins	0:44
8.	"Scarlet"	Eddie Higgins	1:07
9.	"Anyway That You Want Me"	Chip Taylor	2:24
10.	"Master of My Fate"	Larry Weiss	2:23
11.	"Music to Think By"	Bobby Whiteside, Richard Boyell	2:20
12.	"Train on a One-Track Mind"	Arthur Resnick, Joey Levine	2:10
13.	"I'm Gonna Make You Mine"	Bill Carr, Carl D'Errico, Carole Bayer Sager	2:15
14.	"Green"	Eddie Higgins	0:47

== Personnel ==
=== The American Breed ===
- Gary Loizzo – lead guitar, lead vocals
- Al Ciner – rhythm guitar, backing vocals
- Charles Colbert – bass, backing vocals
- Lee Graziano – drums, backing vocals, trumpet

=== Additional musicians ===
- Ralph Craig – trombone
- Bobby Lewis, Bobby Howell, Arthur Hoyle – trumpets
- Lenard Druss – saxophone

=== Technical ===
- Bill Traut, Skeet Bushor, Bob Keene – producers
- Eddie Higgins – arrangements
- Jerry DeClercq – engineer
- Christopher Whorf – art direction
- George Whitemen – photography, design
