= Bend Me, Shape Me (album) =

Studio album by The American Breed
- Released: February 1968
- Recorded: 1967
- Studio: Universal Recording Corporation, Chicago, Illinois
- Genre: Pop, rock
- Length: 29:42
- Label: Acta
- Producer: Bill Traut

The American Breed chronology
The American Breed (1967)	Bend Me, Shape Me (1968)	Pumpkin, Powder, Scarlet & Green (1968)

Professional ratings
Review scores
Source	Rating
Allmusic	3/5 stars

Bend Me, Shape Me is the second album from the 1960s rock group The American Breed, released in February 1968.

== Overview ==
The album peaked at No. 99 on Billboard's pop albums chart, and the title song, a cover of The Outsiders 1966 song, became the group's only Top 10 hit, reaching No. 5 on Billboard's pop singles chart in February 1968. The album and the single both went gold, and remains the group's biggest selling album to this day. The only other major hit single from this album was a cover of The Vulcanes 1966 song "Green Light" (No. 39).

== Track listing ==
No.	Title	Writer(s)	Length
1.	"Green Light"	Annette Tucker, Nancy Mantz	2:15
2.	"Don't It Make You Cry"	Al Ciner	3:10
3.	"Mindrocker"	Keith Colley, Linda Colley	2:38
4.	"Bird"	Ciner, Gary Loizzo	2:39
5.	"Something You've Got"	Chris Kenner	2:47
6.	"Don't Make Me Leave You"	Martin Siegel, Scott English	2:18
7.	"Bend Me, Shape Me"	Larry Weiss, English	2:25
8.	"Before and After"	Van McCoy	2:45
9.	"Sometime in the Morning"	Gerry Goffin, Carole King	2:20
10.	"I've Been Tryin'"	Curtis Mayfield	3:05
11.	"No Easy Way Down"	Goffin, King	3:20

== Personnel ==
- Gary Loizzo - lead guitar, lead vocals
- Al Ciner - rhythm guitar, backing vocals
- Charles Colbert - bass, backing vocals
- Lee Graziano - drums, backing vocals, trumpet

== Charts ==
Chart (1968)	Peak position
US Billboard Top LPs	99
