= The Starfires (Cleveland band) =

American rock and roll band (1958–1965)

Tom King and the Starfires
- Origin: Cleveland, Ohio, U.S.
- Genres: Rock and roll
- Years active: 1958–1965
- Label: Pama
- Past members: Tom King; Mert Madsen; Walter Nims; Howard Blank; Dennis Slifko; Tony Sawyer; Jim Fox; Sonny Geraci; Ronnie Harkai; Al Austin; Richard D'Amato

The Starfires is an American rock and roll band founded in Cleveland, Ohio, in 1958 by Tom King when he was 15. The band is usually identified as Tom King and the Starfires. King is best known as the original bandleader of the Outsiders; however, it was only at the insistence of Capitol Records that the band's name was changed when they created their breakout hit "Time Won't Let Me".

== History ==
The Starfires were formed by Tom King at Shaw High School in Cleveland in 1958, and remained a popular local band through the mid-1960s. Their forte was rhythm and blues instrumentals, with occasional vocals by King. Also, his uncle, Patrick Connelly owned a record company, Pama Records; and the band (along with at least one single by Tom King individually) produced several sides over this period, notably "Stronger than Dirt" (which charted locally) that was based on a well-known jingle for Ajax Laundry Detergent. King had a tonsillectomy, limiting his singing, so he added a new lead singer – Sonny Geraci – and changed the band's sound somewhat to match the musical tastes of the period. This led to the eventual creation of the Outsiders.

== Post break-up ==
Geraci and Nims were among the founding members of Climax. Jimmy (Jim) Fox and Richard Kriss's brother, Tommy Kriss, were the founders of the James Gang. Harkai was a member of The Pilgrims a popular Cleveland rock band in the early to mid-1960s, prior to joining The Starfires.

== Band members ==
- Tom King, guitarist, vocals
- Walter Nims, lead guitar
- Howard Blank, drums
- Dennis Slifko, saxophone
- Mert Madsen, bass guitar, harmonica
- Richard Kriss, "lead guitar"
- Tony Sawyer, saxophone (joined in the early 1960s)
- Ray Miller, lead guitar (early 1964)
- Jimmy Fox, drums (played with the Starfires for a short time while attending college)
- Sonny Geraci, lead vocals (joined in 1964)
- Ronnie Harkai, drums (joined in 1964-during which time The Starfires transitioned into the band, The Outsiders)

Jazz sax player, Tony "The Big T" Lovano also played with the Starfires on numerous gigs throughout Cleveland. Tony (deceased) was the Dad of Grammy Award-winning sax player, Joe Lovano.

=== Discography ===
- Tom King and the Starfires – Ring of Love (Pama, 1960)
- Tom King with the Ardells and the Starfires – I Know (Pama, 1961)
- Tom King and Starfires – Stronger than Dirt (EMK, 1963)
- The Starfires – Billy's Blues (Pama, 1961)
- Tom King and the Starfires – Please Don't Leave Me (Rescue, 1963)
- Tom King and the Starfires – Night Walk (Pop-Side)

Retrospective CD

- Tom King and the Starfires – Roots of the Outsiders; Collectables Records
