= Ciao Baby (song) =

Single by The Toys
- B-side: "I Got Carried Away"
- Released: February 1967
- Genre: Pop
- Length: 2:11
- Label: Philips
- Songwriters: Larry Weiss, Scott English
- Producer: Alan Lorber

"Ciao Baby" is a song written by Larry Weiss and Scott English, and recorded by several artists. It was most successful in Australia and New Zealand, where a prominent local artist in each country released a hit version.

== Toys version ==
The original release of "Ciao Baby" was on a single by American female vocal group the Toys in February 1967, followed soon after on singles by the Montanas and by Lynne Randell, both in March 1967.

== Montanas version ==
The release by English band the Montanas was produced by the notable British composer, arranger and producer Tony Hatch.

According to British music magazine Record Mirror, 10,000 copies of the single sold in the United Kingdom, not enough to register on the unofficial British charts then in use. It was heard on Radio London, a pirate radio station where it was highlighted as a "climber" or predicted hit by disc jockey John Peel. It appeared once on Radio London's playlist chart The Fab 40, at number 31 on 19 March 1967, alongside the original version by the Toys.

The Montanas' version fared better in Australia, where it co-charted with Lynne Randell's version in three capital cities. Pye Records reissued the song in April 1969 with a different B-side.

== Lynne Randell version ==
Lynne Randell was an Australian singer, but the song was recorded in New York, produced by Ted Cooper and arranged and conducted by notable American producer-arranger-conductor Herb Bernstein. It was released in the United States on an Epic single in March 1967. The Australian release on CBS in April was a Top 10 single in the country overall. See: Lynne Randell:Charted Singles

== Craig Scott version ==
In 1971, a local version by Craig Scott charted at number 4 in New Zealand.

== Other versions ==
- The Eternal Flame (USA, not the Dutch hard rock band)
- Ray Rivera And Orchestra
- Group Check
- Lena Junoff
- Nola York
- Gunter Gabriel
- Long John Baldry
- Mel Tormé
- Catherine McKinnon
- Lello Tartarino
- Alfredo Malabello
- Emma Birdsall in Love Child
