= Craig Scott (singer) =

New Zealand pop singer (born 1950)

David Alan Craig Scott (born 1950) is a New Zealand pop singer who had several commercially successful singles in the 1970s.

== Early life ==
Scott was born in 1950 and grew up in Dunedin, where he was educated at King's High School. After leaving school, he found work as a bank clerk at the National Bank, where he stayed for 2½ years.

== Singing career ==
Scott began his music career in the late 1960s, singing with the local Dunedin band Klap.

In 1968, Scott joined the band The Fantasy which shortly thereafter moved from Dunedin to Christchurch. For some time Craig Scott and The Fantasy were the resident group at "The Scene" dance hall/nightclub at 224 Tuam St Christchurch.

Scott then joined the band Revival which won a Battle of the Bands contest in May 1969. Winning the contest brought the band to the attention of His Master's Voice and they were invited to Wellington to record a single, Viva Bobby Joe, which peaked at #14 on the national singles chart.

In April 1970, Scott was offered a solo career and left Revival, which subsequently broke up. He was given a starring role in the television music series Happen Inn, which brought him national attention. He released a series of commercially successful singles beginning with a cover version of Neil Sedaka's Star Crossed Lovers which spent four weeks at number one on the New Zealand charts and was Scott's only number one single. Other singles included Let's Get A Little Sentimental; Smiley (a cover of Australian pop star Ronnie Burns's hit); Ciao Baby (1971) which was previously covered by Lynne Randell for a top ten hit in Australia (1967); and When Jojo Runs.

On 27 February 1973, Scott married Joanne Rowe at Caversham Presbyterian Church.

In 1974, Happen Inn was cancelled and Scott began to lose popularity. Around 1975, his last single to be successful was Wind and Rain, peaking at #11 on the New Zealand pop chart.

- "Star Crossed Lovers" [NZ #1]
- "Let's Get a Little Sentimental" [NZ #4]
- "Peaceful Mountain" [NZ #12]
- "Can I Believe In You" [NZ #3]
- "Smiley" [NZ #3]
- "One More Mountain to Climb" [NZ #14]
- "When Jo Jo Runs" [NZ #5]
- "Wind and Rain" [NZ #11]
- "Rock and Roll (I Gave You the Best Years of My Life)" [NZ #13]

== Retirement from performing and later life ==
Scott retired from performing in the late 1970s, saying "I couldn't see myself doing that for the next 20 years". He became a music promoter. He then started New Zealand's first video rental business before managing Warner Brothers Video New Zealand for 15 years.

In 2001, Scott and his wife moved back to Dunedin. They got into the property business, renovating houses, and in the late 2000s they moved to the small Central Otago town of Arrowtown, becoming real estate agents there.
