= The Montanas =

English pop rock band

The Montanas were an English 1960s and 1970s pop rock band from Wolverhampton, England. Though they never found significant success in their home country, they had one moderate hit in the United States.

The group formed in 1964 and became known for their live shows. Their manager, Roger Allen, had them signed to Pye Records, and some of their early releases for Pye were written by Tony Hatch and Jackie Trent. In 1966 Terry Rowley joined the group on keyboards, and also worked with the group on composition and arranging. They released two singles in the year, the second of which, "That's When Happiness Began" b/w "Goodbye Little Girl", became a steady seller in the autumn of 1966 when it received extensive radio play. The band's breakthrough came later in the year when they became the opening act for the Walker Brothers tour across the UK, concluding in November 1966. More singles followed, and the band appeared on radio programmes like Easy Beat and Saturday Club, and touring expanded to other countries including France, the Netherlands, and Germany. One single in particular, "Ciao Baby" b/w "Anyone There", was released in March 1967, and sold over 10,000 copies in Britain alone. The band re-released the song "Ciao Baby" (written by Scott English and Larry Weiss) in 1969.

Their several radio hits in England made little impact on the charts, but "You've Got to Be Loved", which was released on October 13, 1967, spent seven weeks on the U.S. Billboard Hot 100, debuting at number 100 the week of March 2, 1968 and peaking at number 58 the weeks of March 30 and April 6, 1968. It also reached number 41 on Cashbox, and number 33 on Record World, followed by "Run to Me" making it to number 121 on the Billboard Bubbling Under Hot 100 Singles charts and number 96 on Cashbox. The band, however, was unable to promote the single in the US, so no other national hits followed. Their lineup changed considerably in 1967 and again in 1968, and they continued releasing singles, often written by outside writers, that were more radio-friendly than their live sound. In 1969, the group left the Pye label, and Rowley and vocalist John Jones quit, wanting to perform more original material. The group continued to perform throughout most of the 1970s, though mixing comedy with the music in their performances, and finally broke up in 1978. Vocalist Ian "Sludge" Lees later found success as a comedian, and bassist Jake Elcock pursued a career in A&R.

In 1997, Sequel Records issued a 26-track compilation CD, "You've Got To Be Loved (Singles A's & B's)," including ten tracks newly mixed from original multi-tracks.

== Members ==
- Will Hayward – guitar
- Graham Crew – drums
- Ralph Oakley – bass
- John Jones – vocals
- Terry Rowley – keyboards (joined 1966)
- Jake Elcock – bass (joined 1967)
- Graham Hollis – drums (joined 1967)
- Barry Clifft – drums & vocals (dates unknown)
- Bob Cross – guitar & vocals (joined 1977 ex Alvin Stardust)
- Pete Mackie – bass & vocals
- Ian "Sludge" Lees – Vocals (joined 1968)
- George Davies – vocals (joined 1968)
- Allen Austin – Guitar & Vocals / Bass Guitar & Vocals
- Brian Eustace – Guitar & Vocals
- Neil Craddock - Bass Guitar & Vocals

== Road crew ==
- John Kirby
- Micky Winfer
- Shaun Gillam
- Keith Mantle
- Loz Collins
- Cozmic Dave
- Les Gilfilan

== Discography ==
Singles

- All That Is Mine Can Be Yours b/w How Can You Tell (Piccadilly 7N 35262, September 1965)
- That's When Happiness Began b/w Goodbye Little Girl (Pye 7N 17183, September 1966)
- "Ciao Baby" b/w Anyone There (Pye 7N 17282, March 1967; released in US as Warner Bros 7208)
- Take My Hand b/w Top Hat (Pye 7N 17338, June 1967; released in US as Independence 79)
- You've Got to Be Loved b/w Difference of Opinion (Pye 7N 17394, October 1967; released in US as Independence 83)
- A Step in the Right Direction b/w Someday (You'll Be Breaking My Heart Again) (Pye 7N 17499, April 1968)
- I'm Gonna Change b/w A Step in the Right Direction (US version of the above, date unknown, Independence 87)
- Run to Me b/w You're Making a Big Mistake (Pye 7N 17597, September 1968; released in US as Independence 89)
- Roundabout b/w Mystery (Pye 7N 17697, February 1969)
- Heaven Help You b/w Roundabout (US only, Independence 93)
- Ciao Baby b/w Someday (reissue) (Pye 7N 17729, April 1969)
- Let's Get a Little Sentimental b/w Hey Diddle Diddle (Decca 32682, 1970)
- Uncle John's Band (cover) b/w Doctor Nero (MAM 14, 1971)
- No Smoke Without Fire b/w Seaport (MAM 45, 1971)
- Suzanne b/w Your Love Is Growing (MAM 62, 1972)
- Love Machine b/w Oh but I Love You (Charisma 265, 1975?)

Compilation CD

- You've Got to Be Loved (Singles A's & B's) (Sequel NEMCD 994, 1997, UPC 023224 099426)

== Charts ==
Year	Titles	Peak chart positions			Album
Year	Titles	U.S. Billboard Hot 100	U.S. Cash Box	U.S. Record World	Album
1968	"You've Got to Be Loved"	58	41	33	
1968	"Run to Me"	121	96		
1970	"Let's Get a Little Sentimental"	—	—	—	
