= Lynne Randell =

English-Australian pop singer (1949–2007)

- Born: Lynne Randall; 14 December 1949; Liverpool, England
- Origin: British
- Died: 8 June 2007 (aged 57) Melbourne, Australia
- Genres: Pop, soul, Northern soul
- Occupations: Singer, personal assistant
- Instrument: Vocals
- Years active: 1965–1969
- Labels: His Master's Voice, CBS, Epic, Raven

Lynne Randell (born Lynne Randall; 14 December 1949 – 8 June 2007) was an English Australian pop singer. For three years in the mid-1960s, she was Australia's most popular female performer and had hits with "Heart" and "Goin' Out of My Head" in 1966, and "Ciao Baby" in 1967. In 1967, Randell toured the United States with The Monkees and performed on-stage with support act Jimi Hendrix. She wrote for teen magazine, Go-Set, and television programme guide, TV Week. While on the US tour, Randell became addicted to methamphetamine, an addiction which she battled for most of her life.

== Early life ==
Lynne Randell was born as Lynne Randall in Liverpool, England, in 1949 and had started primary school. When five years old, her family migrated to Australia and settled in the Melbourne suburb of Murrumbeena. She later attended Mordialloc High School. She completed Form Three and won a talent quest at a school fete – the prize was a one-week engagement at Lorne on the Victorian surf coast. At the age of 14, Randell started working for celebrity hairdresser Lillian Frank on a trial basis and promptly asked for annual holidays to fulfil her singing gig. Frank required proof:

"Vell, if you're such a singer then sing for me and I will decide." The dryers were turned off ... I stood there and sang. At the end, everyone applauded and Lillian said, "That's very good dah-ling, you can have your holidays."

At the Lorne Life Saving Club she sang with a band, The Spinning Wheels, and met a surfie-roadie and university student, Ian "Molly" Meldrum, with whom she formed a lifelong friendship. Meldrum became a pop music commentator, writing for teen magazine, Go-Set, hosting television music series, Countdown, and providing opinions in various media.

== Recording career ==
Randell was 'discovered' whilst working as a 14-year-old apprentice hairdresser for Lilian and Antonio Frank. One of Frank's regular customers was publicist, Carol West. Garry Spry, the manager of Australian mod group The Flies, employed West to organise a publicity shoot for TV and press to display his band having their long hair done at a women's hair salon. During the shoot, The Flies lead singer, Ronnie Burns sang with his guitar and Frank suggested her young apprentice should sing along. Spry was so impressed by her voice he offered her a job at his discothèque, Pinocchios, and West became her manager. For Randell's 15th birthday on 14 December 1964, West held a party in Malvern and invited local radio DJs including Stan Rofe. The Spinning Wheels backed Randell as she sang "House of the Rising Sun" and John Lee Hooker's "Boom Boom". She cut a demo in a dining room and Rofe played it on his radio show.

Randell left school and was signed to EMI in 1965, her first single "I'll Come Running Over" (cover of a Lulu song) was released in February on its His Master's Voice and became a No. 11 hit in Melbourne. She appeared on television to promote her single including Bandstand, Saturday Date and Sing Sing Sing. The first single was followed by "A Love Like You" (No. 27 in Melbourne) and "Forever". She had regular appearances on TV's The Go!! Show alongside contemporaries The Easybeats and Olivia Newton-John. Randell also appeared on another TV series, Kommotion with fellow pop artists including Burns (now a solo artist) and also featured performers miming to overseas artists' hits: Meldrum, for example, mimed to "Winchester Cathedral" by The New Vaudeville Band. Randell signed a new contract with CBS Records to release two further singles "Heart" and "Goin' Out of My Head" which both became Top 20 hits in Melbourne.

Randell worked the dance scene and discothèques, usually backed by The Spinning Wheels, with her trendsetting clothes and mod style carefully orchestrated by manager, West.

She just had a look ... I was told she had a good voice ... She's got a look that we try to make all the kids follow—whatever it happens to be: bell-bottom pants, backless dresses, striped tops—she's started quite a few fashion trends in Melbourne.

— Carol West

Randell was marketed as Australia's Miss Mod and became the most popular female performer in the mid-1960s. Teen magazine, Go-Set, had separate columns written by Meldrum and Rofe, it also ran a pop poll, with Randell voted 'Most Popular Female Vocal' in October 1966. "Goin' Out of My Head" peaked at No. 16 on the Go-Set National Top 40 in November.

On the back of her Australian success, Randell went to the United Kingdom and performed at Liverpool's Cavern Club. By 1967, she was in the United States, where she met The Monkees and had a brief relationship with Davy Jones. She toured with them as part of a bill which also featured Jimi Hendrix and Ike & Tina Turner. Randell wrote in Go-Set and television programme guide, TV Week, of her experiences while touring the US. Her next single, "Ciao Baby" written by Larry Weiss and Scott English, was recorded in New York and released on CBS Records in Australia. It reached No. 6 on Go-Set's Top 40 in June 1967. Epic Records also released it in the US, Randell shot a colour video for "Ciao Baby" which is believed to be the first by an Australian artist. The Australian B-side, "Stranger in My Arms" was released in the UK as the A-side. It went on to become a Northern Soul classic, in part due to the lack of sales. While touring the US, Randell became addicted to methamphetamine tablets which were sold legally as slimming pills. She developed a long term addiction which subsequently damaged her brain, nervous system and adrenal glands.

Her next single "That's a Hoe Down" / "I Need You Boy" appeared in 1967 and she won another 'Most Popular Female Vocal' from Go-Set pop poll in October. Randell moved to Los Angeles in 1968 and released "An Open Letter". However, she had health problems with glandular fever and then peritonitis. Her last single, "I Love My Dog" was released in 1969 on Capitol Records.

== Marriage ==
Randell married Abe Hoch, an Atlantic Records company executive, in 1969. She provided a weekly column for Go-Set as their US correspondent – their home was the US office for Go-Set Publications – during 1970 and 1971. In 1972, their son Jamieson Hoch was born. Abe Hoch later became head of Swan Song Records and they moved to London in 1976 where Randell had further health problems related to her methamphetamine addiction and prescriptions by doctors. This caused difficulties for their marriage and led to their divorce by the late 1970s.

== Later career and death ==
After the end of her marriage, Randell returned to Australia in 1980, then worked as a personal assistant to Meldrum, who was by then compère of Countdown, until 1986. Randell worked for Seymour Stein of Sire Records as his personal assistant in New York during the late 1980s, living close to her son Jamieson. Randell moved back to Melbourne in the 1990s and made occasional appearances in oldies concerts.

Randell went public about her methamphetamine addiction in 2004 in an interview with Peter Wilmoth of The Age. She indicated that her adrenal glands were atrophied to about 30% function. Randell was found dead at her home in Toorak, Melbourne, on 8 June 2007. Police said that there were "no suspicious circumstances". She left notes and gifts for family and friends. Although her father had died three years earlier, she was survived by her mother, brothers, sister, son (Jamieson) and two grandchildren.

Jamieson Hoch, 35, died of a brain haemorrhage on 24 July 2007 only weeks after he joined mourners at St Kilda beach where he spoke about his mother and scattered her ashes in the water.

== Discography ==
=== Albums ===
- Dynamic Lynne Randell – (Raven Records, 1986)
- Stranger in My Arms – (EM Records, 2004)

=== Extended plays ===
- CBS Presents Lynne Randell – (CBS, 1966)
- Ciao Baby – (CBS, 1967)

=== Singles ===
U.S. releases

- "Ciao Baby" / "Stranger in My Arms" – Epic 5-10147 – (1967)
- "That's a Hoe Down" / "I Need You Boy" – Epic 5-10197 – (1967)
- "Wasn't It You" / "Grey Day" – Silvercloud Records 105 – (1968)
- "Right to Cry" / "An Open Letter" – Silvercloud Records 1002 – (1968)
- "The Right to Cry" / "An Open Letter" – ABC Records 11112 – (1968)
- "I Love My Dog" / "Mind Excursion" – Capitol 2683 – (1969)

=== Charted singles ===
Year	Single	Chart Position
Year	Single	AUS
1965	"I'll Come Running Over"	31
1965	"A Love Like You"	47
1965	"Forever"	60
1966	"Heart"	41
1966	"Goin' Out of My Head"	34
1967	"Ciao Baby"	8
1967	"That's a Hoedown"	55
1968	"An Open Letter"	-
1969	"I Love My Dog"	-

TELEVISION

Year	Title	Performance	Type
1965	Saturday Date	Herself	TV series, 1 episode
1965	Sing Sing Sing	Herself – Singer	TV series, 1 episode
1965–1966	Bandstand	Herself – Singer	TV series, 4 episodes
1965–1967	The Go!! Show	Herself – Singer	TV series, 28 episodes
1966	Kommotion	Herself	TV series
1967	Dig We Must	Herself – Guest	ABC TV series, 1 episode
1969; 1980	The Mike Walsh Show	Herself – Guest	TV series, 1 episode
1980	The Mike Walsh Show	Guest - Herself	TV series, 1 episode
1981	Australian Music Stars of the 60's	Herself – Archive clip	TV special
1983	Countdown Music & Video Awards	Herself sings "Ciao' Baby"	ABC TV special
1983	The Daryl Somers Show	Herself – Guest	TV series, 1 episode
1986	Neighbours	Herself – Molly Meldrum's Assistant	TV series, 1 episode
1987	Hey Hey It's Saturday	Herself sings "Ciao Baby"	TV series, 1 episode
1995	Australian Women In Rock And Pop Music	Herself	TV Documentary
1998	When Rock Was Young: The 60's	Herself	TV special
2003	Love Is in the Air	Herself	ABC TV series, 1 episode 2: "She's Leaving Home"
2014	Ten News	Herself – Death report	TV series, 1 episode
2014	Nine News	Herself – Death report	TV series, 1 episode
2014	Seven News	Herself – Death report	TV series, 1 episode
2014	Sky News	Herself – Death report	TV series, 1 episode
2014	ABC News	Herself – Death report	TV series, 1 episode

== Awards and nominations ==
=== Go-Set Pop Poll ===
The Go-Set Pop Poll was coordinated by teen-oriented pop music newspaper, Go-Set and was established in February 1966 and conducted an annual poll during 1966 to 1972 of its readers to determine the most popular personalities.

Year	Nominee / work	Award	Result
1966	herself	Female Vocal	1st
1967	herself	Female Vocal	1st
1968	herself	Female Vocal	2nd
1969	herself	Female Vocal	5th
