= Let's Get a Little Sentimental =

Song written by Mike Leander

"Let's Get A Little Sentimental"

Single by The Montanas
- B-side: "Hey Diddle Diddle"
- Released: March 1970 (U.S.)
- Genre: Pop
- Label: Decca
- Songwriter(s): Mike Leander, Seago
- Producer(s): Mike Leander

The Montanas singles chronology
"Run to Me" (1970)	"Let's Get A Little Sentimental" (1970)	"Uncle John's Band" (1971)

"Let's Get A Little Sentimental"

Single by Craig Scott
- B-side: "They Call the Wind Maria"
- Released: August 1970 (NZ)
- Recorded: 1970
- Genre: Pop
- Label: His Master's Voice
- Songwriter(s): Leander, Seago
- Producer(s): Peter Dawkins

Craig Scott singles chronology
"Run to Me" (1970)	"Let's Get A Little Sentimental" (1970)	"Uncle John's Band" (1971)

"Let's Get A Little Sentimental" is a song written by Mike Leander and originally released by The Montanas in 1970. It was released as a single but did not chart.

== Craig Scott cover ==
The song was covered by New Zealand singer Craig Scott later that year. It became a hit in his home nation, spending two weeks at number four.

== Other versions ==
"Let's Get A Little Sentimental" was also covered by the British band The Sensations in late 1971.
