= Lonely Side of the City =

Studio album by The American Breed
- Released: 1968
- Recorded: 1968
- Studio: Universal Recording Corporation, Chicago, Illinois; Mira Sound Studios, New York City, New York
- Genre: Pop, rock
- Length: 29:38
- Label: Acta
- Producer: The American Breed, Bill Traut, Skeet Bushor

The American Breed chronology
Pumpkin, Powder, Scarlet & Green (1968)	Lonely Side of the City (1968)

Professional ratings
Review scores
Source	Rating
Allmusic	2.5/5 stars

Lonely Side of the City is the fourth and final studio album by the 1960s soul and pop group The American Breed, released in the fall of 1968. For their last album, the group decided to move more towards a soft rock approach. However, the group had all but fallen out of favor with the music public, and the album failed miserably. "Walls" was the only single released from the album, and, after releasing several more non-album singles, including the last official American Breed single, "Can't Make It Without You" (1970), the group officially disbanded, and later reorganized as soul/funk band Rufus.

== Track listing ==
No.	Title	Songwriter(s)	Length
1.	"Always You"	Tony Asher, Roger Nichols	2:12
2.	"Love is Just a State of Mind"	Al Ciner	2:43
3.	"New Games to Play"	Peter Andreoli, Ritchie Cordell, Vini Poncia	2:21
4.	"Walls"	Gary Loizzo	2:30
5.	"I've Got to Get You Off My Mind"	Gary Loizzo	2:21
6.	"To Put Up With You"	Paul Williams, Roger Nichols	2:30
7.	"Another Bad Morning"	Jerry Harris, Paul Kaufman	2:55
8.	"What Can You Do When You're Lonely"	Al Ciner	3:10
9.	"River of No Regrets"	Chuck Colbert	3:11
10.	"Partners in Life"	Bill Carr, Tony Powers	3:06
11.	"Out in the Cold Again"	Dick Monda, Keith Colley	2:39
Total length:			29:38

== Personnel ==
=== The American Breed ===
- Gary Loizzo – lead vocals, lead guitar, organ
- Chuck Colbert – bass
- Al Ciner – twelve string guitar
- Lee Graziano – drums, trumpet

=== Technical ===
- Bill Traut, Skeet Bushor, The American Breed – producers
- Eddie Higgins, Bob Schiff, Jim Vincent – assistant producers
- Jerry DeClercq – engineer
- Christopher Whorf – art direction
- Susan McCartney – photography
