= Hi Ho Silver Lining =

1967 single by Jeff Beck

- Danish release picture sleeve

Single by the Attack
- B-side: "Any More Than I Do"
- Released: March 1967
- Label: Decca: F 12578
- Songwriters: Scott English; Larry Weiss
- Producer: Mark Wildey

"Hi Ho Silver Lining" is a rock song, written by the American songwriters Scott English and Larry Weiss and first released as a single in March 1967 by English band the Attack, then a few days later by Jeff Beck. The Attack's version failed to chart, while Beck's recording reached the top 20 of the singles chart in his native Britain in both 1967 and 1972, becoming his biggest solo hit. Beck's single failed to crack the Billboard Hot 100 in the United States, however.

The song is popular with fans of numerous football clubs in the United Kingdom, including Aston Villa, QPR, Newport County, Scunthorpe United, Sheffield Wednesday, and Wolverhampton Wanderers, where it is often chanted by spectators. During the chorus, the words 'silver lining' are usually replaced with the name of the football club in question.

== Background ==
Songwriters English and Weiss started writing a song together, with a chorus of "Hi ho silver lining", but no verses. When producer Mickie Most heard their early version, he suggested that it would be a hit and persuaded English to complete the lyrics. According to writer and musician Bob Stanley, English wanted to record a finished version of the song himself, so decided to deter Most by writing "the most unusable, stupid lyric he could think up, about flies in pea soup and beach umbrellas". To English's chagrin, Most liked the song, and had Jeff Beck record it.

== Jeff Beck version ==
"Hi Ho Silver Lining"
- Netherlands-only cover

Single by Jeff Beck
- B-side: "Beck's Bolero"
- Released: 10 March 1967
- Recorded: 19 January 1967
- Studio: De Lane Lea Studios, London
- Genre: Psychedelic pop; bubblegum pop
- Length: 2:53
- Label: Columbia: DB 8151
- Songwriters: Scott English; Larry Weiss
- Producer: Mickie Most

Jeff Beck singles chronology
"Hi Ho Silver Lining" / "Beck's Bolero" (1967)	"Tallyman" / "Rock My Plimsoul" (1967)

Official audio
- "Hi Ho Silver Lining" on YouTube

In May 1967, Beck's version peaked at No. 14 (for three consecutive weeks) on the UK Singles Chart during a then lengthy 14-week run. The single spent a further 11 weeks on the chart when reissued in the autumn of 1972, peaking at No. 17 (for three consecutive weeks) in December. In the U.S., Beck's single (released as "Hi-Ho Silver") peaked at No. 123 in May 1967. The song was not included on Beck's album Truth when first released in 1968, but featured as a bonus track on the 2006 reissue.

In 1983, in an all-star jam with Steve Winwood and Simon Phillips, Beck performed "Hi Ho Silver Lining" live at the ARMS Charity Concert, a charity benefit show for multiple sclerosis, at London's Royal Albert Hall. The song was resurrected for the Together and Apart Japanese and U.S. tours with Eric Clapton in 2009 and 2010. According to Kate Mossman, writing in the New Statesman, Beck "has likened 'Hi Ho Silver Lining' to having a pink toilet seat hung around your neck for the rest of your life."

=== Formats and track listings ===
1967 7" single (UK/Holland: Columbia DB 8151, New Zealand: Columbia DNZ 10497, Portugal: Columbia 8E 006-93925)

- A. "Hi Ho Silver Lining" (English, Weiss) – 2:53
- B. "Beck's Bolero" (Page) – 2:52

=== Charts ===
Chart (1967)	Peak position
Australia (Go-Set)	25
Ireland (IRMA)	17
Netherlands (Dutch Top 40)	12
Netherlands (Single Top 100)	12
New Zealand (Listener)	4
UK (Disc & Music Echo)	15
UK (Melody Maker)	12
UK (New Musical Express)	23
UK Singles (OCC)	14
US Billboard Bubbling Under Hot 100	23

=== Personnel ===
- Jeff Beck – guitars, vocals
- John Paul Jones – bass guitar
- Clem Cattini – drums
- Rod Stewart – backing vocals
- Mickie Most – producer
