= Bend Me, Shape Me =

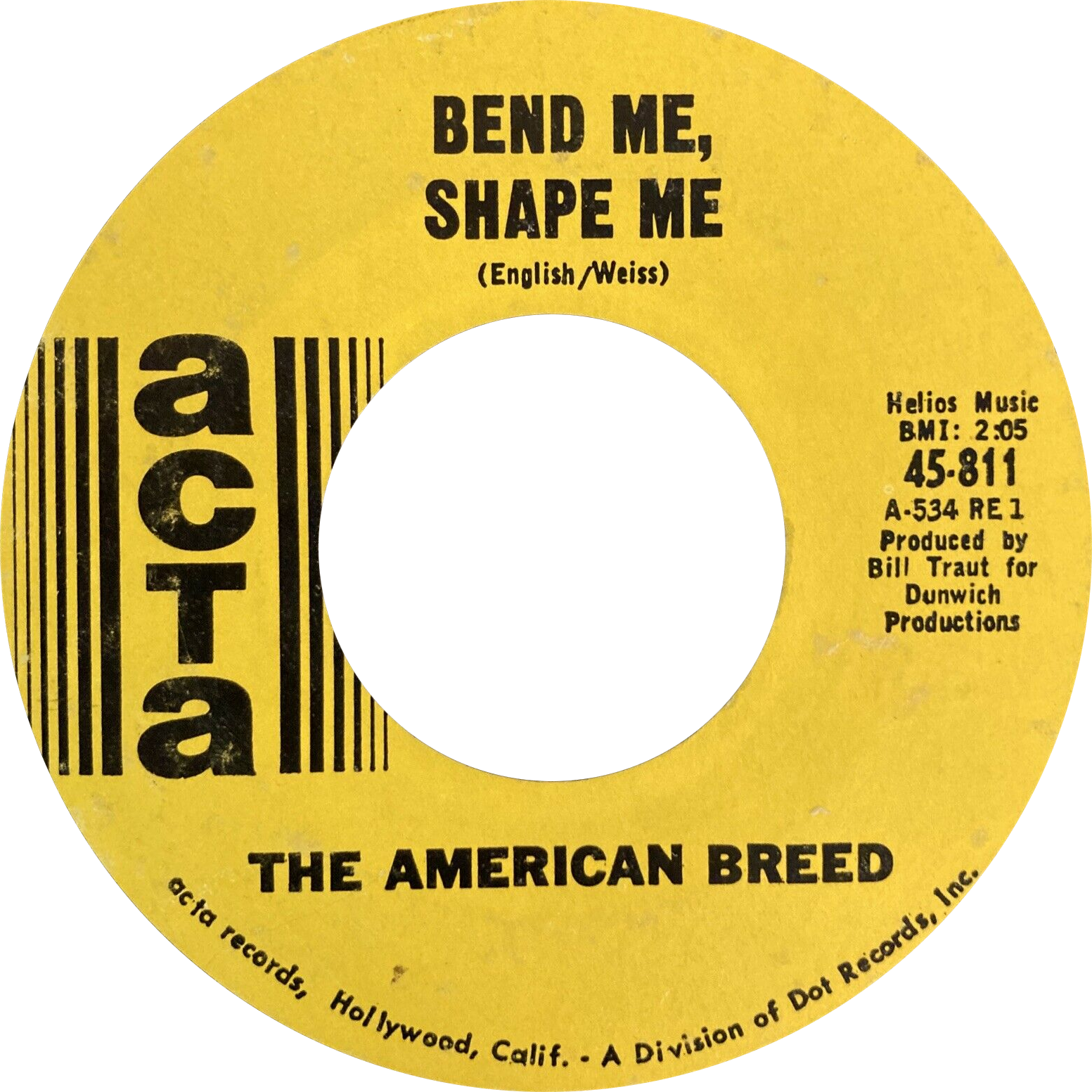
- One of side-A labels of US single

Single by The American Breed

from the album Bend Me, Shape Me
- B-side: "Mindrocker"
- Released: December 1967
- Genre: Bubblegum pop
- Length: 2:05 (single version); 2:25 (album version)
- Label: Acta 811
- Songwriters: Scott English, Larry Weiss
- Producer: Bill Traut

The American Breed singles chronology
"Don't Forget About Me" (1967)	"Bend Me, Shape Me" (1967)	"Green Light" (1968)

"Bend Me, Shape Me" is a song written by Scott English and Larry Weiss. It was first recorded by the Outsiders as a track on their album In in 1966. The best-known version in the US is the 1967 single released by the American Breed that peaked at No. 5 on the US Billboard Hot 100 in early 1968, No. 3 in South Africa, and No. 24 on the UK Singles Chart.

The American Breed's 2:05 single mix of this song was sped up during mastering for release, while the widely available original 2:25 version was done at a normal speed. The following year, The American Breed released their last single, "Anyway That You Want Me", which borrowed its title phrase from "Bend Me, Shape Me". Co-songwriter Scott English later went on to write and sing "Brandy", which Barry Manilow later covered as his 1974 breakout hit "Mandy".

A video was also produced. The band members are seen working out in a gym and performing on stage.

== Chart history ==
=== Weekly charts ===
Chart (1967–1968)	Peak position
Australia (Go-Set)	33
Austria (Ö3 Austria Top 40)	11
Belgium (Ultratop 50 Flanders)	12
Belgium (Ultratop 50 Wallonia)	16
Canada Top Singles (RPM)	7
Netherlands (Single Top 100)	8
New Zealand (Listener)	1
South Africa (Springbok)	3
UK Singles (OCC)	24
U.S. Billboard Hot 100	5
U.S. Cash Box Top 100	3
West Germany (GfK)	9

=== Year-end charts ===
Chart (1968)	Rank
Canada	48
U.S. Billboard Hot 100	98
U.S. Cash Box	25

== Cover versions ==
There have been many other recordings of "Bend Me, Shape Me". The first version was released by The Models in 1966 on the MGM label. Other notables include one by Amen Corner with slightly altered lyrics, which reached No. 3 in the UK Singles Chart in 1968. It also reached number 9 on the New Zealand Listener charts. There was also a hit disco single on Ariola/Hansa by Austrian singer Gilla in 1978, which she also performed in a medley with Boney M.

== See also ==
- List of 1960s one-hit wonders in the United States
