= The American Breed (album) =

Studio album by The American Breed
- Released: 1967
- Recorded: 1967
- Studio: Universal Recording Corporation, Chicago, Illinois
- Genre: Pop, rock
- Length: 30:25
- Label: Acta
- Producer: Bill Traut

The American Breed chronology
The American Breed (1967)	Bend Me, Shape Me (1968)

Professional ratings
Review scores
Source	Rating
Allmusic	2.5/5 stars

The American Breed is the self-titled debut album by the 1960s jazz-rock group The American Breed, released in the fall of 1967.

== Overview ==
Nine of the eleven tracks were cover songs, only "Same Old Thing" and "Short Skirts" were originals. The album spawned three hit singles: "I Don't Think You Know Me", "Don't Forget About Me", and their first major hit, "Step Out of Your Mind" (#24)

== Track listing ==
No.	Title	Writer(s)	Length
1.	"Step Out of Your Mind"	Al Gorgoni, Chip Taylor	2:30
2.	"Knock on Wood"	Steve Cropper, Eddie Floyd	3:35
3.	"We've Gotta Get Out of This Place"	Barry Mann, Cynthia Weil	3:23
4.	"Same Old Thing"	Chuck Colbert, Gary Loizzo	2:22
5.	"Lipstick Traces"	Naomi Neville	2:19
6.	"Don't Forget About Me"	Gerry Goffin, Carole King	2:35
7.	"High Heel Sneakers"	Robert Higgenbotham	2:57
8.	"My Girl"	Smokey Robinson, Ronald White	3:00
9.	"Short Skirts"	Colbert, Loizzo	2:27
10.	"I Don't Think You Know Me"	Goffin, King	2:39
11.	"Uptight (Everything's Alright)"	Henry Cosby, Sylvia Moy, Stevie Wonder	2:38

== Personnel ==
=== The American Breed ===
- Gary Loizzo – lead vocals, lead guitar, organ
- Chuck Colbert – bass
- Al Ciner – twelve string guitar
- Lee Graziano – drums, trumpet

=== Technical ===
- Bill Traut – producer
- Eddie Higgins – arranger
- Jerry DeClercq – engineer
