= The American Breed =

American music group

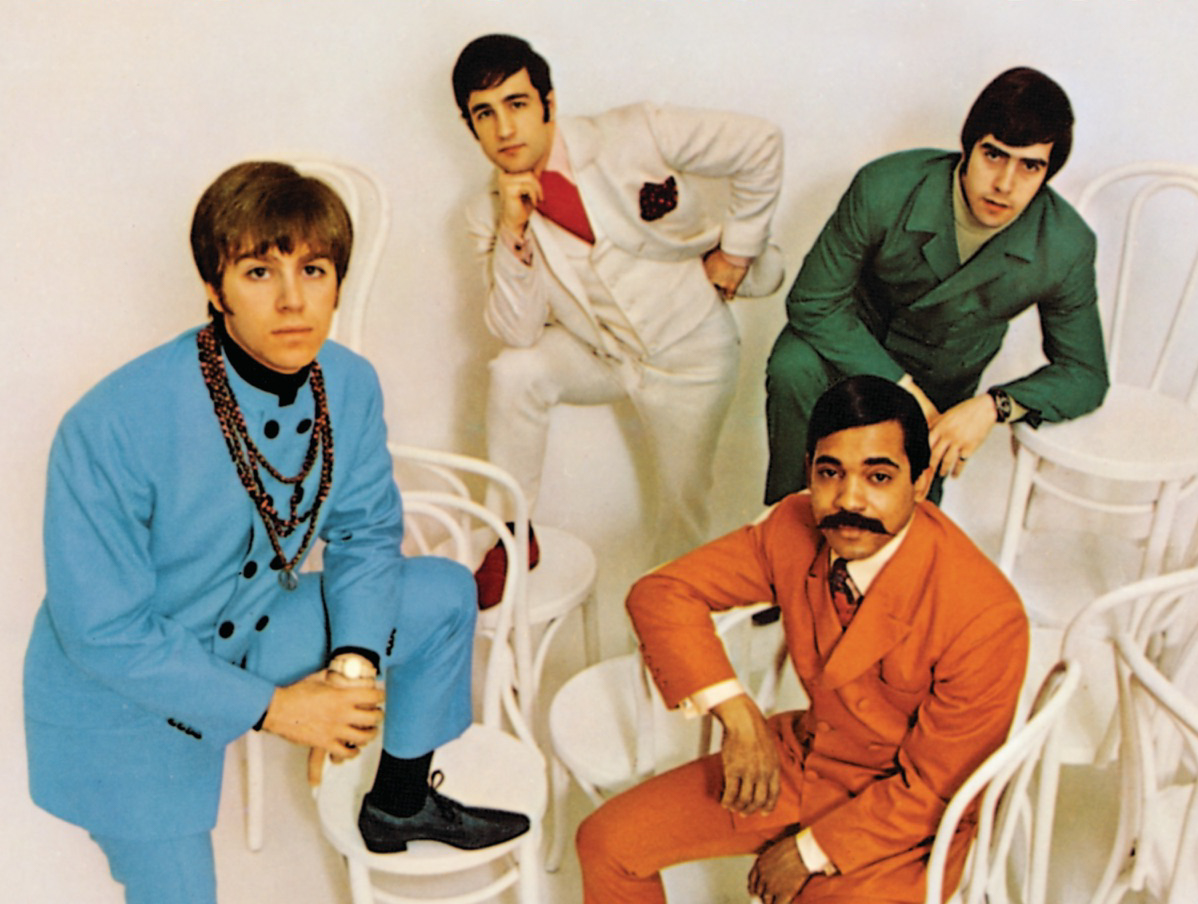
- The American Breed in 1968. L to R: Gary Loizzo, Lee Graziano, Chuck Colbert, Al Ciner

Background information
- Origin: Brookfield, Illinois, United States
- Genres: Rock
- Years active: 1967–1970
- Past members: Gary Loizzo; Al Ciner; Chuck Colbert; Lee Graziano; Kevin Murphy

The American Breed were an American rock band from Chicago in the 1960s. The band was originally called Gary & The Knight Lites before adopting the name The American Breed in 1967. The band had a number of charting songs in 1967–68, the best-known of which was "Bend Me, Shape Me". The band broke up in 1970, and members went on to form Rufus after the split.

== History ==
The American Breed originated as a group formed in 1963 by Gary Loizzo in Cicero, Illinois, United States, called Gary & The Knight Lites. Gary & The Knight Lites was influenced by The Everly Brothers and rhythm & blues songs, and they were joined in their first recording session by Charles "Chuck" Colbert whose father owned the recording studio. Songs they recorded included "I'm Glad She's Mine", and "Will You Go Steady". Other releases included "I Don't Need Your Help" and "I Can't Love You Anymore". They also recorded "One, Two, Boogaloo" as The Light Nites. The original members of the group included Gary Loizzo (vocals and guitar), Charles "Chuck" Colbert, Jr. (bass guitar and vocals), Al Ciner (guitar and vocals) and Jim Michalak (drums). In 1965 local drummer Lee Graziano was asked to substitute for Michalak, initially for just a weekend, while the latter was in Las Vegas; however, after Michalak did not return for the two subsequent weekends, Graziano continued to fill the drummer role and ultimately became Michalak's permanent replacement, completing what would become the classic American Breed line-up. Meanwhile, the group would record until 1966 before becoming The American Breed by early 1967.

On January 20, 1967 a freak snow storm that dumped twenty inches on Chicago changed the fate of Gary & The Knight Lites when Kenny Myers, former Senior Vice President of Mercury Records, found himself stranded and met with the Breed's producer Bill Traut in his studio at Universal Recording. After Traut played Myers some of the band's tapes, Myers was impressed enough to sign them to his new record label, Acta (a subsidiary of Dot Records, itself owned by Paramount Pictures, whose record holdings later evolved into the Famous Music Group) and suggested they change their name. "They told us Gary and the Knight Lites sounded a little dated", Loizzo told Chicago Tribune in 1994. "So we put a bunch of names in a hat and pulled out American Breed". The band's first single was "I Don't Think You Know Me", written by Carole King and Gerry Goffin.

The American Breed enjoyed its greatest success in 1967 and 1968 when five of their singles reached the charts. The first to chart was "Step Out of Your Mind", which reached No. 24 in Billboard Hot 100 in July 1967. The success allowed the group, originally signed for singles, to make albums and quit their daytime gigs to pursue music full-time. The band's biggest success was "Bend Me, Shape Me", which reached No. 5 on the U.S. Billboard Hot 100 chart in 1968. The song, written by Scott English and Larry Weiss, had previously been recorded by an all-female band known as the Models and was also a hit on the UK Singles Chart for the British group Amen Corner. It had also been recorded by The Outsiders after they had reached the top ten with "Time Won't Let Me" in 1966. Contributing to the success of the American Breed's version of "Bend Me, Shape Me" was the arrangement of the song by the band's producer, Bill Traut, who added horns among other changes.

The group appeared on the 16 December 1967 episode of the television show American Bandstand along with Pink Floyd. And "Bend Me, Shape Me" went on to sell over one million copies and was awarded a gold disc. It also peaked at No. 24 in the UK Singles Chart, and No. 9 in the German charts. Other hit songs included "Green Light".

The band also found themselves in high demand in the lucrative radio jingles market, recording commercials for Coca-Cola, the United States Navy, and Bell Telephone, among others. Their television commercial for American Airlines ("Fly the American Way") was also a big success in the top twenty TV markets and their songs were also featured on the soundtrack to the films No Way to Treat a Lady (1968) and The Brain (1969).

In 1968 the band appeared three times on American Bandstand and later that same year, Kevin Murphy joined as keyboardist and the band briefly altered the name to "THE American BREED" before shortening to "The Breed". Their next single, "Keep the Faith", failed to make the charts and singer Paulette McWilliams was added in 1969 in a move towards a more R&B funk sound on their next single "Hunky Funky", which "bubbled under" at No. 107. But the band was for all intents and purposes finished by then, with Colbert, Graziano, Murphy and McWilliams breaking off to form a new group, Grip, in November 1969. Grip eventually became Smoke, then Ask Rufus (eventually abbreviating to Rufus) with guitarist Ciner rejoining the others.

Loizzo briefly tried to keep the name afloat with new members Bill Jordan (vocals, percussion), Greg Owen (keyboards), Greg Biela (bass), Glenn Rupp (guitar), Gary Wisner (guitar) and Maria LaRusso (drums). And in 1970, one last single, "Can't Make It Without You", went nowhere. Biela (later with Heartsfield) and Larusso were replaced respectively during 1970 by Bruce Gordon and Ron Kaplan, but this new Breed lineup splintered after the failure of the latest single and Loizzo's reluctance to tour or record much. He put out a solo album under the moniker of Uncle Willard before pursuing a career as a recording engineer in his own recording studio, Pumpkin, where he worked on producing commercials and other groups, eventually receiving a Grammy nomination for his work with Styx.

The four members of The American Breed (Ciner, Loizzo, Colbert and Graziano) briefly reunited in 1986 and recorded the album Once Again, featuring a new version of "Bend Me, Shape Me".

A compilation album, Bend Me, Shape Me: The Best of the American Breed, was released in 1994. "Bend Me, Shape Me" continues to receive airplay on oldies radio stations.

After that first regrouping in 1986, the band continued for a time to make periodic reunion appearances at shows and fairs, mostly in and around their native Chicago.

Their lead singer, Gary Loizzo, died of pancreatic cancer on January 16, 2016, aged 70.

In March 2021, after working on the project since 2015, Cobert, Graziano and Ciner, joined by bassist/vocalist/producer Tim Burton and others released a new album available via online streaming only, Epiphany.

== Personnel ==
- Gary Loizzo – vocals, guitar, keyboards (August 16, 1945 – January 16, 2016)
- Al Ciner – guitar, vocals (born May 14, 1947, Chicago)
- Charles "Chuck" Colbert – bass, vocals (born August 30, 1939, Chicago)
- Jim Michalak – drums {"Gary & The Knight Lites"} (October 29, 1941 – December 21, 2017)
- Lee Graziano – {"The American Breed"} drums, trumpet, vocals (born November 9, 1943, Chicago)
- Kevin Murphy - keyboards

== Discography ==
=== Albums ===
Year	Album	Billboard 200	Record Label
1967	The American Breed	–	Acta Records
1968	Bend Me, Shape Me	99	Acta Records
1968	Pumpkin, Powder, Scarlet & Green	–	Acta Records
1968	Lonely Side of the City	–	Acta Records
1986	Once Again	–	ABM Records
2021	Epiphany	–	DistroKid

=== Singles ===
Year	Title	US	Can	UK	Record Label	B-side	Album
1967	"Ï Don't Think You Know Me"	—	—	—	Acta Records	"Give Two Young Lovers a Chance"	The American Breed
1967	"Step Out of Your Mind"	24	26	—	Acta Records	"Short Skirts"	The American Breed
1967	"Don't Forget About Me"	107	—	—	Acta Records	"Same Old Thing"	The American Breed
1967	"Bend Me, Shape Me"	5	7	24	Acta Records	"Mindrocker"	Bend Me, Shape Me
1968	"Green Light"	39	29	—	Acta Records	"Don't It Make You Cry"	Bend Me, Shape Me
1968	"Ready, Willing and Able"	84	66	—	Acta Records	"Take Me if You Want Me"	Pumpkin, Powder, Scarlet & Green
1968	"Anyway That You Want Me"	88	84	—	Acta Records	"Master of My Fate"	Pumpkin, Powder, Scarlet & Green
1969	"Hunky Funky"	107	—	—	Acta Records	"Enter Her Majesty"	
1969	"Walls"	—	—	—	Acta Records	"Room at the Top"	
