= Eternal Flame (band) =

Dutch rock band

- Origin: Enschede, Netherlands
- Genres: Hard rock
- Years active: 1987–1993; 2003
- Past members: Gerrit Tijhof (vocals, keyboard); André Romita (guitars); Robert Buitink (drums, backing vocals); Harry Pünt (bass)

Eternal Flame is a Dutch hard rock band founded in 1987 in Enschede.

== History ==
The band was founded in 1987 by Gerrit Tijhof (1956, Rijssen) and André Romita. By late 1987 the initial line up was complete, with the addition of Robert Buitink (drums) and Harry Pünt (bass).

The band premiered in concert at De Wippert (Laren) in September 1988.

In 1993, Harry Pünt left the band, replaced by Aldo Quattrocchi. Later that year, the band was split up.

=== Stalingrad ===
Stalingrad

Demo album by Eternal Flame
- Released: 1988
- Recorded: September 1988
- Genre: hard rock
- Length: 20:17

Eternal Flame recorded its first album, Stalingrad on 17 September and 18 September 1988 at R.D.S. Studio in Jubbega, Friesland.

=== Millstone ===
In 1991, the band released their second album, a split album with three other artists. Production was assisted by Gerrit Tijhof (Eternal Flame). The band released three songs on this album. Released by Metal Mustang Media in Hengelo, a label from SMN (Stichting Muziek Nieuws).

== Discography ==
- Stalingrad (1988) Demo tape
  1. Fading 'n Trading – 5:16
  2. On My Way – 3:36
  3. Seven Is Heaven – 4:43
  4. Stalingrad – 6:42
- Harder than a Millstone (1991) CD
  - 13. One and All – 04:59
  - 14. Blind Metal – 05:32
  - 15. Limit of Dreams – 06:04

== Reunion ==
They reunited in 2003 for three reunion concerts featuring their original line-up.
