= Kent R. Brown =

American playwright and academic (died 2020)

Kent R. Brown was an American playwright and director. He was professor emeritus at the University of Arkansas, Fayetteville and former Playwright-In-Residence and adjunct professor of English at Fairfield University in Fairfield, Connecticut.

Brown was the recipient of a Drama-Logue award, a McLaren Comedy Playwriting Festival award, Mill Mountain New Play Competition and Year End Series New Play Festival awards, a Julie Harris/Beverly Hills Theatre Guild award and a Denver Center Theatre US West TheatreFest Award. From 1985 to 1996 he was co-founder and director of the Mt. Sequoyah New Play Retreat in Fayetteville, Arkansas, where he helped develop fifty new works written by playwrights from across the country. His plays are published by Dramatic Publishing Company.

Brown died in Greenville, South Carolina, on December 6, 2020, at age 79.

== Works ==
- Valentines and Killer Chili
- Larry's Favorite Chocolate Cake
- A Trick of the Light
- Ciao, Baby!
- Hope 'n Mercy
- Reduced for Quick Sale
- The View From Sunset Towers
- The Phoenix Dimension
- Lover Boy
- Are We There Yet?
- Floral Fantasy
- Designer Genes
- Gooney Bird Greene and Her True Life Adventures
- The Seduction of Chaos
- Dancing the Box Step
- Welcome to Four Way: The Town That Time Forgot
- Two Beers and a Hook Shot
- The Hound of the Baskervilles: A Comic Thriller Starring Shirley Holmes and Jennie Watson
- Gooney Bird Greene and Her Fabulous Animal Parade
- In the Middle of Nowhere
- American Beauty
