= Ronald Harkai =

American musician

Ronald Harkai (May 26, 1946, in Cleveland, Ohio – December 6, 2022, in Grand Rapids, Michigan), often known by the nickname Ronnie, was a musician best known as the drummer on the top-five single "Time Won't Let Me", by Cleveland-based rock band The Outsiders.

"Time Won't Let Me" was released early 1966 and peaked at #5 in the US. The Outsiders had three other hit singles in 1966 and released a total of four albums in the mid-1960s.

His musical path began in Cleveland the late 1950s in parochial schools and continued into his performing and touring career with several bands originating in the Cleveland area, most notably The Sensations, The Pilgrims, Tom King and the Starfires and The Outsiders.

Harkai was a recording engineer, producer and consultant.
