= The Outsiders (American band) =

American rock and roll band

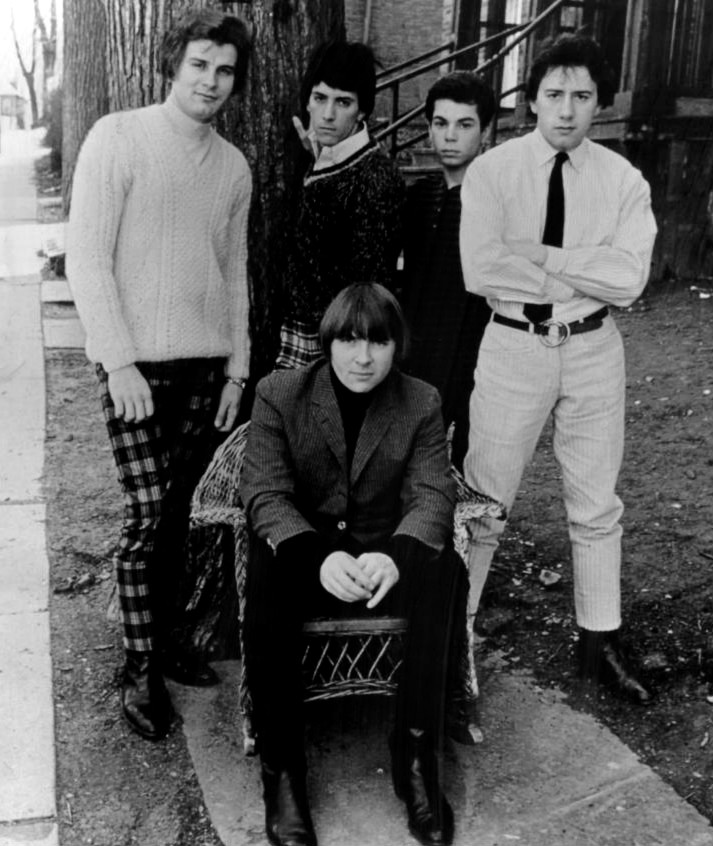
- The Outsiders in 1967. Tom King (seated), and standing left to right: Mert Madsen, Sonny Geraci, Ricky Baker, and Bill Bruno.

Background information
- Origin: Cleveland, Ohio, U.S.
- Genres: Rock and roll; garage rock; blue-eyed soul
- Years active: 1965–1970; 1991
- Label: Capitol
- Spinoff of: The Starfires
- Past members: Tom King (died 2011); Sonny Geraci (died 2017); Mert Madsen; Al Austin; Ronnie Harkai (died 2022); Denny Benson; Rick Biagiola (Rick Baker); Bill Bruno; Richard Kriss; Jim Fox; Walter Nims; Rob Mitchell; Nick D'Amico; Mike Geraci; Evan Vanguard; Tommy Baker; Richard D'Amato; Pete Shelton; Richie D'Angelo; Dan Donavan; Mike Schillinger; Joe Prodrasky; Mario Vinciguerra; Ron Durback; Ricky Biagiola; Jimmy Aschenbener; Rik Storm; Rob Mitchell
- Website: theoutsidersusalive.com theoutsiders.rocks

The Outsiders were an American rock and roll band from Cleveland, Ohio, that was founded and led by guitarist Tom King. The band released the hit single "Time Won't Let Me" in early 1966, which peaked at No. 5 in the US in April. The band had three other Hot 100 top 40 hit singles in 1966, but none on the Hot 100 afterwards, and released a total of four albums in the mid-1960s.

Allmusic described the act's style: "Part of the secret behind the Outsiders' musical success lay in the group's embellishments [with horns and strings], which slotted in perfectly with their basic three- or four-piece instrumental sound ... however bold and ambitious they got, one never lost the sense of a hard, solid band sound at the core."

== Career ==
=== Debut single ===
The Outsiders were a continuation of the Starfires: Tom King, Sonny Geraci, Mert Madsen, Richard Kriss, Al Austin and Howard Blank (who was replaced by Ronnie Harkai before the recording of "Time Won't Let Me"). The name was changed to The Outsiders after the recording of "Time Won't Let Me". A total of five former Starfires were members of the Outsiders at one time or another.

The band was signed to Capitol Records on the strength of their late 1965 recording of "Time Won't Let Me" (written by King and his brother-in-law, Chet Kelley), leaving a local recording label headed by King's uncle, Patrick Connelly (Pama Records). The band's name was changed in early 1966. Reasons for the name change are unclear, although most sources state that it was at the insistence of their new record label. One popular story about the new name was that King and Kelley had become "outsiders" within the family as a result of the label shift. "Time Won't Let Me" sold over one million copies and was awarded a gold disc.

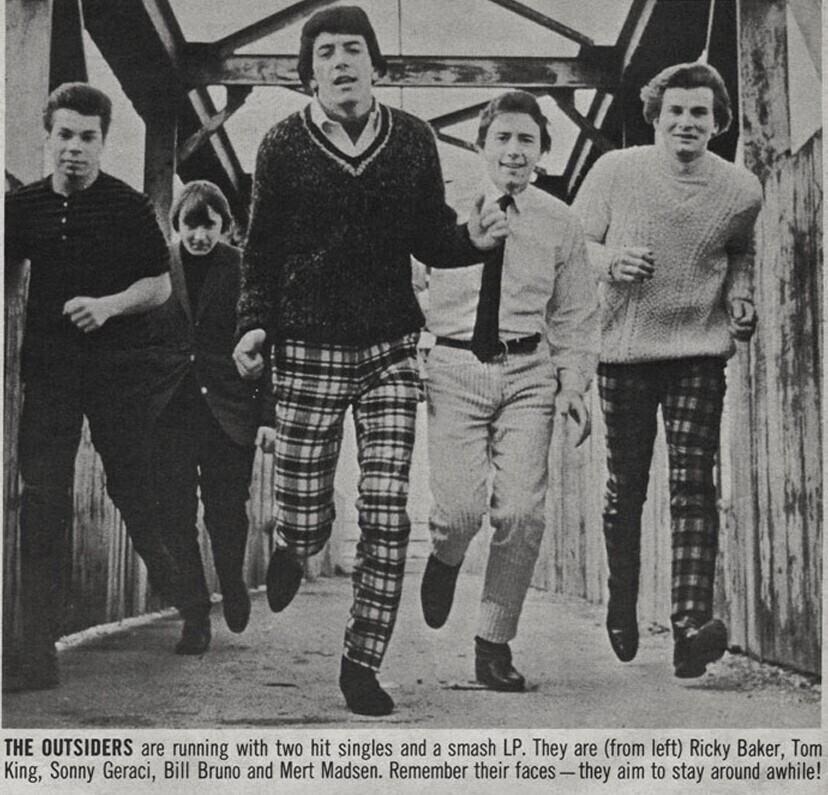
The Outsiders, featured on the June 18, 1966 issue of KRLA Beat

The Outsiders had a built-in advantage over the numerous American bands that formed in the wake of the British Invasion. Rather than being neophytes, The Starfires had been a very active rhythm and blues band in the Cleveland scene since 1958, often playing six shows a week. Most of the band's original songs were written by King and Kelley, although another songwriter, Bob Turek, was working with the band by 1967. King and Kelley proved to be a formidable songwriting team, and the band was also adept at handling covers of R&B standards. King also headed the band's horn section and served as the arranger and sometime producer.

=== Touring ===
The Outsiders promoted their hit single with about a year of nationwide touring, as "Time Won't Let Me" stayed on the national charts for 15 weeks. Although their music was released in other countries, the band never toured overseas. The band first toured with Paul Revere and the Raiders and then with Chad and Jeremy. The Outsiders were part of a six-week tour of one-night stands headed by Gene Pitney, and which included seven or eight other acts. Afterwards, the Outsiders joined a four-week tour with several garage rock and psychedelic rock bands, as recalled by Geraci: "[W]e did a tour after Pitney with the McCoys, ourselves and ? and the Mysterians, the Shadows of Knight and a group from the west coast called the Seeds...A guy called Pete Shelton from England joined us on bass for this tour. Pete stayed with us until we could find a replacement...he then stayed on for a short while as 'Tour Manager'. There were five rock bands. Was that a crazy tour!"

=== Later records ===
There were several line-up changes over the years, with King (rhythm guitar) and Madsen (bass, harmonica) from the original Starfires along with Geraci (vocals) forming the core of the band in the early years. After Harkai left to join the Air Force, Denny Benson briefly handled drumming duties for the band. Tom King then invited Ricky Biagiola to join the band (a.k.a. Ricky Baker, a stage name given to him because the managers felt Biagiola was too ethnic). With Harkai having departed prior to sessions for the first album, Time Won't Let Me, former Starfire Jimmy Fox (who had left the earlier band to go to college) was brought in by King to be the drummer for the remaining tracks, which included another King/Kelley-written top 40 hit, the ballad "Girl in Love". Following these sessions, Fox decided to return to the music world and founded a band in 1966 called the James Gang that would enjoy considerable success over the coming decade. Ronnie Harkai returned to record cuts on the second album Album Number 2, along with Ricky Biagiola. Ricky Biagiola toured with the band for almost 3 years, and was part of 4 LPs and several singles released, until returning home to Cleveland to continue his education.

A cover of the Isley Brothers' "Respectable" from Album No. 2 reached No. 15 in early September 1966. The Outsiders had performed "Respectable" during their earlier years as the Starfires.

A single by outside songwriters, "Help Me Girl" (from In), had to compete with a version released in the same time period by the Animals. By some accounts, the Animals had already recorded their version, although they assured The Outsiders that they had not. The Outsiders' version peaked at No. 37. They recorded another track by the same songwriters for their third album, but it was not released as a single. The song, "Bend Me, Shape Me", became a major hit on both sides of the Atlantic in early 1968 when it was covered by the American Breed in the US and by Amen Corner in the UK.

After Mert Madsen left the Outsiders to get married, two other ex-Starfires, Walter Nims and Richard D'Amato, plus Richie D'Angelo on drums joined the band. Other session players were brought in to beef up the band's recordings, among them drummer Hal Blaine and bassist Carol Kaye of the Wrecking Crew; also, some recordings were produced by Richard Delvy, who had worked with Sonny and Cher. Joe Kelley (no relation to Chet Kelley), lead guitarist for the Shadows of Knight, made a guest appearance on the 1967 single "Gotta Leave Us Alone".

Capitol gave tentative approval for a fourth album, which was to have been named after this single, Leave Us Alone. However, the project was abandoned midway through, in favor of a faux live album called Happening Live! where crowd noises plus song and band member introductions by Sonny Geraci were dubbed onto stripped-down studio renditions of older recordings, along with some recordings by the new line-up. Not long thereafter, the group disbanded.

The Outsiders were one of the early white American soul-influenced bands. The band's "Lonely Man" was bootlegged by a small British label and released in the UK, miscredited to Northern soul band the Detroit Shakers and retitled "Help Me Find My Way". The sound they first created, combining Mersey rock and Motown, can be felt in the later hits of the Buckinghams and Chicago. Jim Guercio, who would manage both of these Chicago groups, had toured with the Outsiders as a musician on the Gene Pitney Caravan.

== Post-breakup ==
In 1970, Sonny Geraci organized a new band in Los Angeles that included Walter Nims and Nick D'Amico, and released a single as "The Outsiders featuring Sonny Geraci" on the Bell label; commercial copies showed the "O" in OUTSIDERS as a peace symbol. Meanwhile, King was still heading a band called the Outsiders back in Cleveland; and this band released a single as "The Outsiders (featuring Jon Simonell)", Simonell being Geraci's replacement as lead singer. King won a lawsuit in 1970 about the ownership of the name. Geraci's band name was then changed to Climax and scored a No. 3 hit in 1972 with Nims' "Precious and Few".

Geraci left the music industry in 1980 and spent about five years in sales in his family's home improvement business. In about 1985, he began appearing with several other mid-1960s bands as "oldies" acts and continued to appear in live concerts. Along the way, he released a handful of solo CDs. Despite the earlier lawsuit about the name, Sonny Geraci began touring in 2007 as "Sonny Geraci and the Outsiders". In April 2012 Geraci suffered a brain aneurysm (specifically, a cerebral arteriovenous malformation), requiring intensive care.

The most recent album by the Outsiders, 30 Years Live, was released in 1996 and reissued in 2006; only two of the original members, King and Nims, were on board. The performances were taken from two live concerts in 1991 in Cleveland, Ohio, and Las Vegas, Nevada.

King died aged 68, on April 23, 2011, in a Wickliffe, Ohio nursing home. He had suffered from multiple health problems and had been at the Wickliffe Country Place nursing home since he fell and injured himself in August. King's death was announced by Kevin King, one of his sons, and confirmed by the nursing home.

Geraci died on February 5, 2017, at the age of 70.

== Legacy ==
"Time Won't Let Me" is still prominent on oldies radio playlists, but this has created an image of the Outsiders as a "one hit wonder" band. The song was also included on the box set inspired by the classic garage rock compilation album Nuggets: Original Artyfacts from the First Psychedelic Era, 1965–1968. Another song, "I'm Not Trying to Hurt You", was included in volume 9 of the Pebbles series. Bill Scheft's novel about a garage rock band being rediscovered by record collectors and then attempting to recapture their glory days as the bandmembers approached the age of 50 was called Time Won't Let Me.

== Reissues ==
The original Outsiders albums have never been individually reissued as CDs. Rhino Records released Best of the Outsiders in 1985, while Collectables Records has also released a Capitol Collectors Series retrospective album on CD.

== Band members ==
=== The Starfires/The Outsiders 1965 ("Time Won't Let Me" single) ===
- Sonny Geraci, lead vocals
- John Madrid, trumpet
- Al Austin, lead guitar
- Gayle Guhde, keyboards
- Tom King, rhythm guitar, backing vocals, tenor saxophone
- Mert Madsen, bass, harmonica
- Ronnie Harkai, drums

=== The Outsiders ===
- Tom King, rhythm guitar, tenor saxophone, vocals
- Sonny Geraci, lead vocals
- Mert Madsen, bass guitar, harmonica
- Bill Bruno, lead guitar
- Rick Biagiola, drums

=== The Outsiders (1967 Live album) ===
- Tom King, rhythm guitar, tenor saxophone, vocals
- Sonny Geraci, lead vocals
- Richard D'Amato, bass guitar
- Walter Nims, lead guitar
- Ricky Biagiola, drums
- Craig Gephart, lead vocals for a short period after Sonny Geraci quit

=== The Outsiders (1991 30 Years Live album) ===
- Tom King, guitar, background vocals
- Walter Nims, guitar, background vocals
- Rob Mitchell, vocals, bass guitar
- Eddie Soto, vocals
- Ted Sikora, guitar, background vocals
- Dave Hershy, horns
- Joe Potnicky, keyboards
- Dan King, drums
- Rusty Schmidt, vocals
- Nick Farcas, keyboards

=== The Outsiders (2022 to Present) ===
- Ricky Biagiolia, drums, vocals
- Jimmy Aschenbener, vocals, guitar
- Rob Mitchell, vocals, bass guitar
- Rik Storm, vocals, multi-instrumentalist

== Discography ==
=== Singles ===
Release date	Titles Both sides from same album except where indicated	Record label	Chart positions			Album
Release date	Titles Both sides from same album except where indicated	Record label	US Billboard	US Cashbox	CAN RPM	Album
February 1966	"Time Won't Let Me" b/w "Was It Really Real"	Capitol 5573	5	6	5	Time Won't Let Me
May 1966	"Girl In Love" b/w "What Makes You So Bad, You Weren't Brought Up That Way"	Capitol 5646	21	24	12	Time Won't Let Me
August 1966	"Respectable" b/w "Lost In My World"	Capitol 5701	15	13	7	Album #2
October 1966	"Help Me Girl" b/w "You Gotta Look"	Capitol 5759	37	40	25	In
March 1967	"I'll Give You Time (To Think It Over)" b/w "I'm Not Trying To Hurt You"	Capitol 5843	118	110	-	In
May 1967	"Gotta Leave Us Alone" b/w "I Just Can't See You Anymore"	Capitol 5892	121	131	-	Leave Us Alone (cancelled)
July 1967	"I'll See You In The Summertime" b/w "And Now You Want My Sympathy"; Both tracks possibly to have been included on the cancelled Leave Us Alone album	Capitol 5955	-	117	-	Non-album tracks
December 1967	"Little Bit Of Lovin'" b/w "I Will Love You" (from Album #2)	Capitol 2055	117	-	-	Non-album tracks
June 1968	"We Ain't Gonna Make It" b/w "Oh How It Hurts" (from Album #2)	Capitol 2216	-	-	-	Non-album tracks
January 1969	"Loving You" b/w "Think I'm Falling"; Sonny Geraci solo single	Capitol 2375	-	-	-	Non-album tracks
August 1970	"Tinker Tailor" b/w "You're Not So Pretty"; The Outsiders featuring Jon Simonell	Kapp 2104	-	-	-	Non-album tracks
September 1970	"Changes" b/w "Lost in My World"; The Outsiders featuring Sonny Geraci ...later renamed Climax	Bell 904	107	-	-	Non-album tracks

==== Reissues and releases outside the U.S. ====
- "Time Won't Let Me" b/w "Was It Really Real" – Capitol 5573, (Second pressing on the red/orange target label with target logo)
- "Time Won't Let Me" b/w "Girl In Love" – Capitol Starline 6165 (Released on the red/white, tan and purple label variations)

==== Foreign releases ====
- "Time Won't Let Me" b/w "Was It Really Real" – Capitol #K 23187; rel. 1966 in West Germany, violet label
- "Respectable" b/w "Lost In My World" – Jolly #J-20387; rel. in 1966 in Italy

=== EPs ===
- "Time Won't Let Me" and "Listen People" b/w "Girl In Love" and "Rockin' Robin" – Capitol #EAP4-2501; rel. 1966 in Mexico, 7"
- "Listen People" and "Keep On Running" b/w "Time Won't Let Me" and "Maybe Baby" – Capitol #EAP-4-2501; rel. 1967 in Brazil, 7"
- "Gotta Leave Us Alone" and "I Just Can't See You Anymore" b/w "I'll See You In The Summertime" and "And Now You Want My Sympathy" – Capitol #EAP1-20984; rel. 1967 in Mexico, 7"
- "Keep on Running" and "My Girl" b/w "Time Won't Let Me" and "Was it Really Real" – American #TK-45, black and yellow label; 7"

=== Albums ===
==== Studio albums ====
- Time Won't Let Me – Capitol #T-2501/#ST-2501; rel. 5/1966 (#37)
- Album No. 2 – Capitol #T-2568/#ST-2568; rel. 9/1966 (#90)
- In – Capitol #T-2636/#ST-2636; rel. 1/1967 (Did not chart)
- Leave Us Alone – Capitol (No catalogue number, cancelled before release. However, a tentative album cover slick for this release is shown in the "collage" of The Outsiders' "Capitol Collectors Series" CD booklet)

==== Live albums ====
- Happening Live! – Capitol #T-2745/#ST-2745; rel. 8/1967 (#103)
- 30 Years Live – Collectables; rel. 1996

==== Reissues and releases outside the U.S. ====
- Happening Live! – Capitol #POP 672; rel. 1985 in Mexico
- Time Won't Let Me and Album No. 2 (plus bonus tracks); two-fer CD reissue – Liberty Bell #PCD 4365 (unofficial disc)
- In and Happening Live! (plus bonus tracks); two-fer CD reissue – Liberty Bell #PCD 4366 (unofficial disc)

==== Retrospective albums ====
- Capitol Collectors Series – Capitol; rel. 1991
- Best of the Outsiders – Rhino #RNLP 70132 / #RNC 70132; rel. 1986
- Collectors Series – Collectables; rel. 1996

==== Compilation albums ====
- Time Won't Let Me
1. Nuggets: Original Artyfacts from the First Psychedelic Era, 1965–1968 (box set)
2. Nuggets from Nuggets (CD)
3. Nuggets, Volume 3 (LP)
4. Pride from Cleveland Past (LP)

"Time Won't Let Me" has also been included on many other compilation albums that are aimed at mainstream audiences; Allmusic lists more than 40 such albums.

- I'm Not Trying to Hurt You
1. Pebbles, Volume 9 (LP)
- Lost in My World
1. Nuggets, Volume 4 (LP)
- And Now You Want My Sympathy
1. Psychedelic Archives – USA Garage, Volume 1 (cassette)

== Literature ==
- The Billboard Book of Top 40 Hits, 7th ed. by Joel Whitburn (2000)
