= Precious and Few =

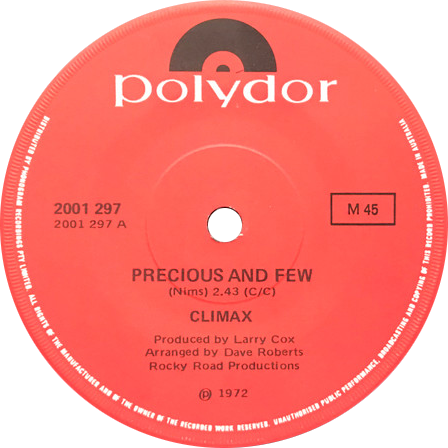
- Side A of the Australian single

Single by Climax

from the album Climax Featuring Sonny Geraci
- B-side: "Park Preserve"
- Released: December 1971
- Recorded: 1971
- Genre: Soft rock; pop
- Length: 2:43
- Label: Carousel/Rocky Road Records
- Songwriter: Walter D. Nims
- Producer: Larry Cox

Climax singles chronology
"Precious and Few" (1971)	"Life and Breath" (1972)

"Precious and Few" is a song recorded by American group Climax which became a major North American hit in early 1972. The song was written by the band's guitarist, Walter D. Nims.

== Background ==
The original recording in 1970 was produced and arranged by Nick D'Amico (Nicola Marcello D'Amico). It was recorded at Sound City Recording Studios in Panorama City, California and engineered by Joseph Leahy. There was never a demo recording before the 1970 recording nor before the 1971 recoding, which rose to #1 in Cash Box on February 26, 1972.

Background voices on Climax's 1972 hit record were arranged by Tom Bähler and sung by Jeanne Sheffield, Debbie Clinger, Mitch Gordon and Tom Bähler.

The hit record was sung by Sonny Geraci.

Nick D'Amico played piano on both the original recording and the version that became a hit.

== Chart performance ==
"Precious and Few" spent three weeks at number three on the U.S. Billboard Hot 100 and hit number one on the Cash Box Top 100. It also reached number six on Canada's RPM 100.

== Charts ==
=== Weekly charts ===
Chart (1971–1972)	Peak position
Australia (Go-Set)	29
Australia (Kent Music Report)	26
Canada RPM 100	6
Canada RPM MOR Playlist	13
US Billboard Hot 100	3
US Easy Listening (Billboard)	6
US Cash Box Top 100	1
US Record World The Singles Chart	1
US Record World The M.O.R. Chart	3

=== Year-end charts ===
Chart (1972)	Rank
Canada	28
US Billboard Hot 100	30
US Easy Listening (Billboard)	48
US Cash Box Top 100	31

== Certifications ==
Region	Certification	Certified units/sales
United States (RIAA)	Gold	1,000,000^{^}
^{^} Shipments figures based on certification alone.

== Cover versions ==
The song has been covered by several artists:

- In 1972 by Andy Williams, the Lettermen, Ray Conniff and Terry Baxter
- In 1973 by Pilita Corrales
- In a Spanish version in 1995 by Barrio Boyzz titled "Entre tú y yo"
- In 1998 by the Company.

== See also ==
- List of 1970s one-hit wonders in the United States
- List of Cash Box Top 100 number-one singles of 1972
