= Time Won't Let Me =

- One of side-A labels of US single

Single by the Outsiders
- B-side: "Was It Really Real"
- Released: January 1966
- Recorded: September 1965
- Studio: Cleveland Recording Company, Cleveland
- Genre: Garage rock
- Length: 3:00
- Label: Capitol
- Songwriters: Tom King and Chet Kelley
- Producer: Tom King

The Outsiders singles chronology
"Time Won't Let Me" (1966)	"Girl in Love" (1966)

"Time Won't Let Me" is a garage rock song that was recorded by the Outsiders in September 1965. The song became a major hit in the United States in 1966, reaching No.5 on the Billboard Hot 100 on the week of April 16 of that year. It is ranked as the 42nd biggest American hit of 1966. In Canada, the song also reached No.5 in the weekly charts.

== History ==
=== Background ===
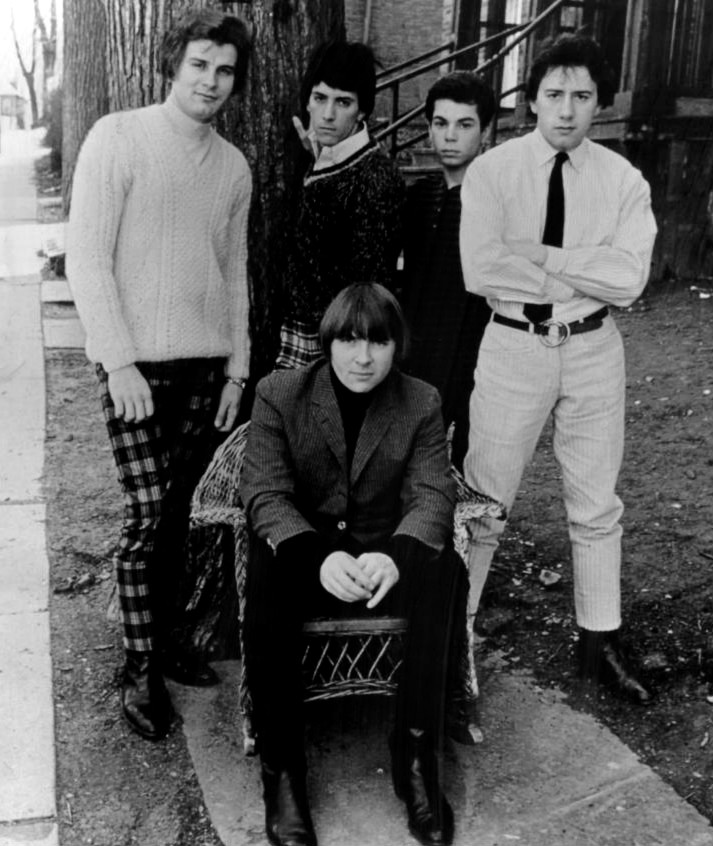
The Outsiders in 1967

In contrast to the numerous American bands that formed in the wake of the British Invasion, the musicians who became the Outsiders had been active in the Cleveland music scene since 1958, when fifteen year old guitarist and saxophonist Tom King founded the band as a rhythm & blues combo called the Starfires.

By early 1965 the band's membership consisted of King on rhythm guitar, Al Austin on lead guitar (later substituted by Bill Bruno), Mert Madsen on bass, and Jim Fox on drums. Later that year, Fox departed for college and was replaced by Ronnie Harkai, who would play drums on "Time Won't Let Me." Around the same time, the band recruited Sonny Geraci to handle the lead vocals.

The group was under contract with Pama Records, which was owned by King's uncle, Patrick Connelly. In late 1965 the band recorded "Time Won't Let Me" locally at Cleveland Recording Company for Pama. Sufficiently impressed upon hearing it, Capitol Records signed the band on the strength of the song, and shortly thereafter King changed the band's name from the Starfires to the Outsiders, possibly at the urging of the new label. One account of the change was that King and Kelley had become "outsiders" within the family as a result of the label switch.

=== Composition ===
The song was composed by the band's guitarist Tom King and Chet Kelley. A simple, catchy, and danceable tune, the basic arrangement is augmented by a horn section, applied in an unobtrusive manner so as not to detract from the band's fundamental sound, which on this occasion features a signature riff from a twelve-string electric guitar. The song also features an electric organ with vibrato, heard in the verses, and a complex counterpoint melody in the other vocals in the coda section, where the scream trumpet is heard before the song's fade.

The lyrics are about pleading to be taken back by a lover after being away. The reason for the separation is not stated, but the object of the singer's desire puts off committing to resuming the relationship as the singer emphasizes that he can wait no longer. Thematically, the lyrics are similar to the 1962 Sam Cooke song "Bring it on Home to Me."

=== Release ===
"Time Won't Let Me" was released as a single on Capitol Records in January 1966 and was backed with "Was it Really Real" on the flipside. King produced the record and, along with Tommy Baker, was instrumental in the horn arrangements. The song went on to become a huge nationwide hit for the group, reaching No.5 on the Billboard Hot 100 during the week of April 16. It sold over one million copies, and was awarded a gold disc—a feat the band would never again be able to match.

In 1966 the Outsiders recorded their debut album for Capitol, Time Won't Let Me, titled after the hit song. Produced by Tom King, the album included five original songs written by King and Kelley. They proved to be a formidable songwriting team, and the band was also adept at handling covers of R&B songs. Drummer Ronnie Harkai departed shortly after the recording of "Time Won't Let Me" to join the Air Force, and Jim Fox returned briefly to fill in, playing on most of the remaining cuts recorded for the album. Following the recording of the album, Bennie Benson became the group's drummer, later to be replaced by Ricky Baker.

The Outsiders promoted their hit single with almost a year of nationwide touring, as "Time Won't Let Me" stayed on the national charts for 15 weeks. The band first toured with Paul Revere and the Raiders and then with Chad and Jeremy, and later were part of a six-week tour of one-night stands headed by Gene Pitney, and which included seven or eight other acts, among them Len Barry, B.J. Thomas, and Bobby Goldsboro. Afterwards, the Outsiders joined a four-week tour with several garage rock and psychedelic rock bands, such as the Seeds and the Shadows of Knight. They also made a national television appearance on Hullabaloo.

== Personnel ==
=== The Outsiders ===
- Sonny Geraci – lead vocals
- Tom King – rhythm guitar, backing vocals
- Al Austin – lead guitar Sunburst Fender Jaguar Guitar
- Mert Madsen – bass guitar, backing vocals arrangements
- Ronnie Harkai – drums

=== Additional session musicians ===
- Gayle Guhde – organ
- Mike Geraci – baritone saxophone
- John Madrid – trumpet
- Tommy Baker – horn arrangements
- Unknown – backing vocals

== Discography ==
=== Single ===
- "Time Won't Let Me" b/w "Was it Really Real" (Capitol 5573, January 1966)

=== Album ===
- Time Won't Let Me (Capitol 1966)

== 1994 cover ==
The Smithereens made a cover for the song in 1994 which was featured as the ending soundtrack of the movie Timecop.
