= Scott English =

American songwriter and record producer (1937–2018)

- Born: Sheldon David English; January 10, 1937; Brooklyn, New York, U.S.
- Died: November 16, 2018 (aged 81); London, England
- Occupations: Songwriter; arranger; record producer
- Employer(s): Warner Brothers, EMI
- Notable work: "Hi Ho Silver Lining", "Brandy", "Bend Me, Shape Me", "Help Me Girl"
- Style: Pop
- Spouses: Jacquiline Tames, Elfie Redburn
- Children: 2

Sheldon David "Scott" English (January 10, 1937 – November 16, 2018) was an American songwriter, arranger and record producer. He is best known as the co-writer of "Brandy" which he wrote with Richard Kerr. The song became a No. 1 hit for Barry Manilow in 1974, with the title changed to "Mandy". English had also released a single of "Brandy" which reached No. 12 on the UK Singles Chart in November 1971, and entered the US charts in March 1972.

== Life and career ==
Scott English was born Sheldon David English on January 10, 1937, in Brooklyn, New York City, to Jewish parents Harold English, a Russian émigré, and Ida English (née Finkelstein).

In 1960, he released his first single, "4,000 Miles Away", on Dot Records. In 1964, English had a regional doo-wop hit called "High on a Hill", written by Frank Cariola and A. Mangravito. "High on a Hill" has consistently been voted an all-time top song on oldies radio stations in the Pittsburgh metropolitan area. It also reached No. 3 in popularity on the San Francisco Bay Area radio charts, and peaked at #4 in Los Angeles (source: KRLA Top 30 Survey, Feb.-Mar. 1964).

With Larry Weiss, he wrote "Bend Me, Shape Me", which became a hit for the Chicago-based band the American Breed, reaching No. 5 on the U.S. Billboard Hot 100 chart in 1968 and also becoming a hit in the UK for Amen Corner. The song had been recorded a year earlier by the Outsiders as an album track on In (1967).

English and Weiss, whom he met through arranger Claus Ogerman, became good friends. Together, they penned "Help Me Girl" (1966), which was a hit for two acts in late 1966: Eric Burdon (solo for Decca, a UK No. 14 hit) and the Outsiders. They also penned Lynne Randell's "Ciao Baby" (1967) and Jeff Beck's hit "Hi Ho Silver Lining", originally recorded by English group the Attack in early 1967.

English produced the song "West Virginia" by the Elves in 1969 (a band later known as Elf) which featured Ronnie James Dio on bass and vocals. He later produced Thin Lizzy's eponymous debut album Thin Lizzy (1971). He co-wrote the song "Words Don't Mean a Thing" with Lynsey de Paul, who released her version of the song on her album Just a Little Time. The song was also featured on the 2008 album Songs from the British Academy, Vol. 1. A Spanish version was released by Cadafal on their album En La Carretera.

In 1998, English was credited as a co-writer with Simon Stirling and Phil Mankiza on the UK entry in the Eurovision Song Contest, "Where Are You?", performed by Imaani. In 2014, English appeared on BBC Radio London's Jo Good Show, debuting new song "Holla" which he wrote for WestWay Beats.

English died in England on November 16, 2018, at the age of 81, from complications of hip surgery.

== Discography ==
=== Studio albums ===
Title	Year/Label
Scott English	Released in 1978 by EMI

=== Singles ===
Title	Year	Peak position				Album
Title	Year	US	AUS	CAN	UK	Album
"4,000 Miles Away"	1960	—	—	—	—	Non-album singles
"High on a Hill"	1964	77	—	—	—	Non-album singles
"Brandy"	1971	91	13	73	12	Non-album singles
"Denver Calling"	1971	—	—	—	—	Non-album singles
"Waterfall Woman"	1971	—	—	—	—	Non-album singles
"Ballad of the Unloved"	1972	—	—	—	—	Non-album singles
"He Was Me He Was You"	1972	—	—	—	—	Non-album singles
"Dark Eyed Daughter of Love"	1973	—	—	—	—	Non-album singles
"Rescue Man"	1973	—	—	—	—	Non-album singles
"Mobile"	1973	—	—	—	—	Non-album singles
"Camp Followin' Rosie"	1973	—	—	—	—	Non-album singles
"Moonlight Lady"	1974	—	—	—	—	Non-album singles
"Something's Missin' in My Life"	1974	—	—	—	—	Non-album singles
"Dance ('Till You're Out of My Life)"	1978	—	—	—	—	Scott English
"Stay"	1978	—	—	—	—	Scott English

=== Selected credits ===
==== 1960s ====
- Al Martino. "Adios Mexico" (1966)
- Eric Burdon. "Help Me, Girl" (1966)
- The Toys. "Ciao Baby" (1966)
- The Montanas. "Ciao Baby" (1967)
- The Outsiders. "Bend Me, Shape Me" (1967)
- The American Breed. "Bend Me, Shape Me", "Don't Make Me Leave You" (1967)
- Jeff Beck. "Hi Ho Silver Lining" (1967)
- Peter Law. "Lingering On" (1967)
- Lynne Randell. "Ciao Baby" (1967)
- Group Check. "Ciao Baby" (1968)
- The American Breed. "Cool It (We're Not Alone)" (1968)
- Amen Corner. "Bend Me Shape Me" (1968)
- James & Bobby Purify. "Help Yourself (To All Of My Lovin')" (1968)
- Joe Simon. "Help Yourself (To All My Lovin')" (1969)
- Mama Cass. "Welcome To The World" (1968)

==== 1970s ====
- Steve & Albert. "Follow The Bouncing Ball" (1970)
- The Glass Bottle. "Wonderwheel" (1971)
- Greyhound. "I Am What I Am" (1972)
- Bunny Walters. "Brandy" (1972)
- Raiders: "Ballad Of The Unloved" (1972)
- Al Wilson. "All For You" (1973)
- The Bells. "He Was Me, He Was You" (1973)
- Barry Manilow. "Mandy" (1974)

==== 1980s ====
- Barry Mann & Carole King. "You're The Only One" (1980)
- Black Lace. "Hi Ho Silver Lining" (1984)
- Slade. "Hi Ho Silver Lining" (1985)

==== 1990s ====
- Lynsey De Paul. "Words Don't Mean A Thing" (1994)
- Alan Parsons. "One Day To Fly" (1996)
- Imaani. "Something's Changing" (1998)
- Imaani. "Where Are You" (1998)

==== 2000s ====
- Syria. "Manca di te" (2000)
- Indiana [BE]. "Imitation Love" (2002)
- Sarah Kreuz. "Gipsy Girl" (2009)
- Sarah Kreuz. "I'll Be Yours" (2009)
- Sarah Kreuz. "Whenever It's Raining" (2009)
- Sarah Kreuz. "You Carried Me" (200)
- Spike [UK]. "The Brooklyn Bridge" (2014)
- Spike [UK]. Bonnie Tyler. "Fortune" (2014)
- Westway Beats. "Holla" (2014)
- Westway Beats. "Famous" (2015)
- Westway Beats. "Ruby Rain" (2015)
- Bob Welch. "Bend Me, Shape Me"
- Arthur Louis. "If Ever I Need You" (2009)
