= Help Me Girl =

1966 single by Eric Burdon

Single by Eric Burdon

from the album Eric Is Here
- B-side: "That Ain't Where It's At"
- Released: December 1966
- Recorded: 1966
- Genre: Pop
- Length: 2:34
- Label: MGM Records
- Songwriter(s): Scott English, Larry Weiss
- Producer(s): Tom Wilson

Eric Burdon singles chronology
"See See Rider" (1966)	"Help Me Girl" (1966)	"When I Was Young" (1967)

"Help Me Girl" is a song performed by Eric Burdon in 1966. It was billed to Eric Burdon for his 1967 solo album, Eric Is Here which also featured drummer Barry Jenkins, the only group member besides Burdon to remain during the transition from the "first" Animals group to the "new" lineup.

== Chart performance ==
"Help Me Girl" reached number 29 on the U.S. charts, number 14 on the UK charts, and number 25 in Canada - co-charting with the version by The Outsiders.

== Cover versions ==
- At the same time, of The Animals US release, The Outsiders released it as a single reaching number 37 on the U.S. charts.
- "Help Me Girl" was covered a few times and was the only single of Burdon's solo album.
