= Climax (band) =

American band (1970–1976)

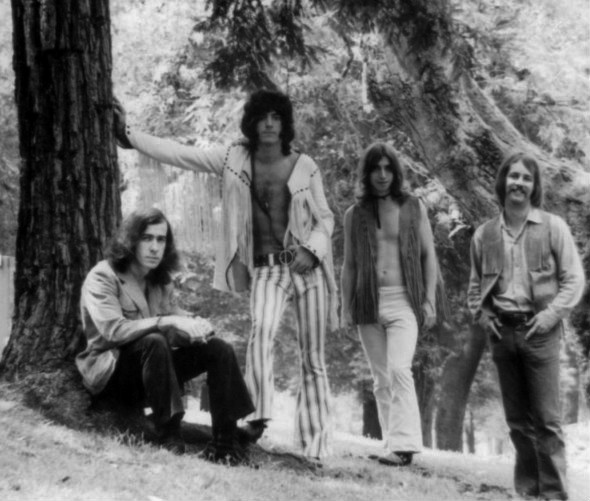
- Climax in 1970

Background information
- Origin: Los Angeles, California, U.S.
- Genres: Soft rock, pop rock
- Years active: 1970–1976
- Label: Rocky Road
- Spinoff of: The Outsiders

Climax was an American band formed in 1970 in Los Angeles, California, most noted for their 1971-1972 hit song "Precious and Few", which peaked at No. 3 on the Billboard Hot 100 singles chart and No. 1 on Cashbox magazine's Top 100 singles chart. This disc sold over one million copies and was certified gold by the RIAA on February 21, 1972. The band also first recorded and released the song "Rock and Roll Heaven" in 1973 before it was popularized a year later by The Righteous Brothers (with some updated lyrics) as their comeback single.

== Career ==
Climax initially consisted of lead singer Sonny Geraci; composer and guitarist Walter D. Nims; composer, singer, and keyboardist Nick D'Amico (Nicola Marcello D'Amico); and drummer Jon Jon Guttman (who wrote several songs on the band's lone album and also played other percussion). This quartet were soon augmented by unofficial fifth member (and second keyboardist) Johnny Stevenson, who officially joined the band upon D'Amico's departure in 1971. Rick Lipp also played keyboards with the band at some point. Executive producer Marc Gordon and record producer Larry Cox also played instrumental roles in recording the band and shaping their sound. The band was together from 1970 to 1976, during which they recorded one album, many singles and unreleased sides. They are generally considered a one-hit wonder because other than "Precious and Few", no other releases gained widespread success.

=== Origins ===
Climax descended from the 1960s hit band The Outsiders. Former Outsiders members Geraci, Nims, and D'Amico, along with new member Guttman recorded and released one single under the Outsiders name ("Changes"/"Lost in My World") and another issued as a solo single by Geraci ("Lovin' You"/"Think I'm Fallin'"), but when Tom King of the original band threatened legal action, the name of the band was changed to Climax for subsequent releases. The group had signed to Marc Gordon's Carousel label (which later changed its name to Rocky Road due to the existence of another label named Carousel), for which initial releases, including the "Changes"/"Lost in My World" single, were issued on Bell with a Carousel imprint. Carousel was then launched as an independent label, distributed by Bell, and its first release was Climax' debut single, "Hard Rock Group," which generated no major interest.

=== Scoring a hit ===
"Precious and Few", the band's biggest hit, was actually first recorded in 1970 with producer Ron Kramer and arranged by Nick D'Amico. It was later reworked by producer Larry Cox, who was assigned by label owner Marc Gordon to retool the band's material. Cox, who later worked with Jefferson Starship and produced many of their soft rock ballads (including "Miracles"), was introduced to Climax by fellow Texan and soon-to-be new Climax keyboardist Johnny Stevenson. Cox urged the band to re-record "Precious and Few" and encouraged lead singer Sonny Geraci to capitalize on his ability to perform high-powered ballads. Nick D'Amico (Nicola Marcello D'Amico) was called in to re-record the song with a re-working of his original arrangement. D'Amico played piano on the version that became famous.

Initially, nothing came of the newly recorded single. It was stored in the Bell Records archives for several months, but was dusted off after a Bell executive heard it being played on a Santa Barbara radio station (Climax's home base). Carousel released the record in Hawaii as a test six months prior to its becoming a hit on the mainland. After more market tests in Buffalo and Boston, the record gained momentum quickly. By the week ending February 26, 1972, "Precious and Few" had peaked at the No. 3 spot on the Billboard Hot 100 (spending two weeks at that position), and also hit No. 1 on Cashbox magazine's Top 100 chart.

"Precious and Few" was vocal arranger Tom Bahler's first opportunity to demonstrate his talents. Hired by producer Larry Cox, Bahler, along with his brother John, later created a significant impact in the music industry as arrangers and session singers in the late 1960s and 1970s performing on hundreds of singles, most notably the recordings by The Partridge Family.

=== Subsequent career ===
The follow-up single to "Precious and Few" was "Life and Breath", a song written by George S. Clinton (who contributed to the Austin Powers movie song tracks). "Life and Breath" reached No. 1 status in Hawaii, No. 11 at KHJ in Los Angeles, and topped out on the national charts at No. 52 on the Billboard Hot 100 and No. 15 on Billboard's Easy Listening chart. They were also the first band to record "Rock and Roll Heaven", a song written for Sonny Geraci by Alan O'Day and Climax keyboard player Johnny Stevenson, the latter of whom had officially replaced Nick D'Amico after he left the band in 1971. "Rock and Roll Heaven" was later recorded by The Righteous Brothers (with some lyric changes), and became the duo's comeback hit in the summer of 1974.

Once "Life and Breath" ran out of steam, Climax never recovered. Rocky Road's (formerly Carousel's) owner, Marc Gordon, was also managing The 5th Dimension at the time. In retrospect, Gordon's plate was full managing a supergroup, and signing and managing other artists, including Al Wilson ("The Snake" and "Show and Tell"). All of these factors hampered the success of "Life and Breath" and future Climax singles releases (including "Rock and Roll Heaven" and its predecessor, "Caroline This Time").

In 1972, the group's album Climax Featuring Sonny Geraci finally appeared. In addition to the core band members (and at-the-time unofficial member Stevenson), musicians who contributed to the album included bassists Joe Osborn, Steve La Fever, Reinie Press, and Joe Bellamy, keyboardist Larry Knechtel, additional drummers John Raines and Earl Palmer, percussionist Alan Estes, and Gordon MacKinnon, who performed double reed and woodwind solos. In spite of the success of "Precious and Few", the album barely made it into the top 200 portion of the Billboard 200 sales chart, peaking at No. 177.

Following "Rock and Roll Heaven," the group's next single, "Walking in the Georgia Rain," was issued with the artist name displayed as "Sonny Geraci and Climax". A short time later, an article appeared in Billboard stating that the group had recorded four new tracks with producer Steve Cropper, and "It's Gonna Get Better" was the first track issued from the session. "It's Gonna Get Better" was also issued as being performed by Sonny Geraci and Climax. The rare stock copy has another of the Cropper-produced tracks, "Let This Song Through" (written by Stevenson), on the flip side. The other new tracks recorded with Cropper were left in the can, as "It's Gonna Get Better" proved to be the final Climax release.

Keyboard player Johnny Stevenson also scored a solo release issued as Rocky Road 30065, pairing "The Great Campaign" (an instrumental written by Stevenson) with an instrumental version of "If It Feels Good, Do It".

During Climax's run with Rocky Road, they charted four top 5 records in Hawaii: "Precious and Few", "Life and Breath", "Caroline This Time" and "Walking in the Georgia Rain."

The song “Precious and Few” was featured in season 17 of the hit the CBS television show NCIS. TJL Media Archives in 2023 released the PBS television appearance of Sonny Geraci as a solo artist performing “Precious and Few” which was Sonny’s last national television performance.

=== Legacy/Aftermath ===
Some industry insiders felt Climax should have been far more successful than they actually were. The lack of a solid, powerful marketing and managing organization hurt the band when their follow-up "Life and Breath" was not given enough attention and funding to break through. After "Life and Breath" fizzled, the label did little to promote the band's only album, Climax featuring Sonny Geraci, which eroded the band's popularity and market edge. Yet, in spite of that, "Precious and Few" was a popular selection for proms and weddings, according to a 2011 interview with Geraci.

Nims, the band's principal songwriter and guitarist, died on March 31, 2000, at age 56, after suffering a stroke. Guttman died from a traffic accident on January 7, 2003, at the age of 55/56. Geraci died on February 5, 2017, at the age of 70.

== Discography ==
=== Albums ===
Climax's lone album, Climax Featuring Sonny Geraci, was released in 1972 on Rocky Road Records. The album had twelve cuts, and some were used as B-sides for subsequent singles. The album reached No. 177 in the US.

Side 1

1. "Life and Breath" - (3:17)
2. "I've Got Everything" - (3:16)
3. "Postlude" - (0:38) (instrumental - orchestral version of "I've Got Everything")
4. "Picnic in the Rain" - (3:29)
5. "Face the Music" - (3:00)
6. "Precious and Few" - (2:43)

Side 2

1. "It's Coming Today" - (3:02)
2. "Rainbow Rides Are Free" - (3:06)
3. "If It Feels Good - Do It" - (3:33)
4. "Merlin" - (4:18)
5. "Prelude" - (0:48) (instrumental - orchestral version of "Life and Breath")
6. "Child of December" - (3:15)

In 1979, a compilation album titled Picnic in the Rain was released on Koala Records. Only two of the songs had appeared on their 1972 album.

Side 1

1. "Changes" - (2:48)
2. "Somebody's Watching You" - (4:02)
3. "The War" - (3:28)
4. "Small World" - (2:47)
5. "Child of December" - (3:19)

Side 2

1. "Hard Rock Group" - (3:15)
2. "Park Preserve" - (5:26)
3. "Easy Evil" - (4:08)
4. "Searchin'" - (4:06)
5. "Picnic in the Rain" - (3:17)

Notes:

1. "Changes" and "Hard Rock Group": A-sides of single releases. "Hard Rock Group" appears in stereo only on this LP ("Changes" is mono).
2. "Park Preserve": Originally B-side to "Precious and Few", this was the full unedited version and is in stereo.
3. "Child of December" and "Picnic in the Rain": Originally released on 1972 album.
4. "Somebody's Watching You", "The War", "Small World", "Easy Evil" and "Searchin'": Previously unreleased

In 1980, Koala released yet another Climax album titled If It Feels Good, but the album was credited in error to Climax Blues Band. Most of the LP was taken from the 1972 LP, but there were three tracks unique to this release.

Side 1

1. "I've Got Everything"
2. "Ain't Going Nowhere"
3. "Don't Start Something You Can't Finish"
4. "Waitin' for the End to Come"
5. "It's Coming Today"

Side 2

1. "Rainbow Rides Are Free"
2. "If It Feels Good Do It"
3. "Merlin"
4. "Life and Breath"

Notes:

1. "Ain't Going Nowhere" (1:30) is a partial early version of "Park Preserve" which begins with the line "Ain't goin' nowhere, I wanna be with you", goes into the middle section and then ends abruptly. The song is not the same as the version on the flip of "Precious and Few". The guitar solo is different, horns are included and the vocal is different.
2. "Don't Start Something You Can't Finish" (2:29), written by Nims, appears only on this LP.
3. "Waitin' for the End to Come" (2:35), also written by Nims, appears in stereo.

=== LP of Sounds Like the Navy radio show appearance ===
In 1972, the group appeared "live in the studio" for the promotional Sounds Like the Navy radio show, issued on two LPs only to radio stations. Performing without any orchestral backing, the group faithfully reproduced many of their released songs and also performed several songs, including originals written by Nims, that were never issued in any other format.

The show was split into four 15-minute mini episodes and the songs that were performed in full were: "I've Got Everything", "I Can't Quit Her", "Life and Breath", "The Lady is a Nasty Dancer", "Picnic in the Rain", "Going Through the Motions", "Droopy Shoulders", "Wait For You", "Child of December", "Hand Me Down My Rock n' Roll Shoes", "Face the Music", "Precious and Few". Songs performed and only had parts aired were: "If It Feels Good, Do It", "Diving Duck Blues", "The Cage", and "Rainbow Rides Are Free".

=== Singles ===
- "Lovin' You" / "Think I'm Fallin'" (issued as by Sonny Geraci, on Capitol; both sides written by Walter Nims)
- "Changes" / "Lost in My World" (issued as by The Outsiders, on Bell with Carousel logo before Carousel became a separate sub label; both sides written by Nims)
- "Hard Rock Group" / Child of December (early version, different from album) A-side written by Nims
- "Precious and Few" (No. 3 Billboard Hot 100) / "Park Preserve" (B-side by Nims and non-LP; longer version of B-side issued on compilation CD)
- "Life and Breath" (No. 52 Billboard Hot 100) / "If It Feels Good Do It" (B-side later covered by The Stories)
- "Caroline This Time" / "Rainbow Rides Are Free" (A-side non-LP and written by Nims)
- "Rock and Roll Heaven" / "Face the Music" (A-side non-LP, written by Johnny Stevenson and Alan O'Day; lyrics revised for later version by The Righteous Brothers)
- "Walking in the Georgia Rain" / "Picnic in the Rain" (A-side non-LP and written by John Rhys; issued as by Sonny Geraci and Climax)
- "It's Gonna Get Better" / "Let This Song Through" (A-side non-LP and written by Geraci; B-side non-LP and written by Stevenson; issued as by Sonny Geraci and Climax)

=== Unreleased songs ===
(Some of these were recorded for their second album which was never released)

- "Waiting for the End to Come" (recorded as proposed A-side for Metromedia in 1969 but not released; appeared on compilation CD)
- "Hand Me Down My Rock n' Roll Shoes"
- "Droopy Shoulders"
- "Love Doesn't Live Here Anymore"
- "Young Boy" (written by Lee Dresser)
- "Rosemary Blue" (Written by Sedaka/Greenfield)
- "Searchin'" (cover of The Coasters track)
- "Wait for You" (cover of the Neil Young track)
- "The War" (Lee Michaels tune)
- "Easy Evil"
- "Somebody's Watching You" (Written by Sly Stone)
- "Small World"
- "Don't Start Something You Can't Finish"
- "Let This Song Through"

=== CD issues ===
There have been three official CDs released. All are on budget labels, and none have been remastered.

The first, titled Precious and Few (on KRB Records and later Classic Sound), was released in 1997 and listed ten tracks, but actually included eleven:

1. "Precious and Few"
2. "Life and Breath"
3. "Merlin"
4. "Picnic in the Rain" ("Postlude" is here prior to "Picnic...", but not listed)
5. "Rock and Roll Heaven"
6. "Park Preserve" (long version)
7. "Rainbow Rides Are Free"
8. "Waiting for the End to Come"
9. "It's Coming Today"
10. "If It Feels Good, Do It"

The second, titled The Best of Climax featuring Sonny Geraci (on Wise Buy Records), was released in 1998, and contained fifteen songs (actually sixteen with another "hidden" song). Many were in the "unreleased" category above:

1. "Precious and Few"
2. "Life and Breath"
3. "Rainbow Rides Are Free"
4. "If It Feels Good, Do It"
5. "Searchin'"
6. "Picnic in the Rain" (without "Postlude")
7. "Walking in the Georgia Rain"
8. "Love Doesn't Live Here Anymore"
9. "Rosemary Blue"
10. "Droopy Shoulders"
11. "Caroline This Time" (longer version than on the single)
12. "Young Boy"
13. "It's Coming Today"
14. "Merlin"
15. "Child of December" (with an unlisted "Prelude" before it)

The third compilation was released in 2002, and is available on iTunes:

1. "Precious and Few"
2. "Life and Breath"
3. "Merlin"
4. "Park Preserve"
5. "Picnic in the Rain"
6. "Rainbow Rides Are Free"
7. "Waiting for the End to Come"
8. "It's Coming Today"
9. "If It Feels Good Do It"
10. "I've Got Everything"
11. "Child of December"
12. "Searchin'" (shorter single version)
13. "The War"

Other bootlegs have been released including a 26 track compilation called The Best of Climax.

== See also ==
- List of 1970s one-hit wonders in the United States
