= Sonny Geraci =

American singer (1946–2017)

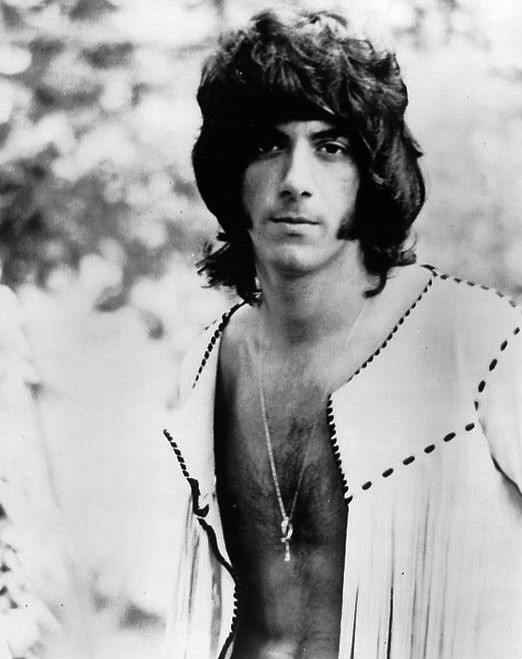
- Geraci in 1972

Background information
- Also known as: Peter Emmett
- Born: Emmett Peter Geraci; November 22, 1946; Cleveland, Ohio, U.S.
- Died: February 5, 2017 (aged 70) Cleveland, Ohio, U.S.
- Genre: Pop
- Occupation: Singer
- Label: Capitol
- Formerly of: The Outsiders; Climax; The Grass Roots

Emmett Peter "Sonny" Geraci (pronounced "Jer-ay-see"; November 22, 1946 – February 5, 2017) was an American singer, best known as lead singer of musical groups The Outsiders and Climax.

== Biography ==
Geraci first became known as the original lead vocalist with The Outsiders, a band from Cleveland, Ohio. The Outsiders recorded for Capitol Records, turning out four Top 40 hits: "Time Won't Let Me", "Respectable (What Kind of Girl Is This)", "Girl in Love", and "Help Me Girl", which was arranged by Chuck Mangione.

Geraci's biggest hit song was "Precious and Few" (first released as a single on July 16, 1971) as lead vocalist for Climax, which reached No. 3 on the Billboard charts. Climax released their debut album, Climax featuring Sonny Geraci, in 1972. Despite the success of the single, Geraci never released another album with Climax and the group disbanded in 1975. A second album of material was almost completed but never released.

In 1983, Geraci assumed the pseudonym Peter Emmett for an MCA project called "The Peter Emmett Story". Intended as a comeback vehicle for Geraci, he was backed in the studio by Donnie Iris's band, The Cruisers. A band called North Coast, pictured on the album sleeve, was put together after the recording had been made with The Cruisers. The band played shows in the Cleveland/Akron area before disbanding a few years later. In 2002, he filled in for his friend Rob Grill as lead vocalist for The Grass Roots and became an honorary member of the band.

After 25 years away from the music industry, Geraci started to perform again and in 2007 toured under the name "Sonny Geraci and The Outsiders". In April 2012, Geraci suffered a brain aneurysm (specifically, a cerebral arteriovenous malformation), requiring intensive care.

From November 15 to 16, 2013, a benefit concert for Geraci was held at the Z-Plex at Stringz 'N Wingz in Streetsboro, Ohio. The benefit concert featured several musicians and groups including The Rip Chords, Dennis Tufano, Gary Lewis, Frank Stallone, Gary DeCarlo, Joey Molland, Terry Sylvester, Billy Joe Royal, Ron Dante, Pat Upton, Jim Gold, The Shadows of Knight, The Michael Weber Show, Johnny Farina, The Vogues, and the 1910 Fruitgum Company.

Geraci died on February 5, 2017, at the age of 70. He was buried at Knollwood Cemetery in Mayfield Heights, Ohio.
