= Tom King (musician) =

American musician (1942–2011)

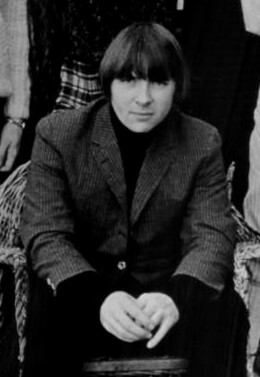
King in 1967

Thomas R. King (July 13, 1942 – April 23, 2011) was an American songwriter, guitarist, and arranger. He founded the 1960s rock band The Outsiders, and co-wrote the band's biggest hit song, "Time Won't Let Me".

== Life and career ==
Born in Cleveland, Ohio, King attended East Cleveland's Shaw High School in the late 1950s. He formed The Starfires, also known as Tom King & the Starfires, at the age of 15. He formed the rock band The Outsiders in 1965, as a continuation of The Starfires. King co-wrote the band's 1966 hit "Time Won't Let Me", from the album of the same name, with brother-in-law Chet Kelley. The song spent 15 weeks on the Billboard Hot 100 chart, peaking at No. 5, and selling over a million copies. Iggy Pop redid the song on his album Party in 1981, then The Smithereens also had a hit with the song, remaking it in 1994. King won a BMI award for the song having been played on the radio over four million times.

King died at a nursing home in Wickliffe, Ohio on April 23, 2011, at the age of 68. He suffered from congestive heart failure.
