= Larry Weiss =

American songwriter and musician (born 1941)

Laurence D. "Larry" Weiss (born March 25, 1941) is an American songwriter and musician. He wrote "Rhinestone Cowboy", a US no.1 hit for Glen Campbell in 1975; and co-wrote "Bend Me, Shape Me", "Hi Ho Silver Lining" and several other international hits.

== Biography ==
Weiss was born in Newark, New Jersey, and grew up in Queens, New York. He started writing songs in his teens, and continued to do so while working in his family's textile sales business. He was hired as a freelance songwriter by producer-composer Wes Farrell. His first break came in 1963 when Nat "King" Cole recorded "Mr. Wishing Well", a song Weiss co-wrote with Lockie Edwards Jr. (1936–2012). Weiss also wrote for R&B acts including Baby Washington, Chuck Jackson and The Shirelles.

In the mid and late 1960s Weiss co-wrote several successful songs with lyricist Scott English. These included "Bend Me, Shape Me", a hit for The American Breed (US no.5, CAN no. 7, UK no.24) and Amen Corner (UK no.3); "Hi Ho Silver Lining", a UK hit for Jeff Beck (UK no.14); and "Help Me Girl", a hit for Eric Burdon & The Animals (US no.29, CAN no. 25, UK no.14) and The Outsiders. He also co-wrote, with Jerry Ross, "Mr. Dream Merchant", a hit for Jerry Butler (US no.38, CAN no. 45) and later (as "Dream Merchant") for New Birth (US no.36). He also wrote "Evil Woman," which was recorded by the U.K. blues-rock band Spooky Tooth on their second album, Spooky Two.

In 1971, he moved with his family from New York to Los Angeles, where he worked for Famous Music. He recorded a singer-songwriter album, Black & Blue Suite, in 1974 for 20th Century Records. The album's opening track, "Rhinestone Cowboy", was released as a single and rose to no.24 on the Billboard adult contemporary chart. Glen Campbell heard and liked the song, and recorded it; his version became an international hit, reaching no.1 in the US and several other countries, and no.4 in the UK, and was the Country Music Association's Song of the Year in 1976. Another track from Black & Blue Suite, "Lay Me Down," was covered by Barry Manilow on his albums Tryin' to Get the Feeling and Barry Manilow Live and by Glen Campbell on his album Bloodline.

Weiss moved to Nashville in 1992, and continued to write songs for other artists, as well as developing his idea for a musical based around "Rhinestone Cowboy". He also released an album in his own name, Cuts and Scratches, in 2010.
