= Rufus (Rufus album) =

1973 debut album by Rufus

Studio album by Rufus
- Released: July 18, 1973
- Recorded: 1972–1973
- Studio: Quantum Studios (Torrance, California)
- Genre: Funk rock; soul; R&B
- Length: 42:40
- Label: ABC
- Producer: Bob Monaco

Rufus chronology
Rufus (1973)	Rags to Rufus (1974)

Professional ratings
Review scores
Source	Rating
AllMusic	2.5/5 stars
The Rolling Stone Album Guide	2/5 stars

Rufus is the debut album by American R&B and funk band Rufus, released on the ABC Records label in 1973 fronted by singers Chaka Khan and Ron Stockert. The album is notable for an upbeat rock/soul sound that would be replaced by a more heavy direction into funk and jazzy-styled recordings.

== History ==
Rufus was formed in 1969 by Kevin Murphy and Al Ciner from the background of two rival bands in Chicago. The band was a group in transition by the time they signed their deal with ABC in 1972 after a brief period with Epic. The biggest change in the group occurred that year when Paulette McWilliams, the group's original frontwoman, opted to leave the group and had friend Chaka Khan, who had provided background vocals as a session singer for the band, replace her as the sole frontwoman.

Though not entirely focused on Khan's talents – the band's artistic direction was led by singer and multi-instrumentalist Ron Stockert – Khan added something missing from the group, a diverse vocalist. Khan was able to perform both in lower and higher octaves and was equipped to singing the group's rockier numbers as she had singing slower ballads. The nineteen-year-old Khan was born Yvette Marie Stevens and changed her name to Chaka (which was a name given to her by a Yoruba Baba at 13 years old which means "Fire"). The debut album was recorded throughout 1972 and was released in the spring of 1973.

The album reached #44 on Billboard's R&B Album and #175 on Pop and included the single releases "Feel Good" (R&B #45) and "Whoever's Thrilling You (Is Killing Me)" (#40). Shortly after this album's release and struggling with the group's slow climb to success, Stockert would leave the band during sessions of the group's next album, Rags to Rufus. By then, Khan's role would be updated and as the group became successful in later years, most of the focus of the band would lay solely on Khan's shoulders.

== Track listing ==
Side one
No.	Title	Writer(s)	Length
1.	"Slip 'n Slide"	Ron Stockert	3:47
2.	"Keep It Coming"	Nickolas Ashford, Valerie Simpson	3:12
3.	"There's No Tellin'"	Stockert	4:51
4.	"Maybe Your Baby"	Stevie Wonder	4:14
5.	"I Finally Found You"	Stockert	3:57

Side two
No.	Title	Writer(s)	Length
6.	"Feel Good"	Al Ciner	4:09
7.	"Satisfied"	Jeff Thomas	3:27
8.	"Haulin' Coal"	Stockert	5:00
9.	"Whoever's Thrilling You (Is Killing Me)"	Allen Toussaint	2:42
10.	"Love the One You're With"/"Sit Yourself Down" (Medley)	Stephen Stills	6:21

== Personnel ==
Rufus

- Chaka Khan – vocals, background vocals
- Dennis Belfield – acoustic bass guitar, electric bass, background vocals
- Al Ciner – acoustic guitar, electric guitar, background vocals
- André Fischer – percussion, drums, background vocals
- Kevin Murphy – organ, bass, clarinet, electric bass, bass (vocal), background vocals, Clavinet
- Ron Stockert – keyboards, Mellophonium, vocals, background vocals, Mellotron

with:

- Eric Fisher – backing vocals on "Maybe Your Baby"

== Production ==
- Bob Monaco – record producer
- Rufus – musical arrangers
- Don Sciarrotta – audio engineer, remixing
- Arnie Acosta – audio mastering
- Bill Imhoff – illustrations
- Bill Naegels – design
- Rid Dyer Inc. – design
- Marc Hauser – photography

== Charts ==
Album

Chart (1973)	Peak
U.S. Billboard Top LPs	175
U.S. Billboard Top Soul LPs	44

Singles

Year	Single	Peak chart positions	
Year	Single	US	US R&B
1973	"Slip 'n Slide"	110	—
1973	"Whoever's Thrilling You (Is Killing Me)"	—	40
1973	"Feel Good"	—	45
