= Street player =

Street player may refer to:

- Busker
- Prostitute
- Street Player, a 1978 album by the band Rufus
- "Street Player" (song), a song by the band Chicago
