= Tell Me Something Good =

1974 single by Rufus

- A-side label of US vinyl release

Single by Rufus

from the album Rags to Rufus
- B-side: "Smokin' Room"
- Released: June 1974
- Recorded: 1974
- Genre: Funk; funk rock; disco
- Length: 4:36 (album version); 3:30 (single version)
- Label: ABC Records
- Songwriter: Stevie Wonder
- Producers: Bob Monaco and Rufus

Rufus singles chronology
"Feel Good" (1973)	"Tell Me Something Good" (1974)	"You Got the Love" (1974)

Official audio
- "Tell Me Something Good" on YouTube

"Tell Me Something Good" is a song by Rufus included on their 1974 album Rags to Rufus, written by Stevie Wonder and released in 1974. This was the first and only hit credited to Rufus. As singer Chaka Khan's voice became the focus of the group, they changed their name to "Rufus featuring Chaka Khan" for their next album. The single was a hit in the United States, peaking at number three on the Billboard Hot 100 and spent one week at number one on the Cash Box Top 100. It was among the earliest hits to use the guitar talk box, by Tony Maiden.

== Production ==
The record was written by Stevie Wonder and produced by the band alongside Bob Monaco.

The song has been described as having ".. rude metallic guitar" (by Al Ciner) and ".. a beautiful bass, clav and heavy breathing groove." The song can be difficult to count as there is an off-count into the verse. The first note is on the "and of four."

== Critical reception ==
Bud Scoppa of Rolling Stone found the song has lots of "tension and charm from (Khan)'s tough, sexy vocals."

Jason Elias of AllMusic described the song as "a rare instance of an artist like Stevie Wonder giving away a tune that he could have had a big hit with himself."

== Promotion ==
On July 5, 1974, the band played the song on The Midnight Special and on September 7, played the song, along with "You Got The Love", on Don Cornelius' show Soul Train.

== Accolades ==
Rufus won a Grammy in the category of Best R&B Vocal Performance by a Duo, Group or Chorus for "Tell Me Something Good".

== Charts ==
=== Weekly charts ===
Chart (1974)	Peak position
Australia (Kent Music Report)	64
Canada RPM Top Singles	21
US Billboard Hot 100	3
US Billboard R&B	3
US Cash Box Top 100	1

=== Year-end charts ===
Chart (1974)	Position
Australia	186
Canada	89
US Billboard Hot 100	56
US Cash Box	49

== Certifications ==
Region	Certification	Certified units/sales
United States (RIAA)	Gold	1,000,000^{^}
^{^} Shipments figures based on certification alone.

== Personnel ==
- Chaka Khan – lead vocals, background vocals
- Ron Stockert – vocals, keyboards
- Kevin Murphy – organ, Hohner clavinet
- Nate Morgan (uncredited) – keyboards
- Al Ciner – guitar
- Tony Maiden (uncredited) – guitar, talk box
- Dennis Belfield – bass, background vocals
- André Fischer – drums, percussion

== In popular culture ==
- BET cable network aired and produced a phone-in game show named after the song (which was also the theme song). Julie Rogers hosted this show which was a short-lived, live call-in game show where home viewers have to answer one question of the day that was followed by a panel of three celebrity judges ranking the best responses for a prize. It aired from 1988 to 1989.
- On Will & Grace, Karen tells Jack that this is the song to which she and Stan have sex. She then walks in on her husband cheating on her with the same song playing. Closed captioning for that episode incorrectly credits the song to Sly and the Family Stone.
- In That '70s Show, in the episode "Water Tower" (June 14, 1999), Eric walks in on his parents having sex to the song and it plays every time he has recurring nightmares and thoughts of his parents. It also plays on his radio.
- Ray Romano's character sings in a variation of the song while eating his wife's braciole in the Everybody Loves Raymond season 4 episode 18, "Debra Makes Something Good" (February 28, 2000).
- New York radio station WCBS-FM had a show in the morning named after the song (which was also the theme song). The host told the listeners about a positive true event that happened that day. The Bobby Bones Show also has a segment named after the song.
- The song is featured in the season 3 finale of Titans. After Dick Grayson, Conner Kent, and Gar Logan defeat Jonathan Crane, Dick calls Barbara Gordon and asks her to "tell him something good". Bruce Wayne's computer mistakes this request for Dick telling it to play the song, which leads into a montage of the aftermath of the Titans’ heroism.

== Ewan McVicar version ==
In 2021, Scottish DJ and producer Ewan McVicar released a dance version of the song on Trick Records which was licensed to Ministry of Sound. It reached the UK Singles Chart in September 2021, entering the top 40 of the chart dated October 15–21, 2021. On 5 November 2021, the song had reached number 15. It was certified gold by the BPI in 2022. It also reached No. 12 in Ireland, No. 34 on the Dutch Top 40 and No. 49 on the US Billboard Hot Dance/Electronic Songs chart.

=== Charts ===
Chart performance for "Tell Me Something Good" (Ewan McVicar version)
Chart (2021–2022)	Peak position
Ireland (IRMA)	12
Netherlands (Dutch Top 40)	34
Netherlands (Single Top 100)	89
UK Singles (Official Charts)	15
US Hot Dance/Electronic Songs (Billboard)	49

=== Certifications ===
Certifications for "Tell Me Something Good"
Region	Certification	Certified units/sales
United Kingdom (BPI)	Platinum	600,000^{‡}
^{‡} Sales+streaming figures based on certification alone.

== Covers and samples ==
The song was covered by Ronnie Laws on his 1975 album Pressure Sensitive and Phil Upchurch on his 1975 album Upchurch/Tennyson. Robbie Nevil released a cover version on his 1991 album Day 1. Pink also covered the song on the soundtrack of the 2006 animated film Happy Feet.

UGK sampled "Tell Me Something Good" on the song "Something Good", from their 1992 debut album Too Hard to Swallow. Mac Dre sampled the tune on "2 Hard 4 the Fuckin' Radio" off his 1993 debut album Young Black Brotha. Lucky Daye sampled the song on his 2020 album Karma.

God's Property featuring Kirk Franklin interpolated "Tell Me Something Good" on the song "Faith".
