= Rags to Rufus =

1974 studio album by Rufus

Studio album by Rufus
- Released: May 1974
- Recorded: 1973–1974
- Studio: Quantum Studios (Torrance, California)
- Genre: Funk; R&B
- Length: 39:50
- Label: ABC
- Producer: Bob Monaco; Rufus

Rufus chronology
Rufus (1973)	Rags to Rufus (1974)	Rufusized (1974)

Singles from Rags to Rufus
- 1. "Tell Me Something Good" Released: 1974; 2. "You Got the Love" Released: 1974

Professional ratings
Review scores
Source	Rating
AllMusic	3/5 stars
Christgau's Record Guide	B
Rolling Stone	(not rated)
The New Rolling Stone Record Guide	3/5 stars

Rags to Rufus is the second studio album by funk band Rufus, released on the ABC Records label in 1974. It reached number 4 on both the Pop and Black Albums charts. It is notable for the hit singles "Tell Me Something Good" (US Pop number 3, US R&B number 3), written by Stevie Wonder, and "You Got the Love" (US Pop number 11, US R&B number 1), written by lead vocalist Chaka Khan and Ray Parker Jr. In 1975, "Tell Me Something Good" earned the band its first Grammy Award for Best R&B Performance by a Duo or Group with Vocals.

== History ==
In 1973, Rufus released their first album. While Khan handled lead vocals on seven of the tracks, then-member Ron Stockert also led on a number of tracks. While "Slip & Slide", Rufus' first single, with Stockert applying lead vocals, failed to chart, two numbers from the album ("Feel Good" and "Whoever's Thrilling You is Killing Me") were led by Khan. Reaction from the Khan-led singles gave ABC Records the push to make Khan the focal point of the group, something that didn't sit well with Ron Stockert, who was then the band's artistic leader. While Stockert would be featured on the album singing lead with Khan on their funky remake of the gospel ballad, "Swing Down Chariot" and was featured on the inner sleeve of the album, halfway through sessions, Stockert left the group. Keyboardist Nate Morgan replaced him. Tony Maiden (who later replaced Al Ciner on guitar) would bring an extra effort to their yet-established sound – the use of the talk box.

While recording in Los Angeles, California, the group was surprised by the unannounced arrival of Stevie Wonder, who had admired the group after hearing their rendition of his song "Maybe Your Baby". Wonder had several songs he had written for Khan. One of the songs – "Come and Get This Stuff" – was not received favorably by Khan which stunned Wonder, according to Khan (the song would later appear on his ex-wife Syreeta's second album Stevie Wonder Presents: Syreeta). Wonder then asked Khan, then only twenty at the time, what her birth sign was, Khan replied "Aries-Pisces" and Wonder responded by introducing another song, "Tell Me Something Good". This time Khan approved and agreed to put her vocal stamp on it.

When Khan chose to sing the song in her key, Wonder stopped the session abruptly and then guided Khan to sing it in the way he had written it. Khan recorded her Wonder-arranged vocal in one take and the rest of the band recorded their track the next day with Maiden providing the talk box effect on the song's chorus. "Tell Me Something Good" was one of the last songs the group recorded for the album and the album was released in the spring of 1974. On the strength of "Tell Me Something Good" and the Khan-written "You Got the Love," Rags to Rufus later sold over a million copies later going platinum. After this release, founding member Al Ciner, Dennis Belfield, and Stockert would leave; the lineup of the group by the time of their next album had changed drastically.

== Track listing ==
Side one
No.	Title	Writer(s)	Length
1.	"You Got the Love"	Chaka Khan, Ray Parker Jr.	4:39
2.	"I Got the Right Street (But the Wrong Direction)"	Ron Stockert	3:17
3.	"Walkin' in the Sun"	Jeff Barry	3:02
4.	"Rags to Rufus" (Instrumental)	Kevin Murphy, André Fischer, Khan, Stockert, Dennis Belfield, Al Ciner	4:05
5.	"Swing Down Chariot"	Murphy, Fischer, Khan, Stockert, Belfield, Ciner	4:25

Side two
No.	Title	Writer(s)	Length
6.	"Sideways" (Instrumental)	Murphy, Fischer, Khan, Stockert, Belfield, Ciner	1:55
7.	"Ain't Nothin' But a Maybe"	Nickolas Ashford, Valerie Simpson	3:36
8.	"Tell Me Something Good"	Stevie Wonder	4:40
9.	"Look Through My Eyes"	Belfield	3:13
10.	"In Love We Grow"	Belfield	2:38
11.	"Smokin' Room"	Belfield	4:20

== Personnel ==
Rufus

- Chaka Khan – lead vocals, background vocals
- Dennis Belfield – background vocals, bass
- André Fischer – drums, percussion, background vocals
- Kevin Murphy – organ, clavinet, background vocals
- Al Ciner – electric & acoustic guitars, background vocals
- Ron Stockert – lead vocals, keyboards, background vocals

== Production ==
- Bob Monaco, Rufus – producers
- Clare Fischer – orchestration
- Don Sciarrotta – chief recording & re-mix engineer
- Tony Sciarrotta – assistant engineer
- Vic Zaslow – audio mastering
- Ron Stockert, Dennis Belfield, Al Ciner – string & horn arrangements
- Arthur Lee Hanson – photography

== Charts ==
Album

Chart (1974)	Peak
U.S. Billboard Top LPs	4
U.S. Billboard Top Soul LPs	4

Singles

Year	Single	Peak chart positions	
Year	Single	US	US R&B
1974	"Tell Me Something Good"	3	3
1974	"You Got the Love"	11	1

== Certifications ==
Region	Certification	Certified units/sales
United States (RIAA)	Gold	500,000^{^}
^{^} Shipments figures based on certification alone.
