= Beau Williams =

American gospel singer (1950–2026)

- Born: January 6, 1950; Houston, Texas, U.S.
- Died: June 17, 2026 (aged 76) Houston, Texas, U.S.
- Genres: Gospel, R&B
- Occupation: Singer
- Instrument: Vocals
- Years active: 1982–2026
- Labels: Light, Capitol

Beau Williams (January 6, 1950 – June 17, 2026) was an American gospel singer from Texas. Through Light Records he released an album Wonderful, which reached number two on the Billboard Gospel charts.

== Life and career ==
=== Early years ===
Williams was born in Houston, Texas on January 6, 1950, the son of a Baptist preacher and choir director. Raised in Houston, he began as a regular on a live television show and had a regional hit record as Bobo Mr Soul, in his hometown whilst still a teenager. Williams appeared on Star Search in 1984 (where he defeated the thirteen-week-long champion Sam Harris).

=== Recording career ===
Williams' albums with Capitol Records include a self-titled album in 1982, Stay with Me (1983), Bodacious! (1984), No More Tears (1986). "C'est La Vie", track 3 on his 1984 album, was later covered in 1986 by singer-songwriter Robbie Nevil, who also co-wrote the song in 1984.

After his third Capitol release, Williams signed with Light Records and returned to his roots in Gospel music. Summing up ten of his career highlights in the gospel field, The Best of Beau Williams was issued in 1995.

His 1989 project, "Wonderful" debuted at the number nine spot on Billboard's chart, landed at two, and stayed in the top ten family for fifty eight consecutive weeks. In the meantime, it earned a Dove Award for "Song of the Year", and Grammy, Stellar, and James Cleveland Award nominations.

Williams' later releases include 2005's "Visions" & 2002's "The Greatest Gift". His other recordings include Higher, Love, Power, They Need to Know, Covenant Brothers, and This Christmas.

=== Other appearances ===
Williams was an anthem singer for the Los Angeles Lakers for six years, and has also performed for the Texas Rangers (MLB), Dallas Cowboys (NFL), and Houston Rockets (NBA). Beau Williams regularly appeared on Robert Tilton's Success-N-Life television program, which aired on BET from 1997 to 2007; and also appeared periodically on the Trinity Broadcasting Network (TBN), a religious broadcasting network.

=== Illness and death ===
Williams died of cancer on June 17, 2026, at the age of 76.

== Discography ==
=== Albums ===
Year	Album	Label	Peak chart positions	
Year	Album	Label	US R&B	US Gospel
1982	Beau Williams	Capitol Records	—	—
1983	Stay with Me	Capitol Records	—	—
1984	Bodacious!	Capitol Records	56	—
1986	No More Tears	Capitol Records	48	—
1989	Wonderful	Light Records	—	2
1990	Higher	Light Records	—	5
1992	Love	Light Records	—	20
1994	Power	Light Records	—	32
1995	This Christmas	Elbeau Records	—	—
2006	The Greatest Love	Elbeau Records	—	43
"—" denotes releases that did not chart.

=== Singles ===
Year	Single	US R&B
1982	"If You're Ready"	—
1982	"I Can't Wait 'till Summertime"	—
1983	"Elvina"	—
1983	"You've Been"	—
1984	"Don't Say No"	—
1984	"You Are the One"	64
1986	"There's Just Something About You"	38
1986	"All Because of You"	94
1986	"Give Me Up"	—
1986	"Been Too Long"	—
"—" denotes releases that did not chart.
