= Wot's It to Ya =

1987 single by Robbie Nevil

Single by Robbie Nevil

from the album Robbie Nevil
- B-side: "Wot's It To Ya" (To Ya Remix)
- Released: May 30, 1987
- Length: 3:41
- Label: Manhattan
- Songwriters: Robbie Nevil; Brock Walsh
- Producers: Alex Sadkin; Phil Thornalley

Robbie Nevil singles chronology
"Dominoes" (1987)	"Wot's It to Ya" (1987)	"Back on Holiday" (1988)

"Wot's It to Ya" is the third single by American musician Robbie Nevil from his self-titled debut album, released as a single in May 1987 by Manhattan Records. It peaked at number 10 on the US Billboard Hot 100.

== Lyrics and writing ==
The song is about an ex who jilted the singer and then wants to know how he's been, to which the reply is "wot's it to ya". At the end of recording the album, Nevil thought he had finished, having cut all the songs. He said that producer Alex Sadkin said, "You know what? We still don't have it." I'd be like, "We still don't have what?" And he goes, "We still don't have the first single." Sadkin told Nevil, "Always come from the school of you don't have your first single, and always try to the bitter end to come up with something even better." Therefore, "Wot's It to Ya" was written, even though in the end it wasn't released as the first single. The song features a harmonica solo by Judd Lander.

== Track listing ==
7"

1. "Wot's It to Ya" – 3:41
2. "Wot's It to Ya" (To Ya Remix) – 4:05

12" (US & Canada only)

1. "Wot's It to Ya" (Rusty's 12" Dance Mix) – 9:57
2. "Wot's It to Ya" (Rusty's Vocal Dub Mix) – 6:50
3. "Wot's It to Ya" (Rusty's Vocoder Dub) – 6:55
4. "Wot's It to Ya" (Extended To Ya Remix) – 5:09
5. "Wot's It to Ya" (To Ya Remix) – 4:05

12" (Europe only)

1. "Wot's It to Ya" (Rusty's 12" Dance Remix) – 9:57
2. "Wot's It to Ya" (Dub To Ya Mix) – 6:28
3. "Wot's It to Ya" (To Ya Remix) – 4:05

12" (Europe & Australasia only)

1. "Wot's It to Ya" (Extended To Ya Remix) – 5:09
2. "Wot's It to Ya" (Dub To Ya Mix) – 6:28
3. "Wot's It to Ya" (To Ya Remix) – 4:05

Cassette (UK only)

1. "Wot's It To Ya" (Extended To Ya Remix) – 5:09
2. "C'est la Vie" (The Steve Street Mix) – 5:11
3. "Dominoes" (Extended Vocal Mix) – 6:05
4. "Wot's It To Ya" (Extended To Ya Remix) – 5:09
5. "C'est la Vie" (The Steve Street Mix) – 5:11
6. "Dominoes" (Extended Vocal Mix) – 6:05

== Charts ==
Chart (1987)	Peak position
Canada Top Singles (RPM)	24
Europe (European Hot 100 Singles)	36
Finland (Suomen virallinen lista)	28
Germany (GfK)	43
New Zealand (Recorded Music NZ)	37
US Cash Box Top 100	15
US Billboard Hot 100	10
US Dance Club Songs (Billboard)	10
US Hot R&B/Hip-Hop Songs (Billboard)	69
