= Too Much Too Soon =

Too Much Too Soon may refer to:

== Music ==
- Too Much Too Soon (album), by New York Dolls, 1974
- Too Much Too Soon, a 2016 mixtape by Kent Jones
- "Too Much Too Soon", a song by Johnny Mathis from the 1961 album Live It Up!
- "Too Much Too Soon", a song by Loverboy from the 1985 album Lovin' Every Minute of It
- "Too Much Too Soon", a song by Marilyn Martin from the 1986 album Marilyn Martin
- "Too Much Too Soon", a song by Green Day from the deluxe edition of the 2004 album American Idiot

== Other uses ==
- Too Much, Too Soon, a 1957 autobiography by Diana Barrymore
- Too Much, Too Soon, a 1958 film based on Diana Barrymore's autobiography
