= One Step Closer to You =

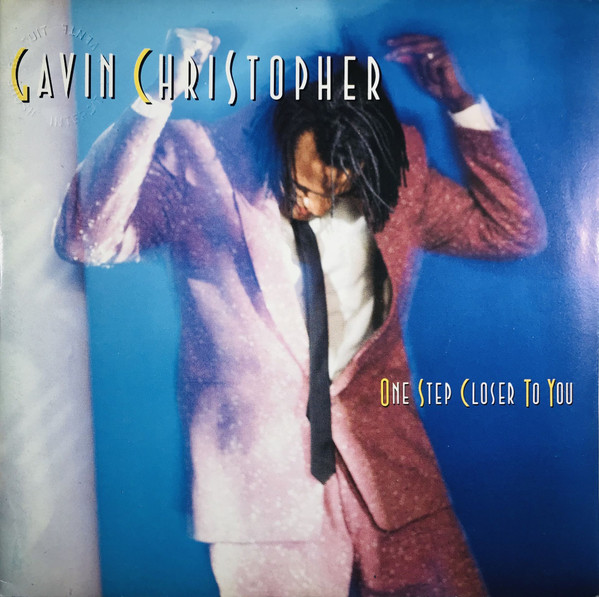

Single by Gavin Christopher

from the album One Step Closer
- Released: 1986
- Genre: Dance-pop
- Length: 5:06 (album version); 4:27 (single version)
- Label: EMI Manhattan
- Songwriters: Evan Rogers, Carl Sturken, Jeff Pescetto, David Grant
- Producers: Carl Sturken and Evan Rogers, Gavin Christopher

Gavin Christopher singles chronology
"One Step Closer to You" (1986)	"Back in Your Arms" (1986)

"One Step Closer to You" is a 1986 hit written by the then-budding songwriting/production team of Carl Sturken and Evan Rogers, along with singer/musician – and later noted soundtrack songwriter – Jeff Pescetto and former Linx frontman David Grant. The song became the only Top 40 Pop hit for noted R&B/Hip hop singer-songwriter/producer Gavin Christopher, peaking at #22.

== Background ==
The song first appeared (titled simply "One Step Closer") as an album track on the self-titled debut studio album from singer Marilyn Martin, released in early 1986. Later in 1986, Christopher released his own version of the song.

== Gavin Christopher recording ==
Christopher's version soon cracked the top-ten on the Dance charts and the top 25 on both the Pop (#22) and R&B charts (#25). It was the biggest hit of his career.

The basic rhythm structure, bass-line, and tempo of Christopher's version bear a striking similarity to that of Michael Jackson's hit, "The Way You Make Me Feel" from his Bad album, which was released the following year.
