= Ask Rufus =

1977 studio album by Rufus featuring Chaka Khan

Studio album by Rufus featuring Chaka Khan
- Released: January 19, 1977
- Recorded: June, August, September and November 1976
- Studios: Kendun Recorders (Burbank, California)
- Genres: Funk; soul
- Length: 37:17
- Labels: ABC; AB 975
- Producer: Rufus

Rufus featuring Chaka Khan chronology
Rufus featuring Chaka Khan (1975)	Ask Rufus (1977)	Street Player (1978)

Singles from Ask Rufus
- 1. "At Midnight (My Love Will Lift You Up)" Released: March 1977; 2. "Hollywood" Released: April 1977; 3. "Everlasting Love" Released: August 1977

Ask Rufus is the platinum-selling fifth studio album by funk band Rufus, released on the ABC Records label in 1977. The album spent three weeks atop the Billboard R&B Albums Chart in 1977. In 2020, it was ranked number 499 on Rolling Stone's 500 Greatest Albums of All Time.

== Background ==
By 1977, Rufus and Chaka Khan, now a fragile yet still tight unit, were starting to drift in different directions. Recording sessions for this album were troublesome due to tensions between Khan and drummer Andre Fischer. Khan's recent marriage to businessman Richard Holland had driven a wedge between Khan and Fischer. Khan would later report that during a session, with Holland present, Fischer and Holland had an altercation over a song that led to a fight in the bathroom. Upon hearing the struggle, Khan fought Fischer and bandmates reportedly had to carry her away from Fischer.

As a result, the recording of Ask Rufus was longer than other albums. Ask Rufus would turn out to be the final album to feature Fischer, who was a member of the group for five years. Despite his departure, Ask Rufus continued the group's success as they headed to the late 1970s. On the plus side, they gained another band member via this session. Keyboardist David "Hawk" Wolinski joined up with the band after a stint with Madura, thus complementing founding member Kevin Murphy's playing as well. Also former member Dennis Belfield returned to co-write "Everlasting Love" with Wolinski and Murphy.

== Reception and legacy ==
Professional ratings
Review scores
Source	Rating
AllMusic	4/5 stars
Christgau's Record Guide	C+
The Rolling Stone Album Guide	4/5 stars

Ask Rufus was the band's second album to top Billboard's R&B Albums chart and also reached No. 14 on Pop. The album includes the singles "At Midnight (My Love Will Lift You Up)", their third No. 1 hit on the R&B Singles chart and also No. 37 on Dance and No. 30 on Pop, "Hollywood" (US R&B No. 3, US Pop No. 32) and "Everlasting Love" (US R&B No. 17). In 1978, the Ask Rufus album earned the band their second Grammy Award nomination for Best R&B Performance by a Duo or Group with Vocal.

In a contemporary review, Billboard called Ask Rufus "the work of a wholly matured artist" and Khan "a fully-rounded r&b-rock vocalist who can be silky as well as a raunchy screamer". Carol Wetzel from the Spokane Daily Chronicle found the music "totally mature and full" yet danceable and highlighted by Khan's versatility and fluidity as a singer. Village Voice critic Robert Christgau was less impressed, disregarding her development into a "sophisticated song stylist" because he felt she still lacked "sophisticated songs" to sing.

The track "Hollywood" was later covered by Erykah Badu on the soundtrack to Spike Lee's 2000 movie Bamboozled, as well as being interpolated in India Arie's song "Little Things" on her second album, Voyage to India; "Everlasting Love" was covered by Mary J. Blige on the 1996 Olympic Games album Rhythm of The Games and was also covered by Vanessa Williams on her seventh album titled Everlasting Love (2005)

In 2020, Rolling Stone ranked the album at number 499 in their updated list of the 500 Greatest Albums of All Time.

== Track listing ==
Side one
No.	Title	Writer(s)	Length
1.	"At Midnight (My Love Will Lift You Up)"	Tony Maiden, Lalomie Washburn	4:20
2.	"Close the Door"	David Wolinski, Bobby Watson, Chaka Khan, André Fischer	3:25
3.	"Slow Screw Against the Wall / A Flat Fry" (Medley: Instrumental Interlude)	Wolinski / Watson	2:35
4.	"Earth Song"	Maiden, Traude Sapik, Khan	5:05
5.	"Everlasting Love"	Kevin Murphy, Wolinski, Dennis Belfield	4:46

Side two
No.	Title	Writer(s)	Length
6.	"Hollywood"	Wolinski, Fischer	4:10
7.	"Magic in Your Eyes"	Khan, Maiden	3:51
8.	"Better Days"	Richard Holland, Khan	4:14
9.	"Egyptian Song"	Wolinski, Khan	5:10

== Personnel ==
Rufus

- Chaka Khan – lead vocals, background vocals
- Tony Maiden – guitar, background vocals
- Kevin Murphy – keyboards, background vocals
- Bobby Watson – bass, background vocals
- André Fischer – drums, background vocals
- David "Hawk" Wolinski – keyboards, background vocals

with:

- Milt Holland – percussion
- Ronnie Wood – guitar on "A Flat Fry"

== Production ==
- Rufus – producers
- Gary Starr – engineer
- Michael Schuman – assistant engineer
- Clare Fischer – string arrangements and conductor
- Charles Garnett, Tony Maiden – horn arrangements on "At Midnight (My Love Will Lift You Up)"
- Brett Lopez – photography

== Charts ==
Album

Chart (1977)	Peak
U.S. Billboard Top LPs	12
U.S. Billboard Top Soul LPs	1

Singles

Year	Single	Peak chart positions		
Year	Single	US	US R&B	US Dance
1977	"At Midnight (My Love Will Lift You Up)"	30	1	37
1977	"Hollywood"	32	3	—
1977	"Everlasting Love"	—	17	—

== Certifications ==
Region	Certification	Certified units/sales
United States (RIAA)	Platinum	1,000,000^{^}
^{^} Shipments figures based on certification alone.

== Later Samples ==
- "Close the Door"
  - "Who's Crew" by Tracey Lee from the album Many Facez
- "Better Days"
  - "Finally Made It (Interlude)" by Mary J. Blige from the album Love & Life

== See also ==
- List of number-one R&B albums of 1977 (U.S.)
