= One Step Closer (Gavin Christopher album) =

Studio album by Gavin Christopher
- Released: 1986
- Recorded: Unique Recording (NYC); Music Grinder (LA); Right Track Recording (NYC); Good Earth Studios (London)
- Genres: Soul, R&B, Dance music, Pop, Electronic
- Length: 43:15
- Label: EMI Manhattan Records
- Producers: Carl Sturken and Evan Rogers, Gavin Christopher (co-producer)

Gavin Christopher chronology
Gavin Christopher (1979)	One Step Closer (1986)	Gavin (1987)

One Step Closer is an album by renowned R&B/Hip hop singer-songwriter/keyboardist/record producer Gavin Christopher. Released in 1986, this album contained Christopher's biggest solo hit, with the title track, "One Step Closer to You" reaching number 22 on the pop charts, number 25 on the R&B chart, and number 9 on the Dance chart. The follow-up single, "Back in Your Arms" could not duplicate this success, and the album fell off the charts.

The album also includes Christopher's own version of "Once You Get Started," a tune he had originally written for Rufus and Chaka Khan that became a top-ten Pop, R&B, and Dance hit for the group in the 1970s. Rufus guitarist Tony Maiden, who had shared lead vocals with Chaka Khan on the group's original recording (and had been Christopher's bandmate in the pre-Rufus group, High Voltage), provides backing vocals in addition to guitar on Christopher's version.

One Step Closer remains Gavin Christopher's most successful solo album to date, having peaked at number 74 on the Billboard 200 and number 36 on the Top R&B/Hip-Hop Albums chart on August 9, 1986.

The album is also notable for being the first successful project for the then-fledgling production team of Carl Sturken and Evan Rogers.

== Track listing ==
1. "One Step Closer to You" (Evan Rogers, Carl Sturken, Jeff Pescetto, David Grant) (5:10)
2. "Are We Running From Love" (Gavin Christopher, Paul Pesco) (4:46)
3. "In the Heat of Passion" (Rogers, Sturken) (5:07)
4. "Back in Your Arms" (Rogers, Sturken, Christopher) (5:36)
5. "Once You Get Started" (Christopher) (4:18)
6. "Love is Knocking at Your Door" (Rogers, Sturken, Nick Mundy, Christopher) (5:09)
7. "Sparks Turn Into Fire" (Rogers, Sturken) (4:30)
8. "Could This Be the Night" (Christopher) (4:29)
9. "That's the Kind of Guy I Am" (Christopher, Pesco) (4:10)

== Personnel ==
- Gavin Christopher - lead vocals on all tracks, additional instruments as noted below
- Carl Sturken and Evan Rogers - drum programming

=== Additional track-by-track personnel ===
==== "One Step Closer to You" ====
- Carl Sturken - keyboards, guitar
- Tom Mandell (sic) - additional keyboards
- Evan Rogers - backing vocals

==== "Are We Running From Love" ====
- Robbie Kilgore - keyboards
- Tony Maiden - guitar
- Evan Rogers, Bunny Hill, Clydene Jackson - backing vocals

==== "In the Heat of Passion" ====
- Carl Sturken - keyboards
- John Nevin - bass
- Evan Rogers, Audrey Wheeler - backing vocals

==== "Back in Your Arms" ====
- Carl Sturken - keyboards, guitar
- Evan Rogers, Siedah Garrett - backing vocals

==== "Once You Get Started" ====
- Carl Sturken - keyboards, guitar
- Tony Maiden - guitar, backing vocals
- Roger Byam - saxophone solo
- Evan Rogers, Toni Smith - backing vocals

==== "Love is Knocking at Your Door" ====
- Carl Sturken - keyboards
- Paul Pesco - guitar, backing vocals
- Evan Rogers, Gavin Christopher - backing vocals

==== "Sparks Turn Into Fire" ====
- Carl Sturken - keyboards, guitar
- Paul Pesco - guitar solo, backing vocals
- Evan Rogers - backing vocals

==== "Could This Be the Night" ====
- Gavin Christopher - keyboards, synthesizer soloing
- Carl Sturken - keyboards
- Keith Andès - keyboards, backing vocals
- Evan Rogers - backing vocals

==== "That's the Kind of Guy I Am" ====
- Paul Pesco - keyboards, guitar
- Carl Sturken - keyboards
- Robbie Kilgore - keyboards
- Gary Wallace - drum programming
- Evan Rogers, Gavin Christopher - backing vocals
