= Rufusized =

1974 studio album by Rufus featuring Chaka Khan

Studio album by Rufus featuring Chaka Khan
- Released: December 5, 1974
- Recorded: 1974
- Studio: The Record Plant (Los Angeles, California)
- Genre: Funk rock; R&B; soul
- Length: 37:14
- Label: ABC
- Producer: Bob Monaco

Rufus featuring Chaka Khan chronology
Rags to Rufus (1974)	Rufusized (1974)	Rufus featuring Chaka Khan (1975)

Singles from Rufusized
- 1. "Once You Get Started" Released: 1975; 2. "Please Pardon Me (You Remind Me of a Friend)" Released: 1975

Professional ratings
Review scores
Source	Rating
Allmusic	4/5 stars
Christgau's Record Guide	B+
The Rolling Stone Album Guide	5/5 stars

Rufusized is the third studio album by funk band Rufus, featuring Chaka Khan, on the ABC Records label in 1974, their second album release that year. The album peaked at number 7 on the Billboard album chart the week ending March 1, 1975.

== History ==
Rufus was formed in 1969 by Kevin Murphy and Al Ciner from the background of two rival bands in Chicago. The band was a group in transition by the time they signed their deal with ABC in 1972 after a brief period with Epic. The biggest change in the group occurred that year when Paulette McWilliams, the group's original frontwoman, opted to leave the group and had friend Chaka Khan, who had provided background vocals as a session singer for the band, replace her as the sole frontwoman.

By 1974, Rufus had gone from a popular local bar attraction in Chicago to a platinum-selling rock band on the strength of one gold-selling album and two hit singles. They also would boost their profile opening for superstars such as Marvin Gaye and The Rolling Stones and appearing on shows such as Soul Train, American Bandstand and The Mike Douglas Show. Their popularity had blown to huge proportions that the media was paying more attention to the band's frenetic, fiery lead singer, Chaka Khan, than the rest of the group. Due to Khan's strong vocals and loud appearance, which included a funky, frizzy redhead Afro and revealing clothing, she was immediately given comparisons to her singing idols, Aretha Franklin and Tina Turner.

Khan's rise to popularity caused friction between founding members Al Ciner and Dennis Belfield and former lead singer Ron Stockert, who left the group prior to the finish of Rags to Rufus, the band's breakthrough release. Bobby Watson would come into the picture as a bassist and while keyboardist Nate Morgan, who had just joined the group before the release of this album, was featured on the cover, he didn't participate in album sessions, nor was he credited. Khan, Murphy, and Fischer, who had joined the group in 1972, remained the only members who appeared on the group's first two albums, while Tony Maiden, who joined the group near the end of the Rags to Rufus sessions, started to make his presence felt as he added his own vocals, often duetting with Khan.

Sensing that their momentum would slow if they didn't come up with another album, the group immediately hit the studio just a few months after Rags to Rufus was recorded to record this record. Khan began to collaborate with the band more often on vocal songs as a co-writer, while also co-writing instrumentals the group would record. Released in late 1974, Rufusized immediately became a success peaking at number-two on the R&B chart and number-seven on the pop chart, selling a million copies. With songs such as the hits "Once You Get Started" and "Please Pardon Me" and album favorites such as the funky "Somebody's Watching You", "Pack'd My Bags" and "I'm a Woman" (which predated Khan's popular hit "I'm Every Woman" by four years), Rufus ended 1974 as rookie stars and entered 1975 as headliners.

== Track listing ==
Side one
No.	Title	Writer(s)	Length
1.	"Once You Get Started"	Gavin Christopher	4:29
2.	"Somebody's Watching You"	Tony Maiden, Chaka Khan, Bobby Watson	3:14
3.	"Pack'd My Bags"	Maiden, Khan	5:05
4.	"Your Smile"	Lalomie Washburn	3:23
5.	"Rufusized" (Instrumental)	Khan, Maiden, Watson, Kevin Murphy, André Fischer	3:16

Side two
No.	Title	Writer(s)	Length
6.	"I'm a Woman (I'm a Backbone)"	Washburn	3:18
7.	"Right Is Right"	Maiden, Murphy, Khan	3:16
8.	"Half Moon"	John Hall	3:14
9.	"Please Pardon Me (You Remind Me of a Friend)"	Brenda Gordon, Brian Russell	3:02
10.	"Stop on By"	Bobby Womack, Pete Thomas	4:52

== Personnel ==
Rufus

- Chaka Khan – lead vocals, background vocals
- Tony Maiden – lead guitar, lead vocals, background vocals
- Kevin Murphy – organ, clavinet, background vocals, acoustic piano, ARP synthesizer
- Bobby Watson – bass, background vocals
- André Fischer – drums, percussion

== Production ==
- Bob Monaco – producer
- Rufus – arrangements
- Clare Fischer, Kevin Murphy – string & horn arrangements
- Gerald Vinci – concertmaster
- Gary Olazabal, Austin Godsey, Michael Braunstein – engineers
- Norman Seeff – photography

== Charts ==
Album

Chart (1974)	Peak
U.S. Billboard Top LPs	7
U.S. Billboard Top Soul LPs	2

Singles

Year	Single	Peak chart positions		
Year	Single	US	US R&B	US Dance
1974	"Once You Get Started"	10	4	2
1974	"Please Pardon Me (You Remind Me of a Friend)"	48	6	—

== Certifications ==
Region	Certification	Certified units/sales
United States (RIAA)	Gold	500,000^{^}
^{^} Shipments figures based on certification alone.
