= Rufus featuring Chaka Khan (album) =

1975 studio album by Rufus featuring Chaka Khan

Studio album by Rufus featuring Chaka Khan
- Released: November 18, 1975
- Recorded: May–August 1975
- Studio: The Record Plant (Los Angeles); Kendun Recorders (Burbank, California)
- Genre: Funk; soul; R&B; disco
- Length: 38:46
- Label: ABC
- Producer: Rufus

Rufus featuring Chaka Khan chronology
Rufusized (1974)	Rufus featuring Chaka Khan (1975)	Ask Rufus (1977)

Singles from Rufus featuring Chaka Khan
- 1. "Sweet Thing" Released: 1975; 2. "Dance Wit Me" Released: 1976; 3. "Jive Talkin'" Released: 1976

Professional ratings
Review scores
Source	Rating
AllMusic	4/5 stars
Christgau's Record Guide	B
The New Rolling Stone Record Guide	3/5 stars

Rufus featuring Chaka Khan is the gold-selling fourth studio album by the funk band Rufus and Chaka Khan, released on the ABC Records label in 1975. It remained on top of the R&B album chart for six consecutive weeks.

== Track listing ==
Side one
No.	Title	Writer(s)	Length
1.	"Fool's Paradise"	Gavin Christopher	4:41
2.	"Have a Good Time"	Gavin Christopher	3:20
3.	"Ooh I Like Your Loving"	Bobby Watson, Tony Maiden, Chaka Khan	3:39
4.	"Everybody Has an Aura"	Gordon DeWitty	3:48
5.	"Circles"	Tony Dulaine	3:56

Side two
No.	Title	Writer(s)	Length
6.	"Sweet Thing"	Tony Maiden, Chaka Khan	3:18
7.	"Dance Wit Me"	Gavin Christopher	3:57
8.	"Little Boy Blue"	J. Farris	5:02
9.	"On Time" (Instrumental)	Chaka Khan, Tony Maiden, Bobby Watson, Kevin Murphy, André Fischer	3:31
10.	"Jive Talkin'"	Barry Gibb, Robin Gibb, Maurice Gibb	3:33

== Personnel ==
Rufus

- Chaka Khan – vocals
- Tony Maiden – guitar, vocals
- André Fischer – drums
- Kevin Murphy – keyboards
- Bobby Watson – bass guitar, vocals

with:

- Tower of Power Horn Section – horns

== Production ==
- Rufus – producers
- Austin Godsey – engineer
- John Calder, Peter Chaikin, Doug Rider – assistant engineers
- Clare Fischer – string arrangements
- Greg Adams – horn arrangements
- Bill Imhoff – cover illustration

== Charts ==
Chart (1975–76)	Peak Position
Australia (Kent Music Report)	86
U.S. Billboard Top LPs	7
U.S. Billboard Top Soul LPs	1

== Certifications ==
Region	Certification	Certified units/sales
United States (RIAA)	Gold	500,000^{^}
^{^} Shipments figures based on certification alone.

== Later samples ==
- "Ooh I Like Your Lovin'"
  - "The Blueprint" by Boogie Down Productions from the album Ghetto Music: The Blueprint of Hip Hop
- "Circles"
  - "The Becoming" by Little Brother from the album The Minstrel Show
- "Sweet Thing"
  - "B-Boy in Love" by Mellow Man Ace from the album Escape from Havana

and "Remind Me" by RBL Posse from the album "A Lesson to Be Learned"

== See also ==
- List of number-one R&B albums of 1976 (U.S.)
