= You Got the Love (Rufus song) =

Single by Rufus

from the album Rags to Rufus
- B-side: "Rags to Rufus"
- Released: October 19, 1974
- Genre: Funk
- Length: 2:54 (single version) 4:45 (album version)
- Label: ABC
- Songwriters: Chaka Khan, Ray Parker Jr.
- Producers: Bob Monaco, Rufus

Rufus singles chronology
"Tell Me Something Good" (1974)	"You Got the Love" (1974)	"Once You Get Started" (1975)

"You Got the Love" is a hit song for the funk band Rufus. It was written by Ray Parker Jr. and Chaka Khan. From the Rags to Rufus album, it spent one week at number one on the Hot Soul Singles chart in 1974. It also peaked at number 11 on the Billboard Hot 100 singles chart.

== Chart positions ==
Charts	Peak position
U.S. Billboard Hot 100	11
U.S. Billboard Hot Soul Singles	1

== Other versions ==
"You Got the Love" is the first track of 1983 live album Stompin' at the Savoy – Live.

Chaka Khan re-recorded "You Got the Love/Pack'd My Bags" medley for her 2007 album Funk This, with Tony Maiden on guitar.
