= A Place Like This (album) =

Studio album by Robbie Nevil
- Released: March 22, 1988
- Recorded: 1987
- Studios: Ground Control Studios (Santa Monica, California): Skyline Studios, Right Track Recording and The Hit Factory (New York City, New York)
- Genres: Rock, pop rock
- Length: 43:36
- Labels: EMI Manhattan; CDP-7-48359
- Producers: Robbie Nevil; Chris Porter; Tom Lord Alge

Robbie Nevil chronology
Robbie Nevil (1986)	A Place Like This (1988)	Day 1 (1991)

Professional ratings
Review scores
Source	Rating
allmusic	4/5 stars

A Place Like This is Robbie Nevil's second album, released in 1988. The album contains two tracks that became hit singles in the US. The first was "Back on Holiday" (US Billboard #34, Cash Box #30) followed by "Somebody Like You" (US Billboard #63).

== Track listing ==
1. "Somebody Like You" (Richard Feldman, Robbie Nevil, Jeff Pescetto) - 4:16
2. "Back on Holiday" (Nevil, David Paul Bryant, Steve Dubin) - 3:59
3. "Mary Lou" (Nevil, Brock Walsh) - 4:11
4. "Getting Better" (Nevil, Walsh) - 3:53
5. "Love and Money" (Nevil, Walsh) - 2:55
6. "Love Is Only Love" (Mark Mueller, Nevil) - 4:44
7. "Here I Go Again" (Mueller, Nevil) - 3:49
8. "Holding On" (J.P. Charles, Nevil, Duncan Pain) - 3:09
9. "Too Soon" (Nevil, Walsh) - 3:06
10. "Can I Count on You" (Clyde Lieberman, Nevil) - 4:51
11. "Dreams" (Nevil, John Van Tongeren) - 4:37

== Production ==
- Chris Porter – producer (1, 3, 5–10), recording (1, 3, 5–10), mixing
- Robbie Nevil – producer (2)
- Tom Lord-Alge – producer (4), recording (4)
- Alan Meyerson – recording (2)
- Ernie Sheesley – recording (5)
- Chris Fuhrman – additional engineer
- Will Rogers – additional engineer
- Claudio Ordenes – assistant engineer
- Brian Gardner – mastering at Bernie Grundman Mastering (Hollywood, CA)
- Henry Marquez – art direction
- Carol Chen – design
- Steve Danelian – photography
- Lisa Marie – production assistant, project coordination
- Ron Weisner Entertainment – management

== Personnel ==
- Robbie Nevil – lead vocals, all guitars, additional keyboards (1, 6, 11)
- John Van Tongeren – keyboards (1, 3, 6, 9, 10, 11), synth bass (1, 3, 6, 10, 11), percussion (6)
- Tommy Faragher – keyboards (2), backing vocals (2)
- Robbie Kondor – keyboards (4)
- "The Trash Band" – keyboards (5), synth bass (5)
- Billy Childs – acoustic piano (7)
- Richard Hurwitz – Synclavier (7)
- Casey Young – Synclavier (8)
- Nathan East – bass (1–3, 6, 11)
- Robbie Kilgore – bass (4)
- Neil Stubenhaus – fretless bass (4)
- Larry Gales – bass (7)
- "The Cook" – bass (8)
- Steve Dubin – drums (1, 2, 5, 10)
- Jimmy Bralower – drums (4)
- Bobby Colomby – drums (7)
- J.P. Charles – drums (8)
- Dave Weckl – drums (11)
- John "J.R." Robinson – additional percussion (1, 10), drums (3, 6)
- Paulinho da Costa – percussion (1, 3, 9, 10)
- Bashiri Johnson – percussion (2, 4)
- Lenny Pickett – saxophone (2)
- Danny Pelfrey – saxophone (3, 5, 6)
- Brandon Fields – saxophone (4)
- Voncielle Faggett – backing vocals (1, 3, 5, 6, 8, 10)
- Laura Hunter – backing vocals (1, 3, 6, 8, 10)
- Jeff Pescetto – backing vocals (1, 3, 6, 8, 10)
- Alfie Silas – backing vocals (1, 3, 6, 8, 10)
- Chris Thompson – backing vocals (1, 5, 6, 8, 10)
- Frank Floyd – backing vocals (2)
- Lotti Golden – backing vocals (2)
- Cindy Mizelle – backing vocals (2)
- Tommy Funderburk – backing vocals (3, 5, 10)
