= Sweet Thing (Rufus song) =

1975 song by Rufus featuring Chaka Khan

- Side A of the US 7-inch vinyl single

Single by Rufus featuring Chaka Khan

from the album Rufus featuring Chaka Khan
- B-side: "Circles"
- Released: November 28, 1975
- Recorded: 1975
- Genre: Soul
- Length: 3:19
- Label: ABC
- Songwriters: Chaka Khan; Tony Maiden
- Producer: Rufus

Rufus featuring Chaka Khan singles chronology
"Please Pardon Me (You Remind Me of a Friend)" (1975)	"Sweet Thing" (1975)	"Dance Wit Me" (1976)

"Sweet Thing" is a song performed by American funk and R&B band Rufus with vocals by band member Chaka Khan. As a single, it peaked number five on the US Billboard Hot 100 in 1976. American singer and songwriter Mary J. Blige recorded her version, which charted in the United States and New Zealand in 1993.

== Rufus featuring Chaka Khan version ==
Initially recorded and released a single in late 1975, it was first a hit with Rufus featuring Chaka Khan when they recorded the song in 1975, eventually reaching number-one on the R&B singles chart and number five on the pop chart. The song was co-written by Khan and Rufus bandmate Tony Maiden and became one of the band and Khan's signature songs. The record appears on the band's fourth album Rufus featuring Chaka Khan (1975). Khan re-recorded it for the 1998 soundtrack New York Undercover: A Night at Natalie's.

In 2024, Rufus bassist Bobby Watson claimed he helped composed the song but that Maiden refused to share writing credit.

In 2009, Essence magazine included the song in their list of the "25 Best Slow Jams of All Time".

=== Track listing ===
1. "Sweet Thing"
2. "Circles"

=== Charts ===
Chart (1975–1976)	Peak position
US Billboard Hot 100	5
US Hot R&B/Hip-Hop Songs (Billboard)	1

=== Certifications ===
Region	Certification	Certified units/sales
United States (RIAA)	Gold	1,000,000^{^}
^{^} Shipments figures based on certification alone.

== Mary J. Blige version ==
"Sweet Thing"
- US retail cassette edition; the US CD release was promo-only

Single by Mary J. Blige

from the album What's the 411?
- Released: April 2, 1993
- Recorded: 1992
- Genre: R&B; soul
- Length: 3:44
- Label: Uptown; MCA
- Songwriters: Chaka Khan; Tony Maiden
- Producers: Mark Morales; Mark C. Rooney

Mary J. Blige singles chronology
"Dolly My Baby" (1993)	"Sweet Thing" (1993)	"Love No Limit" (1993)

In 1992, American singer and songwriter Mary J. Blige recorded a rendition for her debut album, What's the 411? (1992). It became Blige's third top 40 on the US Billboard Hot 100, reaching number 28. In addition, it marked Blige's first entry on the New Zealand Singles Chart. Blige also performed the song live on the eighteenth season of Saturday Night Live on March 13, 1993.

=== Critical reception ===
Daryl McIntosh from Albumism stated that Blige's "savory rendition" of the Rufus song "helped provide depth to her groundbreaking album". Stanton Swihart from AllMusic described it as "gospel-thrusted", stating that songs like "Sweet Thing" "are and will remain timeless slices of soul even after their trendiness has worn off". Larry Flick from Billboard magazine said the singer's version is "a faithful rendition of the Chaka Khan & Rufus classic. A shoulder-swaying rhythm base firmly supports an appealing, diva-style vocal and familiar funk guitar chords." He added, "Watch this one glide onto pop and urban playlists within seconds." The Daily Vault's Mark Millan noted that "Sweet Thing" "is probably the most "pop" of all the songs on offer here. It's another love song and Blige softens her tone a little to keep everything sweet." Havelock Nelson from Entertainment Weekly named it "a jazzy remake".

=== Credits and personnel ===
Credits adapted from the What's the 411? liner notes.

- Sean "Puffy" Combs – executive producer
- Charlie Davis – executive producer
- Mark Morales – producer
- Mark C. Rooney – producer
- Kurt Woodley – executive producer

=== Track listing ===
- US cassette/7" vinyl single
1. "Sweet Thing" – 3:44
2. "Slow Down" – 4:30
- US CD promo
1. "Sweet Thing" (live) – 3:45
2. "Sweet Thing" (album version) – 3:44
3. "Sweet Thing" (TV) – 4:45

- US 12" vinyl promo

A1. "Sweet Thing" (live version) – 3:45
A2. "Sweet Thing" (album version) – 3:44
B1. "Sweet Thing" (Daddy Hip Hop) – 5:05
B2. "Sweet Thing" (Daddy Hip Hop TV) – 4:45

=== Charts ===
==== Weekly charts ====
Chart (1993)	Peak position
New Zealand (Recorded Music NZ)	48
US Billboard Hot 100	28
US Hot R&B/Hip-Hop Songs (Billboard)	11
US Pop Airplay (Billboard)	28
US Rhythmic Airplay (Billboard)	4
US Cash Box Top 100	19

==== Year-end charts ====
Chart (1993)	Position
US Hot R&B/Hip-Hop Songs (Billboard)	62

== Other cover versions ==
In 1997, contemporary jazz saxophonist Boney James did another remake of the song; it was included on the album titled Sweet Thing. The album's title track included background vocals by original co-writer Tony Maiden. UK soul singer Beverley Knight has also recorded a version of the song. Knight's version was recorded for a BBC Radio 2 session and was included as the B-side to her 2004 single "Not Too Late for Love". Due to the popularity of Knight's version with her fans, it was later included on her Voice - The Best of Beverley Knight (2006) compilation. Knight has since been invited to perform the song at Khan's London O2 Arena date on her UK tour, after collaborating with the singer on her Blige duet "Disrespectful" at the Montreux Jazz Festival. Filipina pop/R&B singer Nina Girado also performed her own version of this song, which served as the opening track of her 2005 album Nina Live!, which was recorded live and eventually received a diamond certification for selling over one million copies in the Philippines.
