= Day 1 (album) =

Studio album by Robbie Nevil
- Released: July 30, 1991
- Studio: Aire L.A. Studios (Glendale, California): Garden Rake Studios (Sherman Oaks, California); Red Line (Studio City, California); A Studio and A&M Studios (Hollywood, California); Larrabee Sound Studios (North Hollywood, California); Sound Castle Recorders (Los Angeles, California)
- Genre: Rock, pop rock
- Length: 49:34
- Label: EMI; CDP-7-91067
- Producer: Robbie Nevil

Robbie Nevil chronology
A Place Like This (1988)	Day 1 (1991)

Professional ratings
Review scores
Source	Rating
Allmusic	3/5 stars

Day 1 is Robbie Nevil's third (and, to date, final) studio album, released in 1991.

== Track listing ==
1. "Introduction" – 0:39
2. "Just Like You" (Robbie Nevil) - 4:05
3. "For Your Mind" (Nevil, Steve Dubin) - 3:47
4. "Do You Miss Me" (Nevil) - 4:21
5. "Temptation" (feat. Rose Stone and Larry Graham) (Nevil, Steve Dubin, Kevin Savigar, Jeff Pescetto) - 4:26
6. "Tell Me Something Good" (Stevie Wonder) - 3:41
7. "What Everybody Wants" (Nevil, Tommy Faragher, Lotti Golden) - 4:36
8. "Goin' Through the Motions" (Nevil, Mark Mueller) - 3:18
9. "Partners in Crime" (Nevil, John Peart Charles) - 4:34
10. "Welcome to the Party" (Nevil, Tommy Faragher, Lotti Golden)- 4:15
11. "Paradise" (Nevil) - 3:01
12. "Sensual" (Nevil, Steve Dubin, Mark Mueller) - 4:36
13. "Same Ole Song" (Nevil) - 4:08
14. "Bad Habit" (Nevil, Steve Dubin, Kevin Savigar) - 3:21 (Japan release only)

== Personnel ==
- Robbie Nevil – lead vocals (2–10, 12–14), all guitars, keyboards (6), all vocals (11), Roland guitar synthesizer (12)
- Tommy Faragher – keyboards (1–3, 5, 7, 10), additional keyboards (4, 9, 12)
- Kevin Savigar – Hammond organ (2, 4, 5, 7, 13), additional keyboards (9, 10), keyboards (14)
- Terry Marshall – keyboards (3), additional keyboards (4, 10, 12)
- J.P. Charles – keyboard programming (4, 9), drum programming (4, 6, 9), backing vocals (9), drums (13)
- John Van Tongeren – additional keyboards (7, 12)
- Neil Stubenhaus – funk bass (2), funk bass intro and fills (3), fuzz bass (5), additional bass (6, 10)
- Jimmy Johnson – fretless bass (3, 7, 12)
- Greg St. Regis – bass (3), additional bass programming (5, 9, 12)
- Steve Dubin – drum programming (2, 3, 5, 7, 10, 12, 14), keyboard programming (7, 12)
- Brian Kilgore – percussion (2–10, 12)
- Mark Via – DJ (6)
- Kristen Lynn Akai – cello (8)
- Voncielle Faggett – backing vocals (2–8, 10, 12, 13)
- Mona Lisa Young – backing vocals (2–5)
- Rheji Burrell – backing vocals (2, 3, 6, 12)
- Tommy Funderburk – backing vocals (2, 9)
- Richard Landers – backing vocals (2)
- Jeff Pescetto – backing vocals (2, 5, 7, 9, 10, 12)
- Alfie Silas – chorus vocals (4), backing vocals (7, 10, 12)
- Jim Gilstrap – backing vocals (5)
- Laura Hunter – backing vocals (5, 7), chorus lead vocals (13)
- Larry Graham – lead vocals (5)
- Rose Stone – lead vocals (5)
- Suzie Benson – backing vocals (7)
- Tony DeFranco – backing vocals (7)
- Alice Johnson – backing vocals (7)
- Joe Bissett – backing vocals (9), bass (13)

=== Production ===
- Ron Fair – executive producer
- Robbie Nevil – producer
- Steve Dubin – associate production (5, 12)
- J.P. Charles – associate production (9)
- Barry Rudolph – engineer, mixing (6)
- Craig Burbidge – basic track engineer (1–5, 7–12, 14)
- Francis Buckley – basic track engineer (6)
- Mikal Reid – basic track engineer (13)
- Dan Garcia – additional engineer
- Ernie Sheesley – additional engineer
- John Aguto – assistant engineer
- Gregg Barrett – assistant engineer
- Ed Goodreau – assistant engineer
- Bob Lacivita – assistant engineer
- Richard Landers – assistant engineer
- Greg Loskorn – assistant engineer
- Patrick MacDougall – assistant engineer
- Mike Scotella – assistant engineer
- Jon Gass – mixing (1–5, 9, 10, 12, 14), additional mixing (6)
- Donnell Sullivan – mix assistant (1–5, 9, 10, 12, 14)
- Hugh Padgham – mixing (7)
- Michael H. Brauer – mixing (8, 11, 13)
- Ted Jensen – mastering at Sterling Sound (New York, NY)
- Tony DeFranco – production coordinator
- Clyde Lieberman – A&R consultant
- Henry Marquez – art direction
- Lu Ann Graffeo – design
- Victoria Pearson Cameron – photography
- Gary Stamler – management

== Charts ==
Chart performance for Day 1
Chart (1991)	Peak position
Australian Albums (ARIA)	89
