= This Is Serious =

Studio album by Marilyn Martin
- Released: March 1988
- Genre: Pop rock, soft rock, synthpop
- Length: 40:04
- Label: Atlantic
- Producer: Michael Verdick, Patrick Leonard (track 1); Jon Astley (tracks 2–9); Terry Brown (track 10)

Marilyn Martin chronology
Marilyn Martin (1986)	This Is Serious (1988)	Trust, Love, Pray (2012)

This Is Serious is the second solo studio album by American singer Marilyn Martin. Except for two tracks, the album was produced entirely by Jon Astley, who had also produced some of Martin's debut album. Michael Verdick and Patrick Leonard produced "Possessive Love", and Terry Brown produced the album's closing track "Pretender".

The album's lead single was "Possessive Love", which was co-written by Madonna and Patrick Leonard, but failed to chart. A second single, "Love Takes No Prisoners," written by Bruce Woolley and Jimmy Scott, was released to similar commercial failure.

== Background ==
The Jimmy O'Neill-penned track "This Is Serious" had previously been submitted to other artists and recorded twice before The Silencers' version on their 1991 album Dance to the Holy Man. In 1987 Eric Martin recorded it for his I'm Only Fooling Myself album, and then one year later Martin recorded it for her 1988 album, which took its name from the track.

Around May 1987, Astley, an airplane fanatic, was reported to have been arrested at the Nellis Air Force Base air show in Las Vegas after taking some photographs. After the misunderstanding was sorted out, he returned to Los Angeles where he was in the middle of producing the This Is Serious album.

== Release ==
The album was released via Atlantic Records on vinyl, CD and cassette in the US, Germany and Japan, while WEA Records, S.A. released the album in Spain. In 2006 Wounded Bird Records re-issued the album on CD, following the 2005 re-issue of Martin's debut album.

Today, the album's re-issue remains in print, unlike the 2005 Marilyn Martin re-issue. The album can be purchased as a digital download on sites such as Amazon and iTunes.

== Critical reception ==
Professional ratings
Review scores
Source	Rating
AllMusic	3/5 stars
Philadelphia Inquirer	3/4 stars

The album received a good critical reception, regardless that it did not chart. Alex Henderson of AllMusic noted that Martin wanted a different production style for her second album. While her first album had a very slick, high-tech, synthesizer-driven sound, this album favored a more organic production style. Still, in terms of the songs themselves, this release was not all that radical a departure from her first album. Martin was still aiming to be a commercial, radio-friendly pop/rock vocalist. Her appreciation for R&B showed up on tracks like "Try Me", the title song, and the single "Possessive Love". "This Is Serious had the makings of a hit," Henderson wrote, "Even though 'Marilyn Martin' is the more essential of her two albums, 'This Is Serious' is also quite enjoyable."

In The Philadelphia Inquirer of May 29, 1988, a review of the album stated "Martin has built a career as a backup singer for many artists, including Linda Ronstadt and Stevie Nicks. The usual problem when a good backup singer performs as a lead singer is that she's so used to subsuming her vocal personality to another that the result is technically perfect but bland music. Martin neatly avoids this trap by permitting the rough edges in her voice to surface and by singing in an intimate, conversational tone. It helps, too, that with the exception of a few bombastic ballads, her material is strong pop-rock."

== Track listing ==
This Is Serious track listing
No.	Title	Writer(s)	Length
1.	"Possessive Love"	Patrick Leonard; Madonna; Jai Winding	4:17
2.	"This Is Serious"	Jimmy O'Neill	4:03
3.	"The Best Is Yet to Come"	Terry Britten; Graham Lyle	3:53
4.	"Quiet Desperation"	Marilyn Martin; Jon Astley; Jay Gruska	5:16
5.	"Lay Me Down"	Sue Shifrin; Bob Marlette	4:00
6.	"Love Takes No Prisoners"	Bruce Woolley; Jimmy Scott	3:54
7.	"Try Me"	Martin; Mark Goldberg	3:47
8.	"The Wait Is Over"	Paul Gordon; Gruska	3:39
9.	"Homeless"	Martin; Astley; Billy Nichols	3:37
10.	"Pretender"	Bob Mitchell; James Kaleth	4:07

== Personnel ==
- Marilyn Martin – vocals
- Jon Astley – producer (tracks 2–9)
- Michael Verdick – producer (track 1)
- Patrick Leonard – producer (track 1)
- Terry Brown – producer (track 10)
