= Alex Nevil =

American film and television actor

- Born: January 25, 1965 (age 61); Los Angeles, California, U.S.
- Occupations: Film and television actor
- Years active: 1986–present
- Spouse: Allyson Nevil (m. 2001)
- Family: Robbie Nevil (brother)

Alex Nevil (born January 25, 1965) is an American film and television actor. He is known for portraying the role of Rebecca Howe's lecherous young boss Martin Teal in the American sitcom television series Cheers. Born in Los Angeles. Nevil guest-starred in television programs including Married... with Children, The Nanny and Family Matters.
