= Night Moves (Marilyn Martin song) =

1986 song by Marilyn Martin

Single by Marilyn Martin

from the album Marilyn Martin
- B-side: "Wildest Dreams"
- Released: January 1986
- Length: 5:18 (album version); 4:24 (single version)
- Label: Atlantic
- Songwriters: Marilyn Martin; John Parr; Jon Astley
- Producers: Jon Astley; Phil Chapman

Marilyn Martin singles chronology
"Separate Lives" (1985)	"Night Moves" (1986)	"Move Closer" (1986)

Performance video
- "Night Moves" by Marilyn Martin (at TopPop) on YouTube

"Night Moves" is a song by American singer Marilyn Martin, which was released in 1986 as the lead single from her debut studio album Marilyn Martin. The song was written by Martin, John Parr and Jon Astley and produced by Astley and Phil Chapman. "Night Moves" peaked at No. 28 on the US Billboard Hot 100.

== Background ==
"Night Moves" followed the success of "Separate Lives", a duet Martin recorded with Phil Collins in 1985 for the soundtrack of the film White Nights. "Separate Lives" peaked at No. 1 on the US Billboard Hot 100 and Canada RPM 100, and reached the top 5 in the UK Singles Chart. "Night Moves" continued Martin's commercial success, reaching No. 28 on the Billboard Hot 100 in March 1986, but was her last entry in the chart.

In 1986, Martin revealed to Cash Box of the decision to release "Night Moves" as the first single from her debut album:

I think aggressive is the best word to describe my style. Aggressive music with a rock edge is what I tend to like most. That's primarily the reason we came out with a rock-oriented cut like 'Night Moves' as the first single, because it's exactly the sort of song I like recording most at this point.

Speaking to Songfacts in 2016, co-writer John Parr recalled of the song:

We were working on another track and during the break we were just running a few ideas and out came that song. Jon Astley later came aboard as producer and gave it a far more generic '80s vibe. Jon's a great producer but personally I think it dates the song when you listen now.

== Music video ==
The song's music video was directed by Jim Yukich and produced by Paul Flattery, both of whom had previously worked with Martin on the video for "Separate Lives". The video for "Night Moves" received heavy rotation on MTV, and peaked at No. 9 on the Cash Box Top 30 Music Videos chart in April 1986.

The video shows Martin singing in various scenes while killing men during dates in the main story. Later in the story, young boys playing a football encounter a basement filled with her dead victims hanging and mummified, including a few of which reported missing to and then discovered by the police. In the end, Martin, wearing her sunglasses and hooded coat, walks on daylight away from the apartment building, whose main entrance is blocked for investigation and crowded by bystanders.

Martin said of the video in a 1986 interview with the New York Daily News:

I love the video. It's based on one of my favorite movies, The Hunger. I've always loved scary movies... and it's tough for a girl to be shocking in videos. Michael Jackson can become a werewolf, but girls don't. I even got to put in a few suggestions of my own, like the scene where I tilt a head so I can bite the neck. I thought that was necessary to show I was just a vampire, not a mass murderer.

In addition to the video, Martin performed "Night Moves" on American Bandstand, which was broadcast on March 29, 1986. She also performed the song on the Dutch television programme TopPop.

== Critical reception ==
On its release, Billboard described the song as a "two-fisted rocker" which "could easily pass for a leaf from the Benatar songbook". Jan DeKnock of the Chicago Tribune wrote, "On 'Night Moves', Martin displays another side to her voice, showing enough rock power to rival Pat Benatar (their high notes sound eerily alike)." Music & Media picked the song as one of their "records of the week" during February 1986 and described it as "a very strong AOR-based song that could do very well in Europe". They added, "The single is definitely not a continuation of the sound on 'Separate Lives'. [It] features a vocal cross section between Pat Benatar and Olivia Newton-John".

Paul Henderson of Kerrang! praised it as a "well-written song", noting the "great chord changes", "powerful raunchy vocal" and "guitar playing that will set a few heads nodding their appreciation". He considered it to be "much more inspiring" than 'Separate Lives', adding "you'd be hard-pushed to recognise it as the same voice", and concluded that it's "a forceful invitation to take a listen to the album". Jim Schembri of The Age described it as "a prim, catchy atmosphere piece about sex". He added, "The slightly bizarre bent of the lyrics are given free reign[sic] in the terrific [video] which is an economy sized thriller with a wonderfully gruesome surprise ending."

== Track listing ==
7–inch single

1. "Night Moves" – 4:24
2. "Wildest Dreams" – 4:29

7–inch single (US promo)

1. "Night Moves" – 4:24
2. "Night Moves" – 4:24

12–inch single (UK and Germany release)

1. "Night Moves" – 5:18
2. "Wildest Dreams" – 4:29

12–inch single (US promo)

1. "Night Moves" (Vocal/Faded LP Version) – 4:24
2. "Night Moves" (Vocal/Faded LP Version) – 4:24

== Personnel ==
Production

- Jon Astley, Phil Chapman – producers
- George Marino – mastering

Other

- Brian Aris – photography

== Charts ==
Chart (1986)	Peak position
Canada Top Singles (RPM)	72
UK Singles Chart	154
US Billboard Hot 100	28
US Mainstream Rock (Billboard)	18
US Cash Box Top 100 Singles	27
