= Dominoes (Robbie Nevil song) =

Single by Robbie Nevil

from the album Robbie Nevil
- A-side: "Dominoes" (Extended vocal remix) Remix by Arthur Baker; "Dominoes" (Dom Dom Domino dub); Remix by Arthur Baker
- B-side: "Neighbors"
- Released: 1986
- Genre: Pop
- Length: 3:45 (single edit); 4:46 (album version)
- Label: Manhattan Records
- Songwriters: Bobby Hart; Dick Eastman; Robbie Nevil
- Producers: Alex Sadkin; Philip Thornalley

Robbie Nevil singles chronology
""C'est la Vie"" (1986)	"Dominoes" (1986)	""Wot's It to Ya"" (1987)

"Dominoes" is a song by American singer Robbie Nevil from his self-titled debut album in 1986.

Written by Nevil with Bobby Hart and Dick Eastman, Nevil recorded the song for his eponymous debut album, and it was released as the second single in a shorter version remixed by Arthur Baker. It reached #14 on the U.S. singles chart and #26 on the Canadian singles chart. MTV featured a portion of the refrain with reworked lyrics to promote their new show at the time, Friday Night Party Zone.

== Track listing ==
=== A-Side ===
1. "Dominoes (Extended Vocal Remix)" Remix By Arthur Baker - 6:05
2. "Dominoes (Dom Dom Domino Dub)". Remix by Arthur Baker - 7:23

=== B-Side ===
1. "Neighbors" - 3:50

== Charts ==
=== Weekly charts ===
Chart (1987)	Peak position
Italy Airplay (Music & Media)	5
