= Trust, Love, Pray =

Studio album by Marilyn Martin
- Released: September 14, 2012
- Genres: Pop; contemporary christian
- Length: 36:42
- Producer: Greg Droman

Marilyn Martin chronology
This is Serious (1988)	Trust, Love, Pray (2012)	Through His Eyes (2024)

Trust, Love, Pray is the fourth studio album by American singer Marilyn Martin, released independently on September 14, 2012. The album is a collection of original songs of trials, temptations, love, and faith.

All of the album's songs were written solely by Martin, except "In the Arms of God" which was written by Eric Kaz and Martin. The album was produced, engineered and mixed by Martin's husband Greg Droman. Hank Williams mastered the album at Mastermix, Nashville. The song "Every Way And Always" received airplay on Christian and Praise and Worship stations.

== Background ==
Trust, Love, Pray was Martin's first released studio album since 1988's This Is Serious. Describing the songs as "written purely from my heart", Martin originally put her solo career on halt in the 1990s. She recalled to Breathe Cast: "For several years I just didn't have the heart to try to write or sing". However, when her husband introduced her to the music software GarageBand, she began writing new material. Happy to be writing and singing again, Martin did not initially consider releasing a new album.

The album, released independently by Martin, was issued digitally and on digipack CD. The CD edition was released in America only, via outlets online such as CDBaby and Amazon. In late 2012, Martin used Kickstarter in an attempt to gain funding of $10,000 to market and promote the album. This included distribution, internet promotion and a possible tour. However, by mid-January 2013, the 45-day funding period only gained $1,230 through 12 backers.

== Track listing ==
All tracks written by Marilyn Martin, except "In the Arms of God", co-written with Eric Kaz.

No.	Title	Length
1.	"In the Arms of God"	4:11
2.	"Dear God"	4:16
3.	"Every Way and Always"	3:15
4.	"In My Fathers House"	3:29
5.	"Amen"	3:25
6.	"More Than a Dream"	3:12
7.	"Stop and Listen"	3:17
8.	"Heart of the King"	3:34
9.	"Trust, Love, Pray"	3:11
10.	"I Never Knew You"	5:01

== Critical reception ==
Professional ratings
Review scores
Source	Rating
Breathe Cast	favorable

Timothy Yap of Breathe Cast reviewed the album in 2013, writing: "A buffet of styles, there is much to enjoy here: from string-laden big balladry to jaunty soul-filled funk to straight ahead vintage pop. Though the songs are deftly written, some of them lack defining hooks that could grab the listener with greater immediacy. If only Martin could polish up the hooks and make them more prominent, the album would be even greater. Also, the central ideas of some of the songs are not strong enough; for example, "In My Father's House" utilizes a rich Biblical imagery, it would be greater served if the imagery could be expounded more in the song. Other than these quibbles, it is such a joy to have Marilyn Martin back. Though she was great singing about heartbreak with Phil Collins in "Separate Lives," when she sings for the Lord, she sounds even better."

== Personnel ==
- Marilyn Martin – vocals
- Greg Droman – guitar, bass, engineer, mixer, producer
- Kristin Wilkinson – string arrangement
- Kristin Wilkinson, Sari Reist, David Angell, David Davidson – strings (track 2)
- Eric Darken – percussion (tracks 4, 9)
- Hank Williams – mastering
