= Robbie Nevil (album) =

Studio album by Robbie Nevil
- Released: November 11, 1986
- Recorded: 1985–1986
- Genres: Pop, dance-pop
- Length: 41:59
- Label: Manhattan
- Producer: Alex Sadkin: Phil Thornalley

Robbie Nevil chronology
Robbie Nevil (1986)	A Place Like This (1988)

Singles from Robbie Nevil
- 1. "C'est la Vie" Released: October 1986; 2. "Dominoes" Released: February 1987; 3. "Wot's It to Ya" Released: May 1987

Professional ratings
Review scores
Source	Rating
AllMusic	4/5 stars

Robbie Nevil is Robbie Nevil's first album, released in 1986. It peaked at #37 on the Billboard 200, remaining on the chart for 46 weeks. The album produced three Billboard Top 20 pop singles: "C'est la Vie" (#2), "Dominoes" (#14) and "Wot's It to Ya" (#10). In the United Kingdom, the album was retitled C'est La Vie after the single reached Number 3 on the Gallup UK Singles Chart, with the album becoming a small hit when it peaked at Number 93 in June 1987.

== Track listing ==
1. "Just a Little Closer" (Mark Mueller, Nevil) – 3:58
2. "Dominoes" (Bobby Hart, Dick Eastman, Nevil) – 4:46
3. "Limousines" (Mark Mueller, Nevil, Tommy Faragher) – 3:55
4. "Back to You" (Brock Walsh, Nevil) – 4:07
5. "C'est la Vie" (Duncan Pain, Nevil, Mark Holding) – 4:29
6. "Wot's It to Ya" (Brock Walsh, Nevil) – 3:47
7. "Walk Your Talk" (Duncan Pain, Nevil) – 3:40
8. "Simple Life (Mambo Luv Thang)" (Brock Walsh, Mark Goldenberg, Nevil) – 5:19
9. "Neighbors" (David Krems, Keith Steinbaum, Nevil) – 3:35
10. "Look Who's Alone Tonight" (John Van Tongeren, Phil Galdston, Nevil) – 4:18

== Personnel ==
=== Musicians ===
- Robbie Nevil – vocals, all guitars, keyboards on "Back to You"
- Tommy Faragher – keyboards, bass, backing vocals
- John Van Tongeren – keyboards, bass on "Look Who's Alone Tonight"
- Boris Williams – hi-hat
- Mike Nocito – cymbals
- Frank Ricotti – percussion
- Alex Sadkin – environmental percussion on "Back to You"
- Ian Ritchie – saxophone on "C'est la Vie"
- Judd Lander – harmonica solo on "Wot's It to Ya"
- Elaine Griffiths, Fiona Griffiths, Carol Kenyon, Stevie Lange, Chris Thompson, Miriam Stockley – backing vocals

=== Production ===
- Produced and mixed by Alex Sadkin for Peregine Productions, Inc. and Phil Thornalley for Voodoo, Ltd
- Recorded and engineered by Phil Thornalley
- Assistant recording engineer – Nick Lacey
- Mix assistant – Matt Barry
- Recorded and mixed at RAK Studios (St. John's Wood, London, England)
- Design – Paula Scher for Koppel & Scher
- Photography – Duane Michaels
- Creative direction – Ken Baumstein

== Certifications ==
Certifications for Robbie Nevil
Region	Certification	Certified units/sales
Canada (Music Canada)	Gold	50,000^{^}
^{^} Shipments figures based on certification alone.
