= Once You Get Started =

Single by Rufus featuring Chaka Khan

from the album Rufusized
- B-side: "Rufusized"
- Released: February 1975
- Recorded: 1974
- Genre: Disco; pop; funk
- Length: 3:27 (single version); 4:29 (album version)
- Label: ABC
- Songwriter: Gavin Christopher
- Producers: Bob Monaco; Rufus

Rufus featuring Chaka Khan singles chronology
"You Got the Love" (1974)	"Once You Get Started" (1975)	"Please Pardon Me (You Remind Me of a Friend)" (1975)

"Once You Get Started" is a horn-driven funk number written by musician Gavin Christopher, and recorded and released by the band Rufus featuring Chaka Khan in late 1974. The song is led mostly by Khan, though fellow group member Tony Maiden contributed lead vocals for the song's second verse. It helped to make their third album Rufusized go platinum. "Once You Get Started", peaked at number ten on the Billboard Hot 100 in 1975, giving the group their second top ten single and third top forty single overall. The song also hit number-four on the Hot Soul Singles chart as well as number six on the Record World, Disco File Top 20 chart.

== Covers and samples ==
Christopher later recorded his own version of the song on his 1986 solo album, One Step Closer.

Chaka Khan re-recorded a version for the deluxe version of her 2007 album Funk This.

Vicki Anderson also recorded a version of this song with Christopher singing background vocals, released in June 1974.

The song was sampled in Raw Man's 1999 song "Number Seven".

== Credits ==
- Chaka Khan - lead vocals; background vocals
- Tony Maiden - guitar; co-lead vocals; background vocals
- Kevin Murphy - keyboards; background vocals
- Andre Fischer - drums; background vocals
- Bobby Watson - bass; background vocals
- Tower of Power - horns
