= Street Player =

1978 studio album by Rufus & Chaka Khan

Studio album by Rufus & Chaka Khan
- Released: January 17, 1978
- Recorded: 1977
- Studio: Dawnbreaker (San Fernando)
- Genre: Funk; soul
- Length: 40:32
- Label: ABC; AA 1049
- Producer: Rufus, Roy Halee

Rufus chronology
Ask Rufus (with Chaka Khan) (1977)	Street Player (with Chaka Khan) (1978)	Numbers (1979)

Chaka Khan chronology
Ask Rufus (with Rufus) (1977)	Street Player (with Rufus) (1978)	Chaka (1978)

Professional ratings
Review scores
Source	Rating
AllMusic	2.5/5 stars
Record Mirror	4/5 stars
Rolling Stone	(not rated)
The Rolling Stone Album Guide	3/5 stars

Street Player is the sixth studio album by funk band Rufus (and their fourth album featuring singer Chaka Khan), released on the ABC Records label in 1978. Street Player was the band's third album to top Billboard's R&B Albums chart and also reached number 14 on Pop. The album includes the singles "Stay" (US R&B number 3, US Pop number 38) and "Blue Love" (US R&B number 34).

== History ==
In 1978, Rufus and Chaka Khan were a top-selling band. Their last four releases had gone platinum and the group continued to sell out in arenas as a headlining act with fiery Khan leading the way. By this point, Khan's stardom outside the group had grown and it led to the group drifting apart. While Khan opted to stay a member of the group, other members were uncomfortable that Khan was now offered solo contracts.

After the release of this record, Khan would sign a solo deal with Warner Bros. Records releasing her debut album, featuring the hit "I'm Every Woman". While Khan went on to a solo career, Rufus cut Numbers, in 1979, without her. Khan, however, didn't leave the group, returning for their Quincy Jones-produced Masterjam later that same year.

Also after the departure of original drummer Andre Fischer, Richard "Moon" Calhoun took over on this album on drums. This would be his only album with the group. Additionally, the jazz/rock band Chicago featured a version of the title track on their 1979 album Chicago 13, with Peter Cetera on lead vocals. The song was co-written by Chicago's drummer at that time, Danny Seraphine. The track "Stay" was covered by Erykah Badu on her 1997 album Live.

== Track listing ==
Side one
No.	Title	Writer(s)	Length
1.	"Street Player"	David Wolinski, Daniel Seraphine	4:54
2.	"Stay"	Richard Calhoun, Chaka Khan	5:41
3.	"Turn"	Bobby Watson, Wolinski	4:43
4.	"Best of Your Heart"	Watson, Wolinski	3:45
5.	"Finale" (Instrumental)	Watson, Wolinski	2:10

Side two
No.	Title	Writer(s)	Length
6.	"Blue Love"	Calhoun, Wolinski	3:18
7.	"Stranger to Love"	Wolinski	3:33
8.	"Take Time" (Instrumental)	Tony Maiden	4:16
9.	"Destiny"	David Batteau, Richard Holland	4:25
10.	"Change Your Ways"	Maiden, Traude Sapik	3:27

The listing of tracks on the back of the album as distributed in Canada (GRT of Canada Ltd.) is in the following order:

- Destiny
- Stranger To Love
- Street Player
- Stay
- Best Of Your Heart
- Finale
- Take Time
- Blue Love
- Turn
- Change Your Ways

The listing on the album labels (sides 1 & 2) is as on the main listing.

== Personnel ==
- Chaka Khan – lead vocals, background vocals
- Tony Maiden – guitar, percussion, lead vocals, background vocals
- Kevin Murphy – keyboards
- Bobby Watson – bass, percussion
- David "Hawk" Wolinski – keyboards, background vocals
- Richard "Moon" Calhoun – drums, percussion, background vocals
- Jerry Hey – trumpet, flugelhorn
- Larry Williams – saxophone, flute, piccolo
- Kim Hutchcroft – saxophone, flute
- Bill Reichenbach Jr. – trombone
- Helen Lowe – additional background vocals
- Everett Bryson, Jr. – percussion

== Production ==
- Rufus, Roy Halee – producers
- Roy Halee, George Belle – engineers
- Clare Fischer – string arrangements & conductor
- Seawind, Rufus – horn arrangements
- Brian Gardner – audio mastering

== Charts ==
Album

Chart (1978)	Peak
U.S. Billboard Top LPs	14
U.S. Billboard Top Soul LPs	1

Singles

Year	Single	Peak chart positions	
Year	Single	US	US R&B
1978	"Stay"	38	3
1978	"Blue Love"	105	34

== Certifications ==
Region	Certification	Certified units/sales
United States (RIAA)	Gold	500,000^{^}
^{^} Shipments figures based on certification alone.

== See also ==
- List of Billboard number-one R&B albums of 1978
