= Possessive Love =

1988 song by Marilyn Martin

Single by Marilyn Martin

from the album This Is Serious
- B-side: "Homeless"
- Released: February 1988
- Length: 4:14
- Label: Atlantic
- Songwriters: Patrick Leonard; Madonna; Jai Winding
- Producers: Patrick Leonard; Michael Verdick

Marilyn Martin singles chronology
"Body and the Beat" (1986)	"Possessive Love" (1988)	"Love Takes No Prisoners" (1988)

"Possessive Love" is a song by American singer Marilyn Martin, released by Atlantic in February 1988 as the lead single from her second studio album, This Is Serious. The song was written by Patrick Leonard, Madonna and Jai Winding, and was produced by Leonard and Michael Verdick.

== Background ==
"Possessive Love" was specifically written for Marilyn Martin to record. Patrick Leonard, one of Madonna's collaborators at the time, met Martin when she was seeking a producer for her second studio album and he suggested to Madonna that they write a song for her. Marilyn told Rolling Stone in 2023, "I think he just went to her and said, 'Let's write a song for Marilyn Martin.' According to him, her first question was, 'Is she nice?' He went, 'Yeah. She's nice.' And so that came about." In a 2017 interview with Boy Culture, Leonard said, "I think 'Possessive Love' was just me asking [Madonna] a favor."

Martin met Madonna in person later in 1988 after she was invited by Leonard to provide backing vocals on Madonna's song "Cherish" during the sessions for her album Like a Prayer (1989).

== Release ==
In the US, "Possessive Love" was released in February 1988 and was a commercial disappointment, failing to enter the Billboard Hot 100 or the Cash Box Top 100 Singles charts, although it did generate radio airplay. During March 1988, it appeared in Radio & Records magazine's "significant action" listings for national contemporary hit radio and in Gavin Report magazine's 'Up & Coming' listings for top 40 radio.

"Possessive Love" was issued as a single in the UK on 28 March 1988. It failed to reach the top 100 of the UK Singles Chart, but did make an appearance for two consecutives weeks on the Music Week Airplay chart in April 1988 based on the airplay it received from regional radio stations.

== Music video ==
The song's music video achieved medium rotation on MTV and light rotation on VH1.

== Critical reception ==
Upon its release as a single, Billboard praised "Possessive Love" as a "strong pop item" that "may get Martin the solo attention she deserves" and "should once and for all break her out of the middle-of-the-road mold". Cash Box noted the single "allows Marilyn to venture further into the world of funk-pop" and believed that, following the success of "Separate Lives", her 1985 duet with Phil Collins, the "energetic and hooky tune should place her again at the top of the pops".

Pan-European magazine Music & Media considered it to be a "rocking pop song, sung with [a] raucous, powerful voice". The reviewer noted that the "carefree bounciness and sparkle are not much of a surprise" due to Leonard and Verdick's involvement as producers and continued, "Contagious and radio friendly, that is for sure; but the composition itself falls a bit short." In the UK, the Fife Free Press remarked that the "delicious Marilyn Martin could well break her solo duck with the memorable 'Possessive Love'". In his 1989 book Madonna: The Biography, writer Robert Matthew-Walker noted that Martin "has a voice not unlike Madonna's".

== Track listing ==
7–inch single (US, UK, Europe and Japan) and CD single (Japan)

1. "Possessive Love" – 4:14
2. "Homeless" – 3:35

12–inch single (UK and Europe)

1. "Possessive Love" (extended version) – 6:15
2. "Possessive Love" – 4:14
3. "Homeless" – 3:35

== Personnel ==
"Possessive Love"

- Marilyn Martin – vocals
- Jai Winding – keyboards
- James David Hurrah – guitar
- David Williams – guitar
- Kerry E. Hatch – bass
- Jonathan Moffett – drums
- Paulinho da Costa – percussion
- Gina Haire – backing vocals
- Donna De Lory – backing vocals

Production

- Patrick Leonard – production ("Possessive Love")
- Michael Verdick – production and engineering ("Possessive Love")
- Michael Blum – engineering ("Possessive Love")
- Mick Guzauski – mixing ("Possessive Love")
- Jon Astley – production ("Homeless")
- Stephen Marcussen – mastering ("Possessive Love", "Homeless")

Other

- Aaron Rapoport – photography
- Bob Defrin – art direction
- Jodi Rovin – design
