= Marilyn Martin =

American recording artist; singer (born 1954)

- Also known as: "Minnie"
- Born: May 4, 1954 (age 72); Tennessee, U.S.
- Origin: Louisville, Kentucky, U.S.
- Genres: Pop rock; soft rock; synth-pop; country; contemporary Christian
- Occupations: Singer; songwriter
- Instrument: Vocals
- Years active: 1970–present
- Label: Atlantic
- Website: marilyn-martin.com

Marilyn Martin (born May 4, 1954) is an American singer and songwriter. She is best known for her 1985 hit duet with Phil Collins, "Separate Lives", which reached number one on several charts.

== Early life ==
Marilyn Martin was born on May 4, 1954, in Tennessee but raised in Louisville, Kentucky. She was exposed to different genres of music as a child. Her father was a country and bluegrass fan, her mother liked R&B and her grandmother sang gospel. At age 18 she started singing with different bands, eventually joining one from Akron, Ohio. After five years of club gigs, the band had an opportunity to tour with Joe Walsh, who was headlining with Stevie Nicks. Also on the tour were Michael McDonald, Boz Scaggs, and Kenny Loggins. After the tour, Martin moved to Los Angeles, California, and began a prolific career as a backing vocalist for artists including Stevie Nicks, Joe Walsh, Don Henley, Tom Petty and Kenny Loggins.

== Career ==
Martin became a protégée of Doug Morris, the then-head of Atlantic, who had heard her backing vocals on Nicks' album, Rock a Little, and was impressed enough to ask for a demo. She recorded the Nicks' song "Sorcerer" (on which Nicks sang backing vocals) for the Jim Steinman soundtrack of the 1984 film Streets of Fire. Morris signed Martin to a two-album recording contract and connected her with Phil Collins for "Separate Lives," part of the soundtrack for the 1985 film White Nights. The song was a number one hit in the U.S. and a Top 5 hit in the United Kingdom.

Martin's self-titled debut album was released in January 1986, reaching number 72 on the Billboard 200, with the single "Night Moves" reaching number 28 on the Billboard Hot 100. Two other singles were also released from the album, "Body and the Beat" and "Move Closer," but neither charted. Her second album, This Is Serious, was released in 1988, with its lead single "Possessive Love" written and produced by Madonna and Patrick Leonard. The single "Love Takes No Prisoners" was released as well, with the ballad "Quiet Desperation" as the B-side. The same year, Martin recorded the duet "And When She Danced", used in the movie Stealing Home.

Neither the singles nor the album were commercially successful, and Atlantic dropped her. She continued her career as a backing vocalist into the 1990s. In 1993, Martin moved to Nashville where she recorded a country album, Through His Eyes, for Atlantic in 1994. The album was not initially released, but was later made available through Martin's official website, until finally being officially released after 30 years in 2024.

In 1997, Martin recorded a duet "I Live for Love" with David Hasselhoff, which appears on his album Hooked on a Feeling.

On September 14, 2012, Martin released the album Trust, Love, Pray, a Christian music album featuring songs written by Martin, including "Every Way and Always", which received airplay on Christian, Praise, and Worship stations.

Marilyn reunited with Stevie Nicks in October 2016, singing backup vocals for the 24 Karat Gold Tour and filling in for Lori Nicks. She continued working with Stevie Nicks, touring as a backing vocalist with Fleetwood Mac in 2019.

== Personal life ==
Martin has been married to guitarist, music producer and engineer Greg Droman since 1976. The pair lived in Nashville in the 1990s and 2000s, where Martin was a small business owner and a real estate agent. The couple later moved to Los Angeles and as of 2023 live in Healdsburg, California.

== Discography ==
=== Studio albums ===
- Marilyn Martin (1986)
- This Is Serious (1988)
- Trust, Love, Pray (2012)
- Through His Eyes (Note: previously unreleased in 1994.) (2024)

=== Singles ===
- "Sorcerer" – 1984, Streets of Fire soundtrack
- "Separate Lives" - 1985, Duet with Phil Collins, No. 1 Billboard Hot 100 & No. 1 Adult Contemporary
- "Night Moves" - Originally released in 1985, No. 28 in 1986 Billboard Hot 100 and No. 18 Album Rock Tracks (Mainstream Rock Tracks Chart)
- "Thank You" (Japanese Bonus Track) - 1986
- "Through The Night" – 1986, Duet with John Parr, Love Song From Quicksilver
- "Move Closer" – 1986
- "Body and the Beat" – 1986
- "Possessive Love" – 1988
- "Love Takes No Prisoners" – 1988
- "And When She Danced" – 1988, Duet with David Foster (#73 Canada)
- "Your Eyes" – 1990, From Tatsuro Yamashita's Covers From Coast: The Nexus
- "A Boy's Season" – 1991
- "No Regrets" – 1992, Duet with Charles Dumont
- "Through His Eyes" – 1994
- "I Live for Love" – 1997, Duet with David Hasselhoff
