= Gavin Christopher =

American singer-songwriter (1949–2016)

- Born: 1949
- Died: 2016 (aged 66–67)
- Occupations: Musician, producer
- Formerly of: High Voltage

Gavin Christopher (May 1, 1949 – March 3, 2016) was an American R&B singer, songwriter, musician, and producer.

== Early life and career ==
Born in Chicago, Illinois, he started out playing music at a very early age. Having been schooled by the likes of Oscar Brown Jr., Donny Hathaway, Baby Huey and later on Curtis Mayfield, he honed his writing and singing skills and began his career, first in a band called Lyfe (which also included Chaka Khan). Khan then left and joined Rufus (scoring several pop and R&B hits with them). Christopher later joined another band called High Voltage with future Rufus members Bobby Watson (bassist) and Tony Maiden, as well as Lalomie Washburn, who later wrote several Rufus songs. Christopher himself would also become associated with Rufus, as he penned the song "Once You Get Started", which was later recorded by the band and hit #10 on the Billboard Hot 100 in 1975. He also wrote three songs on Rufus' next album, Rufus featuring Chaka Khan: "Dance Wit Me" (another big hit), "Fool's Paradise," and "Have A Good Time."

Christopher signed his first recording contract with Island Records. He would later move back to Los Angeles, California to record and work with Curtis Mayfield on the Curtom/RSO record label. He worked with Herbie Hancock, writing and singing on several of his albums. Christopher also penned the Hancock song, "Stars in Your Eyes". He later moved to New York City and signed with EMI Manhattan Records.

Following a move to New York City, Christopher signed with EMI Manhattan Records and scored his biggest single, "One Step Closer to You" (his only Hot 100 hit as an artist, #22 in 1986) and another major R&B hit two years later with "You Are Who You Love." He also produced music for artists such as Grandmaster Flash, Afrika Bambaataa and The Ritchie Family, as well as mentored and worked with a young Mariah Carey prior to her getting her big break. He was heavily involved in the early hip-hop scene, writing such hits as "Girls Love the Way He Spins", "Sign of the Time", "We Gonna Rock America" and "All Night All Right".

Gavin's sister is dance music vocalist Shawn Christopher.

Gavin Christopher died on March 3, 2016, in Chicago of esophagus failure at the age of 66. He is survived by his daughter Chloe Zae Jackson.

== Solo discography ==
=== Albums ===
- 1976: Gavin Christopher [1976]
- 1979: Gavin Christopher [1979]
- 1986: One Step Closer
- 1987: Gavin

=== Singles ===
- 1976: "Good Stuff"
- 1976: "Love Has a Face of Its Own"
- 1979: "Feelin' the Love" (U.S. R&B #77)
- 1985: "Best Part of the Night" (Jeff Lorber feat. Gavin Christopher)
- 1986: "One Step Closer to You" (U.S. #22, U.S. R&B #25, U.S. Dance #9, U.K. #99)
- 1986: "Back in Your Arms"
- 1988: "You Are Who You Love" (U.S. R&B #10)
- 1988: "Can't Put Out the Fire"

=== Miscellaneous appearances ===
The following is a partial listing of recordings Christopher appears on and produced

- 1979: Gavin Christopher Gavin Christopher - Percussion, Piano, Conga, Vocals, Clavinet, Producer
- 1979: Gonna Getcha Love Charles Jackson - producer' Keyboards, Vocals
- 1980: Monster Herbie Hancock - Vocals
- 1981: Magic Windows Herbie Hancock - Vocals, Bass Arrangement
- 1982: Paradise Leroy Hutson - Background Vocals
- 1985: They Said It Couldn't Be Done Grandmaster Flash - producer, Synthesizer, Bass, Percussion, Keyboards, Programming, producer, Horn Arrangements, String Arrangements, Drum Programming, Mixing, Synthesizer Bass, Simmons Drums, System Programming
- 1986: Beware (The Funk Is Everywhere) Afrika Bambaataa - Producer
- 1987: Gavin Gavin Christopher Mic MurphyDavid Frank - Keyboards, Vocals producers
- 1990: Brilliant! Kym Mazelle - Vocal Arrangement
- 1992: "Don't Lose the Magic" (Shawn Christopher) - producer, songwriter
- 1993: Club Classics 1982–1984, Vol. 1 Various Artists - producer, Arranger, producer, Mixing
- 1993: Soul Mission Soul Mission - Vocals
- 1995: Best Disco in Town: The Best of the Ritchie Family The Ritchie Family - Producer
- 1996: Adventures of Grandmaster Flash, Melle Mel & the Furi Grandmaster Flash & the Furious Five/Mel - Producer
- 1997: Too Much Woman Brigette McWilliams - Background Vocals
- 1997: Whatever Happened to the Blues Phil Upchurch - Vocals
- 2000: Best of Herbie Hancock: The Hits Herbie Hancock - Arranger, Vocals
- 2001: Breakin' Arthur Baker - Piano, Vocals
- 2001: Mr. Funk Herbie Hancock - Chant
- 2002 Bullet Proof Bruce Conte - Vocals
- 2002: Evolution Will Not Be Televised Aquabox - Vocals, Background Vocals, Produce
- 2002: Herbie Hancock Box Herbie Hancock - Vocals
- 2004: D'Soca Zone 5th Spin Various Artists - Producer
- 2006: Chicago LP Chicago's Finest - Background Vocals producer
- 2006: Definitive Groove Collection Grandmaster Flash Producer, Original Recording - Producer
- 2006: Everyday People Project Steve Harvey - Background Vocals
- 2006: Fresh and Furious: Hip Hop's Beginning Grandmaster Flash & The Furious Five - Synthesizer, Bass, Percussion, Keyboards, Programming, Tom-Toms, Gavin Christopher Producer, Horn Arrangements, String Arrangements, Mixing]
- 2007: Daily News [Circuit City Exclusive] Donnie - Background Vocals
- 2007: Daily News Donnie - Background Vocals [Gavin Christopher [Island] Gavin Christopher ] Guitar, Piano, Conga, Keyboards, Vocals, Background Vocals, Clavinet, producer
- Heat for the Feets Lee Garrett - Background Vocals
- One Step Closer Gavin Christopher - Synthesizer, Keyboards, Background Vocals, producer
- Way Ian Martin - Vocals
- 2008: Cleveland brown.

A partial list of albums Gavin Christopher's songs appear on:

- Aquabox – Evolution Will Not Be Televised
- Loletta Holloway – "Crash Goes Love" (1987)
- Beatstreet – "Breakdance"/vocals (1987)
- Average White Band – Feel No Fret
- Candy Dulfer – For the Love of You
- Kenny Dope – Strange Games and Funky Things, Vol. 3
- Grandmaster Flash – They said it couldn't be done
- Adventures of Grandmaster Flash, Melle Mel Shango funk theology
- Africa Bambatta
- Herbie Hancock – Best of Herbie Hancock: The Hits Herbie Hancock Monster
- Chaka Khan – Life Is a Dance (The Remix Project)
- Manila Thriller – Please
- Brigette McWilliams - Too Much Woman
- Rufus – Rufusized
- Rufus & Chaka Khan – Rufus Featuring Chaka Khan
- Rufus & Chaka Khan – Stompin' at the Savoy (Live)
- Original Soundtrack Prefontaine
