= C'est la Vie (Robbie Nevil song) =

1986 single by Robbie Nevil

Single by Robbie Nevil

from the album Robbie Nevil
- B-side: "Time Waits for No One"
- Released: October 1986
- Genre: Pop; R&B
- Length: 4:29 (album version)
- Label: Manhattan
- Songwriters: Robbie Nevil; Duncan Pain; Mark Holding
- Producers: Alex Sadkin; Philip Thornalley

Robbie Nevil singles chronology
"C'est la Vie" (1986)	"Dominoes" (1986)

Music video
- "C'est la vie" by Robbie Nevil on YouTube

"C'est la Vie" is a song by American singer-songwriter Robbie Nevil, from his self-titled debut album in 1986. The song was first recorded by gospel singer Beau Williams for his album Bodacious! (1984). Written by Nevil with Duncan Pain and Mark Holding, Nevil recorded the song for his self-titled debut album, and it was released as the first single.

"C'est la Vie" spent two weeks at number two on the US Billboard Hot 100 chart in January 1987 and remained in the top 40 for 16 weeks, becoming Nevil's highest-charting US hit. Additionally, the song went to number one on the Billboard Dance/Disco Club Play chart for one week in February 1987 with an Arthur Baker remix. Worldwide, the song reached number three on the UK singles chart and peaked at number one in Canada, Finland, and Switzerland.

== Track listing ==
A1. "C'est la Vie" (extended version) – 7:04
A2. "C'est la Vie" (single version) – 3:28
B1. "C'est la Vie" (dub version) – 7:07
B2. "Time Waits for No One" – 5:22

== Charts ==
=== Weekly charts ===
Weekly chart performance for "C'est la Vie"
Chart (1987)	Peak position
Australia (Kent Music Report)	4
Austria (Ö3 Austria Top 40)	4
Belgium (Ultratop 50 Flanders)	13
Canada Top Singles (RPM)	1
Europe (European Hot 100 Singles)	2
Finland (Suomen virallinen lista)	1
Ireland (IRMA)	2
Netherlands (Dutch Top 40)	16
Netherlands (Single Top 100)	18
New Zealand (Recorded Music NZ)	2
Norway (VG-lista)	4
Spain (AFYVE)	7
Sweden (Sverigetopplistan)	2
Switzerland (Schweizer Hitparade)	1
UK Singles (Official Charts)	3
US Billboard Hot 100	2
US 12-inch Singles Sales (Billboard) Remix	3
US Adult Contemporary (Billboard)	37
US Dance/Disco Club Play (Billboard) Remix	1
West Germany (GfK)	2

=== Year-end charts ===
Year-end chart performance for "C'est la Vie"
Chart (1987)	Rank
Australia (Australian Music Report)	43
Canada Top Singles (RPM)	27
Europe (European Hot 100 Singles)	42
New Zealand (RIANZ)	23
UK Singles (OCC)	95
US Billboard Hot 100	6
US 12-inch Singles Sales (Billboard)	30
US Dance Club Play (Billboard)	18
West Germany (Media Control)	36

== Certifications ==
Certifications for "C'est la Vie"
Region	Certification	Certified units/sales
Canada (Music Canada)	Gold	50,000^{^}
^{^} Shipments figures based on certification alone.

== See also ==
- List of number-one dance hits (United States)
