= Marilyn Martin (album) =

Studio album by Marilyn Martin
- Released: January 1986
- Genre: Pop rock
- Length: 44:32
- Label: Atlantic
- Producers: Jon Astley; Phil Chapman; Arif Mardin; Simon Climie; Gary Stevenson; John Parr; Phil Ramone

Marilyn Martin chronology
Marilyn Martin (1986)	This Is Serious (1988)

Marilyn Martin is the debut studio album by American singer Marilyn Martin, released in January 1986 by Atlantic Records. The album's various producers include Jon Astley, Arif Mardin, Simon Climie, John Parr and Phil Ramone.

Three singles were released from the album; "Night Moves", "Move Closer" and "Body and the Beat". "Night Moves" reached No. 28 on the Billboard Hot 100, while "Move Closer" reached No. 34 on the Billboard Adult Contemporary chart. The Japanese CD release of the album featured the additional track "Thank You" and Martin's 1985 duet with Phil Collins, "Separate Lives".

== Critical reception ==
Professional ratings
Review scores
Source	Rating
AllMusic	4.5/5 stars
Sounds	2/5 stars

Upon its release, Cash Box listed the album as one of their "feature picks" during February 1986. They commented: "Her strong voice and solid song selection should propel this record." Billboard wrote: "Outstanding rock vocalist gets the royal treatment from a bevy of producers. Despite lacking any clear-cut choices for singles, the album boasts several strong cuts, most notably "One Step Closer" and "Night Moves"." In a retrospective review, Alex Henderson of AllMusic described the album as a "strong debut" and a "solid pop/rock outing", showing "considerable promise" and a "very slick, glossy, high-tech" production.

== Track listing ==
No.	Title	Writer(s)	Length
1.	"Body and the Beat"	Robert Taylor, Marc Hunter	4:04
2.	"Night Moves"	Marilyn Martin, John Parr, Jon Astley	5:18
3.	"Too Much Too Soon"	Henry Gaffney, Madeline Stone	4:35
4.	"Turn It On"	Holly Knight, Mike Chapman	4:28
5.	"The Dream Is Always the Same"	Martin, Simon Climie	4:31
6.	"One Step Closer"	Carl Sturken, Evan Rogers, David Grant, Jeff Pescetto	4:28
7.	"Beauty or the Beast"	Martin, Parr	4:28
8.	"Move Closer"	Phyllis Nelson	4:15
9.	"Wildest Dreams"	Martin, Daryl Stuermer	4:31
10.	"Here Is the News"	Charlie Dore, Julian Littman	3:54
Total length:			44:32

Japanese CD edition
No.	Title	Writer(s)	Length
1.	"Body and the Beat"		4:04
2.	"Night Moves"		5:18
3.	"Too Much Too Soon"		4:35
4.	"Turn It On"		4:28
5.	"Thank You"	Dave A. Stewart, Feargal Sharkey	4:31
6.	"One Step Closer"		4:28
7.	"Beauty or the Beast"		4:28
8.	"Move Closer"		4:15
9.	"The Dream Is Always the Same"		4:31
10.	"Here Is the News"		3:54
11.	"Wildest Dreams"		4:31
12.	"Separate Lives" (with Phil Collins)	Stephen Bishop	4:09

== Personnel ==
- Marilyn Martin – vocals

Production

- Jon Astley, Phil Chapman – producers (tracks 1–3, 9)
- Arif Mardin – producer (track 4, "Thank You" and "Separate Lives")
- Simon Climie – producer (track 5)
- Gary Stevenson – producer (track 6)
- John Parr – producer (track 7)
- Phil Ramone – producer (tracks 8, 10)
- Phil Collins, Hugh Padgham – producers of "Separate Lives"
- George Marino – mastering
- Brian Aris – photography

== Chart performance ==
Chart (1986)	Peak position
Canadian RPM Top Albums	67
Dutch Albums Chart	64
U.S. Billboard 200	73
