= Rufus (band) =

American funk band

- Also known as: Smoke; Ask Rufus; Rufus featuring Chaka Khan; Rufus & Chaka Khan; Rufus & Chaka; Rufus with Chaka Khan
- Origin: Chicago, Illinois, United States
- Genres: Funk; soul; disco
- Years active: 1970–1983, 2008–present
- Labels: Epic, ABC, MCA, Warner Bros.
- Past members: See list of members

Rufus was an American funk band from Chicago best known for launching the career of lead singer Chaka Khan. They had several hits during their career, including "Tell Me Something Good", "Sweet Thing", "Do You Love What You Feel", and "Ain't Nobody". Rufus and Chaka Khan were one of the most popular and influential funk bands of the 1970s; they had four consecutive number-one R&B albums, ten top 40 pop hits, and five number-one R&B singles among other accolades.

== Biography ==
=== Origins ===
In 1968, the American Breed (Gary Loizzo, guitar/vocals; Al Ciner, guitar; Charles "Chuck" Colbert, bass; and Lee Graziano, drums) had a top ten hit with the classic-rock single "Bend Me, Shape Me". After their success, Colbert and Graziano (without Loizzo, who pursued a successful production career) created a new group adding later-day American Breed members Kevin Murphy (keyboards) and Paulette McWilliams (vocals) as well as James Stella (vocals), and Vern Pilder (guitar) from the bar band Circus. They re-emerged in 1969 with the name Smoke. In 1970, after switching their management to Bob Monaco and Bill Traut, the group's name was changed again to Ask Rufus, taken from the title of the advice column in Mechanix Illustrated. At that point, Ciner came back replacing Pilder and Willie Weeks was added on bass after Colbert left. In 1971, the band signed a contract with Epic Records and recorded an album which was not released; then Epic dropped their contract in early 1972. Weeks was replaced by Dennis Belfield, James Stella by keyboardist/vocalist Ron Stockert, and Lee Graziano by Andre Fischer.

Paulette McWilliams and Chaka Khan had met and they became the best of friends through their spouses Howard Towles and Hassan Khan. Khan attended most Ask Rufus gigs when they performed in Chicago. When McWilliams decided that she was leaving Ask Rufus, she told them she had the perfect singer to replace her; she also asked Khan if she was interested. After the band hesitantly agreed, McWilliams remained for a few weeks to teach Khan the material. McWilliams got Khan a gig with the group Lyfe, formed by Chicago's Cash McCall. Khan had been performing at the Pumpkin Room on the south side of Chicago, with a local group, Lock and Chain which was led by drummer Scotty Harris.

=== Early career ===
Bob Monaco was part of a booking company known as Ashley Famous with Jim Golden. They booked Ask Rufus, with Paulette McWilliams and also the Rotary Connection with Minnie Riperton. Monaco was responsible for helping get Ask Rufus their deal on ABC Dunhill. Monaco returned to Los Angeles, convinced the label to give him a demo budget and then quickly returned to Chicago where the group recorded eleven songs in two days at Marty Feldman's Paragon Studios. After they took the demo tapes to ABC Dunhill in 1973, the group was immediately asked to sign a long-term recording contract.

A few weeks before Monaco saw Rufus perform, the group had already caught the attention of musician Ike Turner who flew them to Los Angeles to record at his studio Bolic Sound in Inglewood, California. Turner wanted Khan to become an Ikette; she declined saying that she was "really happy with Rufus. But Ike's attention was certainly a boost." The group returned to Los Angeles shortly after that to record Rufus at Quantum Recording Studios in Torrance, California; it was released in 1973. Although the songs "Whoever's Thrilling You (Is Killing Me)" and "Feel Good" (both featuring Khan) brought the group some attention from R&B radio stations, the album itself had minimal sales and the Stockert-led "Slip & Slide" failed to catch major attention from pop radio. The group quickly re-entered the same studio to record their follow-up album Rags to Rufus.

Ciner and Belfield left the group shortly thereafter along with Stockert who was replaced by keyboardist Nate Morgan, based in Los Angeles. Additionally, Tony Maiden and bassist Bobby Watson, who was also from Los Angeles, were recruited by drummer Andre Fischer. The trio's addition to Rufus added a unique sound to the group, bringing a stronger funk and jazz influence to complement Khan's now emerging powerful lead vocals.

=== Success, stardom and tension ===
Rags to Rufus was released in 1974 and two of its singles—the Stevie Wonder-penned "Tell Me Something Good" and the Parker-Khan composition, "You Got the Love"—became smash hits and Rags to Rufus went Platinum. They landed opening spots for the tours of several top stars, including Stevie Wonder, Cheech and Chong, and the Hues Corporation. "Tell Me Something Good" also gave Rufus their first Grammy Award. In addition it sold over one million copies and was awarded a Gold disc by the RIAA on August 9, 1974.

Due to Khan's increasing popularity Rufus and ABC began calling the group Rufus featuring Chaka Khan. With the new billing, the band recorded and released their next album without delay, Rufusized in 1974. Another Platinum success, the group again entered the top ten with the funk singles, "Once You Get Started" (penned by Gavin Christopher), "Stop on By", "I'm a Woman", "Pack'd My Bags" (later sampled for Jody Watley's "Lovin' You So"), and "Please Pardon Me (You Remind Me of a Friend)", penned by their friend Brenda Russell.

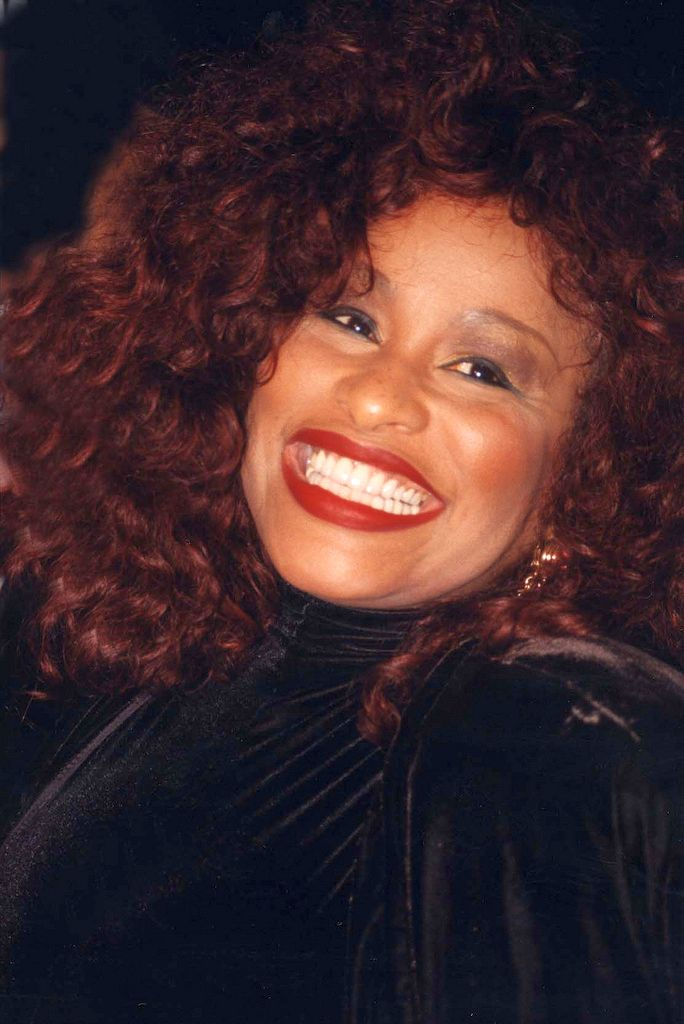
Chaka Khan in 1996

The group headlined their first major tour in 1975, with Khan attracting attention in concert reviews for her powerhouse vocals and sexy attire—so much so that Khan was often featured on magazine covers like Jet. Due to her off-stage antics which added to her on-stage persona, the media billed Khan as "the wild child". She was often compared to Tina Turner and some rock and soul press labeled her a "pint-sized Tina". Attention to Khan began to make waves for some of the group's members, as they felt her presence overshadowed the band itself.

The group's fourth release, and the third major release with Khan as singer, Rufus Featuring Chaka Khan, was released in 1975. The major hit on the album was a composition by Khan and Tony Maiden titled "Sweet Thing"; it reached the top five of the charts and became their fourth record to go Gold. Despite the album's success as well as a second successful major tour which followed, tensions grew within the group, particularly between Khan and longtime Rufus drummer Andre Fischer.

Khan married Richard Holland during recording sessions of Ask Rufus. She had divorced her first husband Hassan Khan in 1974 prior to the birth of their child Milini. Holland's presence only made things worse between Khan and Fischer. During one session of Ask Rufus, Fischer got into a fight with Holland, who received help from Khan who counter-attacked. Ask Rufus was released in 1977 and includes the hits "At Midnight (My Love Will Lift You Up)", "Hollywood", and "Everlasting Love". After a tour promoting Ask Rufus, Fischer finally left the group. He was followed by Nate Morgan. They were replaced by Richard "Moon" Calhoun and David "Hawk" Wolinski, respectively.

The new line-up recorded the album Street Player, featuring the Khan-composed song "Stay". After first putting it off as a rumor, Khan confirmed to media reports that she was going solo and signing a deal with Warner Bros. Records. The decision strained relations between Khan and the other Rufus members. Khan released her self-titled debut later in 1978. The album sold more than Street Player, going Platinum, thanks to the international Ashford & Simpson-composed single "I'm Every Woman". She continued to promote the album in 1979. In April 1978, Calhoun was replaced by John "JR" Robinson as the group's drummer.

=== Decline and final years ===
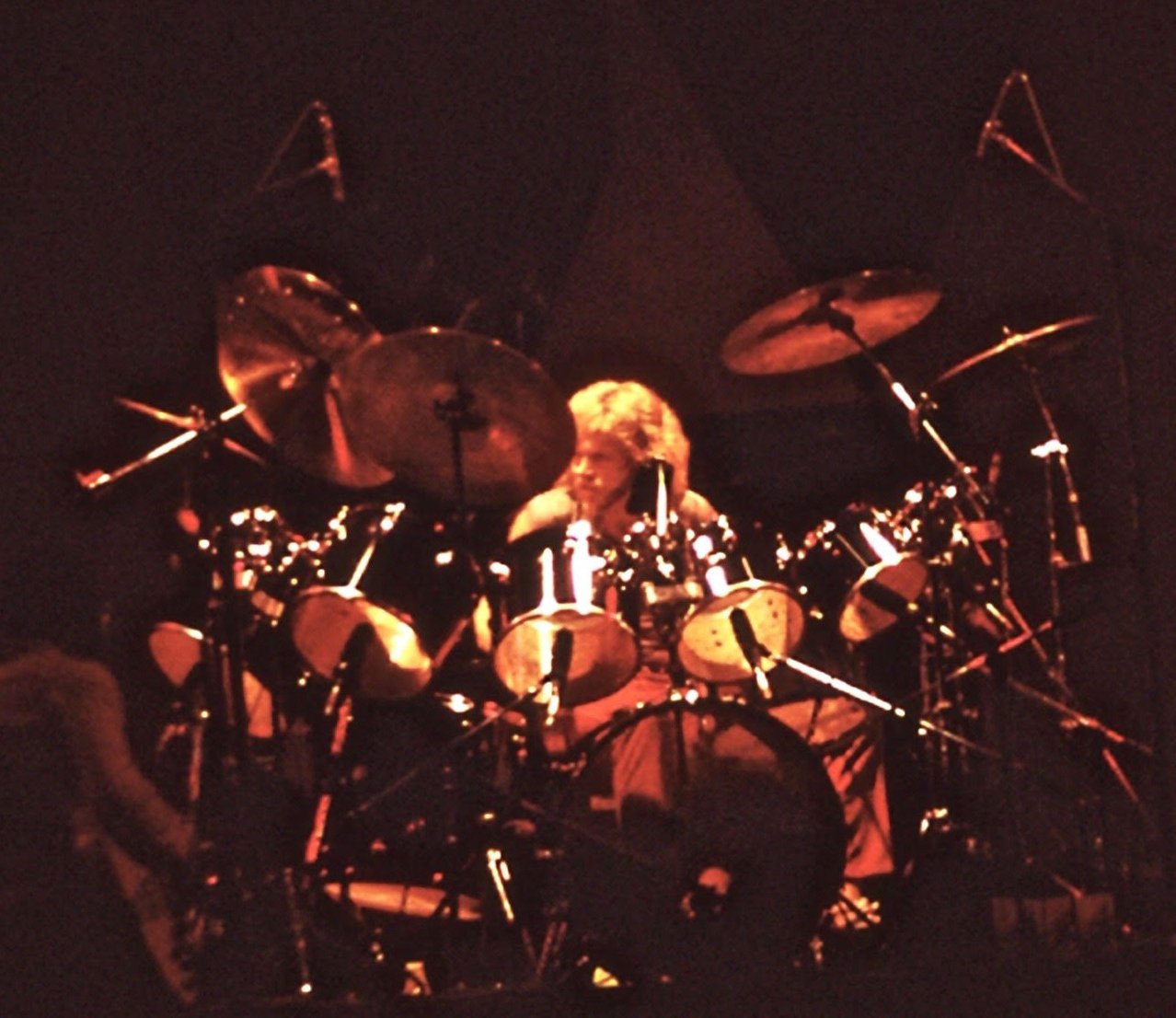
Drummer JR Robinson preparing for a Rufus concert in 1980

After Calhoun's replacement, ABC Records was absorbed by MCA, bringing the group to MCA. While Khan promoted Chaka, Rufus put out a less favorably received album without Khan, Numbers. Khan returned to record with the band for Masterjam which was produced by Quincy Jones. By now, Rufus and Khan were two separate acts. Khan's stardom helped Masterjam go Gold thanks to the funk-laden disco recording, "Do You Love What You Feel". Though Khan said later that she was ready to leave Rufus at the time she released Chaka in 1978, she discovered that she had two more albums left in her ABC/MCA contract with the band and agreed to fulfill her obligations. After Masterjam, one of the contractual albums, and another album without Khan, Party 'Til You're Broke, which did not sell well, Rufus and Khan reunited for their last MCA album, Camouflage, in 1981. Tension was felt during the album sessions. Khan avoided the band, recording her vocals alone to a click track.

The album failed to garner attention, mainly due to Khan's solo obligations, which now included two more Gold-certified studio albums, Naughty and What Cha' Gonna Do for Me. With the release of Camouflage, Khan was free to leave the group and after her exit in early 1982, the remaining members of Rufus released what became their final studio album, Seal in Red in 1983. Like their previous albums, it went unnoticed. Rufus band members agreed to split after one last live album. The band asked Khan to contribute to their final concert performance, which was filmed by Warner Bros. She obliged, reuniting with the group for what was later released as a documentary film, Stompin' At the Savoy. Warner Bros. declined to release the film at that time and released only the live album. The filmed concert has since been released to home video.

The album included four Khan-led studio songs, including the Dave Wolinski composition "Ain't Nobody", which got attention when a producer for the film Breakin' heard it while screening songs for the movie's soundtrack. WB eventually released the song (with the billing Rufus and Chaka Khan) and the song became a top 30 Billboard Hot 100 hit, reaching number one on the R&B chart and was number eight on the UK Singles Chart. The success of the track led to the band receiving its second Grammy Award for Best R&B Performance by a Duo or Group with Vocals.

After that Rufus went their separate ways. Khan soon released the album and smash single "I Feel for You", cementing her solo career, which continued successfully for decades.

=== Post-breakup ===
In 2001, Rufus (Kevin Murphy, Tony Maiden, Bobby Watson, Dave Wolinski, John "JR" Robinson) and Khan reunited for a brief tour, which Khan described in her 2003 autobiography, Chaka! Through the Fire (co-written with Tonya Bolden). Khan and Maiden reunited on the modernized Rufus medley "Pack'd My Bags"/ "You Got the Love", on Khan's double Grammy Award-winning 2007 album, Funk This. While discussing a second potential reunion with Rufus during a 2008 interview with Billboard, Khan said that the band's classic lineup, which includes Andre Fischer and Nate Morgan, had no plans on reuniting with Khan saying that touring with Maiden, one of the few Rufus bandmates with which Khan kept a close friendship was the closest to another Rufus reunion.

A lineup of Rufus including Bobby Watson and JR began a short tour in 2008. Neither founding member Kevin Murphy, mainstay Tony Maiden, nor Dave Wolinski participated in the tour. In September 2011, the Rock & Roll Hall of Fame committee announced that the band and Khan were jointly nominated for induction to the 27th annual class. They had been eligible since 1999 (with the committee counting the band's first album as being Rags to Rufus rather than 1973's Rufus). It was their first year of nomination. Earlier in the year, Khan received a solo star on the Hollywood Walk of Fame. Rufus was nominated again for the Rock & Roll Hall of Fame in September 2017.

== Members ==
=== Final lineup ===
- Kevin Murphy – keyboards (1970–1983)
- Chaka Khan – vocals (1972–1983)
- Tony Maiden – guitar, vocals (1974–1983)
- Bobby Watson – bass (1974–1983)
- Dave "Hawk" Wolinski – keyboards, vocals (1977–1983)
- John "JR" Robinson – drums (1979–1983)
- Ivan Neville – vocals (1983) (Note: Only on 1983 album Seal in Red.)

=== Former members ===
- Lee Graziano – drums (1970–1972)
- Chuck Colbert Jr. – bass (1970)
- Al Ciner – guitar (1970–1974)
- Paulette McWilliams – vocals (1970–1972)
- James Stella – vocals (1970–1972)
- Willie Weeks – bass (1970–1972)
- Andre Fischer – drums (1972–1977)
- Ron Stockert – keyboards, vocals (1972–1974)
- Dennis Belfield – bass (1972–1974)
- Nate Morgan – keyboards (1974–1977, died 2013)
- Richard "Moon" Calhoun – drums (1977–1979)

Timeline

== Discography ==
=== Studio albums ===
Year	Album	Peak chart positions					Certifications	Record label
Year	Album	US Pop	US R&B	AUS	CAN	UK	Certifications	Record label
1973	Rufus	175	44	—	—	—		ABC
1974	Rags to Rufus	4	4	—	23	—	RIAA: Gold	ABC
1974	Rufusized	7	2	—	51	48	RIAA: Gold	ABC
1975	Rufus featuring Chaka Khan	7	1	86	73	—	RIAA: Gold	ABC
1977	Ask Rufus	12	1	—	—	—	RIAA: Platinum	ABC
1978	Street Player	14	1	—	13	—	RIAA: Gold	ABC
1979	Numbers	81	15	—	—	—		ABC
1979	Masterjam	14	1	—	—	—	RIAA: Gold	MCA
1981	Party 'Til You're Broke	73	24	—	—	—		MCA
1981	Camouflage	98	15	—	—	—		MCA
1983	Seal in Red	—	49	—	—	—		Warner Bros.
"—" denotes a recording that did not chart or was not released in that territory.

=== Live albums ===
Year	Album	Peak chart positions			Record label
Year	Album	US	US R&B	UK	Record label
1983	Stompin' at the Savoy – Live	50	4	64	Warner Bros.

=== Compilation albums ===
- The Very Best of Rufus with Chaka Khan (1982, MCA)
- Chaka Khan and Rufus - Maybe Your Baby (2008, Cugate Ltd.)

=== Singles ===
Year	Single	Peak chart positions						Certifications	Album
Year	Single	US Pop	US R&B	US Dan	AUS	CAN	UK	Certifications	Album
1970	"Brand New Day"	—	—	—	—	—	—		—N/a
1971	"Fire One, Fire Two, Fire Three"	—	—	—	—	—	—		—N/a
1973	"Slip 'n Slide"	110	—	—	—	—	—		Rufus
1973	"Whoever's Thrilling You (Is Killing Me)"	—	40	—	—	—	—		Rufus
1973	"Feel Good"	—	45	—	—	—	—		Rufus
1974	"Tell Me Something Good"	3	3	—	64	21	54 (Note: Chart position is from the official UK "Breakers List".)	RIAA: Gold	Rags to Rufus
1974	"You Got the Love"	11	1	—	—	21	—		Rags to Rufus
1975	"Once You Get Started"	10	4	6	—	14	59		Rufusized
1975	"Stop on By"	—	—	—	—	—	57		Rufusized
1975	"Please Pardon Me (You Remind Me of a Friend)"	48	6	—	—	75	—		Rufusized
1975	"Sweet Thing"	5	1	—	—	68	—	RIAA: Gold	Rufus featuring Chaka Khan
1976	"Dance Wit Me"	39	5	—	—	75	—		Rufus featuring Chaka Khan
1976	"Jive Talkin'"	—	35	—	—	—	—		Rufus featuring Chaka Khan
1977	"At Midnight (My Love Will Lift You Up)"	30	1	37	—	57	—		Ask Rufus
1977	"Hollywood"	32	3	—	—	56	—		Ask Rufus
1977	"Everlasting Love"	—	17	—	—	—	—		Ask Rufus
1978	"Stay"	38	3	—	—	44	—		Street Player
1978	"Blue Love"	105	34	—	—	—	—		Street Player
1979	"Keep It Together (Declaration of Love)"	109	16	—	—	—	—		Numbers
1979	"Ain't Nobody Like You"	—	—	—	—	—	—		Numbers
1979	"Do You Love What You Feel"	30	1	5	—	—	—		Masterjam
1980	"Any Love"	102	24	5	—	—	—		Masterjam
1980	"I'm Dancing for Your Love"	—	43	—	—	—	—		Masterjam
1981	"Tonight We Love"	—	18	64	—	—	—		Party 'Til You're Broke
1981	"Hold on to a Friend"	—	56	—	—	—	—		Party 'Til You're Broke
1981	"Sharing the Love"	91	8	—	—	—	—		Camouflage
1982	"Better Together"	—	66	56	—	—	—		Camouflage
1983	"Take It to the Top"	—	47	—	—	—	—		Seal in Red
1983	"Ain't Nobody"	22	1	6	—	—	8	RIAA: Platinum; BPI: 2× Platinum; MC: Gold; ARIA: Platinum; RMNZ: Platinum	Stompin' at the Savoy – Live
1984	"One Million Kisses"	102	37	67	—	—	86		Stompin' at the Savoy – Live
1989	"Ain't Nobody" (7" Remix Edit)	—	—	1	—	—	6		Life Is a Dance: The Remix Project
"—" denotes a recording that did not chart or was not released in that territory.

== Accolades ==
=== Grammy Awards ===
Rufus has won two Grammy Awards, from three Grammy nominations.

Year	Nominated work	Award category	Result
1974	"Tell Me Something Good"	Best R&B Vocal Performance by a Duo, Group Or Chorus	Won
1977	Ask Rufus	Best R&B Vocal Performance by a Duo, Group Or Chorus	Nominated
1983	"Ain't Nobody"	Grammy Award for Best R&B Performance by a Duo or Group with Vocal	Won

== Covers ==
Rufus covered songs including Quincy Jones' "Body Heat". "Ain't Nobody" was covered by many artists, including Kelly Price, Faith Evans, Diana King, and George Michael. 1983's "You're Really Out of Line" was recorded by Belgian band Awaken in 2001.
