= Robbie Nevil =

American pop singer, songwriter, record producer and guitarist

- Born: Robert S. Nevil; October 2, 1958 (age 67); Los Angeles, California, U.S.
- Genres: Pop, R&B, funk, dance
- Occupations: Singer, songwriter
- Instruments: Vocals, guitar, keyboards
- Years active: As performer: 1986–1996; As songwriter/producer: 1983–present
- Label: Manhattan Records
- Website: Official website

Robert S. Nevil (born October 2, 1958) is an American pop singer, songwriter, record producer, and guitarist who had five Billboard top 40 hits including his songs "C'est la Vie" (#2, 1986), "Dominoes" (#14, 1987), and "Wot's It to Ya" (#10, 1987).

== Life and career ==
Nevil began playing guitar at age 11 and played in a series of cover bands. He began performing his original music and signed a publishing deal in 1983, writing songs for the Pointer Sisters; El DeBarge; Alison Moyet; and Earth, Wind & Fire.

In 1986, he obtained his first recording contract, signing with Manhattan Records, and he recorded his debut album with the producers Alex Sadkin and Phil Thornalley. His debut single "C'est la Vie" reached #2 on the Billboard Hot 100, propelling the album into the top 40 on both the U.S. pop and Billboard R&B chart. His second single "Dominoes" hit #14 on the Hot 100 and #22 on the Hot Dance Music/Club Play chart, while the third single "Wot's It to Ya" peaked at #10 on the Hot 100 and Dance Club/Play charts, and #69 on the R&B chart. He sang backup on Stevie Nicks' version of "Silent Night" for the holiday compilation A Very Special Christmas.

Nevil's second album was released in 1988; however, it did not match the success of his debut album. A Place Like This (#118) spawned the top 40 moderate hit "Back on Holiday" (#34), and a second single, "Somebody Like You", became a minor hit, peaking at #63. During this period, Nevil was also in discussions regarding becoming the lead singer of Yes following the departure of Jon Anderson.

In 1991, Nevil's album Day 1 was released to fewer sales. The lead single "Just Like You" became his biggest hit since his debut album, and his fifth and final top 40 single, peaking at #25 on the Hot 100. His single "For Your Mind" peaked at #86, ending his chart run in the U.S.

Nevil turned to writing and producing for other acts such as Babyface, Jessica Simpson, Destiny's Child, and Japanese pop singer Seiko Matsuda. In 2006, he collaborated with Matthew Gerrard on the Smash Mouth album Summer Girl. Gerrard had been writing for Disney for some time and their work led to a partnership working on Disney projects, including The Cheetah Girls, High School Musical, and Hannah Montana. Nevil shared ASCAP Awards for his work on High School Musical and Hannah Montana in 2008, 2009, and 2010.

From 2011 on, Nevil has been creating, writing, and producing music for Extreme Music, part of Sony/ATV Music Publishing. Several of his Extreme Music compositions appear on the 2015 Sony compilation album Party Pop.

Nevil is married with two children and divides his time between Southern California and Colorado. He is the older brother of actor Alex Nevil.

== Discography ==
=== Studio albums ===
Year	Album	Peak chart positions						
Year	Album	US	US R&B	AUS	AUT	NOR	SWE	UK
1986	Robbie Nevil (Note: Released in the UK as C'est la Vie.)	37	32	—	19	9	6	93
1988	A Place Like This	118	—	—	—	—	30	—
1991	Day 1	—	—	89	—	—	—	—
"—" denotes releases that did not chart or were not released.

=== Compilation albums ===
- The Best of Robbie Nevil (1998)
- Wot's It to Ya: The Best of Robbie Nevil (1999)
- Party Pop (2015)

=== Singles ===
Year	Song	Peak chart positions										Certifications	Album
Year	Song	US	US Dance	US R&B	AUS	AUT	CAN	NOR	NZ	SWE	UK	Certifications	Album
1986	"C'est la Vie"	2	1	7	4	4	1	4	2	2	3	MC: Gold	Robbie Nevil
1987	"Dominoes"	14	22	―	38	―	26	―	38	—	26		Robbie Nevil
1987	"Wot's It to Ya"	10	10	69	—	―	24	―	37	―	43		Robbie Nevil
1988	"Back on Holiday"	34	―	52	―	―	33	―	―	―	―		A Place Like This
1989	"Somebody Like You"	63	―	―	176	―	―	―	―	―	―		A Place Like This
1989	"Getting Better"	―	―	―	―	―	―	―	―	―	—		A Place Like This
1991	"Just Like You"	25	―	―	4	―	30	―	―	―	―	ARIA: Gold	Day 1
1991	"For Your Mind"	86	―	93	―	―	―	―	―	―	―		Day 1
1992	"Partners in Crime"	―	―	—	62	―	―	―	―	―	―		Day 1
1996	"I'll Be There for You" (duet with Seiko Matsuda)	―	―	―	―	―	―	―	―	―	—		—N/a
"—" denotes releases that did not chart or were not released in that territory.

== See also ==
- List of artists who reached number one on the U.S. Dance Club Songs chart
- List of Billboard number-one dance club songs
