= Al Ciner =

American guitarist (born 1947)

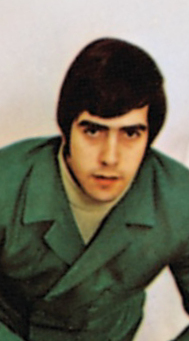
- Ciner in 1968

Background information
- Born: May 14, 1947 (age 78); Chicago, Illinois, U.S.
- Genres: Rock; pop
- Occupation: Musician
- Instruments: Guitar; vocals
- Years active: 1960s–present
- Formerly of: The American Breed; Rufus; Three Dog Night

Alan Ciner (born May 14, 1947) is an American guitarist best known for playing guitar for The American Breed from 1966 to 1970.

== Career ==
He was the guitarist for Gary & the Knight Lites, who changed their name to The American Breed. The American Breed are best known for their 1967 song Bend Me, Shape Me. He co-founded Rufus, playing on one of the band's best-known hits, "Tell Me Something Good". He was with them from 1970-74 then later replaced James "Smitty" Smith (who had in turn replaced Michael Allsup) in Three Dog Night in 1975; and remained with them until they initially disbanded in 1976.

In the late 1970s, he played on three songs, "Trying to Get to You", "Give Me One More Chance" and "I’m Carrying" which eventually surfaced on the From the Heart & Soul album by Dianne Brooks which was released by the Panda Digital label in 2021.
