= Kevin Murphy (musician) =

American keyboardist (born 1947)

Kevin Murphy (born 1947, Saint Paul, Minnesota) is an American keyboardist. He has played with The American Breed. He and fellow American Breed member Al Ciner are founding members of the band Rufus.
