= New Girl season 4 =

New Girl
- Season 4
- DVD cover art
- Starring: Zooey Deschanel; Jake Johnson; Max Greenfield; Lamorne Morris; Hannah Simone; Damon Wayans Jr.
- No. of episodes: 22

Release
- Original network: Fox
- Original release: September 16, 2014 – May 5, 2015

Season chronology
- ← Previous; Season 3 Next → Season 5

The fourth season of the American television sitcom New Girl aired on Fox from September 16, 2014, to May 5, 2015, and consisted of 22 episodes. Created by Elizabeth Meriwether, the series stars Zooey Deschanel as Jessica "Jess" Day, alongside Jake Johnson, Max Greenfield, Lamorne Morris, Hannah Simone, and Damon Wayans Jr.

The season follows Jess and Nick as they adjust to being friends following their breakup. Other storylines include Jess's relationship with fellow teacher Ryan Geauxinue, Winston's training and subsequent career as a police officer, and Coach's developing relationship with musician May. Schmidt and Cece also reconsider their feelings for one another, culminating in their engagement in the season finale, "Clean Break".

== Production ==
In developing the fourth season, series creator and executive producer Elizabeth Meriwether sought to explore the characters' lives following Nick and Jess's breakup during the previous season. Speaking at the Television Critics Association press tour in July 2014, Meriwether explained that writing the characters as single people created more opportunities for comedy. She later described the fourth season as an effort to re-establish the programme as an ensemble comedy without making Nick and Jess's romantic relationship the centre of every storyline.

The series introduced a revised opening title sequence in November 2014, replacing the original sequence centred on Jess with a shorter version featuring photographs of the main cast. The change incorporated Hannah Simone and Damon Wayans Jr. into the opening credits alongside the other regular cast members. Meriwether confirmed that the revised titles had been designed to include both actors.

In February 2015, it was announced that Wayans would leave the regular cast at the conclusion of the fourth season. He had returned to the series during its third season after previously appearing in the pilot episode. Meriwether subsequently explained that the production team had learned of his departure midway through the fourth season and began developing Coach's exit storyline around the fifteenth episode, when his relationship with May was introduced.

Meriwether also revealed that the writers had planned Schmidt and Cece's engagement as the fourth-season finale's principal development from the beginning of the season. On March 31, 2015, Fox renewed New Girl for a fifth season. Filming for that season began before the fourth season had finished broadcasting, allowing the production to complete episodes ahead of Deschanel's maternity leave.

== Cast and characters ==
=== Main cast ===
- Zooey Deschanel as Jessica "Jess" Day
- Jake Johnson as Nick Miller
- Max Greenfield as Schmidt
- Lamorne Morris as Winston Bishop
- Hannah Simone as Cece
- Damon Wayans, Jr. as Coach

=== Recurring cast ===
- Rob Reiner as Bob Day
- Curtis Armstrong as Principal Foster
- Angela Kinsey as Rose
- Steve Agee as Outside Dave
- Brian Posehn as Biology Teacher
- Jamie Lee Curtis as Joan
- Julian Morris as Ryan Geauxinue
- Greta Lee as Kai
- Zoe Lister-Jones as Fawn Moscato
- Meaghan Rath as May
- Nasim Pedrad as Aly Nelson
- Michaela Watkins as Gina
- Erinn Hayes as Ruth

=== Guest cast ===
- Ben Falcone as Mike
- Jessica Biel as Kat
- Reid Scott as Ted
- Kaitlin Olson as Ashley Berkman
- Kurt Braunohler as Roy
- Jimmy O. Yang as Steve
- Alan Ritchson as Matt
- Cleo King as Sergeant Dorado
- Michael Stahl-David as Ian
- Alexandra Daddario as Michelle
- Amber Stevens as Viv
- Wayne Federman as Ned
- Rebecca Reid as Nadia
- Lisa Bonet as Brenda Brown
- Alison Becker as Pearl
- Billy Eichner as Barry
- Dennis Haskins as Santa
- Barry Bostwick as Robert
- Sarah Burns as Deb
- Lori Greiner as herself
- Craig Anton as Professor Dust
- Justin Long as Paul
- Josh Gad as Bearclaw
- J. J. Watt as himself
- Fiona Gubelmann as Val
- Nora Dunn as Louise
- Kiersey Clemons as KC
- Artemis Pebdani as Martha Yowtz
- Holly Sonders as herself
- Regis Philbin as himself

== Episodes ==
No. overall	No. in season	Title	Directed by	Written by	Original release date	Prod. code	U.S. viewers (millions)
73	1	"The Last Wedding"	Trent O'Donnell	J. J. Philbin	September 16, 2014	4ATM01	3.04
With the gang attending yet another wedding this summer, Schmidt motivates everyone to get back in the sexual game. Jess competes with Kat (Jessica Biel), an overachieving scientist, for the affection of Ted (Reid Scott). Ted is the best man - and, according to Kat is the only eligible guy at the wedding. Schmidt tries to convince Nick to take part in a foursome with two of the bridesmaids - but then Schmidt decides against it. Coach has a hard time trying to hook up with women at the wedding because of his history with them, while Winston tries to function while being really physically sore from training at the police academy. Cece reveals that she and Buster have broken up.
74	2	"Dice"	Lynn Shelton	Matt Fusfeld & Alex Cuthbertson	September 23, 2014	4ATM02	2.35
With a little help from Schmidt, Jess uses a dating app called Dice to effectively find the best guy for her. Coach reveals that he never tried marijuana, so Nick and Cece bake pot brownies for Coach's first stoned experience, where they all get stoned, just as LAPD cadet Winston invites them all to a barbecue with other LAPD cadets.
75	3	"Julie Berkman's Older Sister"	Fred Goss	Nina Pedrad	September 30, 2014	4ATM03	2.37
Jess' father Bob visits with his new young girlfriend Ashley Berkman (Kaitlin Olson), a classmate from Jess' old high school and a recovering sex addict. Bob proposes to Ashley and she accepts. Schmidt rigs a product focus group with Coach, Nick and Winston participating on giving their thoughts on sponges.
76	4	"Micro"	Jay Chandrasekhar	Josh Malmuth	October 7, 2014	4ATM04	2.61
Jess tries to prove to the guys that she is not superficial by dating Matt (Alan Ritchson), a handsome guy who has a rare male endowment issue (a micropenis). She stops seeing him after his girlfriend walks in. Cece and Winston trick Coach and Schmidt into thinking that they are good looking enough to be male models.
77	5	"Landline"	Trent O'Donnell	Rob Rosell	October 14, 2014	4ATM05	2.26
Vice principal Jess implements a non-dating policy with the faculty members, just as she becomes attracted to Ryan Geauxinue (Julian Morris), the new teacher, who is taking over her old science teaching position. When Jess gets a new landline phone for the apartment, Nick becomes the "secretary" of the phone taking messages and acting in behalf of Schmidt and Winston.
78	6	"Background Check"	Lorene Scafaria	Rebecca Addelman	November 4, 2014	4ATM06	3.38
As a part of his police academy processing, Winston must undergo a background check, as well as having the apartment searched by his superior Dorado (Cleo King). However, Jess reveals to the guys that she has a bag of meth in her possession. She informs the officer doing the check, who tells Jess that the 'meth' is actually aquarium rocks.
79	7	"Goldmine"	Russ Alsobrook	Berkley Johnson	November 11, 2014	4ATM07	3.04
Nick pretends to be gay to avoid conflict with Jess' new boyfriend Ian (Michael Stahl-David). When Cece reveals that she is considering breast reduction surgery, Schmidt is emotionally distraught. Winston does handyman tasks hoping it will lead to him sleeping with either Michelle (Alexandra Daddario) or her new roommate Viv (Amber Stevens West), but Coach tries to short cut the strategy.
80	8	"Teachers"	Trent O'Donnell	Kim Rosenstock	November 18, 2014	4ATM08	2.83
Jess and Coach go to a teachers workshop during the weekend, held by Brenda Brown (Lisa Bonet), a free-spirited education guru. During the weekend, Jess is terrified to spend any intimate time with Ryan and Coach is doubtful that he will be a good enough health teacher. While Jess is away, Nick, Schmidt and Winston have a "guys weekend".
81	9	"Thanksgiving IV"	Fred Goss	David Feeney	November 25, 2014	4ATM09	2.77
For Thanksgiving, Schmidt demands that everyone bring a friend to sleep with another friend for "Bangsgiving". Coach invites Ryan for the occasion, with Jess still having conflicting feelings for him.
82	10	"Girl Fight"	Bill Purple	Danielle Sanchez-Witzel	December 2, 2014	4ATM10	3.00
An old disagreement between Jess and Cece is brought up again, causing more tense ramifications than before. Nick begins dating Tran's granddaughter Kai with Winston putting the thought into Nick's mind that she may be homeless. Winston has a hard time buckling down to study for the LAPD entrance exam.
83	11	"LAXmas"	Trent O'Donnell	Matt Fusfeld & Alex Cuthbertson	December 9, 2014	4ATM11	3.28
The gang arrives at the Los Angeles International Airport, where most of their flights are delayed. Jess is invited by Ryan to meet his family in the United Kingdom for Christmas, and is worried that she is not good enough for them when she sees his family's house, and gives up when her gifts are stolen by a perverted Santa (Dennis Haskins). Coach wants to go vacationing instead of seeing his sister and niece. Schmidt and Cece visit an airport lounge.
84	12	"Shark"	Alex Hardcastle	Jacob Brown & Rob Rosell	January 6, 2015	4ATM12	3.19
Jess and Schmidt disagree on the approach that should be taken concerning overnight construction disturbing the neighborhood. Matters get even more complicated with Schmidt falling for Fawn Moscato, a cold and manipulative councilwoman working for the neighborhood district. Winston graduates from the police academy and is assigned a partner named Aly. Nick and Coach then become worried that Aly is too small to protect Winston when they are on duty.
85	13	"Coming Out"	Bill Purple	Sophia Lear	January 13, 2015	4ATM13	2.90
Jess finally tells the school staff about her relationship with Ryan Geauxinue, however she also tries not to show favoritism to Ryan, when the teachers are tasked to come up with a school field trip. When Schmidt is diagnosed with ulcers and recommended to take a day off from work, Nick and Kai make sure that he does. Coach changes his personality to hook up with Nurse Ruth (Erinn Hayes). Winston is obsessed with wearing a crystal around his neck that he thinks is a good luck charm.
86	14	"Swuit"	Trent O'Donnell	Noah Garfinkel	February 3, 2015	4ATM14	2.96
Jess tries to mediate when Nick and Schmidt continually clash concerning business ideas that they plan on presenting to Shark Tank investor Lori Greiner. Cece is unable to pay for her college tuition, but does not want to tell Jess, so Coach and Winston offer to "invest" in her. However, the two guys then hover over Cece to pick more profitable college courses.
87	15	"The Crawl"	Jay Chandrasekhar	Kim Rosenstock	February 10, 2015	4ATM15	2.71
After Kai breaks up with him, Nick has the gang take part in a bar crawl on Valentine's Day, with Winston providing the equivalent of the designated driver. While struggling to find a new job at another school, Ryan asks Jess to move in with him. Schmidt and Fawn are now dating, but she is more concerned with impressing her fellow colleagues, leaving Schmidt to emotionally reconnect with Cece. Coach meets a woman named May but is rejected for his cheesy pick-up antics, but he keeps running into her at the next bar crawl destinations.
88	16	"Oregon"	Russ Alsobrook	Nina Pedrad	February 17, 2015	4ATM16	3.08
The gang travels to Jess's old hometown of Portland for Bob's wedding to Ashley. When Ryan fails to show up for the trip to Portland, Jess begins to feel that continuing her long distance relationship with him was a mistake. The gang support Jess by going on her hometown tour of the places she frequented. Cece gets flustered trying to talk to an old high school crush. Nick and Coach return to Jess's mother's house to retrieve the wedding rings, only to find Joan on a "trip" with her friends.
89	17	"Spiderhunt"	Steve Welch	Berkley Johnson	February 24, 2015	4ATM17	2.85
Schmidt's arachnophobia causes the gang to hunt for a spider loose in the loft. Cece is reluctant to tell Jess about her feelings for Schmidt. Nick cooks his infamous sauce. Coach has a hard time typing an e-mail to send to May, asking her out on a date.
90	18	"Walk of Shame"	Christine Gernon	Danielle Sanchez-Witzel	March 3, 2015	4ATM18	2.53
Jess and Cece end up taking the walk of shame, in Jess's case she spends the night with Bearclaw (Josh Gad). Coach is embarrassed to invite Nick and Winston to an art exhibit where May, who is a cellist, will be performing.
91	19	"The Right Thing"	Erin O'Malley	Matt Fusfeld & Alex Cuthbertson	March 31, 2015	4ATM19	2.32
Jess feels obligated to attend the memorial of Pete, a guy she only dated twice, only to find out later that the memorial is being conducted by Pete's girlfriend Val (Fiona Gubelmann). Pete was also a sports agent, with one of his clients being J. J. Watt, who Coach becomes starstruck over. Nick and Schmidt want to become part owners of Mike's (Ben Falcone) bar, but in order to come up with the money, Schmidt asks his mother Louise (Nora Dunn) for his long-awaited Bar Mitzvah money. Winston wants to hang out socially with Aly, however she is not interested.
92	20	"Par 5"	Trent O'Donnell	Lamorne Morris & Rob Rosell	April 7, 2015	4ATM20	2.14
Jess accompanies Fawn Moscato to a female charity golf tournament, so Jess can network with politicians to get new computers for her school. Winston falls for KC (Kiersey Clemons), an activist who is not too fond of the police, so Winston hides the fact that he is a police officer. With Cece's help, Schmidt put on bronzer, to not look too pale when he is out with Fawn.
93	21	"Panty Gate"	Reginald Hudlin	David Feeney & Veronica McCarthy	April 28, 2015	4ATM21	2.07
Coach and May decide to break up after May gets a job offer in New York, but the decision affects them both emotionally, with Jess trying to fix things between them. Schmidt agrees to be by Fawn Moscato's side after an embarrassing mishap. A book inspires Cece to take chances.
94	22	"Clean Break"	Trent O'Donnell	Story by : Rebecca Addelman; Teleplay by : Rebecca Addelman & Kim Rosenstock	May 5, 2015	4ATM22	2.22
Coach prepares to move to New York to live with May and refuses to hold on to any mementos of his time living in the loft. Jess and Nick re-evaluate their friendship. Schmidt finally gets rid of his mementos of Cece, although he soon regrets his decision. Schmidt finally admits his feelings to Cece and proposes to her.

== Reception ==
=== Critical response ===
The fourth season of New Girl received positive reviews from television critics, with particular praise directed towards the ensemble cast and the series' renewed emphasis on character-driven comedy. On Rotten Tomatoes, the season holds an approval rating of 100% based on 11 critic reviews. The website's critical consensus highlights the improved chemistry between the principal characters, comparing it favourably with the second season.

Reviewing the opening episodes for Variety, Brian Lowry suggested that the series was showing signs of improvement following its third season. Although he acknowledged that the programme had "lost a bit of its fastball", he considered the new episodes more promising for viewers who had enjoyed its earlier seasons.

In December 2014, The A.V. Club placed New Girl at number 34 on its list of the year's best television programmes. Critic Sean O'Neal praised the decision to move away from the central Nick–Jess romance, arguing that it allowed the supporting characters, particularly Winston and Coach, to receive greater attention. The publication also identified "The Last Wedding", "Background Check", and "Thanksgiving IV" as notable episodes.

Reviewing the season finale in May 2015, Erik Adams of The A.V. Club described the fourth season as the programme's strongest to that point, praising its ensemble performances and the development of relationships between the characters.

Justin Remer of DVD Talk offered a more qualified assessment, suggesting that the season occasionally struggled to provide equally engaging storylines for its large cast. Nevertheless, he praised the performers' chemistry and considered the series capable of delivering effective ensemble comedy.

=== Ratings ===
In the United States, the fourth season averaged approximately 2.72 million viewers per episode in its original broadcasts, with an average rating of 1.31 among adults aged 18–49. This represented a decline from the third season, which averaged 4.31 million viewers and a rating of 2.1 in the same demographic. These figures represent national same-day ratings rather than viewership totals incorporating delayed viewing.

== Home media release ==
New Girl: The Complete Fourth Season was released on DVD in the United States on September 1, 2015, by 20th Century Fox Home Entertainment. Unlike the first three seasons, the fourth was issued as a manufacture-on-demand release rather than a conventional retail DVD edition. The three-disc collection contains all 22 episodes of the season.
