= New Girl season 5 =

New Girl
- Season 5
- DVD cover art
- Starring: Zooey Deschanel; Jake Johnson; Max Greenfield; Lamorne Morris; Hannah Simone
- No. of episodes: 22

Release
- Original network: Fox
- Original release: January 5 – May 10, 2016

Season chronology
- ← Previous; Season 4 Next → Season 6

The fifth season of the American television sitcom New Girl premiered on January 5, 2016, on Fox in its new timeslot of 8:00 pm (Eastern). The show briefly aired back-to-back on April 19 before airing the final six episodes, beginning April 26, at 8:00 and 9:00 pm respectively.

Developed by Elizabeth Meriwether under the working title Chicks & Dicks, the series revolves around offbeat teacher Jess (Zooey Deschanel) after her moving into an LA loft with three men, Nick (Jake Johnson), Schmidt (Max Greenfield), and Winston (Lamorne Morris); Jess's best friend Cece (Hannah Simone) also appears regularly. The show combines comedy and drama elements as the characters, who are in their early thirties, deal with maturing relationships and career choices.

== Production ==
On March 31, 2015, New Girl was renewed for a fifth season. The show remained in production after wrapping season four in order to get a jump on season 5 ahead of Deschanel's maternity leave. Deschanel was absent in 6 episodes of the fifth season. The onscreen reason for her absence was that her character was sequestered for jury duty.

John Cho was the first guest announced after New Girl was renewed for season 5. Fred Armisen, Stephen Rannazzisi and Ally Maki all signed up to guest star this season.

Megan Fox was cast in the role of Reagan and temporarily filled in for Zooey Deschanel who pre-taped her episodes in the spring before taking a maternity leave. This season did not premiere in the autumn of 2015, but instead in January 2016, with what Fox states to be "its first-ever season of virtually uninterrupted originals." Damon Wayans, Jr. made his return for a two episode arc this season.

== Cast and characters ==
=== Main cast ===
- Zooey Deschanel as Jessica "Jess" Day
- Jake Johnson as Nick Miller
- Max Greenfield as Schmidt
- Lamorne Morris as Winston Bishop
- Hannah Simone as Cece

=== Special guest cast ===
- Megan Fox as Reagan
- Damon Wayans Jr. as Coach

=== Recurring cast ===
- Curtis Armstrong as Principal Foster
- Steve Agee as Outside Dave
- Meaghan Rath as May
- Peter Gallagher as Gavin
- David Walton as Sam
- Nasim Pedrad as Aly Nelson
- Nelson Franklin as Robby
- Fred Melamed as J. Cronkite Valley-Forge
- Rebecca Reid as Nadia

=== Guest cast ===
- John Cho as Daniel Grant
- Anna George as Priyanka
- Rob Riggle as Big Schmidt
- Taran Killam as Fred
- Julie Hagerty as Nancy
- Henry Winkler as Flip
- Sam Richardson as Dunston
- Fred Armisen as Brandon
- Stephen Rannazzisi as Todd Ploons
- Ally Maki as Kumiko
- Busy Philipps as Connie
- Sonequa Martin-Green as Rhonda
- apl.de.ap as himself
- Kiersey Clemons as KC
- Bill Burr as Bob
- Lennon Parham as Carol
- Ian Roberts as Billy
- Clea DuVall as Camilla
- Demetri Martin as Juror 237B/Gary
- Elizabeth Berkley Lauren as Becky Cavatappi
- Lucy Punch as Genevieve
- Gillian Vigman as Kim
- Kal Penn as Tripp
- Nora Dunn as Lou
- Kim Wayans as Susan
- Caitlin FitzGerald as Diane

== Episodes ==
No. overall	No. in season	Title	Directed by	Written by	Original release date	Prod. code	U.S. viewers (millions)
95	1	"Big Mama P"	Erin O'Malley	Berkley Johnson	January 5, 2016	5ATM03	3.33
Schmidt and Cece give the honor of best man and maid of honor to Nick and Jess, respectively. Jess plans an elaborate engagement party for the couple, with the intent of surprising Cece with a visit from her mother, Priyanka (Anna George). Nick is given the responsibility of picking up Cece's mother from the airport, but picks up the wrong woman. After saving a boy's life from under the weight of a car, Winston becomes tired of being labeled as a hero instead of being known for his pranking side.
96	2	"What About Fred"	Eric Appel	Matt Fusfeld & Alex Cuthbertson	January 12, 2016	5ATM01	3.25
Jess has a hard time relating to her new boyfriend Fred (Taran Killam), and would rather spend time with his fun loving parents Flip and Nancy (Henry Winkler and Julie Hagerty). Nick and Schmidt are officially co-owners of the bar, and Schmidt's strict rules of the establishment puts pressure on Nick to be a tougher boss.
97	3	"Jury Duty"	Trent O'Donnell	Josh Malmuth & Nina Pedrad	January 19, 2016	5ATM02	2.95
Jess is thrilled when she is called for jury duty, but an opportunity to be acting principal presents itself with her now wanting to get out of jury duty. Nick and Cece's constant bickering about the apartment rules puts Schmidt between them.
98	4	"No Girl"	Elizabeth Meriwether	Rob Rosell	January 26, 2016	5ATM04	2.84
With Jess still in jury duty, Nick rents out the loft to pay for Schmidt's bachelor party that they plan on having in Tokyo. Winston thinks that KC is cheating on him, so he asks Cece for advice to get even with her.
99	5	"Bob & Carol & Nick & Schmidt"	Jake Johnson	Rob Rosell	February 2, 2016	5ATM05	2.94
Nick's cousin Bob (Bill Burr) and his wife Carol (Lennon Parham) want to use Nick's sperm to have a baby. Winston helps Cece buy a wedding dress.
100	6	"Reagan"	Trent O'Donnell	Kim Rosenstock	February 9, 2016	5ATM06	3.10
Nick tries to get Reagan (Megan Fox), an attractive bisexual pharmaceutical sales representative, to temporarily move into the loft while Jess is still in jury duty. Schmidt learns that Cece and Reagan had a sexual encounter years ago, making him uncomfortable.
101	7	"Wig"	Christine Gernon	David Feeney	February 16, 2016	5ATM07	2.80
Nick has a hard time being comfortable around Reagan, so he spends a lot of his time in the loft in Schmidt's room, even during the time that Schmidt wants to have sex with Cece. Winston helps Reagan break up with her most recent fling Camilla (Clea DuVall).
102	8	"The Decision"	Trent O'Donnell	Luvh Rakhe	February 23, 2016	5ATM08	2.68
When Nick and Winston are unable to make decisions on anything, Reagan puts pressure on them to decide among themselves on who should have sex with her. While searching for the perfect wedding venue, Schmidt and Cece run into his old college bully Benjamin (David Neher) and his fiancée Mimi (Angela Trimbur).
103	9	"Heat Wave"	Erin O'Malley	Matt Fusfeld & Alex Cuthbertson	March 1, 2016	5ATM09	2.62
A heat wave hits the city, with Nick stubbornly refusing Reagan's offer of hanging out in her air-conditioned room. The back and forth ultimately leads to Nick and Reagan to finally express their romantic feelings for each other. Winston finds that people take him a lot more seriously when he uses his "cop voice". Cece refuses to go to a news broadcasting audition, which forces Schmidt to use his own "cop voice" to make her go.
104	10	"Goosebumps Walkaway"	Trent O'Donnell	Berkley Johnson	March 8, 2016	5ATM10	2.65
Jess finally comes home from jury duty. Reagan's last day in town closely arrives, however she is reluctant to fully express her romantic feelings for Nick. Schmidt and Cece accompany Winston to his freestyle dancing group. Note: Despite Fox promoting this episode as the 100th episode, it is actually the 104th episode produced and aired. "Reagan" is the actual 100th episode of the series.
105	11	"The Apartment"	Christine Gernon	Nina Pedrad	March 15, 2016	5ATM11	2.30
Jess becomes overwhelmed by the workload given by her new principal Becky Cavatappi (Elizabeth Berkley Lauren), while also helping Cece move out of her apartment to move into the loft with Jess and the guys. While Cece packs up her things, she begins to have second thoughts about marrying Schmidt. Winston becomes tired of hearing Aly talk about her boyfriend, so he is given a new partner named Dunston (Sam Richardson), who has similar interests as him, but is way more incompetent. A flasher comes in and out of the bar, with Nick not really having a problem with him, which has Schmidt concerned.
106	12	"D-Day"	Michael Schultz	Josh Malmuth	March 22, 2016	5ATM12	2.25
When Schmidt becomes highly stressed from planning the wedding, and with Cece getting a new job, Jess decides take over with some of the wedding preparations. When getting champagne for the wedding, Jess falls for Gavin (Peter Gallagher), a charming wine store owner, who she later finds out is Schmidt's father. Nick and Winston argue over who has the tougher profession.
107	13	"Sam, Again"	Steve Welch	Ethan Sandler & Adrian Wenner	March 29, 2016	5ATM13	2.21
Jess applies for a new teaching job at a more subdued, free-spirited school run by Genevieve (Lucy Punch), who she later learns is dating Sam (David Walton). Schmidt has Nick and Cece quarantined, when they both get sick, so he doesn't get sick himself right before he plans on doing a big presentation at work. Winston is nervous about going on a date, to get over being heartbroken by Aly.
108	14	"300 Feet"	Trent O'Donnell	Sophia Lear	April 12, 2016	5ATM14	2.65
Sam gets a restraining order on Jess. Presh, a fancy bar across the street owned by Connie (Busy Philipps), becomes competition for The Griffin, Nick and Schmidt's bar.
109	15	"Jeff Day"	Jay Chandrasekhar	Joe Wengert	April 19, 2016	5ATM15	1.92
Jess and Sam are back together, which causes tension between him and Nick. When buying a new car, Jess creates a male alter-ego named "Jeff Day" to deal with Billy (Ian Roberts), a sexist salesman. Schmidt and Cece become worried that Winston's newest girlfriend Rhonda (Sonequa Martin-Green), is way too much into pulling pranks, and wanting Winston to revoke his plus one invitation for her to come to their wedding.
110	16	"Helmet"	Josh Greenbaum	Sarah Nevada Smith	April 19, 2016	5ATM18	1.92
Jess has a sex dream about Nick, which involved an old Chicago Bears helmet that Nick gave her when they dated. This is especially stressful for Jess as she is about to meet Sam's parents. Aly's boyfriend Tripp (Kal Penn), an agent for animal actors, competes with Winston and his cat Furguson to get his own prized cat Patches a role in the next Avatar film.
111	17	"Road Trip"	Trent O'Donnell	Noah Garfinkel	April 26, 2016	5ATM16	2.42
Schmidt questions his manhood, after being too scared to protect Cece from a hostile driver during a traffic run-in. To come off as more manly, Schmidt, Nick and Winston along with Big Schmidt (Rob Riggle), Robby (Nelson Franklin) and J. Cronkite Valley-Forge (Fred Melamed), take a road trip to the desert for Schmidt's bachelor party.
112	18	"A Chill Day In"	Erin O'Malley	Sarah Tapscott	April 26, 2016	5ATM17	1.87
While the guys are at their bachelor party, Jess and Cece stay in and smoke marijuana. After destroying a bread maker given by Schmidt's mother, Jess and Cece go to the store to get it replaced. In doing so they run into Aly and Tripp, who are having difficulties in their relationship.
113	19	"Dress"	Trent O'Donnell	David Feeney & Josh Malmuth	May 3, 2016	5ATM19	2.27
Jess procrastinates when tasked to alter Cece's wedding dress, so Schmidt helps Jess by having her make alterations to it in the unused men's room at his job. With Winston and Aly now dating, they have difficulty keeping their relationship a secret from the other police officers. Nick awaits a response from Reagan after asking her in a text to be his plus one for Schmidt and Cece's wedding.
114	20	"Return to Sender"	Russ Alsobrook	Veronica McCarthy	May 3, 2016	5ATM20	1.88
Sam reunites with Diane (Caitlin FitzGerald), an old medical school colleague, who has unresolved romantic feelings for him, putting Jess in the middle. Nick is worried for Schmidt, fearing that Gavin hasn't stopped his "deadbeat dad" ways. Winston's feelings are hurt when Sam refuses to wear a bird shirt that Winston gave him.
115	21	"Wedding Eve"	Trent O'Donnell	Nina Pedrad & Kim Rosenstock	May 10, 2016	5ATM21	2.34
Jess finds a wedding ring in Sam's jacket pocket and becomes nervous thinking that Sam will propose to her. On the day before Schmidt and Cece's wedding, Schmidt's mom Louise (Nora Dunn) and her life partner Susan (Kim Wayans) stay over at the loft. Winston fears that he may have scared off Aly by referring to her as a "bride". Coach (Damon Wayans, Jr.) is back from New York to visit for the wedding.
116	22	"Landing Gear"	Erin O'Malley	Luvh Rakhe	May 10, 2016	5ATM22	2.17
On the day of Schmidt and Cece's wedding, Schmidt travels to Portland to get Cece's mom, Priyanka to come. However, he ends up stuck on the plane, still on the tarmac, missing the wedding. Reagan visits for the wedding with Nick wanting to make the move of having a steady relationship. Jess, who reveals that Sam broke up with her the day before, realizes that she still may have romantic feelings for Nick. While Schmidt is missing the wedding, Jess asks Winston to revert to his pranking ways in an attempt to stall the wedding until the groom arrives.
