= New Girl season 6 =

Season of television series

New Girl
- Season 6
- DVD cover art
- Starring: Zooey Deschanel; Jake Johnson; Max Greenfield; Lamorne Morris; Hannah Simone
- No. of episodes: 22

Release
- Original network: Fox
- Original release: September 20, 2016 – April 4, 2017

Season chronology
- ← Previous; Season 5 Next → Season 7

The sixth season of the American television sitcom New Girl premiered on Fox on September 20, 2016, at 8:30 pm (Eastern), and concluded on April 4, 2017. During the series, it moved to 8:00 pm (Eastern) in early 2017.

Developed by Elizabeth Meriwether under the working title Chicks & Dicks, the series revolves around offbeat teacher Jess (Zooey Deschanel) after her moving into an LA loft with three men, Nick (Jake Johnson), Schmidt (Max Greenfield), and Winston (Lamorne Morris); Jess's best friend Cece (Hannah Simone) also appears regularly. The characters, who are in their early thirties, deal with maturing relationships and career choices.

== Production ==
New Girl was renewed for a sixth season on April 12, 2016. The season premiere marked Zooey Deschanel's directorial debut with the episode picking up three months after the events of the season five finale. TVLine confirmed Megan Fox's return midseason in an eight episode arc. At the 2016 Television Critics Association Summer Tour, FOX announced that this season would include a one-hour crossover with Brooklyn Nine-Nine, which aired on October 11. Only Deschanel appears on Brooklyn Nine-Nine, while Andy Samberg, Andre Braugher, Joe Lo Truglio and Chelsea Peretti appear on New Girl.

== Cast and characters ==
=== Main cast ===
- Zooey Deschanel as Jessica "Jess" Day
- Jake Johnson as Nick Miller
- Max Greenfield as Schmidt
- Lamorne Morris as Winston Bishop
- Hannah Simone as Cece

=== Special guest cast ===
- Megan Fox as Reagan
- Damon Wayans Jr. as Coach
- Andy Samberg as Jake Peralta
- Andre Braugher as Captain Raymond Holt
- Chelsea Peretti as Gina Linetti
- Joe Lo Truglio as Charles Boyle

=== Recurring cast ===
- Curtis Armstrong as Principal Foster
- Steve Agee as Outside Dave
- Peter Gallagher as Gavin
- Nasim Pedrad as Aly Nelson
- Nelson Franklin as Robby
- Rebecca Reid as Nadia
- Trent Garrett as Donovan

=== Guest cast ===
- Kate Flannery as Mary Ellen
- Nora Dunn as Lou
- David Hornsby as Ed Warner
- Lucy Punch as Genevieve
- Billy Gardell as Jason
- Darlene Love as herself
- Gillian Vigman as Kim
- Gordon Ramsay as himself
- Sonequa Martin-Green as Rhonda
- Jon Daly as Professor PP Hornsyld
- Rob Reiner as Bob Day
- Olivia Rodrigo as Terrinea
- Anna Maria Horsford as Charmaine
- Donna Pescow as Priscilla
- June Diane Raphael as Sadie
- Brian Huskey as Merle Streep
- Fred Willard as Beezus

== Episodes ==
No. overall	No. in season	Title	Directed by	Written by	Original release date	Prod. code	U.S. viewers (millions)
117	1	"House Hunt"	Zooey Deschanel	Luvh Rakhe	September 20, 2016	6ATM01	2.31
Jess becomes so overwhelmed by her re-ignited romantic feelings for Nick to the point that she takes up strange new hobbies, and can hardly speak in his presence when he comes back to town early from his New Orleans summer trip with Reagan. Schmidt and Cece have difficulties finding a house especially with Aly's incompetent younger sister Leslie (Ayden Mayeri) as their real estate agent, who Schmidt and Cece want fired. So Winston takes it upon himself to spare Leslie's feelings by having her find a house for him, even though he does not need one.
118	2	"Hubbedy Bubby"	Steve Welch	Sarah Tapscott	September 27, 2016	6ATM02	2.03
While campaigning for Hillary Clinton, Jess and Cece make a bet with Schmidt that if they sign up five new registered voters, he will vote for Clinton. Jess and Cece go to a university to try to sign up female students. They are initially rejected, until they bring alcohol in and are welcomed. The students sign with gag names and are revealed to be Trump supporters, so Jess and Cece leave. Nick asks Winston for help when he has difficulty talking to Reagan on the phone.
119	3	"Single and Sufficient"	Michael Schultz	Kim Rosenstock & Joe Wengert	October 4, 2016	6ATM03	2.03
Schmidt and Cece go on a glamping trip, and bring along Jess' single friends, which is actually a group made up of single by choice people, led by Robby (Nelson Franklin). While on the trip Schmidt and Cece detect that Jess and Robby are developing romantic feelings for each other, despite the strict group rule of no romance, especially among members. Aly comes home from her Quantico training and makes up for lost time with Winston, by having a lot of sex on the glamping trip. Nick seeks advice on his new book from Schmidt, however, Schmidt advises him not to use any notes, with Nick having a hard time continuing to write.
120	4	"Homecoming"	Trent O'Donnell	Matt Fusfeld & Alex Cuthbertson	October 11, 2016	6ATM04	1.95
The gang travels to New York to accompany Schmidt who is receiving a special award from his old high school. Jess faces her fears of coming back to New York, despite having a terrible history with the city. She ends up having her car commandeered by Det. Jake Peralta (Andy Samberg), who ends up wrecking it into a newspaper stand and goes to the ninety-ninth precinct to deal with the situation. In the end, she learns something about why she had such a terrible history with the city. Meanwhile, in an effort to get money to get to Schmidt's old neighborhood in Long Island, Nick and Winston become buskers at a subway station. Schmidt's mother Louise (Nora Dunn) and Cece frequently compete to please Schmidt. Note: This episode crosses over with the Brooklyn Nine-Nine episode "The Night Shift". Det. Charles Boyle (Joe Lo Truglio), Captain Raymond Holt (Andre Braugher), and Administrator Gina Linetti (Chelsea Peretti) from Brooklyn Nine-Nine also make cameo appearances in this episode.
121	5	"Jaipur Aviv"	Erin O'Malley	Berkley Johnson	October 18, 2016	6ATM05	1.81
Schmidt and Cece begin renovating their new home that they have named "Jaipur Aviv", but Schmidt frequently disagrees with Cece on designing decisions for the house. Jess, Nick and Winston agree that they need to find a fourth roommate for the loft, and Nick suggests that Reagan moves in, with the gang each coming to a vote on the decision.
122	6	"Ready"	Trent O'Donnell	Noah Garfinkel	November 15, 2016	6ATM07	1.94
Jess finally feels its time to begin dating again, and Schmidt once again suggests that she dates Robby, due to them having common interests. Nick promotes Cece to manager of The Griffin while he is busy working on his novel. Attractive women flirt with Winston even though he is still dating Aly.
123	7	"Last Thanksgiving"	Trent O'Donnell	Joni Lefkowitz	November 22, 2016	6ATM08	1.76
Schmidt's father, Gavin, (Peter Gallagher) comes over to the loft for Thanksgiving, however he is recovering from a recent breakup, putting a damper on the father-son bonding time that Schmidt planned. Jess has difficulty telling Robby that she sees him as just a friend, all while Robby is recovering from his injuries that Jess is partly responsible for. Reagan bails at the last minute on showing up for Thanksgiving dinner at the loft, leaving Nick disappointed.
124	8	"James Wonder"	Trent O'Donnell	Ethan Sandler & Adrian Wenner	November 29, 2016	6ATM06	1.81
Jess sees an opening for the principal position at her school, as her boss Genevieve (Lucy Punch) is resigning. However, in order to clinch the position Jess has to sweet talk Ed Warner (David Hornsby), the president of the parent's council. Winston who is interested in police undercover work, helps Jess with her quandary, with his alter ego "James Wonder", a name he created from the names of his two favorite singers James Blunt and Stevie Wonder. "James" is a landscape architect and instantly becomes friends with Ed and catches the romantic eye of Genevieve. Nick still has not given Schmidt and Cece a wedding present, feeling restricted by their wedding registry, he decides to give them a gift of his own choice.
125	9	"Es Good"	Trent O'Donnell	Rob Rosell	December 6, 2016	6ATM09	1.73
After Jess tells Robby she wants to take things slow, he tells her he's already seeing other people, specifically dating a woman named Babs (Brytni Sarpy). This leads Jess to ask out Stavros (George Lako), one of the construction workers working on Schmidt and Cece's house, and invites Robby and Babs on a double date. Schmidt and Nick try to speed up construction on Schmidt and Cece's kitchen, after spending time with Jason (Billy Gardell) the contractor, who they believe he is trying to scam them. Cece and Winston find themselves getting too invested in Jess and Robby's relationship, to the point they question whether their own love lives have reached a boring standstill.
126	10	"Christmas Eve Eve"	Trent O'Donnell	Sophia Lear	December 13, 2016	6ATM10	1.62
Jess has the gang be each other's Secret Santa, despite the fact that every one except Jess are not interested in celebrating Christmas this year. Jess' Secret Santa surprise for Nick, is having Reagan fly from Seattle to visit, with Jess having difficulty keeping the secret.
127	11	"Raisin's Back"	Dana Fox	Eliot Glazer	January 3, 2017	6ATM11	2.48
Reagan temporarily moves back into the loft while she is in town for work. Nick purposely becomes standoffish to avoid smothering her. Jess reluctantly gets in the middle of Nick and Reagan's relationship after learning secrets from them both. Schmidt, an avid fan of Electronic dance music (EDM), wants to pick the music for The Griffin, after Winston breaks the jukebox. However, after Cece and Winston tell Schmidt that his taste in music is terrible, they make a bet that they can fashion their own EDM song to see if Schmidt can tell the difference between that and a legitimate EDM song.
128	12	"The Cubicle"	Jay Chandrasekhar	Kim Rosenstock	January 10, 2017	6ATM12	2.48
The loftmates surprise Cece with a cubicle in the dining room area for her new job as a modeling manager. Cece's first client Donovan gets off to a promising start at a photo shoot for Winston's police station, but later decides to become an actual police officer, causing problems for the next assignment as a product model sponsored by Schmidt's company. Jess offers to pay for Robby's medical bill, until she realizes that Robby only gave her a small portion for her to pay and that the bill was astronomically high. Meanwhile, Nick gives Reagan his novel, "The Pepperwood Chronicles", to read after everyone else in the loft is shocked that she has not read it yet.
129	13	"Cece's Boys"	Trent O'Donnell	Joe Wengert	January 17, 2017	6ATM13	2.37
When Cece's clients start getting picked off by larger agencies the day of an audition, Jess and Reagan go to The Griffin to recruit new potential models. Their search is unsuccessful but for three: Dean, an attractive yet clueless man; and Kirby and Bruce, two not-so-attractive friends whom Jess thinks have inner beauty. Meanwhile, after Nick and Winston learn that Coach and May have moved to North Carolina, Schmidt becomes concerned that their friendships are fading away, prompting the guys to find a ritual to bond them, leading them to a spa day which does not quite turn out as expected.
130	14	"The Hike"	Josh Greenbaum	Sarah Tapscott	January 24, 2017	6ATM14	2.35
Jess and Robby go hiking. Aly is back in town, so Winston throws a party with Schmidt and Cece hosting at their mostly completed house. Winston invites Aly's entire family, only to find out she has a large number of relatives and that she is not happy about seeing all of them. After a series of unfortunate circumstances, Jess and Robby end up in a cave and discover the shocking truth about why they are so similar in personality and preferences.
131	15	"Glue"	Trent O'Donnell	Marquita J. Robinson	February 7, 2017	6ATM15	2.23
When Nick's novel The Pepperwood Chronicles gets rejected by a publisher, Reagan manages to get a deal with a bookstore to sell Nick's book and have him do a reading of the story. While Nick and Jess are making copies of the book, however, the scent of the glue makes them high. Elsewhere, Winston asks Cece and Schmidt for help proposing to Aly, enlisting them to keep her distracted.
132	16	"Operation: Bobcat"	Steve Welch	Lamar Woods	February 14, 2017	6ATM16	2.13
On Valentine's Day, Schmidt buys a new suit to try to impress his boss so he gets a promotion. However, when Cece surprises him to celebrate their "Bone-iversary", things do not go as planned, requiring help from Nick. Jess spends her Valentine's Day alone (and with Gordon Ramsay) trying to convince everyone that she is not sad, while at the same time helping Winston propose to Aly.
133	17	"Rumspringa"	Josh Greenbaum	Sophia Lear & Noah Garfinkel	February 21, 2017	6ATM17	2.25
Jess and Schmidt become nervous about starting their new job positions, especially Jess who was promoted to her life-long dream job as principal. Nick and Schmidt take Jess away to spend the day in Solvang but they later get trapped in a cellar room. Winston tries to persuade Rhonda (Sonequa Martin-Green), who he had previously inadvertently married in a prank, to get a divorce so that he can marry Aly. However, Rhonda will only agree to it if they can help her with another prank.
134	18	"Young Adult"	Jay Chandrasekhar	Jason Daugherity	February 28, 2017	6ATM18	2.09
Jess wants to be considered a "cool" principal, but none of the kids give her any attention until she discovers they are big fans of Nick's book The Pepperwood Chronicles. She brings Nick, who has been flailing around for ideas for a sequel, to school and gets their attention, until the students take advantage of her much to her chagrin. Schmidt hires an assistant named Jeremy (Asif Ali), who goes above and beyond to satisfy Schmidt's needs. Winston and Cece compete with a woman named Gil (Mary Holland) who claims that Winston's cat Furguson is her cat Sweatshirt.
135	19	"Socalyalcon VI"	Trent O'Donnell	Berkley Johnson	March 14, 2017	6ATM20	1.79
Jess helps Nick get ready for a literary fan convention named Socalyalcon, while doing so, Cece helps her come to the realization that a lot of the stuff she does for Nick are "girlfriend" things, and soon starts doing the same kind of things for Reagan. Schmidt and Cece are fully moved into their new home and become overstressed out about intruders coming into the house. Aly reveals a "dark" secret about her past to Winston.
136	20	"Misery"	Erin O'Malley	Luvh Rakhe	March 21, 2017	6ATM21	1.98
Still conflicted over romantic feelings for Nick, Jess stays in her hometown of Portland to take care of her father Bob (Rob Reiner). When Reagan neglects to tell Nick about a potential job promotion, he begins questioning wanting more emotionally from their relationship. Aly prepares to meet Winston's mother Charmaine (Anna Maria Horsford) for the first time. However, Winston has not told Charmaine that he is a police officer now, and she still thinks that he works in radio. Despite having their own house now, Schmidt and Cece continually come into the loft, even when they are not wanted.
137	21	"San Diego"	Trent O'Donnell	David Feeney & Rob Rosell	March 28, 2017	6ATM22	2.16
Jess continues to be conflicted over her romantic feelings for Nick, while still staying with her father Bob in Portland. Bob tells Jess that his wife, Ashley, left him 6 months ago, so Jess sets him up with Priscilla (Donna Pescow), the owner of the ice cream establishment that Bob frequents, and they hit it off very quickly. Nick has finally decided to break up with Reagan, by taking a train ride to San Diego, and leaving her on the train to avoid direct conflict. To further his career in the business world, Schmidt finally decides to uses his first name, Winston, which causes conflict with Winston Bishop.
138	22	"Five Stars for Beezus"	Erin O'Malley	Elizabeth Meriwether	April 4, 2017	6ATM19	2.00
Nick and Reagan have broken up, with Jess thinking about using the opportunity to express her romantic feelings for Nick. However, at a book reading for The Pepperwood Chronicles, Jess reads signs from Nick that he is not interested in getting back together with her, despite that being far from the truth. With some convincing from Schmidt, Nick realizes his romantic feelings for Jess. Cece's gynecologist Sadie (June Diane Raphael) reveals that Cece is pregnant, with everyone but Cece knowing about her forthcoming baby. Aly receives the phone number of Winston's dad who walked out on him and his mother, and has difficulty calling him. Jess has fully emptied her room and begins to leave to Portland, when she hears “Time of my life" she rushes back to the apartment to profess her love to Nick. Nick also sees Jess, and after many failed attempts to see each other face to face, Nick and Jess are finally reunited in the elevator, the elevator door closes and when it opens in the lobby, the two are kissing.
