= New Girl season 7 =

Season of television series

New Girl
- Season 7
- DVD cover art
- Starring: Zooey Deschanel; Jake Johnson; Max Greenfield; Lamorne Morris; Hannah Simone; Danielle and Rhiannon Rockoff
- No. of episodes: 8

Release
- Original network: Fox
- Original release: April 10 – May 15, 2018

Season chronology
- ← Previous; Season 6

The seventh and final season of the American television sitcom New Girl premiered on Fox on April 10, 2018, at 9:30 pm ET, and concluded on May 15, 2018. The final season consists of 8 episodes.

Developed by Elizabeth Meriwether under the working title Chicks & Dicks, the series revolves around offbeat teacher Jess (Zooey Deschanel) after her moving into an LA loft with three men, Nick (Jake Johnson), Schmidt (Max Greenfield), and Winston (Lamorne Morris); Jess's best friend Cece (Hannah Simone) also appears regularly. The characters, who are in their thirties, deal with maturing relationships and career choices.

== Cast and characters ==
=== Main cast ===
- Zooey Deschanel as Jessica "Jess" Day
- Jake Johnson as Nick Miller
- Max Greenfield as Schmidt
- Lamorne Morris as Winston Bishop
- Hannah Simone as Cece
- Danielle Rockoff and Rhiannon Rockoff as Ruth

=== Special guest cast ===
- Damon Wayans Jr. as Coach

=== Recurring cast ===
- Steve Agee as Outside Dave
- Rebecca Reid as Nadia
- Brian Huskey as Merle Streep
- Dermot Mulroney as Russell
- Nasim Pedrad as Aly
- Rob Reiner as Bob Day
- Nelson Franklin as Robby

=== Guest cast ===
- David Walton as Sam
- Sam Richardson as Dunston
- Ayden Mayeri as Leslie
- Gillian Vigman as Kim
- J. B. Smoove as Van Bishop
- Sarah Baker as Judith
- Quinta Brunson as Annabelle
- Jamie Lee Curtis as Joan
- June Diane Raphael as Sadie
- Brian Posehn as Bio Teacher
- Curtis Armstrong as Principal Foster
- Zoe Lister Jones as Fawn Moscato

== Episodes ==
No. overall	No. in season	Title	Directed by	Written by	Original release date	Prod. code	U.S. viewers (millions)
139	1	"About Three Years Later"	Erin O'Malley	Berkley Johnson	April 10, 2018	7ATM01	1.83
Three years after the events of the season six finale, Jess and Nick return to Los Angeles after a worldwide tour promoting Nick's latest Pepperwood Chronicles novel. Within that time Jess and Nick are still not married which worries Jess' father Bob. Schmidt and Cece celebrate their daughter Ruth's third birthday, however their house party soon goes out of control. Schmidt has also grown a mustache, which bothers Nick. Winston and Aly are expecting their first child, but Aly gets stressed when Winston wants her to decide on their pregnancy glamour photo.
140	2	"Tuesday Meeting"	Josh Greenbaum	Sarah Tapscott	April 17, 2018	7ATM02	1.58
Jess feels neglected at work; after getting advice from a drunk and caffeinated Cece, she confronts her boss Russell about it. When Nick's draft on a new Pepperwood Chronicles novel is turned down by his editor Merle, Nick gets writer's block, so Schmidt and Winston try to help him with ideas. When Ruth and Schmidt visit Nick at the loft, Winston sees correlations between the lives of the three former roommates and the Three Men and a Baby films.
141	3	"Lillypads"	Trent O'Donnell	J. J. Philbin	April 24, 2018	7ATM03	1.51
Schmidt and Cece ask Jess to help Ruth prepare for her audition for a prestigious pre-school; however, Schmidt disagrees with and constantly intrudes on Jess's teaching process. Nick must write a twenty-page draft on his new book, while also helping Winston, who has been promoted to detective, get over his stage fright in testifying in a court case.
142	4	"Where the Road Goes"	Michael Schultz	Noah Garfinkel	May 1, 2018	7ATM04	1.33
The gang celebrates the one-year anniversary of Furguson's death, and everyone is worried that Winston has not had his "big cry" over the cat. Sensing animosity between Nick and their former roommate Coach, Jess asks Nick to open up, and learns that Coach had borrowed a large amount of money from Nick, and reveals she might have contributed to Furguson's death. Meanwhile, Schmidt gets worried about what Cece would do if she were widowed.
143	5	"Godparents"	Lamorne Morris	Lamar Woods	May 8, 2018	7ATM05	1.40
Winston and Aly select Jess to be their baby's godparent. Schmidt returns to work and finds that the company has changed. Cece, who has to deal with Ruth that day, forgets her phone which has the gate code to enter the preschool, and asks Nick, who thinks he is a godparent by relationship to Jess, to retrieve it. Meanwhile, Jess surprises Winston by finding his missing father Van (JB Smoove), but Aly later tells Jess that she made a mistake.
144	6	"Mario"	Jay Chandrasekhar	Joe Wengert	May 8, 2018	7ATM06	1.24
Schmidt and Cece plan a sex date by hiring a babysitter and going out, but Cece mentions that she is ovulating and is ready to have another baby. Winston tries out some glasses that allow him to see color for the first time. Nick has been planning a dinner date leading to the marriage proposal, but Jess surprises Nick by preparing the apartment for a home visit in order to adopt a dog.
145	7	"The Curse of the Pirate Bride"	Josh Greenbaum	Ann Kim	May 15, 2018	7ATM07	1.47
Following their rehearsal dinner, Nick and Jess ignore the superstition about sleeping together the night before the wedding being bad luck. However, the next day, Jess injures her eye and has to wear an eyepatch, while Nick loses his book deal. Aly experiences labor pains, and Russell takes an opportunity to be alone with Jess to woo her one more time.
146	8	"Engram Pattersky"	Erin O'Malley	Story by : Dave Finkel & Brett Baer; Teleplay by : Elizabeth Meriwether	May 15, 2018	7ATM08	1.46
One month after getting married, Nick and Jess call Cece, Schmidt and Winston to inform them that they're being evicted by "Engram Pattersky", along with everyone else in the building. Jess tries to make everyone express their feelings about leaving the loft forever. Although the others have already let go, they see how much it means to Jess, so they go along with her activity, nostalgically going through old items and also trying things they have never done at the loft before. They then play True American: Packing Edition, during which a flash-forward is shown of them and their kids playing the game. After the truck is loaded, Winston reveals that the eviction was an elaborate hoax: "Engram Pattersky" is an anagram for "My Greatest Prank". Nick and Jess decide to move anyway, and the group drive off.

== Reception ==
On review aggregator website Rotten Tomatoes, the season holds an approval rating of 100% based on 10 reviews, with an average rating of 6.78. The site's critical consensus reads, "After seven years of friendship, New Girl signs off with a thoughtful, funny final season that bids a proper adieu to its colourful cast of characters."
