= Fixer-upper =

Property that will require maintenance work

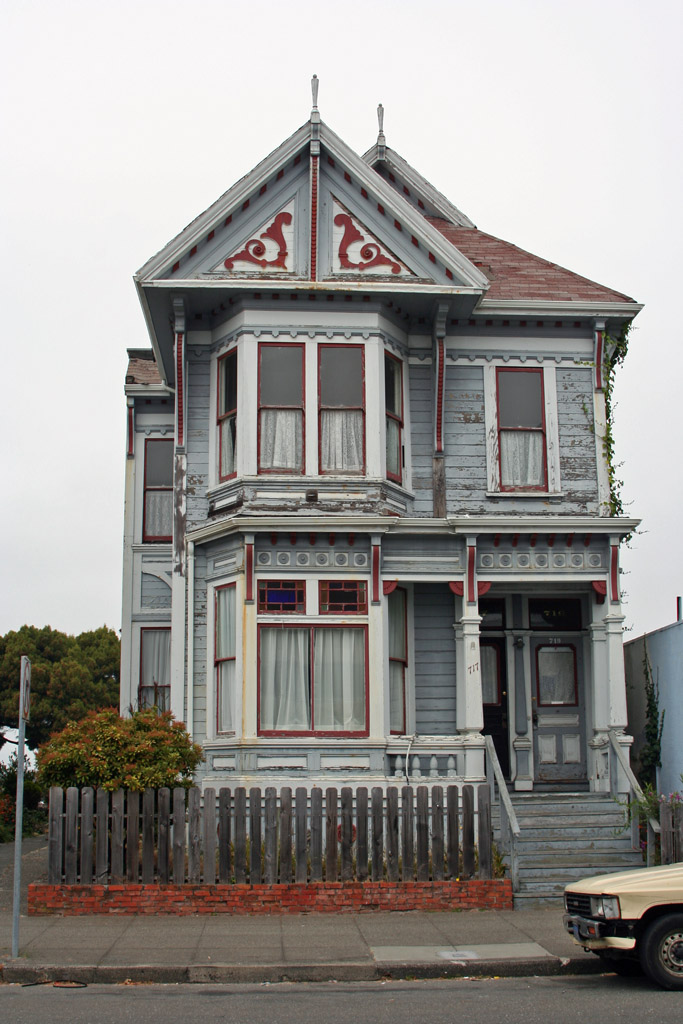
An older house like this one, usually in need of renovation, is a typical "fixer-upper"

In real estate vernacular, a fixer-upper is a property that will require repair (redecoration, reconstruction, or redesign), though it usually can be lived in or used as it is.

They are popular with buyers who wish to raise the property's potential value to get a return on their investment (a practice known as flipping), or as a starter home for buyers on a budget. Home-improvement television shows touting do-it-yourself renovation techniques have made fixer-uppers more popular, but during a real-estate downturn with newer homes available at depressed prices, there is often reduced interest. Inexperienced buyers frequently underestimate the amount and cost of repairs necessary to make a home livable or saleable. Structural and service issues, which may not be visible at first (such as a home's foundation or plumbing), can require expensive, professional contracting work.

== Film and television ==
Many comedy films have used fixer-upper renovations as a central part of the plot, among them:

- Are We Done Yet? (2007)
- The Money Pit (1986)
- Mr. Blandings Builds His Dream House (1948)
- George Washington Slept Here (1942)
- In the 2013 Disney animated movie Frozen, the trolls sing a song calling Kristoff a fixer upper.
- In the American sitcom New Girl, supporting newly-wed characters Cece and Schmidt renovate a fixer-upper house as a main plot point in the show's sixth season.

Flipping of rundown houses has also been the subject of various reality television shows, including:

- Fixer Upper
- Flip or Flop
- Flip That House
- Flip This House
- The Real Estate Pros
