= Genzlinger =

Genzlinger is a surname. Notable people with the surname include:

- Paul Genzlinger, character on the TV series New Girl
- Neil Genzlinger, American critic
