= I Live with Models =

- Genre: Sitcom
- Created by: Jon Foster; James Lamont
- Starring: David Hoffman; Brianne Howey; Rebecca Reid; Joseph May; Eric Aragon; Dave Fulton; Alex Beckett
- Country of origin: United Kingdom
- Original language: English
- No. of seasons: 2
- No. of episodes: 16

Production
- Running time: 20-22 minutes
- Production company: Roughcut Television

Original release
- Network: Comedy Central UK
- Release: 23 February 2015 – 28 March 2017

I Live with Models is a British television sitcom created by Jon Foster and James Lamont, which originally aired on Comedy Central UK from 23 February 2015. In March 2016 Comedy Central announced that they had ordered a second series, consisting of eight more episodes to be filmed and broadcast later that year.

== Overview ==
When regular guy Tommy is discovered as a hand model, he finds himself "living the dream" with three young models first in a Miami, and then in a New York City apartment.

== Cast ==
=== Main ===
- David Hoffman as Tommy Bishop
- Brianne Howey as Scarlet Wayde
- Rebecca Reid as Anna (series 1)
- Eric Aragon as Enrique (series 1)
- Joseph May as Luke (series 1)
- Lydia Rose Bewley as Jess (series 2)
- Kamilla Alnes as Molly (series 2)
- Karan Soni as Marshall (series 2)

=== Supporting ===
- Alex Beckett as Seth, Tommy's friend
- Dave Fulton as Vinny (series 1)
- Don McGilvray as Gummy Joe (series 1)
- Theo Cross as Gabe (pilot episode only)

== Episodes ==
=== Series overview ===
Series of I Live with Models
| Series | Episodes | Originally released | |
| Series | Episodes | First released | Last released |
|---|---|---|---|
| 1 | 8 | 23 February 2015 | 13 April 2015 |
| 2 | 8 | 6 February 2017 | 28 March 2017 |

=== Series 1 (2015) ===
| No. overall | No. in series | Title | Directed by | Written by | Original release date |
|---|---|---|---|---|---|
| 1 | 1 | "Pilot" | Ben Kellett | Seb Barwell, Jon Foster & James Lamont | 23 February 2015 |
When regular guy Tommy is discovered as a hand model, he finds himself 'living the dream' with three young models in a Miami apartment.
| 2 | 2 | "The Trip" | Ben Kellett | Seb Barwell, Jon Foster & James Lamont | 2 March 2015 |
Tommy is off to Japan but needs to get over his fear of bras to get the job done. Also, Anna meets her match in ego.
| 3 | 3 | "Pool Buddies" | Ben Kellett | Seb Barwell, Jon Foster & James Lamont | 9 March 2015 |
Tommy loses Seth as a pool partner when secrets of Tommy's past are revealed. Enrique steps in as Tommy's partner as reputations are on the line for the big match.
| 4 | 4 | "The Handbag" | Ben Kellett | Seb Barwell, Ben Edwards, Jon Foster & James Lamont | 16 March 2015 |
Tommy meets a new agent and becomes terrified of Luke's repercussions. Also, Anna finds a handbag full of treats and fancy memberships.
| 5 | 5 | "The Suit" | Ben Kellett | Seb Barwell, Paul Doolan, Jon Foster & James Lamont | 23 March 2015 |
Tommy splashes out on a flash suit that grabs the eye of a beautiful lady. However, the purchase leaves Tommy a little short. How long can he keep up the facade?
| 6 | 6 | "The Editor" | Ben Kellett | Seb Barwell, Jon Foster & James Lamont | 30 March 2015 |
Scarlet meets her fashion idol who turns out to have a taste for Tommy. Also, Anna convinces Enrique his room is haunted but she has a sleepy agenda.
| 7 | 7 | "Anna the Agent" | Ben Kellett | Seb Barwell, Ben Edwards, Jon Foster & James Lamont | 6 April 2015 |
Anna is fired by Luke and seeks revenge by stealing his phone and meeting clients to become an agent herself. Meanwhile, Scarlet has a hard time getting laughs at work.
| 8 | 8 | "Hurricane Party" | Ben Kellett | Seb Barwell, Jon Foster & James Lamont | 13 April 2015 |
A hurricane is near which means a hurricane party must commence. Will Scarlet and Tommy survive their fall out and the weather to make it back to the party?

=== Series 2 (2017) ===
| No. overall | No. in series | Title | Directed by | Written by | Original release date |
|---|---|---|---|---|---|
| 9 | 1 | "New York" | Ben Kellett | Mark Reisman | 6 February 2017 |
Tommy and Scarlet arrive in New York, looking to make it big. Scarlet gets the fear about their new agent and Tommy makes a bad first impression with the new roommates.
| 10 | 2 | "Jess Steals a Job" | Ben Kellett | Ian Gurvitz | 13 February 2017 |
When Molly's forced to lose weight for a job, Jess stands up for her - but in the process accidentally takes her job. Tommy's oldest friend Seth visits, forcing him to pretend his career is taking off.
| 11 | 3 | "The Hook-Up" | Ben Kellett | Gary Murphy & Maria Brown-Gallenberg | 21 February 2017 |
Tommy struggles to turn down sex with a woman, who he finds unbearable. Molly pretends to be in a relationship with Scarlet to boost her online following, but Scarlet doesn't know about it.
| 12 | 4 | "The Twofer" | Ben Kellett | Gary Murphy | 28 February 2017 |
Scarlet feels the guilt after betraying Tommy at a joint casting. When Molly takes pity on a geeky fan and agrees to be his prom date, Jess tries to get in on the action.
| 13 | 5 | "Don't Hit on Molly" | Ben Kellett | Ellie Taylor & Lucien Young | 7 March 2017 |
When Tommy and Molly start getting along, Jess and Scarlet see trouble ahead for the flat share. Jess lands a job with a difficult photographer and asks Scarlet to be her handler.
| 14 | 6 | "The Casino" | Ben Kellett | Ian Gurvitz | 14 March 2017 |
The gang face temptation when they accept shady work at a VIP event in Atlantic City. Jess reunites with an old crush, but can't let him find out why she's there.
| 15 | 7 | "Tommy's Dad" | Ben Kellett | Lucien Young | 21 March 2017 |
When his dad sets him up with a proper job, Tommy is reluctant to let him know that he's a hand model. Marshall signs another plus size model and Jess tries to prove she's a fake.
| 16 | 8 | "The Male Model" | Ben Kellett | Howard Gewirtz & Ian Gurvitz | 28 March 2017 |
Tommy develops a man crush when he becomes the hands of a top male model. Molly encourages Scarlet to loosen up and it turns out that getting high really helps her career.
