= List of New Girl characters =

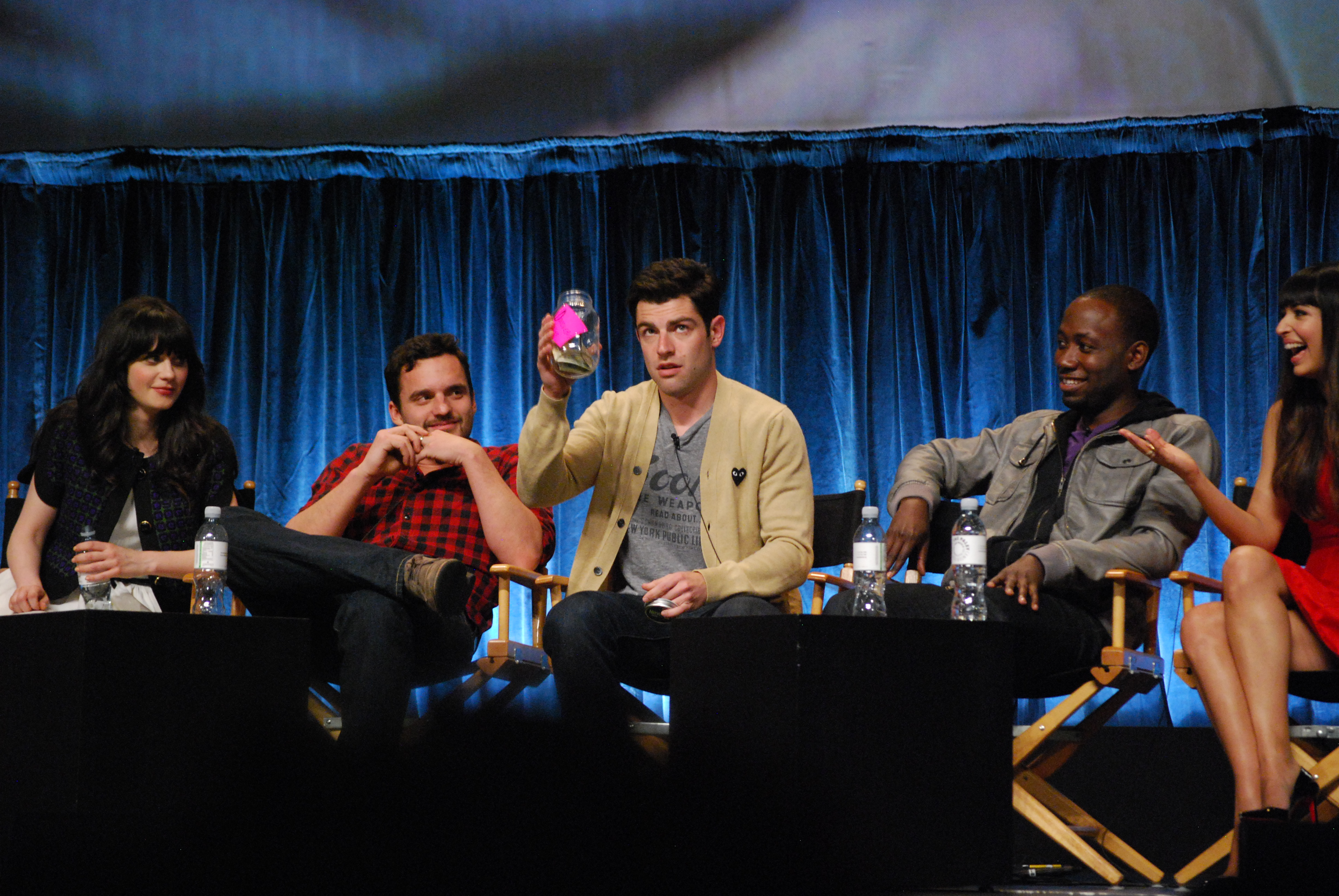
New Girl main cast members: Zooey Deschanel, Jake Johnson, Max Greenfield, Lamorne Morris, Hannah Simone.

New Girl is an American television sitcom created by Elizabeth Meriwether. The show, set in Los Angeles, depicts the interpersonal adventures of offbeat teacher Jess (Zooey Deschanel) after her spontaneous move into an apartment loft with three men: Nick (Jake Johnson), Schmidt (Max Greenfield), and Winston (Lamorne Morris). Jess' best friend Cece (Hannah Simone) and their former roommate Coach (Damon Wayans Jr.) regularly visit them. The show also features a number of characters that appear as love interests, acquaintances, or family members for the characters in multiple episodes in a season or across multiple seasons.

== Main characters ==
Summary of character appearances
Character	Portrayed by	Seasons						
Character	Portrayed by	1	2	3	4	5	6	7
Jessica Day	Zooey Deschanel	Main	Main	Main	Main	Main	Main	Main
Nick Miller	Jake Johnson	Main	Main	Main	Main	Main	Main	Main
Schmidt	Max Greenfield	Main	Main	Main	Main	Main	Main	Main
Cece Parikh	Hannah Simone	Main	Main	Main	Main	Main	Main	Main
Winston Bishop	Lamorne Morris	Main	Main	Main	Main	Main	Main	Main
Coach	Damon Wayans Jr.	Main (Note: Damon Wayans, Jr. was only credited as a part of the main cast in the pilot.)		Special Guest	Main	Special Guest	Special Guest	Special Guest
Ruth Parikh-Schmidt	Danielle Rockoff; Rhiannon Rockoff							Main

=== Jessica Day ===
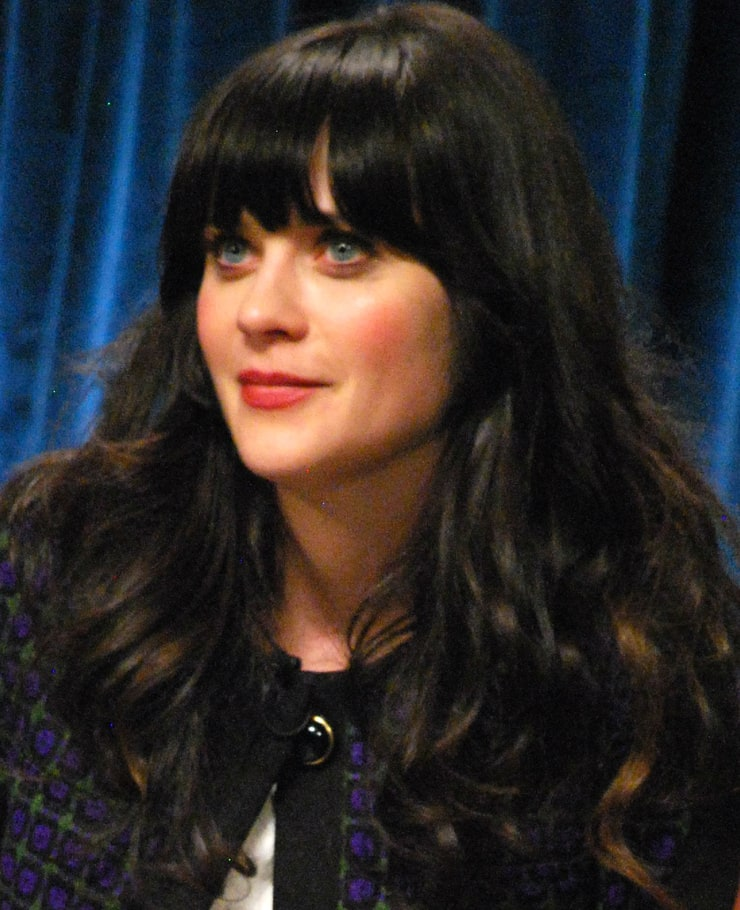
Zooey Deschanel portrays Jessica Day

Jessica Christopher Day (Zooey Deschanel) is introduced as a bubbly, offbeat teacher in her early thirties who is originally from Portland, Oregon. After the shocking discovery in the pilot episode that her live-in boyfriend, Spencer, is cheating on her, she moves into the guys' apartment where Nick, Schmidt, and Winston (or Coach in the Pilot episode) help her move on from her break-up, with the help of her childhood friend, Cece, a semi-successful model. From there, Jess embarks on a journey of self-discovery and growth as she navigates through a series of relationships and jobs.

During season 1, Jess casually dated, the most memorable of those men being her music teacher co-worker Paul Genzlinger (Justin Long) and Russell Schiller (Dermot Mulroney), a divorced father of one of her students. In Season 2 of New Girl, Jess gets laid off from her teaching job and takes up part-time work while searching for a new teaching position. She ends up teaching creative writing in adult education. At first, she's not looking for anything serious and hooks up with Sam Sweeney (David Walton), who prefers open relationships. But things change when she discovers Sam is a successful pediatrician with a good heart, and she starts wanting something more serious. Eventually they begin dating, but their relationship is short-lived; in the episode "Cooler", she and Nick share a spontaneous kiss during a game of True American. Towards the end of Season 2, Jess lands a job as a substitute teacher at Coolidge Middle School. Eventually, she and Nick have sex in the episode "Virgins". They finally decide to become a couple in the Season 2 finale. In Season 3, She and Nick continue their relationship, but their life goals differ too much, and they spend more time arguing. They break up in the Season 3 episode "Mars Landing". In Season 4, she gets promoted to Vice Principal, but the job gets complicated when she starts dating a new science teacher named Ryan, and they face challenges due to a school policy against administrator-teacher relationships. They attempt a long-distance relationship when he moves home to England, but eventually break up. In Season 5, she starts dating Sam again. Towards the end of the season, Sam breaks up with Jess because he is in love with a friend from medical school, and he leads Jess to realize she still is navigating her feelings for Nick. In Season 6, Jess joins a singles group and begins dating Cece's ex, Robby, to avoid her feelings for Nick, who is dating former on-again/off-again roommate Reagan (Megan Fox). However, in the episode "The Hike", she and Robby learn that they share relatives in Massachusetts. They realize they are third cousins and end their relationship. Jess is promoted to principal. At the end of the season, she and Nick get back together after he breaks up with Reagan.

In the Season 7 premiere, Jess and Nick return to the loft after Nick's book tour. They are still not engaged or married. Jess takes a job with Russell's education foundation, and is discouraged by the fact that Nick has not proposed. On the night they were supposed to adopt a dog, Nick proposes to Jess, and she accepts. Jess and Nick decide to move to a smaller apartment. But before they leave the loft, they gather everyone for a special farewell. They play one final game of "True American," and during the game there's a glimpse into the future, where it's revealed that Jess and Nick will eventually become parents to a son.

=== Nick Miller ===
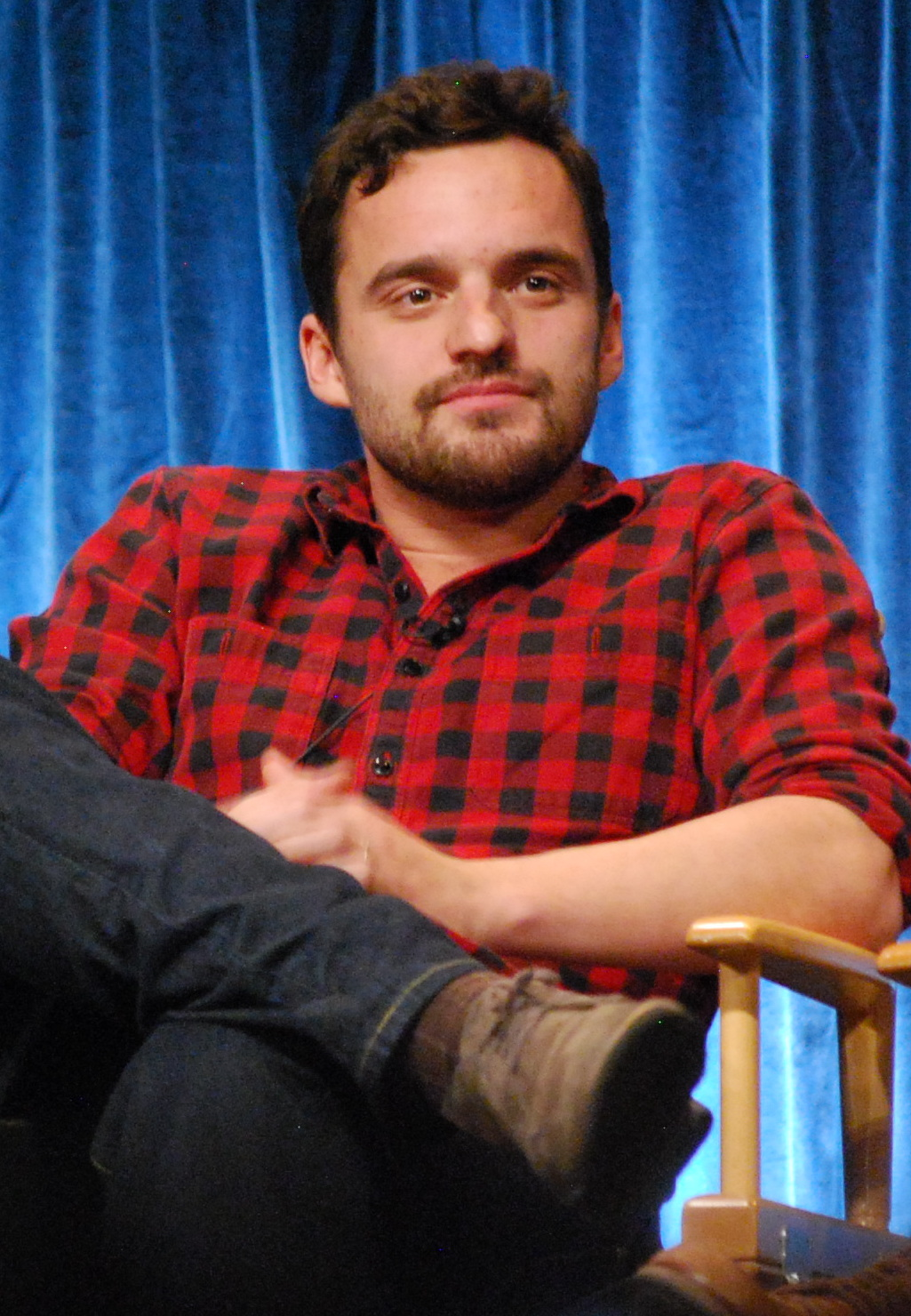
Jake Johnson portrays Nick Miller

Nicholas Sean "Nick" Miller (Jake Johnson), who is based on a person Meriwether knew from college, is one of Jess' roommates who works as a bartender. He and Winston are childhood friends. He and Schmidt shared a dorm room together at the Syracuse University and became life-long friends. It is implied by Schmidt that he dropped out of law school. At the start of the series, he struggles from having broken up with his long-term girlfriend Caroline. At a wedding event, he almost reunites with her. In the episode "Bells", it is revealed that he is fairly frugal and prefers to repair things in the apartment by himself rather than hire outside help. Out of everyone at the loft he is the worst with money, keeping all of his cash in a box and has never paid taxes, although ironically he is the most financially successful member of his family. Later on, in the episode "Clavado En Un Bar", it is revealed that he took and passed the California bar exam to prove he could do it, but decided he'd rather be a bartender instead. In the episode "Secrets", it is shown he is not good at keeping secrets, and sweats on his lower back. He is also not good with taking care of plants. He is laid back, messy, and avoidant of his feelings. He frequently seeks out advice from Tran, an elderly man he meets in a public park.

In season 1, he initially is hesitant about having a female roommate; however, he eventually develops a genuine friendship with Jess and is immediately supportive of her when she is treated poorly by people or goes through emotional turmoil. He dates Julia, a lawyer. He briefly has a cancer scare, and also develops a platonic infatuation with Jess' older boyfriend, Russell. Nick tries to rekindle his romance with Caroline and almost moves in with her at the end of season 1. They break up, and Nick returns to the loft.

In season 2, he writes a zombie novel called Z Is for Zombie He begins dating a stripper named Angie, and reunites with his father. He and Jess become attracted to each other and they kiss in the season 2 episode "Cooler," despite the fact that Jess is dating Dr Sam. Afterward, he and Jess are confused as to how to deal with their relationship, but later have sex in the episode "Virgins". Nick's father passes away, and he and Jess later decide to date.

In season 3, Nick tells Jess he loves her. Caroline is suspicious Nick cheated on her with Jess, and Nick tells her that he fell for Jess the first time he saw her. Jess and Nick briefly live in his room together, and Nick also represents Schmidt in a civil suit. Nick and Jess break up after an argument about how they see their futures. They later go on a couples' cruise together with Cece, Schmidt, Winston, and Coach.

In season 4, he trains Cece to bartend. He begins dating Tran's granddaughter, Kai (Greta Lee) who eventually breaks up with him. He and Schmidt revive their business ventures, eventually investing in a share of the bar where he works.

In season 5, while Jess is sequestered on jury duty, Nick convinces the beautiful pharmaceutical rep Reagan Lucas to move in and flirts with her, but only get as far as kissing before she leaves. They start dating at the end of season 5, and Nick briefly moves to New Orleans with her. At the beginning of season 6, he returns from New Orleans and works on his novel The Pepperwood Chronicles while maintaining a long-distance, and later in-loft, relationship with Reagan. However, at the end of season 6 he and Reagan break up after Nick realizes he's ready for a mature, emotionally vulnerable relationship, and he reunites with Jess.

Three years later, in the season 7 premiere, Nick and Jess return to the loft after a European book tour for Pepperwood, although he is still waiting for the right time to propose to Jess. He eventually proposes to her in the episode "Mario", and they marry in the episode The Curse of the Pirate Bride". In the series finale, he and Jess move out of the loft to a two-bedroom apartment. A flash-forward reveals that he and Jess have a son in the future.

=== Schmidt ===
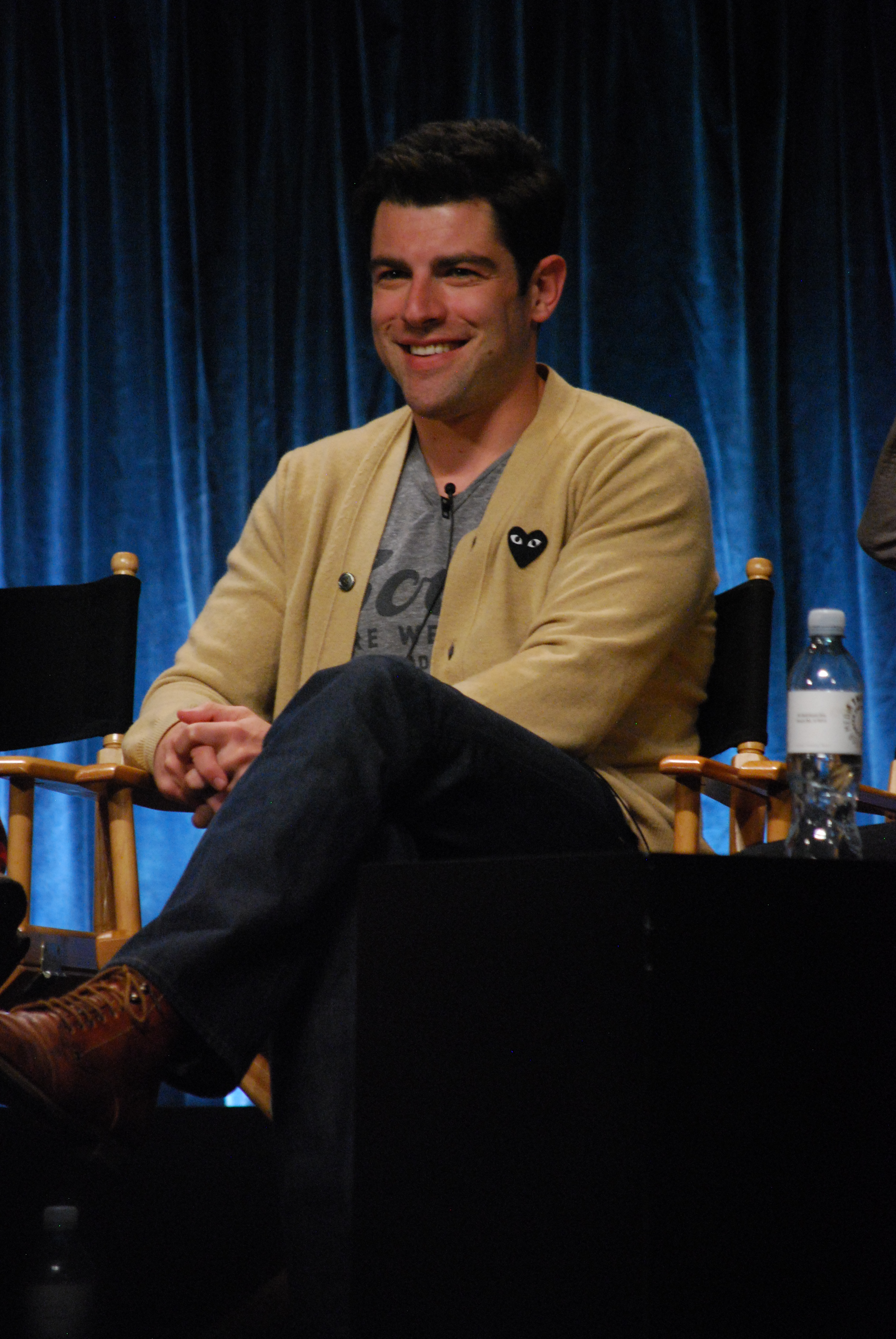
Max Greenfield portrays Schmidt

Schmidt (Max Greenfield), is one of Jess' new roommates and later Cece's husband. He is an overly confident ladies' man who is originally from Long Island, New York. While attending Syracuse University, he was very obese, and shared a dorm room with Nick and became life-long friends. He has OCD. Since college, he has worked hard to lose weight and to be seen as physically attractive and cool. Because of this, he often says offensive or cocky things, and every time he does, his roommates make him put money in the apartment's "douchebag jar". He is relatively wealthy compared to his roommates, having bought the couch and refrigerator, and splurging on things such as an $80 sushi plate; it was also noted that his family spent $40,000 on his Bar Mitzvah. Schmidt is a successful marketing associate, the sole male in a female-dominated office, and is known for his numerous flings with women. Schmidt's other quirks include a fear of feral cats, especially the one on their apartment's roof; being very controlling and a germophobe when it comes to preparing food; and organizing the loft.

Schmidt meets Cece through Jess, and is immediately smitten. They begin a secret sexual relationship in the second half of season 1. In the season finale, he ends his relationship with Cece because he feels she deserves someone better. In season 2, he continues to have feelings for Cece, but she has moved on to date someone else. He has a brief relationship with a co-worker Emma who has him sign a sex contract, but later ends things. He rekindles his relationship with his college girlfriend Elizabeth (Merritt Wever) in an attempt to move on from Cece, who is now engaged. In season 3, he tries to date both Elizabeth and Cece but he ends up losing both of them. He moves into neighboring apartment 4C, allowing for Coach to return as a roommate, but later moves back to 4D (sharing a room with Nick) after he uses his savings to fund a storefront for Jess' sister Abby (Linda Cardellini), whom he also briefly dates. He gives his blessing to Coach, who wants to date Cece. In season 4, he dates councilwoman Fawn Moscato, who uses him as a prop. In the season 4 finale "Clean Break", he realizes he cannot part ways with Cece; he proposes to her. Leading up to the wedding, Schmidt tries to repair his relationship with his father Gavin (Peter Gallagher), while also trying to convince Cece's mother he is worthy of marrying her. They marry at the end of season 5.

In season 6, they purchase a fixer-upper house, and have it renovated. Towards the end of season 6, he is promoted to director of marketing, and in the final episode, he learns that Cece is expecting their first child. In the season 7 premiere, it is revealed that Schmidt has become a stay-at-home dad to their three-year-old daughter Ruth. In the series finale, a flash-forward reveals that he and Cece have a son named Moses.

Schmidt's first name is a long-kept secret of the series, until the penultimate episode of season 6 "San Diego" in which it is revealed to be Winston and his middle name is Saint-Marie. He agreed with Winston Bishop to be called by his last name to avoid confusion.

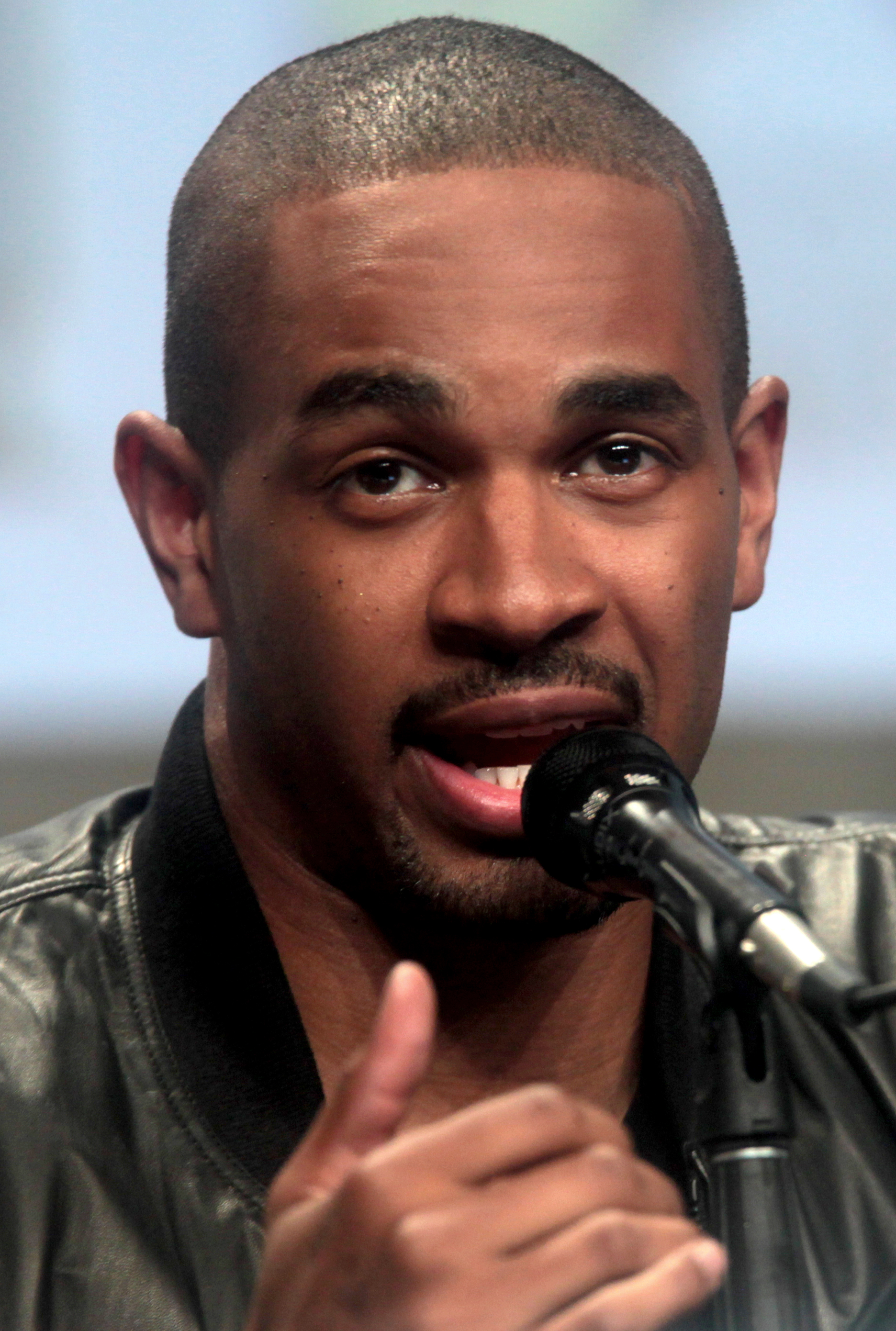
Damon Wayans Jr. portrays Coach

=== Coach ===
Ernie Tagliaboo (Damon Wayans Jr.) who goes by the nickname Coach, is a cocky and driven, yet sometimes awkward and often sensitive former athlete. He is one of the roommates when Jess first moves into the loft in the pilot, but he moves out before the second episode to move in with an unseen girlfriend, allowing for Winston (a former roommate) to take his place.

In season 3, Coach moves back in with the gang in the loft after having been dumped by his girlfriend, initially working as a personal trainer. He has limited interest in a friendship with Jess, but eventually gets a job at her school as a gym coach and health teacher, and they develop a close friendship. He briefly dates Cece, but they realize they are better off as friends. He continues to date on and off and not have any serious relationships.

In the episode "Bar Crawl", he meets fellow army brat May, a professional cellist, for the first time; continuously bumping into each other throughout the night at different bars, they soon discover that they were constantly missing each other by a year or two while traveling the country growing up, and begin dating. At the end of season 4, Coach moves to New York with May after she gets an opportunity to work at the Metropolitan Opera. He makes guest appearances afterwards in seasons 5–7, and is often mentioned. In the episode "Cece's Boys", it is revealed that he and May moved to North Carolina and have taken in a foreign exchange student named Montsie.

=== Cece Parikh ===
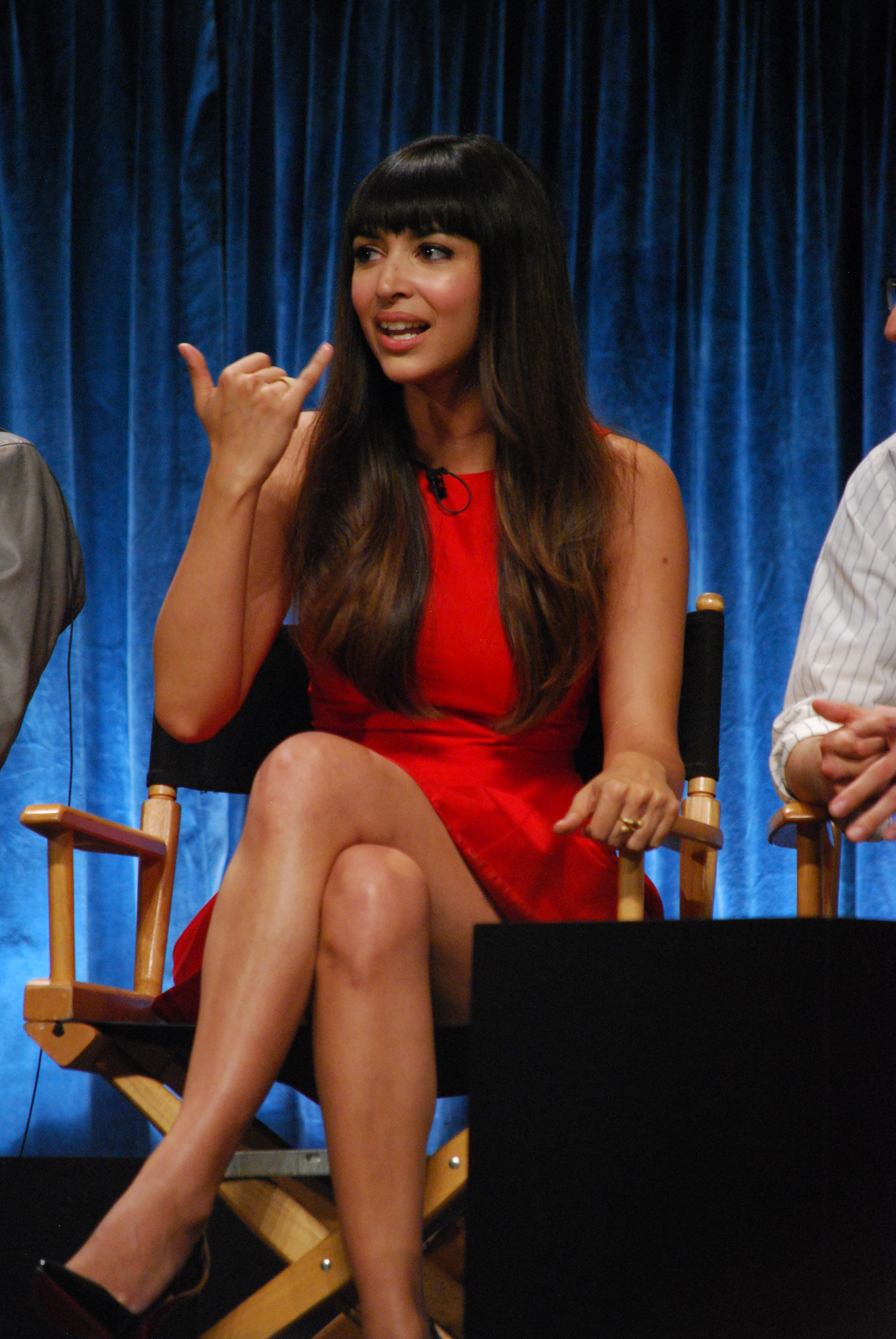
Hannah Simone portrays Cece

Cecilia "Cece" Parikh (Note: Cece's last name has been spelled Parikh and Parekh. The season 5 episode "D-Day" shows an invitation where Cece's last name is spelled Parikh. For the season 2 episode "Table 34" the captions spell her name Parikh. It was spelled Parekh in the season 4 finale "Clean Break" and some captions early in season 5. It is also spelled Parekh in the Fox profiles.) (Hannah Simone) is Jess' best friend since childhood, a street-smart and snarky fashion model. Although she is fairly responsible and cool, she does enjoy parties and frequently dates unserious men. Her parents were born in India. Not much is known about Cece's childhood outside of her father dying shortly before she and Jess met. She struggled in school and Jess tutored her. For much of the series, she lives in an apartment with several other models, including the deadpan Russian model Nadia. She and Nick frequently butt heads, but she is very close to Winston and Coach.

Initially skeptical of Jess' new roommates, Cece and Schmidt share an intimate moment when he comforts her after a breakup. She becomes romantically interested in Schmidt while preparing Thanksgiving dinner. They have a passionate sexual relationship and try to keep it a secret from the others until they are discovered by Winston. Schmidt breaks up with her at the end of season 1, and she retains feelings towards him.

In season 2, Cece begins dating Robby. She later discovers that she has limited time to conceive a baby and decides to enter an arranged marriage with a man named Shivrang. She calls off the wedding in the season 2 finale after realizing that she is still in love with Schmidt and has no feelings for Shivrang (who also turned out to be in love with someone else). At the start of season 3, a confused Schmidt misleads her as he attempts to carry on two distinct relationships Schmidt reveals he is dating her and Elizabeth, and both women break up with him. During season 3, Cece and Coach briefly date, much to Schmidt's dismay, but decide to remain friends.

Cece starts working part-time as a bartender at Nick's bar, passes her GED exam and begins taking community college classes. While Schmidt is dating Fawn Moscato, Cece begins to have feelings for him again. She goes on a hiking trip to Mount Shasta, and when she returns she accepts his marriage proposal in the season 4 finale "Clean Break". Cece is nervous to tell her mother she is engaged to Schmidt, as he is not Indian. Her mother refuses to give her blessing, so Schmidt spends the time leading up to their wedding convincing her, and is successful. Cece also encourages Schmidt to repair his relationship with his estranged father Gavin.

Schmidt and Cece get married in the season 5 finale "Landing Gear", and buy a house, which they fix up in season 6. In addition to bartending, she opens up a modeling agency called Cece's Boys in season 6. In the final episode, "Five Stars for Beezus", Cece learns she is pregnant. Three years later, in season 7, she and Schmidt have a three-year-old daughter named Ruth, and her modeling agency was merged into a larger agency. In the series finale, a flash-forward reveals that she and Schmidt eventually have a son named Moses.

=== Winston Bishop ===
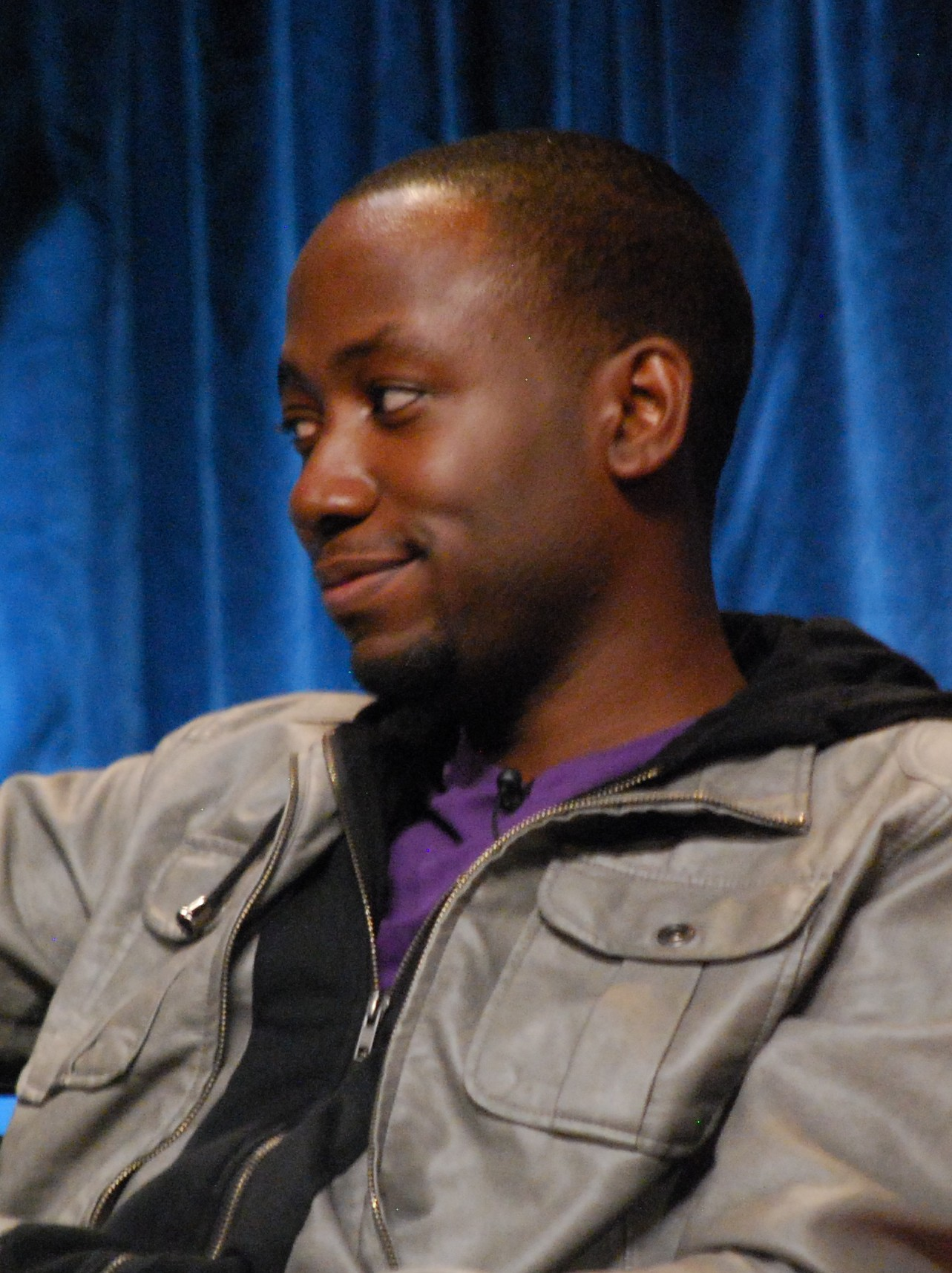
Lamorne Morris portrays Winston Bishop

Winston L'Andre Bishop (Lamorne Morris), is Nick's childhood friend from Chicago and one of the loft's original occupants. He first appears in "Kryptonite", where he returns to the loft to replace Coach, after returning from a career as a point guard in the Latvian Basketball League. Upon his return to the States, he struggles to find work and find a healthy relationship. He enjoys pulling pranks on people, but the jokes are either too small or too big, which makes his friends despise them. He also enjoys jigsaw puzzles and wearing shirts with pictures of birds or other animals on them, despite being color blind.

Winston's father left his family when he was a baby. He played college basketball at Rutgers University. He has a sister who also plays professional basketball.

After dabbling in some odd jobs, including being a nanny for Schmidt's boss Gina's son, he gets his break as a research assistant to a sports radio show host, which leads to his own show on the radio's late night shift. He dates Shelby, who he had treated neglectfully in the past. In the season 1 finale, it is revealed he his afraid of the dark, although after spending a night in the desert, he seems to get over it.

In season 2, he breaks up with Shelby in the Halloween episode. He later dates Daisy (Brenda Song). Despite wanting to be exclusive with her, she continues to see other men, so Winston breaks up with her and he takes ownership of her cat, Furguson. He later dates a bus driver named Bertie. In season 5, he dates Rhonda (Sonequa Martin-Green), a soldier, who engages in pranks with Winston; they marry, for a prank, before she is immediately deployed overseas.

Having realized that others have been making his career choices for him all his life, he quits his radio host job, enrolls in a police academy, and becomes a police officer for the LAPD. He is partnered with the tough, but kind-hearted colleague, Aly Nelson (Nasim Pedrad). They start dating in season 5, and he proposes to her in season 6. Three years later, he and Aly are married and are expecting a child, living on their own. In an attempt of good faith, Aly believes she has tracked down Winston's father, but Winston ultimately decides he does not need him in his life. In the episode "Curse of the Pirate Bride", Aly gives birth to a baby boy whom Winston names DanBill Bishop, and in the series finale flash-forward scene, they have five children.

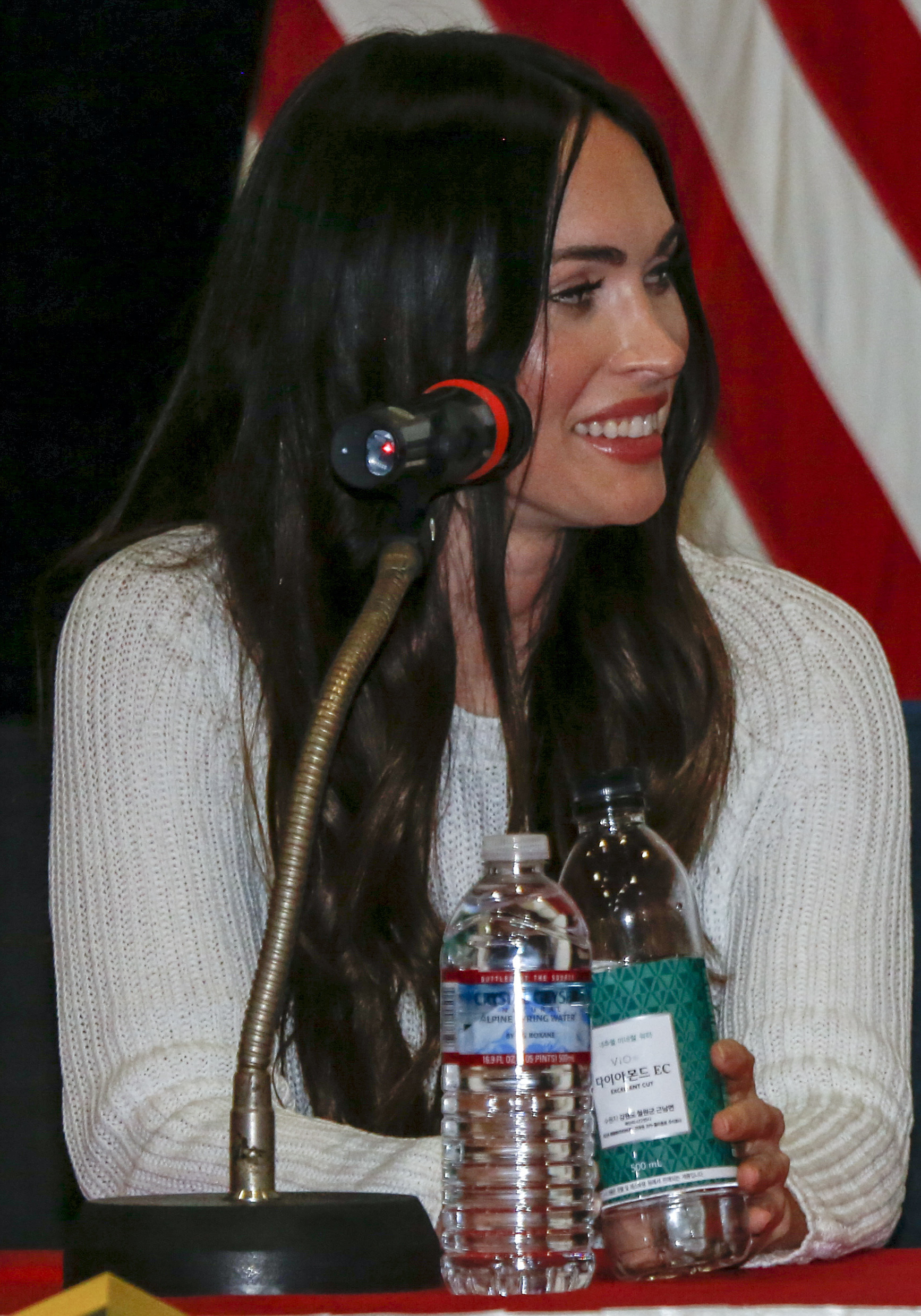
Megan Fox portrays Reagan Lucas

=== Ruth Parikh-Schmidt ===
Ruth Bader Parikh-Schmidt (Danielle Rockoff and Rhiannon Rockoff) is Schmidt and Cece's daughter, first appearing in season 7 where she celebrates her third birthday. Showrunner Brett Baer said that they chose to name her after U.S. Supreme Court Justice Ruth Bader Ginsburg because of Schmidt's character growth and change from someone who often objectified women to someone who admired strong women and wants his daughter to become President of the United States someday. Ruth is smart and enjoys a routine. She spends much of her time with her father and has a comical relationship with Nick.

== Secondary characters ==
=== Introduced in season 1 ===
- Caroline (Mary Elizabeth Ellis), Nick's ex-girlfriend at the start of the series. She and Nick briefly rekindle their relationship, nearly moving in together.
- Paul Genzlinger (Justin Long), a music teacher at Jess' school whom Jess takes a liking to. The guys remark that he is quirky and emotional like a male version of Jess. They break up and he later becomes engaged to Jenn, who Jess thinks is like an Asian version of her. In a season 4 episode "Walk of Shame", it was revealed that he and Jenn had broken up, and that he had been working as a clown entertainer for kids' birthday parties, but Jess convinces him to quit that and move forward with his life.
- Gina (Michaela Watkins), Schmidt's boss and the Vice President at Associated Strategies. She is described as "tough, domineering, unpleasant". She has a baby shower in season 1 which Schmidt gets himself invited to. She has a son named Elvin whom Winston befriends at the holiday Christmas party, and whom Winston watches over as a nanny prior to his radio show job.
- Sadie (June Diane Raphael), Jess and Cece's friend and gynecologist. She is a lesbian. She is pregnant in the second season. Her partner is Melissa, who is played by series writer Kay Cannon.
- Kim (Gillian Vigman), Schmidt's other boss and the CFO at Associated Strategies. She frequently speaks in double entendres to Schmidt.
- Benjamin (David Neher), Schmidt's former college roommate and "fremesis". He is posh and snobby, and frequently belittles Schmdit.
- Tanya Lamontagne (Rachael Harris), the vice principal at Jess' school in season 1. She joins Jess on the party bus.
- Remy (Jeff Kober), the loft building's creepy landlord. When Jess befriends him, he assumes she wants to flirt with him.
- Julia Cleary (Lizzy Caplan), Nick's girlfriend in a story arc in season 1. At first she appears to be the perfect girl to Nick, but later it is revealed she has severe anger management issues. She is a lawyer who has a contrasting personality to the bubbly Jess.
- Shelby (Kali Hawk), Winston's love interest. They had a tryst before Winston went to Latvia, but after much apologizing on Winston's part, she agreed to give him a second chance. She manages a diner.
- Russell Schiller (Dermot Mulroney), a wealthy single father whose daughter is in Jess' class. He first appears in the episodes "Fancyman." He dislikes that his daughter did a weird art project and wanted to pull her out of Jess' class. Jess' boss reveals that Russell was the third largest donor in the city, and the episodes show that he has a fancy car and house, but that he is very generous and kind to Jess because he likes her. Mulroney described his role as being a person half-generation older, but that he had a blast working with the group. Mulroney's role was initially for three episodes but was extended to a fourth episode and also included guest star Jeanne Tripplehorn who played Russell's ex-wife. In the season 7 premiere, Russell says that he had remarried and divorced twice in the three years since Jess and Nick got back together, and has a toddler that is in the same gym class as Ruth. He hires Jess to work at his education-based non-profit but ultimately tries to ruin her and Nick's wedding.
- Joe Napoli (Phil Hendrie), a sports radio personality who hires Winston as his research assistant. Hendrie himself is a radio personality.
- Nadia (Rebecca Reid), a Russian model and one of Cece's roommates. On Cece's prompting, she and Schmidt have a date, but it results in an awkward sexual encounter, in which Schmidt injures his penis and has to be hospitalized. Reid auditioned when the show was looking for fashion models that would serve as "intimidatingly taciturn roommates for Cece", and that the character was originally going to just say five words but her role got extended to ten episodes. Reid said that she had met Russian models who acted like that. In the season 4 episode "Girl Fight", she has a baby shower.

=== Introduced in season 2 ===
- Robby McFerrin (Nelson Franklin), Cece's new boyfriend in the season premiere. Laid-back and nice, he represents a contrast to Schmidt, who sees him as a rival, but later tries to ally with him against Shivrang. In season 6, he and Jess form a singles group dedicated to keeping their relationships platonic. He and Jess develop feelings for each other; however, during the episode "The Hike", they discover they are third cousins and break up. While dating Jess, he severely injures much of his body in a gym accident. It is also revealed he is quite wealthy, played on a Santana album in high school, designs factories, has a documentary about him, and owns a boat.
- Sam Sweeney (David Walton), Jess' love interest after she was laid off from teaching. Jess had planned to have just a physical relationship with someone who was just as disinterested as her at the time. He likes Creed. He is revealed to be a pediatrician, and he and Jess continue to date on and off.
- Bearclaw (Josh Gad), a beer delivery guy at the bar where Nick works. He initially takes an interest in Jess, causing Nick to accidentally set them up on a date. He is extremely awkward, odd, and dramatic. They meet again in the season 4 episode "Walk of Shame".
- Tran (Ralph Ahn), an elderly, possibly homeless, Asian man whom Nick befriends in the park. Tran (which is never confirmed to be his real name, but merely a name Nick invents in order to call him something) only speaks twice throughout the series, but his facial reactions are interpreted by Nick as either sage advice or cheeky jokes, and he often turns to Tran when things go wrong in his life. The character was thought up by Johnson, and Meriweather and the writers thought he was funny and really easy to write for. At one point Nick dates Tran's granddaughter, Kai, to whom he confesses that Tran is his (Nick's) best friend (though she replies that Nick is not Tran's best friend).
- Emma (Carla Gugino) is the Vice President of the North American region of Associated Strategies. She and Schmidt have a brief sexual relationship that was prefaced with Schmidt signing a legal sex contract. Gugino described her character as like Fifty Shades of Grey but more comical.
- Joan Day (Jamie Lee Curtis) is Jess' mother. She and Bob are divorced and she shares some personality quirks with Jess.
- Bob Day (Rob Reiner) is Jess' father. Though he admits to having many similarities to Nick, he is very protective of Jess and disapproves of their relationship. In season 4, he proposes marriage to Ashley, one of Jess' former schoolmates, and marries her in the episode "Oregon", but is divorced again in season 6.
- Big Schmidt (Rob Riggle), Schmidt's rival cousin, first showing at Thanksgiving. He returns in season 5 for the bachelor party festivities.
- Angie (Olivia Munn), a bar patron that Nick falls for as she broke up with a boyfriend. She works as a stripper, but Jess encourages Nick to be with her. When asked about Angie and Nick's abrupt breakup, Munn said that it was more of a practical setting so that she could return to filming episodes for The Newsroom and that she liked seeing Nick and Jess together.
- Walt Miller (Dennis Farina), Nick's dad. He is a con man. During his visit in season 2, he tries to get Jess to invest in a race horse and sell it for stud services. The gang later go to Chicago for his funeral, and he appears in a flashback episode afterwards. Farina died several months after his appearances were broadcast on New Girl.
- Shivrang (Satya Bhabha), Cece's fiance by arranged marriage.
- Daisy (Brenda Song), Winston's love interest. She initially appeared at the bar wearing an engagement ring but that was to fend off guys. She tries to teach Winston to be more confident in picking up girls. Because of their schedules they only have a small window of time to interact. She is described as competitive and intense and disliking quitters. Although they part ways in season 3, Winston takes ownership of Daisy's cat Furguson.
- Outside Dave (Steve Agee), a homeless man who lives outside of the apartment building and often interacts with Jess and the roommates.
- Elizabeth (Merritt Wever), Schmidt's college girlfriend.
- Principal Foster (Curtis Armstrong), the eccentric principal of Coolidge Middle School. Despite his apparent incompetence and frequent oddness, he and Jess have a congenial relationship. His given name is Alan. Although he retires in season 5, he is still named Principal Foster for appearances in season 6 and 7.

=== Introduced in season 3 ===
- Rose (Angela Kinsey), a "snobbish "cool" teacher" at Coolidge Middle School. She is described as "turned off by Jess' diligence and goody-two-shoes approach to her job."
- Lorenzo (Brian Posehn), credited as Biology Teacher, works at Coolidge Middle School.
- Bertie (Jessica Chaffin) is a bus driver who becomes Winston's girlfriend when she found Winston's cat. Winston likes that she's down-to-earth.
- Mike (Ben Falcone), the gay owner of the bar where Nick and Cece work.
- Abby Day (Linda Cardellini), Jess' older sister, described as bit of a wild child. She is frequently in trouble with the law. The writers also used Cardellini as a character reference.

=== Introduced in season 4 ===
- Ryan Geauxinue (Julian Morris) an attractive new science teacher from the United Kingdom who becomes Jess' love interest, although Jess struggles with entering the relationship because of her position as a vice-principal and the school policy of not having relationships with teachers. In the episode "Landline", the gang are confused as to how to pronounce his name, thinking it sounds more like "goes in you".
- Kai (Greta Lee), Tran's granddaughter who becomes Nick's girlfriend. Winston, observing Kai's slovenly lifestyle, worries that Kai is looking for a sugar daddy, but Nick discovers that she is actually rich and works her own hours as a consultant. She enjoys staying on the couch with Nick, and eventually breaks up with him when he becomes, in her mind, too assertive in his career ambitions (much to the amusement of the rest of the gang).
- Fawn Moscato (Zoe Lister-Jones), a city councilwoman who becomes Schmidt's love interest. She is described as controlling and manipulative, using Schmidt mostly as a model boyfriend to advance her causes. In the series finale, she has become mayor.
- Aly Nelson (Nasim Pedrad). Introduced as Winston's no-nonsense training partner when he joins the LAPD, her petite stature initially makes Nick and Coach worried that she cannot defend herself or Winston. At first, she does not want to be friends with Winston, as her former partner had fallen for her and it did not work out. They become a couple in season 5 and get engaged in season 6. In the season 7 premiere, she and Winston are married and she is pregnant; in the penultimate episode, she gives birth to a baby boy whom Winston names Dan Bill Bishop, and in the series finale flash-forward scene, she and Winston have five children.
- May (Meaghan Rath), a girl that Coach keeps running into at the Valentine's Day bar crawl. She agrees to be Coach's girlfriend on the condition that he write her a nice e-mail, but when Coach accidentally sends off a number of rough drafts, she accepts him anyway. She plays the cello in a chamber ensemble, but is accepting of Coach's quirks and flaws as well as his interests, playing "Heavy Action" (the theme for Monday Night Football) for him. When she accepts a job in New York, she and Coach are about to break up but they both have second thoughts, and Coach agrees to move with her.
- Louise Schmidt (Nora Dunn), Schmidt's mother. (Note: Barbara Kerford played Schmidt's mom in a flashback scene for Season 1 episode "Naked") She is very strict and insists that Schmidt do all his bar mitzvah thank-you cards before granting him the money, and nitpicks his manners. She later proposes marriage to her long-time partner Susan toward the end of season 5.

=== Introduced in season 5 ===
- J. Cronkite Valley-Forge (Fred Melamed), the CFO at Associated Strategies around the time when Schmidt is engaged.
- Reagan (Megan Fox), a no-nonsense pharmaceutical sales rep. Nick convinces her to sublet Jess' room during Jess' jury duty, which the show used as a cover for Zooey Deschanel's maternity leave. Reagan travels frequently and does not want to have committed relationships, platonic or romantic. She and Cece knew each other from an MTV show, and they had a sexual relationship years prior. Although she enjoys sex with men and women, she has never had a real relationship. When she is first introduced, she seeks Winston's help in officially breaking off her on-and-off relationship with a woman named Camilla (Clea DuVall). Despite her iciness, the loft residents are eager to befriend her; she even becomes close with Jess, who returns from jury duty shortly before Reagan leaves. Reagan and Nick begin dating during her stint in the loft, and continue to do so after she moves to Seattle. They briefly move to New Orleans together, but he returns alone. Her relationship with Nick is complicated due to their mutual inability to express emotion or talk through issues. They eventually break up at the end of Season 6 after Nick admits to wanting more.
- Gavin Schmidt (Peter Gallagher), Schmidt's father. He is divorced, but made out with Jess in his introductory episode. He owns a vineyard. Nick and Schmidt do not trust him at first because he has been unreliable as a father to Schmidt, but he resolves to do better as a father after Nick tells him to clean up his act. In season 6, he gets in trouble when he dates six women at once.

=== Introduced in season 6 ===
- Leslie Nelson (Ayden Mayeri), Aly's ditzy sister who is introduced when she is trying to become a realtor. Her process for finding Schmidt and Cece a home involves simply Googling "houses", which is not successful. When they fire her, Winston tries to soften the blow by hiring her himself, and she responds by trying to sell him a boat.
- Donovan (Trent Garrett), a hunky but air-headed bartender Cece hires when Nick promotes her to manager. He later becomes Cece's first client for her modeling agency, Cece's Boys, though his immature attitude causes her problems when she tries to bring in new talent.
- Merle Streep (Brian Huskey), Nick's publisher and editor. Merle runs a young adult publishing company and takes on Nick as a client, catapulting Nick's Pepperwood Chronicles to international success. Their relationship is often fractious, with Nick repeatedly shooting down Merle's plot suggestions, and eventually ends when Merle terminates Pepperwood and rejects Nick's followup manuscript, Chicago Hobo.

== Special guest stars ==
- Taylor Swift as Elaine (season 2 episode "Elaine's Big Day"): Shivrang's love interest for whom Shivrang leaves Cece during their wedding.
- Prince as himself (season 3 episode "Prince"): hosts a party the characters attend and provides relationship advice for Nick and Jess.
- Kareem Abdul-Jabbar as himself (season 1 episode "Normal"): works with Winston and shares a cubicle wall with him.
- apl.de.ap as himself (season 5 episode "No Girl"): briefly appears during a flashback at Nick and Schmidt's college dorm room.
- Gordon Ramsay as himself (season 6 episode "Operation: Bobcat"): cooks a private meal for Jess at the loft on Valentine's Day.
