= Jessica Day (New Girl) =

Jess Day
- New Girl character
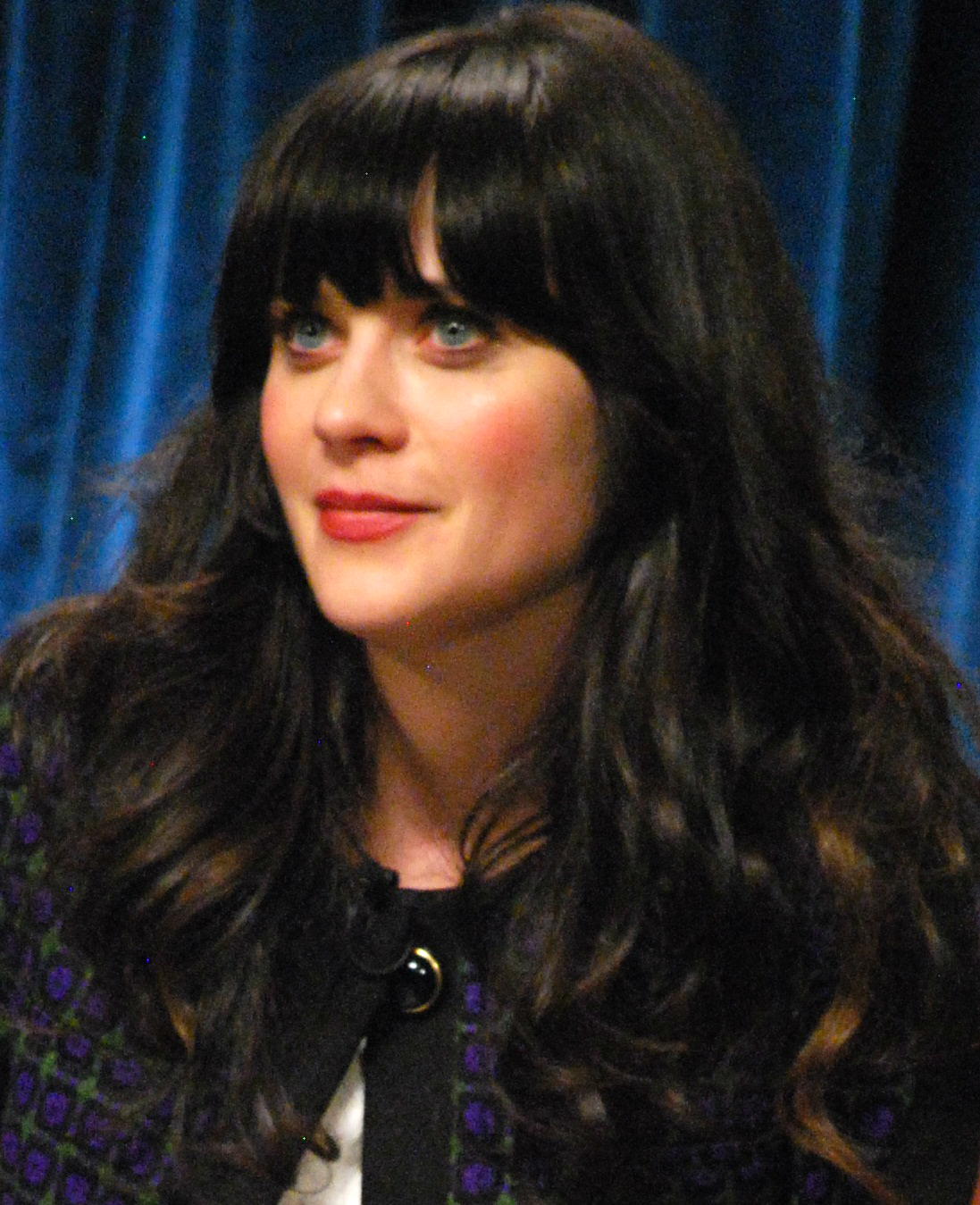
- Zooey Deschanel at PaleyFest's New Girl panel in 2012
- First appearance: "Pilot" (2011)
- Last appearance: "Engram Pattersky" (2018)
- Portrayed by: Zooey Deschanel

In-universe information
- Full name: Jessica Christopher Day
- Nickname: Jess
- Occupation: School teacher; Vice-principal; Principal
- Family: Joan Day (mother); Bob Day (father); Abby Day (sister)
- Significant others: Nick Miller (Husband); Paul Genzlinger (Ex-Boyfriend); Russell (Ex-Boyfriend); Sam Sweeney (Ex-Boyfriend); Ryan Geauxinue (Ex-Boyfriend); Robby McFerrin (Ex-Boyfriend)
- Date of birth: 21 January 1982

Jessica Christopher Day is a fictional title character in the FOX sitcom New Girl, where she becomes the sole female roommate in an apartment loft in Los Angeles. She is portrayed by Zooey Deschanel.

== Conception and development ==
Film actress and singer-songwriter Zooey Deschanel was in the process of developing an HBO show when she read the New Girl pilot script and responded to the material. The character of Jess was not specifically written for Deschanel, but the producers found it a great match and did not need a lot of fine-tuning. With the support from Fox, creator Liz Meriwether wanted to make Jess a unique, interesting and funny female character that would have been the side character on other shows. Deschanel became a producer on the show and helped build the character, requesting to not play the classic wife character who would be ignored by the guys she tries to keep out of trouble. Meriwether's goal was to write about herself from an honest perspective, with Jess mirroring her at the start and later Deschanel until Jess turned into a "hybrid of me and Zooey, the writers, and the editor". Deschanel described Jess as a part of her, especially in regards to "the sort of enthusiasm and optimism" of her youth. She does not shy away from playing embarrassing scenes or being unattractive, and Jake Kasdan, one of a number of directors, said that "This show advocates for the attractive dork." Although Meriwether had always imagined the show as an ensemble show, Fox would later focus its first marketing push on Deschanel and gave the show the promotional tagline "Simply Adorkable."

Speaking of the show Zooey Deschanel claimed that her character in New Girl resembles a younger version of herself. She said "I think Jess as a person, and the way that her personality is, has some of myself and especially some of my younger self," she suggested. "[She resembles] my 13-year-old self." Deschanel added that Jess will explore her lost youth after she is dumped by her long-term boyfriend. "I have to find a new support system, so I'm basically living my 20s as I approach my 30s," she explained.

== Character storyline ==
Jess grew up in Portland, Oregon. Her parents, Bob (Rob Reiner) and Joan (Jamie Lee Curtis), are divorced, and she has an older sister named Abby (Linda Cardellini). Her best friend, Cece (Hannah Simone) moved to Los Angeles in their late teens/early twenties. Five or so years later, after Jess finished college and left her first teaching job in Portland, Jess follows her friend and got a teaching job in LA. She dated Spencer (Ian Wolterstorff), her boyfriend of six years, but discovered he had been cheating on her and left him. She answers an ad on Craigslist and moves into a loft she shares with Nick Miller (Jake Johnson), Coach (Damon Wayans Jr.), and Schmidt (Max Greenfield). After Coach moves out of the loft, she shares the loft with Winston Bishop (Lamorne Morris) along with the others. She mentions that since the breakup, she would be watching Dirty Dancing on video repeatedly. She exhibits several quirks such as breaking into song or doing random impressions of television characters. She works as a sixth grade teacher, covering multiple subjects from science and art to sex education. She also plays guitar and writes songs, as shown in the episode "Bully". During season 1, she dates several different men, including: music teacher co-worker Paul Genzlinger (Justin Long), whom her roommates think is a male version of Jess; and Russell Schiller (Dermot Mulroney), a divorced father of one of her students.

At the start of season 2, she is laid off from her school job. She hooks up with a guy named Sam Sweeney (David Walton) who prefers an open relationship and is later revealed to be a pediatrician. After trying some random part-time jobs such as a food server for a casserole shop, she gets a job in adult education, where she teaches creative writing. Midway through the season, she reunites with Sam, before she and Nick spontaneously kiss in the episode "Cooler". Towards the end of season 2 she lands a job as a substitute teacher at Coolidge Middle School. She and Nick eventually have sex in "Virgins". After several episodes where they try to figure out what their relationship is, they agree to become a couple in the season 2 finale.

In season 3, Jess continues her relationship with Nick, but after a tumultuous visit from Abby, she and Nick realize their life goals diverge too much and they have spent more time arguing, and break up in the season 3 episode "Mars Landing". She also struggles to fit in with the cool teachers at the school, but eventually befriends them, later becoming a vice-principal. In season 4, she gets in a relationship with Ryan Geauxinue (Julian Morris), a science teacher from England, but they struggle with a school policy that forbids administrator-teacher relationships. They break up after attempting a long-distance relationship.

In season 5, Jess gets sequestered for jury duty, and is absent for several episodes in which Deschanel went on maternity leave. After returning, Jess starts dating Sam again. She becomes a vice-principal at another school. Towards the end of the season, Sam realizes he is in love with former schoolmate Diane, and breaks up with Jess, noting that Jess still harbors feelings for Nick.

In season 6, Jess is part of a singles group, and develops a relationship with Robby McFerrin (Nelson Franklin), whom the rest of her roommates and friends like. In the episode "The Hike", when she and Robby learn that they share relatives in Massachusetts, they realize they are third cousins, and thus end their relationship. She also becomes principal of the private school where she had taught. At the end of season 6, after Nick has broken up with Reagan (Megan Fox), she and Nick reunite as a couple.

Three years later, in the season 7 premiere, Jess and Nick return to the loft after Nick's European book tour, where she sported a nose ring. They are still not engaged or married. Jess takes a job with Russell's company, and in the episode "Lillypads", it is revealed her circumstances from leaving the private school were complicated. On the night of a home visit to adopt a dog they were waiting two years for, Nick proposes to her, and she accepts. The night before the wedding, she and Nick sleep together but it leads to a series of unlucky circumstances and they marry in a hospital hall while Winston's wife Aly (Nasim Pedrad) is giving birth to their child. One month later, as she and Nick move to a smaller apartment, she has the entire gang bid their farewells to the loft by playing one last game of "True American". During their game, a brief flashforward reveals that she and Nick will eventually have a son.

== Reception ==
Deschanel has received one Primetime Emmy and three Golden Globe Award nominations for her role on the show. She has also been nominated multiple times for Favorite Comedic TV Actress at the People's Choice Awards.
