= Rebecca Reid =

British actress

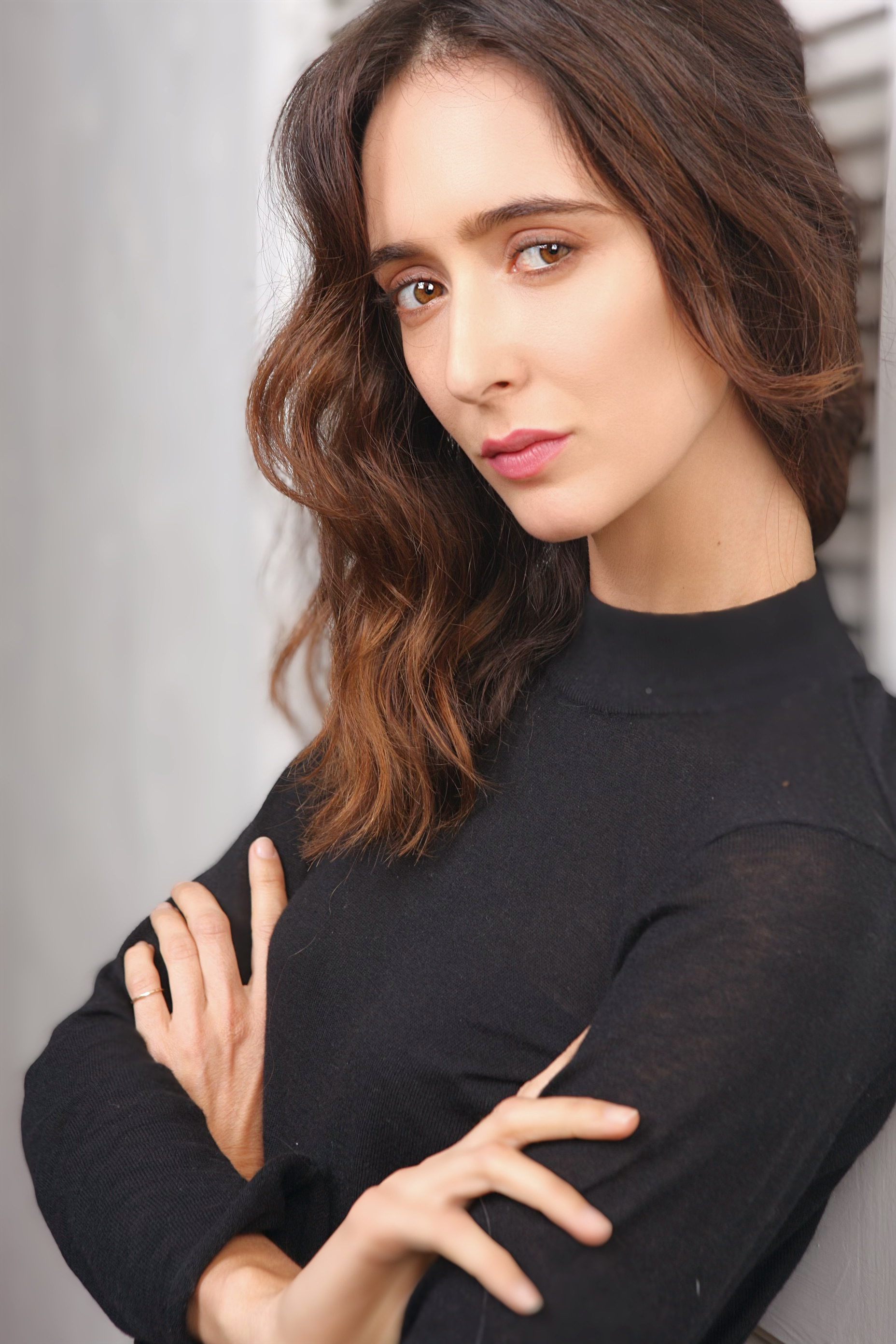
- Reid in 2022
- Born: Rebecca Ballantine Reid
- Occupation: Actress

Rebecca Ballantine Reid is a British actress based in Los Angeles.

== Career ==
Reid appeared as the recurring character, Nadia in the Fox sitcom New Girl. She also starred as Anna in Comedy Central UK's sitcom I Live with Models.

In 2013, Reid was named one of Screen Daily's Stars of Tomorrow.

In 2021, Reid made her directorial debut with the short film I Wish I Had Known.

== Filmography ==
=== Television ===
Year	Title	Role	Notes
2012–2018	New Girl	Nadia	10 episodes
2015	I Live with Models	Anna	8 episodes

=== Documentary ===
Year	Title	Role	Notes
2021	I Wish I Had Known	Director	
