= Lamorne Morris =

American actor (born 1983)

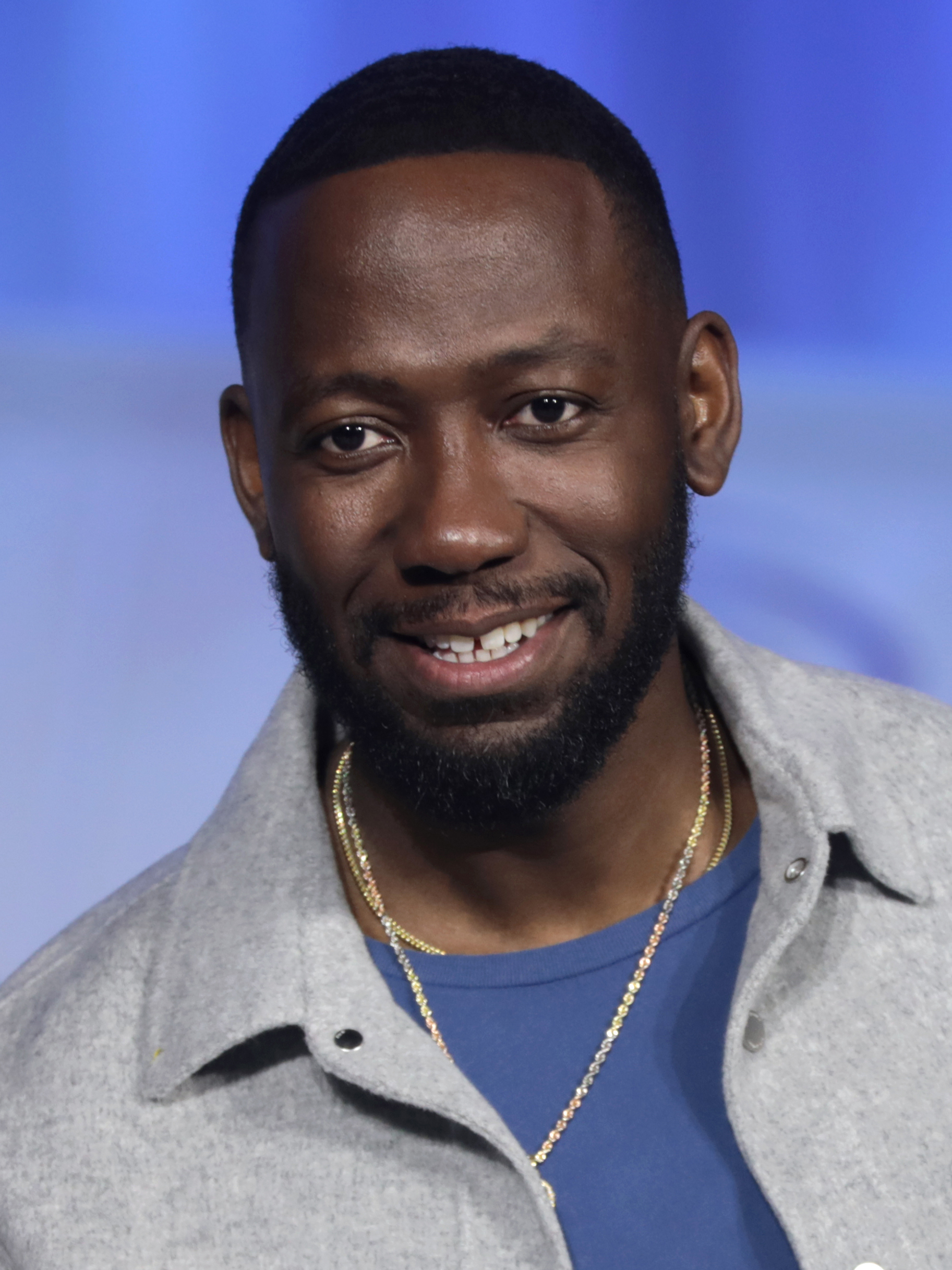
- Morris at the 2022 WonderCon
- Born: August 14, 1983 (age 43); Chicago, Illinois, U.S.
- Occupations: Actor; comedian
- Years active: 2002–present
- Children: 1

Lamorne Morris (born August 14, 1983) is an American actor and comedian. He has played the roles of Winston Bishop in the Fox sitcom New Girl (2011–2018), cartoonist Keef Knight in the Hulu comedy Woke (2020–2022), and State Trooper Whitley "Witt" Farr in the fifth season of Fargo, for which he won a Primetime Emmy Award. He has also starred as Jerrod in Barbershop: The Next Cut (2016), Officer Mikey Jameson in The Christmas Chronicles (2018) and comedian Garrett Morris in Saturday Night (2024).

Morris has also had supporting roles in the comedies Game Night (2018), Yesterday (2019), Jumanji: The Next Level (2019) and the upcoming Jumanji: Open World (2026).

He plays Robbie Robertson in the Prime Video superhero series Spider-Noir and will be voicing the titular character of the Paramount+ animated show Garfield.

== Early life ==
Morris grew up on the South Side of Chicago. As a teenager he moved to the western suburb of Glen Ellyn, where he attended Glenbard South High School. Attorney and political candidate Qasim Rashid was a classmate of his. His mother worked for the United States Postal Service. He also has a brother, Devon. Before he discovered acting, Morris was a class clown who would frequently be sent to detention.

Morris graduated from the College of DuPage in 2003 where he studied theatre and received the Chris Farley Memorial Acting Scholarship. He also attended the Second City Training Center, and was a member of Second City's Outreach And Diversity Ensemble. While studying at Second City, Morris worked as a server at Ed Debevic's, a 1950s-nostalgia-themed restaurant where the servers act rude to the diners.

== Career ==
Morris appeared in commercials for State Farm Insurance, Taco Bell, Twix, Miller Lite, Las Vegas, 7 Up, Edge, Sears, Microsoft Windows, Chili's, McDonald's, Ford, and Hornitos Tequila. In 2019, he became the spokesperson for the Canadian-based Bank of Montreal and the Chicago-based Bank of Montreal subsidiary BMO Harris Bank.

Morris started out as an on-air personality for BET, hosting HotWyred, an interactive tech and gaming show as well as the daily music and entertainment news show BET Now in addition to other appearances. Morris also hosted the game show BrainRush on Cartoon Network as part of CN Real.

Morris's breakthrough came when he was cast as Winston Bishop in the comedy series New Girl on Fox (2011–2018). Morris did not appear until the second episode - originally, Damon Wayans Jr. was a member of the cast, in the role of Coach. However, Wayans's other comedy series, Happy Endings, had already been picked up for a second season on rival network ABC. The producers of New Girl initially planned to recast Wayans's role, but later decided not to recast and instead wrote his character out in the second episode. Morris cowrote the season 4 episode "Par 5" and directed the final season episode in which Winston reconnects with his dad, played by J.B. Smoove.

In November 2018 it was announced that Morris would be starring in a half-hour sitcom, Woke, based on cartoonist Keith Knight's autobiographical comic strip The K Chronicles on Hulu. It ran for two seasons, released in 2020 and 2022, and was canceled in June 2022.

Morris has also appeared in the films Barbershop: The Next Cut (2016), Game Night (2018), The Christmas Chronicles (2018), Jumanji: The Next Level (2019), Yesterday (2019), Bloodshot (2020), and Desperados (2020).

During the COVID-19 lockdown, Morris co-created and starred in the scripted action-comedy podcast Unwanted for QCODE. The 8-episode series revolves around a pair of slackers who attempt to capture an escaped murderer hiding in their town for a million-dollar reward.

In April 2021, it was announced that Morris would co-star in an Indie horror film titled Night Shift, alongside Phoebe Tonkin and Madison Hu. The film will be directed by Paul and Benjamin China.

He began cohosting Welcome to Our Show, a New Girl rewatch podcast with co-stars Hannah Simone and Zooey Deschanel, distributed by IHeartRadio, in January 2022. Morris and Simone went on to host the podcast The Mess Around with Hannah and Lamorne. In 2022, he was cast as North Dakota State Trooper Whitley "Witt" Farr in the fifth season of the FX black comedy-crime drama anthology series Fargo, which premiered in November 2023 and concluded in January 2024. For his performance he won the Primetime Emmy Award for Outstanding Supporting Actor in a Limited or Anthology Series or Movie.

In July 2024, it was announced Morris would play Robbie Robertson in the Spider-Noir television show on Amazon Prime Video. Filming began in September 2024 in Los Angeles.

In March 2026, Morris was announced to be voicing Garfield in upcoming animated series on Paramount+.

== Personal life ==
Comedian Garrett Morris (no relation), whom Morris played in Saturday Night, has had a large impact on his career path as an entertainer. Morris is a baseball, basketball, and bowling fan. He supports semi-retired professional bowler Pete Weber and the Chicago White Sox. Morris has also stated that every room in his house has something to do with basketball.

== Filmography ==
=== Film ===
Year	Title	Role	Notes
2002	Urban Ground Squirrels	Little David	Voice
2009	To Have & Have More	Michael's Agent	
2012	Belizean James: No Gold Anything	Belizean James	Short film
2014	Sex Ed	Bobby the Bouncer	
2016	Barbershop: The Next Cut	Jerrod	
2017	Sandy Wexler	Bling	
2018	Game Night	Kevin Sterling	
2018	The Christmas Chronicles	Mikey Jameson	
2019	Yesterday	Head of Marketing	
2019	Jumanji: The Next Level	Heater Repair Man	Cameo
2020	Bloodshot	Wilfred Wigans	
2020	Desperados	Sean McGuire	
2020	Death of a Telemarketer	Kasey Miller	
2021	How It Ends	Larry	
2023	Night Shift	Teddy Miles	
2024	Not Another Church Movie	Monte Carlo	
2024	Saturday Night	Garrett Morris	
2026	The Sun Never Sets		
2026	Jumanji: Open World	Heater Repair Man	Post-production
2027	Not Alone	TBA	Voice; In production

=== Television ===
Year	Title	Role	Notes
2009	BrainRush	Host	
2010	The Middle	Salesman	Episode: "Royal Wedding"
2011	The Assistants	Scott Smiley	Television film
2011	The Guild	Craven	Episodes: "Megagame-o-ramacon!" and "Invite Accepted"
2011–2018	New Girl	Winston Bishop	Principal cast; 145 episodes Wrote "Par 5"; directed "Godparents"; Nominated – Teen Choice Awards TV Breakout Star: Male
2013	Drunk History	Martin Luther King Jr.	Episode: "Atlanta"
2013	Dear Secret Santa	Jack	Television film
2014	Kroll Show	Tony Bell	Episode: "Krolling Around with Nick Klown"
2015	Lucas Bros. Moving Co.	Karlton (voice)	Episode: "Nutopia"
2017	Star vs. the Forces of Evil	Grandmaster (voice)	Episode: "All Belts Are Off"
2017	SMILF	Adult Larry	Episode: "Run, Bridgette, Run or Forty-Eight Burnt Cupcakes & Graveyard Rum"
2018	Hell's Kitchen	Himself	Guest diner; Episode: "All–Star Finale"
2019	Valley of the Boom	Darrin Morris	
2019	Squinters	Frank	
2020	The Eric Andre Show	N-Word Scissorhands	Episode: "You Got Served"
2020–2022	Woke	Keef Knight	Lead role
2021	Call Me Kat	Daniel	Recurring role, 4 episodes
2021	No Activity	Officer Cooper	Episode: "Not Another Waco!"
2022	The Proud Family: Louder and Prouder	Himself (voice)	Episode: "When You Wish Upon a Roker"
2022–2023	Alice's Wonderland Bakery	Dandy (voice)	2 episodes
2023	Fargo	Trooper Witt Farr	Main role (season 5); Primetime Emmy Award for Outstanding Supporting Actor in a Limited or Anthology Series or Movie
2024	Ghosts	Saul	Episode 7 (season 3): "The Polterguest"
2024	Unstable	Peter	8 episodes
2025	Krapopolis	Anthropomorphic Fly (voice)	Episode: “Love Trap, Baby!”
2026	Spider-Noir	Robbie Robertson	Main role
2026–present	Garfield	Garfield (voice)	Main role

=== Audio ===
Year	Title	Role	Notes
2021	10 Days	Paul Washington	6 episodes

=== Web ===
Year	Title	Role	Notes
2014	"Wiggle" PARODY by Bart Baker	Jason Derulo	Main role

== See also ==
- List of Afro-Latinos
