= Hannah Simone =

British actress (born 1980)

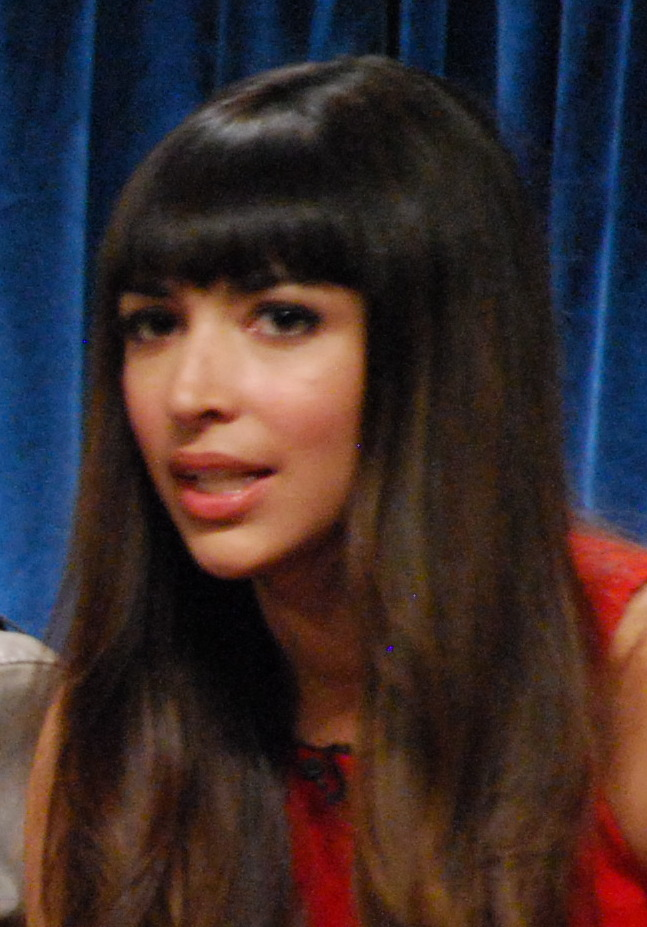
- Simone in March 2012
- Born: 3 August 1980 (age 46); London, England
- Education: Ryerson University
- Occupations: Actress; model; television hostess; VJ
- Years active: 2005–present
- Spouse: Jesse Giddings (m. 2016)
- Children: 1

Hannah Simone (born 3 August 1980) is a British and Canadian actress. She portrayed Cece Parikh on the Fox sitcom New Girl.

== Early life ==
Simone was born in London to a British Indian father and a British mother of German, Italian, and Greek Cypriot descent. She has a brother named Zack. Simone spent her early childhood in Calgary, Alberta, Canada. From ages 7–10, Simone moved through three continents, attending schools in each one. At the age of 13, Simone was living in Cyprus and was working as a fashion model. At 16 years old, Simone lived in New Delhi where she attended the American Embassy School. A year later, at 17, she returned to Canada. Initially settling in White Rock, British Columbia, she subsequently relocated to Vancouver where she attended the University of British Columbia. After her first degree, she returned to London, for a year, where she worked as a human rights and refugees officer for the United Nations.

== Career ==
Following her 2005 graduation from Ryerson University, Simone became host of HGTV Canada's television show Space for Living for its first season.

Simone worked at MuchMusic as a VJ at MuchMusic Headquarters, as a news presenter for "Much News Weekly" and, the host of the show The NewMusic. From May 2006 to November 2008, she worked as a VJ for MuchMusic in Canada. She interviewed artists and bands during her time at Much. She then stated that she had plans to move to Los Angeles, California.

Simone hosted WCG Ultimate Gamer alongside Joel Gourdin on Syfy. The series premiered on 10 March 2009 and ended after its second season on 7 October 2010.

From 2011 to 2018, Simone starred in Fox's comedy New Girl alongside Zooey Deschanel.

Alongside Kate Upton and Génesis Rodríguez, she was featured in Gillette's "What Women Want" campaign in 2013.

In 2014, she starred alongside Danny Trejo in Train's music video "Angel in Blue Jeans".

In 2016, she starred in music video "Same Air" from The Rocket Summer. In 2017, she hosted the reality competition television series Kicking & Screaming.

On 12 February 2018, Simone was announced as the lead in ABC's reboot of The Greatest American Hero; however, ABC declined to pick up the series.

She began cohosting Welcome to Our Show, a New Girl rewatch podcast with co-stars Lamorne Morris and Zooey Deschanel, distributed by iHeartRadio, in January 2022.

== Personal life ==
In 2016, after dating for nearly four years, Simone married musician Jesse Giddings; like Simone, he is also a former VJ at MuchMusic. Simone announced her pregnancy in April 2017, and she gave birth to their son in early August 2017.

== Filmography ==
=== Film ===
Year	Title	Role	Notes
2011	Sati Shaves Her Head	Nikki	Short film
2013	Oldboy	Stephanie Lee	
2015	Miss India America	Sonia Nielson	
2015	Lemonade	Tasha	
2016	Flock of Dudes	Beth	
2016	Folk Hero & Funny Guy	Emily	
2016	Odd Squad: The Movie	Weird Emily	
2017	Band Aid	Grace	
2017	Killing Gunther	Sanaa	
2026	Super Troopers 3	Sarita Makundan	

=== Television ===
Year	Title	Role	Notes
2005	Kevin Hill	Larissa	Episode: "Only Sixteen"
2005	Kojak	Sexy Girl	2 episodes
2006	Beautiful People	Customer Fix Café	Episode: "A Tale of Two Parties"
2009–2010	WCG Ultimate Gamer	Herself / Host	Reality TV
2011–2018	New Girl	Cece Parikh	Main cast Teen Choice Awards Choice TV Breakout Performance — Female
2012	H+: The Digital Series	Leena Param	Web series
2013	1600 Penn	Princess Abigail of Andorra	Episode: "Bursting the Bubble"
2013	So You Think You Can Dance	Herself / Guest judge	Episode: "Las Vegas Callbacks", reality TV
2013	Hot Package	Model	Episode: "Pilot"
2017	Kicking & Screaming	Host	
2018	Single Parents	Dr. Monica Dewan	3 episodes
2019	Weird City	Phephanie	Episode: "Chonathan & Mulia & Barsley & Phephanie"
2019	The Unauthorized Bash Brothers Experience	Amber	TV special
2019	Awokened	Zia	TV movie
2020−2022	Mira, Royal Detective	Pinky (voice)	Main cast
2021	Welcome to Georgia	Penelope	TV movie
2023−2024	Not Dead Yet	Sam	Main cast
2024	Clone High	Lady Godiva (voice)	Episode: "Bible Humpers: A Much Needed Praycation"

=== Other media ===
List of acting appearances in music videos
Year	Title and Artist	Role	Refs
2014	"Angel in Blue Jeans" by Train	Title character	
2016	"Same Air" by The Rocket Summer	Free Falling Girl	
