= List of New Girl episodes =

New Girl is an American television sitcom that premiered on Fox on September 20, 2011. Developed by Elizabeth Meriwether under the working title Chicks & Dicks, the show stars Zooey Deschanel as Jessica "Jess" Day, a well-liked and bubbly woman who is trying to get over her surprise breakup with her boyfriend. With the help of her best friend Cece (Hannah Simone), she finds a new place to stay when she moves in with three single guys: Nick Miller (Jake Johnson), an underachieving bartender; Schmidt (Max Greenfield), who thinks of himself as a modern-day Casanova; and Coach (Damon Wayans, Jr.), who leaves the series in the next episode and is replaced by Winston Bishop (Lamorne Morris), a former professional athlete who achieved modest success abroad and is adjusting to life back in the United States. Coach reappears in the series during seasons three, four, five, six, and seven.

On May 14, 2017, the series was renewed for a seventh and final season, which featured eight episodes. On January 4, 2018, it was announced that the seventh and final season would premiere on April 10, 2018, and also it would end with a one-hour series finale, which was aired on May 15, 2018.

During the course of the series, 146 episodes of New Girl aired over seven seasons.

== Series overview ==
Season	Episodes	Originally released		Rank	Viewers (in millions)
Season	Episodes	First released	Last released	Rank	Viewers (in millions)
1	24	September 20, 2011	May 8, 2012	61	8.22
2	25	September 25, 2012	May 14, 2013	77	5.85
3	23	September 17, 2013	May 6, 2014	103	4.61
4	22	September 16, 2014	May 5, 2015	138	3.42
5	22	January 5, 2016	May 10, 2016	125	3.69
6	22	September 20, 2016	April 4, 2017	133	2.93
7	8	April 10, 2018	May 15, 2018	171	2.18

== Episodes ==
=== Season 1 (2011–12) ===
No. overall	No. in season	Title	Directed by	Written by	Original release date	Prod. code	U.S. viewers (millions)
1	1	"Pilot"	Jake Kasdan	Elizabeth Meriwether	September 20, 2011	1ATM79	10.28
2	2	"Kryptonite"	Jake Kasdan	Elizabeth Meriwether	September 27, 2011	1ATM01	9.28
3	3	"Wedding"	Jason Winer	Donick Cary	October 4, 2011	1ATM04	8.65
4	4	"Naked"	Jake Kasdan	J. J. Philbin	November 1, 2011	1ATM02	7.42
5	5	"Cece Crashes"	John Hamburg	Rachel Axler	November 8, 2011	1ATM03	6.84
6	6	"Thanksgiving"	Miguel Arteta	Berkley Johnson	November 15, 2011	1ATM06	6.91
7	7	"Bells"	Peyton Reed	Luvh Rakhe	November 29, 2011	1ATM05	7.59
8	8	"Bad in Bed"	Jesse Peretz	Josh Malmuth	December 6, 2011	1ATM07	6.79
9	9	"The 23rd"	Jason Winer	Donick Cary	December 13, 2011	1ATM10	6.82
10	10	"The Story of the 50"	Troy Miller	Luvh Rakhe	January 17, 2012	1ATM08	6.97
11	11	"Jess and Julia"	Jake Kasdan	Story by : Luvh Rakhe; Teleplay by : Elizabeth Meriwether & Luvh Rakhe	January 31, 2012	1ATM12	7.29
12	12	"The Landlord"	Peyton Reed	Story by : Joe Port & Joe Wiseman; Teleplay by : Berkley Johnson & Josh Malmuth	February 7, 2012	1ATM11	6.83
13	13	"Valentine's Day"	Tucker Gates	Lesley Wake Webster	February 14, 2012	1ATM13	6.47
14	14	"Bully"	Dan Attias	David Walpert	February 21, 2012	1ATM15	6.27
15	15	"Injured"	Lynn Shelton	Story by : Joe Port & Joe Wiseman and J. J. Philbin; Teleplay by : J. J. Philbin	March 6, 2012	1ATM09	6.00
16	16	"Control"	Jesse Peretz	Brett Baer & Dave Finkel	March 13, 2012	1ATM14	5.74
17	17	"Fancyman, Part 1"	Peyton Reed	J. J. Philbin & Nick Adams	March 20, 2012	1ATM16	5.18
18	18	"Fancyman, Part 2"	Matt Shakman	Berkley Johnson & Kim Rosenstock	March 27, 2012	1ATM17	4.96
19	19	"Secrets"	David Wain	Josh Malmuth	April 3, 2012	1ATM18	4.59
20	20	"Normal"	Jesse Peretz	Luvh Rakhe	April 10, 2012	1ATM19	5.23
21	21	"Kids"	Tristram Shapeero	Donick Cary & Lesley Wake Webster	April 17, 2012	1ATM20	5.22
22	22	"Tomatoes"	Michael Spiller	David Walpert & Kim Rosenstock	April 24, 2012	1ATM21	5.20
23	23	"Backslide"	Nanette Burstein	David Quandt	May 1, 2012	1ATM22	4.40
24	24	"See Ya"	Michael Spiller	Story by : Elizabeth Meriwether; Teleplay by : Brett Baer & Dave Finkel	May 8, 2012	1ATM23	5.61

=== Season 2 (2012–13) ===
No. overall	No. in season	Title	Directed by	Written by	Original release date	Prod. code	U.S. viewers (millions)
25	1	"Re-Launch"	Steve Pink	Kay Cannon	September 25, 2012	2ATM01	5.35
26	2	"Katie"	Larry Charles	Elizabeth Meriwether	September 25, 2012	2ATM02	5.18
27	3	"Fluffer"	Fred Goss	J. J. Philbin	October 2, 2012	2ATM04	4.99
28	4	"Neighbors"	Steve Pink	Berkley Johnson	October 9, 2012	2ATM03	4.94
29	5	"Models"	Eric Appel	Josh Malmuth	October 23, 2012	2ATM05	5.16
30	6	"Halloween"	Jesse Peretz	David Iserson	October 30, 2012	2ATM06	4.75
31	7	"Menzies"	Jason Woliner	Kim Rosenstock	November 13, 2012	2ATM07	4.35
32	8	"Parents"	Jesse Peretz	Ryan Koh	November 20, 2012	2ATM08	4.11
33	9	"Eggs"	Neal Brennan	Kay Cannon	November 27, 2012	2ATM09	4.12
34	10	"Bathtub"	Tristram Shapeero	Donick Cary	December 4, 2012	2ATM10	4.10
35	11	"Santa"	Craig Zisk	Luvh Rakhe	December 11, 2012	2ATM11	4.18
36	12	"Cabin"	Alec Berg	J. J. Philbin	January 8, 2013	2ATM12	3.78
37	13	"A Father's Love"	Jake Kasdan	Berkley Johnson & Josh Malmuth	January 15, 2013	2ATM13	3.65
38	14	"Pepperwood"	Lynn Shelton	Nick Adams	January 22, 2013	2ATM14	4.05
39	15	"Cooler"	Max Winkler	Rebecca Addelman	January 29, 2013	2ATM15	4.74
40	16	"Table 34"	Tristram Shapeero	David Iserson	February 5, 2013	2ATM16	4.83
41	17	"Parking Spot"	Fred Goss	Rebecca Addelman	February 19, 2013	2ATM17	4.31
42	18	"TinFinity"	Max Winkler	Kim Rosenstock & Josh Malmuth	February 26, 2013	2ATM18	4.29
43	19	"Quick Hardening Caulk"	Lorene Scafaria	Story by : Brett Baer & Dave Finkel; Teleplay by : Ryan Koh	March 19, 2013	2ATM19	4.26
44	20	"Chicago"	Jake Kasdan	Luvh Rakhe	March 26, 2013	2ATM20	4.19
45	21	"First Date"	Lynn Shelton	J. J. Philbin & Berkley Johnson	April 4, 2013	2ATM22	4.77
46	22	"Bachelorette Party"	Matt Sohn	Kay Cannon & Sophia Lear	April 9, 2013	2ATM21	4.09
47	23	"Virgins"	Alec Berg	Elizabeth Meriwether	April 30, 2013	2ATM23	3.57
48	24	"Winston's Birthday (Part One)"	Max Winkler	Brett Baer & Dave Finkel	May 7, 2013	2ATM24	3.94
49	25	"Elaine's Big Day"	Jake Kasdan	Christian Magalhães & Bob Snow	May 14, 2013	2ATM25	4.07

=== Season 3 (2013–14) ===
No. overall	No. in season	Title	Directed by	Written by	Original release date	Prod. code	U.S. viewers (millions)
50	1	"All In"	Max Winkler	Elizabeth Meriwether	September 17, 2013	3ATM01	5.53
51	2	"Nerd"	Fred Goss	Kay Cannon	September 24, 2013	3ATM02	4.04
52	3	"Double Date"	Max Winkler	Luvh Rakhe	October 1, 2013	3ATM03	3.85
53	4	"The Captain"	Fred Goss	J. J. Philbin	October 8, 2013	3ATM04	3.96
54	5	"The Box"	Andy Fleming	Rob Rosell	October 15, 2013	3ATM05	3.45
55	6	"Keaton"	David Katzenberg	Dave Finkel & Brett Baer	October 22, 2013	3ATM06	3.74
56	7	"Coach"	Russ Alsobrook	David Feeney	November 5, 2013	3ATM07	3.85
57	8	"Menus"	Trent O'Donnell	Matt Fusfeld & Alex Cuthbertson	November 12, 2013	3ATM08	3.36
58	9	"Longest Night Ever"	Nicholas Jasenovec	Ryan Koh	November 19, 2013	3ATM09	3.26
59	10	"Thanksgiving III"	Max Winkler	Josh Malmuth	November 26, 2013	3ATM10	3.51
60	11	"Clavado En Un Bar"	Eric Appel	Berkley Johnson	January 7, 2014	3ATM11	3.20
61	12	"Basketsball"	Lorene Scafaria	Rebecca Addelman	January 14, 2014	3ATM13	3.24
62	13	"Birthday"	Richie Keen	Kim Rosenstock	January 21, 2014	3ATM12	3.75
63	14	"Prince"	Fred Goss	David Feeney & Rob Rosell	February 2, 2014	3ATM15	26.30
64	15	"Exes"	Alex Hardcastle	Nina Pedrad	February 4, 2014	3ATM14	3.48
65	16	"Sister"	Max Winkler	Matt Fusfeld & Alex Cuthbertson	February 11, 2014	3ATM16	2.97
66	17	"Sister II"	Bill Purple	Ryan Koh & Luvh Rakhe	February 25, 2014	3ATM17	2.84
67	18	"Sister III"	Jay Chandrasekhar	Camilla Blackett	March 4, 2014	3ATM18	2.93
68	19	"Fired Up"	Steve Welch	Sophia Lear	March 11, 2014	3ATM19	2.48
69	20	"Mars Landing"	Lynn Shelton	Josh Malmuth & Nina Pedrad	March 25, 2014	3ATM20	2.49
70	21	"Big News"	Steven Tsuchida	Berkley Johnson & Kim Rosenstock	April 15, 2014	3ATM21	2.19
71	22	"Dance"	Trent O'Donnell	Rebecca Addelman & Ryan Koh	April 29, 2014	3ATM22	2.20
72	23	"Cruise"	Elizabeth Meriwether	Luvh Rakhe & Rob Rosell	May 6, 2014	3ATM23	2.40

=== Season 4 (2014–15) ===
No. overall	No. in season	Title	Directed by	Written by	Original release date	Prod. code	U.S. viewers (millions)
73	1	"The Last Wedding"	Trent O'Donnell	J. J. Philbin	September 16, 2014	4ATM01	3.04
74	2	"Dice"	Lynn Shelton	Matt Fusfeld & Alex Cuthbertson	September 23, 2014	4ATM02	2.35
75	3	"Julie Berkman's Older Sister"	Fred Goss	Nina Pedrad	September 30, 2014	4ATM03	2.37
76	4	"Micro"	Jay Chandrasekhar	Josh Malmuth	October 7, 2014	4ATM04	2.61
77	5	"Landline"	Trent O'Donnell	Rob Rosell	October 14, 2014	4ATM05	2.26
78	6	"Background Check"	Lorene Scafaria	Rebecca Addelman	November 4, 2014	4ATM06	3.38
79	7	"Goldmine"	Russ Alsobrook	Berkley Johnson	November 11, 2014	4ATM07	3.04
80	8	"Teachers"	Trent O'Donnell	Kim Rosenstock	November 18, 2014	4ATM08	2.83
81	9	"Thanksgiving IV"	Fred Goss	David Feeney	November 25, 2014	4ATM09	2.77
82	10	"Girl Fight"	Bill Purple	Danielle Sanchez-Witzel	December 2, 2014	4ATM10	3.00
83	11	"LAXmas"	Trent O'Donnell	Matt Fusfeld & Alex Cuthbertson	December 9, 2014	4ATM11	3.28
84	12	"Shark"	Alex Hardcastle	Jacob Brown & Rob Rosell	January 6, 2015	4ATM12	3.19
85	13	"Coming Out"	Bill Purple	Sophia Lear	January 13, 2015	4ATM13	2.90
86	14	"Swuit"	Trent O'Donnell	Noah Garfinkel	February 3, 2015	4ATM14	2.96
87	15	"The Crawl"	Jay Chandrasekhar	Kim Rosenstock	February 10, 2015	4ATM15	2.71
88	16	"Oregon"	Russ Alsobrook	Nina Pedrad	February 17, 2015	4ATM16	3.08
89	17	"Spiderhunt"	Steve Welch	Berkley Johnson	February 24, 2015	4ATM17	2.85
90	18	"Walk of Shame"	Christine Gernon	Danielle Sanchez-Witzel	March 3, 2015	4ATM18	2.53
91	19	"The Right Thing"	Erin O'Malley	Matt Fusfeld & Alex Cuthbertson	March 31, 2015	4ATM19	2.32
92	20	"Par 5"	Trent O'Donnell	Lamorne Morris & Rob Rosell	April 7, 2015	4ATM20	2.14
93	21	"Panty Gate"	Reginald Hudlin	David Feeney & Veronica McCarthy	April 28, 2015	4ATM21	2.07
94	22	"Clean Break"	Trent O'Donnell	Story by : Rebecca Addelman; Teleplay by : Rebecca Addelman & Kim Rosenstock	May 5, 2015	4ATM22	2.22

=== Season 5 (2016) ===
No. overall	No. in season	Title	Directed by	Written by	Original release date	Prod. code	U.S. viewers (millions)
95	1	"Big Mama P"	Erin O'Malley	Berkley Johnson	January 5, 2016	5ATM03	3.33
96	2	"What About Fred"	Eric Appel	Matt Fusfeld & Alex Cuthbertson	January 12, 2016	5ATM01	3.25
97	3	"Jury Duty"	Trent O'Donnell	Josh Malmuth & Nina Pedrad	January 19, 2016	5ATM02	2.95
98	4	"No Girl"	Elizabeth Meriwether	Rob Rosell	January 26, 2016	5ATM04	2.84
99	5	"Bob & Carol & Nick & Schmidt"	Jake Johnson	Rob Rosell	February 2, 2016	5ATM05	2.94
100	6	"Reagan"	Trent O'Donnell	Kim Rosenstock	February 9, 2016	5ATM06	3.10
101	7	"Wig"	Christine Gernon	David Feeney	February 16, 2016	5ATM07	2.80
102	8	"The Decision"	Trent O'Donnell	Luvh Rakhe	February 23, 2016	5ATM08	2.68
103	9	"Heat Wave"	Erin O'Malley	Matt Fusfeld & Alex Cuthbertson	March 1, 2016	5ATM09	2.62
104	10	"Goosebumps Walkaway"	Trent O'Donnell	Berkley Johnson	March 8, 2016	5ATM10	2.65
105	11	"The Apartment"	Christine Gernon	Nina Pedrad	March 15, 2016	5ATM11	2.30
106	12	"D-Day"	Michael Schultz	Josh Malmuth	March 22, 2016	5ATM12	2.25
107	13	"Sam, Again"	Steve Welch	Ethan Sandler & Adrian Wenner	March 29, 2016	5ATM13	2.21
108	14	"300 Feet"	Trent O'Donnell	Sophia Lear	April 12, 2016	5ATM14	2.65
109	15	"Jeff Day"	Jay Chandrasekhar	Joe Wengert	April 19, 2016	5ATM15	1.92
110	16	"Helmet"	Josh Greenbaum	Sarah Nevada Smith	April 19, 2016	5ATM18	1.92
111	17	"Road Trip"	Trent O'Donnell	Noah Garfinkel	April 26, 2016	5ATM16	2.42
112	18	"A Chill Day In"	Erin O'Malley	Sarah Tapscott	April 26, 2016	5ATM17	1.87
113	19	"Dress"	Trent O'Donnell	David Feeney & Josh Malmuth	May 3, 2016	5ATM19	2.27
114	20	"Return to Sender"	Russ Alsobrook	Veronica McCarthy	May 3, 2016	5ATM20	1.88
115	21	"Wedding Eve"	Trent O'Donnell	Nina Pedrad & Kim Rosenstock	May 10, 2016	5ATM21	2.34
116	22	"Landing Gear"	Erin O'Malley	Luvh Rakhe	May 10, 2016	5ATM22	2.17

=== Season 6 (2016–17) ===
No. overall	No. in season	Title	Directed by	Written by	Original release date	Prod. code	U.S. viewers (millions)
117	1	"House Hunt"	Zooey Deschanel	Luvh Rakhe	September 20, 2016	6ATM01	2.31
118	2	"Hubbedy Bubby"	Steve Welch	Sarah Tapscott	September 27, 2016	6ATM02	2.03
119	3	"Single and Sufficient"	Michael Schultz	Kim Rosenstock & Joe Wengert	October 4, 2016	6ATM03	2.03
120	4	"Homecoming"	Trent O'Donnell	Matt Fusfeld & Alex Cuthbertson	October 11, 2016	6ATM04	1.95
121	5	"Jaipur Aviv"	Erin O'Malley	Berkley Johnson	October 18, 2016	6ATM05	1.81
122	6	"Ready"	Trent O'Donnell	Noah Garfinkel	November 15, 2016	6ATM07	1.94
123	7	"Last Thanksgiving"	Trent O'Donnell	Joni Lefkowitz	November 22, 2016	6ATM08	1.76
124	8	"James Wonder"	Trent O'Donnell	Ethan Sandler & Adrian Wenner	November 29, 2016	6ATM06	1.81
125	9	"Es Good"	Trent O'Donnell	Rob Rosell	December 6, 2016	6ATM09	1.73
126	10	"Christmas Eve Eve"	Trent O'Donnell	Sophia Lear	December 13, 2016	6ATM10	1.62
127	11	"Raisin's Back"	Dana Fox	Eliot Glazer	January 3, 2017	6ATM11	2.48
128	12	"The Cubicle"	Jay Chandrasekhar	Kim Rosenstock	January 10, 2017	6ATM12	2.48
129	13	"Cece's Boys"	Trent O'Donnell	Joe Wengert	January 17, 2017	6ATM13	2.37
130	14	"The Hike"	Josh Greenbaum	Sarah Tapscott	January 24, 2017	6ATM14	2.35
131	15	"Glue"	Trent O'Donnell	Marquita J. Robinson	February 7, 2017	6ATM15	2.23
132	16	"Operation: Bobcat"	Steve Welch	Lamar Woods	February 14, 2017	6ATM16	2.13
133	17	"Rumspringa"	Josh Greenbaum	Sophia Lear & Noah Garfinkel	February 21, 2017	6ATM17	2.25
134	18	"Young Adult"	Jay Chandrasekhar	Jason Daugherity	February 28, 2017	6ATM18	2.09
135	19	"Socalyalcon VI"	Trent O'Donnell	Berkley Johnson	March 14, 2017	6ATM20	1.79
136	20	"Misery"	Erin O'Malley	Luvh Rakhe	March 21, 2017	6ATM21	1.98
137	21	"San Diego"	Trent O'Donnell	David Feeney & Rob Rosell	March 28, 2017	6ATM22	2.16
138	22	"Five Stars for Beezus"	Erin O'Malley	Elizabeth Meriwether	April 4, 2017	6ATM19	2.00

=== Season 7 (2018) ===
No. overall	No. in season	Title	Directed by	Written by	Original release date	Prod. code	U.S. viewers (millions)
139	1	"About Three Years Later"	Erin O'Malley	Berkley Johnson	April 10, 2018	7ATM01	1.83
140	2	"Tuesday Meeting"	Josh Greenbaum	Sarah Tapscott	April 17, 2018	7ATM02	1.58
141	3	"Lillypads"	Trent O'Donnell	J. J. Philbin	April 24, 2018	7ATM03	1.51
142	4	"Where the Road Goes"	Michael Schultz	Noah Garfinkel	May 1, 2018	7ATM04	1.33
143	5	"Godparents"	Lamorne Morris	Lamar Woods	May 8, 2018	7ATM05	1.40
144	6	"Mario"	Jay Chandrasekhar	Joe Wengert	May 8, 2018	7ATM06	1.24
145	7	"The Curse of the Pirate Bride"	Josh Greenbaum	Ann Kim	May 15, 2018	7ATM07	1.47
146	8	"Engram Pattersky"	Erin O'Malley	Story by : Dave Finkel & Brett Baer; Teleplay by : Elizabeth Meriwether	May 15, 2018	7ATM08	1.46

== Ratings ==
New Girl : U.S. viewers per episode (millions)

Season	Episode number																									Average
Season	1	2	3	4	5	6	7	8	9	10	11	12	13	14	15	16	17	18	19	20	21	22	23	24	25	Average
1	10.28	9.28	8.65	7.42	6.84	6.91	7.59	6.79	6.82	6.97	7.29	6.83	6.47	6.27	6.00	5.74	5.18	4.96	4.59	5.23	5.22	5.20	4.40	5.61	–	6.56
2	5.35	5.18	4.99	4.94	5.16	4.75	4.35	4.11	4.12	4.10	4.18	3.78	3.65	4.05	4.74	4.83	4.31	4.29	4.26	4.19	4.77	4.09	3.57	3.94	4.07	4.39
3	5.53	4.04	3.85	3.96	3.45	3.74	3.85	3.36	3.26	3.51	3.20	3.24	3.75	26.30	3.48	2.97	2.84	2.93	2.48	2.49	2.19	2.20	2.40	–		4.31
4	3.04	2.35	2.37	2.61	2.26	3.38	3.04	2.83	2.77	3.00	3.28	3.19	2.90	2.96	2.71	3.08	2.85	2.53	2.32	2.14	2.07	2.22	–			2.72
5	3.33	3.25	2.95	2.84	2.94	3.10	2.80	2.68	2.62	2.65	2.30	2.25	2.21	2.65	1.92	1.92	2.42	1.87	2.27	1.88	2.34	2.17	–			2.52
6	2.31	2.03	2.03	1.95	1.81	1.94	1.76	1.81	1.73	1.62	2.48	2.48	2.37	2.35	2.23	2.13	2.25	2.09	1.79	1.98	2.16	2.00	–			2.06
7	1.83	1.58	1.51	1.33	1.40	1.24	1.47	1.46	–																	1.48

Audience measurement performed by Nielsen Media Research (Note: The viewership statistics in the graph and table are sourced from the citations in the season-specific tables above.)
