= New Girl season 1 =

Season of television series

New Girl
- Season 1
- DVD cover art
- Starring: Zooey Deschanel; Jake Johnson; Max Greenfield; Damon Wayans Jr.; Lamorne Morris; Hannah Simone
- No. of episodes: 24

Release
- Original network: Fox
- Original release: September 20, 2011 – May 8, 2012

Season chronology
- Next → Season 2

The first season of the American television sitcom New Girl premiered on Fox on September 20, 2011, and concluded on May 8, 2012, consisting of 24 episodes. Developed by Elizabeth Meriwether under the working title Chicks & Dicks, the series revolves around offbeat teacher Jess (Zooey Deschanel) after she moves into a Los Angeles loft with three single men, Nick (Jake Johnson), Schmidt (Max Greenfield), and Winston (Lamorne Morris). Jess's best friend Cece (Hannah Simone) also appears regularly. The show combines comedy and drama elements as the characters, who are around 30 years old, deal with relationships and career choices.

== Cast and characters ==
=== Main cast ===
- Zooey Deschanel as Jessica "Jess" Day
- Jake Johnson as Nick Miller
- Max Greenfield as Schmidt
- Damon Wayans Jr. as Coach (Note: Only credited in the pilot.)
- Lamorne Morris as Winston Bishop (Note: Credited from "Kryptonite" onwards.)
- Hannah Simone as CeCe

=== Recurring cast ===
- Mary Elizabeth Ellis as Caroline
- Justin Long as Paul Genzlinger
- Michaela Watkins as Gina
- Gillian Vigman as Kim
- Rachael Harris as Tanya Lamontagne
- Lizzy Caplan as Julia
- Kali Hawk as Shelby
- Dermot Mulroney as Russell
- Phil Hendrie as Joe Napoli

=== Guest cast ===
- Natasha Lyonne as Gretchen
- Katie Cassidy as Brooke
- Lake Bell as Amanda
- Ki Hong Lee as Hector
- Eva Amurri as Beth
- Stephen Amell as Kyle
- Matt Besser as Martin Fuller
- Clyde Kusatsu as Judge
- Jeff Kober as Remy
- Clark Duke as Cliff
- Ryan Kwanten as Oliver
- Joey King as Brianna
- June Diane Raphael as Sadie
- Randall Park as Wil
- Martin Starr as Dirk
- Katrina Bowden as Holly
- Jazz Raycole as Miriam
- Kareem Abdul-Jabbar as himself
- Rizwan Manji as Interviewer
- Jeanne Tripplehorn as Ouli
- Madhur Jaffrey as Nana
- Thomas Lennon as Neil

== Episodes ==
| No. overall | No. in season | Title | Directed by | Written by | Original release date | Prod. code | U.S. viewers (millions) |
|---|---|---|---|---|---|---|---|
| 1 | 1 | "Pilot" | Jake Kasdan | Elizabeth Meriwether | September 20, 2011 | 1ATM79 | 10.28 |
Jessica "Jess" Day (Zooey Deschanel) comes home to find her partner cheating on her with another woman. Heartbroken over it, she splits up with him and moves into a loft apartment with three young single men, Schmidt (Max Greenfield), Nick (Jake Johnson) and Coach (Damon Wayans Jr.) - whom she meets though an Internet ad. The guys try their best to get her out of the apartment and back into the dating life with the help of Jess' best friend Cece (Hannah Simone). They end up with more than they expect when they find themselves truly caring for her as a friend.
| 2 | 2 | "Kryptonite" | Jake Kasdan | Elizabeth Meriwether | September 27, 2011 | 1ATM01 | 9.28 |
Jess breaks the television in the living room by accidentally throwing a basketball at it. Nick and Schmidt try to convince Jess to retrieve her TV (to replace the one she broke) and personal belongings from the house she had shared with her now ex-partner, which she and her friends do. After Coach leaves, the original third roommate Winston (Lamorne Morris) returns and attempts to manipulate Schmidt into switching rooms since Schmidt now occupies Winston's original, larger bedroom.
| 3 | 3 | "Wedding" | Jason Winer | Donick Cary | October 4, 2011 | 1ATM04 | 8.65 |
Nick is worried that he will run into Caroline (Mary Elizabeth Ellis), his ex-girlfriend, at a mutual friend's wedding the guys are invited to. He asks Jess to be his date and pretend to be his girlfriend. At the wedding, Winston takes his job as usher far too seriously. Schmidt attempts to woo Brooke (Katie Cassidy), a former crush. He also catches the eye of his sexually abusive "frenemy," Gretchen (Natasha Lyonne) - whom he goes to bed with.
| 4 | 4 | "Naked" | Jake Kasdan | J. J. Philbin | November 1, 2011 | 1ATM02 | 7.42 |
Jess walks in on Nick in his bedroom, not realizing that he would be naked. She laughs, then leaves the room. This ruins his self-confidence with Amanda (Lake Bell), a new co-worker with whom he is intending to have casual sex. Amanda takes Nick to her apartment, where he is too uncomfortable and distracted to take his clothes off because of Jess' earlier intrusion and Amanda having a photo of Barack Obama on her bedroom wall. Cece suggests to Jess that Nick seeing Jess nude would solve the problem by leveling the situation. Jess is in Nick's room, wearing only a towel, intending to show him her naked body in order to level things. When Nick brings Amanda to his bedroom, Jess hides. Nick sees Jess trying to crawl out of the room unnoticed while he and Amanda are undressing. All three are horrified, and Jess hurriedly leaves – her towel accidentally falling to the floor as she does so. Amanda leaves, having been scared off. Schmidt feels deprived due to not having seen Nick's genitals, and repeatedly makes failed attempts to see them. To ace a job interview, Winston tries to brush up on pop culture of the past two years. Schmidt informs him that the country is broke; that Betty White is back, but all the other Golden Girls are dead. Winston watches The King's Speech, The Human Centipede, Precious and David After Dentist.
| 5 | 5 | "Cece Crashes" | John Hamburg | Rachel Axler | November 8, 2011 | 1ATM03 | 6.84 |
Jess and Cece go to a nightclub, then go back to the apartment together. Cece convinces Jess that Nick may be sexually attracted to her. Schmidt tries to have casual sex with Cece. She gets into his bed with him, but they merely talk and hold hands. He phones Winston, telling him of his 'success'. Winston replies by telling him that does not count as 'closing'.
| 6 | 6 | "Thanksgiving" | Miguel Arteta | Berkley Johnson | November 15, 2011 | 1ATM06 | 6.91 |
Jess invites Paul (Justin Long), a teacher at her school on whom she has a crush, for Thanksgiving dinner at the apartment. Everyone there warms to Paul, except for Nick. Cece becomes attracted to Schmidt while he is cooking the dinner. Jess has bought the frozen turkey too late, and tries various methods of thawing it. While warming it in the tumble dryer, the turkey catches fire. Jess takes the group into the apartment of her neighbor, Mrs. Beverly, whom she believes is visiting her sister. Paul finds Mrs. Beverly dead on her toilet. The group go to a Black Friday sale.
| 7 | 7 | "Bells" | Peyton Reed | Luvh Rakhe | November 29, 2011 | 1ATM05 | 7.59 |
Jess brings her handbell team to the apartment. It consists of delinquent students from her school who are doing it as an alternative to detention. Winston joins in and is very good at it. Nick and Schmidt argue over money and Nick frequently bodging things in the apartment instead of fixing them.
| 8 | 8 | "Bad in Bed" | Jesse Peretz | Josh Malmuth | December 6, 2011 | 1ATM07 | 6.79 |
In Jess' bedroom, she and Paul undress to have sex, but she decides against it. She thinks she will not be good at sex after being monogamous for years, so she asks her roommates for sex advice. Paul has little sexual experience and is also anxious. On another occasion, they again try to have sex in her bedroom, but this fails due to inept attempts at dirty talk by both of them, her complex starfish outfit and her trying to choke him. They have sex on their third attempt, in Jess' building's elevator. Schmidt competes with a female co-worker (Eva Amurri) at his boss' (Michaela Watkins) baby shower.
| 9 | 9 | "The 23rd" | Jason Winer | Donick Cary | December 13, 2011 | 1ATM10 | 6.82 |
Schmidt buys Cece a perfume which he had made for her. Paul gives Jess two tickets to Vienna and to the Salzburg Festival. She gives him a model of a heart. He tells her that he loves her. Schmidt brings the gang along with him to his office Christmas party, where Winston becomes friendly with the son of Schmidt's boss.
| 10 | 10 | "The Story of the 50" | Troy Miller | Luvh Rakhe | January 17, 2012 | 1ATM08 | 6.97 |
Schmidt is disappointed that the party bus that he hired for his 29th birthday party has been assigned to Frankie Muniz instead. Jess uses a school bus for the party, which she invites her boss Tanya (Rachael Harris) to. Jess hires a stripper for the party, but due to a misunderstanding, the stripper is male. Schmidt asks the stripper how to get into his line of work. Schmidt is disappointed when the stripper tells him that he earns $7,000 per year and that at least 90% of his clients are male. Nick introduces his new lawyer sex buddy Julia (Lizzy Caplan) to the gang.
| 11 | 11 | "Jess and Julia" | Jake Kasdan | Story by : Luvh Rakhe; Teleplay by : Elizabeth Meriwether & Luvh Rakhe | January 31, 2012 | 1ATM12 | 7.29 |
Julia helps Jess fight a traffic ticket, but it results in a disagreement between them. They are very different and quickly take a disliking to each other. Winston reunites with Shelby (Kali Hawk), who was his booty call for two years, until two years ago. He wants to rekindle that arrangement, but she is unwilling to. Schmidt is puzzled why his towel is always wet. He is horrified when Nick tells him that he regularly uses the same towel.
| 12 | 12 | "The Landlord" | Peyton Reed | Story by : Joe Port & Joe Wiseman; Teleplay by : Berkley Johnson & Josh Malmuth | February 7, 2012 | 1ATM11 | 6.83 |
Nick and Jess are threatened by a man with a gun when they want the same parking space. Jess puts the gang's living arrangements in jeopardy when she brings the quirky landlord Remy (Jeff Kober) into the apartment to fix things, against Nick's wishes. Nick points out to her that Remy wants to have sex with her, but she insists that Remy is just being friendly. Jess invites Remy to have dinner with her at the apartment. Schmidt and Winston leave, but Nick joins Jess and Remy. Remy assumes that they are going to have a devil's threesome, but Jess backs out of it. Schmidt struggles with how to respond to his boss Kim's (Gillian Vigman) ambiguous advances towards him.
| 13 | 13 | "Valentine's Day" | Tucker Gates | Lesley Wake Webster | February 14, 2012 | 1ATM13 | 6.47 |
On Valentine's Day, Jess recruits Schmidt to go out and help her find a guy with whom to have her first one-night stand. At a bar, she meets Oliver (Ryan Kwanten), who is young, handsome and boring. She and Schmidt think he is ideal for her to have a one-night stand with because she has nothing in common with him. Cece's acquaintance Kurt joins her at the bar. Jess goes back to Oliver's apartment, driven by Schmidt because neither Jess nor Oliver have a car. At Oliver's apartment, the three watch Rise of the Planet of the Apes together. Jess and Oliver do not have sex because his former partner, Amy, who still lives with him, walks in. Oliver and Amy get back together. Cece picks Schmidt up because his car cannot be driven because its wheels have been stolen. Jess goes home and decides to hook up with Schmidt, but does not because Nick walks in as she is about to go into Schmidt's bedroom. Schmidt does not know what almost happened, because he is hooking up with Cece. Winston visits Shelby at her apartment, assuming that it will be just the two of them. When he arrives, he is disappointed to see that she is having a girls' night in with two of her friends. Nick spends the evening with a very busy Julia and her unpaid intern, Cliff (Clark Duke), who is attracted to her. Cliff quits his job.
| 14 | 14 | "Bully" | Dan Attias | David Walpert | February 21, 2012 | 1ATM15 | 6.27 |
Jess intervenes when a 12-year-old student of hers, Nathaniel, has been bullied for a few months. She subsequently becomes the target of one of the bullies in the same class, Brianna (Joey King), who makes a video mocking Jess and uploads it to the Internet. In anger, Jess breaks the robotic arm which Brianna made for her science project. Schmidt and Cece continue their sex meetings. He wants to boast about their sex life but she does not want their friends to know about it, so he sneaks her into the apartment without their knowledge. Nick is worried when Julia sends him a cactus while she is in Beijing. He tries to figure out what it means about their relationship. She ends their fling because he left her seven voicemails asking about the meaning of giving it to him.
| 15 | 15 | "Injured" | Lynn Shelton | Story by : Joe Port & Joe Wiseman and J. J. Philbin; Teleplay by : J. J. Philbin | March 6, 2012 | 1ATM09 | 6.00 |
Nick injures himself during a game of American football in the park - and refuses to see a doctor because of his lack of medical insurance. Jess takes him to see her OB/GYN friend, Sadie (June Diane Raphael), for treatment. However, the diagnosis is much more serious than anyone expects, and it causes him to evaluate his life and friends. Winston must make a decision about his car. Schmidt and Cece's relationship opens up to a more emotional side.
| 16 | 16 | "Control" | Jesse Peretz | Brett Baer & Dave Finkel | March 13, 2012 | 1ATM14 | 5.74 |
Jess learns firsthand about Schmidt's phobia regarding clean surroundings. Winston pesters Nick about owing him money from a poker game. Schmidt and Cece continue their sexual relationship, with Cece being the dominant partner, showing up in the middle of the night.
| 17 | 17 | "Fancyman" | Peyton Reed | J. J. Philbin & Nick Adams | March 20, 2012 | 1ATM16 | 5.18 |
| 18 | 18 | "Fancyman" | Matt Shakman | Berkley Johnson & Kim Rosenstock | March 27, 2012 | 1ATM17 | 4.96 |
Part 1: Jess disagrees with a student's father, Russell (Dermot Mulroney), in regard to his daughter Sarah's priorities. When she goes to confront him about it, she ends up falling for him instead. Nick decides that he does not need a cell phone. Winston tries to impress Shelby by proving that he knows more trivia than Schmidt does. Part 2: Jess and Russell go on their first date, but Jess feels uncomfortable afterward when Russell seems insufficiently interested in her. Nick's old college roommate, Dirk (Martin Starr), visits and encourages Nick to date younger female college students. Winston finally decides to tell Shelby how he feels about her. He borrows Schmidt's car and drives to Mexico, where he thinks she is. He finds out that Schmidt and Cece are sex buddies after a United States Border Patrol officer finds them naked in the back of the car when Winston is driving back into the U.S.
| 19 | 19 | "Secrets" | David Wain | Josh Malmuth | April 3, 2012 | 1ATM18 | 4.59 |
Winston spills the beans about Schmidt and Cece's casual sexual relationship, and the news finally spreads to Jess who does not take it well. Jess decides the roommates should be free with their secrets and is horrified at the secrets Cece reveals to her. Nick goes to Schmidt for dating advice.
| 20 | 20 | "Normal" | Jesse Peretz | Luvh Rakhe | April 10, 2012 | 1ATM19 | 5.23 |
After spending a week at Russell's house, Jess returns the favor by having Russell stay over at the apartment with the guys for a weekend. The weekend does not turn out as planned. Winston gets his dream job, when he is hired to work for his favorite sports radio host (Phil Hendrie), who turns out to be a short-tempered jerk. Kareem Abdul-Jabbar makes a cameo appearance.
| 21 | 21 | "Kids" | Tristram Shapeero | Donick Cary & Lesley Wake Webster | April 17, 2012 | 1ATM20 | 5.22 |
Jess meets Russell's ex-wife Ouli (Jeanne Tripplehorn) and agrees to babysit Sarah (Annalise Basso) at the apartment. Jess is horrified when Sarah becomes attracted to Nick. Cece is scared that she is pregnant with Schmidt's child. Nick dates an artsy college student Chloe (Chloe Bridges), who is 18 – younger than Nick thought. Winston tries to get his boss on the set of a talk show hosted by Michael Strahan.
| 22 | 22 | "Tomatoes" | Michael Spiller | David Walpert & Kim Rosenstock | April 24, 2012 | 1ATM21 | 5.20 |
Jess assumes that there is still irritating sexual tension between Russell and his ex-wife Ouli, so she attempts to get the same kind of feelings from him, which does not go as planned. Nick attempts to grow tomatoes and temporarily give up on dating, but fails to do so. Cece admits her feelings to Schmidt after he is hospitalized in a sexual incident with her roommate Nadia.
| 23 | 23 | "Backslide" | Nanette Burstein | David Quandt | May 1, 2012 | 1ATM22 | 4.40 |
Jess, still heartbroken over her breakup with Russell, has a one-night stand with Paul. He later reveals that he has a girlfriend, Jenn (Melissa Tang) – whom Jess describes as an Asian version of her. Paul tells Jenn, in front of Jess, that he had sex with Jess two days ago. He proposes to Jenn in front of Jess; Jenn accepts. Winston has his left ear pierced during a wild night out with his boss. Schmidt tells him that he looks ridiculous. Cece introduces Schmidt to her grandmother (Madhur Jaffrey) in her old people's home. Nick is back with Caroline. He is puzzled when she tells him that she is 33 – three years older than him. She had previously told him that she was the same age as him. He decides to move in with her, despite Schmidt and Winston trying to persuade him not to by reminding him of how unhappy she made him.
| 24 | 24 | "See Ya" | Michael Spiller | Story by : Elizabeth Meriwether; Teleplay by : Brett Baer & Dave Finkel | May 8, 2012 | 1ATM23 | 5.61 |
Schmidt's penis needs to be put in a cast and feeling inadequate he drives Cece away. Nick freaks out about moving in with Caroline and drives his moving van, with Schmidt and Winston, into the desert and throws the key into a gully. Jess drives out with Cece to rescue them, but throws her key into the gully to stop Nick returning to Caroline. Nick and Jess search for the keys in the dark and encounter a coyote. Jess tells him that she wants him to be happy. Jess finds her key, which was in her pocket, and drives everyone to Nick and Caroline's new apartment. Later that night, Nick turns up at the loft in the van.

== Reception ==
On the review aggregator website Rotten Tomatoes, the season holds an approval rating of 84% based on 32 reviews, with an average rating of 6.83/10. The site's critical consensus reads, "Zooey Deschanel's offbeat style gets a worthy showcase in New Girl, and while it can get awfully cutesy at times, the show benefits from witty writing and a strong supporting cast." Metacritic, which uses a weighted average, assigned the season a score of 66 out of 100 based on 25 critics, indicating "generally favorable" reviews.

== Home media release ==
Fox Home Entertainment released season 1 on DVD in region 1 on October 2, 2012, a week after the second-season premiere. The three disc set includes deleted & extended scenes, audio commentary for three episodes, a gag reel, three featurettes and alternate jokes. A sneak peek to Ben and Kate is also included in the DVD.
