= List of awards and nominations received by New Girl =

New Girl awards and nominations
Awards and nominations
| Award | Wins | Nominations |
| ADG Excellence in Production Design Awards | 0 | 1 |
| ASCAP Film and Television Music Awards | 1 | 1 |
| Critics' Choice Television Awards | 2 | 9 |
| Golden Globe Awards | 0 | 5 |
| National Television Awards | 0 | 1 |
| People's Choice Awards | 0 | 10 |
| Primetime Emmy Awards | 0 | 5 |
| Satellite Awards | 0 | 3 |
| Teen Choice Awards | 1 | 12 |
| Television Critics Association Awards | 0 | 3 |
| Writers Guild of America Awards | 0 | 2 |
| Young Artist Awards | 0 | 1 |

Totals (Note: Certain award groups do not simply award one winner. They acknowledge several different recipients, have runners-up, and have third place. Since this is a specific recognition and is different from losing an award, runner-up mentions are considered wins in this award tally. For simplification and to avoid errors, each award in this list has been presumed to have had a prior nomination.)
- Wins: 4
- Nominations: 53

New Girl is an American sitcom television series that premiered on Fox on September 20, 2011. Developed by Elizabeth Meriwether under the working title Chicks & Dicks, the series revolves around offbeat teacher Jess (Zooey Deschanel) after her moving into an L.A. loft with three men, Nick (Jake Johnson), Schmidt (Max Greenfield), and Winston (Lamorne Morris); Jess's best friend Cece (Hannah Simone) and old-turned-new loftmate Coach (Damon Wayans, Jr.) also appear regularly.

== Awards and nominations ==
Awards and nominations for New Girl
| Award | Year | Category | Nominee | Result | Ref. |
|---|---|---|---|---|---|
| ADG Excellence in Production Design Awards | 2012 | Episode of a Half Hour Single-Camera Television Series | New Girl | Nominated | |
| ASCAP Film and Television Music Awards | 2013 | Top Television Series | Zooey Deschanel | Won | |
| Critics' Choice Television Awards | 2011 | Most Exciting New Series | New Girl | Won | |
| Critics' Choice Television Awards | 2012 | Best Comedy Series | New Girl | Nominated | |
| Critics' Choice Television Awards | 2012 | Best Actress in a Comedy Series | Zooey Deschanel | Won | |
| Critics' Choice Television Awards | 2012 | Best Supporting Actor in a Comedy Series | Max Greenfield | Nominated | |
| Critics' Choice Television Awards | 2012 | Best Guest Performer in a Comedy Series | Justin Long | Nominated | |
| Critics' Choice Television Awards | 2013 | Best Comedy Series | New Girl | Nominated | |
| Critics' Choice Television Awards | 2013 | Best Actress in a Comedy Series | Zooey Deschanel | Nominated | |
| Critics' Choice Television Awards | 2013 | Best Actor in a Comedy Series | Jake Johnson | Nominated | |
| Critics' Choice Television Awards | 2013 | Best Supporting Actor in a Comedy Series | Max Greenfield | Nominated | |
| Golden Globe Awards | 2012 | Best Television Series – Musical or Comedy | New Girl | Nominated | |
| Golden Globe Awards | 2012 | Best Actress – Television Series Musical or Comedy | Zooey Deschanel | Nominated | |
| Golden Globe Awards | 2013 | Best Actress – Television Series Musical or Comedy | Zooey Deschanel | Nominated | |
| Golden Globe Awards | 2013 | Best Supporting Actor – Series, Miniseries or Television Film | Max Greenfield | Nominated | |
| Golden Globe Awards | 2014 | Best Actress – Television Series Musical or Comedy | Zooey Deschanel | Nominated | |
| National Television Awards | 2013 | Situation Comedy | New Girl | Nominated | |
| People's Choice Awards | 2012 | Favorite New TV Comedy | New Girl | Nominated | |
| People's Choice Awards | 2013 | Favorite Network TV Comedy | New Girl | Nominated | |
| People's Choice Awards | 2013 | Favorite TV Comedy Actress | Zooey Deschanel | Nominated | |
| People's Choice Awards | 2014 | Favorite TV Comedy Actress | Zooey Deschanel | Nominated | |
| People's Choice Awards | 2015 | Favorite Network TV Comedy | New Girl | Nominated | |
| People's Choice Awards | 2015 | Favorite Comedic TV Actress | Zooey Deschanel | Nominated | |
| People's Choice Awards | 2016 | Favorite Network TV Comedy | New Girl | Nominated | |
| People's Choice Awards | 2016 | Favorite Comedic TV Actress | Zooey Deschanel | Nominated | |
| People's Choice Awards | 2017 | Favorite Network TV Comedy | New Girl | Nominated | |
| People's Choice Awards | 2017 | Favorite Comedic TV Actress | Zooey Deschanel | Nominated | |
| Primetime Emmy Awards | 2012 | Outstanding Lead Actress in a Comedy Series | Zooey Deschanel | Nominated | |
| Primetime Emmy Awards | 2012 | Outstanding Supporting Actor in a Comedy Series | Max Greenfield | Nominated | |
| Primetime Emmy Awards | 2012 | Outstanding Directing for a Comedy Series | Jake Kasdan (for "Pilot") | Nominated | |
| Primetime Emmy Awards | 2012 | Outstanding Casting for a Comedy Series | New Girl | Nominated | |
| Primetime Emmy Awards | 2012 | Outstanding Main Title Design | New Girl | Nominated | |
| Satellite Awards | 2011 | Best Actress – Musical or Comedy Series | Zooey Deschanel | Nominated | |
| Satellite Awards | 2014 | Best Actress – Musical or Comedy Series | Zooey Deschanel | Nominated | |
| Satellite Awards | 2014 | Best Actor – Musical or Comedy Series | Jake Johnson | Nominated | |
| Teen Choice Awards | 2012 | Choice TV: Comedy | New Girl | Nominated | |
| Teen Choice Awards | 2012 | Choice TV Actress: Comedy | Zooey Deschanel | Nominated | |
| Teen Choice Awards | 2012 | Choice TV Breakout Show | New Girl | Nominated | |
| Teen Choice Awards | 2012 | Choice TV Breakout Star – Male | Jake Johnson | Nominated | |
| Teen Choice Awards | 2012 | Choice TV Breakout Star – Male | Lamorne Morris | Nominated | |
| Teen Choice Awards | 2012 | Choice TV Breakout Star – Female | Hannah Simone | Won | |
| Teen Choice Awards | 2012 | Choice TV Scene Stealer – Male | Max Greenfield | Nominated | |
| Teen Choice Awards | 2013 | Choice TV: Comedy | New Girl | Nominated | |
| Teen Choice Awards | 2013 | Choice TV Actress: Comedy | Zooey Deschanel | Nominated | |
| Teen Choice Awards | 2013 | Choice TV Actor: Comedy | Jake Johnson | Nominated | |
| Teen Choice Awards | 2013 | Choice TV Scene Stealer – Male | Max Greenfield | Nominated | |
| Teen Choice Awards | 2014 | Choice TV Show: Comedy | New Girl | Nominated | |
| Television Critics Association Awards | 2012 | Outstanding New Program | New Girl | Nominated | |
| Television Critics Association Awards | 2013 | Outstanding Achievement in Comedy | New Girl | Nominated | |
| Television Critics Association Awards | 2013 | Individual Achievement in Comedy | Jake Johnson | Nominated | |
| Writers Guild of America Awards | 2012 | Television: New Series | New Girl | Nominated | |
| Writers Guild of America Awards | 2015 | Television: Episodic Comedy | Rob Rosell (for "Landline") | Nominated | |
| Young Artist Awards | 2012 | Best Performance in a TV Series – Recurring Young Actress | Lauren Owens | Nominated | |
