= Bad Sisters =

2022 Irish television series

- Genre: Black comedy; Thriller
- Based on: Clan by Malin-Sarah Gozin
- Developed by: Sharon Horgan; Dave Finkel; Brett Baer
- Starring: Sharon Horgan; Anne-Marie Duff; Eva Birthistle; Sarah Greene; Eve Hewson; Brian Gleeson; Daryl McCormack; Assaad Bouab; Claes Bang; Owen McDonnell; Thaddea Graham; Barry Ward; Saise Quinn; Michael Smiley; Fiona Shaw
- Opening theme: "Who by Fire" by Leonard Cohen, performed by PJ Harvey
- Country of origin: Ireland
- Original language: English
- No. of series: 2
- No. of episodes: 18

Production
- Executive producers: Sharon Horgan; Dave Finkel; Brett Baer; Faye Dorn; Clelia Mountford; Dearbhla Walsh; Bert Hamelinck; Michael Sagol; Malin-Sarah Gozin
- Running time: 49–58 minutes
- Production companies: Merman; Caviar; 20th Television (Note: Credited as ABC Signature for season 1)

Original release
- Network: Apple TV+
- Release: 19 August 2022 – 24 December 2024

Bad Sisters is an Irish black comedy television series developed by Sharon Horgan, Dave Finkel, and Brett Baer. Set in Dublin and filmed on location in Ireland and England, it is based on the Belgian series Clan, which was created by Malin-Sarah Gozin. The first two episodes aired on Apple TV+ on 19 August 2022. The second series premiered on 13 November 2024.

The first season received a positive reception from critics and won a 2022 Peabody Award. It received a leading twelve nominations at the 19th Irish Film & Television Awards, winning four including Best Drama, and received the British Academy Television Award for Best Drama Series at the 2023 BAFTA Awards alongside two additional wins. Season 1 received four nominations at the 75th Primetime Emmy Awards, including Outstanding Lead Actress in a Drama Series for Horgan.

== Premise ==
The five Garvey sisters—Eva, Grace, Ursula, Bibi, and Becka—live in Dublin. After Grace's abusive, controlling husband John Paul dies unexpectedly, the sisters find themselves at the centre of a life insurance investigation. The series flips between timelines, one before John Paul's death, in which Grace's sisters plot to murder their repulsive brother-in-law and another after his death, in which a determined insurance agent tries to prove the sisters' malicious involvement to save his struggling business.

== Cast ==
=== Main ===
- Sharon Horgan as Eva Garvey, the eldest sister of the Garvey family. Protective of her younger sisters, having taken care of them after their parents' death, she is single, with her infertility having affected her past relationships. She comes into conflict with John Paul over his treatment of her sister Grace and niece Blánaid. Eva and John Paul are co-workers at an architectural firm, and further conflict arises when both apply for the same promotion.
- Anne-Marie Duff as Grace Riley (née Garvey, previously Williams), the second eldest sister of the Garvey family. John Paul's wife and Blánaid's mother, she is controlled and routinely belittled by her husband, from whom she has minimal independence. Her relationship with her sisters becomes distant due to her continual need to defend her husband's poor behavior.
- Eva Birthistle as Ursula Garvey (previously Flynn), the middle sister of the Garvey family. Wife to Donal and mother of three children, one of whom has Down syndrome, she works as a nurse and is having an extramarital affair with her photography instructor Ben. She comes into conflict with John Paul after he discovers her affair, threatens to inform her husband, and tricks her into sending him a nude photo.
- Sarah Greene as Bibi Garvey, second youngest sister of the Garvey family. A lesbian, she is married to Nora and mother to an adopted son. She lost her right eye in a car crash caused by John Paul. She is the impetus for the sisters' decision to murder John Paul.
- Eve Hewson as Becka Garvey, youngest sister of the Garvey family. A massage therapist with aspirations to open her own studio, she comes into conflict with John Paul after he reneges on his agreement to invest in her business. Becka begins a relationship with Matthew Claffin, not realising that he and his half-brother are investigating John Paul's death.
- Brian Gleeson as Thomas ("Tom") Claffin (season 1), insurance agent at Claffin & Sons, which holds John Paul's life insurance policy. Thomas has recently taken over the family business, which his father mismanaged before committing suicide. Knowing that settling the claim will bankrupt the business, he is determined to avoid a payout by proving the Garvey sisters guilty of foul play.
- Daryl McCormack as Matthew "Matt" Claffin, half-brother of Thomas. Formerly a bassist in a London band, Matthew comes to work at Claffin & Sons after his father's death. He begins a relationship with Becka, not realising she is a suspect in his insurance investigation.
- Assaad Bouab as Gabriel (season 1), Eva and John Paul's co-worker. He develops a friendship with Eva, which she mistakes as romantic interest. He reveals to her that he is gay, although not out at work.
- Claes Bang as John Paul "JP" Williams (season 1), Grace's husband, Blánaid's father, and a co-worker of Eva. A manipulative and abusive man, he exerts complete control over his wife and daughter's lives and comes into conflict with the rest of the Garvey sisters. He is recently deceased at the beginning of the series, but the circumstances of his death are uncertain.
- Owen McDonnell as Ian Riley (season 2), Grace's newfound husband at the beginning of the second season.
- Thaddea Graham as Una Houlihan (season 2), a young, persistent, and bright-eyed detective who is tasked to work with Detective Loftus to solve the case tied to John Paul's father's death.
- Barry Ward as Fergal Loftus (season 2; recurring season 1), a Garda inspector.
- Saise Quinn as Blánaid "Bla" Williams (season 2; recurring season 1), Grace and John Paul's 12-year-old daughter.
- Michael Smiley as Roger Muldoon (season 2; recurring season 1), Grace and John Paul's neighbour who leads a local youth church group.
- Fiona Shaw as Angelica Muldoon (season 2), Roger's awkward sister who forged an off-screen bond with Grace, but it ended on a bad note.

=== Recurring ===
- Yasmine Akram as Nora Garvey, Bibi's wife.
- Peter Coonan as Ben (season 1), an artist and photography instructor who is having an affair with Ursula.
- Lloyd Hutchinson as Gerald Fisher (season 1), Eva and John Paul's boss.
- Seána Kerslake as Theresa Claffin (season 1), Thomas's pregnant wife.
- Nina Norén as Minna Williams (season 1), John Paul's mother who has dementia.
- Jonjo O'Neill as Donal Flynn, Ursula's husband who works as a paramedic.
- Peter Claffey as Joe Walsh (season 2), Becka's new love interest.
- Fiona Shaw as Anjelica (season 2), as the cohabitant sister of Roger.

== Episodes ==
Series	Episodes	Originally released	
Series	Episodes	First released	Last released
1	10	19 August 2022	14 October 2022
2	8	13 November 2024	24 December 2024

=== Season 1 (2022) ===
No. overall	No. in season	Title	Directed by	Teleplay by	Original release date
1	1	"The Prick"	Dearbhla Walsh	Sharon Horgan and Dave Finkel & Brett Baer	19 August 2022
In a flashback, the Garvey sisters hold a holiday party at Eva's house, where John Paul insults and angers almost everyone. The next day, he refuses to let Grace meet her sisters at the Forty Foot for the Garvey family's annual Christmas morning swim just because she's had only one drink. The other sisters lament how much Grace has changed due to "the prick" John Paul. When Ursula says John Paul will die eventually of natural causes, Bibi says they could "give nature a helping hand." The sisters jokingly suggest ways to kill their brother-in-law. In the present, the sisters gather for John Paul's funeral. Running late, Becka steps in front of a motorcyclist, Matt, causing him to swerve and crash. Matt and his half-brother Tom, insurance agents for John Paul's life insurance policy, attend the funeral and talk to Grace and her sisters. Matt later meets Becka again at a bar, not realising she is Grace's sister, and she gives him her number. Tom explains to Matt that the family business will go bankrupt if they have to pay out on John Paul's substantial life insurance policy. The Claffin brothers must prove foul play in order to avoid a payout.
2	2	"Explode a Man"	Dearbhla Walsh	Dave Finkel & Brett Baer	19 August 2022
In flashback, Ursula has sex with her photography instructor Ben. Walking through Dublin afterwards, Ursula and Ben meet John Paul, who regards them with suspicion. Eva takes Blánaid shopping in advance of her confirmation ceremony. John Paul later notices a bra in Blánaid's bedroom and confronts Grace about buying inappropriate lingerie for a child. Blánaid reveals she asked her aunt Eva to buy her a bra because she couldn't ask her parents. At the confirmation after-party, John Paul accuses Eva of sexualising and grooming Blánaid, while Grace accuses Eva of stealing her moment by buying her daughter's first bra. John Paul mocks Eva's infertility and calls her a "frigid bitch." Eva and Bibi then plot to blow up John Paul while he is staying at his remote cabin in County Wicklow after a hiking trip. Eva buys concert tickets for Grace and Blánaid to see Lizzo on the same night. When they believe John Paul to be asleep, Eva and Bibi sneak into the cabin, turn on the gas, and light a candle. The cabin soon explodes and they hear John Paul screaming. Unable to sleep due to his painfully blistered feet, he went outside to call Grace and was unharmed. In the present time, Matt and Tom interview Grace and suspect that she is hiding something.
3	3	"Chopped Liver"	Dearbhla Walsh	Sharon Horgan	26 August 2022
In the present, Matt and Tom interview Ursula. In flashback scenes, John Paul spies on Ursula as she emerges from a hotel with Ben and kisses him. John Paul confronts her, threatening to tell her husband Donal unless she ends the affair. When Ursula tells Eva and Bibi, they reveal their murder plot, but Ursula declines to become involved. At the family's Easter gathering, John Paul furtively checks Ursula's phone and finds a sexting exchange with Ben. After changing Ben's number in her phone to his own, he tricks Ursula into sending him a nude photo. He forwards the image and her sexting messages to Donal. Ursula races to the hospital where she and Donal work, retrieves his phone from his locker, and deletes the messages before Donal can read them. After this incident, Ursula commits to Eva and Bibi's plan and acquires poison to make John Paul's death look like cardiac arrest. Eva switches poisoned liver with the liver in Grace's fridge, knowing Grace and Blánaid will be unharmed because only John Paul eats it. However, Grace drops the liver on the floor while preparing dinner and feeds it to their dog. The next morning, Grace tearfully calls Eva to tell her the dog has died. In the present, Becka and Matt go on a date and kiss.
4	4	"Baby Becka"	Josephine Bornebusch	Karen Cogan	2 September 2022
In flashback, Becka pitches her massage therapy business plan to John Paul and is delighted when he agrees to help her. Resenting their neighbour Roger's frequent visits, John Paul joins an online forum for Roger's church group, posing as a 10-year-old boy. Blánaid criticises Grace for having no job or pursuits outside the home, unlike her friends' mothers. Minna shows Becka an old photo album containing pictures of John Paul dressed in his sister's clothes; Becka learns that John Paul used to drown frogs in milk. After Becka puts a non-refundable deposit for a studio rental on her credit card, John Paul sends Grace to tell Becka that he never intended to help her financially. Upset by John Paul's betrayal, Becka talks to Ursula, who tells Becka about her affair and how John Paul tricked her into sending him a nude photo. After John Paul and Grace lose a pub quiz to Eva and Bibi, John Paul publicly castigates Grace. Becka confronts John Paul in the pub toilets about the loan and his harassment of Ursula. After the other sisters learn that John Paul has a nude photo of Ursula, Eva confronts him and breaks his phone. Eva reluctantly agrees that Becka can become involved in their plot to kill John Paul. In the present, Matt and Tom go to meet Becka to inquire about John Paul's death. Becka and Matt are both surprised to see each other.
5	5	"Eye for an Eye"	Josephine Bornebusch	Ailbhe Keogan	9 September 2022
The Garvey sisters are invited to go paintballing for John Paul's birthday. Flashing further back, John Paul drives recklessly to terrify Bibi, knowing her parents died in a car accident. He crashes the car, costing Bibi her right eye and leaving him with a hole in the back of his skull. Bibi, a decorated archer, plots to kill John Paul by shooting frozen paintballs through the soft spot in the back of his head. While she is aiming, Becka pushes her, so she misses John Paul and blinds another man in one eye. She is devastated to have inflicted the same injury on someone else. Eva goes on dates with her coworker Gabriel. They go back to Gabriel's houseboat and kiss, but when Eva moves to undress, Gabriel confesses he is gay. In the present, Matt and Tom interview Bibi, whose wife Nora reveals they both hated John Paul. Tom's wife tells Matt how to access a locked drawer at the Claffin & Sons office, where he discovers his father's suicide note. Having believed his father died of an accidental overdose, Matt angrily punches Tom for concealing this information and the brothers argue. Tom reveals that their father used his clients' insurance premiums to fund his lifestyle, without filing their policies. John Paul's policy, with a death benefit of €875,000, has never been filed.
6	6	"Splash"	Josephine Bornebusch	Daniel Cullen	16 September 2022
John Paul returns home to see Grace dancing in their garden with their single neighbour, Roger. He makes an anonymous complaint that Roger is a paedophile, which leads to Gardai arresting and questioning Roger and seizing his computer. The Garvey sisters come up with a new plan to drug John Paul and have him drown in his bathtub. They sneak into his house and drug his nasal spray; he returns early, which forces them to hide. After he takes the nasal spray, he passes out on his bed. The sisters prepare to move him into the bathtub, when he awakes suddenly. In a drugged state, he urinates in his closet, then gets into his car and drives to the marina. The sisters watch as he gets onto his boat, but falls overboard and seems to drown. In the present, Matt takes a day off to spend time with Becka while Tom investigates John Paul's suicide attempt by questioning Grace.
7	7	"Rest in Peace"	Rebecca Gatward	Perrie Balthazar	23 September 2022
The sisters watch as Gabriel, from his nearby houseboat, dives into the water and rescues John Paul, who later awakens in a hospital under suspicion of trying to commit suicide. He insists that someone is trying to kill him. John Paul returns to work, where he and Eva interview for the same promotion. John Paul tells Gerald about Eva's previous mental health struggles and alcoholism in an attempt to convince him not to give her the promotion. Becka gives a massage to Minna, John Paul's mother, when she mentions the freezer in their basement that John Paul always goes to. After Minna falls asleep, Becka investigates the walk-in freezer, where she finds the frozen corpse of George, John Paul's father, hidden beneath taxidermy specimens. In the present, Thomas convinces Inspector Loftus to approve the exhumation of John Paul's corpse. He tells Matt to stay away from Becka. Matt ignores Becka's calls and stands her up on their date plans.
8	8	"The Cold Truth"	Rebecca Gatward	Paul Howard	30 September 2022
In a flashback, John Paul visits his father George, who is working in his basement taxidermy studio. John Paul asks for a loan of several thousand euros to meet expenses, but his father refuses. George then begins choking on a glass taxidermy eyeball. John Paul considers performing the Heimlich maneuver, but instead lets George die and hides the body in the walk-in freezer. Becka decides to kill John Paul by locking him in the same freezer. At work, John Paul gets the promotion over Eva, which causes Gabriel to confront John Paul. John Paul, who had observed Gabriel on a date with another man, tells Gabriel that Eva had revealed that he is gay. Upset, Gabriel leaves work and tells Eva he does not wish to speak to her. Becka hides in a closet, and when she sees someone go in the freezer, she locks the door. In the present, Inspector Loftus and a Garda team exhume John Paul's body. Matt visits Becka, who tells him she sat home the previous night waiting for him. They then share that they have real feelings for each other and initiate sex, but Matt cannot achieve an erection. When he goes to the kitchen for a glass of water, Becka checks his phone and sees a text from Thomas saying that John Paul's body has been dug up. Becka rushes to the cemetery, where she sees the Garda team around John Paul's grave. She alerts Eva, Ursula, and Bibi, who panic and worry about going to prison. Eva finds out that Becka has been sleeping with Matt Claffin and quarrels with Becka and her other sisters.
9	9	"Going Rogue"	Rebecca Gatward	Sharon Horgan & Ailbhe Keogan	7 October 2022
John Paul arrives at a gathering at Eva's house, and Becka realises that she did not lock him in the freezer. She races to Minna's house, but cannot get in. She sees John Paul delivering Minna her groceries, and John Paul discovers his mother's body in the freezer. He moves Minna to her bed and calls the police to say that she had died in her sleep. He later dumps his father's body in the pond behind their house. Becka is distraught, and believes that she killed Minna. John Paul and Grace go up to their newly-rebuilt cabin and invite the rest of the Garvey sisters to meet up with them the following day. While there, Roger arrives and confronts John Paul, saying that he knows it was him who framed him for paedophilia. Roger says he forgives John Paul and walks away; Grace sees him through the window. The sisters all go their separate ways, and wake up with suspicious circumstances. They go to the cabin the next morning to celebrate Grace's birthday, where they find a crying Grace saying that John Paul is dead.
10	10	"Saving Grace"	Rebecca Gatward	Sharon Horgan	14 October 2022
Grace and John Paul have dinner at the cabin. She attempts to initiate sex with him, but he is unable to have an erection. He blames his erectile dysfunction on a sexual encounter he had with Eva around 10 years ago. He reveals that he raped Eva and impregnated her, but Eva eventually miscarried. Upon hearing this, a furious Grace grabs John Paul's pyjamas and strangles him with it. She goes downstairs and begins knitting; she watches the film Isadora, where Isadora Duncan is killed by her scarf becoming entangled in the axle of her car. She dresses John Paul, and with the help of Roger, puts him on an all-terrain-vehicle, wraps a scarf around his neck and the axle, making it look like that was his cause of death. She admits this to her sisters. Matt, investigating the death, finds the movie and the yarn, and realises how John Paul's death was staged. Becka attempts to commit suicide over guilt in Minna's death, but Eva stops her right before she is to drink pentobarbital. The sisters discuss how Grace killed John Paul, only for Matt to overhear their conversation. The sisters agree to not make a claim on the life insurance policy, and in return, Matt burns the evidence and promises not to reveal to the police what Grace did to John Paul. Grace and Blánaid move in with Eva.

=== Season 2 (2024) ===
No. overall	No. in season	Title	Directed by	Teleplay by	Original release date
11	1	"Good Sisters"	Dearbhla Walsh	Sharon Horgan	13 November 2024
Two years after the death of John Paul, Grace is about to marry Ian, Ursula has divorced, and Bibi and her wife are trying for another child. The wedding festivities are overshadowed by Roger, who is tormented with guilt and harbours unreciprocated feelings for Grace, as well as the arrival of Roger's sister Angelica. The remains of JP's father are discovered in a suitcase submerged in a pond, prompting a renewed police investigation into the Williams family's affairs. Roger tells Grace that he wants to go to the police, causing her to panic. Grace tells Ian about how John Paul died. The next morning, Blánaid runs to Eva's house to tell them that Ian is gone and Grace can't stop crying.
12	2	"Penance"	Dearbhla Walsh	Sharon Horgan	13 November 2024
Grace becomes increasingly distressed following the disappearance of Ian. The discovery of Ian's phone hidden in Grace's bathroom, along with blood stained clothes in the washing machine arouses suspicions. The sisters urge Roger not to go to the police, however Angelica has already learned about the circumstances of John Paul's death. Angelica starts to meddle in the sisters' family affairs, sowing discord between Bibi and her wife. Detective Loftus and Houlihan intensify their investigation into John Paul's death, discovering inconsistencies in Grace's statements. Grace attempts to flee, but is killed in a car crash.
13	3	"Missing"	Stacey Gregg	Karen Cogan	20 November 2024
The sisters are struggling with Grace’s death. Ursula volunteers to identify Grace’s body. The sisters question the wisdom of trying to kill John Paul. Angelica tries to sit with the sisters at Grace’s funeral. Matt Claffin’s appearance draws the attention of a variety of people. Ian returns at the end of the funeral and is questioned by the detectives. Angelica pries into Ursula’s grief, and Ursula reveals that she gave pills to Grace the day Grace dies. Then, Angelica blackmails Ursula to maintain Angelica’s silence regarding the pill revelation. Detectives Loftus and Houlihan continue their investigation. Eva discovers Grace withdrew 20,000 euros in the hours before her death. Ursula tries to cover her theft of the pills, but she is not successful. Grace’s toxicology report comes back clean. Ursula reveals what she told Angelica. Blánaid comes to visit Angelica.
14	4	"Person of Interest"	Stacey Gregg	Malcolm Campbell	27 November 2024
Becka goes to see Matt Claffin’s band, where Detective Houlihan also makes an appearance. Matt says he won’t cover for Becka this time. The sisters confront Angelica about their belief that she blackmailed Grace. They hatch a plan to break into her house while she is at church. Becka and Bibi break into Angelica’s house, but Becka is caught by Angelica while trying to escape and is subsequently arrested by the police. Meanwhile, Blánaid starts a fight at her camogie match after a girl insults her family. During the fight, Molly, Blánaid’s cousin and Ursula’s daughter, has two teeth knocked out. Detective Houlihan discovers the sisters were nearby on the night of John Paul’s death. Eva invites Angelica to her house, where she says she will only drop the charges if the sisters allow her to scatter Grace’s ashes. Becka discovers the police think all the sisters are accessories to John Paul’s murder and reveals to them that Grace withdrew large sums of money the day she died. After she is released from custody, Becka goes to see Matt where they kiss briefly and talk. Joe shows up at Matt’s house as Becka leaves. All three argue and Becka tells Joe she can’t "do this anymore." Becka knows she is pregnant by Joe, although she has only told Eva. Ian demands Angelica leave the Garvey sisters and Blánaid alone.
15	5	"Boom"	Stacey Gregg & Dearbhla Walsh	Ailbhe Keogan	4 December 2024
On her 50th birthday, Eva meets with her menopause coach Eileen. Eileen states Angelica is her new client. The detectives question Eva about the money Grace withdrew. Angelica demands the involvement of Ursula, Bibi, and Becka in the scattering of Grace’s ashes. Eva was not invited. Detective Houlihan drops off Grace’s personal effects and questions Ian further. Ian drops off a gift for Eva. The sisters throw Eva a surprise birthday party. The scattering of Grace’s ashes was a ruse for a Social Services visit to Eva. Blánaid visits Angelica. Angelica arrives late at the boat for ash scattering. Eva panics when she can’t find Blánaid. Detective Loftus breaks into Ian’s house searching for the missing 20,000 euros and finds the money hidden in the turtle house. Blánaid returns home and insults Eva. While comforting Eva, Ian kisses her. After scattering the ashes, Angelica argues with Bibi, Ursula, and Becka about Blánaid and Ian. Angelica is accidentally knocked into the sea, and the sisters cannot retrieve her: Detective Loftus fights for custody of his daughter when she asks her dad to care for her instead of going to Australia with her mom and stepdad.
16	6	"Who by Water"	James Griffiths	Paul Howard	11 December 2024
Angelica’s body is seen floating in the water. Bibi, Ursula, and Becka return to Eva’s house distraught and explain what happened. Unfortunately, Eva told Detective Loftus Angelica was blackmailing Grace about John Paul’s death. That gives the sisters a motive for Angelica’s death. Ian discovers blood on the sailboat, and a camera pointing directly at the sailboat. Ian is able to get the camera footage, and the sisters clean the blood off the boat. Angelica’s purse along with her cellphone was still on the boat. Bibi panics and throws the ringing phone in the harbor. Becka has a pregnancy scare though the baby ends up safe. Detective Loftus considers giving Grace’s 20,000 euros to his divorce attorney for his custody battle. Detective Houlihan believes Grace was being blackmailed by Angelica. Roger comes by Eva’s house asking about Angelica and Ian runs him off. Ian wants to talk about his kiss with Eva. Bibi finds Angelica’s car keys in her purse, but the car is located by the police before Bibi can do anything. Bibi argues with Eva at the Forty Foot about Eva’s relationship with Ian. Loftus and Houlihan disagree about what is truly going on with the Garvey sisters and their involvement in a variety of events. Eva and Ian kiss again and sleep together. Bibi is unsettled by recent events, and her wife is asking questions. Eva accidentally reveals Becka’s pregnancy to Joe. Houlihan reveals she knows about Loftus’ unethical withholding money after his odd behavior in putting the money in an evidence bag and locking it up. Loftus threatens Houlihan’s career if she reports his evidence breach. Bibi questions Ian about who he really is.
17	7	"How to Pick a Prick"	James Griffiths	Sharon Horgan & Perrie Balthazar	18 December 2024
Angelica was found alive and floating in the Irish Sea. Ursula goes to visit Angelica and apologise, but she reacts badly. Angelica remembers nothing after getting on the boat. Detective Houlihan is suspicious of Ursula being at the hospital. Angelica can’t tell the detective anything. Eva discovers Ian has taken all of Blánaid’s money and left town. Eva frantically tries to discover who Ian really is. With the assistance of Joe and Roger, the sisters discover Ian’s real name is Cormac from Tyrone. Eva meets Cormac’s wife who denies she knows Cormac/Ian. Detective Houlihan criticises Loftus on the day of his retirement. She reluctantly goes to Loftus’ retirement party begins a critical speech about him. Once Houlihan sees Loftus’ daughter present, she abruptly ends the speech. Eva discovers Ian picked up Blánaid from school, and they are both at Eva’s house.
18	8	"Cliff Hanger"	James Griffiths	Sharon Horgan	24 December 2024
Blánaid sent off to a friend’s house so Ian and the sisters can confront one another. Ian threatens the sisters that everyone will believe him and not a bunch of "hysterical" women. Blánaid returns and Ursula drives her to meet her cousins in Ian’s car. Ian becomes particularly insulting of Grace and is suddenly whacked on the head by a heavy object leaving him bleeding heavily. Angelica perpetrated the attack. She is left dazed and confused. Houlihan sees Ursula driving Ian’s car. Ian is believed to be dead. Houlihan appears at Eva’s house while the sisters are panicking about what to do. Houlihan learns that Ian is really Cormac, a disgraced former police officer and abuser, and wants to arrest him. Her boss strongly discourages her from going after a police officer. Houlihan struggles with this reality. Her mother tells her she has always done what is "right". The sisters are going to dump Ian’s body at a cliff while Angelica is told to return Ian’s car to his house. Chaos ensues. Ian is not really dead but stumbles out of Bibi’s car trunk and ends up falling off the cliff anyway. He is still alive. An ambulance is called, and the sisters flee the scene. Angelica is discovered by Houlihan and taken into custody. Angelica reveals the circumstances surrounding Ian. Houlihan reveals to the sisters she knows Ian is a dangerous man. The sisters ask Houlihan to help them. Houlihan visits Ian/Cormac and he threatens Houlihan when she suggests he will be charged. Detective Loftus comes into Ian’s room and says he will do anything to harm Ian. Loftus tells Ian to give back Blánaid’s money and leave the Garvey sisters alone. The sisters, their significant others, and Blánaid give Grace a tearful farewell at the coast.

== Production ==
=== Development ===
In September 2021, it was officially announced Sharon Horgan would co-write, produce and star in a series for Apple TV+ developed by her production company Merman. The series, which had a working title of Emerald, was an adaptation of the Belgian series Clan. Malin-Sarah Gozin, the creator of Clan, joined the project as an executive producer alongside Bert Hamelinck and Michael Sagol for the Belgian Caviar Films. Other producers were Faye Dorn and Clelia Mountford for Merman as well as Brett Baer and Dave Finkel. The series was created as part of Horgan's Apple TV+ deal.

=== Casting ===
The cast was initially believed to include Assaad Bouab, Eve Hewson, and Brian Gleeson in early reports. The cast was later confirmed in March 2022, with Anne-Marie Duff, Eva Birthistle, and Sarah Greene, and Hewson set to star alongside Horgan. Claes Bang, Brian Gleeson, Daryl McCormack, Bouab, and Saise Quinn complete the ensemble.

=== Filming ===
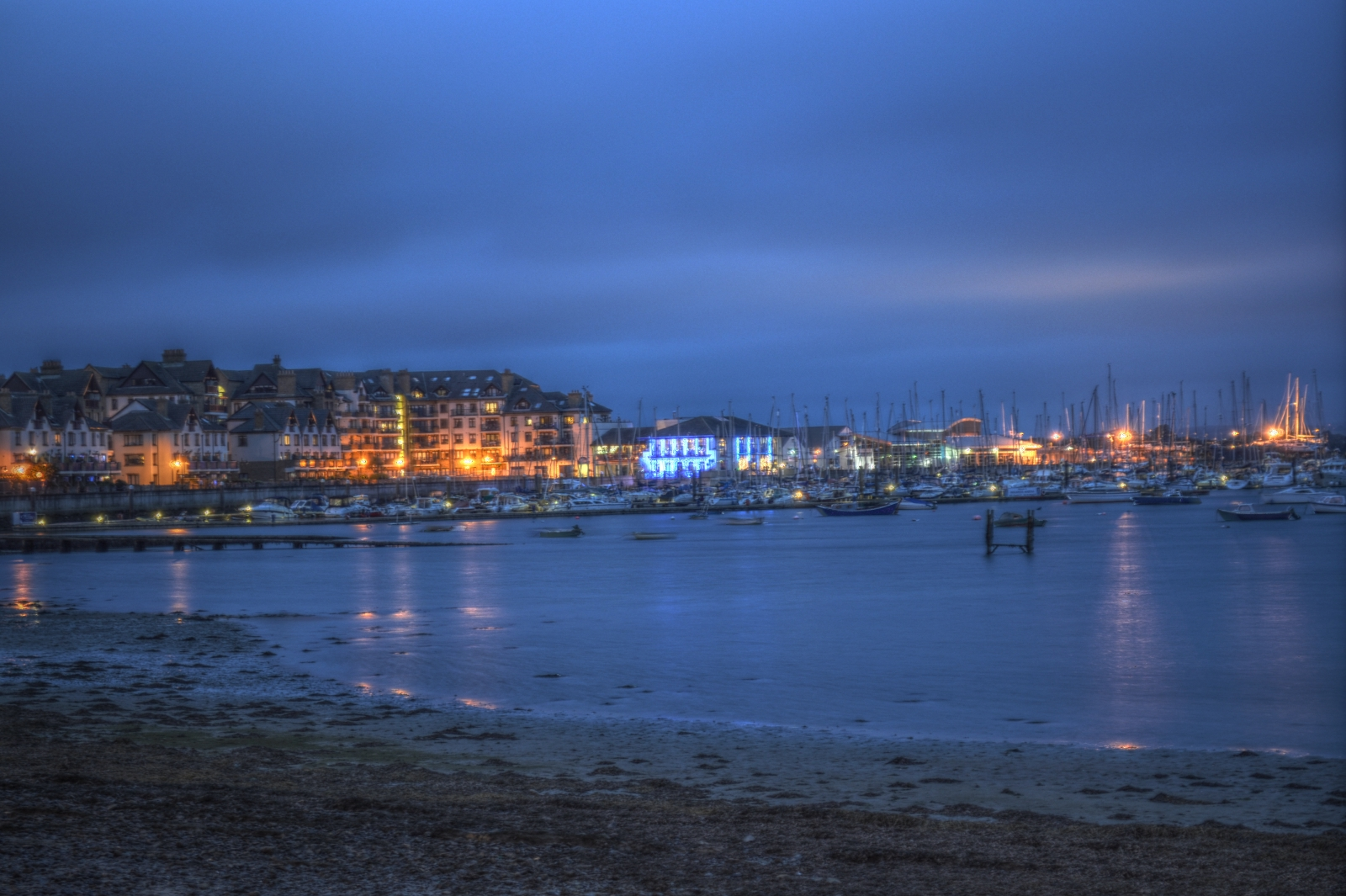
Malahide Marina Village, site of Becka's massage business, and where Becka and Matt frequently met.

Principal photography for the first season took place in 2021. Cast and crew were reported filming in and around Dublin at locations such as Sandycove, the Forty Foot, Howth, and Malahide in August. They would also film in Belfast. Filming locations included County Dublin and County Wicklow in the Republic of Ireland, County Antrim in Northern Ireland (notably Glenarm marina and nearby Antrim Coast Road as well as St John the Evangelist, the Roman Catholic church in Carnlough) and England.

=== Title sequence ===
The title sequence depicts a physical Rube Goldberg style machine made from dangerous objects and props from the show that foreshadow narrative elements in the main storyline. The sequence was mostly hand-made, designed and made by Peter Anderson Studio. The theme music is a cover of Leonard Cohen's "Who by Fire" performed by PJ Harvey.

== Release ==
The first two episodes of Bad Sisters aired on 19 August 2022 on Apple TV+.

Apple TV+ renewed the series for a second season on 8 November 2022, and started releasing episodes on 13 November 2024.

== Reception ==
=== Critical response ===
Critical response of Bad Sisters
Season	Rotten Tomatoes	Metacritic
1	100% (62 reviews)	79% (22 reviews)
2	77% (39 reviews)	72% (17 reviews)

==== Season 1 ====
The review aggregator website Rotten Tomatoes reported a 100% approval rating with an average rating of 8.3/10 for the first season, based on 62 critic reviews. The website's critics consensus reads, "Dark secrets are a family affair in Bad Sisters, a riotously funny murder mystery that makes fine use of its gifted ensemble while exemplifying creator and star Sharon Horgan's penchant for salty warmth." Metacritic, which uses a weighted average, assigned a score of 79 out of 100 based on 22 critics, indicating "generally favourable reviews".

IndieWire graded it B and says: "Aside from a few minor red herrings, "Bad Sisters" sets a trajectory and sticks to it for much of the run. As a dramedy of errors, "Bad Sisters" doesn't always feel like the freshest or most elegant execution. But as a family showcase, the engine is there to power this show through an ordeal of any length." The Hollywood Reporter called it "Fun but Empty" and said: "...it's a bit of an oddity — easy to breeze through but a little too mordant to be sincere, a little too heavy to be hilarious, a little too sour to be purely fun." The Atlantic called it "a semi-comic murder caper" and said: "The setup of Bad Sisters is deliberately absurd, a throwback to sillier shows such as Desperate Housewives and Why Women Kill. The ease with which the Garvey sisters decide to kill John Paul, and their resoluteness when their attempts repeatedly and catastrophically fail, are pure fantasy." Variety said: "Bad Sisters is less about the mystery than its cutting, empathetic take on all the relationships that tangled into such an overwhelming knot along the way."

==== Season 2 ====
For the second season the review aggregator website Rotten Tomatoes reported a 77% approval rating with an average rating of 7.0/10, based on 39 critic reviews. The website's critics consensus reads, "The return of Bad Sisters can't help but feel like too much of a good thing, but the lived-in dynamic between these outstanding performers continues to pay highly watchable dividends." Metacritic, which uses a weighted average, assigned a score of 72 out of 100 based on 17 critics, indicating "generally favourable reviews".

=== Accolades ===
Year	Award	Category	Nominee(s)	Result	Ref.
2023	Peabody Award	Entertainment	Bad Sisters	Won	
2023	Critics' Choice Television Awards	Best Drama Series	Bad Sisters	Nominated	
2023	Critics' Choice Television Awards	Best Actress in a Drama Series	Sharon Horgan	Nominated	
2023	Writers Guild of America Awards	New Series	Brett Baer, Dave Finkel, and Sharon Horgan	Nominated	
2023	Writers Guild of America Awards	Episodic Drama	Sharon Horgan, Dave Finkel, and Brett Baer (for "The Prick")	Nominated	
2023	Royal Television Society Programme Awards	Writer – Drama	Sharon Horgan	Nominated	
2023	British Academy Television Awards	Best Drama Series	Sharon Horgan, Dearbhla Walsh, Faye Dorn, Brett Baer, Dave Finkel, Johann Knobel	Won	
2023	British Academy Television Awards	Best Supporting Actress	Anne-Marie Duff	Won	
2023	British Academy Television Craft Awards	Best Director: Fiction	Dearbhla Walsh	Nominated	
2023	British Academy Television Craft Awards	Best Scripted Casting	Nina Gold, Lucy Amos	Nominated	
2023	British Academy Television Craft Awards	Best Titles & Graphic Identity	Peter Anderson Studio	Won	
2023	Hollywood Critics Association TV Awards	Best Streaming Series, Drama	Bad Sisters	Nominated	
2023	Hollywood Critics Association TV Awards	Best Actress in a Streaming Series, Drama	Sharon Horgan	Nominated	
2023	Hollywood Critics Association TV Awards	Best Supporting Actress in a Streaming Series, Drama	Anne-Marie Duff	Nominated	
2023	Hollywood Critics Association TV Awards	Best Supporting Actress in a Streaming Series, Drama	Eve Hewson	Nominated	
2023	Hollywood Critics Association Creative Arts TV Awards	Best Casting in a Drama Series	Bad Sisters	Nominated	
2023	Irish Film & Television Awards	Television Drama	Bad Sisters	Won	
2023	Irish Film & Television Awards	Director – Television Drama	Dearbhla Walsh	Won	
2023	Irish Film & Television Awards	Script – Television Drama	Sharon Horgan	Nominated	
2023	Irish Film & Television Awards	Actress – Television Drama	Sharon Horgan	Won	
2023	Irish Film & Television Awards	Supporting Actor – Television Drama	Brian Gleeson	Nominated	
2023	Irish Film & Television Awards	Supporting Actor – Television Drama	Daryl McCormack	Nominated	
2023	Irish Film & Television Awards	Supporting Actor – Television Drama	Michael Smiley	Nominated	
2023	Irish Film & Television Awards	Supporting Actress – Television Drama	Eva Birthistle	Nominated	
2023	Irish Film & Television Awards	Supporting Actress – Television Drama	Anne-Marie Duff	Won	
2023	Irish Film & Television Awards	Supporting Actress – Television Drama	Eve Hewson	Nominated	
2023	Irish Film & Television Awards	Supporting Actress – Television Drama	Sarah Greene	Nominated	
2023	Irish Film & Television Awards	Production Design	Mark Geraghty	Nominated	
2023	Ivor Novello Awards	Best Television Soundtrack	PJ Harvey and Tim Phillips	Nominated	
2024	Artios Awards	Outstanding Achievement in Casting – Television Drama Pilot or First Season	Nina Gold	Nominated	
2024	Primetime Emmy Awards	Outstanding Lead Actress in a Drama Series	Sharon Horgan	Nominated	
2024	Primetime Emmy Awards	Outstanding Directing for a Drama Series	Dearbhla Walsh (for "The Prick")	Nominated	
2024	Primetime Emmy Awards	Outstanding Writing for a Drama Series	Sharon Horgan, Dave Finkel and Brett Baer ("The Prick")	Nominated	
2024	Primetime Creative Arts Emmy Awards	Outstanding Casting for a Drama Series	Nina Gold and Lucy Amos	Nominated	
2025	Critics' Choice Television Awards	Best Supporting Actress in a Drama Series	Fiona Shaw	Nominated	
2025	British Academy Television Craft Awards	Best Original Music - Fiction	Tim Phillips and PJ Harvey	Won	
2025	Primetime Emmy Awards	Outstanding Lead Actress in a Drama Series	Sharon Horgan	Nominated	
