= New Girl =

American television sitcom (2011–2018)

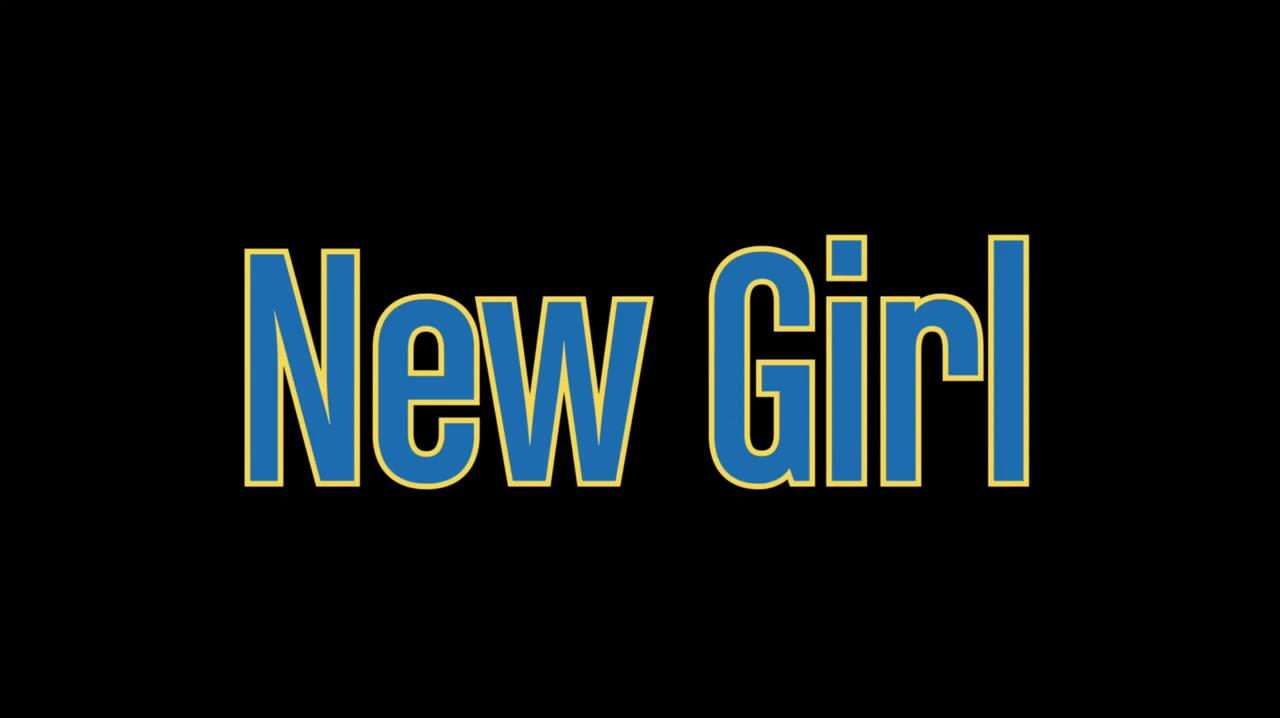
- Title card variant from seasons 5–7
- Genre: Sitcom; Romantic comedy
- Created by: Elizabeth Meriwether
- Showrunner: Elizabeth Meriwether
- Starring: Zooey Deschanel; Jake Johnson; Max Greenfield; Lamorne Morris; Hannah Simone; Damon Wayans Jr.; Danielle Rockoff; Rhiannon Rockoff
- Theme music composer: Michael Andrews; Zooey Deschanel; Elizabeth Meriwether; Dave Finkel; Brett Baer
- Opening theme: "Hey Girl" by Zooey Deschanel (seasons 1–3); "Hey Girl" (instrumental) (seasons 4–7)
- Composer: Ludwig Göransson
- Country of origin: United States
- Original language: English
- No. of seasons: 7
- No. of episodes: 146 (list of episodes)

Production
- Executive producers: Elizabeth Meriwether; Jake Kasdan; Peter Chernin; Katherine Pope; Dave Finkel; Brett Baer
- Producers: Zooey Deschanel; Erin O'Malley; Pavun Shetty; Luvh Rakhe; Dana Fox; David Iserson; Ryan Koh; Megan Mascena Gaspar; Rachel Axler; Alex Cuthbertson; Matt Fusfeld; Kim Rosenstock; Bari Halle (pilot); Josh Malmuth; Ryan Janata; Ryan Guellow
- Camera setup: Film; single-camera
- Running time: 21–24 minutes
- Production companies: Elizabeth Meriwether Pictures (Note: Credited as Meriwether Productions for the first three episodes.); American Nitwits; Chernin Entertainment; 20th Century Fox Television

Original release
- Network: Fox
- Release: September 20, 2011 – May 15, 2018

New Girl is an American television sitcom created by Elizabeth Meriwether and produced by 20th Century Fox Television for Fox that aired from September 20, 2011, to May 15, 2018. The series revolves around quirky teacher Jessica Day (Zooey Deschanel) after she moves into a Los Angeles loft with three men, Nick Miller (Jake Johnson), Schmidt (Max Greenfield), and Winston Bishop (Lamorne Morris), often along with Jess's best friend Cece Parikh (Hannah Simone). Former roommate Coach (Damon Wayans Jr.) later joins the characters. The show combines comedy and drama elements as the characters, who are in their late 20s and early 30s, mostly revolve around relationship issues and career choices. New Girl is a joint production between Elizabeth Meriwether Pictures and 20th Century Fox Television and is syndicated by 20th Television.

Produced in Los Angeles as a single-camera comedy, New Girl is an ensemble show aimed at a general audience, mainly teenagers or adults. New Girl received acclaim from critics and was named one of the best new comedies of the 2011 fall season. The pilot episode drew 10.28 million U.S. viewers and a 4.8 adults 18–49 demo rating, making it the highest-rated fall debut for a Fox scripted show since 2001. Particular praise has been given to the performances of Deschanel, Johnson, Greenfield, Morris, and Simone. The show has garnered increased mainstream viewership following its inclusion on Netflix, becoming one of the most popular shows on the platform. The series concluded its seven-season run in May 2018.

== Plot ==
Jessica Day (Zooey Deschanel), a bubbly and quirky teacher, comes home from vacation to find her boyfriend, Spencer (Ian Wolterstorff), with another woman, and leaves him immediately to look for somewhere else to live. After Jess answers an ad for a new roommate on Craigslist, she moves into a loft in Los Angeles with three men around her own age: Nick, Schmidt, and Coach. After the pilot episode, Winston, a former roommate and Nick's childhood friend, replaces Coach, who leaves the apartment to live with his girlfriend. Jess's childhood best friend, Cece, is a fashion model who frequently visits Jess and the guys.

The series follows the group's interactions with each other as they become closer friends and develop romantic relationships. Midway through season 1, Schmidt and Cece become involved in a mostly sexual relationship but break up at the end of the season. In Season 2, Jess is laid off from her teaching job; she and the others get involved in mostly temporary relationships however, Cece enters an arranged marriage engagement with Shivrang (Satya Bhabha) that is broken up at their wedding in the season 2 finale when Cece realizes she loves Schmidt. Schmidt had recently started dating his old college girlfriend, Elizabeth, and had to choose between Elizabeth and Cece. Meanwhile, Nick and Jess develop feelings and start dating at Cece's wedding, making their relationship official at the end of season 2, and it lasts through most of season 3 until they realize that ultimately, they want different things in life.

Coach returns to the loft in season 3, revealing that he had broken up with his girlfriend and rejoins the gang, and even has a short fling with Cece, which did not last, after ending the short relationship with Schmidt. He stays through season 4 until he moves out to be with another girl, May (Meaghan Rath), and moves to New York. At the end of season 4, Schmidt proposes to Cece, and they marry at the end of season 5. Meanwhile, after bouncing around several random jobs and several dating choices throughout the series, Winston works to become a police officer with the LAPD, and falls in love with his partner Aly (Nasim Pedrad). At the beginning of season 5, Jess is called away to jury duty, resulting in the group bringing in a temporary roommate Reagan Lucas (Megan Fox), who becomes Nick's love interest for the rest of the season. Shortly after returning from jury duty, Jess realizes that she loves Nick and wants to be with him.

At the end of season 6, Nick and Reagan break up and shortly after, Nick and Jess get together, Cece and Schmidt are pregnant, and Winston is engaged to Aly and is trying to meet his father. Season 7 advances the storyline three years later where Schmidt and Cece have a three-year-old daughter named Ruth, Winston and Aly are expecting their first baby, and Nick proposes to Jess. The story advances further to a timeline where Nick and Jess have a child.

== Cast and characters ==
- Zooey Deschanel as Jessica Day: a bubbly, offbeat teacher in her early thirties who is originally from Portland, Oregon. In the premiere episode, she moves into the guys' apartment, where Nick, Schmidt, and Winston help her move on from a painful break-up with her boyfriend, Spencer. She later dates Nick on and off, eventually becoming engaged in the final season. Jess was not specifically written for Zooey Deschanel, but the producers found her a great match for the character. Deschanel became a producer on New Girl and helped build Jess's character, specifically concentrating on not making her the classic wife character being ignored by the men and trying to keep out of trouble.
- Jake Johnson as Nick Miller: Jess's roommate who works as a bartender at a nearby bar. At the start of the series, he struggles with a breakup with his long-term girlfriend, Caroline. He and Jess have an on-and-off relationship but ultimately end up together.
- Max Greenfield as Schmidt: Jess's roommate, a seemingly confident ladies' man. He is a successful marketing associate in a female-dominated office. Schmidt dates Cece in the earlier seasons, but this ends after he cheats on her. However, they later reconcile, marry, and have a child, Ruth.
- Lamorne Morris as Winston Bishop: a former basketball player and Nick's childhood friend from Chicago. Returns to the loft after playing for the Latvian Basketball League, in the second episode. He later becomes a cop and meets his wife on the force. He is very close to his cat, Furguson, and sometimes is mocked for this.
- Hannah Simone as Cece Parikh: a fashion model and Jess's best friend since childhood. In spite of their differences, Cece is a very loyal and protective friend to Jess. Initially skeptical of Jess's new roommates, Cece becomes interested in Schmidt and integrates herself more and more socially with the others as time progresses.
- Damon Wayans Jr. as Coach (pilot, season 4; special guest seasons 3 & 5–7): a cocky and driven former athlete who works as a personal trainer. He appears briefly in the "Pilot" episode as a roommate but leaves in the second episode. After a break-up with his girlfriend, Coach returns to the loft two years later and reintegrates himself back into the lives of his former roommates, becoming a coach at the middle school Jess teaches at.
- Danielle and Rhiannon Rockoff as Ruth Parikh-Schmidt (season 7): Schmidt and Cece's three-year-old daughter.

== Production ==
=== Development ===
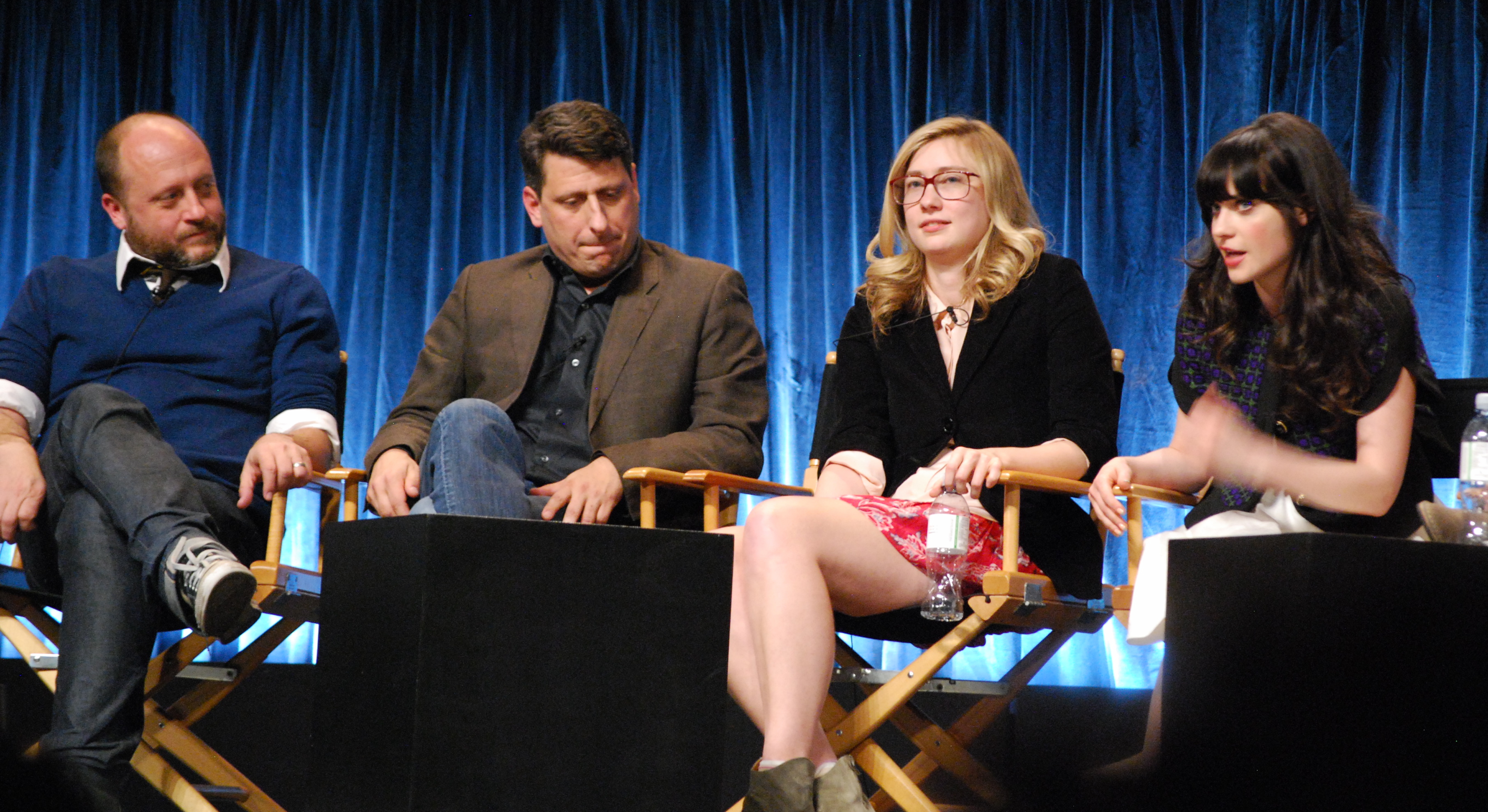
Executive producers Dave Finkel, Brett Baer, Elizabeth Meriwether and producer/actress Zooey Deschanel at Paley Fest 2012.

20th Century Fox Television first approached playwright Elizabeth Meriwether in 2008 to develop a pilot that was eventually shelved. After Meriwether's success with the 2011 romantic comedy film No Strings Attached, 20th Century Fox approached her once more, and she pitched an idea for a TV sitcom about an "offbeat girl moving in with three single guys", inspired by her experience of "bouncing from Craigslist sublet to Craigslist sublet, for four years in L.A." when she was in her twenties. This show was initially called Chicks and Dicks with two of the characters similar to the final characters of Jess and Schmidt. The initial idea was a Will & Grace-style comedy inspired by Meriwether's close friendship with a guy after their exes started dating each other. The Fox network liked the script and pursued Zooey Deschanel for the role of Jess, to whose story Meriwether felt most connected. As the script developed, the plot moved on from being about the sexual endeavors of the roommates and became more socially oriented, so the title was changed to New Girl.

The show attempts to combine "comedy and drama as the five characters explore the difficulties of the decade between 30 and 40, which is when many people take their biggest steps toward maturity" with regard to relationships and careers, which, unlike Friends, is giving the show a "built-in biological clock". Producer Jake Kasdan said that "Their lives are moving forward, [but] they're still trying to hang on to some kind of crazy youth" although he does not "want them ever to seem pathetic."

On April 9, 2012, New Girl was officially renewed for a second season of 24 episodes; Fox ordered one more episode during the second half of the season.

=== Casting ===
Movie actress and singer-songwriter Zooey Deschanel was in the process of developing an HBO show when she read the New Girl pilot script and responded to the material. The character of Jess was not specifically written for Deschanel, but the producers found it a great match and adjusted it to better fit the actress. With the support from Fox, Meriwether wanted to make Jess a unique, interesting and funny female character that would have been the side character on other shows. Deschanel became a producer on the show and helped build the character, requesting to not play the classic wife character who would be ignored by the guys she tries to keep out of trouble. Meriwether's goal was to write about herself from an honest perspective, with Jess mirroring her at the start and later Deschanel until Jess turned into a "hybrid of me and Zooey, the writers, and the editor". Deschanel described Jess as a part of her, especially with regard to "the sort of enthusiasm and optimism" of her youth. She does not shy away from playing embarrassing scenes or being unattractive. As Kasdan said, "This show advocates for the attractive dork." Although Meriwether had always imagined the show as an ensemble show, Fox would later focus its first marketing push on Zooey Deschanel and gave the show the promotional tagline "Simply Adorkable." The show's tone evolved after critiques of Jess’s "adorkable" persona. Creator Elizabeth Meriwether addressed these concerns with episodes like "Jess and Julia," which depicted Jess defending her quirky identity, deepening the character's development and the show's humor.

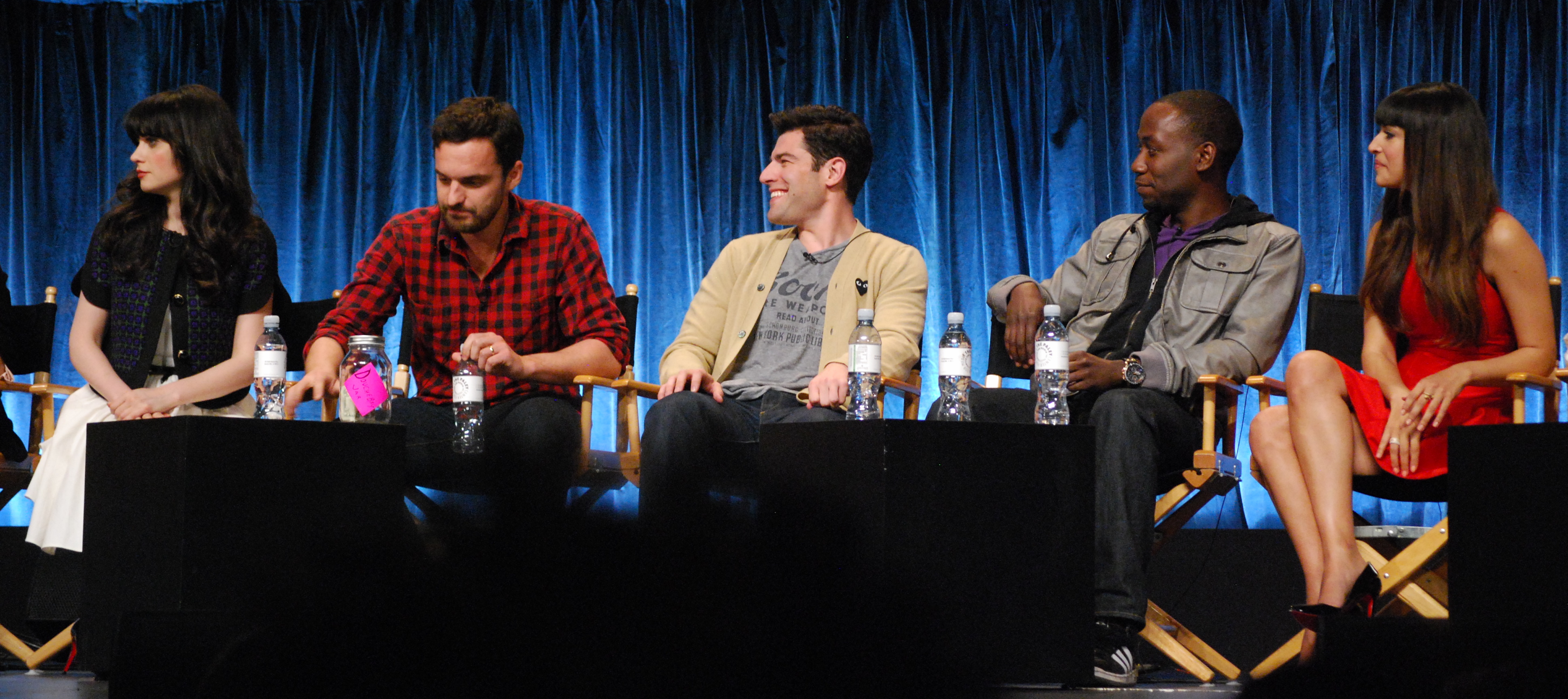
The show's main cast: Zooey Deschanel (Jess), Jake Johnson (Nick), Max Greenfield (Schmidt), Lamorne Morris (Winston), and Hannah Simone (Cece) at Paley Fest 2012.

Basing Nick Miller on a friend also surnamed Miller, she originally imagined Nick as the smartest one of the group who doesn't need to say that and thought of him as "the everyman one, who's stepping away and commenting on what all the crazy people are doing around him." She sent the New Girl pilot script to movie actor Jake Johnson, with whom she had enjoyed working on No Strings Attached and guided him through the audition process. Johnson auditioned with Max Greenfield, who impressed the producers in his first audition as Schmidt. The actors auditioning for Schmidt were more varied in appearance than those auditioning for Nick, and Johnson and Greenfield were initially worried that they looked too much alike. However, both men were cast the same day.

Meriwether originally envisioned Coach as "a fat Jewish guy, like a manchild" and later as "this dumb jock [with] crazy rage problems". David Neher (who would play Schmidt's so-called "fremesis," Benjamin, in four episodes) was among the 400 actors auditioning for Coach before the producers settled on Damon Wayans Jr. who was expecting his show, the ABC sitcom Happy Endings, to be cancelled. When that show was renewed for a second season, Wayans' spot was replaced with Lamorne Morris, who had also read for Coach but had been unavailable for filming the pilot. Meriwether estimated that about 80 percent of the pilot would have needed to be re-shot in order to remove Wayans from the episode, since he was in one of the leading roles of the show. As the producers also liked reflecting the frequent apartment changes in young people's lives, Meriwether, 20th Century Fox and the studio decided to keep the characters and the plot of the pilot episode as they were. Morris joined the show in the second episode of the series when the producers had already broken seven episodes without knowing what the actor was going to be able to do. Wayans returned to New Girl in season 3 for a season-long arc after Happy Endings had been cancelled, and was officially added as a regular for season 4.

=== Writing ===
New Girl had 11 writers during its first season and 15 during the second season—including Elizabeth Meriwether, Brett Baer, and Dave Finkel. Stories were developed in a collaborative effort and aimed at viewers of any gender. Writers intended to keep actors and audiences on their toes by planning very few story arcs and focusing on setting up characters in the first couple seasons .

The writers challenged themselves to create new stories and change the show's dynamics to keep things fresh, while aiming to be "as emotionally real as possible." The humor in the show often comes from characters breaking normal conversation rules, such as saying things that are too much, not enough, or off-topic. This leads to comedic misunderstandings or over-the-top reactions. As the show's jokes rely on the actors' performance instead of perfectly constructed punch lines, Meriwether looked for the actors' strengths before writing. The A story generally revolved around Jess and had an emotional core. Still, Meriwether saw the show as an ensemble about friendship with "everybody having their own stories and people being interested in all of the characters."

Each New Girl episode started out as a pitch page, went through stages of an outline and a final draft before being filmed and edited, a process which could take weeks. The writers were broken up to rework drafts until they found the funniest and most emotionally resonant version. All characters were aimed to be tied into the story, and determining their motivation was the major goal so that people would laugh. During the first season, Meriwether usually made a final pass at the draft alone because of her film and theater background. The actors' performance influenced new story ideas with the actors also handing in story ideas.

=== Filming and editing ===
The main set built for the pilot was to represent a factory-turned-loft in downtown Los Angeles. It was reused once the show was given a full season. The apartment building exterior is the Binford Building, located at 837 Traction Avenue in the city's Arts District, with interior shots done in a studio set. The exterior shots for the bar where Nick works is of The Griffin (now The High Low), located in Atwater Village. The interior shots of the bar are originally from a restaurant called The Prince in Koreatown, and were recreated in a studio set after the first season.

As a single-camera comedy, New Girl is neither performed in front of a studio audience nor has a laugh track. Some scenes are cross-covered (i.e. are filmed with a shooting camera on each person at the same time), to allow for better improvisations. Handheld cameras are avoided for a more filmic look.

The actors first perform scenes as written, then act out the alternatives or improvise, to later allow the producers and editors to choose the gags that ultimately work best. Morris estimated that 20 percent of each episode is improvised.

=== True American ===
True American is a fictional, convoluted drinking game that the New Girl characters first played in the season 1 episode 20, "Normal". After "Normal" aired, internet sources began to summarize the rules for True American, which the characters described as a mix of a drinking game and Candy Land where the floor is lava; it also involves shouting the names of American presidents. The idea of True American came from a New Girl writer who played a similar game in college. As she could not remember the game's exact rules, the writers focused on making the game as funny on the page as possible, but only established chanting "JFK! FDR!" and walking on chairs. Throughout the series, the writers created new rules on the spot in order to keep the actors improvising and encouraged them to "have fun, dig in, jump in".

The game's second appearance in season 2's "Cooler" was played with the strip-poker version called "Clinton Rules", but the exact rules remain unclear even to the actors. True American with updated rules and the resulting hangover were featured in season 3's "Mars Landing". The writers started to do new True American episodes once each year without ever giving explicit rules for the game. Liz Meriwether said the game would not be easier to comprehend in later appearances, as the writers' goal is to actually make it harder to understand. In the final episode, a children's version of True American is shown.

=== Relationships ===
Creator Elizabeth Meriwether sees Nick, Schmidt and Winston "on the weirder side of things". The producers started learning more about the characters by seeing the actors' work and that "We probably rely on them more than we should" to define the characters. Each of the actors improvisations allowed for the characters to switch traits around in the first season before solidifying their characters. Producers found more variety in Nick's character in season 1 and enjoyed Johnson's improvisations, so they relayed Coach's previous attributed rage issues to Nick. Nick's character connects the most with the other roommates, childhood friends with Winston and college roommates with Schmidt, allowing him to be more involved in their stories.

Writers developed the Nick–Winston dynamic in season 1 and sought to figure out Winston's relationship with the other loft mates in season 2. The writers noticed late during the first season that Morris seemed better suited to play a smart character and act as the loft's voice of reason, although Meriwether found that when Winston "finally does blow up, he's crazier than all of them" and that he works better "in these kind of crazy, comedic runners, small pieces of the episode" that contrast the relationship dramas of the other main characters. The Winston–Schmidt friendship was developed significantly in the second half of season 2 when the story focus moved to Nick and Jess. The Nick–Jess relationship affects the three guys' friendship as Nick starts being more considerate of Jess' feelings regarding shenanigans. Damon Wayans Jr. was planned to reprise his role as Coach in at least four episodes in the third season, according to Meriwether "at a time when the roommates are at odds with each other".

With Meriwether's openness regarding straight and gay communities, New Girl also plays with the guys' sexual orientation for humor. One of Winston's recurring alternate persona is Nick's gay lover "Theodore K. Mullins", which started out as an improv of Morris. Johnson thought that Nick and Schmidt had "a pretty funny bromance" with "their own little weird will-they-won't-they". Greenfield improvised kissing Nick a lot in season 1 until the writers started putting Schmidt–Nick kisses into the script, so that they shared more kisses than Nick and Jess did in the first two seasons.

== Episodes ==
| Season | Episodes | Originally released | | Rank | Viewers (in millions) |
| Season | Episodes | First released | Last released | Rank | Viewers (in millions) |
|---|---|---|---|---|---|
| 1 | 24 | September 20, 2011 | May 8, 2012 | 61 | 8.22 |
| 2 | 25 | September 25, 2012 | May 14, 2013 | 77 | 5.85 |
| 3 | 23 | September 17, 2013 | May 6, 2014 | 103 | 4.61 |
| 4 | 22 | September 16, 2014 | May 5, 2015 | 138 | 3.42 |
| 5 | 22 | January 5, 2016 | May 10, 2016 | 125 | 3.69 |
| 6 | 22 | September 20, 2016 | April 4, 2017 | 133 | 2.93 |
| 7 | 8 | April 10, 2018 | May 15, 2018 | 171 | 2.18 |

== Release ==
=== Broadcast ===
The New Girl pilot was released via on-demand, iTunes, and TiVo on September 6, 2011 before its September 20 premiere on Fox in the United States and on City in Canada. Other international broadcasters include Channel 4 and E4 in the United Kingdom, RTÉ2 in the Republic of Ireland, Network Ten and Eleven in Australia, and Four in New Zealand.

=== Syndication and streaming ===
New Girl was added to TBS in 2015 and was removed in 2022. Additionally, the sitcom was added to MTV in 2015 and was removed in 2016. After 10 years on Netflix, the show became exclusively available on Hulu and Peacock since April 17, 2023.

=== Home media ===
| Season | Episodes | DVD release date | | | |
| Season | Episodes | Region 1 | Region 2 | Region 3 | Region 4 |
|---|---|---|---|---|---|
| Season 1 (2011–12) | 24 | October 2, 2012 | December 3, 2012 | November 2, 2012 | October 10, 2012 |
| Season 2 (2012–13) | 25 | October 1, 2013 | September 27, 2013 | December 13, 2013 | November 9, 2013 |
| Season 3 (2013–14) | 23 | September 2, 2014 | October 3, 2014 | September 8, 2014 | December 3, 2014 |
| Season 4 (2014–15) | 22 | September 1, 2015 | November 16, 2015 | TBA | May 4, 2016 |
| Season 5 (2016) | 22 | September 20, 2016 | TBA | TBA | TBA |
| Season 6 (2016–17) | 22 | June 5, 2018 | TBA | TBA | TBA |
| Season 7 (2018) | 8 | July 3, 2018 | TBA | TBA | TBA |

=== Tie-ins ===
- A 2012 book, The Douche Journals: The Definitive Account of One Man's Genius, compiled the many Schmidtisms from The Douchebag Jar, before Jess moved into the apartment. ISBN 9780062238672
- in January 2022, iHeartRadio launched the New Girl rewatch podcast Welcome to Our Show, hosted by Deschanel, Simone, and Morris, who reminisce on their experience filming the show and provide behind the scenes details on its production. In July 2024, the podcast was relaunched as The Mess Around with Hannah and Lamorne with Deschanel no longer a regular on the show.

== Reception ==
=== Ratings ===
The pilot episode drew 10.28 million U.S. viewers and a 4.8 adults 18–49 demo rating, making it the highest-rated fall debut for a Fox scripted show since The Bernie Mac Show in 2001. The second episode made New Girl the top-rated show on television in the marketing-important 18–49 demographic, improved the rating of its lead-in hit series Glee and beat the long-running hit series NCIS and Dancing with the Stars. At this time, Fox ordered 11 additional episodes to the initial 13-episode order, bringing the first season to 24 episodes.

The ratings dropped when the show took a break for baseball, falling almost 30 percent to a 2.1 rating in the 18–49 audience group. During the 2011–12 television season, New Girl averaged 8.22 million viewers and a 4.2 adults 18–49 demo rating. In 18–49 demo, it ranked as the fifth highest rated show on Fox and 13th overall.

Viewership and ratings per season of New Girl
| Season | Timeslot (ET) | Episodes | First aired | | Last aired | | TV season | Viewership rank | Avg. viewers (millions) | 18–49 rank | Avg. 18–49 rating |
| Season | Timeslot (ET) | Episodes | Date | Viewers (millions) | Date | Viewers (millions) | TV season | Viewership rank | Avg. viewers (millions) | 18–49 rank | Avg. 18–49 rating |
|---|---|---|---|---|---|---|---|---|---|---|---|
| 1 | Tuesday 9:00 p.m. | 24 | September 20, 2011 | 10.28 | May 8, 2012 | 5.61 | 2011–12 | 61 | 8.22 | TBD | 4.2/11 |
| 2 | Tuesday 8:00 p.m. (premiere); Tuesday 9:00 p.m. | 25 | September 25, 2012 | 5.35 | May 14, 2013 | 4.06 | 2012–13 | 77 | 5.85 | TBD | 3.2/9 |
| 3 | Tuesday 9:00 p.m. | 23 | September 17, 2013 | 5.53 | May 6, 2014 | 2.39 | 2013–14 | 103 | 4.61 | TBD | 3.2 |
| 4 | Tuesday 9:00 p.m. | 22 | September 16, 2014 | 3.04 | May 5, 2015 | 2.22 | 2014–15 | 138 | 3.42 | 79 | 1.8 |
| 5 | Tuesday 8:00 p.m. (1–15, 17, 19, 21); Tuesday 8:30 p.m. (16); Tuesday 9:00 p.m. (18, 20, 22) | 22 | January 5, 2016 | 3.33 | May 10, 2016 | 2.17 | 2015–16 | 125 | 3.69 | 59 | 1.8 |
| 6 | Tuesday 8:30 p.m. (1–10); Tuesday 8:00 p.m. (11–22) | 22 | September 20, 2016 | 2.31 | April 4, 2017 | 2.00 | 2016–17 | 133 | 2.93 | 70 | 1.5 |
| 7 | Tuesday 9:30 p.m. (1–4, 6, 8); Tuesday 9:00 p.m. (5, 7) | 8 | April 10, 2018 | 1.83 | May 15, 2018 | 1.46 | 2017–18 | 171 | 2.18 | 109 | 1.0 |

=== Critical response ===
On the review aggregator website Rotten Tomatoes, season one holds an approval rating of 84% based on 32 reviews, with an average rating of 6.83/10. Metacritic, which uses a weighted average, assigned the season a score of 66 out of 100 based on 25 critics, indicating "generally favorable reviews".

In June 2011, New Girl was one of eight honorees in the "most exciting new series" category at the 1st Critics' Choice Television Awards, voted by journalists who had seen the pilots. Robert Bianco of USA Today considered New Girl "fall's most promising new series" and praised how Deschanel and Meriwether "have shaped Jess into something we haven't quite seen before – a woman who is sweet yet crass, innocent yet sexy, beautiful yet clumsy, and brash yet irresistibly adorable." However, he noted how "Some people will be resistant to Deschanel's doe-eyed charm; others have a congenital need to insult anyone who most everyone else is praising, particularly if doing so gets them attention." The Hollywood Reporter's Tim Goodman saw the show as a "mostly romantic comedy", and although Jess' adorability "might seem like a thin premise, [...] Meriwether manages to make the situations funny and lets Deschanel channel her charm – a winning combination." David Wiegand of the San Francisco Chronicle would rather see the show tone down. He felt "the show's fundamental setup isn't all that inspired, but it could work with smarter writing and better direction, especially with regard to Deschanel", who, in his opinion, overplayed Jess' weird habits "to the point of overkill within the first 10 minutes of the show".

Alan Sepinwall of HitFix considered New Girl "the best new comedy of the fall season, and the only new show I genuinely enjoyed from start to finish" because it was so well developed from the start. He praised Deschanel's "wonderful comic performance" and said that while the supporting actors "all bounce nicely off of Deschanel", the scenes without Deschanel around them fell flat for him. Writing for the Daily News, David Hinckley lauded how none of the characters "settle in as the stereotypes they could easily become", and presumed that all of them would evolve and get smarter as the show progresses. Lori Rack of the Chicago Sun-Times praised the actors' comedic timing and playing off each other. Despite the guys sounding "like nightmares" on paper, "they have endearing, vulnerable cores that make them likable, and occasionally, lovable. [...] New Girl didn't give me as many laugh-out-loud moments as some comedies", but instead made her "feel warm and fuzzy". Rob Owen of the Pittsburgh Post-Gazette said the show's pilot was "more charming than hilarious" and "cuter than it is funny, but when it does conjure laughs, its style of humor is reminiscent of ABC's Happy Endings".

Many critics considered Max Greenfield the show's breakout star in season 1; The A.V. Club even named Greenfield's Schmidt "the year's breakout TV character" as a "douchebag with a heart of gold". Salon described Schmidt as "a sort of self-created alpha male and a collection of beta male qualities [... which] are performed with such conviction they congeal into a sort of deranged machismo, one slathered in sandalwood-scented lotion. As part of this transition, Schmidt has gone from being a douchebag in the classic model—a guy who, in the pilot, constantly wanted to show off his pecs and scam girls, and seemed capable of doing so—to a douche of a more unique variety." The Huffington Post's Maureen Ryan said how "Schmidt could have easily been 'the dumb guy', or the show could have exploited his status as an eminently mockable douche. But thanks to Max Greenfield's endearing depiction of the would-be lady-killer, there's a lot more the writers have been able to do with the character."

On Rotten Tomatoes, season two holds an approval rating of 88% based on 16 reviews, with an average rating of 6.56/10. After the teasing of the Nick–Jess relationship in the first season, critics named Jake Johnson the breakout star of season 2 as the characters' romance unfolded. Saying that "Not since Ross and Rachel's tango on Friends has watching a comedy romance been so satisfying", The Hollywood Reporter said the producers "did the impossible by engaging their leads in a love story, which only strengthened the artistry of the single-cam comedy". The New York Times said season 2 "erupted in fantastic and bizarre fits and starts" because of the characters' unmatched personalities, and lauded the writers for not playing up the will-they-or-won't-they dynamic. By emphasizing how the characters got together, the show "made for hilarious setups [that occasionally led] to high-level Abbott and Costello slapstick. The continued Nick–Jess relationship was criticized in season 3 for dropping the characters' personalities, lack of tension, and for neglecting the show's female friendship between Jess and Cece.

On Rotten Tomatoes, season three holds an approval rating of 88% based on 14 reviews, with an average rating of 6.46/10. Season four holds an approval rating of 100% based on 10 reviews, with an average rating of 6.67/10. The series' seventh and final season has an approval rating of 100% based on 10 reviews, with an average rating of 6.78, and a critical consensus of, "After seven years of friendship, New Girl signs off with a thoughtful, funny final season that bids a proper adieu to its colorful cast of characters."

=== Awards and nominations ===
The show has been nominated for several awards, including five Golden Globe Awards and five Primetime Emmy Awards.
