= What They Play =

Video game website

- Website type: Gaming, Parenting
- Owner: News Corporation
- Creators: John Davison, Ira Becker
- Website: www.whattheyplay.com
- Commercial: Yes
- Registration: Optional (required for contributing reviews)
- Launched: November 12, 2007

What They Play was a video game-centric website, aimed at helping parents learn about content in video games, and also to help them decide what games their children should play. It was the first of several websites to launch under "What They Like, Inc.", other sites featuring books, movies and music followed.

== History ==
The site was launched in 2007 by two former Ziff Davis members, Ira Becker, executive vice-president of the Game Group, and ex-1UP.com writer and Senior vice-president of the Game Group John Davison. Davison announced his departure from Ziff in August 2007, with Becker's announcement soon following. The two raised over $3 million to fund the creation and launch of the site. The site was launched in beta in on November 12, 2007.

== Acquisition ==
On September 24, 2009, the site was acquired by News Corporation. As of September 2011, the site no longer appears operational, and all links redirect to IGN.com or its affiliates. The site's Twitter account has been inactive since February 2011, though no official word of closure exists; it is unclear when and why the website shut down.

== Format ==
The site contained a database of over 16,000 games divided by console, genre and ESRB rating. The site employed a small editorial staff of seven to play and review games based on their content, but also allowed parents to leave comments and reviews under each game describing their thoughts on the game's content and/or their child's reaction to the game. Parents could also submit an age-appropriateness rating, assigned on a scale from 1-17.
