= Pilot (New Girl) =

- New Girl episode
- Schmidt gives dating advice to Jess
- Episode no.: Season 1 Episode 1
- Directed by: Jake Kasdan
- Written by: Elizabeth Meriwether
- Original air date: September 20, 2011

Guest appearances
- Mary Elizabeth Ellis as Caroline; Gillian Vigman as Kim

Episode chronology
← Previous —	Next → "Kryptonite"
- New Girl season 1

"Pilot" is the pilot episode of the American television sitcom New Girl. The episode was written by series creator Elizabeth Meriwether and directed by Jake Kasdan. First premiering on Fox in the United States on September 20, 2011, it was met with positive critical reception.

== Plot ==
The show begins with Jessica "Jess" Day talking to her her potential new roommates from a craigslist ad about seducing her boyfriend by coming home early and stripping down for him. While talking to her friend Cece, a model, on the phone, we hear that she is naked in the back of the cab wearing a big trench coat. When asked what her stripper name will be, she replies 'Rebecca Johnson', then 'Two Boobs Johnson', and later 'Tiger Boobs'. Jess comes home and her boyfriend Spencer is shocked to see her there, but he is cheating on her with another woman who comes out of the bedroom while Jess is attempting a striptease with pillows and bows. While doing a mediocre job on seducing him (taking off the trench coat and doing "sexy stuff' to various objects), the girl comes out and Jess is shocked. Now she lives with three single men (whom she found on Craigslist and thought they were women) called Nick, Schmidt and Coach in an apartment. During most of the week she lives there, she begins to have mood swings about her break up such as watching Dirty Dancing. Her roommates are sick of it and invite her to a bar to find a man on the rebound. She ends up on a date but her date bails on her and he goes to the same party as her roommates are at. They all go to the restaurant and cheer Jess up by singing "(I've Had) The Time of My Life" proving that they do care about her as a friend.

== Production ==
The episode was written by Elizabeth Meriwether, and directed by Jake Kasdan. The episode first aired on Fox in the United States on September 20, 2011. Speaking of the show Zooey Deschanel claimed that her character in New Girl resembles a younger version of herself. She said "I think Jess as a person, and the way that her personality is, has some of myself and especially some of my younger self," she suggested. "[She resembles] my 13-year-old self." Deschanel added that Jess will explore her lost youth after she is dumped by her long-term boyfriend. "I have to find a new support system, so I'm basically living my 20s as I approach my 30s," she explained.

== Reception ==
=== Ratings ===
When the episode was first broadcast, it pulled in more viewers than its lead-in, Glee for the episode "The Purple Piano Project", which brought in 8.9m (5.4) in the 8:00 p.m. hour, after which New Girl launched with 10.1m (4.7).

=== Accolades ===
Jake Kasdan was nominated for the Primetime Emmy Award for Outstanding Directing for a Comedy Series for this episode.
