= Normal (New Girl) =

- New Girl episode
- Episode no.: Season 1 Episode 20
- Directed by: Jesse Peretz
- Written by: Luvh Rakhe
- Production code: 1ATM19
- Original air date: April 10, 2012

Guest appearances
- Kareem Abdul-Jabbar as Himself; Michaela Watkins as Gina; Phil Hendrie as Joe Napoli; Rizwan Manji as Interviewer; Dermot Mulroney as Russell

Episode chronology
← Previous "Secrets"	Next → "Kids"
- New Girl (season 1)

"Normal" is the twentieth episode of the first season of the American sitcom television series New Girl. It was written by Luvh Rakhe and directed by Jesse Peretz. The episode aired on April 10, 2012, on Fox.

== Plot ==
Jess (Zooey Deschanel) brings her new boyfriend Russell (Dermot Mulroney) home to the loft to meet her roommates. After some reluctance, the men bond when the group plays True American, an active drinking game. The game ends when Cece (Hannah Simone) retreats to Schmidt's bed, prompting Schmidt (Max Greenfield) to join her. Nick (Jake Johnson) then shares his idea for "real apps," a suite of physical "apps" for smartphones with functionality similar to a Swiss Army knife. He accidentally wounds Russell with the prototype, prompting Russell to leave, to Jess's disappointment.

Winston (Lamorne Morris) begins a new job in "Normal" as an assistant to sports talk show host Joe Napoli (Phil Hendrie). Winston's initial enthusiasm for the job fades when he realizes Napoli is an abrasive and disrespectful boss. Kareem Abdul-Jabbar has a cameo appearance as a guest on Napoli's show.

== True American ==
After "Normal" aired, internet sources began to summarize the rules for True American, which the characters described as a mix of a drinking game and Candy Land where the floor is lava; it also involves shouting the names of American presidents. The idea of True American came from a New Girl writer who played a similar game in college. As she could not remember the game's exact rules, the writers focused on making the game as funny on the page as possible, but only established chanting "JFK! FDR!" and walking on chairs. As the cast did not understand the game during shooting, the writers created more rules on the spot, advised the actors to "have fun, dig in, jump in" and play it as if "they'd been playing this thing for years and years and years." The high-energy feel of the game and the amounts of coverage made filming True American more challenging for the actors than normal episodes. Producers Dave Finkel, Brett Baer, and writer Luvh Rakhe, came up with most of the obscure American history facts, but much was cut from the finished episode. Fox subsequently released a set of official rules for the game, which can be summarized "There are no real rules". The characters also played True American in "Cooler", the 15th episode of the second season, in "Mars Landing", the 20th episode of the third season and in "Wedding Eve" the 21st episode of the fifth season.

== Reception ==
In its original American broadcast, Normal" was watched by 5.23 million viewers, according to Nielsen Media Research. It garnered a 2.8 rating/7% share in the 18-49 demographic, making it the second highest-rated program in its timeslot, behind The Voice on NBC.

The A.V. Club called the episode "the young series at its best," rating it an A− overall. The staff of The Atlantic included it in their list of the best TV episodes of 2012, comparing the actors' performances to "the best sitcom ensembles" of Seinfeld, Will & Grace, and Friends. Alan Sepinwall said the episode "didn't seem quite as effortlessly hilarious as several recent episodes" but was still enjoyable.
