= Brett Baer =

American television producer and screenwriter

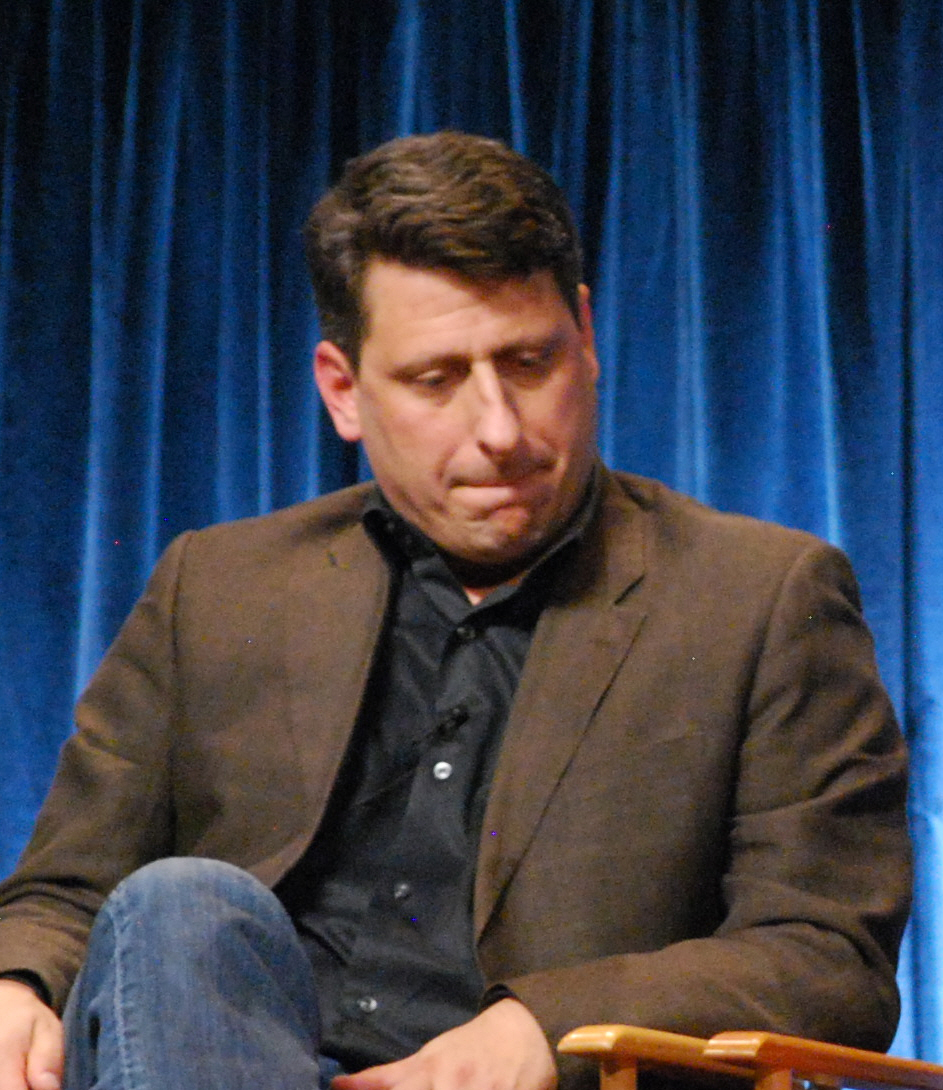
Brett Baer at Paleyfest 2012, in March 2012

Brett Baer is an American television producer and screenwriter who has worked on many successful television shows. Baer often works with his screenwriting partner Dave Finkel. Brett grew up in Deerfield, Illinois, and attended the USC School of Cinematic Arts.

== Writing work ==
- New Girl (2011–2018)
- 30 Rock (2006)
- Joey (2005)
- The Norm Show
- Duckman
- Argo and York (Pilot)
- Bad Sisters for which he was nominated for a 2023 Emmy Award.
