= Dave Finkel =

American television producer and screenwriter

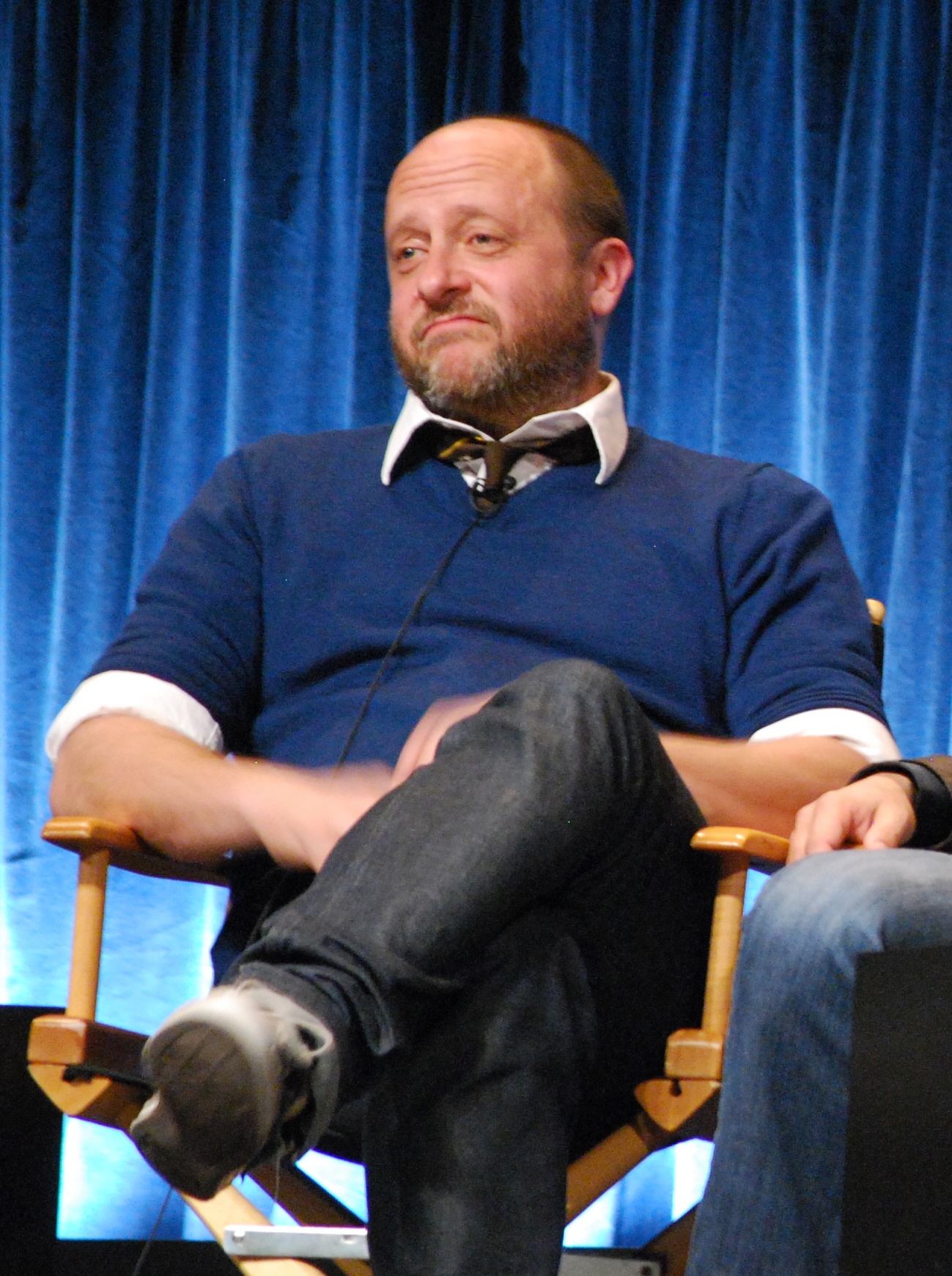
- Finkel at the 2012 Paleyfest
- Born: May 15, 1970 (age 56); Los Angeles, California, U.S.
- Occupations: Television producer, screenwriter

Dave Finkel (born May 15, 1970) is an American television producer and screenwriter who has worked on many successful television shows. He often works with his screenwriting partner Brett Baer.

== Writing work ==
- New Girl (2011–2018)
- United States of Tara (2008–2011)
- 30 Rock (2006)
- Joey (2005)
- The Norm Show
- Pinky and the Brain
- Duckman
- Animaniacs
- Ageo and York (Pilot)
- What They Play
