= Elizabeth Meriwether =

American writer and producer

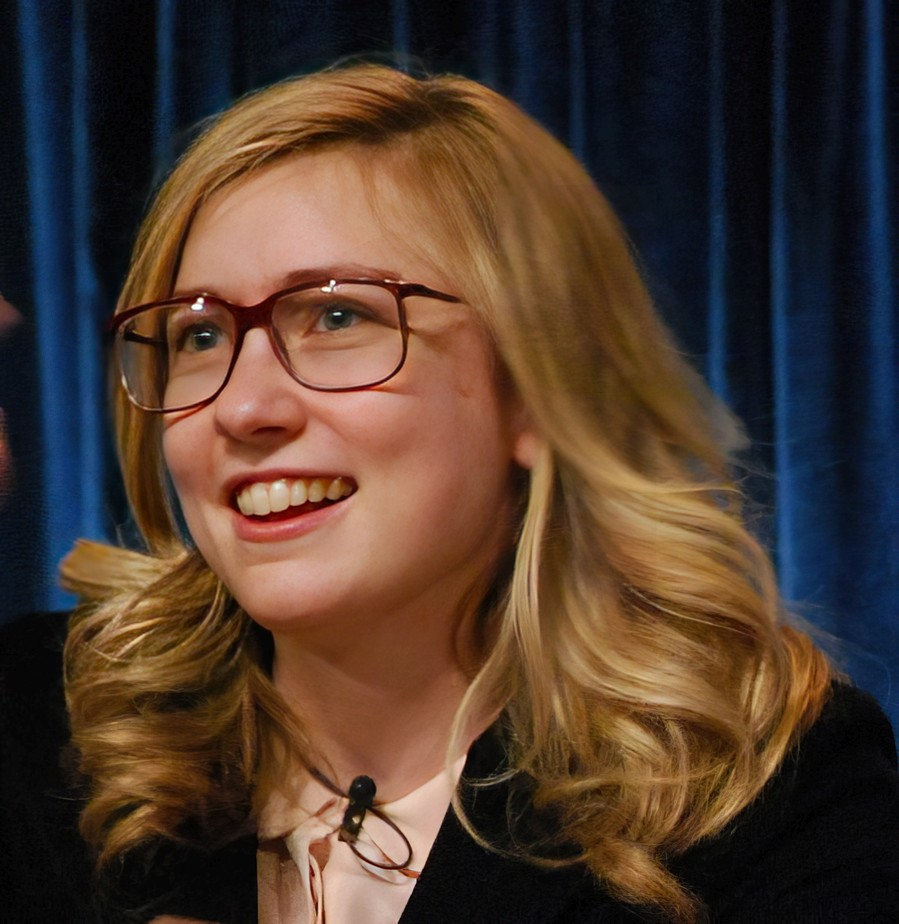
- Born: Elizabeth Hughes Meriwether; October 11, 1981 (age 45); Miami, Florida, U.S.
- Education: Yale University (BA); Juilliard School (GrDip)
- Occupations: Playwright, screenwriter, television producer, showrunner
- Years active: 2000–present
- Notable work: New Girl; No Strings Attached
- Children: 3

Elizabeth Hughes Meriwether (born October 11, 1981) is an American writer, producer and television showrunner. She is known for creating the Fox sitcom New Girl, and for writing the play Oliver Parker! (2010) and the romantic comedy film No Strings Attached (2011). She also created the ABC sitcoms Single Parents, Bless This Mess, as well as the Hulu dramas The Dropout and Dying for Sex.

== Early life and education ==
Meriwether was born on October 11, 1981, in Miami, Florida. Her family moved from Miami to Detroit, Michigan, when she was five years old, and then to Ann Arbor, Michigan, when she was 10. Her father, Heath J. Meriwether, was the publisher of the newspaper Detroit Free Press, and her mother, Patricia Hughes Meriweather, was a painter. Meriwether grew up aspiring to be an actress, but when she wrote her first play, she realized she wanted to be a playwright instead. Meriwether graduated from Greenhills High School in Ann Arbor. in 2000.

Meriwether graduated from Yale University in 2005. She double-majored in English and theater studies.

== Career ==
=== 2006–2010: Early work ===
Meriwether wrote the plays Heddatron (2006), The Mistakes Madeline Made (2006) and Oliver Parker! (2010). She held a showcase of her plays in Los Angeles, in which a young Emma Stone was cast. Meriwether has credited the showcase and Stone's participation as an important point in her career trajectory. Upon moving to Los Angeles, Meriwether developed a play called Sluts. As part of a program to help aspiring playwrights adapt their scripts for television, she turned the idea into a television pilot. The pilot, described as "a raunchy, honest look at the messy dating lives of twentysomething women" was filmed for 20th Century Fox Television, but ultimately not picked up. However, it succeeded in establishing Meriwether as a distinctive comedic voice. In 2010, she wrote an episode of Adult Swim's Childrens Hospital.

=== 2010–2019: Film debut and New Girl ===
Meriwether wrote the 2011 romantic comedy film No Strings Attached, directed by Ivan Reitman and starring Natalie Portman and Ashton Kutcher. The film's working title was Fuckbuddies.

After her success with No Strings Attached, 20th Century Fox Television approached Meriwether about developing another television series. Meriwether pitched an idea about an "offbeat girl moving in with three single guys", inspired by her experience of "bouncing from Craigslist sublet to Craigslist sublet, for four years in L.A." when she was in her twenties.

The show, New Girl, was greenlit in 2011 with an initial order of 13 episodes and Zooey Deschanel in the title role. It aired 146 episodes over seven seasons. It was well received by critics and nominated for a number of awards, including five Golden Globe Awards and five Primetime Emmy Awards.

In 2013, she signed a multi-year overall deal with 20th Century Fox Television, to develop additional projects for the studio. Her deal was renewed in 2019.

=== 2020–present: Career expansion ===
Meriwether received put pilot commitment from ABC for the show Woman Up. She worked on the project with Zoe Lister-Jones, and Jason Winer.

In 2025, Meriwether's show Dying for Sex was nominated for nine Primetime Emmy Awards. She was personally nominated for Outstanding Writing for a Limited or Anthology Series or Movie. In March 2026, her deal with 20th Television was renewed again.

In 2026, it was announced Meriwether will pen the screenplay for Universal's upcoming Britney Spears biopic from director Jon M. Chu. The movie will be based on Spears' memoir "The Woman in Me."

== The Fempire ==
Meriwether is part of "The Fempire", a group of female screenwriters that includes Dana Fox, Diablo Cody and Lorene Scafaria. In 2012, the Fempire received the Athena Film Festival Award for Creativity and Sisterhood at Barnard College in New York City.

Meriwether is also a well-known feminist, who has done stand-up comedy, and performed for The Vagina Monologues in Las Vegas.

== Filmography ==
=== Film ===
Year	Title	Writer	Co-producer
2011	No Strings Attached	Yes	Yes

=== Television ===
Year	Title	Credited as				Network
Year	Title	Creator	Writer	Executive Producer	Director	Network
2011–2018	New Girl	Yes	Yes	Yes	Yes	Fox
2018–2020	Single Parents	Yes	Yes	Yes	No	ABC
2019–2020	Bless This Mess	Yes	Yes	Yes	No	ABC
2022	The Dropout	Yes	Yes	Yes	No	Hulu
2025	Dying for Sex	Yes	Yes	Yes	No	FX on Hulu
2026	Furious	Yes	Yes	Yes	No	Hulu

== Awards and nominations ==
Organizations	Year	Category	Work	Result	Ref.
Primetime Emmy Awards	2022	Outstanding Limited or Anthology Series	The Dropout	Nominated	
Primetime Emmy Awards	2022	Outstanding Writing for a Limited or Anthology Series	The Dropout	Nominated	
Primetime Emmy Awards	2025	Outstanding Limited or Anthology Series	Dying for Sex	Nominated	
Primetime Emmy Awards	2025	Outstanding Writing for a Limited or Anthology Series	Dying for Sex	Nominated	
Producers Guild of America	2023	Outstanding Producer of Limited or Anthology Series Television	The Dropout	Won	
Producers Guild of America	2026	Outstanding Producer of Limited or Anthology Series Television	Dying for Sex	Nominated	
Writers Guild of America	2012	New Series	New Girl	Nominated	
Writers Guild of America	2023	Limited Series	The Dropout	Nominated	
Writers Guild of America	2026	Limited Series	Dying for Sex	Won	
