= Prince (New Girl) =

- New Girl episode
- Prince introduces himself to Jess and Nick
- Episode no.: Season 3 Episode 14
- Directed by: Fred Goss
- Written by: David Feeney; Rob Rosell
- Production code: 3ATM15
- Original air date: February 2, 2014

Guest appearances
- Damon Wayans, Jr. as Coach; Prince as Himself; Clayton Kershaw as Himself; Alessandra Ambrosio as Herself; Ana Beatriz Barros as Herself; Lais Ribeiro as Herself; Michael Zane as Bouncer; Chante Carmel as Attractive Woman; Joshua Welton as Bouncer #2; Hannah Welton as Band Member #1; Ida Nielsen as Band Member #2; Donna Grantis as Band Member #3; Damaris Lewis as Dancer

Episode chronology
← Previous "Birthday"	Next → "Exes"
- New Girl (season 3)

"Prince" is the fourteenth episode of the third season of the American sitcom New Girl, and the sixty-third overall. It was written by David Feeney and Rob Rosell, and directed by Fred Goss. It was broadcast on February 2, 2014, on Fox in the United States. In the episode, best friends Jess Day (Zooey Deschanel) and Cece Parikh (Hannah Simone) are invited to a party held at Prince's house. When Jess's boyfriend Nick Miller (Jake Johnson) tells her he loves her, she gives him an unexpected response, which results in Nick and his roommates crashing Prince's party, so Nick can talk to Jess. At the party, Prince gives Jess advice that helps her tell Nick she loves him too.

After learning that New Girl had secured the post-Super Bowl XLVIII timeslot, writers and producers began preparing an episode that would attract newcomers to the show, as well as creating something special for regular viewers. Around the time of the announcement, Prince enquired about making a guest appearance on the show and it was decided that the episode would be written around him. During production, Prince made contributions to the script and debuted a new song, featuring vocals from Deschanel. "Prince" was filmed in December 2013 and became one of the most expensive episodes of New Girl to be shot. It also features guest appearances from baseball player Clayton Kershaw and models Alessandra Ambrosio, Ana Beatriz Barros and Lais Ribeiro.

"Prince" was seen by 26.30 million viewers, according to Nielsen Media Research, making it by far the most watched episode of New Girl. It became the highest rated scripted entertainment telecast on television in three years, since the post-Super Bowl episode of Glee. "Prince" received a mixed response from critics, many of whom enjoyed Prince's performance, but most thought the plot was not as strong as previous episodes, with one calling it "a little tedious". Following Prince's death on April 21, 2016, Fox reran the episode on April 26 in tribute.

== Plot ==
Jess Day (Zooey Deschanel) and her best friend Cece (Hannah Simone) are invited to a party held at Prince's house. Just as they are leaving, Jess's boyfriend Nick Miller (Jake Johnson) spontaneously tells Jess he loves her for the first time. Surprised, Jess replies with a finger gun hand gesture. At a bar, Nick admits that he meant what he said, but wanted to tell Jess in a more romantic setting. His roommate Schmidt (Max Greenfield) suggests he crashes Prince's party and takes his "I love you" back. Outside the house, Nick and Schmidt watch on as their roommates Winston Bishop (Lamorne Morris) and Coach (Damon Wayans, Jr.) use an improv story to gain entry to the party. After their effort fails, Nick gets in by hiding behind a group of models, while Schmidt is forced to climb through a hedge. As Nick and Jess catch up to each other, Jess tries to tell Nick that she loves him, but suffers a panic attack and faints. In the garden, Nick tries to take back his declaration of love.

As their friends give them a moment alone, Prince appears and asks what the problem is. Nick and Jess explain their situation and Prince asks to spend some time alone with Jess. Nick gets drunk and interrupts Winston and Coach's conversation with two supermodels. Over pancakes, Jess tells Prince that she is scared to admit her feelings and is worried that if something goes wrong, it will be too painful. Prince gives Jess a makeover and advises her to tell Nick she loves him back. He also tells her to stop being afraid. Jess returns to the party, where she tells Nick she loves him and he reciprocates. Prince takes to the stage to perform "Fallinlove2nite" and invites Jess to sing with him. The others join them on stage. Back at the apartment, everyone is reminiscing about dancing with Prince, when Jess realises Cece is missing. The scene cuts to Cece, who is still at the house, playing table tennis with Prince.

== Production ==
=== Conception and writing ===
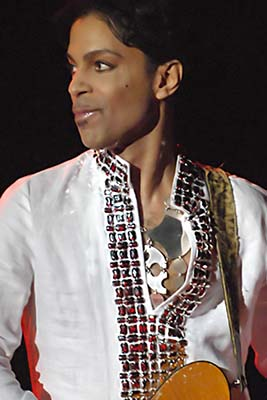
"Prince" marked the only time the musician appeared in a television series.

On May 13, 2013, Fox announced that an episode of New Girl would be the lead-out program following Super Bowl XLVIII on February 2, 2014. The production team began preparing for the episode the moment they found out the news. The show's creator Elizabeth Meriwether told Michael O'Connell of The Hollywood Reporter that they had an opportunity to introduce the show to a new audience, as well as creating a special episode for regular viewers. The team's main aim was to make it funny and romantic. The last sitcom to follow the Super Bowl was The Office in 2009, while the Friends episode "The One After the Superbowl" is the highest-rated Super Bowl lead-out program ever.

On December 12, 2013, it was announced that Prince would be guest starring in the episode as himself, the only time he appeared in a television series. Meriwether told O'Connell that near to the time Fox gave New Girl the post-Super Bowl spot, Prince's team also enquired about him making a guest appearance during the third season, and they decided to write the episode around him. Meriwether had heard that Prince was a fan of New Girl and that it was one of the few shows he watched. She also revealed that Prince had previously been offered a guest appearance in the season two episode "Virgins". However, he could not accept at the time, but still wanted to appear in the show.

At least two scripts were rejected, as they were not in keeping with the show. One storyline had Prince playing the lead singer of a Prince cover band. Meriwether said that Prince's appearance with the main characters also needed to be believable. Eventually the writers, Rob Rosell and Dave Feeney, scripted an episode that would see the characters attending a party at Prince's house, where he would help Jess and Nick say "I love you" for the first time. In a piece for Vulture, Meriwether recalled that Prince was pleased that he would be the person who helps get Jess and Nick to admit how they truly felt about each other.

Prince came up with the idea of helping Jess by giving her a makeover, and asked that the house party on the show was as close as possible to his real house parties. Four days before filming was due to start, Prince pulled out as he was unhappy with changes to the script. Meriwether explained that Fox had asked that the episode ended with a scene at the apartment, so she had Nick and Jess declare their love for one another in the bathroom. After speaking with Prince, Meriwether realised that he needed to be the one to get through to Jess, and promised to revise the script immediately. Prince agreed again to be part of the episode that same day. Meriwether said the episode was "a big milestone" for Nick and Jess romantically, and that the storyline would continue to play out during the rest of the season.

=== Filming and music ===
The episode was directed by Fred Goss. Filming took place in December 2013, and "Prince" became one of the most expensive episodes of New Girl to be shot, as a house needed to be rented out and new sets built. Prince was on set for three days. Meriwether recalled that he was "fantastic at ping-pong" and told Simone to practice before their scene together. The musician was surprised when she scored a point off him during the first take. Prince also changed a scripted moment in which he shines a flashlight under his chin to a lighter, as he believed it was funnier. The episode featured cameo appearances from baseball player Clayton Kershaw, and models Alessandra Ambrosio, Ana Beatriz Barros and Lais Ribeiro. In May 2016, Deschanel told Conan O'Brien that Khloé Kardashian and Kris Jenner had also filmed cameos. However, their scenes were cut after a member of Prince's team asked about the celebrity appearances and commented "I hope it's not the Kardashians". Prince felt that they would never be at one of his parties.

Prince used his appearance in the episode to premiere his new song "Fallinlove2nite", which features vocals from Deschanel. The actress told Sandy Coen of the Associated Press that the producers wanted her character to go up on stage and sing with Prince, so they asked her to lay down a vocal for the sound department, who sent it to Prince. The following day, her vocal was mixed into the song. Shortly before the scene was filmed, Prince asked producer Erin O'Malley for a megaphone. As the song began to play, Prince used the megaphone to call out "Does anyone want to fall in love tonight?". The crowd of actors and extras gave an unscripted cheer. Meriwether admitted that she teared up following the take. The episode also featured Prince's "When You Were Mine" from Prince's 1980 album Dirty Mind, during the scenes where Prince gives Jess a makeover.

== Reception ==
=== Ratings ===
In its original American broadcast on February 2, 2014, "Prince" was viewed by 26.3 million viewers, according to Nielsen Media Research, making it the most watched-episode of New Girl. The episode drew an 11.4 rating in adults between the ages of 18 and 49. In contrast, the average viewership of an episode in the third season of New Girl, excluding "Prince", was 3.30 million. "Prince" posted a 42 percent increase in adults 18–49, and a 23 percent increase in viewers over the previous year's post-Super Bowl episode of Elementary. New Girl became the highest rated scripted entertainment telecast on television in three years, since Fox's post-Super Bowl episode of Glee, "The Sue Sylvester Shuffle". As expected, New Girl benefited from following the broadcast of Super Bowl XLVIII, which was seen by 112.19 million average viewers, making it the most watched Super Bowl in history at the time.

Following Prince's death on April 21, 2016, Fox decided to replay the episode on April 26 as a tribute to him. The re-broadcast earned 1.78 million viewers, according to Nielsen Media Research. It drew a 0.7/2 rating/share in adults between the ages of 18 and 49.

=== Critical response ===
The episode's plot received mixed reviews from television critics, but Prince's guest appearance was well received. Marc Hogan of Spin found the humour around "characters inexplicably fainting" to be "a bit too FOX sitcom-y", but he called Prince's appearance "pure gold". Lanford Beard from Entertainment Weekly also praised Prince's appearance, in particular describing the makeover scenes "deliciously understated" and "a nice counterpart to New Girl's frequently over-the-top comedy". Chris Morgan of Paste felt that while the episode "certainly wasn't the greatest", it was "a strange, fabulous moment in the history of the series, and also a testament to the kind of life Prince chose to live."

TVLine's Kimberly Roots admitted that she did not laugh once during the episode, which she said was "not New Girl's sharpest". Similarly, IGN UK's Max Nicholson thought some elements of the episode were "a stretch" and found the plot to be "a little tedious". But he added that Nick and Jess's storyline was "made much more enjoyable" with the addition of Prince and "a few asides" from the other lead characters. Vulture's Josh Gondelman awarded "Prince" three out of five stars. He did not think the conflict between Nick and Jess was believable enough, saying "I was just frustrated because the stakes in this episode were staggeringly low. Nothing seemed to really matter to anyone."

Alan Sepinwall from HitFix found the episode to be "funny and joyful [...] and strange and poignant, all in perfect proportion." Likewise, Erik Adams of The A.V. Club, who gave the episode a B+ score called it "very, very funny". He felt Prince improved the plot and added that his involvement in Nick and Jess's romance was "a new spin on a storyline that countless other TV shows and movies have tried out." Adams also praised the show's editorial team for the montage.
