= Hit and Run Tour (2014) =

2014–15 concert tour by Prince and 3rdeyegirl

- Tour by Prince and 3rdeyegirl
- Poster to the May 2014 concerts (UK & Benelux)
- Location: Europe; North America
- Associated album: Plectrumelectrum; Art Official Age
- Start date: February 5, 2014
- End date: June 14, 2015
- Legs: 3
- No. of shows: 27 (28 scheduled)

Prince and 3rdeyegirl concert chronology
- Live Out Loud Tour (2013); Hit and Run Tour (2014–15); Piano & a Microphone Tour (2016)

The Hit and Run Tour was the penultimate concert tour by American recording artist Prince and 3rdeyegirl. The tour consisted of three legs. The first was in the United Kingdom, the second in Europe, and the third in North America.

== Personnel ==
- Prince – lead vocals and guitar
- Hannah Welton – drums
- Donna Grantis – rhythm guitar
- Ida Kristine Nielsen – bass
- Joshua Welton – percussion

== Tour dates ==
List of 2014 concerts
Date	City	Country	Venue
February 5, 2014	London	England	Electric Ballroom
February 9, 2014	London	England	O2 Shepherd's Bush Empire
February 14, 2014	London	England	Kings Place
February 16, 2014	London	England	KOKO
February 18, 2014	London	England	Ronnie Scott's Jazz Club
February 21, 2014	Manchester	England	Manchester Academy
February 22, 2014	Manchester	England	Manchester Academy
March 15, 2014	Oakland	United States	Fox Oakland Theatre
May 15, 2014	Birmingham	England	LG Arena
May 16, 2014	Manchester	England	Phones 4u Arena
May 17, 2014	Manchester	England	Phones 4u Arena
May 19, 2014	Birmingham	England	LG Arena
May 20, 2014	London	England	Café de Paris
May 22, 2014	Glasgow	Scotland	SSE Hydro
May 23, 2014	Leeds	England	First Direct Arena
May 25, 2014	Amsterdam	Netherlands	Ziggo Dome
May 27, 2014	Antwerp	Belgium	Sportpaleis
May 30, 2014	Brussels	Belgium	Botanique
June 1, 2014	Paris	France	Zénith Paris
June 4, 2014	London	England	Roundhouse
June 7, 2014	Vienna	Austria	Wiener Stadthalle

List of 2015 concerts
Date	City	Country	Venue
March 14, 2015	Louisville	United States	The Louisville Palace
March 15, 2015	Louisville	United States	The Louisville Palace
April 9, 2015	Detroit	United States	Fox Theatre
May 19, 2015	Toronto	Canada	Sony Centre for the Performing Arts
May 21, 2015	Montreal	Canada	Bell Centre
June 14, 2015	Washington, D.C.	United States	Warner Theatre

=== Box office score data ===
Venue	City	Tickets Sold / Available	Gross Revenue
Fox theatre	Oakland	2,800 / 2,800 (100%)	$303,800
Sportpaleis	Antwerp	19,639 / 20,454 (96%)	$2,259,800

=== Cancelled dates ===
List of cancelled concerts, showing date, city, country, venue, and reason for cancellation
Date	City	Country	Venue	Reason
June 3, 2014	Berlin	Germany	Tempodrom	Unknown, possible illness
