= Hit n Run Tour =

Hit n Run Tour may refer to:

- Hit 'n Run Tour (2007), by Kiss
- Hit n Run Tour (2000), solo tour by Prince
- Hit and Run Tour (2014), tour by Prince and 3rdeyegirl

== See also ==
- Hit and run (disambiguation)
