= Hannah Welton =

American drummer

- Born: Hannah Ford; June 29, 1990 (age 36); Louisville, Kentucky, United States
- Genres: Funk; gospel; jazz fusion; hard rock
- Occupations: Musician, drummer
- Instruments: Drums, vocals
- Formerly of: The Hannah Ford Band, PANDORUM, Bellevue Suite, 3rdeyegirl, Prince, Donna Grantis, Ida Nielsen

Hannah Welton (born June 29, 1990) is an American drummer from Louisville, Kentucky. She is perhaps known best for her work playing drums for Prince.

== Biography ==
In 1990, Welton was born as Hannah Ford in Louisville, Kentucky.

=== Musical education ===
Welton's first practical experience as a drummer was in her primary school ensemble, Louisville Leopard Percussionists.

In 2002, at the age of 12, Welton began playing professionally in her father's blues band in Chicago.

Welton continued her musical education with a scholarship at the Chicago College of Performing Arts, studying in the Vocal Jazz Department as well as playing in the school's Latin Ensemble and Big Band Orchestra.

Welton previously played jazz fusion in her own band as well as with the trio Pandorum. In 2010, she joined the Milwaukee-based rock band Bellevue Suite.

The former Hannah Ford married Joshua Welton, who co-produced three Prince albums and guested with 3rdeyegirl performances on keyboard and cowbell.

=== With Prince and 3rdeyegirl ===
In September 2012, Welton was recruited by Prince as a guest drummer for the Welcome 2 Chicago three-show residency after seeing videos of her performing online. Soon after, she appeared as lead drummer of the New Power Generation for Prince's performance of his song, Rock And Roll Love Affair on Jimmy Kimmel Live!'s show on 23 October 2012, as well as in the official music video.

Asked by Prince to look for a female guitarist, Hannah, together with her husband Joshua, scouted online and found Donna Grantis via her videos on YouTube in late November. She auditioned one week later at Paisley Park Studios and was subsequently recruited in December 2012. Bassist Ida Kristine Nielsen had been performing with The NPG since October 2010, and the only member of the trio to have previous experience playing for Prince.

In December 2012, 3rdeyegirl were formed and went on to tour with Prince on his Live Out Loud Tour in 2013, and his Hit and Run Tour from 2014 to 2015.

In 2013, Welton was offered a spot in Prince's backing band 3rdeyegirl with guitarist Donna Grantis and bassist Ida Kristine Nielsen.

Joshua Welton would also join the tours on percussion. He co-produced Prince's next two albums, Art Official Age and Hit n Run Phase One, and co-wrote most tracks on the latter.

In 2013, along with Bellevue Suite, Welton released the album This Far From Sanity (2013).

In 2014, 3rdeyegirl released their first and only album, Plectrumelectrum.

=== Other works ===
In 2016, Prince died.

In 2018, in the wake of Prince's death, Hannah and Joshua were inspired to start their own Christian ministry, called "Your Will Be Done Ministries", a "virtual church".

== Discography ==
With Bellevue Suite

- This Far from Sanity (2013)

With Prince and 3rdeyegirl

- Plectrumelectrum (2014)
