= Fallinlove2nite =

Single by Prince

from the album Hit n Run Phase One
- Released: March 17, 2014
- Recorded: 2013
- Genre: EDM; europop
- Length: 3:18
- Label: NPG; Epic
- Songwriters: Prince; Joshua Welton
- Producers: Prince; Joshua Welton

Prince singles chronology
"Pretzelbodylogic" (2014)	"Fallinlove2nite" (2014)	"Breakdown" (2014)

"Fallinlove2nite" is a song by American musician Prince, released as a digital single on March 17, 2014, and promoted as being a stand-alone single. It was made available on iTunes and Amazon. The song peaked at No. 40 in Belgium on April 5, 2014. On April 26, it peaked in the US on the Billboard Adult R&B Airplay chart at No. 29.

The single is credited to "Prince feat. Zooey Deschanel"; it is only the second commercially available single by Prince to contain a co-credit other than Prince's own band (following "U Make My Sun Shine" featuring Angie Stone; singles featuring Sheena Easton were credited only to Prince). The song had been broadcast (as an edited studio recording) during Prince's appearance on the TV series New Girl on February 2, 2014. It was premiered on radio station 102.3 KJLH, based in Los Angeles, California, before being available to stream in full the following week on iHeart Radio's website and on 3rdEyeGirl YouTube account.

"Fallinlove2nite" (without Deschanel's vocals) was included on Prince's 38th studio album Hit n Run Phase One when it was released in September 2015, but this project is believed to have come later. In retrospect, however, "Fallinlove2nite" can be considered the album's first single.

== Background ==
"Fallinlove2nite" is the sixth track on Prince's 38th album Hitnrun Phase One. 18 months earlier, however, a slightly different version was released on the stand-alone digital single Fallinlove2nite (Prince's first on Epic Records) in March 2014. The song was first broadcast (as an edited studio recording) on February 2, 2014, during Prince's appearance on the TV series New Girl. The full studio version was premiered (along with Funknroll) in March 2014, on radio station 102.3 KJLH, based in Los Angeles, California, before being available to stream in full the following week on iHeart Radio's website.

The song was recorded specifically for the New Girl appearance, as vocals are shared between Prince and the show's lead actress Zooey Deschanel (who is also a professional singer, as one half of She & Him). Although the New Girl performance was intended to appear as though the track was being performed live, it was lip-synched over the studio recording. The song made a lengthier appearance when Prince spent a whole hour on the Arsenio Hall Show where he also performed "FunkNRoll" from his album Art Official Age, the Family's "Mutiny" and his B-side "She's Always in My Hair".

The version included on Hitnrun Phase One does not contain Deschanel's vocals, and it is likely that it is the full studio version prior to her vocal overdubs, rather than her vocals being removed. While specific recording dates are not known, it is assumed to have been recorded in late 2013 at Paisley Park Studios in Chanhassen, Minnesota (Prince's performance on the show was filmed on two days beginning 12 December 2013). The music was created by Joshua Welton around the vocal stems submitted by Prince. It is therefore safe to assume that an earlier recording of the song with different music by Prince also exists. The vocal stems also contained a third verse that were not kept for the final version.

== Critical reception ==
Spencer Kornhaber from The Atlantic writes "perhaps the least Prince-like but most straightforwardly fun thing here is Fallinlove2nite, an electronic-dance whirlwind that he originally recorded with Zooey Deschanel in connection with a New Girl cameo. Zooey's gone and Prince's voice sounds pitch-shifted up; the lyrics about dance-floor abandon are generic enough to have been given to any pop star in the past 10 years. But there's a sense of increasing acceleration, of giddiness, as woodwinds and synth melodies enter the mix and Prince asks, over and over, if you want to fall in love tonight."
