= Free Urself =

Single by Prince
- Released: September 30, 2015
- Recorded: 2015
- Studio: Paisley Park
- Length: 3:39
- Label: NPG

Prince singles chronology
"This Could B Us" (2015)	"Free Urself" (2015)	"Nothing Compares 2 U (original studio version)" (2018)

"Free Urself" is a song by American musician Prince, released as a stand-alone digital single on September 30, 2015, without prior announcement. The single was released only two weeks after the physical and download release of Hit n Run Phase One, although the song is not connected to the album. The song itself had been made available two days earlier as the Tidal Purple Pick of the Week.

"Free Urself" became Prince's final single released during his lifetime, released six months before his death. The single did not chart in the United States.

== Background ==
While specific recording dates are not known, it is assumed to have been recorded in early 2015 at Paisley Park Studios in Chanhassen, Minnesota. Original art illustration worn by Prince on the single cover was created by British artist Spencer Derry.

== Critical reception ==
"Free Urself" was the last non-album single Prince released during his lifetime. Keith Creighton wrote that "it serves as an unintentional epilogue to his life and career. The theme of freedom, the importance of which he sang about decades earlier on the 1999 track "Free", potentially also alludes to the peace he made with Warner Bros. Records at this time—20 years after he infamously scrawled the word 'Slave' on his face."

Tora Borealis stated, "appreciate then the beautiful poetry that the last single he ever did release was the most positive song out of his entire canon. This bubbly ball of pop bounces buoyantly with an unstoppable force like the boulder in Raiders of the Lost Ark if it was made of pink marshmallow and really, really wanted a hug. And just when you think there’s nowhere else for it to go the vocals side step into gospel and you want it to last forever." Out of 85 singles Prince released during his lifetime, pop music critic Mikael Wood of the Los Angeles Times ranked "Free Urself" at No. 78, remarking on its reminiscence to MGMT's "Kids".
