= Louisville Leopard Percussionists =

American percussion group

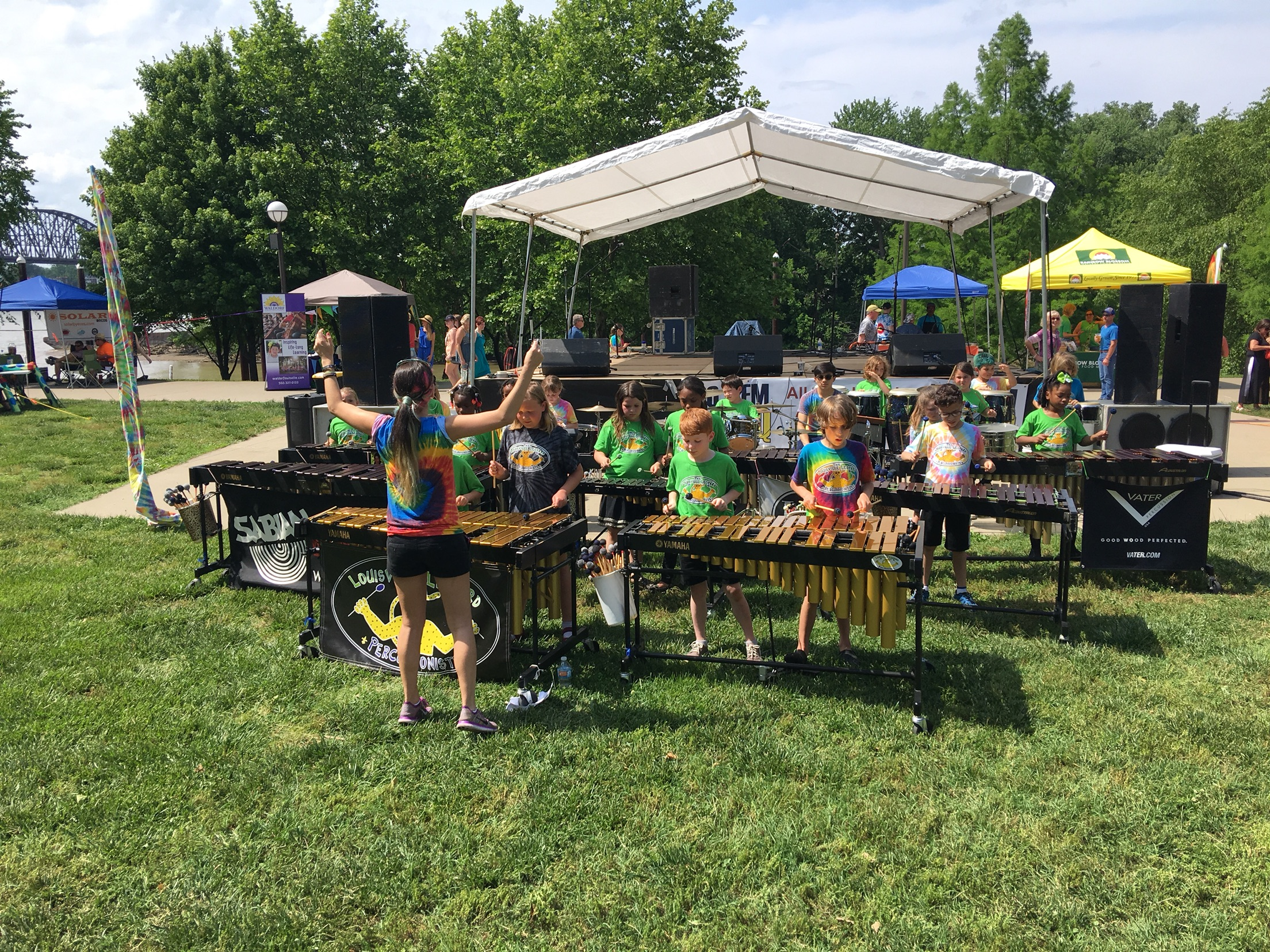
Members of the Louisville Leopard Percussionists playing in the Mighty Kindness festival at the Louisville Waterfront Park.

Louisville Leopard Percussionists is a nationally acclaimed music group for children regardless of skill level originating from Louisville, Kentucky. The group is a performing ensemble directed by Diane Downs of over 60 musicians ages 7–14, who attend different schools in and around Louisville, Kentucky. Since 1993, the Leopards have served over 450 kids in their programs. They are mostly known for covering rock and roll songs, first covering Ozzy Osbourne and Led Zeppelin. They were featured in a documentary in 2008 which was broadcast on HBO's The Leopards Take Manhattan: The Little Band That Roared.

== Notable members ==
- Hannah Welton – Drummer for 3rdeyegirl and for Prince-(band)
- Dani Markham - tour percussionist for Tune Yards and Childish Gambino
