= Hit and run (disambiguation) =

Hit and run (or hit-and-run), usually refers to the act of causing (or contributing to) a traffic accident and failing to stop and identify oneself afterwards.

Hit and run or hit n run may also refer to:

== Film ==
- Hit and Run (1924 film), a silent American comedy drama film
- Hit and Run (1957 film), a film noir starring Cleo Moore
- Hit and Run (1982 film), an American film directed by Charles Braverman
- Hit and Run (2002 film), a Canadian short film directed by Richard Jutras
- Hit and Run (2009 film), a horror film
- Hit and Run (2012 film), an action comedy starring Dax Shepard
- Hit and Run Productions, a British film company
- Hit and Run (1997), a film starring Kari Wuhrer
- Hit & Run (2019), an Indonesian film starring Joe Taslim

== Television ==
- "Hit and Run" (Modern Family), a third-season episode of Modern Family
- "Hit and Run" (NCIS), a tenth-season episode of NCIS
- "Hit and Run", a second-season episode of Strangers With Candy
- "Hit and Run", the fourth episode of the first season of ER
- Hit & Run (TV series), a TV series (2021)
- "Hit and Run" (Better Call Saul), the fourth episode of the sixth season of Better Call Saul

== Music ==
- Hit and Run (band), an American bluegrass band
- Hit n Run Tour (Kiss tour)
- Hit n Run Tour (2000), an American tour by Prince
- Hit & Run Music Publishing

=== Albums ===
- Hit & Run (Big Sugar album), 2003
- Hit and Run (Girlschool album), 1981, or the title song
- Hit and Run (T.S.O.L. album), 1987
- Hit & Run (EP), by Sloan
- Hit n Run Phase One, 2015
- Hit n Run Phase Two, 2015

=== Songs ===
- "Hit & Run", by Greyson Chance from Somewhere Over My Head
- "Hit 'n' Run" (Monrose song)
- "Hit and Run" by The Bar-Kays, from Nightcruising
- "Hit and Run" (Breathe Carolina song)
- "Hit and Run" by Kim Carnes, from Mistaken Identity
- "Hit 'N' Run" by Skazi, from Total Anarchy
- "Hit and Run", single by Lolo
- "Hit and Run" by Loleatta Holloway, from Loleatta
- "Hit and Run" (Jo Jo Zep & The Falcons song)
- "Hit and Run", by Total Contrast
- "Hit n Run", by Rose Battiste
- "Hit and Run", song by Super Furry Animals, B-side to "Demons", 1997

== Literature ==
- Hit and Run (novel), by Lurlene McDaniel
- Hit and Run, a novel by Lawrence Block
- Hit & Run: The New Zealand SAS in Afghanistan and the meaning of honour, a book by Nicky Hager and Jon Stephenson about Operation Burnham

== Other uses ==
- Hit and run (baseball)
- Hit and Run (blog)
- Hit & Run (G.I. Joe)
- Hit-and-run posting, an Internet forum tactic
- Hit-and-run tactics, a military doctrine
- The Simpsons: Hit & Run, a 2003 video game
