= Breakdown (Prince song) =

"The Breakdown"

Single by Prince

from the album Art Official Age
- Released: April 18, 2014
- Recorded: 2012
- Studio: Paisley Park, Chanhassen, Minnesota, US
- Genre: R&B
- Length: 4:04
- Label: NPG; Warner Bros.
- Songwriter(s): Prince
- Producer(s): Prince

Prince singles chronology
"Fallinlove2nite" (2014)	"The Breakdown" (2014)	"Clouds" (2014)

"Breakdown", also released as "The Breakdown", is a song by American musician Prince, released as a stand-alone digital single on April 18, 2014. The song charted Billboard the week of May 10, 2014 on their R&B Digital Song Sales peaking at number 19 and on their R&B/Hip-Hop Digital Song Sales chart, peaking at number 49.

It was made available on iTunes and Spotify just before midnight in Minneapolis, several hours after a press release announcing a major deal between Prince and Warner Bros. Records. It was made available on Amazon US on April 22, 2014, worldwide on iTunes on April 23, 2014, and worldwide on Amazon, Google Play, 7Digital and Qobuz on April 25, 2014.

The download page on iTunes reflects the new deal with Warner Bros. Records as it reads: "The copyright in this sound recording is owned by NPG Records under exclusive license to Warner Bros. Records, Inc." "The Breakdown" became Prince's first release following the announcement of his reunion with Warner Bros., more than two decades after Prince scrawled the word "slave" on his face to protest his contract with the label. As part of the new partnership, Warner Bros. will release previously unheard material and a digitally remastered, deluxe 30th anniversary edition to the 1984 soundtrack album Purple Rain.

Five months later, "The Breakdown" was included as "Breakdown" on Prince's 37th studio album Art Official Age and can be considered the album's second single (after "Breakfast Can Wait").

== Background ==
While specific recording dates are not known, basic tracking is believed to have taken place between Fall 2011 and early 2012 at Paisley Park Studios in Chanhassen, Minnesota, in the same sessions that produced "Time", "When Stars Collide" and "What It Feels Like". During 3rdEye TV Show # 4, the chat moderator announced that Donna Grantis and Hannah Ford had been recording parts for "Breakdown" that evening at Paisley Park Studios (Studio C), suggesting new recording on the track took place on June 22, 2013, although the released version seems to be identical to the one first heard in January 2013, indicating that the additional recording was not kept.

"Breakdown" (initially released as "The Breakdown") is the third track on Prince's 37th album Art Official Age, and had been released five and a half months earlier as a stand-alone single, where both the song and the single were titled "The Breakdown". The track was first heard when DJ Rashida played it prior to Prince's DJ set on January 19, 2013, Dakota Jazz Club & Restaurant, Minneapolis, Minnesota. Prince began playing the song live throughout 2013 and announced it as his favorite current song on his Arsenio Hall Show appearance in March 2014.

The song was unexpectedly released a few minutes before midnight on April 18, 2014, several hours after the announcement of a new deal with Warner Bros. Records, though the album Art Official Age was not announced at the time. The song was also included as a download for pre-orders of the album when it was announced on August 25, 2014 (along with "Clouds").

== Critical reception ==
Mirian Coleman wrote in Rolling Stone "the power ballad begins with a few stark, echoing keyboard chords before Prince's sweet falsetto enters, promising listeners that This could be the saddest story ever been told. What unfolds is a tale of excess and regret, with a lush, string-orchestrated chorus punctuated by laser sound effects.
