= New Girl season 3 =

New Girl
- Season 3
- DVD cover art
- Starring: Zooey Deschanel; Jake Johnson; Max Greenfield; Lamorne Morris; Hannah Simone
- No. of episodes: 23

Release
- Original network: Fox
- Original release: September 17, 2013 – May 6, 2014

Season chronology
- ← Previous; Season 2 Next → Season 4

The third season of the American television sitcom New Girl premiered on Fox on September 17, 2013, and concluded on May 6, 2014. Season three consists of 23 episodes. Developed by Elizabeth Meriwether under the working title Chicks & Dicks, the series revolves around offbeat teacher Jess (Zooey Deschanel) after her moving into a Los Angeles loft with three men, Nick (Jake Johnson), Schmidt (Max Greenfield), and Winston (Lamorne Morris); Jess's best friend Cece (Hannah Simone) also appears regularly. The show combines comedy and drama elements as the characters, who are in their early thirties, deal with maturing relationships and career choices.

== Production ==
In March 2013, Fox renewed New Girl for a third season. It premiered on September 17, 2013.

On May 13, 2013, Fox reported that an episode of this season will air after Super Bowl XLVIII, said episode aired along with Brooklyn Nine-Nine, which aired after it. Prince guest starred in the Super Bowl episode, "Prince", marking his first time guest starring in a television sitcom.

Initially scheduled to appear in at least four episodes, Damon Wayans Jr. returned to the show as Coach in the seventh episode and stayed for the remainder of the season as a "special guest star".

Taye Diggs guest starred in Wayans, Jr.'s returning episode, as a ladies' man who hits on Jess. Eva Amurri returned to guest star for one episode. Angela Kinsey guest starred as Rose, a teacher at Jess' new job, who clashes with Jess over her personality and work ethic. Dreama Walker also guest starred in Kinsey's introductory episode, as a teacher named Molly, who immediately takes a dislike to Jess. Jamie Lee Curtis and Rob Reiner returned as Jess' parents in the episode "Birthday". Ben Falcone also guest starred in "Birthday", and Jessica Chaffin first appeared in the episode "Longest Night Ever". Adam Brody appeared as Jess' ex-boyfriend Berkley in the episode "Exes". Linda Cardellini appeared in a three-episode arc as Jess' sister Abby, with her first episode entitled "Sister". Alexandra Daddario guest starred as Michelle, a woman who moves into the apartment building where Jess and the guys live.

== Cast and characters ==
=== Main cast ===
- Zooey Deschanel as Jessica "Jess" Day
- Jake Johnson as Nick Miller
- Max Greenfield as Schmidt
- Lamorne Morris as Winston Bishop
- Hannah Simone as Cece

=== Special guest cast ===
- Prince as Himself

=== Recurring cast ===
- Damon Wayans Jr. as Coach
- Rob Reiner as Bob Day
- Brenda Song as Daisy
- Merritt Wever as Elizabeth
- Curtis Armstrong as Principal Foster
- Angela Kinsey as Rose
- Steve Agee as Outside Dave
- Jessica Chaffin as Bertie
- Brian Posehn as Biology Teacher
- Jamie Lee Curtis as Joan Day
- Linda Cardellini as Abby Day
- Jon Lovitz as Rabbi Feiglin
- Ben Falcone as Mike
- June Diane Raphael as Sadie
- James Frecheville as Buster

=== Guest cast ===
- Dreama Walker as Molly
- Eva Amurri Martino as Beth
- Mark Proksch as Dan
- Alice Wetterlund as Hostess
- Riki Lindhome as Kylie
- Derek Waters as Mike
- Jillian Armenante as Eileen
- Marty Ingels as Pickled Patron
- Taye Diggs as Artie
- Gillian Vigman as Kim
- Bob Gunton as Ed
- Josh Gad as Bearclaw
- Clayton Kershaw as Himself
- Alessandra Ambrosio as Herself
- Ana Beatriz Barros as Herself
- Lais Ribero as Herself
- Adam Brody as Berkley
- Mary Elizabeth Ellis as Caroline
- Tiffany Haddish as Leslie
- Alexandra Daddario as Michelle
- Kerri Kenney-Silver as Captain Jan Nortis
- Oscar Nuñez as Doug

== Episodes ==
| No. overall | No. in season | Title | Directed by | Written by | Original release date | Prod. code | U.S. viewers (millions) |
|---|---|---|---|---|---|---|---|
| 50 | 1 | "All In" | Max Winkler | Elizabeth Meriwether | September 17, 2013 | 3ATM01 | 5.53 |
After Cece's wedding, Nick and Jess flee to Mexico for some alone time and Nick ends up in trouble with the law. Meanwhile, back home, Schmidt cannot bring himself to decide between Cece and Elizabeth and Winston has trouble assembling a jigsaw puzzle.
| 51 | 2 | "Nerd" | Fred Goss | Kay Cannon | September 24, 2013 | 3ATM02 | 4.04 |
With Nick's help, Jess tries to fit in with a group of cool teachers Molly, Rose and Dan (Dreama Walker, Angela Kinsey and Mark Proksch), by sneaking in to use their principal's Dr. Foster's (Curtis Armstrong) hot tub. Schmidt has to deal with both Cece and Elizabeth attending a party at his job, while he is still dating them both, while also dealing with his co-worker Beth (Eva Amurri) trying to sabotage things for him. Winston is left taking care of Daisy's (Brenda Song) cat Furguson, after deciding that he wants to date her exclusively, even though she is already sexually active with another guy.
| 52 | 3 | "Double Date" | Max Winkler | Luvh Rakhe | October 1, 2013 | 3ATM03 | 3.85 |
Nick finds out about Schmidt dating both Cece and Elizabeth, and has a hard time keeping the secret to himself. Winston is left the responsibility of reserving a table for the gang at a restaurant.
| 53 | 4 | "The Captain" | Fred Goss | J. J. Philbin | October 8, 2013 | 3ATM04 | 3.96 |
Schmidt plots to break up Jess and Nick, just as they are about to celebrate dating for a month. Winston tries to get Furguson to have sex with a female cat before being neutered. He meets a woman called Kylie (Riki Lindhome) who has a cat named Fatty. He brings Kylie and Fatty back to the apartment. She thinks he wants her, and leaves in disappointed anger when she finds out that he only wanted her cat for his cat.
| 54 | 5 | "The Box" | Andy Fleming | Rob Rosell | October 15, 2013 | 3ATM05 | 3.45 |
Nick becomes irresponsible with the money from his late father's estate, so Jess uses some of the money to pay Nick's unpaid bills, behind his back. With Nick's improved financial situation, Winston feels its finally time to ask Nick for the money he owes him. Still feeling guilty about hurting Cece and Elizabeth, Schmidt seeks advice from Rabbi Feiglin (Jon Lovitz) and then saves the life of Mike (Derek Waters), a bike messenger who nearly choked on his gum.
| 55 | 6 | "Keaton" | David Katzenberg | Dave Finkel & Brett Baer | October 22, 2013 | 3ATM06 | 3.74 |
Schmidt receives a series of recent e-mails from his favorite actor Michael Keaton, who has sent letters to him ever since he was a kid. However, it turns out those letters and e-mails were not from the actor but from Schmidt's mother and Nick, posing as Keaton. Cece indulges in nightly parties to get over her break up with Schmidt.
| 56 | 7 | "Coach" | Russ Alsobrook | David Feeney | November 5, 2013 | 3ATM07 | 3.85 |
Coach (Damon Wayans, Jr.) visits the apartment to spend a "guys night out" with the guys, after breaking up with his girlfriend. Nick going to a strip club with the guys, and telling her that they haven't had a conversation about whether or not they're boyfriend/girlfriend or are exclusive, upsets Jess to the point that she has "girls night out" with Cece at the bar. While at the bar, Jess gets hit on by Artie (Taye Diggs), the owner of a coffee shop that she frequently goes to.
| 57 | 8 | "Menus" | Trent O'Donnell | Matt Fusfeld & Alex Cuthbertson | November 12, 2013 | 3ATM08 | 3.36 |
After being denied permission to take her class to the beach, Jess focuses her attention on fighting Brian (Justin Chon), a Chinese restaurant owner who floods the apartment with his restaurant menus. Coach tries to get Nick in shape, Winston also tries to get involved in their workout, but keeps getting hurt. Schmidt starts to feel left out by the gang, now that he lives across the hall from them and Coach has moved into his room.
| 58 | 9 | "Longest Night Ever" | Nicholas Jasenovec | Ryan Koh | November 19, 2013 | 3ATM09 | 3.26 |
Schmidt becomes jealous when Coach and Cece go on a date, with Jess being left the responsibility of calming his nerves while the date is taking place. Nick accidentally loses Furguson, while Winston goes out. The cat is later found by Bertie (Jessica Chaffin), a woman that Winston becomes instantly attracted to.
| 59 | 10 | "Thanksgiving III" | Max Winkler | Josh Malmuth | November 26, 2013 | 3ATM10 | 3.51 |
To prove to Coach that Nick still has a secure manhood while dating Jess, the gang has Thanksgiving in the wilderness.
| 60 | 11 | "Clavado En Un Bar" | Eric Appel | Berkley Johnson | January 7, 2014 | 3ATM11 | 3.20 |
Jess gets a job offer to work at a museum and has minutes to make her decision to take the job or not. The gang also helps her on her decision.
| 61 | 12 | "Basketsball" | Lorene Scafaria | Rebecca Addelman | January 14, 2014 | 3ATM13 | 3.24 |
Jess tries to become good friends with Coach by watching Detroit Pistons games with him and becoming a Pistons "fan". However Jess' "fandom" starts to interfere with her relationship with Nick, who is a lifelong Chicago Bulls fan. Winston agrees to shadow Schmidt at his marketing job, where Schmidt is later asked to guide Ed (Bob Gunton), a sixty-something intern, to avoid a company lawsuit over age discrimination.
| 62 | 13 | "Birthday" | Richie Keen | Kim Rosenstock | January 21, 2014 | 3ATM12 | 3.75 |
Its Jess' birthday, with Nick planning out the entire day. Schmidt helps Cece be a better bartender, while she is continually being ridiculed by her co-worker Mike (Ben Falcone). Coach and Winston compete to bake the perfect birthday cake for Jess.
| 63 | 14 | "Prince" | Fred Goss | David Feeney & Rob Rosell | February 2, 2014 | 3ATM15 | 26.30 |
Jess and Cece are invited to a party at a mansion held by Prince. Nick blurts out that he loves Jess, with Jess giving an unexpected response. As a result, Nick and the guys try to get into Prince's mansion so Nick can set the record straight with Jess.
| 64 | 15 | "Exes" | Alex Hardcastle | Nina Pedrad | February 4, 2014 | 3ATM14 | 3.48 |
Jess tries to prove to Nick that exes can still be friends, by introducing him to her ex-boyfriend Berkley (Adam Brody). Caroline (Mary Elizabeth Ellis) returns, wanting an explanation from Nick for why he left her. Schmidt finally finishes decorating his new apartment, and then agrees to have Coach and Winston use it whenever they please.
| 65 | 16 | "Sister" | Max Winkler | Matt Fusfeld & Alex Cuthbertson | February 11, 2014 | 3ATM16 | 2.97 |
Jess is asked by her mother to pick up her troublesome older sister Abby (Linda Cardellini) from jail. Jess also tries to prevent Nick from meeting Abby, because of her sister's unruly behavior. Meanwhile, Nick accompanies Schmidt to a Bar Mitzvah, so Schmidt can go on a date with Rachael (Allyn Rachel), who is the daughter of Rabbi Feiglin, who dislikes Schmidt. Cece and Coach are the only ones that attend a soup dinner party held by Winston and Birdie.
| 66 | 17 | "Sister II" | Bill Purple | Ryan Koh & Luvh Rakhe | February 25, 2014 | 3ATM17 | 2.84 |
When Abby announces that she is staying in the loft permanently, Jess then goes to find a safe place for Abby to live. Nick is then left to baby-sit Abby, while Jess looks for Abby's new place. Winston is nervous about looking at the results of his LAPD entrance exam.
| 67 | 18 | "Sister III" | Jay Chandrasekhar | Camilla Blackett | March 4, 2014 | 3ATM18 | 2.93 |
Schmidt and Abby are now dating, with Abby also living in Schmidt's place. Feeling jealous about Schmidt and Abby's relationship, Jess decides to move into Nick's room, however, the living arrangement does not make either one of them happy. Cece begins treating Coach as just a friend, to the point that Coach begins acting feminine. Winston tries to get into physical shape to ace the LAPD obstacle course.
| 68 | 19 | "Fired Up" | Steve Welch | Sophia Lear | March 11, 2014 | 3ATM19 | 2.48 |
Jess gets Coach a coaching job at her school, she must then fire him for budget reasons, after being promoted to vice principal. Schmidt gets sued and has Nick (who passed his bar exam and was referred to as "Slippin Miller" in his college days) and Winston (who loves legal procedural shows), to represent him in a deposition. Cece gets hit on by a younger Australian guy named Buster (James Frecheville).
| 69 | 20 | "Mars Landing" | Lynn Shelton | Josh Malmuth & Nina Pedrad | March 25, 2014 | 3ATM20 | 2.49 |
Still hung over from playing a game of True American the night before, Jess and Nick have a serious argument about their future together. Coach, Schmidt and Winston compete to get the attention of two attractive neighbors Michelle and Laurie (Alexandra Daddario and Stevie Nelson), who are moving into the building. Cece accidentally drunk texts Buster.
| 70 | 21 | "Big News" | Steven Tsuchida | Berkley Johnson & Kim Rosenstock | April 15, 2014 | 3ATM21 | 2.19 |
Jess and Nick deal with the aftermath of their break up. Nick tries to not think about the break up by planning a "honey roast" for Winston to celebrate the news of him passing his police academy entrance exam. Jess seeks comfort from Cece, even though Cece is busy studying for her GED exam with help from Schmidt.
| 71 | 22 | "Dance" | Trent O'Donnell | Rebecca Addelman & Ryan Koh | April 29, 2014 | 3ATM22 | 2.20 |
Jess is in charge of the school dance, but the teachers that she has recruited to chaperone bail, leaving Jess to call Cece and the guys to chaperone instead.
| 72 | 23 | "Cruise" | Elizabeth Meriwether | Luvh Rakhe & Rob Rosell | May 6, 2014 | 3ATM23 | 2.40 |
The gang goes on a cruise that Jess and Nick booked when they were still dating. During the trip, Coach deals with his fear of boats; Schmidt tries to get Cece back; and Winston attempts to reconcile Jess and Nick's friendship.
