= New Girl season 2 =

Season of television series

New Girl
- Season 2
- DVD cover art
- Starring: Zooey Deschanel; Jake Johnson; Max Greenfield; Lamorne Morris; Hannah Simone
- No. of episodes: 25

Release
- Original network: Fox
- Original release: September 25, 2012 – May 14, 2013

Season chronology
- ← Previous; Season 1 Next → Season 3

The second season of the American television sitcom New Girl premiered on Fox on September 25, 2012, and concluded on May 14, 2013, consisting of 25 episodes. Developed by Elizabeth Meriwether under the working title Chicks & Dicks, the series revolves around offbeat teacher Jess (Zooey Deschanel) after her moving into a Los Angeles loft with three men, Nick (Jake Johnson), Schmidt (Max Greenfield), and Winston (Lamorne Morris); Jess's best friend Cece (Hannah Simone) also appears regularly. The show combines comedy and drama elements as the characters, who are in their early thirties, deal with maturing relationships and career choices.

== Production ==
On April 9, 2012, Fox renewed New Girl for a second season, which premiered on September 25, 2012. Parker Posey guest starred as a "shot girl" at a party thrown by Schmidt in the season premiere episode "Re-Launch"; Leslie Mann was originally cast in the role, but pulled out due to a scheduling conflict. Raymond J. Barry guest starred as "Old Nick" — an older drunk man who frequents Nick's bar, claiming to be Nick — from the future. Niecy Nash, David Walton and Eric Winter all signed on as guest stars for the second season. However, Walton was the only actor out of three that appeared in the series, he appeared in a recurring role as Jess' love interest, Sam, first appearing in the episode "Katie". Rachael Harris reprised her role as Jess' boss, Tanya Lamontagne in episode "Re-Launch". Maria Thayer guest starred as Amelia in the Halloween episode, a woman from Nick's college days. Carla Gugino guest starred in a three-episode stint as Schmidt's new boss, Emma. Jamie Lee Curtis and Rob Reiner guest starred as Jess' parents in the Thanksgiving episode. Rob Riggle also guest starred as Schmidt's cousin in the Thanksgiving episode. Olivia Munn guest starred in a three-episode arc as Angie, a love interest for Nick. Brenda Song appeared in a recurring role as Daisy, a love interest for Winston. Brooklyn Decker also guest starred in Song's introductory episode, appearing as Holly. Nate Corddry also guest starred in an episode. Odette Annable guest starred as Nick's new boss and love interest, Shane, in the episode "Quick Hardening Caulk"; It was previously reported that Annable's role would be recurring, however, she only appeared in one episode. Margo Martindale, Nick Kroll and Bill Burr guest starred as Nick's mother, brother and cousin, respectively. Dermot Mulroney reprised his role as Russell from the previous season. Merritt Wever played Elizabeth, Schmidt's old girlfriend from college, in the last four episodes of the season. Taylor Swift guest starred in the season finale "Elaine's Big Day", playing the episode's titular character.

== Cast and characters ==
=== Main cast ===
- Zooey Deschanel as Jessica "Jess" Day
- Jake Johnson as Nick Miller
- Max Greenfield as Schmidt
- Lamorne Morris as Winston Bishop
- Hannah Simone as Cece

=== Recurring cast ===
- Rachael Harris as Tanya Lamontagne
- Kali Hawk as Shelby
- Dermot Mulroney as Russell
- Nelson Franklin as Robby
- David Walton as Sam
- Carla Gugino as Emma
- Rob Reiner as Bob Day
- Olivia Munn as Angie
- Brenda Song as Daisy
- Satya Bhabha as Shivrang
- Merritt Weaver as Elizabeth

=== Guest cast ===
- Parker Posey as Casey
- Anna Maria Horsford as Charmaine
- Raymond J. Barry as Old Nick
- Josh Gad as Bearclaw
- Rebecca Reid as Nadia
- James M. Connor as Gary
- Maria Thayer as Amelia
- Molly Cheek as Marion
- Jamie Lee Curtis as Joan Day
- Rob Riggle as Big Schmidt
- June Diane Raphael as Sadie
- Kay Cannon as Melissa
- Jeff Kober as Remy
- Dennis Farina as Walt Miller
- Nate Corddry as Edgar
- Brooklyn Decker as Holly
- Steve Agee as Outside Dave
- Steve Howey as Jax McTavish
- Odette Annable as Shane
- Margo Martindale as Bonnie
- Ellen Albertini Dow as Aunt Ruthie
- Bill Burr as Bobby
- Nick Kroll as Jamie
- Lauren Weedman as Mysteria
- Carla Renata as Octopussy
- Dylan O'Brien as The Guy
- Curtis Armstrong as Dr. Foster
- Mary Lynn Rajskub as Peg
- Taylor Swift as Elaine
- Ajay Mehta as Priest

== Episodes ==
No. overall	No. in season	Title	Directed by	Written by	Original release date	Prod. code	U.S. viewers (millions)
25	1	"Re-Launch"	Steve Pink	Kay Cannon	September 25, 2012	2ATM01	5.35
Jess is laid off from her teaching job. Schmidt throws a party at Nick's bar, in celebration of his penis cast being removed. A new side of Winston is revealed after he drinks some of Nick's fruity concoctions. Cece introduces her new boyfriend, Robby (Nelson Franklin), to Schmidt.
26	2	"Katie"	Larry Charles	Elizabeth Meriwether	September 25, 2012	2ATM02	5.18
Jess meets Sam (David Walton), a handsome stranger who thinks she is Katie, his blind date. She pretends to be Katie and takes him back to the loft. A regular (Raymond J. Barry) at Nick's bar claims he is Nick from the future and amazes Nick with some insights. When Winston's mother Charmaine (Anna Maria Horsford) and sister Alisha (Keenyah Hill) visit, Schmidt is determined to hook up with Alisha.
27	3	"Fluffer"	Fred Goss	J. J. Philbin	October 2, 2012	2ATM04	4.99
Winston tells Nick that Jess is only using him as a fluffer. That is, Jess gets him to do many boyfriend-like things for Jess, but, unlike a boyfriend, he does not get any sex with her. Winston helps Schmidt get into a nightclub by having Schmidt pretend to be Tugg Romney, a fictional son of Mitt Romney's, and the scheme attracts a few sorority girls, who later that night realise that he is lying. As Winston and Shelby have not had sex for many weeks, Winston becomes concerned about whether he is psychologically cheating when he fantasizes about having sex with other women.
28	4	"Neighbors"	Steve Pink	Berkley Johnson	October 9, 2012	2ATM03	4.94
Jess is able to easily impress their new neighbors - a trendy group twentysomething slackers - by doing impressions of Steve Urkel and other television sitcom characters. The group take an immediate disliking to Schmidt, who think they are writing him off as old. They tell him that the real reason is that they hate his personality. Nick works extra hard to pull an elaborate prank on Schmidt.
29	5	"Models"	Eric Appel	Josh Malmuth	October 23, 2012	2ATM05	5.16
During Cece's birthday, Jess is so frustrated by Cece's model friends that she insults Cece's modeling life. Jess tries to make up with Cece, but when Cece is not physically presentable for her modeling gig, Jess tries to model in her place. When Schmidt gifts Nick a cookie, he feels insulted and upset that Nick does not care about him or think of him at all, so Nick has to do something about that.
30	6	"Halloween"	Jesse Peretz	David Iserson	October 30, 2012	2ATM06	4.75
Jess begins to have genuine feelings for Sam as more than a sexual partner, especially after seeing him work as a pediatrician during the day. Nick meets with Amelia (Maria Thayer), a girl he knew from college that he did not have a chance to date back then. Nick later goes into a haunted house, despite being completely scared of them. Schmidt intrudes on Cece and Robby's Halloween date. Winston breaks up with Shelby after they have a disagreement over her Halloween costume.
31	7	"Menzies"	Jason Woliner	Kim Rosenstock	November 13, 2012	2ATM07	4.35
Still unable to find a new job, Jess blames her problems on premenstrual syndrome. Winston also thinks he is suffering from PMS, even though he is a man. After hanging out with Tran (Ralph Ahn), a quiet old man in the park who listens to Nick and just smiles back at him, Nick becomes less angry. Schmidt agrees to sign a sex contract with his new boss Emma (Carla Gugino). Cece is disappointed that Robby thinks of her as a "nice girl".
32	8	"Parents"	Jesse Peretz	Ryan Koh	November 20, 2012	2ATM08	4.11
Jess' divorced parents, Joan and Bob (Jamie Lee Curtis and Rob Reiner), come over to the apartment for Thanksgiving; Jess tries to get them back together despite numerous failed Parent Trap-like attempts in the past. Schmidt's cousin (Rob Riggle), also named Schmidt, comes over, spurring a manly competition between the two with Winston as the judge and the winner getting the rights to be called Schmidt.
33	9	"Eggs"	Neal Brennan	Kay Cannon	November 27, 2012	2ATM09	4.12
Jess and Cece are advised by Jess's lesbian gynecologist friend Sadie to have a health check on their ovarian reserves (how much longer they have to produce viable eggs for children). While Jess's test results turn out fine, Cece becomes concerned she is running out of time. Schmidt is disappointed by being unable to satisfy Emma during intercourse. Nick attempts to work on his zombie novel.
34	10	"Bathtub"	Tristram Shapeero	Donick Cary	December 4, 2012	2ATM10	4.10
Tired of taking showers, Jess proposes the gang buy a bathtub, but Nick and Schmidt reject the idea. Winston later joins Jess to purchase a tub to place on the roof but it breaks partly through, spilling water on Schmidt's suits. They attempt to fool Schmidt by staging a robbery, which they think has worked - until Schmidt reveals he has camera surveillance. Nick tries to hook up with Angie (Olivia Munn), a bar patron who was drinking alone, having fought with her hot-headed boyfriend. When Cece mentions she has broken up with Robby, Schmidt tries to win her back, but he has to deal with Emma first.
35	11	"Santa"	Craig Zisk	Luvh Rakhe	December 11, 2012	2ATM11	4.18
The gang attends several Christmas parties on Christmas Eve. Sam tries to win Jess back. Nick is intimidated by Angie being very sexually adventurous in public. Schmidt rejects Cece's Christmas gift after she denies him after he proclaimed his love for her.
36	12	"Cabin"	Alec Berg	J. J. Philbin	January 8, 2013	2ATM12	3.78
Jess asks Nick and Angie to come along on a cabin trip with her and Sam. Schmidt feels Winston is holding back on his "blackness", so he agrees to spend the day doing things that Winston wants to do.
37	13	"A Father's Love"	Jake Kasdan	Berkley Johnson & Josh Malmuth	January 15, 2013	2ATM13	3.65
Nick's con man father, Walt (Dennis Farina), visits. Nick is disappointed because he realises that Walt is in town to pull off another scam, but this one involving a horse. Walt tricks Jess into being involved in the scam. The scam is foiled by Nick's anxiety. Schmidt and Robbie team up to try to win Cece back.
38	14	"Pepperwood"	Lynn Shelton	Nick Adams	January 22, 2013	2ATM14	4.05
Nick thinks that Edgar (Nate Corddry), a student in Jess' creative writing class, is a psychopathic killer - because of the violent stories he writes and pictures he draws. Jess and Nick go to Edgar's house and discover that the stories have no relation to his real-life personality. Schmidt and Winston try to find from each other what is being said about them when they are not in the room.
39	15	"Cooler"	Max Winkler	Rebecca Addelman	January 29, 2013	2ATM15	4.74
Nick, Schmidt and Winston try to get lucky with women by spending a "guys' night out" at the bar, while Jess is in the apartment alone. Nick and Schmidt compete to get the attention of Holly (Brooklyn Decker), a woman who is sexually attracted to sadness, while Winston spends time with Daisy (Brenda Song), a woman helping him to be comfortable speaking to women again.
40	16	"Table 34"	Tristram Shapeero	David Iserson	February 5, 2013	2ATM16	4.83
The gang attends an Indian marriage convention with Cece, where she hopes to find her future husband. While there, Schmidt once again tries to win Cece back. Jess and Nick try to discuss the intimate moment they shared the night before. Anu (Meera Simhan), the head of the marriage convention hits on Winston.
41	17	"Parking Spot"	Fred Goss	Rebecca Addelman	February 19, 2013	2ATM17	4.31
Schmidt finds an extra parking spot, but the four roommates fight over who gets to use it. At first it appears to be a showdown between Schmidt and Jess where they try to convince Nick to award the spot, but then changes to whoever can get their car to the spot first and whoever can stay at the spot the longest. Jess and Nick also work through the effect of their kiss on the relationship dynamics in the apartment, and Winston goes on a trek to find a condom with which to have sex with Daisy. He eventually gets one, but then cannot find his way back to Daisy's apartment.
42	18	"TinFinity"	Max Winkler	Kim Rosenstock & Josh Malmuth	February 26, 2013	2ATM18	4.29
Schmidt and Nick throw a party to celebrate being roommates for ten years, but Nick has trouble with his assignment of getting portable toilets. Winston becomes good friends with Jax McTavish (Steve Howey), a football player to which Jess becomes attracted. Cece and Shivrang (Satya Bhabha) begin to question their relationship leading up to their arranged marriage.
43	19	"Quick Hardening Caulk"	Lorene Scafaria	Story by : Brett Baer & Dave Finkel; Teleplay by : Ryan Koh	March 19, 2013	2ATM19	4.26
Jess becomes sexually attracted to Nick when she sees that he is applying himself more at his bartending job. However, Jess does not know that Nick is only acting this way because he is dating his new boss, Shane (Odette Annable). Schmidt is inspired to acquire a lionfish, which everyone else interprets as pining for Cece. He gets Winston to help him catch one in the ocean.
44	20	"Chicago"	Jake Kasdan	Luvh Rakhe	March 26, 2013	2ATM20	4.19
Jess, Schmidt and Winston travel with Nick to his hometown Chicago to help with his father's funeral arrangements. While there, they meet Nick's eccentric family: his mother (Margo Martindale), brother (Nick Kroll), cousin (Bill Burr) and grandmother (Ellen Albertini Dow). Jess is asked to write a eulogy, while Winston helps Schmidt overcome his fear of death.
45	21	"First Date"	Lynn Shelton	J. J. Philbin & Berkley Johnson	April 4, 2013	2ATM22	4.77
Nick musters up the courage to go on a first date with Jess, but the actual date causes confusing feelings for the both of them. While at the restaurant for their date, they accidentally run into Jess' ex-boyfriend Russell (Dermot Mulroney) and his date. Feeling that the roommate dynamic will be ruined if Jess and Nick become a couple, Schmidt and Winston plot to stop it from happening.
46	22	"Bachelorette Party"	Matt Sohn	Kay Cannon & Sophia Lear	April 9, 2013	2ATM21	4.09
Jess plans a surprise bachelorette party for Cece. Meanwhile, Nick and Winston spend some "guy time" with Shivrang. Schmidt is offended that he did not get a plus one invitation to Cece's wedding, so he sets out to find his plus one, including stopping at the door of his college ex-girlfriend, Elizabeth (Merritt Wever). Cece feels the wedding is happening too soon and she is disappointed to have not seen Shivrang's penis. Cece asks Jess to be her maid-of-honor, which she accepts.
47	23	"Virgins"	Alec Berg	Elizabeth Meriwether	April 30, 2013	2ATM23	3.57
The gang reminisce about losing their virginities, and have a contest about who had the worst experience.
48	24	"Winston's Birthday (Part One)"	Max Winkler	Brett Baer & Dave Finkel	May 7, 2013	2ATM24	3.94
Jess' dad, Bob (Rob Reiner), visits the apartment the day after Jess and Nick spend the night together. Schmidt is embarrassed to mention to other people that Elizabeth is his girlfriend. Winston spends the day hoping his friends remember that it is his birthday.
49	25	"Elaine's Big Day"	Jake Kasdan	Christian Magalhães & Bob Snow	May 14, 2013	2ATM25	4.07
Cece's wedding day arrives. Schmidt and Winston plan to sabotage the wedding after Schmidt has an "eye conversation" with Cece, where she apparently tells him that she is wanting to back out of the wedding. Jess and Nick become conflicted about their past, increasingly feeling that their relationship is a mistake. Shivrang's ex, Elaine (Taylor Swift) interrupts the wedding and they leave together, spurring Cece to confessing her true feelings for Schmidt. While leaving the wedding, Jess begs Nick not to give up on their relationship upon which he kisses her and they drive away into the night.

== Reception ==
On review aggregator website Rotten Tomatoes, the season holds an approval rating of 88% based on 16 reviews, with an average rating of 6.56/10. The site's critical consensus reads, "New Girl's terrific ensemble cast remains its most valuable asset, and the show is buoyed by a deeper, more relatable central performance from lead Zooey Deschanel in its sophomore season."
