= Fluffer =

One who keeps a pornographic actor's penis erect on-set

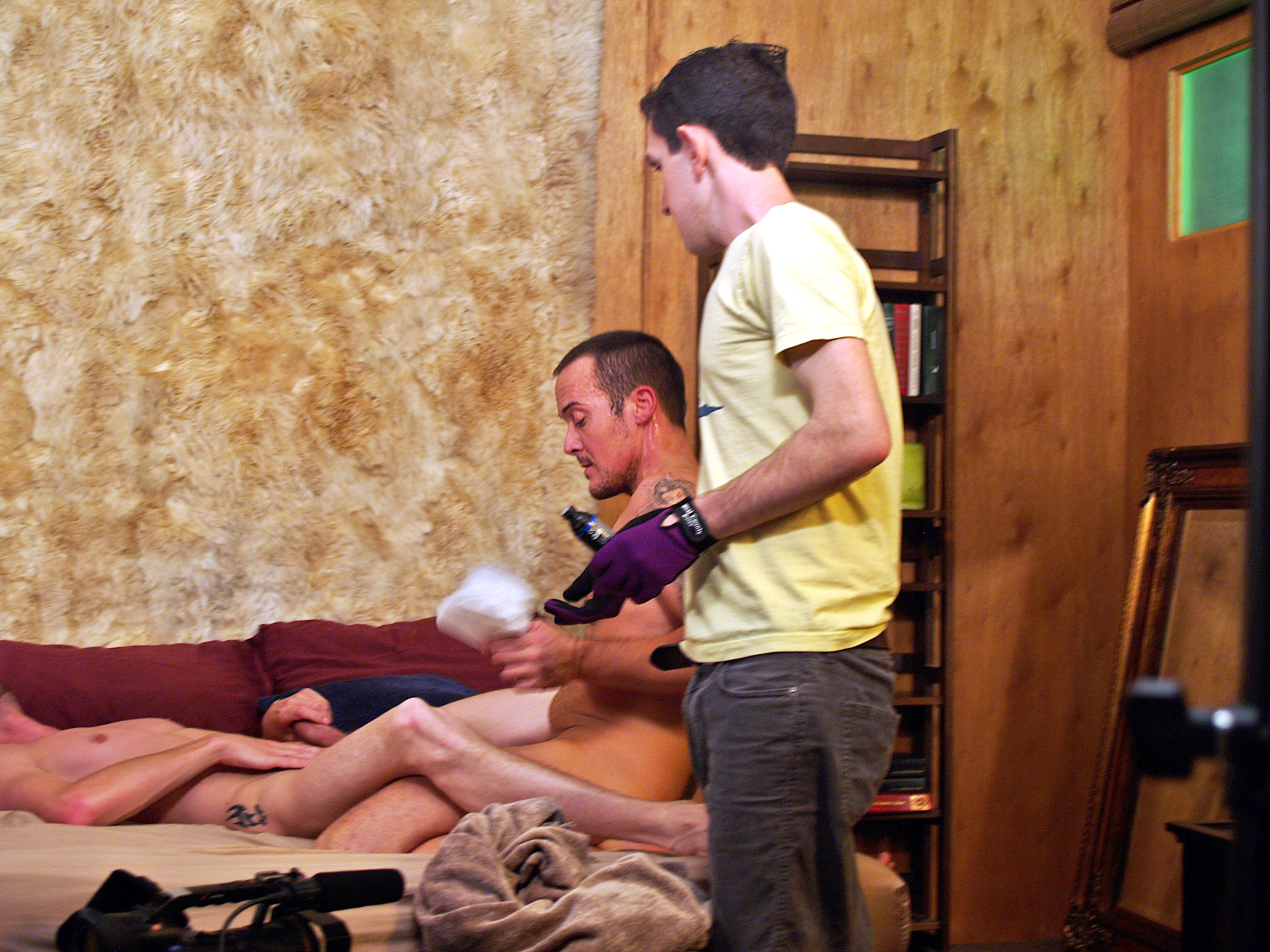
A fluffer on set of a gay pornographic movie.

A fluffer is a person employed to keep a porn performer's penis erect on the set. After setting up the desired angle, the director asks the actors to hold position and calls for the fluffer to "fluff" the actors for the shot. These duties are considered part of the makeup department. While fluffing does not necessarily involve touching the actors, it could entail sexual acts such as fellatio or non-penetrative sex.

According to some pornographic actors, including Aurora Snow, James Deen and Keiran Lee, fluffers are no longer needed, saying that the role might have existed in the past, but disappeared due to medical advancements, such as Viagra and implants, and with advancements in prosthetics. Hunter Skott, who has worked as a fluffer, contended in an interview that they "are only used for a gangbang or bukkake, not for regular [porn] movies".

Film scholar Charles Burnetts, writing about the James Bond films, uses the term to describe members of a group of women in the films whom Bond seduces earlier in the movie but who disappear by the end and serve only to keep the male "agent" aroused until the arrival of the primary sexual object, the Bond girl. In particular, Burnetts states that the character of May Day from A View to a Kill, played by actress Grace Jones, "serves as a high-watermark for the fluffer character".

Predating the pornographic usage, which came into use in the 1970s, fluffer has been used by the real estate industry to refer to a person who stages homes and as a term for a maid or housekeeper who fluffs pillows, or in general cleans and prepares work equipment.

== In popular culture ==
In the 1998 video game Fallout 2, it is possible for the player to become a fluffer for a post-apocalyptic studio engaged in the porn industry.

The 2001 film The Fluffer is about a film buff with a crush on a porn star who is straight, for whom he would end up working as a fluffer in gay porn.

A major plot point of the 2001 episode Fluff Daddy from the science-fiction series Lexx features the starship captain Stanley Tweedle agreeing to become a fluffer at a porn studio in Kennebunkport, Maine, not understanding what a fluffer does.

In episode 3 of season 2 of New Girl entitled "Fluffer", Nick Miller tells the protagonist Jessica Day that he will not be her "emotional fluffer", after he realises that he is providing her sentimental stimulation which allows her to maintain a more active sex life with a recurring character named Sam Sweeney.

The oneiric slasher Knife+Heart follows a group of "low grade" gay pornographers in 1970s France. The film depicts a character named Mouth of Gold, or Mouth, who is a fluffer. In the film, he is a middle-aged man who works for free as he lives with his mother.

In the first book of the Off Campus series by Elle Kennedy (The Deal), protagonist Garrett Graham accuses romantic interest Hannah Wells of treating him like a fluffer when he finds out she agreed to going on a date with someone else (Justin Kohl), just after Garrett becomes the first guy who has been able to give her an orgasm. Garrett decided he wants to move their casual "fake dating" arrangement to something official, Hannah hesitates.

== See also ==
- Erection
