= Sons & Daughters (2006 TV series) =

- Genre: Sitcom
- Created by: Fred Goss; Nick Holly
- Starring: Fred Goss; Gillian Vigman; Jerry Lambert; Alison Quinn; Max Gail; Dee Wallace-Stone; Amanda Walsh; Desmond Harrington
- Composers: Bill Berry; Adam Gorgoni
- Country of origin: United States
- Original language: English
- No. of seasons: 1
- No. of episodes: 11 (1 unaired)

Production
- Executive producers: Lorne Michaels; Fred Goss; Nick Holly; JoAnn Alfano
- Camera setup: Single-camera
- Running time: 30 minutes
- Production companies: Broadway Video; NBCUniversal Television Studio

Original release
- Network: ABC
- Release: March 7 – April 4, 2006

Sons & Daughters is an American sitcom television series about an extended blended family living close together in a neighborhood. The producers, creator Fred Goss (who also is the star of the show), Lorne Michaels (who was a co-creator of Saturday Night Live), and Nick Holly, flavored the show with a mixed atmosphere of improvisational and scripted humor. The show premiered on March 7, 2006, on ABC. The show is produced by Broadway Video (which also produces Saturday Night Live) and NBC Universal Television. It was canceled in late April 2006 after 10 episodes aired, leaving one unaired episode.

The whole series was aired on the Seven Network in Australia, including the final previously unaired episode, ending on August 6, 2007. Coincidentally, the Seven Network also screened the earlier Australian soap opera of the same name. In December 2010, ITV1 started showing the series in the United Kingdom for the first time, over four years since its American showing. The show has also been aired on TV3 in Ireland.

== Improvisational aspect ==
Sons & Daughters has been dubbed a "unique hybrid comedy"; the show followed the format used in Curb Your Enthusiasm, using a partly scripted, partly improvisational comedy dialogue. In an interview with co-creator Nick Holly from the Associated Press, he explained that the actors were presented not with a traditional script, but with a "short story" that "occasionally includes a line or two of dialogue, but is normally just this novelization."

Unlike the traditional sitcom, Sons & Daughters was not filmed with a live studio audience and did not use a laugh track for the show.

== Plot synopsis ==
Cameron Walker's (Goss) world revolves around him and his extended family living in Hamilton, Ohio, which includes wife Liz (Vigman), his son Ezra (Matthews), his daughter Marni (Jourdain) and his son Henry (Einhorn) who Cameron didn't know existed, his mother and stepfather, Colleen and Wendal Halbert (Wallace-Stone, Gail), and his other plethora of brothers and sisters. He is considered the only sane person in his family and tries to fix any problem that arises within the family.

Cameron's sister and brother-in-law Sharon (Quinn) and Don Fenton (Lambert) seem to create more problems for him rather than themselves. The couple are almost always in deep denial about their personal issues, such as not having sex for several years.

Jenna (Walsh), Sharon and Cameron's half-sister, is a single mother of one who is continuously attracted to the "bad boy" personality, such as "Whitey" (Pitts), and steers away from the "nice guy" types, like Wylie (Harrington).

Their parents, Colleen and Wendal, love their family but have profound complications within their own relationship. Cameron constantly tries to help them solve their issues, but it doesn't always work out the way he expects.

== Episodes ==
Below is the entire list of episodes from the series including a brief description.

No.	Title	Directed by	Written by	Original release date	Prod. code	Viewers (millions)
1	"Anniversary Party"	Fred Goss	Fred Goss & Nick Holly	March 7, 2006	101	8.41
Cameron throws a 25th anniversary party for Colleen and Wendal which turns out to be a disaster. Meanwhile, Sharon and Don struggle with intimacy issues, which their children soon become all too aware of.
2	"Bowling Night"	Fred Goss	Fred Goss & Nick Holly	March 7, 2006	102	7.50
Colleen learns the truth about Wendal's plan, and confronts him at their traditional bowling night. Meanwhile, Sharon and Don attempt to improve their sexless marriage, which have disappointing results.
3	"Film Festival"	Fred Goss	Nick Holly & Fred Goss	March 14, 2006	103	5.38
In an effort to support their awkward son Henry, Cameron and the family attend his school film festival, despite Henry's wishes. Upon watching the film, it becomes painfully obvious why he didn't want them there in the first place. Meanwhile, younger sister Jenna tries to prove to Cameron that she is a "grown-up."
4	"BBQ Therapy"	David Steinberg	Story by : Fred Goss & Nick Holly; Teleplay by : Wil Calhoun	March 14, 2006	104	4.91
Cameron throws his annual barbecue, which quickly becomes a comedy of errors with one miscommunication after another among family members turning what should be a fun family get-together into a group therapy session.
5	"Family Finance"	David Steinberg	Justin Adler	March 21, 2006	105	4.52
When Sharon lends money to Cameron, Cameron learns that the act comes with ulterior motives. At the same time, Henry opts to confide in his stepmother, Liz, about a personal problem, instead of his own father, which angers Cameron. Whitey gets a job at Don's auto parts store, but he soon finds out that things just don't work out there.
6	"Karaoke"	Fred Goss	Story by : Fred Goss & Nick Holly; Teleplay by : Jordana Arkin & Julie Bean	March 21, 2006	106	4.05
Cameron's lack of enthusiasm at wife Liz's acceptance into graduate school and his mockery of younger sister Jenna's aspirations to be a singer put him on the outs with the family.
7	"Hospital Visit"	Dan O'Connor	Story by : Fred Goss & Nick Holly; Teleplay by : Justin Adler & Tom Huang	March 28, 2006	107	4.89
In the middle of an argument with Cameron, Colleen is rushed to the hospital with chest pains. Fearing she's had a heart attack, the family rushes to be by her side, leaving Cameron with feeling especially guilty that the stress of their fight brought it on.
8	"Surprise Party"	Anson Williams	Wil Calhoun & Julie Bean	March 28, 2006	108	4.63
On the eve of Cameron's 40th birthday, he gets laid off from work and keeps it a secret from his family, who are planning to throw him a surprise party.
9	"House Party"	Robert Berlinger	Jordana Arkin	April 4, 2006	109	3.28
When Don and Sharon go away for the night, they leave Jeff in charge and Jeff throws a house party. Concerned, Carrie calls her Uncle Cameron to put an end to it... but seeing it as an escape, he joins the fun and brings reluctant son Henry with him.
10	"The Homecoming"	Nick Holly	Fred Goss & Nick Holly	April 4, 2006	110	3.13
After 35 years, Cameron and Sharon's father, Merv, returns out of the blue. They decide to have dinner with him to discuss where he's been all these years, but a sudden turn of events leaves their questions still unanswered. Meanwhile, when Jenna finds out that Whitey is dating a stripper, she forbids him from seeing their Danny.
11	"Paige Returns"	Fred Goss	Fred Goss & Nick Holly	Unaired	111	N/A
Cameron's ex-wife Paige returns and wants custody of Henry, and plans to move to Florida to raise bees.

== Cancellation ==
Running against Fox Network's House timeslot it did not receive the ratings that would merit a second season pickup, however it had been rumored that ABC executives liked the show. It also had a devoted fanbase, and on April 17, 2006, a fan started an online petition to bring the show back, which Fred Goss mentioned on his blog. It failed, and it was canceled late April, 2006. The shows cancellation was again confirmed by the creator Fred Goss on May 15, 2006.

== Cast ==
- Gillian Vigman – Liz Walker
- Fred Goss – Cameron Walker
- Alison Quinn – Sharon Fenton
- Jerry Lambert – Don Fenton
- Amanda Walsh – Jenna Halbert
- Desmond Harrington – Wylie Blake
- Greg Pitts – Tommy White "Whitey"
- Dee Wallace-Stone – Colleen Halbert
- Max Gail – Wendal Halbert
- Eden Sher – Carrie Fenton
- Randy Wayne – Jeff Fenton
- Trevor Einhorn – Henry Walker
- Noah Matthews – Ezra Walker
- Lexi Jourden – Marni Walker
- Lois Hall – Aunt Rae
