= This Could B Us =

Single by Prince

from the album Hit n Run Phase One
- Released: August 28, 2015
- Recorded: Spring 2014
- Genre: Electro-funk
- Length: 4:11
- Label: NPG; Universal Music Group
- Songwriter: Prince
- Producers: Prince; Joshua Welton

Prince singles chronology
"Hardrocklover" (2015)	"This Could B Us" (2015)	"Free Urself" (2015)

"This Could B Us" is a song by American musician Prince, released on August 28, 2015, as the third single from his 38th album Hit n Run Phase One. The album was released two weeks later.

The single version of the song was the same as that first streamed on Tidal three days earlier; a remix (with additional recording) of the original track, which was released the previous year on Art Official Age.

== Background ==
The track was first mentioned in a June 23, 2014, article by Jon Bream in the Minneapolis Star Tribune (along with "The Gold Standard", a remix of "Funknroll" and an unnamed duet with Rita Ora). Bream mentions that Prince explained the track was named in reference to the #ThisCouldBeUsButYouPlayin meme. Prince explained that he was inspired by a widely retweeted image taken from his 1984 film Purple Rain, showing him and co-star Apollonia Kotero on a motorcycle, with the words "This could be us... but you playin" emblazoned above and below their faces. On June 26, 2014, a 35-second snippet of "This Could Be Us" was made available on 3rdEyeGirl Twitter account via a dropbox link.

The original version, "This Could Be Us", is the seventh track on Prince's 37th album Art Official Age. This version charted for 12 weeks on Billboard's Adult R&B Airplay chart, peaking at No. 19 on March 7, 2015. A remix of the track (titled "This Could B Us") is the fifth track on Prince's 38th album Hit n Run Phase One, and "This Could B Us" was released as the album's third single ten days before the album's release.

== Critical reception ==
In artist/writer Tora Borealis's review, she writes "Out of the two versions of This Could Be Us, the remix is punchier and puts some meat on the space-ballad's delicate bones. The original starts off with a Close Encounters melody, twinkles like a malfunctioning holodeck and slows to a close HAL-style. But HITnRUN's revisit takes the sci-fi effects and ramps it up into warp-drive. The second half is now basically an instrumental and all the better for it, although the song's lyrics aren't as corny as they first sound."
