= Hit n Run Phase Two =

Studio album by Prince
- Released: December 12, 2015
- Recorded: 2011–2015
- Studios: Paisley Park, Chanhassen, Minnesota, US
- Genres: Funk; soul; pop
- Length: 57:55
- Labels: NPG; Universal
- Producers: Prince and the New Power Generation

Prince chronology
Hit n Run Phase One (2015)	Hit n Run Phase Two (2015)	4Ever (2016)

Singles from Hit n Run Phase Two
- 1. "Rock and Roll Love Affair" Released: February 4, 2012; 2. "Screwdriver" Released: February 3, 2013; 3. "Xtraloveable" Released: June 20, 2013; 4. "Groovy Potential" Released: August 14, 2013; 5. "Baltimore" Released: May 26, 2015; 6. "Stare" Released: December 3, 2015

Hit n Run Phase Two is the thirty-ninth studio album by American musician Prince and the last to be released within his lifetime. It was initially released exclusively on the Tidal streaming service on December 12, 2015, for streaming and purchase as a continuation of his previous album, Hit n Run Phase One.

Prince confirmed on Twitter that a physical CD would be released during a weekend of Paisley Park shows in January 2016. The CD was given away to attendees of the shows on the Australian and New Zealand leg of the Piano & a Microphone Tour. The album was finally given a worldwide CD release on May 6, 2016, through Universal Music Group, just over two weeks after his death.

The album includes the song "Baltimore", for the memory of the death of Freddie Gray. The album has a more organic sound than the recent Art Official Age, features Booker T. Jones on engineering duties, and includes a large brass section (the "NPG Hornz") of five saxophonists, four trumpets and two trombones.

== Critical reception ==
Professional ratings
Aggregate scores
Source	Rating
Metacritic	63/100
Review scores
Source	Rating
AllMusic	3.5/5 stars
Consequence of Sound	C−
The Independent	4/5 stars
musicOMH	3/5 stars
NME	4/5
The Observer	3/5 stars
Paste	8.8/10
Pitchfork	4.7/10
Q	3/5 stars
Rolling Stone	3.5/5 stars

Hit n Run Phase Two received generally positive reviews from critics. At Metacritic, which assigns a normalized rating out of 100 to reviews from mainstream publications, the album received an average score of 63, based on 13 reviews. Reviewing for Rolling Stone, Kory Grow hailed it as Prince's "most consistently engaging album in years, blending in echoes of the ghosts of Prince past (à la "Sexy MF" and "Come") while still sounding refreshingly modern." Holly Gleason praised the record's brand of funk in her review for Paste. "Undulating, fizzy, and almost light-headed," Gleason wrote, "this is music to induce a euphoria that lifts skirts and spirits." Matthew Horton, writing for NME, also commented on Prince's return to a familiar sound, stating that Hit n Run Phase Two is "reconnecting him with the funkiest (and occasionally crunkiest) essentials, if not always his superior sense of melody." Andy Gill of The Independent believed it was perhaps Prince's best record in "a decade or two, and certainly the most confident and agreeable confirmation of his qualities for many a year." Stephen Thomas Erlewine wrote in AllMusic that Prince abandoned his previous record's contemporary influences, such as electronics or flashy guitar playing, in favor of "a streamlined, even subdued, soul album" and casually "good groove record".

In a less enthusiastic review, John Murphy from musicOMH deemed Phase Two "wildly inconsistent" with some flashes of Prince's brilliance. David Drake from Pitchfork was more critical, writing that the album sounded "underwhelming ... From beginning to end, Prince seems more interested in establishing his proficiency with pop forms, demonstrating his facility with the materials to craft, as it were, a sturdy wooden table. Rather than an artist's interpretation, we get a craftman's tracing." Writing for Consequence of Sound, Geoff Nelson said songs such as "Xtraloveable", "Screwdriver", and "When She Comes" were failed expressions of sexuality and came across as "Prince doing Prince, a cut-rate version of his once iconic fecundity."

== Commercial performance ==
The album debuted at No. 23 on the US Top R&B Albums chart following its release, selling 2,000 copies in its first week. It re-entered the chart at No. 13 when Prince died four months later, and peaked at No. 3 on chart dated May 21, 2016. It also peaked at 5 on the Top R&B/Hip-Hop Albums chart, and No. 40 on the Billboard 200. The album has sold 57,000 copies as of November 2016.

== Track listing ==
All tracks are written by Prince.

Hit n Run Phase Two track listing
No.	Title	Length
1.	"Baltimore"	4:33
2.	"Rocknroll Loveaffair"	4:01
3.	"2 Y. 2 D."	3:49
4.	"Look at Me, Look at U"	3:26
5.	"Stare"	3:45
6.	"Xtraloveable"	5:00
7.	"Groovy Potential"	6:16
8.	"When She Comes"	3:45
9.	"Screwdriver"	4:14
10.	"Black Muse"	7:21
11.	"Revelation"	5:21
12.	"Big City"	6:24
Total length:		57:55

Notes

- "Baltimore" was originally released on Prince's SoundCloud account in early May 2015; it was then re-released as an official single with additional horn and orchestra overdubs later in the month, which is presented on this album.
- "RocknRoll Love Affair", originally called "Rock and Roll Love Affair" was originally released as a single in November 2012. The version presented on this album has added horn overdubs.
- "Stare" was originally released as a Spotify exclusive track in September 2015. The song contains interpolations of Kiss from Parade (1986) and Sexy Dancer from Prince (1979).
- "Xtraloveable", originally called "Extraloveable" was originally written for Vanity 6 and demoed in early April 1982 before being scrapped. It was then re-recorded featuring a rap segment by Andy Allo and released in November 2011 exclusively for iTunes to promote Prince's Welcome 2 Canada tour. The version presented on this album is the "Extralovable Reloaded" version with the rap omitted and horn overdubs added that was released on Prince's 3rdeyegirl.com website in June 2013.
- "Groovy Potential" was originally released through Prince's 3rdeyetunes.com website in August 2013.
- "Screwdriver" was originally released as a single in February 2013.
- The track listing was originally set as a continuation of Hit n Run Phase One, with "Baltimore" as track 12; the album, as it exists on the Tidal website, is now split into a two-volume bundle.

== Charts ==
=== Weekly charts ===
Weekly chart performance for Hit n Run Phase Two
Chart (2016)	Peak position
Australian Albums (ARIA)	117
Austrian Albums (Ö3 Austria)	20
Belgian Albums (Ultratop Flanders)	7
Belgian Albums (Ultratop Wallonia)	25
Canadian Albums (Billboard)	47
Dutch Albums (Album Top 100)	5
French Albums (SNEP)	34
German Albums (Offizielle Top 100)	21
Irish Albums (IRMA)	45
Italian Albums (FIMI)	41
Polish Albums (ZPAV)	41
Scottish Albums (Official Charts)	22
Swedish Albums (Sverigetopplistan)	50
Swiss Albums (Schweizer Hitparade)	9
UK Albums (Official Charts)	21
UK Album Downloads (Official Charts)	28
UK Independent Albums (Official Charts)	4
US Billboard 200	40
US Top R&B/Hip-Hop Albums (Billboard)	5
US Independent Albums (Billboard)	28

=== Year-end charts ===
Year-end chart performance for Hit n Run Phase Two
Chart (2016)	Position
Belgian Albums (Ultratop Flanders)	130
US Top R&B/Hip-Hop Albums (Billboard)	64
