= Rocknroll Loveaffair =

"Rock and Roll Love Affair"

Single by Prince

from the album Hit n Run Phase Two
- Released: November 22, 2012
- Recorded: December 2011-January 2012
- Studio: Paisley Park, Chanhassen, Minnesota, US
- Length: 4:01
- Label: NPG / Purple Music
- Songwriter(s): Prince
- Producer(s): Prince

Prince singles chronology
| "Extraloveable" (2011) | "Rock and Roll Love Affair" (2012) | "Screwdriver" (2013) |

"Rock and Roll Love Affair" was a stand-alone single released on Swiss label Purple Music on November 22, 2012 (after initially being announced for November 2, then November 16, 2012). It was announced available for retailers on November 26, 2012.

The single premiered on September 17, 2012, on America radio iHeartRadio.com and Media Entertainment-owned stations. At the same time, Prince's appeared on the American talk show The View. It was announced as rotating on European radios from October 12, 2012, onwards. "Rock and Roll Love Affair" was released on CD and 12" vinyl (regular and picture).

The single entered the Billboard Adult Contemporary chart on October 6, 2012 at position 22. The single also charted for one week on the Billboard Hot R&B/Hip-Hop Singles Sales chart on February 20, 2013, peaking at number 7.

"Rock and Roll Love Affair" was included on Prince's 39th studio album Hit n Run Phase Two when it was released in December 2015, but this project is believed to have come later. In retrospect, however, "Rock and Roll Love Affair" is the album's second single.

== Background ==
While specific recording dates are not known, it is assumed to have been recorded in December 2011, or January 2012, at Paisley Park Studios in Chanhassen, Minnesota. Horn overdubs took place in late January 2012.

The lyrics make mention of "When Stars Collide", the title of a track by Andy Allo from her album Superconductor, and it can be interpreted that the song's lyrics refer to a relationship between Prince and background vocalist Andy Allo.

Nick DeRiso review of the song stated it includes repeated synth motifs combining parts of the main hook from The Jimi Hendrix Experience's "3rd Stone from the Sun" (a.k.a. "Third Stone from the Sun", written by Jimi Hendrix, from the 1967 album Are You Experienced), and Prince's own "Take Me with U".

On January 6, 2013, a 5:42 remix of the song was streamed on the 3rd Eye Girl YouTube channel. The same remix dubbed "Remix7" was made available to download on the 3rdEyeGirl.com website on February 5, 2013.

The same track retitled "Rocknroll Loveaffair" is the second track on Prince's 39th studio album Hitnrun Phase Two. It premiered on several Clear Channel Communications radio stations and iHeartRadio.com two months earlier, initially as "RNR Affair".

== Track listing ==
1. "Rock and Roll Love Affair" (Radio Edit) – 4:01
2. "Rock and Roll Love Affair" (Original Mix) – 5:25
3. "Rock and Roll Love Affair" (Jamie Lewis Club Mix) – 7:40
4. "Rock and Roll Love Affair" (Jamie Lewis Stripped Down mix) – 6:48
5. "Rock and Roll Love Affair" (Jamie Lewis Club Radio Edit) – 3:35
6. "Rock and Roll Love Affair" (Jamie Lewis Stripped Down Radio Edit) – 3:41

== Charts ==
Chart performance for "Rock and Roll Love Affair"
| Chart (2012) | Peak position |
|---|---|
| US Adult Contemporary (Billboard) | 22 |
| US R&B/Hip-Hop Singles Sales (Billboard) | 7 |
| UK Singles Chart | 121 |
