= Breakfast Can Wait =

Single by Prince

from the album Art Official Age
- Released: February 5, 2013
- Recorded: Late December 2012
- Studio: Paisley Park, Chanhassen, Minnesota, US
- Genre: R&B; smooth soul; funk
- Length: 4:37
- Label: NPG
- Songwriter: Prince
- Producer: Prince

Prince singles chronology
"Fixurlifeup" (2013)	"Breakfast Can Wait" (2013)	"Pretzelbodylogic" (2014)

"Breakfast Can Wait" is a song by American recording artist Prince. The single was released on February 5, 2013, on his website 3rdEyeGirl.com and was re-released on 3rdEyeTunes.com on August 17, 2013.

The accompanying artwork for the single features comedian Dave Chappelle of Chappelle's Show dressed as Purple Rain-era Prince and serving pancakes, a scene from the 2004 sketch "Charlie Murphy's True Hollywood Stories". In June 2014, Chappelle appeared on Jimmy Fallon's Tonight Show and discussed the use of his image on Prince's single: "That's a Prince judo move right there... You make fun of Prince in a sketch and he'll just use you in his album cover... What am I going to do—sue him for using a picture of me dressed up like him? ... That's checkmate right there."

A remix EP, titled The Breakfast Experience, followed on October 24, 2013, on iTunes and on Amazon the next day. It was made available on 3rdEyeTunes.com on November 5, 2013. The song is included on Prince's thirty-fourth studio album, Art Official Age, which was released on September 30, 2014.

== Music video ==
The music video for the song was filmed on September 19 and 20, 2013, in Los Angeles (without Prince present) and released on October 11, 2013. The video was directed by Danielle Curiel, a performer and part of the girl duo group Curly Fryz.

== Charts ==
Chart performance for "Breakfast Can Wait"
Chart (2014)	Peak position
Belgium (Ultratip Bubbling Under Flanders)	80
Belgium Urban (Ultratop Flanders)	38
