= Donna Grantis =

Canadian guitarist

- Born: Donna Grantis; Toronto, Canada
- Genres: Blues; jazz; funk; rock
- Occupations: Musician, guitarist
- Instrument: Guitar
- Website: Donnagrantis.com
- PRS CE22 (named Elektra)

Donna Grantis is a Canadian guitarist, best known for performing and recording with Prince & 3rdeyegirl. On September 30, 2014, Prince and 3rdeyegirl released their debut album, Plectrumelectrum, which reached number one on the Billboard Rock chart. The album's title track, "Plectrumelectrum", was originally written by Grantis and later arranged by Prince. Since 2013, Grantis has been a member of Prince's funk supergroup, The New Power Generation. On November 16, 2018, Grantis released two new songs, "Trashformer" and "Violetta," featuring Hall of Fame Pearl Jam guitarist Mike McCready, as a limited edition 7" via his vinyl label HockeyTalkter Records. The tracks appear on Grantis' debut album, Diamonds & Dynamite, released March 22, 2019, via eOne Music. The album and lead track reached number one on iTunes Canada for top jazz album and top jazz song.

== Biography ==
=== Early life ===
Grantis grew up outside of Toronto, in Mississauga, Ontario, Canada. She began playing acoustic guitar at the age of thirteen. Inspired by her older brother's classic rock record collection, she switched to electric guitar at fourteen. She was awarded a music scholarship to McGill University where she received a bachelor of Music degree in Jazz Performance. During her time there, she worked as a freelance musician, performing often throughout Montreal in various blues, jazz, funk and fusion bands.

=== 2002–2012 ===
Upon relocating to Toronto, Grantis worked as a session musician and bandleader, writing, performing and recording in the city's diverse music scene. She worked with artists such as blues vocalist Shakura S'Aida, rocker SATE (musician) (formerly known as Saidah Baba Talibah), an all-female reboot of soul-funk band Sue de Nym led by singer-songwriter Suzanne Nuttall (in 2009), hip hop artist Kardinal Offishall, indie artist Hill Kourkoutis (Hill & The Sky Heroes), jazz vocalist Kellylee Evans, R&B songwriter Haydain Neale (Jacksoul) and multi-platinum pop singer Amanda Marshall. As a band leader and composer, Grantis fronted an instrumental jazz-fusion trio called the Donna Grantis Electric Band. Her debut solo album, Suites, was independently released June 26, 2012. The Donna Grantis Electric Band marked the release of the album with a performance at Toronto jazz club, the Rex Hotel, before touring Europe in support of the record through the fall of 2012. As a musical director, Grantis worked on special events with the Canadian Broadcasting Corporation (CBC) and the Women's Blues Revue among others.

=== Prince ===
In November 2012, Grantis received an invitation to Prince's Minnesota recording complex, Paisley Park. Alongside Prince, drummer Hannah Welton, and bassist Ida Nielsen, Grantis jammed a short list of songs as an audition for what would evolve into the funk-rock recording and performing trio, 3rdeyegirl. The group toured throughout the UK, Europe and North America. On September 30, 2014, Prince & 3rdeyegirl released their only album, Plectrumelectrum. Upon release, the album reached number one on the Billboard Rock Chart in the US. The title track, "Plectrumelectrum", was originally written by Grantis and later arranged by Prince. From 2013 until the death of Prince in 2016, Grantis was a member of his funk supergroup, the New Power Generation.

== Equipment ==
Grantis' primary instrument is a custom private stock PRS guitar. It is based on a Mira semi-hollow, with a Korina body, gold mirror pick guard and headstock, maple neck and whammy bar. Her purple PRS CE 22, which she has used extensively in performances and recording sessions, is named "Elektra". Grantis has several specialized effects pedal boards, including one referred to as "the starship". The board consists of twenty pedals across three interconnected boards. It was built by Craig Pattison specifically for her role in 3rdeyegirl to cover a wide array of tones. Grantis uses Delrin 0.73mm picks.
