= Art Official Age =

Studio album by Prince
- Released: September 26, 2014 (Germany and Europe) • September 29, 2014 (UK) • September 30, 2014 (USA)
- Recorded: 2011–2014
- Studios: Paisley Park, Chanhassen, Minnesota
- Genres: R&B; electro-funk
- Length: 53:16
- Labels: NPG, Warner Bros.
- Producer: Prince • Joshua Welton

Prince chronology
Plectrumelectrum (2014)	Art Official Age (2014)	Hit n Run Phase One (2015)

Singles from Art Official Age
- 1. "Breakfast Can Wait" Released: February 4, 2013; 2. "The Breakdown" Released: April 18, 2014; 3. "Clouds" Released: August 24, 2014; 4. "U Know" Released: September 18, 2014 (MP3 single); 5. "FunknRoll" Released: September 18, 2014 (MP3 single)

Art Official Age is the thirty-seventh studio album by American recording artist Prince. It was released on September 26, 2014 by NPG Records under a renewed license to Warner Bros. Records, marking the second collaboration of both parties since 1999's The Vault: Old Friends 4 Sale.

Prince released the album Plectrumelectrum, recorded with his touring band 3rdeyegirl, simultaneously.

== Commercial performance ==
Art Official Age debuted at number five on the Billboard 200 and sold 51,000 copies in its first week. In its second week of sales, the album dropped to number 22 on the chart, selling 15,000 copies, bringing the total to 66,000 copies.

== Critical reception ==
Professional ratings
Review scores
Source	Rating
AllMusic	3/5 stars
The A.V. Club	A−
Chicago Tribune	3.5/4 stars
The Daily Telegraph	4/5 stars
Los Angeles Times	4/4 stars
The Observer	4/5 stars
Pitchfork	6.5/10
Q	2/5 stars
Rolling Stone	3.5/5 stars
Slant Magazine	3/5 stars

Art Official Age received generally positive reviews from music critics. At Metacritic, which assigns a normalized rating out of 100 to reviews from mainstream critics, the album received an average score of 70, based on 24 reviews. In his review for the Chicago Tribune, Greg Kot said that it is "a more substantial and stranger album" than Plectrumelectrum. Randall Roberts of the Los Angeles Times called it "an exquisite Prince R&B album", while The Daily Telegraph's Neil McCormick said it is "a slick, seductive electro funk sci-fi concept album". Classic Pop also described the album as electro-funk. Kitty Empire was favorable toward Prince's use of digital production in her review for The Observer and called it "a far better album than you'd dare hope from the latterday Prince". Billboard magazine's Kenneth Partridge said Prince is "funnier, sexier, and more self-aware than he's been in ages" and that the album is his most creative since the 1990s.

In a less enthusiastic review for AllMusic, Stephen Thomas Erlewine wrote that Art Official Age is a "full-fledged R&B album" in the vein of Prince's work with the New Power Generation, but some of his "modernization feels a bit ham-fisted". Q magazine was more critical and dismissed it as "an overlong, pan-generic concept album", while Jon Pareles of The New York Times said its songs lack memorable melodies despite the "musicianly ingenuity" of their production. Pareles added that it abandons the concept established by the album's first few songs and interludes, which have Prince "waking up from suspended animation 45 years from now". Robert Christgau cited "Breakfast Can Wait" and "FunknRoll" as highlights in his review for Cuepoint, facetiously remarking, "our greatest composer-performer of romantic nu-funk erotica wakes up 40 years later wishing he was Janelle Monáe".

== Track listing ==
All tracks are written by Prince.

Art Official Age track listing
No.	Title	Length
1.	"Art Official Cage" (Danish vocals by Ida Kristine Nielsen)	3:41
2.	"Clouds" (featuring Lianne La Havas)	4:34
3.	"Breakdown"	4:04
4.	"The Gold Standard"	5:53
5.	"U Know" (contains a sample from the song "Blinded" by Mila J)	3:56
6.	"Breakfast Can Wait"	3:54
7.	"This Could Be Us"	5:12
8.	"What It Feels Like" (featuring Andy Allo)	3:53
9.	"Affirmation I & II" (featuring Lianne La Havas)	0:40
10.	"Way Back Home" (featuring Delilah)	3:05
11.	"Funknroll"	4:08
12.	"Time" (featuring Andy Allo)	6:49
13.	"Affirmation III" (featuring Lianne La Havas)	3:28

== Charts ==
=== Weekly charts ===
Weekly chart performance for Art Official Age
Chart (2014)	Peak position
Australian Albums (ARIA)	15
Belgian Albums (Ultratop Flanders)	8
Belgian Albums (Ultratop Wallonia)	18
Canadian Albums (Billboard)	21
Danish Albums (Hitlisten)	3
Dutch Albums (Album Top 100)	4
Finnish Albums (Suomen virallinen lista)	20
French Albums (SNEP)	6
Hungarian Albums (MAHASZ)	3
Italian Albums (FIMI)	9
Japanese Albums (Oricon)	6
Japanese Hot Albums (Billboard Japan)	16
New Zealand Albums (RMNZ)	17
Norwegian Albums (VG-lista)	2
Scottish Albums (Official Charts)	9
Spanish Albums (Promusicae)	16
Swedish Albums (Sverigetopplistan)	9
UK Albums (Official Charts)	8
UK R&B Albums (Official Charts)	1
US Billboard 200	5
US Top R&B/Hip-Hop Albums (Billboard)	1

=== Year-end charts ===
2014 year-end chart performance for Art Official Age
Chart (2014)	Position
Belgian Albums (Ultratop Flanders)	147
US Top R&B/Hip-Hop Albums (Billboard)	41

2015 year-end chart performance for Art Official Age
Chart (2015)	Position
US Top R&B/Hip-Hop Albums (Billboard)	87
