= Ida Kristine Nielsen =

Danish musician and composer (born 1975)

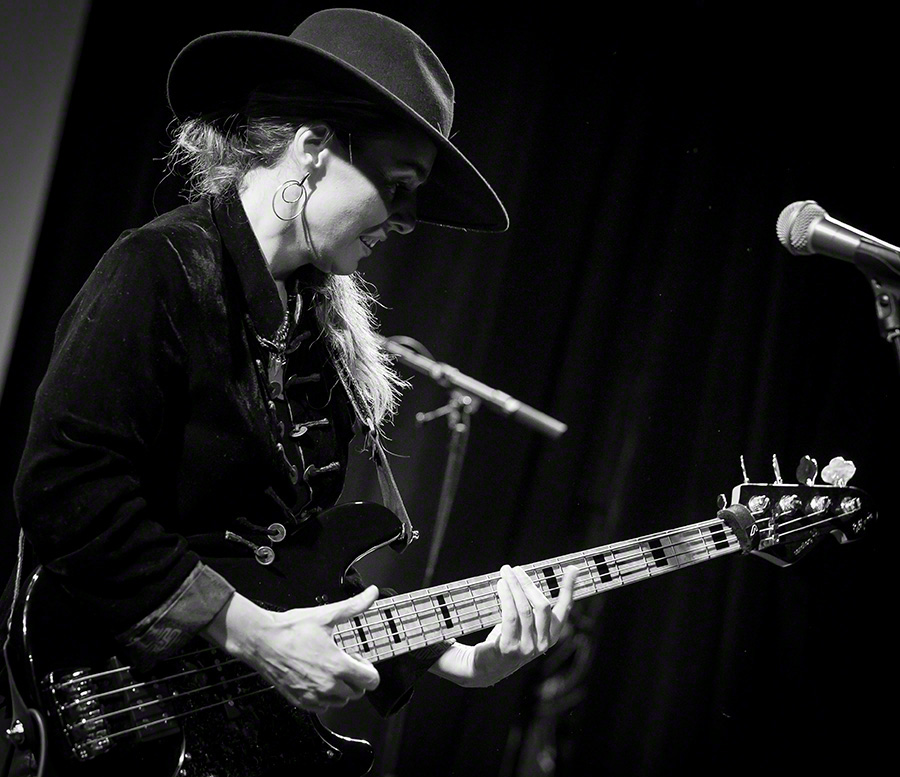
- Nielsen in 2016

Background information
- Also known as: Bass Ida, Bassida, Ida Funkhouser
- Born: Ida Kristine Nielsen; 1975 (age 50–51); Denmark
- Genres: Funk; soul; rock; world
- Occupations: Musician, multi-instrumentalist
- Instruments: Vocals, bass guitar, keyboard, drums, guitar
- Labels: NPG Records; Marmelade Productions
- Website: http://idanielsenbass.com

Ida Kristine Nielsen (born 1975), also known as Bass Ida, Bassida, and Ida Funkhouser, is a Danish bass player, composer and vocalist. She is known for being a member of several bands, such as Belgian Zap Mama, Danish pop rock band Michael Learns to Rock, American funk band the New Power Generation, and funk rock trio 3rdeyegirl (2012–2016). The latter two were backing bands for Prince.

== History ==
Nielsen started playing bass at age 16. During 1993–1998 she studied at the Royal Danish Academy of Music and finished her diploma with electric bass as her major instrument.

In 2008 she released her first solo album, Marmelade.

In 2010 Nielsen started working with Prince, and became a member of The New Power Generation as singer and bassist. She later became a part of Prince's musical trio, 3rdeyegirl, alongside guitarist Donna Grantis and drummer Hannah Welton. They toured the UK, Europe and North America, and in 2014 released their only album, Plectrumelectrum.

In 2014 Nielsen released her second album, Sometimes a Girl Needs Some Sugar Too. Her first single, "SHOWMEWHATUGOT" (from her "TurnItUp" album) was hand-picked by Prince to be "Purple pick of the week" on TIDAL when it was released. Nielsen and Prince continued to work together until Prince's death in April 2016. Later that year, she released her third album, TurnItUp in his memory. In an interview with Danish National DR-TV in 2017 she underlined Prince's influence - to her music as well as her life:

"The most important thing Prince taught me was to play with my heart. Always!"

== Discography ==
=== Album ===
- 2008 – Marmelade (as: "BassIda")
- 2011 – Sometimes a Girl Needs Some Sugar Too
- 2016 – Turnitup
- 2019 – Time 2 Stop Worrying
- 2020 – 02022020
- 2023 - More Sauce,Please!
