= 3rdeyegirl =

American funk rock band

- Also known as: Thirdeye
- Genre: Funk rock
- Years active: 2012–2016
- Labels: NPG Records, under license to Warner Bros. Records
- Past members: Hannah Welton; Donna Grantis; Ida Kristine Nielsen
- Website: www.3rdeyegirl.com

3rdeyegirl, stylized as 3RDEYEGIRL, was an American funk rock band and Prince's backing band from his 2014 return to Warner Music until his death in 2016. It was a trio consisting of the American drummer Hannah Welton, Canadian guitarist Donna Grantis and Danish bassist Ida Kristine Nielsen. Together with Prince, they released the LP Plectrumelectrum on September 30, 2014. Together with Prince, they embarked on the Hit and Run Tour from 2014 to 2015.

== Former band members ==
- Hannah Welton – drums, vocals
- Donna Grantis – guitar, vocals
- Ida Kristine Nielsen – bass, vocals

== Discography ==
=== Studio albums ===
List of studio albums, with selected chart positions
Year	Album	Peak positions				
Year	Album	US	AUS	FRA	SCO	UK
2014	Plectrumelectrum (with Prince)	8	33	13	15	11
