= Fred Goss =

American actor

Fred Goss (born March 25, 1961, in Orchard Lake, Michigan) is an American TV actor, director, writer, producer and comedian. He was also the lead singer for the 1970s punk-rock group Bogue Herb.

== As writer ==
Goss began writing and staging his own plays in his twenties. He wrote sketch comedy during his thirties, primarily at the Los Angeles–based ACME Comedy Theater. More recently, Fred wrote many of the episodes of his ABC comedy Sons & Daughters. He has written pilot scripts for ABC, NBC, and FOX. In 2014, he developed a half-hour comedy for ABC called The FunHouse. In 2013, he developed a half-hour comedy for USA Network called HR. He currently has a deal with Paramount Digital for a comedy series called FOCUS.

== As acting student/teacher ==
Instructors who have taught Goss include Al Osburg, Harry Mastrogeorge, Cynthia Szigeti, Stephen Book, Cecily Adams, and Jeffrey Tambor. After studying the Viola Spolin technique, he has taught (Improvisation for the Theater) to adults and children.

== As actor ==
Fred Goss began acting at age fourteen. Before he was thirty, Goss had performed in more than 75 stage productions. He has been a member of The New A.R.T.E.F Players, Pacific Rep and Theater East. Goss also performed in two different house improvisation groups at The Comedy Store in Hollywood. and as part of the main company at The ACME Comedy Theater in Los Angeles.

Goss's professional acting debut was a small guest star part in the NBC comedy ALF. Goss starred in the Bravo comedy series Significant Others. He also starred in the short-lived ABC comedy Sons & Daughters portraying the character Cameron Walker, and starred as Gracen Brooker, in the ABC comedy Carpoolers.

== As director ==
Goss began directing theater productions in his twenties. He has directed pilots and presentations for ABC, NBC, VH1, Fox TV Studios and more. Goss directed many episodes of his ABC comedy series, Sons & Daughters. Goss is also a successful commercial director, working exclusively with Company Films in Los Angeles.

In 2016, Goss continues to direct episodic TV. His recent credits include multiple episodes of Brooklyn Nine-Nine, New Girl, Marry Me, Modern Family, Life In Pieces, Those Who Can't, Don't Trust The B In Apt. 13, Imaginary Mary, Community, Happy Endings, Ben & Kate, The Crazy Ones, Enlisted, Manhattan Love Story and many more.

== As producer ==
Fred has a current project with Paramount Digital called FOCUS. A half hour comedy he also wrote and will direct. In 2014, Goss developed a half-hour comedy for ABC called The Funhouse. He developed a project called HR for USA Network in 2013. Goss has created and executive produced pilot episodes of shows for NBC (The Weekend), ABC (Sons & Daughters, The Owners), and Fox TV Studios (Endless Summer). He also created and executive produced the critically acclaimed but short-lived ABC comedy series, Sons & Daughters. Goss entered an exclusive two year development deal with ABC TV in the fall of 2006.

== Personal life ==
Fred has three adult children and is married to Dr. Elizabeth Miller.
