= Hit n Run Phase One =

Studio album by Prince
- Released: September 7, 2015
- Recorded: 2013–2015
- Studios: Paisley Park, Chanhassen, Minnesota
- Genres: R&B; soul; electronic
- Length: 38:00
- Labels: NPG; Universal
- Producers: Prince; Joshua Welton

Prince chronology
| Art Official Age (2014) | Hit n Run Phase One (2015) | Hit n Run Phase Two (2015) |

Singles from Hit n Run Phase One
- 1. "Fallinlove2nite" Released: March 17, 2014; 2. "Hardrocklover" Released: July 7, 2015; 3. "This Could B Us" Released: August 28, 2015 (non-US single)

Hit n Run Phase One is the thirty-eighth studio album by American recording artist Prince. It was first released exclusively on the Tidal streaming service on September 7, 2015 before being released on CD on September 15, 2015 by NPG Records.

The title was originally reported to be The Hit & Run Album but was confirmed by Prince's publicists as Hit n Run Phase One.

== Critical reception ==
Professional ratings
Aggregate scores
| Source | Rating |
|---|---|
| Metacritic | 53/100 |
Review scores
| Source | Rating |
| AllMusic | 3/5 stars |
| The A.V. Club | C− |
| Entertainment Weekly | A |
| musicOMH | 3.5/5 stars |
| NME | 7/10 |
| The Observer | 3/5 stars |
| Pitchfork | 4.5/10 |
| PopMatters | 2/10 |
| Q | 2/5 stars |
| Rolling Stone | 3/5 stars |

Hit n Run Phase One received mixed reviews from music critics. At Metacritic, which assigns a normalized rating out of 100 to reviews from mainstream critics, the album received an average score of 53, based on 16 reviews.

== Track listing ==
All tracks are written by Prince and Joshua Welton, except where noted.

| No. | Title | Writer(s) | Length |
|---|---|---|---|
| 1. | "Million $ Show" (featuring Judith Hill) | | 3:10 |
| 2. | "Shut This Down" | | 3:03 |
| 3. | "Ain't About 2 Stop" (featuring Rita Ora) | | 3:40 |
| 4. | "Like a Mack" (featuring Curly Fryz) | | 4:05 |
| 5. | "This Could B Us" | Prince | 4:11 |
| 6. | "Fallinlove2nite" | Prince | 3:13 |
| 7. | "X's Face" | | 2:38 |
| 8. | "Hardrocklover" | | 3:43 |
| 9. | "Mr. Nelson" (featuring Lianne La Havas) | | 2:27 |
| 10. | "1000 X's & O's" | Prince | 4:28 |
| 11. | "June" | | 3:22 |
| Total length: | | | 37:58 |

Notes

- Million $ Show contains segments of past Prince songs; For You from For You (1978), 1999 from 1999 (1982), and Let's Go Crazy from Purple Rain (1984).
- "1000 X's & O's" is also listed as "1000's of X's & O's" on the CD edition.

== Charts ==
=== Weekly charts ===
Weekly chart performance for Hit n Run Phase One
| Chart (2015–2016) | Peak position |
|---|---|
| Australian Albums (ARIA) | 25 |
| Austrian Albums (Ö3 Austria) | 53 |
| Belgian Albums (Ultratop Flanders) | 19 |
| Belgian Albums (Ultratop Wallonia) | 34 |
| Dutch Albums (Album Top 100) | 11 |
| French Albums (SNEP) | 38 |
| German Albums (Offizielle Top 100) | 53 |
| Irish Albums (IRMA) | 52 |
| Italian Albums (FIMI) | 39 |
| Scottish Albums (Official Charts) | 36 |
| Swiss Albums (Schweizer Hitparade) | 27 |
| UK Albums (Official Charts) | 50 |
| UK Album Downloads (Official Charts) | 49 |
| UK Independent Albums (Official Charts) | 4 |
| US Billboard 200 | 48 |
| US Top R&B/Hip-Hop Albums (Billboard) | 4 |

=== Year-end charts ===
2015 year-end chart performance for Hit n Run Phase One
| Chart (2015) | Position |
|---|---|
| US Top R&B/Hip-Hop Albums (Billboard) | 93 |

2016 year-end chart performance for Hit n Run Phase One
| Chart (2016) | Position |
|---|---|
| US Top R&B/Hip-Hop Albums (Billboard) | 74 |

== Release history ==
Release history and formats for Hit n Run Phase One
| Region | Date | Format | Label | Ref. |
|---|---|---|---|---|
| Various | September 14, 2015 | Digital download | NPG | |
| Various | September 15, 2015 | CD | NPG | |
