= Plectrumelectrum =

Studio album by Prince and 3rdeyegirl
- Released: September 26, 2014 (Germany and Europe) • September 29, 2014 (UK) • September 30, 2014 (USA)
- Recorded: 2013–2014
- Studios: Paisley Park, Chanhassen, Minnesota, US • Studio One, London, UK
- Genre: Funk rock
- Length: 44:00
- Labels: NPG; Warner Bros.
- Producers: Prince; 3rdeyegirl

Prince chronology
20Ten (2010)	Plectrumelectrum (2014)	Art Official Age (2014)

Singles from Plectrumelectrum
- 1. "Fixurlifeup" Released: May 16, 2013; 2. "Pretzelbodylogic" Released: February 3, 2014; 3. "Whitecaps" Released: September 26, 2014 (MP3 single)

Plectrumelectrum, stylized in all uppercase, is the thirty-sixth studio album by American recording artist Prince, and the only to feature his backing band 3rdeyegirl. It was released on September 26, 2014 by NPG Records under a renewed license to Warner Bros. Records. Plectrumelectrum received generally positive reviews from critics.

Prince released the album Art Official Age simultaneously.

== Music and lyrics ==
According to Randall Roberts of the Los Angeles Times, Plectrumelectrum is a rock album with lyrics and sound effects characteristic of Prince's "noble weirdness" and "sense of humor". Abigail Covington of The A.V. Club said that "it takes a no-nonsense approach to funk and for the most part plays near the shallow shores of rock 'n' roll's enormous waters." Rolling Stone reviewer Jon Dolan described the record as "a set of exploratory funk-rock jams".

== Critical reception ==
Professional ratings
Review scores
Source	Rating
AllMusic	3/5 stars
The A.V. Club	A−
Chicago Tribune	3/4 stars
The Daily Telegraph	5/5 stars
Entertainment Weekly	B+
The Guardian	3/5 stars
Los Angeles Times	2/4 stars
Q	4/5 stars
Pitchfork	3.8/10
Rolling Stone	2/5 stars

Plectrumelectrum received generally positive reviews from music critics. At Metacritic, which assigns a normalized rating out of 100 to reviews from mainstream critics, the album received an average score of 61, based on 18 reviews. Q magazine said that "the sound of [Prince] working with a lean combo is so refreshing, and a welcome first in his mammoth catalogue." Kyle Anderson of Entertainment Weekly felt its hooks and band dynamic make it a better album than Art Official Age. Neil McCormick of The Daily Telegraph wrote that "the rock format appears to have concentrated him on songwriting basics."

In a less enthusiastic review for The New York Times, Jon Pareles wrote that Plectrumelectrum is limited by its "rigorous, deliberately retro back-to-basics mandate" because Prince is better at synthesizing styles together rather than reproducing them. Stephen Thomas Erlewine wrote in his review for AllMusic that the album does not try anything new, but called it "a quiet thrill to hear Prince spar with worthy partners, as he does throughout this record."

== Commercial performance ==
The album debuted at number eight on the Billboard 200 and sold 26,000 copies in its first week. In its second week of sales, the album dropped down to number 47 on the chart, selling 7,000 copies, bringing total sales to 33,000 copies.

== Track listing ==
All tracks are written by Prince except as indicated.

Plectrumelectrum track listing
No.	Title	Length
1.	"WOW"	4:28
2.	"PRETEZELBODYLOGIC"	3:26
3.	"AINTTURNINAROUND"	3:02
4.	"PLECTRUMELECTRUM (instrumental)" (Prince/Grantis)	4:51
5.	"WHITECAPS"	3:43
6.	"FIXURLIFEUP"	3:12
7.	"BOYTROUBLE" (featuring Lizzo and Sophia Eris)	3:53
8.	"STOPTHISTRAIN"	3:41
9.	"ANOTHERLOVE" (Alice Smith, Rebecca Jordan, and Reginald "Syience" Perry)	4:16
10.	"TICTACTOE"	3:38
11.	"MARZ"	1:48
12.	"FUNKNROLL"	4:12

== Charts ==
Chart performance for Plectrumelectrum
Chart (2014)	Peak position
Australian Albums (ARIA)	33
Belgian Albums (Ultratop Flanders)	11
Belgian Albums (Ultratop Wallonia)	29
Danish Albums (Hitlisten)	8
Dutch Albums (Album Top 100)	9
French Albums (SNEP)	13
Hungarian Albums (MAHASZ)	6
Italian Albums (FIMI)	21
New Zealand Albums (RMNZ)	31
Norwegian Albums (VG-lista)	8
Scottish Albums (Official Charts)	15
Swiss Albums (Schweizer Hitparade)	8
UK Albums (Official Charts)	11
US Billboard 200	8
US Top Rock Albums (Billboard)	1
