= List of New Trier High School alumni =

This is a list of alumni from New Trier High School, a four-year high school in Winnetka, Illinois, a northern suburb of Chicago, including alumni from the former New Trier East and New Trier West high schools:

== Business ==
- Bobbi Brown, make-up artist, entrepreneur, author, and founder of a line of cosmetics
- Douglas Conant, former chairman of Avon Products; former president and CEO of the Campbell's
- Chris Cox (2000), chief product officer (CPO) of Facebook
- John Donahoe (1978), president and CEO of Nike (2020–2024), president and CEO of eBay (2008–2015), chairman of PayPal (2015–present), CEO of ServiceNow (2017–2019)
- Christie Hefner (1970), former CEO of Playboy Enterprises
- Charles F. Knight (1953), chairman emeritus of Emerson Electric Co.
- James McNerney (1967), president of GE Lighting (1995–97), president of GE Aircraft Engines (1997–2000), president and CEO of 3M (2000–05), CEO of Boeing (2005–15)

== Film, television, and theater ==
- Ann-Margret (1959), actress and entertainer
- Adam Baldwin (1980), actor
- Steve Barancik (1979), screenwriter
- Ralph Bellamy (1922), actor
- Beck Bennett (2003), Saturday Night Live cast member
- Carlos Bernard (1980), actor
- Mark Boone Junior (1973), actor
- Stephen Brooks, actor
- John Byrum (1965), film producer, director and screenwriter
- Liz Callaway (1978), musical theatre actress
- William Christopher, actor
- Lisa Darr (1981), actress
- Bruce Dern (1954), actor
- Christine Ebersole (1971), actress and singer
- James Eckhouse, actor
- Neal Edelstein (1987), film director and producer
- Dede Gardner (1986), film producer
- Charlton Heston (1941), actor and political activist
- Rock Hudson (1943), actor
- Scott Jaeck (1973), actor
- Jake Johnson (1996), actor, comedian, screenwriter
- Mike Kelley (1985), television writer and producer
- Virginia Madsen (1979), actress
- Lauren Marcus (attended; transferred to another school), actress
- Liesel Matthews (2002), actress and heiress and member of the Pritzker family
- Kim Milford (1968), actor
- Penelope Milford (1966), actress
- John R. Montgomery (1975), television producer
- Hugh O'Brian (did not graduate), actor
- David O'Brien (1953), actor
- Jeffrey Price, member of screenwriting team with Peter S. Seaman
- Maeve Quinlan (1982), actress, producer
- Kevin Quinn (2015), actor and singer-songwriter
- Betsy Randle (1968), actress
- Mark Romanek (1977), music video and film director, writer, and producer
- Charlotte Ross (1986), actress
- Tom Rubnitz, video artist
- Mary Kate Schellhardt (1997), actress
- Rusty Schwimmer (1980), actress
- Michael Shannon, actor
- Les Shapiro, NBC, CBS, ESPN sportsw journalist, Denver
- Hal Sparks (1988), actor and comedian
- David Strassman (West), performer and ventriloquist
- Lili Taylor (1985), actress
- Paul Thomas (born Phil Toubus) (1967), actor, director
- Nico Tortorella (2006), actor
- Jim True-Frost (aka Jim True) (1984), actor
- Rainn Wilson (1984), actor
- Terence H. Winkless, film and TV producer, director and writer
- Edward Zwick (1970), film and television director and producer

== Journalism and letters ==
- Julia Allison (1999), journalist, pioneering influencer, tv commentator, media personality, Harvard researcher
- Elizabeth Brackett (1959), television news correspondent
- Shams Charania (2012), NBA reporter for ESPN, previously for Yahoo Sports' The Vertical, The Athletic, and Stadium
- Ann Compton (1965), television news reporter and correspondent
- Chet Coppock (1966), radio sportscaster
- Brian D'Amato (1976), novelist and sculptor
- Alan Goldsher (1984), novelist and ghostwriter
- Walter Jacobson (1955), local television news personality
- Geoffrey A. Landis (1973), engineer and Hugo and Nebula Award-winning science fiction author
- Edward Lifson (1974), journalist for National Public Radio and other outlets, and architecture writer
- John Lippman, television executive; acting director of Voice of America
- Archibald MacLeish (did not graduate), writer and three-time Pulitzer Prize winner
- Walter McDougall (1964), Pulitzer Prize-winning author and historian
- Nell Minow (1970), film critic and author in the field of corporate governance
- Stephen Moore (1978), economics writer, journalist and commentator
- Henry H. Neff (1991), author and illustrator
- Juliet Law Packer (1970), television writer
- Nancy Pick (1979), journalist and coauthor of Do Plants Know Math?, winner of the Euler Book Prize
- Chris Plante, television reporter, host of eponymous radio show
- Dan Ponce (1995), WGN-TV news anchor; founder of Straight No Chaser a cappella music group
- Ian Punnett (1978), radio personality and writer
- Sarah Ruhl (1992), playwright
- Thomas A. Stewart (1966), business journalist and editor
- John Stossel (1965), author, commentator and investigative journalist
- Penelope Trunk (1985), author, blogger, and entrepreneur
- Scott Turow (1966), lawyer and novelist
- Donovan Webster (1977), journalist, author, editor, and filmmaker

== Law ==
- Richard Clifton (1968), senior United States circuit judge of the United States Court of Appeals for the Ninth Circuit
- Martha Minow (1972), former dean of Harvard Law School
- Dean A. Pinkert (1974), trade lawyer; former member of the United States International Trade Commission

== Music ==
- David Charles Abell (1976), conductor
- Mike Bloomfield (did not graduate), rock and blues guitarist
- Jaimie Branch (2001), jazz trumpeter
- Andy Brick (1983), composer and conductor
- Ann Hampton Callaway (1976), singer and songwriter
- Marshall Chess, music executive and producer
- Kristine Flaherty (2003), rapper
- Katie Gavin (2011), lead singer of the band MUNA
- Jeff Harnar (1977), cabaret singer
- Erwin Helfer (1954), boogie woogie and jazz innovator, performer, and educator
- Al Jourgensen (attended), musician
- Kate Liu (2012), pianist, 3rd prize winner of XVII International Chopin Piano Competition
- Louis the Child, musical duo composed of Robert Hauldren (2015) and Frederic Kennett (2016)
- Gary Novak (1987), session drummer
- Sean O'Keefe (1998), record producer, mixer and engineer
- Petey USA, musician and social media personality
- Liz Phair (1985), singer-songwriter
- Matthew Polenzani (1986), lyric tenor opera singer
- Dave Samuels (1966), jazz vibraphonist who played with Spyro Gyra and the Caribbean Jazz Project
- John Baker Saunders (1973), founding member and bassist for the grunge rock supergroup Mad Season
- William Susman (1978), composer of concert and film music
- Joe Trohman (2002), guitarist for the bands The Damned Things and Fall Out Boy
- Peter Van de Graaff (1979), musician, bass baritone and classical radio host on WFMT
- Matt Walker (1987), rock musician and former drummer for The Smashing Pumpkins
- Linda Waterfall, folk musician and singer-songwriter
- Aaron Weinstein (2003), jazz violinist
- Pete Wentz (attended), bassist for the bands Black Cards and Fall Out Boy
- The Ying Quartet, string quartet started by four siblings who are all alumni: David (1981), Tim (1983), Phillip (1986), and Janet (1988)
- Stella Lefty (2020), American singer-songwriter

== Politics and government ==
- Judy Biggert (1955), U.S. representative
- Bob Dold (1987), U.S. representative
- Rahm Emanuel (West, 1977), U.S. representative, White House chief of staff and mayor of Chicago, U.S. ambassador to Japan
- David H. Hoffman (1984), federal prosecutor and Chicago's inspector general
- Edgard D. Kagan (1985), U.S. ambassador to Malaysia
- Fred Karger (1968), political consultant and Republican gay rights advocate
- Mark Kirk (1977), U.S. representative and senator
- Thomas Miller (1966), U.S. ambassador to Bosnia and Herzegovina (1999–2001) and Greece (2001–04)
- Charles H. Percy (1937), U.S. Senator
- Michael S. Rogers (1977), U.S. Navy four-star admiral and former director of the National Security Agency
- Carol Ronen (1962), Illinois state representative and state senator
- Donald Rumsfeld (1950), U.S. representative, White House chief of staff and U.S. secretary of defense
- Jack Ryan, former candidate for U.S. Senate in Illinois
- James D. Swan, Wisconsin state senator
- Alaina Teplitz (1987), U.S. ambassador to Nepal (2015–2018), U.S. ambassador to Sri Lanka (2018–2021)
- Richard S. Williamson (1967), U.S. ambassador and diplomat

== Science and technology ==
- Bruce Alberts (1956), biochemist, president of the National Academy of Sciences and editor in chief of the journal Science
- Lise Eliot (1980), professor of neuroscience and author
- Ellen Fetter (1957), computer scientist
- Todd Golub (1981), cancer researcher, director of the cancer program at the Broad Institute
- Mary-Claire King (1963), geneticist
- Geoffrey A. Landis, aerospace engineer and author
- Michael Peskin (West, 1969), physicist
- Martin Rocek (1971), physicist
- Rafael Sorkin (valedictorian 1963), physicist
- Jack Steinberger (1938), co-recipient of the 1988 Nobel Prize in Physics (he donated his Nobel medal to the New Trier science department)
- Kenneth S. Suslick (1970), chemist
- Clifford Tabin (1972), geneticist, chairman of the Department of Genetics at Harvard Medical School, elected member of the National Academy of Sciences, elected a Foreign Member of the Royal Society

== Sports ==
- Trish Andrew (1989), basketball player for The University of Michigan
- Ross Baumgarten (1973), baseball pitcher
- Ben Braun (1971), men's collegiate basketball coach, University of California (1996–2008), Rice (2008–14)
- Pete Burnside (1948), baseball pitcher
- Michelle Casati, female tennis player
- John Castino (1973), baseball infielder
- Peter Chatain, rower, 2024 Olympics bronze medalist
- Rick Hahn (1989), MLB general manager of the Chicago White Sox (2012-23)
- Mike Huff (1981), baseball outfielder
- Dave Jauss, baseball coach and scout
- Robert Jeangerard (1952), basketball player, 1956 Olympics gold medalist
- Matt Kaskey (2015), offensive tackle for the Carolina Panthers
- Chuck Lindstrom (1954), baseball catcher and coach
- Matt Lottich (2000), basketball player for Stanford
- Clay Matthews (1974), NFL linebacker (1978–93)
- Walker McKinven, bench coach with the Chicago White Sox starting with the 2025 season.
- Chuck Mercein (1961), NFL running back
- Phoebe Mills, athlete, gymnastics bronze medalist in 1988 Summer Olympics
- John Moore (2009), NHL player
- Mike Pyle (1957), NFL center
- Jack Riley (1933), Olympic wrestler and NFL offensive tackle
- Fred Schmidt (c.1961), swimmer
- Thomas E. Thompson (1904), college basketball coach for the University of Illinois (1910–1912)
- Charlie Tilson (2011), MLB outfielder for Chicago White Sox
- Emma Vlasic (2015), ice hockey forward
- Alex Vlasic (did not graduate), Chicago Blackhawks defenseman
- Tommy Wingels (2006), NHL player

== Visual arts ==
- Ivan Albright, painter associated with magic realism
- Stieg Hedlund (1983), game development leader, designer, artist, and writer
- Dewitt Jones, photographer and film producer known for his association with the National Geographic Society
- Nancy Spero (1944), feminist artist
- Paul O. Zelinsky (1970), children's picture book illustrator and writer
- Ryan Zoghlin (1985), artist and photographer

== Others ==
- Liz Crokin (1997), columnist and conspiracy theorist
- Laurie Dann (1975), perpetrator of a school shooting in Winnetka
- Ari Emanuel, talent agent and founder of the Endeavor Agency
- Anna Halprin (Ann Schuman) (1938), modern dancer
- Sharon Percy Rockefeller (1980), former First Lady of West Virginia and the chief executive officer of WETA-TV
- Benjamin Nathaniel Smith (did not graduate), white supremacist spree killer
- Larry Sweeney (1999), real name Alex Whybrow, professional wrestler and manager
- Charlie Trotter (1977), chef, restaurateur and author
- Brad Will (1988), anarchist, activist, and documentary filmmaker who was killed in Mexico
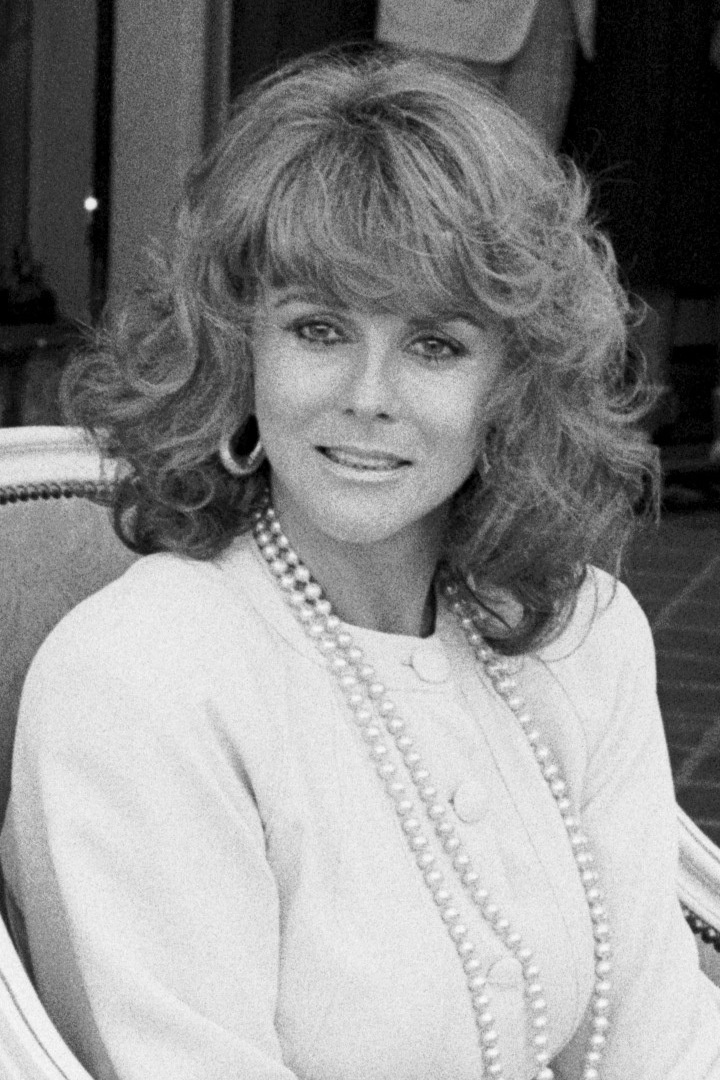
Ann-Margret

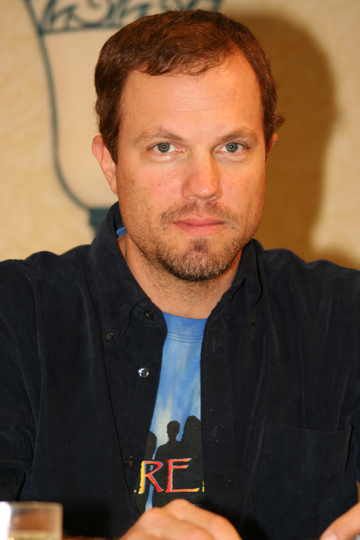
Adam Baldwin

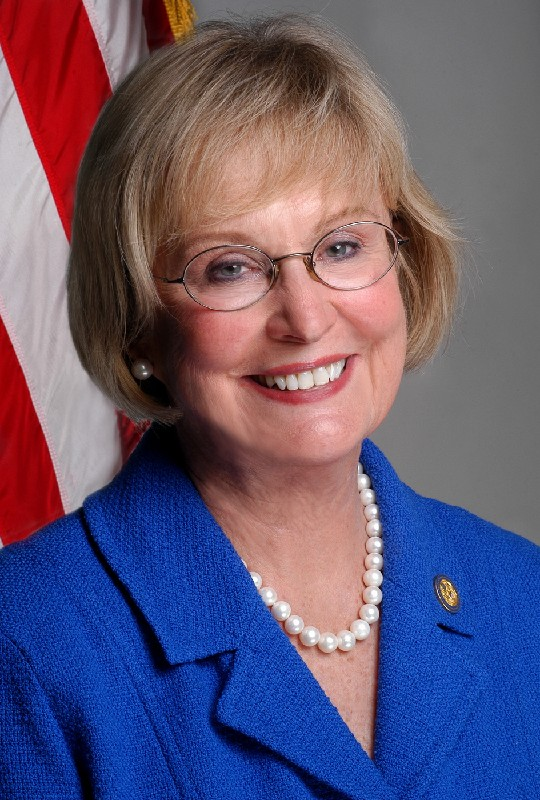
Judy Biggert

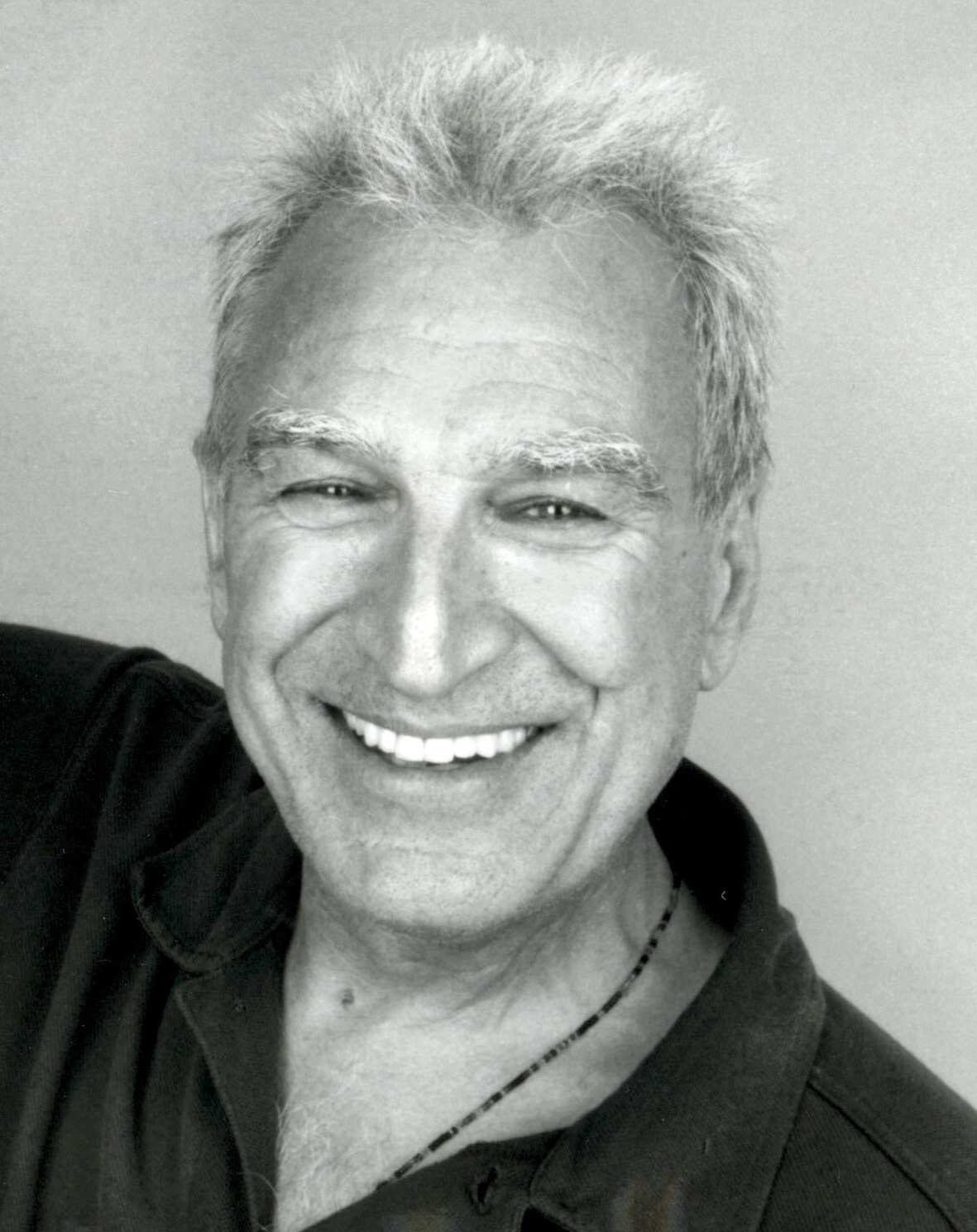
Marshall Chess

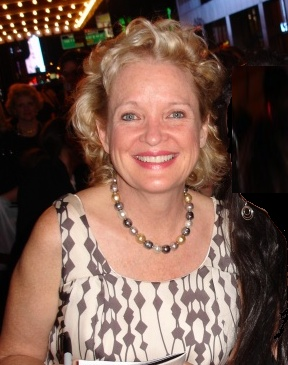
Christine Ebersole

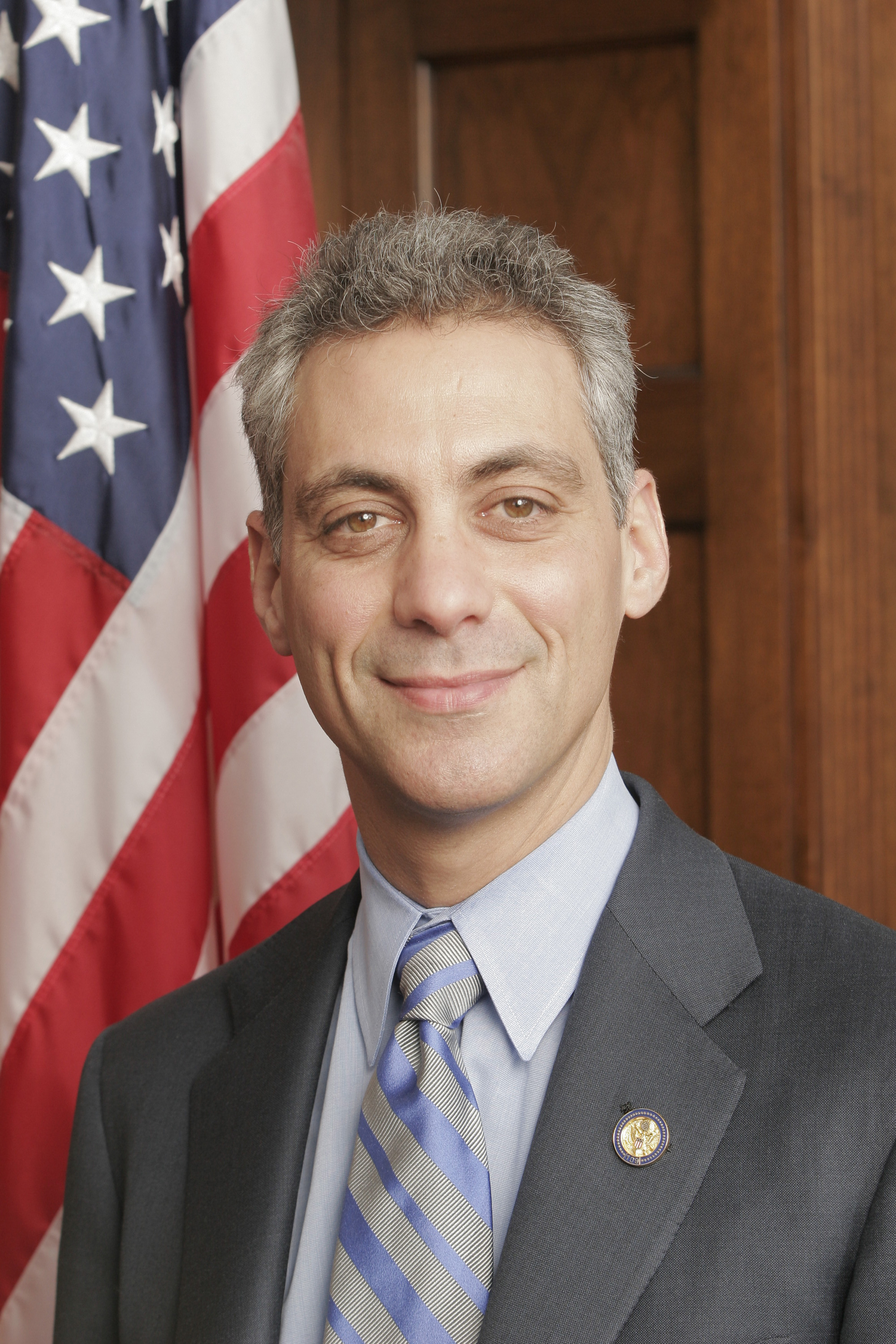
Rahm Emanuel

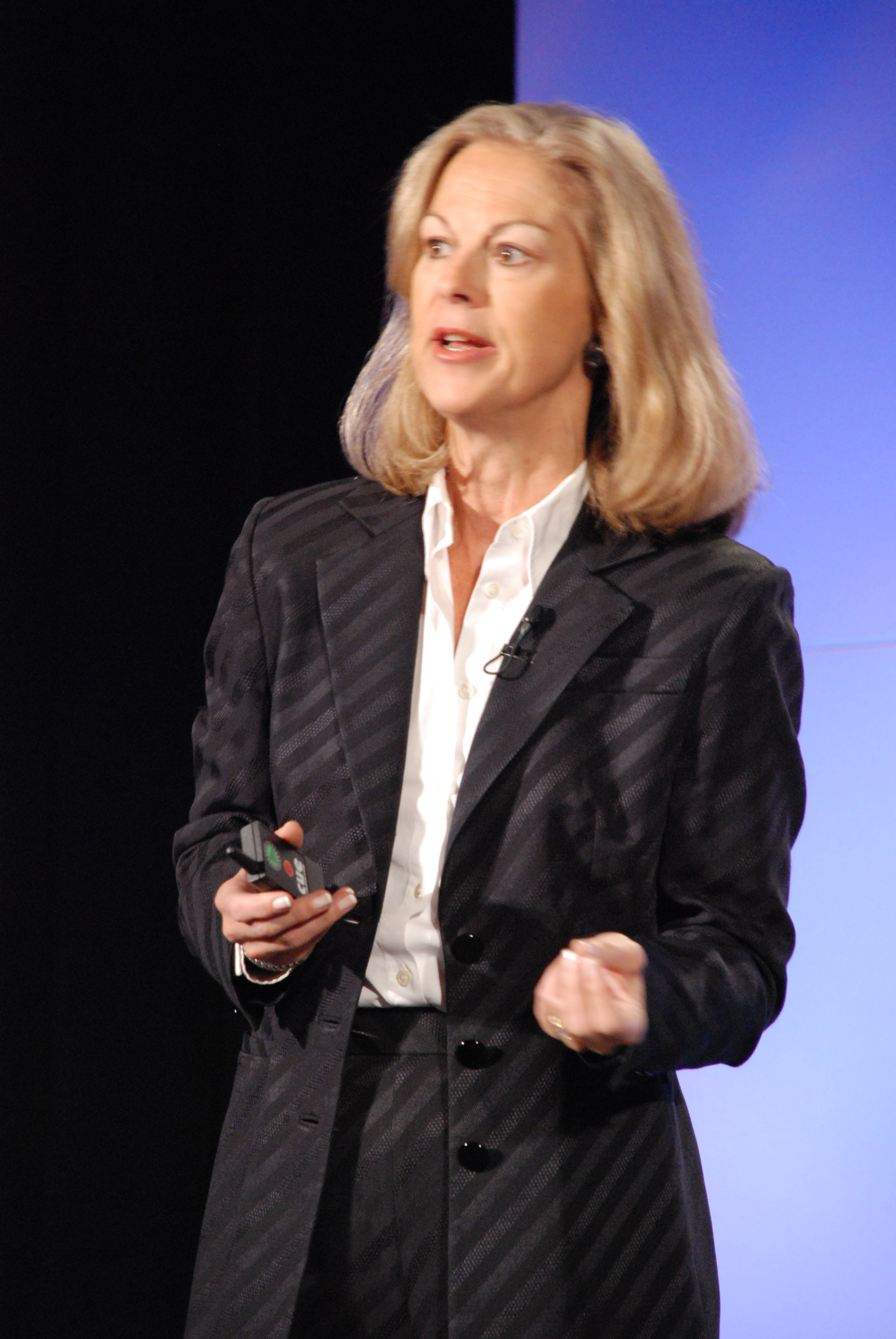
Christie Hefner

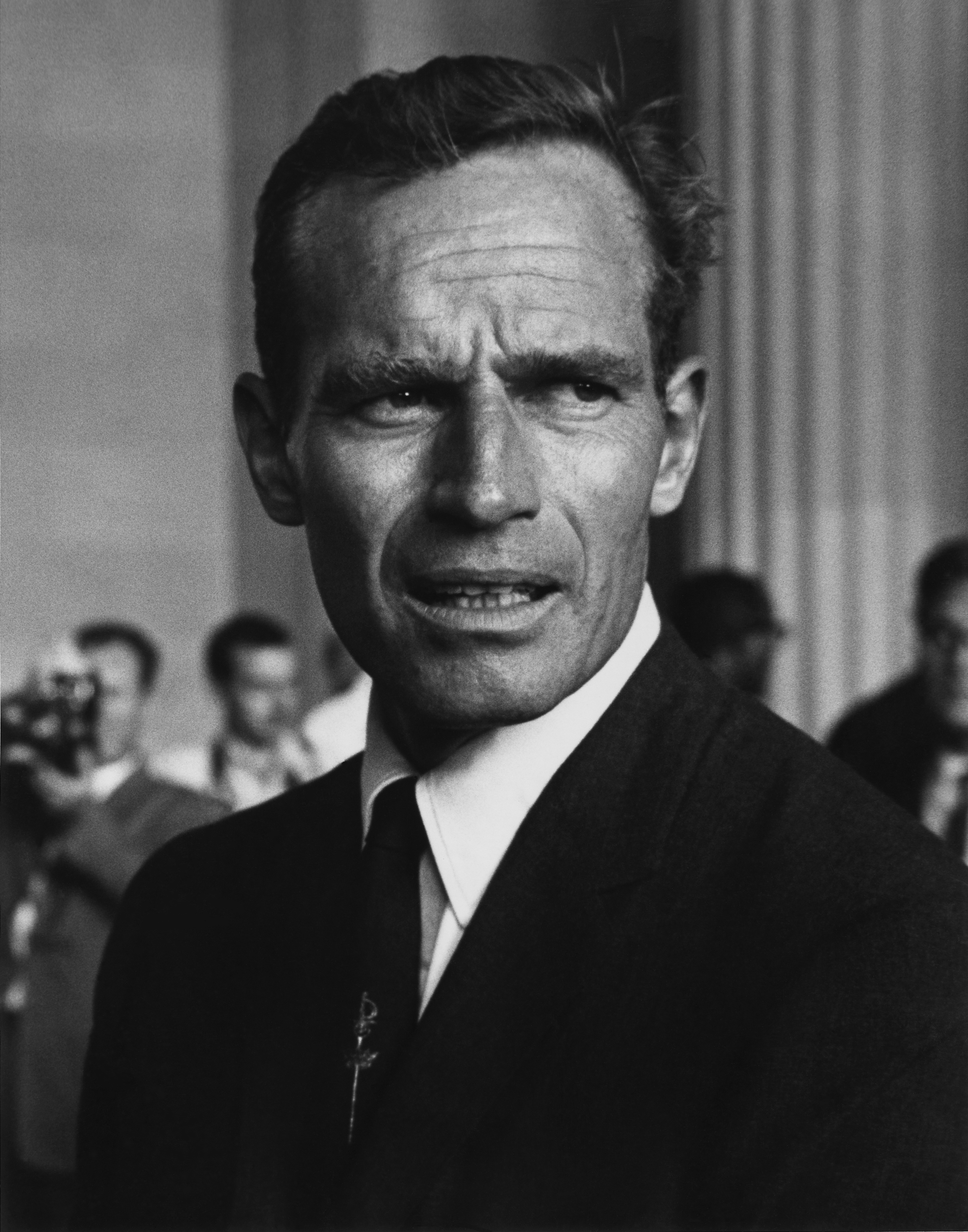
Charlton Heston

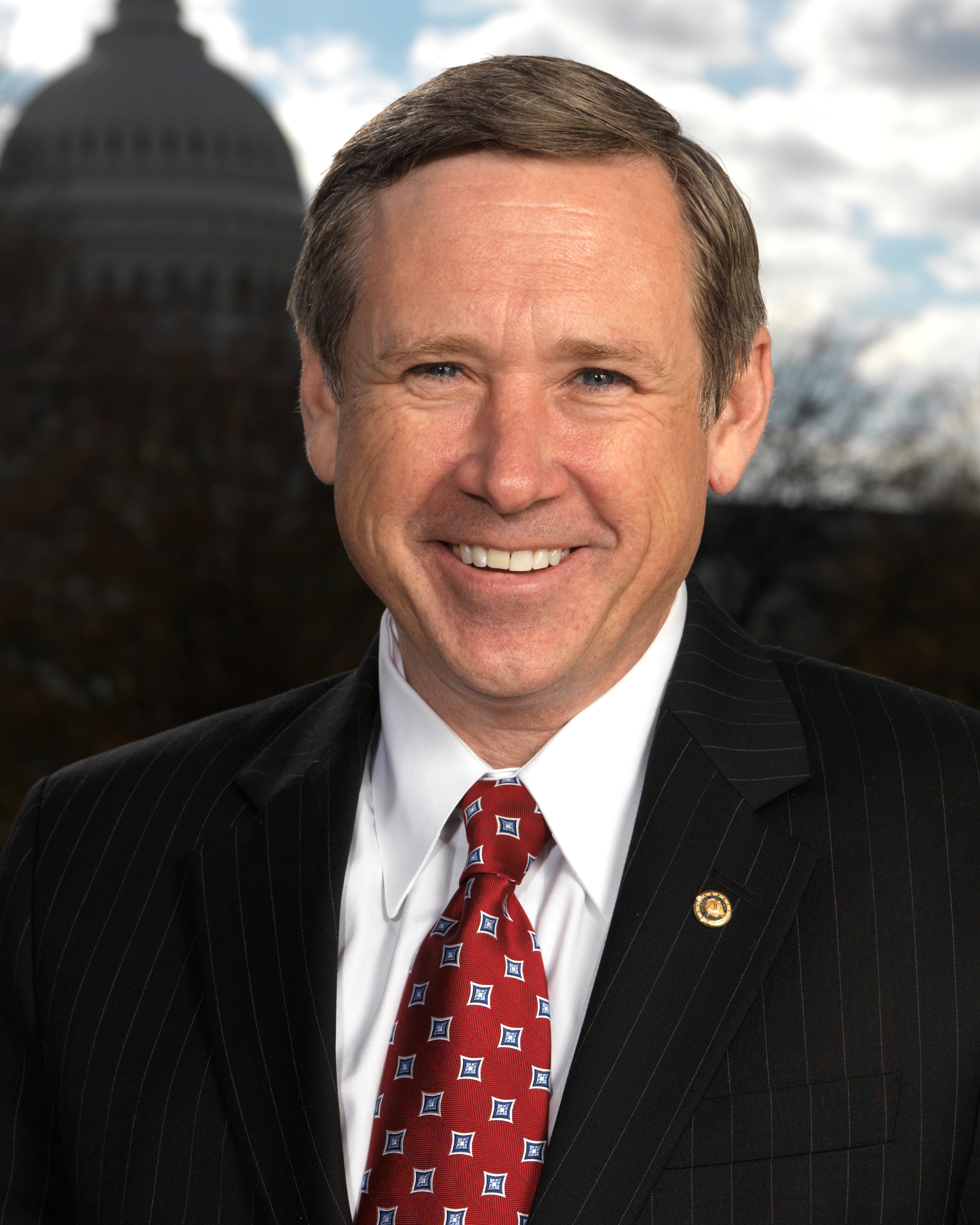
Mark Kirk

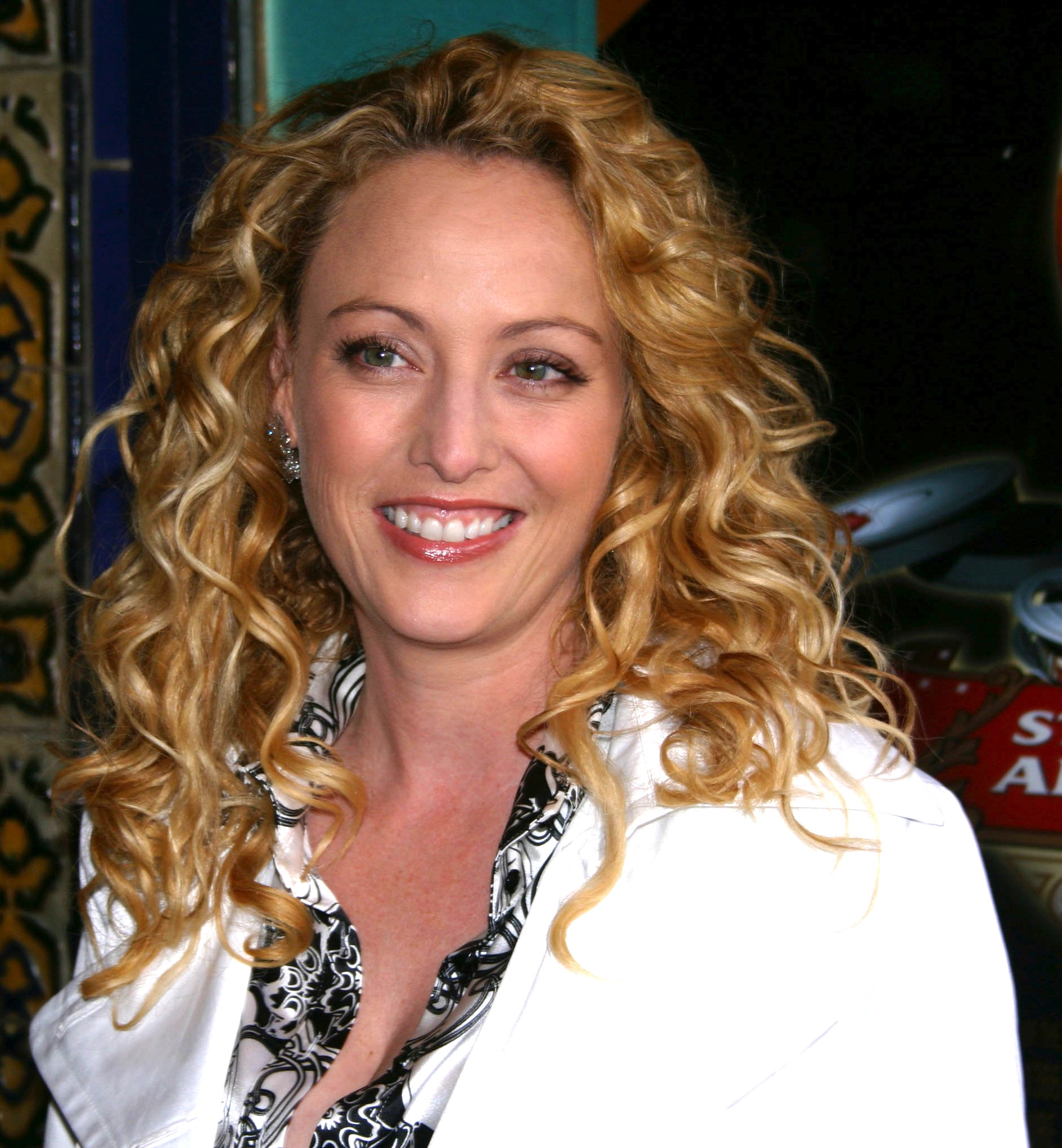
Virginia Madsen

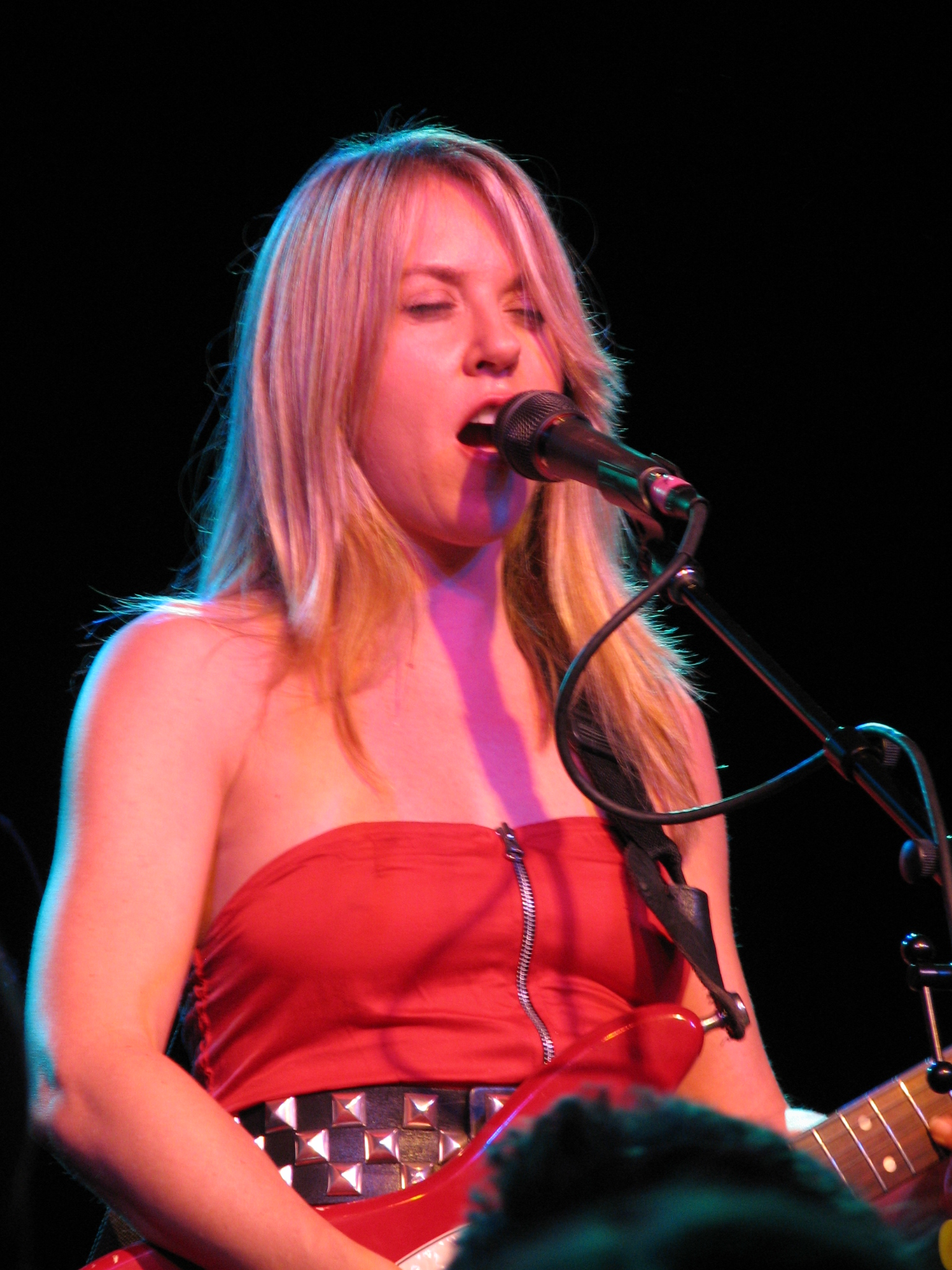
Liz Phair

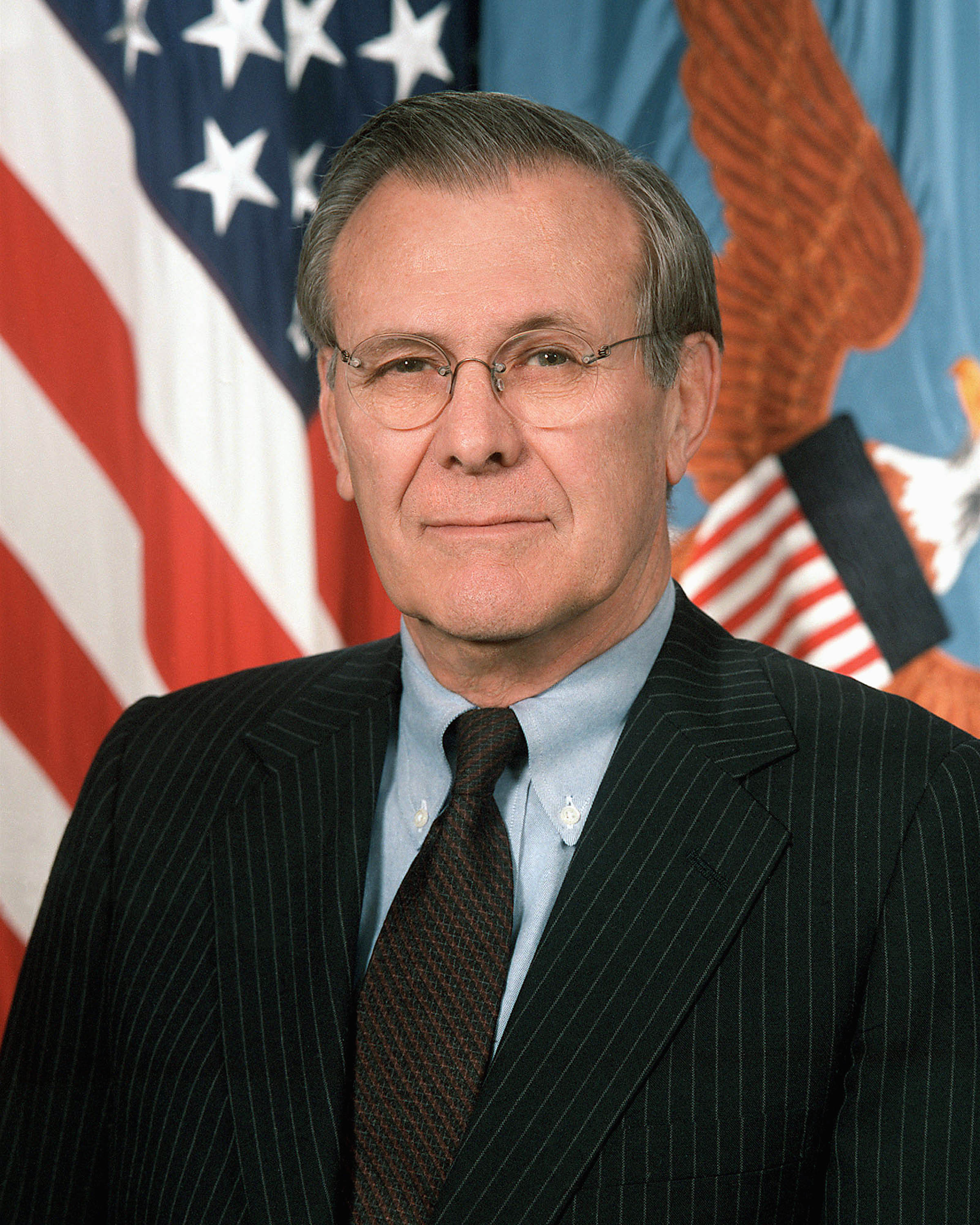
Donald Rumsfeld

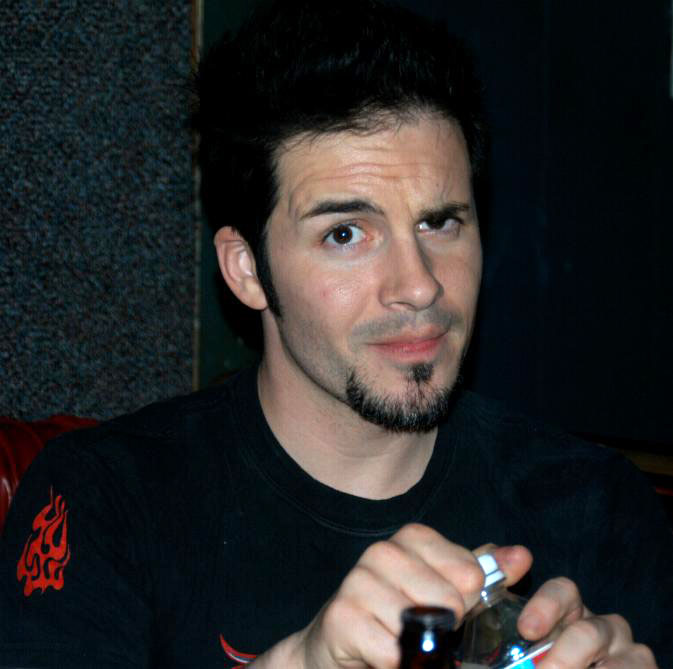
Hal Sparks

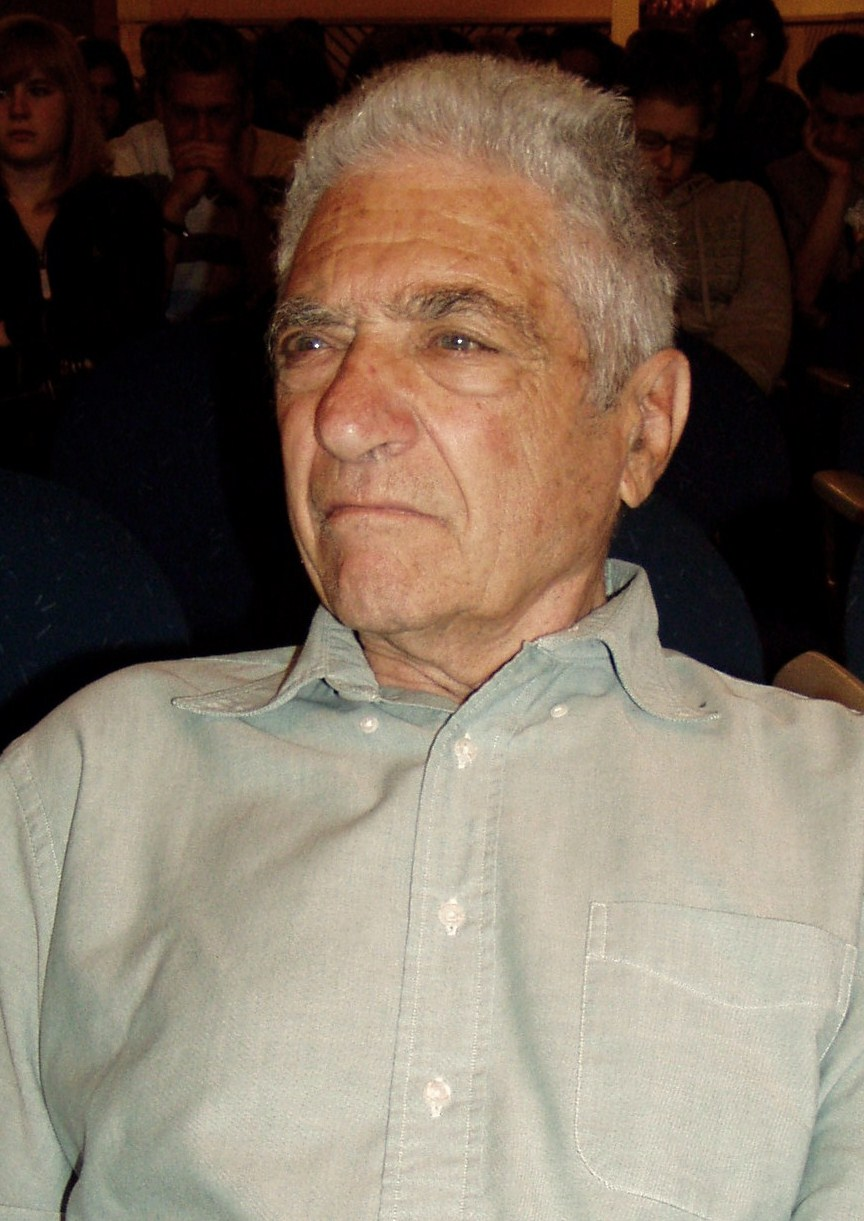
Jack Steinberger

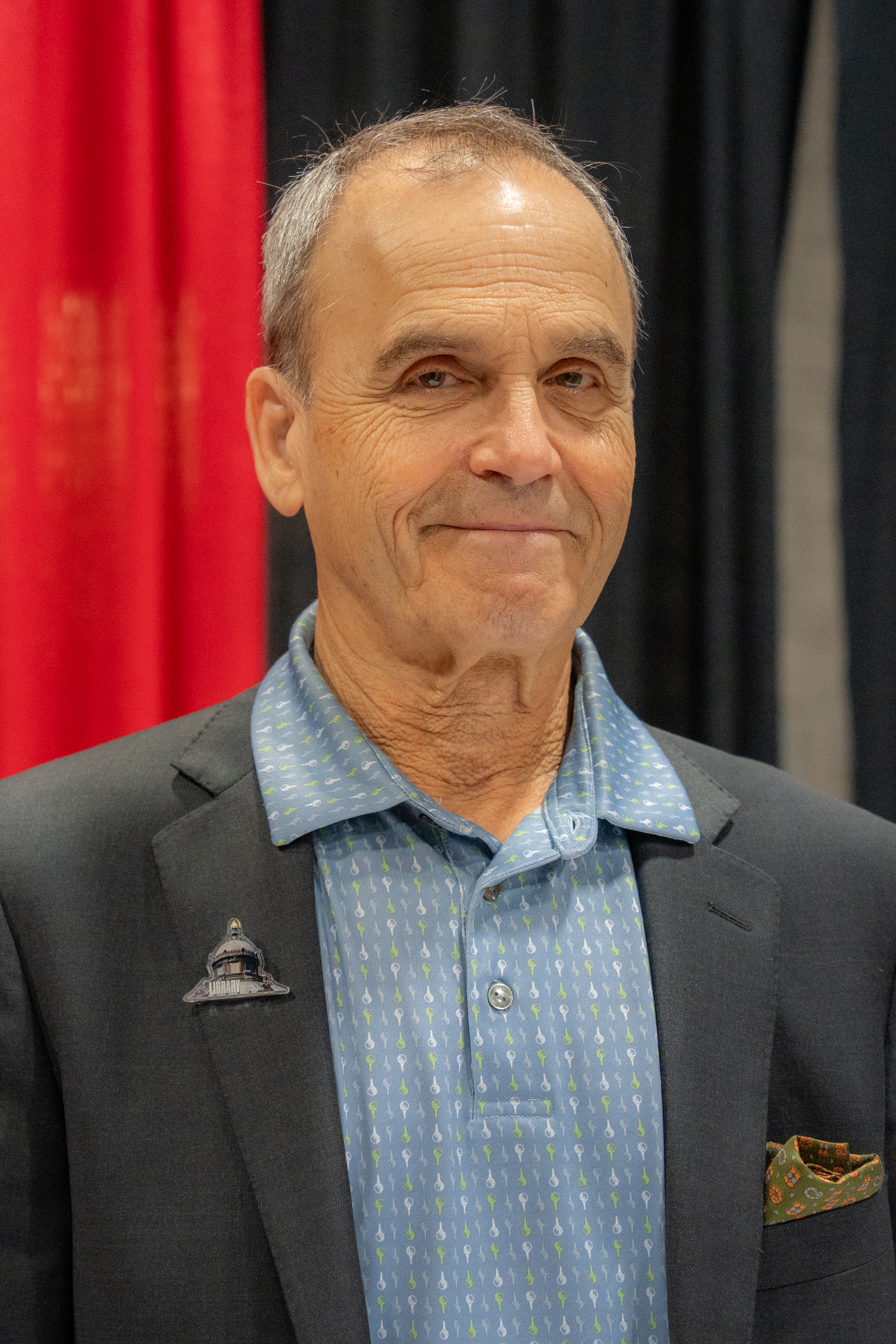
Scott Turow

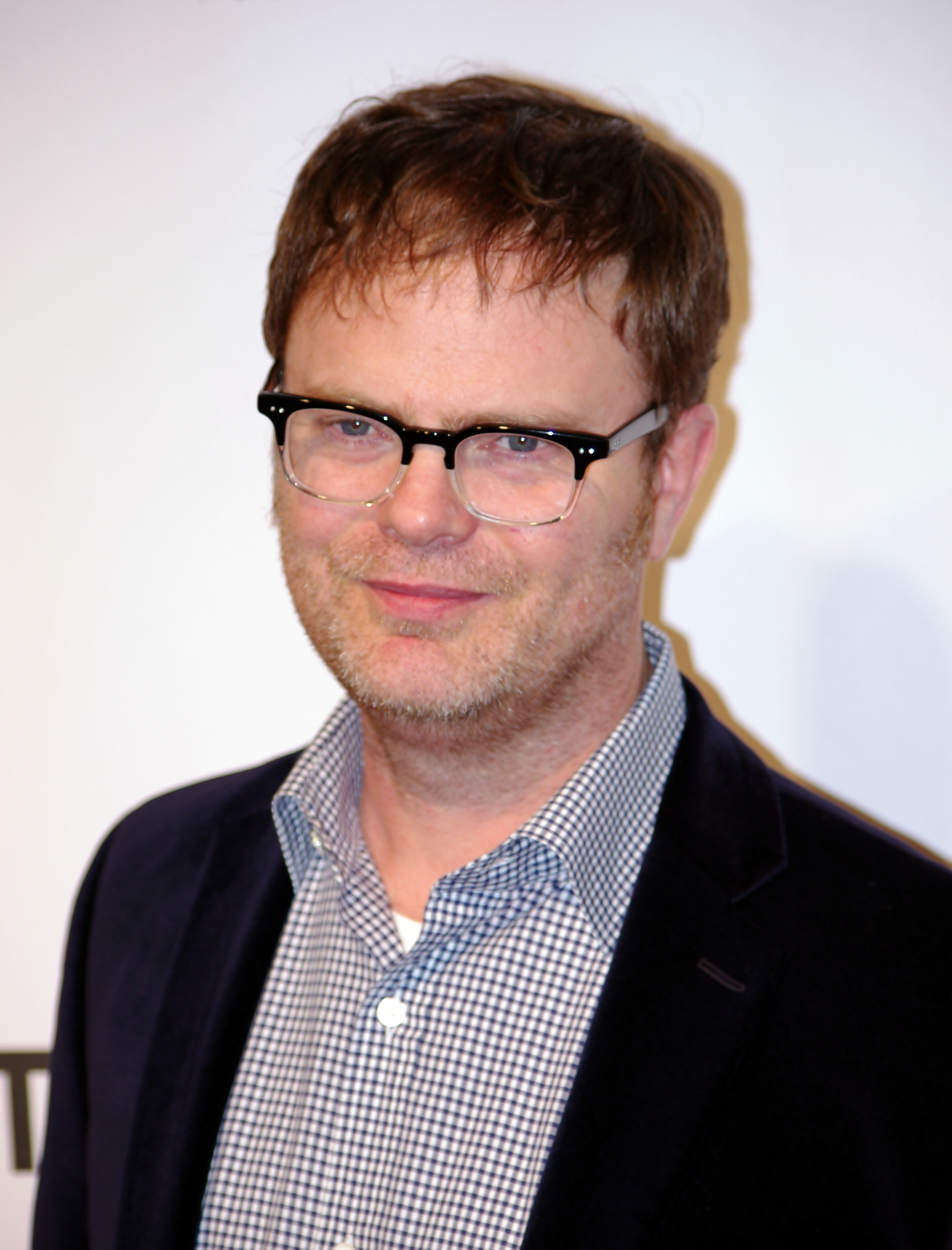
Rainn Wilson
