= Marc-Édouard Vlasic =

Canadian ice hockey player (born 1987)

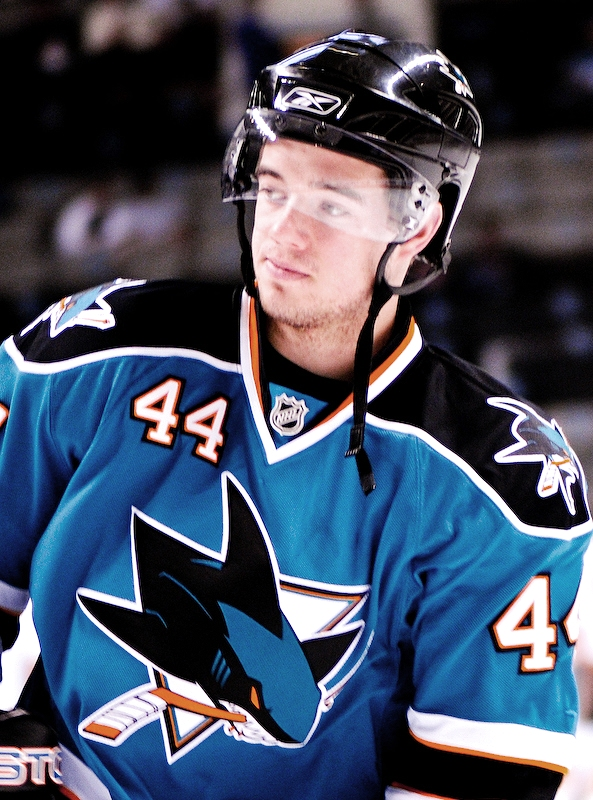
- Vlasic with the San Jose Sharks in 2008
- Born: March 30, 1987 (age 39) Montreal, Quebec, Canada
- Height: 6 ft 1 in (185 cm)
- Weight: 205 lb (93 kg; 14 st 9 lb)
- Position: Defence
- Shoots: Left
- team Former teams: Free agent San Jose Sharks
- National team: Canada
- NHL draft: 35th overall, 2005; San Jose Sharks
- Playing career: 2006–present

Marc-Édouard Vlasic (Croatian: Vlašić; born March 30, 1987) is a Canadian professional ice hockey player who is a defenceman. He most recently played for the San Jose Sharks of the National Hockey League (NHL), for whom Vlasic holds the franchise record for most games played by a defenseman and the NHL record for blocked shots.

== Playing career ==
Vlasic began playing organized hockey in Montreal at the age of five under his father's coaching. As a result of his skills, Vlasic was bumped up to the novice A level at the age of seven and eventually advanced to the midget-AAA Lac St. Louis Lions. He then played for the midget-AAA West Island Lions from 2002 to 2003 being drafted to the Quebec City Remparts of the QMJHL. Vlasic was chosen by the Remparts in the fourth round of the 2003 QMJHL draft after his Lac St. Louis Lions coach, Guy Boucher, convinced Patrick Roy to draft him. Vlasic played two games with the Lions during the 2003–04 season before being recalled the Remparts on September 16, 2003, for the remainder of the season.

Although Vlasic was not originally selected to compete in the 2004 CHL Canada/Russia Series, he was chosen to replace an injured Sidney Crosby on the roster. At the time of the selection, Vlasic had accumulated two goals and nine assists through 26 games.

=== San Jose Sharks (2006–2025) ===
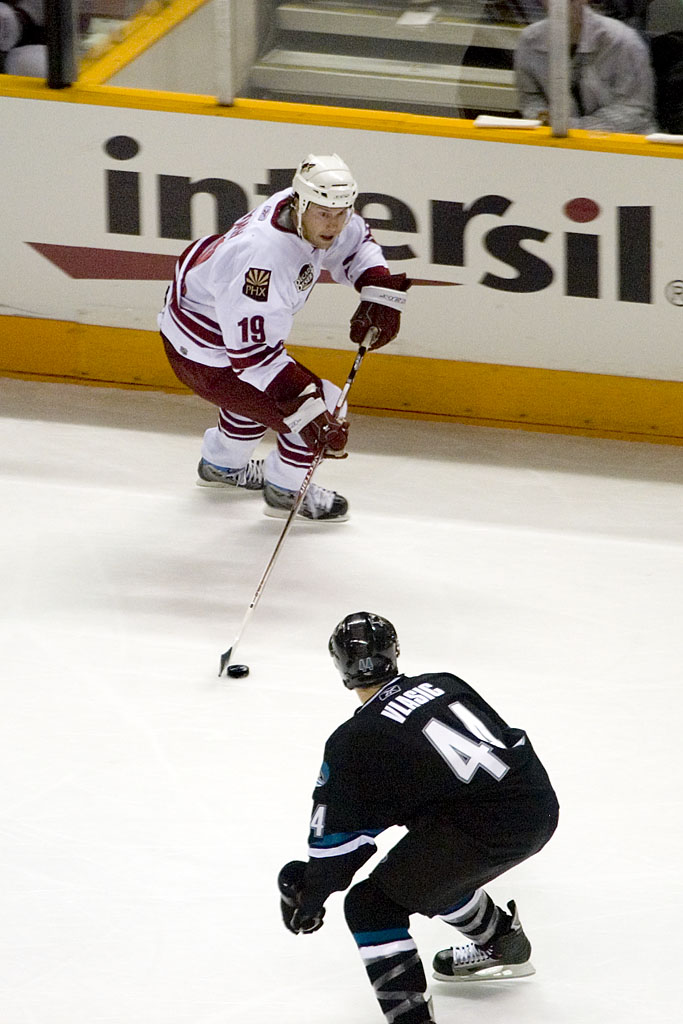
Vlasic (bottom) defending Shane Doan during a game against the Phoenix Coyotes in 2006.

Vlasic was drafted by the San Jose Sharks 35th overall in the 2005 NHL entry draft, using a pick exchanged for goaltender Miikka Kiprusoff. After making the Sharks' opening night roster at the age of 19, he made his NHL debut on October 5, 2006, against the St. Louis Blues. He subsequently scored his first career NHL goal on November 22, 2006, against the Los Angeles Kings. Upon scoring the goal, Vlasic became the second youngest defenseman in franchise history to score their first NHL goal at the age of 19 years and 237 days. He finished the 2006–07 season with three goals and 23 assists for 26 points through 81 games. As such, he was named to the NHL All-Rookie Team alongside teammate Matt Carle.

On August 27, 2008, the San Jose Sharks signed Vlasic to a four-year, $12.4 million contract extension that would keep him with the team through the 2012–13 season. On July 11, 2012, the Sharks signed Vlasic to a five-year, $21 million contract extension that would keep him with the Sharks through the 2017–18 season.

Early in the 2012–13 season, Vlasic became the second player from the 2005 draft class to play 500 games, and later scored his first career Stanley Cup playoffs goal, during the 2013 playoffs, against Jonathan Quick of the Los Angeles Kings.

On July 1, 2017, he signed a $56 million, eight-year contract extension with the Sharks.

Vlasic played his 1,000th NHL game on December 14, 2019; he was only the 17th player to play his first 1,000 games with one team.

Vlasic suffered an upper back injury during the off-season which resulted in him missing the start of the Sharks' 2024 training camp. Vlasic returned to play a career low 27 regular season games, notching 1 goal and 3 points.

Following the 2024–25 season, the Sharks placed Vlasic on unconditional waivers and upon clearing was bought out of the remaining year on his contract, ending his 19-year tenure with San Jose.

== International play ==
Medal record

ice hockey

Representing Canada

Winter Olympics
Gold medal – first place	2014 Sochi	

World Championships
Silver medal – second place	2009 Bern	
Silver medal – second place	2017 Germany/France	

World Cup of Hockey
Gold medal – first place	2016 Toronto	

Vlasic was named to the 2014 Canadian Olympic Hockey Team where his team won Gold against Sweden 3–0.

Following the Sharks defeat by the Vegas Golden Knights in the second round of the 2018 Stanley Cup playoffs, Vlasic was invited to play for Team Canada at the 2018 IIHF World Championship.

== Personal life ==
Of Croatian and French-Canadian descent, Vlasic has three younger brothers, Thomas, Charles, and James, the last two being twins. He attended West Island College in Quebec. He was previously married to his high school sweetheart, Martine. His cousin, Emma Vlasic, played for the Connecticut Whale of the Premier Hockey Federation, and was former captain of Yale's women's hockey team, and her younger brother, Alex, plays for the Chicago Blackhawks.

The Quebec Remparts retired Vlasic's number 44 in 2015.

== Career statistics ==
=== Regular season and playoffs ===
			Regular season					Playoffs
Season	Team	League	GP	G	A	Pts	PIM	GP	G	A	Pts	PIM
2002–03	West Island Lions	QMAAA	41	4	6	10	14	9	0	3	3	0
2003–04	West Island Lions	QMAAA	2	1	1	2	0	—	—	—	—	—
2003–04	Quebec Remparts	QMJHL	41	1	9	10	4	5	0	1	1	0
2004–05	Quebec Remparts	QMJHL	70	5	25	30	33	13	2	7	9	2
2005–06	Quebec Remparts	QMJHL	66	16	57	73	57	23	5	24	29	10
2006–07	San Jose Sharks	NHL	81	3	23	26	18	11	0	1	1	2
2007–08	San Jose Sharks	NHL	82	2	12	14	24	13	0	1	1	0
2007–08	Worcester Sharks	AHL	1	0	2	2	0	—	—	—	—	—
2008–09	San Jose Sharks	NHL	82	6	30	36	42	6	0	1	1	0
2009–10	San Jose Sharks	NHL	64	3	13	16	33	15	0	3	3	4
2010–11	San Jose Sharks	NHL	80	4	14	18	18	18	0	3	3	4
2011–12	San Jose Sharks	NHL	82	4	19	23	40	5	0	0	0	2
2012–13	San Jose Sharks	NHL	48	3	4	7	29	11	1	1	2	6
2013–14	San Jose Sharks	NHL	81	5	19	24	38	5	1	2	3	0
2014–15	San Jose Sharks	NHL	70	9	14	23	23	—	—	—	—	—
2015–16	San Jose Sharks	NHL	67	8	31	39	48	24	1	11	12	12
2016–17	San Jose Sharks	NHL	75	6	22	28	35	6	0	3	3	2
2017–18	San Jose Sharks	NHL	81	11	21	32	34	10	0	2	2	6
2018–19	San Jose Sharks	NHL	72	3	22	25	10	18	3	5	8	4
2019–20	San Jose Sharks	NHL	70	5	10	15	10	—	—	—	—	—
2020–21	San Jose Sharks	NHL	51	1	5	6	8	—	—	—	—	—
2021–22	San Jose Sharks	NHL	75	3	11	14	18	—	—	—	—	—
2022–23	San Jose Sharks	NHL	78	1	17	18	16	—	—	—	—	—
2023–24	San Jose Sharks	NHL	57	6	6	12	26	—	—	—	—	—
2024–25	San Jose Sharks	NHL	27	1	2	3	2	—	—	—	—	—
NHL totals			1,323	84	295	379	472	142	6	33	39	42

=== International ===
Year	Team	Event	Result	GP	G	A	Pts	PIM
2009	Canada	WC	2nd place, silver medalist(s)	5	0	0	0	4
2012	Canada	WC	5th	2	0	0	0	0
2014	Canada	OG	1st place, gold medalist(s)	6	0	0	0	0
2016	Canada	WCH	1st place, gold medalist(s)	6	0	4	4	0
2017	Canada	WC	2nd place, silver medalist(s)	10	1	1	2	2
2018	Canada	WC	4th	6	1	0	1	0
Senior totals				35	2	5	7	6

== Awards and honours ==
Award	Year	Ref
NHL
NHL All-Rookie Team	2006–07	
