= Sally Larsen =

American artist and photographer (born 1954)

Sally Larsen (born 1954) is an American artist and photographer.

== Early life ==
Larsen was born in 1954 in San Francisco, California of mixed Apache and Aleut descent.

== Career ==
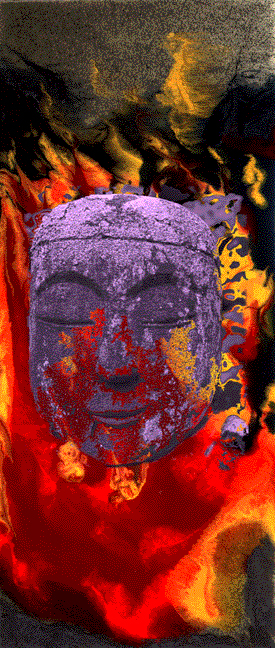
A scanned painting by Larsen layered together with a photograph

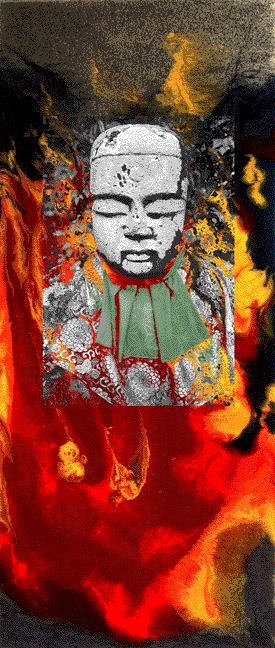
A scanned painting by Larsen layered together with a photograph

Larsen exhibits photographs, videos and paintings in San Francisco, New York City, Los Angeles, Honolulu, and Chicago. She employs a wide variety of materials and digital tools.

=== Works ===
- 2008: The German Eye in America. Using digital tools directed through the internet to study German photography in America, Sally Larsen proposes that genetic memory and epigenetic issues sway aesthetics. The physical basis for the study center is a library of books and magazines which contain published photographs of the Americas taken by German-born photographers. This ongoing project utilizes the internet and clearly defined determining factors to propose and assemble a comprehensive visual data mine involving more than 500 photographers and spanning 160 years.
- 2006: DNA: the Diaspora of Native Americans. Sally Larsen poses questions about the genetics of aesthetics and the confluence of art and genetics. Her ongoing DNA email campaign proposes to unite all Native Americans via DNA testing to self define the greater Diaspora of Native Americans.
- 2001: Jizo Series. In the wake of the September 11 attacks, Larsen began a large-scale C- print series which melds her photographic oeuvre with expressive hi-color gluon paintings.

== During the 1980s and 1990s ==
- 2000: Millenniumm Time Capsule and Water, a Word Worth a Thousand Pictures at the Oakland Museum of California use multi-media to explore the complex issue of water.
- 2000: In the Manner of Animals celebrates twenty years of Chinese cultural exploration and martial art study with The Little Fighting Man Series.
- 1993: Japlish presents 10 years of Sally Larsen's Asian photography from the streets of Tokyo, Osaka and Kyoto.
- 1991: Sally Larsen exhibits orotone prints of photographs taken in an infamous Tokyo cabaret known as Shiroi Heya or The White Room.
- 1990: Transformer becomes the first digital fine art print included in the permanent collection of the New York City Metropolitan Museum of Art. Working with David Coons and Graham Nash, Sally Larsen creates the Transformer series of Iris Ink jet prints in 1989. She had begun experimenting with digital imaging in the mid-1980s.
- 1982: Sally Larsen begins an ongoing series of monochrome images presented as orotone photographs (gold-leafed gelatin silver prints on glass).

== Installations with projected video frescos ==
San Francisco (Yerba Buena Center Surf Trip 2000); Oakland (Oakland Museum Millennium Time Capsule 2000); Los Angeles (Bergemot Station Surf Trip 2001); and Seattle (Sacred Circle Big Bang 2001).

== Publications ==
- 1993: Japlish (Pomegranate Art Books, San Francisco 1993; ISBN 1-56640-454-1) photographic monograph on Japanese T-shirt culture. Introduction by Neeli Cherkovski.
- 2000: -ine poems & In the Manner of Animals (Solo Zone 2000) features The Little Fighting Man / Hsin I series of orotone photographs. With Bartolomé Alberti.
