= Jake Johnson =

American actor (born 1978)

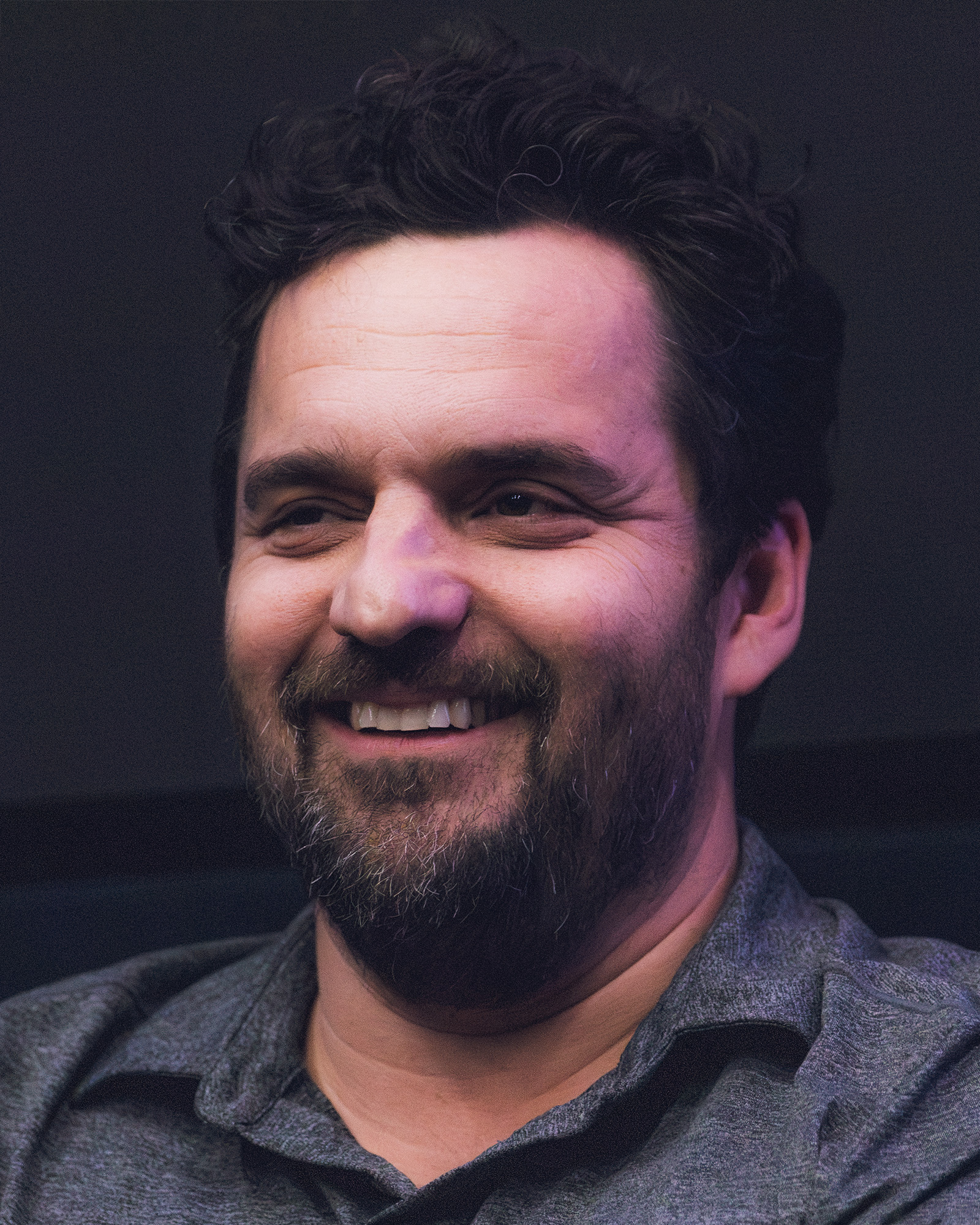
- Johnson in 2026
- Born: Mark Jake Johnson Weinberger; May 28, 1978 (age 48); Evanston, Illinois, U.S.
- Education: University of Iowa; New York University Tisch School of the Arts
- Occupations: Actor; filmmaker
- Years active: 2002–present
- Spouse: Erin Payne (m. 2006)
- Children: 2

Mark Jake Johnson Weinberger (born May 28, 1978) is an American actor. He starred as Nick Miller in the Fox sitcom New Girl (2011–2018), for which he was nominated for the Critics' Choice Television Award for Best Actor in a Comedy Series in 2013. He is also known for voicing Peter B. Parker/Spider-Man in the animated film Spider-Man: Into the Spider-Verse (2018) and its 2023 sequel.

Johnson also starred in Let's Be Cops (2014), and appeared in Paper Heart (2009), Safety Not Guaranteed (2012), 21 Jump Street (2012), Jurassic World (2015), The Mummy (2017), and Tag (2018). From 2022 to 2023, he starred in the comedy series Minx. In 2023, he made his directorial debut with Self Reliance.

== Early life ==
Johnson was born on May 28, 1978, in Evanston, Illinois, a northern suburb of Chicago, to Ken Weinberger, who owned a car dealership, and Eve Johnson, an artist who made stained glass windows. He was named after his maternal uncle, Mark Johnson, who died at the age of 26 in a motorcycle accident in 1977, a year before Jake was born. Johnson attended New Trier High School in Winnetka. His parents divorced when he was two, and he and his older siblings, brother Dan and sister Rachel, were raised by his single mother. Johnson then took his mother's last name during high school. He has stated that when he was 17, his father resurfaced and they became close. His father died in 2021.

== Career ==
Johnson grew up a fan of the Second City improv troupe. Raised in Winnetka, Illinois, he graduated from New Trier High School and started his post-secondary education at the University of Iowa. While in Iowa City, he wrote a play, which wound up earning him admission to the Dramatic Writing Department at NYU's Tisch School of the Arts, followed by the 2002 John Golden Playwriting Prize and the Sloan Fellowship for Screenwriting. The New York City off-Broadway group The Ensemble Studio Theater produced his play Cousins.

While in New York, Johnson started a sketch comedy troupe The Midwesterners, modeling their material and style after HBO's sketch comedy Mr. Show with Bob and David. After moving to Los Angeles, Johnson supported himself as a waiter and a production assistant, also scoring a series of bit feature and guest TV roles. In 2007, he landed a more regular gig with the TBS mini-show Derek and Simon: The Show, produced by Bob Odenkirk.

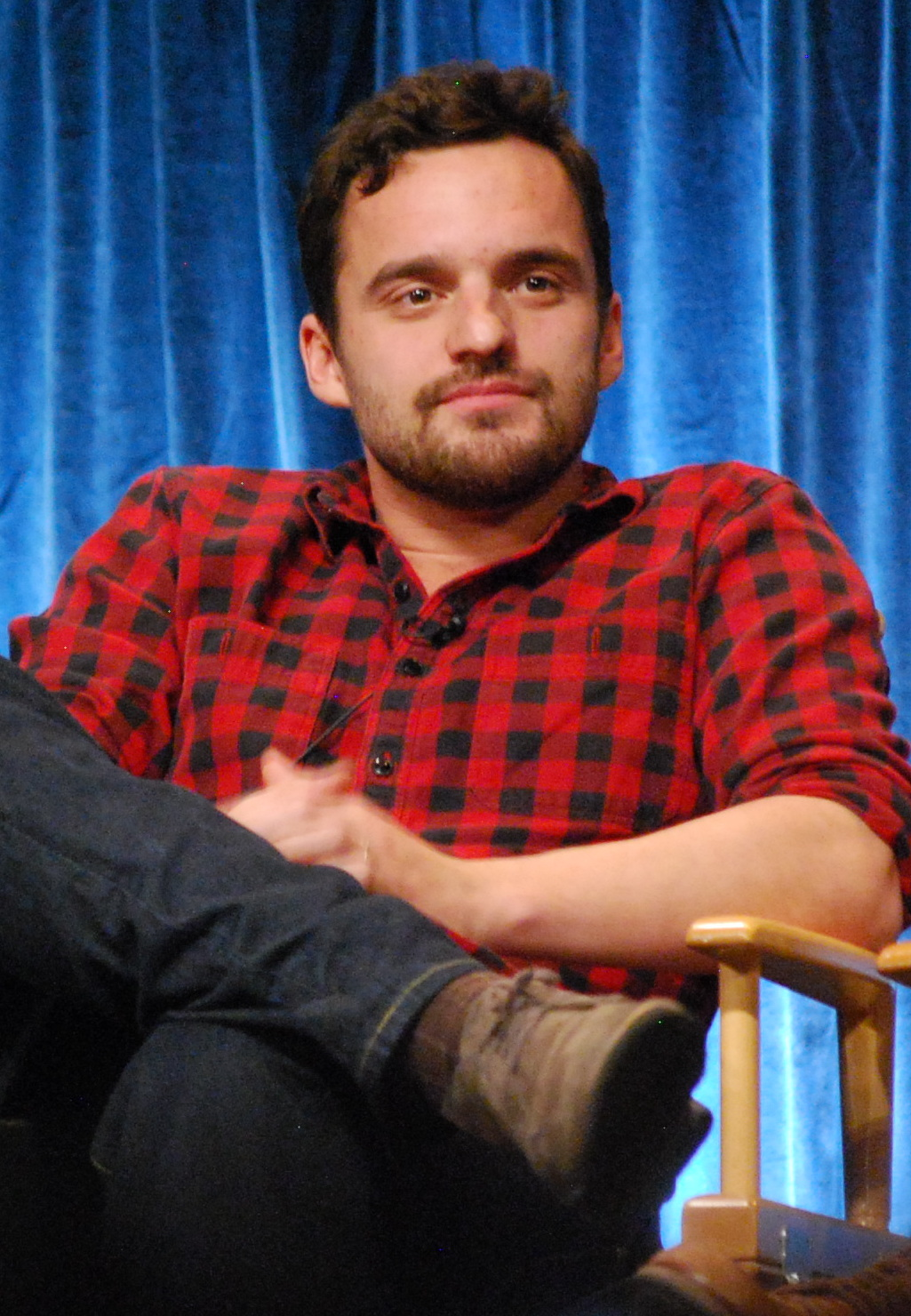
Johnson in 2012

In 2009, he appeared in the mockumentary Paper Heart. In 2010, Johnson was cast in a small role in the Russell Brand comedy, Get Him to the Greek. He played Uma Thurman's character's brother in the romantic comedy Ceremony, and as a buddy of Ashton Kutcher's character in No Strings Attached. In 2011, he played Jesus in A Very Harold & Kumar 3D Christmas. In 2012, he appeared in the film version of 21 Jump Street, which starred Jonah Hill and Channing Tatum. Johnson made an appearance at the 2012 Sundance Festival as one of the leads in Safety Not Guaranteed.

From 2011 to 2018, Johnson starred as Nick Miller alongside Zooey Deschanel on New Girl. In 2013, he appeared in the music video for "Rouse Yourself", a song by indie soul band JC Brooks & the Uptown Sound alongside his Safety Not Guaranteed co-star Aubrey Plaza. He also starred (as a fictional version of himself) in a series of Dodge Dart commercials with Craig Robinson. In 2015, he played park informatician Lowery Cruthers in Jurassic World. In 2017, Johnson starred as Eddie Garrett in the Netflix comedy film Win It All.

The web series Drunk History was inspired by a 2007 conversation that Johnson had with series creator Derek Waters. Johnson, while drunk, was trying to describe the story of Otis Redding's death to Waters, and Waters was inspired to build a series around history narrated by drunk people. Johnson later appeared in the first episode of the web series as Aaron Burr. After it was adapted for television under the same title on Comedy Central, he appeared in the eighth episode as William B. Travis, and the ninth episode of season three as Boris Spassky.

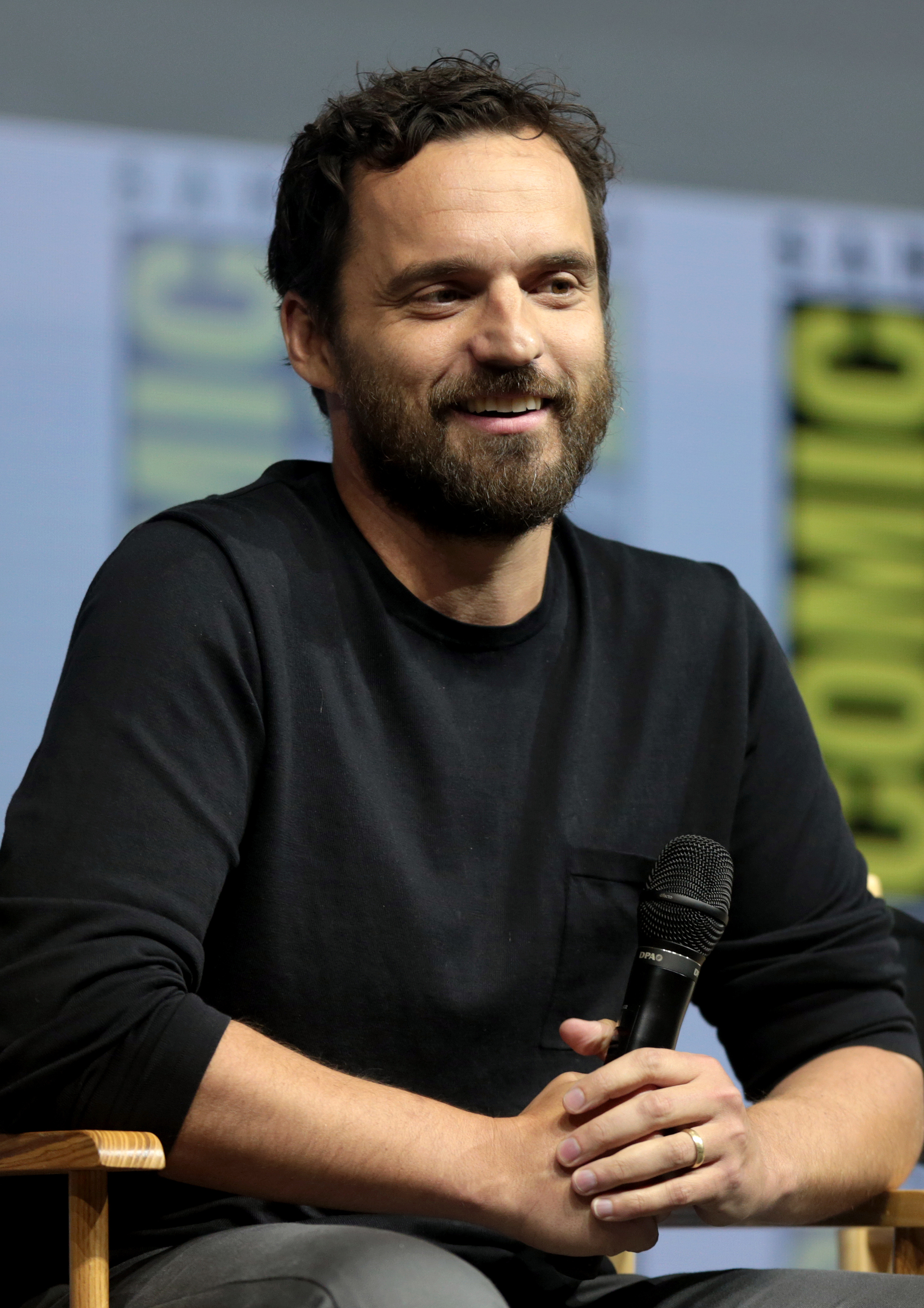
Johnson at the 2018 San Diego Comic-Con

In 2018, Johnson appeared in the comedy film Tag as Randy Cilliano. In the same year, it was announced that Johnson was cast in the lead role of Ben Hopkins in the Netflix adult animation series Hoops. Also that year, Johnson provided the voice of Peter B. Parker / Spider-Man in Spider-Man: Into the Spider-Verse.

In 2019, Johnson was cast in the lead role of Grey McConnell in the ABC drama series Stumptown; he took over the role from Mark Webber, who played the character in the original pilot episode.

In 2023, Johnson started an advice podcast entitled We're Here to Help with co-host Gareth Reynolds. The same year, he made his directorial debut with Self Reliance.

== Personal life ==
Johnson married Erin Payne, an artist, in 2006. They have twin daughters, Elizabeth and Olivia, born in 2014.

Johnson is a fan of several Chicago sports teams, including the Chicago Cubs and the Chicago Bears.

== Filmography ==
Key
†	Denotes films that have not yet been released

=== Film ===
Year	Title	Role	Notes
2007	Bunny Whipped	Basketball Player	
2008	Redbelt	Guayabera Shirt Man	
2009	Paper Heart	Nicholas Jasenovec	
2010	Get Him to the Greek	Jazz Man	
2010	Ceremony	Teddy	
2010	Spilt Milk	Todd	
2011	No Strings Attached	Eli	
2011	A Very Harold & Kumar 3D Christmas	Jesus Christ	
2012	Safety Not Guaranteed	Jeff Schwensen	
2012	21 Jump Street	Principal Dadier	
2013	Drinking Buddies	Luke Darlingson	
2013	The Pretty One	Basel	
2013	Coffee Town	Will's Roommate	
2014	The Lego Movie	Barry	Voice Cameo only
2014	Neighbors	Sebastian Cremmington	
2014	Let's Be Cops	Ryan J. O'Malley	
2015	Digging for Fire	Tim	Also writer/producer
2015	Jurassic World	Lowery Cruthers	
2016	Joshy	Reggie	
2016	Mike and Dave Need Wedding Dates	Ronnie	
2016	Lego Jurassic World: The Indominus Escape	Lowery Cruthers	Voice only; Short film; Direct-to-video
2017	Win It All	Eddie Garrett	Also writer/producer
2017	Smurfs: The Lost Village	Grouchy Smurf	Voice only
2017	Flower	Raymond Vandross	Uncredited
2017	Becoming Bond	Peregrine Carruthers	Documentary
2017	The Mummy	Chris Vail	
2018	Tag	Randy "Chilli" Cilliano	
2018	Spider-Man: Into the Spider-Verse	Peter B. Parker / Spider-Man	Voice only
2021	Ride the Eagle	Leif	Also writer/producer
2023	Self Reliance	Tommy	Also writer/producer/director
2023	Spider-Man: Across the Spider-Verse	Peter B. Parker / Spider-Man	Voice only
2026	The Sun Never Sets	Jack	Also producer
2026	The Dink	Dusty Boyd	Also producer
2026	Wildwood	Mr. McKeel	Voice only
2027	Spider-Man: Beyond the Spider-Verse †	Peter B. Parker / Spider-Man	Voice only; In production

=== Television ===
Year	Title	Role	Notes
2007	Derek and Simon: The Show	Jake	6 episodes
2007	Curb Your Enthusiasm	Man on Cell Phone	Episode: "The N Word"
2007	The Unit	Martin	Episode: "MPs"
2009	Lie to Me	Howard Crease	Episode: "Love Always"
2010	FlashForward	Powell	Episode: "Countdown"
2011–2018	New Girl	Nick Miller	Main cast; 146 episodes Directed episode: "Bob & Carol & Nick & Schmidt"; Nominated – Critics' Choice Television Award for Best Actor in a Comedy Series (2013); Nominated – TCA Award for Individual Achievement in Comedy (2013); Nominated – Teen Choice Award for Best Actor Comedy (2012, 2013); Nominated – Satellite Award for Best Actor – Television Series Musical or Comedy (2013)
2011	Allen Gregory	Joel Zadak (voice)	6 episodes
2012	NTSF:SD:SUV::	Jorgen	Episode: "The Real Bicycle Thief"
2013	Ghost Ghirls	Eddie Hanson	Episode: "Home Is Where The Haunt Is"
2013; 2015	High School USA!	Mr. Structor (voice)	Main role
2013–2019	Drunk History	Various	3 episodes
2015	Comedy Bang! Bang!	Himself	Episode: "Jake Johnson Wears a Light Blue Button-Up Shirt and Brown Shoes"
2015	No Activity	Cutler	Episode: "The American"
2015–2017	BoJack Horseman	Oxnard (voice)	3 episodes
2016	We Bare Bears	Dave (voice)	Episode: "The Island"
2016–2017	Idiotsitter		2 episodes
2016–2019	Easy	Drew	2 episodes
2017	Comrade Detective	Stan (voice)	Recurring role; 5 episodes
2017–2019	No Activity	DEA Agent John Haldeman	3 episodes
2019–2020	Stumptown	Grey McConnell	Main cast
2020	Mythic Quest: Raven's Banquet	Doc Michael	Episode: "A Dark Quiet Death"
2020	Hoops	Ben Hopkins (voice)	10 episodes; also executive producer
2022	Roar	Greg	Episode: "The Woman Who Found Bite Marks on Her Skin"
2022	Lost Ollie	Daddy	Main cast
2022–2023	Minx	Doug Renetti	Main cast; also co-executive producer
2023	History of the World, Part II	Marco Polo	Episode: "II"
2026	Maximum Pleasure Guaranteed	Karl	Main cast
2027	Sunset P.I. †	Mickey Wilder	Main cast

=== Video games ===
Year	Title	Role	Notes
2015	Lego Jurassic World	Lowery Cruthers	Voice
2015	Lego Dimensions	Lowery Cruthers	Voice

=== Music videos ===
Year	Title	Role	Notes
2019	"Hot Shower"	Jimmy Dickerson	

=== Playwright ===
Year	Title	Role	Publisher
2002	Cousins	Writer	Ensemble Studio Theater
