= Orotone =

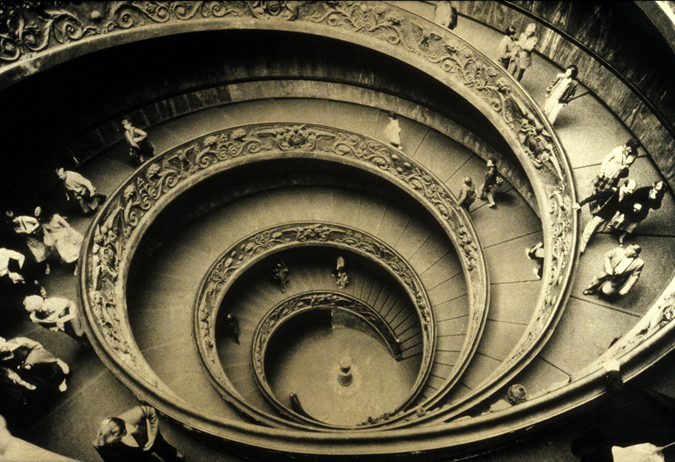
"Vatican Museums Double Spiral", orotone print by Sally Larsen, 1983

An orotone or gold tone is one of many types of photographic print which can be made from a negative. An orotone photograph is created by printing a positive on a glass plate precoated with a silver gelatin emulsion. Following exposure and development, the back of the plate is coated with banana oil impregnated with gold-colored pigment, to yield a gold-toned image. Alternatively, the developed glass plate can be gold-leafed by hand with 23-karat gold leaf. Being printed on glass, orotone images are extremely fragile and often require specialized frames in order to prevent breakage. Other types of prints can be made with the same negative used to make an orotone. Consequently, silver gelatin prints and platinotypes (platinum and palladium prints) are also made by those who produce orotone prints.

== Then and now ==
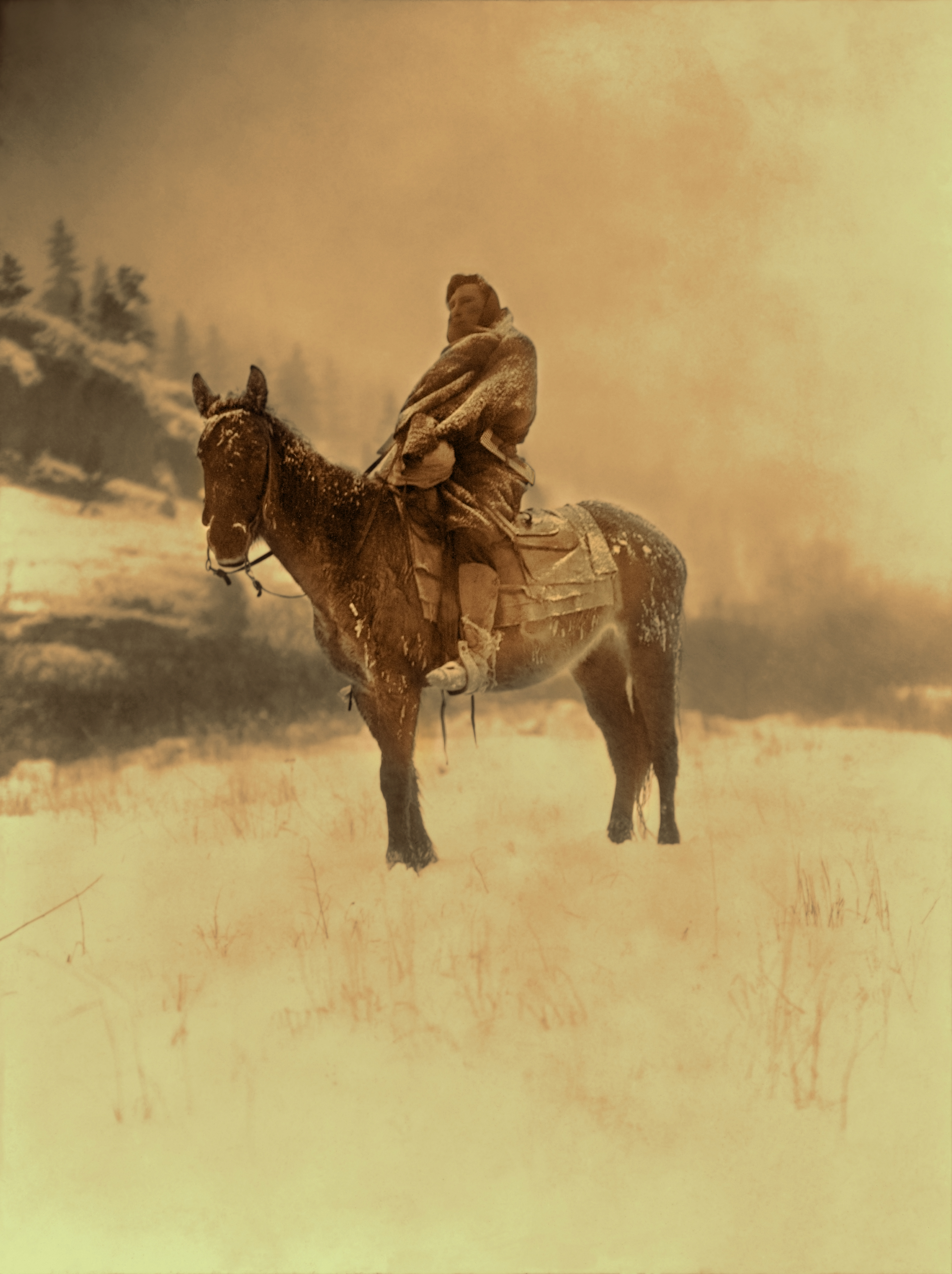
A faux orotone created in Photoshop by emulating the colors of actual orotone prints

The making of orotone prints was a contemporary art in the early twentieth century. Orotones are often to be seen in interiors associated with the Arts and Crafts movement. Many of these orotones are by the Seattle photographer Edward S. Curtis, who produced hundreds of orotone photographs of Native Americans during his career. Curtis developed the "Curt-Tone", using techniques which he claimed were superior.

Curtis promoted his process as follows:

"The ordinary photographic print, however good, lacks depth and transparency, or more strictly speaking, translucency. We all know how beautiful are the stones and pebbles in the limpid brook of the forest where the water absorbs the blue of the sky and the green of the foliage, yet when we take the same iridescent pebbles from the water and dry them they are dull and lifeless, so it is with the ordinary photographic print, but in the Curt-Tones all the transparency is retained and they are as full of life and sparkle as an opal."

Sally Larsen (who gold-leafs each developed plate by hand) and Ryan Zoghlin are modern practitioners of orotone photography.
