= Alex Vlasic =

American ice hockey player (born 2001)

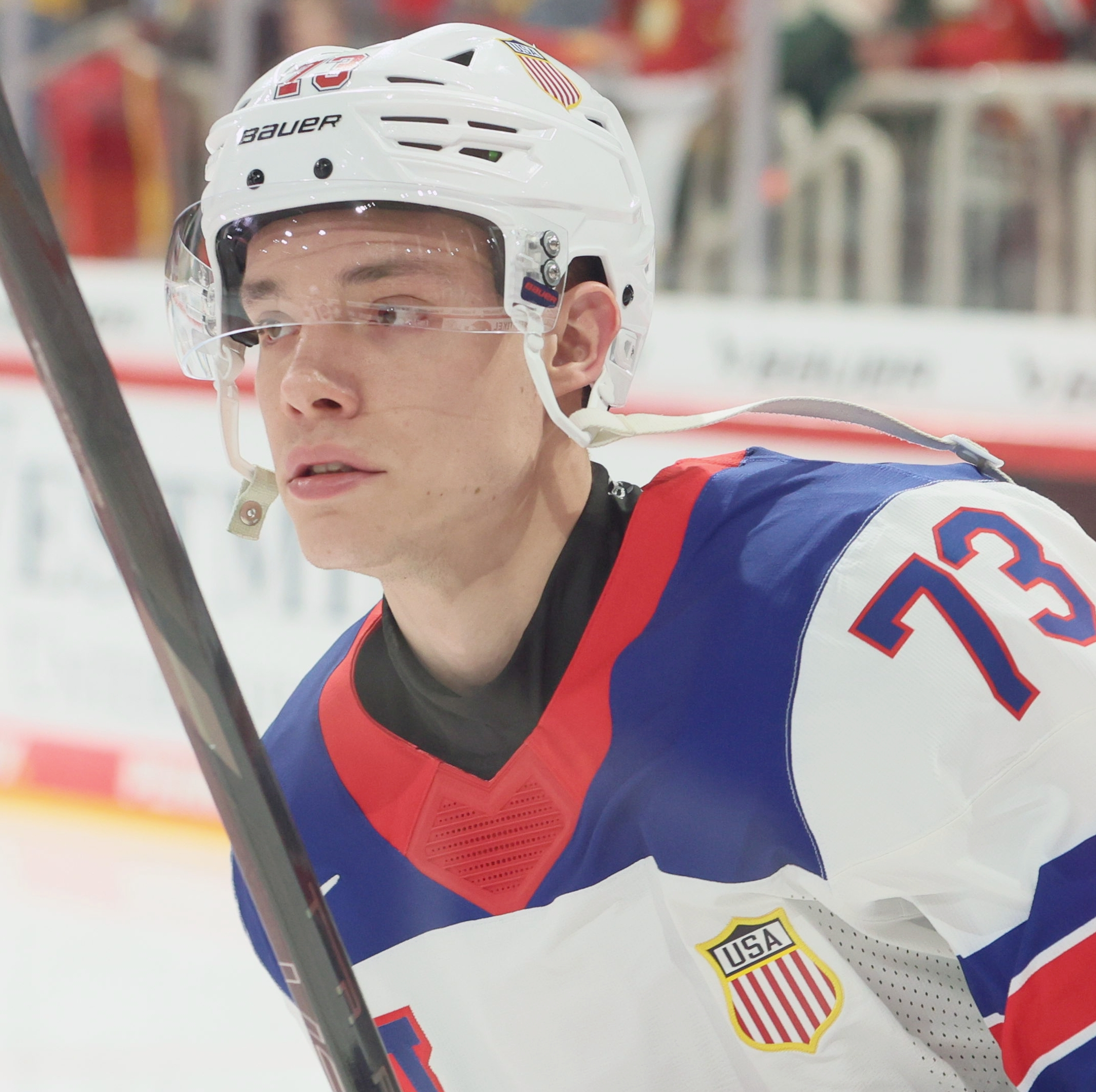
- Vlasic with the United States national team in 2025
- Born: June 5, 2001 (age 25) Wilmette, Illinois, U.S.
- Height: 6 ft 6 in (198 cm)
- Weight: 217 lb (98 kg; 15 st 7 lb)
- Position: Defense
- Shoots: Left
- NHL team: Chicago Blackhawks
- National team: United States
- NHL draft: 43rd overall, 2019; Chicago Blackhawks
- Playing career: 2022–present

Alex Vlasic (born June 5, 2001) is an American professional ice hockey player who is a defenseman for the Chicago Blackhawks of the National Hockey League (NHL). He was selected by the Blackhawks in the second round, 43rd overall, in the 2019 NHL entry draft.

== Early life ==
Vlasic was born on June 5, 2001, in Wilmette, Illinois to parents Tara and John, and grew up alongside his older siblings Emma and Eric. He is of Croatian descent; his grandfather immigrated to Montreal. Despite growing up in Illinois, Vlasic was a fan of the San Jose Sharks due to his cousin Marc-Édouard Vlasic's affiliation with them. Vlasic began skating at the age of three and played organized ice hockey with the Wilmette Braves at the Mite, Squirt and Pee Wee levels. His older siblings were also involved in the sport, as Emma played at Yale University and with the Connecticut Whale while his brother participated in the Chicago Blackhawks special hockey program. He played as a forward until he was nine years old when he switched to defense. He was diagnosed with celiac disease aged 13.

== Playing career ==
Growing up in Illinois, Vlasic played for the Chicago Young Americans and Chicago Mission. While playing with the Chicago Mission Midget U16 team, Vlasic committed to play college ice hockey for the Boston University Terriers. At the time of the commitment, Vlasic was also considered a top five draft pick for the Ontario Hockey League (OHL). Instead of joining the OHL, Vlasic was recruited to play for the USA Hockey National Team Development Program (NTDP) for the 2017–18 USHL season. He later credited the NTDP's intense and fast-paced practices with improving his game, along with the assistance of the under-17 coaching staff including John Wroblewski and Greg Moore. He also praised the addition of Dan Hinote as an associate head coach for furthering his development and muscle growth.

=== College ===
Vlasic played three seasons with the Boston University Terriers, while enrolled in the Boston University College of Arts and Sciences. Prior to his first year with the Terriers, Vlasic was drafted in the second round, 43rd overall, by the Chicago Blackhawks in the 2019 NHL entry draft. Following the draft, Vlasic reaffirmed his commitment to play collegiate career with the Terriers. He subsequently joined the Terriers for the 2019–20 season where he played in 34 games and recorded four assists. His first collegiate assist came on October 18, 2019, in 4–4 tie with the Northern Michigan Wildcats. When the season was cut short due to the COVID-19 pandemic, Vlasic and his sister created a makeshift weight room in the basement of their home and skated at a local ice rink. He also worked on his skills development with Tristan Musser, who was then with the Chicago Steel, and with Brian Keane who owns Prodigy Hockey.

Once the 2020–21 season began, Vlasic stated he felt his confidence soar as he was able to "figure how to use my size as an advantage and protect the puck much better." On January 23, 2021, Vlasic recorded his first career multi-point game in a 5–1 win over the University of Maine. On February 5, he recorded his first collegiate goal to lead the Terriers to a 4–3 overtime loss to Boston College. By March, he had tallied three goals and five assists for eight points through 15 games.

The following season, Vlasic became one of the best defensive defensemen in the conference and was praised by his head coach for being an "elite skater for his size." He led the team with 50 blocked shots and also tallied one goal and a career-high seven assists for eight points. As a result of his improved play, Vlasic earned Hockey East All-Star honors.

=== Professional ===
Vlasic signed a three-year, entry-level contract with the Chicago Blackhawks on March 15, 2022, after concluding his college career. Vlasic played in his first NHL game on March 19, against the Minnesota Wild in which the Blackhawks lost 3–1. He signed a six-year contract extension with Chicago on April 25, 2024.

== International play ==
Medal record

Representing United States

Men's ice hockey

World Championships
Gold medal – first place	2025 Sweden/Denmark	

Vlasic represented the United States at the 2025 World Championship, where he recorded two assists in 10 games and helped the United States win their first gold medal since 1933.

== Career statistics ==
=== Regular season and playoffs ===
			Regular season					Playoffs
Season	Team	League	GP	G	A	Pts	PIM	GP	G	A	Pts	PIM
2017–18	U.S. National Development Team	USHL	34	4	9	13	12	8	1	2	3	18
2018–19	U.S. National Development Team	USHL	27	2	13	15	28	—	—	—	—	—
2019–20	Boston University	HE	34	0	4	4	10	—	—	—	—	—
2020–21	Boston University	HE	16	3	5	8	10	—	—	—	—	—
2021–22	Boston University	HE	32	1	7	8	31	—	—	—	—	—
2021–22	Chicago Blackhawks	NHL	15	1	1	2	2	—	—	—	—	—
2022–23	Rockford IceHogs	AHL	56	2	17	19	25	5	0	5	5	0
2022–23	Chicago Blackhawks	NHL	6	0	1	1	0	—	—	—	—	—
2023–24	Chicago Blackhawks	NHL	76	2	14	16	45	—	—	—	—	—
2024–25	Chicago Blackhawks	NHL	82	4	26	30	12	—	—	—	—	—
2025–26	Chicago Blackhawks	NHL	81	2	19	21	17	—	—	—	—	—
NHL totals			260	9	61	70	76	—	—	—	—	—

=== International ===
Year	Team	Event	Result	GP	G	A	Pts	PIM
2017	United States	U17	1st place, gold medalist(s)	6	1	2	3	2
2019	United States	U18	3rd place, bronze medalist(s)	7	0	1	1	6
2024	United States	WC	5th	8	0	2	2	0
2025	United States	WC	1st place, gold medalist(s)	10	0	2	2	0
Junior totals				13	1	3	4	8
Senior totals				18	0	4	4	0
