= Ryan Zoghlin =

American artist and photographer

Ryan Zoghlin is an artist and photographer.

== Biography ==
After gaining a solid technical background in photographic illustration from Rochester Institute of Technology, Ryan explored photography as an art form at School of the Art Institute of Chicago, where he received his BFA in photography and sculpture in 1991. Images from his series "Airshow" are included in the collections of the Museum of Fine Arts, Houston and have been included in Midwest Photographers Project at the Museum of Contemporary Photography in Chicago. These images have also been published in Black & White Magazine and the Center for Photography at Woodstocks, Photography Quarterly.

== Photography ==
Zoghlin works in many alternative process such as orotone, kallitype, and cyanotype etc. His orotones from the series "Aerotones" are produced on glass and backed with 23.5 karat gold powder. These images are considered examples of modern orotones by the Research on the Conservation of Photographs Project at the Getty Conservation Institute.

== Sources ==
- Black & White Magazine. Novato, CA: Ross Periodicals. December 2003, Issue #28, Pages 118–121
- Photography Quarterly. Center for Photography at Woodstock, Woodstock NY, Issue #91, 2005 Pages 16–17
- Camera Arts. March/April 2007 Artist Showcase Page 12.
