= Emma Vlasic =

American ice hockey forward (born 1996)

- Born: September 2, 1996 (age 29) Wilmette, Illinois, U.S.
- Height: 171 cm (5 ft 7 in)
- Position: Forward
- Shoots: Left
- PHF team: Connecticut Whale
- Played for: Yale University
- Playing career: 2019–present

Emma Vlasic (born September 2, 1996) is an American ice hockey forward who played for the now defunct Connecticut Whale in the PHF.

== Career ==
Across four NCAA seasons at Yale, Vlasic put up 45 points in 113 games, serving as team captain in the 2018–19 season.

On the 1st of August 2019, Vlasic signed her first professional contract with the Connecticut Whale. In her rookie PHF season, Vlasic scored 9 goals in 24 games, leading the Whale in goals as the team finished last in the league. She was noted for her strong two-way play, finishing third in the league in faceoff percentage. She has been touted as a potential franchise centre for the club, being named to the 2020 NWHL All-Star Game for Team Dempsey.

== Personal life ==
Vlasic was born on September 2, 1996, in Wilmette, Illinois to parents Tara and John, and grew up alongside her brothers Eric and Alex. She is of Croatian descent; her grandfather immigrated to Montreal. Her brothers are also involved in hockey; Alex plays for the Chicago Blackhawks while Eric participated in the Chicago Blackhawks Special Hockey program. Her cousin Marc-Édouard played professional hockey for the San Jose Sharks.

== Career statistics ==
			Regular season					Playoffs
Season	Team	League	GP	G	A	Pts	PIM	GP	G	A	Pts	PIM
2019-20	Connecticut Whale	PHF	24	9	0	9	14	2	0	3	3	0
2020-21	Connecticut Whale	PHF
PHF totals			24	9	0	9	14	2	0	3	3	0
