= Prince videography =

Videos and media by American singer-songwriter

Prince video discography
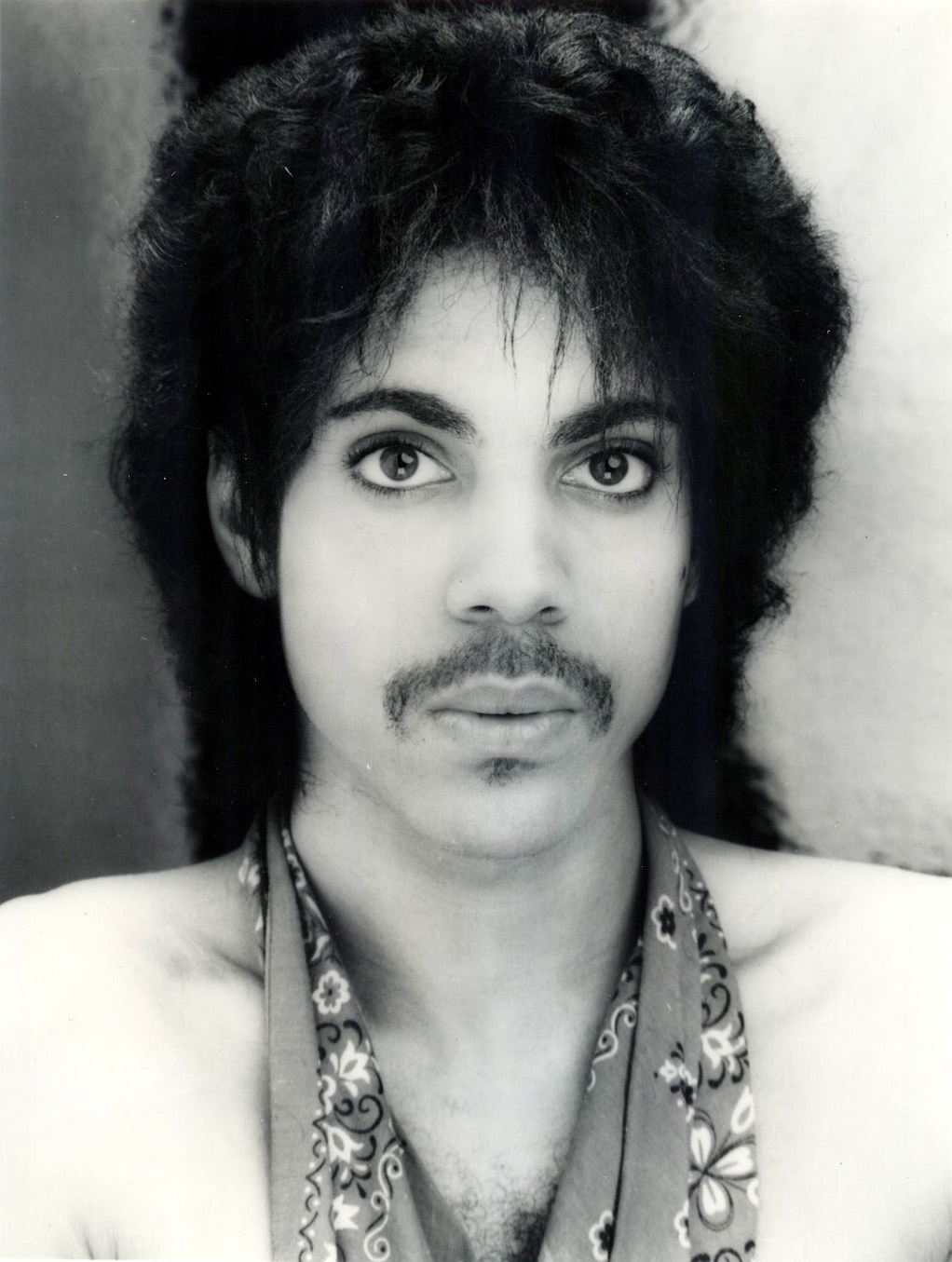
- Video albums: 17
- Music videos: 152

American singer and songwriter Prince was a highly prolific artist, having released several hundred songs both under his own name and under pseudonyms, as well as writing songs recorded by other artists. Estimates of the actual number of songs written by Prince (released and unreleased) range anywhere from five hundred to well over one thousand. Prince has sold over 150 million records worldwide, including 39.5 million certified units in the United States, 4.7 million in France and over ten million records in the United Kingdom. Throughout his career, Prince released a total of 17 video albums and 152 music videos.

== Music videos ==
Year	Song	Director(s)	Album
1979	"I Wanna Be Your Lover" (solo performance by Prince)	(Note: The director's name for this music video has not been found in reliable sources.)	Prince
1979	"I Wanna Be Your Lover" (performance by Prince with his band) (unreleased)	(Note: The director's name for this music video has not been found in reliable sources.)	Prince
1980	"Why You Wanna Treat Me So Bad?"	(Note: The director's name for this music video has not been found in reliable sources.)	Prince
1980	"Uptown"	(Note: The director's name for this music video has not been found in reliable sources.)	Dirty Mind
1980	"Dirty Mind"	(Note: The director's name for this music video has not been found in reliable sources.)	Dirty Mind
1981	"Controversy"	Bruce Gowers	Controversy
1981	"Sexuality"	Bruce Gowers	Controversy
1982	"1999"	Bruce Gowers	1999
1983	"Little Red Corvette"	Brian Greenberg	1999
1983	"Let's Pretend We're Married"	Bruce Gowers	1999
1983	"Automatic"	Bruce Gowers	1999
1984	"When Doves Cry" (edit)	Prince	Purple Rain
1984	"When Doves Cry" (complete version)	Prince	Purple Rain
1984	"Let's Go Crazy"	Albert Magnoli	Purple Rain
1984	"Purple Rain" (LP version)	Albert Magnoli	Purple Rain
1984	"I Would Die 4 U" (live version)	Paul Becher	Purple Rain
1984	"I Would Die 4 U" (live version in Washington, D.C.)	Paul Becher	Purple Rain
1984	"Baby I'm a Star" (live version)	Paul Becher	Purple Rain
1985	"Take Me with U" (live version)	Paul Becher	Purple Rain
1985	"4 the Tears in Your Eyes"		We Are the World
1985	"Raspberry Beret"	Prince	Around the World in a Day
1985	"Paisley Park"	Prince	Around the World in a Day
1985	"America"	Prince	Around the World in a Day
1986	"Kiss"	Rebecca Blake	Parade (soundtrack)
1986	"Mountains"	Prince	Parade (soundtrack)
1986	"Anotherloverholenyohead"	Daniel Kleinman	Parade (soundtrack)
1986	"Girls & Boys"	Prince	Parade (soundtrack)
1987	"Sign "☮" the Times"	Bill Konersman	Sign o' the Times
1987	"If I Was Your Girlfriend"	Prince/Albert Magnoli	Sign o' the Times
1987	"U Got the Look" (Duet with Sheena Easton)	Prince/Albert Magnoli	Sign o' the Times
1987	"I Could Never Take the Place of Your Man"	Prince/Albert Magnoli	Sign o' the Times
1988	"Alphabet St."	Prince	Lovesexy
1988	"Glam Slam"		Lovesexy
1988	"I Wish U Heaven"	Jean-Baptiste Mondino	Lovesexy
1989	"Batdance"	Albert Magnoli	Batman (soundtrack)
1989	"Batdance" (The Batmix)	Albert Magnoli	Batman (soundtrack)
1989	"Batdance" (Vicki Vale Mix)	Albert Magnoli	Batman (soundtrack)
1989	"Partyman" (edit)	Albert Magnoli	Batman (soundtrack)
1989	"Partyman" (12 inch mix)	Albert Magnoli	Batman (soundtrack)
1989	"Scandalous!"	Albert Magnoli	Batman (soundtrack)
1989	"Time Waits for No-One" (performed by Mavis Staples)	Prince	Time Waits for No One
1990	"Thieves in the Temple" (edit)	Prince	Graffiti Bridge
1990	"Thieves in the Temple" (extended version)	Prince	Graffiti Bridge
1990	"The Question of U" (live version)	Prince	Graffiti Bridge
1990	"Round and Round" (performed by Tevin Campbell)	Prince	Graffiti Bridge
1990	"New Power Generation"	Prince	Graffiti Bridge
1990	"New Power Generation" (Funky Weapon Remix)	Prince	Graffiti Bridge
1991	"Gett Off"	Randee St. Nicholas	Diamonds and Pearls
1991	"Gett Off" (Houstyle)	Randee St. Nicholas	Diamonds and Pearls
1991	"Violet the Organ Grinder"	Randee St. Nicholas	Diamonds and Pearls
1991	"Gangster Glam"	Paisley Park	Diamonds and Pearls
1991	"Clockin' the Jizz"	Randee St. Nicholas	Diamonds and Pearls
1991	"Cream" (edit)	Rebecca Blake	Diamonds and Pearls
1991	"Cream" (extended version)	Rebecca Blake	Diamonds and Pearls
1991	"Diamonds and Pearls"	Rebecca Blake	Diamonds and Pearls
1991	"Insatiable"	Randee St. Nicholas	Diamonds and Pearls
1992	"Willing and Able"	Larry Fong	Diamonds and Pearls
1992	"Willing and Able" (alternate version)	Larry Fong	Diamonds and Pearls
1992	"Strollin'"	Scott McCullough	Diamonds and Pearls
1992	"Money Don't Matter 2 Night"	Scott McCullough	Diamonds and Pearls
1992	"Money Don't Matter 2 Night"	Spike Lee	Diamonds and Pearls
1992	"Sexy MF"	Sotera Tschetter	Love Symbol
1992	"Call the Law"	Scott McCullough	Diamonds and Pearls
1992	"Thunder" (live version)		Diamonds and Pearls
1992	"Dr. Feelgood" (live version sung by Rosie Gaines)		Diamonds and Pearls
1992	"Jughead" (live version)		Diamonds and Pearls
1992	"Live 4 Love" (live version from Earls Court)		Diamonds and Pearls
1992	"My Name Is Prince"	Kevin Kerslake & Randee St. Nicholas	Love Symbol
1992	"2 Whom It May Concern"	Randee St. Nicholas	Love Symbol
1992	"7"	Sotera Tschetter	Love Symbol
1992	"Damn U"	Randee St. Nicholas	Love Symbol
1992	"The Morning Papers"	Randee St. Nicholas	Love Symbol
1992	"Love 2 the 9's"	Parris Patton	Love Symbol
1992	"The Continental" (edit)	Parris Patton	Love Symbol
1992	"The Max"	Parris Patton	Love Symbol
1992	"Blue Light"	Parris Patton	Love Symbol
1992	"The Sacrifice of Victor"	Parris Patton	Love Symbol
1992	"I Wanna Melt with U"	Paisley Park (pseudonym for Prince)	Love Symbol
1992	"Sweet Baby"	Parris Patton	Love Symbol
1992	"The Call"	Parris Patton	—N/a
1993	"Pink Cashmere"	James Hyman	The Hits/The B-Sides
1993	"Peach"	Parris Patton	The Hits/The B-Sides
1993	"Nothing Compares 2 U" (live video montage version)		The Hits/The B-Sides
1994	"The Most Beautiful Girl in the World"	Antoine Fuqua and Prince (as O(+>)	
1994	"Beautiful" (Junior Vasquez remix)	Prince (as O(+>)	
1994	"The Most Beautiful Girl in the World" (Mustang Mix)	Antoine Fuqua, Prince (as O(+>)	
1994	"Interactive"	Prince (as O(+>)	
1994	"Endorphinmachine"	Prince (as O(+>)	
1994	"Days of Wild"	Prince (as O(+>)	
1994	"Now"	Prince (as O(+>)	
1994	"Race"	Prince (as O(+>)	
1994	"Acknowledge Me"	Prince (as O(+>)	
1994	"Pheromone"	Prince (as O(+>)	
1994	"The Jam"	Prince (as O(+>)	
1994	"Shhh"	Prince (as O(+>)	
1994	"Loose!"	Prince (as O(+>)	
1994	"Papa"	Prince (as O(+>)	
1994	"Come"	Prince (as O(+>)	
1994	"Love Sign" (featuring Nona Gaye)	Ice Cube	
1994	"Letitgo"		
1994	"Dolphin"	Prince (as O(+>)	
1994	"When 2 R in Love"	David May	
1994	"18 & Over" (unreleased)	Prince (as O(+>)	
1994	"Empty Room" (unreleased)	Prince (as O(+>)	
1994	"Zannalee" (unreleased)	Prince (as O(+>)	
1995	"Purple Medley"	Joe Torcello (editor)/Various	
1995	"The Same December"	Prince (as O(+>)	
1995	"I Hate U"	Prince (as O(+>)	
1995	"Gold"	Prince (as O(+>)	
1995	"P Control"	Prince (as O(+>)	
1995	"Rock and Roll Is Alive (And It Lives in Minneapolis)"	Prince (as O(+>)	
1996	"Dinner with Delores"	Giorgio Scali	
1996	"I Like It There"	Prince (as O(+>)	
1996	"Betcha by Golly Wow!"	Prince (as O(+>)	
1997	"The Holy River" (edit)	Prince (as O(+>)	
1997	"Somebody's Somebody"	Prince (as O(+>)	
1997	"Face Down"	Azifwekare ("As if we care", pseudonym for Prince)	
1998	"Beautiful Strange"	Prince (as O(+>)	
1998	"The One"	Mayte Garcia	
1998	"Come On"	Prince (as O(+>)	
1999	"The Greatest Romance Ever Sold"	Malik Sayeed	
1999	"Hot Wit U" (Nasty Girl Remix)		
1999	"One Song"	Prince	
2001	"When I Lay My Hands on U"		
2001	"The Daisy Chain"		
2001	"U Make My Sun Shine" (Duet with Angie Stone)		
2004	"Musicology"	Sanaa Hamri	
2004	"Call My Name"	Sanaa Hamri	
2004	"Cinnamon Girl"	Phil Harder	
2004	"A Million Days"	Milos Twilight	
2005	"Te Amo Corazón"	Salma Hayek	
2006	"Black Sweat"	Sanaa Hamri	
2006	"Fury"	Sanaa Hamri	
2007	"Guitar"	Milos Twilight	
2007	"Chelsea Rodgers"	Phil Griffin	
2007	"Somewhere Here on Earth"	Phil Griffin	
2007	"The Song of the Heart"	George Miller	
2008	"The One U Wanna C"	Randee St. Nicholas	
2009	"Crimson and Clover"	P. R. Brown	
2009	"Chocolate Box" (featuring Q-Tip)	P. R. Brown	
2009	"Everytime" (performed by Bria Valente)		
2012	"Rock and Roll Love Affair"	Chris Robinson	
2013	"Screwdriver"	Prince	
2013	"Guitar" (Alternate)	Sanaa Hamri	
2013	"Fixurlifeup"	Sanaa Hamri	
2013	"Breakfast Can Wait"	Danielle Curiel	
2014	"Funknroll"		
2014	"Anotherlove"		
2015	"Marz"		
2015	"FallInLove2nite"		
2018	"Nothing Compares 2 U" (studio rehearsal footage)		
2018	"Mary Don't You Weep"	Salomon Ligthelm	
2019	"Manic Monday"	The Prince Estate	
2019	"Holly Rock"	Aaron Lampert	
2020	"Baltimore"	Ralston Smith	

== Video albums ==
Year	Album details	Peak chart positions										Certifications (sales thresholds)
Year	Album details	US	AUS	AUT	CAN	GER	NLD	NOR	SWE	SWI	UK	Certifications (sales thresholds)
1984	Purple Rain^{[A]}: Released: December 14, 1984; Label: Warner Home Video; Musical drama film	1	—	—	—	—	—	—	—	—	—	
1985	Prince and the Revolution: Live^{[A]}: Released: July 29, 1985; Label: Warner Home Video; Live concert	1	—	—	—	—	—	—	—	—	—	US: 2× Platinum
1986	Under the Cherry Moon^{[A]}: Released: July 2, 1986; Label: Warner Home Video; Musical drama film	—	—	—	—	—	—	—	—	—	—	
1987	Sign o' the Times: Released: November 20, 1987; Label: MCA Records; Concert film	10	—	—	—	—	—	—	—	—	—	US: Platinum
1989	Lovesexy Live 1: Released: April 19, 1989; Label: Warner Home Video; Live concert	—	—	—	—	—	—	—	—	—	—	
1989	Lovesexy Live 2: Released: April 19, 1989; Label: Warner Home Video; Live concert	—	—	—	—	—	—	—	—	—	—	
1990	Graffiti Bridge: Released: November 2, 1990; Label: Warner Home Video; Musical drama film	—	—	—	—	—	—	—	—	—	—	
1991	Gett Off − The Home Video Film^{[B]}: Released: September 10, 1991; Label: Warner Reprise Video; Video collection	6	—	—	—	—	—	—	—	—	—	US: Gold
1992	Sexy MF^{[B]}: Released: June 16, 1992; Label: Warner Home Video; Music video	—	—	—	—	—	—	—	—	—	—	
1992	Diamonds and Pearls Video Collection^{[B]}: Released: October 6, 1992; Label: Warner Home Video; Video collection	6	—	—	—	—	—	—	—	—	—	
1993	The Hits Collection: Released: September 14, 1993; Label: Warner Home Video; Video collection	10	—	—	—	—	—	—	—	—	—	US: Gold
1994	3 Chains o' Gold^{[B]}: Released: August 16, 1994; Label: Warner Home Video; Video collection	—	—	—	—	—	—	—	—	—	—	
1995	Live! − The Sacrifice of Victor: Released: March 6, 1995; Label: Warner Home Video; Live concert	—	—	—	—	—	—	—	—	—	—	
1995	The Undertaker: Released: March 6, 1995; Label: Warner Home Video; Live concert	—	—	—	—	—	—	—	—	—	—	
1999	Beautiful Strange: Released: August 24, 1999; Label: NPG Video; Music video and interview hosted by Mel B	—	—	—	—	—	—	—	—	—	—	
2000	Rave Un2 the Year 2000: Released: June 5, 2000; Label: NPG Video; Live concert	—	—	20	—	—	—	—	—	—	—	UK: Gold
2003	Live at the Aladdin Las Vegas: Released: August 12, 2003; Label: Hip-O Records; Live concert	2	—	—	—	—	—	—	—	—	—	

A With the Revolution
B With the New Power Generation

== Filmography ==
Year	Title	Director	Composer	Actor	Role	Notes
1984	Purple Rain	No	Yes	Yes	The Kid	Film Debut
1986	Under the Cherry Moon	Yes	Yes	Yes	Christopher Tracy	Prince's Directorial Debut
1987	Sign o' the Times	Yes	Yes	Yes	Himself	Concert movie
1990	Graffiti Bridge	Yes	Yes	Yes	The Kid	Purple Rain sequel Also writer
1994	3 Chains o' Gold	Yes	Yes	Yes	Himself	Direct-to-video film Also producer (credited as Paisley Park)
1996	Girl 6	No	Yes	No	—N/a	Film directed by Spike Lee

== Television ==
Year	Title	Role	Notes
February 21, 1981	Saturday Night Live	Himself	Musical Guest
September 24, 1989	Saturday Night Live	Himself	Musical Guest
February 4, 2006	Saturday Night Live	Himself	Musical Guest
1997	Muppets Tonight	Himself (as O(+>)	Episode 11
2014	New Girl	Himself	Episode: "Prince"
November 1, 2014	Saturday Night Live	Himself	Musical Guest
2020	Let's Go Crazy: Grammy Salute to Prince	Himself	Archive footage

== Video game ==
Year	Title	Role
1994	Prince Interactive	Himself (voice)

== See also ==
- Prince albums discography
- Prince singles discography

== Bibliography ==
- Uptown: The Vault – The Definitive Guide to the Musical World of Prince: Nilsen Publishing 2004, ISBN 916315482X.
