= Prince singles discography =

Singles recorded by American musician

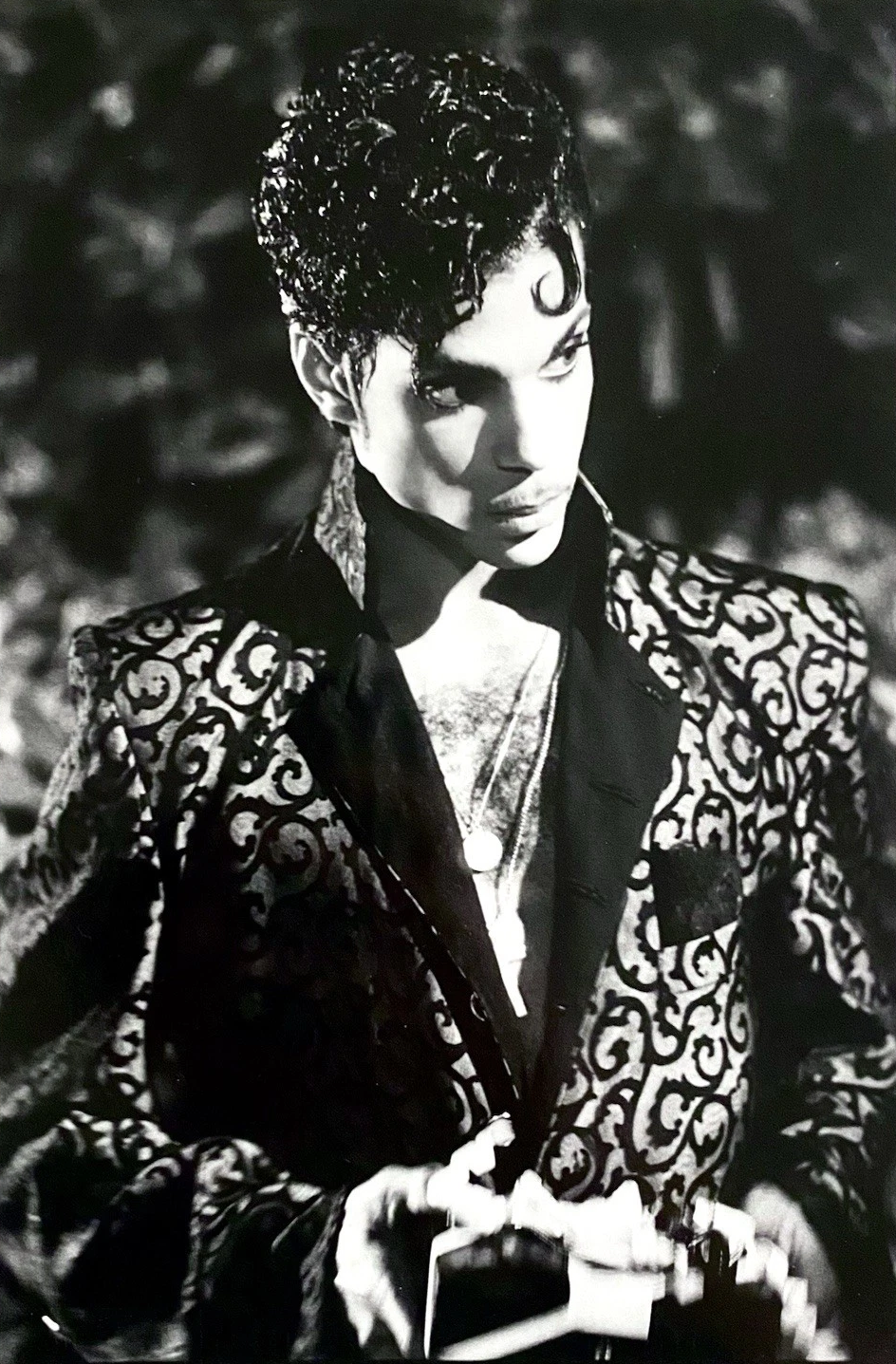
- Prince in 1986
- Singles: 117
- Promotional singles: 41
- Internet downloads: 23
- Airplay-only songs: 5
- Streams: 11
- Extended plays: 13

Prince released several hundred songs both under his own name and under pseudonyms and/or pen names, as well as writing songs which have been recorded by other artists. Estimates of the actual number of songs written by Prince (released and unreleased) range anywhere from 500 to well over 1,000. He released 117 singles, 41 promotional singles, 24 internet singles, and eight internet downloads.

== Overview ==
After signing a contract with Warner Bros. Records in 1977 at age 18, he released his debut album For You the following year. Prince's first entry on the Billboard Hot 100 was "Soft and Wet" (1978), which peaked at number 92. The following year, he released "I Wanna Be Your Lover", which became a top-40 hit in several countries and peaked at number 11 in the United States; it topped the Billboard R&B chart in early 1980. The album Prince spawned a top-20 R&B hit single ("Why You Wanna Treat Me So Bad?") and a top-five dance hit ("Sexy Dancer"). His next two albums, Dirty Mind (1980) and Controversy (1981), furthered his success on the dance/R&B charts, spawning the top-five hits "Dirty Mind", "Uptown", "Head", "Controversy", and "Let's Work". In 1982, Prince released the album 1999, which spawned the Billboard Hot 100 hits "1999", "Little Red Corvette", and "Delirious" throughout 1983, during which time he earned distinction as one of the first black artists to be played on MTV alongside Michael Jackson. Purple Rain (1984) gave Prince two American number one singles ("When Doves Cry" and "Let's Go Crazy") while the three other singles, "Purple Rain", "I Would Die 4 U", and "Take Me with U" became worldwide top-10 hits and established him as one of the most popular performers of the decade.

Throughout 1985 and 1986, Prince scored the worldwide top-40 hits "Raspberry Beret", "Pop Life", "Paisley Park", "America", "Girls & Boys", "Mountains", and "Anotherloverholenyohead", as well as the number-one hit "Kiss", from the musically diverse albums Around the World in a Day and Parade. His 1987 double-album Sign o' the Times garnered a Grammy nomination for Album of the Year and spawned the top-20 hits "Sign o' the Times", "If I Was Your Girlfriend", "I Could Never Take the Place of Your Man" and "U Got the Look". His success in Europe and Asia increased throughout the late-1980s with his 1988 album Lovesexy which crafted the top-40 hits "Alphabet St.", "Glam Slam", and "I Wish U Heaven". Prince closed the 1980s recording the soundtrack to the massively successful 1989 film Batman, which included the worldwide number-one hit "Batdance" as well as the top 20 hits "Partyman", "Scandalous!", "The Future" and "The Arms of Orion". By the end of the decade, he had amassed the most entries on the Hot 100 of any act in the previous 10 years, including six worldwide number-one singles.

Prince entered the 1990s with the soundtrack to Graffiti Bridge; the album spawned the top-10 hit "Thieves in the Temple" and the top-40 hit "New Power Generation". His 1991 album Diamonds and Pearls spawned several hit singles including the title track, the number-one hit "Cream", "Insatiable", "Money Don't Matter 2 Night", "Gett Off", and "Thunder". The 1992 follow-up record, the Love Symbol Album, scored several top-40 hits including "Sexy MF", "My Name is Prince", "7", "Damn U", and "The Morning Papers". Prince's first compilation album, The Hits/The B-Sides (1993) included the top-40 hits "Pink Cashmere" and "Peach", while his 1994 album Come scored the hits "Letitgo" and "Space". That same year, he released a duet with Nona Gaye, "Love Sign" taken from his compilation album 1-800-NEW-FUNK.

In 1994, he released "The Most Beautiful Girl in the World", the second most successful hit of his career after "When Doves Cry" 10 years earlier; the single reached the top 10 of 20 countries worldwide. The song's album in question, The Gold Experience, was released the following year and hit the top 40 with the singles "I Hate U" (Prince's last original single to reach the United States top 40), "Gold", and "Endorphinmachine" (in Japan), while the promotional single "Purple Medley", a remix of his greatest hits, reached the top 20 worldwide. After scoring the UK Top 40 hit "Dinner with Delores" in 1996, Prince released the triple CD set Emancipation which spawned the top-20 hits "Betcha by Golly, Wow", "The Holy River", and "Somebody's Somebody" throughout 1996 and 1997. A re-release of the hit song "1999" in 1998 brought Prince back to the pop charts. "The Greatest Romance Ever Sold", released in late 1999, became a moderate worldwide success as Prince's single releases became less frequent.

Prince has sold over 150 million records worldwide, including 48.9 million certified units in the United States, 4.7 million in France and over 5 million records in the United Kingdom, making him one of the best-selling artists of all time. He has accumulated five US number-one singles and fifteen worldwide number 1 hits, as well as 8 worldwide number one albums. He was the most successful artist on the Billboard charts from 1980 to 2000, scoring 8 number 1 R&B singles and 7 number 1 Dance singles (tied for second place for male entertainers with Enrique Iglesias and Michael Jackson). He has scored over 50 top 40 hits around the world since 1979. He has been ranked as the 21st most successful sales act of all time, the 26th most successful chart artist worldwide, including 27 overall number-one entries, and being the most successful chart act of the 1980s, as well as the 10th most successful chart act of the 1990s. Prince has scored at least one top-40 hit every year from 1979 until 1999.

His most commercial period was from 1982's 1999 to 1996's Emancipation, however, he has maintained a loyal audience since and experienced a commercial resurgence with 2004's Musicology. The title track and "Call My Name" reached top 40 positions. In 2006, several compositions including "Black Sweat", "Fury", and "Te Amo Corazon" reached the top 20 of charts throughout Europe and Asia. Art Official Age was released in September 2014 reaching all major Top 40 markets. Prince's penultimate album, Hit n Run Phase One, was released on CD and for download on September 14, 2015. His final album, Hit n Run Phase Two, was meant as a continuation of this, and was released on Tidal for streaming and download on December 12, 2015. After a series of warm-up shows at Paisley Park in late January 2016, Prince embarked on the Piano & A Microphone Tour, a tour that saw his show stripped back to only him and a custom piano on stage, commencing in Melbourne, Australia, on February 16, 2016, to critical acclaim prior to his death.

== Singles ==
=== 1970s–1980s ===
List of singles released in the 1970s and 1980s decades, showing selected chart positions, certifications, and album name
Title	Year	Peak chart positions										Certifications	Album
Title	Year	US	US R&B	AUS	CAN	FRA	GER	NZ	SWE	SWI	UK	Certifications	Album
"Soft and Wet"	1978	92	12	—	—	—	—	—	—	—	—		For You
"Just as Long as We're Together"	1978	—	91	—	—	—	—	—	—	—	—		For You
"I Wanna Be Your Lover"	1979	11	1	—	62	25	—	3	—	—	41	RIAA: Gold; BPI: Silver; RMNZ: Gold	Prince
"Why You Wanna Treat Me So Bad?"	1980	—	13	—	—	—	—	—	—	—	—		Prince
"Still Waiting"	1980	—	65	—	—	—	—	—	—	—	—		Prince
"Sexy Dancer" (UK and Japan only)	1980	—	—	—	—	—	—	—	—	—	— (Note: "Sexy Dancer" did not enter the official UK singles chart, but peaked at number 89 on the Record Business chart.)		Prince
"Bambi" (Netherlands and Belgium only)	1980	—	—	—	—	—	—	—	—	—	—		Prince
"Uptown"	1980	101	5	—	—	—	—	—	—	—	—		Dirty Mind
"Head" (Philippines only)	1980	—	—	—	—	—	—	—	—	—			Dirty Mind
"Dirty Mind"	1980	—	65	—	—	—	—	—	—	—			Dirty Mind
"Do It All Night" (UK only)	1981	—	—	—	—	—	—	—	—	—	—		Dirty Mind
"Gotta Stop (Messin' About)" (UK only)	1981	—	—	—	—	—	—	—	—	—	— (Note: "Gotta Stop (Messin' About)" did not enter the official UK singles chart, but peaked at number 130 on the Record Business chart.)		Non-album single
"Controversy"	1981	70	3	15	—	52	—	—	—	—	—		Controversy
"Let's Work"	1981	106	9	—	—	—	—	—	—	—	—		Controversy
"Sexuality" (Germany and Australia only)	1982	—	—	88	—	—	—	—	—	—	—		Controversy
"Do Me, Baby"	1982	—	— (Note: "Do Me, Baby" did not enter the Hot R&B/Hip-Hop Songs chart, but peaked at number 35 on the R&B/Hip-Hop Digital Song Sales component chart.)	—	—	—	—	—	—	—	—		Controversy
"1999"	1982	12	4	2	6	32	75	4	—	—	2^{[RI]}	BPI: Gold; RMNZ: Platinum	1999
"Little Red Corvette"	1983	6	15	8	5	94	—	12	—	—	2^{[RI]}	BPI: Silver; RMNZ: Gold	1999
"Delirious"	1983	8	18	—	27	—	—	33	—	—	—		1999
"Let's Pretend We're Married"	1983	52	55	—	—	—	—	—	—	—	—		1999
"Automatic" (Australia only)	1983	—	—	—	—	—	—	—	—	—	—		1999
"When Doves Cry"^{[A]}	1984	1	1	1	1	11	16	2	18	17	4	RIAA: Platinum; BPI: Platinum; RMNZ: Platinum	Purple Rain
"Let's Go Crazy"^{[A]}	1984	1	1	10	2	50	—	13	—	—	7	RIAA: Gold; BPI: Silver; RMNZ: Gold	Purple Rain
"Purple Rain"^{[A]}	1984	2	3	3	3	1	5	8	5	4	6	RIAA: Gold; ARIA: 4× Platinum; BPI: 2× Platinum; RMNZ: 4× Platinum	Purple Rain
"I Would Die 4 U"^{[A]}	1984	8	11	96	12	123	—	—	—	—	58		Purple Rain
"Take Me with U"^{[A]}	1985	25	40	—	—	—	—	—	—	—	7		Purple Rain
"Raspberry Beret"^{[A]}	1985	2	3	13	8	36	35	2	—	—	25	BPI: Platinum; RMNZ: 2× Platinum	Around the World in a Day
"Paisley Park"^{[A]} (Europe and Australia only)	1985	—	—	38	—	—	—	26	—	—	18		Around the World in a Day
"Pop Life"^{[A]}	1985	7	8	67	—	116	65	44	—	—	60		Around the World in a Day
"America"^{[A]}	1985	46	35	—	—	—	—	—	—	—	—		Around the World in a Day
"Kiss"^{[A]}	1986	1	1	2	4	2	4	2	10	3	6	RIAA: Gold; BPI: Platinum; BVMI: Gold; RMNZ: 2× Platinum	Parade: Music from the Motion Picture "Under the Cherry Moon"
"Mountains"^{[A]}	1986	23	15	45	—	—	32	37	—	—	45		Parade: Music from the Motion Picture "Under the Cherry Moon"
"Anotherloverholenyohead"^{[A]}	1986	63	18	—	—	—	—	36	—	—	36		Parade: Music from the Motion Picture "Under the Cherry Moon"
"Girls & Boys"^{[A]} (Europe only)	1986	—	—	—	—	27	27	—	—	—	11		Parade: Music from the Motion Picture "Under the Cherry Moon"
"Sign o' the Times"	1987	3	1	29	20	15	35	4	7	11	10		Sign o' the Times
"If I Was Your Girlfriend"	1987	67	12	—	—	188	—	48	—	15	20		Sign o' the Times
"U Got the Look"	1987	2	11	90	22	189	61	8	—	—	11		Sign o' the Times
"I Could Never Take the Place of Your Man"	1987	10	14	—	33	—	—	9	—	—	29		Sign o' the Times
"Alphabet St."	1988	8	3	20	14	47	18	1	1	5	9		Lovesexy
"Glam Slam"	1988	—	44	—	—	—	33	12	—	—	29		Lovesexy
"I Wish U Heaven"	1988	—	18	—	—	—	53	24	—	—	24		Lovesexy
"Batdance"	1989	1	1	2	1	5	10	1	1	1	2	RIAA: Platinum; ARIA: Gold; BPI: Silver	Batman: Motion Picture Soundtrack
"Partyman"	1989	18	5	38	31	—	32	16	—	25	14	RIAA: Gold	Batman: Motion Picture Soundtrack
"The Arms of Orion" (with Sheena Easton)	1989	36	—	108	—	—	—	44	—	—	27		Batman: Motion Picture Soundtrack
"Scandalous!" (limited release)	1989	—	5	95	—	—	—	—	—	—	—		Batman: Motion Picture Soundtrack
"—" denotes a single that was not released or did not chart in the region.

=== 1990s ===
List of singles released in the 1990s decade, showing selected chart positions, certifications, and album name
Title	Year	Peak chart positions										Certifications	Album
Title	Year	US	US R&B/HH	AUS	CAN	FRA	GER	NZ	SWE	SWI	UK	Certifications	Album
"The Future" (Europe only)	1990	—	—	—	—	—	39	—	—	15	—		Batman: Motion Picture Soundtrack
"Thieves in the Temple"	1990	6	1	16	5	—	21	5	4	12	7	RIAA: Gold	Graffiti Bridge
"New Power Generation"	1990	64	27	91	—	—	—	—	—	—	26		Graffiti Bridge
"Gett Off"^{[B]}	1991	21	6	8	25	97	13	13	13	3	4	RIAA: Gold	Diamonds and Pearls
"Cream"^{[B]}	1991	1	— (Note: "Cream" did not enter the Hot R&B/Hip-Hop Songs chart, but peaked at number 20 on the R&B Digital Song Sales chart.)	2	2	5	21	5	3	3	15	RIAA: Gold; ARIA: Platinum	Diamonds and Pearls
"Insatiable"^{[B]} (US only; limited release)	1991	77	3	—	—	—	—	—	—	—	—		Diamonds and Pearls
"Diamonds and Pearls"^{[B]}	1991	3	1	13	5	20	28	8	12	7	25		Diamonds and Pearls
"Money Don't Matter 2 Night"^{[B]}	1992	23	14	18	19	26	48	20	34	23	19		Diamonds and Pearls
"Thunder"^{[B]} (Europe only)	1992	—	—	—	—	—	—	—	—	—	28		Diamonds and Pearls
"Sexy MF"^{[B]}	1992	66	76	5	11	19	11	6	5	8	4		Love Symbol
"My Name Is Prince"^{[B]}	1992	36	25	7	5	29	19	9	15	14	7		Love Symbol
"7"^{[B]}	1992	7	61	25	3	—	77	12	—	28	27	RIAA: Gold	Love Symbol
"Damn U"^{[B]} (US only; limited release)	1992	108	32	—	—	—	—	—	—	—	—		Love Symbol
"The Morning Papers"^{[B]}	1993	44	68	87	8	—	—	—	—	31	52		Love Symbol
"Pink Cashmere"	1993	50	14	87	7	—	—	—	—	—	—		The Hits/The B-Sides
"Peach"	1993	—	—	28	—	35	45	15	39	13	14		The Hits/The B-Sides
"Controversy" (re-issue; UK only)	1993	—	—	—	—	—	—	—	—	—	5		The Hits/The B-Sides
"The Most Beautiful Girl in the World"	1994	3	2	1	6	5	9	1	13	1	1	RIAA: Gold; ARIA: Platinum; BPI: Silver; RMNZ: Gold	The Gold Experience
"Letitgo"	1994	31	10	22	20	46	45	24	7	21	30		Come
"Space" (limited release)	1994	—	71	91	—	—	—	—	—	—	—		Come
"Purple Medley" (limited release)	1995	84	74	40	—	—	—	—	—	—	33		Non-album single
"I Hate U"	1995	12	3	33	25	—	62	22	—	31	20		The Gold Experience
"Gold"	1995	88	92	94	39	—	58	—	19	—	10		The Gold Experience
"Dinner with Delores" (UK and Australia only)	1996	—	—	121	—	—	—	—	—	—	36		Chaos and Disorder
"Betcha by Golly Wow!"	1996	— (Note: "Betcha by Golly Wow!" did not enter the Billboard Hot 100, but peaked at number 23 the Mainstream Top 40 chart and number 31 on the Radio Songs component chart.)	— (Note: "Betcha by Golly Wow!" did not enter the Hot R&B/Hip-Hop Songs chart, but peaked at number ten on the R&B/Hip-Hop Airplay component chart.)	18	9	—	62	24	—	27	11		Emancipation
"The Holy River"	1997	— (Note: "The Holy River" did not enter the Billboard Hot 100, but peaked at number 19 the Mainstream Top 40 chart and number 58 on the Radio Songs component chart.)	—	138	31	—	92	—	—	—	19		Emancipation
"The Truth"	1997	—	—	—	—	—	—	—	—	—	—		The Truth
"1999" (re-issue)	1998	40	45	47	—	—	86	—	—	—	10		1999
"The Greatest Romance Ever Sold"	1999	63	23	—	—	—	79	—	—	—	65		Rave Un2 the Joy Fantastic
"1999" (1999 re-issue)	1999	— (Note: Prince's second re-issue of "1999" did not enter the Hot 100, but peaked at number 68 on the Hot 100 Singles Sales chart on January 29, 2000.)	—	—	—	—	—	—	—	—	40		1999
"—" denotes a single that was not released or did not chart in the region.

=== 2000s ===
List of singles released in the 2000s decade, showing selected chart positions and album name
Title	Year	Peak chart positions									Album
Title	Year	US	US R&B/HH	AUS	GER	IRE	NLD	NOR	SWI	UK	Album
"U Make My Sun Shine" (with Angie Stone)	2000	— (Note: "U Make My Sun Shine" did not enter the Billboard Hot 100, but peaked at number 59 on the Hot 100 Singles Sales chart.)	108	—	—	—	—	—	—	—	The Chocolate Invasion
"When Will We B Paid?" (with Audio Stepchild)	2000	—	108	—	—	—	—	—	—	—	Non-album single
"Supercute"	2001	—	—	—	—	—	—	—	—	—	The Chocolate Invasion
"The Work, pt. 1"	2001	—	—	—	—	—	—	—	—	—	The Rainbow Children
"Days of Wild" (2002 version)^{[B]}	2002	—	—	—	—	—	—	—	—	—	Non-album singles
"Controversy" (live in Hawaii)^{[B]}	2004	—	—	—	—	—	—	—	—	—	Non-album singles
"Musicology"	2004	120	44	29	—	—	32	19	27	—	Musicology
"Cinnamon Girl"	2004	—	—	—	89	—	34	—	—	43	Musicology
"S.S.T."	2005	111	— (Note: "S.S.T." did not enter the Hot R&B/Hip-Hop Songs chart, but peaked at number 22 on the Hot R&B/Hip-Hop Singles Sales component chart.)	—	—	—	—	—	—	—	Non-album single
"Te Amo Corazón"	2005	—	67	—	58	—	—	11	24	—	3121
"Black Sweat"	2006	60	82	—	80	41	29	—	52	43	3121
"Fury"	2006	—	—	—	—	47	72	—	92	60	3121
"Guitar"	2007	—	—	—	—	—	13	29	63	81	Planet Earth
"F.U.N.K."	2007	—	—	—	—	—	—	—	—	—	Non-album single
"Dance 4 Me"	2009	—	— (Note: "Dance 4 Me" did not enter the Hot R&B/Hip-Hop Songs chart, but peaked at number seven on the Hot R&B/Hip-Hop Singles Sales component chart.)	—	—	—	—	—	—	—	MPLSound
"—" denotes a single that was not released or did not chart in the region.

=== 2010s–2020s ===
List of singles released in the 2010s and 2020s decades, showing selected chart positions and album name
Title	Year	Peak chart positions					Album
Title	Year	US Adult R&B	US R&B	US R&B/HH Digital	US R&B/HH Sales	UK	Album
"Extraloveable" (featuring Andy Allo)^{[SV]}	2011	—	—	—	—	—	Hit n Run Phase Two
"Rock and Roll Love Affair"^{[SV]}	2012	— (Note: "Rock and Roll Love Affair" did not enter the Adult R&B Songs chart, but peaked at number 22 on the Adult Contemporary chart.)	—	—	7	121	Hit n Run Phase Two
"Screwdriver"^{[C]}^{[SV]}	2013	—	—	—	—	— (Note: "Screwdriver" did not enter the UK Singles Chart Top 100, but debuted and peaked at number 49 on the UK Independent Singles Chart.)	Hit n Run Phase Two
"Fixurlifeup"^{[C]}	2013	—	—	—	—	—	Plectrumelectrum
"Breakfast Can Wait"	2013	26	—	27	1	—	Art Official Age
"Pretzelbodylogic"^{[C]}	2014	—	—	—	—	90	Plectrumelectrum
"Fallinlove2nite" (featuring Zooey Deschanel)^{[SV]}	2014	29	—	—	—	113	Hit n Run Phase One
"Breakdown"	2014	—	— (Note: "Breakdown" did not enter the Hot R&B Songs chart, but peaked at number 19 on the R&B Digital Song Sales chart.)	49	—	—	Art Official Age
"Baltimore"^{[SV]}	2015	—	—	—	—	—	Hit n Run Phase Two
"Hardrocklover"	2015	—	—	—	—	—	Hit n Run Phase One
"This Could B Us"	2015	19	—	—	—	—	Hit n Run Phase One
"Free Urself"	2015	—	—	—	—	—	Non-album single
Posthumous
"Nothing Compares 2 U" (original studio version)	2018	—	21	—	—	—	Originals
"Mary Don't You Weep"	2018	—	—	—	—	—	Piano and a Microphone 1983
"Rock 'n' Roll Is Alive! (And It Lives in Minneapolis)"	2019	—	—	—	—	—	Non-album single
"Holly Rock"	2019	—	—	—	—	—	Originals
"I Feel for You" (acoustic demo)	2019	—	— (Note: "I Feel for You (Acoustic Demo)" did not enter the Hot R&B Songs chart, but peaked at number eight on the R&B Digital Song Sales chart.)	—	—	—	Non-album single
"Sign o' the Times" (limited edition 7" vinyl box set)	2020	—	—	—	—	—	Sign o' the Times Deluxe
"Welcome 2 America"	2021	—	—	—	—	—	Welcome 2 America
"Do Me, Baby" (demo)	2021	—	—	—	—	—	Non-album single
"Diamonds and Pearls" (live at Glam Slam)	2022	—	—	—	—	—	Diamonds and Pearls Deluxe
"All a Share Together Now"	2023	—	—	—	—	— (Note: "All a Share Together Now" did not enter the UK Singles Chart Top 100, but debuted and peaked at number 90 on the UK Singles Downloads Chart.)	Non-album singles
"7" (E flat version)	2023	—	—	—	—	—	Non-album singles
"Alice Through the Looking Glass"	2023	—	—	—	—	—	Diamonds and Pearls Deluxe
"Insatiable" (early mix – full version)	2023	—	—	—	—	—	Diamonds and Pearls Deluxe
"Get Blue"	2023	—	—	—	—	—	Diamonds and Pearls Deluxe
"Live 4 Love"	2023	—	—	—	—	—	Diamonds and Pearls Deluxe
"Daddy Pop" (12" mix)	2023	—	—	—	—	—	Diamonds and Pearls Deluxe
"Darkside"	2023	—	—	—	—	—	Diamonds and Pearls Deluxe
"United States of Division"	2024	—	—	—	—	—	Non-album singles
"Magnificent"	2024	—	—	—	—	—	Non-album singles
"Silver Tongue"	2024	—	—	—	—	—	Non-album singles
"With This Tear"	2026	—	—	—	—	—	Timeless
"Stone"	2026	—	—	—	—	—	Timeless
"—" denotes a single that was not released or did not chart in the region.

SV^{1} ^{2} ^{3} ^{4} ^{5} Single version differs from the album version.
RI^{1} ^{2} "1999" and "Little Red Corvette" originally reached #25 and #54 respectively upon their 1983 UK release. Their peak (#2) was as part of a double A-side reissue in early 1985.

== Promotional singles ==
List of promotional singles, showing selected chart positions and album name
Title	Year	Peak chart positions					Album
Title	Year	US	US R&B/HH	US Dance	NLD Tip	UK	Album
"When You Were Mine" (Note: "When You Were Mine" was also the B-side of the "Controversy" single.)	1980	—	—	—	—	—	Dirty Mind
"D.M.S.R."	1983	—	—	—	—	—	1999
"Another Lonely Christmas"	1984	— (Note: "Another Lonely Christmas" charted for one week at number 5 on Billboard's Christmas Singles chart.)	—	—	—	—	"I Would Die 4 U" single
"Erotic City"	1984	— (Note: "Erotic City" did not enter the Billboard Hot 100, but peaked at number 34 on the Digital Song Sales component chart.)	— (Note: "Erotic City" did not enter the Hot R&B/Hip-Hop Songs chart, but peaked at number 24 on the R&B/Hip-Hop Digital Song Sales component chart.)	1	—	—	"Let's Go Crazy" single
"Hot Thing" (Note: "Hot Thing" was also the B-side of the "I Could Never Take the Place of Your Man" single.)	1987	63	14	4	—	—	Sign o' the Times
"The Cross"	1987	—	—	—	—	—	Sign o' the Times
"Trust"	1989	—	—	—	—	—	Batman
"Willing and Able"	1992	—	—	—	—	—	Diamonds and Pearls
"Nothing Compares 2 U" (Note: "Nothing Compares 2 U" was also the B-side of the "Peach" single.)	1993	— (Note: "Nothing Compares 2 U" did not enter the Billboard Hot 100, but peaked at number seven on the Bubbling Under Hot 100 chart.)	62	—	—	—	The Hits/The B-Sides
"Pope"	1994	—	—	—	—	—	The Hits/The B-Sides
"Love Sign" (with Nona Gaye)	1994	— (Note: "Love Sign" did not enter the Billboard Hot 100, but peaked at number 72 on the Radio Songs component chart.)	— (Note: "Love Sign" did not enter the Hot R&B/Hip-Hop Songs chart but peaked at number 32 on the R&B/Hip-Hop Airplay component chart.)	—	—	—	1-800-NEW-FUNK
"Come"	1994	—	—	—	—	—	Come
"Pussy Control"	1995	—	—	—	—	—	The Gold Experience
"Dolphin"	1995	—	—	—	—	—	The Gold Experience
"Endorphinmachine"	1995	—	—	—	—	—	The Gold Experience
"Slave"	1996	—	—	—	—	—	Emancipation
"Somebody's Somebody" (Note: "Somebody's Somebody" was also the B-side of "The Holy River" single.)	1997	—	— (Note: "Somebody's Somebody" did not enter the Hot R&B/Hip-Hop Songs chart but peaked at number 15 on the R&B/Hip-Hop Airplay component chart.)	—	—	19	Emancipation
"Face Down"	1997	—	—	—	—	—	Emancipation
"I Can't Make U Love Me"	1997	—	—	—	—	—	Emancipation
"The One"^{[B]}	1998	—	— (Note: "The One" did not enter the Hot R&B/Hip-Hop Songs chart but peaked at number 44 on the R&B/Hip-Hop Airplay component chart.)	—	—	—	Newpower Soul
"Extraordinary"	1999	—	— (Note: "Extraordinary" did not enter the Hot R&B/Hip-Hop Songs chart but peaked at number 23 on the Adult R&B Airplay component chart.)	—	—	—	The Vault: Old Friends 4 Sale
"The Rest of My Life"	1999	—	—	—	—	—	The Vault: Old Friends 4 Sale
"5 Women"	1999	—	—	—	—	—	The Vault: Old Friends 4 Sale
"It's About That Walk"	1999	—	—	—	—	—	The Vault: Old Friends 4 Sale
"Baby Knows"	1999	—	—	—	—	—	Rave Un2 the Joy Fantastic
"Man'O'War"	2000	—	— (Note: "Man'O'War" peaked at number 22 on the Bubbling Under R&B/Hip-Hop Songs chart.)	—	—	—	Rave Un2 the Joy Fantastic
"She Loves Me 4 Me"	2001	—	— (Note: "She Loves Me 4 Me" did not enter the Hot R&B/Hip-Hop Songs chart but peaked at number 31 on the Adult R&B Airplay component chart.)	—	—	—	The Rainbow Children
"Last December"	2002	—	—	—	—	—	The Rainbow Children
One Nite Alone... Live EP	2002	—	—	—	—	—	One Nite Alone... Live!
Live at the Aladdin Las Vegas	2003	—	—	—	—	—	Live at the Aladdin Las Vegas DVD
"Call My Name"	2004	75	27	—	—	—	Musicology
"The Song of the Heart"	2006	—	—	—	—	—	Happy Feet
"Beautiful, Loved & Blessed" (with Támar Davis) (Note: "Beautiful, Loved & Blessed" was also the B-side of the "Black Sweat" single.)	2006	—	— (Note: "Beautiful, Loved & Blessed" did not enter the Hot R&B/Hip-Hop Songs chart but peaked at number 25 on the Adult R&B Airplay component chart.)	—	—	—	3121
"Chelsea Rodgers"	2007	—	—	—	—	—	Planet Earth
"Future Baby Mama"	2007	—	39	—	—	—	Planet Earth
"The One U Wanna C"	2007	—	—	—	14	—	Planet Earth
"U're Gonna C Me"	2009	—	—	—	—	—	MPLSound
"Clouds"	2014	—	— (Note: "Clouds" did not enter the Hot R&B/Hip-Hop Songs chart, but peaked at number 24 on the R&B Digital Song Sales chart.)	—	—	—	Art Official Age
"17 Days" (piano version)	2018	—	—	—	—	—	Piano and a Microphone 1983
"My Computer" (featuring Kate Bush)	2019	—	—	—	—	—	Emancipation
"Hot Summer"	2021	—	—	—	—	—	Welcome 2 America

== Other charted songs ==
This section includes songs that were not released as commercial or promotional singles, but charted in the US due to airplay by radio stations or digital song sales.

List of charting songs not released as singles or promotional singles
Title	Year	Peak chart positions						Album
Title	Year	US Digital	US R&B/HH	US R&B/HH Airplay	US R&B/HH Digital	US R&B Digital	US Rock	Album
"Shhh"	1995	—	—	62	—	—	—	The Gold Experience
"Satisfied"	2007	—	70	70	—	—	—	3121
"Better with Time"	2009	—	78	—	—	—	—	MPLSound
"Funknroll"	2014	—	—	—	46	23	—	Art Official Age
"1000 X's and O's"	2016	—	—	41	—	—	—	Hit n Run Phase One
Posthumous
"Adore"	2016	33	—	—	23	17	—	Sign o' the Times
"The Beautiful Ones"	2016	47	—	—	31	22	—	Purple Rain
"Darling Nikki"	2016	26	—	—	20	16	9	Purple Rain
"Baby I'm a Star"^{[A]}	2016	49	—	—	21	30	—	Purple Rain
"While My Guitar Gently Weeps" (live; with Tom Petty, Jeff Lynne, Steve Winwood, and Dhani Harrison)	2016	—	—	—	—	—	10	Rock and Roll Hall of Fame, Vol. 8: 2004–2005
"Purple Rain" (Piano and a Microphone 1983 version)	2018	—	—	—	—	6	—	Piano and a Microphone 1983

== Internet downloads ==
In this section all full songs are listed that have only been made available for download on the internet.

List of Internet download singles
Title	Year	Website
"One Song"	2000	Love4OneAnother.com
"Cybersingle"	2000	NPGOnlineLtd.com
"Bataclan"	2004	NPGMusicClub.com
"Glasscutter"	2005	NPGMusicClub.com
"Live from Paisley Park"	2005	NPGMusicClub.com
"Strange Relationship" (Live in Minneapolis)	2005	NPGMusicClub.com
"Guitar" (original "demo" version)	2007	3121.com
"Love" (acoustic version)	2007	3121.com
"Rock and Roll Love Affair" (Remix 7)	2013	3rdeyegirl.com
"Screwdriver" (Remix)^{[C]}	2013	3rdeyegirl.com
"Boyfriend" (Demo)^{[C]}	2013	3rdeyegirl.com
"That Girl Thang"^{[C]}	2013	3rdeyegirl.com
"Live Out Loud"^{[C]}	2013	3rdeyegirl.com
"Ain't Gonna Miss U When U're Gone" (featuring Ledisi)	2013	3rdeyegirl.com
"Extraloveable Reloaded"	2013	3rdeyegirl.com
"Menstrual Cycle"^{[C]}	2013	3rdeyegirl.com
"Octopus Heart"^{[C]}	2013	3rdeyegirl.com
"Groovy Potential"	2013	3rdeyegirl.com
"The Sweeter She Is"^{[C]}	2013	3rdeyegirl.com
"Something in the Water" (Paisley Park Rehearsal)^{[C]}	2013	3rdeyegirl.com
"Da Bourgeoisie"	2013	3rdeyegirl.com
"What If"^{[C]}	2015	Live Nation email download
"The X's Face"	2015	Live Nation email download

"Extraloveable Reloaded" and "Groovy Potential" were finally included on the album Hit n Run Phase Two (2015). "The X's Face" was later included on the album Hit n Run Phase One (2015).

== Streams ==
This section lists full songs that have only been made available to stream over the internet by Prince or a third-party affiliated to Prince, or to which Prince delivered a song for streaming purposes like music streaming services.

List of stream singles
Title	Year	Website/Streaming service
"U're Still the One"	1999	Love4OneAnother.com
"Xylophone"	2003	NPGMusicClub.com
"In a Large Room with No Light"	2009	Montreuxjazz.com
"Purple and Gold"	2010	Vikings.com
"Cause and Effect"	2010	89.3 The Current website
"Hot Summer"	2010	89.3 The Current website
"Rich Friends"	2010	KTU.com
"Same Page, Different Book"^{[C]}	2013	3rdeyegirl.com
"Stare"	2015	Spotify, Tidal
"Pretzelbodylogic Reloaded"	2015	Tidal
"If Eye Could Get Ur Attention"	2015	Tidal
"Black Muse" (edited version)	2016	Tidal
"Little Red Corvette" / "Dirty Mind" (live)	2016	Tidal
"Rock 'n' Roll Is Alive! (And It Lives in Minneapolis)"	2019	Spotify, Tidal

"Stare" was included on the album Hit n Run Phase Two (2015). "Hot Summer" was later released as a promotional single and included on the album Welcome 2 America (2021). "Rock 'n' Roll Is Alive! (And It Lives in Minneapolis)" was released as a single in April 2019 and was originally released as the B-side of the single "Gold" in 1995.

== Songs appearing on various artist compilations ==
Title	Year	Album
"4 the Tears in Your Eyes"	1985	We Are the World
"Good Love"	1988	Bright Lights, Big City soundtrack
"2045: Radical Man"	2000	Bamboozled soundtrack
"Purple House"	2004	Power of Soul: A Tribute to Jimi Hendrix
"The Song of the Heart"	2006	Happy Feet soundtrack
"A Case of U"	2007	A Tribute to Joni Mitchell

== Extended plays ==
List of extended plays, showing selected details and chart positions
Title	EP details	Peak chart positions							
Title	EP details	US	US R&B/ HH	AUS	AUT	GER	NZ	SWI	UK
The Scandalous Sex Suite EP (featuring Kim Basinger)	Released: December 1, 1989; Label: Warner Bros.	—	—	—	25	—	—	—	—
New Power Generation Remixes	Released: November 29, 1990; Label: Paisley Park, Warner Bros.	—	—	—	—	—	—	—	—
Gett Off Remix EP^{[B]}	Released: August 12, 1991; Label: Paisley Park, Warner Bros.	—	—	—	—	—	—	—	33
Cream Remixes^{[B]}	Released: November 4, 1991; Label: Paisley Park, Warner Bros.	—	—	—	—	—	—	—	—
My Name Is Prince Remixes^{[B]}	Released: October 22, 1992; Label: Paisley Park, Warner Bros.	—	—	—	—	—	—	—	51
7 Remixes^{[B]}	Released: December 3, 1992; Label: Paisley Park, Warner Bros.	—	—	—	—	—	—	—	—
The Beautiful Experience	Released: May 17, 1994; Label: NPG, Bellmark	92	29	14	16	29	47	4	18
Letitgo Remixes	Released: September 27, 1994; Label: Warner Bros.	—	—	—	—	—	—	—	—
Space Remixes	Released: November 1, 1994; Label: Warner Bros.	—	—	—	—	—	—	—	—
I Hate U Remixes	Released: September 19, 1995; Label: NPG, Warner Bros.	—	—	—	—	—	—	—	—
NYC	Released: 1997; Label: NPG	—	—	—	—	—	—	—	—
1999: The New Master^{[A]}^{[B]}	Released: February 2, 1999; Label: NPG	150	58	—	—	—	—	—	—
The Greatest Romance Ever Sold Remixes	Released: November 23, 1999; Label: NPG, Arista	—	—	163	—	—	—	—	—
The Breakfast Experience	Released: October 24, 2013; Label: NPG	—	—	—	—	—	—	—	—

== Notes ==
A With the Revolution
B With the New Power Generation
C With 3rd Eye Girl

== See also ==
- Prince albums discography
- Prince videography
