= Diamonds and Pearls Video Collection =

Video by Prince and The New Power Generation
- Released: October 6, 1992
- Recorded: 1991–1992
- Genres: R&B, pop, soul, funk, new jack swing
- Label: Warner Home Video
- Director: Various
- Producer: Prince

Prince chronology
Sexy M.F. (1992)	Diamonds and Pearls Video Collection (1992)	The Hits Collection (1993)

Diamonds and Pearls Video Collection is a collection of music videos compiled to accompany and further promote Prince's hit album Diamonds and Pearls. The collection was originally released in VHS format on October 6, 1992, and finally saw a DVD release on August 22, 2006 (the same release date as Prince's Ultimate collection). The collection contains videos for most of the songs on the album, with the exception of "Daddy Pop", "Walk, Don't Walk" and "Push". Two tracks included that were not on the album were "Call the Law", which was a B-side to the single release of "Money Don't Matter 2 Night" and "Dr. Feelgood", a cover version. Four of the clips were live concert performances: "Thunder", "Dr. Feelgood", "Jughead" and "Live 4 Love".

== Track listing ==
1. "Gett Off" (directed by Randee St. Nicholas)
2. "Cream" (directed by Rebecca Blake)
3. "Diamonds and Pearls" (directed by Rebecca Blake)
4. "Call the Law" (directed by Scott McCullough)
5. "Willing and Able" (directed by Sotera Tschetter)
6. "Insatiable" (directed by Randee St. Nicholas)
7. "Strollin'" (directed by Scott McCullough)
8. "Money Don't Matter 2 Night" (directed by Spike Lee, co-directed by Sotera Tschetter)
9. "Thunder" (live)
10. "Dr. Feelgood" (live)
11. "Jughead" (live)
12. "Live 4 Love" (live)
