= Diamonds and Pearls Tour =

1992 concert tour by Prince and the New Power Generation

- Tour by Prince and the New Power Generation
- Poster to the concert in Dublin, Ireland
- Location: Europe; Oceania; Asia
- Associated album: Diamonds and Pearls
- Start date: April 3, 1992
- End date: July 12, 1992
- Legs: 3
- No. of shows: 4 in Asia; 14 in Oceania; 32 in Europe; 50 in total (60 scheduled)

Prince and the New Power Generation concert chronology
- Nude Tour (1990); Diamonds and Pearls Tour (1992); Act I and II Tour (1993)

The Diamonds and Pearls Tour was a concert tour by American recording artist Prince and the New Power Generation promoting his Diamonds and Pearls album, released the previous year. The tour itinerary were scheduled dates in Asia, Europe, and for the first time, Australia. Like several of his then-recent tours, Prince chose not to tour the United States, the exception being the Lovesexy Tour in 1988. It would be 1993's Act I Tour before Prince did a full tour of the United States.

== History ==
More extravagant than the previous year's Nude Tour, the Diamonds and Pearls Tour had more expensive set design, and additional band members. The setlist focused mainly on songs from the album, but was spattered with a number of greatest hits. Most songs were played in their entirety. Prince added a new horn section to the band and promoted a new hip hop image with raps by Tony M. The concerts were preceded with footage and teases from his forthcoming album, indicating that videos had already been shot and ready to be released.

== Opening act ==
- Carmen Electra (select venues)
- The Naked Mazurs (select venues)
- Djaambi (select venues)

== Band ==
- Prince — vocals, piano, and guitar
- Levi Seacer Jr. — guitar and vocals
- Sonny T. — bass guitar and vocals
- Rosie Gaines — keyboards, organ, and vocals
- Tommy Barbarella — keyboards
- Michael Bland — drums, percussion
- Tony M. — dancing and lead raps
- Kirky J. and Damon Dickson — dance and vocals
- The NPG Hornz — brass
- Mayte, Diamond and Pearl — dancing

After the departure of the remaining members of The Revolution after 1990's Nude Tour, Prince decided to officially dub this new band the New Power Generation. Most of the band transferred over from the Nude Tour. Levi Seacer Jr. was switched from bass to guitar to replace the departed Miko Weaver while Sonny T. took over for Levi on bass. Tommy Barbarella was brought in as a replacement for Doctor Fink on keyboards.

Prince added a new horn section to the band, dubbed the NPG Hornz who, while not being active on the Diamonds and Pearls album, would contribute greatly to Prince's albums for several years.

Dancers Diamond, Lori Elle, and Pearl, Robia LaMorte, served as spokespersons for Prince during the tour while also performing in the album's videos while Mayte, then-newest member of the NPG Band was a troupe dancer who was being promoted for his next project that same summer of 1992.

== Set lists ==
Setlist of 24 April 1992, at the Entertainment Centre, Sydney, Australia

1. "Take My Hand, Precious Lord" (Introduction)
2. "Thunder"
3. "Daddy Pop"
4. "Diamonds and Pearls"
5. "Let's Go Crazy"
6. "Kiss"
7. "Jughead" (Includes "Dead on It" intro)
8. "Purple Rain"
9. "Live 4 Love"
10. "Willing and Able" (Includes "Lively Up Yourself" intro)
11. Interlude
12. "Nothing Compares 2 U"
13. "Sexy M.F."
14. "Thieves in the Temple" (Includes snippets of "It")
15. "A Night in Tunisia" / "Strollin'" (Instrumental)
16. "Insatiable"
17. "Gett Off" / "Gett Off (Houstyle)" (Includes snippets of "The Flow")

Encore I

18. "Cream" (Includes "La, La, La, He, He, Hee" interpolation)
19. "Chain of Fools" (Vocals by Rosie Gaines)

Encore II

20. "1999" / "Baby I'm a Star" / "Push" (Includes "A Love Bizarre", "My Name is Prince" and "Peter Gunn Theme" interpolations)

=== Additional notes ===
- On some dates, "Damn U" was performed in place of "Nothing Compares 2 U"
- Starting the UK Dates, "Delirious" was performed in place of Willing and Able on some dates, after the Stuttgart show it was performed for the remainder of the tour.
- On a few dates of the tour, "Bambi" was performed after "Live 4 Love" or in replacement of "Live 4 Love"

== Tour dates ==
List of 1992 concerts
Date	City	Country	Venue	Capacity
April 3, 1992	Tokyo	Japan	Tokyo Dome	96,324 / 96,324
April 4, 1992	Tokyo	Japan	Tokyo Dome	96,324 / 96,324
April 7, 1992	Nagoya	Japan	Rainbow Hall	10,543 / 10,543
April 9, 1992	Yokohama	Japan	Yokohama Arena	14,637 / 14,637
April 13, 1992	Brisbane	Australia	Brisbane Entertainment Centre	22,875 / 22,875
April 14, 1992	Brisbane	Australia	Brisbane Entertainment Centre	22,875 / 22,875
April 16, 1992	Melbourne	Australia	Flinders Park Tennis Centre	63,954 / 63,954
April 18, 1992	Melbourne	Australia	Flinders Park Tennis Centre	63,954 / 63,954
April 19, 1992	Melbourne	Australia	Flinders Park Tennis Centre	63,954 / 63,954
April 21, 1992	Melbourne	Australia	Flinders Park Tennis Centre	63,954 / 63,954
April 22, 1992	Melbourne	Australia	Flinders Park Tennis Centre	63,954 / 63,954
April 24, 1992	Sydney	Australia	Sydney Entertainment Centre	66,156 / 66,156
April 26, 1992	Sydney	Australia	Sydney Entertainment Centre	66,156 / 66,156
April 27, 1992	Sydney	Australia	Sydney Entertainment Centre	66,156 / 66,156
April 29, 1992	Sydney	Australia	Sydney Entertainment Centre	66,156 / 66,156
April 30, 1992	Sydney	Australia	Sydney Entertainment Centre	66,156 / 66,156
May 1, 1992	Sydney	Australia	Sydney Entertainment Centre	66,156 / 66,156
May 3, 1992	Sydney	Australia	Sydney Cricket Ground	39,894 / 48,042
May 25, 1992	Ghent	Belgium	Flanders Expo	11,000 / 11,000
May 27, 1992	Rotterdam	Netherlands	Rotterdam Ahoy	51,900 / 53,000 (Note: This box office score data is representative of all shows from May 27–28 & July 6–8)
May 28, 1992	Rotterdam	Netherlands	Rotterdam Ahoy	51,900 / 53,000
May 30, 1992	Dortmund	Germany	Westfalenhallen	13,689 / 13,689
May 31, 1992	Berlin	Germany	Waldbühne	22,100 / 22,100
June 2, 1992	Cologne	Germany	Sporthalle	7,648 / 7,648
June 3, 1992	Frankfurt	Germany	Festhalle Frankfurt	10,961 / 10,961
June 5, 1992	Munich	Germany	Olympiahalle	12,760 / 12,760
June 6, 1992	Munich	Germany	Olympiahalle	12,760 / 12,760
June 8, 1992	Kiel	Germany	Ostseehalle	10,232 / 10,232
June 9, 1992	Hamburg	Germany	Alsterdorfer Sporthalle	13,678 / 13,678
June 10, 1992	Hamburg	Germany	Alsterdorfer Sporthalle	13,678 / 13,678
June 13, 1992	Dublin	Ireland	Royal Dublin Showgrounds	27,698 / 27,698
June 15, 1992	London	England	Earls Court Exhibition Centre	133,144 / 133,144
June 16, 1992	London	England	Earls Court Exhibition Centre	133,144 / 133,144
June 17, 1992	London	England	Earls Court Exhibition Centre	133,144 / 133,144
June 19, 1992	London	England	Earls Court Exhibition Centre	133,144 / 133,144
June 20, 1992	London	England	Earls Court Exhibition Centre	133,144 / 133,144
June 21, 1992	London	England	Earls Court Exhibition Centre	133,144 / 133,144
June 23, 1992	London	England	Earls Court Exhibition Centre	133,144 / 133,144
June 24, 1992	London	England	Earls Court Exhibition Centre	133,144 / 133,144
June 26, 1992	Manchester	England	Maine Road	39,113 / 39,113
June 28, 1992	Glasgow	Scotland	Celtic Park	33,114 / 33,114
July 1, 1992	Stuttgart	Germany	Hanns-Martin-Schleyer-Halle	12,344 / 12,344
July 3, 1992	Trier	Germany	Moselstadion	16,988 / 16,988
July 4, 1992	Maastricht	Netherlands	MECC	17,543 / 17,543
July 6, 1992	Rotterdam	Netherlands	Rotterdam Ahoy	
July 7, 1992	Rotterdam	Netherlands	Rotterdam Ahoy	
July 8, 1992	Rotterdam	Netherlands	Rotterdam Ahoy	
July 10, 1992	Paris	France	Palais Omnisports de Paris-Bercy	47,767 / 47,767
July 11, 1992	Paris	France	Palais Omnisports de Paris-Bercy	47,767 / 47,767
July 12, 1992	Paris	France	Palais Omnisports de Paris-Bercy	47,767 / 47,767

=== Postponed and cancelled dates ===
Date	City	Country	Venue	Rescheduled/Cancelled	Reason
May 11, 1992	Hanover	Germany	Niedersachsenstadion	Cancelled	Originally rescheduled to 30 May 1992 but then cancelled
May 12, 1992	Berlin	Germany	Waldbühne	Rescheduled to 31 May 1992	Unknown
May 14, 1992	Stockholm	Sweden	Ericsson Globe Arena	Cancelled	Unknown
May 15, 1992	Stockholm	Sweden	Ericsson Globe Arena	Cancelled	Unknown
May 17, 1992	Gothenburg	Sweden	Scandinavium	Cancelled	Unknown
