= Diamond and Pearl (disambiguation) =

Diamond and Pearl refers to Pokémon Diamond and Pearl, the two Pokémon games released for the Nintendo DS in 2006.

Diamond(s) and Pearl(s) may also refer to:

== Pokémon franchise ==
- Pokémon the Series: Diamond and Pearl, the tenth season of the Pokémon anime
- Pokémon Brilliant Diamond and Shining Pearl, the 2021 remakes of Diamond and Pearl for the Nintendo Switch

== Literature ==
- The Diamond and the Pearl (1849), a novel by Catherine Gore
- Diamonds and Pearl (2016), a novel by K'wan Foye

== Music ==
- Diamonds and Pearls, an album by Prince
  - "Diamonds and Pearls" (song), a song from the album
- Diamonds and Pearls Video Collection, a video collection album
- "Diamonds and Pearls", a song by Monrose
- "Diamonds and Pearls", a song by Kansas

== See also ==
- Diamond (disambiguation)
- Pearl (disambiguation)
