= Peach (Prince song) =

1993 single by Prince

- UK CD single

Single by Prince

from the album The Hits/The B-Sides
- B-side: "Nothing Compares 2 U"
- Released: October 1993
- Recorded: June 1992
- Studio: Olympic (London, England)
- Genre: Rock
- Length: 3:48
- Label: Paisley Park; Warner Bros.
- Songwriter: Prince
- Producer: Prince

Prince singles chronology
"Pink Cashmere" (1993)	"Peach" (1993)	"Controversy" (1993)

"Peach" is a song by American musician Prince, released in October 1993 by Paisley Park Records and Warner Bros. Records from his 1993 compilations, The Hits 2 and The Hits/The B-Sides. He both wrote and produced the song, featuring a female gasp performed by American actress Kim Basinger. "Peach" peaked at number seven on the US Billboard Bubbling Under Hot 100 Singles chart; however, it did peak at number 14 in the United Kingdom. Its B-side, "Nothing Compares 2 U", charted at number 62 on the Billboard Hot R&B Singles chart. Prince performed the song live during his 1993 tour. It was the main sound theme of the Spanish-language talk show Corazón, Corazón in the mid 1990s. The accompanying music video was filmed inside and outside of Prince's residence, Paisley Park, and was included in The Hits Collection on home video.

== Release ==
The B-side is a live version of "Nothing Compares 2 U" in the US, while the UK backed the song with an edit of "My Name Is Prince". In addition, the UK issued two CD singles for "Peach", each backed by hits not on the collection. The first disc contains "Peach", "Mountains", "Partyman", and "Money Don't Matter 2 Night". The second disc contains "Peach", along with "I Wish U Heaven", "Girls & Boys", and "My Name Is Prince". The second disc was sold in a special fold-out collector's case with a placeholder for the first disc, which was sold separately.

== Critical reception ==
Larry Flick from Billboard magazine wrote, "He does one of his many personalities on this rockin' pop ditty, which will please fans of his steamy hit, 'Cream'. A live and aggressive drum beat kicks pop radio shape into a simple and instantly memorable melody. To go with this different mood is yet another timbre of the Paisley dude's unique voice." The Stud Brothers of Melody Maker viewed it as "a dire hybrid of Shakin' Stevens and Richie Sambora". Pan-European magazine Music & Media commented, "Attention, watch your teeth! This peach is as hard as a coconut, and Prince himself is disguised as wild child Iggy Pop." They added, "It's very different". Mike Soutar from Smash Hits gave "Peach" two out of five, saying, "It sounds like Prince, it's on a topic which Prince has explored more than adequately [...] and it's his favourite colour. It probably sounds just right on a Prince LP."

== Charts ==
=== Weekly charts ===
Weekly chart performance for "Peach"
Chart (1993–1994)	Peak position
Australia (ARIA)	28
Austria (Ö3 Austria Top 40)	25
Belgium (Ultratop 50 Flanders)	13
Europe (Eurochart Hot 100)	26
Europe (European Hit Radio)	9
Finland (Suomen virallinen lista)	14
France (SNEP)	35
Germany (GfK)	45
Iceland (Íslenski Listinn Topp 40)	9
Ireland (IRMA)	20
Netherlands (Dutch Top 40)	9
Netherlands (Single Top 100)	8
New Zealand (Recorded Music NZ)	15
Norway (VG-lista)	7
Portugal (AFP)	6
Sweden (Sverigetopplistan)	39
Switzerland (Schweizer Hitparade)	13
UK Singles (Official Charts)	14
UK Airplay (Music Week)	8

Weekly chart performance for "Nothing Compares 2 U"
Chart (1993)	Peak position
US Bubbling Under Hot 100 (Billboard)	7

=== Year-end charts ===
Year-end chart performance for "Peach"
Chart (1993)	Position
Netherlands (Dutch Top 40)	98
Netherlands (Single Top 100)	94
