= Pink Cashmere =

- US CD single

Single by Prince

from the album The Hits/The B-Sides
- B-side: "Soft and Wet" (US); "The Future" (Remix) (GER 7" and 12"); "Glam Slam" (GER 12" and CD); "Paisley Park" (GER CD)
- Released: August 31, 1993
- Recorded: June 10, 1988
- Studio: Paisley Park, Chanhassen
- Genre: Pop; R&B
- Length: 6:12 (album version); 3:56 (vocal version); 3:58 (guitar version)
- Label: Paisley Park/Warner Bros.
- Songwriter: Prince
- Producer: Prince

Prince singles chronology
"The Morning Papers" (1992)	"Pink Cashmere" (1993)	"Peach" (1993)

Music video
- "Pink Cashmere" on YouTube

"Pink Cashmere" is a song by American musician Prince, released as a single from his 1993 compilations, The Hits 1 and The Hits/The B-Sides. The song peaked at number 50 on the US Billboard Hot 100, number 14 on the Billboard R&B chart, number 30 on the Billboard Top 40 Mainstream, and number 10 on the Billboard Rhythmic Top 40.

In the US, the B-side was the 1978 track, "Soft and Wet", while Germany backed the song with the William Orbit remix of "The Future", originally issued as a single in 1990. In addition, Germany issued a 12" single and CD single for "Pink Cashmere". Both had the 1988 song "Glam Slam" as a B-side, and both contained two mixes of "Pink Cashmere", a vocal version and a guitar version. The 12" had "The Future" remix, but the CD replaced it with the 1985 song "Paisley Park".

== Critical reception ==
Larry Flick from Billboard magazine wrote, "Track is a complex puzzle of thrilling moments, starting with layers of falsetto crooning over a spare, midtempo beat. The arrangement blossoms with an infectious chorus that triggers a contrast of quasi-symphonic string passages and nimble, Hendrix-like guitar work." Troy J. Augusto from Cashbox named it Pick of the Week, describing it as "a smooth and mellow flight of James Brown-inspired slow burn." He noted that here, "Prince returns to familiar territory, thematically, crowing about lavishing the day's apple of his eye with all things worldly and luxurious. The question is: when can we see one of these strumpets, standing in purple rain, wearing only a raspberry beret and a pink cashmere? Better yet, when is this guy going to dust off his trusty guitar and rip it up?"

John Martinucci from the Gavin Report commented, "The former Prince will make you (pink!?) with envy as he lays down a cool groove that's crafted in the 'Purple Rain' style. The vocal version is an edit of the album version, and it's chock full of Orchestra-edged texture. Yo! MTV, how about an Unplugged". Another GR editor, Dave Sholin, stated, "The same haunting appeal of the title song from his hit movie is wrapped around this latest release." Alan Jones from Music Week named "Pink Cashmere" a "standout" from the collection, complimenting it as a "gorgeous" and "rolling falsetto vehicle."

== Personnel ==
Credits sourced from Benoît Clerc and Guitarcloud.

- Prince – lead and backing vocals, electric and acoustic guitars, synthesizers, bass guitar, Linn LM-1, Dynacord ADD-One
- Clare Fischer – string arrangements

== Charts ==
Weekly chart performance for "Pink Cashmere"
Chart (1993)	Peak position
Australia (ARIA)	87
Canada Retail Singles (The Record)	7
Iceland (Íslenski Listinn Topp 40)	33
Netherlands (Dutch Top 40 Tipparade)	9
Netherlands (Single Top 100 Tipparade)	11
US Billboard Hot 100	50
US Hot R&B Singles (Billboard)	14
US Top 40/Mainstream (Billboard)	30
US Top 40/Rhythm-Crossover (Billboard)	10
US Cash Box Top 100	33
