= The Song of the Heart (song) =

Promotional single by Prince

from the album Happy Feet: Music from the Motion Picture
- Released: 2006
- Recorded: 2006
- Genre: Jazz; funk; rock
- Length: 4:36
- Label: Atlantic
- Songwriter: Prince
- Producer: Prince

"The Song of the Heart" is a song written and performed by Prince for the 2006 film Happy Feet.

The song came about when Prince was approached to allow his song "Kiss" to appear in the film. Prince was initially hesitant to sign off on its use, but agreed to watch the film before he made a final decision. Executives from Warner Bros. screened Happy Feet for Prince at his Paisley Park recording complex, and he enjoyed the film so much that he agreed to the use of "Kiss" and offered to write a new song for the film. Warner Bros. executive Darren Higman said that Prince completed "The Song of the Heart" approximately one week after he was screened the film. It is the only song on the soundtrack specifically written for the film.

The same rap and musical material used for the track was integrated from an unreleased, non-album track titled, "Prince And The Band", and use as the direct foundation for the song.

"Prince And The Band" was officially released via 2026's Calabama EP, which was released due to the Timeless overdubbing controversy.

== Music video ==
A music video was produced to promote the release. The video was directed by George Miller (who also directed the Happy Feet film).

== Awards ==
Year	Nominee / work	Award	Result
2007	Golden Globe Award	Best Original Song	Won
2008	Grammy Award	Best Song Written for Visual Media	Nominated
