= Thunder (Prince song) =

1992 single by Prince and the New Power Generation

- UK 12-inch picture disc

Single by Prince and the New Power Generation

from the album Diamonds and Pearls
- B-side: "Violet the Organ Grinder"; "Gett Off" (Thrust Dub)
- Released: June 15, 1992
- Recorded: January 26, 1991 (tracking); April 22, 1991 (overdubs)
- Studio: Paisley Park (Chanhassen, Minnesota)
- Genre: New jack swing; gospel; funk
- Length: 5:45 (album version); 3:20 (radio edit)
- Label: Paisley Park; Warner Bros.
- Songwriter: Prince
- Producer: Prince

Prince and the New Power Generation singles chronology
"Money Don't Matter 2 Night" (1992)	"Thunder" (1992)	"Sexy MF" (1992)

"Thunder" is a song by American musician Prince and the New Power Generation, from their 1991 album Diamonds and Pearls. It was both written and produced by Prince and issued by Paisley Park and Warner Bros. as a limited, individually numbered 12-inch single picture disc in the UK and Ireland only, and the edited version was available only on the promotional single.

== Background ==
The lyrics can be interpreted as referring to the night Prince decided to withdraw The Black Album, when he was rumored to have suffered a bad ecstasy trip. This is the first single cover to feature Mayte, sitting at the lower left. The B-sides were previously released on the "Gett Off" maxi-single: "Violet the Organ Grinder" and "Gett Off" (Thrust Dub).

== Critical reception ==
In a retrospective review, Patrick Corcoran from Albumism wrote that the song "rumbles into earshot on a wave of multilayered vocals and typically sterling guitar and sitar work." He added, "As some would have it, this was his account of the night he shelved the Black Album at the last moment—a battle for his very soul no less." Mike Diver for the BBC said in his 2010 review, that it is an "anthemic opener" that "apparently refers, in its lyrics, to withdrawn 1987 LP The Black Album". Gavin Martin from NME described the song as "hysterical pop operatics". Jeff Weiss from Pitchfork commented that it "stitches evangelic lyrics to sub-continental sitars, slashing guitars, and chord progressions that Max Martin has swiped for the last two decades. It's basically a proto-Backstreet Boys anthem for born-agains." A reviewer from People Magazine noted the "pretentious bluster" of the song. Tom Doyle from Smash Hits described it as "quirky rock".

== Chart performance ==
The song was another top-30 hit for Prince, peaking at number 28 in the UK, and continuing the moderate success of Diamonds and Pearls singles there. In Ireland, "Thunder" reached number three and charted for 12 weeks.

== Personnel ==
Personnel are adapted from Benoît Clerc and Guitarcloud

- Prince – lead and backing vocals, electric guitars, synthesizers, bass guitar, Roland R-8, Linn LM-1, finger cymbals

== Charts ==
Weekly chart performance for "Thunder"
Chart (1992)	Peak position
Europe (Eurochart Hot 100)	86
Ireland (IRMA)	3
UK Singles (Official Charts)	28
UK Airplay (Music Week)	7
UK Dance (Music Week)	6
