= Sotera Tschetter =

Sotera Tschetter is an American designer, art director, music video director and producer, best known for her work with American musician Prince.

== Early career ==
A South Dakota native, Tschetter relocated to the Twin Cities to earn her degree in Applied Design Visual Communication from the University of Minnesota. Upon graduating in 1988, she ventured to the West Coast to intern with a design company. Eventually, this job brought her back to the Twin Cities to work on the movie Graffiti Bridge.

== Work with Prince ==
It was around this time that Prince took notice of her work ethic and asked her to help out with Glam Slam, the nightclub he was building. Their creative collaboration grew exponentially from there. Prince created a position as Creative Director for her, his first independent agency in charge of all things visual. Tschetter set up a creative center that was fully dedicated to all that was Prince. Her job duties included art design and direction of photo shoots, music video themes, sets, direction, tour stages, live performances and album covers. The first set she built was for the music video "Gett Off". Additional duties included interior design for his homes, nightclubs, Paisley Park, instrument design, furniture design, artwork purchasing and personal shopping. Later her duties expanded to the design and direction of the music videos, "7", "Sexy MF", "Willing and Able", a full concert live performance at Glam Slam, "Money Don't Matter 2 Night", "The Continental", "Daddy Pop" and "Sweet Baby".

=== Love Symbol ===
Probably her most notable achievement was being responsible for the creation of the "Love Symbol". Additional collaborators included her assistant Liz Luce and Paintbox designer Mitch Monson. Prince decided to use the symbol as the unpronounceable name for his next record, which is often referred to as the Love Symbol Album (1992). The Love Symbol was eventually incorporated into every facet of Prince’s music videos, concert staging, album artwork, guitars, wardrobe and merchandising. In 1993 Prince changed his name to the symbol and until 2000, he was referred to as "The Artist Formerly Known as Prince" or simply "The Artist". On May 16, 2000, Prince stopped using the Love Symbol as his name and returned to using "Prince", but the Symbol remained an integral part of his persona and body of work.

== Music video filmography ==
Year	Artist	Title	Position	Notes
1991	Prince	"Gett Off"	Art Director	
1991	Prince	"Gett Off (Houstyle)"	Art Director	
1991	Prince	"Violet The Organ Grinder"	Art Director	
1991	Prince	"Gangster Glam"	Art Director	
1991	Prince	"Clockin' The Jizz"	Art Director	
1992	Prince	Willing And Able	Director	
1992	Prince	"Money Don't Matter 2 Night"	Director	Version without Prince directed by Spike Lee. Version including Prince performance segments co-directed by Sotera Tschetter.
1992	Prince	"Daddy Pop"	Director	
1992	Prince	"Sexy MF"	Director	
1992	Prince	"Sweet Baby"	Director	
1992	Prince	"The Continental"	Director	
1992	Prince	"7"	Director	Nominated: MTV Video Music Award for Best R&B Video (1993)
1993	Mavis Staples	"The Voice"	Director	
