= Days of Wild =

- NPG CD single

Single by Prince
- B-side: "1+1+1=3"
- Released: June 30, 2002
- Recorded: Montreal, June 18, 2002
- Genre: Funk
- Length: 4:08 (single edit); 10:45 (concert mix)
- Label: NPG
- Songwriter: Prince
- Producer: Prince

Prince singles chronology
"The Work, pt. 1" (2001)	"Days of Wild" (2002)	"Controversy (Live in Hawaii)" (2004)

"Days of Wild" is a song by Prince and The New Power Generation, first commercially released in 1998 on the triple-album Crystal Ball and then later as a digital single in 2002. It was written by Prince in early 1994 after his name change to an unpronounceable symbol. The song is regarded as one of Prince's first legitimate successes at rapping and is both an ode to and criticism of gangsta rap. Strong language and cursing is used throughout the track, but it ultimately elevates women with lyrics such as "A woman everyday should be thanked, not disrespected, not raped or spanked". "Days of Wild" is pure funk, relying heavily on bass guitar as well as the organ and samplers to create an infectious groove. The song contains an interpolation of Duke Ellington's 'Caravan'.

"Days of Wild" was premiered live in concert in February 1994 along with other new material to promote Prince's new on-stage persona, performing all new material. Shortly thereafter, the studio version of this song and others were played as a promotion on European radio stations and began circulating among collectors. "Days of Wild" became a crowd favorite at concerts, despite it never being officially released. The song was originally to be released on 1995's The Gold Experience but ended up being pulled for unknown reasons. Comments by Prince and associates suggest that he may have simply been dissatisfied with the studio version, which pales in comparison to live performances.

A live performance of the song (an edited version of a performance from August 5, 1995) was eventually broadcast on a VH1 special segment of Prince videos in 1996. It was also played at Paisley Park on December 9, 1995, and after some overdubbing, this particular version was eventually released on the 1998 Crystal Ball 3-CD set.

Some time after this point, contemporaneous with his first separation and termination of marriage, one of Prince's (musical) mentors and his (then) ‘spiritual guide,’Larry Graham, influenced him to eliminate cursing from his music and change the lyrics of older songs to fit with his new, public, practicing morality.

By 1998, Prince had revised the lyrics of "Days of Wild" in concert to eliminate the profanity. During the 2000 "Celebration" concert at the University of Minnesota, Prince even scolded the audience ("We don't do that no more!") when it began the "play that motherfuckin' bass!" chant associated with concert performances of the song.

The B-side to the single is a live version of "1+1+1 is 3", a track from The Rainbow Children that was performed on the same tour and included on the live box set, One Nite Alone... Live!. An edit of "Days of Wild" was also included on the single. "1+1+1 is 3" is a funk number and a metaphor for God, man and wife as a union. The single was made publicly available to download initially, then with purchase of Celebration 2002 NPG member tickets/passes via CD at the end of the weeklong event, as complimentary to certain guests, among secondhand sales online, in the NPG and Paisley Park Official online/retail outlets, and during concerts.
