= New Power Generation =

American rhythm and blues band

- Origin: Minneapolis, Minnesota, United States
- Genres: Pop; rock; funk; R&B; soul; hip hop; dance; psychedelia
- Years active: 1990–2013; 2015; 2017; 2019
- Members: Morris Hayes; Tommy Barbarella; Damon Dickson; Levi Seacer, Jr. Tony M. Michael Bland; Kirk Johnson; Sonny T. Andy Allo
- Past members: Chance Howard; Liv Warfield; Josh Dunham; John Blackwell; Cora Coleman Dunham; Rosie Gaines; Elisa Fiorillo; Mayte Garcia; Rhonda Smith; Kat Dyson; Mike Scott; Renato Neto; Frederic Yonnet; Shelby J. Ida Nielsen; Donna Grantis; Cassandra O'Neal; Prince; Andrew Gouche

The New Power Generation, also known as the NPG, was the backing band of musician Prince from 1990 to 2013. They were replaced by 3rdeyegirl as his backing band in 2013. In 2015, the New Power Generation reunited as Prince's backing band for his final studio album before his death, Hit n Run Phase Two. They reunited once again in 2017 for a US and European tour. In February 2026, the band changed its name to "the Minneapolis Sound All Star Band".

== History ==
The phrase "Welcome to the New Power Generation" was mentioned on the opening track of 1988's Lovesexy. New Power Generation was used for the first time as a band name in the 1990 film Graffiti Bridge, and a song entitled "New Power Generation" appeared on the accompanying soundtrack album.

The New Power Generation debuted live during the Nude Tour in 1990 and on record on the 1991 album Diamonds and Pearls. The band consisted of holdovers from the Nude Tour: Michael Bland (drums), Levi Seacer, Jr. (guitar), Rosie Gaines (keyboards and backing vocals), Tony M. (lead raps and dancing), Kirk Johnson (percussion and dancing), and Damon Dickson (dancing), along with two new members Tommy Barbarella (keyboards) and Sonny T. (bass). Rosie Gaines left the band after the Diamonds and Pearls Tour and was replaced by keyboardist Morris Hayes.

When Prince began his formal dispute with Warner Bros. and changed his stage name to an unpronounceable symbol in 1993, the NPG became a side-project for Prince, allowing him to release music outside of his contract.

The NPG's debut album, Goldnigga, featured Tony M. as lead vocalist/rapper. The album relied heavily on rap, while the music itself was reminiscent of the 1970s funk. Prince participated heavily in writing and performing the music, while Tony wrote and performed raps. Prince provided co-lead vocals on two songs, "Black M.F. in the House" and "Johnny", and the two were often performed by him in his own concerts and after shows.

A reduced NPG returned to the Prince fold when he began performing under the symbolic moniker in early 1994, backing him on The Gold Experience. The rappers and dancers were let go, and Levi Seacer left the band as well. Given an expanded role in the band was dancer Mayte Garcia who provided backing and Spanish vocals. This incarnation released Exodus in 1995. Prince again took a role behind the scenes, adopting the guise of the masked "Tora Tora" and performing lead vocals on several tracks, sometimes with an altered voice. His participation in this version of the NPG was much more apparent. Although several raps were recorded for the album, they were left out of the final release, and the focus was more on funk.

In 1996, longstanding members Michael Bland, Tommy Barbarella, and Sonny T. were fired and a new band was formed for touring. Guitarists Kat Dyson (formerly of Tchukon) and Mike Scott, along with bassist Rhonda Smith joined Morris Hayes and Kirk Johnson, who re-joined the band to play drums.

In 1998, another NPG album was released titled Newpower Soul (modifying a song title from Exodus). In fact, a spoken outtake from Exodus mentions the upcoming album, indicating its planning stages. Prince features prominently on the cover and liner notes and provides lead vocals on all songs. Unlike the two previous releases, the album relies heavily on drum programming by Kirk Johnson and features input from Larry Graham and Doug E. Fresh.

A fourth album, Peace, due to be released in 2001, never materialized and although a few songs have been made public through limited-release singles at concerts ("Peace" / "2045: Radical Man" and "The Daisy Chain" / "Gamillah") and through Prince's former official website, NPG Music Club. The songs were later included on the Prince albums The Slaughterhouse and The Chocolate Invasion.

The band since has been a "revolving door" of musicians, who usually stay for a couple years before being replaced. It is often nebulous as to who is actually an 'official' member.

In 2010, three former members of the original New Power Generation, drummer Michael Bland, keyboardist Tommy Barbarella and bass player Sonny T., became members of Nick Jonas and the Administration (a side project of Nick Jonas of the Jonas Brothers).

In 2013, NPG singer Elisa Fiorillo (Dease) formed a duo with Nashville-based guitarist Tyler Reese, called the Dease & Reese Project, and in 2014 released the album Life in 20 (REMU Records). Fiorillo continued to perform with Prince.

The NPG collaborated with Prince once more in 2015 on what would be his last studio album, Hit n Run Phase Two.

After Prince's untimely death in 2016, the band reunited in 2017 and 2019 for a US and European Prince tribute tour.

In February 2026, it was officially announced that the band was changing its name to "the Minneapolis Sound All Star Band". The switch is happening because NPG’s ability to use the trademarked name has expired and Global Music Rights, the performing rights organization that handles administration of Prince’s songs, no longer permits tribute acts to perform sets of his material (though NPG considers itself a “legacy group”).

== Discography ==
=== Studio albums ===
Year	Album	Peak chart positions		Certifications	Additional information
Year	Album	US	UK	Certifications	Additional information
1991	Diamonds and Pearls (Note: Released under Prince and the New Power Generation.)	3	2	BPI: 2× Platinum	—
1992	Love Symbol Album	5	1	—	—
1993	Gold Nigga	—	—	—	Tony M. performs lead vocals.
1995	Exodus	—	11	—	Sonny T. performs lead vocals.
1998	Newpower Soul	22	38	—	Prince performs lead vocals. Prince's symbol (stylized) and portrait is on the front cover.
2007	Planet Earth (Note: Credited as Prince.)	3	—	—	—
"—" denotes releases that did not chart.

=== Live albums ===
- One Nite Alone... Live! (2002)
- C-Note (2004)

=== Albums credited to the NPG Orchestra ===
Year	Album details
1997	Kamasutra: Released: February 14, 1997 (limited edition cassette); Label: NPG

=== Albums with contributions by the New Power Generation ===
Year	Album	Peak chart positions		Additional information
Year	Album	US	UK	Additional information
1990	Graffiti Bridge	6	1	Unnamed New Power Generation members provided backing vocals on the song "New Power Generation".
1994	Blankman	—	—	Includes "Super Hero", credited to the New Power Generation and the Steeles.
1995	The Gold Experience	—	—	Produced, arranged, composed and performed by Prince with the New Power Generation.
1996	Girl 6	75	—	Includes "Count the Days", from Exodus and title track is credited to the New Power Generation, with Prince on lead vox.
2004	The Chocolate Invasion	—	—	The New Power Generation is credited for the track "Gamillah".
2004	The Slaughterhouse	—	—	The New Power Generation is credited for the tracks "Peace", "2045: Radical Man", and "The Daisy Chain".
2006	3121	1	9	The New Power Generation is credited for "shouts" on the song "Lolita".

=== Singles credited to Prince and the New Power Generation ===
Year	Title	Peak chart positions				Album
Year	Title	US	US R&B	US Dance	UK	Album
1991	"Gett Off"	21	6	1	4	Diamonds and Pearls
1991	"Cream"	1	—	—	15	Diamonds and Pearls
1991	"Diamonds and Pearls"	3	1	—	25	Diamonds and Pearls
1992	"Money Don't Matter 2 Night"	23	14	—	19	Diamonds and Pearls
1992	"Insatiable"	77	3	—	—	Diamonds and Pearls
1992	"Thunder"	—	—	—	28	Diamonds and Pearls
1992	"Sexy MF"/"Strollin'"	66	76	—	4	Love Symbol Album/Diamonds and Pearls
1992	"My Name Is Prince"	36	25	9	7	Love Symbol Album
1992	"My Name Is Prince" (remixes)	—	—	—	51	N/A
1992	"7"	7	61	—	27	Love Symbol Album
1992	"The Morning Papers"	44	68	—	52	Love Symbol Album
1992	"Damn U"	—	32	—	—	Love Symbol Album
1993	"Nothing Compares 2 U"	—	62	—	—	The Hits/The B-Sides; B-side to "Peach"
2002	"Days of Wild"	—	—	—	—	N/A
2004	"Controversy (Live in Hawaii)"	—	—	—	—	N/A
"—" denotes releases that did not chart.

== Singles credited to the New Power Generation ==
Year	Title	Peak chart positions			Album
Year	Title	US R&B	AUS	UK	Album
1993	"2gether"	—	—	—	Gold Nigga
1994	"Get Wild"	—	—	19	Exodus
1994	"Count the Days"	—	—	—	Exodus
1994	"Super Hero" featuring the Steeles	—	—	—	Blankman: Music from the Motion Picture
1995	"The Good Life"	—	32	29	Exodus
1996	"Girl 6"	78	—	—	Girl 6
1997	"The Good Life" (re-issue)	—	—	15	Exodus
1998	"The War"	—	—	—	N/A
1998	"The One"	44	—	—	Newpower Soul
1998	"Come On"	—	—	65	Newpower Soul
2001	"Peace"/"2045: Radical Man"	—	—	—	The Slaughterhouse
2001	"The Daisy Chain"/"Gamillah"	—	—	—	The Slaughterhouse/The Chocolate Invasion
"—" denotes releases that did not chart.

=== Singles with contributions by the New Power Generation ===
Year	Title	Peak chart positions			Album	Additional information
Year	Title	US	US R&B	UK	Album	Additional information
1990	"New Power Generation"	64	27	26	Graffiti Bridge	The New Power Generation provides backing vox
1995	"Purple Medley"	84	74	33	N/A	The New Power Generation contributes additional music

== See also ==
- List of artists who reached number one in the United States
- List of artists who reached number one on the U.S. dance chart
- The Revolution
