= Diamonds and Pearls =

Studio album by Prince and the New Power Generation
- Released: October 1, 1991
- Recorded: July 1990 – May 1991
- Studios: Paisley Park, Chanhassen; Olympic, London; Larrabee, North Hollywood
- Genres: Funk; new jack swing; pop; R&B; dance
- Length: 65:45; 424:02 (Super Deluxe Edition)
- Labels: Paisley Park; Warner Bros.
- Producer: Prince

Prince chronology
Graffiti Bridge (1990)	Diamonds and Pearls (1991)	Love Symbol (1992)

The New Power Generation chronology
Diamonds and Pearls (1991)	Love Symbol (1992)

International release

Singles from Diamonds and Pearls
- 1. "Gett Off" Released: June 7, 1991; 2. "Cream" Released: September 9, 1991; 3. "Insatiable" Released: November 4, 1991; 4. "Diamonds and Pearls" Released: November 25, 1991; 5. "Money Don't Matter 2 Night" Released: March 3, 1992; 6. "Thunder" Released: June 15, 1992 (UK)

Professional ratings
Review scores
Source	Rating
AllMusic	3.5/5 stars
Blender	3/5 stars
Calgary Herald	B
Christgau's Consumer Guide	(2-star Honorable Mention)
Entertainment Weekly	C
Tom Hull	B+
MusicHound Rock	3.5/5
NME	6/10
Pitchfork	8.3/10 (2016); 7.8/10 (2023)
The Rolling Stone Album Guide	2.5/5 stars

Diamonds and Pearls is the thirteenth studio album by American recording artist Prince, and the first with his backing band The New Power Generation. It was released on October 1, 1991, by Paisley Park Records and Warner Bros. Records. The album produced several hit singles, including "Gett Off", "Cream", "Money Don't Matter 2 Night", "Insatiable", and the title track. Dancers Lori Werner (then dancing under the stage name of Lori Elle) and Robia LaMorte, known as "Diamond" and "Pearl" respectively, appeared on the holographic cover (re-pressings of the album are non holographic). Diamond and Pearl also appeared in the music videos for "Cream", "Strollin'", "Gett Off", and the title track, and also participated in Prince's Diamonds and Pearls Tour.

Diamonds and Pearls contains a hybrid of music styles, from the funk of "Daddy Pop", "Jughead", and first single "Gett Off", to some of the more mainstream pop/rock songs Prince had recorded in some time, such as "Cream", "Money Don't Matter 2 Night" and the title song. "Willing and Able" was used in a video montage during the closing credits of CBS' coverage of Super Bowl XXVI.

== Release ==
Diamonds and Pearls was released in the United States on October 1, 1991, and internationally two days later. It peaked at number three on the Billboard 200, number two on the UK Albums Chart, and number one on the Billboard Top R&B Albums and Australia's ARIA Albums Chart. It also peaked in the top 10 across several charts in Europe and New Zealand. The album gathered two top 5 singles: the title track, which peaked at number three on the Billboard Hot 100, and his career-final Hot 100 number-one single, "Cream". "Gett Off" and "Money Don't Matter 2 Night" both hit the top 40 on the Hot 100, peaking at 21 and 23, respectively.

Diamonds and Pearls was reissued in remastered, deluxe and super deluxe versions on October 27, 2023. The super deluxe version contains a 2023 remaster of the album, 15 remastered versions of all the singles mixes and edits, 33 previously unreleased studio recordings, an unreleased live concert album of the official dress rehearsal of the Diamonds and Pearls Tour recorded at Glam Slam on January 11, 1992. The final disc, a Blu-ray, includes the Glam Slam performance; footage from a Special Olympics concert recorded on July 20, 1991, and the soundcheck the day before; and a restored version of the Diamonds and Pearls Video Collection. A limited edition 7" vinyl set of the singles from Diamonds and Pearls included the new single "Alice Through the Looking Glass."

== Track listing ==
=== Original album ===
All lyrics are written by Prince, except where noted; all music is composed by Prince and The New Power Generation.

Diamonds and Pearls track listing
No.	Title	Writer(s)	Length
1.	"Thunder"		5:45
2.	"Daddy Pop"		5:16
3.	"Diamonds and Pearls"		4:47
4.	"Cream"		4:13
5.	"Strollin'"		3:47
6.	"Willing and Able"	Prince; Levi Seacer, Jr.; Tony Mosley	5:00
7.	"Gett Off"	Prince; Leeds	4:31
8.	"Walk Don't Walk"		3:07
9.	"Jughead"	Prince; Mosley; Kirk Johnson	4:59
10.	"Money Don't Matter 2 Night"	Prince; Rosie Gaines	4:47
11.	"Push"	Prince; Gaines	5:53
12.	"Insatiable"		6:39
13.	"Live 4 Love (Last Words from the Cockpit)"	Prince; Mosley	6:59
Total length:			65:45

=== Remastered, deluxe and super deluxe editions ===
All songs written by Prince and The New Power Generation, except where noted.

Disc 2 / LP3&4: Singles & Mixes Remastered track listing
No.	Title	Length
1.	"Gett Off (Damn Near 10 Minutes)"	9:36
2.	"Gett Off (Houstyle)"	8:24
3.	"Violet the Organ Grinder"	5:05
4.	"Gangster Glam"	6:04
5.	"Horny Pony"	4:19
6.	"Cream" (NPG mix)	5:46
7.	"Things Have Gotta Change" (Tony M. rap)	3:58
8.	"Do Your Dance" (K.C. remix)	6:00
9.	"Insatiable" (edit)	4:03
10.	"Diamonds and Pearls" (edit)	4:21
11.	"Money Don't Matter 2 Night" (edit)	4:14
12.	"Call the Law"	4:19
13.	"Willing and Able" (edit)	4:17
14.	"Willing and Able" (video version)	5:09
15.	"Thunder" (DJ fade)	3:20
Total length:		78:55

Disc 3 / LP5&6: Vault Tracks I track listing
No.	Title	Length
1.	"Schoolyard"	7:10
2.	"My Tender Heart"	5:06
3.	"Pain"	5:57
4.	"Streetwalker"	4:48
5.	"Lauriann"	4:15
6.	"Darkside"	5:35
7.	"Insatiable" (early mix – full version)	8:01
8.	"Glam Slam '91"	6:16
9.	"Live 4 Love" (early version)	7:32
10.	"Cream" (Take 2)	4:50
11.	"Skip to My You My Darling"	3:57
12.	"Diamonds and Pearls" (long version)	5:32
Total length:		68:59

Disc 4 / LP7&8 (Side 1): Vault Tracks II track listing
No.	Title	Length
1.	"Daddy Pop" (long version)	6:07
2.	"Martika's Kitchen"	4:21
3.	"Spirit"	4:32
4.	"Open Book"	4:59
5.	"Work That Fat"	4:35
6.	"Horny Pony" (Version 2)	4:21
7.	"Something Funky (This House Comes)" (band version)	7:04
8.	"Hold Me"	4:36
9.	"Blood on the Sheets"	5:46
10.	"The Last Dance (Bang Pow Zoom and the Whole Nine)"	5:36
11.	"Don't Say U Love Me"	4:21
Total length:		56:18

Disc 5 / LP8&9 (Side 2): Vault Tracks III track listing
No.	Title	Length
1.	"Get Blue"	4:43
2.	"Tip o' My Tongue"	4:08
3.	"The Voice"	4:42
4.	"Trouble"	5:36
5.	"Alice Through the Looking Glass"	4:18
6.	"Standing at the Altar"	4:48
7.	"Hey U"	6:10
8.	"Letter 4 Miles"	4:36
9.	"I Pledge Allegiance to Your Love"	4:41
10.	"The Thunder Ballet"	10:56
Total length:		54:38

Disc 6 / LP10&11 (Side 1): Live at Glam Slam 1992 I track listing
No.	Title	Length
1.	"Thunder"	4:18
2.	"Daddy Pop"	6:23
3.	"Diamonds and Pearls"	5:31
4.	"Willing and Able"	4:12
5.	"Jughead"	6:52
6.	"The Sacrifice of Victor"	10:05
7.	"Nothing Compares 2 U"	4:50
8.	"Thieves in the Temple"	7:01
9.	"Sexy M.F."	5:45
Total length:		54:57

Disc 7 / LP11&12 (Side 2): Live at Glam Slam 1992 II track listing
No.	Title	Length
1.	"Insatiable"	7:42
2.	"Cream / Well Done / I Want U / In the Socket"	13:58
3.	"1999 / Baby I'm a Star / Push"	9:12
4.	"Gett Off"	6:11
5.	"Gett Off (Houstyle)"	8:05
Total length:		45:08

Blu-ray: Live at Glam Slam 1992 / Special Olympics at Minneapolis Metrodome 1991 / Diamonds and Pearls Video Collection track listing
No.	Title	Length
1.	"Thunder" (Live at Glam Slam January 11, 1992)
2.	"Daddy Pop" (Live at Glam Slam January 11, 1992)
3.	"Diamonds and Pearls" (Live at Glam Slam January 11, 1992)
4.	"Willing and Able" (Live at Glam Slam January 11, 1992)
5.	"Jughead" (Live at Glam Slam January 11, 1992)
6.	"The Sacrifice of Victor" (Live at Glam Slam January 11, 1992)
7.	"Nothing Compares 2 U" (Live at Glam Slam January 11, 1992)
8.	"Thieves in the Temple" (Live at Glam Slam January 11, 1992)
9.	"Sexy M.F." (Live at Glam Slam January 11, 1992)
10.	"Insatiable" (Live at Glam Slam January 11, 1992)
11.	"Cream / Well Done / I Want U / In the Socket" (Live at Glam Slam January 11, 1992)
12.	"1999 / Baby I'm a Star / Push" (Live at Glam Slam January 11, 1992)
13.	"Gett Off" (Live at Glam Slam January 11, 1992)
14.	"Gett Off (Houstyle)" (Live at Glam Slam January 11, 1992)
15.	"Let's Go Crazy / Baby I'm a Star / Push" (Special Olympics Soundcheck July 19, 1991)
16.	"Diamonds and Pearls" (Special Olympics July 20, 1991)
17.	"Let's Go Crazy / Baby I'm a Star / Push" (Special Olympics July 20, 1991)
18.	"Introduction" (Diamonds and Pearls Video Collection)
19.	"Thunder" (Live) (Diamonds and Pearls Video Collection)
20.	"Gett Off" (Diamonds and Pearls Video Collection)
21.	"Cream" (Diamonds and Pearls Video Collection)
22.	"Diamonds and Pearls" (Diamonds and Pearls Video Collection)
23.	"Dr. Feelgood" (Live) (Diamonds and Pearls Video Collection)
24.	"Call the Law" (Diamonds and Pearls Video Collection)
25.	"Willing and Able" (Diamonds and Pearls Video Collection)
26.	"Jughead" (Live) (Diamonds and Pearls Video Collection)
27.	"Insatiable" (Diamonds and Pearls Video Collection)
28.	"Strollin'" (Diamonds and Pearls Video Collection)
29.	"Money Don't Matter 2 Night" (Diamonds and Pearls Video Collection)
30.	"Live 4 Love" (Live) (Diamonds and Pearls Video Collection)

== Personnel ==
- Prince – lead and backing vocals, electric and acoustic guitars, Roland D-50, E-mu Emax, Korg M1, Korg T3, bass guitar, drums, Roland R-8, Linn LM-1, finger cymbals
- Rosie Gaines – co-lead vocals (3, 7, 8, 11), backing vocals (2, 4, 6–9), Hammond organ (2, 4, 6), Korg T3 and Roland D-50 (9)
- Tommy Barbarella – synthesizers (2–4, 6–8)
- Levi Seacer, Jr. – bass guitar (2, 5, 6, 8–10), electric rhythm guitar (4, 7), backing vocals (7)
- Sonny T. – bass guitar (3, 4, 7, 13)
- Michael B. – drums (2–8, 10, 13)
- Sheila E. – synth drum fills (3)
- Damon Dickson – percussion (6, 7, 9), backing vocals (7)
- Kirk Johnson – percussion (6, 7, 9), backing vocals (7)
- Eric Leeds – flute (7)
- Tony M. – rap (2, 6, 7, 9, 11, 13)
- Elisa Fiorillo – additional vocals (2, 8)
- Clare Fischer – sampled orchestration (11)

=== Production ===
- Arranged and produced by Prince and The New Power Generation
- Engineered by Keith "KC" Cohen, David Friedlander, Michael Koppelman, Matt Larson, Sylvia Massy, Steve Noonan, Tim Penn and Brian Poer
- Mixed by Michael Koppelman, Keith Cohen and Tom Garneau
- Mastered by Michael Koppelman
- Atmos mixing by Chris James
- CD and Atmos mastering by Brad Blackwood
- Vinyl and CD mastering by Bernie Grundman

== Singles and chart placings ==
- "Gett Off" maxi-single (#21 US, #6 US R&B, #4 UK, #8 AUS)
1. "Gett Off"
2. "Horny Pony"
- "Cream" maxi-single (#1 US, #15 UK, #2 AUS)
1. "Cream"
2. "Horny Pony"
- "Insatiable" (#3 US R&B)
1. "Insatiable"
2. "I Love U in Me"
- "Diamonds and Pearls" maxi-single (#3 US, #1 US R&B, #25 UK, #13 AUS)
1. "Diamonds and Pearls"
2. "Q in Doubt"
- "Money Don't Matter 2 Night" maxi-single (#23 US, #14 US R&B, #19 UK, #18 AUS)
1. "Money Don't Matter 2 Night"
2. "Call the Law"
3. "Push" (UK)
- "Thunder" maxi-single (#28 UK)
1. "Thunder"
2. "Violet the Organ Grinder"
3. "Gett Off" (Thrust Dub)

== Charts ==
=== Weekly charts ===
Weekly chart performance for Diamonds and Pearls
Chart (1991–1992)	Peak position
Australian ARIA Albums Chart	1
Austrian Albums Chart	4
Canadian RPM Albums Chart	8
Dutch Albums Chart	6
Finnish Albums (Suomen virallinen lista)	7
French SNEP Albums Chart	8
German Media Control Albums Chart	8
Japanese Oricon Albums Chart	9
New Zealand Albums Chart	5
Norwegian Albums Chart	5
Spanish Albums Chart	8
Swedish Albums Chart	8
Swiss Albums Chart	3
UK Albums Chart	2
US Billboard 200	3
US Billboard R&B Albums	1

Chart performance for Diamonds and Pearls (deluxe version)
Chart (2023)	Peak position
Austrian Albums (Ö3 Austria)	9
Belgian Albums (Ultratop Flanders)	8
Belgian Albums (Ultratop Wallonia)	6
Dutch Albums (Album Top 100)	5
German Albums (Offizielle Top 100)	12
Hungarian Albums (MAHASZ)	18
Japanese Albums (Oricon)	32
Japanese Hot Albums (Billboard Japan)	34
Portuguese Albums (AFP)	34
Scottish Albums (Official Charts)	14
Spanish Albums (Promusicae)	91

=== Year-end charts ===
1991 year-end chart performance for Diamonds and Pearls
Chart (1991)	Position
Canadian Albums Chart	47
Dutch Albums Chart	45
French Albums Chart	15
UK Albums Chart	27

1992 year-end chart performance for Diamonds and Pearls
Chart (1992)	Position
Austrian Albums Chart	17
Swiss Albums Chart	22
UK Albums Chart	38
US Billboard 200	31

== Certifications and sales ==
Certifications and sales for Diamonds and Pearls
Region	Certification	Certified units/sales
Australia (ARIA)	4× Platinum	280,000^{^}
Austria (IFPI Austria)	Platinum	50,000^{*}
Canada (Music Canada)	Platinum	100,000^{^}
France (SNEP)	Platinum	500,000
Germany (BVMI)	Platinum	500,000^{^}
Netherlands (NVPI)	Platinum	100,000^{^}
New Zealand (RMNZ)	Gold	7,500^{^}
Spain (Promusicae)	Platinum	100,000^{^}
Sweden (GLF)	Gold	50,000^{^}
Switzerland (IFPI Switzerland)	Platinum	50,000^{^}
United Kingdom (BPI)	3× Platinum	900,000^{^}
United States (RIAA)	2× Platinum	2,000,000^{^}
Summaries
Worldwide	—	7,100,000
^{*} Sales figures based on certification alone.^{^} Shipments figures based on certification alone.

== See also ==
- 1991 in music
- List of Billboard number-one R&B albums of 1991
