= Insatiable (Prince song) =

- US 12" promo

Single by Prince and The New Power Generation

from the album Diamonds and Pearls
- B-side: "I Love U in Me"
- Released: November 4, 1991
- Recorded: October 8, 1990
- Studio: Larrabee, Hollywood, California
- Genre: Soul
- Length: 4:01 (7" edit); 6:37 (album version)
- Label: Paisley Park/Warner Bros.
- Songwriter: Prince
- Producer: Prince

Prince and The New Power Generation singles chronology
"Cream" (1991)	"Insatiable" (1991)	"Diamonds and Pearls" (1991)

Music video
- "Insatiable" on YouTube

"Insatiable" is a song by American musician Prince and The New Power Generation, from their 1991 album Diamonds and Pearls. It is a slow, simmering ballad that often draws comparisons to 1989's "Scandalous!". The B-side was "I Love U in Me", which was originally the B-side to "The Arms of Orion". "Insatiable" was only released in the US as a 7" single, a 12" promo was sent only to Urban radio stations, and the track was not released to Pop radio stations. It performed well on the R&B chart, reaching number 3, but did not break the top 40 on the US Pop chart. Its single sales were moderate, and it received heavy airplay on Urban and UAC radio stations, but it did not make the Hot 100 Airplay (the R&B airplay chart did not appear until spring 1992).

== Critical reception ==
In a retrospective review, Patrick Corcoran of Albumism wrote that "Insatiable" is "the kind of rich, lush ballad Prince has dropped since day one, dripping in desire and barely concealed lust." He stated that "showcasing the best falsetto since Curtis Mayfield's, it serves as a reminder of Prince’s vocal dexterity and prowess". Upon the single release, Larry Flick from Billboard magazine remarked that "Cream" "has just barely risen to the top of the Hot 100 and Prince has already unleashed another jewel from his Diamonds and Pearls set." He also felt that on the song, "racy lyrics are balanced by a slow'n'grinding R&B instrumental foundation and acrobatic vocals. Overall, a highly sensual listening experience." A reviewer from People Magazine said it "sounds like Percy Sledge meets Peter Gabriel." David Fricke from Rolling Stone viewed it as a "sumptuous ballad". Scott Poulson-Bryant from Spin described it as "gliding Retro-soul balladry".

== Music video ==
A music video was produced to promote the single, directed by Randee St. Nicholas. It was published on Prince's official YouTube channel in September 2017, and has generated millions of views.

== Personnel ==
Credits from Princevault, Benoît Clerc and Guitarcloud

- Prince – lead and backing vocals, grand piano, Roland D-50, E-mu Emax, Roland R-8

== Charts ==
=== Weekly charts ===
Weekly chart performance for "Insatiable"
Chart (1991–1992)	Peak position
US Billboard Hot 100	77
US Hot R&B/Hip-Hop Songs (Billboard)	3

=== Year-end charts ===
Year-end chart performance for "Insatiable"
Chart (1992)	Position
US Hot R&B/Hip-Hop Songs (Billboard)	56
