= Money Don't Matter 2 Night =

1992 single by Prince and the New Power Generation

- UK 7-inch single

Single by Prince and the New Power Generation

from the album Diamonds and Pearls
- B-side: "Call the Law"; "Push"
- Released: March 3, 1992
- Recorded: September 4, 1990
- Studio: Warner Pioneer (Japan)
- Genre: Philadelphia soul; pop; smooth soul; quiet storm
- Length: 4:48 (album and 12-inch version); 4:12 (7-inch edit)
- Label: Paisley Park; Warner Bros.
- Songwriters: Prince; Rosie Gaines
- Producer: Prince

Prince and the New Power Generation singles chronology
"Diamonds and Pearls" (1991)	"Money Don't Matter 2 Night" (1992)	"Thunder" (1992)

Music video
- "Money Don't Matter 2 Night" on YouTube

"Money Don't Matter 2 Night" is a song by American musician Prince and the New Power Generation from their 1991 album, Diamonds and Pearls. The song was released in March 1992 by Paisley Park and Warner. Co-written with Rosie Gaines, the lyrics deal directly with money, poverty, and greed, and overall, the song is a smooth delivery with layered vocals by Prince. It peaked at number 23 on the US Billboard Hot 100 and number 19 on the UK Singles Chart. The accompanying music video was directed by Spike Lee.

The B-side is a previously unreleased track "Call the Law", with lead vocals by Tony M., supplemented by Rosie Gaines on the chorus. Prince provides guitar solos throughout the song. The track was added to the New Power Generation release Goldnigga in 1993. The UK 12-inch single and CD release also included the album track "Push".

== Chart performance ==
"Money Don't Matter 2 Night" was an overall modest hit, reaching numbers 23 and 24 on the US Billboard Hot 100 and Billboard Hot 100 Airplay charts respectively, number 14 on the Billboard Hot R&B Singles chart, and number 27 on the Airplay chart. It also reached number 19 in the UK, number 18 in Australia, and number seven in the Netherlands.

== Critical reception ==
A reviewer from Cashbox wrote, "The single is real mellow and more laid-back compared to most of his previous material. This cut should attract R&B, adult contemporary, pop and easy listening radio stations with ease. Mark down another hit." David Browne from Entertainment Weekly called it "one startling moment" from the album, that "is sung in a soulful growl that sounds utterly unaffected". He also added that it "sports a slinky, subtle groove that recalls the maturity of Stevie Wonder’s early-’70s heyday." A writer from the Gavin Report commented, "Strictly a lyrical record in which Prince speaks of the priceless and the invaluable as well as the here-today and the gone-tomorrow. An easy going, if not carefree musical treat."

Pan-European magazine Music & Media found that after a ballad, "Diamonds and Pearls", "his royal badness speeds up the tempo just a little bit, for a nicely floating and immediately catchy number." Gavin Martin from NME felt the song is where Diamonds and Pearls "really shines in unadorned glory". Tom Doyle from Smash Hits named it "the best song" on the LP, and "the best tune he's done for years." He remarked that here, Prince "gets into a laidback groove".

== Retrospective response ==
In a 2016 retrospective review, Patrick Corcoran from Albumism said, "As lyrically scathing as anything he'd written to that point, it included the scarily prescient line "anything's better than a picture of a child in a cloud of gas"." He added, "Capturing the zeitgeist as Iraq was invaded for the first time, but also heartbreakingly, perpetually relevant to our times too, Prince's restrained delivery fits perfectly." Stephen Thomas Erlewine from AllMusic noted the "extraordinary Philly soul" of "the neglected masterpiece", viewing it as a "terrific" pop single. Mike Diver for the BBC in 2010, stated in his 2010 review, that "there's no doubting "Money Don't Matter 2 Night" is the heart and soul of this album. A slow-paced strut, the track's a celebration of realising that hard cash isn't the be all and end all of one's existence". Simon Price from The Guardian named the song as a "highlight" from the album in 2016, describing it as "thoughtfully mature". Another The Guardian editor, Alexis Petridis, said it is "a fantastic song, the smoothness of its sound and delivery masking a punchy, politically engaged lyric that takes in both consumerism and Operation Desert Storm."

== Music videos ==
The song is notable for its promotional video, directed by Spike Lee. Featuring a poverty-stricken African-American family, with no shots of Prince, it was considered overly political and not "MTV friendly". A second version was issued, which included footage of the song performed by Prince and the New Power Generation, which was directed by Sotera Tschetter.

== Personnel ==
Personnel are adapted from Benoît Clerc and Guitarcloud

- Prince – lead and backing vocals, electric guitar, synthesizers, Roland R-8
- Levi Seacer Jr. – bass guitar
- Michael B. – drums

== Charts ==
=== Weekly charts ===
Weekly chart performance for "Money Don't Matter 2 Night"
Chart (1992)	Peak position
Australia (ARIA)	18
Austria (Ö3 Austria Top 40)	23
Belgium (Ultratop 50 Flanders)	27
Canada Top Singles (RPM)	19
Europe (Eurochart Hot 100)	24
Europe (European Dance Radio)	6
Europe (European Hit Radio)	4
France (SNEP)	26
Germany (GfK)	48
Ireland (IRMA)	10
Italy (Musica e dischi)	16
Netherlands (Dutch Top 40)	7
Netherlands (Single Top 100)	9
New Zealand (Recorded Music NZ)	20
Sweden (Sverigetopplistan)	34
Switzerland (Schweizer Hitparade)	23
UK Singles (Official Charts)	19
UK Airplay (Music Week)	2
US Billboard Hot 100	23
US Hot R&B/Hip-Hop Songs (Billboard)	14
US Cash Box Top 100	20

=== Year-end charts ===
Year-end chart performance for "Money Don't Matter 2 Night"
Chart (1992)	Position
UK Airplay (Music Week)	69

== Release history ==
Release dates and formats for "Money Don't Matter 2 Night"
Region	Date	Format(s)	Label(s)	Ref.
United States	March 3, 1992	7-inch vinyl; cassette	Paisley Park; Warner Bros.	
United Kingdom	March 16, 1992	7-inch vinyl; 12-inch vinyl; CD; cassette	Paisley Park; Warner Bros.	
Australia	April 13, 1992	12-inch vinyl; CD; cassette	Paisley Park; Warner Bros.	
