= Diamonds and Pearls (song) =

- UK 7-inch single

Single by Prince and the New Power Generation

from the album Diamonds and Pearls
- B-side: "X-cerpts from the Songs: Thunder, Daddy Pop, Strollin', Money Don't Matter 2 Night, Push, Live 4 Love"; "Q in Doubt"; "Housebangers"; "Cream" (N.P.G. mix); "Things Have Gotta Change"; "2 the Wire"; "Do Your Dance"
- Released: November 25, 1991
- Recorded: November 19, 1990
- Studio: Paisley Park (Chanhassen, Minnesota)
- Genre: Pop; R&B; soft rock; soul
- Length: 4:45 (album version); 4:20 (radio edit); 5:32 (extended version)
- Label: Paisley Park; Warner Bros.
- Songwriter: Prince
- Producer: Prince

Prince and the New Power Generation singles chronology
"Insatiable" (1991)	"Diamonds and Pearls" (1991)	"Money Don't Matter 2 Night" (1992)

Music video
- "Diamonds and Pearls" on YouTube

"Diamonds and Pearls" is the title track of American musician Prince and the New Power Generation's 1991 album and was released as a single in November 1991 by Paisley Park and Warner Bros. The song is an upbeat ballad, given a rock edge with guitar and heavy drumming. It also features the vocals of NPG member Rosie Gaines. The ballad is an expression of love and not lust, as is the theme on some of the other singles from the album. It was a top-10 hit, reaching number one on the US Cash Box Top 100 and number three on the US Billboard Hot 100 as well as the top spot on the Billboard R&B chart. The pearls in the accompanying music video come from Connie Parente, a Los Angeles jewelry collector and designer.

The B-side is a mix of excerpts of other Diamonds and Pearls tracks, which serves to promote the album. There was no extended version of the song released. However the extended version can be found on the Super Deluxe Edition of the album. The UK B-side included some of the mixes on the "Cream" maxi single.

The repeated lyric "If I gave you diamonds and pearls, would you be a happy boy or a girl?" echoes the lyrics "I'll buy you diamonds and pearls only if you're good girl" from Prince's 1982 song "International Lover".

== Critical reception ==
Larry Flick from Billboard magazine wrote that the song is a "soft and soulful lullaby that should keep momentum building at top 40. Once again, Rosie Gaines' vocal support is a true delight." Clark and DeVaney from Cashbox said it's "actually a soulful R&B ballad-gone-mad with der-Prince's guitar work and production." They noted that Gaines is "sounding quite like she needs her own record, something she will no doubt get from her close-knit pals at Paisley." Rufer and Fell from the Gavin Report stated that Gaines "absolutely nails her part."

George Caplan from Melody Maker praised it as "a cluster of gems, a sacred, monumental ballad to counterweigh the delicious profanity elsewhere." Pan-European magazine Music & Media commented, "The melody of this mellow ballad and title track of his new album rings a bell for soul fanatics. It recalls Bobby Goldsboro's famous tune 'Summer (The First Time)', as recorded by Millie Jackson on her classic Caught Up album." Gavin Martin from NME named it a "pure pop schlock, a lushly layered but shallow ballad". A reviewer from People Magazine called it a "mushy mess". Tom Doyle from Smash Hits viewed it as "smaltzy over-the-top-balladeering".

=== Retrospective response ===
In a 2016 retrospective review, Patrick Corcoran from Albumism stated that the song's "fairy tale fanfares, sizeable doses of pomp and the delicious interplay between Gaines' and Prince's voices serve up an undeniably touching ballad that delicately and deftly walks the line between sweet and saccharine." Stephen Thomas Erlewine from AllMusic called it a "drippy mainstream ballad" and a "terrific" pop single. Mike Diver for the BBC in 2010 described it as a "brilliant ballad" in his 2010 review. In 2016, Jeff Weiss from Pitchfork said it's a "twinkling locket-pop ballad", and "one of those songs they'll play at weddings until we stop using diamond engagement rings and the ocean runs out of pearls." He added, "It's Prince at his best". In Rolling Stone's ranking of "25 Essential Prince Songs" in 2020, an editor described it as a "sultry ballad", that "intricately wedded the singer's love of glitz and glamour with a distinct, ever-evolving pop-R&B sensibility."

== Chart performance ==
"Diamonds and Pearls" peaked at numbers one and three on the US Cash Box Top 100 and Billboard Hot 100, and number one on the Billboard Hot R&B Singles chart. In Europe, it was a top-10 hit in Switzerland while entering the top 20 in Austria, Belgium, France, the Netherlands, and Sweden. In the United Kingdom, it peaked at number 25 on the UK Singles Chart, while in Europe, it reached number 29 on the Eurochart Hot 100. In Australia and New Zealand, the single peaked at numbers 13 and eight, respectively.

== Track listings ==
- UK 7-inch
1. "Diamonds and Pearls" (LP version) – 4:45
2. "Q in Doubt" – 4:00
- US 7-inch and Japan CD
1. "Diamonds and Pearls" (edit) – 4:20
2. "X-cerpts from the Songs: Thunder, Daddy Pop, Strollin', Money Don't Matter 2 Night, Push, Live 4 Love" – 5:04
- UK 12-inch
1. "Diamonds and Pearls" (LP version) – 4:45
2. "Do Your Dance" (Housebangers) – 4:23
3. "Cream" (N.P.G. mix) – 4:54
4. "Things Have Gotta Change" (Tony M. Rap) – 3:57
- UK CD
1. "Diamonds and Pearls" (LP version) – 4:45
2. "2 the Wire" (Creamy Instrumental) – 3:13
3. "Do Your Dance" (KC's Remix) – 5:58

== Personnel ==
Personnel are taken from Benoît Clerc and Guitarcloud.

- Prince – lead and backing vocals, electric guitar, synthesizers, Roland R-8
- Rosie Gaines – co-lead and backing vocals
- Tommy Barbarella – synthesizers
- Sheila E. – synth drum fills
- Sonny T. – bass guitar
- Michael B. – drums

== Charts ==
=== Weekly charts ===
Weekly chart performance for "Diamonds and Pearls"
Chart (1991–1992)	Peak position
Australia (ARIA)	13
Austria (Ö3 Austria Top 40)	19
Belgium (Ultratop 50 Flanders)	12
Canada Top Singles (RPM)	5
Europe (Eurochart Hot 100)	29
Europe (European Dance Radio)	3
Europe (European Hit Radio)	6
France (SNEP)	20
Germany (GfK)	28
Luxembourg (Radio Luxembourg)	15
Netherlands (Dutch Top 40)	15
Netherlands (Single Top 100)	15
New Zealand (Recorded Music NZ)	8
Sweden (Sverigetopplistan)	12
Switzerland (Schweizer Hitparade)	7
UK Singles (Official Charts)	25
UK Airplay (Music Week)	10
US Billboard Hot 100	3
US Adult Contemporary (Billboard)	40
US Hot R&B/Hip-Hop Songs (Billboard)	1
US Cash Box Top 100	1

=== Year-end charts ===
Year-end chart performance for "Diamonds and Pearls"
Chart (1992)	Position
New Zealand (RIANZ)	49
Sweden (Topplistan)	90
US Billboard Hot 100	25
US Cash Box Top 100	37

== Release history ==
Release dates and formats for "Diamonds and Pearls"
Region	Date	Format(s)	Label(s)	Ref.
United Kingdom	November 25, 1991	7-inch vinyl; 12-inch vinyl; CD; cassette	Paisley Park; Warner Bros.	
Japan	December 21, 1991	Mini-CD	Paisley Park; Warner Bros.	
Australia	January 20, 1992	12-inch vinyl; CD; cassette	Paisley Park; Warner Bros.	

== See also ==
- List of number-one R&B singles of 1992 (U.S.)
