= Gett Off =

1991 single by Prince and the New Power Generation

- UK 7-inch single

Single by Prince and the New Power Generation

from the album Diamonds and Pearls
- B-side: "Horny Pony"
- Released: June 7, 1991
- Recorded: May 10, 1991
- Studio: Paisley Park (Chanhassen, Minnesota)
- Genre: Funk; new jack swing
- Length: 4:31 (album version); 4:00 (UK single version)
- Label: Paisley Park; Warner Bros.
- Songwriter: Prince
- Producer: Prince

Prince and the New Power Generation singles chronology
"New Power Generation" (1990)	"Gett Off" (1991)	"Cream" (1991)

Music video
- "Gett Off" on YouTube

"Gett Off" is a song written and produced by American musician Prince, released in June 1991 by Paisley Park and Warner Bros. as the lead single from his thirteenth album, Diamonds and Pearls (1991). The album was his first with his backing band the New Power Generation. "Gett Off" was a hit on both sides of the Atlantic, reaching number four in the United Kingdom; the maxi-single was too long and pricey to appear on the UK Singles Chart, so this release was classified as an album, peaking at number 33 on the UK Albums Chart in August 1991.

In the United States, the single reached number 21 on the Billboard Hot 100 and number six on the Billboard Hot R&B Singles chart. In addition, it was Prince's seventh and final song to reach number one on the Billboard Hot Dance Club Songs chart. The accompanying music video for the song was directed by Randee St. Nicholas. "Gett Off" was ranked at number 97 on VH1's list of the "100 Greatest Songs of the '90s".

== Background and release ==
"Gett Off" evolved from several earlier compositions, starting with the song "Glam Slam" from 1988's Lovesexy. Prince created an unreleased remix in October 1990 called "Glam Slam '91", which used the chorus of "Glam Slam", but with new music and lyrics that borrowed partially from Graffiti Bridge's "Love Machine". Prince toyed with the song some more, adding a new chorus, and involving the newly formed New Power Generation. The song was renamed "Gett Off", which was very similar to a B-side/remix called "Get Off" from the maxi single release of "New Power Generation", also from Graffiti Bridge. "Gett Off" also uses a few musical segments from "Get Off". The new track features vocal contributions from Rosie Gaines and Tony M., and flute by long-time Prince associate Eric Leeds. Prince also contributes a guitar solo.

Prince delivered the song exclusively to nightclubs on his 33rd birthday on a now valuable 12-inch single featuring the otherwise unavailable "Gett Off (Damn Near 10 Minutes Mix)" remix. It was so well-received that Prince decided to release the song commercially as a single with the rap song "Horny Pony" as its B-side, and also as a maxi single with several remixes, which varied from country to country. He also added it at the last minute to Diamonds and Pearls, replacing "Horny Pony" (on the packaging for Diamonds and Pearls, "Horny Pony" is written in red over "Gett Off", to fit in with the narrative track listing that was already finished.) Coincidentally, "Gett Off" contains a sample from 'Horny Pony'. As well as being conceived from other compositions, it served as the musical blueprint for "Blue Light" and "Get Wild".

== Critical reception ==
Larry Flick from Billboard magazine wrote that "this delicious sleaze-speed funk dish cuts deep with an intense bass line, vocal shrieks, and racy lyrics." A reviewer from Music Week said the song is "a brilliant curtain raiser for his new album. Cool and funky, it evokes memories of George Clinton and Gil Scott-Heron, while remaining totally original. Massive." Machgiel Bakker from Music & Media called it a "hectic funk workout". People Magazine wrote that the singer will "blind you with his brilliance, as he does on the conspicuously funky "Gett Off"." NME ranked it number 32 in their list of "Singles of the Year" in December 1991. David Fricke from Rolling Stone commented, "Dirty Mind goes house".

Stephen Thomas Erlewine from AllMusic described it as a "slamming dancefloor rallying cry" and a "terrific" pop single. Neil McKay from Sunday Life noted that it features "heavy dance".

Mike Diver for the BBC felt in his 2010 review, that it's "more explicit" and "borrows a line or two from James Brown but is undeniably Prince through and through". Simon Price from The Guardian named it a "highlight" from the Diamonds and Pearls album, describing it as "hilariously immature". Jeff Weiss from Pitchfork said the song "led to more unplanned pregnancies than anything Prince had recorded" since "Kiss". Another The Guardian editor, Alexis Petridis, stated, "From its opening scream to its ferocious concluding guitar solo, Gett Off is prime-quality Prince: funny, lubricious, preposterously funky, every bit the equal of his best work." Patrick Corcoran of Albumism felt that the song's "exhortation to "23 positions in a one night stand" was a lightning conduit for rampant male sexuality, unfettered by the playful androgyny of the past."

== Music video ==
An official music video was developed and released for the song. It is directed by Randee St. Nicholas and is notable for the appearance of Diamond & Pearl, as well as Prince's Yellow Cloud Guitar.

== "Mother Popcorn" ==
The lyrics "I like 'em fat, I like 'em proud, you've got to have a mother for me..." and the music that accompanies them in the fourth verse of "Gett Off" are paraphrased from the 1969 James Brown song "Mother Popcorn". Prince alludes to the borrowing in a vocal aside ("Reminds me of something James used to say..."). The musical quotation is preceded by a crackling noise mimicking the sound of an old vinyl record and a sample of Brown's song.

== Track listings ==
=== 7-inch releases ===
- US 7-19225
1. "Gett Off" (single remix) – 4:31
2. "Horny Pony" – 4:17
- UK W0056
- German 5439-19225-7
1. "Gett Off" (UK single remix) – 4:01
2. "Horny Pony" – 4:17

=== 12-inch releases ===
- US 0-40138
- Australian MX79029-30
- UK 0-40138
1. "Gett Off" (extended remix) – 8:31
2. "Gett Off" (Houstyle) – 8:20
3. "Violet the Organ Grinder" – 4:59
4. "Gett Off" (Flutestramental) – 7:26
5. "Gangster Glam" – 6:04
6. "Clockin' the Jizz" (Instrumental) – 4:51
- UK W0056T
- German 9362-40187-0
1. "Gett Off" (Urge Mix) – 8:20
2. "Gett Off" (Thrust Mix) – 9:29

=== CD maxi single releases ===
- US 9 40138-2
1. "Gett Off" (single remix) – 4:31
2. "Gett Off" (Houstyle) – 8:20
3. "Violet the Organ Grinder" – 4:59
4. "Gett Off" (Flutestramental) – 7:26
5. "Gangster Glam" – 6:04
6. "Clockin' the Jizz" (Instrumental) – 4:51
7. "Gett Off" (Extended Remix) – 8:31
- UK W0056CD
- German 9362-40188-2
1. "Gett Off" (UK single remix) – 4:01
2. "Gett Off" (Urge Single Edit) – 4:24
3. "Gett Off" (Purple Pump Mix) – 8:31
- Japanese WPCP-4630
1. "Gett Off" (extended remix) – 8:31
2. "Gett Off" (Houstyle) – 8:20
3. "Violet the Organ Grinder" – 4:59
4. "Gangster Glam" – 6:04
5. "Cream" (N.P.G Mix) – 4:54
6. "Things Have Gotta Change" (Tony M. Rap) – 3:57
7. "2 the Wire" (Creamy Instrumental) – 3:13
8. "Get Some Solo" – 1:31
9. "Do Your Dance" (KC's Remix) – 5:58
10. "Housebangers" – 4:23
11. "Q in Doubt" (instrumental) – 4:00
12. "Ethereal Mix" – 4:43

=== Notes ===
- "Damn Near 10 Minutes" is the original, unpolished mix.
- "Album Version", "Single Remix" and "Extended Remix" a.k.a. "Purple Pump Mix" are edits of the 'final' mix. This version has Prince say 'Club Mix' near the beginning of the song, whereas he does not in the original.
- "Urge Mix" (alternatively titled "Houstyle"), "Thrust Dub" (alternatively titled "Flutestramental"), "Thrust Single Edit", "Urge Single Edit", and "Thrust Mix" are house versions remixed by Steve "Silk" Hurley.
- "Violet the Organ Grinder", "Gangster Glam" and "Clockin' the Jizz" are variations around the original version with added rap parts, chants or instrumental parts.

== Personnel ==
Personnel are adapted from Benoît Clerc and Guitarcloud

- Prince – lead and backing vocals, rap, electric lead guitar, Roland R-8
- Rosie Gaines – co-lead and backing vocals
- Tony M. – rap
- Levi Seacer Jr. – electric rhythm guitar, backing vocals
- Tommy Barbarella – synthesizers
- Sonny T. – bass guitar
- Michael B. – drums
- Damon Dickson – percussion, backing vocals
- Kirk Johnson – percussion, backing vocals
- Eric Leeds – flute

== Charts ==
=== Weekly charts ===
1991 weekly chart performance for "Gett Off"
Chart (1991)	Peak position
Australia (ARIA)	8
Austria (Ö3 Austria Top 40)	9
Belgium (Ultratop 50 Flanders)	13
Canada Dance/Urban (RPM)	10
Denmark (IFPI)	7
Europe (Eurochart Hot 100)	4
Europe (European Dance Radio)	1
Europe (European Hit Radio)	10
Finland (Suomen virallinen lista)	5
Germany (GfK)	13
Greece (IFPI)	4
Italy (Musica e dischi)	24
Luxembourg (Radio Luxembourg)	1
Netherlands (Dutch Top 40)	4
Netherlands (Single Top 100)	3
New Zealand (Recorded Music NZ)	13
Norway (VG-lista)	7
Portugal (AFP)	4
Spain (AFYVE)	13
Sweden (Sverigetopplistan)	13
Switzerland (Schweizer Hitparade)	3
UK Singles (Official Charts)	4
UK Airplay (Music Week)	14
UK Dance (Music Week)	2
UK Club Chart (Record Mirror)	1
US Billboard Hot 100	21
US Dance Club Songs (Billboard)	1
US Dance Singles Sales (Billboard)	1
US Hot R&B/Hip-Hop Songs (Billboard)	6

2016 weekly chart performance for "Gett Off"
Chart (2016)	Peak position
France (SNEP)	97

=== Year-end charts ===
Year-end chart performance for "Gett Off"
Chart (1991)	Position
Australia (ARIA)	74
Europe (Eurochart Hot 100)	57
Europe (European Hit Radio)	73
Germany (Media Control)	100
Netherlands (Dutch Top 40)	73
Netherlands (Single Top 100)	60
Sweden (Topplistan)	64
Switzerland (Schweizer Hitparade)	27
UK Singles (OCC)	49
UK Club Chart (Record Mirror)	61
US 12-inch Singles Sales (Billboard)	23
US Dance Club Play (Billboard)	19
US Hot R&B Singles (Billboard)	83

== Release history ==
Release history and formats for "Gett Off"
Region	Date	Format(s)	Label(s)	Ref.
United States	June 7, 1991	12-inch vinyl	Paisley Park; Warner Bros.	
United Kingdom	August 19, 1991	7-inch vinyl; 12-inch vinyl; CD; cassette	Paisley Park; Warner Bros.	
Australia	September 16, 1991	12-inch vinyl; CD; cassette	Paisley Park; Warner Bros.	
Japan	December 21, 1991	CD	Paisley Park; Warner Bros.	
