= Cream (Prince song) =

1991 single by Prince and the New Power Generation

- UK 7-inch single

Single by Prince and the New Power Generation

from the album Diamonds and Pearls
- B-side: "Horny Pony"; "Gangster Glam"
- Released: September 9, 1991
- Recorded: December 3, 1990
- Studio: Paisley Park (Chanhassen, Minnesota)
- Genre: Pop; funk; glam rock; R&B
- Length: 4:12
- Label: Paisley Park; Warner Bros.
- Songwriter: Prince
- Producer: Prince

Prince and the New Power Generation singles chronology
"Gett Off" (1991)	"Cream" (1991)	"Insatiable" (1991)

Music video
- "Cream" on YouTube

"Cream" is a song by American singer-songwriter Prince and his backing band the New Power Generation, released in September 1991 by Paisley Park and Warner as the second single from Prince's 13th studio album, Diamonds and Pearls (1991). In a 2004 MTV special, Prince joked that he wrote the song while looking at himself in the mirror. "Cream" became Prince's fifth and last number-one single on the US Billboard Hot 100, staying at the top for two weeks. The song entered the top 10 in 15 other countries worldwide, peaking within the top three in Australia, Canada, Norway, and Switzerland. Its music video was directed by Rebecca Blake.

The single's B-side, "Horny Pony", a rap song that was replaced on Diamonds and Pearls at the last minute by "Gett Off", was re-used from the "Gett Off" single. "Cream" was also released as a maxi-single EP with remixes and songs/raps loosely based on "Cream". The EP is notable for including several prank telephone conversations. In the UK, "Gangster Glam" is an additional B-side on the 12-inch maxi maxi-CD single. In Japan, an EP was released with the tracks from the US maxi single, and four tracks from the US "Gett Off" maxi single.

== Chart performance ==
In the United States, "Cream" hit number one for two weeks on the Billboard Hot 100 in November 1991 as well as on the Cash Box Top 100; however, it did not make the Billboard Hot R&B Singles chart because it was not sent to urban radio; "Insatiable" was sent to urban stations instead. The song made the top 20 in the United Kingdom, peaking at number 15, while entering the top 10 in Austria (4), Belgium (10), Denmark (6), France (5), Ireland (7), Italy (4), the Netherlands (4), Norway (3), Portugal (7), Spain (8), Sweden (6) and Switzerland (3). On the Eurochart Hot 100, "Cream" climbed to number six, while reaching number two on the European Dance Radio Chart. It was also a top-10 hit in Australia, and New Zealand, peaking at number two and five, respectively.

== Critical reception ==
Upon the single release, Larry Flick from Billboard magazine remarked that after the risque "Gett Off" "comes an equally sexy pop/rocker" that recalls "Bang a Gong". He added, "Militaristic drum beats, an unshakable chorus, and snakey guitar and keyboard lines add up to a pretty good bet for multiformat acceptance." David Browne from Entertainment Weekly described it as "a standard-issue funk workout with oh-so-daring lyrics like U got the horn so why don't U blow it!". George Caplan from Melody Maker complimented it as an "excellent" single, "with its ghostly, Hendrix guitars transcending mere pastiche." Another Melody Maker editor, Everett True, wrote, "'Cream' is drab run-of-the-numbers funk, with only the occasional smoothed-out vocal to recommend it." Pan-European magazine Music & Media commented, "Could this second single from the new album Diamonds and Pearls be a leftover composition of the never-realised Prince/Bonnie Raitt collaboration?" They also concluded, "This basic R&B song is definitely his best single since 1989's "Alphabet Street"." A reviewer from People Magazine deemed it as "tart and bluesy". David Fricke from Rolling Stone described it as "Kiss" "with a garagey funkadelic kick". Another Rolling Stone editor felt the song is "impossibly slinky". Scott Poulson-Bryant from Spin viewed it as "poppy glam-rock". Neil McKay from Sunday Life complimented it as "irresistible pop".

== Retrospective response ==
In a 2016 retrospective review, Patrick Corcoran from Albumism stated that the oft-repeated tale of "Cream"'s composition "doesn't lessen the impact of its swaggering braggadocio years later". Stephen Thomas Erlewine from AllMusic called it a "sexy T. Rex groove" and a "terrific" pop single. Mike Diver for the BBC said in his 2010 review, that it is "quite simply a song about getting it on, and a brilliant one at that".

== Music video ==
A music video was made to accompany the song, directed by Rebecca Blake. It was filmed in Los Angeles on May 31 and June 1, 5 and 6, 1991.

== Influence and legacy ==
In 2020, Cleveland.com ranked "Cream" at number 33 in their list of the best Billboard Hot 100 number-one song of the 1990s, stating that it "fully realizes the sultry funk odyssey Prince was going for on his 13th studio album." The Guardian ranked it number 18 in their list of "Prince's 50 Greatest Singles – Ranked!" in 2019. Alexis Petridis viewed the song as a "glorious, loving homage to "Get It On", complete with lyrical echoes (the object of Prince's affections is "filthy-cute" as opposed to "dirty-sweet")." He added, "Never given to underestimating his own importance, Marc Bolan would doubtless have adored it." NME ranked "Cream" number 34 in their list of "Singles of the Year" in December 1991.

== Personnel ==
Personnel are from adapted from Benoît Clerc and Guitarcloud

- Prince – lead and backing vocals, electric lead guitar, Roland R-8
- Levi Seacer Jr. – electric rhythm guitar
- Rosie Gaines – Hammond organ, backing vocals
- Tommy Barbarella – synthesizers
- Sonny T. – bass guitar
- Michael B. – drums

== Track listing ==
7-inch
No.	Title	Length
1.	"Cream"	4:12
2.	"Horny Pony"	4:17

UK CD and 12-inch
No.	Title	Length
1.	"Cream"	4:12
2.	"Horny Pony"	4:17
3.	"Gangster Glam"	5:06

US CD maxi single (9 40197-2)
No.	Title	Credits	Length
1.	"Cream" (album version)		4:12/0:33
2.	"Cream" (N.P.G. Mix)		4:52/0:51
3.	"Things Have Gotta Change" (Tony M. Rap)		3:57
4.	"2 the Wire" (Creamy Instrumental)		3:13
5.	"Get Some Solo"		1:31
6.	"Do Your Dance" (KC's Remix)	Special guest vocal by Jevetta Steele; mixed and co-produced by Keith "KC" Cohen; Assisted by Dave Aron and Eric Anset at Larrabee West	5:58
7.	"Housebangers"	Additional production and Mix by Junior Vasquez; keyboard programming by Joseph Moskowitz; Remix engineer: Curt Frasca	4:23
8.	"Q in Doubt" (instrumental)	Edits by Dave Friedlander	4:00
9.	"Ethereal Mix"	Edits by Dave Friedlander	3:56/0:48

Several tracks on this release include unlisted telephone segues, and are listed with separate lengths on this page.

== Charts ==
=== Weekly charts ===
Weekly chart performance for "Cream"
Chart (1991–1992)	Peak position
Australia (ARIA)	2
Austria (Ö3 Austria Top 40)	4
Belgium (Ultratop 50 Flanders)	10
Canada Top Singles (RPM)	2
Canada Dance/Urban (RPM)	4
Denmark (IFPI)	6
Europe (Eurochart Hot 100)	6
Europe (European Dance Radio)	2
Europe (European Hit Radio)	3
Finland (Suomen virallinen lista)	15
France (SNEP)	5
Germany (GfK)	21
Ireland (IRMA)	7
Italy (Musica e dischi)	4
Luxembourg (Radio Luxembourg)	9
Netherlands (Dutch Top 40)	4
Netherlands (Single Top 100)	7
New Zealand (Recorded Music NZ)	5
Norway (VG-lista)	3
Portugal (AFP)	7
Spain (AFYVE)	8
Sweden (Sverigetopplistan)	6
Switzerland (Schweizer Hitparade)	3
UK Singles (Official Charts)	15
UK Airplay (Music Week)	13
UK Dance (Music Week)	26
US Billboard Hot 100	1
US Cash Box Top 100	1

=== Year-end charts ===
1991 year-end chart performance for "Cream"
Chart (1991)	Position
Australia (ARIA)	78
Belgium (Ultratop)	83
Canada Top Singles (RPM)	37
Europe (European Hit Radio)	32
Netherlands (Dutch Top 40)	54
Netherlands (Single Top 100)	59
Sweden (Topplistan)	37
US Billboard Hot 100	66
US Cash Box Top 100	31

1992 year-end chart performance for "Cream"
Chart (1992)	Position
Australia (ARIA)	63
Austria (Ö3 Austria Top 40)	24
New Zealand (RIANZ)	43
Sweden (Topplistan)	92
US Cash Box Top 100	39

== Certifications ==
Certifications for "Cream"
Region	Certification	Certified units/sales
Australia (ARIA)	Platinum	70,000^{^}
United States (RIAA)	Gold	500,000^{^}
^{^} Shipments figures based on certification alone.
