= The Ultimate Live Experience =

1995–96 concert tour by Prince

- Tour by Prince
- Poster to the concerts in Japan
- Location: Europe; Asia; North America
- Associated album: The Gold Experience
- Start date: March 3, 1995
- End date: February 19, 1996
- Legs: 2
- No. of shows: 32 (33 scheduled)

Prince concert chronology
- Interactive Tour (1994); The Ultimate Live Experience (1995–96); Jam of the Year World Tour (1997–98)

The Ultimate Live Experience was a European concert tour by Prince that was mostly in the United Kingdom that was through the month of March 1995. This tour was to promote the soon-to-be The Gold Experience that was released in September later that year. Much of the setlist was from Gold Experience and there was also Come and Exodus material. However, he did say that he wouldn't not perform his Prince stuff from 1978 to early 1993. However, he did perform "I Love U in Me" and "7" with some covers.

An extension of the tour known as the Gold Tour was launched in 1996. The concerts featured mainly songs from the album, but also started adding prior Prince fan favorites.

== History ==
The Ultimate Live Experience was performed during a chaotic period in Prince's life and career. He had much new music written but then record company Warner Brothers refused to release it at the speed that Prince wished, leading to public feuding. Meanwhile, Prince had already released the album Come with no promotion and was trying to get The Gold Experience released as well. During this time, he made many configurations of the album and this tour presents songs that he likely planned for the album (though not all would make the cut), as well as very rarely played cuts from the Prince period, with the exception of "7".

While the previous year's Ultimate Live Experience tour presented Gold Experience prior to its release, the long overdue album had finally hit shelves in late 1995 and this tour was now a "proper" promotion. However, by this time, Prince had been playing some of the material for nearly two years and many of the songs were shortened to brief medleys. Conversely, Prince had formerly said he would not play "Prince" material anymore, but that idea was apparently tossed to the wind with this tour due to contractual agreements made in Japan forcing him to include his older material to the setlist. Several fan-favorites such as "The Cross", "Do Me, Baby", and "Sexy MF" were regulars, along with the Gold material. Also, Prince started performing a cover of Joan Osborne's "One of Us", which he would include on his next album, Emancipation.

== Set lists ==
=== March 1995 ===
1. "Endorphinmachine"
2. "The Jam" (Includes "The Exodus Has Begun" lyric interpolation)
3. "Shhh"
4. "Days of Wild" (Includes snippets of "Hair")
5. "Now" (Includes snippets of "Babies Makin' Babies")
6. "Get Up (I Feel Like Being a) Sex Machine"
7. "Johnny"
8. "The Most Beautiful Girl in the World"
9. "P. Control"
10. "Letitgo"
11. "Pink Cashmere"
12. "(Lemme See Your Body) Get Loose!" (Unreleased remix of "Loose!")
13. "I Love U in Me"
14. "Proud Mary" (Includes "I Can't Turn You Loose" interpolation)
15. Oriental prelude
16. "7"
17. "Dolphin"

Encore

18. "Get Wild"
19. "Race"
20. "Super Hero"
21. Medley
  1. "Billy Jack Bitch"
  2. "Eye Hate U"
  3. "319"
22. "Gold"

=== January to February 1996 ===
1. "Endorphinmachine" (includes "1999" intro)
2. "Shhh"
3. "Days of Wild" (includes snippets of “Hair”)
4. "Now" (includes snippets of “Babies Makin’ Babies)
5. "Get Up (I Feel Like Being a) Sex Machine"
6. "The Most Beautiful Girl in the World"
7. "P. Control" (House Mix)
8. "Letitgo"
9. "Starfish and Coffee"
10. "The Cross"
11. "The Jam"
12. "One of Us"
13. "Do Me, Baby"
14. "Sexy M.F."
15. "If I Was Your Girlfriend"
16. "Vicki Waiting"
17. "Purple Medley"
18. "7"

Encore

19. Medley
  1. "Billy Jack Bitch"
  2. "Eye Hate U"
  3. "319"
20. "Gold"

== Tour dates ==
List of 1995 concerts
Date	City	Country	Venue
March 3, 1995	London	England	Wembley Arena
March 4, 1995	London	England	Wembley Arena
March 5, 1995	London	England	Wembley Arena
March 7, 1995	London	England	Wembley Arena
March 8, 1995	London	England	Wembley Arena
March 10, 1995	Manchester	England	G-Mex Centre
March 11, 1995	Manchester	England	G-Mex Centre
March 13, 1995	Glasgow	Scotland	SECC
March 14, 1995	Glasgow	Scotland	SECC
March 16, 1995	Sheffield	England	Sheffield Arena
March 17, 1995	Sheffield	England	Sheffield Arena
March 18, 1995	Birmingham	England	National Exhibition Centre
March 19, 1995	Birmingham	England	National Exhibition Centre
March 21, 1995	London	England	Wembley Arena
March 22, 1995	London	England	Wembley Arena
March 24, 1995	Den Bosch	Netherlands	Brabanthallen
March 25, 1995	Den Bosch	Netherlands	Brabanthallen
March 27, 1995	Ghent	Belgium	Flanders Expo
March 29, 1995	Dublin	Ireland	Point Depot
March 30, 1995	Dublin	Ireland	Point Depot

List of 1996 concerts
Date	City	Country	Venue
January 8, 1996	Tokyo	Japan	Nippon Budokan
January 9, 1996	Tokyo	Japan	Nippon Budokan
January 11, 1996	Osaka	Japan	Osaka-jō Hall
January 13, 1996	Fukuoka	Japan	Fukuoka Kokusai Center
January 16, 1996	Tokyo	Japan	Nippon Budokan
January 17, 1996	Tokyo	Japan	Nippon Budokan
January 20, 1996	Yokohama	Japan	Yokohama Arena
February 17, 1996	Honolulu	United States	Blaisdell Arena
February 18, 1996	Honolulu	United States	Blaisdell Arena
February 19, 1996	Honolulu	United States	Blaisdell Arena
