= The Beautiful Experience =

EP by Prince
- Released: May 17, 1994
- Recorded: September 1993 – March 1994
- Studio: Paisley Park, Chanhassen
- Genre: Pop
- Length: 32:57
- Label: NPG, Bellmark
- Producer: Prince

Prince chronology
The Hits/The B-Sides (1993)	The Beautiful Experience (1994)	Come (1994)

Singles from The Beautiful Experience
- 1. "The Most Beautiful Girl in the World" Released: February 24, 1994

Professional ratings
Review scores
Source	Rating
AllMusic	2.5/5 stars

The Beautiful Experience is an EP by American musician Prince (his stage name at that time being an unpronounceable symbol, see cover art), his second commercial release under the symbolic moniker. The EP contained seven mixes of the song "The Most Beautiful Girl in the World" in various formats, some with completely new vocals and/or instrumentation. Of particular note is the "Mustang Mix", in which Prince uses his normal singing voice and additional lyrics to give the song a sexual edge. The maxi-single also spawned two singles, "Staxowax" and "Mustang Mix", which were sold commercially in shops to support it.

The EP was released one month after The Beautiful Experience television special (sometimes called A Night in Erotic City) first aired in the United Kingdom on April 3, 1994 on Sky One. Later it was also broadcast in Canada (MuchMusic, April 11, 1994), Spain, the Netherlands and Germany (on April 18, 1994), France (Canal+ on June 18, 1994), Japan (Wowow) and again in the UK in December 1994, this time on Channel 4. The latter three broadcasts omit the post credits video for Beautiful that was in the original broadcast and some scenes with Nona Gaye have a slightly different edit.

The Japanese broadcast of The Beautiful Experience (65:15 minutes) was released as a white label VHS in a plain white sleeve through Prince’s 1-800 New Funk website, along with a white label VHS of The Sacrifice Of Victor, which was also the Japanese version as broadcast by the WowWow channel.

The special was the first of a long line with some 1994 events that Prince dubbed The Love Experience including The Beautiful Experience EP, The Ultimate Live Experience Tour, The Gold Experience album, "The Wild" and "The Hate" experience singles, The Versace Experience, the NPG Records and The Good Life Exodus samplers in 1995, a planned Tora Tora single and Live album that remain unreleased. This idea was also used in 2013 for the digital maxi-single titled The Breakfast Experience.

== Tracks ==
The EP contains six mixes, plus the original single version. "Beautiful" is a thumping dance mix of the song, with entirely new vocals (but same lyrics) recorded. All the songs are almost like a dance mix, in that they are sequenced to sound like one long suite of songs, but can be played separately without confusion. "Staxowax" is more mid-tempo in bpm, with a lot of background layering of vocals. Mayte singing a Prince referencing line from the Salt-N-Pepa song "Shoop", "Like he said, you're a sexy mutha..." (not wanting to call him "Prince"), can be heard throughout this version. The vocals on this track are also rerecorded. "Mustang Mix" is a slower version that has more of an R&B approach to it. The vocals have been rerecorded for this one too, as have the background vocals. There are additional vocals recorded as well, and a spoken section near the end. "Flutestramental" has the same beats as "Mustang Mix" and is more instrumental in nature. The "Shoop" sample can be heard in this mix. Eric Leeds plays flute on this throughout, almost as an adlib, not following the original melody at all. "Sexy Staxophone and Guitar" starts out with a cappella vocals and continues on with a tempo similar to "Mustang Mix". "Mustang Instrumental" has the same basic background as "Mustang Mix", yet starts out with another entirely different a cappella intro. It has a flute sample played by a moog or keyboard throughout. There are some vocals, but they are minimal. There is also a lengthy spoken portion by Nona Gaye. She is "thinking out loud" about what to wear. She has a date later and wants to wear something that will drive her man crazy the moment he lays eyes on her. The EP ends with the original single version of the song.

An alternative cover exists, showing a fold out of Prince's symbol (the same pic as the jacket). When it is folded out, it takes the shape of a butterfly with a woman as the torso.

There are other versions of the song that were released, including "Brian's Mix", which has then-NPG Hornz member Brian Gallagher on saxophone throughout. On the "Get Wild" single, there is another saxophone instrumental featuring Eric Leeds on sax ("Beautiful Girl") that runs 4:40, and is a saxophone solo over the original track. There were also two bonus tracks on the Japanese release, "Beautiful Extended Club Version" and "Sax Mix" (which is the same as "Brian's Mix").

== Chart performance ==
It charted on the UK Singles Chart at number 18 (in the United Kingdom it charted on the singles chart, as it was seen as a 'remix single' rather than an EP or mini-album, with the chart company noting it as a release under 40 minutes with a number of mixes of a featured track), and number 92 on the US Billboard 200.

== Track listing ==
The Beautiful Experience track listing
No.	Title	Length
1.	"Beautiful"	5:56
2.	"Staxowax"	5:14
3.	"Mustang Mix"	6:20
4.	"Flutestramental"	3:36
5.	"Sexy Staxaphone and Guitar"	3:54
6.	"Mustang Instrumental"	3:26
7.	"The Most Beautiful Girl in the World"	4:42

Japan bonus tracks
No.	Title	Length
8.	"Beautiful Extended Club Version"	6:26
9.	"Sax Mix" (also known as "Brian's Mix")	4:32

=== Promo ===
Promo track listing
No.	Title	Length
1.	"Staxowax"	5:00
2.	"Mustang Mix"	6:22
3.	"Brian's Mix"	4:30
4.	"Beautiful"	3:55
5.	"Original Mix"	4:39

== Singles and Hot 100 chart placings ==
- "Staxowax"
1. "Staxowax" – 4:59
2. "Sexy Staxophone and Guitar" – 3:36
- "Mustang Mix"
1. "Mustang Mix" – 6:19
2. "Mustang Instrumental" – 3:23

== Charts ==
The EP charted on both singles and albums charts, depending on the chart rules of the individual country. In Switzerland, the EP charted for one week on the albums chart, then on the singles chart the following week.

Chart performance for The Beautiful Experience
Chart (1994)	Peak position
Australia (ARIA)	14
Austria (Ö3 Austria Top 40)	16
German Albums (Offizielle Top 100)	29
New Zealand (Recorded Music NZ)	47
Spanish Albums (AFYVE)	13
Swedish Albums (Sverigetopplistan)	32
Switzerland (Schweizer Hitparade)	4
Swiss Albums (Schweizer Hitparade)	21
UK Singles (OCC)	18
US Billboard 200	92
