= Jam of the Year World Tour =

1997–1998 concert tour by Prince

- Continental tour by Prince
- Poster to the concert in Greenwood Village, USA. This layout was used for different concert posters
- Location: North America
- Associated album: Emancipation
- Start date: January 7, 1997
- End date: January 22, 1998
- Legs: 4
- No. of shows: 100

Prince concert chronology
- The Ultimate Live Experience (1995–96); Jam of the Year World Tour (1997–98); New Power Soul Tour (1998)

The Jam of the Year World Tour was a concert tour which took place from January 1997 to January 1998 visiting cities all across the United States and Canada. This tour took place in support of Prince's 19th studio album, Emancipation released in November 1996.

This is one of Prince's most notable tours and is also Prince's first tour in North America after he changed his name in 1993.

== Background ==
After wrapping up his performances at the Blaisdell Arena on his Gold Tour to promote his 17th studio album, The Gold Experience, Prince was due to embark on a North American Leg of the tour in March 1996 with The Time, D'Angelo and Tony Rich. However, due to the fact that Prince was working on Emancipation and quickly putting out projects to hurry and get out of his 1992 Warner Bros. deal, he cancelled the tour. He fired everyone from the New Power Generation at the time and made a completely new configuration of the band. In July 1996, Prince released his 18th studio album, Chaos and Disorder which marked to be his final album to complete the requirements under his Warner Bros. contract.

In November 1996, Prince released his 19th studio album Emancipation and announced that he was going on a world tour. He said due to the fact that the Warner Bros. contract doesn't end until December 31, 1999, the tour would continue until the year 2000 so that he wouldn't have to return to the studio. He quickly broke that promise with the release of the de facto Prince album, Newpower Soul by the New Power Generation leading him to change the title of the tour in February 1998.

The world tour was planned to start overseas in Sweden in June 1997 however, all those concerts were cancelled due to reasons unknown. Prince was also supposed to start promo for Emancipation with one-off concerts all across the world planning to come to Brazil, Italy, Germany, England, Spain, France & Netherlands but all further plans were cancelled. Rumors that Prince also planned to headline the 1997 Super Bowl XXXI Halftime Show at the Louisiana Superdome however none of those plans materialized, either.

However, in December 1996, Prince announced that he was going to do public warm-up shows for his band in support of his charity, Love 4 One Another. It was named the Love 4 One Another Charities Tour, and it started on January 7, 1997, at the Tower Theater in Upper Darby Township, Pennsylvania. Tickets went on sale just three days before the first show and sold out almost immediately. All of the proceeds made from the tour went to his charity. In July 1997, almost 2 weeks before the first show of the Jam of the Year World Tour began, tickets were put on sale on July 10 for the first round of shows for the official tour. The first date of the tour started on July 21 in Clarkston, Michigan at the Pine Knob Music Center.

== Set list ==
=== January to June 1997 ===
This set list on represents the show on January 7, 1997 in Upper Darby, this does not represent the setlist for the remainder of the tour.

1. "Jam of the Year"
2. "Talkin' Loud and Sayin' Nothing" (includes "Rock 'N' Roll is Alive! (And It Lives In Minneapolis)" instrumental coda)
3. "Purple Rain"
4. "17 Days"
5. "Get Yo Groove On" (includes an interpolation of "Six")
6. "The Most Beautiful Girl in the World"
7. "Face Down"
8. "The Cross"
9. "One of Us"
10. "Do Me, Baby" (includes snippets of "Adore", "Insatiable", "Scandalous", "How Come U Don't Call Me Anymore?")
11. "Sexy M.F." / "If I Was Your Girlfriend" (includes "♥ or $" instrumental)
12. "The Ride"
13. "How Come U Don't Call Me Anymore?"
14. "Take Me With U" / "Raspberry Beret"
15. "Mr. Happy"
  Encore
16. "Sleep Around"
17. "Johnny"

=== July 1997 to January 1998 ===
This set list on represents the show on July 23, 1997 in Wantagh, this does not represent the setlist for the remainder of the tour.

1. "Jam of the Year"
2. "Talkin' Loud and Sayin' Nothing" (includes "Rock 'N' Roll is Alive! (And It Lives In Minneapolis)" instrumental coda)
3. "Purple Rain"
4. "Little Red Corvette"
5. "Get Yo Groove On" (includes an interpolation of "Six")
6. "The Most Beautiful Girl in the World"
7. "Face Down"(includes "777-9311" instrumental)
8. "The Cross"
9. "One of Us"
10. "Do Me, Baby" (includes snippets of "Adore", "Insatiable", "Scandalous", "How Come U Don't Call Me Anymore?")
11. "Sexy M.F." / "If I Was Your Girlfriend" (includes "♥ or $" instrumental)
12. "How Come U Don't Call Me Anymore?"
13. "Take Me With U" / "Raspberry Beret" (includes "Mr. Happy" instrumental coda)
  Encore
14. "Girls & Boys" / "Erotic City"
15. "Sleep Around"
16. "Baby I'm A Star" / "1999"

== Tour dates ==
List of 1997 concerts, showing date, city, country, venue, tickets sold, number of available tickets and gross revenue
Date	City	Country	Venue	Attendance	Revenue
January 7	Upper Darby Township	United States	Tower Theater	3,006 / 3,006	$150,300
January 8	Boston	United States	Roxy	1,300 / 1,300	N/A
January 10	Washington, D.C.	United States	DAR Constitution Hall	3,700 / 3,700	$13,480
January 11	New York City	United States	Roseland Ballroom	3,000 / 3,000	$150,000
January 13	Detroit	United States	State Theater	3,000 / 3,000	N/A
January 18	Birmingham	United States	Boutwell Memorial Auditorium	6,000 / 6,000	$180,000
January 19	Atlanta	United States	Atlanta Live	2,500 / 2,500	$75,000
February 16	Honolulu	United States	Blaisdell Arena	7,900 / 7,900	$322,583
April 11	Hollywood	United States	Pantages Theatre	2,500 / 2,500	$162,500
April 19	San Jose	United States	Event Center at San Jose University	13,000 / 14,600	$520,000
April 20	San Jose	United States	Event Center at San Jose University	13,000 / 14,600	$520,000
April 28	Phoenix	United States	America West Arena	8,298 / 8,298	$331,920
April 29	San Diego	United States	RIMAC Arena	5,000 / 5,000	$207,500
May 17	Cleveland	United States	CSU Convocation Center	5,000 / 5,000	$200,000
May 18	Louisville	United States	Louisville Gardens	6,800 / 6,800	N/A
June 5	Toronto	Canada	The Warehouse	2,206 / 2,206	$84,225
June 6	Montreal	Canada	Salle Wilfrid-Pelletier	2,980 / 2,980	$142,295
June 21	Moline	United States	The Mark of the Quad Cities	5,207 / 5,207	$182,245
June 22	Noblesville	United States	Deer Creek Music Center	12,201 / 12,201	$369,080
June 27	St. Louis	United States	Kiel Center	13,756 / 13,756	$619,020
June 28	Chicago	United States	United Center	17,943 / 17,943	$1,121,438
July 21	Clarkston	United States	Pine Knob Music Center	14,542 / 14,542	$908,875
July 23	Wantagh	United States	Jones Beach Theater	9,550 / 10,541	$573,000
July 25	Boston	United States	FleetCenter	11,761 / 15,705	$627,253
July 26	Philadelphia	United States	CoreStates Center	12,382 / 14,938	$693,392
August 1	Landover	United States	USAir Arena	15,324 / 15,324	$970,520
August 2	Charlotte	United States	Charlotte Coliseum	20,179 / 20,179	$908,055
August 3	Atlanta	United States	Coca-Cola Lakewood Amphitheatre	14,790 / 15,500	$709,920
August 5	Oklahoma City	United States	Myriad Convention Center	14,460 / 15,283	N/A
August 8	San Antonio	United States	Alamodome	12,882 / 12,882	$837,330
August 9	Dallas	United States	Coca-Cola Starplex Amphitheatre	15,937 / 16,533	$852,630
August 10	Houston	United States	The Summit	14,789 / 14,789	N/A
August 13	Lafayette	United States	Cajundome	9,554 / 10,680	N/A
August 15	Miami	United States	Miami Arena	12,000 / 12,000	N/A
August 18	Raleigh	United States	Hardee's Walnut Creek Amphitheatre	12,193 / 14,000	$589,328
August 20	Jackson	United States	Mississippi Coliseum	5,063 / 5,063	$227,835
August 22	Nashville	United States	Nashville Arena	N/A	N/A
August 23	Memphis	United States	Pyramid Arena	14,423 / 15,978	$697,111
September 13	Buffalo	United States	Marine Midland Arena	15,872 / 15,872	$767,147
September 14	Wallingford	United States	Oakdale Theatre	5,000 / 5,000	$433,333
September 16	Holmdel Township	United States	PNC Bank Arts Center	17,219 / 17,219	$947,045
September 19	Dayton	United States	Ervin J. Nutter Center	N/A	N/A
September 20	Pittsburgh	United States	Civic Arena	N/A	N/A
September 21	Baltimore	United States	Baltimore Arena	N/A	N/A
September 24	Calgary	Canada	Canadian Airlines Saddledome	9,659 / 13,171	$508,160
September 26	Vancouver	Canada	General Motors Place	N/A	N/A
September 27	George	United States	The Gorge Amphitheatre	11,611 / 13,500	$711,173
September 28	Portland	United States	Rose Garden	10,868 / 13,110	$594,117
October 1	Sacramento	United States	ARCO Arena	9,500 / 9,500	$522,500
October 2	Fresno	United States	Selland Arena	7,993 / 9,450	$386,328
October 4	West Valley City	United States	The E Center	N/A	N/A
October 5	Greenwood Village	United States	Fiddler's Green Amphitheatre	16,130 / 16,130	$833,383
October 10	Mountain View	United States	Shoreline Amphitheatre	15,449 / 17,989	$803,348
October 11	Los Angeles	United States	Hollywood Bowl	17,172 / 17,172	$1,167,696
October 12	Irvine	United States	Irvine Meadows Amphitheatre	14,785 / 14,785	$1,002,916
October 24	Las Vegas	United States	MGM Grand Garden Arena	13,766 / 13,766	$1,032,450
October 25	Phoenix	United States	Desert Sky Pavilion	N/A	N/A
October 28	Albuquerque	United States	Tingley Coliseum	N/A	N/A
October 29	Las Cruces	United States	Pan American Center	12,000 / 13,000	N/A
October 31	Mobile	United States	Mobile Civic Center	N/A	N/A
November 2	Austin	United States	Frank Erwin Center	7,108 / 11,282	$331,707
November 4	Columbia	United States	Carolina Coliseum	6,000 / 6,000	$290,000
November 5	Lexington	United States	Rupp Arena	18,976 / 18,976	$887,128
November 6	Knoxville	United States	Thompson-Boling Arena	10,493 / 11,614	$507,162
November 8	Greensboro	United States	Greensboro Coliseum	N/A	N/A
November 9	Cincinnati	United States	The Crown	N/A	N/A
December 8	Fargo	United States	Fargodome	13,114 / 17,000	N/A
December 10	Minneapolis	United States	Target Center	29,000 / 29,000	$957,290
December 11	Minneapolis	United States	Target Center	29,000 / 29,000	$957,290
December 13	Cedar Rapids	United States	Five Seasons Center	6,232 / 8,500	$207,713
December 14	Omaha	United States	Omaha Civic Auditorium	N/A	N/A
December 16	Ames	United States	Hilton Coliseum	N/A	N/A
December 17	Milwaukee	United States	Bradley Center	N/A	N/A
December 18	Grand Rapids	United States	Van Andel Arena	12,076 / 12,076	$414,569
December 27	Auburn Hills	United States	The Palace of Auburn Hills	16,012 / 16,012	$693,799
December 30	Dallas	United States	Reunion Arena	N/A	N/A
December 31	Houston	United States	Compaq Center	14,389 / 15,201	$620,490

List of 1998 concerts, showing date, city, country, venue, tickets sold, number of available tickets and gross revenue
Date	City	Country	Venue	Attendance	Revenue
January 2	New Orleans	United States	Lakefront Arena	7,285 / 7,471	$253,737
January 3	Little Rock	United States	Barton Coliseum	N/A	N/A
January 4	Kansas City	United States	Kemper Arena	N/A	N/A
January 5	Evansville	United States	Roberts Municipal Stadium	8,300 / 10,719	$289,089
January 8	Atlanta	United States	Fox Theater	13,359 / 13,359	$667,905
January 9	Atlanta	United States	Fox Theater	13,359 / 13,359	$667,905
January 10	Atlanta	United States	Fox Theater	13,359 / 13,359	$667,905
January 13	Tampa	United States	Ice Palace	12,494 / 13,000	$408,096
January 22	Oakland	United States	The Arena in Oakland	12,114 / 12,114	$545,130

=== Cancelled dates ===
List of cancelled concerts
Date	City	Country	Venue
January 14, 1997	Pittsburgh	United States	A. J. Palumbo Center
January 15, 1997	Hampton	United States	Hampton Convocation Center
January 17, 1997	Fort Mill	United States	Charlotte Hornets Training Facility
January 20, 1997	Tallahassee	United States	The Moon
January 22, 1997	New Orleans	United States	Saenger Theatre
January 24, 1997	University Park	United States	Moody Coliseum
January 25, 1997	Hattiesburg	United States	University of Southern Mississippi
January 26, 1997	Houston	United States	International Ballroom
May 22, 1997	Montreal	Canada	Molson Centre
May 23, 1997	Ottawa	Canada	National Arts Centre
June 3, 1997	Stockholm	Sweden	Stockholm Olympic Stadium
June 5, 1997	Oslo	Norway	Valle Hovin
June 7, 1997	Berlin	Germany	Friedrich-Ludwig-Jahn-Sportpark
June 10, 1997	London	England	Wembley Stadium
June 12, 1997	Frankfurt	Germany	Waldstadion
June 15, 1997	Dublin	Ireland	Lansdowne Road
August 12, 1997	New Orleans	United States	Lakefront Arena
August 26, 1997	Hampton	United States	Hampton Coliseum
August 27, 1997	Columbus	United States	Polaris Amphitheater
September 9, 1997	Wallingford	United States	Oakdale Theatre
November 21, 1997	Tuscalossa	United States	Coleman Coliseum
December 13, 1997	Rochester	United States	Rochester Community War Memorial
December 28, 1997	Baton Rouge	United States	Riverside Centroplex
December 29, 1997	Shreveport	United States	Hirsch Memorial Coliseum
January 6, 1998	Valley Center	United States	Kansas Coliseum
January 8, 1998	Fort Wayne	United States	War Memorial Coliseum
January 9, 1998	Charleston	United States	Charleston Civic Center
January 15, 1998	Albany	United States	Pepsi Arena
January 16, 1998	Worcester	United States	Worcester's Centrum Centre
January 21, 1998	Las Vegas	United States	MGM Grand Garden Arena
January 24, 1998	San Diego	United States	Cox Arena
