= 1-800-NEW-FUNK =

Compilation album by various artists
- Released: July 20, 1994
- Genres: Funk New jack swing, hip hop soul
- Length: 46:08
- Label: NPG
- Producer: Prince

Professional ratings
Review scores
Source	Rating
Entertainment Weekly	C+
Music Week	4/5 stars

1-800-NEW-FUNK is a compilation album by Prince's NPG Records, meant to showcase artists signed to the record label. It was released on July 20, 1994. The title of the album was also a toll-free phone number in North America for customers to purchase Prince-related merchandise. Some tracks are from albums that actually saw release either through Prince's previous label, Paisley Park Records or through NPG Records, while others appear only on this compilation.

There were two German releases to this CD; the first release was issued with the reference NPG 6051-2 and is missing artwork from the Steeles album in the liner notes. The second release, reference 0060512NPG, includes an image of the Steeles album cover artwork.

== Track listing ==
No.	Title	Performing Artist(s)	Length
1.	"MPLS"	Minneapolis	4:27
2.	"Hollywood" (From the album Hey Man, Smell My Finger)	George Clinton	4:33
3.	"Love Sign"	Nona Gaye and Prince	4:32
4.	"If Love U 2nite" (From the album Child of the Sun)	Mayte	4:20
5.	"Color"	The Steeles	4:20
6.	"2gether" (From the album Gold Nigga)	The N.P.G.	5:07
7.	"Standing at the Altar"	Margie Cox	3:55
8.	"You Will be Moved" (From the album The Voice)	Mavis Staples	4:12
9.	"17"	Madhouse	5:24
10.	"A Woman's Gotta Have It"	Nona Gaye	4:30
11.	"MPLS Reprise"	Minneapolis	0:48
Total length:			46:08

== Singles ==
- The Nona Gaye/Prince track "Love Sign" was released to radio in June 1994.
- Margie Cox's "Standing at the Altar" was also released as a single.

== Reviews ==
Entertainment Weekly said that as a showcase of Prince's label, Paisley Park Records, the album "amounts to unintentional evidence of why the company failed." They rated the album "C+". The Independent, describing the record as a "stop-gap compilation of Princely offshoots", cited Nona Gaye's contributions as being "of primary interest", saying she "displays a slinky sensitivity without the overt sensuality of her father or her producer".
