= The Versace Experience: Prelude 2 Gold =

- 2019 re-release cover

Mixtape by Prince
- Released: July 8, 1995
- Length: 32:43
- Label: NPG; Legacy
- Producer: Prince

Prince chronology
The Black Album (1994)	The Versace Experience: Prelude 2 Gold (1995)	The Gold Experience (1995)

The Versace Experience: Prelude 2 Gold is a mixtape by American musician Prince, originally issued as a limited edition promotional cassette and given away to attendees of the Versace collection at the 1995 Paris Fashion Week. The album was intended to promote Prince's then-upcoming album The Gold Experience.

The cassette was re-released posthumously for Record Store Day on April 13, 2019, and released on CD, vinyl, as a digital download and for streaming through NPG Records and Legacy Recordings on September 13, 2019.

== Music ==
The cassette was issued in promotion of Prince's 1995 album The Gold Experience and half of the included tracks are excerpts or mixes of songs which were later released on that album: "Pussy Control", "Shhh", "Eye Hate U", "319", "Shy", "Billy Jack Bitch" and "Gold". However, several were originally written for the New Power Generation's second album Exodus (1995), as well as his collaborations with Clare Fischer (issued as "the New Power Generation Orchestra"), and his jazz fusion group Madhouse.

== Track listing ==
No.	Title	Performer	Length
1.	"Pussy Control" (Club Mix; edit)		3:02
2.	"Shhh" (X-cerpt)		3:54
3.	"Get Wild in the House"	The New Power Generation	2:14
4.	"Eye Hate U" (Remix)		3:28
5.	"319" (X-cerpt)		1:28
6.	"Shy" (X-cerpt)		2:22
7.	"Billy Jack Bitch"		2:31
8.	"Sonny T." (X-cerpt)	Prince and Madhouse	0:28
9.	"Rootie Kazootie"	Prince and Madhouse	2:37
10.	"Chatounette Controle"		2:24
11.	"Pussy Control (Control Tempo)" (edit)		1:23
12.	"Kamasutra Overture #5"	The New Power Generation Orchestra	0:43
13.	"Free the Music"	The New Power Generation	1:44
14.	"Segue"		0:49
15.	"Gold" (X-cerpt)		3:36
Total length:			32:43

== Charts ==
Chart performance for The Versace Experience: Prelude 2 Gold
Chart (2019)	Peak position
Austrian Albums (Ö3 Austria)	50
Belgian Albums (Ultratop Flanders)	19
Belgian Albums (Ultratop Wallonia)	61
Dutch Albums (Album Top 100)	29
French Albums (SNEP)	94
German Albums (Offizielle Top 100)	59
Japanese Albums (Oricon)	25
Scottish Albums (OCC)	38
Spanish Albums (PROMUSICAE)	20
Swiss Albums (Schweizer Hitparade)	30
UK Albums (OCC)	83
US Billboard 200	170
US Top R&B Albums (Billboard)	17
