= New Power Soul =

New Power Soul is a title used several times by the American musician Prince. It may refer to:

- Newpower Soul, a 1998 de facto Prince album credited to the New Power Generation
- New Power Soul Tour, a 1998 concert tour supporting the above album
- "New Power Soul", a song on the 1995 New Power Generation album Exodus

== See also ==
- The New Power Generation, Prince's backing group from 1990 to 2009.
