= Come (album) =

Studio album by Prince
- Released: August 16, 1994
- Recorded: 1991; January–May 1993; March 1994
- Studios: Paisley Park, Chanhassen; Record Plant, Los Angeles; Larrabee, North Hollywood
- Genres: R&B; funk; hip hop; urban
- Length: 48:43
- Label: Warner Bros.
- Producer: Prince

Prince chronology
The Beautiful Experience (1994)	Come (1994)	The Black Album (1994)

Singles from Come
- 1. "Letitgo" Released: August 9, 1994; 2. "Space" Released: November 1, 1994

Professional ratings
Initial reviews (in 1994)
Review scores
Source	Rating
Billboard	(favorable)
Robert Christgau	(3-star Honorable Mention)
Knoxville News Sentinel	2/5 stars
Mojo	(mixed)
Music Week	4/5 stars
NME	7/10
Rolling Stone	2/5 stars
Select	2/5 medals
Village Voice	(unfavorable)

Professional ratings
Retrospective reviews (after 1994)
Review scores
Source	Rating
AllMusic	2/5 stars
Mojo	(favorable)
MusicHound	1.5/5
The Rolling Stone Album Guide	2.5/5 stars

Come is the fifteenth studio album by American recording artist Prince. It was released on August 16, 1994, by Warner Bros. Records.

At the time of the album's release, Prince was in a public dispute with Warner Bros. A lack of promotion from the label and from Prince himself resulted in Come under-performing on American record charts, stalling at No. 15, and becoming his first album since Controversy (1981) to not yield any top 10 singles in the US. However, it was more successful overseas, reaching the top 10 across Europe and topping the UK Albums Chart.

The album would be Prince's final Warner Bros. album under his name. For the remainder of his contract with the company, his name would be represented by the unpronounceable "Love Symbol", and he would be referred to in the media as "The Artist Formerly Known as Prince".

== Concept evolution ==
After Prince's name-change to an unpronounceable symbol in 1993, he intended to release new songs under that moniker in formats other than albums. He would fulfill his contract to Warner Bros. by delivering unreleased material from his music vault. Prince conceived an "interactive musical experience" called Glam Slam Ulysses—a musical loosely based on Homer's Odyssey. These songs and many others would travel back and forth between different projects, including a planned triple-album called The Dawn. Material from this era later ended up on Come, The Gold Experience and The Beautiful Experience, among other projects.

In late May 1993, Prince's then-band member Mayte Garcia sent a letter to a Prince fanzine listing the tracks "Come", "Endorphinmachine", "Space", "Pheromone", "Loose!", "Papa", "Dark", "Race", "Solo" and "Poem", which all ended up being included in some form on Come. She also included "Interactive", "Peach" and "Pope". Most of these songs were newly written, except "Peach" (written in 1992), and "Race" (written in 1991 during the Love Symbol Album sessions—it uses a scratching sound effect similar to Love Symbol Album's "The Continental").

On March 6, 1994, Prince submitted a tape of eight songs to Dutch radio stations which included the song "Pheromone". Five days later, he submitted the first version of the Come album to Warner Bros. The album consisted of: "Poem", "Interactive", "Endorphinemachine", "Space", "Pheromone", "Loose!", "Papa", "Race", "Dark", "Solo", and "Strays of the World". This version of the album is exactly 45 minutes in length and is known as the Come Test Pressing. The title track was absent. Warner Bros. rejected this version, and asked for the title track along with some other new material, such as the recent hit "The Most Beautiful Girl in the World". Prince went back into the studio and tooled with the title track, creating an 11-minute horn-boosted sexual romp.

With these additions, Warner Bros. agreed to release the album. But Prince decided to change it once again, removing the more rock-oriented tracks "Interactive", "Endorphinemachine", and "Strays of the World." He also broke up "Poem" into segues throughout the album, with the remainder retitled as "Orgasm", and included the newly written "Letitgo". This final version was submitted to Warner Bros. on the same day as a configuration of The Gold Experience. Prince wanted them to release both albums simultaneously, so the Prince material would compete with the one released under the symbolic moniker in the charts (with the latter having more commercial material). Warner Bros. accepted both albums, but refused to release them both at the same time, fearing the market would have too much Prince material in stock.

== Recording ==
Most of the songs from the Come album were recorded at Paisley Park Studios and The Record Plant in early 1993 during a highly prolific time for Prince. The guitar sound on "Orgasm" is a sample of a feedback guitar solo from a previous Prince track, "Private Joy," from his 1981 album Controversy. The moaning on "Orgasm" is that of Vanity, recorded in 1983 for the unreleased track "Vibrator." In the liner notes, Vanity is credited as "she knows".

== Music and lyrics ==
Lyrically, the album depicts overt and sexual themes through tracks like "Come" and "Pheromone", accompanied by a light touch of seduction on "Space". The song "Papa" also touches on child abuse and neglect. "Race" is reminiscent to Prince's predecessor, Diamonds and Pearls (1991), with "pointed social commentary that aims to unify us all under one race rather than segregate".

"Come" continues to blend hip-hop through tracks like "Loose!" and "Race". It also shares stripped back moments on the record like "Dark". The album also incorporates other elements of pop, R&B, and funk.

== Album cover ==
The album cover photo was taken in front of the Sagrada Família in Barcelona. Outtakes from the photoshoot were included in the 1994 book Prince Presents: The Sacrifice of Victor. The cover also proclaims "Prince: 1958–1993", indicating that the "Prince" identity had symbolically died in 1993 and had been reborn under the new Love Symbol alias.

== Post-release and reception ==
Upon release, Come received little support from Prince, who derided the album as "old material", despite the fact that many of the tracks had been recorded during the same sessions that produced The Gold Experience. Since Prince placed the more up-tempo and commercial material from these sessions on The Gold Experience, the overall tone of Come is somewhat dark and experimental in nature. Despite Prince's apparent marketing neglect, Come performed moderately well, reaching number 15 in the United States, going gold and receiving heavy R&B airplay with the single "Letitgo". In the United Kingdom, the album was a huge hit, debuting at number 1. Prince also released two maxi singles in support of the album.

In 1993, a funkier instrumental version of the song "Pheromone" was used as the theme music for the BET music video program Video LP.

== Track listing ==
All songs written and composed by Prince; except where noted

Come track listing
No.	Title	Lyrics	Length
1.	"Come"		11:13
2.	"Space"		4:28
3.	"Pheromone"		5:08
4.	"Loose!"		3:26
5.	"Papa"		2:48
6.	"Race"		4:28
7.	"Dark"		6:10
8.	"Solo"	David Henry Hwang	3:48
9.	"Letitgo"		5:32
10.	"Orgasm"		1:39

Promotional vinyl bonus tracks:

11. "Space" (Universal Love Remix) – 6:10 (singing different lyrics than the album track)
12. "Space" (Funky Stuff Remix) – 5:42
13. "Letitgo" (QDIII Instrumental Mix) – 5:00 (retitled "Instrumental" for single release)
14. "Letitgo" (J-Sw!ft #3 Instrumental) – 5:43 (retitled "(-) Sherm Stick Edit" for single release)

== Personnel ==
Adapted from Benoît Clerc

=== Musicians ===
- Prince – lead vocals (tracks 1–9), spoken vocals (tracks 3, 10), rap (track 6), backing vocals (tracks 1–7, 9), electric guitar (tracks 4–6, 9–10), acoustic guitar (track 7), bass (tracks 1, 3–4, 6), drums (track 3–4), percussion (tracks 1, 6), finger snapping (track 2), tambourine (track 9), programming (tracks 1–6, 9), synthesizers (tracks 1–6, 8–10)
- Brian Gallagher – tenor saxophone (tracks 1, 6–7, 9)
- Dave Jensen, Steve Strand – trumpet (tracks 1, 6–7, 9)
- Kathy Jensen – baritone saxophone (tracks 1, 6–7, 9)
- Michael B. Nelson – trombone (tracks 1, 6–7, 9)
- Tommy Barbarella – synthesizers (track 2, 7, 9)
- Michael B. – drums (tracks 2, 5, 7, 9)
- Mr. Hayes – synthesizers (tracks 2, 9), Hammond organ (track 7)
- Sonny T. – bass (tracks 2, 5, 7, 9)
- Mayte – backing vocals (track 6)
- Jearlyn Steele Battle – looped sample ("Face the Music") (track 6)
- Kathleen Bradford – vocals (track 9), backing vocals (track 9)
- Eric Leeds – transverse flute (track 9)
- Ricky Peterson – additional synthesizers (track 9)
- Vanity – vocalizations (track 9), moans (track 10)

=== Technical ===
- Prince – producer
- David "Chronic Freeze" Friedlander, Ray Hahnfeldt, Tom Tucker – recording engineers
- Xanex Bess, Tom Garneau, Kimm James – assistant recording engineers

== Charts ==
=== Weekly charts ===
Weekly chart performance for Come
Chart (1994)	Peak position
Australian Albums (ARIA)	2
Austrian Albums (Ö3 Austria)	4
Dutch Albums (Album Top 100)	4
Finnish Albums (Suomen virallinen lista)	8
German Albums (Offizielle Top 100)	9
New Zealand Albums (RMNZ)	16
Norwegian Albums (VG-lista)	7
Spanish Albums (AFYVE)	7
Swedish Albums (Sverigetopplistan)	7
Swiss Albums (Schweizer Hitparade)	4
UK Albums (Official Charts)	1
US Billboard 200	15
US Top R&B/Hip-Hop Albums (Billboard)	2

2023 weekly chart performance for Come
Chart (2023)	Peak position
Belgian Albums (Ultratop Wallonia)	167

=== Year-end charts ===
Year-end chart performance for Come
Chart (1994)	Position
Dutch Albums (Album Top 100)	97
US Top R&B/Hip-Hop Albums (Billboard)	97

=== Singles and Hot 100 chart placings ===
- "Letitgo" (#31 US, #10 US R&B)
- "Space" (#71 US R&B)

== Certifications ==
Certifications for Come
Region	Certification	Certified units/sales
France (SNEP)	Gold	100,000^{*}
Spain (Promusicae)	Gold	50,000^{^}
United Kingdom (BPI)	Gold	100,000^{^}
United States (RIAA)	Gold	500,000^{^}
^{*} Sales figures based on certification alone.^{^} Shipments figures based on certification alone.
