= The War (The New Power Generation song) =

1998 single by The New Power Generation

- Cassette single

Single by The New Power Generation
- Released: July 21, 1998
- Recorded: June 20, 1998
- Studio: Paisley Park, Chanhassen, Minnesota, United States
- Genre: Psychedelia; funk
- Length: 26:00
- Label: NPG Records
- Songwriter: Prince
- Producer: Prince

The New Power Generation singles chronology
| "Girl 6" (1996) | "The War" (1998) | "Come On" (1998) |

"The War" is a song by The New Power Generation, headed by Prince, who was going by the unpronounceable "Love Symbol" at the time. The song was initially given away to customers who pre-ordered Prince's Crystal Ball album and experienced delivery troubles. The song was released only as a single. It was also available as a music download on Prince's now defunct website, the NPG Music Club. A promo CD single of The War was also available for purchase through 1-800-New-Funk and online.

The original 45 minute jam was edited down to 26 minutes. The song mostly uses distorted guitars and synthesizers. Prince encourages the audience to chant throughout "The Evolution will be colorized", which makes reference to Gil Scott-Heron's poem/song "The Revolution Will Not Be Televised". The lyrics are sermon-like, warning against harmful technology and the forecoming of the Apocalypse.
