= Count the Days =

Count the Days may refer to:

- "Count the Days" (Al Wilson song), a 1979 song by Al Wilson
- "Count the Days", song by Kylie Minogue from Rhythm of Love
- "Count the Days", song by the New Power Generation from Exodus
- "I'll Count the Days", song by Rebecca Ferguson
- "Count the Days", a 1996 EP by Citizen King
