= Girl 6 (disambiguation) =

Girl 6 may refer to:

- Girl 6, a 1996 film by Spike Lee
- Girl 6 (album), the soundtrack for the film, composed by Prince
- “Girl 6” (song), the title song for the soundtrack
