= Get Wild =

Single by the New Power Generation

from the album Exodus
- Released: 1995
- Recorded: May 15, 1994
- Studio: Paisley Park, Chanhassen, Minnesota, US
- Genre: Pop, funk
- Length: 4:32 (album version); 4:51 (single mix)
- Label: NPG
- Songwriter: The New Power Generation
- Producer: The New Power Generation

The New Power Generation singles chronology
"2gether" (1993)	"Get Wild" (1995)	"Count the Days" (1994)

"Get Wild" is a song by the New Power Generation, and the first single from their 1995 album Exodus. The song was a hit in the UK, reaching number 19 on the UK Singles Chart.

"Get Wild" is a funk song in the style of Parliament and Funkadelic. The lead vocals are by Sonny T., with Prince delivering a rap during the bridge and some Spanish vocals provided by Mayte. A maxi-single was released with several remixes of the song.

A remix of "Get Wild" was played in the 1994 film Prêt-à-Porter and was included on the soundtrack album. A video featuring cameo scenes with Lolly Pop and various others was shot at Glam Slam Minneapolis, but was shelved by Warner Bros.

Prince's rap from "Get Wild" was later reused in a promotional remix of the Gold Experience track "P. Control".

The B-side of the single was another album track, the psychedelic "Hallucination Rain". This mid-tempo track is mainly spoken but builds into a soaring crescendo of noise and thundering drums in which Prince's voice can be clearly heard at the end. The single also includes the song "Beautiful Girl", a remix of Prince's 1994 hit "The Most Beautiful Girl in the World".

In 1995, Prince released a perfume called "Get Wild", inspired by the song. It was sold through Prince's mail order retail outlet and New Power Generation stores until 1999. In June 1995, author Jackie Collins sued Prince, claiming he copied the name and design from her own "Wild!" fragrance.

== Track listing ==
=== CD single: NPG 61045 ===
1. "Get Wild" (Single Mix) – 4:35
2. "Beautiful Girl" – 4:40
3. "Hallucination Rain" – 5:52

=== CD Maxi-single: NPG 6119-5 ===
1. "Get Wild" (Money Maker) – 6:01
2. "Get Wild" (Kirky J's Get Wild)" – 6:38
3. "Get Wild" (Club Mix) – 5:04
4. "Get Wild" (Get Wild in the House) – 6:14
5. "Get Wild" – 4:33
6. "Get Wild" (Money Maker Funky Jazz Mix) – 6:20

== Charts ==
Chart performance for "Get Wild"
Chart (1995)	Peak position
UK Singles (Official Charts)	19
