= Gold Tour =

Gold Tour can be the name of two tours

- Gold Tour (Steps)
- Gold Tour (Prince)
