= Come 2 My House =

1998 studio album by Chaka Khan

Studio album by Chaka Khan
- Released: July 21, 1998
- Length: 59:51
- Label: NPG
- Producer: Chaka Khan; Prince; Howard McCrary; Robert D. Palmer; Ricky Peterson

Chaka Khan chronology
| Epiphany: The Best of Chaka Khan, Vol. 1 (1996) | Come 2 My House (1998) | Dance Classics of Chaka Khan (1999) |

Singles from Come 2 My House
- 1. "Spoon" Released: 1998; 2. "Don't Talk 2 Strangers" Released: 1998

Come 2 My House is the ninth studio album by American R&B/funk singer Chaka Khan released on the NPG Records label in 1998.

Come 2 My House was Khan's first full-length album since 1992's The Woman I Am, due to the Warner Bros. Records label postponing and eventually canceling the release of her tenth album Dare You to Love Me (1995).

== Overview ==
The album included two single releases; "Spoon" (originally called "Am Happy?") and "Don't Talk 2 Strangers" – neither of which charted. The album, however, made a brief appearance on Billboard's R&B Albums chart, peaking at number 49.

After first covering Prince's 1979 ballad "I Feel for You" on her 1984 album of the same name and turning it into a sample-heavy hip-hop anthem and a million-selling hit single, then recording his "Sticky Wicked" (produced by Prince himself) and "Eternity" on her 1988 album CK, followed by the recording of the track "Pain" with Prince for the Dare You to Love Me album in 1995 and earlier in 1998 appearing with both Prince and legendary bassist and composer Larry Graham (Sly & The Family Stone, Graham Central Station) to promote each of their CD's on the independent NPG label, Khan and Prince finally teamed up for their first full-length project together; Come 2 My House.

While Prince co-produced all tracks but one and also helped write ten of the songs, even two of them solo, the set was very much a team effort. As Khan pointed out in the liner notes, Come 2 My House was a different album for her because it was the first time that she was not only the producer but had also composed or co-written the majority of the songs on one of her albums. During most of her career she had with a few exceptions on select albums recorded either songs written especially for her or cover versions. On Come 2 My House no less than ten out of thirteen tracks were new compositions penned by herself, either with Prince or Larry Graham, other longtime collaborators such as vocalists Mark Stevens and Sandra St. Victor, Robert D. Palmer, Howard McCrary or The New Power Generation member Kirk Johnson. Two of the songs were, however, cover versions; Prince's "Don't Talk 2 Strangers" from 1996's Girl 6 soundtrack and Graham Central Station's classic hit "Hair" from their eponymous 1974 album.

Among the musicians contributing were several members of The New Power Generation, including vocalist Marva King, keyboardist Kirk Johnson, bassist Rhonda Smith, drummer/percussionist Michael Bland, the horn section Hornheadz (previously known as the NPG Hornz) as well as Prince's former wife Mayte Garcia. Rapper Queen Latifah made a special guest appearance on "Pop My Clutch".

== Critical reception ==
Professional ratings
Review scores
| Source | Rating |
|---|---|
| AllMusic | 3/5 stars |
| Rolling Stone | 3/5 stars |

Despite receiving glowing reviews and wide variety – the album's funk, smooth ballads, gospel, hip-hop and bass-heavy beats were combined with Khan's lyrics, which were both seductive,(title track), spiritual, political ("Democrazy"), autobiographical ("This Crazy Life Of Mine"), provocative and humorous (I'll never open my legs again/to a man who's insecure, from "Never B Another Fool") – the Come 2 My House project was met with general indifference by musical audiences and is often regarded as Khan's second lost album.

Criminally overlooked upon its release, 1998 saw Chaka Khan shine on Come 2 My House. For the longtime fan of both Khan and Prince, maturing through the years, this is music that delights both in its familiarity and consistency. Amidst the midtempo groove of "Spoon," Chaka Khan concurs: "U are just like my favorite spoon/cuz U stir me up." Come 2 My House will stir up anyone delighted by these pros in the past.

— Jonathan Druy, AllMusic

Her voice is an instrument of knowingness, carnality, spirituality and intellect. On Come 2 My House...the voice is better than ever. If melted caramel had a sound, this would be it: rich, thick, warm and enveloping.

— Ernest Hardy, Rolling Stone

== Commercial performance ==
As of 2005 it has sold 76,000 copies in United States according to Nielsen SoundScan.

== Track listing ==
1. "Come 2 My House" (Khan, Prince, Howard McCrary, Robert D. Palmer) – 4:46
2. "This Crazy Life of Mine" (Khan, Prince) – 2:33
3. "Betcha " (Khan, Prince, Mark Stevens) – 4:30
4. "Spoon" (Khan, Howard McCrary, Robert D. Palmer) – 3:50
5. "Pop My Clutch" (Kirk Johnson, Khan, Prince) – 4:47
6. "Journey 2 the Center of Your Heart" (Prince) – 4:16
7. "'ll Never B Another Fool" (Khan, Prince, Sandra St. Victor) – 4:13
8. "Democrazy" (Khan, Prince) – 6:08
9. " Remember U" (Larry Graham, Khan, Prince) – 4:16
10. "Reconsider (U Betta)" (Khan, Prince) – 4:23
11. "Don't Talk 2 Strangers" (Prince) – 3:16
12. "Hair" (Larry Graham) – 5:45
13. "The Drama" (Kirk Johnson, Khan) – 6:36

== Personnel ==
=== Musicians ===
- Chaka Khan – vocals
- Robert D. Palmer – vocals
- Kirk Johnson – vocals
- Queen Latifah – rap vocals
- Prince – guitar, background vocals
- Mike Scott – acoustic guitar
- Kathy Jensen – saxophone
- Walter Chancellor Jr. – saxophone
- The Hornheadz – horns
- David (Dave) Jensen – trumpet
- Ricky Peterson – keyboards
- Larry Graham – bass guitar, background vocals
- Rhonda Smith – bass
- Michael Bland – drums
- Mayte Garcia – finger cymbals
- Brother Jules – scratches
- Chanté Moore – background vocals

=== Production ===
- Chaka Khan – record producer (tracks 1–14)
- Prince – record producer (tracks 1–4 and 6–14)
- Howard McCrary – producer (track 5)
- Robert D. Palmer – producer (track 5)
- Ricky Peterson – additional production (tracks 3, 9 and 11)
- Hans-Martin Buff - recording and mixing engineer
- Tom Tucker - mixing engineer (tracks 3, 9 and 11)

== Charts ==
Chart performance for Come 2 My House
| Chart (1998–1999) | Peak position |
|---|---|
| US Top R&B/Hip-Hop Albums (Billboard) | 49 |
