= Jam of the Year =

Jam of the Year may refer to:

- Jam of the Year Rebel Army Radio
- "Jam of the Year", Prince song from Emancipation (Prince album)
- Jam of the Year Tour, Prince
