= Chaos and Disorder =

Studio album by Prince
- Released: July 9, 1996
- Recorded: May 1993; October 1993; late 1994; late 1995 – early 1996; February–April 1996
- Genres: Funk rock; hard rock; pop rock
- Length: 39:13
- Label: Warner Bros.
- Producer: Prince

Prince chronology
| Girl 6 (1996) | Chaos and Disorder (1996) | Emancipation (1996) |

Singles from Chaos and Disorder
- 1. "Dinner with Delores" Released: July 8, 1996

Professional ratings
Review scores
| Source | Rating |
|---|---|
| AllMusic | 3/5 stars |
| Christgau's Consumer Guide | A− |
| Entertainment Weekly | C+ |
| The Guardian | 3/5 stars |
| NME | 2/10 |
| Q | 3/5 stars |
| Rolling Stone | 2/5 stars |
| The Rolling Stone Album Guide | 3.5/5 stars |
| Select | 1/5 |
| Tom Hull | B+ |

Chaos and Disorder is the eighteenth studio album by American musician Prince. It was released on July 9, 1996, by Warner Bros. Records. The album reached number 26 in the United States—his poorest performance with an album of new material since his debut album For You—and number 14 in the United Kingdom. Prince refused to promote the album, still engaged in his fight against his Warner Bros. contract, and it was released simply to fulfill his contractual obligations. The inlay sleeve carries the message: "Originally intended 4 private use only, this compilation serves as the last original material recorded by (love symbol) 4 warner brothers records - may you live 2 see the dawn".

The single "Dinner with Delores" was released in the United Kingdom only, and despite the low-key promotion, became a Top 40 hit, albeit a minor one by his previous standards. Despite having been out of print for years, the album was released digitally on Tidal in 2016, and on iTunes in 2018. It was reissued on CD and vinyl in September 2019. The inlay sleeve shows a bloody hypodermic needle with a dollar bill inside it, and a human heart sitting in a toilet bowl.

== Production, release and re-appraisal ==
While Prince insisted that the album "was done very quickly", and that they were "seeing how fast and hard we could thrash it out", more than a third of it dates back to sessions for The Gold Experience and Come. It also marked the return of Rosie Gaines, who sang on five songs, and Michael B. and Sonny T., in what were to be their last sessions as regular New Power Generation members. A re-appraisal of the album after Prince's death lauded it as "a rocker with moments of some of Prince's finest guitar playing." Another described it as a "tightly-focused, grunge-oriented rock-funk collection" where "the grit and punch of the musicianship is what gives the album its overall raw edge". The Village Voice critic Robert Christgau wrote in his review that, "anybody expecting a kissoff or a throwaway radically underestimates his irrepressible musicality. Apropos of nothing, here's a guitar album for your earhole, enhanced by a fresh if not shocking array of voices and trick sounds and cluttered now and then by horns." At the time of its release, Prince told the Los Angeles Times: "I was bitter before, but now I've washed my face. I can just move on. I'm free."

== Warner Bros. contract ==
"We've come to a point where we feel that if he's happier somewhere else, we don't have any beef with him."

— Bob Merlis, senior vice president of publicity at Warner Bros.

After Chaos and Disorder it was 18 years before Prince released another album on Warner Bros., 2014's Plectrumelectrum, under a deal which gave back Prince control of his masters, the absence of which on his original contract had been a source of considerable acrimony.

== Track listing ==
All songs written by Prince.

Chaos and Disorder track listing
| No. | Title | Length |
|---|---|---|
| 1. | "Chaos and Disorder" | 4:19 |
| 2. | "I Like It There" | 3:15 |
| 3. | "Dinner with Delores" | 2:46 |
| 4. | "The Same December" | 3:24 |
| 5. | "Right the Wrong" | 4:39 |
| 6. | "Zannalee" | 2:43 |
| 7. | "I Rock, Therefore I Am" | 6:15 |
| 8. | "Into the Light" | 2:46 |
| 9. | "I Will" | 3:37 |
| 10. | "Dig U Better Dead" | 3:59 |
| 11. | "Had U" | 1:26 |

== Singles ==
- "Dinner with Delores" (#36 UK)

== Charts ==
Chart performance for Chaos and Disorder
| Chart (1996) | Peak position |
|---|---|
| Australian Albums (ARIA) | 54 |
| Austrian Albums (Ö3 Austria) | 17 |
| Belgian Albums (Ultratop Flanders) | 24 |
| Belgian Albums (Ultratop Wallonia) | 47 |
| Danish Albums (Hitlisten) | 39 |
| Dutch Albums (Album Top 100) | 8 |
| Finnish Albums (Suomen virallinen lista) | 31 |
| French Albums (SNEP) | 25 |
| German Albums (Offizielle Top 100) | 42 |
| Norwegian Albums (VG-lista) | 15 |
| Swedish Albums (Sverigetopplistan) | 32 |
| Swiss Albums (Schweizer Hitparade) | 21 |
| UK Albums (Official Charts) | 14 |
| US Billboard 200 | 26 |
