= Don't Talk 2 Strangers =

1992 song by Prince

Song by Prince

from the album Girl 6
- Published: 1992
- Released: 1996
- Recorded: 1992
- Length: 3:11
- Label: Warner Bros.
- Songwriter: Prince
- Producer: Prince

"Don't Talk 2 Strangers" is a song by Prince, released on his 1996 album Girl 6, the soundtrack to the Spike Lee film of the same name. Vibe magazine claimed the song was "the album's only disappointment". Prince recorded the song in 1992, during sessions for the proposed soundtrack to the film, I'll Do Anything.

"Don't Talk 2 Strangers"

Single by Chaka Khan

from the album Come 2 My House
- Released: 1998
- Recorded: 1998
- Genre: R&B, funk, dance-pop
- Length: 3:25
- Songwriter: Prince
- Producer: Prince

== Chaka Khan version ==
Chaka Khan released a cover of "Don't Talk 2 Strangers" which was a hit in 1998. The video featured Khan's mother, daughter Milini, granddaughter Raeven, and nephew Tallon. It was the second hit single from her album Come 2 My House. The song featured on the soundtrack of the 1998 film, Down in the Delta.
