= Purple Medley =

Single by Prince

- US 12" single

Single by Prince
- B-side: "Kirk J's B-Sides Remix"
- Released: March 14, 1995
- Recorded: 1989–1995
- Studio: Paisley Park, Chanhassen
- Genre: Pop, funk, rock
- Length: 3:14 (7" edit); 11:00 (12" full version)
- Label: Warner Bros.
- Songwriter: Prince
- Producer: Prince

Prince singles chronology
"Space" (1994)	"Purple Medley" (1995)	" Hate U" (1995)

"Purple Medley" is a medley of songs by American musician Prince from 1995. There is no album accompanying the single. The track is a mix of many hits and well-known songs from Prince's career. Some of the pieces of music are samples, while others are re-recorded for the mix. Some of the additional instrumentation is credited to The New Power Generation. The "Purple Medley" consists of snippets from the songs: "Batdance", "When Doves Cry", "Kiss", "Erotic City", "Darling Nikki", "1999", "Baby I'm a Star", "Diamonds and Pearls", "Purple Rain" and "Let's Go Crazy" and fades for the edit. The full version continues with "Sexy Dancer", "Let's Work", "Irresistible Bitch" (with the music of "Sexy MF"), "I Wanna Be Your Lover", "Alphabet St.", "Thieves in the Temple", the bassline to The Time's "777-9311", Sheila E.'s "A Love Bizarre", "If I Was Your Girlfriend", "Raspberry Beret", "Little Red Corvette", "Cream" and "Peach".

The CD single release includes both the full version of the medley (which clocks in at 11 minutes) and the edited version, which is 3:14 in length, and omits about half of the tracks present in the full version. Despite, in essence, being a megamix of Prince's biggest hits (barring "The Most Beautiful Girl in the World"), the B-side of the single is "Kirk J's B-Sides Remix" which consists of additional Prince hits remixed by band member Kirk Johnson. The compilation includes bits of "Pop Life", "Housequake", "When Doves Cry", "Shockadelica", "Head" and "The Continental". The remix of "The Continental" was released in a longer version on the 1998 compilation Crystal Ball as "Tell Me How U Wanna B Done".

The track also features Prince's last use of his Yamaha DX7 synthesizer. When the DX7 was up for sale in 2020 by Shane T. Keller, Prince's main engineer during the recording, he remarked how Prince had used the DX7 before he sold it in 1995 to him:

When we were working on the Purple Medley, Prince asked me, "Can you get my DX7?". I had to look for it, so that is how I knew where it was later in the year during the fire sale. His handwriting is all over it, and he assumed ownership of it when I brought it into Studio A. Indeed, it was his, and I saw him play it.

== Chart performance ==
The song performed rather poorly in the charts worldwide and received very little night airplay in the US on radio station mixshows. It peaked at number 84 on the Billboard Hot 100 and number 74 on the R&B chart. In the UK, the medley reached number 33.

== Music video ==
On January 26, 1996, VH1 aired Love 4 One Another, a one-hour Artist special. The "Purple Medley" video takes place as one of Prince's biggest fans sneaks backstage and watches the video on a floppy disk. The video uses old Prince footage, with new footage of the NPG and Prince's first wife Mayte Garcia during songs which don't have clips, such as "Sexy Dancer", "Let's Work", "Irresistible Bitch" and "If I Was Your Girlfriend". It also features live footage from the Tokyo Dome. It cuts short during "If I Was Your Girlfriend", then repeats the spoken introduction from "Let's Go Crazy" and displays the burial of Prince's chain cap that he wears in the "My Name Is Prince" clip, which consisted of footage from 3 Chains o' Gold. A screen then displays "Prince: 1958–1993. May He Rest In Peace." A full version was done, however, and circulates on bootlegs.

== Charts ==
Chart performance for "Purple Medley"
Chart (1995)	Peak position
Australia (ARIA)	40
Netherlands (Dutch Top 40)	26
Netherlands (Single Top 100)	30
Norway (VG-lista)	19
Scotland (OCC)	35
UK Singles (Official Charts)	33
US Billboard Hot 100	84
US Hot R&B Singles (Billboard)	74
US Maxi-Singles Sales (Billboard)	15
