= Glam Slam Ulysses =

- Poster for Glam Slam Ulysses
- Music: Prince
- Lyrics: Prince
- Basis: Homer's Odyssey
- Productions: Glam Slam, Los Angeles, 1993

Glam Slam Ulysses was a 1993 musical production by Prince, loosely based on Homer's Odyssey, featuring a combination of live performances and video, with twelve previously unreleased songs.

Each song represented an element from Homer's Odyssey (Ulysses is the Latin name for the protagonist, Odysseus). The musical received a limited performance at Prince's Glam Slam nightclub, with a few shows being performed in late August to early September 1993. Carmen Electra, who was relatively unknown at the time, was a featured dancer in the performance, as was Frank Williams. Jamie King provided the choreography.

When Prince first announced to change his name to an unpronounceable symbol on June 7, 1993, he also stated that he would no longer be releasing new albums; instead he was to focus on alternative performances, films, etc., while his record company, Warner Bros. Records, would be able to release albums from Prince's vault of unreleased material to fulfill his contract. The first of these alternative performances would be Glam Slam Ulysses.

== Songs ==
As listed on a flier for the production, the story elements were represented by the following songs:

Story element	Song
The Ship	"Strays of the World"
Lotus Land	"Dolphin"
The Cyclops	"Interactive"
Circe	"Pheromone"
Penelope	"Dark"
Hades	"Loose"
The Sirens	"Space"
Scylla	"What's My Name"
Calypso	"Endorphinmachine"
The Suitors	"Race"
The Trojan Horse	"Come"
The Homecoming	"Strays of the World"
The Celebration	"Pope"

== See also ==
- Epic: The Musical, a 2020s musical based on the Odyssey
- The Golden Apple, a 1954 musical based on the Iliad and Odyssey
- Home Sweet Homer, a 1975 musical based on the Odyssey
