= Adore (Prince song) =

Song by Prince

from the album Sign o' the Times
- Released: March 31, 1987
- Recorded: November 19, 1986
- Studio: Sunset Sound, Hollywood, California
- Genre: R&B; soul
- Length: 6:29
- Label: Paisley Park; Warner Bros.
- Songwriter: Prince
- Producer: Prince

"Adore" is a song by Prince, and the last track on his 1987 double album Sign o' the Times. Adore is listed following the live track "It's Gonna Be a Beautiful Night", the crowd noise from which segues into Adore. A long, ornate slow jam featuring Atlanta Bliss and Eric Leeds on horns, it has been described by NME reviewer Paolo Hewitt as "a sugar ballad that harks back to the Stylistics but is indelibly Prince's, a lush yet remarkable piece of music, and a fitting climax". Despite never being released as a single, it received significant radio play, and became an occasional part of Prince's concert repertoire. A 4-minute-long edit of the song appears on the 1993 compilation album The Hits/The B-Sides, with the Girl 6 soundtrack album containing the full-length version. Prince's 2002 live album One Nite Alone... Live! includes a solo performance of "Adore" with piano accompaniment.

In 2009, Essence magazine included the song in their list of the "25 Best Slow Jams of All Time".

In 2010, users of AOL Radio voted "Adore" #2 on a ranked list of Prince's best songs.

It is ranked number 431 on Rolling Stone's list of The 500 Greatest Songs of All Time.

In 2026, Essence voted the song the fourth greatest R&B song of all time and the highest ranked 1980s song on the list.

== Personnel ==
Credits from Duane Tudahl, Benoît Clerc and Guitarcloud

- Prince – lead and backing vocals, Hammond organ, Ensoniq Mirage, Prophet VS, Fairlight CMI, bass guitar, Linn LM-1
- Eric Leeds – saxophone
- Atlanta Bliss – trumpet
- Novi Novog – violin

== Cover versions and samples ==
Other performers who have recorded "Adore" include Silk, TQ, Julius Papp, and Joe Roberts.

The song "All That" on Carmen Electra's Prince-produced debut album is based on a sample from Adore.
