= If I Love U 2 Nite =

1991 song by Mica Paris

Single by Mica Paris

from the album Contribution
- B-side: "I Wish I'd Never Met You" (with Bobby Womack) / "Stand Up"
- Released: 1991
- Genre: R&B
- Length: 5:38
- Label: 4th & B'way
- Songwriter: Prince
- Producers: Andres Levin; Camus Maré Celli

Mica Paris singles chronology
"South of the River" (1990)	"If I Love U 2 Nite" (1991)	"Young Soul Rebels" (1991)

Music video
- "If I Love U 2nite" on YouTube

"If I Love U 2nite" is a song by British singer and actress Mica Paris. It was released in 1991 by 4th & B'way Records as the third single from her second album, Contribution (1990) and peaked at No. 43 on the UK Singles Chart. It is written by Prince and produced by Andres Levin and Camus Maré Celli.

== Track listings ==
CD single

No.	Title	Lyrics	Producer	Length
1.	"If I Love U 2 Nite" (Nellee's Club U 2 Nite Mix)	Prince	Nellee Hooper	6:03
2.	"If I Love U 2 Nite" (Nellee's Club U 2 Nite Edit)	Prince	Nellee Hooper	4:08
3.	"I Wish I'd Never Met You" (with Bobby Womack)	Mica Paris, Patrick Moten	Joseph A. Greene, Patrick Moten	4:50
4.	"Stand Up" (Extended Mix)	Mica Paris, Nick Hallam, Rob Birch	Ultimatum	4:42

7" vinyl

Side one
No.	Title	Lyrics	Producer	Length
1.	"If I Love U 2 Nite" (Nellee's Club U 2 Nite Edit)	Prince	Nellee Hooper	4:08

Side two
No.	Title	Lyrics	Producer	Length
2.	"Stand Up"	Mica Paris, Nick Hallam, Rob Birch	Ultimatum	3:59

12" vinyl

Side one
No.	Title	Lyrics	Producer	Length
1.	"If I Love U 2 Nite" (Nellee's Club U 2 Nite Mix)	Prince	Nellee Hooper	6:03
2.	"If I Love U 2 Nite" (Nellee's Club U 2 Nite Edit)	Prince	Nellee Hooper	4:08

Side two
No.	Title	Lyrics	Producer	Length
3.	"I Wish I'd Never Met You" (with Bobby Womack)	Mica Paris, Patrick Moten	Joseph A. Greene, Patrick Moten	4:50
4.	"Stand Up" (Extended Mix)	Mica Paris, Nick Hallam, Rob Birch	Ultimatum	4:42

== Charts ==
Chart (1991)	Peak position
UK Singles (OCC)	43
UK Dance (Music Week)	8

== Mayte version ==
"If I Love U 2nite"

Single by Mayte

from the album Child of the Sun
- B-side: "The Rhythm of Your Heart"
- Released: 6 November 1995
- Recorded: Home studio, Minneapolis and Sunset Sound; 1994–1995
- Genre: Pop
- Length: 4:20
- Label: Paisley Park Records
- Songwriter: Prince
- Producer: Prince

Mayte singles chronology
"The Most Beautiful Boy in the World" (1994)	"If I Love U 2nite" (1995)	"The Rhythm of Your Heart" (1995)

"If I Love U 2nite" (also known as "If Eye Love U 2night") was recorded by Mayte and released as the second single from her sole album, Child of the Sun. In Mayte's narration of her love story, in which she and her lover's first date was "in bed", she asks him if he'll love her forever. The song was suggested to be about Prince, whom she was dating at the time. The two would later wed on Valentine's Day, 1996.

=== History ===
The song was originally written by Prince for his band member Gayle Chapman to sing. Chapman recorded two versions of this song. Later, Prince sang it as an outtake in 1987 from a man's point of view. It was also covered by Mica Paris in 1991. The original Prince guide vocal for "If I Love U 2 Nite" appeared by mistake on the rare Mica Paris Stand for Love EP, of which only a handful exist. It was Mayte's biggest hit and a fan favorite due to Mayte's shy, cute, pop sound, unlike the others' soul sound. Chapman and Prince both performed this as a ballad.

=== Track listings ===
CD #1
NPG Records / 0061635NPG (Europe)

1. "If Eye Love U 2night" (Radio Edit) (3:30)
2. "If Eye Love U 2night" (Album Version) (4:19)
3. "If Eye Love U 2night" (Spanish) (4:20)
4. "The Rhythm of Your Heart" (3:17)

CD No. 2 (The Remixes)
NPG Records / 0061925NPG (Europe)

1. "If Eye Love U 2night" (Album Version) (4:19)
2. "If Eye Love U 2night" (Lil' Cash Mix) (5:02)
3. "If Eye Love U 2night" (Displacement Mix) (6:05)
4. "If Eye Love U 2night" (Tweakin' Dub) (7:13)

Cassette
NPG Records / 0061639NPG (Europe)

1. "If Eye Love U 2night" (Radio Edit) (3:30)
2. "The Rhythm of Your Heart" (3:17)
