= I Hate U (Prince song) =

1995 song by Prince

" Hate U"
- UK 12" single

Single by Prince

from the album The Gold Experience
- B-side: " Hate U" (Quiet Night Mix by Eric Leeds) (7"); "Endorphinmachine" (Japan CD)
- Released: September 12, 1995
- Recorded: December 3, 1993
- Studio: Paisley Park, Chanhassen
- Genre: R&B; soul
- Length: 4:27 (7" edit); 5:58 (album version); 6:17 (extended remix)
- Label: NPG; Warner Bros.
- Songwriter: Prince
- Producers: Prince; Ricky Peterson

Prince singles chronology
"Purple Medley" (1995)	" Hate U" (1995)	"Gold" (1995)

Music video
- "👁 Hate U" on YouTube

" Hate U", commonly transliterated as "Eye Hate U", is a song by American musician Prince, released on September 12, 1995 by NPG and Warner Bros. Records, as the lead single from his seventeenth studio album, The Gold Experience (1995). It was also Prince's last original single to reach the US Top 40, peaking at number 12 on the Billboard Hot 100. In the UK, it peaked at number 20. A music video was produced to promote the single, but never officially released until it was made available after Prince's death, on the official Prince YouTube channel in 2018.

== Development and songwriting ==
" Hate U" was nearly a solo effort from Prince, although he credited Minneapolis musician Ricky Peterson with co-production and arranging, as well as providing additional keyboards. American actress, model and singer Carmen Electra says Prince told her it was about her:

I went out with a guy—I hadn't slept with this person—and Prince found out. He said, "I wrote this song about you," and then he played " Hate U."

— https://www.gq.com/story/prince-stories

=== Composition and lyrics ===
Beginning with crashing drums, the "NPG Operator" welcomes the listener to "The Hate Experience" (which Prince would later entitle the song's maxi-single), before leading into the first verse where Prince sings in delicate falsetto about a cheating woman, whom he hates "like a day without sunshine". A church-like organ moves the song along, while a musical segment borrowed from "Baby" (a track from his 1978 album For You) provides breaks throughout the track. After the second verse and chorus, the song enters a lengthy middle section which is sung/spoken in Prince's normal voice. This section is a "courtroom drama" where Prince submits his evidence of his cheating lover to a judge. When he asks the woman to state her name for the court, he interrupts her with a vocal reference from the album's previous track—"Billy Jack Bitch". Toward the end of the drama, he states that being without her is killing him emotionally and that he actually still loves her. After a final chorus, again using an impassioned falsetto, Prince launches into a brief but effective guitar solo which climaxes and ends the song.

== Chart performance ==
" Hate U" was Prince's last original single to reach the US Top 40. (His earlier hit "1999" did sneak back into the Top 40 in the song's namesake year, peaking at number 40, but this was a reissued single, not a new release and, in 1996, "Betcha by Golly Wow!" from Emancipation made the Top 40, but all of the singles from Emancipation were promotional in the US so they were not allowed to chart on the Hot 100—only on the Hot 100 Airplay. Several Prince songs also returned to the Top 40 in 2016, the year of his death, as re-entries; none were songs appearing in the top 40 for the first time).

" Hate U" was very successful on the charts. It peaked within the top 10 of the R&B/Hip-Hop and Rhythmic charts and it reached number 12 on the Billboard Hot 100. Unlike the last two Prince singles, " Hate U" was less s, however, receive minor Mainstream/Top 40 airplay as it charted inllboard Top 40 Mainstream chart. It did however receive minor Mainstream/Top 40 airplay as it did chart it the lower regions of the top 40 of the Mediabase / Radio+Records CHR/Pop Airplay chart. In the UK, the song peaked at number 20.

== Critical reception ==
In a retrospective review, Andy Healy from Albumism stated that the "heartbreak" in the song is "palpable as a bittersweet love song in the grandest tradition of "done me wrong" songs." In his weekly UK chart commentary in Dotmusic, James Masterton wrote, "Only the Artist Formerly Known As Prince could write a love song called 'I Hate You'", adding that "this one is unlikely to progress too much further even if it is one of his more laidback soulful efforts." Alexis Petridis from The Guardian said "I Hate You" is "The Most Beautiful Girl in the World"'s "evil twin", noting it as "more pillow-soft soul, this time attacking rather than hymning a woman, complete with a faintly problematic faux-courtroom scene." Chuck Campbell from Knoxville News Sentinel declared it as "a bitter-on-sex song on which the singer battles his contradictory feelings for an infidel as only he can." Cheo H. Coker from Los Angeles Times described it as a "ballad reminiscent of "International Lover", [that] finds Prince pulling out his famous falsetto to castigate a lover foolish enough to leave him for another man." Simon Price from Melody Maker named it Single of the Week. Pan-European magazine Music & Media also named it Single of the Week, commenting, "Hatred is a subject you either treat with fury or with restrained anger. But Prince simply fits in both methods in a ballad with the perfect build-up from low-key to intensity." Carol Cooper from Rolling Stone viewed it as "soulful", adding that it "sums up the Princely persona in a nutshell. He loves his women and his colleagues, but he can't allow them a dominant role in his life or his work."

== Music video ==
There was an unreleased music video circulating among Prince collectors of this single. The music video, which was filmed at Paisley Park Studios on October 22, 1995 and directed by Prince himself, featured Prince's then-fiancée Mayte Garcia, dancing in some shots and Prince telling Mayte off in the courtroom, and Michael Bland (part of The New Power Generation) as the judge. On January 26, 2018, the video was finally revealed to the public on the official Prince YouTube channel. It has amassed more than 1.8 million views as of December 2025.

== B-sides/remixes ==
The single's B-side was an instrumental "Quiet Night Mix" of " Hate U" featuring long-time collaborator Eric Leeds on saxophone. A maxi single on CD and vinyl included several remixes of the track. The most notable was an extended remix which omitted the "courtroom drama" and featured Prince delivering much more personal lyrics. A rumor at the time was that the lyrics of this version referred to Carmen Electra (whom Prince had worked with and dated for a time) after it was discovered that she "gave her body to" N.P.G. member Tony M. "in the name of fun". Electra has confirmed that the song was written about her. Other versions of the song were various edits. The Japanese CD single was unique in that it included the album version of "Endorphinmachine" as an extra track.

== Charts ==
=== Weekly charts ===
Weekly chart performance for " Hate U"
Chart (1995)	Peak position
Australia (ARIA)	33
Belgium (Ultratop 50 Flanders)	43
Europe (European Dance Radio)	5
Europe (European Hit Radio)	5
Germany (GfK)	62
Italy Airplay (Music & Media)	2
Netherlands (Dutch Top 40)	20
Netherlands (Single Top 100)	18
New Zealand (Recorded Music NZ)	22
Scotland (OCC)	24
Switzerland (Schweizer Hitparade)	31
UK Singles (OCC)	20
UK Airplay (Music Week)	9
US Billboard Hot 100	12
US Hot R&B/Hip-Hop Songs (Billboard)	3
US Maxi-Singles Sales (Billboard)	3
US Rhythmic Airplay (Billboard)	9

=== Year-end charts ===
Year-end chart performance for " Hate U"
Chart (1995)	Position
Europe (European Dance Radio)	6
US Hot R&B/Hip-Hop Songs (Billboard)	66
