= Dinner with Delores =

- UK CD single

Single by Prince

from the album Chaos and Disorder
- B-side: "Had U"; "Right the Wrong"
- Released: July 8, 1996
- Recorded: April 1996
- Studio: South Beach
- Genre: Pop rock; psychedelic soul; blues rock
- Length: 2:46
- Label: Warner Bros.
- Songwriter: Prince
- Producer: Prince

Prince singles chronology
"Gold" (1995)	"Dinner with Delores" (1996)	"Betcha by Golly Wow!" (1996)

Music video
- "Dinner with Delores" on YouTube

"Dinner with Delores" is a song by American musician Prince (his stage name at that time being an unpronounceable symbol, see cover art), released in July 1996 by Warner Bros. as the only single from his 19th studio album, Chaos and Disorder (1996). Although the single was not released in the United States, the promotional video was shown on music video channels there. The CD single was backed with the short "Had U" and "Right the Wrong". The cassette single omitted "Right the Wrong". Both tracks were also from Chaos and Disorder.

== Critical reception ==
Larry Flick from Billboard magazine wrote, "At first listen, he mystifies with electric guitars that appear to be more country than funky and more AC than R&B. Upon closer examination, however, listeners will be impressed with the song's mellow, sobbing grooves and captivating lyrics." He added, "This may not stick like glue with fickle listeners, but there are several lush elements here that simply add another dimension to the already amazing body of work by the Purple One. Gorgeous production."

Daina Darzin from Cash Box noted that the song "takes a different tack than the rest of the disc's guitar-happy, funky vibe. A languid, undulating guitar line mixes it up with playful, syncopated rhythms and sweet, offbeat lyrics. A pretty, inventive guitar break proves (we hear he's going back to being called "Prince", thank God) remains an effortlessly brilliant musician. An automatic add at rock stations, 'Dinner with Delores' is mellow enough to get over on Adult Contemporary stations. This record got a big debut on NBC-TV's Today last week." Alexis Petridis from The Guardian described it as "a sweet, if slight, song cut from the same pop-rock cloth as 'Manic Monday'." Taylor Parkes from Melody Maker viewed it as "sweet Psychedelic soft-soul". Alan Jones from Music Week named it "a pleasant, accessible and straightforward pop track". Brad Shoup form Stereogum described the song as blues rock.

== Charts ==
Chart performance for "Dinner with Delores"
Chart (1996–97)	Peak position
Estonia (Eesti Top 20)	8
Europe (European Dance Radio)	3
Italy Airplay (Music & Media)	10
Netherlands (Dutch Top 40 Tipparade)	19
Netherlands (Dutch Single Tip)	12
Scotland Singles (OCC)	33
UK Singles (OCC)	36
UK Hip Hop/R&B (OCC)	5
