= Love Sign =

1994 song by Prince

Promotional single by Nona Gaye and Prince

from the album 1-800-NEW-FUNK
- B-side: "2gether"
- Released: June 1994 (radio only)
- Recorded: 1994
- Genre: Soul; disco; funk; hip hop; new jack swing
- Length: 4:34
- Label: NPG
- Songwriter: Prince
- Producer: Prince

"Love Sign" is a song by American musician Prince, from the 1-800-NEW-FUNK compilation album released by his independent record label NPG Records in 1994.

"Love Sign" was the most successful song released from the album, and it is a duet with Nona Gaye, although Prince (known as "The Artist Formerly Known as Prince" at the time because of his name change to an unpronounceable symbol) is uncredited as a singer due to his contractual dispute with Warner Bros. Records. A promotional single was sent out to radio stations independently through Prince's record label NPG Records, and was not commercially released. The song has an anti-violence message and was most successful on the R&B charts (becoming a top 40 hit). The song also received a remix by Shock G on Prince's album Crystal Ball.

== Music video ==
The music video was directed by rapper Ice Cube in 1994 on a Monday. Gaye and Prince are both featured prominently in the video. It received major airplay on BET and was very successful on its Top 20 countdown. The video shows Gaye at an anti-violence convention and Prince as a secret love tryst. At the end of the video Gaye is lying in Prince's bed and Prince walks away shaking his head jokingly. Most of the video was shot at Paisley Park.

== Promotion ==
The song was performed live on Soul Train in 1994.

== Chart performance ==
The song was released as a promotional single and therefore was not allowed to chart on the US Billboard Hot 100 or any other main US charts (promotional singles were not allowed to chart until late 1998, when Billboard changed its chart rules to include promotional/radio-only singles). It was a moderate success in the Urban/Rhythmic market, making the top 40 of the R&B Airplay and Rhythmic Top 40 charts. It was a minor success on the main US airplay chart, debuting and peaking at number 72 on the Hot 100 Airplay chart for one week.

== Track listing ==
- US promo CD single
1. "Lovesign" by Nona Gaye and Prince – 4:34
2. "2gether" by the New Power Generation – 5:06
- German promo CD single and UK 12" promo single
1. "Lovesign" (radio edit) – 3:24
2. "Lovesign" (1-800-NEW-FUNK version) – 4:33
3. "Lovesign" (Storyboard Video Mix) – 5:36

== Charts ==
=== Weekly charts ===
Chart performance for "Love Sign"
| Chart (1994) | Peak position |
|---|---|
| Europe (European Hit Radio) | 21 |
| US Radio Songs (Billboard) | 72 |
| US R&B/Hip-Hop Airplay (Billboard) | 32 |
| US Rhythmic Airplay (Billboard) | 30 |
