= Come On (The New Power Generation song) =

- NPG CD single

Single by the New Power Generation

from the album Newpower Soul
- B-side: "The One"
- Released: October 16, 1998
- Recorded: May–December 1997
- Studio: Paisley Park, Chanhassen, Minnesota, US
- Genre: Pop, funk
- Length: 6:00
- Label: NPG Records
- Songwriter(s): Prince
- Producer(s): Prince

The New Power Generation singles chronology
"The War" (1998)	"Come On" (1998)	"Peace" / "2045: Radical Man" (2001)

"Come On" is a song and the only single released from The New Power Generation's 1998 album Newpower Soul. Although attributed to the New Power Generation, the song prominently features Prince, as do all songs from the album. The song features Chaka Khan on background vocals. An official video was made, in which Prince humorously disguises himself as an older man, playing jokes with his band members at a park in London, intercut with footage from his Beautiful Strange concert video, filmed at Café de Paris (London).

The maxi single included several remixes of the song and an exclusive disc sold only through Prince's 1-800-NEW-FUNK store also included a remix of Newpower Soul's "The One".

== Track listing ==
Maxi single

- "Come On" (Doug E. Fresh Mix)
- "Come On" (Remix)
- "Come On" (Album Edit)
- "Come On" (Hypermix)
- "Come On" (Latenitemix)
- "Come On" (Acapella)
- "The One" (Remix) only available on 1-800-NEW-FUNK maxi-single

== Charts ==
Chart performance for "Come On"
Chart (1998)	Peak position
UK Singles (OCC)	65
