= Space (Prince song) =

- US 12" single

Single by Prince

from the album Come
- A-side: "Space" (Universal Love Radio Remix) (7")
- B-side: "Space" (album version) (7"); Various remixes of "Space" (12" and maxi-single)
- Released: November 1, 1994
- Recorded: May 3, 1993
- Studio: Paisley Park, Chanhassen
- Genre: Funk; pop; trip hop; downtempo
- Length: 4:28
- Label: Warner Bros.
- Songwriter: Prince
- Producer: Prince

Prince singles chronology
"Letitgo" (1994)	"Space" (1994)	"Purple Medley" (1995)

"Space" is a song by American musician Prince from his fifteenth album, Come (1994). The B-side of the single is actually the album track. The A-side is the Universal Love Radio Remix of "Space", with completely new lyrics.

In the album version of "Space" Prince sings about being obsessed with a lover and wanting to take their love higher comparing to the likes of space whereas the Universal Love Remix features a rap from Prince at the end which is lyrically similar to his smash hit "When Doves Cry" with a new bridge saying "All the pain that a human has to go through, in a planet that's so bitter and cold / Universal love awaits you, baby all you got to say is that you really, really, really wanna go / And we're outta here".

== Critical reception ==
Larry Flick from Billboard magazine wrote that the song follows the "cozy funk/pop" of the previous "Letitgo". He added, "Unlike his past releases, this track reflects current trends rather than dictating them. Of the five mixes included on the CD pressing, the strumming "Acoustic" remix works the best, giving the salacious, sex-happy lyrics some much-needed warmth." Chuck Campbell from Knoxville News Sentinel felt the "ensuing smooth cadence of 'Space' elevates the album a bit (though there's not much going on here, either)."

== Chart performance ==
While "Space" did not chart on any airplay charts, it did reach #71 on the US Billboard Hot R&B/Hip-Hop Songs chart due to single sales. In Australia, "Space" peaked at #91 on the ARIA singles chart.

== Track listing ==
- 7" single
1. "Space" (Universal Love Remix) – 6:10
2. "Space" (album version) – 4:30
- 12" / maxi single
1. "Space" (Universal Love Remix) – 6:10
2. "Space" (Funky Stuff Remix) – 5:42
3. "Space" (Funky Stuff Dub) – 4:47
4. "Space" (Acoustic Remix) – 4:40
5. "Space" (album version) – 4:30
6. "Space" (Universal Love Radio Remix) [Japan bonus track]

== Charts ==
Chart performance for "Space"
Chart (1994)	Peak position
Australia (ARIA)	91
US Hot R&B/Hip-Hop Songs (Billboard)	71
US Maxi-Singles Sales (Billboard)	45
