= Child of the Sun (album) =

Studio album by Mayte
- Released: November 27, 1995
- Recorded: Paisley Park, Chanhassen, Minnesota, US
- Genres: Pop; rock
- Languages: English; Spanish
- Labels: NPG, Edel
- Producers: Prince, Kirk Johnson

Professional ratings
Review scores
Source	Rating
AllMusic	2.5/5 stars

Child of the Sun is the only album by Mayte. It was released in 1995 in Europe, including the United Kingdom, but not formally released in the United States. The album was produced by Prince, and released by NPG Records. The album was not critically nor commercially successful. Songs on the album include "The Most Beautiful Boy in the World", a female version of Prince's song "The Most Beautiful Girl in the World", and "If Eye Love U 2night", a cover of the Mica Paris song. Those were the only two singles from the album. Also included on the album are a Spanish version of "If Eye Love U 2night"; "Love's No Fun", a cover of Elisa Fiorillo's song from her second album I Am; "House of Brick", a version of "Brick House" by the Commodores with Prince singing the chorus and a rap by Mayte; and "However Much U Want", a duet with Prince.

== Track listing ==
All songs written by Prince, except where noted

1. "Children of the Sun"
2. "In Your Gracious Name"
3. "If Love U 2night"
4. "The Rhythm of Your Heart"
5. "Ain't No Place Like U"
6. "House of Brick (Brick House)" (featuring Prince) (Nelson, William King, Thomas McClary, Walter Orange, Lionel Richie, Milan Williams, Ronald LaPread)
7. "Love's No Fun"
8. "Baby Don't Care"
9. "However Much U Want" (duet with Prince)
10. "Mo' Better"
11. "If Eye Love U 2night" (Spanish version)
12. "The Most Beautiful Boy in the World"
