= Letitgo =

1994 single by Prince

Single by Prince

from the album Come
- B-side: "Solo"; "Alexa De Paris"; "Pope"
- Released: August 9, 1994
- Recorded: March 16, 1994
- Studio: Paisley Park, Chanhassen
- Genre: R&B; funk; swingbeat
- Length: 5:33 (album version); 4:15 (7-inch edit)
- Label: Warner Bros.
- Songwriter: Prince
- Producers: Prince (original versions); Quincy "QD3" Jones III, Gerald "G Bomb" Baillergeau, J. Swift (remixes)

Prince singles chronology
"The Most Beautiful Girl in the World" (1994)	"Letitgo" (1994)	"Space" (1994)

"Letitgo" is a song by American musician Prince, released in August 1994, by Warner Bros. Records, as the first single from his fifteenth studio album, Come (1994). Despite statements that the album consisted entirely of "old" material, "Letitgo" was actually newly composed for the album. The mid-tempo song relies heavily on a drum machine pattern and bass guitar with synthesizers in the refrain. A keyboard and percussion solo appear toward the end. The song is sung in falsetto in unison with another track layered in his regular, lower register. Kathleen Bradford provides backing vocals, while Eric Leeds provides flute accompaniment.

The track was produced, arranged, composed and performed by Prince, with the additions of Kathleen Bradford on background vocals, Eric Leeds on flute and additional keyboards by Ricky Peterson. The lyrics speak of Prince's disappointment with Warner Bros. Records' decision not to release music as quickly as Prince created it. He chides them that they will be sorry when he leaves the company.

The B-side was the album track "Solo", a downbeat number with Prince's voice only accompanied by harp, which was composed by David Henry Hwang. The title refers not to a musical solo, but actually that Prince's mood is "so low". It ties in with the slightly more upbeat "Letitgo". In addition, a CD single was released in the UK containing an edit of "Letitgo", "Solo", the extended version of "Alexa de Paris" (originally the B-side to "Mountains" in 1986) and "Pope", which was originally on The Hits 2 from 1993. A maxi single on CD and vinyl included several remixes of the track provided by Quincy "QD3" Jones III, Chronic Freeze., J-Sw!ft and Gerald "G Bomb" Baillergeau.

== Critical reception ==
Larry Flick from Billboard magazine wrote, "On what could be one of the final projects issued under the name Prince, punters are given a dark jack/funk ditty, pumped with a thick bassline and a wicked hook that is truly irresistible. Given the heat he is enjoying at radio under his alter-ego, the future of this superior effort looks mighty bright. One of many reasons to dive into the new Come collection." In 2019, Alexis Petridis from The Guardian commented, "By 1994, Prince was more interested in fighting with his record company than the quality of his releases. Come was evidently thrown together to fulfill his contract. But even when he didn't really care, he couldn't turn his talent off completely. "Letitgo" isn't a classic, but nor is it a disaster. Perhaps he made more of an effort because its about his desire to leave the Warners label."

Chuck Campbell from Knoxville News Sentinel called it a "snoozer single". In his weekly UK chart commentary, James Masterton described it as "a fairly nondescript piece of Prince funk", while Dave Jennings from Melody Maker viewed it as "a monstrously tedious, tired piece of wine-bar funk". Pan-European magazine Music & Media wrote, "After the royalty in exile as Symbol, he now returns in his original identity with a mean swingbeat track of early Janet Jackson proportions. Will he keep the ballet army under control?" Alan Jones from Music Week gave "Letitgo" a score of four out of five, calling it "one of his seductive rolling funk numbers". In his review of Come, Tim Marsh from Select said, "The only signs of life appear on 'Let It Go', which marries swingbeats to a Clinton-esque melody". Sylvia Patterson from Smash Hits gave it two out of five, writing, "This is what you'd call one of his "mid-pace" sojourns, trunding along with it's [sic] interesting thumb-flappin' bass and, he's like, just "sitting back and lettin' the vibe flow", man and that's about that, really."

== Chart performance ==
"Letitgo" was moderately successful on the charts, peaking at number 31 on the US Billboard Hot 100, number 10 on the R&B/Hip-Hop chart, number 13 on the Rhythmic chart, number 17 on the Mainstream/Pop chart and number 30 on the UK Singles Chart.

== Music video ==
The accompanying music video for "Letitgo" contains clips from the 3 Chains o Gold motion picture. It contains Prince signing a contract with an early version of his love symbol signature.

== Track listings ==
- US 12-inch and CD
1. "Letitgo" (Caviar radio edit) – 4:59
2. "Letitgo" (Cavi' street edit) – 5:02
3. "Letitgo" (Instrumental) – 5:02
4. "Letitgo" (On the Cool-Out Tip radio edit) – 4:34
5. "Letitgo" (Sherm Stick edit) – 5:42
6. "Letitgo" ((-) Sherm Stick edit) – 5:42
7. "Letitgo" (original radio edit) – 4:15
8. "Letitgo" (original album version) – 5:33
- 7-inch single
1. "Letitgo" (edit) – 4:15
2. "Solo" – 3:48
- UK 12-inch single and CD
1. "Letitgo" (edit) – 4:15
2. "Solo" – 3:48
3. "Alexa de Paris" (extended version) – 4:54
4. "Pope" – 3:28

== Charts ==
=== Weekly charts ===
Weekly chart performance for "Letitgo"
Chart (1994)	Peak position
Australia (ARIA)	22
Austria (Ö3 Austria Top 40)	29
Belgium (Ultratop 50 Flanders)	28
Canada Retail Singles (The Record)	20
Europe (European AC Radio)	16
Europe (European Dance Radio)	6
Europe (European Hit Radio)	6
Finland (IFPI)	11
France (SNEP)	46
Germany (GfK)	45
Netherlands (Dutch Top 40)	18
Netherlands (Single Top 100)	14
New Zealand (Recorded Music NZ)	24
Norway (VG-lista)	7
Scotland (OCC)	34
Switzerland (Schweizer Hitparade)	21
UK Singles (Official Charts)	30
UK Airplay (Music Week)	18
US Billboard Hot 100	31
US Hot R&B/Hip-Hop Songs (Billboard)	10
US Maxi-Singles Sales (Billboard)	22
US Pop Airplay (Billboard)	17
US Rhythmic Airplay (Billboard)	13

=== Year-end charts ===
Year-end chart performance for "Letitgo"
Chart (1994)	Position
US Hot R&B/Hip-Hop Songs (Billboard)	94

== Release history ==
Release history and formats for "Letitgo"
Region	Date	Format(s)	Label(s)	Ref.
United States	August 9, 1994	7-inch vinyl; 12inch vinyl; CD; cassette	Warner Bros.	
United Kingdom	August 30, 1994	7-inch vinyl; 12inch vinyl; CD; cassette	Warner Bros.	
