= Gold (Prince song) =

Single by Prince

from the album The Gold Experience
- B-side: "Rock 'N' Roll Is Alive! (And It Lives in Minneapolis)"; "I Hate U" (Extended Remix) (CD)
- Released: November 27, 1995
- Recorded: October 1993
- Studio: Paisley Park, Chanhassen
- Genre: Arena rock; soft rock
- Length: 4:43 (7" edit); 7:23 (album version)
- Label: NPG; Warner Bros.
- Songwriter: Prince
- Producer: Prince

Prince singles chronology
" Hate U" (1995)	"Gold" (1995)	"Dinner with Delores" (1996)

Music video
- "Gold" on YouTube

"Gold" is a song by American musician Prince, his stage name at that time being an unpronounceable symbol, and was released in November 1995 by NPG and Warner Bros. Records as the third single from his seventeenth studio album, The Gold Experience (1995). It peaked at number ten on the UK Singles Chart and number 88 on the US Billboard Hot 100. A limited edition gold CD single was released in the UK, housed in a gold jewel case. The track listing was the same as the standard CD single. The accompanying music video for "Gold" was directed by Prince himself.

The B-side was "Rock 'n' Roll Is Alive (And It Lives in Minneapolis)", a response to the song "Rock and Roll Is Dead" by Lenny Kravitz. The song complements the rock-based "Gold" and features rousing guitar solos and live drumming as well as various studio tricks throughout the track. The chorus is a sample recorded from a live audience. Prince would later use the technique on several songs for The New Power Generation release Newpower Soul. Prince also made a special remix of the song called the "Tony Fly Mix" to be played on the local Minneapolis DJ's radio program. The remix remains unreleased. A maxi single on CD and vinyl also included the extended remix of "I Hate U".

== Chart performance ==
The song achieved little initial success in the US, with minor Mainstream radio play and no R&B/Hip-Hop or Rhythmic radio play, and weak sales. It peaked at number 88 and stayed on the Billboard Hot 100 for two weeks. The single was far more successful in the United Kingdom, where it reached number ten on the UK Singles Chart and became Prince's last original top-ten hit there. "Gold" also peaked at number one on the European Dance Radio Chart in January 1996.

== Critical reception ==
In a retrospective review, Andy Healy from Albumism stated that the song "is filled with uplift and hope despite the trials and tribulations it documents." He added, "It's The Artist's very own 'Purple Rain' moment, if you will, with rousing chorus, powerful arrangement, soaring guitar solo and epic seven-plus-minute run time. It's also the track that fulfills a promise as it welcomes us to The Dawn." Upon the release, Gil L. Robertson IV from Cash Box named 'Gold' a standout track of the Gold Experience album. Greg Kot from Chicago Tribune noted its "arena rock".

James Masterton for Dotmusic complimented it as "a classic single", saying, "For all his self-indulgence on records, when he wants to pull the ace from up his sleeve he does so in style and 'Gold' is almost certainly destined to go down as a classic Prince record." Alexis Petridis from The Guardian found that it "reiterates the anti-materialistic message of 1992's 'Money Don't Matter 2 Night'. It's not groundbreaking in the way Prince's singles once were, but it's exquisitely written." Chuck Campbell from Knoxville News Sentinel described it as "familiar-sounding" and "religiously overtoned".

== Music video ==
A music video was produced to promote the single, filmed at Paisley Park Studios on October 10, 1995 and directed by Prince himself. It was later published on Prince's official YouTube channel in 2017, and had generated more than 7.4 million views as of early 2025.

== Charts ==
=== Weekly charts ===
Weekly chart performance for "Gold"
Chart (1995–1996)	Peak position
Australia (ARIA)	94
Belgium (Ultratop 50 Flanders)	42
Europe (European Dance Radio)	1
Europe (European Hit Radio)	5
Germany (GfK)	58
Ireland (IRMA)	23
Israel (Israeli Singles Chart)	29
Italy Airplay (Music & Media)	3
Netherlands (Dutch Top 40)	24
Netherlands (Single Top 100)	25
Scottish Singles Sales (Official Charts)	9
Sweden (Sverigetopplistan)	19
UK Singles (Official Charts)	10
US Billboard Hot 100	88
US Hot R&B Singles (Billboard)	92
US Mainstream Top 40 (Billboard)	39

=== Year-end charts ===
Year-end chart performance for "Gold"
Chart (1995)	Position
UK Singles (OCC)	99

Chart (1996)	Position
UK Airplay (Music Week)	46
