= Girl 6 (album) =

Soundtrack album by Prince
- Released: March 19, 1996
- Recorded: 1982–1996
- Genre: R&B; funk; smooth soul
- Length: 61:13
- Label: Warner Bros.
- Producer: Prince

Prince chronology
| The Gold Experience (1995) | Girl 6 (1996) | Chaos and Disorder (1996) |

Singles from Girl 6
- 1. "Girl 6" Released: March 26, 1996

Professional ratings
Review scores
| Source | Rating |
|---|---|
| AllMusic | 4.5/5 stars |
| MusicHound Rock: The Essential Album Guide | 3.5/5 stars |

Girl 6 is the soundtrack album to the Spike Lee film of the same name. All songs were written by Prince. It was released on March 19, 1996, by Warner Bros. Records. The album consists of mostly previously released songs from Prince and related artists such as the Family, Vanity 6, and the New Power Generation. The three previously unreleased tracks are "She Spoke 2 Me" (recorded in 1991–1992), "Don't Talk 2 Strangers" (recorded in 1992, during sessions for the proposed I'll Do Anything soundtrack) and "Girl 6", which was newly recorded for the soundtrack.

The title track was released as a single, backed with "Nasty Girl" by Vanity 6.

== Song descriptions ==
=== Previously unreleased tracks ===
"She Spoke 2 Me" is a jazzy song, recorded with the NPG in 1991–1992, possibly for the Love Symbol album. The song is delivered in falsetto vocals and features The NPG horn section. An extended version of the song was later released on 1999's The Vault: Old Friends 4 Sale that extends the song with several minutes of jazzy instrumentation. "Don't Talk 2 Strangers" was recorded in 1992 for the proposed I'll Do Anything soundtrack. Prince was commissioned to write the soundtrack for the film (a musical comedy at that time) and the film's actors were to sing his songs. In an early screening, the film was heavily panned. As a result, the film was re-done as a non-musical and Prince's music was pulled. The track is a gentle song, originally set for a mother to be sung to her daughter. The ballad features little more than piano, and was delivered in falsetto. "Don't Talk 2 Strangers" was later covered by Chaka Khan on her 1998 Prince collaboration Come 2 My House. The newly written "Girl 6" is a poppy song with elements of hip-hop such as scratching and sampling (bits from the film, as well as Prince hits). The lyrics describe the film's lead character and were delivered by Prince with Nona Gaye. The song was credited to The New Power Generation, with music by Tommy Barbarella and lyrics by Prince.

=== Other tracks ===
"Pink Cashmere" was a single from The Hits/The B-Sides in 1993. "Erotic City" was a Purple Rain-era B-side from 1984, also released on The Hits/The B-Sides. "Hot Thing", "Adore", and "The Cross" were all lifted from 1987's Sign o' the Times. "How Come U Don't Call Me Anymore?" was a B-side from 1982 and was also collected on The Hits/The B-Sides. "Girls & Boys" came from Parade, the soundtrack album for the film Under the Cherry Moon.

== Track listing ==
All songs written and performed by Prince, except where noted.

| No. | Title | Writer(s) | Original Release | Length |
|---|---|---|---|---|
| 1. | "She Spoke 2 Me" | | Original Release (Note: Later released on The Vault: Old Friends 4 Sale.) | 4:19 |
| 2. | "Pink Cashmere" | | The Hits/The B-Sides | 6:15 |
| 3. | "Count the Days" (The New Power Generation) | | Exodus | 3:26 |
| 4. | "Girls & Boys" | | Parade | 5:31 |
| 5. | "The Screams of Passion" (The Family) | | The Family | 5:27 |
| 6. | "Nasty Girl" (Vanity 6) | | Vanity 6 | 5:14 |
| 7. | "Erotic City" | | Let's Go Crazy B-side | 3:55 |
| 8. | "Hot Thing" | | Sign o' the Times | 5:41 |
| 9. | "Adore" | | Sign o' the Times | 6:31 |
| 10. | "The Cross" | | Sign o' the Times | 4:46 |
| 11. | "How Come U Don't Call Me Anymore?" | | 1999 B-side | 3:55 |
| 12. | "Don't Talk 2 Strangers" | | Original Release | 3:11 |
| 13. | "Girl 6" (The New Power Generation) | Tommy Barbarella | Original Release | 4:04 |
| Total length: | | | | 59:58 |

== Charts ==
Chart performance for Girl 6
| Chart (1996) | Peak position |
|---|---|
| Dutch Albums (Album Top 100) | 83 |
| US Billboard 200 | 75 |
| US Top R&B/Hip-Hop Albums (Billboard) | 15 |
