= Gold Nigga =

Studio album by The New Power Generation
- Released: August 31, 1993
- Recorded: April 1992; August–December 1992; May–June 1993 (except for "Call the Law" which was recorded in December 1990)
- Genres: Funk, hip hop
- Length: 47:03
- Label: NPG
- Producer: The New Power Generation (de facto Prince)

The New Power Generation chronology
Love Symbol (1992)	Gold Nigga (1993)	Exodus (1995)

Singles from Gold Nigga
- 1. "2gether" Released: August 31, 1993

Gold Nigga is the first studio album by the New Power Generation. It was only made available for sale at some concert venue merchandise stalls on tour in 1993, through Prince's 1-800-NEW-FUNK telephone retail outlet, and at Paisley Park during the 2001 Celebration. It was also sold in Prince's own, now defunct, retail outlets. It has long been out of print, thus copies are very scarce and can fetch high prices second-hand.

== Background ==
The album presents hip hop in the setting of a live band. Vocalist Tony M. raps on most of the songs and a variety of segues throughout the album provide a humorous storyline about the recording of the album, as well as Tony M.'s sexual exploits. Many of the themes are about racism and other ills in the Black community. Prince plays a background role in the album, though he sings in character on the songs "Black M.F. In the House" and "Johnny". Both songs were played live in concert by Prince several times during this time period. The track "Call the Law" is older than most of the songs, being considered for release on an early version of 1991's Diamonds and Pearls and later being released as a B-side for a track from that album, "Money Don't Matter 2 Night". Rosie Gaines provides backing vocals for "Call the Law", although she left the NPG long before Gold Nigga was compiled. The album was the first release after Warner Bros. Records shut down Paisley Park Records.

The track "Guess Who's Knockin'" referenced Paul McCartney's "Let 'Em In" without credit. Probably to avoid any legal difficulties, the track was removed from second and subsequent pressings, making initial copies of the album even more highly sought after.

== Track listing ==
1. "Goldnigga pt. 1" – 3:11
2. "Guess Who's Knockin'?" – 3:25 (Note: Only appeared in first pressings of the album; it was later removed due to concerns of legal issues with Paul McCartney over the song referencing Let 'Em In.)
3. "Oilcan" – 0:42
4. "Segue" – 0:16
5. "Deuce & a Quarter" – 3:19
6. "Segue" – 0:21
7. "Black M.F. in the House" – 5:09
8. "Goldnigga pt. 2" – 2:52
9. "Goldie's Parade" – 2:22
10. "Segue" – 0:36
11. "2gether" – 5:32
12. "Segue" – 0:45
13. "Call the Law" – 4:16
14. "Johnny" – 10:20
15. "Segue" – 1:13
16. "Goldnigga pt. 3" – 2:38

== Singles ==
- "2gether"
1. "12-inch Mix"
2. "Interview"
3. "Enlightenment"
4. "Jeep Mix"
5. "Instrumental"
