= Newpower Soul =

Studio album by New Power Generation
- Released: June 30, 1998
- Recorded: May 1997 – February 1998
- Studios: Paisley Park, Chanhassen, Minnesota
- Genres: Pop; funk
- Length: 60:03
- Label: NPG
- Producer: New Power Generation (de facto Prince)

New Power Generation chronology
| Exodus (1995) | Newpower Soul (1998) |

Singles from Newpower Soul
- 1. "The One" Released: April 13, 1998 (promotional single); 2. "Come On" Released: October 16, 1998

Newpower Soul is the third and final studio album by the New Power Generation, released in 1998. Although credited to the New Power Generation, it is considered a de facto Prince album (his stage name at that time being an unpronounceable symbol).

== Reception ==
Professional ratings
Review scores
| Source | Rating |
|---|---|
| AllMusic | 2/5 stars |

Stephen Thomas Erlewine of AllMusic wrote that after the four-disc Crystal Ball, "it was time to release a concise, focused pop-funk record that proved he could still deliver. And it does, to a certain extent." He called it "a tight, focused record, filled with energetic funk workouts and classy, seductive ballads" that is "paced to entertain" with "no shortage of well-crafted songs. The problem is, nothing stands out and makes itself known. Certainly, the album sounds great as it's playing, but it cements Prince's evolution from groundbreaker to craftsman."

== Track listing ==
All lyrics are written by Prince, except where noted.

| No. | Title | Lyrics | Music | Length |
|---|---|---|---|---|
| 1. | "Newpower Soul" | | New Power Generation; Hornheadz | 5:00 |
| 2. | "Mad Sex" | Prince; Kirk Johnson | New Power Generation; Hornheadz; DJ Brother Jules | 5:12 |
| 3. | "Until U're in My Arms Again" | | New Power Generation; The NPG Orchestra; Clare Fischer | 4:47 |
| 4. | "When U Love Somebody" | | New Power Generation; Pierre Baptiste; Clark Gayton; Wayne DuMaine | 5:57 |
| 5. | "Shoo-Bed-Ooh" | | Prince | 3:25 |
| 6. | "Push It Up" | Prince; Larry Graham, Jr.; Douglas Davis | New Power Generation; Larry Graham; Doug E. Fresh; Marva King; Chaka Khan; DJ Brother Jules | 5:30 |
| 7. | "Freaks On This Side" | | New Power Generation; Hornheadz; Kim Berry | 5:42 |
| 8. | "Come On" | | New Power Generation; Khan; Kat Dyson | 5:59 |
| 9. | "The One" | | New Power Generation; Fischer; The NPG Orchestra | 7:04 |
| 10. | "( Like) Funky Music" | Prince; Davis | New Power Generation; Doug E. Fresh | 4:31 |
| 49. | "Wasted Kisses" (hidden track, following silent tracks 11–48) | | Prince | 6:42 (2:58)* |
| Total length: | | | | 59:54 |

== Charts ==
Chart performance for Newpower Soul
| Chart (1998) | Peak position |
|---|---|
| Australian Albums (ARIA) | 47 |
| Austrian Albums (Ö3 Austria) | 24 |
| Belgian Albums (Ultratop Flanders) | 15 |
| Belgian Albums (Ultratop Wallonia) | 45 |
| Dutch Albums (Album Top 100) | 23 |
| French Albums (SNEP) | 45 |
| German Albums (Offizielle Top 100) | 34 |
| Norwegian Albums (VG-lista) | 40 |
| Swedish Albums (Sverigetopplistan) | 57 |
| Swiss Albums (Schweizer Hitparade) | 22 |
| UK Albums (Official Charts) | 38 |
| US Billboard 200 | 22 |
| US Top R&B/Hip-Hop Albums (Billboard) | 9 |
