= Exodus (New Power Generation album) =

Studio album by New Power Generation
- Released: March 27, 1995
- Recorded: May 1994; January 1995
- Genre: Funk
- Length: 1:06:15
- Language: English; Spanish
- Label: NPG
- Producer: New Power Generation (de facto Prince)

New Power Generation chronology
Goldnigga (1993)	Exodus (1995)	Newpower Soul (1998)

Singles from Exodus
- 1. "Get Wild" Released: March 20, 1995; 2. "The Good Life" Released: June 13, 1995 (US) August 7, 1995 (UK); 3. "Count the Days" Released: September 25, 1995

Exodus is the second studio album by the New Power Generation. Although the track listing boasts 21 tracks, many of them are narrative segues, leaving only nine actual songs. Of those, one is an instrumental. The album spawned three singles, though only one ("The Good Life") was released in the United States.

== Album concept significance ==
The album's title was seen as mysterious by most people, due to Prince's quirks and unusual behavior in various interviews given during promotion of the album. However, in an interview, former NPG dancer Mayte Garcia made a statement regarding the album's title and concept:

Well, you know, the Exodus ... you can look at in a lot of different ways. It's an exit from a lot of things, an exit from a way of thinking and a way of doing things to do something new. To do something other so, you know, we've taken off on this Exodus stuff and we're gonna make a mark out here and do some different things.

In the same interview, Morris Hayes added on to Mayte's statement and said:

Times are changing and you know I think people have to start understanding that as things progress, things, situations have to change. That's the natural progression of life. As things change, then you either change or you're left behind.

== Album background ==
While their previous album, Goldnigga was more hip hop-oriented, Exodus is more of a pure funk offering, strongly influenced by the sound of Parliament and P-Funk. This album still downplays Prince's involvement in the band, with "Tora Tora", another in the long line of Prince's personas, as a background vocalist whose face is covered with a red veil (evidenced in the video of "The Good Life"). The front man for the NPG on this release is bass player Sonny T. who handles the lead vocals. Prince does provide lead vocals on two tracks, "Return of the Bump Squad" and "The Exodus Has Begun" using manipulated vocals and is clearly present on many of the spoken segues, although sometimes using a disguised accent.

== Track listing ==
All tracks are written by Prince.

No.	Title	Length
1.	"NPG Operator Intro"	0:35
2.	"Get Wild"	4:32
3.	"Segue"	0:38
4.	"DJ Gets Jumped"	0:22
5.	"New Power Soul"	4:10
6.	"DJ Seduces Sonny"	0:38
7.	"Segue"	0:43
8.	"Count the Days"	3:24
9.	"The Good Life"	5:48
10.	"Cherry, Cherry"	4:45
11.	"Segue"	0:18
12.	"Return of the Bump Squad"	7:20
13.	"Mashed Potato Girl Intro"	0:21
14.	"Segue"	3:00
15.	"Big Fun"	7:26
16.	"New Power Day"	3:49
17.	"Segue"	0:14
18.	"Hallucination Rain"	5:49
19.	"NPG Bum Rush the Ship"	1:40
20.	"The Exodus Has Begun"	10:06
21.	"Outro"	0:37
Total length:		1:06:15

== Singles ==
- "Get Wild" CD single
1. "Get Wild" (single mix) – 4:51
2. "Beautiful Girl" – 4:32
3. "Hallucination Rain" – 5:52
- "Get Wild" CD maxi single
1. "Get Wild" (Money Maker) – 6:01
2. "Get Wild" (Kirky J's Get Wild) – 6:38
3. "Get Wild" (Club Mix) – 5:04
4. "Get Wild" (Get Wild in the House) – 6:14
5. "Get Wild" – 4:33
6. "Get Wild" (Money Maker Funky Jazz Mix) – 6:20
- "The Good Life"
1. "The Good Life" (Platinum People Edit) – 4:12
2. "The Good Life" (Platinum People Mix) – 6:40
3. "The Good Life" (Dancing Divaz Miz) – 6:40
4. "The Good Life" (Bullets Go Bang Remix) – 5:14
5. "The Good Life" (Big City Remix) – 5:05
6. "The Good Life" (album version) – 5:48
- "Count the Days"
1. "Count the Days" (edit) – 3:29
2. "Count the Days" (album version) – 3:25
3. "New Power Soul" – 4:11

== Charts ==
Chart performance for Exodus
Chart (1995)	Peak position
Belgian Albums (Ultratop Flanders)	27
Dutch Albums (Album Top 100)	31
Swiss Albums (Schweizer Hitparade)	34
UK Albums (OCC)	11
