= The Gold Experience =

Studio album by Prince
- Released: September 26, 1995
- Recorded: January 1993; September 1993 – July 1994
- Genres: Funk rock; funk; hard rock
- Length: 65:14
- Languages: English; Spanish
- Labels: Warner Bros.; NPG
- Producer: Prince

Prince chronology
The Versace Experience: Prelude 2 Gold (1995)	The Gold Experience (1995)	Girl 6 (1996)

Singles from The Gold Experience
- 1. "The Most Beautiful Girl in the World" Released: February 24, 1994; 2. " Hate U" Released: September 12, 1995; 3. "Gold" Released: November 27, 1995

The Gold Experience is the seventeenth studio album by American musician Prince. It was credited to his stage name at the time, an unpronounceable symbol (shown on the album cover), also known as the "Love Symbol".

The album was produced entirely by Prince and released on September 26, 1995, by NPG Records and Warner Bros. Records. The album charted at number 6 on the Billboard 200 and number 2 on the Top R&B Albums. The singles "The Most Beautiful Girl in the World", " Hate U", and "Gold" charted on the Billboard Hot 100 at numbers 3, 12, and 88 respectively.

On June 18, 2022, The Gold Experience was reissued for Record Store Day 2022. The reissue on vinyl is a replica of the original translucent gold expanded, limited promo album from 1995. The day prior, the album's CD version was rereleased. This marked the first time the complete album had been reissued following the legal battle over "The Most Beautiful Girl in the World".

== Reception ==
Professional ratings
Review scores
Source	Rating
AllMusic	4/5 stars
Blender	4/5 stars
Entertainment Weekly	A−
The Guardian	4/5 stars
Los Angeles Times	4/4 stars
NME	7/10
Pitchfork	8.1/10
Q	3/5 stars
Rolling Stone	4/5 stars
The Village Voice	A

The Gold Experience sold 500,000 copies in the United States and peaked at number six on the Billboard 200, failing to meet the record label's commercial expectations. According to biographer Jason Draper, it may have undersold because Prince was losing touch with younger listeners and also because his contractual dispute with Warner Bros. Records overshadowed the album's promotion, which he had done well before it was released.

Nonetheless, The Gold Experience was a success with critics. Melody Maker called it Prince's best record in years, while Vibe said it was his best since Sign o' the Times in 1987. In The Village Voice, Robert Christgau wrote that it showcased not only the unbridled artistry displayed on his other records but also "a renewal. It's as sex-obsessed as ever, only with more juice—'Shhh' and '319' especially pack the kind of porno jolt sexy music rarely gets near and hard music never does." He believed its best songs, specifically "Endorphinmachine" and "P Control", "funk and rock as outrageously and originally as anything he's ever recorded". Jon Pareles was less enthusiastic in The New York Times, finding most of the songs to be minor successes and calling it "a proficient album, not a startling one; most of its songs are variations and retreads of previous Prince efforts."

The Gold Experience was voted the 30th best album of 1995 in the Pazz & Jop, an annual poll of American critics published by The Village Voice. Christgau, the poll's supervisor, ranked it 10th best in his own year-end list. In a retrospective review, Keith Harris from Blender cited The Gold Experience as the best album Prince recorded in the 1990s, "a mix of newly stripped-down funk and delicate balladry that reasserts his dynamic range".

Several people speculated that the song "Billy Jack Bitch" was written about a Minneapolis Star Tribune gossip columnist known as "CJ". Prince denied the song was about the columnist when CJ herself interviewed him.

== In popular culture ==
The Japanese broadcast of the K-1 World Grand Prix kickboxing tournament on the Fuji Television network used "Endorphinmachine" as its theme song from 1995 to 2020, and "Gold" as its ending theme.

The Mexican television network Televisa used the first seconds of the song "We March" for its curtain call from 2003 to 2015 in its programs and productions.

The Stand Gold Experience from the fifth part of the Japanese Manga/Anime series Jojo's Bizarre Adventure is named after the album.

== Track listing ==
All tracks are written by Prince, except where noted.

The Gold Experience track listing
No.	Title	Writer(s)	Length
1.	"P. Control"		5:59
2.	"NPG Operator"		0:10
3.	"Endorphinmachine"		4:07
4.	"Shhh"		7:18
5.	"We March"	Prince; Nona Gaye	4:49
6.	"NPG Operator"		0:16
7.	"The Most Beautiful Girl in the World"		4:25
8.	"Dolphin"		4:59
9.	"NPG Operator"		0:18
10.	"Now"		4:30
11.	"NPG Operator"		0:31
12.	"319"		3:05
13.	"NPG Operator"		0:10
14.	"Shy"		5:04
15.	"Billy Jack Bitch"	Prince; Michael B. Nelson	5:32
16.	" Hate U"		5:54
17.	"NPG Operator"		0:44
18.	"Gold"		7:23
Total length:			65:14

Special vinyl edition bonus tracks
No.	Title	Length
19.	" Hate U" (extended remix)	6:17
20.	" Hate U" (LP version)	6:08
21.	" Hate U" (quiet night mix)	3:56
22.	" Hate U" (single version with guitar solo)	4:25
23.	" Hate U" (single version without guitar solo)	3:48
Total length:		1:29:48

=== Notes ===
- Every use of the pronoun "I" throughout the song titles and liner notes is represented by a stylized "👁" symbol. This symbol is commonly transliterated as "Eye" amongst Prince fans, as "👁 No" and "I Wish U Heaven" both appeared on Lovesexy.

== Personnel ==
Credits adapted from Benoît Clerc.

=== Musicians ===
- Prince – lead vocals (tracks 1, 3–5, 7–8, 12, 14–16, 18), rap (tracks 1, 3, 10), backing vocals (tracks 1, 3–5, 7–8, 10, 12, 15–16), spoken voice (track 16), electric guitar (tracks 3–4, 7–8, 10, 12, 14–16, 18), acoustic guitar (tracks 7–8, 14, 18), bass (tracks 1, 5, 7, 10, 14), drums (track 1, 7, 10), percussion (tracks 1, 3, 7), finger snapping (track 1), tambourine (track 5, 10, 14), shaker (track 18), synthesizers (tracks 1, 5, 7, 14), piano (track 7, 10), Fender rhodes piano (track 15), programming (tracks 1, 5, 7, 10)
- Mayte – spoken vocals (tracks 1, 3, 5), moans (track 4), choruses (track 4)
- Rain Ivana (as NPG Operator) – spoken voice (tracks 2, 6, 9, 11, 13, 15–18)
- Tommy Barbarella – synthesizers (tracks 3–4, 8, 12, 15–16, 18)
- Michael B. – drums (tracks 3–4, 8, 12, 15–16, 18)
- Mr. Hayes – Hammond organ (tracks 3–4, 15–16), synthesizers (tracks 8, 12, 18)
- Sonny T. – bass (tracks 3, 4, 8, 15–16, 18), vocals (track 5), backing vocals (track 5)
- Nona Gaye – co-lead vocals (track 5), backing vocals (track 5)
- Kirk Johnson – programming (track 5)
- Ricky Peterson – additional synthesizers (tracks 5, 7, 12, 16, 18), sound effects (track 7)
- James Behringer – additional guitar (track 7)
- Brian Gallagher – tenor saxophone (tracks 10, 12, 15)
- Kathy Jensen – baritone saxophone (tracks 10, 12, 15)
- Dave Jensen, Steve Strand – trumpet (tracks 10, 12, 15)
- Michael B. Nelson – trombone (tracks 10, 12, 15), brass arranger (track 15)

=== Technical ===
- Prince – producer, recording engineer
- Ricky Peterson – co-producer (tracks 5, 7, 12, 16, 18)
- Kirk Johnson – co-producer (track 5)
- David "Chronic Freeze" Friedlander, Ray Hahnfeldt, Tom Tucker, Steve Durkee – recording engineers (track 7)
- Shane T Keller – assistant recording engineer

== Singles ==
- "The Most Beautiful Girl in the World" (#3 US, #2 US R&B, #1 UK, #1 Australia)
- " Hate U" (#12 US, #3 US R&B, #20 UK)
- "Gold" (#88 US, #92 US R&B, #10 UK)

Another track, "Shhh", charted from The Gold Experience in July 1994; it was not the album version, but rather a live version performed on The Beautiful Experience TV special, which aired in 1994. It received some R&B airplay, causing it to chart and peak at #62 on the US Hot R&B/Hip-Hop Airplay chart.

== Charts ==
=== Weekly charts ===
1995 weekly chart performance for The Gold Experience
Chart (1995)	Peak position
Australian Albums (ARIA)	13
Austrian Albums (Ö3 Austria)	28
Belgian Albums (Ultratop Flanders)	5
Danish Albums (Hitlisten)	8
Dutch Albums (Album Top 100)	3
Finnish Albums (Suomen virallinen lista)	24
German Albums (Offizielle Top 100)	24
Norwegian Albums (VG-lista)	12
Spanish Albums (AFYVE)	17
Swedish Albums (Sverigetopplistan)	11
Swiss Albums (Schweizer Hitparade)	7
UK Albums (Official Charts)	4
US Billboard 200	6
US Top R&B/Hip-Hop Albums (Billboard)	2

2022 weekly chart performance for The Gold Experience
Chart (2022)	Peak position
Irish Albums (IRMA)	86
Japanese Albums (Oricon)	33
Japanese Hot Albums (Billboard Japan)	82
Portuguese Albums (AFP)	37
Scottish Albums (Official Charts)	10
UK Albums (Official Charts)	46
US Billboard 200	47
US Top Catalog Albums (Billboard)	10
US Vinyl Albums (Billboard)	4
UK R&B Albums (Official Charts)	1

2023 weekly chart performance for The Gold Experience
Chart (2023)	Peak position
Belgian Albums (Ultratop Wallonia)	178

=== Year-end charts ===
1995 year-end chart performance for The Gold Experience
Chart (1995)	Position
Belgian Albums (Ultratop Flanders)	85
Dutch Albums (Album Top 100)	87
US Top R&B/Hip-Hop Albums (Billboard)	88

== Certifications ==
Certifications for The Gold Experience
Region	Certification	Certified units/sales
Denmark (IFPI Danmark)	Gold	10,000^{‡}
United Kingdom (BPI)	Gold	100,000^{^}
United States (RIAA)	Gold	500,000^{^}
^{^} Shipments figures based on certification alone.^{‡} Sales+streaming figures based on certification alone.
