= The Most Beautiful Girl in the World (Prince song) =

1994 single by Prince

Single by Prince

from the album The Beautiful Experience and The Gold Experience
- B-side: "Beautiful"; "Beautiful" (extended club mix); "Beautiful Beats"
- Released: February 24, 1994
- Recorded: September 20, 1993
- Studio: Paisley Park, Chanhassen
- Genre: R&B; soul-pop
- Length: 4:37 (original mix); 4:07 (single edit); 4:25 (Gold Experience version)
- Label: NPG; Bellmark
- Songwriter: Prince
- Producers: Prince; Ricky Peterson

Prince singles chronology
"Controversy" (1993)	"The Most Beautiful Girl in the World" (1994)	"Letitgo" (1994)

Music video
- "The Most Beautiful Girl in the World" on YouTube

"The Most Beautiful Girl in the World" is a song by American musician Prince, released in various forms on the 1994 EP The Beautiful Experience and later on his seventeenth studio album, The Gold Experience (1995). In his singles chronology, it was his third major release since changing his stage name to the unpronounceable "Love Symbol". It was his second release along with the EP after changing his name.

With the consent of Prince's usual record distributor Warner Bros. Records, the song was released by NPG Records in North America and Edel Music in the rest of the world and independently distributed by Bellmark Records in the US, under the control and guidance of Music of Life, as a one-off single, topping five different charts. It also remains Prince's only number one single on the UK Singles Chart, and was shortly followed by the release of The Beautiful Experience that also charted on No. 18 in the UK. The version that was released on The Gold Experience is a different mix of the song. Its music video was directed by Prince and Antoine Fuqua, depicting a collage of girls and women watching footage of themselves living their fantasies mixed with Prince performing for them. "The Most Beautiful Girl in the World" was nominated in the category for Tune of the Year at the 1995 International Dance Awards 1995.

== Development ==
The original track is a slow-grooving ballad that serenades a beautiful woman, his soon-to-be fiancée, Mayte Garcia. The song was played during the Miss USA pageant in 1994, but not in full. It was widely advertised in news and trade magazines that a new song from Prince would be premiered at the pageant. The ads had Prince sitting in a chair with a hat pulled down over his face, and Garcia standing next to his chair. The song was officially released on February 24, 1994. It later appeared on The Gold Experience.

The version on The Gold Experience is remixed. The drums are more crisp in the mix, and there are slight instrumental changes, with the fade ending from the original mix being replaced with a definite ending. There are also added sound effects and instrumental breaks in the second version. The spoken word bridge is slightly more robust as well. The song is still based in light guitar, keyboards and live drums. Although most of the song is sung in falsetto with Prince reaching some extremely high notes, the spoken word bridge has him using his regular voice as well as a lower baritone range in one small segment. This version was performed live during the 1994 World Music Awards ceremony.

== Chart performance ==
The song was a worldwide hit and established Prince's ability to succeed commercially under his new name, peaking at No. 3 on the Billboard Hot 100. It was certified gold by the RIAA and sold 700,000 copies domestically. However, the song was his last top 10 hit on the US Billboard Hot 100 during his lifetime.

In the UK the song became his first and only UK No. 1 single under any name as a performer. He did have two other UK number ones as a songwriter: the 1984 hit single "I Feel for You" covered by Chaka Khan and Sinéad O'Connor's 1990 cover of "Nothing Compares 2 U". Prince danced to his own song "The Most Beautiful Girl In The World" after the World Music Awards at an after show event with Kylie Minogue in 1994.

== Critical reception ==
AllMusic editor Daniel Browne complimented the song as a "dreamy slice of soul-pop" in the style of Delfonics mastermind Thom Bell. Another AllMusic editor, Stephen Thomas Erlewine, felt it has a "more immediate" melody, describing it as a "Philly soul tribute". Upon the single release, Troy J. Augusto from Cash Box commented, "Never one to sit idly by. Prince returns after a short sabbatical with this new funky single, released through a new deal with Al Bell's Bellmark Records". He also said, "Already making waves at urban and top-40 radio, this keyboard-heavy, lushly produced track breaks no new ground for Prince, but looks like a sure bet for chart success. Expect to hear this song of female worship at the junior prom come June." Greg Sandow from Entertainment Weekly described it as "buoyant". Lars Nielsen from Danish Gaffa named it a "pop-pearl". Caroline Sullivan from The Guardian complimented it as "rather wonderful", writing further, "The glossy, propulsive funk beat and falsetto vocal are the infectious mainspring of an unusually romantic celebration of femalekind. Delectable." In his weekly UK chart commentary, James Masterton felt this "gorgeous ballad" is "probably his most MOR recording since Diamonds and Pearls [and] proving that behind all the raunch and funk lies a soul talent that is second to none."

Chuck Campbell from Knoxville News Sentinel viewed it as "sappy" and "an unclever homage to an adored one." Mark Carlson from The Michigan Daily named it one of the "highlights" from the album, describing it as "super-sappy (yet somehow wonderful)". Alan Jones from Music Week gave it a top score of five out of five and named it Pick of the Week, remarking that it "is his most direct and accessible in ages. A love song which he renders in his prettiest falsetto, it's all over radio already, and is likely to make a huge impact on the main chart, as well as topping the indie listings." John Kilgo from The Network Forty felt it "may be Prince's strongest" since "Cream". Terry Staunton from NME described it as "a fairly bog standard ballad, sounding a little too much like Barry Gibb for my liking." A reviewer from Perthshire Advertiser called it a "stunning tune and a massive hit too!" Tim Marsh from Select remarked that the song displayed "a confident touch". Mark Sutherland from Smash Hits also gave it five out of five and named it Best New Single, writing, "He's back and he's still brilliant! Prince [...] returns with a shivery pop delight that's one of his sweetest records yet, ditching his usual perviness for some totally corny lyrics about lurve." He concluded that "this delightful ballad will have the whole world a-smooching."

== Retrospective response ==
In a 2020 retrospective review, Andy Healy from Albumism noted the song's "lush, rich serving of '70s soul and '90s pop." He added that everything about the song "is well crafted perfection", remarking that it "easily seduces the listener, it's at once romantic and passionate, and manages to just swirl around you, sweeping you away with its beauty." Tom Ewing of Freaky Trigger described it as a "high, heady, perfume-drunk ballad drawing from the well of Thom Bell's work with the Delfonics and Stylistics." He added further, "Prince disciplines himself, staying almost throughout at the absolute top of his register, a high-wire act he pulls off without a hitch but also without any moment which completely sells the decision. The music is opulent boudoir funk, the best line – "How can I get through days when I can't get through hours?" – is very good, and there's a casual classiness to the record."

In 2019, Alexis Petridis from The Guardian ranked it number 35 in his list of "Prince's 50 Greatest Singles – Ranked!", writing, "It is incredible that 'The Most Beautiful Girl in The World' is Prince’s only UK No 1, given the singles that preceded it. Nevertheless, it’s a deft homage to the super-soft 70s soul of the Delfonics and the Stylistics, both of whom he subsequently covered." Polish Porcys ranked it number five in their ranking of "100 Singles 1990-1999" in 2012. In 2020, Rolling Stone included it in their list of "25 Essential Prince Songs". An editor noted that "the gorgeous falsetto-steeped ballad has clean funk guitar touches and keyboards, but Prince lets his gift for melody do most of the work."

== Music video ==
The accompanying music video for "The Most Beautiful Girl in the World" was directed by Prince and American film director and producer Antoine Fuqua on January 29, 1994. It depicts a collage of girls and women, that are watching footage of themselves living their fantasies mixed with Prince performing the song for them in a special room. The video was filmed at Paisley Park Studios and debuted on Valentine's Day 1994. In December 1993, Prince had an ad placed in US, British, a Dutch and Spanish publication reading: “Eligible bachelor seeks the most beautiful girl in the world to spend the holidays with” and encouraged all interested to send videos and/or pictures to Paisley Park Studios. The material sent in response to the advertisement (reportedly, over 50,000 girls responded) was utilized for the video. Seven finalists were chosen to appear in the video while 30 semi-finalists were featured on the sleeve of the record.

At first the video's story was going to be a competition for the "title" of most beautiful woman in the world. Later, the story was reworked to be a celebration of every type of woman. Originally scheduled to be shot in Los Angeles City Hall on January 23, it was rescheduled to place in Minneapolis 6 days later, due to an earthquake in California. American educator Marva Collins makes a cameo appearance, as an elderly woman watching her black and white students interact peacefully. Also Nona Gaye and Vanessa Marcil have cameo appearances in the video. Actress Rita Worlock plays a comedian with a red wig, watching herself doing a Joan Rivers type of thing. Other women appearing in the video are: a bride watching herself getting married, a curvy woman viewing her fantasy of having a singing career, a female swimmer watching herself getting a medal, a mom reliving giving birth to her child, and a girl with dreads and top hat watching herself as a director on a set.

== Plagiarism case ==
There was a long-running copyright dispute from 1995 to 2015, and a court in Italy ruled that Prince had plagiarized the song, giving writing credit to those other than Prince. The outcome of this dispute resulted in the removal of the song from all digital storefronts and streaming platforms. Bruno Bergonzi and Michele Vicino co-wrote the song "Takin' Me to Paradise", published in 1983 by Chappell & Co., now known as Warner Chappell Music. An Italian court ruled in 2003 that Prince's "The Most Beautiful Girl in the World" had plagiarized the song by the two Italian writers. Bergonzi and Vicino won on appeal in 2007. The third and final sentence, by the Court of Cassation of Rome, was given in May 2015. As of the final sentence, the Italian collecting society SIAE recognizes Bergonzi and Vicino as the authors of the song's music. In 2022, Prince’s estate and the songwriters reached an agreement over "The Most Beautiful Girl in the World", which allowed the song to be reissued on streaming and physical media.

== Track listings ==
- Single
1. "The Most Beautiful Girl in the World" (single edit) – 4:06
2. "Beautiful" (single edit) – 3:54
- United Kingdom 12-inch
1. "The Most Beautiful Girl in the World" – 4:07
2. "Beautiful" – 3:57
3. "Beautiful" (extended club mix by Simon Harris) – 6:25
4. "Beautiful Beats" – 3:30

== Personnel ==
- Prince – all vocals and instruments, except where noted
- Ricky Peterson – additional keyboards (as "Ricky P.")
- James "Jimi" Behringer – additional guitar
- Michael Bland – drums

== Charts ==
=== Weekly charts ===
Weekly chart performance for "The Most Beautiful Girl in the World"
Chart (1994–1995)	Peak position
Australia (ARIA)	1
Austria (Ö3 Austria Top 40)	5
Belgium (Ultratop 50 Flanders)	4
Canada Top Singles (RPM)	3
Denmark (IFPI)	1
El Salvador (UPI)	8
Europe (Eurochart Hot 100)	2
Europe (European AC Radio)	1
Europe (European Dance Radio)	23
Europe (European Hit Radio)	1
Finland (Suomen virallinen lista)	5
France (SNEP)	5
Germany (GfK)	9
Iceland (Íslenski Listinn Topp 40)	15
Ireland (IRMA)	4
Israel (Israeli Singles Chart)	17
Italy (Musica e dischi)	9
Netherlands (Dutch Top 40)	1
Netherlands (Single Top 100)	1
New Zealand (Recorded Music NZ)	1
Norway (VG-lista)	4
Scottish Singles Sales (Official Charts)	5
Spain (AFYVE)	1
Sweden (Sverigetopplistan)	13
Switzerland (Schweizer Hitparade)	1
UK Singles (Official Charts)	1
UK Airplay (Music Week)	1
UK Dance (Music Week)	26
UK Indie (Music Week)	1
US Billboard Hot 100	3
US Dance Singles Sales (Billboard)	13
US Hot R&B/Hip-Hop Songs (Billboard)	2
US Pop Airplay (Billboard)	3
US Rhythmic Airplay (Billboard)	3
US Cash Box Top 100	1

=== Year-end charts ===
Year-end chart performance for "The Most Beautiful Girl in the World"
Chart (1994)	Position
Australia (ARIA)	23
Belgium (Ultratop 50 Flanders)	16
Brazil (Mais Tocadas)	53
Canada Top Singles (RPM)	41
Europe (Eurochart Hot 100)	17
Europe (European Hit Radio)	3
France (SNEP)	28
Germany (Media Control)	46
Iceland (Íslenski Listinn Topp 40)	95
Netherlands (Dutch Top 40)	6
Netherlands (Single Top 100)	3
New Zealand (RIANZ)	7
Sweden (Topplistan)	76
Switzerland (Schweizer Hitparade)	15
UK Singles (OCC)	24
UK Airplay (Music Week)	3
US Billboard Hot 100	19
US Hot R&B Singles (Billboard)	17
US Cash Box Top 100	7

=== Decade-end charts ===
Chart (1990–1999)	Rank
Netherlands (Dutch Top 40)	71

== Certifications ==
Certifications for "The Most Beautiful Girl in the World"
Region	Certification	Certified units/sales
Australia (ARIA)	Platinum	70,000^{^}
New Zealand (RMNZ)	Gold	5,000^{*}
United Kingdom (BPI)	Silver	200,000^{^}
United States (RIAA)	Gold	500,000^{^}
^{*} Sales figures based on certification alone.^{^} Shipments figures based on certification alone.

== Release history ==
Release dates and formats for "The Most Beautiful Girl in the World"
Region	Date	Format(s)	Label(s)	Ref.
United States	February 24, 1994	12-inch vinyl; CD; cassette	NPG; Bellmark	
United Kingdom	March 28, 1994	7-inch vinyl; 12-inch vinyl; CD; cassette	NPG	

== Mayte version ==
Mayte Garcia later recorded her own version called "The Most Beautiful Boy in the World". The song appears on her album Child of the Sun. It has the same instrumental backing track with extra reverb, and her vocals, with a few slight ad-lib changes. Garcia also recorded a Spanish version of this song entitled "¿Quieres Ser El Mas Bello De Este Mundo?". It was released by NPG Records.

== Cover versions ==
- In 2003, pianist Alex Bugnon covered the song on his album Southern Living.

== Bibliography ==
- Uptown: The Vault – The Definitive Guide to the Musical World of Prince: Nilsen Publishing 2004, ISBN 91-631-5482-X
