= Mayte Garcia =

American dancer, actress, and singer (born 1973)

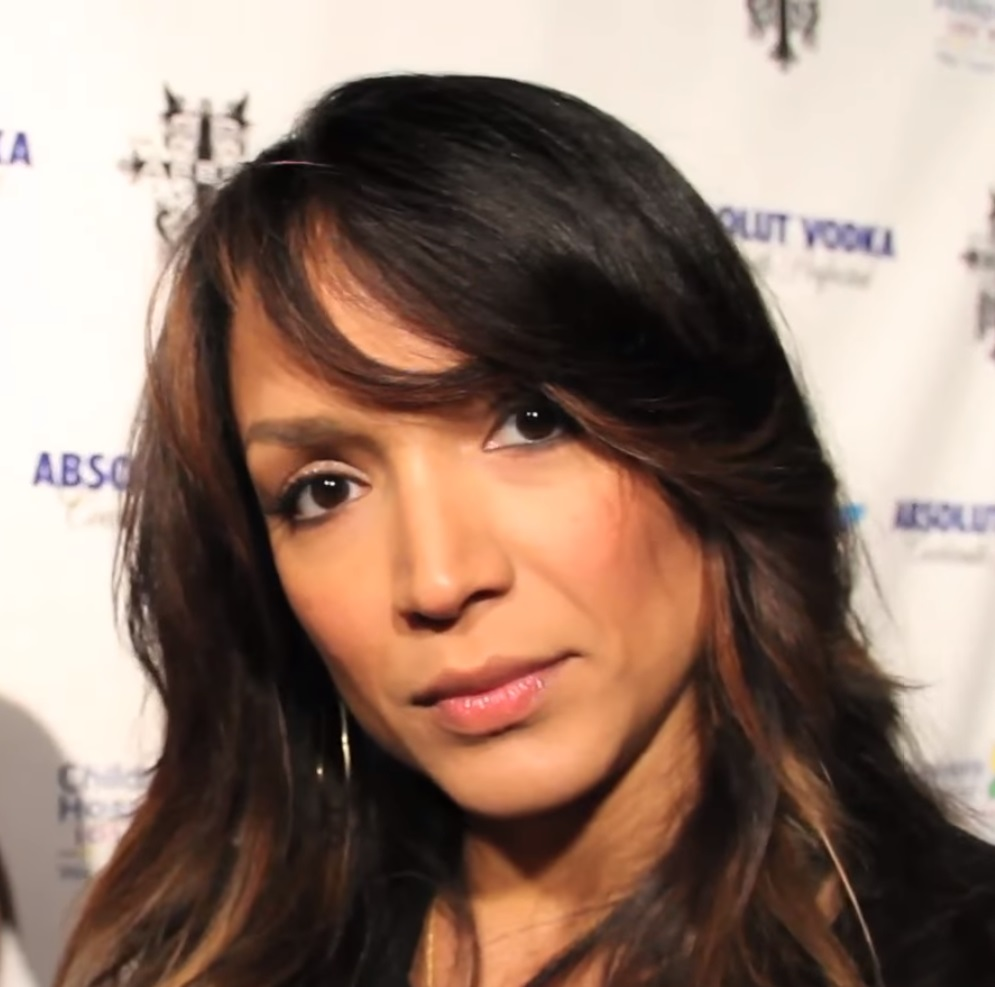
- Garcia in 2013
- Born: Mayte Jannell Garcia; November 12, 1973 (age 53); Fort Rucker, Alabama, U.S.
- Occupations: Dancer; singer; actress
- Years active: 1990–present
- Spouse: Prince (m. 1996; div. 2000)
- Partner(s): Niels Lan Doky (2022–present; engaged)
- Children: 2

Mayte Jannell Garcia (/ˈmaɪteɪ/ MY-tay; born November 12, 1973) is an American dancer, actress, and singer. She has worked with various music artists and was married to Prince for four years.

== Early life ==
Garcia was born on November 12, 1973, at Fort Rucker, Alabama, an army base. Garcia's parents are both of Puerto Rican descent. Her father John was a United States military pilot, and her mother Janelle (also known as Nelly) was a dancer. Garcia and her older sister, Janice, grew up in Germany and the United States. Garcia spent the summers of her childhood with her extended family in San Juan, Puerto Rico. She began belly dancing at age three. On May 12, 1981, at 7 years old, Garcia appeared on the American television program That's Incredible! as the world's youngest professional belly dancer.

As a teenager, Garcia became a prima ballerina with the Wiesbaden Ballet. She graduated from General H.H. Arnold High School in Wiesbaden, Germany.

== Career and professional relationship with Prince ==
Garcia came to the attention of Prince in 1990 when her mother submitted a video cassette of Garcia's performance to a dancer in hopes they would pass the tape on to Prince. Prince met Garcia within minutes after viewing the video while on tour in Germany. Garcia describes the process by which she became a part of Prince's performance group, The New Power Generation (NPG), as follows on her official website: "Mayte's mother convinced some members of the New Power Generation to give her [audition] video to Prince. Ten minutes later, Prince had invited her backstage, and for two years, the two kept in touch. Finally, when she was eighteen, Prince asked her to be a part of the NPG".

In 1992, Garcia was hired to dance during his Diamonds and Pearls Tour. She became the focus of his next album, Love Symbol (1992). Garcia assumed the guise of an Egyptian princess for the concept album and the 3 Chains o' Gold video compilation. She was a member of the NPG from 1992 to 1996. Afterwards, she remained an associate of the NPG, dancing occasionally during Prince's tours in 1998 and 1999. In 1995, Prince produced an album for her, titled Child of the Sun, for a European release on his NPG Records label. This album had one single released overseas, "If I Love U 2 Nite".

In 1997, Garcia was the artistic director of the New Power Generation Dance Company on their Around the World in a Day tour. She also directed the music video for "The One" for Prince. In addition, Garcia directed music videos for Chaka Khan and Graham Central Station. She choreographed the belly dancing routines for Britney Spears' "I'm a Slave 4 U" music video, as well as Spears' performance of the song at the 2001 MTV Video Music Awards. During this period, Garcia dated drummer Tommy Lee. She sang on his album Never a Dull Moment (2002) and she toured with him as a dancer.

=== Films ===
Film appearances include the Hindi film Dus (2005) as a dancer, and Firehouse Dog (2007). In 2005, she appeared as a flight attendant in the Spanish language film El Vacilon.

Garcia was offered the role of Marilyn in the film Just like a Woman (2012) as well as to be its main dance choreographer, but declined due to scheduling conflicts. The role was later given to Sienna Miller.

=== Television ===
Garcia has guest starred on various television series, such as 2 Broke Girls, Psych, The Closer, Las Vegas, Nip/Tuck, and Keeping Up with the Kardashians. She appeared twice as a reporter on the 2007 ABC television series Big Shots. She had a recurring role on Lifetime's Army Wives (2008–2009) as Jennifer Connor. She starred on Sí TV's 2004–05 program Across the Hall with Eric Cubiche. In 2009, she was a judge on the first season of Oxygen's Dance Your Ass Off. On June 25, 2012, she began appearing as a principal cast member on VH1's reality show Hollywood Exes. She was considered for the role of Nina Holiday on the television series Rizzoli & Isles when the character was originally known as Nina Hernandez.

=== Books ===
In 2017, Garcia released a book titled The Most Beautiful: My Life with Prince about her professional and personal relationship with Prince.

== Personal life ==
Garcia lives in Las Vegas, Nevada, with her daughter Gia, whom she adopted in 2013.

Mayte has multiple sclerosis, an autoimmune disease that affects the central nervous system. The symptoms began in 2010 and included optic neuritis, resulting in temporary partial vision loss. Her treatment program, along with a healthy diet and exercise regimen, has stopped the MS symptoms from progressing, allowing her to live an active lifestyle and continue working.

=== Relationships ===
In 1990, 16-year-old Garcia met Prince backstage after he saw a tape of her dancing. After she graduated from high school in Germany at the age of 17, Prince became her legal guardian. Upon moving to Minneapolis, Prince and members of his team helped set her up with her own apartment. "At first, I stayed at the Sofitel, then they moved me to a nice little prairie house at the Country Suites, but I couldn't even make a cup of tea there, so they got me an apartment and rented furniture," she said. When she was 19, Prince instructed her to get on birth control, and the two began a sexual relationship. They married on February 14, 1996.

Their only child, Amiir, was born with Pfeiffer syndrome type 2 on October 16, 1996. He was unable to breathe without a ventilator and died six days after his birth. A week later, the couple was interviewed on The Oprah Winfrey Show, where they pretended their son was still alive. According to Garcia, they were unable to process his death. "We believed he was going to come back, that souls come back. We didn't want to acknowledge he was gone," she said. Depressed from the loss of her son, Garcia contemplated suicide, but the affection of her dog, Mia, stopped her. After a subsequent miscarriage, their marriage deteriorated and they divorced in 2000.

Garcia dated choreographer Wade Robson from 2000 until 2001.

Garcia dated drummer Tommy Lee from heavy metal band Mötley Crüe for two years. In 2002, Lee proposed to Garcia before a performance in Fort Wayne, Indiana. They ended their engagement in 2003.

In August 2022 she met pianist Niels Lan Doky, and after dating for a year, they planned to marry in October 2025.

== Discography ==
=== Studio albums ===
- Child of the Sun (1995)

=== Singles ===
- "Broken Wings" (1992)
- "Too Dramatic" (1993)
- "The Most Beautiful Boy in the World" (1994)
- "If Eye Love U 2night" (1995)
- "Rhythm of Your Heart" (1998)
