= Nude Tour =

1990 concert tour by Prince

- Tour by Prince
- Location: Europe; Asia
- Associated album: Batman
- Start date: June 2, 1990
- End date: September 10, 1990
- Legs: 2
- No. of shows: 51 in Europe; 5 in Asia; 56 in total (63 scheduled)

Prince concert chronology
- Lovesexy Tour (1988–89); Nude Tour (1990); Diamonds and Pearls Tour (1992)

The Nude Tour was a greatest-hits concert tour by American recording artist Prince. While his previous tour had drawn critical praise, the high cost of the concert tour production made it a financial disappointment; thus, Prince eliminated much of the excessiveness of the previous tour to be more financially viable. To make the tour as cost effective as possible, Prince decided not to tour in the U.S. this time, and thus he did not return to performing in North America until the Act I Tour in 1993.

== Background ==
Unlike the previous year's Lovesexy Tour, the Nude Tour promised a stripped-down, back to basics concert that saw Prince eliminate many of the excessive and expensive set designs that were produced for the Sign o' the Times and Lovesexy tours, thus the "Nude" moniker. The setlist was reduced to a limited number of his hits from the 1980s with a few tracks from the Batman and then-forthcoming Graffiti Bridge albums, resulting in all the songs being played in their entirety and much shorter shows. In a move to promote a more youth-friendly image, as well as cut costs, Prince chose to eliminate the veteran horn section from the band. According to academic Joseph Vogel, "The new image was clear: Prince wanted to present as young, black, and hip."

Although Prince had previously expressed negative views toward rap music on The Black Album (which, at the time, had not been released but had been widely bootlegged), he included rapping by Tony Mosley (known as Tony M.) in the song "The Future" during the Nude Tour.

== Opening act ==
- Jenny Morris
- Mavis Staples
- The Naked Mazurs
- Loïs Lane

== Band lineup ==
New Power Generation

- Levi Seacer Jr.: Bass
- Miko Weaver: Guitar
- Michael Bland: Drums
- Doctor Fink: Keyboards
- Rosie Gaines: Vocals / Keyboards / Dance
- Tony M.: Rap Vocals / Dance
- Kirk Johnson: Vocals / Dance / Percussion
- Damon Dickson: Dance

Tony M., Kirk Johnson, and Damon Dickson were referred to as the Game Boyz.

== Set list ==
This set list is based on an average setlist of the entire, it does not represent the entire tour.

1. "DAT Intro" (prerecorded samples of various hits)
2. "The Future"
3. "1999"
4. "Housequake" (contains excerpts of "Sexy Dancer")
5. "Kiss" (contains excerpts of "Let's Jam It")
6. "Purple Rain"
7. "Take Me with U"
8. "Alphabet St." (contains excerpts of "It Takes Two" and "The Latest Fashion")
9. "The Question of U" (contains excerpts of "Electric Man")
10. "Controversy" (contains excerpts of "D.M.S.R.")
11. "Do Me, Baby"
12. "Ain't No Way" (Rosie Gaines solo)
13. "Nothing Compares 2 U"
14. "Batdance"
15. "Partyman" (contains excerpts of "What Have You Done for Me Lately")

Encore

16. "Baby I'm a Star" (contains excerpts of "Respect")

Alterations

- "A Song for You" was performed in replacement of "Ain't No Way" on the second Rotterdam show, the Copenhagen show, the second Hamburg show, the Berlin show, the Paris show, the second and fourth Birmingham shows, the second Stockholm show, and the Lausanne show.
- "Little Red Corvette" was performed before "Batdance" and on rare occasion before "Purple Rain" on the second Rotterdam show, the second Hamburg show, the Berlin show, the Paris show, the second and fourth Birmingham shows, the Mannheim show, the second Stockholm show, the Lausanne show, the second Tokyo show, the Nishinomiya show, the Sapporo show and the Yokohama show.
- "Venus De Milo" was performed on piano before "The Question of U" as a medley on the Kiel show, the Berlin show, the first, fourteenth, fifteenth and sixteenth London shows, the first and fourth Birmingham shows, the Basel show, the Rome show, the Heerenveen show, the Mannheim show, the Gothenburg show, the second Stockholm show, the Nice show, the Manchester show, and all Japan shows.
- "Raspberry Beret" was performed before or after "Purple Rain" on the second Hamburg show, the sixteenth London show, the Nishinomiya show, the Sapporo show, and the Yokohama show.
- "Do Me, Baby" was not performed on both of the Rotterdam shows, the Copenhagen show, the Kiel show, the first Hamburg show, the third, fifth, seventh, eighth, and eleventh London shows, the second, third and fourth Birmingham shows, the Basel show, the second Stockholm show, and the Lausanne show.
- "Under the Cherry Moon (instrumental)" was performed on piano before "The Question of U" as a medley on the Berlin show, the first, and fourteenth London shows, the fourth Birmingham show, the Basel show, the Rome show, the Madrid show, the Heerenveen show, the second Dortmund show, the Mannheim show, the Gothenburg show, the second Stockholm show, the Lausanne show, the Nice show, the Manchester show, the second Tokyo show, and the Yokohama show.
- "Don't Make Me Pay For His Mistakes" and "Blues in C (If I Had A Harem)" was performed after "Take Me With U" on the first, sixth, ninth, tenth, and fifteenth London shows, the first and second Birmingham shows, the Cava de' Tirreni show, the Madrid show, the Werchter show, the second Dortmund show, the first Stockholm show, the Nice show, and the Manchester show.
- "We Can Funk" was performed in a medley with "Baby I'm A Star" on the first and second London shows, the Heerenveen show, and the Nice show.
- "Irresistible Bitch" was performed in the encore on the first and second London shows.
- A medley of "Respect" and "Rescue Me" was performed by Rosie Gaines during the encore on the second London show.
- "A Case of U" was performed on piano before "The Question of U" on the third London show.
- A cover of Joni Mitchell's "Blue Motel Room" was performed on piano before "The Question of U" on the fifth, sixth and seventh London shows.
- "When Doves Cry" was performed in replacement of "Controversy" and on rare occasions it was performed after "Partyman" and closed the main show on the third and fourth Birmingham show, the Cork show, the twelfth, the fourteenth and fifteenth London shows, the Basel show, the Rome show, the Madrid show, the Barcelona show, the second Stockholm show, the Lausanne show, the Manchester show, and all Japan shows.
- "Bambi" was performed after "Take Me With U" on the eleventh, twelfth, thirteenth, and fourteenth London shows, the fourth Birmingham show, the Barcelona show, the Gothenburg show, the second Stockholm show, and the second Tokyo show.
- A "The Question of U" intro was played on piano in a medley before "The Question of U" on the Basel show, the Rome show, the Madrid show, the Heerenveen show, the second Dortmund show, the Gothenburg show, the second Stockholm show, the Lausanne show, the thirteenth, fourteenth, and sixteenth London shows, the Manchester show, the second Tokyo show, the Sapporo show, and the Yokohama show.
- "An Honest Man" was performed on piano in a medley before "The Question of U" on the Madrid show, the second Dortmund show, the thirteenth and fifteenth London shows.
- "Batdance" was not performed on the fourteenth London show
- An instrumental version of "The Arms of Orion" was performed on piano in a medley before "The Question of U" on the Lausanne show.
- "Baby I'm A Star" was not performed on the Manchester show
- "Jerk Out" was performed after "Take Me With U" on the Nishinomiya
- "Partyman" was not performed on the fifteenth and sixteenth London shows, the first Tokyo show and the Nishinomiya show.
- "Thieves in the Temple" closed the show in Yokohama.
- "Nothing Compares 2 U" was not performed on the second Hamburg show, the eighth London show, the fourth Birmingham show, the second Stockholm show, the Lausanne show, the second Tokyo show, the Sapporo show, the Nishinomiya show and the Yokohama show.

== Tour dates ==
List of 1990 concerts
Date	City	Country	Venue	Attendance	Revenue
June 2	Rotterdam	Netherlands	Stadion Feijenoord	80,920 / 89,230	$2,029,473
June 3	Rotterdam	Netherlands	Stadion Feijenoord	80,920 / 89,230	$2,029,473
June 5 (Note: Originally scheduled for May 15.)	Copenhagen	Denmark	Gentofte Stadion	18,128 / 18,128	—
June 6	Kiel	Germany	Ostseehalle	11,500 / 11,500	$315,790
June 7 (Note: Originally scheduled to take place at Ostseehalle, Kiel, on May 17.)	Hamburg	Germany	Alsterdorfer Sporthalle	14,000 / 14,000	$813,540
June 9	Hamburg	Germany	Alsterdorfer Sporthalle	14,000 / 14,000	$813,540
June 10	Hanover	Germany	Niedersachsenstadion	37,000 / 37,000	$1,128,870
June 12	Berlin	Germany	Waldbühne	22,560 / 23,000	$702,067
June 13	Dortmund	Germany	Westfalenhallen	26,109 / 26,109 (Note: This box office score data is representative of both shows on June 13 & August 6)	$2,382,446
June 14	Munich	Germany	Olympiastadion	52,900 / 52,900	$1,573,246
June 16 (Note: Originally set to take place at Palace of Versailles in Versailles, but was moved to Paris.)	Paris	France	Parc des Princes	45,677 / 45,677	$1,911,125
June 17 (Note: Originally set to take place at Palace of Versailles in Versailles, but was moved to Paris then later moved to Lille.)	Lille	France	Escape Foire	27,122 / 27,122	$851,088
June 19	London	England	Wembley Arena	179,120 / 179,120 (Note: This box office score data is representative of all 16 shows at the Wembley Arena on June 19, 20, 22, 23, 25, 26, 27, July 3, 4, 9, 10, 11 & August 20, 22, 23, 24.)	$4,363,364
June 20	London	England	Wembley Arena	179,120 / 179,120	$4,363,364
June 22	London	England	Wembley Arena	179,120 / 179,120	$4,363,364
June 23	London	England	Wembley Arena	179,120 / 179,120	$4,363,364
June 25	London	England	Wembley Arena	179,120 / 179,120	$4,363,364
June 26	London	England	Wembley Arena	179,120 / 179,120	$4,363,364
June 27	London	England	Wembley Arena	179,120 / 179,120	$4,363,364
June 29	Birmingham	England	National Exhibition Centre	52,000 / 52,000 (Note: This box office score data is representative of all 4 shows at the NEC on June 29, 30, July 1 & 13)	$1,339,000
June 30	Birmingham	England	National Exhibition Centre	52,000 / 52,000	$1,339,000
July 1	Birmingham	England	National Exhibition Centre	52,000 / 52,000	$1,339,000
July 3	London	England	Wembley Arena		
July 4	London	England	Wembley Arena		
July 7 (Note: Originally scheduled for July 6.)	Cork	Ireland	Páirc Uí Chaoimh	56,010 / 56,010	$1,520,111
July 9	London	England	Wembley Arena		
July 10	London	England	Wembley Arena		
July 11	London	England	Wembley Arena		
July 13	Birmingham	England	National Exhibition Centre		
July 15 (Note: Originally scheduled for May 27.)	Basel	Switzerland	St. Jakob-Park	51,015 / 51,015	$2,524,732
July 17 (Note: Originally scheduled for July 19.)	Rome	Italy	Stadio Flaminio	13,000 / 13,000	—
July 18	Cava de' Tirreni	Italy	Stadio Simonetta Lamberti	19,980 / 30,000	—
July 22 (Note: Originally scheduled for July 24.)	Madrid	Spain	Vicente Calderón Stadium	64,912 / 64,912	$1,862,325
July 24	Valencia	Spain	Mestalla Stadium	48,127 / 48,127	$1,036,339
July 25 (Note: Originally scheduled for July 26.)	Barcelona	Spain	Estadi Olímpic de Montjuïc	49,455 / 49,455	$1,410,256
July 27 (Note: Originally scheduled for July 22.)	Marbella	Spain	Estadio Municipal de Marbella	29,765 / 29,765	$640,543
July 29	A Coruña	Spain	Estadio Santa Maria del Mar	25,575 / 25,575	$733,746
August 4 (Note: Originally scheduled for June 12 at Forest National, Brussels.)	Werchter	Belgium	Werchter festival ground	22,980 / 22,980	$679,748
August 5 (Note: Originally scheduled for August 8.)	Heerenveen	Netherlands	Thialf	12,090 / 12,090	$317,640
August 6 (Note: Originally scheduled for June 5, to make way for the Copenhagen concert.)	Dortmund	Germany	Westfalenhallen		
August 8 (Note: Originally scheduled for June 10.)	Mannheim	Germany	Maimarkthalle	75,894 / 79,000	$2,365,616
August 10 (Note: Originally scheduled for May 6, but was postponed due to Prince performing at a benefit concert in Minneapolis, Minnesota.)	Gothenburg	Sweden	Scandinavium	10,550 / 10,550	—
August 11 (Note: Originally scheduled for May 12.)	Stockholm	Sweden	Globe Arena	29,000 / 29,000	$735,700
August 12 (Note: Originally scheduled for May 13.)	Stockholm	Sweden	Globe Arena	29,000 / 29,000	$735,700
August 16 (Note: Originally scheduled for May 30, but was moved to make way for a show in Rotterdam, which was eventually cancelled.)	Lausanne	Switzerland	Stade olympique de la Pontaise	32,080 / 32,080	$1,586,997
August 18 (Note: Originally scheduled for August 19, after it was moved from its original date of July 15.)	Nice	France	Stade Charles-Ehrmann	30,500 / 30,500	$1,292,285
August 20	London	England	Wembley Arena		
August 21 (Note: Originally scheduled for August 2.)	Manchester	England	Maine Road	35,770 / 35,770	$921,077
August 22	London	England	Wembley Arena		
August 23	London	England	Wembley Arena		
August 24	London	England	Wembley Arena		
August 30	Tokyo	Japan	Tokyo Dome	90,550 / 90,550	$7,476,712
August 31	Tokyo	Japan	Tokyo Dome	90,550 / 90,550	$7,476,712
September 2	Nishinomiya	Japan	Hankyu Nishinomiya Stadium	36,605 / 36,605	$2,686,441
September 6	Sapporo	Japan	Makomanai Open Stadium	22,500 / 22,500	$1,652,275
September 10	Yokohama	Japan	Yokohama Stadium	41,110 / 41,110	$3,394,453
Total				1,208,605 / 1,219,351 (99.11%)	$50,247,005

=== Cancelled dates ===
Date	City	Country	Venue
April 27, 1990	Dublin	Ireland	RDS Simmonscourt
April 28, 1990	Dublin	Ireland	RDS Simmonscourt
April 29, 1990	Dublin	Ireland	RDS Simmonscourt
May 8, 1990 (Note: Rescheduled to take place on August 6 & 7, then cancelled.)	Helsinki	Finland	Helsinki Ice Hall
May 9, 1990	Helsinki	Finland	Helsinki Ice Hall
May 15, 1990	Oslo	Norway	Oslo Spektrum
May 22, 1990	Lyon	France	Stade de Gerland
May 23, 1990	Strasbourg	France	Stade de la Meinau
May 25, 1990	Vienna	Austria	Wiener Stadthalle
May 30, 1990	Rotterdam	Netherlands	Ahoy Rotterdam
June 17, 1990	Paris	France	Parc des Princes
July 28, 1990 (Note: Originally scheduled for May 24.)	Würzburg	West Germany	Talavera Wiesen
July 20, 1990 (Note: Originally scheduled for July 17.)	Turin	Italy	Stadio Olimpico Grande Torino
July 30, 1990	Udine	Italy	Stadio Friuli
August 7, 1990 (Note: Originally set to take place at Müngersdorfer Stadion, Cologne, on June 9.)	Dortmund	West Germany	Westfalenhallen
August 14, 1990 (Note: Originally scheduled for May 31.)	Oldenburg	West Germany	Weser-Ems Halle
August 18, 1990	Nimes	France	Arena of Nimes
