= Thieves in the Temple =

- UK 7" single

Single by Prince

from the album Graffiti Bridge
- B-side: "Thieves in the Temple (Part II)"; "Thieves in the House" (12"); "Temple House Dub" (12")
- Released: July 17, 1990
- Recorded: February 11, 1990
- Studio: Paisley Park Studios, Chanhassen, Minnesota
- Genre: Pop; dance
- Length: 3:20 (album/7" version); 8:08 (12" remix); 3:37 (7" short video mix)
- Label: Paisley Park/Warner Bros.
- Songwriter: Prince
- Producer: Prince

Prince singles chronology
"Scandalous!" (1989)	"Thieves in the Temple" (1990)	"New Power Generation" (1990)

Graffiti Bridge singles chronology
"Thieves in the Temple" (1990)	"Round and Round" (1990)

Music video
- "Thieves in the Temple" on YouTube

"Thieves in the Temple" is a song by American musician Prince from the 1990 soundtrack album Graffiti Bridge. Added at the last minute, it was the final song recorded for the album. "Thieves in the Temple" topped the US R&B chart and on the and US Cash Box Top 100 . It also peaked at number six on the Billboard Hot 100 and a number seven hit in the UK, as well as number nine on the Billboard Dance chart.

The track has a unique sound, starting quietly with echoed keyboards and vocals before the main section of the song booms in with a pulsating synth bass, syncopated drum machines, Middle Eastern melodies and opera-like layered vocals. Prince also samples a harmonica solo from a recording by The Chambers Brothers. The vocals are emotional, and accuse the subject of rejecting Prince and lying to him. The "temple" in the title recalls the ever-present spirituality in many of Prince's songs. The maxi single contains extended lyrics that continue the theme before diverging into more dance-oriented material.

The maxi single also contains a Junior Vasquez remix called "Thieves in the House", which is distinctly more dance-oriented. It also contains samples from earlier Prince songs "Eye No" and "Batdance", as well as a dub version of the house track. The accompanying music video for the song was pulled from the film, but an extended video exists which mirrors the extended remix.

== Critical reception ==
Bill Coleman from Billboard magazine wrote, "Latest release finds the elusive Purple One returning to fine form with a catchy, solid rock-n-funk-textured pop number that bodes well for the forthcoming Graffiti Bridge package." Paul Lester from Melody Maker named it Single of the Week, commenting, "'Thieves in the Temple' is a good Prince single. Not as brilliant one (like 'If I Was Your Girlfriend', 'When Doves Cry'), not really a great one ('Pop Life', 'Alphabet Street'), but a good one all the same. Taut, muscular funk with splashes and layers and just enough detail to ensure you'll want to return to it again and again." David Giles from Music Week felt the song "contains few musical surprises, consisting of the usual polite funk motifs and massed harmonies."

== Retrospective response ==
In a 2020 retrospective review, Andy Healy from Albumism stated that the song is arguably one of Prince's "strongest moments on record" and a "haunting dance track", that "hits hard with its inventive drum programming (just pay attention to the hi-hat pattern) and the layered vocals hook you straight away." He added, "Concise and packing a punch, the album version is an absolute masterpiece that is unbelievably improved upon in the extended 12" cut."

Stephen Thomas Erlewine from AllMusic called "Thieves in the Temple" "sinewy", picking it as one of the songs that "make Graffiti Bridge a thoroughly enjoyable listen." In 2019, Alexis Petridis from The Guardian noted that "its sound is slinky and luscious, the chorus is great – but it's no When Doves Cry." In 2020, Rolling Stone described it as a "brooding, spiritual meditation on lies, rejection and soul-searching", stating that "with a Middle Eastern flavor, almost operatic vocals and an agitated feel, it was a decidedly new vibe for Prince." A reviewer from Sunday Tribune stated that "it's a great title, the song is well catchy after a few plays and Prince sings beautifully."

== Track listing ==
- 7", Paisley Park / 7-19751 (US)
1. "Thieves in the Temple" – 3:20
2. "Thieves in the Temple" (Part II) – 1:41
- 12", Paisley Park / 0-21598 (US)
1. "Thieves in the Temple" (Remix) – 8:03
2. "Thieves in the House" – 6:50
3. "Temple House Dub" – 5:06
- also available on UK 12" picture disc (W9751TP)
- also available on CD (9 21598-2)

== Personnel ==
Credits from Benoît Clerc and Guitarcloud

- Prince – lead and backing vocals, Roland D-50, electric guitar, Dynacord ADD-One, LinnDrum
- Lester Chambers – harmonica (sampled from "I Can't Stand It" (1967) by The Chambers Brothers)

== Charts ==
=== Weekly charts ===
Weekly chart performance for "Thieves in the Temple"
Chart (1990–2016)	Peak position
Australia (ARIA)	16
Belgium (Ultratop 50 Flanders)	9
Denmark (IFPI)	3
Europe (Eurochart Hot 100)	16
Germany (GfK)	21
Italy (Musica e Dischi)	11
Luxembourg (Radio Luxembourg)	3
Netherlands (Dutch Top 40)	5
Netherlands (Single Top 100)	8
New Zealand (Recorded Music NZ)	5
Norway (VG-lista)	4
Sweden (Sverigetopplistan)	11
Switzerland (Schweizer Hitparade)	12
UK Singles (Official Charts)	7
US Billboard Hot 100	6
US Hot R&B/Hip-Hop Songs (Billboard)	1
US Cash Box Top 100	1

=== Year-end charts ===
Year-end chart performance for "Thieves in the Temple"
Chart (1990)	Position
Australia (ARIA)	98
Netherlands (Dutch Top 40)	93
Netherlands (Single Top 100)	76
New Zealand (RIANZ)	47
Sweden (Topplistan)	56
US Billboard Hot 100	98
US 12-inch Singles Sales (Billboard)	29
US Hot R&B Singles (Billboard)	42
US Cash Box Top 100	11

== See also ==
- List of number-one R&B singles of 1990 (U.S.)

== Cover versions ==
- Herbie Hancock recorded an instrumental version of "Thieves in the Temple" on his 1996 album The New Standard, implicitly nominating the song as a contemporary jazz standard.
- Renée Geyer covered the song on her album, Tenderland (2003).
- A version was also recorded by experimental band Ulver, in the style of their album Shadows of the Sun with guest vocals by Siri Stranger.
- Prince's scream at the end of the song was sampled for the 1993 Eddie Murphy and Michael Jackson duet, "Whatzupwitu".
