= New Power Generation (song) =

- UK 7" single

Single by Prince

from the album Graffiti Bridge
- B-side: "New Power Generation (Part II)"; "Brother with a Purpose" (12"); "Get Off" (12"); "The Lubricated Lady" (12"); "Loveleft, Loveright" (12"); "Melody Cool" (Extended Remix; UK 12"); Funky Weapon Remix, T.C.'s Rap
- Released: October 23, 1990
- Recorded: January 1982–December 1989
- Studio: Paisley Park, Chanhassen
- Genre: New jack swing
- Length: 3:39 (Album/7" Pt 1); 5:01 (Funky Weapon Remix)
- Label: Paisley Park; Warner Bros.
- Songwriter: Prince
- Producer: Prince

Prince singles chronology
"Thieves in the Temple" (1990)	"New Power Generation" (1990)	"Gett Off" (1991)

Graffiti Bridge singles chronology
Round and Round (1990)	New Power Generation (1990)	Melody Cool (1990)

Music video
- "New Power Generation" on YouTube

"New Power Generation", or "N.P.G.", is a song by American musician Prince from the 1990 album and film Graffiti Bridge. It is an anthem for his backing band, The New Power Generation, who were officially co-credited on his album covers for a time, and continued to back him up until 2013, albeit with a changing lineup. The song saw minimal chart attention, and was not as successful as its predecessor, "Thieves in the Temple".

"N.P.G." is a funk number featuring drumming by Morris Day, and vocal help by Rosie Gaines. The track had originally been cut in January of 1982 during the sessions for The Time's What Time Is It? under the name of "Bold Generation". The track was revisited in 1989, albeit heavily redone with Day's drum track buried in the mix.

The funk on the track is cut by some carnival-like organ playing and distorted guitar. The song is generally a positive message of overcoming odds. The part two continuation of the song features contributions from a number of artists, as well as samples of several unreleased songs. Tevin Campbell and Mavis Staples sing in part two, and a rap is delivered by T.C. Ellis. Unreleased songs sampled include "My Tree", "Oobey Doop", and "Positive Place".

The B-side for the single was "New Power Generation, pt. 2", also from Graffiti Bridge.

== Releases ==
The 12" and CD maxi release contained numerous previously unheard remixes and bonus material. It began with a "Funky Weapon Remix" of "N.P.G.", which combined parts one and two of the song, but removed all other vocals other than Prince and Rosie Gaines. Next was "T.C.'s Rap". This mix was the "True Confessions" rap by rapper T.C. Ellis, whom Prince would later assist on a 1991 album. Another rap follows called "Brother with a Purpose". The main song was slowed down, and Tony M. delivers an original rap atop the tune.

"Get Off" is next, which is a new song over the beat of "N.P.G." Some ideas from this track would later be incorporated in the similarly titled "Gett Off" from Diamonds and Pearls. "Get Off" is then incorporated into "The Lubricated Lady". The final track is a song about a threesome called "Loveleft, Loveright", which itself was sampled in "New Power Generation, pt. 2". The song ends with the same spoken segment from Prince that begins the EP.

The 12" single released in the UK included "Melody Cool" (Extended Remix), sung by Mavis Staples. In Japan, the CD maxi single included all the tracks from the US maxi single, plus those from "Thieves in the Temple".

== Critical reception ==
Andy Healy from Albumism stated that Prince "delivered" on the "funk heavy" song, "with its mix of social consciousness and dance grooves". Larry Flick from Billboard magazine wrote, "The master of funk/rock dips into his Graffiti Bridge disc and pulls out another multiformat gem. Imaginative and ethereal track emphasizes his unique vocal stamp, and features guest appearances by Mavis Staples and Tevin Campbell." Greg Kot from Chicago Tribune described it as "the record's manifesto-like lead track". Duncan Holland from Music Week commented, "Take all above styles, mix them all together, and you get Prince. Although a fairly routine track, this is the one that could give him his tenth Top 10. Is there anything this man cannot do?" A reviewer from People Magazine noted "the up-side-your-head funk" of the song.

== Chart performance ==
"New Power Generation" failed to make the Top 40 of the US Billboard Hot 100; however, on the Billboard R&B/Hip-Hop singles chart, the song reached number 27, and it peaked one spot higher in the UK, but the track was still considered a commercial disappointment.

== Track listing ==
- 7"
1. "New Power Generation" – 3:39
2. "New Power Generation" (Part II) – 2:57
- UK 12"
1. "New Power Generation" – 3:39
2. "New Power Generation" (Part II) – 2:57
3. "Melody Cool" (Extended Remix) featuring Mavis Staples – 6:04
- Maxi single
1. "N.P.G." (Funky Weapon Remix) – 5:01
2. "T.C.'s Rap" (featuring T.C. Ellis) – 3:11
3. "Brother with a Purpose" (featuring Tony Mosley) – 4:18
4. "Get Off" – 4:41
5. "The Lubricated Lady" – 2:39
6. "Loveleft, Loveright" – 5:00

== Personnel ==
Credits from Benoît Clerc and Guitarcloud

Part 1

- Prince – lead and backing vocals, synthesizers, electric guitar, bass guitar, Dynacord ADD-One, handclaps
- Rosie Gaines – co-lead vocals
- New Power Generation – co-lead vocals, spoken word
- Morris Day – drums

Part 2

- Prince – lead and backing vocals, synthesizers, electric guitar, bass guitar, Dynacord ADD-One, tambourine, handclaps
- T.C. Ellis – rap
- Morris Day – drums
- Tevin Campbell – backing vocals
- Mavis Staples – backing vocals
- Robin Power – backing vocals
- New Power Generation – backing vocals, spoken word

Bold Generation

- Prince – lead and backing vocals, piano, synthesizers, electric guitars, bass guitar, handclaps
- Morris Day – drums

== Charts ==
Chart performance for "New Power Generation"
Chart (1990)	Peak position
Australia (ARIA)	91
Belgium (Ultratop 50 Flanders)	42
Europe (Eurochart Hot 100)	53
Luxembourg (Radio Luxembourg)	19
Netherlands (Dutch Top 40)	21
Netherlands (Single Top 100)	18
UK Singles (Official Charts)	26
UK Airplay (Music Week)	12
US Billboard Hot 100	64
US Hot 100 Airplay (Billboard)	70
US Hot R&B Songs (Billboard)	27
