= Graffiti Bridge (album) =

1990 studio album by Prince

Studio album / soundtrack album by Prince and other artists
- Released: August 20, 1990
- Recorded: 1981–1990
- Studios: Paisley Park, Chanhassen; Sunset Sound, Hollywood; Mad Hatter, Los Angeles; Electric Lady, New York City; United Sound, Detroit; Washington Avenue Warehouse, Edina
- Genres: Rock; funk; R&B; hip hop
- Length: 68:32
- Labels: Paisley Park; Warner Bros.
- Producer: Prince

Prince chronology
Batman (1989)	Graffiti Bridge (1990)	Diamonds and Pearls (1991)

Singles from Graffiti Bridge
- 1. "Thieves in the Temple" Released: July 17, 1990; 2. "Melody Cool" Released: August 10, 1990; 3. "Round and Round" Released: September 24, 1990; 4. "New Power Generation" Released: October 23, 1990; 5. "Shake!" Released: January 8, 1991

Graffiti Bridge is the twelfth studio album by American recording artist Prince and is the soundtrack album to the 1990 film of the same name. It was released on August 20, 1990, by Paisley Park Records and Warner Bros. Records.

The album was much better received in sales than the film. It reached number 6 in the United States and was his third consecutive chart-topper (following Lovesexy and Batman) on the UK Albums Chart. Nearly every song on the record was written by Prince including those performed by the handful of other performing artists, including Tevin Campbell, Mavis Staples, and the Time. The album produced the hit singles "Thieves in the Temple" and "New Power Generation", an anthem in two parts celebrating Prince's newly created backing band, the New Power Generation. The band would get its first official outing on Prince's next album, Diamonds and Pearls.

== Background ==
The concept for the album and film began as early as mid-1987, but experienced delays for various reasons. The title track was originally recorded during this period, hence the liner notes listing Sheila E. and Boni Boyer as performers on the track. In fact, nearly the entire album is composed of previously recorded sessions that were updated for this release.

"Tick, Tick, Bang" was originally from 1981 during the sessions for the Controversy album. Written by Prince, it was originally a more punk rock song with a bass synthesizer; the update of the song includes an uncredited drum sample from Jimi Hendrix's "Little Miss Lover". "Can't Stop This Feeling I Got" was from 1982, but later updated in mid-1986 during sessions for aborted album Dream Factory, before further updating. "We Can Funk" was first recorded in 1983, originally titled "We Can Fuck", before Prince re-recorded the song in 1986 with the Revolution (under the title "We Can Funk"), before further updating to the 1983 version took place. A melody similar to that of "Purple Rain" can be heard during the bridge of "Can't Stop This Feeling I Got". The three tracks were drastically updated in 1989 for release on Graffiti Bridge.

"The Question of U" was recorded in 1985 during sessions for Parade with little updating added to the original version. "Joy in Repetition" was first included on the unreleased Crystal Ball album in late 1986, and the same recording was used for this album (the track was not updated further for release, unlike the other "old" songs). Prince also kept the original segue of party noise at the start of the song (this time segueing from "We Can Funk" on this album instead of "The Ball" when "Joy in Repetition" was placed on Crystal Ball in 1986) which is also heard at the end of "Eye No", leading into "Alphabet St." on Lovesexy. The title track (from 1987) was updated for the album as well as "Elephants & Flowers" (from the 1988 unreleased Rave Unto the Joy Fantastic album) and "The Latest Fashion" (later given to the Time for their unreleased Corporate World album). "Melody Cool" and "Still Would Stand All Time" were intended for Rave Unto the Joy Fantastic and were later performed in some Lovesexy aftershows. "Still Would Stand All Time" was later considered for Batman, but was replaced by "Scandalous". The four tracks featuring the Time were originally going to be on Corporate World, recorded in 1989, though "The Latest Fashion" reuses music from "My Summertime Thang" from their album Pandemonium. "New Power Generation" was originally recorded in 1982 as "Bold Generation".

The only truly "new" compositions recorded for the album were "Round and Round", performed by Tevin Campbell, and "Thieves in the Temple". The latter song was the final track recorded for the album, recorded in early 1990. The B-side "Get Off" would soon be incorporated into "Gett Off" the following year.

== Critical reception ==
Professional ratings
Review scores
Source	Rating
AllMusic	3.5/5 stars
Blender	2/5 stars
Chicago Tribune	3.5/4 stars
Entertainment Weekly	A+
The Guardian	3/5 stars
Los Angeles Times	3.5/5 stars
NME	9/10
Q	4/5 stars
Rolling Stone	4/5 stars
The Village Voice	B+

Graffiti Bridge received positive reviews from contemporary critics, who praised Prince's songwriting and the variety of the music while deeming it an improvement over 1988's Lovesexy. Time magazine hailed the record as a "groovable feast", while Q's Lloyd Bradley claimed it was "practically impossible to choose anything that doesn't deserve to be there. How long is it since that can honestly be said about a Prince album?" In Entertainment Weekly, Greg Sandow said the album was likely a "masterpiece" that found Prince rediscovering his ability to cover different styles effortlessly. David Quantick of NME felt that it was the first Prince album to consolidate his various influences into a unified sound, instead of "separating them out so we can see how good he is at displaying his references". Rolling Stone reviewer Paul Evans credited him for lending a "sharper focus", "harder groove", and emphasis on funk and rock rather than "the feckless genre dabbling" of albums such as Lovesexy and Around the World in a Day (1985). Evans also believed Prince's catchy compositions helped make the "omnivorous mysticism" of his lyrics "newly convincing — convincing, but still startling, sensual and freeing". Greg Kot, the Chicago Tribune's chief music critic, called the album "a sprawling, wildly diffuse statement on love, sin, sex and salvation that ranks with his best work", as well as "perhaps his most complex and, dare we say, mature exploration" of those themes.

In The New York Times, Jon Pareles believed Graffiti Bridge would perhaps give Prince a success on both commercial and artistic terms, although he lamented some of the lyrics: "Verbally, he's no deep thinker; when he's not singing about sex, his messages tend to be benevolent and banal." Robert Christgau was less impressed in his consumer guide for The Village Voice. He applauded the guest artists, particularly the Time, and some of Prince's own half of songs, but said most of them were "overly subtle if not rehashed or just weak: title track, generational anthem, and lead single all reprise familiar themes, and the ballads fall short of the exquisite vocalese that can make his slow ones sing." At the end of 1990, Graffiti Bridge was voted the tenth best album of the year in the Pazz & Jop, a nationwide poll of American critics, published by The Village Voice.

In a retrospective review for AllMusic, Stephen Thomas Erlewine called Graffiti Bridge an "often very good" album whose best songs were those performed by Prince, with the exception of the Time's "Release It" and Tevin Campbell's "Round and Round". Michaelangelo Matos was more critical in The Rolling Stone Album Guide (2004), finding the record "interesting primarily for its guest stars" and "for the fact that it now sounds as dated as the new jack swing it apes".

== Track listing ==
All tracks are written by and performed by Prince, except where noted.

Graffiti Bridge track listing
No.	Title	Writer(s)	Artist	Length
1.	"Can't Stop This Feeling I Got"			4:24
2.	"New Power Generation, Part 1"			3:39
3.	"Release It"	Prince; Levi Seacer Jr.	The Time	3:54
4.	"The Question of U"			3:59
5.	"Elephants & Flowers"			3:54
6.	"Round and Round"		Tevin Campbell	3:55
7.	"We Can Funk" (featuring George Clinton)	Prince; George Clinton		5:28
8.	"Joy in Repetition"			4:53
9.	"Love Machine" (featuring Elisa Fiorillo)	Prince; Seacer; Morris Day	The Time	3:34
10.	"Tick, Tick, Bang"			3:31
11.	"Shake!"		The Time	4:01
12.	"Thieves in the Temple"			3:19
13.	"The Latest Fashion" (featuring Prince)		The Time	4:02
14.	"Melody Cool"		Mavis Staples	3:39
15.	"Still Would Stand All Time"			5:23
16.	"Graffiti Bridge" (featuring Mavis Staples and Tevin Campbell)			3:51
17.	"New Power Generation, Part 2" (featuring Mavis Staples, Tevin Campbell, T.C. Ellis and Robin Power)			2:57
Total length:				68:32

== Personnel ==
- Prince – lead and backing vocals, electric and acoustic guitars, Roland D-50, E-mu Emax, Fairlight CMI, Oberheim OB-8, synthesizers, bass guitar, drums, LinnDrum, Linn LM-1, Dynacord ADD-One, Publison IM90 Infernal Machine
- Morris Day – drums (2, 17), lead vocals (3, 11), co-lead vocals (9, 13)
- Joseph "Amp" Fiddler – additional synthesizers and backing vocals (7)
- Boni Boyer – Hammond organ (16), backing vocals (16)
- Levi Seacer, Jr. – bass guitar (16), backing vocals (16)
- Sheila E. – drums (16), backing vocals (16)
- Candy Dulfer – saxophone (3, 9, 13)
- Eric Leeds – saxophone (7)
- Atlanta Bliss – trumpet (7)
- Wendy Melvoin – electric guitar (7), backing vocals (7)
- Lisa Coleman – synthesizers (7), backing vocals (7)
- Tevin Campbell – lead vocals (6), backing vocals (16, 17)
- George Clinton – co-lead vocals (7)
- Elisa Fiorillo – co-lead vocals (9) (credited as Elisa)
- Susannah Melvoin – backing vocals (8)
- Mavis Staples – lead vocals (14), backing vocals (16, 17)
- Rosie Gaines – backing vocals (2)
- Robin Power – backing vocals (17)
- New Power Generation – co-lead vocals (2), spoken word (2, 17), backing vocals (17)
- Michael "Clip" Payne – additional drums and backing vocals (7)
- David Coleman – oud (7), finger cymbals (7)
- Jerome Benton – spoken word and crowd chatter (13), backing vocals (3, 9, 15)
- Tom Garneau, Michael Koppelman – crowd chatter (13)
- Jana Anderson – backing vocals (11)
- T.C. Ellis – rap (17)
- Gary Shider, Steve Boyd, William Payne, Belita Woods, Paul Hill, Tracey Lewis, Mike Harris, Pat Lewis, Sandra Dance – backing vocals (7)
- Jevetta Steele, J.D. Steele, Fred Steele, Jearlyn Steele – backing vocals (14, 15)
- Jill Jones, Jellybean Johnson, Jesse Johnson, Jimmy Jam and Terry Lewis, Monte Moir – backing vocals (15)
- Clare Fischer – orchestral arrangement (16)
- Steven Parke – album artwork design
- Harmonica on 12 played by Lester Chambers, sampled from "I Can't Stand It" (1967) by The Chambers Brothers.
- Drums on 3 played by David Garibaldi, sampled from "Squib Cakes" (1974) by Tower of Power.
- Michael Koppelman – engineer

== Singles and Hot 100 chart placings ==
- "Thieves in the Temple" maxi-single (#6 US, #1 US R&B, #7 UK)
1. "Thieves in the Temple" (extended)
2. "Thieves in the House"
3. "Temple House dub"
- "New Power Generation" maxi-single (#64 US, #27 US R&B, #26 UK)
1. "New Power Generation" (funky weapon remix)
2. "T.C.'s Rap"
3. "Brother with a Purpose"
4. "Get Off"
5. "The Lubricated Lady"
6. "Loveleft/Loveright"
- "Round and Round" maxi-single (#12 US, #3 US R&B)
1. "Round and Round" (Solu Mix Edit)
2. "Round and Round" (The House Mix)
3. "Goodbye" (Tevin's Dub – Part 1 & 2)
4. "Goodbye" (Soiddub & Listen)
- "Melody Cool" maxi-single (#36 US R&B)
1. "Melody Cool" (Extended LP Mix)
2. "Melody Cool" (Extended Remix)
3. "Melody Cool" (Deep House Vocal)
4. "Melody Cool" (Mellow Dub Mix)
5. "Time Waits for No-one" (Edit)
- "Shake!" maxi-single
1. "Shake!" (Extended Mix) – 5:03
2. "Shake!" (Battle Mix) – 4:06
3. "Shake!" (Funky House Mix) – 8:20
4. "The Latest Fashion" (Remix) – 6:20
5. "Shake!" (Boom Mix) – 5:01
6. "Shake!" – 4:00

== Charts ==
=== Weekly charts ===
Weekly chart performance for Graffiti Bridge
Chart (1990)	Peak position
Australian Albums (ARIA)	10
Austrian Albums (Ö3 Austria)	8
Canadian Albums (RPM)	22
Dutch Albums (Album Top 100)	4
Finnish Albums (Suomen virallinen lista)	7
German Albums (Offizielle Top 100)	4
New Zealand Albums (RMNZ)	3
Norwegian Albums (VG-lista)	2
Spanish Albums (Promusicae)	8
Swedish Albums (Sverigetopplistan)	7
Swiss Albums (Schweizer Hitparade)	2
UK Albums (Official Charts)	1
US Billboard 200	6
US Top R&B/Hip-Hop Albums (Billboard)	6

2016 weekly chart performance for Graffiti Bridge
Chart (2016)	Peak position
US Soundtrack Albums (Billboard)	9

=== Year-end charts ===
Year-end chart performance for Graffiti Bridge
Chart (1990)	Position
Dutch Albums (Album Top 100)	44
German Albums (Offizielle Top 100)	94

== Certifications ==
Certifications for Graffiti Bridge
Region	Certification	Certified units/sales
Canada (Music Canada)	Gold	50,000^{^}
Spain (Promusicae)	Gold	50,000^{^}
Switzerland (IFPI Switzerland)	Gold	25,000^{^}
United Kingdom (BPI)	Gold	100,000^{^}
United States (RIAA)	Gold	500,000^{^}
^{^} Shipments figures based on certification alone.
