= Batman (album) =

1989 studio/soundtrack album by Prince

Studio album / soundtrack album by Prince
- Released: June 20, 1989
- Recorded: June 1988 – March 1989
- Studios: Paisley Park, Chanhassen
- Genres: Rock; pop; funk; soul; synth-pop; dance
- Length: 42:52
- Label: Warner Bros.
- Producer: Prince

Prince chronology
| Lovesexy (1988) | Batman (1989) | Graffiti Bridge (1990) |

Singles from Batman
- 1. "Batdance" Released: June 8, 1989; 2. "Partyman" Released: August 18, 1989; 3. "The Arms of Orion" Released: October 16, 1989; 4. "Scandalous!" Released: November 28, 1989; 5. "The Future" Released: May 18, 1990 (EU)

Batman is the eleventh studio album by American recording artist Prince and the soundtrack album to the 1989 film Batman. It was released on June 20, 1989, by Warner Bros. Records. As a Warner Bros. stablemate, Prince's involvement in the soundtrack was designed to leverage the media company's contract-bound talent as well as fulfill the artist's need for a commercial revival. The result was yet another multi-platinum successful cross media enterprise by Warner Bros., in the vein of Purple Rain.

The album stayed at number one on the Billboard 200 for six consecutive weeks, being his first number one album since Around the World in a Day, while its lead single, "Batdance", became his first number-one song since "Kiss". It is certified double platinum by the Recording Industry Association of America (RIAA).

== Production ==
The album was recorded in six weeks, from mid-February to late March 1989. Prince used three tracks recorded earlier: "Electric Chair", "Scandalous!", and "Vicki Waiting". Originally, the songs "1999" and "Baby I'm a Star" from earlier albums were slated to be used in the film, but Prince instead recorded an entire album's worth of material with Batman samples and lyrics.

In a 2010 Rolling Stone interview, Prince revealed that the project was initially supposed to be a collaboration between himself and Michael Jackson: "Did you know that the album was supposed to be a duet between Michael Jackson and me? He as Batman, me as the Joker?" Prince would have sung funk songs for the villains, while Jackson would have sung ballads for the heroes. This never came to fruition, as Jackson was busy with his Bad World Tour and already signed with Epic Records (the label he had been with since 1975), while the film was a Warner Bros. production.

The album was performed entirely by Prince, with a few exceptions: Sheena Easton duets with Prince on "The Arms of Orion", "Trust" features a sampled horn part by Eric Leeds and Atlanta Bliss, and "The Future" features strings by Clare Fischer sampled from the then-unreleased 1986 track "Crystal Ball" and samples of the Sounds of Blackness choir. "Batdance" includes a sample of Prince's technician Matthew Larson, and "Partyman" features a sample of spoken word from Anna Fantastic. All dialogue sampled on Prince's Batman album is taken directly from a workprint of Batman and therefore lacks ADR and foley. This is especially noticeable in the beginning of the first track, "The Future", with dialogue of Michael Keaton speaking as Batman.

The producers originally wanted composer Danny Elfman, who was responsible for the film's score, to collaborate with Prince. However, Elfman declined as he already had the score's vision and did not want to be a music arranger.

In the album's liner notes, the lyrics of each song are associated with one of the characters in the film: "The Future" and "Scandalous" are credited to Batman; while "Electric Chair" and "Trust" are credited to the Joker. "Vicki Waiting" is sung from the perspective of Bruce Wayne, while "Lemon Crush" comes from Vicki Vale; the two characters share the duet, "The Arms of Orion". "Partyman" was inspired by Prince's first meeting with Jack Nicholson (out-of-character) on-set.

"Batdance", whose lyrics consist mostly of samples from the film, is credited to all aforementioned parties, as well as Gemini, Prince's Batman-centric alter ego that resembles Batman villain Two-Face—Prince on the right half of the body and the Joker on the left. Prince himself is credited with singing two lines of the album as himself: "Who do you trust if you can't trust God? Who can you trust—who can ya? Nobody." in "Trust"; and the word "Stop!" that ends "Batdance" and the album proper (though the "Stop!" is actually a sound bite of Michael Keaton, directly from the film where he tells the Batmobile to stop).

The Batman era also marked a change in Prince's appearance; he switched out the elaborate costumes, polka dots and lace from Lovesexy for much simpler attire, usually donning dark blue/black clothing and "Batman" boots. The artist's hair was fully straightened from his signature wavy curls, as shown in the "Batdance" video.

== Reception ==
Professional ratings
Review scores
| Source | Rating |
|---|---|
| AllMusic | 2.5/5 stars |
| Blender | 3/5 stars |
| Chicago Sun-Times | 3.5/4 stars |
| Entertainment Weekly | B− |
| The Guardian | 3/5 stars |
| Los Angeles Times | 3/5 stars |
| NME | 9/10 |
| Q | 4/5 stars |
| Rolling Stone | 4/5 stars |
| The Village Voice | B+ |

In 2016, film critic Matt Zoller Seitz praised Prince's songs and music videos for Batman, more so than the film itself, stating that his songs "suggest a goofy, perverse, sensuous, somewhat introverted Batman film that so far we've never gotten from anyone", and arguing that Prince's music videos "are more psychologically perceptive than any of the Batman films".

In 2019, a Symposium took place to discuss the album.

== Ownership complexities ==
Prince had to agree to sign the publishing rights to the songs used in the film over to Warner Bros.; Prince's hit singles from this album were not permitted to appear on any of his hits compilations until the 2016 release of 4Ever, which included "Batdance". Only the B-sides "200 Balloons", "Feel U Up", and "I Love U in Me" appeared on his 1993 The Hits/The B-Sides collection. On concert T-shirts which listed all of Prince's album titles to date, the song "Scandalous!" appeared in place of the album Batman. Despite this, Prince performed a number of the album's tracks in concert over the years. A 2005 special edition DVD of the Batman film contains Prince's related videos as a bonus feature (although the video for "Partyman" is an edited down version of the original seven-minute long video).

== Track listing ==
All tracks are written by Prince, except where noted.

Side one
| No. | Title | Writer(s) | Length |
|---|---|---|---|
| 1. | "The Future" | | 4:07 |
| 2. | "Electric Chair" | | 4:07 |
| 3. | "The Arms of Orion" (with Sheena Easton) | Sheena Easton; Prince | 5:02 |
| 4. | "Partyman" | | 3:11 |
| 5. | "Vicki Waiting" | | 4:51 |

Side two
| No. | Title | Writer(s) | Length |
|---|---|---|---|
| 6. | "Trust" | | 4:23 |
| 7. | "Lemon Crush" | | 4:15 |
| 8. | "Scandalous" | John L. Nelson; Prince | 6:14 |
| 9. | "Batdance" | | 6:13 |
| Total length: | | | 42:52 |

== Personnel ==
Adapted from Jake Brown and Benoît Clerc

=== Musicians ===
- Prince – lead vocals (all tracks), backing vocals (tracks 2–8), electric guitar (tracks 1–2, 4–7, 9), bass guitar (tracks 1–6, 9), synthesizers (all tracks), Fairlight CMI (tracks 1, 4–6), Roland D-50 (tracks 1, 3, 5, 7–8), Wurlitzer 200 (track 3), piano (track 4), programming (all tracks), Dynacord ADD-One (tracks 2, 5), LinnDrum (tracks 1, 3, 5, 8–9), finger snapping (track 1), zills (track 3), triangle (track 3), percussion (track 6), tambourine (track 6), claps (track 6), Publison IM90 Infernal Machine (track 1), E-mu Emax, E-mu Emulator II, Ensoniq EPS, Linn LM-1, Simmons SDSV
- Christopher Fairbank (as "Nick") – sampled vocals (track 1)
- Michael Keaton (as "Batman") – sampled vocals (tracks 1, 9)
- Jack Nicholson (as "The Joker") – sampled vocals (tracks 1, 4–5, 9)
- Sounds of Blackness – choir (track 1)
- Sheena Easton – lead vocals (track 3)
- Kim Basinger (as "Vicki Vale") – sampled vocals (tracks 4–5, 9)
- Anna Fantastic – spoken vocals (track 4)
- Femi Jiya – spoken vocals (track 4)
- Atlanta Bliss – trumpet (track 6)
- Eric Leeds – saxophone (track 6)
- Robert Wuhl (as "Alexander Knox") – sampled vocals (track 6)
- Matthew Larson – vocals (track 9)
- Mavis Staples – sampled vocals (track 9)

=== Technical ===
- Peter Guber, Gary LeMel, Jon Peters – executive producer
- Prince – producer (all tracks)
- Femi Jiya – recording engineer (all tracks)
- David Friedlander, Heidi Hanschu, Eddie Miller, Chuck Zwicky – assistant recording engineers (all tracks)
- Clare Fischer – orchestration sample (track 1)

== Singles and Hot 100 chart placings ==
- "Batdance" (#1 US, #1 US R&B, #2 UK)
1. "Batdance" (edit)
2. "200 Balloons"
3. "Batdance" (The Batmix) (maxi single)
4. "Batdance" (Vicki Vale Mix) (maxi single)
- "Partyman" (#18 US, #5 US R&B, #14 UK)
1. "Partyman"
2. "Feel U Up"
3. "The Purple Party Mix" (maxi single)
4. "Partyman" (music mix) (maxi single)
5. "Partyman" (video mix) (maxi single)
- "The Arms of Orion" (#36 US, #27 UK)
1. "The Arms of Orion" with Sheena Easton
2. "I Love U in Me"
- "Scandalous!" (US) (#5 US R&B)
1. "Scandalous!"
2. "When 2 R in Love"
3. "The Crime" ("The Scandalous Sex Suite" maxi single)
4. "The Passion" ("The Scandalous Sex Suite" maxi single)
5. "The Rapture" ("The Scandalous Sex Suite" maxi single)
6. "Sex" ("The Scandalous Sex Suite" maxi single)
- "The Future" (UK/Germany)
1. "The Future" (Remix)
2. "Electric Chair" (Remix)

== Charts ==
=== Weekly charts ===
Weekly chart performance for Batman
| Chart (1989) | Peak position |
|---|---|
| Australian Albums (ARIA) | 4 |
| Austrian Albums (Ö3 Austria) | 3 |
| Belgian Albums (BEA) | 1 |
| Canada Top Albums/CDs (RPM) | 1 |
| Danish Albums (IFPI) | 2 |
| Dutch Albums (Album Top 100) | 1 |
| European Albums (European Top 100 Albums) | 1 |
| Finnish Albums (Suomen virallinen lista) | 2 |
| French Albums (IFOP) | 1 |
| German Albums (Offizielle Top 100) | 3 |
| Irish Albums (IRMA) | 1 |
| New Zealand Albums (RMNZ) | 4 |
| Norwegian Albums (VG-lista) | 2 |
| Portuguese Albums (AFP) | 3 |
| Spanish Albums (AFYVE) | 5 |
| Swedish Albums (Sverigetopplistan) | 2 |
| Swiss Albums (Schweizer Hitparade) | 1 |
| UK Albums (Official Charts) | 1 |
| US Billboard 200 | 1 |
| US Top R&B/Hip-Hop Albums (Billboard) | 5 |
| Chart (2016) | Peak position |
| US Soundtrack Albums (Billboard) | 4 |
| Chart (2023) | Peak position |
| Belgian Albums (Ultratop Flanders) | 136 |
| Hungarian Physical Albums (MAHASZ) | 39 |

=== Year-end charts ===
1989 year-end chart performance for Batman
| Chart (1989) | Peak position |
|---|---|
| Australian Albums (ARIA) | 49 |
| Austrian Albums (Ö3 Austria) | 19 |
| Canada Top Albums/CDs (RPM) | 17 |
| Dutch Albums (Album Top 100) | 26 |
| European Albums (Music & Media) | 9 |
| German Albums (Offizielle Top 100) | 26 |
| New Zealand Albums (RMNZ) | 32 |
| Swiss Albums (Schweizer Hitparade) | 16 |
| UK Albums (OCC) | 36 |
| US Billboard 200 | 40 |

== Certifications ==
Certifications and sales for Batman
| Region | Certification | Certified units/sales |
|---|---|---|
| Australia (ARIA) | Gold | 35,000^{^} |
| France (SNEP) | Platinum | 300,000^{*} |
| Germany (BVMI) | Gold | 250,000^{^} |
| Hong Kong (IFPI Hong Kong) | Gold | 10,000^{*} |
| Japan (RIAJ) | Gold | 100,000^{^} |
| Netherlands (NVPI) | Gold | 50,000^{^} |
| New Zealand (RMNZ) | Gold | 7,500^{^} |
| Spain (Promusicae) | Platinum | 100,000^{^} |
| Switzerland (IFPI Switzerland) | Gold | 25,000^{^} |
| United Kingdom (BPI) | Platinum | 300,000^{^} |
| United States (RIAA) | 2× Platinum | 2,000,000^{^} |
Summaries
| Worldwide | — | 4,400,000 |
^{*} Sales figures based on certification alone.^{^} Shipments figures based on certification alone.
