= Rosie Gaines =

- Born: Rosemary Gaines; June 26, 1960 (age 66)
- Origin: Oakland, California, U.S.
- Genres: Pop; funk; soul; R&B; dance; house; hip hop
- Years active: 1985–present
- Labels: Dredlix; Motown; NPG; Epic; Dome; SUsu

Rosie Gaines (born Rosemary Gaines; June 26, 1960) is an American singer, songwriter and record producer from Pittsburg, California. Gaines is a former band member of Prince's group the New Power Generation. She duetted with singer Prince on the hit song "Diamonds and Pearls". She released a number of dance hits, the most notable being "Closer than Close", which made the top 10 on the UK Singles Chart in 1997.

== Career ==
=== Ensemble ===
Gaines' first band was a family funk/soul group called Unity, with Gaines on organ, her brother Carl on bass guitar, her cousin Lacy on guitar, sister-in-law Dianne on background vocals and her sister Mal on drums.

Gaines also played in a band called The Oasis and A Touch of Class before joining The Curtis Ohlson Band (with Levi Seacer, Jr. on guitar). Seacer called Gaines one day and asked her to come to Minneapolis, Minnesota to sing a demo of a song for The Pointer Sisters.

=== Prince ===
While she was doing the demo, Prince came in the recording studio, was impressed by her abilities and asked her to join his band The New Power Generation. Gaines was introduced in 1990 as the new vocalist and keyboard player on Prince's Nude Tour. Her first appearance on a Prince album was on Graffiti Bridge, her vocals prominent on the second single, "New Power Generation". She was also a member of the NPG in the film Graffiti Bridge. She wrote and performed on the Diamonds and Pearls album, her lead and background vocals prominently featured on most of the album's tracks, including the hit singles "Gett Off", "Cream" and "Diamonds and Pearls". In 1992, after the Diamonds and Pearls tour concluded, Gaines returned to her solo career, although she continued to work with Prince from time to time. Prince produced the official remix to Gaines's 1995 solo single "I Want U", titled "I Want U (Purple Version)". She duetted with Prince on the live version of "Nothing Compares 2 U", which is available on his 1993 compilation album, The Hits/The B-Sides and also contributed vocals to the tracks "I Rock Therefore I Am" (from Prince's 1996 Chaos and Disorder album), "Jam of the Year" (from Prince's 1996 Emancipation album) and a re-recorded version of "1999" (titled "1999: The New Master"), which was released by Prince & the NPG in 1999. For Prince's Rave Un2 the Year 2000, Gaines was one of many guest appearance, providing vocals for the medley and "Nothing Compares 2 U". Other guests included Larry Graham, Morris Day and The Time, and Lenny Kravitz.

=== Solo ===
Gaines recorded her first solo album, titled Caring, in 1985, followed by the 1987 album No Sweeter Love. Although neither album received much commercial interest at the time, both albums have subsequently been released in a digital format on iTunes.

Following her 3-year tenure with Prince & the NPG, between 1990 and 1992, Gaines started recording her next solo album. Several albums worth of material were recorded, and an album was set for release on Paisley Park Records under the title Concrete Jungle. However it was not released because of a legal battle between Prince and Warner Bros. Records, and remained unreleased until 2010.

Starting over, Gaines eventually released her third solo album (her first post-NPG album) on Motown Records in 1995. The album, titled Closer than Close, spawned the singles "I Want U" and "Are You Ready?", and included the song "My Tender Heart", a song composed by Gaines and Prince and featuring background vocals by Prince and long-time NPG collaborators The Steeles, which Gaines had earlier performed on The Ryde Dyvine TV special in late 1992. In 1995 Gaines also collaborated with Tevin Campbell on the song "I2I", which was featured in the Disney movie A Goofy Movie.

In 1997, a club remix of "Closer than Close" was released as a single. The remix was commercially very successful in the United Kingdom, where it peaked at number four on the UK Singles Chart. It also charted on the Australian club charts and has appeared on numerous club compilation albums. The track earned Gaines a MOBO Award for Best International Single at the ’97 Awards show (beating the likes of P Diddy, previously known as Puff Daddy, R Kelly and Tina Moore), and inspired Gaines to record a follow-up club track, "I Surrender", which was released later that year. The remix is now considered a club classic, and has been re-remixed a number times since its initial release.

With her own record label Dredlix Records, Gaines strove to bring her music directly via the Internet. In 1997, she released an Internet-only album, Arrival. Limited to 2,000 copies, it was available exclusively through her official website.

In 2003, she released her album You Gave Me Freedom through Dome Records in the UK.

In 2005, Gaines provided her vocals for the single "Dance With Me", which was recorded by K-Klass and released on SUSU Records.

In November 2006, Gaines released her album Welcome to My World for SUSU Records. She also self-released the album Soul Survivor in 2013, which included 5 songs from You Gave Me Freedom alongside new and previously unreleased material.

The compilation albums Essential Rosie, a greatest hits album, and Dance with Me, a club album that includes the singles "Dance with Me" (with K-Klass) and "Release the Pressure" (with Red), were both released in 2015.

== Later life ==
Over the years, Gaines experienced a number of health issues, including diabetes. In 2009, she was admitted into a psychiatric ward after an insulin overdose and seizure. In 2014, she was hospitalized after not taking enough insulin. That same year, a missing person's report was filed by her daughter Latoya to ascertain her whereabouts. She was located in a homeless shelter in Richmond, California, but refused help. She did not receive royalties during this time due to her bank accounts being closed.

In early 2015, Gaines's friend and fellow singer Brenda Vaughn organized a benefit concert in Oakland for her recovery and support. Various notable artists participated, including Lenny Williams, D’Wayne Wiggins of Tony! Toni! Tone!, Wilton Rabb of Graham Central Station, Tuck and Patti, Tony Dwayne and Levi Seacer, Jr.

As of 2016, Gaines was living with her daughter.

== Discography ==
=== Studio albums ===
List of albums, with selected chart positions
Title	Album details	Peak chart positions
Title	Album details	US R&B /HH
Caring	Release date: 1985; Label: Epic; Format: LP, digital download, online streaming	—
Closer than Close	Release date: 1995; Label: Motown (#5305782); Format: CD, cassette, digital download, online streaming	99
Arrival	Release date: 1997; Label: Dredlix, CDBaby (#5637455966); Format: CD digital download, online streaming	—
No Sweeter Love	Release date: November 20, 2000; Due: 1987 (shelved by Epic); Label: Expansion (#ROSIE 1CD); Format: CD, digital download, online streaming	—
You Gave Me Freedom	Release date: 2004; Label: Dome (#DOMECD-48); Format: CD digital download, online streaming	—
Try Me	Release date: 2005; Due: 1994 (shelved); Reworked version of Concrete Jungle; Label: Rosie Gaines; Format: Digital download, online streaming	—
Welcome to My World	Release date: 2006; Label: Susu (#SUALBCD 19); Format: CD, digital download, online streaming	—
Concrete Jungle	Release date: 2010; Due: 1993–1994 (shelved by Paisley Park); Recorded: 1990–1994; Label: Dredlix; Format: Digital download, online streaming	—
Soul Survivor	Release date: February 16, 2013; Label: Rosie Gaines; Format: Digital download, online streaming	—
"—" denotes releases that did not chart.

=== Compilation albums ===
List of albums, with selected details
Title	Album details
Essential Rosie	Release date: 2015; Label: Dredlix (#5638416821); Format: CD, digital download, online streaming
Dance with Me	Release date: 2015; Label: Dredlix (#5638419029); Format: CD digital download, online streaming

=== Extended plays ===
List of extended plays, with selected details
Title	EP details
Be Strong / I Only Wanna Be in Your Arms / Heart Like Stone	Release date: 1991; Label: About Time; Format: 12"

=== Singles ===
==== As lead artist ====
List of singles, with selected chart positions and certifications, showing year released and album name
Title	Year	Peak chart positions									Certifications	Album
Title	Year	US R&B /HH	US Dance	IRE	NZ	SCO	SWE	UK	UK Dance	UK R&B	Certifications	Album
"Skool-ology (Ain't No Strain)"	1985	72	—	—	—	—	—	—	—	—		Caring
"Wake Up"	1985	—	—	—	—	—	—	—	—	—		Caring
"Good Times"	1985	—	—	—	—	—	—	—	—	—		Caring
"Crazy"	1987	—	—	—	—	—	—	—	—	—		No Sweeter Love
"I Want U"	1995	90	28	—	—	—	—	70	10	14		Closer than Close
"Closer than Close"	1997	—	6	11	36	12	53	4	1	—	BPI: Gold	Closer than Close
"I Surrender"	1998	—	16	—	—	47	—	39	4	—		Non-album single
"—" denotes releases that did not chart.

==== As featured artist ====
List of singles, with selected chart positions and certifications, showing year released and album name
Title	Year	Peak chart positions										Certifications	Album
Title	Year	US	US R&B /HH	AUS	CAN	FRA	GER	NZ	SWE	SWI	UK	Certifications	Album
"Gett Off" (Prince and the New Power Generation featuring Tony M. and Rosie Gaines)	1991	21	6	8	25	97	13	13	13	3	4	RIAA: Gold	Diamonds and Pearls
"Diamonds and Pearls" (Prince and the New Power Generation featuring Rosie Gaines)	1991	3	1	13	5	20	28	8	12	7	25		Diamonds and Pearls
"Hang On in There Baby" (Gary Barlow featuring Rosie Gaines)	1998	—	—	—	—	—	69	—	—		—		Open Road
"Dance with Me" (K-Klass featuring Rosie Gaines)	2005	—	—	—	—	—	—	—	—	—	236		Non-album single
"—" denotes releases that did not chart.

==== Promotional singles ====
List of singles, with selected chart positions and certifications, showing year released and album name
Title	Year	Peak chart positions				Album
Title	Year	US Bub.	US Digital	US R&B /HH	US R&B /HH Digital	Album
"Nothing Compares 2 U" (Live) (Prince and the New Power Generation featuring Rosie Gaines)	1993	7	43	66	31	The Hits/The B-Sides

=== Guest appearances ===
List of non-single guest appearances, with other performing artists, showing year released and album name
Title	Year	Other artist(s)	Album
"1 Touch"	2002	Mousse T	Gourmet de Funk
"Don't Let 'Em"	2002	Bootsy Collins, Snoop Dogg, Till Brönner	Play with Bootsy

=== Soundtrack appearances ===
List of non-single soundtrack appearances, with other performing artists, showing year released and soundtrack name
Title	Year	Other artist(s)	Album
"I 2 I"	1995	Tevin Campbell	A Goofy Movie

=== Songwriting discography ===
List of releases by other artists where Rosie Gaines is a credited songwriter
Title	Year	Artist(s)	Writer(s)	Album
"Money Don't Matter 2 Night"	1991	Prince and the New Power Generation	Prince, Rosie Gaines	Diamonds and Pearls
"Push"	1991	Prince and the New Power Generation	Prince, Rosie Gaines	Diamonds and Pearls
"The Voice"	1993	Mavis Staples	Mavis Staples, Prince, Rosie Gaines, Francis Jules	The Voice
