= Batman (score) =

Batman: Original Motion Picture Score

Film score by Danny Elfman
- Released: August 8, 1989
- Recorded: 1988–89
- Studio: CTS Studios
- Genre: Soundtrack
- Length: 54:56
- Label: Warner Bros.
- Producers: Danny Elfman and Steve Bartek

Danny Elfman chronology
Beetlejuice (1988)	Batman: Original Motion Picture Score (1989)	Dick Tracy (1990)

Professional ratings
Review scores
Source	Rating
AllMusic	4.5/5 stars
Filmtracks	5/5 stars
Movie Music UK	5/5 stars
Movie Wave	4/5 stars
Music From The Movies	favorable
Score Sounds	9.5/10 stars
Soundtrack Express	5/5 stars
SoundtrackNet	4.5/5 stars
Static Mass Emporium	5/5 stars

Batman: Original Motion Picture Score is the score album for the 1989 film Batman, composed by Danny Elfman. According to the Batman DVD Special Edition, Elfman said that producer Jon Peters was not sure about him as a composer until director Tim Burton made him play the main titles. Elfman admitted he was stunned when Peters announced that the score would be released on its own album. The score was widely acclaimed by the press and in many contemporary reviews is cited as the highlight of the film.

Elfman's "The Batman Theme" went on to become an iconic piece. It served as the basis for the theme music and played in some episodes of Batman: The Animated Series, which premiered in 1992, although this was later changed. Some parts of the Elfman score are also heard in Static Shock, Lego Batman: The Videogame, Lego Batman 2: DC Super Heroes, Lego Batman 3: Beyond Gotham, the 1989 Batmobile DLC for Batman: Arkham Knight, the 2017 Justice League film (which was also composed by Elfman), DC League of Super-Pets and the Arrowverse crossover Crisis on Infinite Earths. Parts are also played in the queue and on the station platform of Batman the Ride at various Six Flags theme parks.

== Production ==
Burton hired Elfman to compose the music score for Batman. For inspiration, Elfman was given The Dark Knight Returns. Elfman was worried, as he had never worked on a production this large in budget and scale. In an interview with Keyboard in October 1989, Elfman said that he never read Batman as a child, preferring Marvel heroes such as Spider-Man and the Fantastic Four. In addition, producer Jon Peters was skeptical of hiring Elfman, but was later convinced when he heard the opening number. Peters and Peter Guber wanted Prince to write music for the Joker and Michael Jackson to do the romance songs. Elfman would then combine the style of Prince and Jackson's songs together for the entire film score. Elfman worked separately from Prince, who was responsible for writing songs for the film. Prince proposed to extend his songs into the score, and the producers asked Elfman to collaborate with Prince on the score. Elfman refused because he was already working on the score, and did not want to serve as mere music arranger under Prince.

Elfman enlisted the help of Oingo Boingo lead guitarist Steve Bartek and Shirley Walker to arrange the compositions for the orchestra. Elfman was later displeased with the audio mixing of his film score. According to Elfman: "Batman was done in England by technicians who didn't care, and the non-caring showed. I'm not putting down England because they've done gorgeous dubs there, but this particular crew elected not to". Despite it, Elfman included several synthesizer cues in the film, mostly percussion samples. Elfman based his five-note Batman motif on his viewing experience on the rough cut of the film.

In rearranging Stephen Foster's "Beautiful Dreamer", Elfman added a "lovely climax" as the Joker twirls away. Elfman also recorded the composition twice, primarily on the violin. Meanwhile, in recording "Up the Cathedral", Elfman did not use a real church organ, but an electronic organ by Rodgers Instruments. Elfman cites his inspiration for “Up the Cathedral” to Bernard Herrmann’s score for the 1961 film Mysterious Island, a film he enjoyed as a child. "The Batman Theme" was also influenced by Herrmann’s score for the 1959 film Journey to the Center of the Earth, particularly the cues “Mountain Top / Sunrise.”

== Track listing ==
No.	Title	Length
1.	"The Batman Theme"	2:38
2.	"Roof Fight"	1:21
3.	"First Confrontation"	4:45
4.	"Kitchen, Surgery, Face-off"	3:09
5.	"Flowers"	1:51
6.	"Clown Attack"	1:45
7.	"Batman to the Rescue"	3:57
8.	"Roasted Dude"	1:01
9.	"Photos/Beautiful Dreamer"	2:30
10.	"Descent into Mystery"	1:32
11.	"The Bat Cave"	2:34
12.	"The Joker's Poem"	0:58
13.	"Childhood Remembered"	2:42
14.	"Love Theme"	1:29
15.	"Charge of the Batmobile"	1:43
16.	"Attack of the Batwing"	4:46
17.	"Up the Cathedral"	5:06
18.	"Waltz to the Death"	3:56
19.	"The Final Confrontation"	3:49
20.	"Finale"	1:46
21.	"Batman Theme Reprise"	1:27
Total length:		54:56

Additional music credited

No.	Title	Artist(s)	Length
1.	"Theme from A Summer Place"	Percy Faith and his Orchestra
2.	"There'll be a Hot Time in the Old Town Tonight"	Jack Nicholson (Written by Joe Hayden, Theodore A. Metz)

=== Complete score ===
La-La Land Records released Danny Elfman's complete score to Batman on July 27, 2010.

Disc One: Original Score (film version)

No.	Title	Length
1.	"Main Title*"	2:42
2.	"Family*/First Batman*/Roof Fight*"	3:24
3.	"Jack Vs. Eckhardt*"	1:37
4.	"Up Building*/Card Snap*"	1:54
5.	"Bat Zone*/Axis Set-Up*"	1:55
6.	"Shootout*"	5:42
7.	"Dinner Transition*/Kitchen Dinner* (**)/Surgery*"	3:00
8.	"Face–Off* (**)/Beddy Bye*"	3:59
9.	"Roasted Dude*"	1:03
10.	"Vicki Spies (Flowers)*"	1:56
11.	"Clown Attack*"	1:59
12.	"Photos*/Beautiful Dreamer* (***)"	2:30
13.	"Men at Work*"	0:33
14.	"Paper Spin*/Alicia’s Mask*"	0:30
15.	"Vicki Gets a Gift*"	1:13
16.	"Alicia’s Unmasking*"	1:10
17.	"Batman to the Rescue*/Batmobile Charge*/Street Fight*"	4:25
18.	"Descent into Mystery*"	1:33
19.	"Bat Cave*/Paper Throw*"	2:48
20.	"The Joker’s Poem*"	0:59
21.	"Sad Pictures*"	0:38
22.	"Dream*/Challenge*/Tender Bat Cave* (**)"	4:28
23.	"Charge of the Batmobile*"	1:43
24.	"Joker Flies to Gotham (Unused)*/Batwing I*"	0:31
25.	"Batwing II*/Batwing III*"	6:02
26.	"Cathedral Chase*"	5:07
27.	"Waltz to the Death*"	3:58
28.	"Showdown I*/Showdown II*"	5:05
29.	"Finale* (**)"	1:47
30.	"End Credits*"	1:29

Disc Two: Original Soundtrack Album (remastered)(tracks 22-29 are bonus cues)

No.	Title	Length
1.	"The Batman Theme"	2:37
2.	"Roof Fight"	1:22
3.	"First Confrontation"	4:43
4.	"Kitchen/Surgery/Face–Off**"	3:09
5.	"Flowers"	1:51
6.	"Clown Attack"	1:46
7.	"Batman to the Rescue"	3:57
8.	"Roasted Dude"	1:02
9.	"Photos/Beautiful Dreamer***"	2:31
10.	"Descent into Mystery"	1:33
11.	"The Bat Cave"	2:35
12.	"The Joker's Poem"	0:59
13.	"Childhood Remembered"	2:43
14.	"Love Theme**"	1:30
15.	"Charge of the Batmobile"	1:41
16.	"Attack of the Batwing"	4:45
17.	"Up the Cathedral"	5:05
18.	"Waltz to the Death"	3:56
19.	"The Final Confrontation"	3:48
20.	"Finale (**) (***)"	1:46
21.	"Batman Theme Reprise"	1:31
22.	"News Theme"	0:11
23.	"Joker's Commercial*"	1:23
24.	"Joker's Muzak (unused)*"	1:15
25.	"Main Title (alt 1)*"	2:42
26.	"Photos*/Beautiful Dreamer (alt)* (**)"	2:33
27.	"Batman to the Rescue (original ending)*"	0:52
28.	"Charge of the Batmobile (film edit)*"	1:47
29.	"Main Title (alt 2)*"	2:47

(*) Previously unreleased
(**) includes "Scandalous!" composed by Prince with John L. Nelson
(***) includes "Beautiful Dreamer" composed by Stephen Foster

== Chart positions ==
Chart (1989)	Peak position
Canada Top Albums/CDs (RPM)	71
U.S. Billboard 200	30
