= The Future (song) =

- German 7-inch single

Single by Prince

from the album Batman
- B-side: "Electric Chair"
- Released: May 18, 1990
- Recorded: Mid–late February 1989
- Studio: Paisley Park, Chanhassen
- Genre: Electro-funk; synth-pop; minimalist
- Length: 7-inch remix edit: 3:30; Album: 4:08; Remix: 6:25
- Label: Warner Bros.
- Songwriter: Prince
- Producers: Prince (original); Mark Moore & William Orbit (remix)

Prince singles chronology
"Scandalous!" (1989)	"The Future" (1990)	"Thieves in the Temple" (1990)

"The Future" is a song from American musician Prince's 1989 Batman soundtrack, and the final single released from the album. The single was not the album version, but a remixed version by S'Express' Mark Moore and William Orbit. "The Future" was released as a single only in Europe. The standard European 7-inch single was backed with the album version of "Electric Chair", but on the maxi-single, "Electric Chair" was also remixed by Moore and Orbit. Moore and Orbit's remix of "The Future" is house-inspired, whereas Prince's original is minimalistic. Moore and Orbit substituted a muted, pulsating beat in place of the original elements of Prince's song. Moore and Orbit also removed Prince's original bassline, synthline, and snippets of sampled dialogue. This would be the last time Orbit would work with Prince for several years. In most countries, neither "The Future" nor its B-side were a hit on the pop or dance floors. The single peaked at #9 in the Dutch charts.

The LP version of "The Future" features the sampled strings of Clare Fischer lifted from the then-unreleased 1986 track "Crystal Ball", and samples the Sounds of Blackness choir. The lyrics speak of a bleak future, recalling the fictional DC Comics location Gotham City, and that it needs "spirituality that will last".

"Electric Chair" was recorded well before the album concept had begun, being cut in June 1988. Despite this, it fits well into the theme of the film and evokes the Joker's madness. The track blends hard rock and funk with a loud, booming drum machine pattern, and aggressive bass and lead guitar wailing throughout. The bridge combines a funky, percussive bass line with a meshed guitar synth phrase. A raspy grunt from "Electric Chair" can be heard in the Underworld remix of William Orbit's "Water From A Vine Leaf" as well as some tracks from Underworld's Dubnobasswithmyheadman, perhaps owing to Underworld's Karl Hyde serving as guitarist at Prince's Paisley Park in 1989.

== Critical reception ==
Pan-European magazine Music & Media wrote, "A brilliant house remix of one of the best tracks on Batman by Mark Moore (S'Express) and William Orbit. The track has been skilfully converted into an up-to-date dance floor number".

== Track listings ==
- 7-inch single
1. "The Future" (remix edit) – 3:30
2. "Electric Chair" – 4:13
- 12-inch / CD single
1. "The Future" (remix) – 6:25
2. "Electric Chair" (remix) – 5:36

== Personnel ==
Credits from Benoît Clerc and Guitarcloud

- Prince – lead vocals, Fairlight CMI, Roland D-50, synthesizers, electric guitar, bass guitar, Dynacord ADD-One, LinnDrum, fingersnaps, Publison IM-90 Infernal Machine
- Sounds of Blackness – choir
- Clare Fischer – orchestration

== Charts ==
=== Weekly charts ===
Weekly chart performance for "The Future"
Chart (1990)	Peak position
Belgium (Ultratop 50 Flanders)	22
Europe (Eurochart Hot 100)	66
Italy (Musica e Dischi)	20
Netherlands (Dutch Top 40)	7
Netherlands (Single Top 100)	9
Switzerland (Schweizer Hitparade)	15
West Germany (GfK)	39

=== Year-end charts ===
Year-end chart performance for "The Future"
Chart (1990)	Position
Netherlands (Dutch Top 40)	74
Netherlands (Single Top 100)	62
