= The Arms of Orion =

1989 single by Prince

- US 7" single

Single by Prince with Sheena Easton

from the album Batman
- B-side: "I Love U in Me"
- Released: October 16, 1989
- Recorded: January 25, 1989
- Studio: Paisley Park, Chanhassen
- Genre: Orchestral pop
- Length: 3:52 (7-inch edit); 5:03 (album version)
- Label: Warner Bros.
- Composer: Prince
- Lyricist: Sheena Easton
- Producer: Prince

Prince with Sheena Easton singles chronology
"Partyman" (1989)	"The Arms of Orion" (1989)	"Scandalous!" (1989)

"The Arms of Orion" is a 1989 song by American musician Prince and Scottish singer and actress Sheena Easton. It was the third single to be taken from Prince's 1989 Batman soundtrack album. It was a Top 40 hit for them on the Billboard Hot 100 and US Cash Box Top 100 charts in 1989, peaking at #36 and #33 respectively.

== Background ==
The song is a slow, romantic ballad that is accompanied mainly by the piano. Synthesizers also play a strong role throughout the song, programmed to emulate a string section. The track also uses a subdued LinnDrum loop, and samples of rain and thunder. The lyrics, written by Sheena Easton at Prince's suggestion, allude to the constellation of Orion. Prince had to surrender all publishing rights to the songs on the Batman album including "The Arms of Orion" to Warner Bros. as part of the deal to compose, perform, and produce the soundtrack.

== Critical reception ==
David Giles from Music Week wrote, "Decidedly MOR ballad from the Batman LP which finds Prince duetting with Sheena Easton, the pair of them not sounding unlike Lionel Richie and Whitney Houston. Commercially viable, but once again "his highness" will get away with producing sub-standard floss." Pan-European magazine Music & Media called single "probably the most commercial track from the Batman LP." William Shaw of Smash Hits was disappointed by material: "Unconvincing love ballad, with quite the corniest words ever about love and the stars and stuff."

== Track listings ==
- 7-inch single
1. "The Arms of Orion" (edit) – 3:52
2. "I Love U in Me" – 4:12
- 12-inch single
1. "The Arms of Orion" – 5:03
2. "I Love U in Me" – 4:12
3. "The Arms of Orion" (edit) – 3:52

== Personnel ==
Credits from Benoît Clerc and Guitarcloud

- Prince – lead and backing vocals, piano, Wurlitzer electric piano, Roland D-50, synthesizers, bass guitar, LinnDrum, Dynacord ADD-One, finger cymbals, triangle
- Sheena Easton – lead vocals

== Charts ==
Weekly chart performance for "The Arms of Orion"
Chart (1989)	Peak position
Australia (ARIA)	108
Belgium (Ultratop 50 Flanders)	33
Italy Airplay (Music & Media)	19
Netherlands (Single Top 100)	13
New Zealand (Recorded Music NZ)	44
UK Singles (Official Charts)	27
US Billboard Hot 100	36
US Cash Box Top 100	33
