= Caring (album) =

Studio album by Rosie Gaines
- Released: October 8, 1985
- Recorded: 1985
- Genre: Pop; R&B
- Length: 43:20
- Label: Epic
- Producer: Rosie Gaines; Don Cornelius

Rosie Gaines chronology
Caring (1985)	No Sweeter Love (1987)

Caring is the debut album by American singer Rosie Gaines, released October 8, 1985.

== Track listing ==
1. "Dance All Night Long" – 5:52
2. "I've Gone Too Far" – 4:40
3. "Skool-ology (Ain't No Strain)" – 3:56
4. "Caring" – 6:41
5. "Frustration" – 4:15
6. "Wake Up" – 5:17
7. "Good Times" – 5:20
8. "What Are We Coming To" – 3:55
9. "Innocent Girl" – 3:24

== Personnel ==
- Rosie Gaines - vocals, backing vocals, piano, electric piano, synthesizer, percussion
- Dan Huff, Levi Seacer, Jr., Steph Birnbaum - guitar
- Curtis Ohlson - guitar, bass
- Dave Goldblatt, Denzil "Broadway" Miller, Frank Martin, Greg Phillinganes - synthesizer
- Mick Mestick, Paul Van Wageningen - drums
- Paulinho da Costa - percussion
- Marc Russo - alto saxophone
- Wilton Felder - tenor saxophone

== Singles ==
"Skool-ology (Ain't No Strain)"

1. "Skool-ology (Ain't No Strain)" (Extended Version) – 5:24
2. "Skool-ology (Ain't No Strain)" (Extended Instrumental Version) – 5:24
