= Tyka Nelson =

American singer (1960–2024)

- Born: Tyka Evene Nelson; May 18, 1960; Minneapolis, Minnesota, U.S.
- Died: November 4, 2024 (aged 64); Robbinsdale, Minnesota, U.S.
- Occupation: Singer
- Years active: 1980–2024
- Notable work: Marc Anthony's Tune; Royal Blue
- Spouse: Maurice Phillips
- Children: 6
- Parents: John L. Nelson (father); Mattie Della Shaw (mother)
- Relatives: Prince (brother)

Tyka Evene Nelson (May 18, 1960 – November 4, 2024) was an American singer. She was the daughter of jazz musician John L. Nelson (1916–2001) and jazz singer Mattie Della Shaw (1933–2002), and the sister of Prince (1958–2016). In addition, she had seven half-siblings. She was Prince's only full sibling.

== Career ==
She released four albums between 1988 and 2011, and reached No. 33 on the Billboard Hot R&B/Hip-Hop Songs chart in July 1988 with "Marc Anthony's Tune", produced by Larry Graham.

== Later life ==
After a protracted probate following Prince’s death in 2016, Tyka Nelson was ruled to be one of the six legal heirs. In 2022, she sold all but 2% of her shares to Primary Wave, a music management firm based in New York. She also accepted Prince's American Music Award for Top Soundtrack following his death in 2016. Her last public performance was in Australia in 2018, although she tried to make another performance in June 2024. In July 2021, she agreed to sell 90% of the shares she had in Prince's estate, with her half-brother Omarr Baker and late half brother Alfred Jackson's interest selling 100% of their shares. In June 2024, she retired from music after falling ill and failing to make a planned concert performance. At the time of her retirement, she stated that she was working on a memoir.

== Personal life and death ==
Nelson was born in Minneapolis on May 18, 1960. She was married to Maurice Phillips, and had six children. At the time of her death in November 2024, it was revealed that aside from three half siblings, she was survived by her two sons Sir and President and five of her grandchildren. Nelson and President co-designed Prince's urn.

Her half sister Lorna Nelson died in 2006. Half brother Alfred Jackson died in August 2019. Her eldest half brother John R. Nelson died on September 3, 2021.

Nelson died at North Memorial Hospital in Robbinsdale, Minnesota, on November 4, 2024, at the age of 64. She had reportedly been ill since June 2024.

== Discography ==
Albums

- Royal Blue (Cooltempo, 1988)
- Yellow Moon, Red Sky (CMC International Records, 1992)
- A Brand New Me (2008) – Grammy Award Consideration
- Hustler (2011)
