= Closer than Close (Rosie Gaines album) =

Studio album by Rosie Gaines
- Released: June 13, 1995
- Recorded: 1995
- Length: 1:05:41 (U.S. version); 1:12:04 (International version)
- Label: Motown Records
- Producer: Rosie Gaines, Francis Jules

Rosie Gaines chronology
Try Me (1994)	Closer than Close (1995)	Arrival (1997)

Professional ratings
Review scores
Source	Rating
AllMusic	3/5 stars
Cash Box	(mixed)
Entertainment Weekly	B+
Music Week	3/5 stars
Muzik	3.5/5 stars

Closer than Close is the fourth album by American singer Rosie Gaines, released on June 13, 1995. The album's title track was remixed and released as a single in 1997, reaching number four on the UK Singles Chart. "I Want U" was also released as a single, reaching number 70 in the UK. Prince provides backing vocals on the track "My Tender Heart".

== Track listing ==
All tracks are written by Rosie Gaines, Francis Jules and Dana Bailey; except where noted.

American edition
No.	Title	Writer(s)	Length
1.	"I Want U (Inner City Blue)" (Earth Mama Version)	Prince, Rosie Gaines	6:34
2.	"Are You Ready"		5:49
3.	"Closer than Close"		5:09
4.	"Googaga"		3:55
5.	"Turn Your Lights Down Low"	Bob Marley	4:29
6.	"My Tender Heart"	Prince, Gaines	5:10
7.	"I Almost Lost You"		2:37
8.	"Slowman"		5:33
9.	"Can You Handle It"		5:13
10.	"Concrete Jungle"	Marley	7:48
11.	"Get the Ghetto off Your Mind"		5:52
12.	"December 25th"		3:56
13.	"I Want U" (Purple Version)	Prince, Gaines	3:36
Total length:			1:05:41

- Note: Tracks 4–7 and 11 are reworked versions from the then-unreleased album Concrete Jungle.

International version
No.	Title	Length
1.	"I Want U" (Purple Version)	3:36
2.	"Are You Ready"	5:49
3.	"Closer than Close"	5:09
4.	"Googaga"	3:55
5.	"Ooh La La"	4:41
6.	"Turn Your Lights Down Low"	4:29
7.	"My Tender Heart"	5:10
8.	"I Almost Lost You"	2:37
9.	"Slowman"	5:33
10.	"Can You Handle It"	5:13
11.	"Concrete Jungle"	7:48
12.	"Get the Ghetto off Your Mind"	5:52
13.	"December 25"	3:56
14.	"Bubbly World" (bonus track)	5:05
15.	"Do What U Wanna Do" (bonus track)	3:11
Total length:		1:12:04
