= Closer than Close (Rosie Gaines song) =

1997 single by Rosie Gaines

Single by Rosie Gaines

from the album Closer than Close
- Released: May 19, 1997
- Genre: Dance; garage house; diva house
- Length: 3:44
- Label: Big Bang
- Songwriters: Dana Bailey; Francis Jules; Rosie Gaines
- Producer: Mentor

Rosie Gaines singles chronology
| "I Want U" (1995) | "Closer than Close" (1997) | "I Surrender" (1997) |

Music video
- "Closer than Close" on YouTube

"Closer than Close" is a song by American musician Rosie Gaines, a former singer in Prince's band the New Power Generation. It is co-written by Gaines with Dana Bailey and Francis Jules. After being released in 1995 as a track on her fifth album of the same name (1995), bootlegs of garage mixes started appearing. This started a two-year mission by Glaswegian house and garage indie label Big Bang Records to release the track properly in 1997. It peaked at number four in the UK and number six on the US Billboard Hot Dance Club Play chart. "Closer than Close" is Gaines' most successful song to date, and widely considered as a club classic.

== Background and release ==
After her solo debut in 1985, recording/performing with the Curtis Ohlson Band from 1987 to 1989 and doing other projects, singer Rosie Gaines joined Prince & the New Power Generation. She continued afterwards as a solo artist/session singer and released her fifth album, Closer than Close in 1995 before she was dropped from Motown Records. Two years later, a remix of the title track from the album was released as a single by Big Bang Records, after it had appeared on bootlegs. It was highly successful in the UK, reaching number four on the UK Singles Chart in May 1997.

"We knew it was a good record but exactly how well it did was a complete surprise. The speed garage angle was a tag that was put on Rosie Gaines by DJs and clubbers. It wasn't a case of us putting the record out to exploit a growing scene."

— Big Bang head of A&R Scott Gibson talking to Music Week about the song.

Additionally, it peaked at number 11 in Ireland, number 23 in Iceland and number 36 in New Zealand. On the Eurochart Hot 100, the single peaked at number 14. It was produced by DJ Hippie Torrales and Mark Mendoza and has sold over 8 million units worldwide. "Closer than Close" went on to become a huge club favorite and earned Gaines a MOBO Award for Best International Single at the '97 Awards show, beating off the likes of Puff Daddy, R. Kelly and Tina Moore. A music video was made to accompany the remix, featuring Gaines performing in a club.

== Critical reception ==
Joe Rassenfoss from US newspaper Citizens Voice said that the 1995 version of "Closer than Close" "finds Gaines at home in a slower groove, her voice weaving mellifluously." Scottish newspaper Daily Record called the 1997 remix a "forgettable funk song from former Prince sidekick Rosie, who is now setting out to become a star in her own right." James Hyman from Music Week's RM gave it a score of four out of five, describing it as a "bumpy house track that's already received endless radio play, especially on Kiss. Commercially comparable to the Nightcrawlers' 'Push the Feeling On', this "Let's get close, closer yeah, closer than you can ever imagine us", title hook rests over a strong clacking house beat with simple chord changes throughout plus short scats thrown into the mix." He concluded, "A clear Top 10 hit."

== Impact and legacy ==
In 2015, The Daily Telegraph ranked "Closer than Close" at number 38 in their Top 50 Dance Songs list. In 2017, Dave Fawbert from ShortList described it as an "eternal banger". In 2019, Mixmag listed it in their two lists, the "20 Best Diva House Tracks" and the "40 Best UK Garage Tracks of 1995 to 2005". They wrote, "This is one of the most memorable vocal dance tracks out there, impressing with its bouncy style and smile-evoking vigour. The way Gaines sings “closer than you ever can imagine uuuuus” is just so saucy, and primed for a catchy sing-a-long. It became a smash hit on the UK dance & underground charts when the remix was released, catapulting garage house to the mainstream. This track has longevity in clubs and is still routinely played in living room afters across the country as the sun’s coming through the curtains." Gemtracks included the "Mentor Remake" of the song in their list of the "Top UK garage songs between 1995–2005".

== Track listing ==
- UK, 12-inch single (1997)
1. "Closer than Close" (Mentor remake)
2. "Closer than Close" (Tuff Jam's unda vybe)
3. "Closer than Close" (Frankie's climatic revelation)
- Europe, CD maxi (1997)
1. "Closer than Close" (Mentor original radio edit) — 3:44
2. "Closer than Close" (Mentor remake radio edit) — 3:51
- Europe, CD maxi (1997)
1. "Closer than Close" (Mentor original radio edit) — 3:44
2. "Closer than Close" (Frankie's classic radio edit) — 4:08
3. "Closer than Close" (Mentor remake) — 6:39
4. "Closer than Close" (Mentor club mix) — 7:28
5. "Closer than Close" (Tuff Jam's "Even Closer" mix) — 6:59
6. "Closer than Close" (Frankie's classic club mix) — 10:20

== Charts ==
=== Weekly charts ===
| Chart (1997) | Peak position |
|---|---|
| Europe (Eurochart Hot 100) | 14 |
| France Airplay (SNEP) | 12 |
| Iceland (Íslenski Listinn Topp 40) | 23 |
| Ireland (IRMA) | 11 |
| Israel (Israeli Singles Chart) | 5 |
| New Zealand (Recorded Music NZ) | 36 |
| Scottish Singles Sales (Official Charts) | 12 |
| Sweden (Sverigetopplistan) | 53 |
| UK Singles (Official Charts) | 4 |
| UK Dance (Official Charts) | 1 |
| US Dance Club Play (Billboard) | 6 |

=== Year-end charts ===
| Chart (1997) | Position |
|---|---|
| UK Singles (OCC) | 45 |

== Certifications ==
| Region | Certification | Certified units/sales |
|---|---|---|
| United Kingdom (BPI) | Gold | 400,000^{‡} |
^{‡} Sales+streaming figures based on certification alone.
