= John L. Nelson =

American jazz musician (1916–2001)

Background information
- Born: John Lewis Nelson; June 29, 1916; Webster Parish, Louisiana, U.S.
- Died: August 25, 2001 (aged 85) Chanhassen, Minnesota, U.S.
- Genre: Jazz
- Occupation: Musician
- Years active: 1948–1966

John Lewis Nelson (June 29, 1916 – August 25, 2001), also known by his stage name Prince Rogers, was an American jazz musician and songwriter. He was the father of musicians Prince and Tyka Nelson and a credited co-writer on some of his son's songs.

== Personal life ==
Nelson was born in Webster Parish, Louisiana, one of five children born to Carrie (née Jenkins) and Clarence Nelson. He traveled to Minneapolis to become a musician in 1948. Playing the piano, Nelson used "Prince Rogers" as a stage name and started a band called "The Prince Rogers Trio" with local musicians.

In 1956, he met Mattie Della Shaw (November 11, 1933 – February 15, 2002) at a show on the north side of Minneapolis. Shaw was a jazz musician who became the musical group's singer. She had one son, Alfred Frank Alonzo Jackson (July 6, 1953 – August 29, 2019). Nelson married Shaw on August 31, 1957, and the couple had two more children, Prince (1958–2016, a musician who was named after his father's stage name) and Tyka Nelson (1960–2024, a singer). The couple formally separated in 1965 and were divorced on September 24, 1968.

John Nelson's grandfather, Rev. Edward "Ed." Nelson was born to a White slaveowner, John Nelson, and his Cherokee wife. Rev. Ed became a travelling preacher for the Colored Methodist Episcopal Church and married Emma, a Black woman.

== Death ==
Nelson died on August 25, 2001, aged 85, in his home in Chanhassen, Minnesota. That year Prince dedicated Joni Mitchell's song "A Case of U", on his One Nite Alone... album, to his father.

Nelson's death occurred on the same day as Aaliyah, an R&B, pop and hip hop singer who died as a result of a plane crash near The Bahamas.

== Collaboration with Prince ==
John L. Nelson wrote (or co-wrote) some music that was released by Prince in the 1980s.

=== ASCAP credits ===
ASCAP credits, or co-credits, him with the following:

- "Father’s Song" and "Purple Rain Cues", from the film Purple Rain, 1984
- "Computer Blue" from the Purple Rain album and film, 1984
- "Around the World in a Day" (composed with David Coleman and Prince) and "The Ladder" (composed with Prince), from the album Around the World in a Day, 1985
- "Christopher Tracy’s Parade" (composed with Prince) and "Under the Cherry Moon" (composed with Prince) from the album Parade, 1986
- "Under the Cherry Moon Cues" from the film Under the Cherry Moon, 1986
- "Scandalous!" from the Batman album and film, 1989
