= Partyman =

- US 7-inch single

Single by Prince

from the album Batman
- B-side: "Feel U Up"
- Released: August 18, 1989
- Recorded: March 1989
- Studio: Paisley Park, Chanhassen
- Genre: Pop; funk
- Length: 3:11 (album/7-inch version); 6:02 (12" video mix)
- Label: Warner Bros.
- Songwriter: Prince
- Producer: Prince

Prince singles chronology
"Batdance" (1989)	"Partyman" (1989)	"The Arms of Orion" (1989)

"Partyman" is a song by American musician Prince from his 1989 Batman album, and the follow-up to his number one hit, "Batdance". The song is one of the few on the album to be prominently featured in the film, accompanying the scene in which the Joker and his minions deface exhibits in the Gotham City Art Museum before meeting Vicki Vale.

The song was inspired by Prince's meeting with Jack Nicholson on-set during the filming of Batman. Prince remarked in a 1990 interview, "[Nicholson] had this attitude that reminded me of Morris [Day] — and there was that song."

The upbeat and humorous number features horn samples and Prince's sped-up "Camille" vocals. The 12" single extends the song to about six minutes in length (labeled as the "Video Mix"), and features the B-side "Feel U Up", a previously unreleased Camille track which would later be available on The Hits/The B-Sides (1993) compilation. "Feel U Up" was originally cut in 1981, but re-recorded in 1986 for the Camille album.

The 12" single also included a "Purple Party Mix", which starts with a string of samples from Prince's earlier hits and contains different lyrics. A track identified as a "music mix" is an instrumental of the "Purple Party Mix". The bassline shares great similarities to "Talkin' Loud and Sayin' Nothing" by James Brown (Prince himself, unsurprisingly, was heavily influenced by Brown). The song's chant "young and old, gather round; everybody hail the new king in town" follows the same rhythm from the 1986 outtake "Rebirth of the Flesh".

== Chart performance ==
The song became one of two Batman singles to perform better in the UK (along with The Arms of Orion), where it peaked at number 14, than in the US, where it peaked at number 18. This falls in line with the brief pattern that was first seen with Lovesexy in which Prince's singles found more consistent success in the UK than in the US.

== Music video ==
The song's accompanying music video, filmed in Culver City, California in August 1989 and directed by Albert Magnoli, again presents Prince's "Gemini" alter ego dressed in a "half-Joker" costume. The video features Dutch musician Candy Dulfer on saxophone. Due to licensing problems, "Partyman", like all of the Batman-era hits, has failed to appear on any Prince compilation album with the exception of the UK singles promoting The Hits/The B-Sides. The song's streams increased when it was featured in an episode of the 2020 documentary series The Last Dance.

== Formats and track listings ==
- 7-inch single
1. "Partyman" – 3:11
2. "Feel U Up" (Short Stroke) – 3:44
- 12-inch single (US)
1. "Partyman" (The Purple Party Mix) – 6:02
2. "Partyman" (Partyman Music Mix) – 4:31
3. "Partyman" (The Video Mix) – 6:20
4. "Feel U Up" (Short Stroke) – 3:44
- 12-inch single (UK)
1. "Partyman" (Video Mix) – 6:20
2. "Feel U Up" (Long Stroke) – 6:28

== Personnel ==
Credits from Benoît Clerc and Guitarcloud

- Prince – lead and backing vocals, Fairlight CMI, synthesizers, piano, electric guitars, bass guitar, Dynacord ADD-One, Linn LM-1, Publison IM90 Infernal Machine
- Anna Fantastic – spoken word
- Femi Jiya – spoken word
- Candy Dulfer – saxophone (12" single and music video versions)

== Charts ==
Weekly chart performance for "Partyman"
Chart (1989)	Peak position
Australia (ARIA)	38
Belgium (Ultratop 50 Flanders)	16
Denmark (IFPI)	10
Finland (Suomen virallinen lista)	9
Italy (Musica e Dischi)	11
Italy Airplay (Music & Media)	7
Luxembourg (Radio Luxembourg)	13
Netherlands (Dutch Top 40)	17
Netherlands (Single Top 100)	16
New Zealand (Recorded Music NZ)	16
Switzerland (Schweizer Hitparade)	25
UK Singles (Official Charts)	14
US Billboard Hot 100	18
US Cash Box Top 100	15
West Germany (GfK)	32
