= Batdance =

1989 song by Prince

- US 7-inch single

Single by Prince

from the album Batman
- B-side: "200 Balloons"
- Released: June 8, 1989
- Recorded: Mid–late March 1989
- Studio: Paisley Park, Chanhassen
- Genre: Rock; funk; dance
- Length: 4:06 (7-inch edit); 6:13 (album and 12-inch version)
- Label: Warner Bros.
- Songwriter: Prince
- Producer: Prince

Prince singles chronology
"Erotic City" (1988)	"Batdance" (1989)	"Partyman" (1989)

"Batdance" is a song by American musician Prince, from the 1989 Batman soundtrack. It was released in June 1989 by Warner Bros. Helped by the film's popularity, the song reached number one in the US, becoming Prince's fourth American number-one single and served as his first number-one hit since "Kiss" in 1986.

== Song development ==
"Batdance" was a last-minute replacement for a brooding track titled "Dance with the Devil", which Prince felt was too dark. (Although "Dance with the Devil" remains unreleased, some of the lyrics appear in the album's liner notes.)

"Batdance" is almost two songs in one - a chaotic, mechanical dance beat that changes gears into a slinky, funky groove before changing back for the song's conclusion (except on the single version in which it eliminates the guitar solo before the middle section, then goes straight to the mechanical Joker laughter from the end of the movie and an earlier movie soundbyte of Michael Keaton saying "Stop"). The track is an amalgam of many musical ideas of Prince's at the time. Elements from at least seven songs (some unreleased) were incorporated into "Batdance": "200 Balloons", "We Got the Power", "House in Order", "Rave Unto the Joy Fantastic" (later released on the album Rave Un2 the Joy Fantastic), "The Future", and "Electric Chair". Some of these were mere snippets, and other segments showed up only in remixes of the track. The song was also loaded with dialogue samples from the film, making it one of the earlier songs where Prince dabbled in sampling. It also contains an interpolation of the theme song to the 1960s Batman television series.

== Critical reception ==
Jerry Smith from Music Week said, "With a mess of samples thrown in, it settles into a delicious funky groove that ends too soon. Sure to be massive and not only in Gotham City, Batfreaks!" Mike Soutar from Smash Hits wrote, "Granted, he sings on a bit of it, but for the most part all you can hear is that jing-jing-ka-jinga-jing guitar noise that Prince has been putting on most of his records since "Kiss". Over and above that there are what presumably are cut-ups of dialogue from the film, mad laughter and some demented screaming. Very odd indeed."

== Music video ==
The song's accompanying music video was filmed on May 27 and 28, 1989 in Culver City, California. It was directed by Albert Magnoli and choreographed by Barry Lather, and featured dancers costumed as multiple Batmen, Jokers and Vicki Vales. Prince appears as a costumed character in face paint known as "Gemini", with one side of his face and costume representing the Joker (evil) and the other, Batman (good). This creation was also likely a nod to one of Batman's classic adversaries, "Two-Face", who also has his face split down the middle (with one side disfigured) and whose alter ego Harvey Dent had originally appeared in the 1989 movie, with the villain himself set to appear in later sequels.

The video starts with Prince receiving a transmission from Gemini where he makes a face. The Batman and Jokers alternate dance sections, while Prince (as both himself and Gemini) sings. The video ends with Gemini hitting a detonator, exploding an electric chair (referenced in the song), and Prince (actually Michael Keaton's voice) saying "Stop" as the video abruptly ends. The video also features one Vicki Vale wearing a black dress with the words "All this and brains too", a reference to The Dark Knight Returns by Frank Miller, in which a female news presenter wears a top with the same slogan.

Gemini is Prince's astrological sign, and is a reference to the duality in his music. "Gemini" would also make an appearance in the "Partyman" video, but this time the costume would be all-Joker. The video earned Prince a 1990 Soul Train Music Award nomination for Best R&B/Soul Music Video, and nomination for Best Video From a Film from the MTV Video Music Awards of the same year.

== B-side ==
The B-side to the "Batdance" is "200 Balloons", which was recorded for the film and serves as the musical blueprint for the main portion of "Batdance". The song was rejected for the film by Tim Burton and replaced with "Trust". The lyrics of "200 Balloons" reference the scene which it was created for to a greater degree than the replacement track, which is only connected to the scene by the Joker asking "Who do you trust?" after the song ends. Prince did little more than replace the lyrics of "200 Balloons" in its transition into "Batdance". Only musical portions survived the transition, but full lyrics showed up in "The Batmix" (turn your head to the east, I be coming from the west). "200 Balloons" also contains samples of "House in Order" and "Rave Unto the Joy Fantastic"; the latter was another song submitted for inclusion in the movie, but rejected (it was replaced by "Partyman").

== Remixes ==
The 7-inch edit of the song is the album version without the guitar solo and the up-tempo part near the end.

The 12-inch vinyl and CD Maxi versions of the single included two remixes of "Batdance" that were done by Mark Moore and William Orbit, "The Batmix" and "Vicki Vale Mix". "The Batmix" focuses on the chaotic "rock" section of "Batdance", and is supplemented with electronic distortion and sampling of voices, instruments, and larger excerpts of Prince's then-unreleased "Rave Un2 the Joy Fantastic". The "Vicki Vale Mix" is an extension of the middle part of "Batdance", which includes dialogue between Bruce Wayne and Vicki Vale. In addition to "200 Balloons", the CD Maxi single (9–21257–2) features both of these remixes.

In November 2013, an unreleased mix leaked online that featured a rap by Big Daddy Kane. The remix was done by John Luongo, who confirmed its existence. According to Luongo, the reason for the remix being unreleased was that Warner Bros. Records did not like it because it was "too different" and refused its release, while Prince was pleased with the outcome.

A bootleg copy of an "original version" mix exists, which runs 8 minutes 47 seconds long; this iteration features all of the sections present in the album/12" version, but with extended instrumental sections and added vocal samples throughout, notably reincorporating more samples and cues from "200 Balloons"/"House in Order" and "Rave Unto the Joy Fantastic", as well as an added slowed down jazz section between the Joker's "And where is the Batman?" sample and the guitar solo section as they appear on the final track; the "Vicki Vale" section is the only part wholly unaltered from its final iteration.

== Track listings ==
- 7-inch single
1. "Batdance" (edit) – 4:06
2. "200 Balloons" – 5:05
- 12-inch / CD single
1. "Batdance" – 6:13
2. "200 Balloons" – 5:05
- 12-inch / CD maxi single
1. "Batdance" (The Batmix) – 7:15
2. "Batdance" (Vicky Vale mix) – 5:55
3. "200 Balloons" – 5:05
- 12-inch promo
1. "Batdance" (The Batmix) – 7:15
2. "Batdance" (The Batmix radio edit) – 4:09
3. "Batdance" (Vicky Vale mix) – 5:55
4. "Batdance" (Vicky Vale mix radio edit) – 4:13
- Unreleased (unofficially leaked)
1. "Batdance" (Extended) – 8:51

== Personnel ==
Credits from Benoît Clerc and Guitarcloud

- Prince – lead and backing vocals, Fairlight CMI, synthesizers, electric guitars, bass guitar, Dynacord ADD-One, LinnDrum, Simmons SDSV, Publison IM-90 Infernal Machine
- Chuck Zwicky – programming

== Charts ==
=== Weekly charts ===
Weekly chart performance for "Batdance"
Chart (1989)	Peak position
Australia (ARIA)	2
Austria (Ö3 Austria Top 40)	17
Belgium (Ultratop 50 Flanders)	5
Canada Retail Singles (The Record)	1
Canada Top Singles (RPM)	1
Canada Dance/Urban (RPM)	2
Denmark (IFPI)	3
Europe (Eurochart Hot 100)	1
Finland (Suomen virallinen lista)	4
France (SNEP)	5
Ireland (IRMA)	2
Italy (Musica e dischi)	2
Italy Airplay (Music & Media)	3
Luxembourg (Radio Luxembourg)	2
Netherlands (Dutch Top 40)	4
Netherlands (Single Top 100)	4
New Zealand (Recorded Music NZ)	1
Norway (VG-lista)	1
Sweden (Sverigetopplistan)	5
Switzerland (Schweizer Hitparade)	1
UK Singles (Official Charts)	2
US Billboard Hot 100	1
US Alternative Airplay (Billboard)	18
US Dance Club Songs (Billboard)	1
US Dance Singles Sales (Billboard)	1
US Hot R&B/Hip-Hop Songs (Billboard)	1
US Cash Box Top 100	1
West Germany (GfK)	10

=== Year-end charts ===
Year-end chart performance for "Batdance"
Chart (1989)	Position
Australia (ARIA)	19
Belgium (Ultratop)	57
Canada Top Singles (RPM)	17
Europe (Eurochart Hot 100)	10
Netherlands (Dutch Top 40)	55
Netherlands (Single Top 100)	42
New Zealand (RIANZ)	4
Switzerland (Schweizer Hitparade)	10
UK Singles (OCC)	55
US Billboard Hot 100	44
US 12-inch Singles Sales (Billboard)	44
US Dance Club Play (Billboard)	47
US Hot Black Singles (Billboard)	47
US Cash Box Top 100	34
West Germany (Media Control)	49

== Certifications ==
Certifications and sales for "Batdance"
Region	Certification	Certified units/sales
Australia (ARIA)	Gold	35,000^{^}
United Kingdom (BPI)	Silver	200,000^{^}
United States (RIAA)	Platinum	1,000,000^{^}
^{^} Shipments figures based on certification alone.

== References in popular media ==
- Hot Chip's video for their 2008 song "Ready for the Floor" is a homage to Prince's "Batdance" video. The group's founder, Joe Goddard, explained: "'Batdance' was the first video I ever saw. [Prince's Batman music videos] had good visual ideas". This was Hot Chip's second tribute to Prince; in 2003 the band released an EP titled Down with Prince.
- Sir Mix-a-Lot sampled the "Vicki Vale" part of "Batdance" for the song "Beepers", from his 1989 album Seminar.
- Comedy Bang Bang host Scott Aukerman has said that "Batdance" is his favorite song, on multiple occasions.
- The song was used for a dance/fight sequence in Mukul S. Anand's 1991 film Hum.
- The song was referenced in Chuck's pilot episode.
- The B-side remix of "Batdance" (200 Balloons) is a stand name in JoJo's Bizzare Adventure part 9: The JOJOLands.

== Sources ==
- Uptown: The Vault – The Definitive Guide to the Musical World of Prince: Nilsen Publishing 2004, ISBN 91-631-5482-X
