= Scandalous! =

1989 single by Prince

- US 7-inch single

Single by Prince

from the album Batman
- B-side: "When 2 R in Love"; "Sex" (12")
- Released: November 28, 1989
- Recorded: October 17, 1988
- Studio: Paisley Park, Chanhassen
- Length: 7-inch edit: 4:12; Album: 6:15; Long version: 19:15
- Label: Warner Bros.
- Songwriters: Prince; John L. Nelson
- Producer: Prince

Prince singles chronology
"The Arms of Orion" (1989)	"Scandalous!" (1989)	"The Future" (1990)

Music video
- "Scandalous" on YouTube

"Scandalous" (modified to "Scandalous!" for single release) is the eighth track on Prince's soundtrack album Batman and was released as the album's fourth single, five months after the album was released. The music is attributed to Prince and his father, John L. Nelson. A maxi single was released after the single titled The Scandalous Sex Suite, which contained a three-part 19-minute suite of the song "Scandalous", with the three parts named The Crime, The Passion, and The Rapture. Kim Basinger, who was dating Prince at the time and who also played the character Vicki Vale in Batman, also appeared on the maxi single.

An edited version of the song plays over the end credits of the Batman film, following Danny Elfman's "Batman Theme Reprise." Elfman integrated portions of the melody of "Scandalous!" into his Batman score, most notably in the scene in which Vicki Vale confronts Bruce Wayne in the Batcave.

== Music video ==
The music video features Prince in a red sleeveless outfit doing tricks with the microphone. It ends with him leaving the microphone and holding his arms up.

== Critical reception ==
Music & Media wrote: "The slowest track from Batman is a good enough number but it is a long way from his best".

== Track listings ==
7-inch single (Scandalous!)

1. "Scandalous!" (edit) – 4:12
2. "When 2 R in Love" – 3:58

12-inch/CD single (The Scandalous Sex Suite)

1. "The Crime" – 6:25
2. "The Passion" – 6:20
3. "The Rapture" – 6:30
4. "Sex (The 80's Are Over and the Time Has Come 4 Monogamy and Trust)" – 6:56
5. "When 2 R in Love" – 3:58
6. "Partyman" (The Purple Party Mix) – 6:02 (Japan EP bonus track)
7. "Partyman" (Partyman Music Mix Remix) – 4:31 (Japan EP bonus track)
8. "Partyman" (The Video Mix) – 6:20 (Japan EP bonus track)
9. "Feel U Up" (Short Stroke) – 3:42 (Japan EP bonus track)

== Personnel ==
Credits from Benoît Clerc and Guitarcloud

- Prince – lead and backing vocals, Roland D-50, LinnDrum; electric guitars (extended version), bass (extended version)
- Kim Basinger - vocals (extended version)
- Eric Leeds - saxophone (extended version)

== Charts ==
Weekly chart performance for "Scandalous!"
Chart (1989–1990)	Peak position
Australia (ARIA)	95
Austria (Ö3 Austria Top 40)	17
Belgium (Ultratop 50 Flanders)	45
Italy Airplay (Music & Media)	1
Netherlands (Single Top 100)	21
US Hot R&B/Hip-Hop Songs (Billboard)	5
