= Dynacord Add-One =

Electronic musical instrument

ADD-One
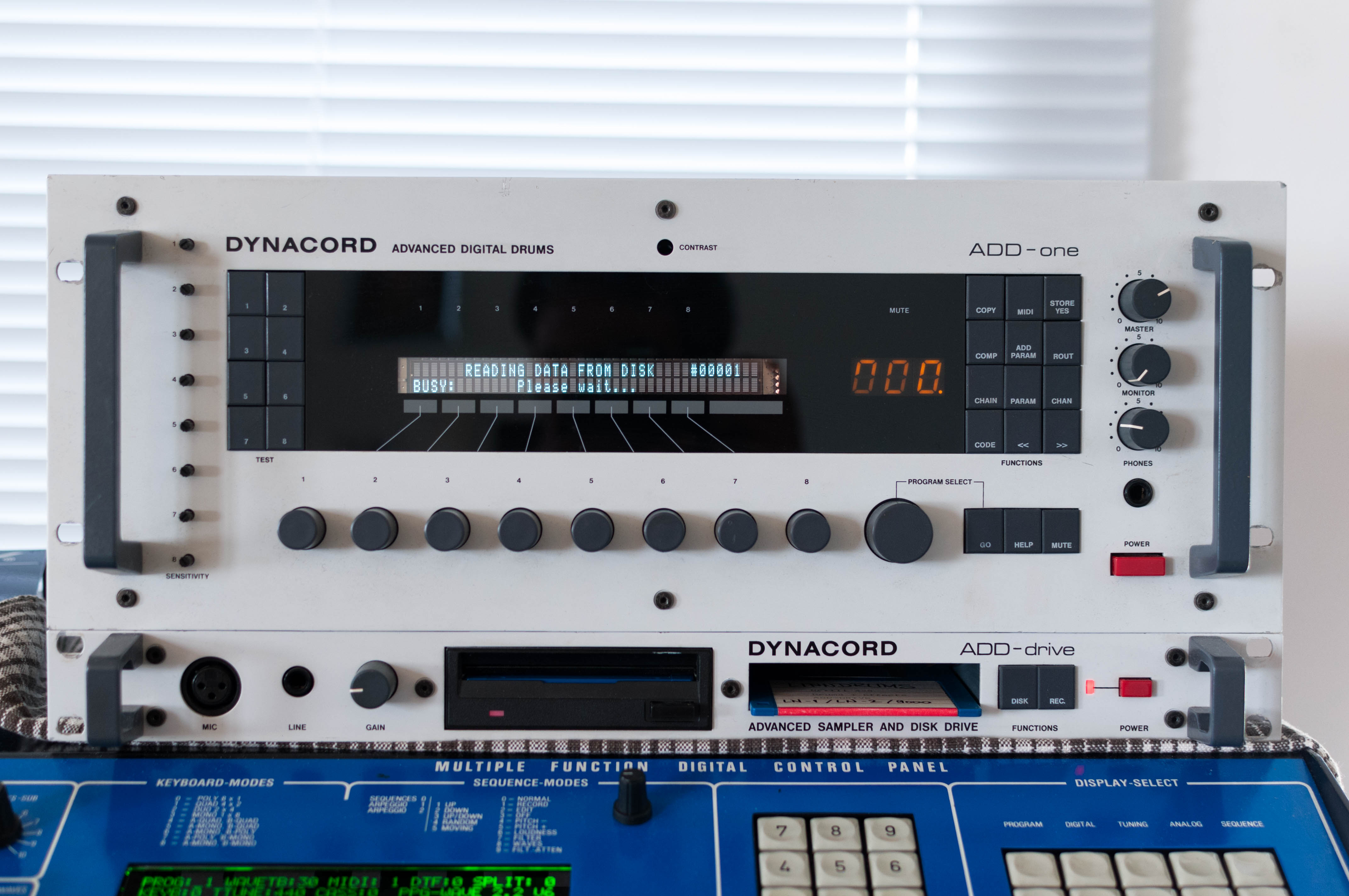
- Add-One with Add-Drive
- Manufacturer: Dynacord/Fast Forward Designs
- Dates: 1985-1987
- Price: £3000

Technical specifications
- Polyphony: 8 Voice, 8 Dacs
- Timbrality: 8 Part
- Oscillator: 1 Oscillator/Sample per voice
- LFO: LFOs triangle saw square sample and hold
- Synthesis type: Samples
- Filter: 8x Low pass resonant (self-resonating) Analog CEM 3389 filter per voice
- Storage memory: 1Mbytes upgradable to 8Mbytes

Input/output
- External control: MIDI, CV, Pads

The Dynacord ADD-One (advanced digital drums) is a German-manufactured, American-designed drum machine that was first released in 1986. It uses recorded samples to produce its sounds through analog voltage-controlled envelopes and analog filters with resonance, to self-oscillation per voice. It comes with 1 Mbyte of memory and can be upgraded up to 8 Mbytes.

== Sample rate and bit rate ==
The unit can sample up to 50 kHz at 12-bits for up to 20 seconds. Actually it is 8 bits with 4 bits of companding according to one of the designers Michael Doidic. The sample rate and therefore the pitch is variable, like the Fairlight and E-mu EII and other earlier samples, via the 8 separate DACs - variable pitch via sample clock rate change. Later digital samplers, including those that operate in software utilise interpolation and other techniques to alter the pitch of a sample - the effect, particularly in the low-end is not the same.

== Display ==
The unit features an 80-character backlit LCD.

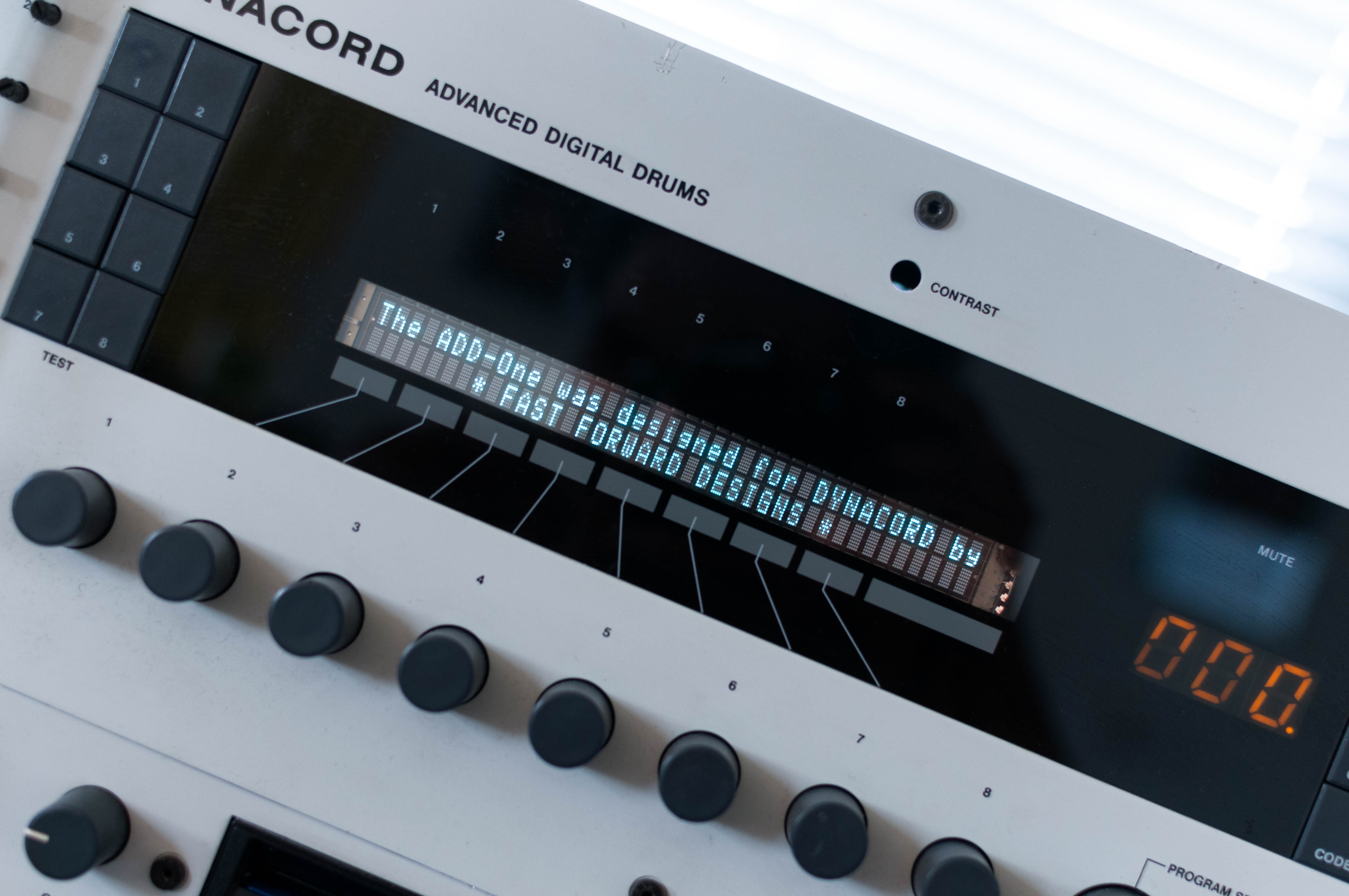
Credits page on the Add-One

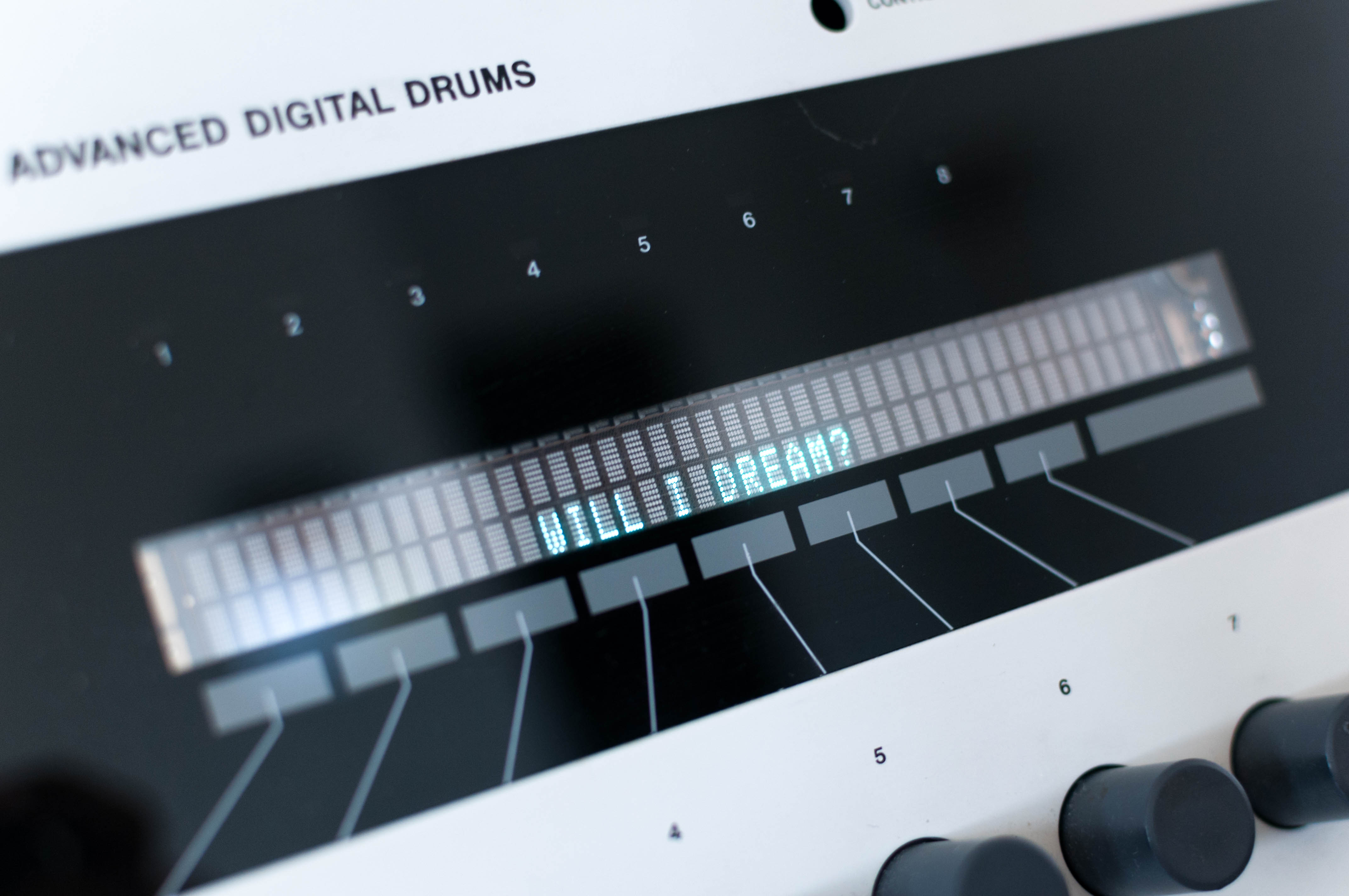
Easter Egg

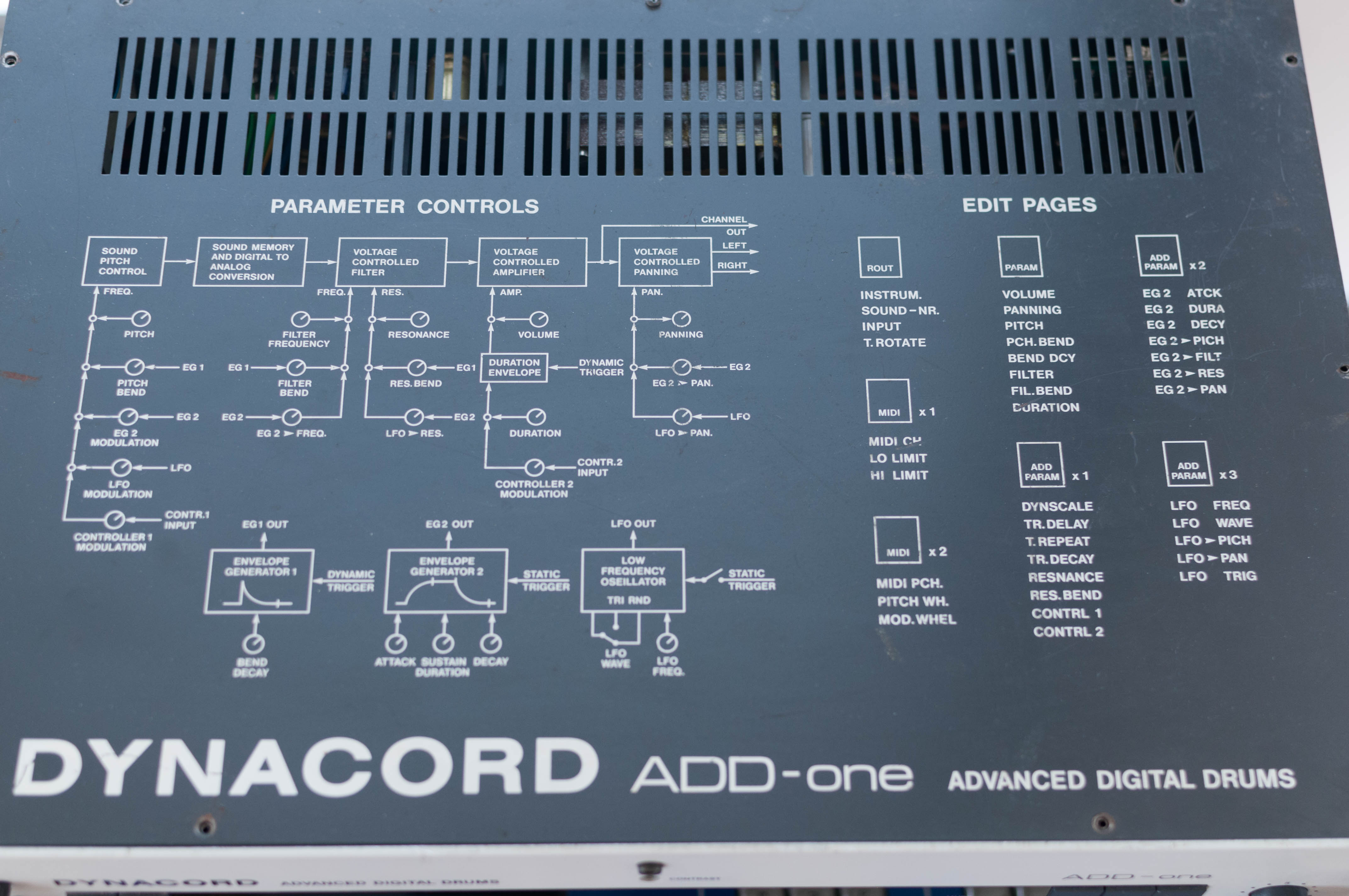
Legending on the top of the unit

== Sounds ==
Bass drums, congas, snares, Hihats as well as single-cycle waveforms (sine/triangle etc.) contained on EPROMS. With the optional 'Add-One Drive' one can sample any recorded sounds into the sampler via the microphone/line input with on-board compressor.

== External control ==
The Chain mode allows these to be called up in any order and stepped through by a footswitch. The unit also features MIDI which allows it to be controlled from an external device such as a synthesizer or electronic drums.

== Notable users ==
- Jeff Porcaro who appeared on the printed marketing material promoting the ADD-One
- Jean-Michel Jarre
- Prince
