= Satoko Miyahara =

Japanese figure skater

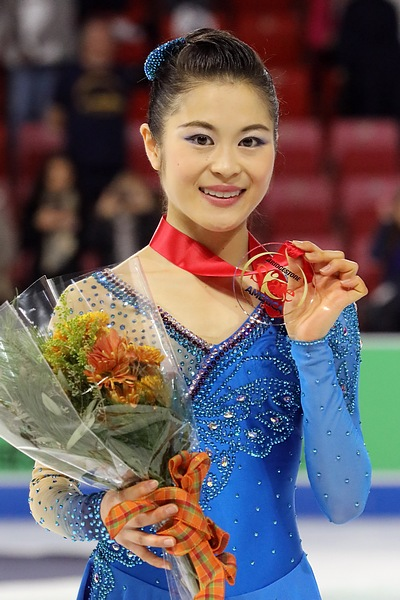
- Miyahara at the 2017 Skate America

Personal information
- Native name: 宮原 知子
- Born: March 26, 1998 (age 28) Kyoto, Japan
- Home town: Kyoto, Japan
- Height: 152 cm (5 ft 0 in)

Figure skating career
- Country: Japan
- Skating club: Kansai University SC; Kinoshita Group
- Began skating: 2002
- Retired: March 26, 2022
Event	Gold medal – first place	Silver medal – second place	Bronze medal – third place
World Championships	0	1	1
Four Continents Championships	1	2	1
Grand Prix Final	0	2	0
Japan Championships	4	0	3
World Team Trophy	0	0	1
Medal list
World Championships
Silver medal – second place	2015 Shanghai	Singles
Bronze medal – third place	2018 Milan	Singles
Four Continents Championships
Gold medal – first place	2016 Taipei	Singles
Silver medal – second place	2014 Taipei	Singles
Silver medal – second place	2015 Seoul	Singles
Bronze medal – third place	2018 Taipei	Singles
Grand Prix Final
Silver medal – second place	2015–16 Barcelona	Singles
Silver medal – second place	2016–17 Marseille	Singles
Japan Championships
Gold medal – first place	2014–15 Nagano	Singles
Gold medal – first place	2015–16 Sapporo	Singles
Gold medal – first place	2016–17 Osaka	Singles
Gold medal – first place	2017–18 Tokyo	Singles
Bronze medal – third place	2012–13 Sapporo	Singles
Bronze medal – third place	2018–19 Osaka	Singles
Bronze medal – third place	2020–21 Nagano	Singles
World Team Trophy
Bronze medal – third place	2015 Tokyo	Team

Satoko Miyahara (宮原 知子, Miyahara Satoko; born March 26, 1998) is a Japanese retired figure skater. She is the 2015 World silver medalist, the 2018 World bronze medalist, the 2016 Four Continents champion, a two-time Four Continents silver medalist (2014, 2015), a two-time Grand Prix Final silver medalist (2015, 2016), a two-time Skate America champion (2017, 2018), the 2015 NHK Trophy champion, a four-time CS U.S. Classic champion (2015, 2016, 2018, 2019), the 2014 CS Lombardia Trophy champion, and a four-time Japanese national champion (2014–17).

On the junior level, she is the 2012 JGP U.S. champion, the 2011 JGP Poland silver medalist, the 2012 Asian Figure Skating Trophy champion, and a two-time Japanese junior national champion (2012, 2013).

She placed fourth at the 2018 Winter Olympics.

== Personal life ==
Miyahara was born on March 26, 1998, in Kyoto, Japan. Her parents are both doctors. She moved with her family to Houston, Texas, when she was four years old, as her parents were doing research at the University of Texas, and had returned to Kyoto by the age of seven.

Miyahara began to learn English during her time in the United States, although she was reluctant to speak it at school, and she did not become fully fluent before returning to Japan. She would later describe English as a focal point in her life along with figure skating, and she made further efforts to improve her English by attending English lessons in Japan and speaking to skaters from other countries.

In February 2016, Miyahara graduated from Kansai University High School. She graduated from Kansai University in the spring of 2021, having studied in the Faculty of Literature and majoring in British and American Literature and English.

Standing five feet tall, she is known to her fan base as the "Tiny Queen". Miyahara said that she likes the nickname as "I tend to shrink and feel like I am not good enough. 'Tiny Queen' brings the feeling that I should be proud of myself and show my best."

In August 2023, Miyahara reflected on her retirement and the "deep friendship" she established with Stéphane Lambiel's team in Champéry, Switzerland.

== Career ==
Miyahara began skating while she was living in the United States at age four, and she came under the guidance of Mie Hamada in Kyoto, Japan at the age of seven.

=== 2011–2012 season: Junior international debut ===
Miyahara became eligible for junior international competition in the 2011–2012 season. She won a silver medal at her Junior Grand Prix debut in Gdańsk, Poland, and finished fifth at her second event in Milan, Italy. Miyahara then won the Japan junior title and placed sixth on the senior level. She was fourth at her first World Junior Championships. Miyahara was invited to skate in the gala at the 2012 World Team Trophy as the Japanese junior national champion.

=== 2012–2013 season: First senior national podium ===
In the 2012–2013 season, Miyahara won gold and bronze medals at her JGP events in the United States and Turkey, respectively. Miyahara then won the 2012 Japanese Junior Championships, before placing fifth at the JGP Final in Sochi, Russia.

Miyahara won her first senior national medal, a bronze, at the Japanese Championships, finishing ahead of Akiko Suzuki. She ended her season at the 2013 World Junior Championships where she finished seventh.

=== 2013–2014 season: Senior international debut ===
Miyahara started the 2013–2014 season by winning the Asian Trophy. Debuting on the senior Grand Prix, she finished fifth at the 2013 NHK Trophy, having placed sixth in the short program and fifth in the free skate. At the 2013 Rostelecom Cup, she was sixth in the short program, sixth in the free skate, and fifth overall.

At the Japanese Championships, Miyahara placed fourth in the short, fifth in the free, and fourth overall, behind Akiko Suzuki, Kanako Murakami, and Mao Asada. She was selected to compete at the 2014 Four Continents Championships, where she won the silver medal behind teammate Kanako Murakami after placing fourth in the short and second in the free.

Miyahara finished fourth at the 2014 World Junior Championships — less than a point out of third. She ended her season with a gold medal at the Gardena Spring Trophy.

=== 2014–2015 season: World silver medalist ===
Miyahara attended a training camp during the summer of 2014 to work with Olympic champion Ilia Kulik on her jumps. She opened the 2014–2015 season with a win at the Lombardia Trophy. Competing in the Grand Prix series, she took bronze at the 2014 Skate Canada International after placing fourth in the short program and third in the free skate. She won another bronze medal at 2014 NHK Trophy (fourth in SP, second in FS). With these results, Miyahara was the second alternate for the Grand Prix Final.

At the Japanese Championships, Miyahara placed second in the short and first in the free on her way to her first senior national title. At the 2015 Four Continents Championships, she won silver for the second year in a row, having won the short program and placed second in the free.

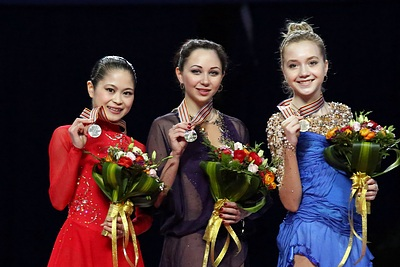
Miyahara (left) with Elizaveta Tuktamysheva (center) and Elena Radionova (right) at the 2015 World Championships podium

Miyahara ranked third in the short, fourth in the free skate, and second overall at the 2015 World Championships, with personal bests in all competition segments. She was awarded the silver medal behind Elizaveta Tuktamysheva. At the 2015 World Team Trophy, she placed fifth individually and third as part of team Japan.

=== 2015–2016 season: Four Continents champion and Grand Prix Final silver ===
In the summer of 2015, Miyahara traveled to southern California to work with Ilia Kulik for the second year in a row, aiming to add more power to her jumps. She opened her season on the Challenger Series, winning the 2015 U.S. Classic. Turning to the Grand Prix series, she took bronze at the 2015 Skate America before winning gold at the 2015 NHK Trophy, defeating three-time World Champion Mao Asada. These results qualified Miyahara for her first senior Grand Prix Final.

She won the silver medal at the event in Barcelona after placing fourth in the short program and second in the free skate with personal bests in the free skate and combined total.

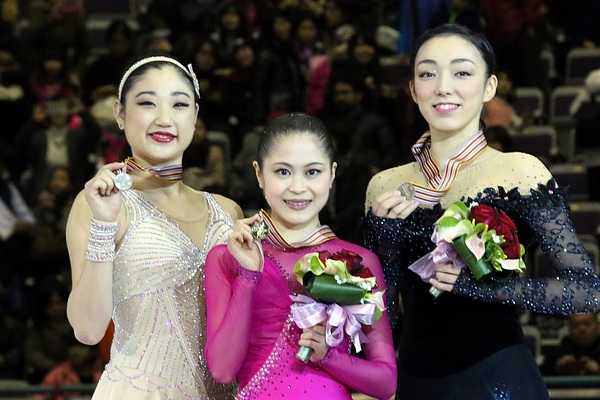
Miyahara (center) with Mirai Nagasu (left) and Rika Hongo (right) at the 2016 Four Continents Championships podium

After repeating as the Japanese national champion, Miyahara went on to win gold at the 2016 Four Continents, achieving personal bests in every portion of the competition. She finished fifth at the 2016 World Championships in Boston, the only event of the season where she finished off the podium.

=== 2016–2017 season: Second Grand Prix Final silver ===
Miyahara opened her season with a gold medal at the 2016 CS U.S. Classic. Turning to the Grand Prix series, she won the bronze medal at the 2016 Skate Canada International, behind Evgenia Medvedeva and Kaetlyn Osmond, and then silver at the 2016 NHK Trophy, behind Anna Pogorilaya.

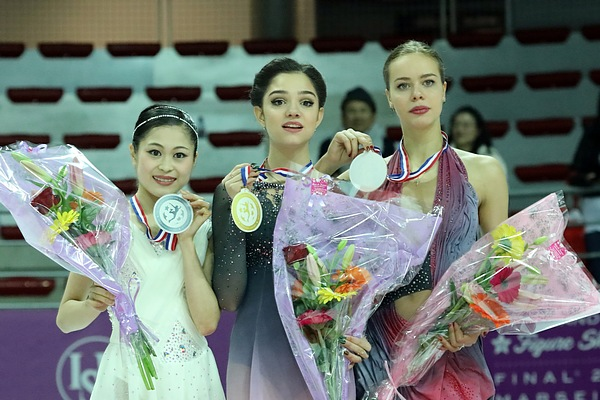
Miyahara (left) with Evgenia Medvedeva (center) and Anna Pogorilaya (right) at the 2016–17 Grand Prix Final podium

In December, she was awarded the silver medal at the Grand Prix Final in Marseille, being outscored only by Medvedeva. Later that month, she defeated Wakaba Higuchi and Mai Mihara at the Japan Championships to win her third national title.

Due to a stress fracture in her left pelvic girdle, Miyahara withdrew from two February competitions, the 2017 Four Continents Championships and the 2017 Asian Winter Games. To focus on recovery she also decided to withdraw from the 2017 World Championships. The hip injury was attributed to low bone density.

Miyahara underwent rehabilitation for her injury at the Japan Institute of Sports Science in Tokyo. She credited her time at the rehabilitation center, where she frequently spoke with athletes from other sports, with improving her communication skills. She also said that she had previously engaged in disordered eating behavior to keep herself to a set weight, but that she learned the weight she had set for herself was insufficient, which had to led to her hip fracture. Miyahara returned to training in May.

=== 2017–2018 season: Olympic season ===
Miyahara injured her left foot in July and was diagnosed with inflammation in her right hip in September. She resumed jumping in October. At the 2017 NHK Trophy she finished 5th after underrotating jumps in both nights, but rallied three weeks later to win gold at the 2017 Skate America. She was the first alternate for the 2017-2018 Grand Prix Final in Nagoya, but got promoted and competed in the Final after 2016 champion Evgenia Medvedeva withdrew due to injury. At the Grand Prix Final, she finished third in the short program and fourth in the free skate, finishing fifth overall after lower ranked skaters in the short program performed stronger free skates. Miyahara, while competing well, underrotated two of her jumps in the free skate, also contributing to a lower result.

At the 2017 Japan Championships, Miyahara was crowned the national champion for the fourth time after placing second in the short program and first in the free skate. On December 24, 2017, she was selected to represent Japan at the 2018 Four Continents Championships in Taipei, the 2018 Winter Olympics in Pyeongchang, South Korea, and 2018 World Championships in Milan, Italy.

In Taipei, Miyahara was first after the short program, third after the free and won the bronze medal overall, behind teammates Kaori Sakamoto and Mai Mihara, contributing to a Japanese sweep of the podium.

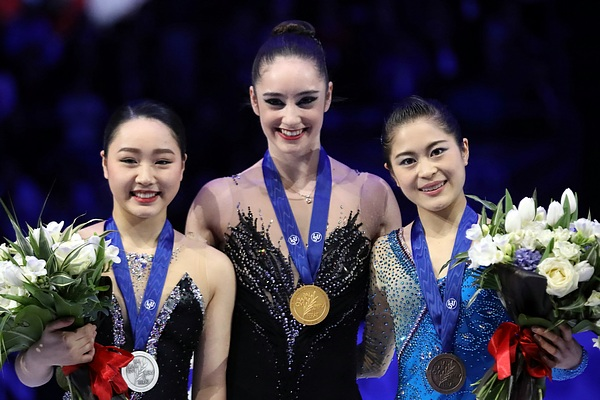
Miyahara (right) with Wakaba Higuchi (left) and Kaetlyn Osmond (center) at the 2018 World Championships podium

At the Olympics, Miyahara was assigned to participate in the ladies' short program in the Team Event, with her teammate Kaori Sakamoto chosen to compete in the free skating. She scored 68.95 points, which was the fourth result that night. Team Japan finished fifth overall. In the individual event, Miyahara scored new personal bests with clean performances, placing fourth in both segments of the competition and overall.

At the World Championships, Miyahara was in third after the short program, with a score of 74.36 after underrotating a triple toe loop in her jump combination. In the free skating, she placed third again with a score of 135.72 after making several mistakes on her jumps. She took bronze overall, behind Kaetlyn Osmond (gold) and teammate Wakaba Higuchi (silver).

=== 2018–2019 season ===
Miyahara's short program for this season was set to "Song for the Little Sparrow". Choreographer Lori Nichol used the piece to highlight Miyahara's ability to generate high speed without visible effort.

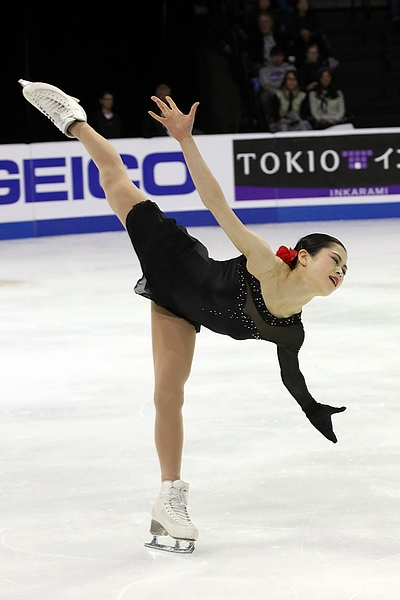
Miyahara performing a spiral in her free program at 2018 Skate America

In preparation for the season, Miyahara worked with a new strength trainer and focused especially on strengthening her hamstrings. Competing first at the 2018 U.S. Classic, she won gold. She went on to win the 2018 Skate America event, placing first in both segments. At her second Grand Prix event, the 2018 NHK Trophy, Miyahara placed second in both programs, narrowly winning the silver medal ahead of Elizaveta Tuktamysheva and behind compatriot Rika Kihira. In the short program, she set a new personal best. She received two underrotation calls in the free skate, and remarked "I was very nervous in my long program. I am disappointed, but I know that I will try harder, so I do better in the future." Her results qualified her for the 2018–19 Grand Prix Final, where she finished sixth, following a combination error in the short program and several underrotated jumps in the free skate. Miyahara deemed it a "frustrating competition", but "I think it will be helpful for the future."

At the 2018 Japan Championships, Miyahara won the short program, slightly more than a point ahead of Sakamoto. Several errors lead to her placing fourth in the free skate, dropping to the bronze medal position overall behind Sakamoto and Kihira. She was named to the Japanese team for the 2019 World Championships in Saitama. Miyahara placed eighth in the short program at the World Championships, after underrotating the second part of her jump combination. She rose to sixth place in the free skate after making only one minor error. Miyahara deemed the season as a whole "mentally one of the toughest seasons", and felt she "had more disappointing competitions over good ones", but that the final event was a strong one.

=== 2019–2020 season ===
On September 18, 2019, Miyahara's representatives announced that she had moved her primary training base to the Granite Club in Toronto, and was adding Lee Barkell as a coach, though she would continue to be coached by Mie Hamada as well. Miyahara stated that her main goal was to perform a triple Axel in competition. She would later say "to grow up, I chose to go to Toronto."

Miyahara's free program used a medley of music, including the theme from Schindler's List; she chose the music herself after seeing pianist John Bayless perform it and being deeply touched. Choreographer Lori Nichol said the goal of the program was to "express her sorrow for the atrocities and inspire human compassion".

She began her season at 2019 Japan Open, where she placed fourth with a score of 134.94 points, contributing to Team Japan's silver medal. At 2019 U.S. Classic, she placed first in the short program with 74.16 points and second in the free skate with 130.14 points, once again winning the gold medal at the event.

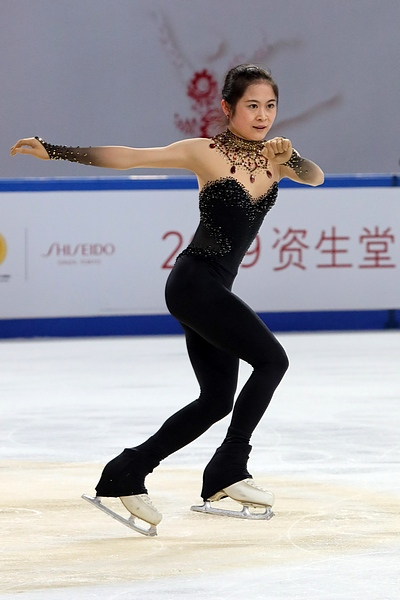
Miyahara performing her short program at the 2019 Cup of China

At her first Grand Prix event, the 2019 Cup of China, she placed second in the short program despite two underrotations. She was third in the free skate, with three jump underrotations, but remained in second place overall, taking the silver medal. Competing the following week at the 2019 Rostelecom Cup, Miyahara placed sixth in the short program after doubling a planned triple Lutz and managing only a triple-double jump combination. She moved from sixth to fourth place in the free skate despite five of her jumps being called underrotated.

Miyahara placed second in the short program at the 2019–20 Japanese Championships after underrotating the second part of her jump combination. She was sixth in the free skate after falling once and underrotating or downgrading eight jumps, and dropped to fourth place overall, her first time finishing off the podium at her national championships since 2013. Disappointed, she commented "I was really good at practice, but I could not control myself tonight, especially in the second half." Despite her nationals finish, Miyahara was assigned to compete at the World Championships in Montreal rather than national bronze medalist Tomoe Kawabata, but the World Championships were cancelled as a result of the coronavirus pandemic.

=== 2020–2021 season ===
Miyahara was given a bye to the Japan Championships due to the COVID-19 pandemic making it impractical for her to travel back from her training location in Canada for lesser domestic events. In October, Mie Hamada was removed as one of her coaches on her ISU bio, which listed Lee Barkell as her sole coach. Miyahara was assigned to compete at the 2020 Skate Canada International, but this event was also cancelled as a result of the pandemic.

In December, Miyahara returned to Japan to compete at the 2020–21 Japan Championships. She placed sixth in the short program after performing only an invalid double loop as her solo jump instead of a planned triple. Third in the free skate, she rose to the bronze medal position. She was assigned to compete at the 2021 World Championships in Stockholm. Miyahara suffered a right foot injury later in December that kept her off the ice for some time. She struggled at the World Championships, placing nineteenth, the first time she had placed outside the top six. In her assessment, "in terms of technique, it wasn't a performance worth talking about."

=== 2021–2022 season: Retirement ===
Miyahara withdrew from the 2021 CS Autumn Classic International, and thus did not participate in a Challenger event prior to the beginning of the Grand Prix. Competing at the 2021 Skate America, Miyahara placed seventh. Her second Grand Prix was initially the 2021 Cup of China, but following its cancellation she was reassigned to the 2021 Gran Premio d'Italia in Turin. She placed fifth at the event, despite a number of underrotations, and said afterward "there were some issues with some things, but at least I landed all jumps today. I think it's a pretty big step from the last two seasons and I think I was in control of myself better."

At the 2021–22 Japan Championships, Miyahara placed fourth in the short program. She was sixth in the free skate after underrotating several jumps and finished fifth overall. She was named as an alternate for the Japanese Olympic team and assigned to compete at the 2022 Four Continents Championships. Miyahara subsequently withdrew from Four Continents due to illness and was replaced by Yuhana Yokoi.

On March 26, Miyahara announced that she was retiring from competitive skating, saying that she had "no regrets. And, I have a lot of dreams for my next step."

== Post-competitive career ==
Following the end of her competitive career, Miyahara has toured with Stars on Ice in Canada and the United States as well as in Japan; she has said that she specifically wanted to perform in overseas shows.

She has also choreographed programs for other skaters, including exhibition programs for Kaori Sakamoto and Miyabi Oba. In September 2024, she became a director at the Japan Skating Federation.

== Skating technique ==
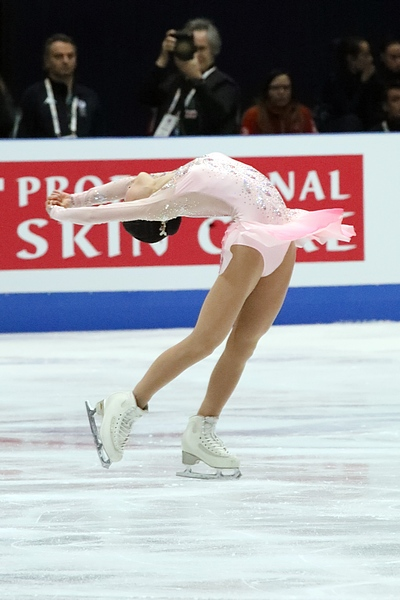
Miyahara performing a layback spin

Miyahara initially learned to jump and spin clockwise; most skaters jump and spin counter-clockwise. After she returned to Japan, her coach had her try jumping counter-clockwise and thought that she should switch to that direction. Her jump axis was unstable when jumping clockwise, and she had developed habits that required her to use more force than necessary, so her coach thought it was better to have her start over in the counter-clockwise direction. Miyahara can still perform double jumps in a clockwise direction. Commentators have noted that her jumps are small.

Miyahara has been praised for the speed and quality of her spins, which she can perform in both directions.

== Programs ==
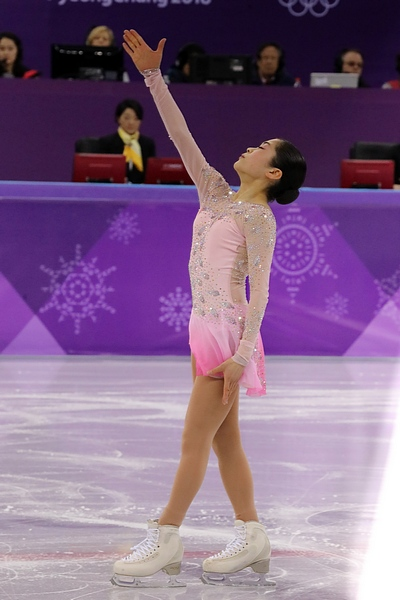
Olympic Games

Post-Competitive Career Programs

Season	Exhibition
2025–2026	Lilies of the Valley (from Pina) by Jun Miyake, choreo. by Kenta Kojiri; I'd Rather Go Blind by Etta James, performed by Dua Lipa; Dance the Night (from Barbie) by Dua Lipa, choreo. by Stéphane Lambiel; Ne me quitte pas performed by Jacques Brel & Maysa; Is Paris Burning (Piano Solo Version) by Takashi Kako, choreo. by Stéphane Lambiel
2024–2025	It's About That Walk by Prince; Minor Blue by David Darling, choreo. by Satoko Miyahara; One Last Dance by Alexandra Stréliski, choreo. by Satoko Miyahara; Voilà by Barbara Pravi, choreo. by Jeffrey Buttle
2023–2024	Solo pa' bailarla / Vientos Del Alma by Mercedes Sosa, choreo. by Mihoko Higuchi; Paternera by Gino D'Auri, choreo. by Stéphane Lambiel; It's About That Walk by Prince
2022–2023	Paternera by Gino D'Auri, choreo. by Stéphane Lambiel; Overture/Sun And Moon from Miss Saigon, choreo. by Stéphane Lambiel and Satoko Miyahara; Winter from The Four Seasons by Antonio Vivaldi, choreo. by Satoko Miyahara; Perhaps, Perhaps, Perhaps performed by Doris Day, Mambo No. 8 choreo. by Satoko Miyahara; Stone Cold by Demi Lovato, performed by ELLE, choreo. by Satoko Miyahara; Gnosienne No. 1 by Erik Satie, Metamorphosis II by Philip Glass, choreo. by Stéphane Lambiel; Stabat Mater by Giovanni Battista Pergolesi, performed by June Anderson & Cecilia Bartoli, choreo. by Kenta Kojiri and Satoko Miyahara; Jenny of Oldstones by Florence + the Machine, Let's Play A Game from Game of Thrones by Ramin Djawadi, choreo. by Stéphane Lambiel; Ne me quitte pas by Jacques Brel, choreo. by Shae-Lynn Bourne
2021—2022	Stabat Mater by Giovanni Battista Pergolesi, performed by June Anderson & Cecilia Bartoli, choreo. by Kenta Kojiri and Satoko Miyahara; Voilà by Barbara Pravi, choreo. by Jeffrey Buttle; Libertango by Astor Piazzolla, performed by NAOTO, choreo. by Jeffrey Buttle

Competitive Career Programs

Season	Short program	Free skating	Exhibition
2021–2022	Song for the Little Sparrow by Abel Korzeniowski performed by Patricia Kaas choreo. by Lori Nichol	Tosca by Giacomo Puccini choreo. by Lori Nichol	Lyra Angelica by William Alwyn choreo. by Jeffrey Buttle
2020–2021	Gnossienne No. 1 by Erik Satie; Metamorphosis II by Philip Glass choreo. by Stephane Lambiel	Tosca by Giacomo Puccini choreo. by Lori Nichol	Yalla by ZwiReK; Tabla & Percussion Solo performed by Bashir Abdel Aal; Egyptian Disco (Buddha Bar edit) by David Visan choreo. by Benoit Richaud
2019–2020	Yalla by ZwiReK; Tabla & Percussion Solo performed by Bashir Abdel Aal; Egyptian Disco (Buddha Bar edit) by David Visan choreo. by Benoit Richaud	Theme from Schindler's List (from Schindler's List) by John Williams; Prelude in C-sharp minor by Sergei Rachmaninoff; Hatikvah (Interlude) by Samuel Cohen choreo. by Lori Nichol	Gnossienne No. 1 by Erik Satie; Metamorphosis II by Philip Glass choreo. by Stephane Lambiel
2018–2019	Song for the Little Sparrow by Abel Korzeniowski performed by Patricia Kaas choreo. by Lori Nichol	Invierno Porteno by Astor Piazzolla choreo. by Tom Dickson	Bella Donna Twist (Kurios, Cirque du Soleil) choreo. by Stephane Lambiel
2017–2018	Sayuri's Theme (from Memoirs of a Geisha) by John Williams choreo. by Lori Nichol	Madama Butterfly by Giacomo Puccini choreo. by Tom Dickson; Act 3; Goro's Entrance (Act 2); Butterfly Bids Her Child Farewell (Act 2); Prelude	Madama Butterfly by Giacomo Puccini choreo. by Tom Dickson; Concierto de Aranjuez by Joaquín Rodrigo
2016–2017	Musetta's Waltz (from La bohème) by Giacomo Puccini choreo. by Lori Nichol	Venus (from The Planets) by Gustav Holst; Mars (from The Planets); Princess Leia's Theme (from Star Wars) by John Williams; Jupiter (from The Planets) choreo. by Tom Dickson	One More Try by George Michael performed by Brenna Whitaker choreo. by Jeffrey Buttle; Hernando's Hideaway by Jerry Ross, Richard Adler performed by Ella Fitzgerald choreo. by Stéphane Lambiel
2015–2016	Firedance (from Riverdance) by Bill Whelan choreo. by Tom Dickson	Un Sospiro by Franz Liszt choreo. by Lori Nichol	Tsubasa o Kudasai performed by Hayley Westenra choreo. by Stéphane Lambiel; Pennies from Heaven performed by Rose Murphy choreo. by Jeffrey Buttle
2014–2015	The Magic Flute by Wolfgang Amadeus Mozart choreo. by Lori Nichol	Miss Saigon by Claude-Michel Schönberg choreo. by Tom Dickson	The Man I Love performed by Kate Bush, Larry Adler; Sing, Sing, Sing (with a Swing) by Benny Goodman performed by Electro Swing Invasion; Let Her Go performed by Jasmine Thompson choreo. by Stéphane Lambiel
2013–2014	Merry Christmas, Mr. Lawrence by Ryuichi Sakamoto	Poeta by Vicente Amigo	Solace by Vanessa-Mae
2012–2013	The Swan by Camille Saint-Saëns; Voice of Spring Waltz by Johann Strauss II	Romeo and Juliet by Nino Rota; Adagio in G minor by Remo Giazotto	Papa Loves Mambo by Perry Como; Voice of Spring Waltz by Johann Strauss II
2011–2012	Por una cabeza (from Scent of a Woman) by Thomas Newman	Mother Goose Suite by Maurice Ravel	Sympathique by Pink Martini

== Competitive highlights ==
- GP – Event of the ISU Grand Prix Series
- JGP – Event of the ISU Junior Grand Prix Series
- CS – Event of the ISU Challenger Series
- C – Cancelled event
- WD – Withdrew from event
- Medals at team events are awarded for the team results only. Individual placements at team events are listed in parentheses.

Competition placements at senior level
Season	2011–12	2012–13	2013–14	2014-15	2015-16	2016-17	2017-18	2018-19	2019-20	2020-21	2021-22	2023-24
Winter Olympics							4th					
Winter Olympics (Team Event)							5th					
World Championships				2nd	5th	WD	3rd	6th	C	19th		
Four Continents Championships			2nd	2nd	1st	WD	3rd				WD	
Grand Prix Final					2nd	2nd	5th	6th				
Japan Championships	6th	3rd	4th	1st	1st	1st	1st	3rd	4th	3rd	5th	
World Team Trophy				3rd (5th)								
GP Cup of China									2nd		C	
GP Italy											5th	
GP NHK Trophy			5th	3rd	1st	2nd	5th	2nd				
GP Rostelecom Cup			5th						4th			
GP Skate America					3rd		1st	1st			7th	
GP Skate Canada				3rd		3rd				C		
CS Lombardia Trophy				1st								
CS U.S. Classic					1st	1st		1st	1st			
Asian Open			1st									
Bavarian Open								1st	1st			
Egna Spring Trophy			1st									
Team Challenge Cup					3rd (2nd)							
Japan Open				3rd (2nd)	1st (2nd)	1st (2nd)		1st (3rd)	2nd (4th)		1st (6th)	1st (4th)

Competition placements at junior level
Season	2009–10	2010–11	2011–12	2012-13	2013-14
Junior World Championships			4th	7th	4th
Junior Grand Prix Final				5th	
Japanese Championships	4th	4th	1st	1st	
JGP Italy			5th		
JGP Poland			2nd		
JGP Turkey				3rd	
JGP United States				1st	
Asian Open				1st	

== Detailed results ==
=== Senior level ===
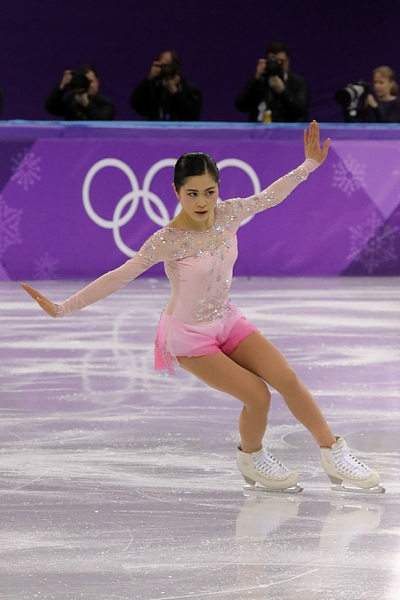
Miyahara at the 2018 Winter Olympics

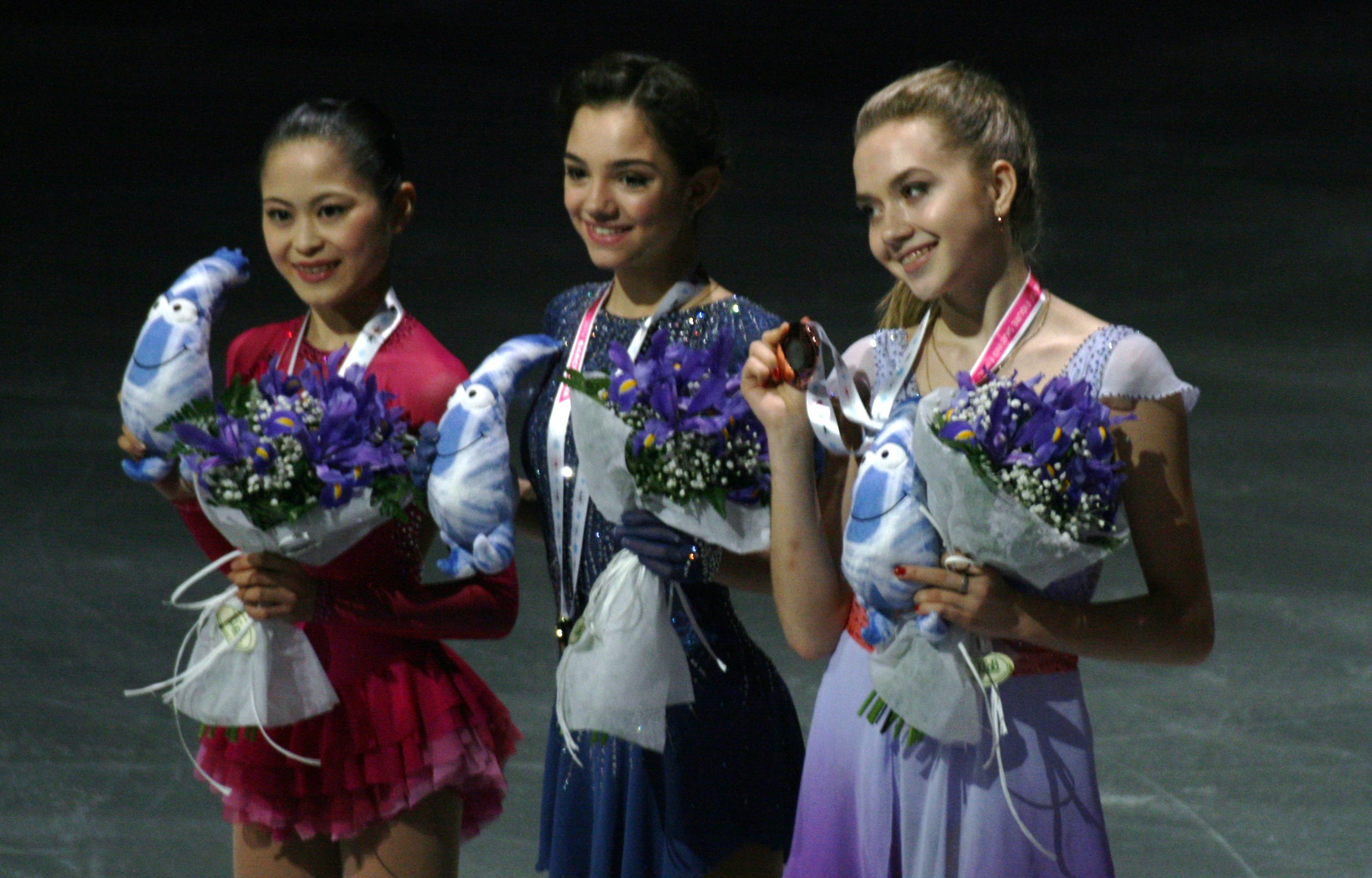
Miyahara at the 2015–16 Grand Prix Final podium

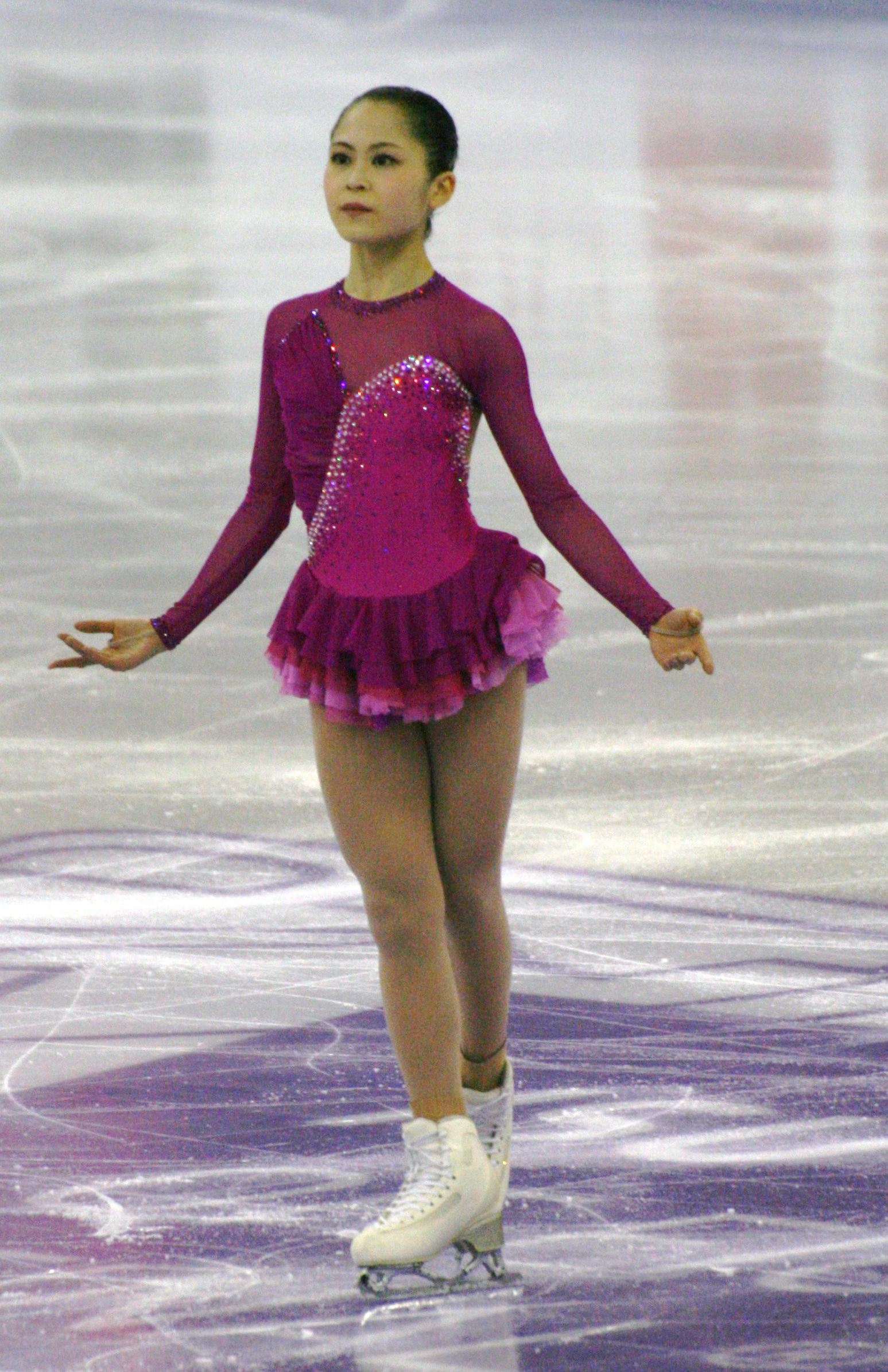
Miyahara at the 2015–16 Grand Prix Final

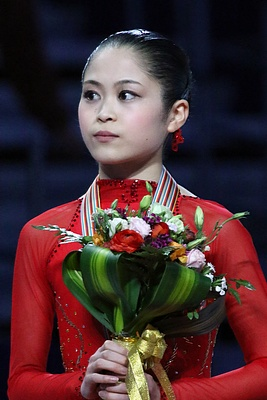
Miyahara at the 2015 World Championships podium

- Small medals for the short program and free skating are only awarded at ISU Championships.
- Medals at team events are awarded for the team results only. Individual placements at team events are listed in parentheses.
- ISU Personal Bests highlighted in **bold**.

Results in the 2013–14 season
Date	Event	SP		FS		Total	
Date	Event	P	Score	P	Score	P	Score
Aug 8 – 11, 2013	(Thailand) 2013 Asian Open Trophy	1	54.43	1	115.42	1	169.85
Nov 8 – 10, 2013	(Japan) 2013 NHK Trophy	5	58.39	5	111.82	5	170.01
Nov 22 – 24, 2013	(Russia) 2013 Rostelecom Cup	6	56.57	6	109.19	5	165.76
Dec 20 – 23, 2013	2013-14 Japan Championships	4	66.52	5	125.06	4	191.58
Jan 20 – 26, 2014	(Taiwan) 2014 Four Continents Championships	4	60.27	2	126.26	2	186.53
March 29 – 30, 2014	(Italy) 2014 Egna Spring Trophy	1	62.18	2	105.04	1	167.22

Results in the 2014–15 season
Date	Event	SP		FS		Total	
Date	Event	P	Score	P	Score	P	Score
Sep 18 – 21, 2014	(Italy) 2014 CS Lombardia Trophy	1	58.12	1	125.78	1	183.90
Oct 4, 2014	2014 Japan Open	—N/a	—N/a	2	131.94	3	—N/a
Nov 8 – 10, 2013	2014 Skate Canada International	4	60.22	3	121.53	3	181.75
Nov 28 – 30, 2014	(Japan) 2014 NHK Trophy	4	60.69	2	118.33	3	179.02
Dec 26 – 28, 2014	2014-15 Japan Championships	2	64.48	1	131.12	1	195.60
Feb 15 – 19, 2015	(South Korea) 2015 Four Continents Championships	1	64.84	2	116.75	2	181.59
Mar 23 – 29, 2015	(China) 2015 World Championships	3	67.02	4	126.58	2	193.60
Apr 16 – 29, 2015	(Japan) 2015 World Team Trophy	6	60.52	3	129.12	3 (5)	189.64

Results in the 2015–16 season
Date	Event	SP		FS		Total	
Date	Event	P	Score	P	Score	P	Score
Sep 16 – 20, 2015	(United States) 2015 CS U.S. Classic	1	63.48	1	120.16	1	183.64
Oct 3, 2015	2015 Japan Open	—N/a	—N/a	2	134.67	1	—N/a
Oct 23 – 25, 2015	(United States) 2015 Skate America	3	65.12	3	122.95	3	188.07
Nov 27 – 29, 2015	(Japan) 2015 NHK Trophy	1	69.53	1	133.58	1	203.11
Dec 10 – 13, 2015	(Spain) 2015-16 Grand Prix Final	4	68.76	2	140.09	2	208.85
Dec 24 – 27, 2015	2015-16 Japan Championships	1	73.24	1	139.59	1	212.83
Feb 16 – 21, 2016	(Taiwan) 2016 Four Continents Championships	1	72.48	1	142.43	1	214.91
Mar 28 – Apr 3, 2016	(United States) 2016 World Championships	6	70.72	3	139.89	5	210.61
Apr 22 – 24, 2016	(United States) 2016 Team Challenge Cup	1	73.28	2	145.02	3 (2)	218.30

Results in the 2016–17 season
Date	Event	SP		FS		Total	
Date	Event	P	Score	P	Score	P	Score
Sep 14 – 18, 2016	(United States) 2016 CS U.S. Classic	1	70.09	1	136.66	1	206.75
Oct 1, 2016	2016 Japan Open	—N/a	—N/a	2	143.39	1	—N/a
Oct 28 – 30, 2016	2016 Skate Canada International	5	65.24	3	126.84	3	192.08
Nov 25 – 27, 2016	(Japan) 2016 NHK Trophy	3	64.20	2	133.80	2	198.00
Dec 8 – 11, 2016	(France) 2016-17 Grand Prix Final	3	74.64	2	143.69	2	218.33
Dec 22 – 25, 2016	2016-17 Japan Championships	1	76.49	1	138.38	1	214.87

Results in the 2017–18 season
Date	Event	SP		FS		Total	
Date	Event	P	Score	P	Score	P	Score
Nov 10 – 12, 2017	(Japan) 2017 NHK Trophy	6	65.05	6	126.75	5	191.80
Nov 24 – 26, 2017	(United States) 2017 Skate America	1	70.72	1	143.31	1	214.03
Dec 7 – 10, 2017	(Spain) 2017-18 Grand Prix Final	3	74.61	4	138.88	5	213.49
Dec 21 – 24, 2017	2017-18 Japan Championships	2	73.23	1	147.16	1	220.39
Jan 22 – 28, 2018	(Taiwan) 2018 Four Continents Championships	1	71.74	3	135.28	3	207.02
Feb 9 – 12, 2018	(South Korea) 2018 Winter Olympics – Team event	4	68.95	—N/a	—N/a	5	—N/a
Feb 15 – 23, 2018	(South Korea) 2018 Winter Olympics	4	75.94	4	**146.44**	4	**222.38**
Mar 19 – 25, 2018	(Italy) 2018 World Championships	3	74.36	3	135.72	3	210.08

Results in the 2018–19 season
Date	Event	SP		FS		Total	
Date	Event	P	Score	P	Score	P	Score
Sep 12 – 16, 2018	(United States) 2018 CS U.S. Classic	1	67.53	1	133.70	1	201.23
Oct 19 – 21, 2018	(United States) 2018 Skate America	1	73.86	1	145.85	1	219.71
Nov 9 – 11, 2018	(Japan) 2018 NHK Trophy	2	**76.08**	2	143.39	2	219.47
Dec 6 – 9, 2018	(Canada) 2018-19 Grand Prix Final	6	67.52	6	133.79	6	201.31
Dec 20 – 24, 2018	2018-19 Japan Championships	1	76.76	4	146.58	3	228.34
Feb 5 – 10, 2019	(Germany) 2019 Bavarian Open	2	67.79	1	136.77	1	204.56
Mar 18 – 24, 2019	(Italy) 2019 World Championships	8	70.60	6	145.35	6	215.95

Results in the 2019–20 season
Date	Event	SP		FS		Total	
Date	Event	P	Score	P	Score	P	Score
Sep 17 – 22, 2019	(United States) 2019 CS U.S. Classic	1	74.16	2	130.14	1	204.30
Oct 3, 2015	2019 Japan Open	—N/a	—N/a	4	134.94	2	—N/a
Nov 8 – 10, 2019	2019 Cup of China	2	68.91	3	142.27	2	211.18
Nov 15 – 17, 2019	(Russia) 2019 Rostelecom Cup	6	63.09	4	129.33	4	192.42
Dec 18 – 22, 2019	2019-20 Japan Championships	2	70.11	6	121.32	4	191.43
Feb 5 – 10, 2019	(Germany) 2020 Bavarian Open	1	66.11	1	125.91	1	192.61

Results in the 2020–21 season
Date	Event	SP		FS		Total	
Date	Event	P	Score	P	Score	P	Score
Dec 24 – 27, 2021	2020-21 Japan Championships	6	66.48	3	143.27	3	209.75
Mar 22 – 28, 2021	(Sweden) 2021 World Championships	16	59.99	19	112.31	19	172.30

Results in the 2021–22 season
Date	Event	SP		FS		Total	
Date	Event	P	Score	P	Score	P	Score
Oct 3, 2021	2021 Japan Open	—N/a	—N/a	6	119.69	1	—N/a
Oct 22 – 24, 2021	(United States) 2021 Skate America	8	66.36	6	134.15	7	200.51
Nov 5 – 7, 2021	(Italy) 2021 Gran Premio d'Italia	4	70.85	5	138.72	5	209.57
Dec 22 – 26, 2021	2021-22 Japan Championships	4	73.76	6	132.75	5	206.51

Results in the 2023–24 season
Date	Event	SP		FS		Total	
Date	Event	P	Score	P	Score	P	Score
Oct 7, 2023	2023 Japan Open	—N/a	—N/a	4	123.22	1	—N/a

=== Junior level ===
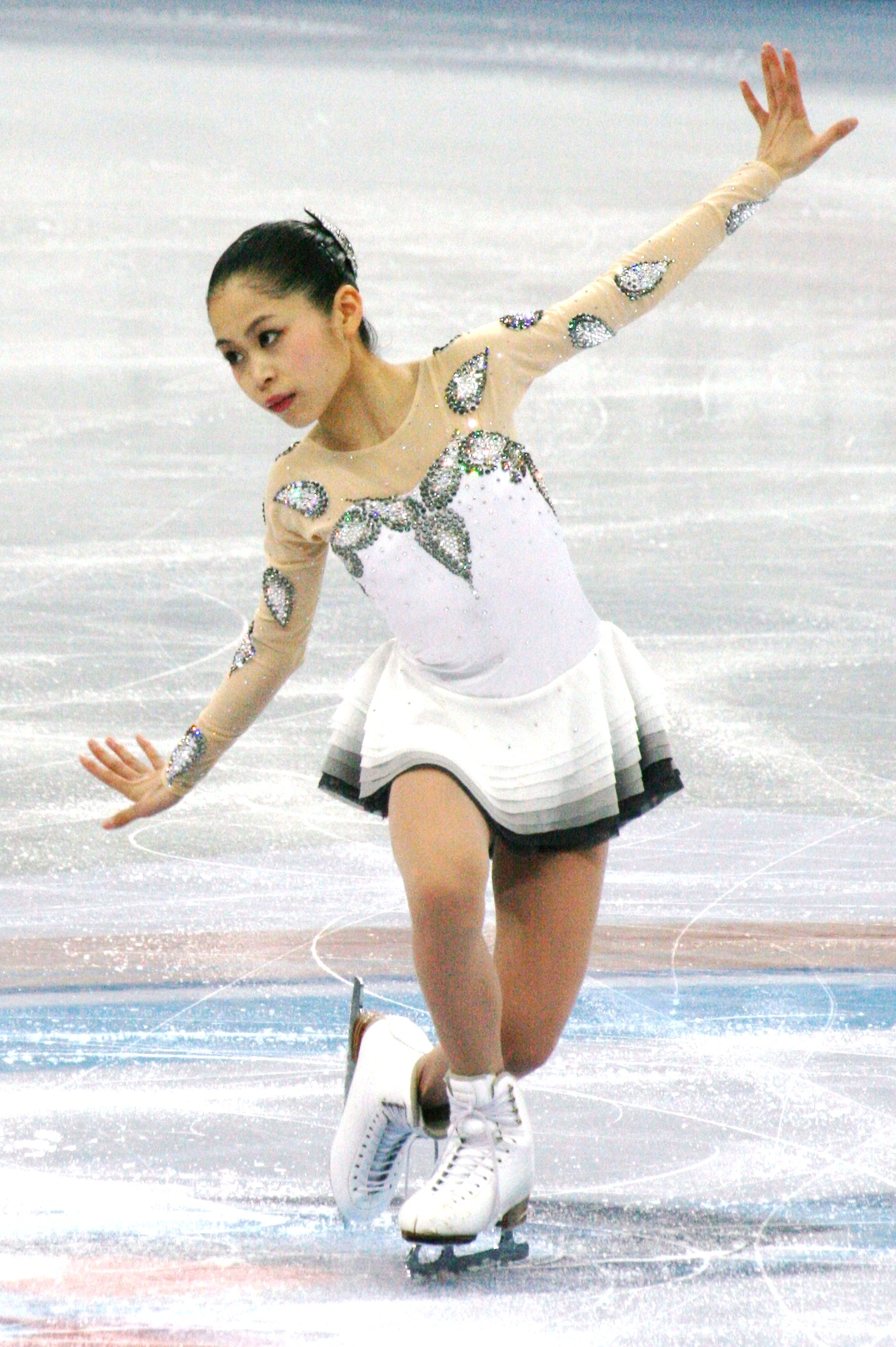
Miyahara at the 2012-13 Junior Grand Prix Final

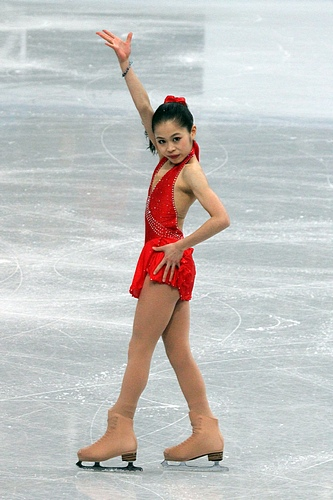
Miyahara at the 2012 World Junior Championships

Results in the 2009–10 season
Date	Event	SP		FS		Total	
Date	Event	P	Score	P	Score	P	Score
Nov 21 – 23, 2009	2009-10 Japan Championships (Junior)	4	48.32	6	82.67	4	130.99

Results in the 2010–11 season
Date	Event	SP		FS		Total	
Date	Event	P	Score	P	Score	P	Score
Nov 26 – 28, 2010	2010-11 Japan Championships (Junior)	10	43.74	4	96.49	4	140.23

Results in the 2011–12 season
Date	Event	SP		FS		Total	
Date	Event	P	Score	P	Score	P	Score
Sep 15 – 17, 2011	2011 JGP Poland	2	56.46	2	105.74	2	162.20
Oct 25 – 27, 2011	2011 JGP Italy	7	44.91	3	98.33	5	143.24
Nov 25 – 27, 2011	2011-12 Japan Championships (Junior)	1	56.76	1	115.41	1	172.17
Dec 22 – 25, 2011	2011-12 Japan Championships (Senior)	15	47.06	3	116.79	6	163.85
Mar 22 – 28, 2012	(Belarus) 2012 World Junior Championships	4	52.97	6	104.81	4	157.78

Results in the 2012–13 season
Date	Event	SP		FS		Total	
Date	Event	P	Score	P	Score	P	Score
Aug 8 – 12, 2012	(Taiwan) 2012 Asian Open Trophy	2	49.29	1	98.92	1	148.21
Aug 30 – Sep 1, 2012	2012 JGP United States	1	54.76	1	106.89	1	161.65
Sep 22 – 24, 2012	2012 JGP Turkey	6	46.62	2	96.74	3	143.36
Nov 17 – 18, 2012	2012-13 Japan Championships (Junior)	1	61.31	1	111.37	1	172.68
Dec 6 – 9, 2012	(Russia) 2012-13 Junior Grand Prix Final	5	49.60	5	108.14	5	157.74
Dec 20 – 24, 2012	2012-13 Japan Championships (Senior)	3	60.19	3	120.36	3	180.55
Feb 25 – Mar 3, 2013	(Italy) 2013 World Junior Championships	6	52.16	8	95.26	7	147.42

Results in the 2013–14 season
Date	Event	SP		FS		Total	
Date	Event	P	Score	P	Score	P	Score
Mar 10 – 16, 2014	(Bulgaria) 2014 World Junior Championships	4	63.57	4	114.12	4	177.69
