= 1999: The New Master =

EP by Prince and the Revolution
- Released: February 2, 1999
- Recorded: 1998
- Studio: Paisley Park
- Genre: Rock; pop; funk; soul
- Length: 34:12
- Label: NPG
- Producer: Prince

Prince chronology
The Truth (1998)	1999: The New Master (1999)	The Vault: Old Friends 4 Sale (1999)

Professional ratings
Review scores
Source	Rating
AllMusic	1.5/5 stars
Entertainment Weekly	B−

1999: The New Master is an EP of newly recorded versions of Prince's 1982 hit "1999". The EP was released in the year 1999 to take advantage of the song's namesake year. Using the original tracks, Prince added additional music, as well as contributions from a new lineup resembling the New Power Generation, including Rosie Gaines, Larry Graham and Doug E. Fresh. The EP was released in the US on CD, as well as a rare purple vinyl 12-inch.

Although Prince was still going by his unpronounceable, symbolic moniker at the time, he released the EP as "Prince and the Revolution", with the word Revolution written in reverse, as it had been on the original 1999 album cover. The Revolution members on the original track (Lisa Coleman and Dez Dickerson) did not participate in the re-recording, however. In fact, "The Inevitable Mix" of the track cut out the original members altogether and replaced them with Graham and Gaines. Three of the tracks had very little to do with "1999" at all: "Keep Steppin'" and "Rosie & Doug E. In a Deep House" were little more than opportunities for Fresh to rap and Gaines to scat, and the track titled "Rosario" features actress Rosario Dawson performing a political spoken word over the chords of "Little Red Corvette".

The original track has since been released on two hits compilations by Warner Bros.

== Track listing ==
No.	Title	Length
1.	"1999" (The New Master)	7:09
2.	"Rosario" (1999)	1:19
3.	"1999" (The Inevitable Mix)	5:46
4.	"1999" (Keep Steppin')	4:33
5.	"1999" (Rosie & Doug E. In a Deep House)	6:23
6.	"1999" (The New Master: Single Edit)	4:30
7.	"1999" (a cappella)	5:11

== Charts ==
Chart performance for 1999: The New Master
Chart (1999)	Peak position
US Billboard 200	150
US Top R&B/Hip-Hop Albums (Billboard)	58
