= The Holy River =

1997 single by Prince

- UK CD single

Single by Prince

from the album Emancipation
- B-side: "Somebody's Somebody" (remixes); "The Most Beautiful Girl in the World" (Mustang mix); "On Sale Now!"
- Released: January 13, 1997
- Recorded: 1995–1996
- Studio: Paisley Park (Chanhassen, Minnesota)
- Genre: Rock; pop; pop rock
- Length: 4:00 (radio edit); 6:55 (album version)
- Label: NPG; EMI
- Songwriter: Prince
- Producer: Prince

Prince singles chronology
"Betcha by Golly Wow!" (1996)	"The Holy River" (1997)	"Somebody's Somebody" (1997)

Music video
- "The Holy River" on YouTube

"The Holy River" is a song by American musician Prince (his stage name at that time being an unpronounceable symbol, see cover art), released in January 1997 by NPG/EMI as the second single from his nineteenth album, Emancipation (1996). The pop/rock-based song tells the story of spiritual enlightenment and of Prince's decision to marry Mayte Garcia. A music video was also produced to promote the single.

== Releases ==
The UK CD single was released as a two separate discs which fit in a double jewel case that was included with the first disc. Both discs had different picture sleeves and different contents, other than a "radio edit" of "The Holy River" and edit of "Somebody's Somebody" (also from Emancipation). Disc one also included two remixes of "Somebody's Somebody": a "Livestudio Mix" and an "Ultrafantasy Edit". Both were mostly re-recorded versions of the song with additional lyrics. Disc 2 included the previously released "The Most Beautiful Girl in the World (Mustang Mix)" and a one-minute commercial called "On Sale Now!". The UK cassette single was the same as disc 2, but without "On Sale Now".

A US promotional release was sent to pop radio stations at the same time as "Somebody's Somebody" was sent to Urban radio stations, it was also made available to consumers for free, and only through book chain, Borders. It was a cassette single with the previously unreleased "Welcome 2 the Dawn", advertised as being from the upcoming album The Dawn. In reality, the song was later released on The Truth.

Excluding the re-release of "1999", "The Holy River"/"Somebody's Somebody" became Prince's final UK Top 40 single in his lifetime.

== Composition ==
The mid-tempo number features a guitar melody without a chorus. It climaxes in a searing guitar and Pipe organ solo.

== Critical reception ==
David Stubbs from Melody Maker felt the song found TAFKAP "at his most limpid, most William Blake-like, in his sexual mysticism." Music Week gave the song three out of five, describing it as "a tasteful, restrained rock ballad stripped of funk pretension. Low-key, but still pleasant." David Sinclair from The Times wrote, "Gentle pop tune from the scandalously underrated Emancipation album."

== Charts ==
Weekly chart performance for "The Holy River"
Chart (1997)	Peak position
Belgium (Ultratip Bubbling Under Flanders)	4
Germany (GfK)	92
Netherlands (Dutch Top 40 Tipparade)	10
Netherlands (Single Top 100)	63
US Hot 100 Airplay (Billboard)	58
US Mainstream Top 40 (Billboard)	19
US Hot Adult Top 40 Tracks (Billboard)	31

Weekly chart performance for "The Holy River/Somebody's Somebody"
Chart (1997)	Peak position
Scotland Singles (OCC)	22
UK Singles (OCC)	19
