= The Vault: Old Friends 4 Sale =

Studio album by Prince
- Released: August 24, 1999
- Recorded: 1985–1996
- Genre: Jazz-funk; smooth jazz
- Length: 39:17
- Label: Warner Bros.
- Producer: Prince

Prince chronology
1999: The New Master (1999)	The Vault: Old Friends 4 Sale (1999)	Rave Un2 the Joy Fantastic (1999)

The Vault: Old Friends 4 Sale is the twenty-second studio album by American recording artist Prince. It was released on August 24, 1999, by Warner Bros. Records. The album was submitted to Warner Bros. Records in 1996, complete with artwork at the same time as Chaos and Disorder, but released three years later, shortly before Prince's Arista album release Rave Un2 the Joy Fantastic. The album was recorded from 1985 through 1996. It was the last album to be released by Warner Bros. to fulfill his 1992 contract obligations.

Fans often complain that the songs have been overworked and watered down from the original versions that can be heard on various bootlegs, particularly "Old Friends 4 Sale". Little promotion was done in the United States or United Kingdom to support the album. "Extraordinary" was occasionally performed during his 2002 One Nite Alone... Tour.

== Background and release ==
The Vault: Old Friends 4 Sale was Prince's first release with Warner Bros. Records since his eighteenth studio album, Chaos and Disorder (1996). His previous three albums, Emancipation (1996), Crystal Ball (1998), and The Truth (1998), were all released independently by NPG Records.

== Promotion ==
Unlike his previous studio albums, Prince did not embark on a concert series or tour and did very little to promote the album. The lack of a proper tour would continue until the release of his twenty-fifth studio album, One Nite Alone... (2002). Prince's next tour would not be until late 2000, when he began the Hit n Run Tour.

=== Singles ===
"Extraordinary" was released as the album's first promotional single on August 10, 1999, two weeks before the album's scheduled release.

Three further promotional singles were released from The Vault: Old Friends 4 Sale. The second, "The Rest of My Life", was released in Japan in 1999, and included "Extraordinary" as the CD's second track. "5 Women" was the third promo single, released exclusively in Germany. The fourth and final promotional single, "It's About That Walk", was also released in Germany.

== Critical reception ==
Professional ratings
Review scores
Source	Rating
AllMusic	3/5 stars
Entertainment Weekly	B+
The Guardian	3/5 stars
NME	4/10
Now	1/5 stars
PopMatters	6/10
Rolling Stone	2/5 stars

After its release, The Vault: Old Friends 4 Sale received generally mixed reviews from music critics. In a fairly positive review, Stephen Thomas Erlewine of AllMusic called it "an unassuming, jazzy little record that's damn near irresistible." Erlewine suggested that the tracks were comparable to the material found on Graffiti Bridge (1990). Entertainment Weekly's Marc Weingarten appreciated the album, stating that it "sounds more committed than a lot of his indie releases"; however, Weingarten noted that Prince fans would enjoy the album more.

In a mixed review, Mark Zeltner of PopMatters enjoyed songs "Extraordinary" and "It's About That Walk", but criticized the record's "lack of a cohesive musical theme", also calling the track listing "a series of songs that were forgotten or discarded long ago by their creator." A reviewer from Mojo was more mixed with the album, calling it "pleasing though predictable". Keith Phipps, writing for The A.V. Club, was disappointed by the album, blaming Warner Bros. for the "none-too-generous selection of material". Similarly, a critic from NME found the songs to be "mediocre", also noting that Warner Bros. takes "revenge on their erstwhile slave".

== Commercial performance ==
The Vault: Old Friends 4 Sale was moderately unsuccessful after its release, peaking at the lower positions of most record charts. In the United States, the album debuted and peaked at position eighty-five on the Billboard 200. In the United Kingdom, it peaked at number forty-seven, becoming his highest charting album since Emancipation (1996). The album was somewhat successful in the Netherlands, where it peaked at number sixteen. Elsewhere, the album was unsuccessful. In France and Germany, it peaked at positions sixty-four and forty-four, respectively.

== Track listing ==
All songs written and produced by Prince.

The Vault: Old Friends 4 Sale track listing
No.	Title	Length
1.	"The Rest of My Life"	1:40
2.	"It's About That Walk"	4:26
3.	"She Spoke 2 Me"	8:20
4.	"5 Women"	5:13
5.	"When the Lights Go Down"	7:11
6.	"My Little Pill"	1:09
7.	"There Is Lonely"	2:29
8.	"Old Friends 4 Sale"	3:27
9.	"Sarah"	2:53
10.	"Extraordinary"	2:28
Total length:		39:17

== Charts ==
Chart performance for The Vault: Old Friends 4 Sale
Chart (1999–2024)	Peak position
Austrian Albums (Ö3 Austria)	40
Belgian Albums (Ultratop Flanders)	31
Dutch Albums (Album Top 100)	15
French Albums (SNEP)	64
German Albums (Offizielle Top 100)	44
Hungarian Physical Albums (MAHASZ)	23
Scottish Albums (OCC)	95
Swiss Albums (Schweizer Hitparade)	21
UK Albums (OCC)	47
UK R&B Albums (OCC)	7
US Billboard 200	85
US Top R&B/Hip-Hop Albums (Billboard)	27
