= The Truth (Prince song) =

Single by Prince

from the album The Truth
- Released: February 14, 1997
- Recorded: December 1, 1996
- Studio: Paisley Park, Chanhassen, Minnesota, US
- Genre: Acoustic rock; folk; folk blues
- Length: 3:32
- Label: NPG
- Songwriter: Prince
- Producer: Prince

Prince singles chronology
"Somebody's Somebody" (1997)	"The Truth" (1997)	"1999" (1998)

"The Truth" is a song recorded by American recording artist Prince for his twenty-first and eponymous studio album, The Truth (1998). The track was released as the record's lead single by NPG Records on February 14, 1997. Being issued as a CD single, the recording was paired with previously unreleased track "Don't Play Me". "The Truth" was solely written and produced by Prince, who also provided the track's entire instrumentation. Musically, the recording is an acoustic rock and folk song that lyrically has Prince claiming that there is "no more truth" left in the world.

"The Truth" received generally positive reviews from music critics, who noticed Prince's change of artistry through the recording, which was perceived positively. The song was minimally promoted, including the singer performing "The Truth" live for the only time at a promotional concert venue in 2002.

== Release and composition ==
Crystal Ball (1998), a box set featuring Prince's twentieth and twenty-first studio albums, was originally announced in 1987, but delayed due to contract issues with Warner Bros. Records. After being released on March 3, 1998, Prince stated that the collection contained material "recorded over the period of a decade". Subsequently, "The Truth" was physically released on February 14, 1997, as a CD single via mail-order through Prince's fan club exclusively. The material on the CD consisted of the album version of the single, in addition to previously unreleased "Don't Play Me", which would later be included on the fourth disc of Crystal Ball. The release's liner notes hinted the then-upcoming box set, and encouraged fans to "call 1-800-NEW-FUNK" for future merchandise distributed solely by Prince's fan club.

"The Truth" was written and produced solely by Prince. The singer also provided all instrumentation for the recording, while musician HM Buff handled the track's engineering. Described as an acoustic rock and folk song, Prince provides vocals which are reminiscent of Tracy Chapman's works. Lyrically, the single portrays Prince responding to questions regarding "responsibility and honesty", in addition to him announcing that "there is no more 'truth'" left. Furthermore, he expresses themes of salvation, spirituality, and sexuality, and also reveals that anyone can be in "control over one's own creativity".

== Reception and promotion ==
"The Truth" was positively received by music critics. Alexis Petridis from The Guardian wrote, "An interesting single from Prince's artistically lean years, primarily because it took him somewhere new. Stark, acoustic and blues-influenced, performed solo and boasting a great vocal performance, The Truth didn't sound like any Prince single before it." Also Chris Nelson from MTV News positively noted the singer's evolution of artistry, which he also found evident on album tracks "Don't Play Me" and "Third Eye". Rolling Stone's James Hunter applauded the track for being unlike "his usual musical constructs", a tactic which he found "interesting". Hunter went on finding the recording reminiscent of the music on Prince's seventeenth studio album, The Gold Experience (1995). "The Truth" was performed live for the first and only time on June 24, 2002, alongside American singer and songwriter Norah Jones. The promotional concert was featured as part of promotion for Prince's twenty-sixth studio album, Xpectation (2003).

== Track listing ==
CD single
No.	Title	Length
1.	"The Truth"	3:32
2.	"Don't Play Me"	2:50

== Credits and personnel ==
Credits adapted from the liner notes of The Truth.

- Prince – vocals, lyrics, production, instruments
- Hans Martin Buff – sound engineer
- Parke – design

== Release history ==
Release history and formats for "The Truth"
Region	Date	Format	Label
United States	February 14, 1997	CD single	NPG Records
