= Somebody's Somebody =

1997 single by Prince

Single by Prince

from the album Emancipation
- Released: 13 January 1997
- Recorded: November 1994
- Studio: Paisley Park (Chanhassen, Minnesota)
- Genre: R&B; soul; quiet storm
- Length: 4:30 (radio edit); 4:43 (album version)
- Label: NPG; EMI
- Songwriters: Brenda Lee Eager; Prince; Hilliard Wilson
- Producer: Prince

Prince singles chronology
"The Holy River" (1997)	"Somebody's Somebody" (1997)	"The Truth" (1998)

"Somebody's Somebody" is a song from Prince's (his stage name at that time being an unpronounceable symbol, see cover art) 1996 album Emancipation.

The song is an R&B ballad about Prince being lonely and wanting someone to hold and wanting to be "somebody's somebody". The US promotional release was sent to urban radio stations at the same time that "The Holy River" was sent to pop radio stations, and the song achieved moderate success at urban radio peaking at number 15 on Billboard's Hot R&B/Hip-Hop Airplay chart. In other countries the song was released as a double A-side with "The Holy River". Excluding the re-release of "1999", "The Holy River" / "Somebody's Somebody" became Prince's final UK Top 40 single in his lifetime.

== Charts ==
Chart performance for "Somebody's Somebody"
Chart (1997)	Peak position
UK Singles (OCC) "The Holy River" / "Somebody's Somebody"	19
US Billboard Hot R&B/Hip-Hop Airplay	15
