= NYC (EP) =

EP by Prince
- Released: 1997
- Recorded: 11 January 1997
- Venue: Roseland Ballroom (New York City)
- Genre: Pop rock
- Length: 13:46
- Label: NPG

Prince chronology
Emancipation (1996)	NYC (1997)	Crystal Ball (1998)

NYC is an EP released by Prince (then known as "The Artist") in 1997. The EP was available only from Prince's NPG retail store known as "1-800-NEW-FUNK" and only in cassette format. It was also advertised as a "4th generation bootleg", and was recorded live at the Roseland Ballroom in New York City on January 11, 1997.

Track one was "Jam of the Year", the opening song from Prince's 1996 album Emancipation. It also became the name of the tour for the album. The second track is a live rendition of "Face Down", also from the same concert and edited to sound like it segued from "Jam of the Year".

== Track listing ==
Tracks repeat on both sides.

1. "Jam of the Year" – 5:21
2. "Face Down" – 8:33
