= It's About That Walk =

Promotional single by Prince

from the album The Vault: Old Friends 4 Sale
- Released: 1999
- Recorded: September 2, 1993
- Studio: Studio Guillaume Tell (Paris, France)
- Length: 4:26
- Label: Warner Bros.
- Songwriter(s): Prince
- Producer(s): Prince

"It's About That Walk" is a song recorded by American musician Prince. It was released as the third and final promotional single from his twenty-second studio album The Vault: Old Friends 4 Sale (1999). It was issued in 1999 as a promotional-only CD single, exclusively in Germany. Prince solely wrote and produced it, while a series of individuals provided various instrumentation for the track.

Originally recorded in September 1993, the song remained unreleased for six years until the announcement of The Vault: Old Friends 4 Sale. "It's About That Walk" received mixed reviews from music critics, who enjoyed the track's production, but found it to be "unmemorable". The German CD single was issued via Warner Bros. Records, including only the album version of the track; this marked Prince's final collaboration with Warner.

== Background and release ==
In July 1999, Prince announced the upcoming release of The Vault: Old Friends 4 Sale, a collection of previously unreleased material from his partnership with Warner Bros. Records. The material created was recorded from 1985 to 1994. While it is unknown what album Prince wrote the song for, "It's About That Walk" was written around the time The Hits/The B-Sides was released.

A CD single of "It's About That Walk" was released exclusively in Germany, to further promote The Vault: Old Friends 4 Sale. The CD solely included the album version of the track, but was not made available for purchase as it was a "promo-only" CD. This collaboration was the last Prince would do with Warner Bros. for nearly fifteen years; his next release with Warner would be Plectrumelectrum (2014).

== Critical response ==
After its release, "It's About That Walk" received mixed reviews from music critics. Mark Zeltner of PopMatters declared it the "best of the lot" on The Vault: Old Friends 4 Sale, favorably comparing it to the works of James Brown and Smokey Robinson. In a highly mixed review, a critic of NME called the single "agreeable" but "unmemorable".

== Credits and personnel ==
Credits adapted from The Vault: Old Friends 4 Sale liner notes

- Prince – vocals, lyrics, production, instruments
- Michael B. – drums
- Tommy Barbarella – keyboards
- Brian Gallagher – tenor saxophone
- Mr. Hayes – keyboards
- Kathy J. – baritone saxophone
- Dave Jensen – trumpet
- Michael Nelson – trombone
- Levi Seacer, Jr. – guitar
- Steve Strand – trumpet
- Sonny T. – bass guitar
