= Crystal Ball (box set) =

1998 box set by Prince

Box set by Prince
- Released: January 29, 1998
- Recorded: 1983–1996
- Genres: Pop; funk; rock
- Length: 149:10
- Label: NPG
- Producer: Prince

Prince chronology
NYC (1997)	Crystal Ball (1998)	The Truth (1998)

Professional ratings
Review scores
Source	Rating
AllMusic	3/5 stars
The A.V. Club	favorable
Entertainment Weekly	B+
Rolling Stone	3.5/5 stars
Yahoo! Music	favorable

Crystal Ball is a box set by American recording artist Prince. The set includes the eponymous Crystal Ball, Prince's twentieth studio album and second triple album, which consists of "previously bootlegged" material, as well as The Truth, Prince's 21st studio album.

The box set was initially only available through direct orders by phone and internet. The direct order edition included a fifth disc, an instrumental studio album by The NPG Orchestra titled Kamasutra. Shipment of this limited edition 5-CD version started on January 29, 1998, approximately two months before the release of the 4-CD version to retail stores on March 21, 1998.

The album Crystal Ball is Prince's second triple album in succession, following Emancipation. Each of the three CDs contain ten tracks and last fifty minutes, resembling Emancipation's 12-song, sixty-minute disc lengths.

In 2018, NPG Records released Crystal Ball and The Truth digitally on Spotify, iTunes, Tidal and Apple Music. In 2021, a special limited vinyl edition of The Truth was released on Record Store Day.

== Crystal Ball ==
Crystal Ball

Studio album by Prince
- Released: January 29, 1998
- Recorded: 1983; 1985–1986; 1991–1996
- Genres: Pop; funk; rock
- Length: 149:27
- Label: NPG
- Producer: Prince

Prince chronology
NYC (1997)	Crystal Ball (1998)	The Truth (1998)

The album is largely made up of tracks recorded in two periods: 1985–1986 and 1993–1996. The only exception is "Cloreen Bacon Skin", recorded in March 1983. No tracks were recorded specially for this album. However, "2morrow" was recorded after the completion of his previous album, Emancipation, making Crystal Ball the first album on which it could have been included. The album contains seven remixes or alternate versions of previously released tracks: "Love Sign (Shock G's Silky Remix)", "So Dark" (a remix of "Dark"), "Tell Me How U Wanna B Done" (a remix of "The Continental"), "Interactive", "Good Love", "Get Loose" (a remix of "Loose!") and "P. Control (Remix)".

This is the first Prince album of new material to feature previously released songs, although it primarily serves as an outtakes compilation rather than a studio album as such. Prince avoided using tracks that strongly featured the Revolution, as he intended to release a companion album, Roadhouse Garden, in 1999, containing previously unreleased Prince and the Revolution material (this album remains unreleased, however).

Copyright information on the album is given as 1997. No singles were released from the album, although "Love Sign" and "P. Control" had both previously been available as promo-only singles connected to their original albums, 1-800-NEW-FUNK and The Gold Experience, respectively. Although videos for "Acknowledge Me", "Interactive" and "18 & Over" were made a few years before this release (and not connected to any albums), they were not used as promotional tools for Crystal Ball. "Days of Wild" was released as a limited-release single in 2002, using a different live version than included here.

Prince did not tour or make any TV appearances to support the album. The album reached number 62 on the Billboard 200, and number 59 on the Billboard Top R&B/Hip-Hop Albums chart.

=== Track listing ===
All tracks are written by Prince, except where noted.

Disc one
No.	Title	Writer(s)	Year recorded	Length
1.	"Crystal Ball"		1986	10:28
2.	"Dream Factory"		1985	3:07
3.	"Acknowledge Me"		1993	5:27
4.	"Ripopgodazippa"	Prince, Sonny T., Michael Bland	1993	4:39
5.	"Love Sign" (Shock G's Silky remix)		1994	3:53
6.	"Hide the Bone"	Prince, Brenda Lee Eager, Hilliard Wilson	1993	5:04
7.	"2morrow"		1996	4:14
8.	"So Dark"		1994	5:14
9.	"Movie Star"		1986	4:26
10.	"Tell Me How U Wanna B Done"		1992	3:16
Total length:				49:48

Disc two
No.	Title	Year recorded	Length
1.	"Interactive"	1993	3:04
2.	"Da Bang"	1995	3:20
3.	"Calhoun Square"	1993	4:47
4.	"What's My Name"	1993	3:04
5.	"Crucial"	1986	5:06
6.	"An Honest Man"	1985	1:13
7.	"Sexual Suicide"	1985	3:40
8.	"Cloreen Bacon Skin"	1983	15:37
9.	"Good Love"	1986	4:55
10.	"Strays of the World"	1993	5:07
Total length:			49:53

Disc three
No.	Title	Year recorded	Length
1.	"Days of Wild" (live)	1995	9:19
2.	"Last Heart"	1986	3:01
3.	"Poom Poom"	1996	4:32
4.	"She Gave Her Angels"	1996	3:53
5.	"18 & Over"	1994	5:40
6.	"The Ride" (live)	1995	5:14
7.	"Get Loose"	1994	3:31
8.	"P Control" (remix)	1993	6:00
9.	"Make Your Mama Happy"	1986	4:01
10.	"Goodbye"	1994	4:35
Total length:			49:46

=== Personnel ===
Adapted from Benoît Clerc and Duane Tudahl

==== Musicians ====
- Prince – lead vocals (all tracks except 2;8), rap (tracks 1;3, 3;3, 3;5, 3;8), spoken vocals (tracks 2;7–8), backing vocals (all tracks except 1;5, 2;4, 2;8, 3;6), beat box (track 3;3), electric guitar (all tracks except 1;8, 2;4, 2;6–9, 3;3, 3;8, 3;10), acoustic guitar (tracks 2;5, 2;10), Roland G-707 (tracks 1;9, 2;7), bass (all tracks except 1;4–6, 1;8, 2;1, 2;3, 2;6, 3;6), synthesizers (all tracks except 1;6, 2;1–4, 2;8, 3;1, 3;3, 3;6), Ensoniq Mirage (track 3;9), Fairlight CMI (tracks 1;1, 2;9), Prophet VS (tracks 2;5, 2;9, 3;9), Yamaha DX7 (track 3;2), piano (tracks 2;5, 3;4, 3;10), Fender Rhodes piano (track 1;7), Hammond organ (track 2;10), programming (tracks 1;3, 1;7–10, 3;3–4, 3;7–8, 3;10), Linn LM-1 (tracks 2;5, 2;9), drums (tracks 1;1–2, 1;9, 2;2, 2;5, 2;7, 2;9–10, 3;2, 3;7–9), percussion (tracks 1;1, 1;7, 3;8), finger cymbals (tracks 1;1, 1;8–9), claps (tracks 2;1, 3;3), tambourine (tracks 2;2, 2;5, 3;5), bells (track 2;3), finger snapping (track 3;8)
- Susannah Melvoin – lead vocals (track 1;1), spoken vocals (tracks 1;1–2, 1;9), backing vocals (tracks 1;1–2, 2;7, 2;9, 3;2, 3;9), recorder (track 1;1)
- Wendy Melvoin – recorder (track 1;1)
- Michael B. – drums (tracks 1;4, 1;6, 1;8, 2;1, 2;3–4, 2;10, 3;1, 3;6), shaker (track 2;4)
- Brian Gallagher – tenor saxophone (tracks 1;4, 1;7–8)
- Mayte – spoken vocals (tracks 1;4, 3;8), backing vocals (track 1;6)
- Dave Jensen, Steve Strand – trumpet (tracks 1;4, 1;7–8)
- Kathy Jensen – clarinet (track 1;4), baritone saxophone (tracks 1;7–8)
- Michael B Nelson – trombone (tracks 1;4, 1;7–8)
- Sonny T. – bass (tracks 1;4, 1;6, 1;8, 2;1, 2;3–4, 2;10, 3;1, 3;6)
- Shock G – synthesizers (track 1;5)
- Nona Gaye – lead vocals (track 1;5)
- Paul Peterson – bass (track 1;5)
- Ricky Peterson – synthesizers (track 1;5)
- Statik – programming (track 1;5)
- Tommy Barbarella – synthesizers (tracks 1;6, 2;1, 2;3, 2;10, 3;1, 3;6)
- Mr Hayes – Hammond organ (tracks 1;6, 1;8, 2;1, 2;3–4, 2;10, 3;1, 3;6)
- Carmen Electra – spoken vocals (track 1;10)
- Kirk Johnson – programming (tracks 1;10, 3;5)
- Eric Leeds – saxophone (tracks 2;7, 3;2, 3;9)
- Morris Day – drums (track 2;8)
- Jill Jones – backing vocals (track 2;9)
- Rain Ivana – spoken vocals (track 3;1)
- Mike Scott – electric guitar (track 3;5)
- Orchestra (tracks 1;1, 3;10)

==== Technical ====
- Prince – producer (all tracks except 1;5), recording engineer (tracks 1;4, 2;1, 3;8)
- Shock G – producer (track 1;5), remix (track 1;5)
- Ricky Peterson – producer (track 1;5)
- Kirk Johnson – remix (track 1;10)
- Susan Rogers – recording engineer (tracks 1;1–2, 1;9, 2;5–7, 2;9, 3;2, 3;9)
- Peggy McCreary – recording engineer (tracks 1;2, 2;8)
- Steve Durkee – recording engineer (tracks 1;3, 1;6, 3;10), assistant recording engineer (track 1;10)
- Shane T Keller – recording engineer (tracks 1;3, 1;6, 3;10)
- David "Chronic Freeze" Friedlander – recording engineer (tracks 1;3, 1;5, 1;8, 1;10, 2;3–4, 2;10, 3;5, 3;7, 3;10)
- Ray Hahnfeldt – recording engineer (tracks 1;3, 1;5–6, 1;8, 1;10, 2;3–4, 2;10, 3;5, 3;7, 3;10)
- Tom Tucker – recording engineer (tracks 1;5–6, 1;8, 2;3–4, 2;10, 3;5, 3;7)
- Hans-Martin Buff – recording engineer (tracks 1;7, 3;4)
- Steve Noonan – recording engineer (tracks 1;10, 3;10)
- Brian Poer – recording engineer (track 1;10, 3;10), assistant recording engineer (track 1;5)
- Coke Johnson – recording engineer (tracks 2;6, 2;9, 3;2)
- David Ravkin – recording engineer (track 2;9)
- Michael Koppelman – recording engineer (track 3;10)
- Todd Herreman – assistant recording engineer (track 1;1)
- Kyle Bess – assistant recording engineer (track 1;5)
- Kimm James – assistant recording engineer (tracks 1;5, 1;8, 3;7)
- Xanex Bess, Tom Garneau – assistant recording engineer (tracks 1;8, 3;7)
- Dave Aron, Airiq Anest – assistant recording engineer (track 1;10)
- Clare Fischer – strings arrangement (tracks 1;1, 3;10)

=== Charts ===
Chart performance for Crystal Ball
Chart (1998)	Peak position
US Billboard 200	62

== The Truth ==
The Truth

Studio album by Prince
- Released: January 29, 1998
- Recorded: December 1996 – March 1997; December 1997
- Studio: Paisley Park
- Genre: Acoustic
- Length: 43:18
- Label: NPG
- Producer: Prince

Prince chronology
Crystal Ball (1998)	The Truth (1998)	The Vault: Old Friends 4 Sale (1999)

Singles from The Truth
- 1. "The Truth" Released: February 14, 1997

The Truth is the twenty-first studio album by Prince. It was released as the fourth CD in the Crystal Ball box set. The arrangements are mainly based around the acoustic guitar, augmented with elaborate production effects, multi-layered vocals, and occasional percussion and percussive effects. A CD single was released prior to the album, consisting of the record's first two tracks. In 2018, NPG Records released The Truth digitally on Spotify, iTunes, Tidal and Apple Music. In 2021, a special limited vinyl edition of The Truth was released on Record Store Day.

=== Track listing ===
All tracks are written by Prince, except where noted.

No.	Title	Writer(s)	Length
1.	"The Truth"		3:34
2.	"Don't Play Me"		2:48
3.	"Circle of Amour"		4:43
4.	"3rd "		4:53
5.	"Dionne"		3:13
6.	"Man in a Uniform"	Prince, Rhonda Smith	3:07
7.	"Animal Kingdom"	Prince, Smith	4:01
8.	"The Other Side of the Pillow"		3:21
9.	"Fascination"		4:55
10.	"One of Your Tears"		3:27
11.	"Comeback"		1:59
12.	"Welcome 2 the Dawn (Acoustic Version)"		3:17
Total length:			43:18

=== Personnel ===
Adapted from Benoît Clerc

==== Musicians ====
- Prince – lead vocals (all tracks), whistles (track 8), backing vocals (tracks 2–12), beat box (track 4), electric guitar (tracks 3, 9), acoustic guitar (all tracks), bass (tracks 3, 6–7), synthesizers (all tracks), Hammond organ (track 4), piano (track 5), drums (track 4), finger snapping (tracks 1, 11), percussion (tracks 6–7)
- Rhonda Smith – bass (tracks 7, 9–10)
- Kat Dyson – backing vocals (track 9), percussion (track 9)
- David "Fingers" Haynes – drums (track 9)
- Kirk Johnson – backing vocals (track 9), percussion (track 9), programming (track 10)
- Mike Scott – electric guitar (track 9)

==== Technical ====
- Prince – producer (all tracks)
- Hans-Martin Buff – recording engineer (all tracks)

=== Charts ===
Chart performance for The Truth
Chart (2021)	Peak position
Danish Albums (Hitlisten)	24
Dutch Albums (Album Top 100)	31
Portuguese Albums (AFP)	26
Scottish Albums (Official Charts)	73
UK R&B Albums (Official Charts)	2
US Billboard 200	64

== Kamasutra ==
Kamasutra

Studio album by The NPG Orchestra
- Released: February 14, 1997 (cassette); January 29, 1998 (box set)
- Recorded: 1994–1995
- Studios: Paisley Park; The Record Plant; Mad Hatter Studios
- Genres: Classical; jazz
- Length: 40:57
- Label: NPG
- Producer: Prince

Kamasutra is an instrumental studio album by The NPG Orchestra. It was first released on cassette on February 14, 1997, and later in the limited edition Crystal Ball box set as the fifth CD on January 29, 1998, by NPG Records. The album was written to be played during Prince's wedding to Mayte Garcia in 1996. The tracks range in style from classical music, jazz and experimentations with various sounds. For example, the track "Cutz" uses the sound of scissors snipping as its basis. Another track, "The Plan", was previewed in an excerpt on the 1996 3-CD set Emancipation.

=== Track listing ===
All tracks are written by Prince.

No.	Title	Length
1.	"The Plan"	2:03
2.	"Kamasutra"	11:49
3.	"At Last... "The Lost is Found""	3:37
4.	"The Ever Changing Light"	2:59
5.	"Cutz"	3:03
6.	"Serotonin"	0:47
7.	"Promise/Broken"	3:46
8.	"Barcelona"	2:16
9.	"Kamasutra/Overture #8"	3:11
10.	"Coincidence or Fate?"	3:24
11.	"Kamasutra/Eternal Embrace"	4:02
Total length:		40:57

=== Personnel ===
Adapted from Benoît Clerc

==== Musicians ====
- Prince – synthesizers, Synclavier, piano, sound effects
- Murray Adler, Israel Baker, Bette Byers, Russel Cantor, Isabelle Daskoff, Yvette Deveraux, Assa Drori, Pamela Gates, Edward P Greene Jr, Norma Leonard, Robert Lezin, Yoko Matsuda, Calabria McChesney, Donald Palmer, James V Ross, Gladys Secunda, Harry Scorzo, Harry Shirinian, Benjamin Simon, Ross Shub, Robert Sushel, Marshall Daniel Thomason, Anita A. Thompson, Pam Tomkins Mari Tsumura, Gerald Vinci, Francine Walsh – violin
- Marilyn Baker, Suzanna Giordano, Peter Hatch, Margot MacLaine, Jorge Moraga, Carole Mukogawa, Nancy Roth, Herschel Wise – viola
- Leslie Benedict, Alexander Iles, Andrew M Martin, Michael B Nelson, Morris Repass – trombone
- Charles Boito, Jon Christopher Clarke, Don Shelton – clarinet
- Dennis Budimir, John J Mitchell, John F Reilly – guitar
- Larry Bunker – percussion, vibraphone
- Robert D Carr, Lisa Edelstein, David Randall Stone, James R Walker – flute
- Charles A Coker, Jenice Rosen – bassoon
- Douglas Davis, Marie Fera, Judith Johnson, Anne Karam, Raymond Kelley, Frederick Seykora, Cécilia Tsan – cello
- David Duke, Marilyn Johnson, Joseph Meyer, Yvonne Suzette Moriaty – horn
- Árni Egilsson, James David Hughart, Morton Klanfer – double bass
- Brent Fischer, Richard Hamilton, Richard Mitchell – unknown
- Brian Gallagher – tenor saxophone
- C Terry Harrington, Daniel L Higgins, Eric Leeds, Jack Nimitz – saxophone
- Dave Jensen, Steve Strand – trumpet
- Kathy Jensen – baritone saxophone
- Gayle Levant – harp
- John Ranieri – piano, saxophone, flute
- Robert Tricarico – oboe

==== Technical ====
- Prince – producer
- Steve Durkee, Arne Frager, Ray Hahnfeldt, Shane T Keller, Larry Mah – recording engineer
- Clare Fischer – orchestral arrangement, conductor
