= Emancipation (Prince album) =

Studio album by Prince
- Released: November 19, 1996
- Recorded: November 1994 – October 1996
- Genres: Funk; pop; R&B
- Length: 185:57
- Languages: English; Spanish
- Labels: NPG; EMI
- Producer: Prince

Prince chronology
Chaos and Disorder (1996)	Emancipation (1996)	NYC (1997)

Singles from Emancipation
- 1. "Slave" Released: December 9, 1995 (US promo); 2. "Betcha by Golly Wow!" Released: November 13, 1996; 3. "The Holy River" / "Somebody's Somebody" Released: January 13, 1997

Emancipation is the nineteenth studio album by American recording artist Prince. It was released on November 19, 1996, by NPG Records and EMI Records as a triple album. The title refers to Prince's freedom from his contract with Warner Bros. Records after 18 years, with which he had a contentious relationship. The album was Prince's third to be released that year (along with Chaos and Disorder and the soundtrack album of the Spike Lee movie Girl 6), which made 1996 one of the most prolific years for material released by Prince.

== Overview ==
Emancipation marked the first album in Prince's career to include cover versions of songs written by other songwriters. He said that he had wanted to cover songs in the past, but was advised against it by Warner Bros. Four such covers appeared on the album: "Betcha by Golly Wow!" (previously a hit for the Stylistics), " Can't Make You Love Me" (previously a hit for Bonnie Raitt), "La-La (Means I Love You)" (previously a hit for the Delfonics) retitled "La, La, La Means Love U", and "One of Us" (written by Eric Bazilian, and previously a hit for Joan Osborne). Notably, Prince changed the chorus of "One of Us" from "What if God was one of us / Just a slob like one of us" to "... Just a slave like one of us".

The album is notable for its format: it consists of three discs, each containing 12 songs with exactly 60 minutes per disc. Prince insinuated to the press at the time that the number of songs, discs and length of the album had a connection with the Egyptians and Egyptian pyramids.

== Reception ==
Professional ratings
Review scores
Source	Rating
AllMusic	3.5/5 stars
Blender	4/5 stars
Entertainment Weekly	B
The Guardian	4/5 stars
Los Angeles Times	4/4 stars
Music Week	4/5 stars
NME	5/10
Q	4/5 stars
The Rolling Stone Album Guide	4/5 stars
Spin	7/10
The Village Voice	A−

In the United States, the album debuted at number 11. Though not a major seller, it did sell over 500,000 copies. Being three discs, it qualified to being certified double platinum (the RIAA certifies based on the number of discs sold - 3 disc set).

The subsequent Jam of the Year World Tour was a major success (though very few songs from Emancipation were included in the concerts and the vast majority of the album's tracks remained unperformed), resulting in a significant comeback for Prince after the commercial and critical disappointment of Chaos and Disorder from four months earlier.

The song "The Love We Make" was used as the finale of 2020 TV series We Are Who We Are.

== Track listing ==
All tracks are written by Prince, except where noted.

Disc 1
No.	Title	Writer(s)	Length
1.	"Jam of the Year"		6:09
2.	"Right Back Here in My Arms"		4:43
3.	"Somebody's Somebody"	Prince; Brenda Lee Eager; Hilliard Wilson	4:43
4.	"Get Yo Groove On"		6:31
5.	"Courtin' Time"		2:46
6.	"Betcha by Golly Wow!"	Thom Bell; Linda Creed	3:31
7.	"We Gets Up"		4:18
8.	"White Mansion"		4:47
9.	"Damned If Do"		5:21
10.	" Can't Make U Love Me"	Mike Reid; Allen Shamblin	6:37
11.	"Mr. Happy"		4:46
12.	"In This Bed Scream"		5:40
Total length:			59:52

Disc 2
No.	Title	Writer(s)	Length
1.	"Sex in the Summer"		5:57
2.	"One Kiss at a Time"		4:41
3.	"Soul Sanctuary"	Prince; Sandra St. Victor; Thomas Hammer; Jonathan Kemp	4:41
4.	"Emale"		3:38
5.	"Curious Child"		2:57
6.	"Dreamin' About U"		3:52
7.	"Joint 2 Joint"		7:52
8.	"The Holy River"		6:55
9.	"Let's Have a Baby"		4:07
10.	"Saviour"		5:48
11.	"The Plan"		1:47
12.	"Friend, Lover, Sister, Mother/Wife"		7:37
Total length:			59:52

Disc 3
No.	Title	Writer(s)	Length
1.	"Slave"		4:51
2.	"New World"		3:43
3.	"The Human Body"		5:42
4.	"Face Down"		3:17
5.	"La, La, La Means Love U"	Bell; William Hart	3:59
6.	"Style"		6:40
7.	"Sleep Around"		7:42
8.	"Da, Da, Da"		5:15
9.	"My Computer"		4:37
10.	"One of Us"	Eric Bazilian	5:19
11.	"The Love We Make"		4:39
12.	"Emancipation"		4:12
Total length:			59:56

Notes:

- "Mr. Happy" contains a sample of "What Can I Do?" (1994) by Ice Cube.
- "Sex in the Summer" contains a sample of "Good Old Music" (1970) by Funkadelic.
- "Face Down" contains a strings sample of "Killin' at the Soda Shop" by Jill Jones, orchestrated by Clare Fischer.
- "Style" contains a sample of "Atomic Dog" (1982) by George Clinton.
- "Sleep Around" contains a sample of "Squib Cakes" (1974) by Tower of Power.
- "The Love We Make" was inspired by Jonathan Melvoin's death.

== Personnel ==
Adapted from Benoît Clerc

=== Musicians ===
- Prince – lead vocals (all tracks except 2;11 and 3;4), rap (tracks 1;2, 1;11, 3;4), spoken vocals (track 2;6), backing vocals (all tracks 2;9, 2;11, and 3;4), beat box (tracks 1;2, 3;1), electric guitar (tracks 1;1, 1;3–5, 1;7, 1;9, 1;12, 2;1, 2;4, 2;7–8, 2;10, 2;12, 3;2, 3;4, 3;6–10, 3;12), acoustic guitar (tracks 1;8–9, 2;5, 2;8, 2;12, 3;9), bass (all tracks except 1;6–7, 1;10, 2;1, 2;6, 2;10–11, 3;2–3, and 3;10), synthesizers (all tracks except 1;6, 2;9, and 3;10), piano (tracks 1;1–2, 1;5, 1;9, 2;5, 2;8–9, 3;5, 3;11), Hammond organ (track 3;7), drums (tracks 1;7, 1;9, 3;11), programming (tracks 1;4, 1;9–12), Roland TR-808 (track 3;8), finger cymbals (track 1;1), percussion (tracks 1;2–3, 1;9, 1;12, 2;3, 3;6), claps (tracks 1;5, 1;7, 2;10), tambourine (tracks 1;8, 2;1, 2;3, 2;8, 3;5)
- Walter Chancellor Jr. – saxophone (tracks 1;1, 3;6)
- Rosie Gaines – backing vocals (track 1;1)
- Eric Leeds – flute (track 1;1), saxophone (tracks 1;1, 1;4, 1;7, 1;10, 2;1, 2;4, 2;6, 3;6)
- Michael Mac – backing vocals (track 3;6), scratching (tracks 1;2, 1;11, 2;7)
- Ninety-9 – vocal sample (tracks 1;2, 3;4)
- Kat Dyson – backing vocals (track 1;4), electric guitar (track 2;1), Godin classical guitar (track 2;6)
- Mr. Hayes – backing vocals (track 1;4), synthesizers (track 1;6), Hammond organ (tracks 2;10, 3;10)
- Rhonda Smith – spoken vocals (track 1;4), bass (tracks 1;4, 1;7, 1;10, 2;1, 2;6)
- Brian Gallagher – tenor saxophone (tracks 1;5, 1;9, 2;10, 3;7)
- Dave Jensen, Steve Strand – trumpet (tracks 1;5, 1;9, 2;10, 3;7)
- Kathy Jensen – baritone saxophone (tracks 1;5, 1;9, 2;10, 3;7)
- Michael B Nelson – trombone (tracks 1;5, 1;9, 2;10, 3;7)
- Tommy Barbarella – synthesizers (tracks 1;6, 2;10, 3;10)
- Michael B. – drums (tracks 1;6, 2;10, 3;10)
- Sonny T. – bass (tracks 1;6, 2;10, 3;10)
- Brian Lynch – trumpet (tracks 1;7, 2;4, 3;6)
- Janice Garcia – spoken vocals (track 1;8)
- Mayte – Spanish spoken vocals (track 1;9), backing vocals (track 3;10)
- Todd Burrell – synthesizers (track 1;10)
- Scrap D. – rap (tracks 1;11, 3;8), backing vocals (track 3;6)
- Ricky Peterson – synthesizers (track 2;10), piano (track 2;1)
- Hans-Martin Buff – spoken vocals (track 2;7), sound effects (track 2;7)
- Savion Glover – tap dance (track 2;7)
- Kirk Johnson – drums (not confirmed) (track 2;8)
- Joe Galdo, César Sogbe – synthesizers (track 3;3), programming (tracks 3;3, 3;7)
- Chanté Moore – backing vocals (track 3;5)
- Mike Scott – electric guitar (track 3;5)
- Smooth G – backing vocals (track 3;6)
- Kate Bush – backing vocals (track 3;9)

=== Technical ===
- Prince – producer (all tracks), arrangements (all tracks)
- Steve Durkee, Shane T Keller – recording engineers (all tracks except 3;5 and 3;7)
- Ray Hahnfedt, Tom Tucker – recording engineers (all tracks except 3;7)
- Hans-Martin Buff, Peter Mokran – recording engineers (tracks 1;2, 1;4, 1;6–8, 1;10–12, 2;1–2, 2;4–8, 3;3, 3;6–7, 3;9, 3;11)
- Joe Galdo, César Sogbe – recording engineers (tracks 3;3, 3;7)
- Kirk Johnson – arrangements (all tracks)

== Singles and Hot 100 positions ==
- "Betcha by Golly Wow!" (No. 31 US Airplay, No. 10 US R&B Airplay, No. 11 UK, No. 20 Australia)
  1. "Betcha by Golly Wow!"
  2. "Right Back Here in My Arms"
- "The Holy River" (UK CD 1) (No. 58 US Airplay, No. 19 UK)
  1. "The Holy River" (radio edit)
  2. "Somebody's Somebody" (edit)
  3. "Somebody's Somebody" (live studio mix)
  4. "Somebody's Somebody" (Ultrafantasy edit)
- "Somebody's Somebody" (promo CD) (No. 15 US R&B Airplay, No. 19 UK)
  1. "Somebody's Somebody" (radio edit)
  2. "Somebody's Somebody" (album version)

== Charts ==
=== Weekly charts ===
Weekly chart performance for Emancipation
Chart (1996)	Peak position
Australian Albums (ARIA)	8
Austrian Albums (Ö3 Austria)	13
Belgian Albums (Ultratop Flanders)	8
Belgian Albums (Ultratop Wallonia)	22
Danish Albums (Hitlisten)	15
Dutch Albums (Album Top 100)	13
French Albums (SNEP)	9
German Albums (Offizielle Top 100)	21
New Zealand Albums (RMNZ)	22
Norwegian Albums (VG-lista)	27
Spanish Albums (AFYVE)	42
Swedish Albums (Sverigetopplistan)	22
Swiss Albums (Schweizer Hitparade)	1
UK Albums (Official Charts)	18
US Billboard 200	11
US Top R&B/Hip-Hop Albums (Billboard)	6

=== Year-end charts ===
Year-end chart performance for Emancipation
Chart (1997)	Position
US Billboard 200	146
US Top R&B/Hip-Hop Albums (Billboard)	68

== Certifications ==
Certifications for Emancipation
Region	Certification	Certified units/sales
Canada (Music Canada)	Platinum	100,000^{^}
Japan (RIAJ)	Gold	100,000^{^}
United States (RIAA)	2× Platinum	666,666^{^}
^{^} Shipments figures based on certification alone.
